= El Gran Show =

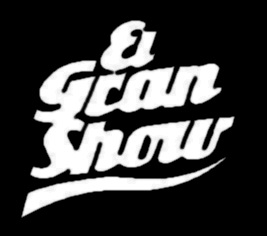
- Genre: Reality competition
- Based on: Bailando por un Sueño; Strictly Come Dancing
- Presented by: Gisela Valcárcel; Aldo Díaz; Cristian Rivero; Óscar López Arias; Paco Bazán; Jaime "Choca" Mandros; Miguel Arce
- Judges: Morella Petrozzi; Pachi Valle Riestra; Carlos Cacho; Michelle Alexander; Tilsa Lozano; Alfredo Di Natale; Max Suffrau; Phillip Butters; Rosanna Lignarolo; Alexis Grullón; Stuart Bishop; Carlos Alcántara
- Country of origin: Peru
- Original language: Spanish
- No. of seasons: 21
- No. of episodes: 215

Production
- Executive producer: Percy Bozzetta Soldevilla
- Production locations: Santa Beatriz, Lima, Peru; Pachacámac, Lima, Peru
- Running time: 150 minutes
- Production company: GV Producciones S.A.C

Original release
- Network: América Televisión
- Release: 15 May 2010 – 9 December 2017

El Gran Show ("The Amazing Show") is a dance reality show which aired from 2010 to 2017 on América Televisión in Peru. The show was the Peruvian version of the Mexican television series Bailando por un sueño, and was also based on the British reality television competition Strictly Come Dancing, the originator of the Dancing with the Stars franchise. The show was hosted by Gisela Valcárcel, alongside Miguel Arce, who became co-host in season sixteen. Cristian Rivero was co-host in seasons one through five, Óscar López Arias co-hosted seasons seven through eight, Paco Bazán in seasons nine through fourteen and Jaime "Choca" Mandros in seasons fifteen, and Miguel Arce beginning with season sixteen.

Every season, celebrities and amateur dancers (Dreamers) are paired up. Celebrities have included actors, models, singers, athletes, television hosts, and comedians. The format is similar to Bailando por un sueño and El Show De Los Sueños: 11 participants called "Dreamers" star in a dance competition in which the winner will realize a dream that becomes public knowledge, either to resolve a personal problem or to help someone else. The program focuses on social assistance that can be provided to talented people who have no economic means to achieve certain goals. The tool that these dreamers have to overcome adversity is their talent for dancing. Eleven couples (dreamer and hero) compete over 10 weekly galas, in which the couple who received the fewest telephone votes from viewers is eliminated. At the final gala, two couples compete to determine who will win the fulfilment of their dream.

== Cast ==
=== Hosts ===
Gisela Valcárcel has been the host since the program's premiere in 2010. In season one through five, her co-host was Cristian Rivero. The season six, no did have co-host. Óscar López Arias was co-host for seasons seven through eight (2012), who was then replaced by Paco Bazán from seasons nine through fourteen (2013–15). In the 2016 season, Jaime "Choca" Mandros (who had participated in the season nine) was co-host in season fifteen and Miguel Arce in season sixteen.

Color key:

Host	Co-host	Contestant

Cast member	Seasons																				
Cast member	2010			2011			2012		2013			2015			2016			2017			
Cast member	1	2	K	1	2	K	1	S	1	2	K	1	2	K	1	2	K	1	2	3	K
Gisela Valcárcel																					
Aldo Díaz																					
Cristian Rivero																					
Óscar López Arias																					
Paco Bazán																					
Gachi Rivero																					
Jaime "Choca" Mandros																					
Miguel Arce																					

=== Judging panel ===
The regular judges are Morella Petrozzi and Pachi Valle Riestra, both are judges in all seasons, and Carlos Cacho who entered the eight season to present. They were also members of the judging panel, but shorter periods: Carlos Alcántara (winner of the first season of Bailando por un Sueño), Stuart Bishop, Alexis Grullón (who later would participate in the show), Rosanna Lignarolo, Phillip Butters, Max Suffrau, Alfredo Di Natale and Michelle Alexander. Other celebrities, most often those who are associated with the world of dancing, music, acting or TV, and past contestants have appeared as a judge or in absence of one of the main judges, including Marco Zunino, Vania Masías, Johanna San Miguel, Abel Talamantez, Federico Salazar, Fiorella Rodríguez and Bettina Oneto. In the 2016 the format change, each week was a guest judge, who give couples 1 or 2 points more, even they could refuse to just granting it.

Color key:

Judge	Contestant

Cast member	Seasons																				
Cast member	2010			2011			2012		2013			2015			2016			2017			
Cast member	1	2	K	1	2	K	1	S	1	2	K	1	2	K	1	2	K	1	2	3	K
Morella Petrozzi																					
Pachi Valle Riestra																					
Carlos Alcántara																					
Stuart Bishop																					
Alexis Grullón																					
Carlos Cacho																					
Rosanna Lignarolo																					
Phillip Butters																					
Max Suffrau																					
Alfredo Di Natale																					
Michelle Alexander																					
Tilsa Lozano																					

== Series overview ==
Season	Contestants	Episodes	Originally released		Winners	Runners-up	Third place
Season	Contestants	Episodes	First released	Last released	Winners	Runners-up	Third place
1	11	13	May 15, 2010	August 7, 2010	Gisela Ponce de León & Rayder Vásquez	Jesús Neyra & Cindy Tello	Maricarmen Marín & Diego Alza
2	12	12	August 14, 2010	October 30, 2010	Belén Estévez & Gian Frank Navarro	Karen Dejo & Edward Mávila	Miguel Rebosio & Fabianne Hayashida
3	8	7	November 6, 2010	December 18, 2010	Miguel Rebosio & Fabianne Hayashida	Belén Estévez & Gian Frank Navarro	Gisela Ponce de León & Rayder Vásquez
4	8	11	May 14, 2011	July 23, 2011	Raúl Zuazo & Dayana Calla	Leslie Shaw & Kevin Ubillus	Vanessa Terkes & Andy Sandoval
5	12	14	July 30, 2011	October 29, 2011	Jesús Neyra & Lucero Clavijo	Belén Estévez & Waldir Felipa	Maricielo Effio & Elí Vela
6	7	7	November 5, 2011	December 17, 2011	Belén Estévez & Waldir Felipa	Maricielo Effio & Elí Vela	Jesús Neyra & Lucero Clavijo
7	13	13	August 25, 2012	November 17, 2012	Jhoany Vegas & Pedro Ibáñez	Denisse Dibós & Eduardo Pastrana	Macs Cayo & Diana Follegati
8	8	6	November 24, 2012	December 29, 2012	Karen Dejo & Oreykel Hidalgo	Micheille Soifer & Christian Navarro	Alexis Grullón & Stephanie Palacios
9	12	13	May 18, 2013	August 10, 2013	Emilia Drago & Sergio Lois	Víctor Hugo Dávila & Lindathay Valero	Claudia Portocarrero & Joel Velázquez
10	12	12	August 17, 2013	November 2, 2013	Gino Pesaressi & Jacqueline Alfaro	Sheyla Rojas & Emanuel Colombo	Carolina Cano & Eduardo Pastrana
11	6	7	November 9, 2013	December 21, 2013	Carolina Cano & Eduardo Pastrana	Gino Pesaressi & Jacqueline Alfaro	Emilia Drago & Sergio Lois
12	12	12	May 16, 2015	August 1, 2015	Melissa Loza & Sergio Álvarez	Franco Cabrera & Pierina Neira	Brenda Carvalho & Irving Figueroa
13	12	13	August 8, 2015	October 31, 2015	Ismael La Rosa & Michelle Vallejos	Erick Elera & Andrea Huapaya	Milena Zárate & Anselmo Pedraza
14	8	7	November 7, 2015	December 19, 2015	Yahaira Plasencia & George Neyra	Brenda Carvalho & Pedro Ibáñez	María Grazia Gamarra & Sergio Álvarez
15	12	12	April 30, 2016	July 23, 2016	Milett Figueroa & Patricio Quiñones	Fiorella Cayo & Jimy García	Christian Domínguez & Isabel Acevedo
16	10	13	July 30, 2016	October 22, 2016	Rosángela Espinoza & Lucas Piro	Leslie Shaw & Oreykel Hidalgo	Melissa Paredes & Sergio Álvarez
17	8	8	October 29, 2016	December 17, 2016	Rosángela Espinoza & Lucas Piro	Thiago Cunha & Thati Lira	Fiorella Cayo & Jimy García
18	10	10	April 1, 2017	June 3, 2017	Diana Sánchez & Maylor Pérez	Christian Domínguez & Isabel Acevedo	Andrea Luna & Marlon Pérez
19	10	12	June 10, 2017	August 26, 2017	Brenda Carvalho & Kevin Ubillus	Lucas Piro & Maru Piro	Belén Estévez & Waldir Felipa
20	9	7	September 2, 2017	October 14, 2017	Anahí de Cárdenas & George Neyra	Vania Bludau & Oreykel Hidalgo	César Távara & Alexa Montoya
21	8	8	October 21, 2017	December 9, 2017	Brenda Carvalho & Pedro Ibáñez	Diana Sánchez & Sergio Álvarez	Karen Dejo & Oreykel Hidalgo
22	7	6	July 6, 2019	August 10, 2019	Vania Bludau & Diego Cornejo	Korina Rivadeneira & Sergio Álvarez	Natalie Vértiz & André Lecca
23	10	10	June 26, 2021	August 28, 2021	Korina Rivadeneira & Sergio Álvarez	Milena Zárate & Oreykel Hidalgo	Leslie Moscoso & Anthony Aranda
24	10	10	September 4, 2021	November 6, 2021	Isabel Acevedo & Jimy García	Gabriela Herrera & Jorge Valcárcel	Brenda Carvalho & Sergio Álvarez
25	12	TBA	October 1, 2022	TBA	TBA	TBA	TBA

== Scoring and voting procedure ==
The first season of the Peruvian reality show “El Gran Show” was dedicated only to dance. Eleven couples, consisting of a celebrity (called a "hero") and an amateur dancer (called a "dreamer") would dance each week, and all couples would dance the same style of dance. At the end of the show, Gisela revealed who was the winning couple of the week and the bottom two couples with the lowest scores who would go into judgment.

- Scoring and the secret score: Each judge gives a 1 to 10 score, for a total score of 4 to 40. One of the scores are not shown in the same airing, it will be revealed in the end of the show with intent that couples can not add or predict final scores and keep tensions and expectations until the time of "The Case"
- The Case: The bottom two couples are automatically in risk of being eliminated. The audience members have the entire week (Saturday to Saturday) to vote for their favourite couple. The sentenced couples must induce people to vote for them. On Saturday the bottom two couples are sent to duel.
- The Duel: The bottom two couples must dance a different dance style than all the non-sentenced couples with professional dancers. While the show is airing, the represented cities of the couples are connected live to the show, to illustrate the support of the family and sometimes of the mayor. At the end of the show, before the Judgment, Gisela reveals the percentages of the two couples. The couple with lowest percentage is eliminated and their score is void.
- Faith Balls: The use of "Faith Balls" was introduced in the sixth gala of the first season, but was also used in the second season of "El Show de Los Sueños". Before Gisela revealed the percentages of the bottom two couples, a big glass cup with eight secret balls inside was brought onstage. Six balls have the El Gran Show's logo and two have an "X". Both couples choose one ball. If the chosen ball has the El Gran Show's logo, Gisela cancels the percentage and the two couples are automatically safe. But if they choose the "X", Gisela must read the results and one couple is eliminated.

== See also ==
- Bailando por un Sueño, which contains a full list of international versions.
- Strictly Come Dancing, the original British version of the program.
- Dancing with the Stars, which contains a full list of international versions.
