= El Gran Show season 17 =

El Gran Show: Reyes del show
- Season 17
- Hosted by: Gisela Valcárcel; Aldo Díaz
- Judges: Morella Petrozzi; Pachi Valle Riestra; Carlos Cacho; Michelle Alexander
- Celebrity winner: Rosángela Espinoza
- Professional winner: Lucas Piro
- No. of episodes: 8

Release
- Original network: América Televisión
- Original release: October 29 – December 17, 2016

Season chronology
- ← Previous; Season 16 Next → Season 18

Reyes del Show (English: Show Kings) is the season three of the 2016 edition of El Gran Show premiered on October 29, 2016.

On December 17, 2016, model & reality TV star Rosángela Espinoza and Lucas Piro were crowned champions, axé star Thiago Cunha and Thati Lira finished second, while actress & singer Fiorella Cayo and Jimy García finished third. This was Espinoza's second victory, making her the second participant in the show's history to win two seasons, after Belén Estévez. At the same time, Piro became the first professional dancer to win two seasons.

== Cast ==
=== Couples ===
The participating couples of this season were conformed by the first three positions of the first and second season. Even so, it was announced that two new couples will enter the competition, these were presented during the first week, being Thiago Cunha and Thati Lira and the Reyes del Show of 2015 winners, Yahaira Plasencia and George Neyra.

Celebrity	Notability (known for)	Professional partner (Note: During Week 4, the celebrities performed with a different professional partner as part of the "Partner Switch-Up" for that week only. All celebrities returned to their original partners on Week 5.)	Status	Ref.
Leslie Shaw	Singer, model & actress	Oreykel Hidalgo	Eliminated 1st on November 12, 2016	
Melissa Paredes	Model & reality TV star	Sergio Álvarez	Eliminated 2nd on November 19, 2016	
Milett Figueroa	Model & reality TV star	Patricio Quiñones	Withdrew on November 26, 2016	
Yahaira Plasencia	Salsa singer	George Neyra; Jimmy Garcia (week 4)	Eliminated 3rd on December 10, 2016	
Christian Domínguez	Singer & actor	Isabel Acevedo; Thati Lira (week 4)	Eliminated 4th on December 10, 2016	
Fiorella Cayo	Actress & singer	Jimy Garcia; Lucas Piro (week 4)	Third place on December 17, 2016	
Thiago Cunha	Axé star	Thati Lira; Isabel Acevedo (week 4)	Runner-up on December 17, 2016	
Rosángela Espinoza	Model & reality TV star	Lucas Piro; George Neyra (week 4) (Note: Espinoza also danced with Freddy Reyes (week 1).)	Winners on December 17, 2016	

==== Previous seasons ====
Season	Celebrity	Partner	Average	Place
1	Milett Figueroa	Patricio Quiñones	32.6	1.º
1	Fiorella Cayo	Jimy Garcia	33.5	2.º
1	Christian Domínguez	Isabel Acevedo	31.5	3.º
2	Rosángela Espinoza	Lucas Piro	35.3	1.º
2	Leslie Shaw	Oreykel Hidalgo	34.2	2.º
2	Melissa Paredes	Sergio Álvarez	33.9	3.º

=== Host and judges ===
Gisela Valcárcel and Aldo Díaz returned as hosts while Miguel Arce not returned. Morella Petrozzi, Carlos Cacho, Michelle Alexander, Pachi Valle Riestra and the VIP Jury returned as judges. Due to an accident suffered by his mother, Cacho could not be present during the second, fifth and eighth week.

== Scoring charts ==
Couple	Place	1	2	3	4	5	6	7	8 (Note: In this week, the dances scores were not shown, announcing only the position in which each couple finished.)
Rosángela & Lucas	1	32	30	38	29	30	79	84	Winners
Thiago & Thati	2	30	28	36	38	28	72	77	Runner-up
Fiorella & Jimy	3	34	31	38	35	28	69	71	Third place
Christian & Isabel	4	33	28	40	36	30	50	73	
Yahaira & George	5	38	27	44	35	31	40	74	
Milett & Patricio	6	34	26	35	39	—			
Melissa & Sergio	7	35	26	32	37				
Leslie & Oreykel	8	34	22	37					

Red numbers indicate the sentenced for each week
Green numbers indicate the best steps for each week
the couple was eliminated that week
the couple was safe in the duel
the couple was eliminated that week and safe with a lifeguard
this couple withdrew from the competition
the winning couple
the runner-up couple
the third-place couple

=== Average score chart ===
This table only features qualified dances on a 40-point scale.

Rank by average	Place	Couple	Total points	Number of dances	Average
1	1	Rosángela & Lucas	324	9	36.0
2	3	Fiorella & Jimy	311	9	34.6
3	2	Thiago & Thati	310	9	34.4
4	6	Milett & Pato	136	4	34.0
5	8	Leslie & Oreykel	100	3	33.3
6	7	Melissa & Sergio	132	4	33.0
7	5	Yahaira & George	294	9	32.7
8	4	Christian & Isabel	293	9	32.6

=== Highest and lowest scoring performances ===
The best and worst performance in each dance according to the judges' 40-point scale are as follows:

Dance	Highest scored dancer(s)	Highest score	Lowest scored dancer(s)	Lowest score
Salsa	Yahaira Plasencia	37	Thiago Cunha	29
Cumbia	Rosángela Espinoza	40	Yahaira Plasencia	20
Jazz	Fiorella Cayo	37	Leslie Shaw	31
Doble dance	Yahaira Plasencia	40	Melissa Paredes	31
Tango	Leslie Shaw	36	—	—
Jive	Rosángela Espinoza	38	Rosángela Espinoza	28
Pachanga	Milett Figueroa	36	Melissa Paredes	34
Festejo	Yahaira Plasencia	40	—	—
Saya	Rosángela Espinoza	39	—	—
Merengue	Thiago Cunha	33	—	—
Axé	Thiago Cunha	34	—	—
Contemporary	Thiago Cunha	40	Fiorella Cayo	34
Dance improvisation	Rosángela Espinoza	37	Christian Domínguez	16

=== Couples' highest and lowest scoring dances ===
Scores are based upon a potential 40-point maximum.

Couple	Highest scoring dance(s)	Lowest scoring dance(s)
Rosángela & Lucas	Cumbia (40)	Jive (28)
Thiago & Thati	Contemporary (40)	Salsa (29)
Fiorella & Jimy	Jazz & Cumbia/Reggaeton (37)	Country (31)
Christian & Isabel	Latin pop/Guaracha (39)	Cha-cha-cha (16)
Yahaira & George	Latin pop/Quebradita & Festejo (40)	Cumbia (20)
Milett & Pato	Pachanga (36)	Salsa & Jazz (33)
Melissa & Sergio	Salsa & Pachanga (34)	Festejo/Merengue (31)
Leslie & Oreykel	Tango (36)	Jazz (31)

== Weekly scores ==
Individual judges' scores in the charts below (given in parentheses) are listed in this order from left to right: Morella Petrozzi, Carlos Cacho, Michelle Alexander, Pachi Valle Riestra, VIP Jury.

=== Week 1: Acrobatic Salsa Night ===
The couples danced acrobatic salsa. This week none couples were sentenced.

Due to an injury, Lucas Piro was unable to perform, so Rosángela Espinoza danced with troupe member Freddy Reyes instead.

Running order

Couple	Scores	Dance	Music	Result
Christian & Isabel	33 (8, 8, 9, 8, 0)	Salsa	"Pelotero a la Bola"—Hansel & Raúl	Safe
Rosángela & Freddy	32 (8, 7, 8, 8, +1)	Salsa	"Arrancando en Fa"—Sonora Carruseles	Safe
Fiorella & Jimy	34 (8, 8, 9, 8, +1)	Salsa	"La Rumba Buena"—Orquesta La 33	Safe
Thiago & Thati	30 (7, 7, 8, 7, +1)	Salsa	"Magdalena, Mi Amor (Quimbara)"—DLG feat. Ivy Queen	Safe
Melissa & Sergio	35 (8, 9, 9, 8, +1)	Salsa	"El Águila"—Manolito y su Trabuco	Safe
Milett & Patricio	34 (8, 8, 9, 8, +1)	Salsa	"Lo Que Tengo Yo"—Los 4 feat. La Charanga Habanera	Safe
Yahaira & George	38 (9, 9, 10, 9, +1)	Salsa	"I Love Salsa"—N'Klabe	Best steps
Leslie & Oreykel	34 (8, 8, 9, 8, +1)	Salsa	"Aña Pa' Mi Tambor"—La Excelencia	Safe

=== Week 2: Tributes Night ===
The couples performed a dance to pay tribute to different artists. In the versus, only three couples faced dancing acrobatic bachata, the winner would take two extra points plus the couples who gave their support votes.

Running order

Couple	Scores	Dance	Music	Result
Rosángela & Lucas	28 (10, 8, 9, +1)	Cumbia	"Cariñito" / "Me Gusta" / "La Culebrítica"—Tribute to peruvian cumbia	Safe
Leslie & Oreykel	23 (8, 8, 7, 0)	Jazz	"The Way You Make Me Feel" / "Black or White" / "Beat It"—Tribute to Michael Jackson	Sentenced
Thiago & Thati	28 (9, 10, 8, +1)	Jazz	"You Should Be Dancing" / "You Can't Stop the Beat" / "You're the One; That I Want"—Tribute to John Travolta	Safe
Fiorella & Jimy	29 (10, 10, 8, +1)	Jazz	"Detrás de Mi Ventana" / "Hombres al Borde de un Ataque de Celos" / "El Apagón"—Tribute to Yuri	Best steps
Milett & Patricio	26 (8, 10, 7, +1)	Jazz	"Vogue" / "Like a Virgin" / "Hung Up"—Tribute to Madonna	Sentenced
Yahaira & George	27 (9, 9, 8, +1)	Salsa	"Yo Viviré" / "Bemba Colorá" / "Que Le Den Candela"—Tribute to Celia; Cruz	Safe
Christian & Isabel	28 (9, 10, 8, +1)	Jazz	"El Noa-Noa" / "Abrázame Muy Fuerte" / "Bésame"—Tribute to Juan; Gabriel	Safe
Melissa & Sergio	26 (8, 10, 7, +1)	Cumbia	"Como la Flor" / "El Chico del Apartamento 512" / "Techno Cumbia"— Tribute to Selena	Saved

The versus
Couple (Supports)	Judges' votes	Dance	Music	Result
Rosángela & Lucas (Fiorella)	Rosángela, Rosángela, Rosángela, Rosángela	Bachata	"Eres Mía"—Romeo Santos	Winners (2 pts)
Milett & Patricio (No one)	Rosángela, Rosángela, Rosángela, Rosángela	Bachata	"Mi Corazoncito"—Aventura	Losers
Yahaira & George (Leslie, Melissa, Christian, Thiago)	Rosángela, Rosángela, Rosángela, Rosángela	Bachata	"Te Extraño"—Xtreme	Losers

=== Week 3: Doble Dance Night ===
The couples (except those sentenced) performed a double dance. In the little train, only the women faced dancing reggaeton.

Running order

Couple	Scores	Dance	Music	Result
Fiorella & Jimy	38 (10, 10, 8, 9, +1)	Cumbia; Reggaeton	"Queremos Bailar"—La Cumbia "El Ritmo No Perdona (Prende)"—Daddy Yankee	Safe
Rosángela & Lucas	38 (9, 10, 10, 8, +1)	Pachanga; Samba	"Bailan Rochas y Chetas"—Nene Malo "Samba do Brasil"—Bellini	Safe
Melissa & Sergio	32 (8, 8, 8, 7, +1)	Festejo; Merengue	"Chacombo"—Arturo "Zambo" Cavero "Que Buena Esta La Fiesta"—Los Hermanos Rosario	Sentenced
Leslie & Oreykel	37 (8, 9, 10, 9, +1)	Tango*	"La Cumparsita"—Gerardo Matos Rodríguez	—
Milett & Patricio	35 (8, 9, 9, 8, +1)	Salsa*	"La Pantera Mambo"—Orquesta La 33	Sentenced
Thiago & Thati	36 (8, 10, 9, 8, +1)	Latin pop Cumbia	"Oye El Boom"—David Bisbal "Siqui Siqui"—Euforia	Safe
Yahaira & George	42 (11, 10, 10, 10, +1)	Latin pop Quebradita	"Lo Hecho Está Hecho"—Shakira "Saluca Uca Uca"—Banda Pelillos	Best steps
Christian & Isabel	40 (9, 10, 10, 10, +1)	Latin pop Guaracha	"Dame Más"—Ricky Martin "Tu Boquita"—Alquimia la Sonora del XXI	Safe

The little train
Participants	Judges' votes	Dance	Music	Winner(s)
Woman	Yahaira, Yahaira, Yahaira, Yahaira, Yahaira	Reggaeton	"Shaky Shaky"—Daddy Yankee	Yahaira Plasencia (2 pts)

The duel*

- Leslie & Oreykel: Eliminated
- Milett & Patricio: Safe

=== Week 4: Switch-Up Night ===
The couples (except those sentenced) danced jive with a different partner selected by the production. In the versus, only three couples faced dancing Bollywood, the winner would take two extra points plus the couples who gave their support votes.celebrities, decided to support them.

Running order

Couple	Scores	Dance	Music	Result
Fiorella & Lucas	35 (9, 9, 8, 8, +1)	Jive	"Proud Mary"—Tina Turner	Saved
Yahaira & Jimy	33 (8, 8, 8, 8, +1)	Jive	"Bang Bang"—Jessie J, Ariana Grande & Nicki Minaj	Sentenced
Milett & Patricio	37 (9, 9, 10, 8, +1)	Pachanga*	"Pégate"—Ricky Martin	Best steps
Melissa & Sergio	35 (9, 8, 8, 9, +1)	Pachanga*	"Quiéreme"—Johnny Sky / "Cachondea"—Fruko y sus Tesos	—
Christian & Thati	34 (8, 8, 8, 9, +1)	Jive	"Jailhouse Rock"—Elvis Presley	Safe
Thiago & Isabel	38 (8, 10, 10, 9, +1)	Jive	"Tainted Love"—Soft Cell	Safe
Rosángela & George	29 (7, 7, 7, 7, +1)	Jive	"Candyman"—Christina Aguilera	Sentenced

The versus
Couple (Supports)	Judges' votes	Dance	Music	Result
Christian & Isabel (Milett, Yahaira, Melissa)	Christian, Thiago, Christian, Christian	Bollywood	"Şımarık"—Tarkan	Winners (2 pts)
Thiago & Thati (Fiorella, Rosángela)	Christian, Thiago, Christian, Christian	Bollywood	"Jai Ho! (You Are My Destiny)"—A. R. Rahman & The Pussycat Dolls	Losers

The duel*

- Milett & Patricio: Safe
- Melissa & Sergio: Eliminated

=== Week 5: Trio Dances Night ===
The couples (except the sentenced ones) performed a trio dance involving another celebrity. In the versus, Rosángela & Lucas faced to the former contestants Belén Estévez & Waldir Felipa dancing an acrobatic double dance; the winner would take two extra points plus the couples who gave their support votes.

At the beginning of the program, the retirement of Milett Figueroa and Patricio Quiñones was announced, who would not continue competing for Figueroa's labor issues.

Running order

Couple (Trio Dance Partner)	Scores	Dance	Music	Result
Christian & Isabel (Diana Sánchez)	28 (9, 9, 9, +1)	Salsa	"Mala Mujer"—Saperoko	Safe
Fiorella & Jimy (Braulio Chappell)	28 (9, 9, 9, +1)	Salsa	"Juana Magadalena"—La Charanga Habanera	Sentenced
Yahaira & George	31 (10, 10, 10, +1)	Festejo*	"Le Dije a Papá" / "Mueve el Totó" / "Shaky Shaky"—Perú Negro	Best steps
Rosángela & Lucas	30 (10, 10, 9, +1)	Saya*	"Negrita"—Los Kjarkas / "Veneno Para Olvidar"—Grupo Huella	Safe
Thiago & Thati (Marisela Puicón)	26 (8, 9, 8, +1)	Merengue	"A Pedir Su Mano"—Juan Luis Guerra	Sentenced

The versus
Couple (Supports)	Judges' votes	Dance	Music	Result
Belén & Waldir (Thiago, Christian)	Belén, Rosángela, Belén, Belén	Bachata; Salsa	"Qué Bonito"—Vicky Corbacho "La Malanga"—Eddie Palmieri	Winners (2 pts)
Rosángela & Lucas (Fiorella, Yahaira)	Belén, Rosángela, Belén, Belén	Bachata; Salsa	"Qué Bonito"—Vicky Corbacho "La Malanga"—Eddie Palmieri	Losers

The duel*

- Rosángela & Lucas: Safe
- Yahaira & George: Eliminated (but safe with the lifeguard)

=== Week 6: Quarterfinals ===
The couples danced cumbia (except those sentenced) and a dance improvisation which involved seven different dance styles, all being rehearsed during the week by the couples and only one being chosen by a draw in the live show.

Due to an injury that occurred minutes before the live show, Yahaira Plasencia could not dance, canceling the versus where she would face former contestant Maricielo Effio. In addition, Christian & Isabel decided not to dance during the second round. By regulation, both couples received the minimum score of the judges.

Running order

Couple	Scores	Dance	Music	Result
Yahaira & George	20 (5, 5, 5, 5, 0)	Cumbia	"Una Cerveza" / "Vete"—Ráfaga	Sentenced
Yahaira & George	20 (5, 5, 5, 5, 0)	—		Sentenced
Christian & Isabel	34 (8, 8, 9, 7, +2)	Cumbia	"Rágafa de Amor" / "Maldito Corazón"—Ráfaga	Sentenced
Christian & Isabel	16 (5, 5, 1, 5, 0)	—		Sentenced
Rosángela & Lucas	40 (10, 9, 10, 9, +2)	Cumbia	"Mentirosa" / "No Te Vayas"—Ráfaga	Best steps
Rosángela & Lucas	39 (10, 8, 10, 9, +2)	Reggaeton	"Quema, Quema"—Aldo y Dandy	Best steps
Thiago & Thati	36 (9, 8, 9, 8, +2)	Axé*	"Various Songs"—Orquesta Do Brasil	Safe
Thiago & Thati	36 (8, 9, 9, 8, +2)	Guaracha	"El Negrito del Batey"—Alberto Beltrán feat. La Sonora Matancera	Safe
Fiorella & Jimy	36 (9, 8, 9, 8, +2)	Contemporary*	"Elastic Heart"—Sia / "Controlla"—Drake	Safe
Fiorella & Jimy	33 (8, 7, 8, 8, +2)	Country	"Cotton Eye Joe"—Rednex	Safe

The duel*

- Thiago & Thati: Safe
- Fiorella & Jimy: Eliminated (but safe with the lifeguard)

=== Week 7: Semifinals ===
The couples performed a favorite dance and cumbia.

Due to the Yahaira Plasencia's injury, former contestant Karen Dejo replaced her, losing and being eliminated in the duel. However, Christian & Isabel, who had been saved, were eliminated by production due to contractual infractions.

Running order

Couple	Scores	Dance	Music	Result
Fiorella & Jimy	36 (10, 8, 8, 9, +1)	Jazz	"Provócame" / "Boom Boom"—Chayanne	Safe
Fiorella & Jimy	35 (9, 8, 8, 9, +1)	Cumbia	"Amor de Mis Amores"—Grupo 5	Safe
Thiago & Thati	44 (11, 10, 11, 10, +2)	Contemporary	"Try"—Pink	Safe
Thiago & Thati	33 (8, 8, 8, 8, +1)	Cumbia	"La Revancha"—Grupo 5	Safe
Christian & Isabel	33 (7, 8, 9, 7, +2)	Salsa*	"Qué Cosa Tan Linda"—Oscar D'León	Eliminated
Christian & Isabel	40 (9, 9, 10, 9, +3)	Cumbia	"La Culebrítica"—Grupo 5	Eliminated
Karen & George	37 (9, 9, 9, 8, +2)	Cumbia*	"Loquita"—Marama / "La Cerveza"—Ráfaga	—
Karen & George	37 (9, 9, 9, 8, +2)	Cumbia	"Quédate con Él"—Grupo 5	—
Rosángela & Lucas	41 (10, 9, 10, 9, +3)	Jive	"Great Balls of Fire"—Jerry Lee Lewis	Best steps
Rosángela & Lucas	43 (10, 10, 11, 10, +2)	Cumbia	"Apostemos Que Me Caso"—Grupo 5	Best steps

The duel*

- Christian & Isabel: Safe
- Karen & George: Eliminated

=== Week 8: Finals ===
The couples danced freestyle, trio salsa involving another celebrity and viennese waltz.

Running order

Couple (Trio Dance Partner)	Dance	Music	Result
Fiorella & Jimy (Emilia Drago)	Freestyle	"The Blower's Daughter"—Damien Rice / "Bitch Better Have My Money"—Rihanna	Third place
Fiorella & Jimy (Emilia Drago)	Salsa	"Que Se Sepa"—Roberto Roena	Third place
Fiorella & Jimy (Emilia Drago)	Viennese waltz	"Hijo de la Luna"—Mecano	Third place
Thiago & Thati (Yahaira Plasencia)	Freestyle	"España cañí"—Pascual Marquina Narro / "El Tango de Roxanne"—from Moulin Rouge!	Runner-up
Thiago & Thati (Yahaira Plasencia)	Salsa	"I Love Salsa"—N'Klabe	Runner-up
Thiago & Thati (Yahaira Plasencia)	Viennese waltz	"Have You Ever Really Loved a Woman?"—Bryan Adams	Runner-up
Rosángela & Lucas (Maricielo Effio)	Freestyle	"Spybreak!"—Propellerheads / "Clubbed to Death"—Rob Dougan	Winners
Rosángela & Lucas (Maricielo Effio)	Salsa	"Cachondea"—Fruko y sus Tesos	Winners
Rosángela & Lucas (Maricielo Effio)	Viennese waltz	"I Have Nothing"—Whitney Houston	Winners

== Dance chart ==
The celebrities and professional partners will dance one of these routines for each corresponding week:

- Week 1: Salsa (Acrobatic Salsa Night)
- Week 2: One unlearned dance & the versus (Tributes Night)
- Week 3: Double dance & the little train (Doble Dance Night)
- Week 4: Jive & the versus (Switch-Up Night)
- Week 5: Trio dances & the versus (Trio Dances Night)
- Week 6: Cumbia & dance improvisation (Quarterfinals)
- Week 7: Favorite dance & cumbia (Semifinals)
- Week 8: Freestyle, trio salsa & viennese waltz (Finals)

Couple	Week 1	Week 2	Week 3	Week 4	Week 5	Week 6		Week 7		Week 8		
Rosángela & Lucas	Salsa	Cumbia	Pachanga; Samba	Jive (Rosángela & George)	Saya	Cumbia	Reggaeton	Jive	Cumbia	Freestyle	Salsa	Viennese waltz
Thiago & Thati	Salsa	Jazz	Latin pop Cumbia	Jive (Thiago & Isabel)	Merengue	Axé	Guaracha	Contemporary	Cumbia	Freestyle	Salsa	Viennese waltz
Fiorella & Jimy	Salsa	Jazz	Cumbia; Reggaeton	Jive (Fiorella & Lucas)	Salsa	Contemporary	Country	Jazz	Cumbia	Freestyle	Salsa	Viennese waltz
Christian & Isabel	Salsa	Jazz	Latin pop Guaracha	Jive (Christian & Thati)	Salsa	Cumbia	—	Salsa	Cumbia			
Yahaira & George	Salsa	Salsa	Latin pop Quebradita	Jive (Yahaira & Jimy)	Festejo	Cumbia	—	Cumbia	Cumbia			
Milett & Patricio	Salsa	Jazz	Salsa	Pachanga								
Melissa & Sergio	Salsa	Cumbia	Festejo; Merengue	Pachanga								
Leslie & Oreykel	Salsa	Jazz	Tango									

Modalities of competition
Couple	Week 2	Week 3	Week 4	Week 5
Rosángela & Lucas	Bachata	Reggaeton	Bollywood	Bachata; Salsa
Thiago & Thati	Bachata	Reggaeton	Bollywood	Bachata; Salsa
Fiorella & Jimy	Bachata	Reggaeton	Bollywood	Bachata; Salsa
Christian & Isabel	Bachata	Reggaeton	Bollywood	Bachata; Salsa
Yahaira & George	Bachata	Reggaetón	Bollywood	Bachata; Salsa
Milett & Patricio	Bachata	Reggaeton	Bollywood	
Melissa & Sergio	Bachata	Reggaeton	Bollywood	
Leslie & Oreykel	Bachata	Reggaeton		

Highest scoring dance
Lowest scoring dance
Gained bonus points for winning
Gained no bonus points for losing
Danced, but not scored
In Italic indicate the dance performed in the duel

== Guest judges ==
Since the beginning of this season, a guest judge was present at each week to comment on and rate the dance routines. In the last week were present ten guest judges, who together with the main judges determined the winning couple.

Date	VIP Jury	Occupation(s)	Ref.
October 29, 2016	Andrea Llosa	Journalist & TV host	
November 5, 2016	Rebeca Escribens	Actress & TV host	
November 12, 2016	Sandra Arana	Actress & TV host	
November 19, 2016	Gian Piero Díaz	Actor & TV host	
November 19, 2016	Renzo Schuller	Actor & TV host	
November 26, 2016	Micheille Soifer	Singer	
December 3, 2016	Rebeca Escribens	Actress & TV host	
December 3, 2016	Fiorella Rodríguez	Actress & TV host	
December 10, 2016	Belén Estévez	Dancer & ex-vedette	
December 17, 2016	Mateo Chiarella Viale	Theater director	
December 17, 2016	Belén Estévez	Dancer & former vedette	
December 17, 2016	Jimmy Gamonet	Professional dancer & art director	
December 17, 2016	Roberto Murias	Professional dancer, choreographer & art director	
December 17, 2016	Vania Masías	Professional dancer & choreographer	
December 17, 2016	July Naters	Theater director	
December 17, 2016	Gina Natteri	Professional dancer & dance director	
December 17, 2016	Ernesto Pimentel	TV host	
December 17, 2016	Miguel Valladares	Producer	
December 17, 2016	Ducelia Woll	Professional dancer & choreographer	
