= Bailando por un Sueño =

Latin American franchised TV series

Bailando por un Sueño is a franchised TV series in various Latin American countries. Meaning "Dancing for a Dream", it is a reality series that commenced on the Mexican television network Canal de las Estrellas, in which celebrities are partnered with common, everyday people with dreams they want to fulfill, who each week compete against each other in a competition to impress a panel of judges. In each show, the two couples who receive the lowest score go head to head against each other to survive potential elimination. Through a telephone poll, viewers vote who should stay and who should go, the results of the poll being combined with the ranking of the panel of judges. The process continues until only two couples standing. Rather than the promise of a large cash prize, the winner gets a previously stated wish granted. The show is also broadcast in the United States on Univision. This includes a lot of famous actors and actresses from Latin America.

Many Latin American countries developed their own versions in a similar format after the success of the launch. Countries broadcasting similar format shows include Mexico, Argentina, Bolivia, Chile, Colombia, Brazil, Costa Rica, Ecuador, El Salvador, Honduras, Panama, Paraguay, and Peru (as El Gran Show), and on the European continent, Bulgaria, the Czech Republic, Slovakia (as Tanečný pre Dream) and Romania (as Dansez pentru tine).

== Legal controversy ==
In September 2011, Italy's Canale 5 owned by Mediaset launched a series, hosted by Barbara D'Urso, called Baila, based on Bailando por un Sueño. The owners of Dancing With The Stars, BBC Worldwide, and local RAI presenter Milly Carlucci took Mediaset to court, arguing that Baila infringed on the rights of Dancing With The Stars. The court agreed, finding that the addition of 'dreamers' was not a sufficient difference in the format, and a later court upheld that judgement in November 2011. Baila was quickly taken off the air.

== Bailando por un Sueño worldwide ==
Central America (regional) El Salvador / Costa Rica / Honduras / Panama: Title: Reto Centroamericano de Baile; TV channel: Telecorporación Salvadoreña (El Salvador) /; Teletica (Costa Rica) /; Televicentro (Honduras) /; Telemetro (Panama); Hosts: Luciana Sandoval (El Salvador) /; Edgar Silva (Costa Rica) /; Salvador Nasralla (Honduras) /; Sasha Arias (Panama)	2011: Season 1: Nancy Dobles and Diego Torres (Costa Rica); 2012: Season 2: Jessica, Billy, Andrea, Henry, Laura and Héctor (El Salvador)
Argentina: Title: Bailando; TV channel: El Trece; Host: Marcelo Tinelli	2006: Season 1: Carmen Barbieri and Cristian Ponce; 2006: Season 2: Florencia De La V and Miguel Rodríguez; 2006: Season 3: Carla Conte and Guillermo Conforte; 2007: Season 4: Celina Rucci and Matias Sayago; 2008: Season 5: Carolina "Pampita" Ardohain and Nicolás Armengol; 2009: El Musical de tus Sueños: Silvina Escudero & team; 2010: Season 6 - Bailando 2010: Fabio "La Mole" Moli and Mariana Conci / Julia Cejas; 2011: Season 7 - Bailando 2011: Hernán Piquín and Noelia Pompa; 2012: Season 8 - Bailando 2012: Hernán Piquín and Noelia Pompa; 2014: Season 9 - Bailando 2014: Anita Martínez and Marcos "Bicho" Gómez; 2015: Season 10 - Bailando 2015: Federico Bal and Laura Fernández; 2016: Season 11 - Bailando 2016: Peter Alfonso and Florencia Vigna; 2017: Season 12 - Bailando 2017: Florencia Vigna and Gonzalo Gerber; 2018: Season 13 - Bailando 2018: Julián Serrano and Sofía Morandi; 2019: Season 14 - Bailando 2019: Nicolás Occhiato and Florencia Jazmín Peña; ~~2020: Season 15 - Bailando 2020:~~ Canceled by COVID-19; 2021: Season 16 Bailando 2021 (La academia): In broadcast
Bolivia: Title: Bailando por un Sueño; TV channel: Red UNO; Hosts: Carlos Rocabado Laura La Faye	2015: Season 1: Unknown
Brazil: Title: Bailando por um sonho; TV channel: SBT; Hosts: Silvio Santos Cynthia Benini	2006: Season 1: Patrícia Salvador and Leonardo
Bulgaria: Title: Bailando: Сцена на мечтите; TV channel: Nova TV; Hosts: Stefania Koleva Georgi Mamalev	2010: Season 1: Krasimir Karakachanov and Rada Racheva
Chile: Title: Baila! Al ritmo de un sueño; TV channel: Bang TV Chilevisión; Host: Simoney Romero, Eva Gómez, Cristian Sánchez	2013: Season 1: Faloon Larraguibel and Alejandro Herrera; 2014: Season 2: Stephanie Méndez and William Orrock
Colombia: Title: Bailando por un sueño; TV channel: RCN; Hosts: Paola Turbay and Julián Román	2006: Season 1: Maria Cecilia Sánchez and Jose Andulfo Leal Garay; 2006: Season 2: Carolina Cruz; 2006: Season 3: Valentina Rendon and Felipe
Costa Rica: Title: Bailando por un Sueño; TV channel: Teletica; Host: Edgar Silva	2007: Season 1: Mauricio Hoffman and Hazel Linares; 2008: Season 2: Viviana Calderón and Franklin Calderon; 2010: Season 3: Nancy Dobles and Diego Torres
Costa Rica / Panama: Title: Bailando por un sueño: Reto Costa Rica-Panamá; TV channel: Teletica (Costa Rica) / Telemetro Canal 13 (Panama); Hosts: Edgar Silva (Costa Rica) and Karen Chalmers (Panama)	2008: Season 1: Viviana Calderón and Franklin Calderón
Czech Republic: Title: Bailando - Tančím pro tebe; TV channel: TV Nova; Host: Dalibor Gondík and Kristina Kloubková	2007: Season 1: Jana Gonsiorová and Tomáš Krejčíř
Ecuador: Title: Bailando por un Sueño; TV channel: Gama TV; Host: Yuli Maiocchi	2006: Season 1: Sofía Caiche; 2007: Season 2: Junior Monteiro; 2008: Season 3: Juancho Lopez
El Salvador: Title: Bailando por un Sueño; TV channel: Telecorporación Salvadoreña; Host: Luciana Sandoval	2008: Season 1: Karen Solís and Giancarlo Reyes; 2009: Season 2: Álex Erazo and Kathleen Ramos; 2010: Season 3: Kahory Trujillo and Mauricio Franco
Honduras: Title: Bailando por un Sueño; TV channel: Televicentro; Hosts: Salvador Nasralla and Gabriella Ortega	2010: Season 1: Samuel Martínez "Moncho" and Fabiola Guillen; 2012: Season 2: Stefany Galeano and Onel
Mexico: Title: Bailando por un Sueño (Mexico); TV channel: Televisa; Hosts: Adal Ramones and Liza Echeverría (2005); Marco Antonio Regil (2006); Adrián Uribe and Livia Brito (2014); Javier Poza and Barbara Islas (2017)	2005: Season 1: Latin Lover and Mariana Vallejo; 2005: Season 2: Alessandra Rosaldo and Israel Aquino; 2005: Ganadores de ganadores: Latin Lover and Mariana Vallejo; 2006: Bailando por la Boda de mis Sueños: Jacqueline García / Josué and Margarita; 2014: Season 3: María León and Adrián Arellano; 2017: Season 4: Adrián Di Monte and Montserrat Yescas
Slovakia: Title: Tanečný pre Dream; TV channel: Markíza; Hosts: Adela Banášová and Martin "Pyco" Rausch	2006: Season 1: Zuzana Fialová and Pedro Modrovský; 2008: Season 2: Michaela Čobejová and Tomáš Surovec; 2009: Season 3: Juraj Mokrý and Katarina Štumpfová; 2010: Season 4: Nela Pocisková and Peter Modrovský
Panama: Title: Bailando por un Sueño; TV channel: Telemetro Canal 13; Hosts: Luis Eduardo Quirós and Jenia Nenzen	2006: Season 1: Bosco Vallarino and Leslie Ramírez; 2007: Season 2: Lula López and José Luis Rodríguez; 2008: Season 3: Andrea Peréz and Ángel Jiménez
Paraguay: Title: Bailando por un sueño (2006-2008); Menchi el Show (2009); TV channel: Telefuturo; Hosts: Menchi Barriocanal (2006-2009)	2006: Season 1: Florencia Gismondi and Oscar Duarte; 2007: Season 2: Pedro Guggiari and Maria Elsa Núñez; 2007: Season 3: Melissa Quiñonez and Justo Sánchez; 2008: Bailando por la Boda de mis Sueños: Helem Roux and Nahuel Ortiz; 2009: Season 4: Julio González Abdala and Maia Ayala
Paraguay: Title: Baila conmigo Paraguay; TV channel: Telefuturo; Host: Kike Casanova	2010: Season 1: Nadia Portillo "La Kchorra" and Carlos Céspedes; 2011: Season 2: Nadia Portillo "La Kchorra" and Jorge "Coco" Bordón; 2012: Season 3: Fabisol Garcete and Rodrigo Servín; 2013: Season 4: Marilina Bogado and Diestro Rivas; 2014: Season 5: Unknown
Peru: Title: El Gran Show; TV channel: América TV; Hosts: Gisela Valcárcel; Cristian Rivero; Óscar López Arias; Paco Bazán; Jaime "Choca" Mandros; Miguel Arce	2010: Season 1 - El Gran Show 2010 (season 1): Gisela Ponce de León and Rayder Vásquez; 2010: Season 2 - El Gran Show 2010 (season 2): Belén Estévez and Gian Frank Navarro; 2010: Season 3 - El Gran Show 2010: Reyes del Show: Miguel Rebosio and Fabianne Hayashida; 2011: Season 4 - El Gran Show 2011 (season 1): Raúl Zuazo and Dayana Calla; 2011: Season 5 - El Gran Show 2011 (season 2): Jesús Neyra and Lucero Clavijo; 2011: Season 6 - El Gran Show 2011: Reyes del Show: Belén Estévez and Waldir Felipa; 2012: Season 7 - El Gran Show 2012 (season 1): Jhoany Vegas and Pedro Ibáñez; 2012: Season 8 - El Gran Show 2012: Special Edition: Karen Dejo and Oreykel Hidalgo; 2013: Season 9 - El Gran Show 2013 (season 1): Emilia Drago and Sergio Lois; 2013: Season 10 - El Gran Show 2013 (season 2): Gino Pesaressi and Jacqueline Alfaro; 2013: Season 11 - El Gran Show 2013: Reyes del Show: Carolina Cano and Eduardo Pastrana; 2015: Season 12 - El Gran Show 2015 (season 1): Melissa Loza and Sergio Álvarez; 2015: Season 13 - El Gran Show 2015 (season 2): Ismael La Rosa and Michelle Vallejos; 2015: Season 14 - El Gran Show 2015: Reyes del Show: Yahaira Plasencia and George Neyra; 2016: Season 15 - El Gran Show 2016 (season 1): Milett Figueroa and Patricio Quiñones; 2016: Season 16 - El Gran Show 2016 (season 2): Rosangela Espinoza and Lucas Piró; 2016: Season 17 - El Gran Show 2016: Reyes del Show: Rosangela Espinoza and Lucas Piró; 2017: Season 18 - El Gran Show 2017 (season 1): Diana Sánchez and Maylor Pérez; 2017: Season 19 - El Gran Show 2017 (season 2): Brenda Carvalho and Kevin Ubillus; 2017: Season 20 - El Gran Show 2017 (season 3): Anahí de Cárdenas and George Neyra; 2017: Season 21 - El Gran Show 2017: Reyes del Show: Brenda Carvalho and Pedro Ibáñez
Romania: Title: Dansez pentru tine; TV channel: Pro TV; Hosts: Iulia Vantur and Stefan Banica	2006: Season 1: Andra and Florin Birică; 2006: Season 2: Victor Slav and Carmen Stepan; 2007: Season 3: Cosmin Stan and Doina Ocu; 2007: Season 4: Alex Velea and Cristina Stoicescu; 2008: Season 5: Andreea Bălan and Petrișor Ruge; 2008: Season 6: Giulia Anghelescu and Andrei Ștefan; 2009: Season 7: Monica Irimia and Darius Belu; 2009: Season 8: Jean de la Craiova and Sandra Neacșu; 2010: Season 9: Cătălin Moroșanu and Magdalena Ciorobea; 2010: Season 10: Octavian Strunilă and Ella Dumitru; 2011: Season 11: Corina Bud and Eduard Vasile; 2011: Season 12: Jojo and Ionuț Tănase; 2012: Season 13: Roxana Ionescu and George Boghian; 2013: Season 14: Ilinca Vandici & Răzvan Marton

== International events ==
Bailando por un Sueño: Campeonato Internacional de Baile (Meaning Dancing for a Dream: International Dance Championship) was a pan-national competition between winners from various countries.

There were two such contests one in 2007 and another in 2010.
