= El Gran Show season 21 =

El Gran Show: Reyes del show
- Season 21
- Hosted by: Gisela Valcárcel; Aldo Díaz
- Judges: Morella Petrozzi; Pachi Valle Riestra; Carlos Cacho; Tilsa Lozano; Belén Estévez
- Celebrity winner: Brenda Carvalho
- Professional winner: Pedro Ibáñez
- No. of episodes: 7

Release
- Original network: América Televisión
- Original release: October 21 – December 9, 2017

Season chronology
- ← Previous; Season 20

Reyes del Show (transl. Show Kings) is the season four of the 2017 edition of El Gran Show premiered on October 21, 2017.

On October 28, a special program called "El Otro Show" was presented, which celebrated the 30-year career of Gisela Valcárcel. For this reason the second week was presented on the following date.

== Cast ==
=== Couples ===
The celebrities who would compete this season were scheduled to be the first three of the three seasons, but due to various issues, four of them were not part of the cast. Christian Domínguez did not participate in the season due to personal issues, so he had to pay a penalty for breach of contract. Anahí de Cárdenas and Belén Estévez did not participate due to injuries, while Andrea Luna's absence was not specified, until she announced days later that the producers of the program did not decide to call her for unspecified reasons. In the first week it was announced that Dominguez's replacement would be the dancer Edson Dávila (being the second dancer, after Lucas Piró, to participate as a hero) and that Karen Dejo would replace Estévez. On October 28, it was announced that former participant Leslie Shaw would return to the program to replace Anahí de Cárdenas, being paired with Waldir Felipa (Estévez's dance partner).

The dancers Maylor Pérez, Kevin Ubillus and Alexa Montoya were replaced by Sergio Álvarez, Pedro Ibáñez and Melanie Salazar, respectively.

Hero / Heroine	Notability (known for)	Professional partner (Note: During Week 4, the celebrities performed with a different professional partner as part of the "Partner Switch-Up" for that week only. All celebrities returned to their original partners on Week 5.)	Status	Ref.
César Távara	Manager & businessman	Melanie Salazar	Eliminated 1st on November 4, 2017	
Edson Dávila	Dancer	Gabriela Herrera; Maru Piró (week 4)	Eliminated 2nd on November 18, 2017	
Lucas Piro	Dancer & TV personality	Maru Piro; Gabriela Herrera (week 4)	Eliminated 3rd on November 25, 2017	
Leslie Shaw	Model, singer & actress	Waldir Felipa; Ítalo Valcárcel (weeka 4)	Eliminated 4th on December 2, 2017	
Vania Bludau	Model	Ítalo Valcárcel; Oreykel Hidalgo (week 4) (Note: During week 1, Oreykel Hidalgo also danced with Bludau.)	Withdrew on December 9, 2017	
Karen Dejo	Actress & TV host	Oreykel Hidalgo; Waldir Felipa (week 4)	Third place on December 9, 2017	
Diana Sánchez	Reality TV star	Sergio Álvarez; Pedro Ibáñez (week 4)	Runner-up on December 9, 2017	
Brenda Carvalho	Axé star	Pedro Ibáñez; Sergio Álvarez (week 4)	Winners on December 9, 2017	

=== Host and judges ===
Gisela Valcárcel and Aldo Díaz returned as host while Morella Petrozzi, Carlos Cacho, Tilsa Lozano and Pachi Valle Riestra returned as judges. Belén Estévez, who was unable to participate in the show due to an injury, joined the season as the VIP judge. On December 9, actor & comedian Carlos Alcántara replaces Belén Estevéz.

== Scoring charts ==
Couple	Place	1	2	3	4	5	6	7 (Note: The scores placed in the table are only partial, since the votes of the invited judges are not revealed.)
Brenda & Pedro	1	48	45	43	45	43	94	145
Diana & Sergio	2	49	51	46	46	42	84	154
Karen & Oreykel	3	42	42	47	44	43	92	138
Vania & Ítalo	4	42	47	42	43	40	77	—
Leslie & Waldir	5	—	45	43	36	41	81	
Lucas & Maru	6	48	51	49	41	55		
Edson & Gabriela	7	40	47	38	41			
César & Melanie	8	34	38					

Red numbers indicate the sentenced for each week
Green numbers indicate the best steps for each week
"—" indicates the couple(s) did not dance that week
the couple was eliminated that week
the couple was safe in the duel
the couple was eliminated that week and safe with a lifeguard
this couple withdrew from the competition
the winning couple
the runner-up couple
the third-place couple

=== Average score chart ===
This table only counts dances scored on a 40-point scale. (Note: The VIP judge scores are excluded, the 11 scores were changed to 10.)

Rank by average	Place	Couple	Total points	Number of dances	Average
1	6	Lucas & Maru	191	5	38.2
2	2	Diana & Sergio	374	10	37.4
3	1	Brenda & Pedro	369	10	36.9
4	3	Karen & Oreykel	364	10	36.4
5	4	Vania & Ítalo	237	7	33.9
6	5	Leslie & Waldir	202	6	33.7
7	7	Edson & Gabriela	133	4	33.3
8	8	César & Melanie	61	2	30.5

=== Highest and lowest scoring performances ===
The best and worst performances in each dance according to the judges' 40-point scale are as follows:

Dance	Highest scored dancer(s)	Highest score	Lowest scored dancer(s)	Lowest score
Bachata	Diana Sánchez	40	César Távara	29
Cumbia	César Távara	32	—	—
Salsa	Edson Dávila	37	Vania Bludau	32
Jazz	Lucas Piró; Diana Sánchez	40	Edson Dávila	33
Quebradita	Edson Dávila	31	—	—
Tango	Karen Dejo	38	—	—
Disco	Brenda Carvalho	39	Leslie Shaw	34
Paso doble	Vania Bludau	34	—	—
Huaylasrh	Lucas Piró	39	—	—
Contemporary	Lucas Piró; Diana Sánchez	40	Vania Bludau; Leslie Shaw	32
Hip-hop	Brenda Carvalho	37	Leslie Shaw	30
Freestyle	Karen Dejo; Brenda Carvalho	40	Vania Bludau	32
Bollywood	Diana Sánchez	37	—	—
Rumba	Diana Sánchez	40	Brenda Carvalho	37

=== Couples' highest and lowest scoring dances ===
Scores are based upon a potential 40-point maximum.

Couple	Highest scoring dance(s)	Lowest scoring dance(s)
Brenda & Pedro	Freestyle (40)	Salsa (34)
Diana & Sergio	Bachata, Jazz, Contemporary & Rumba (40)	Salsa & Freestyle (34)
Karen & Oreykel	Freestyle (40)	Bachata & Jazz (2x) (34)
Vania & Ítalo	Jazz (37)	Freestyle & Contemporary (32)
Leslie & Waldir	Freestyle (37)	Hip-hop (30)
Lucas & Maru	Jazz & Contemporary (40)	Contemporary (33)
Edson & Gabriela	Salsa (37)	Quebradita (31)
César & Melanie	Cumbia (32)	Bachata (29)

== Weekly scores ==
Individual judges' scores in the charts below (given in parentheses) are listed in this order from left to right: Morella Petrozzi, Carlos Cacho, Tilsa Lozano, Pachi Valle Riestra, Belén Estévez.

=== Week 1: Acrobatic Bachata Night ===
The couples danced acrobatic bachata in which the celebrities were blindfolded.

Oreykel Hidalgo, dancer who managed to reach the final with Karen Dejo and Vania Bludau in their respective seasons, danced with the two and then decided who would participate for the rest of the season, choosing the first. Finally, the production decided that Bludau would dance with Italo Valcárcel of the next week.

Running order

Couple	Scores	Dance	Music	Result
Lucas & Maru	48 (10, 9, 10, 10, 9)	Bachata	"Te Vas"—Grupo Extra	Safe
Vania & Oreykel	42 (9, 8, 9, 9, 7)	Bachata	"Te Extraño"—Xtreme	Safe
Karen & Oreykel	43 (9, 8, 9, 9, 8)	Bachata	"Te Extraño"—Xtreme	Safe
Brenda & Pedro	48 (9, 9, 10, 10, 10)	Bachata	"Todo por tu Amor"—Xtreme	Safe
Diana & Sergio	49 (10, 10, 10, 10, 9)	Bachata	"Tengo Un Amor"—Toby Love	Best steps
César & Melanie	34 (7, 7, 8, 7, 5)	Bachata	"Dos Locos"—Monchy & Alexandra	Sentenced
Edson & Gabriela	40 (8, 8, 8, 8, 8)	Bachata	"Imitadora"—Romeo Santos	Sentenced

=== Week 2: Dances with Chairs Night ===
The couples (except those sentenced) danced jazz using chairs in the performance. In addition, the versus was made, where only two couples faced each other, the winner would take two extra points plus the couples who gave their support votes.

Leslie Shaw, former participant of the show, entered from this week as she replaced Anahí de Cárdenas, being paired with Waldir Felipa.

Running order

Couple	Scores	Dance	Music	Result
César & Melanie	38 (9, 7, 8, 8, 6)	Cumbia*	"Viento"—Chacalón / "Pedacito de Mi Vida"—Grupo 5	—
Edson & Gabriela	45 (9, 9, 10, 9, 8)	Salsa*	"La Malanga Brava"—Joe Cuba / "La Malanga"—Mercadonegro	Safe
Karen & Oreykel	42 (9, 8, 9, 8, 8)	Jazz	"Bad Romance"—Lady Gaga	Sentenced
Lucas & Maru	49 (10, 10, 10, 10, 9)	Jazz	"Está Pegao"—Proyecto Uno	Best steps
Leslie & Waldir	43 (9, 10, 9, 8, 7)	Jazz	"Cryin'"—Aerosmith	Sentenced
Diana & Sergio	49 (10, 10, 10, 10, 9)	Jazz	"Lo Hecho Está Hecho"—Shakira	Best steps
Brenda & Pedro	43 (8, 9, 9, 9, 8)	Jazz	"Mi Gente"—J Balvin & Willy William	Sentenced
Vania & Ítalo	45 (10, 9, 9, 9, 8)	Jazz	"Earned It"—The Weeknd	Safe

The versus
Couple (Supporters)	Judges' votes	Dance	Music	Result
Lucas & Maru (Brenda, Diana, Edson, Leslie, Vania)	Lucas, Lucas, Karen, Lucas, Lucas	Contemporary	"Abrázame Muy Fuerte"—Juan Gabriel	Winners (2 pts)
Karen & Oreykel (César)	Lucas, Lucas, Karen, Lucas, Lucas	Contemporary	"Abrázame Muy Fuerte"—Juan Gabriel	Losers

The duel*

- César & Melanie: Eliminated
- Edson & Gabriela: Safe

=== Week 3: Challenge Night ===
The couples performed a dance in which they had to perform a specific challenge.

Running order

Couple	Scores	Dance	Music	Result
Edson & Gabriela	38 (8, 8, 8, 7, 7)	Quebradita	"Pelotero a la Bola"—La Adictiva	Sentenced
Karen & Oreykel	47 (10, 9, 10, 9, 9)	Tango*	"La cumparsita"—Carlos Lazzari	Safe
Leslie & Waldir	43 (9, 8, 9, 8, 9)	Disco*	"Knock on Wood"—Amii Stewart	Safe
Brenda & Pedro	43 (9, 8, 8, 9, 9)	Salsa*	"Lejos de Tí"—Chiquito Team Band	Safe
Vania & Ítalo	42 (9, 9, 8, 8, 8)	Paso doble	"Malagueña"—Brian Setzer	Sentenced
Diana & Sergio	46 (10, 10, 9, 8, 9)	Bachata	"Quitémonos la Ropa"—Dani J	Safe
Lucas & Maru	49 (10, 11, 10, 9, 9)	Huaylasrh	"Tuquy Puquia"—Miki González / "Papá"—Los Super Mañaneros	Best steps

The duel*

- Brenda & Pedro: Safe
- Leslie & Waldir: Safe
- Karen & Oreykel: Eliminated (but safe with the lifeguard)

=== Week 4: Switch-Up Under the Rain Night ===
The couples performed one unlearned dance under the rain with a different partner selected by the production. In the little-train only the women participate dancing reggaeton.

Running order

Couple	Scores	Dance	Music	Result
Karen & Waldir	44 (9, 9, 9, 9, 8)	Bachata	"Qué Bonito"—Vicky Corbacho	Safe
Lucas & Gabriela	41 (9, 8, 8, 8, 8)	Contemporary	"Try"—Pink	Sentenced
Edson & Maru	41 (8, 8, 9, 8, 8)	Jazz*	"Hey Pachuco"—Royal Crown Revue	—
Vania & Oreykel	41 (9, 9, 8, 8, 7)	Hip-hop*	"Chantaje"—Shakira feat. Maluma	Safe
Brenda & Sergio	45 (10, 10, 8, 9, 8)	Hip-hop	"Como Antes"—Yandel feat. Wisin	Safe
Leslie & Ítalo	36 (8, 7, 8, 7, 6)	Hip-hop	"Perro Fiel"—Shakira feat. Nicky Jam	Sentenced
Diana & Pedro	46 (10, 9, 9, 9, 9)	Jazz	"Candyman"—Christina Aguilera	Best steps

The little train
Participants	Judges' votes	Dance	Music	Winner
Women	Diana, Maru, Vania, Vania, Vania	Reggaeton	"Hula Hoop"—Daddy Yankee	Vania (2 pts)

The duel*

- Edson & Gabriela: Eliminated
- Vania & Ítalo: Safe

=== Week 5: Acrobatic Salsa Night ===
The couples (except those sentenced) danced acrobatic salsa. In the little-train only the women participate dancing reggaeton.

Running order

Couple	Scores	Dance	Music	Result
Vania & Ítalo	40 (9, 7, 8, 9, 7)	Salsa	"Opao"—Chiquito Team Band	Sentenced
Leslie & Waldir	41 (8, 9, 8, 8, 8)	Hip-hop*	"Volverte a Ver" / "Decide"—Leslie Shaw	Sentenced
Lucas & Maru	53 (11, 11, 11, 10, 10)	Contemporary*	"Te Soñe"—Leila Doktorowicz	—
Diana & Sergio	42 (8, 8, 9, 9, 8)	Salsa	"Bemba Colora"—Celia Cruz	Safe
Brenda & Pedro	43 (9, 8, 9, 9, 8)	Salsa	"Quimbara"—Celia Cruz	Best steps
Karen & Oreykel	43 (8, 10, 9, 9, 7)	Salsa	"La rumba buena"—Orquesta La 33	Best steps

The little train
Participants	Judges' votes	Dance	Music	Winner
Women	Maru, Karen, Maru, Maru, Vania	Reggaeton	"Shaky Shaky"—Daddy Yankee "Mueve el toto"—Apache Ness & Me Gusta feat. Juan Quin & Dago	Maru (2 pts)

The duel*

- Leslie & Waldir: Safe
- Lucas & Maru: Eliminated

=== Week 6: Semifinal ===
The couples dance freestyle and acrobatic contemporary. This week, none couples were sentenced.

Running order

Couple	Scores	Dance	Music	Result
Karen & Oreykel	49 (10, 10, 10, 10, 9)	Freestyle	"On the Floor"—Jennifer Lopez feat. Pitbull	Safe
Karen & Oreykel	43 (8, 9, 9, 9, 8)	Contemporary	"Si Tú Eres Mi Hombre"—Ángela Carrasco	Safe
Vania & Ítalo	39 (8, 8, 8, 8, 7)	Freestyle*	"Magalenha"—Bellini & Mendoça Do Rio	Safe
Vania & Ítalo	38 (8, 8, 8, 8, 6)	Contemporary	"Él Me Mintió"—Amanda Miguel	Safe
Leslie & Waldir	44 (9, 10, 9, 9, 7)	Freestyle*	"Cuba 2012 (DJ Rebel Remix)"—Latin Formation	—
Leslie & Waldir	37 (7, 10, 8, 7, 5)	Contemporary	"Always"—Bon Jovi	—
Diana & Sergio	42 (8, 8, 9, 9, 8)	Freestyle	"Latino"—Proyecto Uno	Safe
Diana & Sergio	42 (9, 9, 9, 8, 7)	Contemporary	"I Don't Want to Miss a Thing"—Aerosmith	Safe
Brenda & Pedro	52 (11, 10, 10, 10, 11)	Freestyle	"Mujer Latina"—Thalía / "Conga" / "Oye!"—Gloria Estefan	Best steps
Brenda & Pedro	42 (8, 9, 10, 8, 7)	Contemporary	"Angels"—Robbie Williams	Best steps

The duel*

- Leslie & Waldir: Eliminated
- Vania & Ítalo: Safe

=== Week 7: Final ===
Individual judges' scores in the chart below (given in parentheses) are listed in this order from left to right: Morella Petrozzi, Carlos Cacho, Tilsa Lozano, Pachi Valle Riestra, Carlos Alcántara.

The three finalist couples performed freestyle, contemporary in which they were blindfolded and rumba.

Due to an injury, Vania Bludau had to withdraw from the competition, so he could not play the final of the season with Ítalo Valcárcel.

Running order (Part 1)

Couple	Scores	Dance	Music	Result
Karen & Oreykel	42 (9, 8, 9, 8, 8)	Freestyle	"Where Have You Been"—Rihanna	Third place
Karen & Oreykel	47 (9, 10, 10, 9, 9)	Contemporary	"Bésame"—Camila	Third place
Karen & Oreykel	49 (10, 10, 10, 9, 10)	Rumba	"My Immortal"—Evanescence	Third place
Brenda & Pedro	49 (10, 10, 11, 9, 9)	Freestyle	"Hush Hush; Hush Hush"—The Pussycat Dolls / "Proud Mary"—Tina Turner	Winner
Brenda & Pedro	49 (10, 10, 9, 10, 10)	Contemporary	"Someone like You"—Adele	Winner
Brenda & Pedro	47 (9, 9, 9, 10, 10)	Rumba	"Hoy Tengo Ganas de Ti"—Alejandro Fernández feat. Christina Aguilera	Winner
Diana & Sergio	46 (9, 9, 10, 9, 9)	Freestyle	"Ishq Kamina"—Alka Yagnik & Sonu Nigam	Runner-up
Diana & Sergio	53 (10, 11, 11, 10, 11)	Contemporary	"Chandelier"—Sia	Runner-up
Diana & Sergio	55 (11, 11, 11, 11, 11)	Rumba	"Hasta Que Vuelvas Conmigo"—Gian Marco	Runner-up

== Dance chart ==
The celebrities and professional partners will dance one of these routines for each corresponding week:

- Week 1: Bachata (Acrobatic Bachata Night)
- Week 2: Jazz & the versus (Dances with Chairs Night)
- Week 3: One unlearned dance (Challenge Night)
- Week 4: One unlearned dance & the little train (Switch-Up Under the Rain Night)
- Week 5: Salsa & the little train (Acrobatic Salsa Night)
- Week 6: Freestyle & contemporary (Semifinals)
- Week 7: Favorite dance, contemporary and rumba (Final)

Couple	Week 1	Week 2	Week 3	Week 4	Week 5	Week 6		Week 7		
Brenda & Pedro	Bachata	Jazz	Salsa	Hip-hop (Brenda & Sergio)	Salsa	Freestyle	Contemporary	Freestyle	Contemporary	Rumba
Diana & Sergio	Bachata	Jazz	Bachata	Jazz (Diana & Pedro)	Salsa	Freestyle	Contemporary	Freestyle	Contemporary	Rumba
Karen & Oreykel	Bachata	Jazz	Tango	Bachata (Karen & Waldir)	Salsa	Freestyle	Contemporary	Freestyle	Contemporary	Rumba
Vania & Ítalo	Bachata	Jazz	Paso doble	Hip-hop (Vania & Oreykel)	Salsa	Freestyle	Contemporary			
Leslie & Waldir	—	Jazz	Disco	Hip-hop (Leslie & Ítalo)	Hip-hop	Freestyle	Contemporary			
Lucas & Maru	Bachata	Jazz	Huaylasrh	Contemporary (Lucas & Gabriela)	Contemporary					
Edson & Gabriela	Bachata	Salsa	Quebradita	Jazz (Edson & Maru)						
César & Melanie	Bachata	Cumbia								

Modalities of competition
Couple	Week 2	Week 4	Week 5
Brenda & Pedro	Contemporary	Reggaeton	Reggaeton
Diana & Sergio	Contemporary	Reggaeton	Reggaeton
Karen & Oreykel	Contemporary	Reggaeton	Reggaeton
Vania & Ítalo	Contemporary	Reggaeton	Reggaeton
Leslie & Waldir	Contemporary	Reggaeton	Reggaeton
Lucas & Maru	Contemporary	Reggaeton	Reggaeton
Edson & Gabriela	Contemporary	Reggaeton	
César & Melanie	Contemporary		

Highest scoring dance
Lowest scoring dance
Gained bonus points for winning
Gained no bonus points for losing
Danced, but not scored
In Italic indicate the dance performed in the duel

== Guest judges ==
Date	Guest judge	Occupation(s)
December 9, 2017	Efraín Aguilar	Producer & director
December 9, 2017	Armando Barrientos	Professional dancer, choreographer & Art director
December 9, 2017	Patricia Cano	Professional dancer
December 9, 2017	Luis Dettling	Professional dancer & choreographer
December 9, 2017	Deklan Guzmán	Professional dancer, choreographer & dance director
December 9, 2017	Gina Natteri	Professional dancer & dance director
December 9, 2017	Ernesto Pimentel	TV host, director & producer
December 9, 2017	Verónica Uranga Prado	Professional dancer, choreographer & dance director
December 9, 2017	Miguel Valladares	Producer
December 9, 2017	Fernando Zevallos	Art director
