= El Gran Show season 20 =

El Gran Show: La Revancha
- Season 20
- Hosted by: Gisela Valcárcel; Aldo Díaz
- Judges: Morella Petrozzi; Pachi Valle Riestra; Carlos Cacho; Tilsa Lozano
- Celebrity winner: Anahí de Cárdenas
- Professional winner: George Neyra
- No. of episodes: 7

Release
- Original network: América Televisión
- Original release: September 2 – October 14, 2017

Season chronology
- ← Previous; Season 19 Next → Season 21

Season three of the 2017 edition of El Gran Show premiered on September 2, 2017.

The season was also named "La Revancha", due to the return of former participants for a new opportunity to win the competition.

On October 14, 2017, Anahí de Cárdenas and her professional dancer George Neyra were crowned champions, Vania Bludau and Oreykel Hidalgo finished second, while César Távara and Alexa Montoya finished third. In this way, Neyra became the second professional dancer two times champion, after Lucas Piró, since he also won Reyes de Show of 2015.

== Cast ==
=== Couples ===
On September 2, 2017, participants and their professional dancers were presented at the first week. Nine celebrities were announced, of which six returned from previous seasons and three were new to the show (Emilio Jaime, Fernanda Kanno, and Aldo Olcese). During the show, boxer Jonathan Maicelo left the competition due to an injury, so former contestant Cesar Távara took his place in the competition.

Celebrity	Notability (known for)	Professional partner	Status	Ref.
Aldo Olcese	Former footballer	Gabriella Ramírez	Eliminated 1st on September 16, 2017	
Fernanda Kanno	Journalist & race driver	Sergio Álvarez	Eliminated 2nd on September 30, 2017	
Angie Jibaja	Model	Horacio Vera	Eliminated 3rd on October 7, 2017	
Melissa Klug	Television personality	Ítalo Valcárcel	Eliminated 4th on October 14, 2017	
Christian Zuárez	Singer	Isabel Martínez	Eliminated 5th on October 14, 2017	
Emilio Jaime	Model & singer	Gabriela Herrera	Eliminated 6th on October 14, 2017	
César Távara	Manager & businessman	Alexa Montoya	Third place on October 14, 2017	
Vania Bludau	Model	Oreykel Hidalgo	Runner-up on October 14, 2017	
Anahí de Cárdenas	Actress, singer & model	George Neyra	Winner on October 14, 2017	

=== Hosts and judges ===
Gisela Valcárcel and Aldo Díaz returned as host while Morella Petrozzi, Carlos Cacho, Tilsa Lozano and Pachi Valle Riestra returned as judges.

== Scoring charts ==
Couple	Place	1	2	3	4	5	6	7 (Note: The scores placed in the table are only partial, since the votes of the invited judges are not revealed.)		
Couple	Place	1	2	3	4	5	6	Top 6	Top 5	Top 3
Anahí & George	1	33	37	33	32	38	41	40	40	38
Vania & Oreykel	2	28	32	37	40	38	39	40	36	37
César & Alexa	3	27	35	36	33	29	36	34	34	31
Emilio & Gabriela	4	29	33	32	33	34	34	35	31	
Christian & Isabel	5	29	31	31	35	33	34	34	31	
Melissa & Ítalo	6	29	29	31	29	31	31	31		
Angie & Horacio	7	—N/a	33	30	36	31	31			
Fernanda & Sergio	8	29	34	35	32	34				
Aldo & Gabriella	9	22	26	21						

Red numbers indicate the sentenced for each week
Green numbers indicate the best steps for each week
"—" indicates the couple(s) did not dance that week
the couple was eliminated that week
the couple was safe in the duel
the couple was eliminated that week and safe with a lifeguard
the winning couple
the runner-up couple
the third-place couple

=== Average score chart ===
This table only counts dances scored on a 40-point scale.

Rank by average	Place	Couple	Total points	Number of dances	Average
1	1	Anahí & George	327	9	36.3
1	2	Vania & Oreykel	327	9	36.3
3	8	Fernanda & Sergio	164	5	32.8
3	3	César & Alexa	295	9	32.8
5	4	Emilio & Gabriela	261	8	32.6
6	5	Christian & Isabel	258	8	32.3
7	7	Angie & Horacio	161	5	32.2
8	6	Melissa & Ítalo	211	7	30.1
9	9	Aldo & Gabriella	69	3	23.0

=== Highest and lowest scoring performances ===
The best and worst performances in each dance according to the judges' 40-point scale are as follows:

Dance	Highest scored dancer(s)	Highest score	Lowest scored dancer(s)	Lowest score
Reggaeton	Vania Bludau	38	Jonathan Maicelo	27
Salsa	Anahí de Cárdenas	39	Aldo Olcese	22
Cumbia	Anahí de Cárdenas	37	Vania Bludau	28
Bachata	Vania Bludau	40	Melissa Klug	31
Freestyle	Vania Bludau	40	Melissa Klug	29
Merengue	César Távara	29	—	—
Jazz	Anahí de Cárdenas	39	Angie Jibaja	31
Tango	Anahí de Cárdenas	38	Christian Zuárez	34
Lambada	Angie Jibaja	31	—	—
Contemporary	Anahí de Cárdenas	39	—	—
Festejo	César Távara	34	—	—
Viennese waltz	Anahí de Cárdenas; Vania Bludau	37	César Távara	31

=== Couples' highest and lowest scoring dances ===
Scores are based upon a potential 40-point maximum.

Couple	Highest scoring dance(s)	Lowest scoring dance(s)
Anahí & George	Jazz, Contemporary & Salsa (39)	Freestyle (32)
Vania & Oreykel	Freestyle & Bachata (40)	Cumbia (28)
César & Alexa	Bachata & Salsa (36)	Reggaeton (27)
Emilio & Gabriela	Jazz (35)	Reggaeton (29)
Christian & Isabel	Freestyle (35)	Cumbia (29)
Melissa & Ítalo	Jazz, Bachata & Salsa (x2) (31)	Salsa, Cumbia & Freestyle (29)
Angie & Horacio	Freestyle (36)	Salsa (30)
Fernanda & Sergio	Bachata (35)	Cumbia (29)
Aldo & Gabriella	Salsa (26)	Cumbia (21)

== Weekly scores ==
Individual judges' scores in the charts below (given in parentheses) are listed in this order from left to right: Morella Petrozzi, Carlos Cacho, Tilsa Lozano, Pachi Valle Riestra.

=== Week 1: First Dances ===
The couples danced cumbia, reggaeton or salsa. Due to personal reasons, Angie Jibaja could not appear in the show, even though the sentence was carried out.

Running order

Couple	Scores	Dance	Music	Result
Jonathan & Alexa	27 (6, 7, 7, 7)	Reggaeton	"Quema Quema"—Aldo y Dandy	Sentenced
Melissa & Ítalo	29 (6, 8, 8, 7)	Salsa	"Con La Misma Moneda"—Josimar y su Yambú	Safe
Christian & Isabel	29 (6, 8, 8, 7)	Cumbia	"No Te Vayas"—Ráfaga	Safe
Fernanda & Sergio	29 (7, 7, 8, 7)	Cumbia	"Apostemos Que Me Caso"—Grupo 5	Safe
Vania & Oreykel	28 (7, 7, 8, 6)	Cumbia	"Bronceado"—Márama	Safe
Aldo & Gabriella	22 (5, 6, 6, 5)	Salsa	"Mi Gente"—Marc Anthony	Sentenced
Anahí & George	33 (9, 7, 9, 8)	Salsa	"Ámame Una Vez Más"—Los 4	Best steps
Emilio & Gabriela	29 (7, 7, 8, 7)	Reggaeton	"Felices los 4"—Maluma	Safe

=== Week 2: Cumbia Night ===
The couples (except those sentenced) danced cumbia.

Due to an injury, Jonathan Maicelo leaves the competition being replaced by César Távara, for this reason the duel was canceled.

Running order

Couple	Scores	Dance	Music	Result
Vania & Oreykel	32 (8, 8, 8, 8)	Cumbia	"Estás Pisao"—Gran Orquesta Internacional	Safe
Christian & Isabel	31 (8, 8, 8, 7)	Cumbia	"No Juegues Con El Diablo"—Bareto	Safe
Aldo & Gabriella	26 (6, 7, 7, 6)	Salsa	"La Gozadera"—Gente de Zona feat. Marc Anthony	Sentenced
Melissa & Ítalo	29 (8, 7, 8, 6)	Cumbia	"Me Gusta"—Tommy Portugal	Sentenced
César & Alexa	35 (9, 9, 9, 8)	Cumbia	"Queremos Bailar"—La Cumbia	Safe
Angie & Horacio	33 (8, 9, 9, 7)	Cumbia	"Loquita"—Márama	Safe
Fernanda & Sergio	34 (8, 8, 10, 8)	Cumbia	"Una Ráfaga de Amor"—Ráfaga	Safe
Emilio & Gabriela	33 (8, 9, 9, 7)	Cumbia	"Noche Loca"—Rombai & Márama	Safe
Anahí & George	37 (9, 9, 10, 9)	Cumbia	"Dos Locos"—Los Villacorta	Best steps

=== Week 3: Bachata & Salsa Night ===
The couples (except those sentenced) danced bachata or salsa.

Due to personal issue, Fernanda Kanno was not present this week's live show, being replaced by so former contestant, Leslie Shaw.

Running order

Couple	Scores	Dance	Music	Result
Christian & Isabel	31 (9, 7, 8, 7)	Salsa	"Timbalero"—El Gran Combo de Puerto Rico	Sentenced
Melissa & Ítalo	31 (7, 8, 9, 7)	Jazz*	"La Descarada"—Reyli	Sentenced
Aldo & Gabriella	21 (5, 6, 5, 5)	Cumbia*	"El Pirulino"—Los Golden Boys	—N/a
César & Alexa	36 (9, 8, 10, 9)	Bachata	"Propuesta Indecente"—Romeo Santos	Safe
Leslie & Sergio	35 (10, 8, 9, 8)	Bachata	"Despacito"—Grupo Extra	Safe
Angie & Horacio	30 (8, 7, 8, 7)	Salsa	"Quimbombó"—Hermanos Moreno	Sentenced
Emilio & Gabriela	32 (9, 7, 8, 8)	Salsa	"Lo Que Tengo Yo"—Los 4 feat. Charanga Habanera	Safe
Anahí & George	33 (9, 8, 9, 7)	Bachata	"Mi Corazoncito"—Aventura	Safe
Vania & Oreykel	37 (10, 9, 10, 8)	Bachata	"Eres Mía"—Romeo Santos	Best steps

The duel*

- Melissa & Ítalo: Safe
- Aldo & Gabriella: Eliminated

=== Week 4: Characterization Night ===
The couples performed a one unlearned dance being characterized to popular music icons.

Running order

Couple	Scores	Dance	Music	Characterization	Result
Fernanda & Sergio	32 (9, 8, 8, 7)	Jazz	"Crazy in Love"—Beyoncé feat. Jay-Z	Beyoncé	Sentenced
Melissa & Ítalo	29 (7, 8, 8, 6)	Jazz*	"Vogue"—Madonna	Madonna	Sentenced
Angie & Horacio	36 (9, 9, 9, 9)	Jazz*	"Let's Get Loud"—Jennifer Lopez	Jennifer Lopez	Safe
Christian & Isabel	35 (8, 9, 9, 8)	Jazz*	"Todos Me Miran"—Gloria Trevi	Gloria Trevi	Safe
Vania & Oreykel	40 (10, 10, 10, 10)	Jazz	"Hips Don't Lie"—Shakira feat. Wyclef Jean	Shakira	Best steps
César & Alexa	33 (8, 8, 8, 9)	Salsa	"Que Cosa Tan Linda"—Oscar D'León	Oscar D'León	Safe
Anahí & George	32 (7, 8, 9, 8)	Jazz	"La Mordidita"—Ricky Martin feat. Yotuel Romero	Ricky Martin	Sentenced
Emilio & Gabriela	33 (9, 8, 8, 8)	Reggaeton	"La Temperatura"—Maluma feat. Eli Palacios	Maluma	Safe

The duel*

- Melissa & Ítalo: Safe
- Angie & Horacio: Eliminated (but safe with the lifeguard)
- Christian & Isabel: Safe

=== Week 5: Past Night ===
The couples performed one unlearned dance to celebrate the past years of their lives.

Running order

Couple	Scores	Dance	Music	Result
César & Alexa	29 (8, 7, 7, 7)	Merengue	"El Baile Del Mono"—Wilfrido Vargas	Sentenced
Fernanda & Sergio	34 (8, 9, 9, 8)	Jazz*	"Mix Tribal Music"—Various Artists	—N/a
Melissa & Ítalo	31 (7, 8, 8, 8)	Bachata*	"Qué Bonito"—Vicky Corbacho	Sentenced
Anahí & George	38 (10, 10, 9, 9)	Tango*	"Cell Block Tango"—from Chicago / "Libertango"—Astor Piazzolla	Best steps
Christian & Isabel	33 (9, 8, 8, 8)	Jazz	"(I've Had) The Time of My Life"—Bill Medley & Jennifer Warnes	Safe
Emilio & Gabriela	34 (9, 9, 8, 8)	Jazz	"We're All in This Together"—from High School Musical	Safe
Angie & Horacio	31 (8, 8, 8, 7)	Lambada	"Chorando Se Foi (Lambada)"—Kaoma	Sentenced
Vania & Oreykel	38 (10, 10, 9, 9)	Reggaeton	"Rica y Apretadita"—El General feat. Anayka	Best steps

The duel*

- Fernanda & Sergio: Eliminated
- Melissa & Ítalo: Safe
- Anahí & George: Eliminated (but safe with the lifeguard)

=== Week 6: Semifinals ===
The couples performed one dance in which they had to sing at the beginning of the performance.

Running order

Couple	Scores	Dance	Music	Result
Angie & Horacio	31 (8, 8, 8, 7)	Jazz*	"Waka Waka (This Time for Africa)"—Shakira	—N/a
César & Alexa	36 (9, 9, 9, 9)	Salsa*	"Mala Mujer"—Zaperoko	Safe
Melissa & Ítalo	31 (8, 8, 8, 7)	Salsa*	"Olvídame y Pega la Vuelta"—Jennifer Lopez feat. Marc Anthony	Sentenced
Anahí & George	41 (11, 11, 10, 9)	Jazz	"All That Jazz"—from Chicago	Best steps
Christian & Isabel	34 (9, 8, 9, 8)	Cumbia	"Una Cerveza"—Ráfaga	Safe
Emilio & Gabriela	34 (9, 8, 9, 8)	Reggaeton	"Reggaetón Lento (Bailemos)"—CNCO	Sentenced
Vania & Oreykel	39 (10, 9, 10, 10)	Cumbia	"Bombón Asesino"—Alma Bella / "Gusano"—Papillón	Safe

The duel*

- Angie & Horacio: Eliminated
- César & Alexa: Eliminated (but safe with the lifeguard)
- Melissa & Ítalo: Safe

=== Week 7: Finals ===
On the first part, the couples danced freestyle.

On the second part, the five finalist couples danced salsa.

On the third part, the three finalists couples danced viennese waltz.

Running order (Part 1)

Couple	Scores	Dance	Music	Result
Melissa & Ítalo	31 (8, 8, 8, 7)	Freestyle	"El Animal"—Gente de Zona/ "Ese Hombre"—Los 4 feat. Los Barraza	Eliminated
Emilio & Gabriela	35 (9, 9, 9, 8)	Freestyle	"Uptown Funk"—Mark Ronson / "Fireball"—Pitbull	Safe
Anahí & George	40 (11, 10, 10, 9)	Freestyle	"Someone like You"—Adele	—N/a
César & Alexa	34 (10, 7, 9, 8)	Freestyle	"Negra Presuntuosa" / "Ritmo, Color y Sabor"—Eva Ayllón	—N/a
Vania & Oreykel	40 (10, 10, 10, 10)	Freestyle	"Quiéreme"—Johnny Sky	—N/a
Christian & Isabel	34 (9, 9, 8, 8)	Freestyle	"Así se Baila el Tango"—Vero Verdier / "Explosive"—David Garrett	—N/a

Running order (Part 2)

Couple	Scores	Dance	Music	Result
César & Alexa	34 (8, 8, 9, 9)	Salsa	"Black or White"—Tony Succar	Safe
Vania & Oreykel	36 (9, 9, 9, 9)	Salsa	"Smooth Criminal"—Tony Succar	Safe
Christian & Isabel	31 (8, 8, 8, 7)	Salsa	"Billie Jean"—Tony Succar	Eliminated
Anahí & George	40 (10, 11, 10, 9)	Salsa	"Thriller"—Tony Succar	Safe
Emilio & Gabriela	31 (8, 8, 8, 7)	Salsa	"I Want You Back"—Tony Succar	Eliminated

Running order (Part 3)

Couple	Scores	Dance	Music	Result
Anahí & George	38 (11, 9, 9, 9)	Viennese waltz	"Un-Break My Heart"—Toni Braxton	Winner
César & Alexa	31 (8, 7, 8, 8)	Viennese waltz	"Sueña"—Luis Miguel	Third place
Vania & Oreykel	37 (10, 9, 9, 9)	Viennese waltz	"Como Yo Nadie Te Ha Amado"—Bon Jovi	Runner-up

== Dance chart ==
The celebrities and professional partners will dance one of these routines for each corresponding week:

- Week 1: Cumbia, reggaeton or salsa (First Dances)
- Week 2: Cumbia (Cumbia Night)
- Week 3: Bachata or salsa (Bachata & Salsa Night)
- Week 4: One unlearned dance (Characterization Night)
- Week 5: One unlearned dance (Past Night)
- Week 6: One dance singing (Semifinals)
- Week 7: Freestyle, salsa & viennese waltz (Final)

Couple	Week 1	Week 2	Week 3	Week 4	Week 5	Week 6	Week 7		
Anahí & George	Salsa	Cumbia	Bachata	Jazz	Tango	Jazz	Freestyle	Salsa	Viennese waltz
Vania & Oreykel	Cumbia	Cumbia	Bachata	Jazz	Reggaeton	Cumbia	Freestyle	Salsa	Viennese waltz
César & Alexa	Reggaeton	Cumbia	Bachata	Salsa	Merengue	Salsa	Freestyle	Salsa	Viennese waltz
Emilio & Gabriela	Reggaeton	Cumbia	Salsa	Reggaeton	Jazz	Reggaeton	Freestyle	Salsa	
Christian & Isabel	Cumbia	Cumbia	Salsa	Jazz	Jazz	Cumbia	Freestyle	Salsa	
Melissa & Ítalo	Salsa	Cumbia	Jazz	Jazz	Bachata	Salsa	Freestyle		
Angie & Horacio	—N/a	Cumbia	Salsa	Jazz	Lambada	Jazz			
Fernanda & Sergio	Cumbia	Cumbia	Bachata	Jazz	Jazz				
Aldo & Gabriella	Salsa	Salsa	Cumbia						

"—" indicates the couple did not dance that week
Highest scoring dance
Lowest scoring dance
In Italic indicate the dance performed in the duel

== Guest judges ==
Date	Guest judge	Occupation(s)
October 14, 2017	Efraín Aguilar	Producer
October 14, 2017	Michelle Alexander	América Televisión producer
October 14, 2017	Joksan Balcázar	Marinera dancer
October 14, 2017	Franco Benza	Producer, choreographer & art director
October 14, 2017	Jimmy Gamonet De Los Heros	Professional dancer & art director
October 14, 2017	Deklan Guzmán	Professional dancer, choreographer & dance director
October 14, 2017	Mávila Huertas	Journalist
October 14, 2017	Martha Muñoz	Afro dancer
October 14, 2017	Ernesto Pimentel	TV Host
October 14, 2017	Ducelia Woll	Professional dancer & choreographer
