= El Gran Show season 25 =

El Gran Show
- Season 25
- Hosted by: Gisela Valcárcel; Aldo Díaz
- Judges: Morella Petrozzi; Adolfo Aguilar; Michelle Alexander; Tilsa Lozano
- No. of episodes: 8

Release
- Original network: América Televisión
- Original release: October 1, 2022 – present

Season twenty-five of El Gran Show premiered on October 1, 2022, on the América Televisión network.

The show returned to its original format after five years of being presented with other versions.

== Cast ==
=== Couples ===
Celebrity	Notability (known for)	Professional partner	Status	Ref.
Manuel Cappillo	América hoy dentist	Alexandra Clavijo	Participating	
Alan "Robotín" Castillo	TV personality	Diana Montalvo	Participating	
Dalia Durán	Model & TV host	Omar El Souky	Participating	
Facundo González	Model & reality TV star	Keyla Bravo	Participating	
Gabriela Herrera	Dancer & reality TV star	Diego Cornejo	Participating	
Samahara Lobatón	Social media personality	Jorge Sánchez	Participating	
Melissa Paredes	Model, actress & TV host	Sergio Álvarez	Participating	
Gino Pesaressi	Model & reality TV star	Alexandra Clavijo	Participating	
Giuliana Rengifo	Cumbia singer	George Neyra	Participating	
Leysi Suárez	Former vedette & actress	Jimy García	Participating	
Santiago Suárez	De vuelta al barrio actor	Marinés Acosta	Participating	
Milena Zárate	Cumbia singer	Jorge Valcárcel	Participating	

=== Host and judges ===
Gisela Valcárcel and Aldo Díaz returned as hosts, while Morella Petrozzi, Tilsa Lozano, Adolfo Aguilar and Michelle Alexander returned as judges.
