= El Gran Show season 14 =

El Gran Show: Reyes del show
- Season 14
- Hosted by: Gisela Valcárcel; Aldo Díaz; Jaime "Choca" Mandros
- Judges: Morella Petrozzi; Pachi Valle Riestra; Carlos Cacho; Alfredo Di Natale
- Celebrity winner: Yahaira Plasencia
- Professional winner: George Neyra
- No. of episodes: 7

Release
- Original network: América Televisión
- Original release: November 7 – December 19, 2015

Season chronology
- ← Previous; Season 13 Next → Season 15

Reyes del Show (English: Show Kings) is the season three of the 2015 edition of El Gran Show premiered on November 7, 2015.

In this season the lifeguard was not used, reason why one of the couples was definitively eliminated in the duel.

On December 19, 2015, singer Yahaira Plasencia and George Neyra were crowned champions, axé star Brenda Carvalho and Pedro Ibáñez finished second, while María Grazia Gamarra and Sergio Álvarez finished third.

== Cast ==
=== Couples ===
The participating couples of this season were conformed by the top four couples of the first and second season. During the first week, it was confirmed that Melissa Loza would not participate due to work problems, so she was replaced by the salsa singer Yahaira Plasencia. At the same time, Sergio Álvarez was replaced by George Neyra.

During the show, two professional partners (Irving Figueroa and Billy Gonzáles) could not continue in competition for different personal issues, being replaced by Pedro Ibáñez and Sergio Álvarez, respectively. Álvarez returned after not participating because of Loza's withdraw.

Celebrity	Notability (known for)	Professional partner	Status
Erick Elera	Al Fondo Hay Sitio actor & singer	Andrea Huapaya	Eliminated 1st on November 21, 2015
Ismael La Rosa	Actor	Michelle Vallejos	Eliminated 2nd on November 28, 2015
Milena Zárate	Singer	Anselmo Pedraza	Eliminated 3rd on December 5, 2015
Alejandro "Zumba" Benitez	Reality TV star	Malory Vargas	Eliminated 4th on December 12, 2015
Franco Cabrera	Actor & comedian	Pierina Neira	Eliminated 5th on December 19, 2015
María Grazia Gamarra	Actress	Sergio Álvarez; Billy Gonzáles (weeks 1-3)	Third place on December 19, 2015
Brenda Carvalho	Axé star	Pedro Ibáñez; Irving Figueroa (week 1)	Runner-up on December 19, 2015
Yahaira Plasencia	Salsa singer	George Neyra	Winners on December 19, 2015

==== Previous seasons ====
Season	Celebrity	Partner	Average	Place
1	Melissa Loza	Sergio Álvarez	35.3	1.º
1	Franco Cabrera	Pierina Neira	35.1	2.º
1	Brenda Carvalho	Irving Figueroa	36.2	3.º
1	María Grazia Gamarra	Billy Gonzáles	32.4	4.º
2	Ismael La Rosa	Michelle Vallejos	33.8	1.º
2	Erick Elera	Andrea Huapaya	33.0	2.º
2	Milena Zárate	Anselmo Pedraza	33.6	3.º
2	Alejandro "Zumba" Benítez	Malory Vargas	34.3	4.º

=== Hosts and judges ===
Gisela Valcárcel, Aldo Díaz and Jaime "Choca" Mandros returned as hosts, while Morella Petrozzi, Carlos Cacho and Pachi Valle Riestra returned as judges. The VIP Jury was not introduced in this season. In Week 2, Alfredo Di Natale, professional dancer and director of the Arthur Murray dance studio, was announced as a new judge in the show.

== Scoring charts ==
Couple	Place	1	2	3	4	5	6	7 (Note: In this week, the dances was not scored because the winner was chosen by the votes of the public.)	
Couple	Place	1	2	3	4	5	6	Top 4	Top 3
Yahaira & George	1	27	35	30	33	38	66	Safe	Winners
Brenda & Pedro	2	26	35	38	37	40	77	Safe	Runner-up
María Grazia & Sergio	3	23	31	34	33	37	67	Safe	Third place
Franco & Pierina	4	22	27	35	34	37	64	Eliminated	
Zumba & Malory	5	24	38	36	34	29	33		
Milena & Anselmo	6	25	34	36	28	36			
Ismael & Michelle	7	25	35	33	36				
Erick & Andrea	8	28	29	30					

Red numbers indicate the sentenced for each week
Green numbers indicate the best steps for each week
the couple was eliminated that week
the couple was safe in the duel
the winning couple
the runner-up couple
the third-place couple

=== Average score chart ===
This table only counts dances scored on a 40-point scale.

Rank by average	Place	Couple	Total points	Number of dances	Average
1	2	Brenda & Pedro	261	7	37.3
2	7	Ismael & Michelle	137	4	34.3
3	5	Zumba & Malory	200	6	33.3
4	1	Yahaira & George	232	7	33.1
5	3	María Grazia & Sergio	231	7	33.0
6	6	Milena & Anselmo	164	5	32.8
7	4	Franco & Pierina	224	7	32.0
7	8	Erick & Andrea	96	3	32.0

=== Highest and lowest scoring performances ===
The best and worst performances in each dance according to the judges' 40-point scale are as follows:

Dance	Highest scored dancer(s)	Highest score	Lowest scored dancer(s)	Lowest score
Latin pop	Milena Zárate	35	María Grazia Gamarra	30
Salsa	Yahaira Plasencia; Alejandro "Zumba" Benitez	36	Franco Cabrera	27
Merengue	Erick Elera	37	Franco Cabrera	29
Hip-ho	Milena Zárate	34	María Grazia Gamarra	31
Cumbia	Ismael La Rosa	35	Erick Elera	29
Reggaeton	Brenda Carvalho	35	Erick Elera	30
Jazz	Brenda Carvalho	37	Franco Cabrera	33
Cha-cha-cha	Brenda Carvalho	37	Milena Zárate	28
Bachata	Yahaira Plasencia	31	—	—
Double dance	Brenda Carvalho	40	Alejandro "Zumba" Benitez	29
Jive	Brenda Carvalho	39	Yahaira Plasencia; Franco Cabrera	31
Dance improvisation	Brenda Carvalho	38	María Grazia Gamarra	32

=== Couples' highest and lowest scoring dances ===
Scores are based upon a potential 40-point maximum.

Couples	Highest scoring dance(s)	Lowest scoring dance(s)
Yahaira & George	Salsa & Rumba flamenca/Lambada (36)	Cumbia (30)
Brenda & Pedro	Contemporary/Quebradita (40)	Salsa & Reggaeton (35)
María Grazia & Sergio	Bollywood/Merengue & Jive (35)	Latin pop (31)
Franco & Pierina	Disco/Reggaeton (37)	Merengue (27)
Zumba & Malory	Salsa & Jazz (36)	Jazz/Festejo (29)
Milena & Anselmo	Latin pop (35)	Cha-cha-cha (28)
Ismael & Michelle	Merengue (36)	Latin pop (2x) (33)
Erick & Andrea	Merengue (37)	Cumbia (29)

== Weekly scores ==
Individual judges' scores in the charts below (given in parentheses) are listed in this order from left to right: Morella Petrozzi, Carlos Cacho, Pachi Valle Riestra, Alfredo Di Natale.

=== Week 1: First Dances ===
Individual judges' scores in the chart below (given in parentheses) are listed in this order from left to right: Morella Petrozzi, Carlos Cacho, Pachi Valle Riestra.

The couples danced the latin pop, merengue or salsa. This week, none couples were sentenced.

Running order

Couple	Scores	Dance	Music	Result
Ismael & Michelle	25 (8, 9, 8)	Latin pop	"Boom Boom"—Chayanne	Safe
María Grazia & Billy	23 (8, 8, 7)	Latin pop	"You'll Be Mine (Party Time)"—Gloria Estefan	Safe
Milena & Anselmo	25 (8, 9, 8)	Salsa	"Aguanile"—Marc Anthony	Safe
Yahaira & George	27 (10, 8, 9)	Salsa	"Magdalena, Mi Amor (Quimbara)"—DLG feat. Ivy Queen	Safe
Brenda & Irving	26 (9, 9, 8)	Salsa	"Abre Que Voy"—Los Van Van	Safe
Franco & Pierina	22 (8, 7, 7)	Merengue	"Una Nalgadita"—Oro Solido	Safe
Erick & Andrea	28 (9, 10, 9)	Merengue	"Mentiroso"—Olga Tañon	Best steps
Zumba & Malory	24 (8, 8, 8)	Latin pop	"Dame Más"—Ricky Martin	Safe

=== Week 2: Versus Night ===
The couples were paired off into four sets, with each set of couples performing the same dance to different songs. In the little train, only the celebrities faced dancing reggaeton.

Running order

Couple	Scores	Dance	Music	Result
Milena & Anselmo	34 (9, 9, 8, 8)	Hip-hop	"Hey Mama"—David Guetta feat. Nicki Minaj, Bebe Rexha & Afrojack	Safe
María Grazia & Billy	31 (8, 7, 8, 8)	Hip-hop	"Papi"—Jennifer Lopez	Safe
Erick & Andrea	29 (8, 7, 7, 7)	Cumbia	"Queremos Bailar"—La Cumbia	Sentenced
Ismael & Michelle	35 (9, 9, 9, 8)	Cumbia	"Luna Luna"—Ráfaga	Safe
Brenda & Pedro	35 (9, 8, 9, 9)	Reggaeton	"Impacto"—Daddy Yankee	Safe
Yahaira & George	33 (8, 8, 9, 8)	Reggaeton	"Culipandeo"—DJ Warner	Safe
Zumba & Malory	36 (9, 10, 9, 8)	Salsa	"La Rumba Buena"—Orquesta La 33	Best steps
Franco & Pierina	27 (7, 6, 7, 7)	Salsa	"Ta Bueno Ya"—Albita Rodríguez	Sentenced

The little train
Participants	Judges' votes	Dance	Music	Winner(s)
Women	Yahaira, Yahaira, Yahaira, Yahaira	Reggaeton	"Mueve el Totó"—Apache Ness & Me Gusta ft. Juan Quin & Dago	Yahaira (2 pts)
Men	Zumba, Zumba, Erick, Zumba	Reggaeton	"Mueve el Totó"—Apache Ness & Me Gusta ft. Juan Quin & Dago	Zumba (2 pts)

=== Week 3: Characterization Night ===
The couples performed one unlearned dance being characterized to popular music icons. In the little train, only the celebrities faced dancing strip dance.

Due to work issues, Yahaira Plasencia could not be present on the set of the show, yet she decided to dance from where she worked, being evaluated by the judges through a video link. Because of this, she was not part of the little train.

Running order

Couple	Scores	Dance	Music	Characterization	Result
Franco & Pierina	33 (9, 8, 8, 8)	Jazz*	"Smooth Criminal"—Michael Jackson	Michael Jackson	Safe
Erick & Andrea	30 (8, 8, 6, 8)	Reggaeton*	"Boriqua Anthem"—El General	El General	—
Zumba & Malory	36 (9, 9, 9, 9)	Jazz	"Single Ladies (Put a Ring on It)"—Beyoncé	Beyoncé	Safe
María Grazia & Billy	34 (9, 8, 9, 8)	Jazz	"You're the One That I Want"—John Travolta & Olivia Newton-John	Olivia Newton-John	Safe
Milena & Anselmo	35 (9, 9, 8, 9)	Latin pop	"Todos Me Miran"—Gloria Trevi	Gloria Trevi	Safe
Yahaira & George	30 (8, 7, 8, 7)	Cumbia	"Techno Cumbia"—Selena	Selena	Sentenced
Brenda & Pedro	37 (10, 9, 9, 9)	Jazz	"Born This Way"—Lady Gaga	Lady Gaga	Best steps
Ismael & Michelle	33 (9, 8, 8, 8)	Latin pop	"Pégate"—Ricky Martin	Ricky Martin	Sentenced

The little train
Participants	Judges' votes	Dance	Music	Winner(s)
Women	Brenda, Milena, Milena, Brenda	Strip dance	"Worth It"—Fifth Harmony feat. Kid Ink	Brenda, Milena (1 pt)
Men	Franco, Ismael, Franco, Franco	Strip dance	"You Can Leave Your Hat On"—Joe Cocker	Franco (2 pts)

=== Week 4: Trio Cha-cha-cha Night ===
The couples (except those sentenced) danced trio cha-cha-cha involving another celebrity. In the little train, the celebrities faced with each other dancing reggaeton.

María Grazia & Sergio were going to dance with actor David Villanueva, but because Villanueva had suffered an injury, choreographer Arturo Chumbe performed in his place.

Running order

Couple (Trio Dance Partner)	Scores	Dance	Music	Result
Milena & Anselmo (Danny Peña)	28 (8, 7, 7, 6)	Cha-cha-cha	"Candela"—Noelia	Sentenced
Franco & Pierina Neira (Tati Alcántara)	34 (9, 9, 8, 8)	Cha-cha-cha	"Corazón Espinado"—Santana & Maná	Safe
Ismael & Michelle	36 (10, 9, 9, 8)	Merengue*	"El Vecino"—Miki González	—
Yahaira & George	31 (9, 7, 7, 8)	Bachata*	"Todo Por Tu Amor"—Xtreme	Sentenced
Brenda & Pedro (Gino Pesaressi)	37 (10, 10, 9, 8)	Cha-cha-cha	"Sway"—The Pussycat Dolls	Best steps
Zumba & Malory (Leslie Shaw)	34 (9, 8, 8, 9)	Cha-cha-cha	"Traigo Una Pena"—Franco De Vita & Víctor Manuelle	Safe
María Grazia & Sergio (Arturo Chumbe)	33 (9, 9, 7, 8)	Cha-cha-cha	"Hush Hush; Hush Hush"—The Pussycat Dolls	Sentenced

The little train
Participants	Judges' votes	Dance	Music	Winner(s)
Celebrities	Yahaira, Yahaira, Zumba, Yahaira	Reggaeton	"Menea Tu Chapa"—Wilo D' New	Yahaira (2 pts)

=== Week 5: Quarterfinals ===
The couples performed a double dance and a team dance, in which only celebrities participated.

Running order

Couple	Scores	Dance	Music	Result
Zumba & Malory	29 (8, 7, 7, 7)	Jazz; Festejo	"Uptown Funk"—Mark Ronson feat. Bruno Mars "Saca las Manos"—Eva Ayllón	Sentenced
Milena & Anselmo	34 (9, 8, 9, 8)	Tango; Cumbia*	"In-tango"—In-Grid "Candela"—Muñecas de la Tele	—
María Grazia & Sergio	35 (9, 9, 9, 8)	Bollywood; Merengue*	"Jai Ho! (You Are My Destiny)"—A. R. Rahman & The Pussycat Dolls "A Pedir Su Mano"—Juan Luis Guerra	Sentenced
Yahaira & George	36 (9, 9, 9, 9)	Rumba flamenca Lambada*	"Bamboléo"—Gipsy Kings "Chorando Se Foi"—Kaoma	Safe
Brenda & Pedro	40 (10, 10, 10, 10)	Contemporary; Quebradita	"Chandelier"—Sia "Qué Bonita"—Banda el Recodo	Best steps
Franco & Pierina	37 (9, 9, 10, 9)	Disco; Reggaeton	"You Should Be Dancing"—Bee Gees "Ella Me Levantó"—Daddy Yankee	Safe
Zumba; Franco; Brenda	0	Jazz (Team A)	"Where Have You Been"—Rihanna	
María Grazia; Yahaira; Milena	2	Jazz (Team B)	"Dare (La La La)"—Shakira	

=== Week 6: Semifinals ===
The couples danced jive and a dance improvisation which involved seven different dance styles, all being rehearsed during the week by the couples and only one being chosen by a draw in the live show. This week, none couples were sentenced.

During the dance improvisation round, Zumba physically assaulted Judge Carlos Cacho, for this reason his dance was not scored and the production decided to eliminate him, automatically saving to Maria Grazia & Sergio.

Running order

Couple	Scores	Dance	Music	Result
Yahaira & George	31 (8, 8, 8, 7)	Jive	"Tequila"—Azúcar Moreno	Safe
Yahaira & George	35 (9, 8, 9, 9)	Salsa	"La Negra Tiene Tumbao"—Celia Cruz	Safe
Franco & Pierina	31 (8, 8, 7, 8)	Jive	"Happy"—Pharrell Williams	Safe
Franco & Pierina	33 (9, 7, 8, 9)	Samba	"Samba do Brasil"—Bellini	Safe
Zumba & Malory	33 (8, 9, 8, 8)	Jive*	"I Got You (I Feel Good)"—James Brown	—
Zumba & Malory	N/A	Marinera	"Pañuelos Al Aire"—Lucy de Mantilla	—
María Grazia & Sergio	35 (9, 8, 9, 9)	Jive*	"Footloose"—Kenny Loggins	Safe
María Grazia & Sergio	32 (8, 8, 8, 8)	Mambo	"Qué Rico el Mambo"—Pérez Prado	Safe
Brenda & Pedro	39 (10, 9, 10, 10)	Jive	"Tainted Love"—Soft Cell	Best steps
Brenda & Pedro	38 (10, 9, 9, 10)	Disco	"Knock on Wood"—Amii Stewart	Best steps

=== Week 7: Finals ===
On the first part, the couples danced freestyle.

On the second part, the final three couples danced viennese waltz and cha-cha-cha or tango.

Running order

Couple	Dance	Music	Result
Brenda & Pedro	Freestyle	"Stand by Me"—Dj Trance / Prince Royce	Safe
Franco & Pierina	Freestyle	"El Sueño de Pochi"—Cecilia Barraza	Eliminated
Yahaira & George	Freestyle	"Te Extraño"—Xtreme / "Lo Que Tengo Yo"—Los 4 feat. La Charanga Habanera	Safe
María Grazia & Sergio	Freestyle	"Voulez-Vous"—ABBA	Safe

Running order (Part 2)

Couple	Dance	Music	Result
María Grazia & Sergio	Viennese waltz	"La Bella y la Bestia"—Manuel Mijares & Rocío Banquells (from Beauty and the Beast)	Third place
María Grazia & Sergio	Tango	"Buttons"—The Pussycat Dolls feat. Snoop Dogg	Third place
Brenda & Pedro	Viennese waltz	"Libre Soy"—Carmen Sarahí (from Frozen)	Runner-up
Brenda & Pedro	Tango	"Sweet Dreams (Are Made of This)"—Eurythmics	Runner-up
Yahaira & George	Viennese waltz	"Un Mundo Ideal"—Ricardo Montaner & Michelle (from Aladdin)	Winners
Yahaira & George	Cha-cha-cha	"Perhaps, Perhaps, Perhaps"—The Pussycat Dolls	Winners

== Dance chart ==
The celebrities and professional partners will dance one of these routines for each corresponding week:

- Week 1: Latin pop, merengue or salsa (First Dances)
- Week 2: One unlearned dance & the little train (Versus Night)
- Week 3: One unlearned dance & the little train (Characterization Night)
- Week 4: Trio cha-cha-cha & the little train (Trio Cha-cha-cha Night)
- Week 5: Double dance & team dance (Quarterfinals)
- Week 6: Jive & dance improvisation (Semifinal)
- Week 7: Freestyle, viennese waltz & cha-cha-cha or tango (Final)

Couple	Week 1	Week 2	Week 3	Week 4	Week 5	Week 6		Week 7		
Yahaira & George	Salsa	Reggaeton (vs. Brenda & Pedro)	Cumbia	Bachata	Rumba flamenca Lambada	Jive	Salsa	Freestyle	Viennese waltz	Cha-cha-cha
Brenda & Pedro	Salsa	Reggaeton (vs. Yahaira & George)	Jazz	Cha-cha-cha	Contemporary; Quebradita	Jive	Disco	Freestyle	Viennese waltz	Tango
María Grazia & Sergio	Latin pop	Hip-hop (vs. Milena & Anselmo)	Jazz	Cha-cha-cha	Bollywood; Merengue	Jive	Mambo	Freestyle	Viennese waltz	Tango
Franco & Pierina	Merengue	Salsa (vs. Zumba & Malory)	Jazz	Cha-cha-cha	Disco; Reggaeton	Jive	Samba	Freestyle		
Zumba & Malory	Latin pop	Salsa (vs. Franco & Pierina)	Jazz	Cha-cha-cha	Jazz; Festejo	Jive	Marinera			
Milena & Anselmo	Salsa	Hip-hop (vs. María Grazia & Sergio)	Latin pop	Cha-cha-cha	Tango; Cumbia					
Ismael & Michelle	Latin pop	Cumbia (vs. Erick & Andrea)	Latin pop	Merengue						
Erick & Andrea	Merengue	Cumbia (vs. Ismael & Michelle)	Reggaeton							

Modalities of competition
Couple	Week 2	Week 3	Week 4	Week 5
Yahaira & George	Reggaeton	Strip dance	Reggaeton	Jazz
Brenda & Pedro	Reggaeton	Strip dance	Reggaeton	Jazz
María Grazia & Sergio	Reggaeton	Strip dance	Reggaeton	Jazz
Franco & Pierina	Reggaeton	Strip dance	Reggaeton	Jazz
Zumba & Malory	Reggaeton	Strip dance	Reggaeton	Jazz
Milena & Anselmo	Reggaeton	Strip dance	Reggaeton	Jazz
Ismael & Michelle	Reggaeton	Strip dance	Reggaeton	
Erick & Andrea	Reggaeton	Strip dance		

Highest scoring dance
Lowest scoring dance
Not scored or danced by the celebrity
Gained bonus points for winning this dance
Gained no bonus points for losing this dance
Danced, but not scored
In Italic indicate the dances performed in the duel
