= Vania Masías Málaga =

Peruvian dancer and choreographer

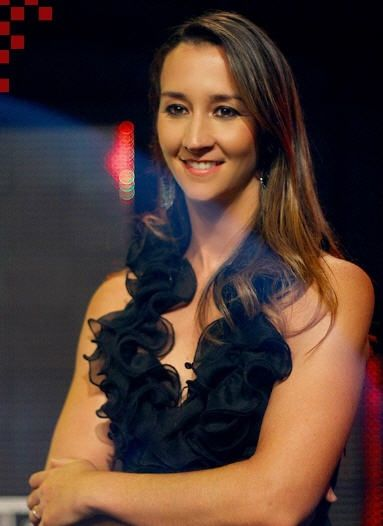
- Born: 3 January 1979 (age 46); Lima, Peru
- Education: Colegio Villa María; Universidad del Pacífico
- Occupation(s): Dancer, choreographer

Vania Masías Málaga (born 3 January 1979) is a Peruvian dancer and choreographer. She is founder and president of the D1 Cultural Association.

== Biography ==
Vania Masías Málaga was born in Lima on 3 January 1979, the daughter of Manuel Masías Marrou and Beatriz Málaga Checa. She is the niece of the former First Lady Clorinda Málaga and the athlete Natalia Málaga.

She attended the Colegio Villa María in Lima. She later graduated from the Faculty of Business Administration at the Universidad del Pacífico, and was an exchange student at Maastricht University in the Netherlands. She studied ballet at Lucy Telge's school in 1987. She participated in the Latin American Children's Ballet Competition on two occasions, winning a silver medal and then a gold. At age 15, she participated in the Prix de Lausanne, an international classical dance festival.

In 1997, Masías began appearing in principal dancer roles with the ballet of the Teatro Municipal de Lima. She later participated in ballets such as Don Quixote, where she was a soloist, and studied in Cuba and at the Boston Ballet. She passed exams at the Royal Academy of Dance, a British school with which Lucy Telge was affiliated. She was hired by the National Ballet of Ireland.

She ventured into contemporary dance with dancer-choreographer Yvonne von Mollendorf, representing Peru at festivals in Germany, Italy, Spain, and Aruba.

In 2005, Masías was selected to join Cirque du Soleil after auditions in London. However, she instead returned to Lima and formed the group Ángeles de Arena with young acrobats there. She founded the D1 Cultural Association the same year.

In early 2006, she was part of the cast of the musical Broadway Nights. In 2007, she staged the musical Mezcla, which was re-released in 2008 as Mezclados, and in 2009 as Más mezclados.

In 2010, she appeared in the play El musical 2010, produced by Denisse Dibós's Preludio Asociación Cultural.

In January 2012, she gave birth to her first child. On 28 and 29 March 2011, her company D1 Dance performed at the Choreographers Festival in New York, at the Manhattan Movement and Arts Center, organized by the R.Evolución Latina collective. The same year, she directed the musical TuLima at the Teatro Peruano Japonés, also with a special performance in the Plaza de Armas of Lima.

In 2012, Masías participated in the choreographic direction of the musical Chicago. That year she also presented the "Pura Calle" International Festival of Urban Cultures in Lima. In 2016, she was the director of choreography for Mamma Mia!

Masías is an ambassador of the Peru Brand, a member of the Ministry of Culture's Advisory Council, and a member of the National Council of Education.

== Theater credits ==
=== Ballet ===
- La Bayadère as Nikiya
- The Nutcracker as Hada Confite
- Swan Lake as Odette/Odile
- Don Quixote as Kitri
- Romeo and Juliet as Juliet
- Snow White and the Seven Dwarfs as Madrastra
- La fille mal gardée as Lisa
- Le Corsaire as Medora

=== Director of choreography ===
- Mezcla (2007)
- Mezclados (2008)
- Más mezclados (2009)
- TuLima (2011)
- Mamma Mia! (2016)
- Opening of the Pan American Games (2019)

=== General creative director ===
- Musical Blanca Nieves (2015)
- Musical Cenicienta (2016)
- Musical Sirena (2018)
- Opening of the 8th Summit of the Americas (2018)

=== Productions with D1 ===
- Orígenes Virú (2017): London, Arequipa, Trujillo tour
- Imagina Perú (2018): London tour
