= Axé Bahia =

Brazilian Eurodance group

- Origin: Brazil
- Genres: Axé • Eurodance
- Years active: 2002-present
- Members: Flaviana Seeling; Bruno Zaretti; Francini Amaral
- Past members: Jefferson Barbosa (1975-2016); Jociney Barbosa; Giselle Salardi; Brenda Carvalho; Meire Carvalho; Melissa de Souza; Cleverson Ribeiro

Axé Bahia is a six-member Eurodance/axé music group from Brazil, who achieved fame in South America with their single "Beijo na Boca", particularly the Spanish-language version, "Beso en la Boca".

Axé Bahia began its quest for fame in the late 1990s. Based in Brazil, the group was originally made up of Flaviana Seeling, Jeferson Fabiano Barbosa, Jociney Barbosa, Thalyta, Amanda, and Rodrigo. The group, headed by Flaviana Seeling, was discovered by a Chilean businessman who saw some of its members dancing at a resort.

The group headed to Chile to test their luck and take their shot at fame in 2001. Shortly after arriving in Chile, three of the group's members, Thalyta, Amanda, and Rodrigo, decided to head back to Brazil. The group in Chile decided to search for two more members and found Francini Contin do Amaral and Bruno Alexandre Lazzaretti. Flaviana Seeling, Jeferson Fabiano Barbosa, Jociney Barbosa, Francini Contin do Amaral, and Bruno Alexandre Lazzaretti are the five members that have performed the majority of the group's songs and dances, and is the group best known as Axé Bahia. When Flaviana Seeling got pregnant in 2003, the group added a sixth member, Brenda Carvalho, who replaced Seeling during her pregnancy. Afterward, Brenda Carvalho started her own group, Exporto Brasil. Axé Bahia, throughout its ongoing change in membership, has worked in Brazil, Chile, El Salvador (Canal 6), Mexico City and Peru, to name a few places. The group had to learn Spanish to be able to record outside of Brazil. This paid off, and they sold thousands of copies of their two albums throughout Latin America.

The membership of Axé Bahia, changed again in 2006, moving back to a sextet. The current members are Flaviana Seeling, Jeferson Fabiano Barbosa, Jociney Barbosa, and new members, Cleverson Leandro Ribeiro, Meire Guimaraes de Carvalho, and Gisele Salardi. In 2006, Axé Bahia, along with adding three new members, created Axé Bahia Company, a dance school. Axé Bahia is most famous for its songs "Beijo Na Boca" (Spanish: "Beso en la Boca"), and "Tudo Bem".

"H Bahía" is a spin-off group from Axé Bahía.

On April 22, 2016, cofounder Jeferson Fabiano Barbosa died at age 40, after falling from the 15th floor of an apartment building in Santiago de Chile.

== Discography ==
- 2002: Tudo bem
1. "Namorar Pelado (Beijo Na Boca)" - 3:29
2. "Tesouro Do Pirata (Onda Onda)" - 2:46
3. "Dança Da Manivela" - 4:00
4. "Tudo Bem” - 3:41
5. “ Maomeno
6. "Tekila “
7. " Tapinha
8. “"Tchu Tchuca"
9. “Sempre Quer Me Bater “
10. “Gingado De Mola (Mostra)”
11. “Amo Voce"
12. “Beso en La Boca “ (Namorar Pelado Namorar PeladoVersion En Español)
- 2002: Tudo bem 2, o ritmo continua
1. "Danca Do Esquisito"
2. "Pitbul"
3. "Maomeno"
4. "Amo Voce"
5. “Tapinha”
6. “Flaviana”
7. "Danca Do Vampiro"
8. "Molinho Molinho “
9. "Raimunda"
10. "Que Calor, Que Calor “
11. "Essa E Nova Moda"
12. "A Moda Do Oriente"
13. "Pra Ficar Dez"
14. "Sempre Quer Me Bater"
- 2003: Vuelve la onda del verano
1. "Namorar Pelado"
2. "Danca Da Manivela"
3. "Vuelve La Onda"
4. "Tesouro Do Pirata"
5. "La Batidora"
6. "Tudo Bem"
7. "Ali Baba"
8. "Maomeno"
9. "Que Calor Que Calor"
10. "Tchu Tchuca"
11. "Danca Do Toureiro"
12. "Banho de Yemanja"
13. "Nego Maluco"
14. "Beso en La Boca"
- 2005: Positivo
1. "Aerosamba" - 0:44
2. "Es O No Es (Da ou Desce)" - 3:40
3. "No Estoy Ni Ahi (To Nem Ai)" - 3:28
4. "Pusha Pusha" - 3:39
5. "La Cucarachiña (Dona Baratinha)" - 3:51
6. "Mama Yo Quiero (Mamae Eu Quero)" - 3:09
7. "Peloton (Pelotao Da Xuxa)" - 4:08
8. "Sacudiendo a Yaca" - 3:36
9. "Filete" - 3:21
10. "Mueve La Pompa" - 4:00
11. "Clima de Rodeo (Clima de Rodeio)" - 3:58
12. "El Baile de Las Manitas (Danca Da Maozinha)" - 3:33
13. "No Estoy Ni Ahi (To Nem Ai)" - 4:38
- 2008 Melhores Sucessos
1. Danca Do Esquisito
2. Yo Quiero Bailar
3. Vuelve La Onda
4. Tesouro Do Pirata (Remix)
5. Tekila
6. Tudo Bem (Remix)
7. Tudo Bem
8. Molinho Molinho
9. Raimunda
10. Beso En La Boca
11. Essa E A Nova Moda
12. Tapinha
13. Onda Onda
14. Namora Pelado
15. Namora Pelado (Remix)
16. Positivo Drink
17. Danca Da Manivela (Remix)
18. Gingado De Mola
19. Pitbull
20. La Cucarachiña
- 2014 Fiesta Mundial Ecuador 2014
1. Dimelo
2. Mueve La Pompa
3. Jugaste Con Mi Amor
4. Llondando un Cariño
5. Homenaje
6. No Es Fácil Perdonar
7. El Cabanal
8. Danca Do Tchan (En Vivo)
9. La Terecumbia
10. Que Ciego Fui
11. Bailando Cuarare
12. Así No Mamasita
13. Donde Está El Amor
14. Fresh Open Bar (En Vivo)
15. Bla Bla Bla (En Vivo)
- 2016 Dance History 2.0
1. Around The World
2. Captain Jack
3. Kernkraft 400
4. Beso En La Boca (Remix)
5. Something Goin On
6. Will I (Extendex Mix)
7. Push The Feeling On
8. Professional Widow
9. Everytime You Need Me ( Featuring Maria Rubia)
10. Fly On The Wings Of Love 2011

== Tours ==
- 20 Años Tour (2023)

Date (2023)	City	Country	Venue
May 6	San Miguel	Peru	Arena 1
May 7	San Miguel	Peru	Arena 1
May 12	La Paz	Bolivia	Teatro al aire Libre
September 16	Arequipa	Peru	Jardín de la Cerveza
September 23	Trujillo	Peru	Club Trujillo
September 24	Lima	Peru	Plaza Norte
