= Orquesta La 33 =

Columbian salsa band

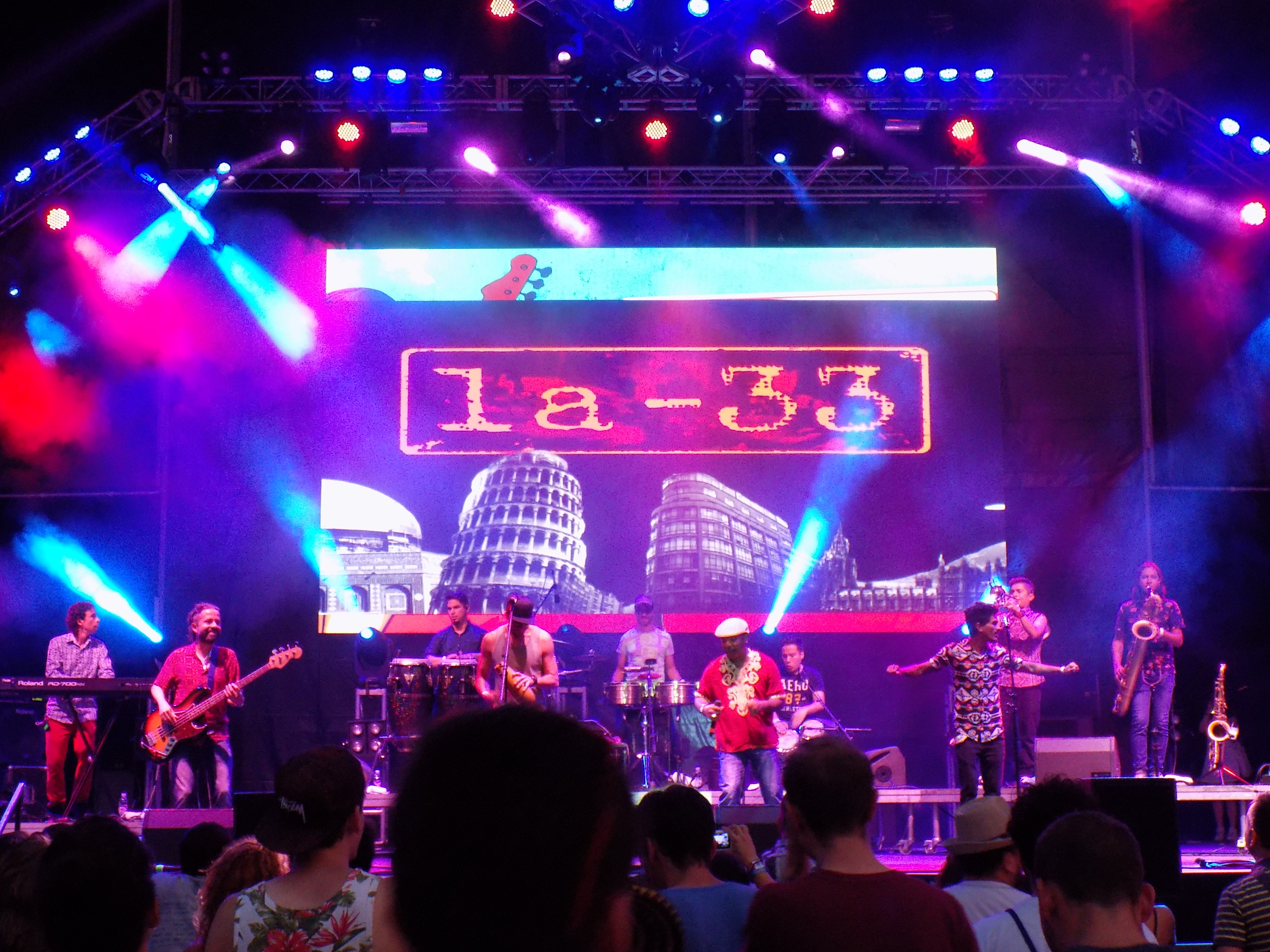
- La-33, Sziget Festival, Budapest

Background information
- Also known as: La-33
- Origin: Bogotá, Colombia
- Genres: Salsa music
- Years active: 2001–present
- Members: See text
- Website: www.la-33.com

Orquesta La 33 (commonly La-33) is a Colombian salsa music band. The collective was founded in Bogotá in 2001 by brothers Sergio and Santiago Mejía. The name is taken from the city's Calle 33, in Teusaquillo, the 13th locality of Bogotá, where the band first rehearsed.

== Description ==
The band interprets a salsa dura style music with influences of mambo, jazz and pasodoble. The members of the band saved money from performances in bars in Bogotá to release their first album in 2004. La-33 has performed at many international venues, among others at the popular Sziget Festival in Budapest. In 2016, the band released their fifth album, celebrating 15 years of activity; Caliente. The album contains a cover, of Fire, Jimi Hendrix. In the same year, a song by La-33 was featured on the chosen third best album of 2016, by fellow Colombian band Systema Solar; La Plata. Also in 2016, the group performed at a festival in Villavicencio.

== Members ==
- Sergio Mejía (bandleader and electric bass)
- Santiago Mejía (keyboards)
- Guillermo Celis (vocals)
- David Cantillo "Malpelo" (vocals)
- Edison Velasquez (vocals) (Flute)
- Alejandro Perez (conga)
- Juan David Fernández "Palo" (timbales)
- Diego Sánchez (bongos)
- Vladimir Romero (trombone)
- José Miguel Vega (trombone)
- Adalber Gaviria (tenor saxophone and baritone saxophone)
- Roland Nieto (trumpet)
- Javier Galavis (sound engineer)
- Ray Fuquén (field producer)

== Discography ==
=== La 33 (2004) ===
- 1. (Gózala Con) La 33, selected extracts which introduce the group members
- 2. Soledad, "Solitude"
- 3. Anny's Boogaloo
- 4. La Pantera Mambo, uses The Pink Panther Theme
- 5. Que Rico Boogaloo, "What a delicious boogaloo"
- 6. Suelta el Bongó, "Drop the bongo"
- 7. La Película, "The Movie"
- 8. La Vida Se Pasa a Mil, "Life goes on"
- 9. El Tornillo de Guillo, "The screws of Guillo"
- 10. Manuela

=== Gózalo (2007) ===
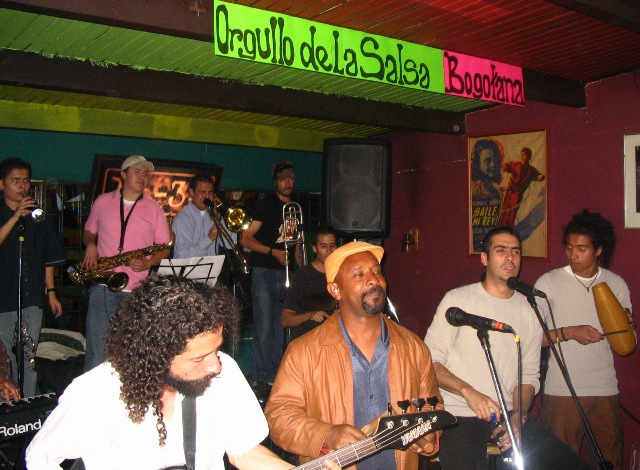
Orquesta La 33 playing in 2007

- 1 Descarga 33
- 2. Bye-Bye, references to Pedro Navaja
- 3. Quiéreme Na' Ma'', "Love me, that's all"
- 4. Plinio Guzmán (reprise Lucho Bermúdez)
- 5. La Fea, "The Ugly"
- 6. El Robo "Theft"
- 7. Te lo Voy a Devolver "I'll make it"
- 8. Gózalo "Enjoy it!"
- 9. Bomba Colombiana "Colombian Bomba"
- 10. Porque Yo "Because I ..."
- 11. Rumba Buena "Good party"
- 12. El Turpial
- 13. La Tormenta, "The Storm" (Resume Sandstorm Charlie Palmieri)
- 14. Arrullo y Son, "Arrullo and Son(g)"
- 15. My Favorite Things, instrumental cover

Vocals: a new singer, Pablo Andrés Martínez

=== Ten Cuidado (2009) ===
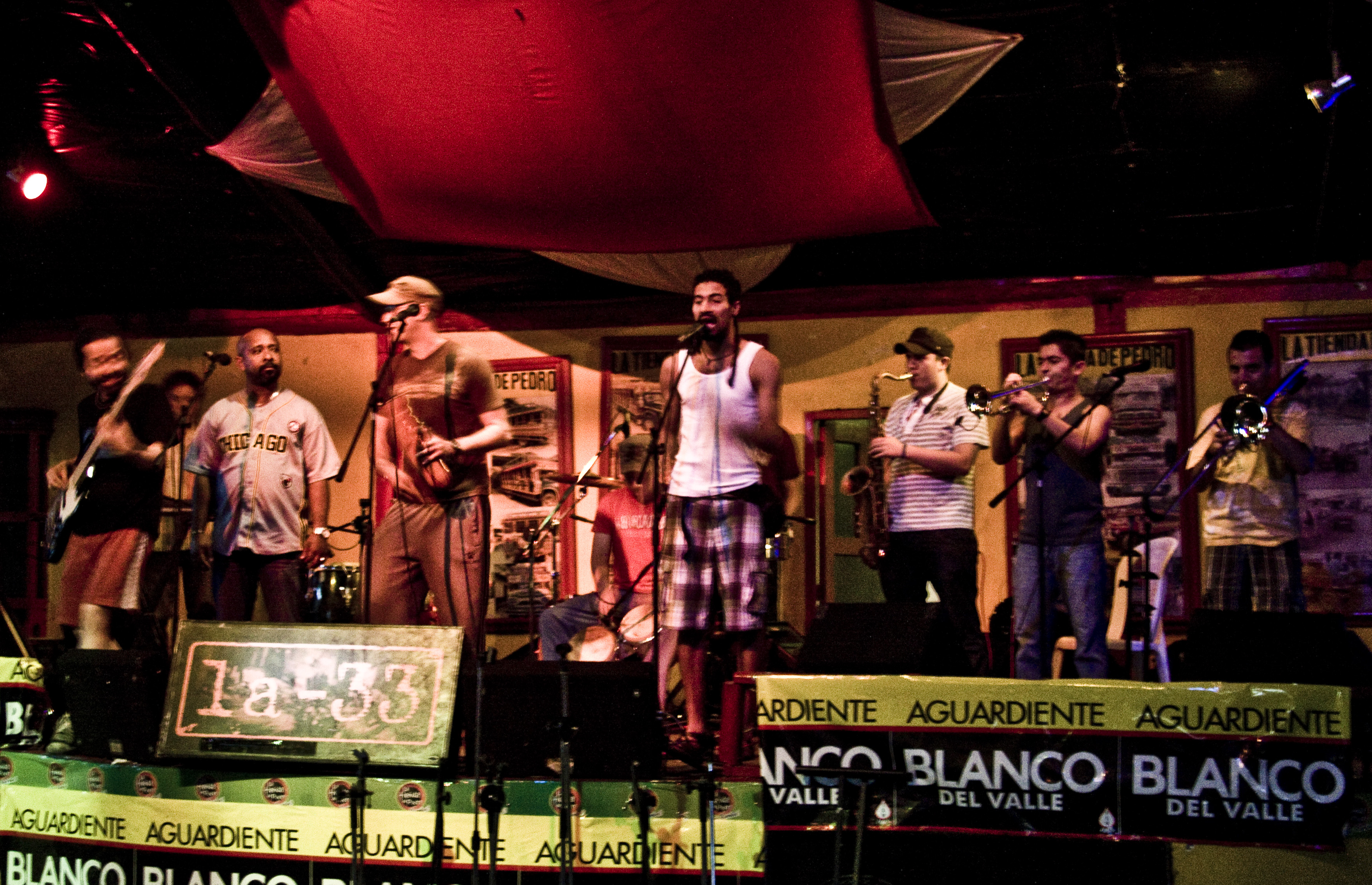
La-33, Feria de Cali, 2010

- 1. Ten Cuidado, "Be careful"
- 2. Conciencia Intranquila
- 3. Me Quedo
- 4. Funky Boogaloo
- 5. Sombra y Desgracia
- 6. La Salsa Resucitó
- 7. Cartagena
- 8. Sonrisas Bellas
- 9. Roxanne (cover of Roxanne)
- 10. Vanidad
- 11. Mambo Con Boogaloo, "Mambo with Boogaloo"

=== Tumbando Por Ahí (2013) ===
- 1. Cuero
- 2. Patacón Con Queso
- 3. Ya No Me Amas
- 4. Óyele
- 5. La Reina del Swing
- 6. Tumbando Por Ahí
- 7. Casanova
- 8. Guayabo, "Hangover"
- 9. Sonero de Tabogo
- 10. Tumbadora
- 11. Silencio
- 12. Shooting Mambo
- 13. Mambo Colombia
