= Ráfaga =

Argentine band

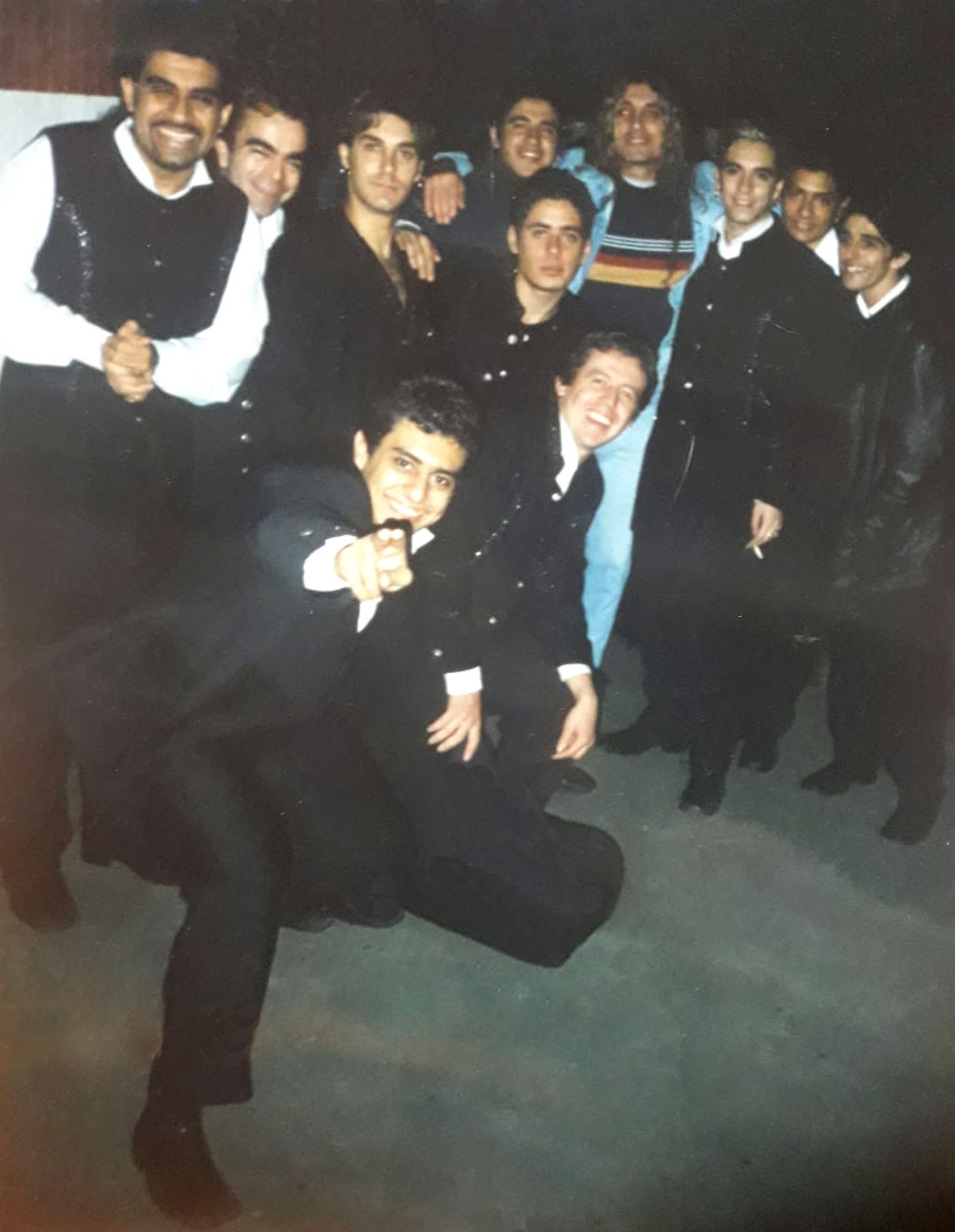
- Last concert of Ráfaga with its original musicians (winter 2002 in Isidro Casanova)

Background information
- Origin: Argentina
- Genres: Argentine cumbia
- Years active: 1994-present
- Members: Ariel Puchetta; Raúl "Richard" Rosales; Mauricio "Maury" Juárez; Juan Carlos "Coco" Fusco; Marcelo "Pollo" Rodríguez; Omar Morel; Ulises Piñeyro; Damián "Moroco" Morel
- Website: www.gruporafaga.com.ar

Ráfaga is a band in the Argentine cumbia. Formed in 1994, in Parque Chacabuco, they started playing in Argentine cumbia clubs and quickly gained popularity.

The band is characterised by medieval outfits and jewelry.

In 1997 and 1998 they participated in the Midem Latino de Musica in Miami, which gave them an international reputation, taking their music to other countries such as Chile, Uruguay, Paraguay, Bolivia, Peru, and even to Spain at the end of 1999. In 2001 they went on a North American tour to Canada, then to New York, Washington and Miami.

They continued touring, with concerts in other countries such as Romania (where "La luna y tú" was used for a commercial), Sweden, Norway, Switzerland, China and Australia.

== Band members ==
- Ariel Puchetta (vocals)
- Raúl "Richard" Rosales (guitar)
- Mauricio "Maury" Juárez (keyboards/background vocals)
- Juan Carlos "Coco" Fusco (bass)
- Marcelo "Pollo" Rodríguez (percussion)
- Omar Morel (drums)
- Ulises Piñeyro (percussion/rap)
- Damián "Moroco" Morel (keyboards)

== Old members ==
- Rodrigo Tapari (2003 - 2017)
- Sergio Aranda (1994 - 2008)
- Mauro Piñeyro (1994 - 2017), who is currently Ráfaga's manager

== Discography ==
- Soplando fuerte (1996)
- Sobrevolando América (1997)
- Imparables (1998)
- Ráfaga en vivo desde el Estadio Chile (1999) (live in Chile Stadium)
- Un Fenómeno Natural (2000)
- Otra Dimensión (2001)
- Marca Registrada (2002)
- Lo Mejor de Ráfaga (2003)
- Vuela (2004)
- Dueños del Viento (2006)
- Señales (2009)
- Historia 1 (2011)
- Una cerveza (2016)
- El regreso

== Important tours ==
- Viña del Mar (2000)
- European Tour (2000)
- Luna Park Nights (2001)
- Cultura Para Todos (2001)
- Viña del Mar (2001)
- Tour Ráfaga, el regreso (2018)

== Awards ==
- Over a million albums and singles sold
- Gold album in Sweden, Switzerland and Romania
- Double Platinum Disc in Spain
- 7 albums edited in 22 countries
- 4 European tours
- 4 tours in USA and Canada
- Midem Latino Revelation 1996/1997
- 2 Gaviotas de Oro, Viña del Mar Festival
- 4 Gardel awards for Best Tropical Band (2000, 2001, 2002, 2003)
