= Karen Dejo =

Peruvian actress and dancer

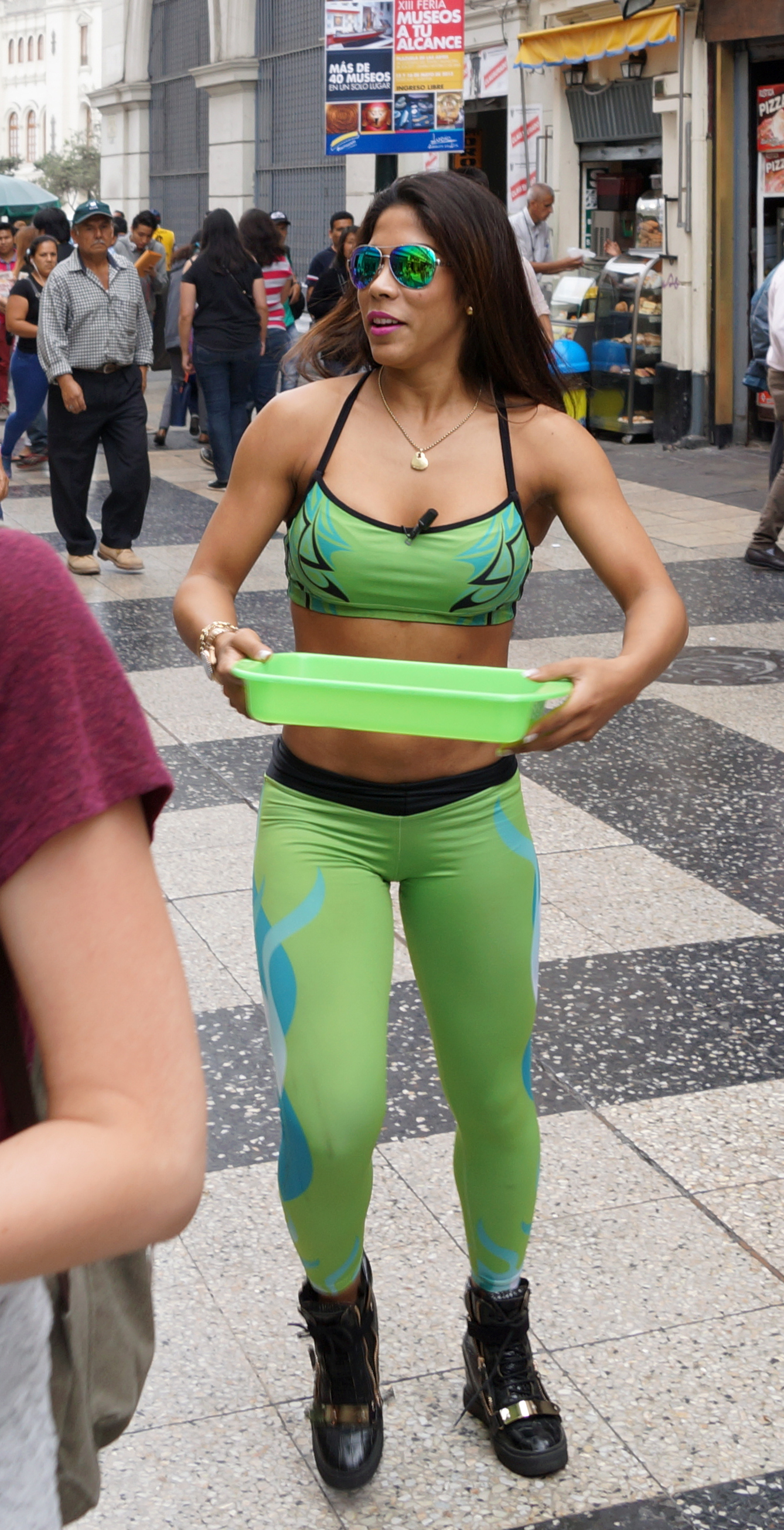
- Born: Karen Ivonne Dejo Yglesias; 10 July 1980 (age 45); Callao, Perú
- Occupation(s): dancer, actress, TV hostess
- Years active: 1999–present
- Height: 160 cm (5 ft 3 in)

Karen Dejo (born 10 July 1980) is a Peruvian actress and dancer. She has appeared in numerous Latin American television presentations.

Dejo started her career as a model, and later performed as a ballerina in the TV Show La Movida de los Sabados with Jeanet Barboza.

After this she joined the band Alma Bella, which was followed by her appearance in the video-spot "Jugo de Tamarindo" with Julio Andrade. She subsequently performed in the internationally broadcast telenovela Besos robados in 2004.

Dejo has appeared in roles in Chicha tu madre and Talk Show. She has also appeared in theater, and has worked in a circus.

She had a role as Paola in the erotic TV series Bellas y Ambiciosas in 2006 with Raúl Olivo. In 2012 she was the winner of the dance reality series El Gran Show.

== Career ==
At the age of 15 she started appearing on the show La movida de los sábados as a dancer. After that she joined the female cumbia group Alma Bella as a dancer.

In 2002, she was the hostess with Lizet Soto in the program Ritmo de los sábados. She worked on the comedy show Risas de América, which was renamed Rargados de la la laura years later. 2004, Dejo starred in the video of the musical theme "Jugo de tamarindo" by the singer Julio Andrade. She also participated in the soap opera Besos robados.

In 2006 she acted in the erotic series Bellas y Ambiciosas produced by Venevisión playing a character named Paola.; then she participated in the Peruvian films Talk Show and Chicha tu madre.

In 2008, after her departure from the comedy show she was working on, she conducted the cumbia show Sábados Tropicales. The program was cancelled due to low ratings.

Dejo competed in the reality dance and singing show El show de los sueños: amigos del alma hosted by Gisela Valcárcel, where he came in seventh place after three months of competition. Dejo competed in the reality dance show El gran show hosted by Gisela Valcárcel, where she won second place after three months of competition. Thanks to her second place she qualified for the third season called El gran show: reyes del show, where she got the fourth place.

In 2010 along with Michel Robles, she competed in the second season of Amigos y Rivales KR 2 reality show. In 2011 she participated in Vidas Extreme: Peruvian talent, ATV reality show.
