= Tilsa Lozano =

Peruvian model (born 1982)

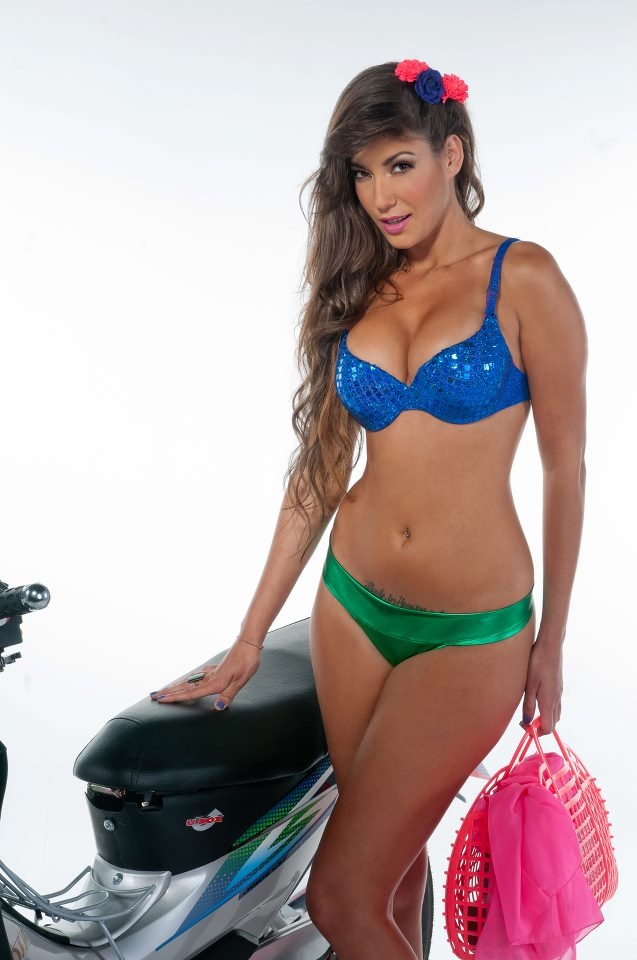
- Tilsa Lozano in a photoshoot
- Born: Tilsa Marcela Lozano Sibila; October 31, 1982 (age 43); Lima, Peru
- Occupations: Model, Playboy TV actress
- Modeling information
- Height: 1.73 m (5 ft 8 in)
- Website: http://www.tilsa-lozano.com

Tilsa Marcela Lozano Sibila (born October 31, 1982) is a Peruvian model. Tilsa is also a Playboy TV actress for Latin America & Iberia.

== Life and Career ==
She has posed for magazines such as Maxim, SoHo, Cosas Hombre and Caras. She has also worked with designers such as Claudia Bertolero, Fabrizio Célleri, Jennifer Nicholson, Ana María Guiulfo and Stika Semsch.

She acted in the series Surfing Attraction, Bunny World and Seduction Weapons for Playboy.

== Titles ==
- Miss Hawaiian Tropic Perú (2006)
- Miss Reef Perú (2007)
- Miss Reef International (2008)
- Miss Playboy TV Latinoamérica & Iberia (2008)

== Selected filmography ==
| Year | Title | Role | Notes |
|---|---|---|---|
| 2006 | Habacilar | Model | Show for teenagers |
| 2008 | Surfing Attraction | Uma | Lead role, Playboy TV |
| 2009 | El Show de los sueños | Herself | Guest star, June 13 episode |
| 2009 | Bunny World | Herself | Playboy TV |
| 2009 | Fuego cruzado: Vidas extremas | Herself | 1 episode |
| 2010 | Seduction Weapons | Jackie | Playboy TV |
| 2010 | Seduction Weapons 2 | Jackie | Playboy TV |
| 2010 | El Gran Show | Herself/Contestant | Replaced |
