= El Gran Show season 9 =

El Gran Show
- Season 9
- Hosted by: Gisela Valcárcel; Aldo Díaz; Francisco "Paco" Bazán; Gachi Rivero
- Judges: Morella Petrozzi; Pachi Valle Riestra; Carlos Cacho; Phillip Butters
- Celebrity winner: Emilia Drago
- Professional winner: Sergio Lois
- No. of episodes: 13

Release
- Original network: América Televisión
- Original release: May 18 – August 10, 2013

Season chronology
- ← Previous; Season 8 Next → Season 10

Season one of the 2013 edition of El Gran Show premiered on May 18, 2013.

Since Week 4, like last season, the procedure in the duel was the same, the sentenced couple that gets the highest score is the save, with the difference that the votes of the public would award 2 extra points, in addition the judges' scores were secret, being only shown the vote of the judge that couples choose. The modality of coaches also continued, with choreographers Arturo Chumbe and César "Chechi" Yáñez.

On August 10, 2013, actress Emilia Drago and Sergio Lois were declared the winners, journalist and TV host Víctor Hugo Dávila and Lindathay Valero finished second, while model and TV host Claudia Portocarrero and Joel Velázquez were third.

== Cast ==
=== Couples ===
On May 10, 2013 celebrities were presented at a press conference, one of them was one of the show producers, Jaime "Choca" Mandros (being, after Denny Valdeiglesias in the second season of 2011, the second production member to participate). The professional dancers were presented in the first week, among them returned Jacqueline Alfaro, Angelo Cano, Emanuel Colombo and Sergio Lois. Arturo Chumbe and César "Chechi" Yáñez were the coaches.

Due to an injury, model Edith Tapia had to withdraw from the competition before it started. Even so, it was announced that she would be part of the cast of next season.

Celebrity	Notability (known for)	Professional partner	Status	Ref.
William Luna	Andean music singer-songwriter	Diana Murga	Eliminated 1st on June 1, 2013	
Joshua Ivanoff	Model	Yamila Molina	Eliminated 2nd on June 15, 2013	
Lucía Oxenford	Model & actress	Emanuel Colombo	Eliminated 3rd on June 22, 2013	
Alfonso "Puchungo" Yáñez	Former football player	Vania Carbone	Eliminated 4th on July 6, 2013	
Mariella Zanetti	Former vedette & actress	Angelo Cano	Eliminated 5th on July 13, 2013	
André Silva	Actor	Nazareth García	Eliminated 6th on July 20, 2013	
Jaime "Choca" Mandros	Producer & journalist	Jacqueline Alfaro	Eliminated 7th on July 27, 2013	
Josetty Hurtado	Actress	Juan Tamayo	Eliminated 8th on August 3, 2013	
Yamila Piñero	Model	Gustavo Rivera; Bruce Tejada (weeks 1-8)	Eliminated 9th on August 10, 2013	
Claudia Portocarrero	Model & TV host	Joel Velázquez	Third place on August 10, 2013	
Víctor Hugo Dávila	Journalist and TV host	Lindathay Valero	Runner-up on August 10, 2013	
Emilia Drago	Actress & model	Sergio Lois	Winners on August 10, 2013	

Teams
Coach	Couples		
Arturo Chumbe	Victor Hugo & Lindathay	Emilia & Sergio	Josetty & Juan
Arturo Chumbe	William & Diana	André & Nazareth	Mariella & Angelo
César "Chechi" Yáñez	Joshua & Yamila	Choca & Jacqueline	Lucía & Emanuel
César "Chechi" Yáñez	Yamila & Gustavo	Claudia & Joel	Puchungo & Vania

=== Host and judges ===
Gisela Valcárcel and Aldo Díaz returned as hosts, while Paco Bazán replaced Óscar López Arias as co-host. In addition, the actress Gachi Rivero worked as a reporter for the show. Morella Petrozzi, Carlos Cacho, Pachi Valle Riestra and the VIP Jury returned as judges while Rosanna Lignarolo did not return. From the third week, journalist Phillip Butters joined the panel as the fourth judge to replace Lignarolo.

== Scoring charts ==
Couple	Place	1	2	3	4	5	6	7	8	9	10	11	12	13	
Couple	Place	1	2	3	4	5	6	7	8	9	10	11	12	Top 4	Top 2
Emilia & Sergio	1	34	36	44	44	50	48	50	46	45	49	91	98	94	+47=141
Víctor Hugo & Lindathay	2	33	31	44	41	43	44	45	43	40	49	88	89	89	+45=134
Claudia & Joel	3	32	34	47	47	44	41	46	41	48	42	90	85	87	
Yamila & Gustavo	4	32	36	39	41	42	48	41	43	45	47	92	91	89	
Josetty & Juan	5	28	32	42	43	49	46	46	42	40	48	85	85		
Choca & Jacqueline	6	37	33	42	47	43	39	45	41	44	42	82			
André & Nazareth	7	30	31	38	38	46	39	40	44	38	37				
Mariella & Angelo	8	29	32	38	41	43	42	42	41	38					
Puchungo & Vania	9	28	28	38	37	40	42	36	38						
Lucía & Emanuel	10	32	33	41	42	37	39								
Joshua & Yamila	11	29	32	36	38	40									
William & Diana	12	26	25	32											

Red numbers indicate the sentenced for each week
Green numbers indicate the best steps for each week
the couple was eliminated that week
the couple was safe in the duel
the couple was eliminated that week and safe with a lifeguard
the winning couple
the runner-up couple
the third-place couple

=== Average score chart ===
This table only counts dances scored on a 40-point scale (the VIP jury scores since Week 3 are excluded).

Rank by average	Place	Couple	Total points	Number of dances	Average
1	1	Emilia & Sergio	620	17	36.5
2	4	Yamila & Gustavo	543	16	33.9
3	3	Claudia & Joel	537	16	33.6
4	5	Josetty & Juan	465	14	33.2
5	2	Víctor Hugo & Lindathay	561	17	33.0
6	6	Choca & Jacqueline	387	12	32.3
7	10	Lucía & Emanuel	187	6	31.2
8	8	Mariella & Angelo	273	9	30.3
9	7	André & Nazareth	298	10	29.8
10	11	Joshua & Yamila	145	5	29.0
11	9	Puchungo & Vania	223	8	27.9
12	12	William & Diana	74	3	24.7

=== Highest and lowest scoring performances ===
The best and worst performances in each dance according to the judges' 40-point scale (the VIP jury scores since Week 3 are excluded) are as follows:

Dance	Highest scored dancer(s)	Highest score	Lowest scored dancer(s)	Lowest score
Salsa	Emilia Drago	40	Alfonso "Puchungo" Yáñez	28
Disco	Emilia Drago	36	William Luna	26
Reggaeton	Yamila Piñero	36	Joshua Ivanoff; Lucía Oxenford	29
Cumbia	Claudia Portocarrero; Emilia Drago	38	William Luna	25
Latin pop	Emilia Drago	34	Josetty Hurtado; Mariella Zanetti	28
Pachanga	Claudia Portocarrero	34	Alfonso "Puchungo" Yáñez	28
Merengue	Lucía Oxenford	32	Mariella Zanetti	29
Festejo	Alfonso "Puchungo" Yáñez	28	William Luna	23
Jazz	Claudia Portocarrero	37	Joshua Ivanoff	26
Lambada	Jaime "Choca" Mandros	32	—	—
World dances	Yamila Piñero; Emilia Drago	37	Jaime "Choca" Mandros	29
Mambo	Mariella Zanetti	32	André Silva	27
Jive	Josetty Hurtado	36	Jaime "Choca" Mandros; Claudia Portocarrero	31
Rumba	Yamila Piñero	31	—	—
Samba	Claudia Portocarrero	34	Jaime "Choca" Mandros	33
Tango	Emilia Drago	40	Mariella Zanetti	31
Paso doble	Víctor Hugo Dávila	33	Alfonso "Puchungo" Yáñez	26
Fusion dance	Yamila Piñero; Emilia Drago	35	Víctor Hugo Dávila; André Silva	28
Adagio	Yamila Piñero	37	Jaime "Choca" Mandros	29
Quebradita	Emilia Drago	37	Claudia Portocarrero	31
Freestyle	Emilia Drago	37	Claudia Portocarrero	33
Quickstep	Emilia Drago	37	Víctor Hugo Dávila	35

=== Couples' highest and lowest scoring dances ===
Scores are based upon a potential 40-point maximum (the VIP jury scores since Week 3 are excluded).

Couples	Highest scoring dance(s)	Lowest scoring dance(s)
Emilia & Sergio	Tango & Salsa (40)	Cumbia, Latin pop, Jazz & Adagio (34)
Víctor Hugo & Lindathay	Cumbia (36)	Quickstep/Tango fusion (28)
Claudia & Joel	Cumbia (38)	Cumbia (30)
Yamila & Gustavo	Belly dance, Adagio & Salsa (37)	Salsa (30)
Josetty & Juan	Salsa (38)	Latin pop (28)
Choca & Jacqueline	Salsa (37)	Can-can & Adagio (29)
André & Nazareth	Salsa & Jazz (32)	Mambo (27)
Mariella & Angelo	Salsa, Mambo & Jive (32)	Latin pop (28)
Puchungo & Vania	Merengue (30)	Salsa (26)
Lucía & Emanuel	Pachanga (33)	Salsa & Reggaeton (29)
Joshua & Yamila	Latin pop (32)	Jazz (26)
William & Diana	Disco (26)	Festejo (23)

== Weekly scores ==
Individual judges' scores in the charts below (given in parentheses) are listed in this order from left to right: Morella Petrozzi, Carlos Cacho, Pachi Valle Riestra, VIP Jury.

=== Week 1: First Dances ===
The couples danced cumbia, disco, latin pop, pachanga, reggaeton or salsa. This week, none couples were sentenced.

Running order

Couple	Scores	Dance	Music	Result
Puchungo & Vania	28 (7, 6, 6, 9)	Salsa	"Las Cajas"—Joe Arroyo	Safe
Claudia & Joel	32 (8, 7, 7, 10)	Salsa	"Ven Morena"—Oscar D'León	Safe
William & Diana	26 (6, 6, 6, 8)	Disco	"You Should Be Dancing"—Bee Gees	Safe
Lucía & Emanuel	32 (7, 8, 7, 10)	Reggaeton	"Limbo"—Daddy Yankee	Safe
Choca & Jacqueline	37 (10, 9, 8, 10)	Salsa	"Mi gente"—Marc Anthony	Best steps
Joshua & Yamila	29 (7, 6, 6, 10)	Reggaeton	"Quema, Quema"—Aldo & Dandy	Safe
Mariella & Angelo	29 (7, 7, 6, 9)	Cumbia	"La Escobita" / "Canalla"—Marisol y La Magia del Norte	Safe
Emilia & Sergio	34 (9, 7, 8, 10)	Cumbia	"La Caderona"—Los Villacorta	Safe
Yamila & Bruce	32 (8, 7, 7, 10)	Latin pop	"Rabiosa"—Shakira	Safe
André & Nazareth	30 (8, 6, 7, 9)	Pachanga	"Bara Bará Bere Berê"—Michel Teló	Safe
Josetty & Juan	28 (6, 7, 7, 8)	Latin pop	"Mujer Latina" / "Arrasando"—Thalía	Safe
Víctor Hugo & Lindathay	33 (9, 7, 7, 10)	Latin pop	"Boom, Boom" / "Baila, Baila" / "Provócame"—Chayanne	Safe

=== Week 2: Party Night ===
The couples performed one unlearned dance.

Running order

Couple	Scores	Dance	Music	Result
Claudia & Joel	34 (8, 8, 8, 10)	Cumbia	"Agonía de Amor"—Dilbert Aguilar y La Tribu	Safe
André & Nazareth	31 (7, 8, 7, 9)	Salsa	"Muévete" / "Juana Magdalena"—La Charanga Habanera	Safe
Puchungo & Vania	28 (7, 6, 7, 8)	Cumbia	"El Arbolito"—Grupo Néctar	Sentenced
Choca & Jacqueline	33 (8, 8, 7, 10)	Pachanga	"Danza Kuduro"—Don Omar feat. Lucenzo	Safe
Emilia & Sergio	36 (9, 9, 8, 10)	Disco	"Last Dance"—Donna Summer	Best steps
Josetty & Juan	32 (8, 8, 8, 8)	Cumbia	"La Ricotona"—Armonía 10	Safe
Joshua & Yamila	32 (7, 8, 7, 10)	Latin pop	"Pégate"—Ricky Martin	Safe
Lucía & Emanuel	33 (8, 8, 7, 10)	Pachanga	"Envidia" / "El Ombligo"—Las Culisueltas	Safe
Mariella & Angelo	32 (7, 8, 7, 10)	Salsa	"En Barranquilla Me Quedo"—Joe Arroyo	Safe
Víctor Hugo & Lindathay	31 (7, 7, 7, 10)	Reggaeton	"Mayor Que Yo" / "Noche de Entierro (Nuestro Amor)"—Luny Tunes	Safe
William & Diana	25 (6, 7, 5, 7)	Cumbia	"Lárgate"—Hermanos Yaipén	Sentenced
Yamila & Bruce	36 (9, 9, 8, 10)	Reggaeton	"El Ritmo No Perdona (Prende)"—Daddy Yankee	Best steps

=== Week 3: The '80s Night ===
Individual judges' scores in the charts below (given in parentheses) are listed in this order from left to right: Morella Petrozzi, Carlos Cacho, Phillip Butters, Pachi Valle Riestra, VIP Jury.

The couples (except those sentenced) performed one unlearned dance to famous '80s songs.

Running order

Couple	Scores	Dance	Music	Result
Mariella & Angelo	38 (7, 7, 8, 7, 9)	Merengue	"El Negro No Puede"—Las Chicas del Can	Sentenced
Víctor Hugo & Lindathay	44 (8, 8, 9, 9, 10)	Salsa	"La Fiesta de Pilito"—El Gran Combo de Puerto Rico	Safe
André & Nazareth	38 (7, 7, 8, 7, 9)	Latin pop	"Súbete a Mi Moto"—Menudo	Sentenced
Yamila & Bruce	39 (8, 7, 8, 7, 9)	Salsa	"Timbalero"—El Gran Combo de Puerto Rico	Safe
William & Diana	32 (6, 5, 6, 6, 9)	Festejo*	"El Guaranguito"—Lucila Campos	—N/a
Puchungo & Vania	38 (7, 7, 7, 7, 10)	Festejo*	"Se Me Van los Pies"—Susana Baca	Sentenced
Josetty & Juan	42 (8, 9, 7, 9, 9)	Jazz	"¿A Quién Le Importa?"—Alaska y Dinarama	Safe
Joshua & Yamila	36 (7, 5, 7, 7, 10)	Jazz	"Beat It"—Michael Jackson	Safe
Lucía & Emanuel	41 (8, 8, 9, 7, 9)	Merengue	"Abusadora"—Wilfrido Vargas	Safe
Claudia & Joel	47 (10, 9, 9, 9, 10)	Jazz	"I Love Rock 'N Roll"—Joan Jett & the Blackhearts	Best steps
Choca & Jacqueline	42 (8, 8, 9, 7, 10)	Lambada	"Chorando Se Foi (Lambada)"—Kaoma	Safe
Emilia & Sergio	44 (9, 8, 10, 7, 10)	Latin pop	"Fiesta En América"—Chayanne	Safe

*The duel

- William & Diana: Eliminated
- Puchungo & Vania: Safe

=== Week 4: Cumbia & Jazz Night ===
The couples (except those sentenced) danced cumbia or jazz and a danceathon of cumbia.

Running order

Couple	Scores	Dance	Music	Result
Josetty & Juan	43 (8, 9, 9, 8, 9)	Jazz	"Single Ladies (Put a Ring on It)"—Beyoncé	Safe
Víctor Hugo & Lindathay	41 (8, 7, 9, 8, 9)	Cumbia	"Cariñito"—Los Hijos del Sol	Safe
Lucía & Emanuel	42 (8, 8, 8, 8, 10)	Jazz	"Dirrty"—Christina Aguilera feat. Redman	Safe
Joshua & Yamila	38 (7, 8, 6, 7, 10)	Cumbia	"El Siqui Siqui"—Euforia	Sentenced
Mariella & Angelo	39 (8, 7, 8, 6, 10)	Latin pop*	"You'll Be Mine (Party Time)"—Gloria Estefan	Safe
André & Nazareth	38 (8, 6, 7, 7, 10)	Jazz*	"We Found Love"—Rihanna feat. Calvin Harris	Sentenced
Puchungo & Vania	37 (6, 7, 8, 6, 10)	Pachanga*	"El Malo"—Aventura / "Las Muchachas"—Alquimia la Sonora del XXI	Sentenced
Choca & Jacqueline	45 (9, 9, 8, 9, 10)	Cumbia	"Viento"—Chacalón	Best steps
Emilia & Sergio	44 (9, 8, 9, 8, 10)	Jazz	"Me Against the Music"—Britney Spears feat. Madonna	Safe
Claudia & Joel	47 (10, 9, 10, 8, 10)	Cumbia	"El Tao Tao"—Grupo 5	Best steps
Yamila & Bruce	41 (8, 7, 9, 8, 9)	Jazz	"Telephone"—Lady Gaga feat. Beyoncé	Safe
Victor Hugo & Lindathay; Emilia & Sergio; Josetty & Juan; Joshua & Yamila; Choca & Jacqueline; Lucía & Emanuel; Yamila & Gustavo; Claudia & Joel; André & Nazareth; Puchungo & Vania; Mariella & Angelo	2	Cumbia (The danceathon)	"Motor y Motivo" / "Te Vas" / "El Ritmo de Mi Corazón"—Grupo 5	

*The duel

- Mariella & Angelo: Safe (2pts)
- André & Nazareth: Safe
- Puchungo & Vania: Eliminated (but safe with the lifeguard)

=== Week 5: Pachanga & Salsa Night ===
The couples (except those sentenced) danced pachanga or salsa and a team dance of k-pop.

Running order

Couple	Scores	Dance	Music	Result
Yamila & Bruce	42 (9, 7, 9, 7, 10)	Pachanga	"Inténtalo (Me Prende)"—3Ball MTY feat. El Bebeto & América Sierra	Safe
Choca & Jacqueline	43 (9, 8, 8, 8, 10)	Salsa	"Un Verano en Nueva York"—El Gran Combo de Puerto Rico	Safe
Víctor Hugo & Lindathay	41 (8, 8, 7, 8, 10)	Pachanga	"Balada Boa"—Gusttavo Lima	Safe
Emilia & Sergio	48 (10, 9, 10, 9, 10)	Salsa	"Princesita"—Oscar D'Leon	Best steps
Joshua & Yamila	40 (7, 8, 8, 7, 10)	Jazz*	"Dur dur d'être bébé!"—Jordy Lemoine / "Party Rock Anthem"—LMFAO	—N/a
André & Nazareth	42 (7, 9, 8, 8, 10)	Salsa*	"Temba, Tumba, Timba"—Los Van Van	Safe
Puchungo & Vania	40 (7, 7, 9, 7, 10)	Merengue*	"Es Mentiroso" / "Muchacho Malo"—Olga Tañon	Sentenced
Mariella & Angelo	41 (8, 8, 8, 7, 10)	Pachanga	"La Cumbia Tribalera"—El Pelon del Mikrophone	Safe
Lucía & Emanuel	37 (7, 7, 8, 7, 8)	Salsa	"Talento de TV"—Willie Colón	Sentenced
Claudia & Joel	44 (9, 8, 9, 8, 10)	Pachanga	"El Teke Teke"—Crazy Design & Carlitos Wey	Safe
Josetty & Juan	47 (9, 10, 9, 9, 10)	Salsa	"El Serrucho" / "Fuma el Barco"—The Latin Brothers	Safe
Víctor Hugo & Lindathay; Emilia & Sergio; Josetty & Juan; André & Nazareth; Mariella & Angelo	2	K-pop (Team "Chumbe")	"Mr. Simple"—Super Junior "Gentleman"—Psy	
Joshua & Yamila; Choca & Jacqueline; Lucía & Emanuel; Yamila & Gustavo; Claudia & Joel; Puchungo & Vania	0	K-pop (Team "Chechi")	"Fantastic Baby"—Big Bang "Gangnam Style"—Psy	

*The duel

- Joshua & Yamila: Eliminated
- André & Nazareth: Safe (2pts)
- Puchungo & Vania: Safe

=== Week 6: World Dances Night ===
The couples (except those sentenced) performed the world dances and a team dance of hula.

Running order

Couple	Scores	Dance	Music	Result
André & Nazareth	38 (8, 8, 7, 7, 8)	(United States) Country	"Cotton Eye Joe"—Rednex	Sentenced
Claudia & Joel	40 (8, 8, 8, 7, 9)	(Dominican Republic) Bachata	"Llévame Contigo"—Romeo Santos	Safe
Mariella & Angelo	41 (8, 9, 7, 8, 9)	(Cuba) Mambo	"Mambo No.8"—Pérez Prado	Safe
Yamila & Bruce	47 (9, 9, 10, 9, 10)	(Saudi Arabia) Belly dance	"Sidi Mansour"—Saber Rebaï	Best steps
Lucía & Emanuel	38 (7, 7, 7, 8, 9)	Reggaeton*	"Sexy Movimiento"—Wisin & Yandel / "Impacto"—Daddy Yankee	—N/a
Puchungo & Vania	39 (7, 7, 7, 8, 10)	Jazz*	"Footloose"—Kenny Loggins	Safe
Choca & Jacqueline	38 (7, 7, 7, 8, 9)	(France) Can-can	"Galop Infernal"—Vanessa-Mae	Sentenced
Emilia & Sergio	47 (10, 10, 8, 9, 10)	(Spain) Rumba flamenca	"Baila Me"—Gipsy Kings	Best steps
Josetty & Juan	45 (9, 9, 9, 9, 9)	(India) Bollywood	"Ishq Kamina"—Alka Yagnik & Sonu Niigaam	Safe
Víctor Hugo & Lindathay	43 (8, 8, 8, 9, 10)	(Peru) Huaylarsh	"Papi"—Sonia Morales	Safe
Víctor Hugo & Lindathay; Emilia & Sergio; Josetty & Juan; André & Nazareth; Mariella & Angelo	1	Hula (Team "Chumbe")	"I Command You"—Burning Flames	
Choca & Jacqueline; Lucía & Emanuel; Yamila & Gustavo; Claudia & Joel; Puchungo & Vania	1	Hula (Team "Chechi")	"Bush Dancer"—Burning Flames	

*The duel

- Lucía & Emanuel: Eliminated
- Puchungo & Vania: Safe (2pts)

=== Week 7: Movie Night ===
The couples (except those sentenced) performed one unlearned ballroom dance to famous film songs. In the versus, the couples faced dancing different dance styles.

Running order

Couple	Scores	Dance	Music	Result
Josetty & Juan	46 (8, 10, 9, 9, 10)	Jive	"You're the One That I Want"—from Grease	Safe
Yamila & Bruce	41 (8, 7, 8, 8, 10)	Rumba	"I Don't Want to Miss a Thing"—from Armageddon	Safe
Claudia & Joel	44 (9, 9, 9, 7, 10)	Samba	"Star Wars Theme/Cantina Band"—from Star Wars	Safe
Mariella & Angelo	40 (7, 9, 7, 8, 9)	Tango	"Theme from Mission: Impossible"—from Mission: Impossible	Safe
Emilia & Sergio	50 (10, 10, 10, 10, 10)	Tango	"Brucia La Terra"—from The Godfather	Best steps
André & Nazareth	40 (8, 8, 7, 8, 9)	Latin pop*	"Soy Sexy y Lo Sabes"—Ricky Martin	Sentenced
Choca & Jacqueline	43 (8, 9, 8, 8, 10)	Samba*	"Real in Rio" / "Magalenha"—Sérgio Mendes	Safe
Puchungo & Vania	36 (6, 8, 6, 7, 9)	Paso doble	"Superman Theme"—from Superman	Sentenced
Víctor Hugo & Lindathay	43 (9, 9, 7, 8, 10)	Paso doble	"Gonna Fly Now"—from Rocky	Safe

The versus
Couple	Judges' votes	Dance	Music	Result
Mariella & Angelo	Mariella, André, Puchungo, Mariella	Reggaeton	"Ella Se Arrebata"—Dj Pablito	Winners (2pts)
André & Nazareth	Mariella, André, Puchungo, Mariella	Reggaeton	"Na de Na"—Angel y Khriz	Losers
Puchungo & Vania	Mariella, André, Puchungo, Mariella	Reggaeton	"Veo Veo"—Guajiros	Losers
Víctor Hugo & Lindathay	Víctor Hugo, Josetty, Choca, Víctor Hugo	Latin pop	"Si Tu Boquita Fuera"—Pitbull	Winners (2pts)
Choca & Jacqueline	Víctor Hugo, Josetty, Choca, Víctor Hugo	Latin pop	"Lo Que No Sabes Tú"—Chino & Nacho	Losers
Josetty & Juan	Víctor Hugo, Josetty, Choca, Víctor Hugo	Latin pop	"Candela"—Noelia	Losers
Claudia & Joel	Claudia, Claudia, Emilia, Claudia	Merengue	"Una Nalgadita"—Oro Solido	Winners (2pts)
Emilia & Sergio	Claudia, Claudia, Emilia, Claudia	Merengue	"El Tiki Tiki"—Oro Duro	Losers
Yamila & Bruce	Claudia, Claudia, Emilia, Claudia	Merengue	"La Cosquillita"—Juan Luis Guerra	Losers

*The duel

- André & Nazareth: Eliminated (but safe with the lifeguard)
- Choca & Jacqueline: Safe (2pts)

=== Week 8: Latin Rock Night ===
The couples (except those sentenced) danced jive with latin rock music. In the versus, the couples faced dancing disco.

Running order

Couple	Scores	Dance	Music	Result
Víctor Hugo & Lindathay	41 (9, 8, 8, 7, 9)	Jive	"Venezia"—Hombres G	Safe
Yamila & Bruce	42 (8, 8, 8, 8, 10)	Jive	"Marta Tiene un Marcapasos"—Hombres G	Safe
Mariella & Angelo	41 (8, 9, 8, 7, 9)	Jive	"Caperucita Feroz"—Orquesta Mondragón	Sentenced
André & Nazareth	42 (7, 8, 8, 9, 10)	Jazz*	"4 Minutes"—Madonna feat. Justin Timberlake y Timbaland	Safe
Puchungo & Vania	36 (6, 7, 7, 6, 10)	Salsa*	"La Miradera"—La Charanga Habanera	—N/a
Emilia & Sergio	45 (9, 9, 9, 8, 10)	Jive	"Sexo"—Los Prisioneros	Best steps
Josetty & Juan	42 (8, 8, 9, 7, 10)	Jive	"Lola"—Miki González	Safe
Choca & Jacqueline	41 (7, 9, 7, 8, 10)	Jive	"Cuando la Cama Me Da Vueltas"—Arena Hash	Sentenced
Claudia & Joel	41 (8, 7, 8, 8, 10)	Jive	"Los Globos del Cielo"—Pedro Suárez-Vértiz	Sentenced

The versus
Couple	Judges' votes	Dance	Music	Result
André & Nazareth	André, Mariella, André, André	Disco	"Born to Be Alive"—Patrick Hernandez	Winnes (2 pts)
Puchungo & Vania	André, Mariella, André, André	Disco	"September"—Earth, Wind & Fire	Losers
Mariella & Angelo	André, Mariella, André, André	Disco	"Gloria"—Laura Branigan	Losers
Víctor Hugo & Lindathay	Víctor Hugo, Josetty, Choca, Víctor Hugo	Disco	"Don't Stop 'Til You Get Enough"—Michael Jackson	Winnes (2 pts)
Choca & Jacqueline	Víctor Hugo, Josetty, Choca, Víctor Hugo	Disco	"Knock On Wood"—Amii Stewart	Losers
Josetty & Juan	Víctor Hugo, Josetty, Choca, Víctor Hugo	Disco	"I Will Survive"—Gloria Gaynor	Losers
Emilia & Sergio	Emilia, Emilia, Yamila, Yamila	Disco	"Turn the Beat Around"—Gloria Estefan	Tie (1 pt)
Yamila & Bruce	Emilia, Emilia, Yamila, Yamila	Disco	"Boogie Wonderland"—Earth, Wind & Fire	Tie (1 pt)
Claudia & Joel	Emilia, Emilia, Yamila, Yamila	Disco	"Copacabana"—Barry Manilow	Losers

*The duel

- André & Nazareth: Safe
- Puchungo & Vania: Eliminated (2pts)

=== Week 9: Glam Metal Night ===
The couples (except those sentenced) danced a fusion dance that fused two dance styles with glam metal music. In the little train, the participants faced dancing strip dance.

Running order

Couple	Scores	Dance	Music	Result
Josetty & Juan	38 (6, 8, 7, 8, 9)	Paso doble Samba	"Welcome to the Jungle"—Guns N' Roses	Sentenced
Víctor Hugo & Lindathay	38 (7, 7, 7, 7, 10)	Quickstep; Tango	"Jump"—Van Halen	Sentenced
Yamila & Gustavo	45 (9, 9, 8, 9, 10)	Quickstep; Cha-cha-cha	"We're Not Gonna Take It"—Twisted Sister	Safe
Emilia & Sergio	45 (9, 8, 9, 9, 10)	Viennese waltz Cha-cha-cha	"I Was Made for Lovin' You"—Kiss	Safe
Choca & Jacqueline	42 (8, 8, 8, 8, 10)	Reggaeton*	"Ahora Es"—Wisin & Yandel	Safe
Mariella & Angelo	38 (7, 7, 7, 7, 10)	Latin pop*	"Let's Get Loud"—Jennifer Lopez	—N/a
Claudia & Joel	48 (10, 9, 10, 9, 10)	Cumbia*	"Sacude el Billete"—Dilbert Aguilar y La Tribu "Sangre Caliente"—Euforia	Best steps
André & Nazareth	38 (7, 8, 6, 7, 10)	Waltz; Tango	"Sweet Child o' Mine"—Guns N' Roses	Sentenced

The little train
Participants	Judges' votes	Dance	Music	Winner(s)
Women	Lindathay, Lindathay, Claudia, Lindathay	Strip dance	"S&M"—Rihanna feat. Britney Spears	Lindathay (2 pts)
Men	Juan, Gustavo, Juan, Joel	Strip dance	"I'm Too Sexy"—Right Said Fred	Juan (2 pts)

*The duel

- Choca & Jacqueline: Eliminated (but safe with the lifeguard) (2pts)
- Mariella & Angelo: Eliminated
- Claudia & Joel: Safe

=== Week 10: Cumbia Night ===
The couples (except those sentenced) danced cumbia. In the versus, the couples faced dancing adagio.

Running order

Couple	Scores	Dance	Music	Result
Claudia & Joel	40 (8, 7, 8, 7, 10)	Cumbia	"Lárgate"—Hermanos Yaipén	Sentenced
Emilia & Sergio	48 (10, 9, 10, 9, 10)	Cumbia	"Te Vas"—Grupo 5	Best steps
Josetty & Juan	48 (9, 10, 10, 9, 10)	Salsa*	"Margarita"—Wilkins	Safe
Víctor Hugo & Lindathay	45 (10, 8, 9, 8, 10)	Jazz*	"Jailhouse Rock"—Elvis Presley	Best steps
André & Nazareth	37 (7, 6, 7, 7, 10)	Mambo*	"Mambo No. 5 (A Little Bit Of...)"—Lou Bega	—N/a
Yamila & Gustavo	46 (10, 8, 9, 9, 10)	Cumbia	"Motor y Motivo"—Grupo 5	Safe
Choca & Jacqueline	42 (8, 8, 8, 8, 10)	Cumbia	"Hasta las 6 de la Mañana"—Armonía 10	Sentenced

The versus
Couple	Judges' votes	Dance	Music	Result
Emilia & Sergio	Emilia, Emilia, Yamila, Yamila	Adagio	"Cuando Se Acaba el Amor"—Guillermo Dávila	Tie (1 pt)
Yamila & Gustavo	Emilia, Emilia, Yamila, Yamila	Adagio	"Para Dormir Contigo"—Aranza	Tie (1 pt)
Claudia & Joel	Claudia, Claudia, Claudia, Claudia	Adagio	"Abrázame Muy Fuerte"—Juan Gabriel	Winners (2 pts)
Choca & Jacqueline	Claudia, Claudia, Claudia, Claudia	Adagio	"Amor en Silencio"—Marco Antonio Solis	Losers
Víctor Hugo & Lindathay	Víctor Hugo, Josetty, Víctor Hugo, André	Adagio	"María Mercedes"—Thalía	Winners (2 pts)
Josetty & Juan	Víctor Hugo, Josetty, Víctor Hugo, André	Adagio	"María la del Barrio"—Thalía	Losers
André & Nazareth	Víctor Hugo, Josetty, Víctor Hugo, André	Adagio	"Marimar"—Thalía	Losers

*The duel

- Josetty & Juan: Safe
- Víctor Hugo & Lindathay: Safe (2pts)
- André & Nazareth: Eliminated

=== Week 11: Quarterfinals ===
The couples danced cumbia (except those sentenced), adagio and a danceathon of festejo.

Running order

Couple	Scores	Dance	Music	Result
Yamila & Gustavo	45 (9, 9, 9, 8, 10)	Cumbia	"No Juegues con el Diablo"—Bareto	Bes teps
Yamila & Gustavo	47 (10, 9, 9, 9, 10)	Adagio	"La Descarada"—Reyli Barba	Bes teps
Emilia & Sergio	47 (9, 9, 10, 9, 10)	Cumbia	"Pa' Todos Hay"—Bareto	Safe
Emilia & Sergio	44 (9, 8, 8, 9, 10)	Adagio	"Carmín"—Roxana Valdivieso	Safe
Choca & Jacqueline	41 (8, 7, 8, 8, 10)	Pachanga*	"Pa' los Coquitos"—La Coco Band	—N/a
Choca & Jacqueline	39 (7, 8, 7, 7, 10)	Adagio	"La Usurpadora"—Pandora	—N/a
Claudia & Joel	44 (9, 8, 9, 8, 10)	Jazz*	"The Way I Are"—Timbaland feat. D.O.E & Keri Hilson	Safe
Claudia & Joel	44 (9, 9, 8, 8, 10)	Adagio	"Se Dice de Mí"—Yolanda Rayo	Safe
Josetty & Juan	43 (8, 9, 9, 7, 10)	Cumbia	"Cariñito"—Bareto	Sentenced
Josetty & Juan	42 (7, 10, 7, 7, 10)	Adagio	"Quinceañera"—Timbiriche	Sentenced
Víctor Hugo & Lindathay	46 (9, 9, 9, 9, 10)	Cumbia	"Ya Se Ha Muerto Mi Abuelo"—Bareto	Sentenced
Víctor Hugo & Lindathay	42 (8, 8, 8, 8, 10)	Adagio	"Un Querer Como el Tuyo"—Ilan Chester	Sentenced
Victor Hugo & Lindathay; Emilia & Sergio; Josetty & Juan; Choca & Jacqueline; Yamila & Gustavo; Claudia & Joel	2	Festejo (The danceathon)	"Ritmo, Color y Sabor"—Eva Ayllón	

*The duel

- Choca & Jacqueline: Eliminated (2pts)
- Claudia & Joel: Safe

=== Week 12: Semifinals ===
The couples danced quebradita (except those sentenced) and trio salsa involving another celebrity. In the little train, the participants faced dancing strip dance. This week, none couples were sentenced.

Running order

Couple (Trio Dance Partner)	Scores	Dance	Music	Result
Emilia & Sergio (Belén Estévez)	47 (10, 9, 10, 8, 10)	Quebradita	"El Sonidito"—Hechizeros Band	Best steps
Emilia & Sergio (Belén Estévez)	50 (10, 10, 10, 10, 10)	Salsa	"Quimbara"—Celia Cruz & Johnny Pacheco	Best steps
Claudia & Joel (Katherine Mendoza)	41 (8, 8, 8, 7, 10)	Quebradita	"Bátelo Morena"—Banda Cuisillos	Safe
Claudia & Joel (Katherine Mendoza)	43 (8, 9, 8, 8, 10)	Salsa	"La Rebelión"—Joe Arroyo	Safe
Yamila & Gustavo (Karen Dejo)	42 (9, 8, 8, 7, 10)	Quebradita	"La Quebradora"—Banda el Recodo	Safe
Yamila & Gustavo (Karen Dejo)	47 (9, 9, 10, 9, 10)	Salsa	"La Malanga"—Eddie Palmieri	Safe
Josetty & Juan (Micheille Soifer)	43 (8, 8, 9, 8, 10)	Reggaeton*	"Quitate Tu Pa Ponerme Yo"—Eddie Dee	—N/a
Josetty & Juan (Micheille Soifer)	42 (7, 8, 9, 8, 10)	Salsa	"Ven Morena"—Oscar D'León	—N/a
Víctor Hugo & Lindathay (Miguel "Conejo" Rebosio)	43 (8, 8, 8, 9, 10)	Pachanga*	"Tacata'"—Tacabro	Safe
Víctor Hugo & Lindathay (Miguel "Conejo" Rebosio)	44 (8, 9, 9, 8, 10)	Salsa	"Que Se Sepa"—Roberto Roena	Safe

The little train
Participants	Judges' votes	Dance	Music	Winner(s)
Women	Yamila, Claudia, Claudia, Yamila	Strip dance	"Man! I Feel Like a Woman!"—Shania Twain	Claudia, Yamila (1 pt)
Men	Sergio, Gustavo, Sergio, Gustavo	Strip dance	"Rock DJ"—Robbie Williams	Sergio, Gustavo (1 pt)

*The duel

- Josetty & Juan: Eliminated
- Víctor Hugo & Lindathay: Safe (2pts)

=== Week 13: Finals ===
On the first part, the couples danced cumbia and a freestyle performed in a rotating room.

On the second part, the final two couples danced quickstep.

Running order (Part 1)

Couple	Scores (Note: In this week, there was no secret vote because the winner was chosen by the votes of the public.)	Dance	Music	Result
Yamila & Gustavo	44 (9, 8, 9, 8, 10)	Cumbia	"Mi Estrella"—Hermanos Yaipén	Eliminated
Yamila & Gustavo	45 (9, 8, 9, 9, 10)	Freestyle	"Rehab"—Amy Winehouse	Eliminated
Claudia & Joel	44 (9, 8, 9, 8, 10)	Cumbia	"A Llorar a Otra Parte"—Hermanos Yaipén	Third place
Claudia & Joel	43 (9, 9, 7, 8, 10)	Freestyle	"Moves like Jagger"—Maroon 5 feat. Christina Aguilera	Third place
Emilia & Sergio	47 (10, 9, 9, 9, 10)	Cumbia	"Con los Hermanos Yaipén"—Hermanos Yaipén	Safe
Emilia & Sergio	47 (10, 9, 9, 9, 10)	Freestyle	"Bad Romance"—Lady Gaga	Safe
Víctor Hugo & Lindathay	44 (10, 8, 8, 8, 10)	Cumbia	"Una Rosa lo Sabe"—Hermanos Yaipén	Safe
Víctor Hugo & Lindathay	45 (8, 9, 8, 10, 10)	Freestyle	"Bootylicious"—Destiny's Child	Safe

Running order (Part 2)

Couple	Scores	Dance	Music	Result
Emilia & Sergio	47 (10, 9, 9, 9, 10)	Quickstep	"Valerie"—Mark Ronson feat. Amy Winehouse	Winners
Víctor Hugo & Lindathay	45 (8, 9, 9, 9, 10)	Quickstep	"You Can't Hurry Love"—Phil Collins	Runner-up

== Dance chart ==
The celebrities and professional partners will dance one of these routines for each corresponding week:

- Week 1: Cumbia, disco, latin pop, pachanga, reggaeton, or salsa (First Dances)
- Week 2: One unlearned dance (Party Night)
- Week 3: One unlearned dance (The '80s Night)
- Week 4: Cumbia or jazz & the danceathon (Cumbia & Jazz Night)
- Week 5: Pachanga or salsa & team dances (Pachanga & Salsa Night)
- Week 6: One unlearned dance & team dances (World Dances Night)
- Week 7: Ballroom dances & the versus (Movie Night)
- Week 8: Jive & the versus (Latin Rock Night)
- Week 9: Fusion dance & the little train (Glam Metal Night)
- Week 10: Cumbia & the versus (Cumbia Night)
- Week 11: Cumbia, adagio & the danceathon (Quarterfinals)
- Week 12: Quebradita, trio salsa & the little train (Semifinals)
- Week 13: Cumbia, freestyle & quickstep (Finals)

Couple	Week 1	Week 2	Week 3	Week 4	Week 5	Week 6	Week 7	Week 8	Week 9	Week 10	Week 11		Week 12		Week 13		
Emilia & Sergio	Cumbia	Disco	Latin pop	Jazz	Salsa	Rumba flamenca	Tango	Jive	Viennese waltz Cha-cha-cha	Cumbia	Cumbia	Adagio	Quebradita	Salsa	Cumbia	Freestyle	Quickstep
Víctor Hugo & Lindathay	Latin pop	Reggaeton	Salsa	Cumbia	Pachanga	Huaylasrh	Paso doble	Jive	Quickstep; Tango	Jazz	Cumbia	Adagio	Pachanga	Salsa	Cumbia	Freestyle	Quickstep
Claudia & Joel	Salsa	Cumbia	Jazz	Cumbia	Pachanga	Bachata	Samba	Jive	Cumbia	Cumbia	Jazz	Adagio	Quebradita	Salsa	Cumbia	Freestyle	
Yamila & Gustavo	Latin pop	Reggaeton	Salsa	Jazz	Pachanga	Belly dance	Rumba	Jive	Quickstep; Cha-cha-cha	Cumbia	Cumbia	Adagio	Quebradita	Salsa	Cumbia	Freestyle	
Josetty & Juan	Latin pop	Cumbia	Latin pop	Jazz	Salsa	Bollywood	Jive	Jive	Paso doble Samba	Salsa	Cumbia	Adagio	Reggaeton	Salsa			
Choca & Jacqueline	Salsa	Pachanga	Lambada	Cumbia	Salsa	Can-can	Samba	Jive	Reggaeton	Cumbia	Pachanga	Adagio					
André & Nazareth	Pachanga	Salsa	Latin pop	Jazz	Salsa	Country	Latin pop	Jazz	Waltz; Tango	Mambo							
Mariella & Angelo	Cumbia	Salsa	Merengue	Latin pop	Pachanga	Mambo	Tango	Jive	Latin pop								
Puchungo & Vania	Salsa	Cumbia	Festejo	Pachanga	Merengue	Jazz	Paso doble	Salsa									
Lucía & Emanuel	Reggaeton	Pachanga	Merengue	Jazz	Salsa	Reggaeton											
Joshua & Yamila	Reggaeton	Latin pop	Jazz	Cumbia	Jazz												
William & Diana	Disco	Cumbia	Festejo														

Modalities of competition
Couple	Week 4	Week 5	Week 6	Week 7	Week 8	Week 9	Week 10	Week 11	Week 12
Emilia & Sergio	Cumbia	K-pop	Hula	Merengue	Disco	Strip dance	Adagio	Festejo	Strip dance
Víctor Hugo & Lindathay	Cumbia	K-pop	Hula	Latin pop	Disco	Sexy dance	Adagio	Festejo	Strip dance
Claudia & Joel	Cumbia	K-pop	Hula	Merengue	Disco	Strip dance	Adagio	Festejo	Strip dance
Yamila & Gustavo	Cumbia	K-pop	Hula	Merengue	Disco	Strip dance	Adagio	Festejo	Strip dance
Josetty & Juan	Cumbia	K-pop	Hula	Latin pop	Disco	Strip dance	Adagio	Festejo	Strip dance
Choca & Jacqueline	Cumbia	K-pop	Hula	Latin pop	Disco	Strip dance	Adagio	Festejo	
André & Nazareth	Cumbia	K-pop	Hula	Reggaeton	Disco	Strip dance	Adagio		
Mariella & Angelo	Cumbia	K-pop	Hula	Reggaeton	Disco	Strip dance			
Puchungo & Vania	Cumbia	K-pop	Hula	Reggaeton	Disco				
Lucía & Emanuel	Cumbia	K-pop	Hula						
Joshua & Yamila	Cumbia	K-pop							
William & Diana									

Highest scoring dance
Lowest scoring dance
Gained bonus points for winning this dance
Gained no bonus points for losing this dance
In Italic indicate the dances performed in the duel
