= El Gran Show season 8 =

El Gran Show: Edición especial
- Season 8
- Hosted by: Gisela Valcárcel; Aldo Díaz; Óscar López Arias
- Judges: Morella Petrozzi; Pachi Valle Riestra; Carlos Cacho; Rosanna Lignarolo
- Celebrity winner: Karen Dejo
- Professional winner: Oreykel Hidalgo
- No. of episodes: 6

Release
- Original network: América Televisión
- Original release: November 24 – December 29, 2012

Season chronology
- ← Previous; Season 7 Next → Season 9

Special Edition of the 2012 edition of El Gran Show, it was the second season of 2012 and premiered on November 24, 2012.

In this season, the telephone vote in the duel was eliminated, being the couple saved the one that obtains the highest score. In the final, the winning couple was chosen only by the public vote, so there was no secret vote. In addition, the couples were divided into two teams, each one had as a coach Maricielo Effio or Belén Estévez, former contestants of the show; the winning couple of the season would turn their respective coach into winner.

On December 29, 2012, actress & TV host Karen Dejo and Oreykel Hidalgo were declared the winners, singer & actress Micheille Soifer and Christian Navarro finished second, while former MDO singer Alexis Grullón and Stephanie Palacios were third.

== Cast ==
=== Couples ===
For this season 8 celebrities were announced, including Karen Dejo, Miguel "Conejo" Rebosio, Pierina Carcelén and Delly Madrid. Alexis Grullón, who was a judge last season, competed as a celebrity. For this season Maricielo Effio and Belén Estévez returned, playing as coaches. Sergio Lois was the only professional dancer who returned from last season, the rest of the dancers are new to the dance floor.

During the show, Delly Madrid suffered an injury during the first week in the live show, being replaced in the following weeks by Belén Estévez, Leslie Shaw, Emilia Drago and Pamela Mármol until her recovery. Even so, because his period of recovery would take longer than expected, Madrid decided to withdraw the competition.

| Celebrity | Notability (known for) | Professional partner | Status |
|---|---|---|---|
| Pierina Carcelén | Actress & model | Juan Pablo Rodríguez | Eliminated 1st on December 1, 2012 |
| Delly Madrid | Model & actress | Sergio Lois | Withdrew on December 8, 2012 |
| Flor Polo | TV personality | Jorge Ávila | Eliminated 2nd on December 22, 2012 |
| Néstor Villanueva | TV personality | Mónica Crucet | Eliminated 3rd on December 29, 2012 |
| Miguel "Conejo" Rebosio | Former football player | Karen Tokashiki | Eliminated 4th on December 29, 2012 |
| Alexis Grullón | Former MDO singer | Stephanie Palacios | Third place on December 29, 2012 |
| Micheille Soifer | Singer & actress | Christian Navarro | Runner-up on December 29, 2012 |
| Karen Dejo | Actress & TV host | Oreykel Hidalgo | Winners on December 29, 2012 |

Teams
| Coach | Couples | |
|---|---|---|
| Maricielo Effio | Karen & Oreykel | Alexis & Stephanie |
| Maricielo Effio | Flor & Jorge | Conejo & Karen |
| Belén Estévez | Pierina & Juan Pablo | Delly & Sergio |
| Belén Estévez | Micheille & Christian | Néstor & Mónica |

=== Host and judges ===
Gisela Valcárcel, Aldo Díaz and Óscar López Arias returned as hosts, while Morella Petrozzi, Pachi Valle Riestra and the VIP Jury returned as judges. Carlos Cacho, former judge in Bailando por un sueño, and Rosanna Lignarolo, judge in the Segundo Campeonato Mundial de Baile, entered the show as new judges.

== Scoring charts ==
| Couple | Place | 1 | 2 | 3 | 4 | 5 | 6 | |
| Couple | Place | 1 | 2 | 3 | 4 | 5 | Top 5 | Top 4 |
|---|---|---|---|---|---|---|---|---|
| Karen & Oreykel | 1 | 33 | 42 | 84 | 85 | 82 | 85 | +43=128 |
| Micheille & Christian | 2 | 38 | 42 | 78 | 77 | 72 | 87 | +44=131 |
| Alexis & Stephanie | 3 | 33 | 33 | 65 | 79 | 65 | 73 | +37=110 |
| Conejo & Karen | 4 | 41 | 35 | 75 | 80 | 80 | 75 | +39=115 |
| Néstor & Mónica | 5 | 31 | 36 | 57 | 59 | 73 | 81 | |
| Flor & Jorge | 6 | 27 | 37 | 29 | 58 | 54 | | |
| Delly & Sergio | 7 | 37 | 43 | 72 | | | | |
| Pierina & Juan Pablo | 8 | 30 | 35 | | | | | |

Red numbers indicate the sentenced for each week
Green numbers indicate the best steps for each week
the couple was eliminated that week
the couple was safe in the duel
the couple was eliminated that week and safe with a lifeguard
this couple withdrew from the competition
the winning couple
the runner-up couple
the third-place couple

=== Average score chart ===
This table only counts dances scored on a 40-point scale (the VIP jury scores are excluded).

| Rank by average | Place | Couple | Total points | Number of dances | Average |
|---|---|---|---|---|---|
| 1 | 1 | Karen & Oreykel | 338 | 11 | 30.7 |
| 2 | 2 | Micheille & Christian | 327 | 11 | 29.7 |
| 3 | 4 | Conejo & Karen | 315 | 11 | 28.6 |
| 4 | 7 | Delly & Sergio | 113 | 4 | 28.3 |
| 5 | 3 | Alexis & Stephanie | 277 | 11 | 25.2 |
| 6 | 5 | Néstor & Mónica | 245 | 10 | 24.5 |
| 7 | 8 | Pierina & Juan Pablo | 45 | 2 | 22.5 |
| 8 | 6 | Flor & Jorge | 139 | 7 | 19.9 |

=== Highest and lowest scoring performances ===
The best and worst performances in each dance according to the judges' 40-point scale (the VIP jury scores are excluded) are as follows:

| Dance | Highest scored dancer(s) | Highest score | Lowest scored dancer(s) | Lowest score |
|---|---|---|---|---|
| Latin pop | Karen Dejo | 33 | Flor Polo | 20 |
| Quickstep | Néstor Villanueva | 25 | Alexis Grullón | 23 |
| Jive | Micheille Soifer | 30 | — | — |
| Tango | Miguel "Conejo" Rebosio | 25 | — | — |
| Festejo | Miguel "Conejo" Rebosio | 26 | Pierina Carcelén | 23 |
| Cumbia | Micheille Soifer | 32 | Flor Polo | 19 |
| Cha-cha-cha | Belén Estévez | 33 | — | — |
| Mambo | Karen Dejo | 30 | Miguel "Conejo" Rebosio | 29 |
| Disco | Karen Dejo | 35 | Néstor Villanueva | 18 |
| Reggaeton | Néstor Villanueva | 24 | Alexis Grullón | 20 |
| K-pop | Alexis Grullón | 27 | Micheille Soifer | 23 |
| Jazz | Karen Dejo; Alexis Grullón | 29 | Flor Polo | 21 |
| Heroes dances | Micheille Soifer; Miguel "Conejo" Rebosio | 33 | Flor Polo; Néstor Villanueva | 18 |
| Salsa | Micheille Soifer; Miguel "Conejo" Rebosio | 33 | Alexis Grullón | 22 |
| Adagio | Miguel "Conejo" Rebosio | 31 | Flor Polo; Néstor Villanueva | 18 |
| Foxtrot | Néstor Villanueva | 29 | — | — |
| Freestyle | Micheille Soifer | 35 | Miguel "Conejo" Rebosio | 29 |
| Waltz | Micheille Soifer | 34 | Alexis Grullón | 27 |

=== Couples' highest and lowest scoring dances ===
Scores are based upon a potential 40-point maximum (the VIP jury scores are excluded).

| Couples | Highest scoring dance(s) | Lowest scoring dance(s) |
|---|---|---|
| Karen & Oreykel | Disco (35) | Latin pop (23) |
| Micheille & Christian | Freestyle (35) | Adagio (24) |
| Alexis & Stephanie | Freestyle (30) | Reggaeton (20) |
| Conejo & Karen | Salsa (33) | Tango (25) |
| Néstor & Mónica | Cumbia (31) | Disco & Adagio (18) |
| Flor & Jorge | Cumbia (27) | Jazz (14) |
| Delly & Sergio | Cha-cha-cha (33) | Cumbia (22) |
| Pierina & Juan Pablo | Festejo (24) | Latin pop (21) |

== Weekly scores ==
Individual judges' scores in the charts below (given in parentheses) are listed in this order from left to right: Morella Petrozzi, Carlos Cacho, Rosanna Lignarolo, Pachi Valle Riestra, VIP Jury.

=== Week 1: Latin Pop Night ===
The couples danced latin pop and a team dance of hula.

During the team dances, Delly Madrid suffered a serious accident in her head, canceling the team round.

Running order

| Couple | Scores | Dance | Music | Result |
|---|---|---|---|---|
| Karen & Oreykel | 33 (7, 6, 3, 7, 10) | Latin pop | "Mujer Latina"—Thalía | Safe |
| Pierina & Juan Pablo | 30 (7, 5, 2, 7, 9) | Latin pop | "Tu Veneno"—Natalia Oreiro | Sentenced |
| Flor & Jorge | 27 (5, 5, 5, 5, 7) | Latin pop | "Y Yo Sigo Aquí"—Paulina Rubio | Sentenced |
| Néstor & Mónica | 31 (6, 5, 5, 6, 9) | Latin pop | "Salomé"—Chayanne | Safe |
| Delly & Sergio | 37 (8, 6, 6, 7, 10) | Latin pop | "Bailar Nada Más"—Jennifer Lopez feat. Pitbull | Safe |
| Alexis & Stephanie | 33 (8, 7, 4, 6, 8) | Latin pop | "Súbete a mi Moto"—Menudo | Safe |
| Micheille & Christian | 38 (8, 7, 5, 8, 10) | Latin pop | "Loca"—Shakira feat. El Cata | Safe |
| Conejo & Karen | 41 (9, 8, 7, 8, 9) | Latin pop | "Livin' la Vida Loca"—Ricky Martin | Best steps |
| Pierina & Juan Pablo; Delly & Sergio; Micheille & Christian; Néstor & Mónica | N/A | Hula (Team "Belén") | "Island Girl"—Burning Flames | |
| Karen & Oreykel; Alexis & Stephanie; Flor & Jorge; Conejo & Karen | N/A | Hula (Team "Maricielo") | "Mash It Up"—Burning Flames | |

=== Week 2: Movie Night ===
The couples (except those sentenced) performed one unlearned ballroom dance to famous film songs. In the versus, the couples faced dancing different dance styles.

Due to the Delly Madrid injury, Belén Estévez replaced her in the chachacha and Leslie Shaw in the versus.

Running order

| Couple | Scores | Dance | Music | Result |
|---|---|---|---|---|
| Alexis & Stephanie | 33 (7, 6, 3, 7, 10) | Quickstep | "We Go Together"—from Grease | Sentenced |
| Micheille & Christian | 40 (9, 8, 5, 8, 10) | Jive | "Footloose"—from Footloose | Safe |
| Conejo & Karen | 35 (8, 7, 4, 6, 10) | Tango | "Santa María (Del Buen Ayre)"—from Shall We Dance? | Sentenced |
| Pierina & Juan Pablo | 33 (7, 7, 3, 6, 10) | Festejo* | "Afroperuano"—Afroperu | —N/a |
| Flor & Jorge | 37 (7, 8, 5, 7, 10) | Cumbia* | "Ven a Bailar"—Euforia | Safe |
| Belén & Sergio | 43 (10, 8, 6, 9, 10) | Cha-cha-cha | "(I've Had) The Time of My Life"—from Dirty Dancing | Best steps |
| Karen & Oreykel | 40 (10, 7, 4, 9, 10) | Mambo | "Cuban Pete"—from The Mask | Safe |
| Néstor & Mónica | 34 (7, 5, 5, 8, 9) | Quickstep | "Mamma Mia"—from Mamma Mia! | Safe |

The versus
| Couple | Judges' votes | Dance | Music | Result |
|---|---|---|---|---|
| Néstor & Mónica | Néstor, Néstor, Néstor, Néstor | Cumbia | "Lejos de Ti"—Amaya Hermanos | Winners (2 pts) |
| Flor & Jorge | Néstor, Néstor, Néstor, Néstor | Cumbia | "Lejos de Ti"—Amaya Hermanos | Losers |
| Karen & Oreykel | Karen, Leslie, Karen, Karen | Merengue | "La Tanguita Roja"—Oro Solido | Winners (2 pts) |
| Leslie & Sergio | Karen, Leslie, Karen, Karen | Merengue | "La Tanguita Roja"—Oro Solido | Losers |
| Pierina & Juan Pablo | Pierina, Pierina, Alexis, Pierina | Reggaeton | "Quema, Quema"—Aldo & Dandy | Winners (2 pts) |
| Alexis & Stephanie | Pierina, Pierina, Alexis, Pierina | Reggaeton | "Quema, Quema"—Aldo & Dandy | Losers |
| Micheille & Christian | Micheille, Micheille, Micheille, Micheille | Salsa | "Aguanile"—Marc Anthony | Winners (2 pts) |
| Conejo & Karen | Micheille, Micheille, Micheille, Micheille | Salsa | "Aguanile"—Marc Anthony | Losers |

*The duel

- Pierina & Juan Pablo: Eliminated
- Flor & Jorge: Safe

=== Week 3: Cumbia & Disco Night ===
The couples danced cumbia and disco (except those sentenced).

Flor Polo suffered an injury at the end of her cumbia dance, so she could not dance her disco routine, being automatically sentenced.

Due to the Delly Madrid injury, Emilia Drago replaced her in the cumbia and Pamela Mármol in the disco. Finally, when it was announced that Alexis & Stephanie were eliminated, Madrid decided to withdraw the competition and give its place to the couple.

Running order

| Couple | Scores | Dance | Music | Result |
|---|---|---|---|---|
| Karen & Oreykel | 39 (9, 9, 4, 7, 10) | Cumbia | "El Arbolito"—Grupo Néctar | Best steps |
| Karen & Oreykel | 45 (10, 10, 7, 8, 10) | Disco | "Knock on Wood"—Amii Stewart | Best steps |
| Néstor & Mónica | 31 (6, 7, 4, 7, 7) | Cumbia | "Muchacho Provinciano"—Chacalón | Sentenced |
| Néstor & Mónica | 26 (6, 4, 3, 5, 8) | Disco | "Born to Be Alive"—Patrick Hernandez | Sentenced |
| Micheille & Christian | 38 (10, 6, 5, 7, 10) | Cumbia | "Eres Mentirosa"—Grupo Néctar | Safe |
| Micheille & Christian | 40 (9, 7, 6, 8, 10) | Disco | "Last Dance"—Donna Summer | Safe |
| Alexis & Stephanie | 35 (8, 6, 5, 6, 10) | Cumbia | "Cariñito"—Los Hijos del Sol | Safe |
| Alexis & Stephanie | 30 (8, 5, 2, 5, 10) | Reggaeton* | "Danza Kuduro" / "Taboo"—Don Omar | Safe |
| Conejo & Karen | 39 (7, 8, 6, 8, 10) | Cumbia | "Amigos Traigan Cerveza"—Los Ronisch | Safe |
| Conejo & Karen | 36 (8, 8, 4, 6, 10) | Festejo* | "Bailarás" / "Transe"—Perú Negro | Safe |
| Emilia & Sergio | 32 (7, 6, 3, 6, 10) | Cumbia | "Agonía de Amor"—Dilbert Aguilar y La Tribu | Withdrew |
| Pamela & Sergio | 40 (9, 7, 6, 9, 9) | Disco | "Disco Inferno"—The Trammps | Withdrew |
| Flor & Jorge | 29 (6, 6, 2, 5, 10) | Cumbia | "Te Eché al Olvido"—Tony Rosado | Sentenced |
| Flor & Jorge | N/A | Disco | "I Will Survive"—Gloria Gaynor | Sentenced |

*The duel

- Alexis & Stephanie: Eliminated (but then saved)
- Conejo & Karen: Safe

=== Week 4: Quarterfinals ===
The couples (except those sentenced) danced k-pop or latin pop, a heroes dance and a team dance. The heroes dance involved the celebrities dancing side by side to the same song and receiving the same set of scores from the judges for the routine.

Running order

| Couple | Scores | Dance | Music | Result |
|---|---|---|---|---|
| Micheille & Christian | 34 (7, 8, 4, 6, 9) | K-pop | "Bbiribbom Bberibbom"—Coed School | Safe |
| Conejo & Karen | 35 (7, 8, 5, 6, 9) | Latin pop | "El Teke Teke"—Crazy Design & Carlitos Wey | Safe |
| Flor & Jorge | 29 (5, 8, 3, 5, 8) | Jazz* | "Life Is a Cabaret"—Liza Minnelli | Sentenced |
| Néstor & Mónica | 32 (6, 6, 6, 6, 8) | Reggaeton* | "Impacto"—Daddy Yankee | Sentenced |
| Karen & Oreykel | 44 (10, 9, 6, 9, 10) | Latin pop | "Ojos Así" / "Rabiosa"—Shakira | Best steps |
| Alexis & Stephanie | 38 (8, 8, 5, 7, 10) | K-pop | "Fantastic Baby"—Big Bang | Safe |
| Micheille & Conejo | 43 (9, 9, 7, 8, 10) | Salsa | "Te Amaré"—Huey Dunbar | |
| Karen & Alexis | 39 (9, 8, 5, 7, 10) | Jazz | "Beautiful Liar"—Beyoncé feat. Shakira | |
| Flor & Néstor | 27 (4, 6, 3, 5, 9) | Adagio | "Perdóname"—Luciano Pereyra | |
| Alexis & Stephanie; Conejo & Karen; Flor & Jorge; Karen & Oreykel | 2 | Danza de tijeras (Team "Maricielo") | "Carnaval"—La Sarita | |
| Micheille & Christian; Néstor & Mónica | 0 | Marinera (Team "Belén") | "La Concheperla" | |

*The duel

- Flor & Jorge: Eliminated (but safe with the lifeguard)
- Néstor & Mónica: Safe

=== Week 5: Semifinals ===
The couples danced a favorite dance, adagio (except those sentenced) and a danceathon of jazz. This week, none couples were sentenced.

Running order

| Couple | Scores | Dance | Music | Result |
|---|---|---|---|---|
| Karen & Oreykel | 41 (10, 8, 5, 8, 10) | Salsa | "La Rebelión"—Joe Arroyo | Best steps |
| Karen & Oreykel | 39 (9, 9, 4, 7, 10) | Adagio | "Un Mundo Ideal"—Ricardo Montaner & Michelle | Best steps |
| Conejo & Karen | 39 (8, 9, 5, 7, 10) | Mambo | "Mambo N° 8"—Perez Prado | Safe |
| Conejo & Karen | 41 (10, 7, 5, 9, 10) | Adagio | "You'll Be in My Heart"—Phil Collins | Safe |
| Néstor & Mónica | 39 (8, 7, 6, 8, 10) | Foxtrot | "The Pink Panther Theme"—Henry Mancini | Safe |
| Néstor & Mónica | 34 (6, 5, 5, 8, 10) | Latin pop* | "Baila Baila"—Chayanne | Safe |
| Flor & Jorge | 30 (5, 5, 4, 6, 10) | Cumbia | "La Escobita" / "Así Son los Hombres"—Marisol y La Magia del Norte | —N/a |
| Flor & Jorge | 24 (4, 3, 2, 5, 10) | Jazz* | "Todo el Mundo Está Feliz" / "Illarie"—Xuxa | —N/a |
| Micheille & Christian | 38 (8, 9, 4, 7, 10) | Jazz | "Baby Boy"—Beyoncé feat. Sean Paul | Safe |
| Micheille & Christian | 34 (7, 7, 4, 6, 10) | Adagio | "La Bella y la Bestia"—Manuel Mijares & Rocío Banquells | Safe |
| Alexis & Stephanie | 32 (7, 6, 3, 6, 10) | Salsa | "Gozando en La Habana"—La Charanga Habanera | Safe |
| Alexis & Stephanie | 33 (7, 8, 3, 6, 9) | Adagio | "Sueña"—Luis Miguel | Safe |
| Karen & Oreykel; Alexis & Stephanie; Flor & Jorge; Conejo & Karen; Micheille & Christian; Néstor & Mónica | 2 | Jazz (The danceathon) | "Blanca Navidad" / "Que Lindo Churumbel" / "Oh Blanca Navidad"—Yola Polastri | |

*The duel

- Néstor & Mónica: Safe
- Flor & Jorge: Eliminated

=== Week 6: Finals ===
On the first part, the couples danced cumbia and freestyle.

On the second part, the final four couples danced waltz.

Running order (Part 1)

| Couple | Scores (Note: In this week, there was no secret vote because the winner was chosen by the votes of the public.) | Dance | Music | Result |
|---|---|---|---|---|
| Micheille & Christian | 42 (8, 9, 7, 8, 10) | Cumbia | "Lárgate"—Hermanos Yaipén | Safe |
| Micheille & Christian | 45 (9, 10, 8, 8, 10) | Freestyle | "Quimbara"—Celia Cruz & Johnny Pacheco | Safe |
| Conejo & Karen | 36 (8, 7, 4, 7, 10) | Cumbia | "Una Rosa lo Sabe"—Hermanos Yaipén | Safe |
| Conejo & Karen | 39 (8, 8, 5, 8, 10) | Freestyle | "Torero"—Chayanne | Safe |
| Alexis & Stephanie | 33 (7, 6, 4, 7, 9) | Cumbia | "A Llorar a Otra Parte"—Hermanos Yaipén | Safe |
| Alexis & Stephanie | 40 (8, 8, 7, 7, 10) | Freestyle | "Look at Me Now" / "Turn Up the Music"—Chris Brown | Safe |
| Karen & Oreykel | 41 (8, 9, 6, 8, 10) | Cumbia | "Ojalá Que Te Mueras"—Hermanos Yaipén | Safe |
| Karen & Oreykel | 44 (9, 9, 7, 9, 10) | Freestyle | "El Chicharrón"—Oro Solido | Safe |
| Néstor & Mónica | 41 (7, 8, 7, 9, 10) | Cumbia | "Humíllate"—Hermanos Yaipén | Eliminated |
| Néstor & Mónica | 40 (8, 8, 7, 7, 10) | Freestyle | "Sweet Dreams (Are Made of This)"—Eurythmics | Eliminated |

Running order (Part 2)

| Couple | Scores | Dance | Music | Result |
|---|---|---|---|---|
| Micheille & Christian | 44 (10, 8, 8, 8, 10) | Waltz | "Total Eclipse of the Heart"—Bonnie Tyler | Runner-up |
| Conejo & Karen | 39 (9, 8, 5, 7, 10) | Waltz | "My Heart Will Go On"—Celine Dion | Eliminated |
| Alexis & Stephanie | 37 (8, 8, 5, 6, 10) | Waltz | "I Will Always Love You"—Whitney Houston | Third place |
| Karen & Oreykel | 43 (10, 9, 6, 8, 10) | Waltz | "Angels"—Robbie Williams | Winners |

== Dance chart ==
The celebrities and professional partners will dance one of these routines for each corresponding week:

- Week 1: Latin pop & team dances (Latin Pop Night)
- Week 2: Ballroom dances & the versus (Movie Night)
- Week 3: Cumbia & disco (Cumbia & Disco Night)
- Week 4: K-pop or latin pop, heroes dances & team dances (Quarterfinals)
- Week 5: Favorite dance, adagio & team dances (Semifinals)
- Week 6: Cumbia, freestyle & waltz (Finals)

| Couple | Week 1 | Week 2 | | Week 3 | | Week 4 | | | Week 5 | | | Week 6 | | |
|---|---|---|---|---|---|---|---|---|---|---|---|---|---|---|
| Karen & Oreykel | Latin pop | Mambo | Merengue | Cumbia | Disco | Latin pop | Jazz | Danza de tijeras | Salsa | Adagio | Jazz | Cumbia | Freestyle | Waltz |
| Micheille & Christian | Latin pop | Jive | Salsa | Cumbia | Disco | K-pop | Salsa | Marinera | Jazz | Adagio | Jazz | Cumbia | Freestyle | Waltz |
| Alexis & Stephanie | Latin pop | Quickstep | Reggaeton | Cumbia | Reggaeton | K-pop | Jazz | Danza de tijeras | Salsa | Adagio | Jazz | Cumbia | Freestyle | Waltz |
| Conejo & Karen | Latin pop | Tango | Salsa | Cumbia | Festejo | Latin pop | Salsa | Danza de tijeras | Mambo | Adagio | Jazz | Cumbia | Freestyle | Waltz |
| Néstor & Mónica | Latin pop | Quickstep | Cumbia | Cumbia | Disco | Reggaeton | Adagio | Marinera | Foxtrot | Latin pop | Jazz | Cumbia | Freestyle | |
| Flor & Jorge | Latin pop | Cumbia | Cumbia | Cumbia | Disco | Jazz | Adagio | Danza de tijeras | Cumbia | Jazz | Jazz | | | |
| Delly & Sergio | Latin pop | Cha-cha-cha | Merengue | Cumbia | Disco | | | | | | | | | |
| Pierina & Juan Pablo | Latin pop | Festejo | Reggaeton | | | | | | | | | | | |

Highest scoring dance
Lowest scoring dance
Not scored or danced by the celebrity
Gained bonus points for winning this dance
Gained no bonus points for losing this dance
In Italic indicate the dances performed in the duel
