= Alma Bella (group) =

Peruvian cumbia group

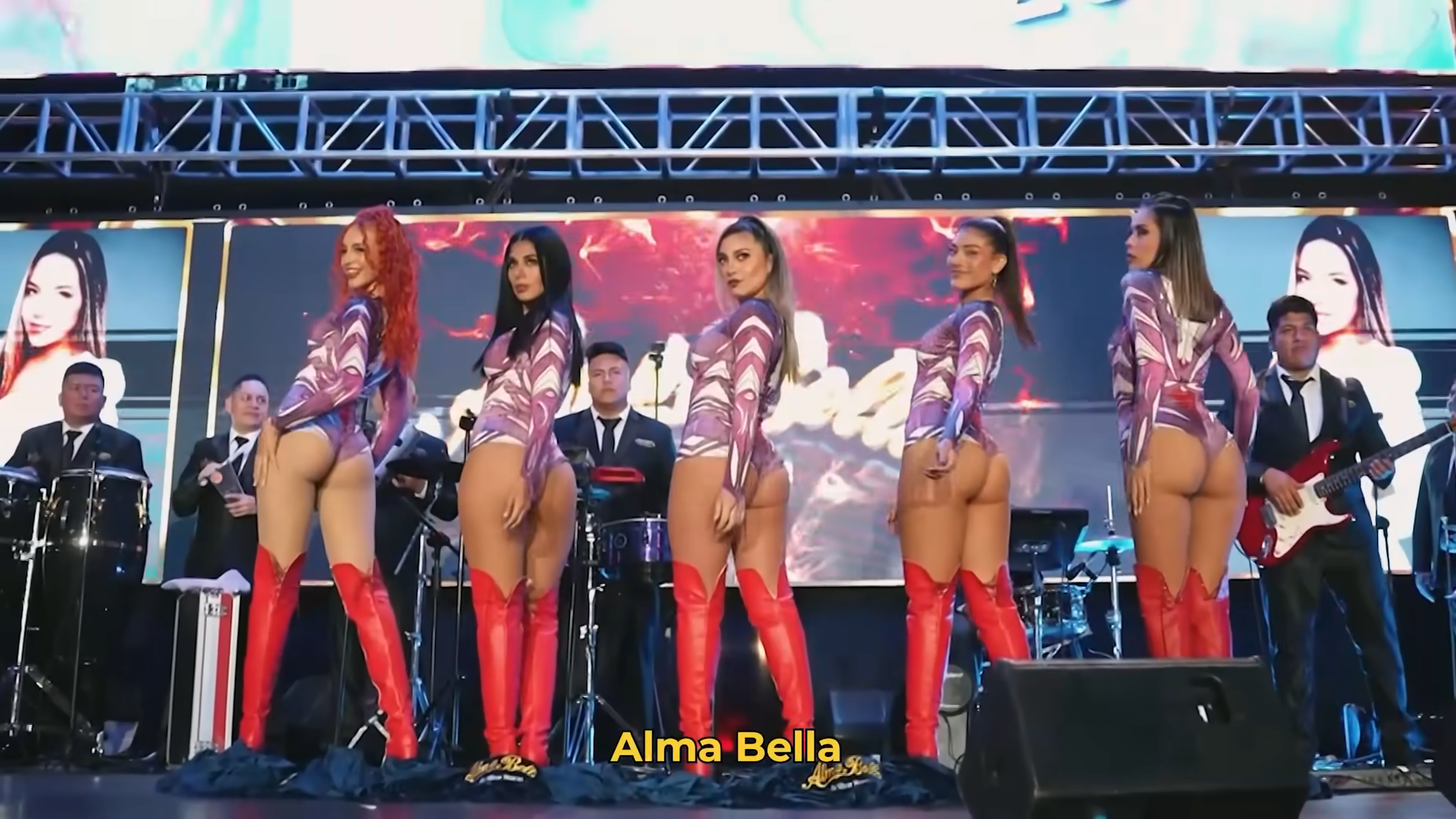
- Alma Bella in 2025

Background information
- Origin: Peru
- Genres: Cumbia, Technocumbia
- Years active: 2000-present
- Members: Yolanda Medina; Annabel Torres; Katty Garcia; Emily Vargas; Geraldine Ginocchio
- Past members: Mayra Goñi; Génesis Tapia; Micheille Soifer; Fiorella De La Cruz; Leysi Suárez; Alejandra Pascucci; Sally Portocarreo; Dorita Orbegoso; Yuly Rodríguez; Claudia Portocarrero; Aracely Bocanegra; Karen Dejo; Evelin Campos
- Website: grupoalmabellaperu.com

Alma Bella is a female Peruvian cumbia group that was created in 2000.

== Biography ==
This musical group has 10 years of artistic life. During this time, the group has always been a leader among women's groups in Peru. Almost 200 songs recorded summarize the successful career of Alma Bella.

Topics such as: Bombon asesino, Mermelada, Evidencias, Atrévete, Me ilusioné, Aventura, Amiga Mía, Dile, Lejos de Ti, Me Engañaste, Mi Delirio, many other successes have made this group in not only the audience favorite but also Peru abroad.

United States, Spain, Italy, Switzerland, Sweden, Costa Rica, Bolivia, Argentina, Chile and others permanently enjoy the artistic merits of this female quintet.

== Current members ==
Emily Vargas, Veronica Privat Shirley Mendoza and Yolanda Medina.

== Hits ==
- Reina de la cumbia
- Mermelada
- Bombón Asesino
- Atrévete
- Aventura
- Evidencias
- Amor entre mujeres
- Malo Malo
- Mentiroso
