= Nick Kosovich =

American ballroom dancer

Nick Kosovich is an American professional ballroom dancer specializing in American Smooth and International Ten Dance. Kosovich resides in Los Angeles. He is currently appearing in the "Second Dance World Championship" (Dance for a Dream) in Mexico City for the "Televisa" Company. He is the representative judge for Team USA. He retired from competition dancing in 2005; however, he has achieved many awards in his career. Kosovich, an internationally respected figure in the ballroom world, competed for 36 years. He competed in seven Professional World Championship events, won the United States American Smooth Championships and finished second in the 2004/5 World Classic Showdance Championships.

Kosovich has appeared in movies, including Shall We Dance? and also in Everyone Says I Love You, Blue in the Face, and Only with You, Mango Tango. He has also appeared on numerous TV network shows. Kosovich partnered with actress Tatum O'Neal in Season 2 of Dancing with the Stars. They were the second couple voted off, coming in 9th place. In Season 3, he was partnered with actress Vivica A. Fox until their elimination in the 4th week. He is an Emmy-nominated choreographer for his work on DWTS, most recently choreographing for Dance Your Ass Off seasons 1 and 2.

Kosovich and his wife Lena have a costume manufacturing business LENIQUE in LOS ANGELES, making costumes for world dance champions and Olympic figure skaters. Their figure skating clients have included Oksana Baiul, Tatiana Navka / Roman Kostomarov, Viktor Petrenko, Ekaterina Gordeeva, and Ilia Kulik. They have made costumes for Dancing with the Stars, So You Think You Can Dance, Dance Your Ass Off, Ballroom Boot Camp, America's Got Talent, American Ballroom Challenge, and thousands of dance competitors in the US.

== Achievements ==
- Prestige Awards Menswear designer for the year 2009
- Two-time U.S. American Ballroom Champion
- 2005 World American Ballroom Champion
- Two-time U.S. Classic Showdance Champion
- Two-time World Classic Showdance runner-up
- Arthur Murray National American Ballroom Champion

Numerous American smooth and showdance regional titles have Emmy-nominated choreographers. "Dancing with the Stars" is a two-time North American Couple of the Year. Prestige Award Winner Menswear Designer of the Year Australian and New Zealand Professional 10 Dance Representative Performances include: Academy Awards 2008, Philippine Star Ball, Dancing with the Stars, Triple Crown Dancesport Series, British Open Blackpool Demonstrators, RON Benise PBS Special.
