= Snejana Petrova =

Russian ballroom dancer

Snejana Petrova Sapir is a Russian ballroom dancer, most known for being the champion of the Second Dance World Championship celebrated in Mexico. Snejana won the national Junior & Youth 10 dance championships in Russia and also in the United States.

In 2008, Petrova placed in the top 13 couples with her partner, Erminio Stefano at the Blackpool Dance Festival. Petrova also danced with Nick Novikov and Tony Dovolani.

She also appeared in the tenth season of Dancing with the Stars (United States).
