= Claudia Portocarrero =

Peruvian cumbia dancer

Claudia Portocarrero (born 1 August 1985) is a Peruvian cumbia dancer. She was discovered by Nilver Huarac, and has performed with Alma Bella, Lisette, and her current friend and ex-boyfriend, Dilbert Aguilar.

Her fame began to grow on the show "Ritmo de los Sábados" (Saturday Rhythm). Later, she appeared in "Sábado Bravazo", "Tijereteando", "La combi", and "La Escuelita" (The Little School), where she played alongside well-known actors like Adolfo Chuiman, Pablo Villanueva "Melcochita", and Ramón García.

She has appeared on a popular televised tabloid program "Magaly TV(ATV)", has posed for Trome as one of the "Malcriadas", and appeared alongside Angie Jibaja and Micaela Page in a calendar entitled Goddesses 2007.

In the wake of her rising popularity, she was drafted to be a co-host with Beto Ortiz for the Panamericana (Channel 5) show ¡Qué Pais!, which debuted on 4 June 2007. The short-lived show was shown every Monday night from 8-10, which put it in direct opposition to the ATV show "Magaly TV(ATV)".

In 2013, she also competed in the dance reality show El Gran Show.
