= Leysi Suárez =

Peruvian dancer, actress and vedette (born 1985)

- Born: Lacey Zamudio Juárez; September 22, 1985 (age 40); Lima, Peru
- Occupations: Dancer, actress, vedette
- Known for: Dancer in Alma Bella

Leysi Suárez (born September 22, 1985) is a Peruvian dancer, actress and vedette.

== Television ==
- (2011): El Gran Show 2011 (season 1) ... 7th Place
- (2010 - act.) Recargados de Risa ... Cast
- (2009): Habacilar: Amigos y Rivales Club... 3rd Place
- (2008): El reventón de los sábados ... Co-host
- (2008): La súper movida de Jeanet ... Co-host
- (2007): Así es la vida... Kelly Alegre

== Musical Groups ==
- (2006–10): Alma Bella...Dancer
