= Bailando por un Sueño: Segundo Campeonato Mundial de Baile =

- Created by: Televisa
- Presented by: Yuri; Liza Echeverría
- Country of origin: Mexico
- No. of episodes: 10

Production
- Production location: Chedraui Great Theater
- Running time: 1–3 hours

Original release
- Network: Canal de las Estrellas
- Release: May 9 – July 11, 2010

Bailando Por un Sueño: Segundo Campeonato Mundial de Baile (Dancing for a Dream: Second Dance World Championship) was a TV show, where celebrities and dancers from a variety of dance shows, including Bailando por un Sueño, Dancing with the Stars, and So You Think You Can Dance, competed to obtain the Bicentenary Cup and to accomplish the dream of a Mexican family. It began on May 9, 2010 and finished on July 11, 2010, hosted by Yuri and Liza Echeverria. The show was aired at 19:00 (−6 GMT) on Sunday, by Canal de las Estrellas.

== Format ==
This show was based on the format of Bailando por un Sueño. Ten couples (formed by a celebrity and a professional dancer) competed each week against each other dancing several styles to impress a panel of judges. The judges gave to each performance a score from 1–10.

From the ten scores, there was a secret one, "The Secret Score" from one judge. It was revealed at the end of the show. Also, the highest and the lowest scores were cancelled, to eliminate favoritism.

At the end of each program, the lowest-scored couples were revealed. The next week, they confronted each other in a Dance-Off. Then, the judges voted to eliminate a couple. The couple with the highest number of votes from the judges were eliminated.

== Jury ==
There was a judge for each participating country

Country	Judge
Romania	Wilmark Rizzo
Colombia	Rossana Lignarolo
South Africa	Jonaid Carrera
Spain	Rafael Amargo
Argentina	Hugo Gómez
Mexico	Latin Lover
United Kingdom	Stuart Bishop
Peru	Carolina Vigil
United States	Nick Kosovich
France	Bérénice Bel

== The Couples ==
Country	Celebrity	Professional partner	Choreographer	Status
Colombia	María Cecilia Sánchez	Jaime Rincón	Richi Sánchez	Eliminated (Day 13) on May 23, 2010
United Kingdom	Lizzie Gough ^{2}	Benjamin Jones	Victoria Bissell	Eliminated (Day 27) on May 30, 2010
Romania	Laura Cosoi	Bogdan Boantă	Doina Botiș	Eliminated (Day 35) on June 27, 2010
South Africa	Michael Wentink	Beata Onefater	Gary Mills	Withdrew (Day 42) on June 13, 2010
Peru	Delly Madrid	Kervin Valdizan	Arturo Chumbe	Eliminated (Day 56) on June 20, 2010
France	Sevy Villete	Máxime Dereymez	Fauve Hautot	Eliminated (Day 70) on July 4, 2010
Mexico	Lis Vega^{3}	Luis David de los Ángeles^{1}	Alejandro Martínez/María	Eliminated (Day 77) on July 11, 2010
Argentina	Valeria Archimo	Leandro Nimo	Marisa de Risi	Third Place on July 11, 2010
Spain	Raquel Ortega	Kim Solé	Mauro Rossi	Second Place on July 11, 2010
United States	Snejana Petrova^{4}	Paul Barris	Vai Au-Harehoe	First Place on July 11, 2010

^1 Luis Grijalva withdrew from the competition in Week 2 because of his disagreement with the producers and his partner Alessandra Rosaldo. His replacement is Luis David de los Ángeles

^2 Charlie Bruce withdrew from the competition in Week 3 due to an injury in her leg. Her replacement is Lizzie Gough.

^3 Alessandra Rosaldo withdrew from the competition on May 29, due to an injury in her head. Her replacement is Liz Vega.

^4 Elena Grinenko withdrew from the competition in Week 5, due to pregnancy. Her replacement is Snejana Petrova.

=== The Dreams ===
Team	Dreamer Family	Dream
(Colombia) María Cecilia & Jaime	Fam. Acosta	To study Medicine
(United Kingdom) Lizzie & Benjamin	Fam. Figueiras	To fix their mechanic-garage
(South Africa) Michael & Beata	Fam. Saldaña	Re-meeting and family picture
(Peru) Delly & Kervin	Fam. Sánchez	To fix their ranch
(Romania) Laura & Bogdan	Fam. García	To publish Victoria Garcia's book with her fairy tales
(France) Sevy & Máxime	Fam. Zúñiga	To buy a piece of land to construct their house
(Mexico) Lis & Luis David	Fam. Cruz	To fix Julio Cruz' medical clinic
(Argentina) Valeria & Leandro	Fam. Altamirano	To celebrate a great 25th wedding anniversary
(Spain) Raquel & Kim	Fam. Pérez	To fix their truck
(United States) Snejana & Paul	Fam. González	To have their own house

== Scores ==
Team	Place	1	2	3^{5}	4	5^{6}	6^{7}	7	8	9	10	Final
(United States); Snejana & Paul	1	63	60	51+48=99	58+42=100	50+60=110	57+60=117	43+68+58=169	57+67+46=170	53+54+37=144	144+51+47=242	(South Africa) (Romania) (Argentina) (Mexico) (United Kingdom) (Peru) (France)
(Spain); Raquel & Kim	2	59	54	53+57–8=102	51+55=106	58+49=107	58+67-8=117	45+59+50=154	59+48+59=166	45+51+42=138	138+49+55=242	(Colombia)
(Argentina); Valeria & Leandro	3	68	51	51+56–8=99	43+66=109	62+44=106	54+61=115	48+51+62+1=162	48+58+50+2=158	40+46+46+9=141	141+54+47=242	
(Mexico); Lis & Luis David	4	58	59	50+55=105	51+52=103	60+71=131	65+65=130	44+48+52+2=146	60+47+57=164	43+39+50+8=140	140+36+1=177	
(France); Sevy & Máxime	5	64	48	49+58=107	51+48=99	43+55=98	52+54=106	57+52+53=162	44+54+43=141	0+0=0^{8}		
(Romania); Laura & Bogdan	6	64	47	45+62-8=99	51+45=96	52+55=107	Returning	43+49+43=135	38+45+52+2=137			
(Peru); Delly & Kervin	7	49	50	54+51=105	37+58=95	46+54=100	46+58=104	47+1=48				
(South Africa); Michael & Beata	8	56	56	57+53=110	58+51=109	67+56=123	WD					
(United Kingdom); Lizzie & Benjamin	9	54	56	45+56=101	33							
(Colombia); María Cecilia & Jaime	10	51	40	42								

Red numbers indicate the lowest score for each week.
Green numbers indicate the highest score for each week.
indicates the couple eliminated that week.
indicates the bottom-two couples, who were in the Dance-Off for next week.
indicates the returning couple that was in the Dance-Off, but wasn't eliminated that week.
indicates the returning couple that was in the Dance-Off and wasn't eliminated that week, but was in the bottom two and in the Dance-Off for next week.
indicates the couple that was in the Dance-Off for next week, but due to the withdrawal of other couple, there wasn't eliminated couples.
indicates that the couple withdrew from the competition.
indicates the winning couple.
indicates the runner-up couple.
indicates the third-place couple.

^5 Due to exceed the number of permitted lifts, it was announced on May 27 that Argentina, Romania and Spain had broken the rules and were penalized with 8 points. Then Argentina and Rumania were tied with USA with 99 points, so the bottom-four were USA, United Kingdom, Argentina and Romania.

^6 The second round of Week 5 consists of Jive and Cumbia Smackdowns. The contender pairs of couples were: France vs. Spain*, Argentina* vs. Peru, Mexico* vs. South Africa, and Romania vs. USA*. The winner of each Smackdown won 2 extra-points to their final score.

^7 In Week 6, team South Africa withdrew from the competition due to disagreements with the production. So, there weren't elimination. Romania and Colombia teams were in a Dance-Off to decide which team deserved to return to the competition (the winner was Romania team). So, the couple with the lowest score (Peru) has to confront to Romania in a Dance-Off in Week 7 to decide who will stay in the competition.

^8 In Week 9, due to an injury, Sevy Villete couldn't perform her first two dances (Paso Doble and Ballroom Rumba). Her replacement for these two dance was her choreographer Fauve Hautot, and the judges decided they haven't scored them. However, Sevy danced in the elimination Dance-Off.

=== Weekly Positions Chart ===
Team	1	2	3	4	5	6	7	8	9	10
(United States); Snejana & Paul	4	1	7	5	3	2	1	1	1	1
(Spain); Raquel & Kim	5	5	5	3	4	2	4	2	4	2
(Argentina); Valeria & Leandro	1	6	7	1	5	4	2	4	2	3
(Mexico); Lis & Luis David	6	2	3	4	1	1	5	3	3	4
(France); Sevy & Máxime	2	8	2	6	7	5	2	5	-	
(Romania); Laura & Bogdan	2	9	7	7	-	-	6	-		
(Peru); Delly & Kervin	10	7	3	8	6	6	-			
(South Africa); Michael & Beata	7	3	1	1	2	WD				
(United Kingdom); Lizzie & Benjamin	8	3	6	-						
(Colombia); María Cecilia & Jaime	9	10	-							

=== Dance-Off Chart ===
Week	Country	Bottom Two Couples	Style	Music	Votes to be Eliminated/Return ^{8}	Eliminated Couple
3	(Romania)	Laura & Bogdan	Disco	"It's Raining Men" – Geri Halliwell	(Spain)	María Cecilia & Jaime
3	(Colombia)	María Cecilia & Jaime	Disco	"Bad Girls" – Donna Summer	(South Africa) (Argentina) (Mexico) (United Kingdom) (Peru) (United States) (France)	María Cecilia & Jaime
4	(Romania)	Laura & Bogdan	Rock & Roll	"Roll Over Beethoven" – Chuck Berry	(France)	Lizzie & Benjamin
4	(United States)	Elena & Paul	Rock & Roll	"Great Balls of Fire" – Jerry Lee Lewis	None	Lizzie & Benjamin
4	(Argentina)	Valeria & Leandro	Rock & Roll	"Footloose" – Kenny Loggins	(South Africa)	Lizzie & Benjamin
4	(United Kingdom)	Lizzie & Benjamin	Rock & Roll	"Jailhouse Rock" – Elvis Presley	(Colombia) (Spain) (Mexico) (Peru)	Lizzie & Benjamin
5	(Peru)	Delly & Kervin	Salsa	"Caramelo a Kilo" – Alquimia	(Colombia) (South Africa) (Spain)	Laura & Bogdan
5	(Romania)	Laura & Bogdan	Salsa	"El Negro Está Cocinando" – Los Van Van	(Argentina) (Mexico) (United Kingdom) (United States) (France)	Laura & Bogdan
6^{9}	(Colombia)	Jorge Andrés & Mimi	Cuban Mambo	"Mambo No. 5" – Perez Prado	None	Laura & Bogdan^{8}
6^{9}	(Romania)	Laura & Bogdan	Ballroom Cha-Cha	"Celebration" – Madonna	(Romania) (Colombia) (South Africa) (Spain) (Argentina) (Mexico) (United Kingdom) (Peru) (United States) (France)	Laura & Bogdan^{8}
7	(Peru)	Delly & Kervin	Cuban Mambo	"Mambo del Politécnico" – Perez Prado	(Colombia) (South Africa) (Spain) (Argentina) (United States) (France)	Delly & Kervin
7	(Romania)	Laura & Bogdan	Ballroom Cha-Cha	"Let Me Think About It" – Ida Corr featuring Fedde le Grand	(Mexico) (United Kingdom)	Delly & Kervin
8	(Mexico)	Lis & Luis David	Samba	"Chillando La Goma" – Fulanito	None	Laura & Bogdan
8	(Spain)	Raquel & Kim	Freestyle	"Spybreak!" – Propellerheads/"Clubbed to Death" – Rob Dougan	(United Kingdom)	Laura & Bogdan
8	(Romania)	Laura & Bogdan	Samba	"Everybody Loves a Carnival" – Fatboy Slim	(Romania) (South Africa) (Argentina) (Peru) (United States) (France)	Laura & Bogdan
9 ^{10}	(Mexico)	Lis & Luis David	Merengue	"El Africano" – Wilfrido Martínez	None	Sevy & Máxime
9 ^{10}	(Argentina)	Valeria & Leandro	Contemporary	"Fallin'" – Alicia Keys	None	Sevy & Máxime
9 ^{10}	(France)	Sevy & Máxime	Cabaret	"Why Don't You Do Right?" – from the movie "Who Framed Roger Rabbit"	(Colombia) (South Africa) (Romania) (United Kingdom) (Peru) (United States)	Sevy & Máxime

^9 Due to South Africa's withdrawal, there was a special Dance-Off between Romania and Colombia to decide which team will return to the competition. The judges vote for the couple which deserve to return to the competition.

^10 The music for this Dance-Off was in charge of pianist Arthur Hanlon

== Best and Worst Dances ==
Place	Team	Total	Number of Dances	Average (Over 10)	Number of Sentences	Best Dances	Worst Dances
1	(United States) Snejana & Paul	1274	24	8.38	1	Demonstration (63/80); Quickstep (67/70); Ballroom Rumba (54/60)	Under the Rain (42/80); Hip-Hop (43/70); Tex Mex (37/60)
2	(Spain) Raquel & Kim	1245	24	8.19	1	Ballroom Cha-Cha (65/80); Salsa en Línea (59/70); Ballroom Cha-Cha (55/60)	Cumbia (49/80); Hip-Hop (45/60); Tex Mex (42/60)
3	(Argentina) Valeria & Leandro	1251	22	8.23	2	Demonstration (68/80); On the Sand (62/70); Acrobatic Lyrical (54/60)	Salsa (43/80); Hip-Hop, Salsa en Línea (48/70); Ballroom Rumba (40/60)
4	(Mexico) Lis & Luis David	1213	21	8.31	2	Cumbia (69/80); Salsa en Línea (60/70); Tex Mex (50/60)	Merengue (50/80); Quickstep (47/70); Flamenco Rumba (39/60)
5	(France) Sevy & Máxime	825	18	6.76	2	Demonstration (64/80); Hip-Hop (57/70); Paso Doble, Ballroom Rumba	Cumbia (43/80); Reggaeton (43/70)
6	(Romania) Laura & Bogdan	685	14	6.46	5	Demonstration (64/80); Reggaeton (50/70)	Merengue, Under the Rain (45/80); Salsa en Línea (38/70)
7	(Peru) Delly & Kervin	550	11	6.32	3	Under the Rain, Cumbia (58/80); Hip-Hop (47/70)	Salsa (37/80)
8	(South Africa) Michael & Beata	454	8	7.09	0	Jive (67/80)	Under The Rain (51/80)
9	(United Kingdom) Lizzie & Benjamin	244	5	6.10	1	Disco, Tango (56/80)	Under The Rain (33/80)
10	(Colombia) María Cecilia & Jaime	133	3	5.54	1	Demonstration (51/80)	Disco (40/80)

== Highest and lowest scoring performances ==
The best and worst performances in each dance according to the judges' marks are as follows:

Dance	Best dancer(s)	Best score	Worst dancer(s)	Worst score
Demonstration dance	Valeria Archimo	68/80	Delly Madrid	49/80
Disco	Elena Grinenko	60/80	María Cecilia Sánchez	40/80
Merengue	Michael Wentink	57/80	Laura Cosoi; Benjamin Jones	45/80
Tango	Laura Cosoi	62/80	Elena Grinenko	48/80
Salsa	Michael Wentink; Elena Grinenko	58/80	Delly Madrid	37/80
Under the rain	Valeria Archimo	66/80	Elena Grinenko	42/80
Jive	Michael Wentink	67/80	Valeria Archimo	44/80
Cumbia	Lis Vega	69/80	Sevy Villette	43/80
Ballroom Cha-Cha	Raquel Ortega; Raquel Ortega	65/80; 55/60	Delly Madrid; Snejana Petrova	46/80; 51/60
Cuban Mambo	Lis Vega	65/80	Valeria Archimo; Sevy Villette	54/80
Hip Hop	Sevy Villette	57/70	Laura Cosoi; Snejana Petrova	43/70
Samba	Snejana Petrova	66/70	Lis Vega	48/70
On the sand	Valeria Archimo	63/70	Laura Cosoi	43/70
Salsa en Línea	Lis Vega	60/70	Sevy Villette	44/70
Quickstep	Snejana Petrova	67/70	Lis Vega	47/70
Reggaeton	Valeria Archimo	58/70	Sevy Villette	43/70
Ballroom Rumba	Snejana Petrova	54/60	Valeria Archimo; Fauve Hautot	40/60; 0/60
Flamenco Rumba	Valeria Archimo	46/60	Lis Vega	39/60
Paso Doble	Snejana Petrova	53/60	Raquel Ortega; Fauve Hautot	45/60; 0/60
Tex Mex	Lis Vega	50/60	Snejana Petrova	37/60
In the Turning Room	Valeria Archimo	9	Lis Vega; Paul Barris; Raquel Ortega	0
Waltz	Raquel Ortega; Snejana Petrova	49/60; Unscored	None	None
Acrobatic Lyrical	Valeria Archimo; Raquel Ortega	54/60; Unscored	Snejana Petrova	47/60
Quebradita	Valeria Archimo; Raquel Ortega; Snejana Petrova	47/60; Unscored; Unscored	Lis Vega	36/60

== Dance Schedule ==
The celebrities and professional partners danced these routines for each corresponding week.

- Week 1: Demonstration Dance
- Week 2: Disco
- Week 3: Tango & Merengue
- Week 4: Salsa & Freestyle Under the rain
- Week 5: Jive & Cumbia
- Week 6: Ballroom Cha-Cha & Cuban Mambo
- Week 7: Hip-Hop, Samba & Freestyle On the sand
- Week 8: Salsa en Línea, Quickstep & Reggaeton
- Week 9: Ballroom Rumba, Flamenco Rumba/Paso Doble, Tex Mex & Freestyle in The Turning Room
- Week 10: Dances chosen by each team: Waltz (United States) , Ballroom Cha-Cha (Spain) , Quebradita (Mexico) & Acrobatic Lyrical (Argentina)

Country	Team	1	2	3		4		5		6		7			8			9				10			
(United States)	Snejana & Paul	Ballroom Cha-Cha	Disco	Merengue	Tango	Salsa	Under the Rain	Cumbia	Jive^{9}	Ballroom Cha-Cha	Cuban Mambo^{9}	Hip-Hop	Samba^{9}	On the Sand	Salsa en Línea	Quickstep	Reggaeton^{9}	Paso Doble	Ballroom Rumba	Tex Mex	In the Turning Room^{15}	Ballroom Cha-Cha	Acrobatic Lyrical	Quebradita^{16}	Waltz^{16}
(Spain)	Raquel & Kim	Jive	Disco	Merengue	Tango	Salsa	Under the Rain	Cumbia	Jive^{9}	Cuban Mambo	Ballroom Cha-Cha^{9}	Hip-Hop	Samba^{9}	On the Sand	Salsa en Línea	Reggaeton	Quickstep^{9}	Paso Doble	Ballroom Rumba	Tex Mex	In the Turning Room^{15}	Waltz	Ballroom Cha-Cha	Quebradita^{16}	Acrobatic Lyrical^{16}
(Argentina)	Valeria & Leandro	Tango/Adagio	Disco	Merengue	Tango	Salsa	Under the Rain	Jive	Cumbia^{9}	Cuban Mambo	Ballroom Cha-Cha^{9}	Hip-Hop	Samba^{9}	On the Sand	Salsa en Línea	Reggaeton	Quickstep^{9}	Ballroom Rumba	Flamenco Rumba	In the Turning Room^{15}	Tex Mex	Acrobatic Lyrical	Quebradita		
(Mexico)	Lis & Luis David	Jive	Disco	Merengue	Tango	Salsa	Under the Rain	Jive	Cumbia^{9}	Ballroom Cha-Cha	Cuban Mambo^{9}	Hip-Hop	Samba^{9}	On the Sand	Salsa en Línea	Quickstep	Reggaeton^{9}	Ballroom Rumba	Flamenco Rumba	In the Turning Room^{15}	Tex Mex	Quebradita			
(France)	Sevy & Máxime	Chanson/Salsa	Disco	Merengue	Tango	Salsa	Under the Rain	Cumbia	Jive^{9}	Ballroom Cha-Cha	Cuban Mambo^{9}	Hip-Hop	Samba^{9}	On the Sand	Salsa en Línea	Quickstep	Reggaeton^{9}	Paso Doble	Ballroom Rumba						
(Romania)	Laura & Bogdan	Contemporary	Disco	Merengue	Tango	Salsa	Under the Rain	Cumbia	Jive^{9}	Dance-Off to return to the competition		Hip-Hop	Samba^{9}	On the Sand	Salsa en Línea	Quickstep	Reggaeton^{9}								
(Peru)	Delly & Kervin	Merengue	Disco	Merengue	Tango	Salsa	Under the Rain	Jive	Cumbia^{9}	Ballroom Cha-Cha	Cuban Mambo^{9}	Hip-Hop													
(South Africa)	Michael & Beata	Samba	Disco	Merengue	Tango	Salsa	Under the Rain	Jive	Cumbia^{9}																
(United Kingdom)	Lizzie & Benjamin	Ballroom Cha-Cha	Disco	Merengue	Tango	Under the Rain																			
(Colombia)	María Cecilia & Jaime	Contemporary	Disco	Tango																					

Highest scoring dance
Lowest scoring dance

^9 This was a Dance-Off dance.

^15 This was a special challenge: All the teams had to do a special choreography in an anti-gravitatory room, in a team or a solo. The winner awarded 9 estra-points added to their final score

^16 These dances were unscored. The winner couple was chosen by the votes from the jury.

== Music ==
=== Week 1 ===
Individual judges scores in the chart below (given in parentheses) are listed in this order from left to right: Wilmark Rizzo, Rossana Lignarolo, Jonaid Carrera, Rafael Amargo, Hugo Gómez, Latin Lover, Stuart Bishop, Carolina Vigil, Nick Kosovich and Bérénice Bel.

Running order

Country	Team	Score	Style	Music
(South Africa)	Michael & Beata	56 (7,4,8,8,8,8,6,6,6,7)	Samba	African Samba
(Peru)	Delly & Kervin	49 (6,2,6,7,8,7,6,6,5,6)	Merengue	"La Cosquillita" – Juan Luis Guerra
(Spain)	Raquel & Kim	59 (8,5,7,9,9,8,5,8,7,7)	Jive	"Boogie Woogie Bugle Boy" – Bette Midler
(United Kingdom)	Charlie & Benjamin	54 (6,4,6,8,9,8,7,6,6,7)	Ballroom Cha-Cha	"Poker Face" – Lady Gaga
(Colombia)	María Cecilia & Jaime	51 (6,3,8,8,7,7,5,5,7,6)	Contemporary	"Piano & I" – Alicia Keys
(France)	Sevy & Máxime	64 (8,6,8,9,9,9,8,7,7,8)	Chanson/Salsa	"La Vie en Rose" – Edith Piaf/"Salsa y Sabor" – Tito Puente
(Argentina)	Valeria & Leandro	68 (8,5,9,10,9,9,8,9,8,8)	Tango/Adagio	"Adiós Nonino" – Ástor Piazzolla
(United States)	Elena & Paul	63 (8,6,8,8,8,9,8,7,8,8)	Ballroom Cha-Cha	"Oye Como Va" – Carlos Santana
(Romania)	Laura & Bogdan	64 (9,4,9,7,7,8,8,8,8,9)	Contemporary	"I Don't Believe You" – Pink
(Mexico)	Alessandra & Luis	58 (7,3,7,7,8,8,8,6,8,7)	Jive	"Candyman" – Christina Aguilera

=== Week 2 ===
Individual judges scores in the chart below (given in parentheses) are listed in this order from left to right: Wilmark Rizzo, Rossana Lignarolo, Jonaid Carrera, Rafael Amargo, Hugo Gómez, Latin Lover, Stuart Bishop, Carolina Vigil, Nick Kosovich and Bérénice Bel.

The bold and italic numbers represent the highest and the lowest scores, which was cancelled from the final score.

Secret Score: Stuart Bishop.

Running order

Country	Team	Score	Style	Music
(Argentina)	Valeria & Leandro	51 (6,4,6,7,8,8,5,6,7,6)	Disco	"Disco Inferno" – Bee Gees
(France)	Sevy & Máxime	48 (6,5,7,5,6,7,X,6,6,9)	Disco	"Don't Stop 'Till You Get Enough" – Michael Jackson
(United States)	Elena & Paul	60 (8,6,9,6,7,8,8,7,9,7)	Disco	"Hush Hush" – The Pussycat Dolls
(Peru)	Delly & Kervin	50 (7,4,6,5,6,7,6,8,7,6)	Disco	"Boogie Wonderland" – Earth, Wind and Fire
(South Africa)	Michael & Beata	56 (8,5,8,6,7,9,X,8,7,7)	Disco	"Born To Be Alive – Patrick Hernandez
(United Kingdom)	Charlie & Benjamin	56 (7,5,7,7,7,7,7,7,7,7)	Disco	"Blame It On The Boogie" – Michael Jackson
(Spain)	Raquel & Kim	54 (7,5,5,9,7,7,6,7,8,7)	Disco	"Last Dance" – Donna Summer
(Colombia)	María Cecilia & Jaime	40 (5,4,6,6,4,6,X,5,5,5)	Disco	"Hung Up" – Madonna
(Mexico)	Alessandra & Luis David	59 (7,4,7,6,8,9,9,6,8,8)	Disco	"Knock On Wood" – Amii Stewart
(Romania)	Laura & Bogdan	47 (7,4,6,5,7,7,X,5,6,7)	Disco	"Shady Lady" – Ani Lorak

=== Week 3 ===
Individual judges scores in the chart below (given in parentheses) are listed in this order from left to right: Wilmark Rizzo, Rossana Lignarolo, Jonaid Carrera, Rafael Amargo, Hugo Gómez, Latin Lover, Stuart Bishop, Carolina Vigil, Nick Kosovich and Bérénice Bel.

The bold and italic numbers represent the highest and the lowest scores, which was cancelled from the final score.

Secret Score: Latin Lover.

Running order

Country	Team	Score	Style	Music
(Spain)	Raquel & Kim	53 (6,4,6,8,7,7,7,6,7,7)	Merengue	"A Pedir Su Mano" – Juan Luis Guerra
(Spain)	Raquel & Kim	57 (7,5,7,8,8,8,7,7,6,7)	Tango	"Tango de Roxanne" – from the movie Moulin Rouge!
(Colombia)	María Cecilia & Jaime	42 (7,5,6,7,6,?,5,6,8,5)	Tango	"Gallo Ciego" – Forever Tango
(United Kingdom)	Benjamin	45 (6,2,5,5,6,7,8,5,6,5)	Merengue	"A Cualquiera" – Sergio Vargas
(United Kingdom)	Benjamin	56 (8,4,7,7,6,8,9,7,6,7)	Tango	"Tanguera" – Mariano Mores
(Romania)	Laura & Bogdan	62 (9,6,8,9,7,8,8,7,7,8)	Tango	"Tango De Los Exiliados" – Vanessa Mae
(Romania)	Laura & Bogdan	45 (6,4,6,5,6,X,5,5,6,6)	Merengue	"Que Baile Así" – Leidy Bonilla
(Peru)	Delly & Kervin	54 (7,2,6,6,6,X,7,8,8,6)	Merengue	"El Chicharrón" – Oro Sólido
(Peru)	Delly & Kervin	51 (7,5,7,6,7,7,5,8,5,7)	Tango	"Por Una Cabeza" – from the movie Scent of a Woman
(South Africa)	Michael & Beata	53 (7,5,8,6,5,X,6,7,7,7)	Tango	"Cell Block Tango" – from Chicago: The Musical
(South Africa)	Michael & Beata	57 (7,6,8,7,7,8,8,7,7,6)	Merengue	"Chupacabras" – Banda Boom IV
(Mexico)	Alessandra & Luis David	50 (6,3,8,6,7,7,6,6,6,6)	Merengue	"Estas Enamorada" – Limi-t 21
(Mexico)	Alessandra & Luis David	55 (6,5,6,8,8,X,7,5,8,7)	Tango	"Obertura" – Forever Tango
(France)	Sevy & Máxime	58 (8,6,7,6,6,8,7,8,8,8)	Tango	"Oblivion" – Ástor Piazzolla
(France)	Sevy & Máxime	49 (7,5,6,5,6,6,5,7,7,8)	Merengue	"La Morena" – Oro Sólido
(Argentina)	Valeria & Leandro	51 (5,4,6,8,8,6,6,7,7,6)	Merengue	"La Dueña Del Swing" – Los Hermanos Rosario
(Argentina)	Valeria & Leandro	56 (8,5,6,8,9,8,5,8,7,6)	Tango	"Libertango" – Forever Tango
(United States)	Elena & Paul	48 (6,5,6,6,6,6,6,6,8,6)	Tango	"Tanguedia III" – Ástor Piazzolla
(United States)	Elena & Paul	51 (7,4,5,6,7,X,6,7,7,6)	Merengue	"El Beeper" – Oro Sólido

=== Week 4 ===
Individual judges scores in the chart below (given in parentheses) are listed in this order from left to right: Wilmark Rizo, Rossana Lignarolo, Jonaid Carrera, Rafael Amargo, Hugo Gómez, Latin Lover, Stuart Bishop, Carolina Vigil, Nick Kosovich and Bérénice Bel.

The bold and italic numbers represent the highest and the lowest scores, which was cancelled from the final score.

Secret Score: Wilmark Rizzo

Running order

Country	Team	Score	Style	Music
(Romania)	Laura & Bogdan	45 (X,4,5,6,6,7,4,5,6,6)	Under the rain	"Love's Divine" – Seal
(Romania)	Laura & Bogdan	51 (7,6,7,5,7,8,3,6,7,6)	Salsa	"Soy El Rey" – Sonora Carruseles
(United States)	Elena & Paul	42 (6,3,4,6,6,7,4,4,7,5)	Under the rain	"Billie Jean" – David Cook
(United States)	Elena & Paul	58 (X,5,8,7,7,8,5,8,8,7)	Salsa	"Capurano" – Johnny Sedes
(Argentina)	Valeria & Leandro	66 (8,4,7,9,9,9,8,8,9,8)	Under the rain	"Feeling Good – Michael Bublé
(Argentina)	Valeria & Leandro	43 (6,3,6,6,8,6,3,6,4,6)	Salsa	"Ojos Negros" – Tito Puente featuring Santos Colon
(United Kingdom)	Lizzie & Benjamin	33 (",3,5,4,5,6,8,4,4,5)	Under the rain	"The Way I Are – Timbaland featuring Keri Hilson and D.O.E.
(Peru)	Delly & Kervin	37 (5,3,5,4,4,6,6,7,2,4)	Salsa	"La Malanga" – Eddie Palmieri
(Peru)	Delly & Kervin	58 (7,4,7,7,7,8,8,8,8,6)	Under the rain	"Telephone" – Lady Gaga featuring Beyoncé
(Spain)	Raquel & Kim	51 (X,5,7,8,8,7,7,7,5,5)	Salsa	"Acuyuyé" – DLG
(Spain)	Raquel & Kim	55 (6,5,7,9,8,8,7,6,7,6)	Under the rain	"Lo Hecho Está Hecho – Shakira
(South Africa)	Michael & Beata	58 (7,6,8,8,7,9,8,8,5,6)	Salsa	"Quimbara" – Celia Cruz/"Arranca" – Manzanita
(South Africa)	Michael & Beata	51 (6,6,7,6,6,8,9,6,6,6)	Under the rain	"My Heart Will Go On" – Celine Dion
(Mexico)	Lis & Luis David	51 (6,4,7,8,8,7,4,6,6,7)	Salsa	"Sabor A Béisbol" – Victor Manuelle
(Mexico)	Lis & Luis David	52 (7,4,6,7,7,7,5,5,8,8)	Under the rain	"Algo Más" – La 5ª Estación/"4 Minutes" – Madonna featuring Justin Timberlake
(France)	Sevy & Máxime	51 (7,5,6,5,7,7,7,5,7,8)	Salsa	"Conga" – Gloria Estefan
(France)	Sevy & Máxime	48 (6,5,5,6,6,7,6,6,6,7)	Under the rain	"Lady Marmalade" – Christina Aguilera, Lil' Kim, Mýa & Pink

=== Week 5 ===
Individual judges scores in the chart below (given in parentheses) are listed in this order from left to right: Wilmark Rizzo, Rossana Lignarolo, Jonaid Carrera, Rafael Amargo, Hugo Gómez, Latin Lover, Stuart Bishop, Carolina Vigil, Nick Kosovich and Bérénice Bel.

The bold and italic numbers represent the highest and the lowest scores, which was cancelled from the final score.

Secret Score: Bérénice Bel

Running order

Country	Team	Score	Style	Music
(France)	Sevy & Máxime	43 (5,4,5,4,6,6,6,5,6,X)	Cumbia	"Que Nadie Sepa Mi Sufrir" – La Sonora de Margarita
(Peru)	Delly & Kervin	46 (6,4,4,6,6,7,7,8,5,5)	Jive	"Hanky Panky" – Madonna
(Argentina)	Valeria & Leandro	44 (5,5,4,7,8,6,5,5,6,5)	Jive	"Stuff Like That There" – Bette Midler
(United States)	Snejana & Paul	50 (6,5,7,5,6,8,8,5,7,6)	Cumbia	"Mi Cucu" – La Sonora Dinamita
(South Africa)	Michael & Beata	67 (9,8,9,8,7,9,8,8,9,8)	Jive	"Proud Mary" – Ike & Tina Turner
(Romania)	Laura & Bogdan	52 (8,7,7,7,7,7,5,5,7,X)	Cumbia	"La Colegiala" – Caló & Margarita
(Mexico)	Lis & Luis David	60 (7,7,8,8,7,8,7,7,8,8)	Jive	"Jump, Jive an' Wail" – Brian Setzer Orchestra
(Spain)	Raquel & Kim	49 (7,6,6,8,7,6,5,6,4,6)	Cumbia	"Single Ladies (Put a Ring on It)" – Beyoncé/"Los Luchadores" – Conjunto África

==== Dance Off's ====
Country	Team	Score	Style	Music	Winner
(Romania)	Laura & Bogdan	55 (8,7,8,7,7,8,5,6,6,6)	Jive	"Girlfriend" – Avril Lavigne	Snejana & Paul
(United States)	Snejana & Paul	58+2=60 (7,7,7,6,8,8,7,8,8,6)	Jive	"Land of a Thousand Dances" – Wilson Pickett	Snejana & Paul
(Argentina)	Valeria & Leandro	60+2=62 (9,7,7,7,8,7,9,7,8,7)	Cumbia	"La Gúera Salomé" – Lia Crucet	Valeria & Leandro
(Peru)	Delly & Kervin	54 (7,6,6,7,7,7,7,8,7,6)	Cumbia	"La Culebritica" – Grupo 5	Valeria & Leandro
(Spain)	Raquel & Kim	56+2=58 (7,6,6,8,7,7,7,8,8,6)	Jive	"I'm A Woman" – Peggy Lee/"Choo Choo Ch'Boogie" – The Manhattan Transfer	Raquel & Kim
(France)	Sevy & Máxime	55 (6,6,7,5,6,8,7,8,7,8)	Jive	"I Wanna Be Like You" – Kenny Ball	Raquel & Kim
(Mexico)	Lis & Luis David	69+2=71 (9,8,8,10,9,9,8,9,9,8)	Cumbia	"Juana la Cubana" – Los Joao	Lis & Luis David
(South Africa)	Michael & Beata	56 (7,7,7,7,8,7,6,7,7,7)	Cumbia	"Mi Bombón" – La Sonora de Margarita	Lis & Luis David

=== Week 6 ===
Individual judges scores in the chart below (given in parentheses) are listed in this order from left to right: Wilmark Rizzo, Rossana Lignarolo, Jonaid Carrera, Rafael Amargo, Hugo Gómez, Latin Lover, Stuart Bishop, Carolina Vigil, Nick Kosovich and Bérénice Bel.

The bold and italic numbers represent the highest and the lowest scores, which was cancelled from the final score.

Secret Score: Nick Kosovich

Running order

Country	Team	Score	Style	Music
(Peru)	Delly & Kervin	46 (4,4,6,6,7,7,7,7,X,5)	Ballroom Cha-Cha	"Sway" – Michael Bublé
(Argentina)	Valeria & Leandro	48 (7,5,7,7,8,7,6,7,6,7)	Cuban Mambo	"Que Rico Mambo" – Perez Prado
(United States)	Snejana & Paul	50 (7,7,9,7,7,8,6,8,7,6)	Ballroom Cha-Cha	"Fever" – La India & Tito Puente
(Mexico)	Lis & Luis David	58 (6,8,9,9,7,9,9,8,7,8)	Ballroom Cha-Cha	"Echa Pa'lante" – Thalía
(Spain)	Raquel & Kim	58^{10} (8,7,8,9,7,8,7,6,7,6)	Cuban Mambo	"Lupita" – Perez Prado
(France)	Sevy & Máxime	52 (5,4,5,4,6,6,6,5,6,X)	Ballroom Cha-Cha	"Beggin'" – Madcon

^10 Spain was penalized with 8 points due to exceed the number of permitted lifts (3)

==== Dance Off's ====
Country	Team	Score	Style	Music	Winner
(Peru)	Delly & Kervin	58 (7,5,8,7,7,8,8,8,7,6)	Cuban Mambo	"La Niña Popoff" – Perez Prado	Snejana & Paul^{11}
(United States)	Snejana & Paul	58+2=60 (7,8,7,7,7,7,6,7,8,8)	Cuban Mambo	"Dance At The Gym" – West Side Story	Snejana & Paul^{11}
(Spain)	Raquel & Kim	65+2=67 (10,9,9,9,7,9,5,7,8,7)	Ballroom Cha-Cha	"Unchain My Heart" – Joe Cocker	Raquel & Kim
(Argentina)	Valeria & Leandro	61 (8,8,8,7,8,8,7,7,7,8)	Ballroom Cha-Cha	"I Like It Like That" – Pete Rodriguez & Tito Puente	Raquel & Kim
(Mexico)	Lis & Luis David	63+2=65 (10,9,9,9,7,9,5,7,8,7)	Cuban Mambo	"Mambo No. 8" – Perez Prado	Lis & Luis David
(France)	Sevy & Maxime	54 (7,7,6,7,7,7,6,6,7,8)	Cuban Mambo	"Bonito y Sabroso" – Benny Moré	Lis & Luis David

^11 Peru & USA were tied with 58 points, so Rossana Lignarolo (Colombian Judge) had to choose the winner team, and she chose USA

=== Week 7 ===
Individual judges scores in the chart below (given in parentheses) are listed in this order from left to right: Wilmark Rizzo, Rossana Lignarolo, Jonaid Carrera, Rafael Amargo, Hugo Gómez, Latin Lover, Stuart Bishop, Carolina Vigil, Nick Kosovich and Bérénice Bel.

The bold and italic numbers represent the highest and the lowest scores, which was cancelled from the final score.

/ means the judge of each country can't vote for him/her own country

Secret Score: Rossana Lignarolo

Running order

Country	Team	Score	Style	Music
(Mexico)	Lis & Luis David	44 (6,6,6,8,6,/,5,6,7,7)	Hip-Hop	"Baby" – Justin Bieber
(Mexico)	Lis & Luis David	52 (8,7,7,7,8,/,8,6,8,7)	On the Sand	"My Love Is for Real" – Paula Abdul
(Spain)	Raquel & Kim	45 (8,7,7,/,7,7,5,6,6,5)	Hip-Hop	"TiK ToK" – Ke$ha
(Spain)	Raquel & Kim	50 (7,7,7,/,8,8,6,7,7,7)	On the Sand	"Ti Voglio Bene/Be Italian" – from the musical Nine
(Romania)	Laura & Bogdan	43 (/,6,6,7,7,7,5,5,6,6)	Hop-Hop	"Get Your Freak On" – Missy Elliott
(Romania)	Laura & Bogdan	43 (/,8,5,7,7,7,4,5,6,6)	On the Sand	"Kibori" – Mahala Rai Banda
(Peru)	Delly & Kervin	47 (6,X,7,7,7,9,10,/,5,6)	Hip-Hop	"When I Grow Up" – The Pussycat Dolls
(Argentina)	Valeria & Leandro	48 (7,X,5,7,/,7,7,8,8,7)	Hip-Hop	"Pump It" – The Black Eyed Peas
(Argentina)	Valeria & Leandro	62 (9,8,9,9,/,9,8,9,9,9)	On the Sand	"Isaac" – Madonna
(France)	Sevy & Máxime	57 (7,8,9,7,8,9,9,7,9,/)	Hip-Hop	"Technologic" – Daft Punk
(France)	Sevy & Máxime	53 (8,9,6,6,6,8,9,7,10,/)	On the Sand	"Wheater Storm" – Craig Armstrong
(United States)	Snejana & Paul	43 (7,5,7,6,6,7,4,6,/,6)	Hip-Hop	"American Boy" – Estelle
(United States)	Snejana & Paul	58 (9,9,9,8,7,9,7,8,/,8)	On the Sand	"Jai Ho" – The Pussycat Dolls

==== Dance Off's ====
Country	Team	Score	Style	Music	Winner
(Spain)	Raquel & Kim	57+2=59 (9,10,9,/,8,8,7,8,8,7)	Samba	"Swing Da Cor" – Daniela Mercury	Raquel & Kim
(France)	Sevy & Máxime	52 (7,8,8,7,7,8,9,7,7,/)	Samba	"Un Amor/Bamboleo" – Gipsy Kings	Raquel & Kim
(Romania)	Laura & Bogdan	49 (/,8,8,8,7,8,5,6,6,6)	Samba	"A Gustito" – Ketama	Snejana & Paul
(United States)	Snejana & Paul	66+2=68 (10,9,10,9,9,10,9,10,/,9)	Samba	"A Ritmo De Bom Bom" – Juvaba	Snejana & Paul
(Argentina)	Valeria & Leandro	49+2=51 (6,7,7,8,/,8,6,8,7,6)	Samba	"Mas Que Nada" – Sérgio Mendes	Valeria & Leandro
(Mexico)	Lis & Luis David	48 (5,7,8,8,6,/,6,7,8,6)	Samba	"Magalenha" – Sérgio Mendes	Valeria & Leandro

=== Week 8: Quarter-Finals ===
Individual judges scores in the chart below (given in parentheses) are listed in this order from left to right: Wilmark Rizzo, Rossana Lignarolo, Jonaid Carrera, Rafael Amargo, Hugo Gómez, Latin Lover, Stuart Bishop, Carolina Vigil, Nick Kosovich and Bérénice Bel.

The bold and italic numbers represent the highest and the lowest scores, which was cancelled from the final score.

/ means the judge of each country can't vote for him/her own country

Secret Score: Hugo Gómez (first round) & Jonaid Carrera (second round)

Running order

Country	Team	Score	Style	Music
(United States)	Snejana & Paul	57 (9,8,8,8,8,8,7,9,/,8)	Salsa en Línea	"Pelotero la Bola" – Hansel Y Raúl
(United States)	Snejana & Paul	67 (10,9,9,10,8,10,10,9,10)	Quickstep	"Sing, Sing, Sing" – Benny Goodman
(Argentina)	Valeria & Leandro	48 (7,6,7,7,/,7,8,7,6,7)	Salsa en Línea	"Arranca en Fa" – Sonora Carruseles
(Argentina)	Valeria & Leandro	58 (9,7,7,8,/,9,9,9,10,7)	Reggaeton	"Ella Se Arrebata" – Latin Fresh
(France)	Sevy & Máxime	44 (6,5,6,5,7,7,8,6,7,/)	Salsa en Línea	"Dame Cinco" – Mambomanía
(France)	Sevy & Máxime	57 (7,8,X,7,8,8,9,7,7,/)	Quickstep	"The Lady Is a Tramp" – Buddy Greco
(Romania)	Laura & Bogdan	38 (/,6,5,5,X,6,6,5,5,5)	Salsa en Línea	"Salsa Dura" – La Excelencia
(Romania)	Laura & Bogdan	45 (/,8,?,9,7,8,6,7,7,8)	Quickstep	"Hey Pachuco" – Royal Crown Revue
(Spain)	Raquel & Kim	59 (8,9,8,/,8,9,9,8,9,8)	Salsa en Línea	"Cachondea" – Fruko y sus Tesos
(Spain)	Raquel & Kim	48 (8,7,7,/,7,7,5,7,8,5)	Reggaeton	"Llamado de Emergencia" – Daddy Yankee
(Mexico)	Lis & Luis David	60 (10,8,7,8,9,/,9,8,9,9)	Salsa en Línea	"La Salsa la Traigo Yo" – Sonora Carruseles
(Mexico)	Lis & Luis David	47 (7,7,7,8,7,/,7,6,6,6)	Quickstep	"Dancin' Fool" – Barry Manilow

==== Dance Off's ====
Country	Team	Score	Style	Music	Winner
(France)	Sevy & Máxime	Reggaeton	43 (6,6,7,6,6,7,5,6,6,/)	"Lo Que Pasó, Pasó" – Daddy Yankee	Laura & Bogdan
(Romania)	Laura & Bogdan	Reggaeton	50+2=52 (/,7,8,8,7,8,5,6,7,7)	"Back It Up" – Sean Paul	Laura & Bogdan
(Spain)	Raquel & Kim	Quickstep	57+2=59 (8,8,8,/,8,9,8,9,8,6)	"Spotlight" – Christina Aguilera	Raquel & Kim
(Argentina)	Valeria & Leandro	Quickstep	50 (7,7,7,7,/,8,7,8,7,7)	"Diamonds Are a Girl's Best Friend" – Marilyn Monroe	Raquel & Kim
(United States)	Snejana & Paul	Reggaeton	46 (9,6,6,6,6,7,5,7,/,8)	"Rompe" – Daddy Yankee	Lis & Luis David
(Mexico)	Lis & Luis David	Reggaeton	55+2=57 (10,7,5,10,9,/,5,8,8,8)	"Drop It on Me" – Ricky Martin	Lis & Luis David

=== Week 9: Semi-Finals ===
Individual judges scores in the chart below (given in parentheses) are listed in this order from left to right: Rossana Lignarolo, Jonaid Carrera, Wilmark Rizzo, Hugo Gómez, Latin Lover, Stuart Bishop, Carolina Vigil, Nick Kosovich and Bérénice Bel.

The bold and italic numbers represent the highest and the lowest scores, which was cancelled from the final score.

/ means the judge of each country can't vote for him/her own country. (Note: Due to Rafael Amargo's absence, the eliminated votes for Spain were from: Latin Lover (first round), Stuart Bishop (second round) and Nick Kosovich (third round)).

Secret Score: Carolina Vigil

Running order

Country	Team	Score	Style	Music
(France)	Fauve & Máxime	0	Paso Doble	"Fire In A Brooklyn Theater" – from the movie Come See the Paradise
(France)	Fauve & Máxime	0	Ballroom Rumba	"Comptine d'un autre été : L'après-midi" – from the movie Amélie
(Argentina)	Valeria & Leandro	40 (6,7,7,/,8,8,6,6,6)	Ballroom Rumba	"Quando, Quando, Quando" – Michael Bublé & Nelly Furtado
(Argentina)	Valeria & Leandro	46 (7,6,8,/,8,7,8,8,8)	Flamenco Rumba	"Vamos A Bailar" – Gipsy Kings
(Argentina)	Valeria & Leandro	46 (6,7,8,/,8,7,8,9,8)	Tex Mex	"Azúcar" – Kumbia Kings
(Spain)	Raquel & Kim	45 (8,8,9,7,/,6,7,8,7)	Paso Doble	"The Black Pearl" – from the movie Pirates of the Caribbean: The Curse of the Black Pearl
(Spain)	Raquel & Kim	51 (9,8,9,8,9,/,9,8,7)	Ballroom Rumba	"Fields of Gold" – Sting
(Spain)	Raquel & Kim	42 (7,7,7,7,8,5,7,/,7)	Tex Mex	"Techno Cumbia" – Selena
(Mexico)	Lis & Luis David	43 (7,7,8,7,/,7,7,6,8)	Ballroom Rumba	"Sabor a Mí" – Luis Miguel
(Mexico)	Lis & Luis David	39 (7,6,6,7,/,6,X,8,7)	Flamenco Rumba	"Muchas Flores" – Rosario
(Mexico)	Lis & Luis David	50 (8,8,8,9,/,6,9,9,8)	Tex Mex	"Bidi Bidi Bom Bom" – Selena
(United States)	Snejana & Paul	53 (9,9,9,8,9,10,X,/,9)	Paso Doble	"Malagueña" – Connie Francis
(United States)	Snejana & Paul	54 (9,9,9,9,9,9,X,/,9)	Ballroom Rumba	"Mañana de Carnaval" – Luis Miguel
(United States)	Snejana & Paul	37 (6,6,6,6,7,5,X,/,6)	Tex Mex	"El chico del apartamento 512" – Selena

==== Turning Room Challenge ====
Country	Team	Style	Music	Votes To Win	Winner
(Argentina)	Valeria & Leandro	Freestyle	"Dancin' Dan" – from the musical Fosse	(South Africa) (Romania) (United Kingdom) (Peru) (United States) (France)	Valeria & Leandro
(Mexico)	Lis & Luis David	Freestyle	"Fever" – Michael Bublé	None	Valeria & Leandro
(United States)	Paul	Freestyle	"L-O-V-E" – Michael Bublé	None	Valeria & Leandro
(Spain)	Raquel & Kim	Freestyle	"Resident Evil Main Title Theme" – Marilyn Manson	(Colombia) (Argentina) (Mexico)	Valeria & Leandro

=== Week 10: Finals ===
Individual judges scores in the chart below (given in parentheses) are listed in this order from left to right: Rossana Lignarolo, Jonaid Carrera, Wilmark Rizzo, Hugo Gómez, Latin Lover, Stuart Bishop, Carolina Vigil, Nick Kosovich and Bérénice Bel.

The bold and italic numbers represent the highest and the lowest scores, which was cancelled from the final score.

/ means the judge of each country can't vote for him/her own country. (Note: Due to Rafael Amargo's absence, the eliminated votes for Spain were from Latin Lover).

Secret Score: Rossana Lignarolo

==== First round ====
Country	Team	Scores	Style	Music	Eliminated Couple
(United States)	Snejana & Paul	51 (8,9,9,8,9,8,8,/,9)	Ballroom Cha-Cha	"Watusi Boogaloo" – Tito Rodríguez	Lis & Luis David
(Mexico)	Lis & Luis David	36 (?,7,7,7,/,8,6,8,7)	Quebradita	"El Sonidito" – Banda MS	Lis & Luis David
(Spain)	Raquel & Kim	49 (X,8,8,8,/,7,9,8,8)	Waltz	"Fly Me to the Moon" – Tony Bennett	Lis & Luis David
(Argentina)	Valeria & Leandro	54 (8,9,9,/,10,10,8,9,9)	Acrobatic Lyrical	"Bohemian Rhapsody" – Queen	Lis & Luis David

==== Second round ====
Country	Team	Scores	Style	Music	Eliminated Couple
(Argentina)	Valeria & Leandro	47 (X,7,8,/,8,8,8,9,8)	Quebradita	"Que Bonita" – Banda el Recodo	Valeria & Leandro
(Spain)	Raquel & Kim	55 (X,10,10,8,/,7,10,9,8)	Ballroom Cha-Cha	"Sex Bomb" – Tom Jones	Valeria & Leandro
(United States)	Snejana & Paul	47 (X,7,9,8,8,8,8,/,8)	Acrobatic Lyrical	"Gravity" – John Mayer	Valeria & Leandro

==== Final Smackdown ====
Country	Team	Style	Music	Votes to win	Winner Couple
(Spain)	Raquel & Kim	Quebradita	"Vámonos de Fiesta" – Banda el Recodo	(Colombia)	Snejana & Paul
(Spain)	Raquel & Kim	Acrobatic Lyrical	"Hurt" – Christina Aguilera	(Colombia)	Snejana & Paul
(United States)	Snejana & Paul	Quebradita	"La Niña Fresa" – Banda Machos	(South Africa) (Romania) (Argentina) (Mexico) (United Kingdom) (Peru) (France)	Snejana & Paul
(United States)	Snejana & Paul	Waltz	"Open Arms" – Journey	(South Africa) (Romania) (Argentina) (Mexico) (United Kingdom) (Peru) (France)	Snejana & Paul

== Weekly Challenges ==
=== Michael Jackson Challenge ===
In Week 5, four of the male contestants were in a Dance-Off, where they performed Michael Jackson's famous songs. The winner awarded a trip for all his team to a spa in Valle de Bravo.

Round	Male Dancer	Music	Votes to win	Winner
1	(Peru) Kervin Valdizan	"Beat It" – Michael Jackson	(Argentina) (Mexico) (Peru)	Paul Barris; Luis David de los Ángeles
1	(United States) Paul Barris	"Bad" – Michael Jackson	(Romania) (Colombia) (South Africa) (Spain) (Peru) (United States) (France)	Paul Barris; Luis David de los Ángeles
1	(Mexico) Luis David de los Ángeles	"Billie Jean" – Michael Jackson	(Romania) (Colombia) (South Africa) (Spain) (Argentina) (Mexico) (United States) (France)	Paul Barris; Luis David de los Ángeles
1	(Spain) Kim Solé	"Smooth Criminal" – Michael Jackson	None	Paul Barris; Luis David de los Ángeles
1	(United Kingdom) Stuart Bishop (Judge)	"Billie Jean" – Michael Jackson	–	Paul Barris; Luis David de los Ángeles
2	(United States) Paul Barris	"Bad" – Michael Jackson	(South Africa) (Spain) (Mexico) (United Kingdom) (Peru) (United States)	Paul Barris
2	(Mexico) Luis David de los Ángeles	"Billie Jean" – Michael Jackson	(Romania) (Colombia) (Argentina) (France)	Paul Barris

=== Jennifer Lopez Little Train ===
In Week 6, all the six female contestants were in a Dance-Off, where they performed a Jennifer Lopez's famous song. The winner awarded a trip for all her team to a spa in Valle de Bravo

Round	Female Dancer	Music	Votes to win	Winner
1	(Mexico) Lis Vega	"Let's Get Loud" – Jennifer Lopez	(Romania) (Colombia) (Mexico)	Lis Vega; Delly Madrid; Sevy Villete^{12}
1	(Peru) Delly Madrid	"Let's Get Loud" – Jennifer Lopez	(South Africa) (United Kingdom) (Peru)	Lis Vega; Delly Madrid; Sevy Villete^{12}
1	(Spain) Raquel Ortega	"Let's Get Loud" – Jennifer Lopez	None	Lis Vega; Delly Madrid; Sevy Villete^{12}
1	(United States) Snejana Petrova	"Let's Get Loud" – Jennifer Lopez	None	Lis Vega; Delly Madrid; Sevy Villete^{12}
1	(Argentina) Valeria Archimo	"Let's Get Loud" – Jennifer Lopez	(Argentina)	Lis Vega; Delly Madrid; Sevy Villete^{12}
1	(France) Sevy Villette	"Let's Get Loud" – Jennifer Lopez	(Spain) (United States) (France)	Lis Vega; Delly Madrid; Sevy Villete^{12}

^12 Lis Vega, Delly Madrid and Sevy Villette obtained the same number of votes from the judges (3), so Nick Kosovich (American judge) had to choose the winner contestant. And he chose Sevy Villette

=== Ricky Martin Little Train ===
In Week 7, six of the seven male contestants were in a Dance-Off, where they performed a Ricky Martin's famous song. The winners awarded an extra-point added to their final score.

Round	Female Dancer	Music	Votes to win	Winner
1	(Mexico) Luis David de los Ángeles	"Pégate" – Ricky Martin	(Romania) (Colombia) (South Africa) (Spain) (Argentina) (Mexico) (Peru) (France)	Luis David de los Ángeles; Kervin Valdizan
1	(United States) Paul Barris	"Pégate" – Ricky Martin	(Romania) (France)	Luis David de los Ángeles; Kervin Valdizan
1	(Spain) Kim Solé	"Pégate" – Ricky Martin	None	Luis David de los Ángeles; Kervin Valdizan
1	(Argentina) Leandro Nimo	"Pégate" – Ricky Martin	(United Kingdom) (United States)	Luis David de los Ángeles; Kervin Valdizan
1	(France) Máxime Dereymez	"Pégate" – Ricky Martin	None	Luis David de los Ángeles; Kervin Valdizan
1	(Peru) Kervin Valdizan	"Pégate" – Ricky Martin	(Colombia) (South Africa) (Spain) (Argentina) (Mexico) (United Kingdom) (Peru) (United States)	Luis David de los Ángeles; Kervin Valdizan

=== Lady Gaga Little Train ===
In Week 7, six of the seven female contestants were in a Dance-Off, where they performed a Lady Gaga's famous song. The winners awarded an extra-point added to their final score.

Round	Female Dancer	Music	Votes to win	Winner
1	(Mexico) Lis Vega	"Bad Romance" – Lady Gaga	(Colombia) (Spain) (Mexico) (Peru) (United States) (France)	Lis Vega; Valeria Archimo^{13}
1	(United States) Snejana Petrova	"Bad Romance" – Lady Gaga	None	Lis Vega; Valeria Archimo^{13}
1	(Spain) Raquel Ortega	"Bad Romance" – Lady Gaga	(Romania) (Spain) (Argentina) (United States)	Lis Vega; Valeria Archimo^{13}
1	(Argentina) Valeria Archimo	"Bad Romance" – Lady Gaga	(Romania) (Argentina) (Mexico) (United Kingdom)	Lis Vega; Valeria Archimo^{13}
1	(France) Sevy Villette	"Bad Romance" – Lady Gaga	(Colombia) (South Africa) (France)	Lis Vega; Valeria Archimo^{13}
1	(Peru) Delly Madrid	"Bad Romance" – Lady Gaga	(South Africa) (United Kingdom) (Peru)	Lis Vega; Valeria Archimo^{13}

$\neg$ Raquel Ortega & Valeria Archimo were tied with four points from the judges, so Bérénice Bel (French Judge) had to choose the winner contestant. And she chose Valeria Archimo

=== Dance Marathon ===
In this challenge, each couple or each female contestant was paired with a male dancer, who isn't normally her partner in the championship. Then, each couple had to improvise the steps for the music that was being played. The winner couple awarded 2 extra-points (for each male/female dancer) added to their final score (in Week 9, the winner couple awarded 8 extra-points).

==== Week 8 ====
Place	Female Dancer	Male Dancer
1st	(Argentina) Valeria Archimo	(Romania) Bogdan Boantă
2nd	(United States) Snejana Petrova	(Spain) Kim Solé
2nd	(France) Sevy Villette	(United States) Paul Barris
4th	(Mexico) Lis Vega	(Argentina) Leandro Nimo
5th	(Spain) Raquel Ortega	(France) Máxime Dereymez
6th	(Romania) Laura Cosoi	(Mexico) Luis David de los Ángeles

==== Week 9 ====
Place	Country	Couple
1st	Mexico	Lis Vega & Luis David de los Ángeles
2nd	Argentina	Valeria Archimo & Leandro Nimo
3rd	Spain	Raquel Ortega & Kim Solé
4th	USA	Snejana Petrova & Paul Barris

== Yuri Challenge ==
In Week 5, Yuri announced she's gonna dance against celebrities in several Dance-Offs. The winner couple of each Dance-Off had to dance again in a Final Smackdown, to compete to win $150,000.

Week	Team	Style	Music	Winner
5	Yuri	Salsa	"Arranca en Fa" – Sonora Carruseles	–
6	Yuri & Ernesto D'Alessio	Merengue	"La Faldita" – Coco Band	Yuri & Ernesto D'Alessio
6	Irán Castillo & Eduardo Patraka	Rock and Roll	Rock Around The Clock – Bill Haley & His Comets	Yuri & Ernesto D'Alessio
7	Maya Karuna & Romeo López	Salsa	"Salsa de Tomate" – Celia Cruz & Tito Puente	Yurem & Ana María Acosta
7	Yurem & Ana María Acosta	Hip Hop/Cumbia	"Get Busy" – Sean Paul	Yurem & Ana María Acosta
9	Sergio Mayer & Karla Díaz	Merengue	"La Nalgadita" – Oro Sólido	Violeta Isfel & Enrique Barrera
9	Violeta Isfel & Enrique Barrera	Salsa	"Señor Sereno" – Ismael Miranda	Violeta Isfel & Enrique Barrera
10 Final	Violeta Isfel & Enrique Barrera	Freestyle; Turning Room	"The Phantom of the Opera" – from the musical The Phantom of the Opera	Yuri & Ernesto D'Alessio
10 Final	Yuri & Ernesto D'Alessio	Merengue	"La Reina del Swing" – Los Hermanos Rosario	Yuri & Ernesto D'Alessio
10 Final	Yurem & Ana María Acosta	Freestyle; Turning Room	"I've Got The Power" – Snap!	Yuri & Ernesto D'Alessio

== Kids Challenge ==
In Week 5, Yuri announced there will be a special competition for kids, to demonstrate how well they can dance. The competition was divided in two categories: Sub-15 (from 11 to 15 years old) and Sub-10 (from 7 to 10 years old). The winner in each category awarded $50,000.

Week	Team	Style	Music	Winner
5	Lorena & Andrés	Salsa	"Procura" – Chichí Peralta	–
6	Nicole (11) & Rubén (14)	Salsa/Disco	"Sobreviviendo" – Celia Cruz/"Hush Hush" – "The Pussycat Dolls"	Nicole & Ruben; Jaqueline y Gerardo
6	Jaqueline (10) & Gerardo (11)	Samba	"Black Machine" – Jazz Machine	Nicole & Ruben; Jaqueline y Gerardo
7	Azul (8) & Ivan (13)	Lindy Hop	"Americano" – The Brian Setzer Orchestra	Estefania & Fernando
7	Estefania (10) & Fernando (12)	Hip Hop	"Drop It Low" – Ester Dean featuring Chris Brown	Estefania & Fernando
8	Dalia & Julio	Salsa	"La Malanga" – Eddie Palmieri	Dalia & Julio
8	Viviana & Carlos	Salsa	"Bongo Festeris" – Eddie Cano	Dalia & Julio
8	Montserrat & Erick	Samba	"El Apagón" – Yuri	Darina & Jorge
8	Darina & Jorge	Salsa	"Yo Soy Guaguancó" – Frank "El Pavo" Hernández	Darina & Jorge
9	Mariza (13) & Adrián (15)	Merengue	"El Pollo" – Amarfis y su Banda de Atakke	Mariza & Adrián
9	Jessica (13) & David (15)	Salsa	"Luz del Cielo" – Nelson Feliciano	Mariza & Adrián
9	Anahí (15) & Rodrigo (15)	Salsa	"La Pelota" – Ray Barretto	Margarita & Vitaly
9	Margarita (13) & Vitaly (14)	Jive	"Hafanana" – Afric Simone	Margarita & Vitaly
10 Final	Dalia & Julio	Merengue	"El Chicharrón" – Oro Sólido	Lorena & Andrés
10 Final	Maritza & Adrián	Hip Hop	"Take the Lead (Wanna Ride)" – from the movie Take the Lead	Lorena & Andrés
10 Final	Margarita & Vitali	Ballroom Cha-Cha	"Todo, Todo, Todo" – Daniela Romo	Lorena & Andrés
10 Final	Lorena & Andrés	Salsa	"Ran Kan Kan" – Tito Puente	Lorena & Andrés
10 Final	Nicole & Rubén	Samba	"Quimbara" – Celia Cruz	Lorena & Andrés
10 Final	Estefanía & Fernando	Hip Hop	"Chiquitere" – Rafa Villalba featuring DJ Sarna	Estefanía & Fernando
10 Final	Darina & Jorge	Hip Hop	"Egoísta" – Belinda featuring Pitbull	Estefanía & Fernando
10 Final	Karla & Gerardo	Ballroom Cha-Cha	"Let's Get Loud (Jennifer Lopez song)" – Jennifer Lopez	Estefanía & Fernando
