= Delly Madrid =

Peruvian reality television contestant, model and dancer

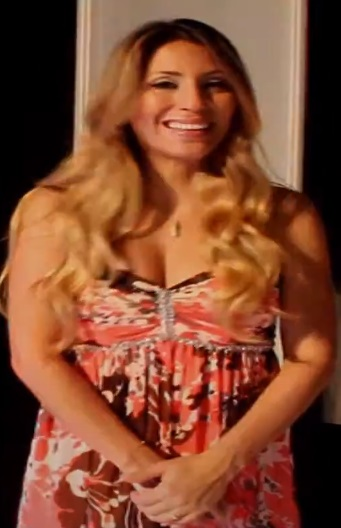
- Delly Madrid in 2015
- Born: Delly Madrid Arana; April 29, 1979 (age 46); Lima, Peru
- Occupations: Model, dancer, TV host and entrepreneur
- Modeling information
- Height: 1.75 m (5 ft 9 in)
- Hair color: Blonde
- Eye color: Brown

Delly Madrid (born April 29, 1979) is a Peruvian reality television contestant, model and dancer. She became a model in Punta del Este.

In 2008, she won fourth place in the second season of the Peruvian version of Bailando por un Sueño and won the spin-off, Reyes del. Her prizes were 200,000 dollars and a participation in the Second Dance World Championship.
