= Hermanos Yaipén =

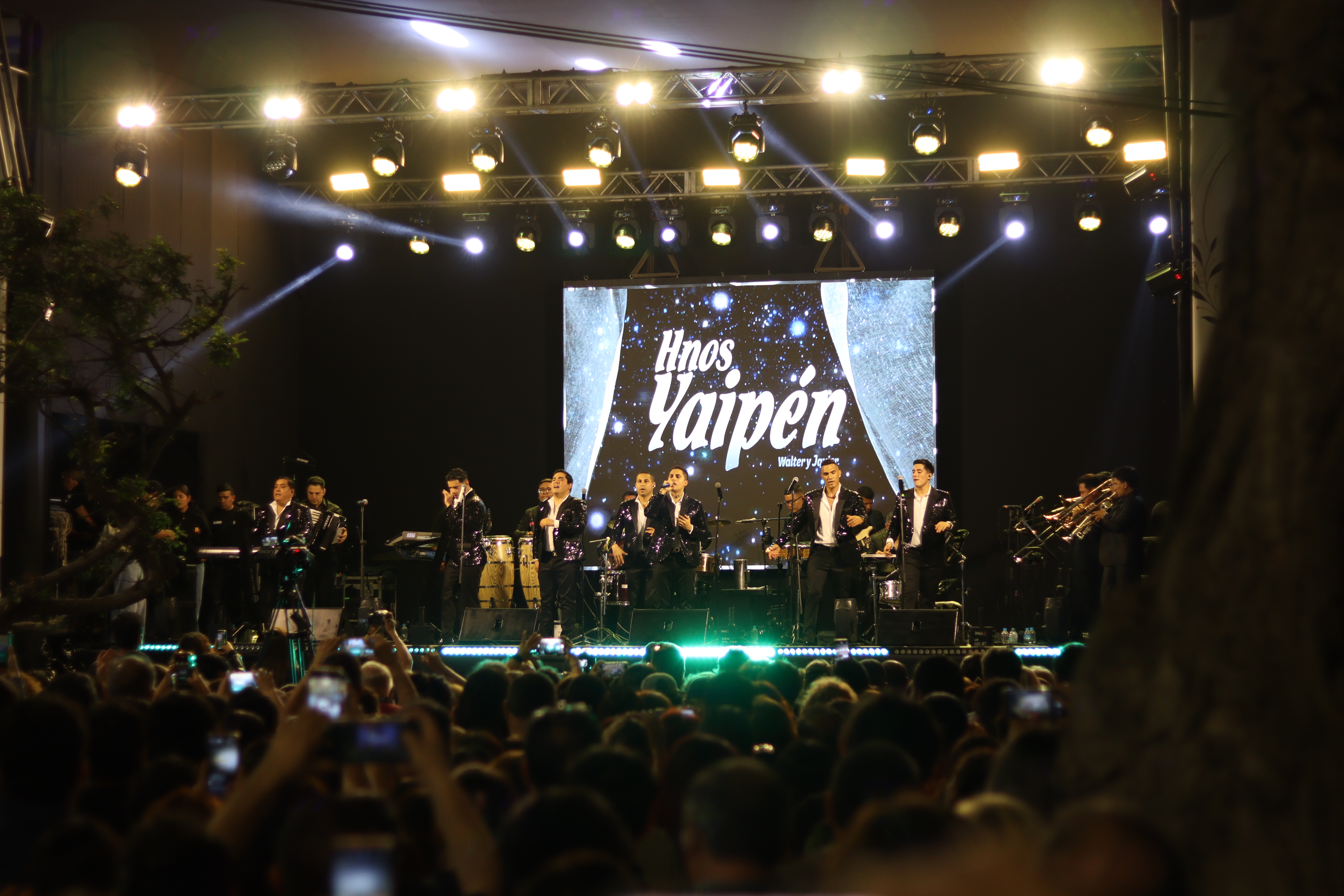
- Hermanos Yaipén in 2026.

Background information
- Origin: Peru
- Genres: Cumbia
- Years active: 2000 - present
- Label: BMG
- Members: Walter Yaipén; Javier Yaipén; Christian Dominguez; Moisés Vega; Jonathan Rojas; Angello Fuckuy

Yaipén Brothers (Spanish: Hermanos Yaipén) is an awarded Peruvian cumbia music group, founded by Walter and Javier Yaipén Brothers.

The group has been awarded several times since 2008, amidst them APDAYC Awards and International Award for "Best Cumbia Group".

== Singles ==
- "Largate"
- "Ojalá que te mueras"
- "A llorar a otra parte"
- "Corazón Partío"
- "Una rosa lo sabe"
- "Humíllate"
- "Niña Prohibida"
