= Oro Solido =

American merengue group

- Origin: Dominican Republic
- Genres: Merengue
- Years active: 1994–present
- Members: Raul Acosta; Angel Suriña; Raymond Aponte
- Website: www.orosolidoworld.com

Oro Solido (Spanish for "Solid Gold") is a New York–based merengue group. Oro Solido has sold several albums, reaching household name status. Their music has been featured on film as well as being played on tropical music stations since 1995.

== Early beginnings ==
Oro Solido, a Dominican band founded in 1993 was formed by Raul Acosta, who has received the nickname 'El Presidente'. Acosta was born in Santo Domingo, Dominican Republic on September 8, 1971. Born into a musical family, at the age of seven, he and his older brothers Iván and Rafael, in addition to local neighborhood kids, started a pre-adolescent music group called "Los Sobrinos Del Rey" a Dominican attempt version of the Jackson 5. With this early experience, Raul was able to develop his musical talent as well as his stage presence. The group went on to perform in two nationally televised shows on the government TV station, channel four, for a show called "Amarillis con los Niños.” At 9 years old, the family relocated to the United States. With no English skills, Raul moved to Jersey City, New Jersey, to start his new life. Years later, he moved to Union City where the Hispanic culture was growing stronger.

Upon graduating from Emerson High School, Raúl began his studies in music and sound engineering by joining Kennedy's Music World, a local music studio, school, and store, where he met a teacher named Kennedy Cortina. Kennedy taught him just about everything he knows, and planted the seed of music in his mind. There he worked retail and operated the music studio as well as helped students in their classes. In 1990, after graduating high school, he held different positions within the Hudson County government.

== Rise to stardom ==
In 1994, Acosta formed the merengue band Oro Sólido. That same year, he released his self-titled debut album, 'Oro Sólido'.

He continued to release albums approximately every year after that. With hits like "Ta Cache," "La Tanguita Roja," "Maria se Fue," "El Baile del Beeper," "Una Nalgadita," "La Morena," among others, Oro Sólido, positioned itself as one of the biggest Latin music groups in the world. They have surpassed various barriers when it comes to performing in the Anglo media and having their music played on English-speaking radio stations. Raul Acosta has been nominated for and won numerous awards throughout the years, including Premios Estrella, Premios ACE and Premios Lo Nuestro.

The group has performed regularly on some of Hispanic TV’s most distinguished and popular TV shows. Oro Sólido was also the first merengue band to perform on Fox 5 News New York and the Jerry Lewis Telethon. Also, he performed on the inauguration of President George W. Bush's second term in the Constitution Hall in Washington D.C.

The group has also performed five times in Madison Square Garden as well as other famous arenas like the Universal City Amphitheater in Los Angeles, the Zócalo square in Mexico City, Estadio Modelo in Ecuador, El Monumento in Dominican Republic, and the New Jersey Meadowlands. The group has shared the stage with artists such as 50 Cent, LeAnn Rimes, Celia Cruz, Marc Anthony, Fat Joe, Johnny Ventura, Wilfrido Vargas, Tito Puente, El Gran Combo and The Temptations.

Currently, Raul Acosta and Oro Solido are celebrating their 20th anniversary and are touring across the United States, Central, and South America. At present, Raul Acosta resides with his band in Miami, Florida, with other band members Angel Suriña and Raymond Aponte.

== Philanthropy ==
Oro Sólido also does benefit work with different organizations which include World Vision, March of Dimes, the Wheelchair Foundation, Health Plus, Verizon and the City of New York's Commission of Domestic Violence.

== Other markets ==
Oro Sólido is affiliated to companies such as Supercanal Caribe, a growing Latin cable station in the U.S. and Dominican Republic. The group has also launched their own Oro Sólido Long Distance Phone Card.

== Discography ==
- Oro Solido (1994)
- Y Sigue el Cache (1995)
- Internacional (1996)
- El Poder de New York (1997)
- El Presidente del Merengue (1998)
- 5th Anniversario (1999)
- Best of the Best (2000)
- Planeta Solido (2002)
- Party Time, Pt. 1 (2004)
- Fantasia Urbana (2008)
- Merenguefit (2011)
- El Pum (Single) (2014)
- El Congreso del Merengue (2015)
- En Vivo Desde Miami (2017)
- Live From NY (2017)
- Live From Santiago Dominican Republic (2017)
- Live! From Washington Heights (2017)
- Solid Gold (2019)
- YO No Me Caso (2020)
- Electronic Dance Reggae (2020)
- Festival En La Calle 8 (2020)
