= El Gran Show season 13 =

El Gran Show
- Season 13
- Hosted by: Gisela Valcárcel; Aldo Díaz; Francisco "Paco" Bazán; Jaime "Choca" Mandros
- Judges: Morella Petrozzi; Pachi Valle Riestra; Carlos Cacho
- Celebrity winner: Ismael La Rosa
- Professional winner: Michelle Vallejos
- No. of episodes: 13

Release
- Original network: América Televisión
- Original release: August 8 – October 31, 2015

Season chronology
- ← Previous; Season 12 Next → Season 14

Season two of the 2015 edition of El Gran Show premiered on August 8, 2015.

In this season the format of professional dancers returned instead of dreamers. In addition, this was the first season to cancel a live show, as there was a fire on the set, forcing production to cancel the broadcast.

On October 31, 2015, actor Ismael La Rosa and Michelle Vallejos were declared the winners, actor and singer Erick Elera and Andrea Huapaya finished second, while singer Milena Zárate and Anselmo Pedraza finished third.

== Cast ==
=== Couples ===
The 12 celebrities were presented on August 1, 2015, during the finals of last season, while the professional dancers were presented during the first week.

During the show, two celebrities left the competition. The first was the actress Alessandra Denegri, who withdraw due to an injury, so she was replaced by reality TV star, Chris Soifer. The second was the cumbia singer Marisol Ramírez, who withdraw the competition due to an injury, being replaced by the eliminated celebrity, Xoana González, being the first time that a previously eliminated celebrity takes the place of another.

Celebrity	Notability (known for)	Professional partner	Status	Ref.
Olinda Castañeda	Model & reality TV star	Patricio Quiñones	Eliminated 1st on August 22, 2015	
Laura Spoya	Model & Miss Peru 2015	Alfonso Ichunguza	Eliminated 2nd on August 29, 2015	
Carlos "Coto" Hernández	Model & reality TV star	Laura Pérez	Eliminated 3rd on September 19, 2015	
Xoana González	Model & reality TV star	George Neyra; Gustavo Rivera (week 1)	Eliminated 4th on September 19, 2015	
Sofía Franco	TV host	Andrés Izquierdo Henzler	Eliminated 5th on September 26, 2015	
Andrés "Chibolín" Hurtado	Showman, comedian & TV host	Mariale Pineda	Eliminated 6th on October 3, 2015	
Xoana González	Model & reality TV star	Jorge Valcárcel	Eliminated 7th on October 17, 2015	
Chris Soifer	Reality TV star	Raúl Romero	Eliminated 8th on October 24, 2015	
Alejandro "Zumba" Benítez	Reality TV star	Malory Vargas	Eliminated 9th on October 31, 2015	
Milena Zárate	Singer	Anselmo Pedraza	Third place on October 31, 2015	
Erick Elera	Al Fondo Hay Sitio actor & singer	Andrea Huapaya	Runner-up on October 31, 2015	
Ismael La Rosa	Actor	Michelle Vallejos	Winners on October 31, 2015	

=== Hosts and judges ===
Gisela Valcárcel, Aldo Díaz, Paco Bazán returned as hosts, while Morella Petrozzi, Carlos Cacho, Pachi Valle Riestra and the VIP Jury returned as judges. Bazán withdrew from the show due to personal issues, being replaced by Jaime "Choca" Mandros (former contestant of the season 1 of 2013).

== Scoring charts ==
Couple	Place	1	2	3	4	5	6 (Note: Due to the fire that occurred during week 6, most of the couples did not perform their dance. Sentenced couples were automatically saved but they still faced each other in the following week.)	7	8	9	10	11	12	13 (Note: In this week, the dances was not scored because the winner was chosen by the votes of the public.)	
Couple	Place	1	2	3	4	5	6	7	8	9	10	11	12	Top 4	Top 3
Ismael & Michelle	1	31	28	33	33	34	—	35	36	35	35	38	37	Safe	Winners
Erick & Andrea	2	29	33	30	32	33	30	34	36	34	37	37	35	Safe	Runner-up
Milena & Anselmo	3	31	32	32	33	35	—	32	34	36	36	33	38	Safe	Third place
Zumba & Malory	4	32	35	36	34	33	36	37	34	32	35	37	34	Eliminated	
Chris & Raúl	5	29	35	33	32	33	—	35	36	34	33	36	35		
Xoana & Jorge	6	29	34	31	30	33	33	31	31	30	34	30			
Chibolín & Mariale	7	29	30	35	29	37	—	34	30	41					
Sofía & Andrés	8	29	32	30	30	31	35	32	32						
Xoana & George	9	28	33	30	34	29	—	33							
Coto & Laura	10	31	34	30	31	31	—	31							
Laura & Alfonso	11	28	32	30	27										
Olinda & Patricio	12	26	29	27											

Red numbers indicate the sentenced for each week
Green numbers indicate the best steps for each week
the couple was eliminated that week
the couple was safe in the duel
the couple was eliminated that week and safe with a lifeguard
the winning couple
the runner-up couple
the third-place couple

=== Average score chart ===
This table only counts dances scored on a 40-point scale.

Rank by average	Place	Couple	Total points	Number of dances	Average
1	4	Zumba & Malory	412	12	34.3
2	1	Ismael & Michelle	372	11	33.8
3	3	Milena & Anselmo	370	11	33.6
4	5	Chris & Raúl	368	11	33.5
5	2	Erick & Andrea	396	12	33.0
6	7	Chibolín & Mariale	263	8	32.9
7	6	Xoana & Jorge	345	11	31.4
7	8	Sofía & Andrés	251	8	31.4
9	10	Coto & Laura	188	6	31.3
10	9	Xoana & George	187	6	31.2
11	11	Laura & Alfonso	117	4	29.3
12	12	Olinda & Patricio	82	3	27.3

=== Highest and lowest scoring performances ===
The best and worst performances in each dance according to the judges' 40-point scale are as follows:

Dance	Highest scored dancer(s)	Highest score	Lowest scored dancer(s)	Lowest score
Pachanga	Alejandro "Zumba" Benítez; Erick Elera	32	Olinda Castañeda	26
Cumbia	Ismael La Rosa; Marisol Ramírez	33	Olinda Castañeda	27
Latin pop	Andrés "Chibolín" Hurtado	37	Carlos "Coto" Hernández; Xoana González; Marisol Ramírez	30
Rock and roll	Ismael La Rosa	28	—	—
Salsa	Ismael La Rosa	36	Xoana González	29
Disco	Alejandro "Zumba" Benítez	35	—	—
Jazz	Alejandro "Zumba" Benítez	36	Olinda Castañeda	29
Axé	Milena Zárate	32	—	—
Reggaeton	Xoana González	34	Laura Spoya	27
Hip-hop	Milena Zárate	37	Carlos "Coto" Hernández	34
Merengue	Alessandra Denegri	35	Alessandra Denegri	32
Contemporary	Erick Elera; Xoana González	33	Carlos "Coto" Hernández	31
Samba	Andrés "Chibolín" Hurtado	39	Sofía Franco	31
World dances	Alejandro "Zumba" Benítez	36	Erick Elera	30
Double dance	Ismael La Rosa	37	Marisol Ramírez	31
Cha-cha-cha	Erick Elera; Ismael La Rosa; Alessandra Denegri	36	Andrés "Chibolín" Hurtado	30
Marinera	Marisol Ramírez	30	—	—
Jive	Milena Zárate; Erick Elera	35	Chris Soifer	32
Bollywood	Alejandro "Zumba" Benítez	35	—	—
Tango	Xoana González	32	—	—
Festejo	Chris Soifer	36	—	—

=== Couples' highest and lowest scoring dances ===
Scores are based upon a potential 40-point maximum.

Couples	Highest scoring dance(s)	Lowest scoring dance(s)
Ismael & Michelle	Merengue/Quebradita (37)	Rock and roll (28)
Erick & Andrea	Cha-cha-cha (36)	Pachanga (29)
Milena & Anselmo	Hip-hop (37)	Cumbia (31)
Zumba & Malory	Jazz, Bachata & Waltz/Cumbia (36)	Pachanga & Latin pop (32)
Chris & Raúl	Cha-cha-cha & Festejo (36)	Cumbia (29)
Xoana & Jorge	Salsa (34)	Cumbia (29)
Chibolín & Mariale	Samba (39)	Cumbia & Pachanga (29)
Sofía & Andrés	Hip-hop (35)	Cumbia (29)
Xoana & George	Reggaeton (34)	Pachanga (28)
Coto & Laura	Hip-hop (34)	Cumbia & Latin pop (30)
Laura & Alfonso	Jazz (32)	Reggaeton (27)
Olinda & Patricio	Jazz (29)	Pachanga (26)

== Weekly scores ==
Individual judges' scores in the charts below (given in parentheses) are listed in this order from left to right: Morella Petrozzi, Carlos Cacho, Pachi Valle Riestra, VIP Jury.

=== Week 1: First Dances ===
The couples danced cumbia or pachanga.

Running order

Couple	Scores	Dance	Music	Result
Erick & Andrea	29 (7, 6, 7, 9)	Pachanga	"Danza Kuduro"—Don Omar / "Rap das Armas"—Cidinho and Doca	Safe
Marisol & Jorge	29 (7, 7, 7, 8)	Cumbia	"Esta Noche"—Orquesta Candela	Safe
Laura & Alfonso	28 (7, 6, 7, 8)	Pachanga	"Inténtalo"—3Ball MTY / "Cumbia Tribalera"—El Pelón del Mikrophone	Sentenced
Xoana & Gustavo	28 (6, 7, 7, 8)	Pachanga	"Bailan Rochas y Chetas"—Nene Malo	Sentenced
Zumba & Malory	32 (7, 8, 8, 9)	Pachanga	"La Noche Está de Fiesta"—J-King & Maximan	Best steps
Sofía & Andrés	29 (7, 7, 7, 8)	Cumbia	"Ámame"—Amaya Hermanos	Safe
Chibolín & Mariale	29 (7, 7, 8, 7)	Cumbia	"El Estúpido"—Corazón Serrano	Safe
Alessandra & Raúl	29 (7, 8, 7, 7)	Cumbia	"Dos Locos"—Los ViIlacorta	Safe
Olinda & Patricio	26 (7, 7, 6, 6)	Pachanga	"Envidia" / "El Ombligo"—Las Culisueltas	Sentenced
Ismael & Michelle	31 (8, 7, 7, 9)	Pachanga	"La Mordidita"—Ricky Martin	Safe
Milena & Anselmo	31 (8, 8, 7, 8)	Cumbia	"Ya Te Olvidé"—Armonía 10	Safe
Coto & Laura	31 (8, 8, 7, 8)	Cumbia	"Qué Pasó"—Sonido 2000	Safe

=== Week 2: The Dance That I Do Not Master ===
The couples (except those sentenced) performed one unlearned dance which each celebrity chose as the most complicated to perform.

Due to work issues, Marisol Ramírez was unable to perform, so singer Vernis Hernández replaced her.

Running order

Couple	Scores	Dance	Music	Result
Sofía & Andrés	32 (8, 8, 8, 8)	Latin pop	"Follow the Leader"—Wisin & Yandel feat. Jennifer Lopez	Safe
Ismael & Michelle	28 (7, 6, 7, 8)	Rock and roll	"Jailhouse Rock"—Elvis Presley	Sentenced
Vernis & Jorge	34 (9, 8, 8, 9)	Salsa	"Ven Morena"—Oscar D'León	Safe
Zumba & Malory	35 (8, 9, 9, 9)	Disco	"El Lute / Gotta Go Home"—Boney M.	Best steps
Laura & Alfonso	32 (8, 8, 8, 8)	Jazz*	"All that Jazz"—Liza Minnelli	Safe
Olinda & Patricio	29 (8, 7, 7, 7)	Jazz*	"Lady Marmalade"—Christina Aguilera, Lil' Kim, Mýa & Pink	Sentenced
Xoana & George	33 (8, 8, 8, 9)	Jazz*	"Show Me How You Burlesque"—Christina Aguilera	Safe
Milena & Anselmo	32 (8, 8, 8, 8)	Axé	"Danza do Vampiro"—Axé Bahia	Safe
Chibolín & Mariale	30 (8, 6, 8, 8)	Reggaeton	"Candy"—Plan B	Safe
Coto & Laura	34 (10, 8, 8, 8)	Hip-hop	"Watch Out for This (Bumaye)"—Major Lazer	Safe
Alessandra & Raúl	35 (9, 9, 8, 9)	Merengue	"Rompecintura"—Los Hermanos Rosario	Safe
Erick & Andrea	33 (9, 7, 8, 9)	Contemporary	"Try"—Pink	Safe

=== Week 3: Characterization Night ===
The couples (except those sentenced) performed one unlearned dance being characterized to popular music icons.

Running order

Couple	Scores	Dance	Music	Characterization	Result
Coto & Laura	30 (7, 8, 7, 8)	Latin pop	"She Bangs"—Ricky Martin	Ricky Martin	Safe
Milena & Anselmo	32 (8, 9, 7, 8)	Latin pop	"Te Aviso, Te Anuncio (Tango)"—Shakira	Shakira	Safe
Marisol & Jorge	31 (8, 8, 7, 8)	Latin pop	"Hay que venir al sur"—Raffaella Carrà	Raffaella Carrà	Safe
Zumba & Malory	36 (10, 9, 8, 9)	Jazz	"Beat It"—Michael Jackson	Michael Jackson	Best steps
Olinda & Patricio	27 (7, 8, 6, 6)	Cumbia*	"Pecadora"—Grupo Néctar		—
Ismael & Michelle	33 (9, 8, 7, 9)	Cumbia*	"El Arbolito"—Grupo Néctar		Safe
Laura & Alfonso	30 (7, 8, 7, 8)	Jazz	"Oops!... I Did It Again"—Britney Spears	Britney Spears	Sentenced
Erick & Andrea	30 (7, 7, 7, 9)	Reggaeton	"Bon, Bon"—Pitbull	Pitbull	Safe
Chibolín & Mariale	35 (10, 9, 8, 8)	Salsa	"Quimbara"—Celia Cruz & Johnny Pacheco	Celia Cruz	Safe
Sofía & Andrés	30 (7, 8, 7, 8)	Jazz	"Hung Up"—Madonna	Madonna	Sentenced
Xoana & George	30 (7, 8, 7, 8)	Latin pop	"Y Yo Sigo Aquí"—Paulina Rubio	Paulina Rubio	Sentenced
Alessandra & Raúl	33 (8, 8, 8, 9)	Latin pop	"Arrasando"—Thalía	Thalía	Safe

=== Week 4: The 90's Night ===
The couples (except those sentenced) performed one unlearned dance to famous '90s songs.

Running order

Couple	Scores	Dance	Music	Result
Erick & Andrea	32 (8, 8, 8, 8)	Pachanga	"Sopa de Caracol"—Banda Blanca	Safe
Marisol & Jorge	30 (8, 7, 7, 8)	Latin pop	"El Apagón"—Yuri	Sentenced
Milena & Anselmo	33 (9, 8, 8, 8)	Merengue	"La Ventanita"—Sergio Vargas	Safe
Laura & Alfonso	27 (7, 7, 6, 7)	Reggaeton*	"Pasarela"—Daddy Yankee	—
Sofía & Andrés	30 (8, 7, 7, 8)	Reggaeton*	"Choca"—Plan B	Sentenced
Xoana & George	34 (10, 8, 8, 8)	Reggaeton*	"El Choque"—Mr. Saik	Best steps
Chibolín & Mariale	29 (8, 6, 7, 8)	Pachanga	"La Chica Ye-Ye"—Concha Velasco	Sentenced
Zumba & Malory	34 (10, 8, 8, 8)	Merengue	"Zúmbalo"—Los Melódicos	Best steps
Coto & Laura	31 (8, 8, 7, 8)	Latin pop	"Fiesta En América"—Chayanne	Safe
Ismael & Michelle	33 (9, 6, 9, 9)	Merengue	"La Bilirrubina"—Juan Luis Guerra	Safe
Alessandra & Raúl	32 (8, 8, 8, 8)	Merengue	"Everybody Dancing Now"—Lisa M	Safe

=== Week 5: Salsa Night ===
The couples (except those sentenced) danced salsa.

Running order

Couple	Scores	Dance	Music	Result
Ismael & Michelle	34 (9, 8, 8, 9)	Salsa	"La Fiesta del Pilito"—El Gran Combo de Puerto Rico	Safe
Milena & Anselmo	35 (9, 9, 9, 8)	Salsa	"El Preso"—Fruko y sus Tesos	Safe
Zumba & Malory	33 (8, 9, 8, 8)	Salsa	"La Salsa Vive"—Tito Nieves	Safe
Coto & Laura	31 (8, 8, 7, 8)	Salsa	"La Rebelión"—Joe Arroyo	Sentenced
Marisol & Jorge	33 (9, 9, 7, 8)	Cumbia*	"Ya Se Marchó"—Marisol y La Magia del Norte	Safe
Sofía & Andrés	31 (8, 8, 7, 8)	Samba*	"Melô do Tchaco"—É o Tchan!	Sentenced
Chibolín & Mariale	37 (10, 10, 8, 9)	Latin pop*	"María Mercedes"—Thalía	Best steps
Xoana & George	29 (7, 8, 7, 7)	Salsa	"Mi Gente"—Héctor Lavoe	Sentenced
Erick & Andrea	33 (9, 8, 8, 8)	Salsa	"En Barranquilla Me Quedo"—Joe Arroyo	Safe
Alessandra & Raúl	33 (9, 8, 7, 8)	Salsa	"Quimbombo"—Hermanos Moreno	Safe

=== Week 6: World Dances Night ===
The couples (except those sentenced) performed the world dances.

Due to a fire produced during the performance of Coto & Laura, the production decided to cancel the live show. For this reason, the rest of the couples did not danced. It was decided that the elimination between the sentenced couples will be determined next week and that all couples would perform new dances.

Running order

Couple	Scores	Dance	Music
Marisol & Jorge	33 (9, 8, 8, 8)	(United States) Country	"Timber"—Pitbull feat. Kesha
Zumba & Malory	36 (10, 8, 9, 9)	(Dominican Republic) Bachata	"Darte un Beso"—Prince Royce
Erick & Andrea	30 (7, 7, 7, 9)	(Brazil) Lambada	"Taboo"—Don Omar
Sofía & Andrés	35 (9, 9, 9, 8)	Hip-hop*	"Lose My Breath"—Destiny's Child
Coto & Laura	N/A	Hip-hop*	"Run the World (Girls)"—Beyoncé
Xoana & George	N/A	Hip-hop*	"Naughty Girl"—Beyoncé
Alessandra & Raúl	N/A	(South Korea) K-pop	"I Am the Best"—2NE1
Chibolín & Mariale	N/A	(Peru) Festejo	"Chacombo"—Arturo "Zambo" Cavero
Ismael & Michelle	N/A	(Spain) Paso doble	"España cañí"—Pascual Marquina Narro
Milena & Anselmo	N/A	(India) Bollywood	"Jai Ho! (You Are My Destiny)"—A. R. Rahman & The Pussycat Dolls

=== Week 7: Double Dance Night ===
The couples (except those sentenced) performed a double dance. In the versus, only two couples faced dancing jazz, the winner would take two extra points plus the couples who gave their support votes.

Running order

Couple	Scores	Dance	Music	Result
Marisol & Jorge	31 (9, 7, 7, 8)	Salsa; Rock and roll	"Gozando en la Habana"—La Charanga Habanera "Tutti Frutti"—Little Richard	Sentenced
Milena & Anselmo	32 (9, 8, 8, 7)	Contemporary; Quebradita	"Diamonds"—Rihanna "La Quebradora"—Banda el Recodo	Sentenced
Chibolín & Mariale	34 (10, 8, 8, 8)	Jazz; Festejo	"Believe"—Cher "Chacombo"—Arturo "Zambo" Cavero	Safe
Zumba & Malory	36 (10, 10, 8, 8)	Waltz; Cumbia	"Tiempo de Vals"—Chayanne "Elsa"—Agua Bella	Best steps
Coto & Laura	31 (8, 8, 7, 8)	Contemporary*	"Hoy Tengo Ganas de Ti"—Alejandro Fernández feat. Christina Aguilera	—
Sofía & Andrés	32 (8, 8, 8, 8)	Contemporary*	"La Usurpadora"—Pandora	Sentenced
Xoana & George	33 (9, 8, 8, 8)	Contemporary*	"La Descarada"—Reyli	—
Alessandra & Raúl	35 (9, 8, 9, 9)	Reggaeton; Cumbia	"Quema, Quema"—Aldo & Dandy "Una Rafaga De Amor"—Ráfaga	Safe
Ismael & Michelle	35 (9, 9, 8, 9)	Merengue; Disco	"Abusadora"—Wilfrido Vargas "Stayin' Alive"—Bee Gees	Safe
Erick & Andrea	34 (9, 8, 8, 9)	Hip-hop; Tex-mex	"Party Rock Anthem"—LMFAO "El Chico del Apartamento 512"—Selena	Safe

The versus
Couple (Supports)	Judges' votes	Dance	Music	Result
Zumba & Malory (Coto)	Zumba, Zumba, Zumba	Jazz	"Bésame"—Juan Gabriel	Winners (1 pt)
Chibolín & Mariale (Sofía, Milena, Alessandra, Xoana, Marisol, Ismael, Erick)	Zumba, Zumba, Zumba	Jazz	"Eco" / "La Banda de Hola Yola" / "El Merenguito"—Yola Polastri	Losers

=== Week 8: Trio Cha-cha-cha Night ===
The couples (except those sentenced) danced a trio cha-cha-cha involving another celebrity.

Running order

Couple (Trio Dance Partner)	Scores	Dance	Music	Result
Zumba & Malory (Natalia Salas)	34 (9, 8, 9, 8)	Cha-cha-cha	"Echa pa'lante"—Thalía	Safe
Chibolín & Mariale (Carlos Álvarez)	30 (9, 6, 7, 8)	Cha-cha-cha	"Oye Como Va"—Santana feat. Celia Cruz	Sentenced
Erick & Andrea (Nataniel Sánchez)	36 (10, 8, 9, 9)	Cha-cha-cha	"Falsas Esperanzas"—Christina Aguilera	Best steps
Milena & Anselmo	34 (9, 9, 8, 8)	Jazz*	"Sube a Mi Nube"—Nubeluz	Safe
Marisol & Jorge	31 (8, 8, 8, 7)	Jazz*	"Twist de Mi Colegio"—Parchis	Sentenced
Sofía & Andrés	32 (8, 8, 8, 8)	Jazz*	"Ilarie"—Xuxa	—
Ismael & Michelle (Anahí de Cárdenas)	36 (9, 9, 9, 9)	Cha-cha-cha	"Ríe y Llora"—Celia Cruz	Best steps
Alessandra & Raúl (Macs Cayo)	36 (9, 9, 9, 9)	Cha-cha-cha	"Dímelo"—Marc Anthony	Best steps

=== Week 9: Latin Pop Night ===
The couples (except those sentenced) danced latin pop. In the little train, the participants faced dancing jazz.

Due to an injury, Alessandra Denegri could not dance with Raúl Romero, so Chris Soifer enters her place from this week.

Running order

Couple	Scores	Dance	Music	Result
Marisol & Jorge	30 (8, 7, 7, 8)	Marinera*	"La Concheperla"—Rosa Mercedes Ayarza de Morales	Sentenced
Chibolín & Mariale	39 (10, 10, 10, 9)	Samba*	"Conga"—Miami Sound Machine	—
Ismael & Michelle	35 (10, 8, 8, 9)	Latin pop	"Bulería"—David Bisbal	Safe
Chris & Raúl	32 (8, 8, 8, 8)	Latin pop	"Let's Get Loud"—Jennifer Lopez	Safe
Milena & Anselmo	36 (10, 9, 8, 9)	Latin pop	"Tu Veneno"—Natalia Oreiro	Best steps
Erick & Andrea	34 (9, 8, 8, 9)	Latin pop	"Baila Baila"—Chayanne	Safe
Zumba & Malory	32 (8, 8, 8, 8)	Latin pop	"La Copa de la Vida"—Ricky Martin	Safe

The little train
Participants	Judges' votes	Dance	Music	Winner(s)
Women	Mariale, Mariale, Mariale	Jazz	"Single Ladies (Put a Ring on It)" / "Crazy in Love"—Beyoncé	Mariale (2 pts)
Men	Raúl, Raúl, Raúl	Jazz	"Locovox"—Locomía	Raúl (2 pts)

=== Week 10: Jive Night ===
The couples (except those sentenced) danced jive. In the versus, the couples faced dancing guaracha, while in the little train, the participants faced dancing jazz.

Due to an injury, Marisol Ramírez could not dance with Jorge Valcárcel, so Xoana González enters her place from this week.

Running order

Couple	Scores	Dance	Music	Result
Chris & Raúl	32 (8, 7, 9, 8)	Jive	"Girlfriend"—Avril Lavigne	Sentenced
Ismael & Michelle	34 (9, 8, 8, 9)	Jive	"Mambo No. 5 (A Little Bit Of...)"—Lou Bega	Safe
Milena & Anselmo	35 (10, 10, 7, 8)	Jive	"Candyman"—Christina Aguilera	Safe
Zumba & Malory	35 (9, 9, 8, 8)	Bollywood*	"1, 2, 3, 4 Get on the Dance Floor"—from Chennai Express	Safe
Xoana & Jorge	32 (8, 9, 7, 8)	Tango*	"Así se Baila el Tango"—Vero Verdier	Sentenced
Erick & Andrea	35 (9, 9, 8, 9)	Jive	"Wake Me Up Before You Go-Go"—Wham!	Best steps

The versus
Couple	Judges' votes	Dance	Music	Result
Ismael & Michelle	Ismael, Ismael, Ismael	Guaracha	"El Yerberito"—Alquimia la Sonora del XXI	Winners (1 pt)
Erick & Andrea	Ismael, Ismael, Ismael	Guaracha	"El Yerberito"—Alquimia la Sonora del XXI	Losers
Chris & Raúl	Chris, Chris, Chris	Guaracha	"Tu Boquita"—Alquimia la Sonora del XXI	Winners (1 pt)
Xoana & Jorge	Chris, Chris, Chris	Guaracha	"Tu Boquita"—Alquimia la Sonora del XXI	Losers
Milena & Anselmo	Milena, Milena, Milena	Guaracha	"Burundanga"—Alquimia la Sonora del XXI	Winners (1 pt)
Zumba & Malory	Milena, Milena, Milena	Guaracha	"Burundanga"—Alquimia la Sonora del XXI	Losers

The little train
Participants	Judges' votes	Dance	Music	Winner(s)
Women	Michelle, Andrea, Andrea	Jazz	"Siqui siqui" / "Ven a Bailar"—Euforia	Andrea (2 pts)
Men	Raúl, Jorge, Jorge	Jazz	"Y.M.C.A." / "Macho Man"—Village People	Jorge (2 pts)

=== Week 11: Quarterfinals ===
The couples (except those sentenced) performed a trio salsa involving another celebrity and a team dance, in which only celebrities participated.

Running order

Couple (Trio Dance Partner)	Scores	Dance	Music	Result
Chris & Raúl	36 (10, 9, 9, 8)	Festejo*	"Ritmo, Color y Sabor" / "Raíces del Festejo"—Eva Ayllón	Sentenced
Xoana & Jorge	30 (8, 7, 7, 8)	Reggaeton*	"Rakata"—Wisin & Yandel	—
Milena & Anselmo (Natalia Otero)	33 (9, 8, 8, 8)	Salsa	"I Love Salsa"—N'Klabe	Sentenced
Zumba & Malory (Braulio Chappell)	35 (9, 8, 9, 9)	Salsa	"La Malanga"—Eddie Palmieri	Safe
Erick & Andrea (Tati Alcántara)	35 (8, 9, 9, 9)	Salsa	"Timbalero"—El Gran Combo de Puerto Rico	Safe
Ismael & Michelle (Katty García)	36 (10, 8, 9, 9)	Salsa	"Que Se Sepa"—Roberto Roena	Best steps
Xoana; Chris; Milena	0	Jazz (Team A)	"American Woman"—Lenny Kravitz	
Zumba; Erick; Ismael	2	Jazz (Team B)	"Scream & Shout"—Will.i.am feat. Britney Spears "Aguanile"—Marc Anthony	

=== Week 12: Semifinals ===
The couples (except those sentenced) performed a trio double dance involving another celebrity. In the versus, only the sentenced couples faced dancing mambo.

Running order

Couple (Trio Dance Partner)	Scores	Dance	Music	Result
Milena & Anselmo	37 (10, 9, 9, 9)	Hip-hop*	"On the Floor"—Jennifer Lopez feat. Pitbull	Best steps
Chris & Raúl	35 (9, 8, 9, 9)	Salsa*	"Muévete" / "Juana Magdalena"—La Charanga Habanera	—
Zumba & Malory (Sheyla Rojas)	34 (9, 9, 8, 8)	Merengue; Quebradita	"La Cosquillita"—Juan Luis Guerra "El Sonidito"—Hechizeros Band	Sentenced
Erick & Andrea (André Castañeda)	35 (10, 8, 8, 9)	Merengue; Quebradita	"La Dueña del Swing"—Los Hermanos Rosario "La Niña Fresa"—Banda Zeta	Sentenced
Ismael & Michelle (Cindy Marino)	37 (10, 9, 9, 9)	Merengue; Quebradita	"El Baile del Sua Sua"—Kinito Méndez "Vámonos de Fiesta"—Banda el Recodo	Safe

The versus
Couple	Judges' votes	Dance	Music	Result
Milena & Anselmo	Milena, Milena, Milena	Mambo	"Mambo No. 5"—Pérez Prado	Winners (1 pt)
Chris & Raúl	Milena, Milena, Milena	Mambo	"Mambo No. 5"—Pérez Prado	Losers

=== Week 13: Finals ===
On the first part, only the sentenced couples danced cumbia.

On the second part, the final three couples danced freestyle and quickstep.

Running order (Part 1)

Couple	Dance	Music	Result
Erick & Andrea	Cumbia	"La Culebrítica"—Grupo 5	Safe
Zumba & Malory	Cumbia	"La Ricotona"—Grupo 5	Eliminated

Running order (Part 2)

Couple	Dance	Music	Result
Milena & Anselmo	Freestyle	"Baby Boy"—Beyoncé feat.Sean Paul / "Oye!"—Gloria Estefan	Third place
Milena & Anselmo	Quickstep	"Jeannie"—Hugo Montenegro	Third place
Ismael & Michelle	Freestyle	"Papá"—Los Super Mañaneros del Perú	Winners
Ismael & Michelle	Quickstep	"Spider-Man Theme"—Paul Francis Webster & Robert "Bob" Harris	Winners
Erick & Andrea	Freestyle	"Oh, Pretty Woman"—Roy Orbison	Runner-up
Erick & Andrea	Quickstep	"Meet the Flintstones"—Hoyt Curtin, Joseph Barbera & William Hanna	Runner-up

== Dance chart ==
The celebrities and professional partners will dance one of these routines for each corresponding week:

- Week 1: Cumbia or pachanga (First Dances)
- Week 2: One unlearned dance (The Dance That I Do Not Master)
- Week 3: One unlearned dance (Characterization Night)
- Week 4: One unlearned dance (The 90's Night)
- Week 5: Salsa (Salsa Night)
- Week 6: One unlearned dance (World Dances Night)
- Week 7: Double dance & the versus (Double Dance Night)
- Week 8: Trio cha-cha-cha (Trio Cha-cha-cha Night)
- Week 9: Latin pop & the little train (Latin Pop Night)
- Week 10: Jive, the versus & the little train (Jive Night)
- Week 11: Salsa & team dances (Quarterfinals)
- Week 12: Trio double dance & the versus (Semifinals)
- Week 13: Cumbia, freestyle & quickstep (Finals)

Couple	Week 1	Week 2	Week 3	Week 4	Week 5	Week 6	Week 7	Week 8	Week 9	Week 10	Week 11	Week 12	Week 13		
Ismael & Michelle	Pachanga	Rock and roll	Cumbia	Merengue	Salsa	Paso doble	Merengue; Disco	Cha-cha-cha	Latin pop	Jive	Salsa	Merengue; Quebradita	—	Freestyle	Quickstep
Erick & Andrea	Pachanga	Contemporary	Reggaeton	Pachanga	Salsa	Lambada	Hip-hop; Tex-mex	Cha-cha-cha	Latin pop	Jive	Salsa	Merengue; Quebradita	Cumbia	Freestyle	Quickstep
Milena & Anselmo	Cumbia	Axé	Latin pop	Merengue	Salsa	Bollywood	Contemporary; Quebradita	Jazz	Latin pop	Jive	Salsa	Hip-hop	—	Freestyle	Quickstep
Zumba & Malory	Pachanga	Disco	Jazz	Merengue	Salsa	Bachata	Waltz; Cumbia	Cha-cha-cha	Latin pop	Bollywood	Salsa	Merengue; Quebradita	Cumbia		
Chris & Raúl	Cumbia	Merengue	Latin pop	Merengue	Salsa	K-pop	Reggaeton; Cumbia	Cha-cha-cha	Latin pop	Jive	Festejo	Salsa			
Xoana & Jorge	Cumbia	Salsa	Latin pop	Latin pop	Cumbia	Country	Salsa; Rock and roll	Jazz	Marinera	Tango	Reggaeton				
Chibolín & Mariale	Cumbia	Reggaeton	Salsa	Pachanga	Latin pop	Festejo	Jazz; Festejo	Cha-cha-cha	Samba						
Sofía & Andrés	Cumbia	Latin pop	Jazz	Reggaeton	Samba	Hip-hop	Contemporary	Jazz							
Xoana & George	Pachanga	Jazz	Latin pop	Reggaeton	Salsa	Hip-hop	Contemporary								
Coto & Laura	Cumbia	Hip-hop	Latin pop	Latin pop	Salsa	Hip-hop	Contemporary								
Laura & Alfonso	Pachanga	Jazz	Jazz	Reggaeton											
Olinda & Patricio	Pachanga	Jazz	Cumbia												

Modalities of competition
Week 6	Week 7	Week 9	Week 10		Week 11	Week 12
Ismael & Michelle	Jazz	Jazz	Guaracha	Jazz	Jazz	—
Erick & Andrea	Jazz	Jazz	Guaracha	Jazz	Jazz	—
Milena & Anselmo	Jazz	Jazz	Guaracha	Jazz	Jazz	Mambo
Zumba & Malory	Jazz	Jazz	Guaracha	Jazz	Jazz	—
Chris & Raúl	Jazz	Jazz	Guaracha	Jazz	Jazz	Mambo
Xoana & Jorge	Jazz	Jazz	Guaracha	Jazz	Jazz	
Chibolín & Mariale	Jazz	Jazz				
Sofía & Andrés	Jazz					
Xoana & George	Jazz					
Coto & Laura	Jazz					
Laura & Alfonso						
Olinda & Patricio						

Highest scoring dance
Lowest scoring dance
Not scored or danced by the celebrity
Gained bonus points for winning this dance
Gained no bonus points for losing this dance
Danced, but not scored
In Italic indicate the dances performed in the duel
