= El Gran Show season 11 =

El Gran Show: Reyes del show
- Season 11
- Hosted by: Gisela Valcárcel; Aldo Díaz; Francisco "Paco" Bazán; Gachi Rivero
- Judges: Morella Petrozzi; Pachi Valle Riestra; Carlos Cacho; Phillip Butters
- Celebrity winner: Carolina Cano
- Professional winner: Eduardo Pastrana
- No. of episodes: 7

Release
- Original network: América Televisión
- Original release: November 9 – December 21, 2013

Season chronology
- ← Previous; Season 10 Next → Season 12

Reyes del Show (English: Show Kings) is the season three of the 2013 edition of El Gran Show premiered on November 9, 2013.

This season the 11 golden palette returned. In addition, there was a change in the mechanics of elimination: two couples were sentenced and during the same gala the duel was held, the public had 10 minutes to vote, the less voted party was eliminated. There was also a change in the danceathon, being of immediate elimination, until there is only one winning couple.

On December 21, 2013, actress Carolina Cano and Eduardo Pastrana were crowned champions, model & reality TV star Gino Pesaressi and Jacqueline Alfaro finished second, while actress & model Emilia Drago and Sergio Lois finished third.

== Cast ==
=== Couples ===
The participating couples of this season were made up of the first three places of the first and second season, being the season with the fewest couples so far. Arturo Chumbe and César "Chechi" Yáñez returned as coaches.

Celebrity	Notability (known for)	Professional partner	Status	Ref.
Víctor Hugo Dávila	Journalist and TV host	Lindathay Valero; Julliana Villacorta (week 2)	Eliminated 1st on November 16, 2013	
Claudia Portocarrero	Model & TV host	Joel Velázquez	Eliminated 2nd on November 30, 2013	
Sheyla Rojas	Model & reality TV star	Gustavo Rivera	Eliminated 3rd on December 7, 2013	
Emilia Drago	Actress & model	Sergio Lois	Third place on December 21, 2013	
Gino Pesaressi	Model & reality TV star	Jacqueline Alfaro	Runner-up on December 21, 2013	
Carolina Cano	Actress	Eduardo Pastrana	Winners on December 21, 2013	

Teams
Coach	Couples		
Arturo Chumbe	Carolina & Eduardo	Víctor Hugo & Lindathay	Emilia & Sergio
César "Chechi" Yáñez	Gino & Jacqueline	Claudia & Joel	Sheyla & Gustavo

==== Previous seasons ====
Season	Celebrity	Partner	Average	Place
1	Emilia Drago	Sergio Lois	36.5	1.º
1	Víctor Hugo Dávila	Lindathay Valero	33.0	2.º
1	Claudia Portocarrero	Joel Velázquez	33.6	3.º
2	Gino Pesaressi	Jacqueline Alfaro	34.9	1.º
2	Sheyla Rojas	Emanuel Colombo	32.6	2.º
2	Carolina Cano	Eduardo Pastrana	36.4	3.º

=== Host and judges ===
Gisela Valcárcel, Aldo Díaz, Paco Bazán and Gachi Rivero returned as hosts, while Morella Petrozzi, Carlos Cacho, Phillip Butters, Pachi Valle Riestra and the VIP Jury returned as judges.

== Scoring charts ==
Couple	Place	1	2	3	4	5	6	7	
Couple	Place	1	2	3	4	5	6	Top 3	Top 2
Carolina & Eduardo	1	42	51	84	91	89	100	96	+48=144
Gino & Jacqueline	2	43	47	85	87	89	92	94	+47=141
Emilia & Sergio	3	45	46	84	98	93	106	102	
Sheyla & Gustavo	4	46	46	81	86	81			
Claudia & Joel	5	39	40	80	85				
Víctor Hugo & Lindathay	6	37	36						

Green numbers indicate the best steps for each week
the couple was sentenced and eliminated that week
the couple was sentenced and saved that week
the couple was sentenced and eliminated that week, but saved with a lifeguard
the winning couple
the runner-up couple
the third-place couple

=== Average score chart ===
This table only counts dances scored on a 40-point scale.

Rank by average	Place	Couple	Total points	Number of dances	Average
1	3	Emilia & Sergio	453	12	37.8
2	1	Carolina & Eduardo	477	13	36.7
3	2	Gino & Jacqueline	459	13	35.4
4	4	Sheyla & Gustavo	272	8	34.0
5	5	Claudia & Joel	199	6	33.2
6	6	Víctor Hugo & Lindathay	59	2	29.5

=== Highest and lowest scoring performances ===
The best and worst performances in each dance according to the judges' 40-point scale are as follows:

Dance	Highest scored dancer(s)	Highest score	Lowest scored dancer(s)	Lowest score
Merengue	Emilia Drago	36	Sheyla Rojas	33
Hip-hop	Carolina Cano	32	Gino Pesaressi	31
Salsa	Gino Pesaressi; Emilia Drago	40	Víctor Hugo Dávila	30
Pop	Carolina Cano	38	Víctor Hugo Dávila	29
Freestyle	Carolina Cano	38	Sheyla Rojas; Gino Pesaressi	34
Reggaeton	Emilia Drago	39	Gino Pesaressi; Claudia Portocarrero	31
Cumbia	Emilia Drago; Gino Pesaressi	40	Sheyla Rojas; Claudia Portocarrero	36
Pachanga	Emilia Drago	36	Sheyla Rojas	28
Strip dance	Emilia Drago	37	Sheyla Rojas	35
Tex-mex	Emilia Drago; Carolina Cano	37	Gino Pesaressi	34
Mix	Emilia Drago	39	Gino Pesaressi	34
Jive	Carolina Cano	38	—	—
Rumba flamenca	Gino Pesaressi	37	—	—

=== Couples' highest and lowest scoring dances ===
Scores are based upon a potential 40-point maximum.

Couples	Highest scoring dance(s)	Lowest scoring dance(s)
Carolina & Eduardo	Tex-mex (40)	Latin pop (32)
Gino & Jacqueline	Salsa & Cumbia (40)	Reggaeton (31)
Emilia & Sergio	Salsa, Tex-Mex & Cumbia (40)	Pop & Freestyle (35)
Sheyla & Gustavo	Salsa (37)	Pachanga (28)
Claudia & Joel	Cumbia (36)	Salsa & Reggaeton (31)
Víctor Hugo & Lindathay	Salsa (30)	Pop (29)

== Weekly scores ==
Individual judges' scores in the charts below (given in parentheses) are listed in this order from left to right: Morella Petrozzi, Carlos Cacho, Phillip Butters, Pachi Valle Riestra, VIP Jury.

=== Week 1: First Dances ===
The couples danced hip-hop, merengue or salsa, a team dance and the danceathon. In the duel, the elimination was canceled because the production only used it as a demonstration method.

Running order

Couple	Scores	Dance	Music	Result
Emilia & Sergio	45 (10, 8, 9, 9, 9)	Merengue	"Abusadora"—Wilfrido Vargas	Safe
Víctor Hugo & Lindathay	37 (8, 7, 8, 7, 7)	Salsa	"Las Cajas"—Joe Arroyo	Sentenced
Gino & Jacqueline	41 (8, 8, 8, 8, 9)	Hip-hop	"Bon, Bon"—Pitbull	Safe
Sheyla & Gustavo	42 (8, 9, 8, 8, 9)	Merengue	"La Reina del Swing"—Los Hermanos Rosario	Best steps
Claudia & Joel	39 (8, 7, 8, 8, 8)	Salsa	"Timbalero"—El Gran Combo de Puerto Rico	Sentenced
Carolina & Eduardo	40 (9, 8, 7, 8, 8)	Hip-hop	"Pégate"—Ricky Martin	Safe
Victor Hugo & Lindathay; Emilia & Sergio; Claudia & Joel	0	Jazz (Team "1st season")	"Mickey"—Toni Basil "Give Me All Your Luvin'"—Madonna feat. Nicki Minaj & M.I.A.	
Carolina & Eduardo; Gino & Jacqueline; Sheyla & Gustavo	2	Jazz (Team "2nd season")	"Peacock"—Katy Perry "Girlfriend"—Avril Lavigne	
Carolina & Eduardo; Victor Hugo & Lindathay; Emilia & Sergio; Gino & Jacqueline; Claudia & Joel; Sheyla & Gustavo	2	Cumbia; Pachanga; Disco; Cumbia; Pachanga (The danceathon)		
The duel
Claudia & Joel		Merengue	"El Rompecintura"—Los Hermanos Rosario	
Víctor Hugo & Lindathay		Cumbia	"El Arbolito"—Grupo Néctar	

=== Week 2: The Pop Stars ===
The couples danced pop and the danceathon. In the versus, the couples faced dancing different dance styles.

Due to an injury, Lindathay Valero was unable to perform, so Víctor Hugo Dávila danced with troupe member Julliana Villacorta instead.

Running order

Couple	Scores	Dance	Music	Result
Sheyla & Gustavo	44 (9, 9, 9, 8, 9)	Pop	"Let's Get Loud"—Jennifer Lopez	Safe
Claudia & Joel	40 (8, 8, 8, 8, 8)	Pop	"Single Ladies (Put a Ring on It)"—Beyoncé	Sentenced
Emilia & Sergio	44 (8, 8, 10, 9, 9)	Pop	"Toxic"—Britney Spears	Safe
Gino & Jacqueline	45 (9, 10, 8, 9, 9)	Pop	"Beat it" / "Smooth Criminal"—Michael Jackson	Safe
Carolina & Eduardo	49 (11, 8, 10, 10, 10)	Pop	"Music"—Madonna	Best steps
Victor Hugo & Julliana	36 (8, 7, 7, 7, 7)	Pop	"SexyBack"—Justin Timberlake	Sentenced
Carolina & Eduardo; Victor Hugo & Lindathay; Emilia & Sergio; Gino & Jacqueline; Claudia & Joel; Sheyla & Gustavo	2	Cumbia; Pachanga; Salsa; Pachanga; Festejo (The danceathon)		
The duel
Claudia & Joel		Pachanga	"Chuntaro Style"—El Gran Silencio	Safe
Víctor Hugo & Julliana		Rock and roll	"Rock Around the Clock"—Bill Haley & His Comets	Eliminated

The versus
Couple	Judges' votes	Dance	Music	Result
Emilia & Sergio	Emilia, Gino, Emilia, Emilia	Cumbia	"El Tao Tao"—Grupo 5	Winners (2 pts)
Gino & Jacqueline	Emilia, Gino, Emilia, Emilia	Cumbia	"Me Gusta"—Tommy Portugal y La Pasión	Losers
Carolina & Eduardo	Carolina, Carolina, Claudia, Carolina	Guaracha	"El Yerberito Moderno"—Celia Cruz	Winners (2 pts)
Claudia & Joel	Carolina, Carolina, Claudia, Carolina	Guaracha	"La Corneta"—Alquimia la Sonora del XXI	Losers
Sheyla & Gustavo	Sheyla, Sheyla, Sheyla, Sheyla	Merengue	"Zúmbalo"—Los Melódicos	Winners (2 pts)
Víctor Hugo & Julliana	Sheyla, Sheyla, Sheyla, Sheyla	Merengue	"Tú la Tienes Que Pagar"—Natusha	Losers

=== Week 3: Salsa & Freestyle Night ===
The couples danced salsa, a freestyle performed in a rotating room and the danceathon.

Running order

Couple	Scores (Note: In the freestyle round, the VIP jury did not cast their vote.)	Dance	Music	Result
Carolina & Eduardo	46 (10, 10, 9, 8, 9)	Salsa	"La Malanga"—Eddie Palmieri	Safe
Carolina & Eduardo	38 (10, 10, 9, 9, X)	Freestyle	"Baila, Baila"—Chayanne	Safe
Emilia & Sergio	49 (10, 9, 11, 9, 10)	Salsa	"Aguanile"—Marc Anthony	Safe
Emilia & Sergio	35 (9, 9, 9, 8, X)	Freestyle	"Dame Más"—Ricky Martin	Safe
Sheyla & Gustavo	47 (11, 9, 10, 8, 9)	Salsa	"Quimbara"—Celia Cruz & Johnny Pacheco	Sentenced
Sheyla & Gustavo	34 (7, 9, 10, 8, X)	Freestyle	"Eternamente Bella"—Alejandra Guzmán	Sentenced
Claudia & Joel	43 (8, 9, 9, 8, 9)	Salsa	"El Todopoderoso"—Héctor Lavoe	Sentenced
Claudia & Joel	35 (9, 8, 10, 8, X)	Freestyle	"Lo Haré Por Ti"—Paulina Rubio	Sentenced
Gino & Jacqueline	50 (10, 10, 11, 10, 9)	Salsa	"Que Cosa Tan Linda"—Oscar D'León	Best steps
Gino & Jacqueline	35 (8, 9, 11, 7, X)	Freestyle	"Oye el Boom"—David Bisbal	Best steps
Carolina & Eduardo; Emilia & Sergio; Gino & Jacqueline; Claudia & Joel; Sheyla & Gustavo	2	Cumbia; Salsa; Reggaeton; Cumbia (The danceathon)		
The duel
Sheyla & Gustavo		Reggaeton	"Ahora Es"—Wisin & Yandel	Safe
Claudia & Joel		Reggaeton	"El Ritmo No Perdona (Prende)"—Daddy Yankee	Safe

=== Week 4: Reggaeton & Cumbia Night ===
The couples danced reggaeton and cumbia.

Running order

Couple	Scores	Dance	Music	Result
Gino & Jacqueline	41 (8, 8, 8, 7, 10)	Reggaeton	"Ella se Arrebata—Latin Fresh	Sentenced
Gino & Jacqueline	46 (9, 9, 10, 9, 9)	Cumbia	"La Terecumbia"—Tommy Portugal	Sentenced
Sheyla & Gustavo	41 (9, 8, 10, 7, 7)	Reggaeton	"Rakata"—Wisin & Yandel	Safe
Sheyla & Gustavo	45 (8, 9, 11, 9, 8)	Cumbia	"La Escobita"—Marisol y La Magia del Norte	Safe
Emilia & Sergio	49 (10, 10, 9, 10, 10)	Reggaeton	"Veo Veo"—Guajiros	Best steps
Emilia & Sergio	49 (11, 9, 10, 9, 10)	Cumbia	"La Culebrítica"—Grupo 5	Best steps
Claudia & Joel	39 (8, 8, 8, 7, 8)	Reggaeton	"Quema, Quema"—Aldo & Dandy	Sentenced
Claudia & Joel	46 (10, 8, 11, 8, 9)	Cumbia	"La caderona"—Los Villacorta	Sentenced
Carolina & Eduardo	45 (10, 9, 8, 8, 10)	Reggaeton	"Gasolina—Daddy Yankee	Safe
Carolina & Eduardo	46 (10, 9, 9, 9, 9)	Cumbia	"Así Son los Hombres—Marina Yafac	Safe
The duel
Claudia & Joel		Merengue	"Chicharrón"—Oro Solido	Eliminated
Gino & Jacqueline		Latin pop	"Este Ritmo Se Baila Así"—Chayanne	Safe

=== Week 5: Quarterfinals ===
The couples danced pachanga and trio strip dance involving another celebrity. In the little train, the participants faced dancing jazz.

Running order

Couple (Trio Dance Partner)	Scores	Dance	Music	Result
Carolina & Eduardo (Claudia Abusada)	44 (9, 9, 8, 8, 10)	Pachanga	"Bara Bará Bere Berê"—Michel Teló	Safe
Carolina & Eduardo (Claudia Abusada)	45 (8, 10, 9, 9, 9)	Strip dance	"I'm a Slave 4 U"—Britney Spears	Safe
Sheyla & Gustavo (Aída Martínez)	37 (7, 7, 8, 6, 9)	Pachanga	"El Murguero"—Los Autenticos Decadentes	Sentenced
Sheyla & Gustavo (Aída Martínez)	42 (9, 10, 8, 8, 7)	Strip dance	"I Love Rock 'N Roll"—Joan Jett and the Blackhearts	Sentenced
Gino & Jacqueline (Jamila Dahabreh)	42 (8, 8, 9, 7, 10)	Pachanga	"Gitana"—Los Fabulosos Cadillacs	Sentenced
Gino & Jacqueline (Jamila Dahabreh)	46 (9, 11, 9, 8, 9)	Strip dance	"Cryin'"—Aerosmith	Sentenced
Emilia & Sergio (Fiorella Flores)	46 (9, 8, 10, 9, 10)	Pachanga	"Mesa Que Más Aplauda"—Grupo Climax	Best steps
Emilia & Sergio (Fiorella Flores)	46 (10, 9, 10, 8, 9)	Strip dance	"Man! I Feel Like a Woman!"—Shania Twain	Best steps
The duel
Sheyla & Gustavo		Disco	"Boogie Wonderland"—Earth, Wind & Fire	Eliminated
Gino & Jacqueline		Hip-hop	"Party Rock Anthem"—LMFAO feat. Lauren Bennett y GoonRock	Safe

The little train
Participants	Judges' votes	Dance	Music	Winner(s)
Women	Emilia, Jacqueline, Jacqueline, Emilia	Jazz	"Rabiosa" / "Loba" / "Waka Waka" / "Ojos Así"—Shakira	Emilia, Jacqueline (1 pt)
Men	Sergio, Gustavo, Gustavo, Eduardo	Jazz	"Bad" / "Beat It" / "Billie Jean" / "Thriller"—Michael Jackson	Gustavo (2 pts)

=== Week 6: Semifinals ===
The couples danced salsa and trio tex-mex involving another celebrity. In the versus, the couples faced dancing different dance styles.

Running order

Couple (Trio Dance Partner)	Scores	Dance	Music	Result
Emilia & Sergio (Tati Alcántara)	53 (11, 11, 11, 10, 10)	Salsa	"'Ta Bueno Ya"—Albita Rodríguez	Best steps
Emilia & Sergio (Tati Alcántara)	51 (11, 10, 10, 10, 10)	Tex-mex	"Baila Esta Cumbia"—Selena	Best steps
Carolina & Eduardo (Jhoany Vegas)	47 (10, 10, 9, 8, 10)	Salsa	"Quimbara"—Celia Cruz & Johnny Pacheco	Sentenced
Carolina & Eduardo (Jhoany Vegas)	51 (10, 10, 11, 10, 10)	Tex-mex	"No Tengo Dinero"—Kumbia Kings feat. Juan Gabriel y El Gran Silencio	Sentenced
Gino & Jacqueline (Junior Silva)	46 (9, 9, 10, 9, 9)	Salsa	"Si Estuvieras Aquí"—N' Samble	Sentenced
Gino & Jacqueline (Junior Silva)	44 (8, 10, 8, 8, 10)	Tex-mex	"Bidi Bidi Bom Bom"—Selena	Sentenced
The duel
Carolina & Eduardo		Adagio	"Yo Soy una Mujer"—Maggie Carles	Safe
Gino & Jacqueline		Disco	"Born to Be Alive"—Patrick Hernandez	Safe

The versus
Couple	Dance	Music	Judges' decision
Carolina & Eduardo	Cha-cha-cha	"Falsas Esperanzas"—Christina Aguilera	2 extra points awarded
Alexandra Barrios & Kevin Ubillus	Cha-cha-cha	"S&M"—Rihanna & Britney Spears	2 extra points awarded
Emilia & Sergio	Marinera	"La Concheperla"—Banda de la PNP	2 extra points awarded
Miguel Olave & Katherine Adrianzén	Marinera	"Pañuelos al Aire"—Banda de la PNP	2 extra points awarded
Gino & Jacqueline	Hip-hop	"Let's Get It Started"—The Black Eyed Peas	2 extra points awarded
John Cáceres & Autumn Marie Dones	Hip-hop	"Pump It"—The Black Eyed Peas	2 extra points awarded

=== Week 7: Finals ===
On the first part, the couples danced cumbia and a mix trio dance (mambo/merengue/quebradita) involving another celebrity.

On the second part, the final three couples performed one unlearned dance.

Running order (Part 1)

Couple	Scores (Note: In this week, there was no secret vote because the winner was chosen by the votes of the public.)	Dance	Music	Result
Carolina & Eduardo (Jesús Neyra)	46 (10, 9, 9, 8, 10)	Cumbia	"Humíllate"—Hermanos Yaipén	Safe
Carolina & Eduardo (Jesús Neyra)	50 (9, 11, 10, 10, 10)	Mambo; Merengue; Quebradita	"Que Rico Mambo"—Pérez Prado "La Dueña del Swing"—Los Hermanos Rosario "El Sonidito"—Hechizeros Band	Safe
Emilia & Sergio (Jaime "Choca" Mandros)	52 (11, 10, 10, 11, 10)	Cumbia	"A Llorar a Otra Parte"—Hermanos Yaipén	Third place
Emilia & Sergio (Jaime "Choca" Mandros)	50 (10, 10, 11, 9, 10)	Mambo; Merengue; Quebradita	"Mambo No. 8"—Pérez Prado "El Rompecintura"—Los Hermanos Rosario "La Quebradora"—Banda El Recodo	Third place
Gino & Jacqueline (Angie Arizaga)	50 (10, 10, 10, 10, 10)	Cumbia	"Con los Hermanos Yaipén"—Hermanos Yaipén	Safe
Gino & Jacqueline (Angie Arizaga)	44 (8, 9, 9, 8, 10)	Mambo; Merengue; Quebradita	"Mambo No. 5 (A Little Bit Of...)"—Lou Bega "Guayando"—Fulanito "Palo Bonito"—Banda Mazatlán	Safe

Running order (Part 2)

Couple	Scores	Dance	Music	Result
Carolina & Eduardo	48 (10, 10, 9, 9, 10)	Jive	"Candyman"—Christina Aguilera	Winners
Gino & Jacqueline	47 (10, 9, 9, 9, 10)	Rumba flamenca	"Bamboléo"—Gipsy Kings	Runner-up

== Dance chart ==
The celebrities and professional partners will dance one of these routines for each corresponding week:

- Week 1: Hip-hop, merengue or salsa, team dances & the danceathon (First Dances)
- Week 2: Pop, the danceathon & the versus (The Pop Stars)
- Week 3: Salsa, freestyle & the danceathon (Salsa & Freestyle Night)
- Week 4: Reggaeton & cumbia (Reggaeton & Cumbia Night)
- Week 5: Pachanga, strip dance & the little train (Quarterfinals)
- Week 6: Salsa, tex-mex & the versus (Semifinals)
- Week 7: Cumbia, mix (mambo/merengue/quebradita) & one unlearned dance (Finals)

Couple	Week 1	Week 2	Week 3		Week 4		Week 5		Week 6		Week 7		
Carolina & Eduardo	Hip-hop	Pop	Salsa	Freestyle	Reggaeton	Cumbia	Pachanga	Strip dance	Salsa	Tex-mex	Cumbia	Mix	Jive
Gino & Jacqueline	Hip-hop	Pop	Salsa	Freestyle	Reggaeton	Cumbia	Pachanga	Strip dance	Salsa	Tex-mex	Cumbia	Mix	Rumba flamenca
Emilia & Sergio	Merengue	Pop	Salsa	Freestyle	Reggaeton	Cumbia	Pachanga	Strip dance	Salsa	Tex-mex	Cumbia	Mix	
Sheyla & Gustavo	Merengue	Pop	Salsa	Freestyle	Reggaeton	Cumbia	Pachanga	Strip dance					
Claudia & Joel	Salsa	Pop	Salsa	Freestyle	Reggaeton	Cumbia							
Víctor Hugo & Lindathay	Salsa	Pop											

Modalities of competition
Couple	Week 1		Week 2		Week 3	Week 5	Week 6
Carolina & Eduardo	Jazz	Cumbia; Pachanga; Disco; Cumbia; Pachanga	Cumbia; Pachanga; Salsa; Festejo	Guaracha	Cumbia; Salsa; Reggaeton; Cumbia	Jazz	Cha-cha-cha
Gino & Jacqueline	Jazz	Cumbia; Pachanga; Disco; Cumbia; Pachanga	Cumbia; Pachanga; Salsa; Festejo	Cumbia	Cumbia; Salsa; Reggaeton; Cumbia	Jazz	Hip-hop
Emilia & Sergio	Jazz	Cumbia; Pachanga; Disco; Cumbia; Pachanga	Cumbia; Pachanga; Salsa; Festejo	Cumbia	Cumbia; Salsa; Reggaeton; Cumbia	Jazz	Marinera
Sheyla & Gustavo	Jazz	Cumbia; Pachanga; Disco; Cumbia; Pachanga	Cumbia; Pachanga; Salsa; Festejo	Merengue	Cumbia; Salsa; Reggaeton; Cumbia	Jazz	
Claudia & Joel	Jazz	Cumbia; Pachanga; Disco; Cumbia; Pachanga	Cumbia; Pachanga; Salsa; Festejo	Guaracha	Cumbia; Salsa; Reggaeton; Cumbia		
Víctor Hugo & Lindathay	Jazz	Cumbia; Pachanga; Disco; Cumbia; Pachanga	Cumbia; Pachanga; Salsa; Festejo	Merengue			

Highest scoring dance
Lowest scoring dance
Gained bonus points for winning this dance
Gained no bonus points for losing this dance
