= El Gran Show season 10 =

El Gran Show
- Season 10
- Hosted by: Gisela Valcárcel; Aldo Díaz; Francisco "Paco" Bazán; Gachi Rivero
- Judges: Morella Petrozzi; Pachi Valle Riestra; Carlos Cacho; Phillip Butters
- Celebrity winner: Gino Pesaressi
- Professional winner: Jacqueline Alfaro
- No. of episodes: 12

Release
- Original network: América Televisión
- Original release: August 17 – November 2, 2013

Season chronology
- ← Previous; Season 9 Next → Season 11

Season two of the 2013 edition of El Gran Show premiered on August 17, 2013.

This season continued with the format of last season, in the duel the couple saved is the highest score with the help of 2 extra points from the public. The modality of teams and coaches was also continued.

On November 2, 2013, model & reality TV star Gino Pesaressi and Jacqueline Alfaro were declared the winners, model & reality TV star Sheyla Rojas and Emanuel Colombo finished second, while actress Carolina Cano and Eduardo Pastrana were third.

== Cast ==
=== Couples ===
The 12 celebrities were presented during the final of last season. Among them returned Edith Tapia, who could not compete last season, and Luis Baca, dreamer on El Show de los sueños, becoming the first dreamer to compete as a celebrity in the history of the show. The professional dancers who returned were Jacqueline Alfaro, Angelo Cano, Vania Carbone, Emanuel Colombo, André Lecca (dreamer on season 2 of 2011), Eduardo Pastrana, Gustavo Rivera, Juan Tamayo and Kevin Ubillus.

Celebrity	Notability (known for)	Professional partner	Status	Ref.
Antonio Pavón	Former bullfighter	Yanilú Mori	Eliminated 1st on August 31, 2013	
María Victoria Santana	Actress and comedian	Kevin Ubillus; George Neyra (week 1)	Withdrew on September 7, 2013	
Christian del Mar	Former football player	Vania Carbone	Eliminated 2nd on September 14, 2013	
Grasse Becerra	Former vedette & model	Angelo Cano	Eliminated 3rd on September 21, 2013	
Edith Tapia	Model & fashion producer	André Lecca	Eliminated 4th on September 28, 2013	
Junior Silva	Al Fondo Hay Sitio actor	Julliana Villacorta	Eliminated 5th on October 12, 2013	
Mónica Torres	Al Fondo Hay Sitio actress	Gustavo Rivera	Eliminated 6th on October 19, 2013	
Luis Baca	Actor & singer	Milagros Lareto	Eliminated 7th on October 26, 2013	
Vania Bludau	Model	Juan Tamayo	Eliminated 8th on November 2, 2013	
Carolina Cano	Actress	Eduardo Pastrana	Third place on November 2, 2013	
Sheyla Rojas	Model & reality TV star	Emanuel Colombo; Juan Pablo Lostannau (week 1)	Runner-up on November 2, 2013	
Gino Pesaressi	Model & reality TV star	Jacqueline Alfaro	Winners on November 2, 2013	

Teams
Coach	Couples		
Arturo Chumbe	Luis & Milagros	Grasse & Angelo	Carolina & Eduardo
Arturo Chumbe	Antonio & Yanilú	La Pánfila & Charles	Edith & André
César "Chechi" Yáñez	Vania & Juan	Christian & Vania	Gino & Jacqueline
César "Chechi" Yáñez	Sheyla & Emanuel	Junior & Julliana	Mónica & Gustavo

=== Host and judges ===
Gisela Valcárcel, Aldo Díaz, Paco Bazán and Gachi Rivero returned as hosts, while Morella Petrozzi, Carlos Cacho, Phillip Butters, Pachi Valle Riestra and the VIP Jury returned as judges.

== Scoring charts ==
Couple	Place	1	2	3	4	5	6	7	8	9	10	11	12	
Couple	Place	1	2	3	4	5	6	7	8	9	10	11	Top 4	Top 3
Gino & Jacqueline	1	41	43	43	46	46	48	44	46	83	90	87	97	+46=143
Sheyla & Emanuel	2	35	40	44	42	42	45	43	43	84	82	84	88	+43=131
Carolina & Eduardo	3	45	45	45	46	44	46	49	48	93	90	93	93	+49=142
Vania & Juan	4	41	45	42	47	47	48	39	47	83	88	90	92	
Luis & Milagros	5	39	40	44	44	38	47	47	38	91	85	88		
Mónica & Gustavo	6	34	41	41	41	43	39	45	48	74	76			
Junior & Julliana	7	38	41	43	39	46	44	42	41	78				
Edith & André	8	37	36	37	38	45	35	40						
Grasse & Angelo	9	33	38	39	45	40	40							
Christian & Vania	10	31	35	40	37	36								
La Pánfila & Kevin	11	39	38	43	—									
Antonio & Yanilú	12	29	30	34										

Red numbers indicate the sentenced for each week
Green numbers indicate the best steps for each week
the couple was eliminated that week
the couple was safe in the duel
the couple was eliminated that week and safe with a lifeguard
this couple withdrew from the competition
the winning couple
the runner-up couple
the third-place couple

=== Average score chart ===
This table only counts dances scored on a 40-point scale (the VIP jury scores are excluded).

Rank by average	Place	Couple	Total points	Number of dances	Average
1	3	Carolina & Eduardo	619	17	36.4
2	1	Gino & Jacqueline	593	17	34.9
3	4	Vania & Juan	550	16	34.4
4	5	Luis & Milagros	465	14	33.2
5	2	Sheyla & Emanuel	555	17	32.6
6	7	Junior & Julliana	314	10	31.4
7	11	La Pánfila & Kevin	92	3	30.7
8	6	Mónica & Gustavo	364	12	30.3
9	9	Grasse & Angelo	178	6	29.7
10	8	Edith & André	204	7	29.1
11	10	Christian & Vania	136	5	27.2
12	12	Antonio & Yanilú	67	3	22.3

=== Highest and lowest scoring performances ===
The best and worst performances in each dance according to the judges' 40-point scale (the VIP jury scores are excluded) are as follows:

Dance	Highest scored dancer(s)	Highest score	Lowest scored dancer(s)	Lowest score
Salsa	Carolina Cano	39	Antonio Pavón	22
Latin pop	Carolina Cano	36	Antonio Pavón	21
Pachanga	Carolina Cano	35	Sheyla Rojas	27
Cumbia	Vania Bludau	38	Christian del Mar	29
Jazz	Carolina Cano	37	Edith Tapia	28
Reggaeton	Vania Bludau	36	Christian del Mar	26
Vallenato	Gino Pesaressi	35	Edith Tapia	29
Hip-hop	Gino Pesaressi	39	Mónica Torres	29
Disco	Gino Pesaressi	37	Antonio Pavón	24
Merengue	Vania Bludau; Carolina Cano; Gino Pesaressi	37	Christian del Mar	29
Tango	Edith Tapia	28	Edith Tapia	27
Guaracha	Junior Silva	35	—	—
World dances	Gino Pesaressi	37	Edith Tapia	27
Cha-cha-cha	Carolina Cano	38	Vania Bludau; Sheyla Rojas	31
Paso doble	Gino Pesaressi	33	—	—
Samba	Vania Bludau	35	Junior Silva	33
Jive	Luis Baca	35	—	—
Tex-mex	Gino Pesaressi; Vania Bludau	35	Mónica Torres	30
Mambo	Junior Silva	31	Mónica Torres	28
Adagio	Carolina Cano	40	Mónica Torres	29
Strip dance	Vania Bludau	37	Gino Pesaressi; Sheyla Rojas	33
Fusion dance	Carolina Cano	39	Sheyla Rojas	34
Festejo	Vania Bludau	36	—	—
Bollywood	Sheyla Rojas	34	Sheyla Rojas	32
Freestyle	Gino Pesaressi	38	Sheyla Rojas	34
Quickstep	Carolina Cano	39	Sheyla Rojas	33

=== Couples' highest and lowest scoring dances ===
Scores are based upon a potential 40-point maximum (the VIP jury scores are excluded).

Couples	Highest scoring dance(s)	Lowest scoring dance(s)
Gino & Jacqueline	Hip-hop (39)	Vallenato (31)
Sheyla & Emanuel	Salsa (35)	Pachanga (27)
Carolina & Eduardo	Adagio (40)	Merengue, Can-can & Strip dance (34)
Vania & Juan	Cumbia (38)	Vallenato & Cha-cha-cha (31)
Luis & Milagros	Jazz (36)	Latin pop & Merengue (30)
Mónica & Gustavo	Salsa (36)	Latin pop (25)
Junior & Julliana	Guaracha (35)	Salsa (29)
Edith & André	Latin pop (33)	Tango (26)
Grasse & Angelo	Salsa (32)	Latin pop (25)
Christian & Vania	Merengue & Cumbia (29)	Salsa (24)
La Pánfila & Kevin	Vallenato (33)	Pachanga (29)
Antonio & Yanilú	Disco (24)	Latin pop (21)

== Weekly scores ==
Individual judges' scores in the charts below (given in parentheses) are listed in this order from left to right: Morella Petrozzi, Carlos Cacho, Phillip Butters, Pachi Valle Riestra, VIP Jury.

=== Week 1: First Dances ===
The couples danced cumbia, jazz, latin pop, pachanga, reggaeton or salsa. This week, none couples were sentenced.

Running order

Couple	Scores	Dance	Music	Result
Christian & Vania	31 (6, 7, 6, 5, 7)	Salsa	"Pedro Navaja"—Willie Colón & Rubén Blades	Safe
Grasse & Angelo	33 (6, 7, 6, 6, 8)	Latin pop	"Loba"—Shakira	Safe
Sheyla & Juan Pablo	35 (7, 6, 7, 7, 8)	Pachanga	"Bara Bará Bere Berê"—Michel Teló	Safe
Antonio & Yanilú	29 (5, 5, 6, 5, 8)	Latin pop	"Torero"—Chayanne	Safe
Vania & Juan	41 (8, 7, 9, 8, 9)	Cumbia	"La Ricotona"—Armonía 10	Safe
Edith & André	37 (7, 7, 7, 7, 9)	Jazz	"Vogue"—Madonna	Safe
Carolina & Eduardo	45 (9, 8, 9, 9, 10)	Pachanga	"Pa' Que lo Tengas Claro"—Franco & Oscarcito	Best steps
Mónica & Gustavo	34 (6, 6, 7, 6, 9)	Latin pop	"Mujer Latina"—Thalía	Safe
Junior & Julliana	38 (8, 6, 8, 7, 9)	Salsa	"Muévete" / "Juana Magdalena"—La Charanga Habanera	Safe
Gino & Jacqueline	41 (8, 8, 9, 8, 8)	Reggaeton	"El Ritmo No Perdona (Prende)"—Daddy Yankee	Safe
Luis & Milagros	39 (7, 8, 7, 8, 9)	Latin pop	"Dame Más"—Ricky Martin	Safe
La Pánfila & George	39 (7, 8, 8, 7, 9)	Cumbia	"Cómo Se Mata el Gusano"—Papillon	Safe

=== Week 2: Celebrity's Pick Night ===
The couples performed a dance chosen by celebrities. In the challenge, it was decided that two members of each team would face each other, Maria Victoria "La Pánfila" Santana represented Team Chumbe while Vania Bludau represented Team Chechi, with Bludau being the winner, granting an extra point to each team member.

Running order

Couple	Scores	Dance	Music	Result
Grasse & Angelo	38 (7, 8, 8, 7, 8)	Cumbia	"Así Son los Hombres"—Marina Yafac	Safe
Mónica & Gustavo	40 (7, 8, 8, 8, 9)	Salsa	"Quimbombó"—Hermanos Moreno	Safe
Sheyla & Emanuel	39 (8, 7, 8, 8, 8)	Latin pop	"Rain Over Me"—Pitbull feat. Marc Anthony	Safe
Luis & Milagros	40 (8, 7, 8, 8, 9)	Reggaeton	"Noche de Entierro (Nuestro Amor)"—Luny Tunes	Safe
Junior & Julliana	40 (8, 7, 8, 8, 9)	Cumbia	"El Arbolito"—Grupo Néctar	Safe
Antonio & Yanilú	30 (5, 6, 6, 5, 8)	Salsa	"Brujería"—El Gran Combo de Puerto Rico	Sentenced
Carolina & Eduardo	45 (10, 9, 8, 9, 9)	Latin pop	"Echa pa'lante"—Thalía	Best steps
Vania & Juan	44 (9, 9, 9, 8, 9)	Jazz	"Play"—Jennifer Lopez	Best steps
Christian & Vania	34 (6, 7, 7, 6, 8)	Reggaeton	"Gata Fiera"—Trebol Clan feat. Héctor el Father y Joan	Sentenced
Gino & Jacqueline	42 (8, 9, 8, 8, 9)	Latin pop	"Ay Mama"—Chayanne	Safe
Edith & André	36 (7, 7, 7, 7, 8)	Salsa	"La Cartera"—Larry Harlow	Safe
La Pánfila & Kevin	38 (7, 8, 7, 7, 9)	Pachanga	"Bailan Rochas y Chetas"—Nene Malo	Safe

=== Week 3: Hip-hop & Vallenato Night ===
The couples (except those sentenced) danced hip-hop or vallenato and a team dance of pachanga. In the challenge, it was decided that two members of each team would face each other, Grasse Becerra represented Team Chumbe while Sheyla Rojas represented Team Chechi, with Rojas being the winner, granting an extra point to each team member.

Running order

Couple	Scores	Dance	Music	Result
Gino & Jacqueline	40 (8, 8, 8, 7, 9)	Vallenato	"Lagartija Azul"—Fonseca	Safe
Junior & Julliana	40 (8, 7, 8, 8, 9)	Hip-hop	"I Know You Want Me (Calle Ocho)"—Pitbull	Safe
Vania & Juan	39 (8, 7, 9, 7, 8)	Vallenato	"La Gota Fría"—Carlos Vives	Safe
Mónica & Gustavo	38 (7, 8, 7, 7, 9)	Hip-hop	"Krazy"—Pitbull feat. Lil Jon	Safe
Edith & André	37 (8, 7, 7, 7, 8)	Vallenato	"Hace Tiempo"—Fonseca	Sentenced
Antonio & Yanilú	32 (6, 6, 6, 6, 8)	Disco*	"I Will Survive"—Gloria Gaynor	—
Christian & Vania	37 (7, 7, 8, 7, 8)	Merengue*	"El Loco Soy Yo"—Kinito Méndez	Safe
Sheyla & Emanuel	41 (8, 7, 9, 7, 10)	Vallenato	"Carito"—Carlos Vives	Safe
Carolina & Eduardo	45 (9, 9, 9, 8, 10)	Hip-hop	"Feel This Moment"—Pitbull feat. Christina Aguilera	Best steps
Luis & Milagros	44 (10, 9, 7, 9, 9)	Vallenato	"Pa' Mayte"—Carlos Vives	Safe
Grasse & Angelo	39 (8, 8, 8, 7, 8)	Hip-hop	"Bon, Bon"—Pitbull	Sentenced
La Pánfila & Kevin	43 (8, 8, 9, 8, 10)	Vallenato	"El Santo Cachón"—Los Embajadores Vallenatos	Safe
Luis & Milagros; Grasse & Angelo; Carolina & Eduardo; Antonio & Yanilú; Pánfila & Charles; Edith & André	0	Pachanga (Team "Chumbe")	"Cintura"—Las Wachiturras	
Vania & Juan; Christian & Vania; Gino & Jacqueline; Sheyla & Emanuel; Junior & Julliana; Mónica & Gustavo	2	Pachanga (Team "Chechi")	"Wachinanga"—El Papá	

*The duel

- Antonio & Yanilú: Eliminated (2pts)
- Christian & Vania: Safe

=== Week 4: Cumbia & Disco Night ===
The couples (except those sentenced) danced cumbia or disco and a team dance rock and roll.

Due to an injury during the rehearsals, María Victoria "La Pánfila" Santana had to withdraw the competition.

Running order

Couple	Scores	Dance	Music	Result
Junior & Julliana	39 (8, 8, 7, 7, 9)	Disco	"You Should Be Dancing"—Bee Gees	Safe
Carolina & Eduardo	44 (10, 9, 9, 8, 8)	Disco	"Never Can Say Goodbye"—Gloria Gaynor	Safe
Gino & Jacqueline	46 (9, 9, 10, 9, 9)	Disco	"Knock on Wood"—Amii Stewart	Safe
Mónica & Gustavo	41 (8, 8, 9, 7, 9)	Disco	"Boogie Wonderland"—Earth, Wind & Fire	Safe
Edith & André	36 (8, 7, 7, 6, 8)	Tango*	"In-tango"—In-Grid	Sentenced
Grasse & Angelo	41 (8, 8, 8, 8, 9)	Salsa*	"La Miradera"—La Charanga Habanera	Safe
Luis & Milagros	42 (9, 9, 8, 7, 9)	Cumbia	"Me Gusta"—Tommy Portugal y La Pasión	Safe
Vania & Juan	47 (9, 10, 10, 9, 9)	Cumbia	"La Caderona"—Los Villacorta	Best steps
Christian & Vania	37 (7, 7, 8, 7, 8)	Cumbia	"Echarte al Olvido"—Grupo Néctar	Sentenced
Sheyla & Emanuel	42 (9, 8, 9, 7, 9)	Cumbia	"La Escobita"—Marisol y La Magia del Norte	Safe
Luis & Milagros; Grasse & Angelo; Carolina & Eduardo; Pánfila & Charles; Edith & André	2	Rock and roll (Team "Chumbe")	"Rock Around the Clock"—Bill Haley & His Comets	
Vania & Juan; Christian & Vania; Gino & Jacqueline; Sheyla & Emanuel; Junior & Julliana; Mónica & Gustavo	0	Rock and roll (Team "Chechi")	"Tutti Frutti"—Little Richard	

*The duel

- Edith & André: Eliminated (but safe with the lifeguard)
- Grasse & Angelo: Safe (2pts)

=== Week 5: The '90s Night ===
The couples (except those sentenced) performed one unlearned dance to famous '90s songs. In the versus, the couples faced dancing jazz, while in the little train, only the celebrities faced dancing reggaetón.

Running order

Couple	Scores	Dance	Music	Result
Gino & Jacqueline	42 (9, 8, 9, 8, 8)	Merengue	"Está Pegao'"—Proyecto Uno	Safe
Carolina & Eduardo	43 (9, 8, 9, 8, 9)	Merengue	"Dame de Eso"—Ilegales	Safe
Junior & Julliana	44 (9, 8, 10, 8, 9)	Guaracha	"La Corneta" / "Cachita"—Alquimia la Sonora del XXI	Safe
Vania & Juan	46 (9, 9, 10, 9, 9)	Merengue	"La Cosquillita"—Juan Luis Guerra	Best steps
Edith & André	42 (8, 9, 8, 8, 9)	Latin pop*	"Explota mi corazón" / "Hay que venir al sur"—Raffaella Carrà	Safe
Christian & Vania	36 (7, 7, 7, 7, 8)	Salsa*	"Mi Gente"—Héctor Lavoe	—
Mónica & Gustavo	42 (8, 9, 8, 8, 9)	Salsa	"El Chico Chévere"—Albita Rodríguez	Safe
Sheyla & Emanuel	41 (8, 7, 9, 8, 9)	Salsa	"La Fiesta de Pilito"—El Gran Combo de Puerto Rico	Safe
Grasse & Angelo	39 (8, 8, 8, 7, 8)	Merengue	"Abusadora"—Wilfrido Vargas	Sentenced
Luis & Milagros	38 (7, 7, 8, 8, 8)	Merengue	"Como un Trueno"—Ilegales	Sentenced

The versus
Couple	Judges' votes	Dance	Music	Result
Junior & Julliana	Junior, Junior, Christian, Junior	Jazz	"Gentleman"—Psy	Winners (2 pts)
Christian & Vania	Junior, Junior, Christian, Junior	Jazz	"Gentleman"—Psy	Losers
Grasse & Angelo	Grasse, Sheyla, Grasse, Sheyla	Jazz	"Lo Hecho Está Hecho"—Shakira	Tie (1 pt)
Sheyla & Emanuel	Grasse, Sheyla, Grasse, Sheyla	Jazz	"Lo Hecho Está Hecho"—Shakira	Tie (1 pt)
Edith & André	Edith, Edith, Mónica, Mónica	Jazz	"Ojos Así"—Shakira	Tie (1 pt)
Mónica & Gustavo	Edith, Edith, Mónica, Mónica	Jazz	"Ojos Así"—Shakira	Tie (1 pt)
Carolina & Eduardo	Carolina, Vania, Vania, Carolina	Jazz	"SOS"—Rihanna	Tie (1 pt)
Vania & Juan	Carolina, Vania, Vania, Carolina	Jazz	"SOS"—Rihanna	Tie (1 pt)
Gino & Jacqueline	Gino, Gino, Gino, Luis	Jazz	"In the Middle"—Kazaky	Winners (2 pts)
Luis & Milagros	Gino, Gino, Gino, Luis	Jazz	"In the Middle"—Kazaky	Losers

The little train
Participants	Judges' votes	Dance	Music	Winner(s)
Celebrities	Gino, Luis, Gino, Gino	Reggaetón	"Follow the Leader"—Wisin & Yandel feat. Jennifer Lopez "Limbo"—Daddy Yankee	Gino (2 pts)

*The duel

- Edith & André: Safe (2pts)
- Christian & Vania: Eliminated

=== Week 6: World Dances Night ===
The couples (except those sentenced) performed the world dances and a team dance of axé. In the versus, the couples faced dancing different dance styles, while in the little train, only the celebrities faced dancing hula.

Running order

Couple	Scores	Dance	Music	Result
Junior & Julliana	40 (8, 8, 8, 7, 9)	(Spain) Rumba flamenca	"Báila Me"—Gipsy Kings	Safe
Mónica & Gustavo	37 (7, 8, 7, 6, 9)	(Cuba) Mambo	"Mambo No. 8"—Pérez Prado	Sentenced
Sheyla & Emanuel	42 (8, 8, 8, 8, 10)	(India) Bollywood	"Ishq Kamina"—Alka Yagnik & Sonu Niigaam	Safe
Luis & Milagros	45 (10, 8, 9, 8, 10)	Jazz*	"Greased Lightning"—John Travolta	Safe
Grasse & Angelo	38 (7, 8, 7, 7, 9)	Latin pop*	"Caribe"—Ángela Carrasco	—
Gino & Jacqueline	46 (10, 9, 9, 9, 9)	(United States) Country	"Cotton Eye Joe"—Rednex	Best steps
Vania & Juan	43 (9, 8, 10, 8, 8)	(Brazil) Samba	"Magalenha"—Sérgio Mendes feat. Carlinhos Brown	Best steps
Edith & André	35 (7, 7, 7, 6, 8)	(Argentina) Tango	"El Tango de Roxanne"—from Moulin Rouge!	Sentenced
Carolina & Eduardo	44 (9, 8, 9, 8, 10)	(France) Can-can	"Galop Infernal"—Vanessa-Mae	Safe
Luis & Milagros; Grasse & Angelo; Carolina & Eduardo; Edith & André	0	Axé (Team "Chumbe")	"Dança da Manivela"—Axé Bahia	
Vania & Juan; Gino & Jacqueline; Sheyla & Emanuel; Junior & Julliana; Mónica & Gustavo	2	Axé (Team "Chechi")	"Dança da Maozinha"—Axé Bahia	

The versus
Couple	Judges' votes	Dance	Music	Result
Carolina & Eduardo	Carolina, Sheyla, Carolina, Carolina	Cumbia	"El Teléfono"—Pintura Roja	Winners (2 pts)
Sheyla & Emanuel	Carolina, Sheyla, Carolina, Carolina	Cumbia	"El Teléfono"—Pintura Roja	Losers
Vania & Juan	Gino, Vania, Vania, Vania	Cumbia	"Pedazo de Luna"—Grupo Guinda	Winners (2 pts)
Gino & Jacqueline	Gino, Vania, Vania, Vania	Cumbia	"Pedazo de Luna"—Grupo Guinda	Losers
Junior & Julliana	Junior, Mónica, Junior, Junior	Pachanga	"Contigo Perú"—Los Mojarras	Winners (2 pts)
Edith & André	Junior, Mónica, Junior, Junior	Pachanga	"Contigo Perú"—Los Mojarras	Losers
Mónica & Gustavo	Junior, Mónica, Junior, Junior	Pachanga	"Contigo Perú"—Los Mojarras	Losers
Luis & Milagros	Luis, Luis, Grasse, Luis	Cumbia	"Eres Mentirosa"—Los Mirlos	Winners (2 pts)
Grasse & Angelo	Luis, Luis, Grasse, Luis	Cumbia	"Eres Mentirosa"—Los Mirlos	Losers

The little train
Participants	Judges' votes	Dance	Music	Winner(s)
Celebrities	Sheyla, Vania, Sheyla, Vania	Hula	"I Command You" / "Island Girl"—Burning Flames	Sheyla, Vania (1 pt)

*The duel

- Luis & Milagros: Safe
- Grasse & Angelo: Eliminated (2pts)

=== Week 7: The Trio '80s Night ===
The couples (except those sentenced) performed a trio ballroom dance involving another celebrity to famous '80s songs. In the versus, the couples faced dancing pachanga.

Running order

Couple (Trio Dance Partner)	Scores	Dance	Music	Result
Carolina & Eduardo (Denisse Dibós)	47 (10, 9, 10, 9, 9)	Cha-cha-cha	"Conga"—Miami Sound Machine	Best steps
Gino & Jacqueline (Claudia Portocarrero)	42 (9, 8, 8, 8, 9)	Paso doble	"Thriller"—Michael Jackson	Safe
Vania & Juan (Jhoany Vegas)	39 (8, 8, 8, 7, 8)	Cha-cha-cha	"Like a Virgin"—Madonna	Sentenced
Mónica & Gustavo	42 (8, 8, 8, 8, 10)	Salsa*	"Mi Primera Rumba"—La India "Bambarakatunga"—Celia Cruz & Ray Barretto	Safe
Edith & André	39 (8, 8, 8, 7, 8)	Jazz*	"Poker Face" / "Born This Way"—Lady Gaga	—
Sheyla & Emanuel (Karen Dejo)	43 (9, 8, 9, 8, 9)	Cha-cha-cha	"Flashdance... What a Feeling"—Irene Cara	Safe
Junior & Julliana (Areliz Benel)	42 (8, 8, 9, 8, 9)	Samba	"You Spin Me Round"—Dead or Alive	Sentenced
Luis & Milagros (Tati Alcántara)	45 (9, 9, 9, 8, 10)	Jive	"Walk Like an Egyptian"—The Bangles	Safe

The versus
Couple	Judges' votes	Dance	Music	Result
Luis & Milagros	Luis, Luis, Luis, Luis	Pachanga	"Bam Bam"—Los Rabanes	Winners (2 pts)
Junior & Julliana	Luis, Luis, Luis, Luis	Pachanga	"Bam Bam"—Los Rabanes	Losers
Mónica & Gustavo	Edith, Edith, Mónica, Mónica	Pachanga	"El Murguero"—Los Auténticos Decadentes	Tie (1 pt)
Edith & André	Edith, Edith, Mónica, Mónica	Pachanga	"El Murguero"—Los Auténticos Decadentes	Tie (1 pt)
Gino & Jacqueline	Gino, Gino, Gino, Gino	Pachanga	"Veo Veo"—Los Guajiros del Puerto	Winners (2 pts)
Vania & Juan	Gino, Gino, Gino, Gino	Pachanga	"Veo Veo"—Los Guajiros del Puerto	Losers
Carolina & Eduardo	Carolina, Carlina, Carolina, Carolina	Pachanga	"Inténtalo (Me Prende)"—3Ball MTY feat. El Bebeto y América Sierra	Winners (2 pts)
Sheyla & Emanuel	Carolina, Carlina, Carolina, Carolina	Pachanga	"Inténtalo (Me Prende)"—3Ball MTY feat. El Bebeto y América Sierra	Losers

*The duel

- Mónica & Gustavo: Safe (2pts)
- Edith & André: Eliminated

=== Week 8: Salsa Night ===
The couples (except those sentenced) danced salsa and a danceathon of salsa. In the versus, the couples faced dancing different dance styles.

Running order

Couple	Scores	Dance	Music	Result
Sheyla & Emanuel	43 (9, 8, 10, 8, 8)	Salsa	"El Todopoderoso"—Héctor Lavoe	Safe
Luis & Milagros	38 (8, 7, 8, 8, 7)	Salsa	"Ven Morena"—Oscar D'León	Sentenced
Vania & Juan	43 (9, 9, 9, 9, 7)	Reggaeton*	"Limbo" / "Gasolina"—Daddy Yankee	Safe
Junior & Julliana	41 (8, 8, 9, 8, 8)	Merengue*	"Tamarindo"—Kinito Mendez / "Chicharrón"—Oro Solido	Sentenced
Mónica & Gustavo	44 (9, 9, 9, 9, 8)	Salsa	"Que Se Sepa"—Roberto Roena	Best steps
Gino & Jacqueline	44 (9, 9, 9, 8, 9)	Salsa	"Temba, Tumba, Timba"—Los Van Van	Safe
Carolina & Eduardo	48 (10, 10, 10, 9, 9)	Salsa	"Timbalero"—El Gran Combo de Puerto Rico	Best steps
Luis & Milagros; Vania & Juan; Carolina & Eduardo; Gino & Jacqueline; Sheyla & Emanuel; Junior & Julliana; Mónica & Gustavo	2	Salsa (The danceathon)	"Tú Me Quemas" / "Lluvia"—Eddie Santiago	

The versus
Couple	Judges' votes	Dance	Music	Result
Vania & Juan	Vania, Vania, Vania, Junior	Punta	"Fiesta"—Banda Blanca	Winners (2 pts)
Junior & Julliana	Vania, Vania, Vania, Junior	Punta	"Sopa de Caracol"—Banda Blanca	Losers
Gino & Jacqueline	Carolina, Gino, Gino, Gino	Merengue house	"Taqui Taqui"—Ilegales	Winners (2 pts)
Carolina & Eduardo	Carolina, Gino, Gino, Gino	Merengue house	"El Tiburón"—Proyecto Uno	Losers
Mónica & Gustavo	Mónica, Mónica, Sheyla, Luis	Merengue	"Tu la Tienes que Pagar"—Natusha	Winners (2 pts)
Sheyla & Emanuel	Mónica, Mónica, Sheyla, Luis	Merengue	"Zúmbalo"—Los Melódicos	Losers
Luis & Milagros	Mónica, Mónica, Sheyla, Luis	Merengue	"Mentiritas"—Karolina	Losers

*The duel

- Vania & Juan: Safe (2pts)
- Junior & Julliana: Eliminated (but safe with the lifeguard)

=== Week 9: Party Night ===
The couples danced cumbia or tex-mex (except those sentenced) and adagio.

Running order

Couple	Scores	Dance	Music	Result
Mónica & Gustavo	38 (7, 8, 8, 7, 8)	Tex-mex	"Como la Flor"—Selena	Sentenced
Mónica & Gustavo	36 (7, 8, 7, 7, 7)	Adagio	"Para Dormir Contigo"—Aranza	Sentenced
Carolina & Eduardo	44 (9, 9, 9, 8, 9)	Cumbia	"Mentirosa"—Ráfaga	Best steps
Carolina & Eduardo	49 (10, 10, 10, 10, 9)	Adagio	"Hoy Tengo Ganas de Ti"—Alejandro Fernández feat. Christina Aguilera	Best steps
Junior & Julliana	39 (8, 7, 9, 7, 8)	Mambo*	"Cuban Pete"—Desi Arnaz	—
Junior & Julliana	39 (7, 8, 7, 8, 9)	Adagio	"Atado a Tu Amor"—Chayanne	—
Luis & Milagros	46 (9, 9, 9, 9, 10)	Jazz*	"What Time Is It?"—from High School Musical	Safe
Luis & Milagros	43 (9, 8, 9, 8, 9)	Adagio	"Víveme"—Laura Pausini	Safe
Gino & Jacqueline	41 (8, 9, 8, 8, 8)	Tex-mex	"No Tengo Dinero"—Kumbia Kings feat. Juan Gabriel y El Gran Silencio	Safe
Gino & Jacqueline	42 (10, 7, 8, 8, 9)	Adagio	"Abrázame Muy Fuerte"—Juan Gabriel	Safe
Sheyla & Emanuel	41 (8, 8, 9, 8, 8)	Cumbia	"Luna"—Ráfaga	Safe
Sheyla & Emanuel	43 (8, 9, 8, 9, 9)	Adagio	"La Cima del Cielo"—Ricardo Montaner	Safe
Vania & Juan	42 (8, 8, 9, 8, 9)	Tex-mex	"El Chico del Apartamento 512"—Selena	Sentenced
Vania & Juan	41 (8, 8, 8, 8, 9)	Adagio	"Sola"—Jorge Rigó	Sentenced

*The duel

- Junior & Julliana: Eliminated
- Luis & Milagros: Safe (2pts)

=== Week 10: Quarterfinals ===
The couples performed a trio cha-cha-cha involving another celebrity (except those sentenced), merengue and a danceathon of cumbia.

Running order

Couple (Trio Dance Partner)	Scores	Dance	Music	Result
Luis & Milagros (Korina Rivadeneira)	44 (8, 8, 10, 8, 10)	Cha-cha-cha	"Dímelo"—Marc Anthony	Sentenced
Luis & Milagros (Korina Rivadeneira)	41 (8, 8, 8, 8, 9)	Merengue	"La Dueña del Swing"—Los Hermanos Rosario	Sentenced
Carolina & Eduardo (Raúl Zuazo)	44 (9, 9, 9, 8, 9)	Cha-cha-cha	"La Llave de Mi Corazón"—Juan Luis Guerra	Best steps
Carolina & Eduardo (Raúl Zuazo)	46 (10, 8, 10, 9, 9)	Merengue	"Guayando"—Fulanito	Best steps
Mónica & Gustavo	39 (7, 8, 8, 7, 9)	Jazz*	"You Can't Stop the Beat"—from Hairspray	—
Mónica & Gustavo	37 (6, 7, 8, 8, 8)	Merengue	"Rompecintura"—Los Hermanos Rosario	—
Vania & Juan	46 (9, 9, 10, 9, 9)	Strip dance*	"Toxic"—Britney Spears	Sentenced
Vania & Juan	40 (8, 8, 9, 7, 8)	Merengue	"El Ombliguito"—La Coco Band	Sentenced
Gino & Jacqueline (Micheille Soifer)	43 (9, 9, 9, 8, 8)	Cha-cha-cha	"Traigo una Pena"—Franco De Vita feat. Víctor Manuelle	Best steps
Gino & Jacqueline (Micheille Soifer)	45 (9, 10, 10, 8, 8)	Merengue	"Es mentiroso"—Olga Tañon	Best steps
Sheyla & Emanuel (Mayra Goñi)	39 (7, 8, 8, 8, 8)	Cha-cha-cha	"Falsas Esperanzas"—Christina Aguilera	Safe
Sheyla & Emanuel (Mayra Goñi)	43 (9, 9, 9, 7, 9)	Merengue	"Sua sua"—Kinito Méndez	Safe
Luis & Milagros; Vania & Juan; Carolina & Eduardo; Gino & Jacqueline; Sheyla & Emanuel; Mónica & Gustavo	2	Cumbia (The danceathon)	"Medley de Cumbia"—Cumbia Stars	

*The duel

- Mónica & Gustavo: Eliminated
- Vania & Juan: Safe (2pts)

=== Week 11: Semifinals ===
The couples performed strip dance, a fusion dance that fused two dance styles (except those sentenced) and a danceathon of salsa. In the little train, the participants faced dancing festejo or danza de tijeras.

Running order

Couple	Scores	Dance	Music	Result
Carolina & Eduardo	43 (10, 8, 7, 9, 9)	Strip dance	"Lady Marmalade"—Christina Aguilera, Lil' Kim, Mýa & Pink	Best steps
Carolina & Eduardo	48 (10, 10, 10, 9, 9)	Cha-cha-cha; Samba	"Arrasando"—Thalía	Best steps
Vania & Juan	42 (9, 8, 10, 8, 7)	Strip dance	"American Woman"—Lenny Kravitz	Sentenced
Vania & Juan	42 (9, 8, 9, 8, 8)	Salsa*	"Aguanile"—Marc Anthony "Acere Ko"—La Sonora Ponceña	Sentenced
Luis & Milagros	43 (8, 9, 8, 9, 9)	Strip dance	"Sweet Dreams (Are Made of This)"—Eurythmics	—
Luis & Milagros	45 (9, 9, 8, 8, 10)	Jazz*	"Thriller"—Michael Jackson "Heads Will Roll"—Yeah Yeah Yeahs	—
Gino & Jacqueline	42 (9, 8, 8, 8, 9)	Strip dance	"(I Can't Get No) Satisfaction"—The Rolling Stones	Safe
Gino & Jacqueline	45 (9, 10, 9, 9, 8)	Cha-cha-cha; Salsa	"Salomé"—Chayanne	Safe
Sheyla & Emanuel	42 (8, 8, 8, 9, 9)	Strip dance	"I Love Rock 'N Roll"—Joan Jett & the Blackhearts	Sentenced
Sheyla & Emanuel	42 (8, 8, 10, 8, 8)	Salsa; Samba	"María"—Ricky Martin	Sentenced
Luis & Milagros; Vania & Juan; Carolina & Eduardo; Gino & Jacqueline; Sheyla & Emanuel	2	Salsa (The danceathon)	"Vivir Mi Vida"—Marc Anthony	

The little train
Participants	Judges' votes	Dance	Music	Winner(s)
Women	Milagros, Vania, Vania, Jacqueline	Festejo	"Ingá"—Eva Ayllón	Vania (2 pts)
Men	Juan, Eduardo, Emanuel, Juan	Danza de tijeras	"Carnaval"	Juan (2 pts)

*The duel

- Vania & Juan: Safe (2pts)
- Luis & Milagros: Eliminated

=== Week 12: Finals ===
On the first part, the couples danced a favorite dance and a freestyle performed in a rotating room.

On the second part, the final three couples danced quickstep.

Running order (Part 1)

Couple	Scores (Note: In this week, there was no secret vote because the winner was chosen by the votes of the public.)	Dance	Music	Result
Vania & Juan	46 (9, 9, 10, 8, 10)	Festejo*	"Ritmo, Color y Sabor" / "Raíces del Festejo"—Eva Ayllón	Eliminated
Vania & Juan	46 (10, 8, 9, 9, 10)	Freestyle	"4 Minutes"—Madonna feat. Justin Timberlake y Timbaland	Eliminated
Sheyla & Emanuel	44 (9, 8, 9, 8, 10)	Bollywood*	"Jai Ho! (You Are My Destiny)"—A. R. Rahman & The Pussycat Dolls	Safe
Sheyla & Emanuel	44 (8, 9, 9, 8, 10)	Freestyle	"Poker Face"—Lady Gaga	Safe
Gino & Jacqueline	49 (10, 10, 10, 9, 10)	Hip-hop	"Move Shake Drop"—DJ Laz feat. Flo Rida, Casely y Pitbull	—
Gino & Jacqueline	48 (10, 10, 9, 9, 10)	Freestyle	"Pop"—NSYNC	—
Carolina & Eduardo	47 (10, 9, 9, 9, 10)	Jazz	"Le Jazz Hot!"—from Victor/Victoria	—
Carolina & Eduardo	46 (9, 9, 9, 9, 10)	Freestyle	"3"—Britney Spears	—

Running order (Part 2)

Couple	Scores	Dance	Music	Result
Sheyla & Emanuel	43 (8, 8, 9, 8, 10)	Quickstep	"Hot Honey Rag"—from Chicago	Runner-up
Gino & Jacqueline	46 (9, 9, 9, 9, 10)	Quickstep	"Sing, Sing, Sing (With a Swing)"—Benny Goodman	Winners
Carolina & Eduardo	49 (10, 10, 10, 9, 10)	Quickstep	"The Boggie Bumper"—Big Bad Voodoo Daddy	Third place

== Dance chart ==
The celebrities and professional partners will dance one of these routines for each corresponding week:

- Week 1: Cumbia, latin pop, pachanga, jazz, reggaeton or salsa (First Dances)
- Week 2: One unlearned dance (Celebrity's Pick Night)
- Week 3: Hip-Hop or vallenato & team dances (Hip-hop & Vallenato Night)
- Week 4: Cumbia or disco & team dances (Cumbia & Disco Night)
- Week 5: One unlearned dance, the versus & the little train (The '90s Night)
- Week 6: One unlearned dance, team dances, the versus & the little train (World Dances Night)
- Week 7: Trio ballroom dances & the versus (The Trio '80s Night)
- Week 8: Salsa, the danceathon & the versus (Salsa Night)
- Week 9: Cumbia or tex-mex & adagio (Party Night)
- Week 10: Trio Cha-cha-cha, merengue & the danceathon (Quarterfinals)
- Week 11: Strip dance, fusion dance, the danceathon & the little train (Semifinals)
- Week 12: Favorite dance, freestyle & Quickstep (Finals)

Couple	Week 1	Week 2	Week 3	Week 4	Week 5	Week 6	Week 7	Week 8	Week 9		Week 10		Week 11		Week 12		
Gino & Jacqueline	Reggaeton	Latin pop	Vallenato	Disco	Merengue	Country	Paso doble	Salsa	Tex-mex	Adagio	Cha-cha-cha	Merengue	Strip dance	Cha-cha-cha; Salsa	Hip-hop	Freestyle	Quickstep
Sheyla & Emanuel	Pachanga	Latin pop	Vallenato	Cumbia	Salsa	Bollywood	Cha-cha-cha	Salsa	Cumbia	Adagio	Cha-cha-cha	Merengue	Strip dance	Salsa; Samba	Bollywood	Freestyle	Quickstep
Carolina & Eduardo	Pachanga	Latin pop	Hip-hop	Disco	Merengue	Can-can	Cha-cha-cha	Salsa	Cumbia	Adagio	Cha-cha-cha	Merengue	Strip dance	Cha-cha-cha; Samba	Jazz	Freestyle	Quickstep
Vania & Juan	Cumbia	Jazz	Vallenato	Cumbia	Merengue	Samba	Cha-cha-cha	Reggaeton	Tex-mex	Adagio	Strip dance	Merengue	Strip dance	Salsa	Festejo	Freestyle	
Luis & Milagros	Latin pop	Reggaeton	Vallenato	Cumbia	Merengue	Jazz	Jive	Salsa	Jazz	Adagio	Cha-cha-cha	Merengue	Strip dance	Jazz			
Mónica & Gustavo	Latin pop	Salsa	Hip-hop	Disco	Salsa	Mambo	Salsa	Salsa	Tex-mex	Adagio	Jazz	Merengue					
Junior & Julliana	Salsa	Cumbia	Hip-hop	Disco	Guaracha	Rumba flamenca	Samba	Merengue	Mambo	Adagio							
Edith & André	Jazz	Salsa	Vallenato	Tango	Latin pop	Tango	Jazz										
Grasse & Angelo	Latin pop	Cumbia	Hip-hop	Salsa	Merengue	Latin pop											
Christian & Vania	Salsa	Reggaeton	Merengue	Cumbia	Salsa												
La Pánfila & Kevin	Cumbia	Pachanga	Vallenato														
Antonio & Yanilú	Latin pop	Salsa	Disco														

Modalities of competition
Couple	Week 3	Week 4	Week 5		Week 6			Week 7	Week 8		Week 10	Week 11		
Gino & Jacqueline	Pachanga	Rock and roll	Jazz	Reggaeton	Axé	Cumbia	Hula	Pachanga	Salsa	Merengue house	Cumbia	Salsa	Festejo	Danza de tijeras
Sheyla & Emanuel	Pachanga	Rock and roll	Jazz	Reggaeton	Axé	Cumbia	Hula	Pachanga	Salsa	Merengue	Cumbia	Salsa	Festejo	Danza de tijeras
Carolina & Eduardo	Pachanga	Rock and roll	Jazz	Reggaeton	Axé	Cumbia	Hula	Pachanga	Salsa	Merengue house	Cumbia	Salsa	Festejo	Danza de tijeras
Vania & Juan	Pachanga	Rock and roll	Jazz	Reggaeton	Axé	Cumbia	Hula	Pachanga	Salsa	Punta	Cumbia	Salsa	Festejo	Danza de tijeras
Luis & Milagros	Pachanga	Rock and roll	Jazz	Reggaeton	Axé	Cumbia	Hula	Pachanga	Salsa	Merengue	Cumbia	Salsa	Festejo	Danza de tijeras
Mónica & Gustavo	Pachanga	Rock and roll	Jazz	Reggaeton	Axé	Pachanga	Hula	Pachanga	Salsa	Merengue	Cumbia			
Junior & Julliana	Pachanga	Rock and roll	Jazz	Reggaeton	Axé	Pachanga	Hula	Pachanga	Salsa	Punta				
Edith & André	Pachanga	Rock and roll	Jazz	Reggaeton	Axé	Pachanga	Hula	Pachanga						
Grasse & Angelo	Pachanga	Rock and roll	Jazz	Reggaeton	Axé	Cumbia	Hula							
Christian & Vania	Pachanga	Rock and roll	Jazz	Reggaeton										
La Pánfila & Kevin	Pachanga													
Antonio & Yanilú	Pachanga													

Highest scoring dance
Lowest scoring dance
Gained bonus points for winning this dance
Gained no bonus points for losing this dance
In Italic indicate the dances performed in the duel
