= El Gran Show season 12 =

El Gran Show
- Season 12
- Hosted by: Gisela Valcárcel; Aldo Díaz; Francisco "Paco" Bazán
- Judges: Morella Petrozzi; Pachi Valle Riestra; Carlos Cacho; Max Suffrau
- Celebrity winner: Melissa Loza
- Professional winner: Sergio Álvarez
- No. of episodes: 12

Release
- Original network: América Televisión
- Original release: May 16 – August 1, 2015

Season chronology
- ← Previous; Season 11 Next → Season 13

Season one of the 2015 edition of El Gran Show premiered on May 16, 2015.

The show returned after a year of absence, returning with the original format of dreamers instead of professional dancers. Also, the duel returned to its original format.

On August 1, 2015, model & reality TV star Melissa Loza and her dreamer Sergio Álvarez were declared the winners, actor & comedian Franco Cabrera and Pierina Neira finished second, while axé star Brenda Carvalho and Irving Figueroa finished third.

== Cast ==
=== Couples ===
On May 16, 2015, 12 celebrities were presented in a special program for the return of the show, with the dreamers presented in first place. Mauricio Diez Canseco, one of the celebrities announced in the show, had to withdraw from the competition before it started due to an injury, so he was replaced by Sebastian Lizarzaburu.

During the show, Al Fondo Hay Sitio actress Magdyel Ugaz decided to withdraw the competition due to personal issues, being replaced since week 7 by Mayra Couto.

Celebrity	Notability (known for)	Dreamer	Status	Ref.
Sebastián Lizarzaburu	Model & reality TV star	Katherine Juarez	Eliminated 1st on June 6, 2015	
Carlos Álvarez	Comedian	July Vásquez	Eliminated 2nd on June 13, 2015	
Julio "Coyote" Rivera	Former football player	Daniela Guzmán	Eliminated 3rd on June 27, 2015	
Mathías Brivio	Journalist & TV host	Claire Neyra	Eliminated 4th on July 4, 2015	
Pedro Pablo de Vinatea	Paralympic badminton player	Keyla Bravo	Eliminated 5th on July 11, 2015	
Saskia Bernaola	Actress & comedian	Pedro Vargas	Eliminated 6th on July 18, 2015	
Janet Barboza	TV host	Fernando Pallardelly	Eliminated 7th on August 1, 2015	
Mayra Couto	Al Fondo Hay Sitio actress	Daonil Vargas	Eliminated 8th on August 1, 2015	
María Grazia Gamarra	Actress	Billy Gonzáles	Eliminated 9th on August 1, 2015	
Brenda Carvalho	Axé star	Irving Figueroa	Third place on August 1, 2015	
Franco Cabrera	Actor & comedian	Pierina Neira	Runner-up on August 1, 2015	
Melissa Loza	Model & reality TV star	Sergio Álvarez	Winners on August 1, 2015	

=== Hosts and judges ===
Gisela Valcárcel, Aldo Díaz, Paco Bazán returned as hosts, while Gachi Rivero not returned. Morella Petrozzi, Pachi Valle Riestra and the VIP Jury returned as judges. Phillip Butters did not return as a judge, being replaced by art director Max Suffrau. At first, Carlos Cacho did not return to the show, but in the sixth week it announced his return as judge.

== Scoring charts ==
Couple	Place	1	2	3	4	5	6	7	8	9	10	11	
Couple	Place	1	2	3	4	5	6	7	8	9	10	Top 6	Top 4
Melissa & Sergio	1	33	31	34	37	39	40	36	36	44	91	40	+38=78
Franco & Pierina	2	33	35	35	39	36	43	35	38	38	91	38	+36=74
Brenda & Irving	3	35	36	37	38	38	43	37	29	44	91	40	+39=79
María Grazia & Billy	4	26	33	33	30	37	48	34	33	32	83	36	+35=71
Mayra & Daonil	5	28	30	32	32	34	41	28	29	44	86	36	
Janet & Fernando	6	27	27	31	27	30	36	25	27	33	67	30	
Saskia & Pedro	7	31	31	29	36	32	33	29	26	36			
Pedro Pablo & Keyla	8	29	30	34	31	36	34	24	28				
Mathías & Claire	9	26	29	29	29	30	31	19					
Coyote & Daniela	10	27	30	30	32	30	36						
Carlos & July	11	28	29	28	31								
Sebastián & Katherine	12	24	26	29									

Red numbers indicate the sentenced for each week
Green numbers indicate the best steps for each week
the couple eliminated that week
the couple was saved in the duel
the couple eliminated that week but saved with a lifeguard
the winning couple
the runner-up couple
the third-place couple

=== Average score chart ===
This table only counts dances scored on a 40-point scale.

Rank by average	Place	Couple	Total points	Number of dances	Average
1	3	Brenda & Irving	470	13	36.2
2	1	Melissa & Sergio	459	13	35.3
3	2	Franco & Pierina	456	13	35.1
4	4	María Grazia & Billy	421	13	32.4
5	5	Mayra & Daonil	387	12	32.3
6	8	Pedro Pablo & Keyla	239	8	29.9
7	7	Saskia & Pedro	265	9	29.4
8	10	Coyote & Daniela	176	6	29.3
9	11	Carlos & July	116	4	29.0
10	6	Janet & Fernando	326	12	27.2
11	9	Mathías & Claire	190	7	27.1
12	12	Sebastián & Katherine	79	3	26.3

=== Highest and lowest scoring performances ===
The best and worst performances in each dance according to the judges' 40-point scale are as follows:

Dance	Highest scored dancer(s)	Highest score	Lowest scored dancer(s)	Lowest score
Merengue	Franco Cabrera; Melissa Loza	39	Janet Barboza	27
Cumbia	Brenda Carvalho	36	Janet Barboza	24
Hip-hop	Melissa Loza	33	Sebastián Lizarzaburu	24
Salsa	Brenda Carvalho	37	Janet Barboza	27
Disco	Melissa Loza; Brenda Carvalho	36	Janet Barboza	25
Jazz	Saskia Bernaola	36	Mathías Brivio	23
Saya	Carlos Álvarez	31	—	—
Latin pop	Brenda Carvalho	38	Saskia Bernaola	29
Tango	Brenda Carvalho	34	Janet Barboza	30
World dances	María Grazia Gamarra	37	Saskia Bernaola	24
Festejo	María Grazia Gamarra	30	Janet Barboza	25
Mambo	Mathías Brivio	24	—	—
Adagio	Franco Cabrera	36	Janet Barboza	27
Strip dance	Melissa Loza	37	María Grazia Gamarra	22
Bachata	Franco Cabrera	37	—	—
Rumba	Mayra Couto	34	—	—
Cha-cha-cha	Brenda Carvalho	40	Janet Barboza	27
Freestyle	Brenda Carvalho; Melissa Loza	40	Janet Barboza	30
Quickstep	Brenda Carvalho	39	María Grazia Gamarra	35

=== Couples' highest and lowest scoring dances ===
Scores are based upon a potential 40-point maximum.

Couples	Highest scoring dance(s)	Lowest scoring dance(s)
Melissa & Sergio	Freestyle (40)	Cumbia & Belly dance (31)
Franco & Pierina	Merengue (39)	Strip dance (29)
Brenda & Irving	Cha-cha-cha & Freestyle (40)	Adagio (31)
María Grazia & Billy	Latin pop & Marinera (37)	Strip dance (22)
Mayra & Daonil	Jazz (36)	Merengue (28)
Janet & Fernando	Cumbia (31)	Cumbia (24)
Saskia & Pedro	Jazz (36)	Lambada (24)
Pedro Pablo & Keyla	Merengue (36)	Paso doble (25)
Mathías & Claire	Jazz (30)	Jazz (24)
Coyote & Daniela	Merengue (32)	Cumbia & Festejo (27)
Carlos & July	Saya (31)	Disco & Salsa (28)
Sebastián & Katherine	Disco (29)	Hip-hop (24)

== Weekly scores ==
Individual judges' scores in the charts below (given in parentheses) are listed in this order from left to right: Morella Petrozzi, Max Suffrau, Pachi Valle Riestra, VIP Jury.

=== Week 1: First Dances ===
The couples danced cumbia, disco, hip-hop, merengue or salsa. This week, none couples were sentenced.

Running order

Couple	Scores	Dance	Music	Result
Magdyel & Daonil	28 (5, 6, 7, 10)	Merengue	"El Caballito de Palo"—Joseph Fonseca	Safe
Saskia & Pedro	31 (7, 6, 8, 10)	Merengue	"La Cosquillita"—Juan Luis Guerra	Safe
Coyote & Daniela	27 (6, 5, 7, 9)	Cumbia	"Motor y Motivo"—Grupo 5	Safe
Mathías & Claire	26 (4, 6, 6, 10)	Hip-hop	"El Taxi"—Pitbull feat. Sensato & Osmani García	Safe
Brenda & Irving	35 (8, 9, 8, 10)	Salsa	"En Barranquilla Me Quedo"—Joe Arroyo	Best steps
Janet & Fernando	27 (6, 5, 6, 10)	Salsa	"Tu Cariñito"—Puerto Rican Power	Safe
Sebastián & Katherine	24 (5, 4, 5, 10)	Hip-hop	"Quema, Quema"—Aldo y Dandy	Safe
María Grazia & Billy	26 (6, 4, 7, 9)	Disco	"Flashdance... What a Feeling"—Irene Cara	Safe
Carlos & July	28 (6, 5, 7, 10)	Disco	"Boogie Wonderland"—Earth, Wind & Fire	Safe
Franco & Pierina	33 (8, 7, 8, 10)	Salsa	"Aguanile"—Marc Anthony	Safe
Pedro Pablo & Keyla	29 (7, 6, 6, 10)	Merengue	"Bailando"—Enrique Iglesias feat. Descemer Bueno & Gente de Zona	Safe
Melissa & Sergio	33 (8, 8, 7, 10)	Hip-Hop	"Dirrty"—Christina Aguilera feat. Redman	Safe

=== Week 2: Cumbia Night ===
The couples dance cumbia.

Running order

Couple	Scores	Dance	Music	Result
Janet & Fernando	27 (6, 6, 5, 10)	Cumbia	"Mentirosa"—Ráfaga	Sentenced
Mathías & Claire	29 (6, 6, 7, 10)	Cumbia	"El Arbolito"—Grupo Néctar	Safe
María Grazia & Billy	33 (7, 8, 8, 10)	Cumbia	"Canalla"—Marisol y La Magia del Norte	Safe
Magdyel & Daonil	30 (6, 7, 7, 10)	Cumbia	"Sangre Caliente—Euforia	Safe
Pedro Pablo & Keyla	30 (6, 9, 5, 10)	Cumbia	"El Cervecero"—Armonía 10	Safe
Melissa & Sergio	31 (7, 7, 7, 10)	Cumbia	"Así Son los Hombres"—Marina Yafac	Safe
Sebastián & Katherine	26 (6, 5, 5, 10)	Cumbia	"Viento"—Chacalón	Sentenced
Saskia & Pedro	31 (6, 9, 6, 10)	Cumbia	"Te Vas, Te Vas"—Grupo 5	Safe
Coyote & Daniela	30 (7, 7, 6, 10)	Cumbia	"La Culebrítica"—Grupo 5	Safe
Franco & Pierina	35 (9, 8, 8, 10)	Cumbia	"La Ricotona"—Armonía 10	Safe
Carlos & July	29 (7, 7, 5, 10)	Cumbia	"Solamente un Amor"—Marisol y La Magia del Norte	Safe
Brenda & Irving	36 (8, 9, 9, 10)	Cumbia	"Siqui Siqui"—Euforia	Best steps

=== Week 3: Salsa Night ===
The couples (except those sentenced) danced salsa.

Running order

Couple	Scores	Dance	Music	Result
Carlos & July	28 (5, 8, 7, 8)	Salsa	"Y Tú Quieres Que Te Den"—Adalberto Álvarez	Sentenced
Melissa & Sergio	34 (9, 8, 8, 9)	Salsa	"Ven Morena"—Oscar D'León	Safe
Sebastián & Katherine	29 (6, 7, 7, 9)	Disco*	"Stayin' Alive"—Bee Gees	—
Janet & Fernando	31 (7, 7, 8, 9)	Cumbia*	"Cariñito"—Los Hijos del Sol	Safe
Magdyel & Daonil	32 (7, 8, 8, 9)	Salsa	"Valió la Pena"—Marc Anthony	Safe
Coyote & Daniela	30 (6, 7, 8, 9)	Salsa	"Rumbera"—Willy Chirino	Safe
Saskia & Pedro	29 (6, 8, 6, 9)	Salsa	"Brujería"—El Gran Combo de Puerto Rico	Sentenced
Brenda & Irving	37 (10, 9, 9, 9)	Salsa	"Que Se Sepa"—Roberto Roena	Best steps
Franco & Pierina	35 (9, 9, 8, 9)	Salsa	"Quimbara"—Celia Cruz feat. Johnny Pacheco	Safe
María Grazia & Billy	33 (9, 8, 8, 8)	Salsa	"Que Manera de Quererte"—Gilberto Santa Rosa	Safe
Pedro Pablo & Keyla	34 (8, 9, 8, 9)	Salsa	"Vivir Mi Vida"—Marc Anthony	Safe
Mathías & Claire	29 (6, 7, 7, 9)	Salsa	"Juana Magdalena"—La Charanga Habanera	Sentenced

=== Week 4: Merengue Night ===
The couples (except those sentenced) danced merengue.

Running order

Couple	Scores	Dance	Music	Result
María Grazia & Billy	30 (7, 7, 7, 9)	Merengue	"La Loba"—Miriam Cruz y las Chicas	Safe
Pedro Pablo & Keyla	31 (7, 7, 7, 10)	Merengue	"Mi Niña Bonita"—Lucho & César	Safe
Magdyel & Daonil	32 (8, 7, 8, 9)	Merengue	"Muchacho Malo"—Olga Tañon	Safe
Brenda & Irving	38 (10, 10, 9, 9)	Merengue	"Robi-Rob's Boriqua Anthem ('96 Remix)"—Robi Rob's Clubworld	Safe
Saskia & Pedro	36 (10, 8, 8, 10)	Jazz*	"Waka Waka (Esto es África)"—Shakira	Safe
Carlos & July	31 (7, 7, 8, 9)	Saya*	"Negrita"—Los Kjarkas	—
Mathías & Claire	29 (7, 7, 6, 9)	Hip-hop*	"Funkete"—El General	Sentenced
Melissa & Sergio	37 (10, 10, 8, 9)	Merengue	"Pégate"—Ricky Martin	Safe
Janet & Fernando	27 (7, 6, 6, 8)	Merengue	"La Reina del Swing"—Los Hermanos Rosario	Sentenced
Franco & Pierina	39 (9, 10, 10, 10)	Merengue	"Chicharrón"—Merenglass	Best steps
Coyote & Daniela	32 (8, 7, 8, 9)	Merengue	"Ya Me Cansé"—Olga Tañon	Safe

=== Week 5: The 90's Night ===
The couples (except those sentenced) performed one unlearned dance to famous '90s songs.

Running order

Couple	Scores	Dance	Music	Result
Coyote & Daniela	30 (8, 8, 6, 8)	Salsa	"La Vida Es Un Carnaval"—Celia Cruz	Sentenced
Franco & Pierina	36 (9, 9, 9, 9)	Latin pop	"Livin' la Vida Loca"—Ricky Martin	Safe
Melissa & Sergio	39 (10, 10, 10, 9)	Merengue	"La Morena"—Los Ilegales	Best steps
Janet & Fernando	30 (8, 8, 6, 8)	Tango*	"El Tango de Roxanne"—from Moulin Rouge!	Sentenced
Mathías & Claire	30 (8, 8, 5, 9)	Jazz*	"You Can't Stop the Beat"—from Hairspray	Sentenced
Saskia & Pedro	32 (8, 8, 7, 9)	Latin pop	"Te Aviso, Te Anuncio (Tango)"—Shakira	Safe
Magdyel & Daonil	34 (8, 9, 8, 9)	Latin pop	"Boom Boom"—Chayanne	Safe
María Grazia & Billy	37 (10, 9, 9, 9)	Latin pop	"Mujer Latina"—Thalía	Safe
Pedro Pablo & Keyla	36 (9, 9, 9, 9)	Merengue	"Como un Trueno"—Los Ilegales	Safe
Brenda & Irving	38 (10, 9, 10, 9)	Latin pop	"Salomé"—Chayanne	Safe

=== Week 6: World Dances Night ===
Individual judges' scores in the charts below (given in parentheses) are listed in this order from left to right: Morella Petrozzi, Max Suffrau, Pachi Valle Riestra, Carlos Cacho, VIP Jury.

The couples (except those sentenced) performed the world dances and a danceathon of salsa, where the couples danced with a different partner selected by the production, the winning couple earned two points, this added to the score obtained with their original partners.

Due to personal issues, Brenda Carvalho did not arrive in time for the danceathon, reason why Belén Estévez replaced her.

Running order

Couple	Scores	Dance	Music	Result
Melissa & Sergio	40 (8, 10, 7, 6, 9)	(Turkey) Belly dance	"Maktub" / "Ritm Solo 1" / "Crescendo"—Various Artists	Safe
Pedro Pablo & Keyla	34 (7, 7, 6, 5, 9)	(Spain) Paso doble	"España cañí"—Pascual Marquina Narro	Safe
Mathías & Claire	31 (6, 7, 5, 5, 8)	Jazz*	"Jailhouse Rock"—Elvis Presley	Sentenced
Janet & Fernando	34 (6, 8, 6, 6, 8)	Jazz*	"Man! I Feel Like a Woman!"—Shania Twain	Safe
Coyote & Daniela	36 (6, 8, 7, 6, 9)	Festejo*	"Festejo de la Libertad"—Peloteros Jaraneros	—
Brenda & Irving	43 (10, 8, 8, 8, 9)	(Argentina) Tango	"Por una Cabeza"—Carlos Gardel & Alfredo Le Pera	Safe
Franco & Pierina	43 (9, 9, 9, 7, 9)	(South Korea) K-pop	"Bang, Bang, Bang"—Big Bang	Safe
María Grazia & Billy	46 (10, 10, 9, 8, 9)	(Peru) Marinera	"Mi Chiclayanita"—Banda de la PNP	Best steps
Magdyel & Daonil	41 (8, 9, 7, 8, 9)	(India) Bollywood	"Jai Ho! (You Are My Destiny)"—A. R. Rahman & The Pussycat Dolls	Safe
Saskia & Pedro	33 (5, 7, 6, 6, 9)	(Brazil) Lambada	"Chorando Se Foi (Lambada)"—Kaoma	Sentenced
Janet & Billy; Saskia & Irving; Mathías & Daniela; Franco & Keyla; Belén y Pedro; María Grazia & Fernando; Melissa & Daonil; Coyote & Claire; Magdyel & Sergio; Pedro Pablo & Pierina	2	Salsa (The danceathon)	"Ya Te Olvide"—Vernis Hernández & Orquesta	

=== Week 7: Disco Night ===
The couples (except those sentenced) danced disco and a team dance of aerodance. In the little train, only the women faced dancing strip dance.

This was the first week in which the "negative vote" was introduced, being used by judge Carlos Cacho.

Running order

Couple	Scores	Dance	Music	Result
Franco & Pierina	31 (8, 8, 7, -1, 9)	Disco	"September"—Earth, Wind & Fire	Safe
María Grazia & Billy	34 (9, 9, 8, 0, 9)	Disco	"Last Dance"—Donna Summer	Safe
Melissa & Sergio	36 (10, 10, 7, 0, 9)	Disco	"Le Freak"—Chic	Safe
Saskia & Pedro	27 (6, 7, 7, -2, 9)	Latin pop*	"Oye el Boom"—David Bisbal	Safe
Mathías & Claire	19 (5, 5, 6, -5, 8)	Mambo*	"Mambo No. 8"—Pérez Prado	—
Mayra & Daonil	28 (7, 7, 7, -2, 9)	Disco	"Never Can Say Goodbye"—Gloria Gaynor	Safe
Pedro Pablo & Keyla	24 (6, 5, 6, -2, 9)	Disco	"You Should Be Dancing"—Bee Gees	Sentenced
Janet & Fernando	23 (7, 4, 6, -2, 8)	Disco	"I Will Survive"—Gloria Gaynor	Sentenced
Brenda & Irving	35 (10, 9, 8, -1, 9)	Disco	"Born to Be Alive"—Patrick Hernandez	Best steps
Mathías & Claire; Mayra & Daonil; María Grazia & Billy; Melissa & Sergio; Pedro Pablo & Keyla	0	Aerodance (Team A)	"Fame"—Irene Cara	
Janet & Fernando; Saskia & Pedro; Franco & Pierina; Brenda & Irving	2	Aerodance (Team B)	"Maniac"—Michael Sembello	

The little train
Participants	Judges' votes	Dance	Music	Winner(s)
Women	Pierina, Pierina, Pierina, Pierina	Strip dance	"Ojos Así"—Shakira	Pierina (2 pts)

=== Week 8: Telenovelas Night ===
The couples (except those sentenced) danced adagio under the rain to famous telenovelas songs. In the versus, only two couples faced dancing reggaeton, the winner would take two extra points plus the couples who gave their support votes.

This was the second and last week in which the "negative vote" was introduced, being used by judge Max Suffrau.

Running order

Couple	Scores	Dance	Music	Telenovela	Result
Saskia & Pedro	26 (5, -2, 6, 8, 9)	Adagio	"Quinceañera"—Timbiriche	Quinceañera	Sentenced
Brenda & Irving	29 (7, -2, 9, 6, 9)	Adagio	"Vivo por Ella"—Andrea Bocelli & Marta Sánchez	Vivo Por Elena	Safe
María Grazia & Billy	33 (9, 0, 9, 7, 9)	Adagio	"Abrázame Muy Fuerte"—Juan Gabriel	Abrázame muy fuerte	Safe
Franco & Pierina	36 (9, 0, 9, 9, 9)	Adagio	"Yo Soy Una Mujer"—Maggie Carles	Isabella, mujer enamorada	Best steps
Pedro Pablo & Keyla	28 (6, 0, 7, 6, 9)	Adagio*	"Sin ti"—Samo		—
Janet & Fernando	27 (6, 0, 7, 7, 7)	Adagio*	"You Can Leave Your Hat On"—Joe Cocker		Sentenced
Melissa & Sergio	34 (8, 0, 9, 8, 9)	Adagio	"La Descarada"—Reyli	Rubí	Safe
Mayra & Daonil	29 (7, -1, 7, 7, 9)	Adagio	"Si Tú Supieras"—Alejandro Fernández	María Isabel	Safe

The versus
Couple (Supports)	Judges' votes	Dance	Music	Result
Melissa & Sergio (Franco)	Melissa, Melissa, Melissa, Melissa	Reggaeton	"Limbo"—Daddy Yankee	Winners (2 pts)
Brenda & Irving (María Grazia, Saskia, Mayra, Pedro Pablo, Janet)	Melissa, Melissa, Melissa, Melissa	Reggaeton	"Limbo"—Daddy Yankee	Losers

=== Week 9: Quarterfinals ===
The couples (except those sentenced) danced strip dance under the rain. In the versus, only two couples faced dancing reggaeton, the winner would take two extra points plus the couples who gave their support votes.

Running order

Couple	Scores	Dance	Music	Result
Brenda & Irving	42 (9, 8, 8, 8, 9)	Strip dance	"I'm a Slave 4 U"—Britney Spears	Best steps
Franco & Pierina	36 (8, 7, 7, 7, 9) (Note: Franco & Pierina had 2 points less for having broken the kiss rule during their routine last week.)	Strip dance	"Womanizer"—Britney Spears	Safe
Mayra & Daonil	44 (9, 9, 8, 9, 9)	Strip dance	"Beautiful Liar"—Beyoncé & Shakira	Best steps
Saskia & Pedro	34 (6, 7, 7, 5, 9)	Cumbia*	"Fuera"—Hermanos Yaipén	—
Janet & Fernando	31 (5, 6, 6, 7, 7)	Cumbia*	"Lárgate"—Hermanos Yaipén	Sentenced
María Grazia & Billy	30 (6, 6, 5, 5, 8)	Strip dance	"Naughty Girl"—Beyoncé	Sentenced
Melissa & Sergio	42 (9, 8, 8, 8, 9)	Strip dance	"SexyBack"—Justin Timberlake	Best steps

The versus
Couple (Supports)	Judges' votes	Dance	Music	Result
Melissa & Sergio (Saskia, Janet, Franco)	Melissa, Melissa, Melissa, Melissa	Reggaeton	"El Ritmo No Perdona (Prende)"—Daddy Yankee	Winners (2 pts)
Brenda & Irving (Mayra, María Grazia)	Melissa, Melissa, Melissa, Melissa	Reggaeton	"El Ritmo No Perdona (Prende)"—Daddy Yankee	Losers
María Grazia & Billy (Brenda)	María Grazia, María Grazia, María Grazia, María Grazia	Reggaeton	"Mayor Que Yo"—Luny Tunes	Winners (2 pts)
Franco & Pierina (Melissa, Mayra, Janet, Saskia)	María Grazia, María Grazia, María Grazia, María Grazia	Reggaeton	"Mayor Que Yo"—Luny Tunes	Losers

=== Week 10: Semifinals ===
The couples performed one dance together with professional champions in different dance styles (except those sentenced) and cha-cha-cha.

Running order

Couple	Scores	Dance	Music	Result
Franco & Pierina	46 (9, 10, 9, 9, 9)	Bachata	"Darte un Beso"—Prince Royce	Best steps
Franco & Pierina	45 (10, 9, 9, 8, 9)	Cha-cha-cha	"Let's Get Loud"—Jennifer Lopez	Best steps
Melissa & Sergio	46 (10, 9, 9, 9, 9)	Strip dance	"I Love Rock 'N Roll"—Britney Spears	Best steps
Melissa & Sergio	45 (10, 10, 8, 8, 9)	Cha-cha-cha	"Moves Like Jagger"—Maroon 5 feat. Christina Aguilera	Best steps
Brenda & Irving	42 (9, 9, 8, 7, 9)	Salsa	"La Malanga"—Eddie Palmieri	Best steps
Brenda & Irving	49 (10, 10, 10, 10, 9)	Cha-cha-cha	"Treasure"—Bruno Mars	Best steps
Janet & Fernando	33 (6, 7, 6, 6, 8)	Festejo*	"El Chacombo"—Arturo "Zambo" Cavero	Sentenced
Janet & Fernando	34 (6, 7, 7, 7, 7)	Cha-cha-cha	"Hot n Cold"—Katy Perry	Sentenced
María Grazia & Billy	39 (9, 7, 7, 7, 9)	Festejo*	"Ritmo, Color y Sabor"—Eva Ayllón	Sentenced
María Grazia & Billy	44 (9, 9, 8, 9, 9)	Cha-cha-cha	"Telephone"—Lady Gaga feat. Beyoncé	Sentenced
Mayra & Daonil	43 (9, 9, 8, 8, 9)	Rumba	"Bésame Mucho"—Thalía & Michael Bublé	Safe
Mayra & Daonil	43 (9, 9, 8, 8, 9)	Cha-cha-cha	"Don't Stop the Music"—Rihanna	Safe

=== Week 11: Finals ===
Individual judges' scores in the charts below (given in parentheses) are listed in this order from left to right: Morella Petrozzi, Max Suffrau, Pachi Valle Riestra, Carlos Cacho.

On the first part, the couples danced freestyle.

On the second part, the final four couples danced quickstep.

Running order (Part 1)

Couple	Scores (Note: In this week, there was no secret vote because the winner was chosen by the votes of the public.)	Dance	Music	Result
María Grazia & Billy	36 (9, 9, 9, 9)	Freestyle*	"Bring Me to Life"—Evanescence feat. Paul McCoy	Safe
Janet & Fernando	30 (7, 8, 7, 8)	Freestyle*	"Bombón Asesino"—Alma Bella / "Rabiosa"—Shakira feat. El Cata	—
Brenda & Irving	40 (10, 10, 10, 10)	Freestyle	"Magalenha"—Sérgio Mendes / "Dança Da Maozinha"—Axé Bahia	Safe
Franco & Pierina	38 (10, 9, 10, 9)	Freestyle	"Condor Pasa" / "Anaconda" / "Mandinga"—Peloteros Jaraneros	Safe
Melissa & Sergio	40 (10, 10, 10, 10)	Freestyle	"Cuba 2012 (DJ Rebel Remix)"—Latin Formation	Safe
Mayra & Daonil	36 (9, 9, 9, 9)	Freestyle	"Vogue"—Rihanna	Eliminated

Running order (Part 2)

Couple	Scores	Dance	Music	Result
Franco & Pierina	36 (9, 9, 9, 9)	Quickstep	"Hey Pachuco"—Royal Crown Revue	Runner-up
Melissa & Sergio	38 (10, 10, 9, 9)	Quickstep	"Sing, Sing, Sing (With a Swing)"—Benny Goodman	Winners
María Grazia & Billy	35 (9, 9, 8, 9)	Quickstep	"Sparkling Diamonds"—Nicole Kidman	Eliminated
Brenda & Irving	39 (10, 10, 9, 10)	Quickstep	"Dancin' Fool"—Barry Manilow	Third place

== Dance chart ==
The celebrities and their dreamers will dance one of these routines for each corresponding week:

- Week 1: Cumbia, disco, hip-hop, merengue or salsa (First Dances)
- Week 2: Cumbia (Cumbia Night)
- Week 3: Salsa (Salsa Night)
- Week 4: Merengue (Merengue Night)
- Week 5: One unlearned dance (The 90's Night)
- Week 6: One unlearned dance & the danceathon (World Dances Night)
- Week 7: Disco, team dances & the little train (Disco Night)
- Week 8: Adagio under the rain & the versus (Telenovelas Night)
- Week 9: Strip dance under the rain & the versus (Quarterfinals)
- Week 10: One unlearned dance & cha-cha-cha (Semifinals)
- Week 11: Freestyle & quickstep (Finals)

Couple	Week 1	Week 2	Week 3	Week 4	Week 5	Week 6	Week 7	Week 8	Week 9	Week 10		Week 11	
Melissa & Sergio	Hip-hop	Cumbia	Salsa	Merengue	Merengue	Belly dance	Disco	Adagio	Strip dance	Strip dance	Cha-cha-cha	Freestyle	Quickstep
Franco & Pierina	Salsa	Cumbia	Salsa	Merengue	Latin pop	K-pop	Disco	Adagio	Strip dance	Bachata	Cha-cha-cha	Freestyle	Quickstep
Brenda & Irving	Salsa	Cumbia	Salsa	Merengue	Latin pop	Tango	Disco	Adagio	Strip dance	Salsa	Cha-cha-cha	Freestyle	Quickstep
María Grazia & Billy	Disco	Cumbia	Salsa	Merengue	Latin pop	Marinera	Disco	Adagio	Strip dance	Festejo	Cha-cha-cha	Freestyle	Quickstep
Mayra & Daonil	Merengue	Cumbia	Salsa	Merengue	Latin pop	Bollywood	Disco	Adagio	Strip dance	Rumba	Cha-cha-cha	Freestyle	
Janet & Fernando	Salsa	Cumbia	Cumbia	Merengue	Tango	Jazz	Disco	Adagio	Cumbia	Festejo	Cha-cha-cha	Freestyle	
Saskia & Pedro	Merengue	Cumbia	Salsa	Jazz	Latin pop	Lambada	Latin pop	Adagio	Cumbia				
Pedro Pablo & Keyla	Merengue	Cumbia	Salsa	Merengue	Merengue	Paso doble	Disco	Adagio					
Mathías & Claire	Hip-hop	Cumbia	Salsa	Hip-hop	Jazz	Jazz	Mambo						
Coyote & Daniela	Cumbia	Cumbia	Salsa	Merengue	Salsa	Festejo							
Carlos & July	Disco	Cumbia	Salsa	Saya									
Sebastián & Katherine	Hip-hop	Cumbia	Disco										

Modalities of competition
Couple	Week 6	Week 7		Week 8	Week 9
Melissa & Sergio	Salsa (Melissa & Daonil)	Aerodance	Strip dance	Reggaeton	Reggaeton
Franco & Pierina	Salsa (Franco & Keyla)	Aerodance	Strip dance	Reggaeton	Reggaeton
Brenda & Irving	Salsa (Belén & Pedro)	Aerodance	Strip dance	Reggaeton	Reggaeton
María Grazia & Billy	Salsa (María Grazia & Fernando)	Aerodance	Strip dance	Reggaeton	Reggaeton
Mayra & Daonil	Salsa (Magdyel & Sergio)	Aerodance	Strip dance	Reggaeton	Reggaeton
Janet & Fernando	Salsa (Janet & Billy)	Aerodance	Strip dance	Reggaeton	Reggaeton
Saskia & Pedro	Salsa (Sakia & Irving)	Aerodance	Strip dance	Reggaeton	Reggaeton
Pedro Pablo & Keyla	Salsa (Pedro Pablo & Pierina)	Aerodance	Strip dance	Reggaeton	
Mathías & Claire	Salsa (Mathías & Daniela)	Aerodance	Strip dance		
Coyote & Daniela	Salsa (Coyote & Claire)				
Carlos & July					
Sebastián & Katherine					

Highest scoring dance
Lowest scoring dance
Gained bonus points for winning this dance
Gained no bonus points for losing this dance
In Italic indicate the dances performed in the duel
