= Carolina Cano =

Peruvian actress and dancer

- Born: July 24, 1985 (age 41); Lima, Peru
- Occupations: Actress, dancer
- Years active: 2005–present

Carolina Cano Frayssinet (Lima, July 24, 1985) is a Peruvian actress

== Biografía ==
Carolina is the daughter of Peruvian actors Carlos Cano de la Fuente and Patricia Frayssinet. She studied Audiovisual Communication.

She debuted on television in the soap opera Besos robados (2004). The following year she made her film debut in Mañana te cuento directed by Eduardo Mendoza, and then Un día sin sexo directed by Frank Pérez-Garland.

Cano starred in the TV series Esta sociedad (by América Televisión, 2006), as Viviana, a young woman from a wealthy family. The second season of the series aired in 2008. She also appeared in the film Mancora.

In 2011 she returned to television as an antagonist of soap opera Ana Cristina (ATV), as Gimena. In theater, Cano acted in the play La chica del Maxim. During the summer season of the following year she hosted the program La costa, and later starred in the play Madrugada.

In early 2013 she starred in the miniseries Guerreros de arena by Frecuencia Latina.

Cano was cast in the series Avenida Peru and had a small role in the film Asu Mare in 2013. Then, she competed in the dance competition show El Gran Show. At year's end, Cano became the champion of the following season El Gran Show 2013: Reyes del Show.

In 2014 she will appear in the film Japy Ending.

== Filmography ==
Films
Year	Title	Role	Notes
2005	Mañana te cuento	Daniela	
2005	Un día sin sexo	Alexa	
2008	Mancora	Mariana	
2013	Asu Mare	Girl on the beach	
2014	Japy Ending	Romina	

Television
Year	Title	Role	Notes
2004	Besos robados	Gisela	
2006	Esta sociedad	Viviana Rodríguez-Ugarteche	Main role
2008	Esta sociedad 2	Viviana Rodríguez-Ugarteche	Main role
2011	Ana Cristina	Gimena Benavides Aragón	Antagonistic role
2012	La costa	Host	
2013	Guerreros de arena	Diana Páez	Main role
2013	Avenida Perú	Monique Aguirre Córdova	
2013	El Gran Show	Contestant	Season 2, 3°
2013	El Gran Show 2013: Reyes del Show	Contestant	Winner

== Theater ==
- Alicia en el país de las maravillas (2006)
- En busca de la bruja perfecta (2008)
- La chica del Maxim (2011) as Clementine - Teatro Peruano Japonés.
- Madrugada (2012) Various roles - Auditorio AFP Integra del Lima Art Museum.
- Una noche con Groucho Marx (2013–14) as Eva Laszlo - CCPUCP.
