= Pochy y su Cocoband =

Dominican merengue group

Pochy y Su Cocoband, also called Cocoband, was a Dominican Republic merengue group in the 1990s. The group was founded in 1989 by "Pochy Familia" born Manuel Alfonso Vásquez Familia (September 17, 1966), and had several number of hit albums with the Kubaney label.

Group members in the early years included Kinito Méndez, Bobby Rafael, Elvis Class, and Silvio Sosa. Each of whom went on to a career of their own.

Hit songs by the group include "La Faldita", “La Flaca” "Chupo Yo, Chupa Tú", "El Hombre Llego Parao", and "Salsa Con Coco". The phrase "¡Pero Con Coco!" (lit. 'But With Coco!') was present in several songs. Sold out Estadio Olímpico Félix Sánchez in Santo Domingo with no co-headliner. Won several Casandra awards throughout his career.

== Discography ==
- Cocoband (1989)
- La Faldita (1990)
- Llegaron los Cocotuces (1991)
- Los Cocotuces... Pero con Coco! (1991)
- El Arrollador (1992)
- ...La Coco Es la Coco (1993)
- El Hombre Llegó Parao (1995)
- Temible (1995)
- El Ombliguito (1996)
- Ponle Sazón! (1998)
- Tú Sabes... No Te Hagas (1999)
- Con Más Sabor a... Coco (2001)
- La Barriguita (2004)
- Coco Reencuentro (2008)
- Coco de Calle (2013)

=== Compilations ===
- Grandes Éxitos de la Cocoband Vol. 1 (1994)
- Grandes Éxitos de la Cocoband Vol. 2 (1994)
- Coco de Oro (2007)
- A Man and His Music: ...¡Pero Con Coco! (2007)

=== Singles ===
- Lotomanía (1988)
- Canciones Cocománticas (1993)
- Navidad con Coco (1998)

=== Remixes ===
- Remixes (1989)
- Coco Mixes (1998)

=== Cassette ===
- Grandes Éxitos de Pochi y Su Cocoband (1997)

=== Live ===
- En México (1996)
- En Vivo (2002)

=== Reedition ===
- Merengue Total! (1991)

The group emerged from the Dominican merengue scene in the late 1980s.
