= El Sonidito =

2008 album by the Hechizeros Band

Studio album by Hechizeros Band
- Released: December 16, 2008
- Recorded: in Nayarit, Mexico
- Genre: Latin

El Sonidito is a 2008 Latin album by the regional Mexican band Hechizeros Band, best known for its title track.

== Composition and production ==
The band, which comes from San Vicente, Nayarit, Mexico, described its genre as a variety of Mexican and Latin rhythms involving keyboards and vocals, inspired by cumbia, quebradita, chicote, and genres including ranchera, banda, duranguense, norteño, corridos, and Latin ballads. They later called their genre "electrocumbia" and "technobanda" and likened their rowdy ("reventón") dance music production to Sinaloan rhythm bands with a synthesizer instead of brass.

The album was released on December 16, 2008. The band's first single was the title track, "El Sonidito," followed by "Sunguirungui" in 2009.

As of mid-2009, the band was preparing for a tour of the United States.

== Reception ==
Professional ratings
Review scores
Source	Rating
AllMusic	3.5/5 stars

The album debuted at #44 on Billboard's Top Latin Albums in early 2009. The album first gained traction on public transport in Mazatlán, Sinaloa. The title track became popular in Mexico and the United States, rising to #33 in Billboard's Hot Latin Songs later in the month, reaching #18 in March 2009. The band received a gold record in July for their sales in the United States.

The album's title song, which Billboard described as a novelty, came at a time when regional Mexican radio was playing more upbeat, wacky regional songs following Los Pikadientes de Caborca's "La Cumbia del Río," as compared to the radio's usual love songs and ballads (corridos). The title track received harsh criticism on the Internet, which the band acknowledged on balance with supporters who appreciated their presentation as straightforward and honest. The title track's inclusion in the 2013 game Grand Theft Auto V further popularized it. It had become the celebration track the Washington Nationals baseball team played after winning games by 2019, the year they won their first World Series.

Artists and bands who covered the title track include Chicano Batman and Bruno Mars. A popular parody video created in 2010 edited clips from the German rock band Rammstein to appear as if playing the title track.

== Track listing ==
No.	Title	Length
1.	"El Sonidito (El Ruidito)"	3:21
2.	"Energía Musical"	3:30
3.	"Sueños Guajiros"	3:18
4.	"Son Indígena"	3:29
5.	"El Escandalito"	4:17
6.	"Sunguirungui"	2:57
7.	"Ordeñando la Vaca"	3:10
8.	"La Máquina del Ritmo"	3:05
9.	"Infidelidad"	3:18
10.	"Te Quiero Tanto"	3:50
