= Kinito Méndez =

Merengue music singer

Kinito Méndez, born José del Carmen Ramírez Méndez on November 18, 1963, is a merengue music singer.

== Biography ==
Mendez started his career in 1988 as one of the co-founders of the merengue band La Cocoband, along with Alfonzo "Pochy Familia" Vásquez and Bobby Rafael. Mendez wrote and arranged many of La Cocoband's songs, including "La Manito", "El Boche", "El Cacu" and "Mujer Malvada". Mendez later decided to leave and start his own project in early 1992 with Bobby Rafael which was "Rokabanda", who won Orquesta Revelación del Año in Los Premios Cassandra in 1993. With Rokabanda, Mendez produced "El Bacano", "El Ñoñito" and "los hombres maduro". In 1995, Mendez released his solo album "El Hombre Merengue", which sold 1.5 million copies.

Mendez was responsible for the 1997 song "El Vuelo 587", which pays tribute to American Airlines Flight 587, an early morning departure flight from New York City to Santo Domingo, Dominican Republic. Mendez partially wrote the lyrics; he and Johnny Ventura were the singer, which were then turned inside one of the songs in "Merenboom, Vol. 2." Méndez himself had been a passenger on the flight before the November 12, 2001, accident flight occurred. The song was later re-released as "The Plane," or "El Avion" in Spanish. Méndez said that originally the song was intended to be about happiness while traveling to the Dominican Republic for the holidays. The aircraft on the flight crashed in 2001. Papi LaFontaine, who once served as Méndez's manager, died in the 2001 accident flight. Méndez said that he was considering writing a new song about the flight, "[b]ut it would be a slower song in tribute to all those who died."

== Discography ==
- El Hombre Merengue (1995)
- El Decreto de Kinito Méndez (1997)
- A Caballo... (1998)
- Su Amigo (1999)
- D'Colores (2000)
- A Palo Limpio (2001)
- Sigo Siendo el Hombre Merengue (2002)
- Celebra Conmigo (2004)
- Con Sabor a Mi (2006)
- La Fábrica (2008)

== Compilations ==
- Los Éxitos de Kinito Méndez (1995)
- Cachamba 96: The Unreleased Versions (1996)
- Sólo Éxitos (1998)
- 20th Anniversary (1999)
- 12 Éxitos (2001)
- 20 Éxitos (2002)
- Éxitos de Kinito Méndez (2005)
- Vida (2009)

== Pa' Ti Pa' Mi Records ==
- El Hombre Merengue (1996)
- Vale la Pena (1998)

== Videography ==
- A Caballo... (1999)
- Ayer y Hoy (2005)
