= Los Melódicos =

Venezuelan band

- Origin: Venezuela
- Genres: música tropical, vallenato, porro
- Years active: 1958–present

Los Melódicos are a Venezuelan band founded in 1958. Los Melódicos play música tropical (literally "tropical music"), a genre developed on the Caribbean coasts of Venezuela, Colombia, and other Central American and Caribbean countries in the mid 20th century.

Los Melódicos are similar in style to fellow Venezuelan group Billo's Caracas Boys, and were formed while Billo Frómeta was occupied by legal problems and unable to make music; Frómeta later wrote some arrangements for the band.

== History ==
Los Melódicos were founded in 1958. Some sources claim that Renato Capriles founded Los Melódicos with the help of Billo Frómeta, others that he became director only in 1962.

Los Melódicos made their performance debut on Radio Caracas Televisión on 15 July 1958. Their debut album Estos son Los Melódicos was recorded the same year. In 1959 Los Melódicos became the first Venezuelan band to tour abroad when they performed in Havana, Cuba.

The original line-up of Los Melódicos included 5 saxophonists, 4 trumpets, and a trombone. Singers for Los Melódicos have included Niro Keller, Emilita Dago, Rafa Pérez, Víctor Piñero, Manolo Monterrey, Rafa Galindo, Lee Palmer, Verónica Rey, Doris Salas, Cherry Navarro, Lucho Navarro, Molly Dick, Daniel Alvarado, Chico Salas, Oscar Santana, Cheo García, Argenis Carruyo, Diveana and Liz. In 2014 El Tiempo reported that Los Melódicos had had 22 female and 43 male singers throughout its history.

By 2008 Los Melódicos had recorded 100 albums, had obtained 9 Golden Congos at the Barranquilla Carnival, and were still playing up to 28 shows a month. Aside from a period spent recovering from a car crash in 1997, Capriles claimed at that time to have been at every Melódicos show in their entire history.

Founder Renato Capriles died in July 2014 of pneumonia.
