= Francisco Bazán =

Peruvian footballer (born 1980)

Personal information
- Full name: Francisco De Paula Bazán Landi
- Date of birth: October 10, 1980 (age 46)
- Place of birth: Lima, Peru
- Height: 1.87 m (6 ft 2 in)
- Position: Goalkeeper

Team information
- Current team: Universitario
- Number: 25

Youth career
- 1992-1995: Academia Cantolao
- Universitario

Senior career*
Years	Team	Apps	(Gls)
1996–1999	Universitario		
1999–2000	Juan Aurich	25	(0)
2001	Deportivo Wanka	21	(0)
2001–2003	Universitario	25	(0)
2004–2005	Pontevedra	21	(0)
2006	Alianza Atletico	13	(0)
2006–2007	Anorthosis	29	(0)
2007	Olympiakos Nicosia	24	(0)
2008	Cienciano	8	(0)
2009–2019	Universitario	4	(0)
- * Club domestic league appearances and goals as of 29 August 2008

Francisco "Paco" de Paula Bazán Landi (born 10 October 1980) is a Peruvian former goalkeeper. He last played for Universitario de Deportes.

== Career ==
He started his career with Peruvian football Club Deportivo San Agustín (San Isidro District). Some of his former clubs are Universitario de Deportes, Olympiakos Nicosia and Anorthosis Famagusta.

== Personal life ==
He is the son of doctor Carlos Bazán Zender, former Minister of Health and Beatriz Landi Bonafé. He studied at the Markham College in the city of Lima.

== Titles ==
Season	Club	Title
Campeonato Descentralizado 1999	Universitario	Primera División Peruana
Campeonato Descentralizado 2009	Universitario	Primera División Peruana
