= Grupo Néctar =

Peruvian cumbia band (1994–2007)

- Genres: Punk rock, Cumbia
- Years active: 1994–2007
- Members: Deyvis Orosco
- Past members: Johnny Orozco; Enrique Orosco; Ricardo Hinostroza; Pascual Rayme; Juan Carlos Marchand; Miguel Porras; Daniel Cahuana; Pedro García
- Website: www.gruponectar.info

Grupo Néctar was a cumbia band that formed in 1994. The band had achieved popularity in Peru and amongst Peruvian diaspora communities worldwide. They died in a traffic accident in May 2007.

== History ==
The band was formed by Johnny Orozco Torres, Ricardo "Papita" Hinostroza, Enrique Orosco, and Juan Carlos Marchand in Argentina.

The band achieved its peak of popularity in the year 2000 with their song El Arbolito, which was a hit in Peru for weeks on the top charts.

On the daybreak of May 13, 2007, the band was going on tour and was scheduled to perform at a club in Buenos Aires. Most members of the band, along with other people, were being transported in a bus when the bus was in an accident. Thirteen people died in the crash, including all the founding members of the Grupo Néctar.

The death of these members deeply impacted the Peruvian community. Communities in both Peru and Argentina mourned the death of the founding members.

The son of Johnny Orozco, Deyvis, continues to perform under the name of the "new" Grupo Néctar.

== Songs ==
The most popular songs of the group include own hits and covers from other bands:

- El arbolito (cover of Los Destellos of Peru - 1968)
- Pecadora
- Ojitos hechiceros
- El baile de la Cumbia
- La última noche
- La florcita
- Mi enamorada
- Tú vives equivocada (cover of Grupo Cañaveral of Mexico - original title "Echarme al olvido" - 1995)
- El penal
- Ojitos mentirosos
