= El Gran Show season 2 =

El Gran Show
- Season 2
- Promotional poster
- Hosted by: Gisela Valcárcel; Aldo Díaz; Cristian Rivero
- Judges: Morella Petrozzi; Carlos Alcántara; Pachi Valle Riestra; Stuart Bishop
- Celebrity winner: Belén Estévez
- Professional winner: Gian Frank Navarro
- No. of episodes: 12

Release
- Original network: América Televisión
- Original release: August 14 – October 30, 2010

Season chronology
- ← Previous; Season 1 Next → Season 3

Season two of El Gran Show premiered on August 14, 2010, on the América Televisión network.

On October 30, 2010, Belén Estévez and Gian Frank Navarro were crowned champions, representing the city of Lima and whose dream was to treat Gian Frank's 4-year-old nephew who suffers from viral encephalitis, a disease that has him prostrate with scoliosis, blindness and seizures. Karen Dejo and Edward Mávila finished second, while Miguel "Conejo" Rebosio and Fabianne Hayashida finished third.

== Cast ==
=== Couples ===
The celebrities were introduced during the final of the previous season. In the first week were presented to the dreamers and the dreams of each one of them.

Before the start of the program, Fiorella Avilés (Fernando Roca Rey's dreamer) retired from the show for health reasons, instead danced Katherine Mendoza (dreamer on El show de los sueños), finally Whitney Misme became an official dreamer from the second week.

During the show, two heroines left the program. The first was Melissa Garcia, who suffered an injury in the column, and was replaced by the model Danuska Zapata. The second was Jimena Lindo, who suffered a muscle tear in the leg, so actress Melania Urbina came into place from the fifth week, however, Urbina also leaves the competition for strict medical rest due to a typhoid fever, finally former contestant Karen Dejo came into place from the seventh week.

Celebrity	Notability (known for)	Dreamer	Status
Jaime Cuadra	Singer & record producer	Carol Unda	Eliminated 1st on August 28, 2010
Melissa García	Model	Brian Valdizán	Eliminated 2nd on September 4, 2010
Carlos Solano	Al Fondo Hay Sitio actor	Fabiola Moreau	Eliminated 3rd on September 11, 2010
Adolfo Aguilar	TV host & actor	Lleruza Sinti	Eliminated 4th on September 18, 2010
Rebeca Escribens	Actress & TV host	Moisés Arévalo	Eliminated 5th on September 26, 2010
Angie Jibaja	Model	Rubén Amaya	Eliminated 6th on October 2, 2010
Mauricio Fernandini	TV host & journalist	Akemi Giura	Eliminated 7th on October 9, 2010
Fernando Roca Rey	Bullfighter	Whitney Misme; Katherine Mendoza (week 1)	Eliminated 8th on September 16, 2010
Stephanie Orué	Actress	Licky Barreto	Eliminated 9th on September 23, 2010
Miguel "Conejo" Rebosio	Former football player	Fabianne Hayashida	Third place on September 30, 2010
Karen Dejo	Actress & TV host	Edward Mávila	Runner-up on September 30, 2010
Belén Estévez	Former vedette	Gian Frank Navarro	Winners on September 30, 2010

=== Hosts and judges ===
Gisela Valcárcel, Aldo Díaz and Cristian Rivero returned as hosts, while Morella Petrozzi, Carlos Alcántara, Pachi Valle Riestra and the VIP Jury returned as judges. Stuart Bishop, English choreographer who was a replacement judge last season, entered the show as a new judge since week 7.

== Scoring charts ==
Couple	Place	1	2	3	4	5	6	7	8	9	10	11	12	
Couple	Place	1	2	3	4	5	6	7	8	9	10	11	Top 3	Top 2
Belén & Gian Frank	1	37	32	37	37	38	41	43	52	92	71	91	92	95
Karen & Edward	2	32	31	32	29	36	34	42	40	88	67	92	39	90
Conejo & Fabianne	3	27	32	35	32	37	36	41	46	75	73	84	85	
Stephanie & Licky	4	31	35	33	31	35	34	42	40	91	68	85		
Fernando & Whitney	5	28	29	37	34	36	42	40	43	88	69			
Mauricio & Akemi	6	31	34	34	41	35	31	40	40	81				
Angie & Rubén	7	28	30	33	32	32	34	36	45					
Rebeca & Moisés	8	32	34	31	34	32	31	44						
Adolfo & Lleruza	9	28	30	33	32	31	32							
Carlos & Fabiola	10	28	28	29	30	30								
Melissa & Brian	11	29	29	27	32									
Jaime & Carol	12	29	29	31										

Red numbers indicate the sentenced for each week
Green numbers indicate the best steps for each week
the couple was eliminated that week
the couple was safe in the duel
the winning couple
the runner-up couple
the third-place couple

=== Average score chart ===
This table only counts dances scored on a 40-point scale. (Note: Because Stuart Bishop entered the show as a new judge, the VIP Jury scores from weeks 7, 8, 9, 11 and 12 were excluded.)

Rank by average	Place	Couple	Total points	Number of dances	Average
1	1	Belén & Gian Frank	656	18	36.4
2	4	Stephanie & Licky	470	14	33.6
3	5	Fernando & Whitney	397	12	33.1
4	2	Karen & Edward	562	17	33.0
5	6	Mauricio & Akemi	329	10	32.9
6	3	Conejo & Fabianne	522	16	32.6
7	8	Rebeca & Moisés	226	7	32.3
8	9	Adolfo & Lleruza	186	6	31.0
9	7	Angie & Rubén	245	8	30.6
10	11	Melissa & Brian	117	4	29.3
11	10	Carlos & Fabiola	145	5	29.0
11	12	Jaime & Carol	87	3	29.0

=== Highest and lowest scoring performances ===
The best and worst performances in each dance according to the judges' 40-point scale are as follows:

Dance	Highest scored dancer(s)	Highest score	Lowest scored dancer(s)	Lowest score
Latin pop	Belén Estévez	37	Miguel "Conejo" Rebosio	27
Cumbia	Stephanie Orué	35	Jaime Cuadra	27
Disco	Belén Estévez; Fernando Roca Rey	37	Melissa García	27
World dances	Mauricio Fernandini	40	Jimena Lindo; Angie Jibaja	29
Merengue	Belén Estévez	37	Angie Jibaja	30
Jazz	Belén Estévez	40	Carlos Solano	30
Pop	Belén Estévez	39	Rebeca Escribens; Mauricio Fernandini	31
Axé	Adolfo Aguilar	32	Angie Jibaja	31
Hip-hop	Stephanie Orué	34	Angie Jibaja	29
Salsa	Belén Estévez	40	Stephanie Orué	29
Tex-mex	Stephanie Orué	39	Miguel "Conejo" Rebosio	28
Pachanga	Stephanie Orué	37	Mauricio Fernandini	32
Strip dance	Belén Estévez	38	Miguel "Conejo" Rebosio	30
Rock and roll	Miguel "Conejo" Rebosio	38	Karen Dejo	32
Tango	Belén Estévez	38	Miguel "Conejo" Rebosio	33
Festejo	Belén Estévez	36	Karen Dejo	31
Mix	Belén Estévez	38	Miguel "Conejo" Rebosio	34
Quickstep	Belén Estévez	37	Karen Dejo	34

=== Couples' highest and lowest scoring dances ===
Scores are based upon a potential 40-point maximum.

Couples	Highest scoring dance(s)	Lowest scoring dance(s)
Belén & Gian Frank	Salsa & Jazz (40)	Cumbia & Hip-hop (32)
Karen & Edward	Salsa (38)	Tarantella (29)
Conejo & Fabianne	Rock and roll (38)	Latin pop (27)
Stephanie & Licky	Tex-mex (39)	Salsa (29)
Fernando & Whitney	Pop (38)	Latin pop (28)
Mauricio & Akemi	Marinera (40)	Latin pop, Pop, Hip-hop & Strip dance (31)
Angie & Rubén	Salsa (37)	Latin pop (28)
Rebeca & Moisés	Disco (34)	Disco & Pop (31)
Adolfo & Lleruza	Disco (33)	Latin pop (28)
Carlos & Fabiola	Bollywood & Jazz (30)	Latin pop & Cumbia (28)
Melissa & Brian	Belly dance (32)	Disco (27)
Jaime & Carol	Latin pop (31)	Cumbia (27)

== Weekly scores ==
Individual judges' scores in the charts below (given in parentheses) are listed in this order from left to right: Morella Petrozzi, Carlos Alcántara, Pachi Valle Riestra, VIP Jury.

=== Week 1:Latin Pop ===
The couples danced latin pop. No couple was sentenced in this week.

Running order

Couple	Scores	Dance	Music	Result
Angie & Ruben	28 (6, 7, 8, 7)	Latin pop	"Candela"—Noelia	Safe
Mauricio & Akemi	31 (7, 8, 8, 8)	Latin pop	"Cielo Sin Luz"—Anna Carina	Safe
Rebeca & Moiséa	32 (8, 8, 8, 8)	Latin pop	"Ten Paciencia"—Thalía	Safe
Adolfo & Lleruza	28 (6, 7, 7, 8)	Latin pop	"Oye El Boom"—David Bisbal	Safe
Melissa & Brian	29 (7, 8, 7, 8)	Latin pop	"Mujer Latina"—Thalía	Safe
Fernando & Katherine	28 (7, 7, 7, 7)	Latin pop	"Torero"—Chayanne	Safe
Stephanie & Licky	31 (7, 8, 8, 8)	Latin pop	"Loba"—Shakira	Safe
Conejo & Fabianne	27 (6, 7, 7, 7)	Latin pop	"Bulería"—David Bisbal	Safe
Belén & Gian Frank	37 (9, 9, 10, 9)	Latin pop	"Tu Veneno"—Natalia Oreiro	Best steps
Jimena & Edward	32 (8, 8, 8, 8)	Latin pop	"Baila, Baila"—Chayanne	Safe
Carlos & Fabiola	28 (7, 7, 7, 7)	Latin pop	"Dame Más"—Ricky Martin	Safe
Jaime & Carol	29 (7, 7, 7, 8)	Latin pop	"Pégate"—Ricky Martin	Safe

=== Week 2: Cumbia ===
The couples danced cumbia and a danceathon of salsa.

Running order

Couple	Scores	Dance	Music	Result
Carlos & Fabiola	28 (7, 7, 6, 7)	Cumbia	"La Amante"—Grupo 5	Sentenced
Jimena & Edward	31 (9, 7, 7, 8)	Cumbia	"La Escobita"—Marisol y La Magia del Norte	Safe
Conejo & Fabianne	32 (8, 8, 8, 8)	Cumbia	"Dos Locos"—Los Villacorta	Safe
Angie & Ruben	30 (8, 8, 7, 7)	Cumbia	"Por Un Minuto de tu Amor"—Grupo 5	Safe
Fernando & Whitney	29 (8, 7, 7, 7)	Cumbia	"Amor de Mis Amores"—Marisol y la Magia del Norte	Saved
Stephanie & Licky	35 (9, 9, 8, 9)	Cumbia	"Sacude el Billete"—Dilbert Aguilar y La Tribu	Best steps
Jaime & Carol	27 (7, 6, 7, 7)	Cumbia	"Vete Nomas"—Maricarmen Marín	Sentenced
Belén & Gian Frank	32 (9, 6, 8, 9)	Cumbia	"La Ricotona"—Armonía 10	Safe
Melissa & Brian	29 (7, 7, 7, 8)	Cumbia	"Canalla"—Marisol y La Magia del Norte	Saved
Rebeca & Moisés	32 (8, 8, 8, 8)	Cumbia	"Tu Hipocresía"—Grupo 5 feat. John Kelvin	Safe
Adolfo & Lleruza	30 (8, 7, 7, 8)	Cumbia	"El Gusano"—Orquesta Papilón	Safe
Mauricio & Akemi	34 (9, 8, 8, 9)	Cumbia	"Amor Pirata"—Los Villacorta	Safe
Adolfo & Llerusa; Jaime & Carol; Rebeca & Moisés; Belén & Gian Frank; Mauricio & Akemi; Melissa & Brian; Angie & Rubén; Jimena & Edward; Stephanie & Licky; Conejo & Fabianne; Fernando & Whitney; Carlos & Fabiola	2	Salsa (The danceathon)	"Aguanile"—Marc Anthony	

- Public's favorite couple: Jaime & Carol (2 pts).

=== Week 3: Disco ===
The couples (except those sentenced) danced disco.

Running order

Couple	Scores	Dance	Music	Result
Rebeca & Moisés	31 (8, 8, 8, 7)	Disco	"Dancing Queen"—ABBA	Safe
Adolfo & Llerusa	33 (8, 8, 8, 9)	Disco	"Boogie Wonderland"—Earth, Wind & Fire	Safe
Jimena & Edward	32 (8, 8, 8, 8)	Disco	"Don't Stop 'til You Get Enough"—Michael Jackson	Safe
Conejo & Fabianne	35 (9, 9, 8, 9)	Disco	"Y.M.C.A."—Village People	Safe
Stephanie & Licky	33 (8, 9, 7, 9)	Disco	"On the Radio"—Donna Summer	Safe
Belén & Gian Frank	37 (10, 10, 8, 9)	Disco	"Stayin' Alive"—Bee Gees	Best steps
Carlos & Fabiola	29 (7, 8, 6, 8)	Latin pop*	"Claridad"—Menudo	Sentenced
Jaime & Carol	31 (8, 8, 7, 8)	Latin pop*	"Súbete a mi Moto"—Menudo	—
Melissa & Brian	27 (7, 7, 7, 6)	Disco	"Hush Hush; Hush Hush"—The Pussycat Dolls	Sentenced
Fernando & Whitney	37 (10, 9, 8, 10)	Disco	"Knock on Wood"—Amii Stewart	Best steps
Mauricio & Akemi	34 (9, 9, 7, 9)	Disco	"I Will Survive"—Gloria Gaynor	Safe
Angie & Rubén	31 (8, 8, 7, 8)	Disco	"No More Tears (Enough is Enough)"—Donna Summer feat. Barbra Streisand	Safe

- Public's favorite couple: Angie & Rubén (2 pts).

*The duel

- Carlos & Fabiola: Safe
- Jaime & Carol: Eliminated

=== Week 4: World Dances ===
The couples performed the world dances and a danceathon of cumbia.

Due to an injury, Melissa García was unable to perform, so Brian Valdizán danced with Danuska Zapata instead.

Running order

Couple	Scores	Dance	Music	Result
Stephanie & Licky	30 (8, 7, 7, 8)	(United States) Country	"Old Pop in an Oak"—Rednex	Safe
Conejo & Fabianne	32 (9, 7, 8, 8)	(Cuba) Salsa	"Abre Que Voy"—Los Van Van	Safe
Belén & Gian Frank	36 (9, 9, 9, 9)	(Brazil) Samba	"Hip Hip Chin Chin"—Club des Belugas / "Magalenha"—Sérgio Mendes	Safe
Jimena & Edward	29 (6, 8, 7, 8)	(Italy) Tarantella	"Tarantella"—Fred Rovella	Sentenced
Angie & Rubén	29 (7, 7, 7, 8)	(France) Can-can	"Galop Infernal"—Vanessa Mae	Safe
Carlos & Fabiola	30 (7, 8, 7, 8)	(India) Bollywood*	"Jai Ho"—A. R. Rahman	Sentenced
Danuska & Brian	32 (8, 8, 8, 8)	(Saudi Arabia) Belly dance*	"Sidi Mansour"—Saber Rebaï	—
Rebeca & Moisés	34 (8, 9, 8, 9)	(Spain) Rumba flamenca	"Bamboléo" / "Djobi Djoba" / "Baila Me"—Gipsy Kings	Safe
Mauricio & Akemi	40 (10, 10, 10, 10)	(Peru) Marinera	"La Veguera"—Fiesta Criolla	Best steps
Fernando & Whitney	34 (9, 8, 8, 9)	(Spain) Paso doble	"España cañí"—Pascual Marquina Narro	Safe
Adolfo & Llerusa	32 (7, 8, 8, 9)	(Argentina) Tango	"Tanguera"—Sexteto Mayor	Safe
Adolfo & Llerusa; Rebeca & Moisés; Belén & Gian Frank; Mauricio & Akemi; Danuska & Brian; Angie & Rubén; Jimena & Edward; Stephanie & Licky; Conejo & Fabianne; Fernando & Whitney; Carlos & Fabiola	1; 1 1	Cumbia (The danceathon)	"Viento" / "Muchacho provinciano"—Toño Centella	

- Public's favorite couple: Angie & Rubén (2 pts).

*The duel

- Carlos & Fabiola: Safe
- Danuska & Brian: Eliminated

=== Week 5: Merengue ===
The couples (except those sentenced) danced merengue, a team dance of hula and a danceathon of salsa.

Due to an injury, Jimena Lindo withdrew from the competition, so Melania Urbina replaced her as of this week.

Running order

Couple	Scores	Dance	Music	Result
Angie & Rubén	30 (7, 8, 7, 8)	Merengue	"La Faldita"—La Coco Band	Sentenced
Belén & Gian Frank	36 (9, 9, 9, 9)	Merengue	"La Viagra"—Oro Solido	Best steps
Conejo & Fabianne	35 (8, 9, 9, 9)	Merengue	"El Kikikí"—Rikanera	Safe
Adolfo & Llerusa	31 (7, 8, 8, 8)	Merengue	"La Reina de la Pista"—Oro Sólido	Sentenced
Carlos & Fabiola	30 (7, 8, 7, 8)	Jazz*	"Lady Marmalade"—Christina Aguilera, Lil' Kim, Mýa y Pink	—
Melania & Edward	34 (8, 9, 9, 8)	Jazz*	"Sparkling Diamonds"—Nicole Kidman	Safe
Rebeca & Moisés	32 (8, 8, 8, 8)	Merengue	"El Avión"—El Cheque	Safe
Fernando & Whitney	34 (9, 8, 8, 9)	Merengue	"Una Nalgadita"—Oro Sólido	Safe
Mauricio & Akemi	33 (8, 8, 8, 9)	Merengue	"Moviendo las Caderas"—Oro Sólido	Safe
Stephanie & Licky	33 (8, 9, 8, 8)	Merengue	"Coqueta y Sabrosa"—Zafra Negra	Safe
Belén & Gian Frank; Angie & Rubén; Conejo & Fabianne; Fernando & Whitney; Melania & Edward	2	Hula (Team A)	"Mash It Up"—Burning Flames	
Adolfo & Llerusa; Rebeca & Moisés; Mauricio & Akemi; Stephanie & Licky; Carlos & Fabiola	0	Hula (Team B)	"I Command You"—Burning Flames	
Adolfo & Llerusa; Rebeca & Moisés; Belén & Gian Frank; Mauricio & Akemi; Angie & Rubén; Jimena & Edward; Stephanie & Licky; Conejo & Fabianne; Fernando & Whitney; Carlos & Fabiola	2	Salsa (The danceathon)	"Aguanile"—Pacho Hurtado	

- Public's favorite couple: Mauricio & Akemi (2 pts).

*The duel

- Carlos & Fabiola: Eliminated
- Melania & Edward: Safe

=== Week 6: The Pop Divas ===
The couples (except those sentenced) danced pop, a team dance of jazz and a danceathon of salsa.

Orden de aparición

Pareja	Puntajes	Baile	Música	Resultado
Stephanie & Licky	34 (9, 9, 8, 8)	Pop	"Womanizer"—Britney Spears	Safe
Conejo & Fabianne	33 (9, 8, 8, 8)	Pop	"Bootylicious"—Destiny's Child	Safe
Belen & Gian Frank	39 (10, 10, 10, 9)	Pop	"Play"—Jennifer Lopez	Safe
Melania & Edward	33 (8, 9, 8, 8)	Pop	"Poker Face"—Lady Gaga	Safe
Angie & Ruben	31 (8, 8, 7, 8)	Axé*	"Maomeno / Mueve La Pompa / Danza Da Vampiro"—Axé Bahia	Safe
Adolfo & Lleruza	32 (8, 8, 8, 8)	Axé*	"Yo Quiero Bailar / Danza Da Maozinha / Oda Odes"—Axe Bahia	—
Rebeca & Moises	31 (8, 8, 7, 8)	Pop	"Don't Tell Me"—Madonna	Sentenced
Fernando & Whitney	38 (9, 10, 9, 10)	Pop	"Did It Again"—Shakira	Best steps
Mauricio & Akemi	31 (8, 7, 8, 8)	Pop	"Whine Up"—Kat DeLuna	Sentenced
Adolfo & Llerusa; Mauricio & Akemi; Melania & Edward; Rebeca & Moisés; Stephanie & Licky	0	Jazz (Team A)	"Ilarie"—Xuxa	
Angie & Rubén; Belén & Gian Frank; Fernando & Whitney; Conejo & Fabianne	2	Jazz (Team B)	"Todo el Mundo Está Feliz"—Xuxa	
Adolfo & Llerusa; Rebeca & Moisés; Belén & Gian Frank; Mauricio & Akemi; Angie & Rubén; Melania & Edward; Stephanie & Licky; Conejo & Fabianne; Fernando & Whitney	1; 1 1	Salsa (The danceathon)	"Arrepentida"—Los Adolescent's	

- Public's favorite couple: Fernando & Whitney (2 pts).

*The duel

- Angie & Ruben: Safe
- Adolfo & Lleruza: Eliminated

=== Week 7: Hip-Hop ===
Individual judges' scores in the charts below (given in parentheses) are listed in this order from left to right: Morella Petrozzi, Stuart Bishop, Carlos Alcántara, Pachi Valle Riestra, VIP Jury.

The couples danced hip-hop (except those sentenced) and a danceathon of cha-cha-cha. In the versus, the couples faced dancing guaracha.

Due to an injury, Melania Urbina withdrew from the competition, so Karen Dejo replaced her as of this week.

Running order

Couple	Scores	Dance	Music	Result
Belén & Gian Frank	41 (10, 6, 8, 8, 9)	Hip-hop	"Who's Your Daddy?"—Daddy Yankee	Best steps
Conejo & Fabianne	40 (10, 7, 8, 7, 8)	Hip-hop	"I Know You Want Me (Calle Ocho)"—Pitbull	Safe
Mauricio & Akemi	38 (8, 8, 8, 7, 7)	Disco*	"Stayin' Alive"—Bee Gees	Safe
Rebeca & Moisés	43 (8, 7, 10, 9, 9)	Disco*	"You Should Be Dancing"—Bee Gees	—
Stephanie & Licky	42 (8, 9, 9, 8, 8)	Hip-hop	"Se Menea"—Wisin & Yandel	Safe
Karen & Edward	40 (10, 7, 8, 7, 8)	Hip-hop	"Ella Se Arrebata"—Latin Fresh	Safe
Fernando & Whitney	38 (9, 6, 8, 7, 8)	Hip-hop	"Low"—Flo Rida feat. T-Pain	Sentenced
Angie & Rubén	36 (8, 6, 8, 7, 7)	Hip-hop	"Impacto"—Daddy Yankee feat. Fergie	Sentenced
Karen & Edward; Rebeca & Moisés; Belén & Gian Frank; Mauricio & Akemi; Angie & Rubén; Stephanie & Licky; Conejo & Fabianne; Fernando & Whitney	1; 1; 1; 1	Cha-cha-cha (The danceathon)	"¿Quién Será?"—Jaime Cuadra y la "Jazz House"	

The versus
Couple	Judges' votes	Dance	Music	Result
Karen & Edward	Karen, Karen, Rebeca, Karen	Guaracha	"Sopita en Botella"—Carolina la O	Winners (1 pto)
Rebeca & Moisés	Karen, Karen, Rebeca, Karen	Guaracha	"Juancito Trucupey"—Carolina la O	Losers
Mauricio & Akemi	Angie, Mauricio, Mauricio, Mauricio	Guaracha	"Melao de Caña"—Carolina la O	Winners (1 pto)
Angie & Rubén	Angie, Mauricio, Mauricio, Mauricio	Guaracha	"Caramelo a Kilo"—Carolina la O	Losers
Belén & Gian Frank	Belén, Belén, Belén, Belén	Guaracha	"Burundanga"—Carolina la O	Winners (1 pto)
Fernando & Whitney	Belén, Belén, Belén, Belén	Guaracha	"Yo Soy la Rumba"—Carolina la O	Losers
Conejo & Fabianne	Conejo, Conejo, Stephanie, Conejo	Guaracha	"Pollera Colorá"—Carolina la O	Winners (1 pto)
Stephanie & Licky	Conejo, Conejo, Stephanie, Conejo	Guaracha	"El Yerberito Moderno"—Carolina la O	Losers

- Public's favorite couple: Fernando & Whitney (2 pts).

*The duel

- Mauricio & Akemi: Safe
- Rebeca & Moisés: Eliminated

=== Week 8: Trio Salsa ===
The couples danced trio salsa involving another celebrity, and a danceathon of cumbia. In the versus, the couples faced dancing strip dance.

Running order

Couple (Trio Dance Partner)	Scores	Dance	Music	Result
Stephanie & Licky (Jonathan Rojas)	40 (8, 8, 8, 8, 8)	Salsa	"Rumbera"—Joe Arroyo	Safe
Karen & Edward (Omar García)	38 (8, 7, 9, 7, 7)	Salsa	"La Salsa Vive"—Tito Nieves	Sentenced
Belen & Gian Frank (Christian Domínguez)	50 (10, 10, 10, 10, 10)	Salsa	"Que Se Sepa"—Roberto Roena	Best steps
Conejo & Fabianne (Delly Madrid)	42 (8, 9, 9, 7, 9)	Salsa	"Quimbara"—Celia Cruz	Safe
Mauricio & Akemi (Jhoany Vegas)	40 (8, 8, 8, 8, 8)	Salsa	"La Rebelión"—Joe Arroyo	Sentenced
Angie & Ruben (Jean Paul Santa María)	45 (10, 9, 9, 9, 8)	Salsa*	"Temba, Tumba, Timba"—Los Van Van	—
Fernando & Whitney (Fernando Armas)	41 (8, 8, 8, 8, 9)	Salsa*	"Deja la Mala Noche"—Adalberto Álvarez y su Son	Safe
Karen & Edward; Belén & Gian Frank; Mauricio & Akemi; Angie & Rubén; Stephanie & Licky; Conejo & Fabianne; Fernando & Whitney	2	Cumbia (The danceathon)	"El Aguajal"—Los Shapis	

The versus
Couple	Judges' votes	Dance	Music	Result
Belén & Gian Frank	Belén, Belén, Belén, Belén	Strip dance	"Beep"—The Pussycat Dolls feat. will.i.am	Winners (2 ptos)
Karen & Edward	Belén, Belén, Belén, Belén	Strip dance	"Beautiful Liar"—Beyoncé feat. Shakira	Losers
Fernando & Whitney	Fernando, Fernando, Fernando, Angie	Strip dance	"3"—Britney Spears	Winners (2 ptos)
Angie & Rubén	Fernando, Fernando, Fernando, Angie	Strip dance	"Don't Cha"—The Pussycat Dolls feat. Busta Rhymes	Losers
Conejo & Fabianne	Conejo, Stephanie, Mauricio, Conejo	Strip dance	"Lose My Breath"—Destiny's Child	Winners (2 ptos)
Mauricio & Akemi	Conejo, Stephanie, Mauricio, Conejo	Strip dance	"Buttons"—The Pussycat Dolls feat. Snoop Dogg	Losers
Stephanie & Licky	Conejo, Stephanie, Mauricio, Conejo	Strip dance	"Gimme More"—Britney Spears	Losers

- Public's favorite couple: Conejo & Fabianne (2 pts).

*The duel

- Angie & Ruben: Eliminated
- Fernando & Whitney: Safe

=== Week 9: Trio Tex-Mex/Strip Dance ===
The couples danced trio tex-mex involving a member of the troupe (except those sentenced), strip dance and a danceathon of cumbia.

Running order

Couple (Trio Dance Partner)	Scores	Dance	Music	Result
Conejo & Fabianne (Kervin Valdizán)	36 (7, 6, 7, 8, 8)	Tex-mex	"Baila Esta Cumbia"—Selena	Sentenced
Conejo & Fabianne (Kervin Valdizán)	39 (7, 7, 8, 8, 9)	Strip dance	"I Love Rock 'N Roll"—Joan Jett & the Blackhearts	Sentenced
Stephanie & Licky (Christian Navarro)	48 (10, 9, 10, 10, 9)	Tex-mex	"Techno Cumbia"—Selena	Safe
Stephanie & Licky (Christian Navarro)	43 (8, 10, 9, 8, 8)	Strip dance	"What's Love Got to Do with It"—Tina Turner	Safe
Karen & Edward	43 (9, 8, 9, 8, 9)	Pachanga*	"La Primavera"—The Sacados	Safe
Karen & Edward	43 (8, 8, 9, 8, 10)	Strip dance	"Crazy"—Aerosmith	Safe
Mauricio & Akemi	41 (8, 8, 8, 8, 9)	Pachanga*	"Ritmo de la Noche"—The Sacados	—
Mauricio & Akemi	40 (8, 7, 8, 8, 9)	Strip dance	"Sweet Dreams (Are Made of This)"—Eurythmics	—
Fernando & Whitney (Carlos Suárez)	44 (10, 8, 8, 9, 9)	Tex-mex	"No tengo dinero"—Kumbia Kings feat. Juan Gabriel y El Gran Silencio	Sentenced
Fernando & Whitney (Carlos Suárez)	42 (9, 8, 8, 8, 9)	Strip dance	"You Give Love a Bad Name"—Bon Jovi	Sentenced
Belén & Gian Frank (Johnny Botero)	44 (9, 8, 9, 9, 9)	Tex-mex	"El Chico del Apartamento 512"—Selena	Best steps
Belén & Gian Frank (Johnny Botero)	48 (10, 10, 9, 9, 10)	Strip dance	"Walk Away" / "Fighter"—Christina Aguilera	Best steps
Karen & Edward; Belén & Gian Frank; Mauricio & Akemi; Stephanie & Licky; Conejo & Fabianne; Fernando & Whitney	2	Cumbia (The danceathon)	"La Amante" / "Quédate Con Él" / "Morir de Amor"—Grupo 5	

- Public's favorite couple: Fernando & Whitney (2 pts).

*The duel

- Karen & Edward: Safe
- Mauricio & Akemi: Eliminated

=== Week 10: Quarterfinals ===
Individual judges' scores in the chart below (given in parentheses) are listed in this order from left to right: Morella Petrozzi, Stuart Bishop, Pachi Valle Riestra, VIP Jury.

The couples danced rock and roll, merengue (except those sentenced) and a danceathon of cumbia.

Running order

Couple	Scores	Dance	Music	Result
Karen & Edward	32 (8, 8, 8, 8)	Rock and roll	"Jailhouse Rock"—Elvis Presley	Sentenced
Karen & Edward	33 (9, 8, 8, 8)	Merengue	"El Santo Cachón"—Las Chicas del Can "El Baile del Mono"—Wilfrido Vargas	Sentenced
Stephanie & Licky	34 (10, 8, 8, 8)	Rock and roll	"At the Hop"—Artie Singer	Sentenced
Stephanie & Licky	34 (8, 9, 9, 8)	Merengue	"El Negro No Puede"—Las Chicas del Can "El Baile del Perrito"—Wilfrido Vargas	Sentenced
Belén & Gian Frank	34 (9, 8, 9, 8)	Rock and roll	"Rock Around the Clock"—James E. Myers	Safe
Belén & Gian Frank	37 (10, 8, 9, 10)	Merengue	"Juana la Cubana"—Las Chicas del Can "Abusadora"—Wilfrido Vargas	Safe
Conejo & Fabianne	38 (10, 10, 9, 9)	Rock and roll	"Long Tall Sally"—Robert Blackwell	Best steps
Conejo & Fabianne	35 (10, 9, 8, 8)	Pachanga*	"Adicto al Rock and Roll"—El Tri	Best steps
Fernando & Whitney	34 (9, 9, 8, 8)	Rock and roll	"Tutti Frutti"—Little Richard	—
Fernando & Whitney	33 (8, 8, 8, 9)	Pachanga*	"Jet Set"—Soda Stereo	—
Karen & Edward; Belén & Gian Frank; Mauricio & Akemi; Stephanie & Licky; Conejo & Fabianne; Fernando & Whitney	2	Cumbia (The danceathon)	"La Pituca"—Tongo	

- Public's favorite couple: Fernando & Whitney (2 pts).

*The duel

- Conejo & Fabianne: Safe
- Fernando & Whitney: Eliminated

=== Week 11: Semifinals ===
Individual judges' scores in the charts below (given in parentheses) are listed in this order from left to right: Morella Petrozzi, Stuart Bishop, Carlos Alcántara, Pachi Valle Riestra, VIP Jury.

The couples danced salsa and tango (except those sentenced). In the versus, the couples faced dancing cumbia.

Running order

Couple	Scores	Dance	Music	Result
Conejo & Fabianne	40 (9, 8, 8, 7, 8)	Salsa	"Aguanile"—Héctor Lavoe	Sentenced
Conejo & Fabianne	42 (8, 8, 9, 8, 9)	Tango	"Santa María (Del Buen Ayre)"—Gotan Project	Sentenced
Stephanie & Licky	37 (7, 7, 8, 7, 8)	Salsa	"Todo Poderoso"—Héctor Lavoe	—
Stephanie & Licky	46 (10, 9, 9, 9, 9)	Pachanga*	"Fiesta—Joan Manuel Serrat	—
Karen & Edward	46 (10, 9, 9, 9, 9)	Salsa	"Acuyuyé"—DLG	Best steps
Karen & Edward	45 (10, 8, 9, 9, 9)	Pachanga*	"Sopa de Caracol"—Banda Blanca	Best steps
Belén & Gian Frank	42 (10, 8, 8, 8, 8)	Salsa	"I Love Salsa!"—N'Klabe	Sentenced
Belén & Gian Frank	48 (10, 8, 10, 10, 10)	Tango	"Mi Confesión"—Gotan Project	Sentenced

The versus
Couple	Judges' votes	Dance	Music	Result
Stephanie & Licky	Stephanie, Stephanie, Stephanie, Stephanie	Cumbia	"Yo Lo Quería"—Marisol y La Magia del Norte	Winners (2 ptos)
Conejo & Fabianne	Stephanie, Stephanie, Stephanie, Stephanie	Cumbia	"Corazón de Piedra"—Tony Rosado e Internacional Pacifico	Losers
Belén & Gian Frank	Belén, Belén, Karen, Karen	Cumbia	"30 Segundos"—Marisol y La Magia del Norte	Tie (1 pto)
Karen & Edward	Belén, Belén, Karen, Karen	Cumbia	"Te Eché al Olvido"—Tony Rosado e Internacional Pacifico	Tie (1 pto)

- Public's favorite couple: Conejo & Fabianne (2 pts).

*The duel

- Stephanie & Licky: Eliminated
- Karen & Edward: Safe

=== Week 12: Finals ===
On the first part, all couples danced festejo while only the sentenced couples danced mix (mambo/cha-cha-cha/samba).

On the second part, the final two couples danced a favorite dance and quickstep.

Running order (Part 1)

Couple	Scores	Dance	Music	Result
Karen & Edward	39 (8, 7, 8, 8, 8)	Festejo	"El Alcatraz"—Arturo "Zambo" Cavero & Óscar Avilés	—
El Conejo & Fabianne	42 (9, 8, 8, 8, 9)	Festejo	"Chacombo"—Arturo "Zambo" Cavero	Third place
El Conejo & Fabianne	43 (9, 9, 8, 8, 9)	Mambo; Cha-cha-cha; Samba	"Mambo Nº8"—Perez Prado "Traigo una Pena"—Maná "Mas que Nada"—Sérgio Mendes feat. The Black Eyed Peas	Third place
Belén & Gian Frank	45 (9, 9, 9, 9, 9)	Festejo	"Negrito de las Huayronas"—Lucila Campos	Safe
Belén & Gian Frank	47 (9, 9, 10, 10, 9)	Mambo; Cha-cha-cha; Samba	"Qué Rico Mambo"—Perez Prado "La Negra Tiene Tumbao"—Celia Cruz "Hey Mama"—The Black Eyed Peas	Safe

Running order (Part 2)

Couple	Scores	Dance	Music	Result
Karen & Edward	47 (10, 10, 9, 9, 9)	Salsa	"Ran Kan Kan"—Tito Puente	Runner up
Karen & Edward	43 (8, 9, 9, 8, 9)	Quickstep	"Hey Pachuco"—Royal Crown Revue	Runner up
Belén & Gian Frank	49 (10, 10, 10, 10, 9)	Jazz	"All That Jazz"—Liza Minnelli	Winners
Belén & Gian Frank	46 (9, 9, 10, 9, 9)	Quickstep	"Life Goes to a Party"— Harry James	Winners

== Dance chart ==
The celebrities and their dreamers will dance one of these routines for each corresponding week:

- Week 1: Latin pop (Latin Pop)
- Week 2: Cumbia & the danceathon (Cumbia)
- Week 3: Disco (Disco)
- Week 4: One unlearned dance & the danceathon (World Dances)
- Week 5: Merengue, team dances & the danceathon (Merengue)
- Week 6: Pop, team dances & the danceathon (The Pop Divas)
- Week 7: Hip-Hop, the danceathon & the versus (Hip-hop)
- Week 8: Trio salsa, the danceathon & the versus (Timba)
- Week 9: Trio tex-mex, strip dance & the danceathon (Trio Tex-Mex/Strip Dance)
- Week 10: Rock and roll, merengue & the danceathon (Quarterfinals)
- Week 11: Salsa, tango & the versus (Semifinals)
- Week 12: Festejo, mix (mambo/cha-cha-cha/samba), favorite dance & quickstep (Finals)

Couple	Week 1	Week 2	Week 3	Week 4	Week 5	Week 6	Week 7	Week 8	Week 9		Week 10		Week 11		Week 12			
Belen & Gian Frank	Latin pop	Cumbia	Disco	Samba	Merengue	Pop	Hip-hop	Salsa	Tex-mex	Strip dance	Rock and roll	Merengue	Salsa	Tango	Festejo	Mix	Jazz	Quickstep
Karen & Edward	Latin pop	Cumbia	Disco	Tarantella	Jazz	Pop	Hip-hop	Salsa	Pachanga	Strip dance	Rock and roll	Merengue	Salsa	Pachanga	Festejo	—	Salsa	Quickstep
Conejo & Fabianne	Latin pop	Cumbia	Disco	Timba	Merengue	Pop	Hip-hop	Salsa	Tex-mex	Strip dance	Rock and roll	Pachanga	Salsa	Tango	Festejo	Mix		
Stephanie & Licky	Latin pop	Cumbia	Disco	Country	Merengue	Pop	Hip-hop	Salsa	Tex-mex	Strip dance	Rock and roll	Merengue	Salsa	Pachanga				
Fernando & Whitney	Latin pop	Cumbia	Disco	Paso doble	Merengue	Pop	Hip-hop	Salsa	Tex-mex	Strip dance	Rock and roll	Pachanga						
Mauricio & Akemi	Latin pop	Cumbia	Disco	Marinera	Merengue	Pop	Disco	Salsa	Pachanga	Strip dance								
Angie & Ruben	Latin pop	Cumbia	Disco	Can-can	Merengue	Axé	Hip-hop	Salsa										
Rebeca & Moises	Latin pop	Cumbia	Disco	Rumba flamenca	Merengue	Pop	Disco											
Adolfo & Lleruza	Latin pop	Cumbia	Disco	Tango	Merengue	Axé												
Carlos & Fiorella	Latin pop	Cumbia	Latin pop	Bollywood	Jazz													
Melissa & Brian	Latin pop	Cumbia	Disco	Belly dance														
Jaime & Carol	Latin pop	Cumbia	Latin pop															

Modalities of competition
Couple	Week 2	Week 4	Week 5		Week 6		Week 7		Week 8		Week 9	Week 10	Week 11
Belen & Gian Frank	Salsa	Cumbia	Hula	Salsa	Jazz	Salsa	Cha-cha-cha	Guaracha	Cumbia	Strip dance	Cumbia	Cumbia	Cumbia
Karen & Edward	Salsa	Cumbia	Hula	Salsa	Jazz	Salsa	Cha-cha-cha	Guaracha	Cumbia	Strip dance	Cumbia	Cumbia	Cumbia
Conejo & Fabianne	Salsa	Cumbia	Hula	Salsa	Jazz	Salsa	Cha-cha-cha	Guaracha	Cumbia	Strip dance	Cumbia	Cumbia	Cumbia
Stephanie & Licky	Salsa	Cumbia	Hula	Salsa	Jazz	Salsa	Cha-cha-cha	Guaracha	Cumbia	Strip dance	Cumbia	Cumbia	Cumbia
Fernando & Whitney	Salsa	Cumbia	Hula	Salsa	Jazz	Salsa	Cha-cha-cha	Guaracha	Cumbia	Strip dance	Cumbia	Cumbia	
Mauricio & Akemi	Salsa	Cumbia	Hula	Salsa	Jazz	Salsa	Cha-cha-cha	Guaracha	Cumbia	Strip dance	Cumbia		
Angie & Ruben	Salsa	Cumbia	Hula	Salsa	Jazz	Salsa	Cha-cha-cha	Guaracha	Cumbia	Strip dance			
Rebeca & Moises	Salsa	Cumbia	Hula	Salsa	Jazz	Salsa	Cha-cha-cha	Guaracha					
Adolfo & Lleruza	Salsa	Cumbia	Hula	Salsa	Jazz	Salsa							
Carlos & Fiorella	Salsa	Cumbia	Hula	Salsa									
Melissa & Brian	Salsa	Cumbia											
Jaime & Carol	Salsa												

Highest scoring dance
Lowest scoring dance
Gained bonus points for winning this dance
Gained no bonus points for losing this dance
In italic indicate the dances performed in the duel
