= El Gran Show season 6 =

El Gran Show: Reyes del Show
- Season 6
- Hosted by: Gisela Valcárcel; Aldo Díaz
- Judges: Morella Petrozzi; Carlos Alcántara; Pachi Valle Riestra
- Celebrity winner: Belén Estévez
- Professional winner: Waldir Felipa
- No. of episodes: 7

Release
- Original network: América Televisión
- Original release: November 5 – December 17, 2011

Season chronology
- ← Previous; Season 5 Next → Season 7

Reyes del Show (English: Show Kings) is the third season of the 2011 edition of El Gran Show premiered on November 5, 2011.

On December 17, 2011, former vedette Belén Estévez and Waldir Felipa were declared the winners, actress & model Maricielo Effio and Elí Vela finished second, while actor Jesús Neyra and Lucero Clavijo were third. Having won for the second time, Estévez thus became the first two-time celebrity champion of the show. During the final week, most former "heroes" who participated in Bailando por un sueño, El show de los sueños, and two years of El gran show, competed in gamblings where the prize was two 0 km cars.

== Cast ==
=== Couples ===
The participating couples of this season were conformed by the first three places of the first and the second season, plus the best fourth position that was determined by the highest average score. During the first week, it was announced that Vanessa Terkes (first season' third place), could not participate for personal issues, for this reason Tati Alcántara (who replaced Maricielo Effio during two weeks in the second season) replaced her.

Celebrity	Notability (known for)	Dreamer	Status
Leslie Shaw	Singer, model & actress	Kevin Ubillus	Eliminated 1st on December 3, 2011
Jean Paul Santa María	Model	Carmen Varillas	Eliminated 2nd on December 10, 2011
Tati Alcántara	Actress & singer	Andy Sandoval	Eliminated 3rd on December 17, 2011
Raúl Zuazo	Actor & film director	Dayana Calla	Eliminated 4th on December 17, 2011
Jesús Neyra	Actor	Lucero Clavijo	Third place on December 17, 2011
Maricielo Effio	Actress & model	Elí Vela	Runner-up on December 17, 2011
Belén Estévez	Former vedette	Waldir Felipa	Winners on December 17, 2011

==== Previous seasons ====
Season	Celebrity	Partner	Average	Place
1	Raúl Zuazo	Dayana Calla	36.9	1.º
1	Leslie Shaw	Kevin Ubillus	36.0	2.º
1	Vanessa Terkes	Andy Sandoval	33.9	3.º
2	Jesús Neyra	Lucero Clavijo	38.1	1.º
2	Belén Estévez	Waldir Felipa	39.0	2.º
2	Maricielo Effio	Eli Vera	38.5	3.º
2	Jean Paul Santa María	Carmen Varillas	35.8	4.º

=== Host and judges ===
Gisela Valcárcel, Aldo Díaz and Cristian Rivero returned as hosts, while Morella Petrozzi, Carlos Alcántara, Pachi Valle Riestra and the VIP Jury returned as judges.

== Scoring charts ==
Couple	Place	1	2	3	4	5	6	7		
Couple	Place	1	2	3	4	5	6	Top 5	Top 4	Top 3
Belén & Waldir	1	51	55	53	52	85	85	40	42	+43=125
Maricielo & Elí	2	49	53	55	54	82	84	41	42	+43=126
Jesús & Lucero	3	51	47	53	50	82	77	41	40	+43=124
Raúl & Dayana	4	46	49	44	49	77	75	40	40	
Tati & Andy	5	53	50	48	54	81	78	41		
Jean Paul & Carmen	6	49	48	53	50	76	76			
Leslie & Kevin	7	44	52	49	45	75				

Red numbers indicate the sentenced for each week
Green numbers indicate the best steps for each week
the couple was eliminated that week
the couple was safe in the duel
the couple was eliminated that week and safe with a lifeguard
the winning couple
the runner-up couple
the third-place couple

=== Average score chart ===
This table only counts dances scored on a 40-point scale (the 11 scores were changed to 10).

Rank by average	Place	Couple	Total points	Number of dances	Average
1	1	Belén & Waldir	437	11	39.7
2	2	Maricielo & Elí	436	11	39.6
3	5	Tati & Andy	351	9	39.0
4	3	Jesús & Lucero	428	11	38.9
5	4	Raúl & Dayana	380	10	38.0
6	6	Jean Paul & Carmen	300	8	37.5
7	7	Leslie & Kevin	223	6	37.2

=== Highest and lowest scoring performances ===
The best and worst performances in each dance according to the judges' 40-point scale (the 11 scores were changed to 10) are as follows:

Dance	Highest scored dancer(s)	Highest score	Lowest scored dancer(s)	Lowest score
Disco	Belén Estévez; Jean Paul Santa María	40	Leslie Shaw	34
Latin pop	Belén Estévez; Maricielo Effio; Tati Alcántara	40	Jean Paul Santa María; Jesús Neyra	37
Samba	Leslie Shaw	40	Jean Paul Santa María	38
Salsa	Belén Estévez; Maricielo Effio; Jesús Neyra; Raúl Zuazo; Tati Alcántara	40	Leslie Shaw	36
Merengue house	Maricielo Effio	40	Raúl Zuazo	35
Hip-hop	Tati Alcántara	39	Jean Paul Santa María; Raúl Zuazo	38
Jive	Tati Alcántara	40	Jesús Neyra	39
Tex-Mex	Belén Estévez; Maricielo Effio	40	Leslie Shaw	35
Paso doble	Jesús Neyra	40	—	—
Tango	Maricielo Effio	40	—	—
Festejo	Raúl Zuazo	40	—	—
Cha-cha-cha	Belén Estévez	40	—	—
Merengue	Belén Estévez; Jesús Neyra; Tati Alcántara	40	Raúl Zuazo	37
Guaracha	Belén Estévez; Maricielo Effio; Jesús Neyra; Tati Alcántara	40	—	—
Pachanga	Belén Estévez; Maricielo Effio; Jesús Neyra; Raúl Zuazo	40	—	—
Rumba	Belén Estévez; Maricielo Effio; Jesús Neyra	40	—	—

=== Couples' highest and lowest scoring dances ===
Scores are based upon a potential 40-point maximum (the 11 scores were changed to 10).

Couples	Highest scoring dance(s)	Lowest scoring dance(s)
Belén & Waldir	Latin pop, Tex-Mex, Cha-cha-cha, Merengue, Guaracha, Disco, Salsa, Pachanga & Rumba (40)	Disco (38)
Maricielo & Elí	Latin pop, Merengue house, Tex-Mex, Tango, Guaracha, Salsa, Pachanga & Rumba (40)	Disco (38)
Jesús & Lucero	Paso doble, Merengue, Salsa, Pachanga & Rumba (40)	Disco (36)
Raúl & Dayana	Festejo, Salsa & Pachanga (40)	Merengue house (35)
Tati & Andy	Latin pop, Jive, Guaracha & Salsa (40)	Disco (37)
Jean Paul & Cármen	Disco (40)	Disco (35)
Leslie & Kevin	Samba (40)	Disco (34)

== Weekly scores ==
Individual judges' scores in the charts below (given in parentheses) are listed in this order from left to right: Morella Petrozzi, Carlos Alcántara, Pachi Valle Riestra, VIP Jury.

=== Week 1: Disco Night ===
Individual judges' scores in the chart below (given in parentheses) are listed in this order from left to right: Morella Petrozzi, Carlos Alcántara, Pachi Valle Riestra, Federico Salazar, VIP Jury.

The couples danced disco. In the versus, the couples faced dancing cumbia, while in the little train, the participants faced dancing strip dance.

Running order

Couple	Scores	Dance	Music	Result
Raúl & Dayana	46 (9, 9, 8, 10, 10)	Disco	"Boogie Wonderland"—Earth, Wind & Fire	Sentenced
Leslie & Kevin	44 (8, 8, 9, 9, 10)	Disco	"Disco Inferno"—The Trammps	Sentenced
Tati & Andy	51 (11, 10, 9, 11, 10)	Disco	"On The Radio"—Donna Summer	Best steps
Jesús & Lucero	48 (9, 9, 10, 10, 10)	Disco	"Don't Stop 'Til You Get Enough"—Michael Jackson	Safe
Belén & Waldir	48 (10, 9, 10, 9, 10)	Disco	"Last Dance"—Donna Summer	Safe
Maricielo & Elí	49 (9, 11, 9, 10, 10)	Disco	"Knock on Wood"—Amii Stewart	Safe
Jean Paul & Carmen	45 (9, 9, 8, 9, 10)	Disco	"You Should Be Dancing"—Bee Gees	Safe

The versus
Couple	Judges' votes	Dance	Music	Result
Jesús & Lucero	Jesús, Jesús, Jesús, Raúl	Cumbia	"Dos locos"—Los Villacorta	Winners (2 pts)
Raúl & Dayana	Jesús, Jesús, Jesús, Raúl	Cumbia	"La amante"—Grupo 5	Losers
Jean Paul & Carmen	Jean Paul, Jean Paul, Maricielo, Tati	Cumbia	"Amor de mis amores"—Grupo 5	Winners (2 pts)
Tati & Andy	Jean Paul, Jean Paul, Maricielo, Tati	Cumbia	"La caderona"—Los Vilacorta	Losers
Maricielo & Elí	Jean Paul, Jean Paul, Maricielo, Tati	Cumbia	"Me gusta"—Tommy Portugal y La Pasión	Losers
Belén & Waldir	Belén, Leslie, Belén, Belén	Cumbia	"Gitana"—Marisol y La Magia del Norte	Winners (2 pts)
Leslie & Kevin	Belén, Leslie, Belén, Belén	Cumbia	"Canalla"—Marisol y La Magia del Norte	Losers

The little train
Participants	Judges' votes	Dance	Music	Result
Women	Carmen, Carmen, Tati, Maricielo	Strip dance	"Single Ladies (Put a Ring on It)"—Beyoncé	Carmen (2 pts)
Men	Andy, Andy, Andy, Raúl	Strip dance	"Pégate"—Ricky Martin	Andy (2 pts)

=== Week 2: Latin Pop Night ===
Individual judges' scores in the chart below (given in parentheses) are listed in this order from left to right: Morella Petrozzi, Carlos Alcántara, Pachi Valle Riestra, Fiorella Rodríguez, VIP Jury.

The couples (except those sentenced) danced latin pop. In the versus, the couples faced dancing reggaeton, while in the little train, the participants faced dancing strip dance.

Running order

Couple	Scores	Dance	Music	Result
Tati & Andy	49 (10, 10, 10, 10, 9)	Latin pop	"Loca"—Shakira	Safe
Belén & Waldir	54 (11, 11, 11, 11, 10)	Latin pop	"Rabiosa"—Shakira	Best steps
Leslie & Kevin	49 (10, 10, 10, 10, 9)	Samba*	"Festa Do Interior"—Gal Costa / "Arranca en Fá"—Sonora Carruseles	Safe
Raúl & Dayana	49 (9, 10, 10, 10, 10)	Salsa*	"La Vida Es Un Carnaval" / "La Negra Tiene Tumbao" —Celia Cruz	Safe
Jean Paul & Carmen	46 (9, 10, 9, 9, 9)	Latin pop	"Dame Más"—Ricky Martin	Sentenced
Maricielo & Elí	50 (10, 10, 10, 11, 9)	Latin pop	"Tu Veneno"—Natalia Oreiro	Safe
Jesús & Lucero	47 (9, 10, 9, 9, 10)	Latin pop	"Salomé"—Chayanne	Sentenced

The versus
Couple	Judges' votes	Dance	Music	Result
Maricielo & Elí	Maricielo, Maricielo, Maricielo, Maricielo	Reggaeton	"Quema, Quema"—Aldo y Dandy	Winners (2 pts)
Tati & Andy	Maricielo, Maricielo, Maricielo, Maricielo	Reggaeton	"Cójela Que Va Sin Jockey"—Daddy Yankee	Losers
Jean Paul & Carmen	Belén, Jesús, Jean Paul, Jean Paul	Reggaeton	"El Ritmo No Perdona (Prende)"—Daddy Yankee	Winners (2 pts)
Belén & Waldir	Belén, Jesús, Jean Paul, Jean Paul	Reggaeton	"Ella Se Arrebata"—Latin Fresh	Losers
Jesús & Lucero	Belén, Jesús, Jean Paul, Jean Paul	Reggaeton	"Mayor Que Yo"—Luny Tunes	Losers
Leslie & Kevin	Leslie, Leslie, Leslie, Leslie	Reggaeton	"Tembleque"—John Erick	Winners (2 pts)
Raúl & Dayana	Leslie, Leslie, Leslie, Leslie	Reggaeton	"Ella Me Levantó"—Daddy Yankee	Losers

The little train
Participants	Judges' votes	Dance	Music	Result
Women	Maricielo, Tati, Maricielo, Tati	Strip dance	"Poker Face"—Lady Gaga	Tati, Maricielo (1 pt)
Men	Kevin, Waldir, Waldir, Kevin	Strip dance	"Lick It"—20 Fingers feat. Roula	Kevin, Waldir (1 pt)

*The duel

- Leslie & Kevin: Eliminated (but safe with the lifeguard)
- Raúl & Dayana: Safe

=== Week 3: Merengue House Night ===
Individual judges' scores in the charts below (given in parentheses) are listed in this order from left to right: Morella Petrozzi, Carlos Alcántara, Pachi Valle Riestra, Bettina Oneto, VIP Jury.

The couples (except those sentenced) danced merengue house. In the versus, the couples faced dancing adagio, while in the little train, the participants faced dancing strip dance.

Running order

Couple	Scores	Dance	Music	Result
Belén & Waldir	51 (11, 11, 9, 10, 10)	Merengue house	"El Tiburón"—Proyecto Uno	Safe
Raúl & Dayana	44 (8, 9, 8, 10, 9)	Merengue house	"Dame de Eso"—Ilegales	Sentenced
Maricielo & Elí	53 (11, 11, 11, 10, 10)	Merengue house	"La Morena"—Ilegales	Best steps
Jean Paul & Carmen	48 (10, 10, 8, 10, 10)	Hip-hop*	"Destination Calabria"—Alex Gaudino feat. Crystal Waters	Safe
Jesús & Lucero	51 (11, 11, 9, 11, 10)	Jive*	"Proud Mary"—Tina Turner	Safe
Leslie & Kevin	49 (9, 10, 10, 10, 10)	Merengue house	"Fiesta Caliente"—Ilegales	Safe
Tati & Andy	48 (10, 10, 9, 9, 10)	Merengue house	"Taqui Taqui"—Ilegales	Sentenced

The versus
Couple	Judges' votes	Dance	Music	Result
Maricielo & Elí	Maricielo, Maricielo, Maricielo, Maricielo	Adagio	"No Me Doy por Vencido"—Luis Fonsi	Ganadores (2pts)
Leslie & Kevin	Maricielo, Maricielo, Maricielo, Maricielo	Adagio	"Algo Más"—La Quinta Estación	Perdedores
Belén & Waldir	Belén, Belén, Tati, Raúl	Adagio	"Herida"—Myriam Hernández	Ganadores (2pts)
Raúl & Dayana	Belén, Belén, Tati, Raúl	Adagio	"Entrégate"—Luis Miguel	Perdedores
Tati & Andy	Belén, Belén, Tati, Raúl	Adagio	"Detrás de Mi Ventana"—Yuri	Perdedores
Jesús & Lucero	Jean Paul, Jesús, Jean Paul, Jesús	Adagio	"Vuelve"—Ricky Martin	Tie (1 pt)
Jean Paul & Carmen	Jean Paul, Jesús, Jean Paul, Jesús	Adagio	"Entra En Mi Vida"—Sin Bandera	Tie (1 pt)

The little train
Participants	Judges' votes	Dance	Music	Result
Women	Maricielo, Carmen, Carmen, Belén	Strip dance	"Unbelievable"—EMF	Carmen (2 pts)
Men	Jean Paul, Elí, Jesús, Jean Paul	Strip dance	"100% Pure Love"—Crystal Waters	Jean Paul (2 pts)

*The duel

- Jean Paul & Carmen: Eliminated (but safe with the lifeguard)
- Jesús & Lucero: Safe

=== Week 4: Tex-Mex Night ===
The couples (except those sentenced) danced tex-mex. In the versus, the couples faced dancing salsa, while in the little train, the participants faced dancing strip dance.

Running order

Couple	Scores	Dance	Music	Result
Leslie & Kevin	44 (8, 9, 9, 9, 9)	Tex-mex	"El Chico del Apartamento 512"—Selena	Sentenced
Belén & Waldir	52 (11, 11, 10, 10, 10)	Tex-mex	"Bidi Bidi Bom Bom"—Selena	Safe
Raúl & Dayana	48 (9, 10, 9, 10, 10)	Hip-hop*	"Papi"—Jennifer Lopez	Sentenced
Tati & Andy	49 (11, 10, 9, 9, 10)	Hip-hop*	"Get Me Bodied" / "Run the World (Girls)"—Beyoncé	Safe
Jesús & Lucero	49 (10, 9, 10, 10, 10)	Tex-mex	"Techno Cumbia"—Selena	Safe
Jean Paul & Carmen	49 (9, 10, 10, 10, 10)	Tex-mex	"No Tengo Dinero"—Kumbia Kings feat. Juan Gabriel y El Gran Silencio	Safe
Maricielo & Elí	52 (11, 11, 10, 10, 10)	Tex-mex	"Baila Esta Cumbia"—Selena	Best steps

The versus
Couple	Judges' votes	Dance	Music	Result
Maricielo & Elí	Maricielo, Maricielo, Maricielo, Maricielo	Salsa	"Temba, Tumba, Timba"—Los Van Van	Winners (2 pts)
Belén & Waldir	Maricielo, Maricielo, Maricielo, Maricielo	Salsa	"Juana Magdalena"—La Charanga Habanera	Losers
Jesús & Lucero	Leslie, Leslie, Jesús, Jesús	Salsa	"Muévete"—La Charanga Habanera	Tie (2 pts)
Leslie & Kevin	Leslie, Leslie, Jesús, Jesús	Salsa	"El Temba"—La Charanga Habanera	Tie (2 pts)
Jean Paul & Carmen	Leslie, Leslie, Jesús, Jesús	Salsa	"Gozando en La Habana"—La Charanga Habanera	Losers
Tati & Andy	Tati, Tati, Tati, Tati	Salsa	"El Águila"—Manolito y su Trabuco	Winners (2 pts)
Raúl & Dayana	Tati, Tati, Tati, Tati	Salsa	"Abre Que Voy"—Los Van Van	Losers

The little train
Participants	Judges' votes (Note: Because Gisela Valcarcél was not present during the little train, Judge Carlos Alcántara replaced her, so only 3 judges cast their vote.)	Dance	Music	Result
Women	Carmen, Dayana, Tati	Strip dance	"Toxic"—Britney Spears	Dayana, Carmen, Tati (1 pt)
Men	Andy, Andy, Andy	Strip dance	"Arde Papi"—Bárbara Love	Andy (2 pts)

*The duel

- Raúl & Dayana: Safe
- Tati & Andy: Eliminated (but safe with the lifeguard)

=== Week 5: Quarterfinals ===
Individual judges' scores in the charts below (given in parentheses) are listed in this order from left to right: Morella Petrozzi, Carlos Alcántara, Pachi Valle Riestra, VIP Jury.

The couples performed one unlearned ballroom dance (except those sentenced) and merengue.

Running order

Couple	Scores	Dance	Music	Result
Jesús & Lucero	42 (11, 11, 10, 10)	Paso doble	"España cañí"—Pascual Marquina Narro	Safe
Jesús & Lucero	40 (10, 10, 10, 10)	Merengue	"El Baile Del Perrito"—Wilfrido Vargas	Safe
Maricielo & Eli	43 (11, 11, 11, 10)	Tango	"Tanguera"—Sexteto Mayor	Safe
Maricielo & Eli	39 (10, 10, 9, 10)	Merengue	"Abusadora"—Wilfrido Vargas	Safe
Tati & Andy	41 (10, 11, 10, 10)	Jive	"Wake Me Up Before You Go-Go"—Wham!	Safe
Tati & Andy	39 (10, 9, 10, 10)	Merengue	"El Baile Del Mono"—Wilfrido Vargas	Safe
Jean Paul & Carmen	38 (9, 10, 10, 9)	Samba	"Magalenha"—Sérgio Mendes feat. Carlinhos Brown	Sentenced
Jean Paul & Carmen	38 (9, 10, 9, 10)	Merengue	"El Negro No Puede"—Las Chicas del Can	Sentenced
Leslie & Kevin	36 (9, 9, 9, 9)	Salsa*	"Que Se Sepa"—Roberto Roena	—
Leslie & Kevin	39 (11, 9, 9, 10)	Merengue	"Juana la Cubana"—Las Chicas del Can	—
Raúl & Dayana	40 (10, 10, 10, 10)	Festejo*	"Le Dije A Papá"—Eva Ayllón	Sentenced
Raúl & Dayana	37 (9, 9, 9, 10)	Merengue	"Ta' Pillao"—Wilfrido Vargas	Sentenced
Belén & Waldir	42 (11, 11, 10, 10)	Cha-cha-cha	"Oye Como Va"—Santana	Best steps
Belén & Waldir	43 (11, 11, 11, 10)	Merengue	"El Santo Cachón"—Las Chicas del Can	Best steps

*The duel

- Leslie & Kevin: Eliminated
- Raúl & Dayana: Safe

=== Week 6: Semifinals ===
The couples danced guaracha (except those sentenced), disco and a danceathon of reggaeton.

Running order

Couple	Scores	Dance	Music	Result
Maricielo & Elí	43 (11, 11, 11, 10)	Guaracha	"El Negrito del Batey"—Alberto Beltrán	Safe
Maricielo & Elí	39 (10, 10, 9, 10)	Disco	"I Will Survive"—Deja Vu	Safe
Jesús & Lucero	39 (10, 10, 9, 10)	Guaracha	"Caramelo al Kilo"—Alquimia	Safe
Jesús & Lucero	36 (9, 9, 9, 9)	Disco	"Boogie Wonderland"—Deja Vu	Safe
Jean Paul & Carmen	35 (8, 9, 8, 10)	Latin pop*	"Locovox"—Locomía	—
Jean Paul & Carmen	40 (10, 10, 10, 10)	Disco	"Last Dance"—Donna Summer	—
Raúl & Dayana	36 (8, 9, 9, 10)	Latin pop*	"Oye!" / "Conga"—Gloria Estefan	Safe
Raúl & Dayana	39 (9, 10, 10, 10)	Disco	"Turn the Beat Around"—Gloria Estefan	Safe
Belén & Waldir	43 (11, 11, 11, 10)	Guaracha	"Juancito Trucupey"—Alquimia	Best steps
Belén & Waldir	42 (11, 11, 10, 10)	Disco	"Disco Inferno"—Deja Vu	Best steps
Tati & Andy	40 (10, 10, 10, 10)	Guaracha	"La Mamá y la Hija"—Alquimia	Safe
Tati & Andy	37 (10, 9, 9, 9)	Disco	"Born to Be Alive"—Deja Vu	Safe
Tati & Andy; Maricielo & Elí; Belén & Waldir; Jesús & Lucero; Jean Paul & Carmen; Raúl & Dayana	2	Reggaetón (The danceathon)	"El Baile del Choque"—Lorna feat. Mr Saik	

*The duel

- Jean Paul & Carmen: Eliminated
- Raúl & Dayana: Safe

=== Week 7: Finals ===
On the first part, the couples danced trio salsa involving another celebrity.

On the second part, the three remaining couples danced pachanga.

On the third night, the final three couples danced rumba.

Running order (Part 1)

Couple (Trio Dance Partner)	Scores	Dance	Music	Result
Raúl & Dayana (Gisela Ponce de León)	40 (10, 10, 10, 10)	Salsa	"La Carátula"—La Charanga Habanera	Safe
Belén & Waldir (Jean Paul Santa María)	40 (10, 10, 10, 10)	Salsa	"Gozando en La Habana"—La Charanga Habanera	Safe
Tati & Andy (Marco Zunino)	41 (10, 11, 10, 10)	Salsa	"Juana Magdalena"—La Charanga Habanera	Eliminated
Maricielo & Elí (Mario Hart)	41 (10, 11, 10, 10)	Salsa	"La Miradita"—La Charanga Habanera	Safe
Jesús & Lucero (Gianella Neyra)	41 (10, 11, 10, 10)	Salsa	"La Chica Más Bella"—La Charanga Habanera	Safe

Running order (Part 2)

Couple	Scores	Dance	Music	Result
Maricielo & Elí	43 (11, 11, 11, 10)	Pachanga	"Bon, Bon"—Pitbull	Safe
Jesús & Lucero	40 (10, 10, 10, 10)	Pachanga	"Bla Bla Bla"—El Potro Álvarez feat. Chino & Nacho	Safe
Raúl & Dayana	40 (10, 10, 10, 10)	Pachanga	"Lo Que No Sabes Tú"—Chino & Nacho feat. El Potro Alvárez y Baroni	Eliminated
Belén & Waldir	43 (11, 11, 11, 10)	Pachanga	"Danza Kuduro"—Don Omar feat. Lucenzo	Safe

Running order (Part 3)

Couple	Scores	Dance	Music	Result
Jesús & Lucero	43 (11, 11, 11, 10)	Rumba	"Vuélveme a Querer"—Christian Castro	Third place
Belén & Waldir	43 (11, 11, 11, 10)	Rumba	"Refugio de Amor"—Chayanne feat. Vanessa Williams	Winners
Maricielo & Elí	43 (11, 11, 11, 10)	Rumba	"Hasta Que Vuelvas Conmigo"—Gian Marco	Runner-up

== Dance chart ==
The celebrities and their dreamers will dance one of these routines for each corresponding week:

- Week 1: Disco, the versus & the little train (Disco Night)
- Week 2: Latin pop, the versus & the little train (Latin Pop Night)
- Week 3: Merengue house, the versus & the little train (Merengue House Night)
- Week 4: Tex-mex, the versus & the little train (Tex-Mex Night)
- Week 5: Ballroom dances & merengue (Quarterfinals)
- Week 6: Guaracha, disco & the danceathon (Semifinals)
- Week 7: Salsa, pachanga & rumba (Finals)

Couple	Week 1	Week 2	Week 3	Week 4	Week 5		Week 6		Week 7		
Belén & Waldir	Disco	Latin pop	Merengue house	Tex-mex	Cha-cha-cha	Merengue	Guaracha	Disco	Salsa	Pachanga	Rumba
Maricielo & Elí	Disco	Latin pop	Merengue house	Tex-mex	Tango	Merengue	Guaracha	Disco	Salsa	Pachanga	Rumba
Jesús & Lucero	Disco	Latin pop	Jive	Tex-mex	Paso doble	Merengue	Guaracha	Disco	Salsa	Pachanga	Rumba
Raúl & Dayana	Disco	Salsa	Merengue house	Hip-hop	Festejo	Merengue	Latin pop	Disco	Salsa	Pachanga	
Tati & Andy	Disco	Latin pop	Merengue house	Hip-hop	Jive	Merengue	Guaracha	Disco	Salsa		
Jean Paul & Cármen	Disco	Latin pop	Hip-hop	Tex-mex	Samba	Merengue	Latin pop	Disco			
Leslie & Kevin	Disco	Samba	Merengue house	Tex-mex	Salsa	Merengue					

Modalities of competition
Couple	Week 1		Week 2		Week 3		Week 4		Week 6
Belén & Waldir	Cumbia	Strip dance	Reggaeton	Strip dance	Adagio	Strip dance	Salsa	Strip dance	Reggaeton
Maricielo & Elí	Cumbia	Strip dance	Reggaeton	Strip dance	Adagio	Strip dance	Salsa	Strip dance	Reggaeton
Jesús & Lucero	Cumbia	Strip dance	Reggaeton	Strip dance	Adagio	Strip dance	Salsa	Strip dance	Reggaeton
Raúl & Dayana	Cumbia	Strip dance	Reggaeton	Strip dance	Adagio	Strip dance	Salsa	Strip dance	Reggaeton
Tati & Andy	Cumbia	Strip dance	Reggaeton	Strip dance	Adagio	Strip dance	Salsa	Strip dance	Reggaeton
Jean Paul & Cármen	Cumbia	Strip dance	Reggaeton	Strip dance	Adagio	Strip dance	Salsa	Strip dance	Reggaeton
Leslie & Kevin	Cumbia	Strip dance	Reggaeton	Strip dance	Adagio	Strip dance	Salsa	Strip dance	

Highest scoring dance
Lowest scoring dance
Gained bonus points for winning this dance
Gained no bonus points for losing this dance
In italic indicate the dances performed in the duel

== Guest judges ==
From week 1 to 4, a celebrity guest judge was present at the judges table to comment on and score the dance routines.

Date	Guest judge	Occupation(s)	Ref.
November 5, 2011	Federico Salazar	Journalist and TV host	
November 12, 2011	Fiorella Rodríguez	Actress and TV host	
November 19, 2011	Bettina Oneto	Showoman, actress and comedian	
26 de noviembre de 2011	Bettina Oneto	Showoman, actress and comedian	
