= El Gran Show season 3 =

El Gran Show: Reyes del Show
- Season 3
- Hosted by: Gisela Valcárcel; Aldo Díaz; Cristian Rivero
- Judges: Morella Petrozzi; Carlos Alcántara; Pachi Valle Riestra; Stuart Bishop
- Celebrity winner: Miguel "Conejo" Rebosio
- Professional winner: Fabianne Hayashida
- No. of episodes: 7

Release
- Original network: América Televisión
- Original release: November 6 – December 8, 2010

Season chronology
- ← Previous; Season 2 Next → Season 4

Reyes del Show (English: Show Kings) is the season three of the 2010 edition of El Gran Show premiered on November 6, 2010.

On December 18, 2010, Miguel "Conejo" Rebosio and Fabianne Hayashida were crowned champions, Belén Estévez & Gian Frank Navarro finished second, while Gisela Ponce de León & Rayder Vásquez were third.

== Cast ==
=== Couples ===
The couples that competed this season were the top three places in the first and second seasons, the best fourth place (determined by the highest average scores) who were Stephanie Orué and Licky Barreto, and a couple invited by the jury, being Fernando Roca Rey and Whitney Misme.

In the first week, it was announced that two heroines could not compete due to work reasons: Stephanie Orué, who was replaced by Rebeca Escribens (eighth place of the second season), and Maricarmen Marín, who was replaced by Pierina Carcelen (seventh put in the first season).

Celebrity	Notability (known for)	Dreamer	Status
Rebeca Escribens	Actress & TV host	Licky Barreto	Eliminated 1st on November 13, 2010
Jesús Neyra	Actor	Cindy Tello	Eliminated 2nd on November 20, 2010
Pierina Carcelén	Actress & model	Diego Alza	Eliminated 3rd on November 27, 2010
Fernando Roca Rey	Bullfighter	Whitney Misme	Eliminated 4th on December 4, 2010
Karen Dejo	Actress & TV host	Edward Mávila	Eliminated 5th on December 11, 2010
Gisela Ponce de León	Actress & singer	Rayder Vásquez	Third place on December 18, 2010
Belén Estévez	Former vedette	Gian Frank Navarro	Runner-up on December 18, 2010
Miguel "Conejo" Rebosio	Former football player	Fabianne Hayashida	Winners on December 18, 2010

==== Previous seasons ====
Season	Celebrity	Partner	Average	Place
1	Gisela Ponce de León	Rayder Vásquez	33.4	1.º
1	Jesús Neyra	Cindy Tello	29.8	2.º
1	Maricarmen Marín	Diego Alza	29.2	3.º
2	Belén Estévez	Gian Frank Navarro	36.4	1.º
2	Karen Dejo	Edward Mávila	33.0	2.º
2	Miguel "Conejo" Rebosio	Fabianne Hayashida	32.6	3.º
2	Stephanie Orué	Licky Barreto	33.6	4.º
2	Fernando Roca Rey	Whitney Misme	33.1	5.º

=== Host and judges ===
Gisela Valcárcel, Aldo Díaz and Cristian Rivero returned as hosts, while Morella Petrozzi, Carlos Alcántara, Pachi Valle Riestra, Stuart Bishop and the VIP Jury returned as judges.

== Scoring charts ==
Couple	Place	1	2	3	4	5	6	7	
Couple	Place	1	2	3	4	5	6	Top 3	Top 2
Conejo & Fabianne	1	40	46	41	91	84	87	84	+88=172
Belén & Gian Frank	2	41	47	47	89	90	96	93	+95=188
Gisela & Rayder	3	40	44	45	86	87	86	82	
Karen & Edward	4	45	46	49	91	84	94		
Fernando & Whitney	5	38	46	45	75	82			
Pierina & Diego	6	34	42	45	77				
Jesús & Cindy	7	50	41	42					
Rebeca & Licky	8	36	43						

Red numbers indicate the sentenced for each week
Green numbers indicate the best steps for each week
the couple was eliminated that week
the couple was safe in the duel
the winning couple
the runner-up couple
the third-place couple

=== Average score chart ===
This table only counts dances scored on a 40-point scale (the VIP Jury scores are excluded).

Rank by average	Place	Couple	Total points	Number of dances	Average
1	2	Belén & Gian Frank	482	13	37.1
2	4	Karen & Edward	309	9	34.3
3	1	Conejo & Fabianne	443	13	34.1
4	3	Gisela & Rayder	368	11	33.4
5	7	Jesús & Cindy	100	3	33.3
6	5	Fernando & Whitney	223	7	31.9
7	6	Pierina & Diego	156	5	31.2
8	8	Rebeca & Licky	61	2	30.5

=== Highest and lowest scoring performances ===
The best and worst performances in each dance according to the judges' 40-point scale (the VIP Jury scores are excluded) are as follows:

Dance	Highest scored dancer(s)	Highest score	Lowest scored dancer(s)	Lowest score
Ballroom	Jesús Neyra; Belén Estévez; Karen Dejo	38	Pierina Carcelén	25
Pop	Belén Estévez	38	Jesús Neyra	31
Marinera	Rebeca Escribens	34	—	—
Cabaret	Pierina Carcelén	32	—	—
Merengue	Belén Estévez	40	Miguel "Conejo" Rebosio	31
Jazz	Pierina Carcelén; Gisela Ponce de León	37	Jesús Neyra	31
Aerodance	Karen Dejo	36	Pierina Carcelén	28
Disco	Gisela Ponce de León; Belén Estévez	38	Fernando Roca Rey	31
Festejo	Miguel "Conejo" Rebosio	38	—	—
Lambada	Miguel "Conejo" Rebosio; Belén Estévez	36	Fernando Roca Rey	27
Rumba flamenca	Fernando Roca Rey	38	—	—
Bollywood	Belén Estévez	38	Miguel "Conejo" Rebosio; Karen Dejo	31
Salsa	Belén Estévez	37	Gisela Ponce de León	31
Freestyle	Belén Estévez	40	Miguel "Conejo" Rebosio	32
Mix	Belén Estévez	38	Miguel "Conejo" Rebosio	35
Waltz	Belén Estévez	40	Miguel "Conejo" Rebosio	36

=== Couples' highest and lowest scoring dances ===
Scores are based upon a potential 40-point maximum (the VIP Jury scores are excluded).

Couples	Highest scoring dance(s)	Lowest scoring dance(s)
Conejo & Fabianne	Pop, Festejo & Salsa (38)	Jive, Merengue & Bollywood (31)
Belén & Gian Frank	Merengue, Freestyle & Waltz (40)	Aerodance (31)
Gisela & Rayder	Disco (38)	Jive, Aerodance & Salsa (31)
Karen & Edward	Cha-cha-cha (38)	Bollywood (31)
Fernando & Whitney	Rumba flamenca (38)	Lambada (27)
Pierina & Diego	Jazz (37)	Jive (25)
Jesús & Cindy	Jive (38)	Jazz & Merengue (31)
Rebeca & Licky	Marinera (34)	Jive (27)

== Weekly scores ==
Individual judges' scores in the charts below (given in parentheses) are listed in this order from left to right: Morella Petrozzi, Stuart Bishop, Carlos Alcántara, Pachi Valle Riestra, VIP Jury.

=== Week 1: Jive ===
The couples danced jive and a danceathon of cumbia. In the versus, the couples faced dancing salsa.

Running order

Couple	Scores	Dance	Music	Result
Rebeca & Licky	35 (7, 6, 7, 7, 8)	Jive	"Goody Two Shoes"—Adam Ant	Sentenced
Pierina & Diego	33 (7, 5, 7, 6, 8)	Jive	"Wake Me Up Before You Go-Go"—Wham!	Sentenced
Karen & Edward	41 (8, 8, 8, 8, 9)	Jive	"Wait and See"—Fats Domino	Safe
Fernando & Whitney	37 (7, 7, 8, 7, 8)	Jive	"Candyman"—Christina Aguilera	Safe
Conejo & Fabianne	39 (7, 8, 8, 8, 8)	Jive	"Crazy Little Thing Called Love"—Queen	Safe
Gisela & Rayder	40 (8, 7, 8, 8, 9)	Jive	"The Girl Can't Help It"—Little Richard	Safe
Belén & Gian Frank	41 (8, 7, 8, 9, 9)	Jive	"I Love You Cause I Want To"—Carlene Carter	Safe
Jesús & Cindy	46 (10, 9, 10, 9, 8)	Jive	"Proud Mary"—Tina Turner	Best steps
Pierina & Diego; Karen & Edward; Rebeca & Licky; Belén & Gian Frank; Jesús & Cindy; Gisela & Rayder; Conejo & Fabianne; Fernando & Whitney	2	Cumbia (The danceathon)	"Pa' Todos Hay"—Bareto	

The versus
Couple	Judges' votes	Dance	Music	Result
Rebeca & Licky	Fernando, Fernando, Rebeca, Rebeca	Salsa	"En Barranquilla Me Quedo"—Joe Arroyo	Tie (1 pt)
Fernando & Whitney	Fernando, Fernando, Rebeca, Rebeca	Salsa	"Las Cajas"—Joe Arroyo	Tie (1 pt)
Conejo & Fabianne	Conejo, Pierina, Conejo, Pierina	Salsa	"La Rebelión"—Joe Arroyo	Tie (1 pt)
Pierina & Diego	Conejo, Pierina, Conejo, Pierina	Salsa	"La Noche"—Joe Arroyo	Tie (1 pt)
Jesús & Cindy	Jesús, Belén, Jesús, Jesús	Salsa	"Sueño Contigo"—José Alberto "El Canario"	Winners (2 pts)
Belén & Gian Frank	Jesús, Belén, Jesús, Jesús	Salsa	"Discúlpeme Señora"—José Alberto "El Canario"	Losers
Karen & Edward	Karen, Karen, Karen, Gisela	Salsa	"Bailemos Otra Vez"—José Alberto "El Canario"	Winners (2 pts)
Gisela & Rayder	Karen, Karen, Karen, Gisela	Salsa	"Hoy Quiero Confesarme"—José Alberto "El Canario"	Losers

- Public's favorite couple: Karen & Edward (2 pts).

=== Week 2: The Pop Stars ===
The couples danced pop (except those sentenced), a team dance of jazz and a danceathon of pachanga.

Running order

Couple	Scores	Dance	Music	Result
Karen & Edward	42 (9, 8, 8, 8, 9)	Pop	"Let's Get Loud—Jennifer Lopez	Safe
Jesús & Cindy	39 (8, 7, 8, 8, 8)	Pop	"Tik Tok"—Kesha	Sentenced
Gisela & Rayder	42 (9, 6, 9, 9, 9)	Pop	"Me Against the Music"—Britney Spears feat. Madonna	Safe
Rebeca & Licky	43 (8, 8, 9, 9, 9)	Marinera*	"Así Baila Mi Trujillana"—Juan Benites Reyes	—N/a
Pierina & Diego	40 (7, 9, 8, 8, 8)	Cabaret*	"Mein Herr" / "Don't Tell Mama"—Liza Minnelli	Sentenced
Conejo & Fabianne	46 (10, 7, 10, 10, 9)	Pop	"Beat it"—Michael Jackson	Safe
Belén & Gian Frank	47 (10, 8, 10, 9, 10)	Pop	"SexyBack"—Justin Timberlake	Best steps
Fernando & Whitney	44 (9, 9, 8, 9, 9)	Pop	"Loca"—Shakira	Safe
Pierina & Diego; Jesús & Cindy; Gisela & Rayder; Fernando & Whitney	2	Jazz (Team A)	"Candy Candy" / "Captain Future"—Memo Aguirre	
Karen & Edward; Rebeca & Licky; Belén & Gian Frank; Conejo & Fabianne	0	Jazz (Team B)	"3000 Leagues in Search of Mother" / "Force Five"—Memo Aguirre	
Pierina & Diego; Karen & Edward; Rebeca & Licky; Belén & Gian Frank; Jesús & Cindy; Gisela & Rayder; Conejo & Fabianne; Fernando & Whitney	2	Pachanga (The danceathon)	"Triciclo Perú"—Los Mojarras	

- Public's favorite couple: Karen & Edward (2 pts).

*The duel

- Rebeca & Licky: Eliminated
- Pierina & Diego: Safe

=== Week 3: Merengue ===
The couples danced merengue (except those sentenced), a team dance of festejo and a danceathon of salsa.

Running order

Couple	Scores	Dance	Music	Result
Conejo & Fabianne	39 (8, 8, 7, 8, 8)	Merengue	"La Morena"—Oro Solido	Sentenced
Gisela & Rayder	43 (8, 8, 9, 9, 9)	Merengue	"Rompecintura"—Los Hermanos Rosario	Safe
Pierina & Diego	45 (10, 8, 9, 10, 8)	Pop*	"Jump" / "4 Minutes"—Madonna	Sentenced
Jesús & Cindy	40 (8, 7, 7, 9, 9)	Jazz*	"(I've Had) The Time of My Life"—Bill Medley y Jennifer Warnes	—N/a
Belén & Gian Frank	46 (10, 9, 9, 9, 9)	Merengue	"La Dueña del Swing""—Los Hermanos Rosario	Safe
Fernando & Whitney	43 (9, 8, 8, 9, 9)	Merengue	"Kulikitaka"—Toño Rosario	Safe
Karen & Edward	46 (10, 8, 10, 9, 9)	Merengue	"Tu Papá y Tu Mamá"—Oro Solido	Best steps
Karen & Edward; Jesús & Cindy; Gisela & Rayder; Conejo & Fabianne	2	Festejo (Team A)	"Raíces del Festejo"—Eva Ayllón	
Pierina & Diego; Belén & Gian Frank; Fernando & Whitney	0	Festejo (Team B)	"Le Dije a Papá"—Eva Ayllón	
Pierina & Diego; Karen & Edward; Belén & Gian Frank; Jesús & Cindy; Gisela & Rayder; Conejo & Fabianne; Fernando & Whitney	1; 1	Salsa (The danceathon)	"Gozando en La Habana"—La Charanga Habanera	

- Public's favorite couple: Fernando & Whitney (2 pts).

*The duel

- Pierina & Diego: Safe
- Jesús & Cindy: Eliminated

=== Week 4: Aerodance/Disco ===
The couples danced aerodance, disco (except those sentenced) and a danceathon of danza de tijeras.

Running order

Couple	Scores	Dance	Music	Result
Gisela & Rayder	38 (8, 7, 8, 8, 7)	Aerodance	"Bon, Bon"—Pitbull	Sentenced
Gisela & Rayder	48 (9, 10, 10, 9, 10)	Disco	"Voulez-Vous"—ABBA	Sentenced
Karen & Edward	45 (10, 8, 10, 8, 9)	Aerodance	"A Little Respect"—Erasure	Best steps
Karen & Edward	43 (9, 8, 9, 8, 9)	Disco	"Never Can Say Goodbye"—Gloria Gaynor	Best steps
Belén & Gian Frank	40 (10, 6, 8, 7, 9)	Aerodance	"Tu Angelito"—Chino & Nacho	Safe
Belén & Gian Frank	48 (10, 8, 10, 10, 10)	Disco	"I Will Survive"—Gloria Gaynor	Safe
Fernando & Whitney	36 (7, 7, 8, 7, 7)	Aerodance	"Danza Kuduro"—Don Omar y Lucenzo	Sentenced
Fernando & Whitney	39 (8, 7, 8, 8, 8)	Disco	"Celebration"—Kool & the Gang	Sentenced
Conejo & Fabianne	43 (8, 9, 8, 9, 9)	Aerodance	"Rap das Armas"—Cidinho and Doca	Best steps
Conejo & Fabianne	48 (10, 9, 10, 9, 10)	Festejo*	"Jolgorio"—La Peña del Carajo	Best steps
Pierina & Diego	35 (8, 6, 8, 6, 7)	Aerodance	"This Time I Know It's for Real"—Donna Summer	—N/a
Pierina & Diego	42 (9, 8, 9, 8, 8)	Jazz*	"El Baile del Sapito"—Belinda	—N/a
Pierina & Diego; Karen & Edward; Belén & Gian Frank; Gisela & Rayder; Conejo & Fabianne; Fernando & Whitney	1; 1	Danza de tijeras (The danceathon)	"Carnaval"—La Sarita	

- Public's favorite couple: Karen & Edward (2 pts).

*The duel

- Conejo & Fabianne: Eliminated
- Pierina & Diego: Safe

=== Week 5: Quarterfinals ===
The couples danced trio lambada involving another celebrity (except those sentenced), Bollywood and a danceathon of cumbia.

Running order

Couple (Trio Dance Partner)	Scores	Dance	Music	Result
Fernando & Whitney (Brenda Carvalho)	35 (7, 7, 7, 6, 8)	Lambada	"Lambamor"—Kaoma	—N/a
Fernando & Whitney (Brenda Carvalho)	47 (10, 10, 9, 9, 9)	Rumba flamenca*	"Baila Me"—Gipsy Kings	—N/a
Conejo & Fabianne (Leslie Shaw)	45 (8, 10, 10, 8, 9)	Lambada	"Chorando Se Foi (Lambada)"—Kaoma	Sentenced
Conejo & Fabianne (Leslie Shaw)	39 (7, 8, 8, 8, 8)	Bollywood	"Haddipa"—Mika Singh	Sentenced
Karen & Edward (Adolfo Aguilar)	41 (8, 8, 8, 9, 8)	Lambada	"Dançando Lambada"—Kaoma	Sentenced
Karen & Edward (Adolfo Aguilar)	39 (8, 7, 8, 8, 8)	Bollywood	"Nach Baliye"—Jaspinder Narula	Sentenced
Gisela & Rayder (Christian Ysla)	41 (9, 8, 8, 8, 8)	Lambada	"El La Engañó"—Natusha	Safe
Gisela & Rayder (Christian Ysla)	46 (10, 8, 10, 9, 9)	Jazz*	"Gettin' Over You"—David Guetta & Chris Willis feat. Fergie y LMFAO	Safe
Belén & Gian Frank (Maricielo Effio)	44 (9, 9, 9, 9, 8)	Lambada	"Rumba Lambada"—Natusha	Best steps
Belén & Gian Frank (Maricielo Effio)	46 (9, 10, 10, 9, 8)	Bollywood	"Ishq Kamina"—Alka Yagnik & Sonu Nigam	Best steps
Karen & Edward; Belén & Gian Frank; Gisela & Rayder; Conejo & Fabianne; Fernando & Whitney	2	Cumbia (The danceathon)	"Ya Se Ha Muerto Mi Abuelo"—Juaneco y Su Combo	

- Public's favorite couple: Karen & Edward (2 pts).

*The duel

- Fernando & Whitney: Eliminated
- Gisela & Rayder: Safe

=== Week 6: Semifinals ===
The couples danced one unlearned ballroom dance, merengue house (except those sentenced), a team dance of pachanga and a danceathon of cumbia.

Running order

Couple	Scores	Dance	Music	Result
Belén & Gian Frank	46 (10, 9, 10, 9, 8)	Rumba	"Eres Todo en Mí"—Ana Gabriel	Best steps
Belén & Gian Frank	49 (10, 10, 10, 10, 9)	Merengue	"Fiesta Caliente"—Los Ilegales	Best steps
Gisela & Rayder	42 (8, 8, 9, 8, 9)	Paso doble	"El Gato Montés"—Manuel Penella Moreno	Sentenced
Gisela & Rayder	43 (8, 7, 10, 9, 9)	Merengue	"El Tiburón"—Proyecto Uno	Sentenced
Karen & Edward	47 (9, 9, 10, 10, 9)	Cha-cha-cha	"Sway"—The Pussycat Dolls	—N/a
Karen & Edward	44 (9, 9, 9, 8, 9)	Samba*	"Samba de carnaval"	—N/a
Conejo & Fabianne	41 (8, 7, 9, 8, 9)	Quickstep	"The Muppet Show Theme"—Jim Henson y Sam Pottle	Sentenced
Conejo & Fabianne	45 (10, 8, 9, 9, 9)	Salsa*	"Pedro Navaja"—Ruben Blades / "Indestructible"—Ray Barretto	Sentenced
Karen & Edward; Gisela & Rayder	1	Pachanga (Team A)	"Date la Vuelta Ahora"—Afrodisiaco	
Belén & Gian Frank; Conejo & Fabianne	1	Pachanga (Team B)	"La Gente Está Borracha"—Los Borgia	
Karen & Edward; Belén & Gian Frank; Gisela & Rayder; Conejo & Fabianne	2	Cumbia (The danceathon)	"Necesito un Amor" / "A Llorar a Otra Parte" / "Lárgate"—Hermanos Yaipén	

- Public's favorite couple: Belén & Gian Frank (2 pts).

*The duel

- Karen & Edward: Eliminated
- Conejo & Fabianne: Safe

=== Week 7: Finals ===
On the first part, the couples danced salsa and freestyle.

On the second part, the final two couples danced a mix (cumbia/latin pop/quebradita) and waltz.

Running order (Part 1)

Couple	Scores	Dance	Music	Result
Gisela & Rayder	39 (7, 8, 8, 8, 8)	Salsa	"Más Que un Amigo"—Tito Nieves	Third place
Gisela & Rayder	43 (7, 8, 9, 9, 10)	Freestyle	"Poker Face" / "Bad Romance" / "Telephone"—Lady Gaga	Third place
Conejo & Fabianne	43 (8, 9, 8, 9, 9)	Salsa	"Fabricando Fantasías"—Tito Nieves	Safe
Conejo & Fabianne	41 (8, 8, 8, 8, 9)	Freestyle	"Tusuy Kusun"—Damaris	Safe
Belén & Gian Frank	45 (10, 9, 9, 9, 8)	Salsa	"Sonámbulo"—Tito Nieves	—N/a
Belén & Gian Frank	48 (10, 10, 10, 10, 8)	Freestyle	"What's a Girl Gotta Do"—Basement Jaxx feat. Paloma Faith	—N/a

Running order (Part 2)

Couple	Scores	Dance	Music	Result
Conejo & Fabianne	44 (8, 9, 10, 8, 9)	Cumbia; Latin pop Quebradita	"La Escobita"—Marisol y La Magia del Norte "Dame Más"—Ricky Martin "La Niña Fresa"—Banda Zeta	Winners
Conejo & Fabianne	44 (9, 10, 9, 8, 8)	Waltz	"Sueña"—Luis Miguel	Winners
Belén & Gian Frank	46 (10, 9, 10, 9, 8)	Cumbia; Latin pop Quebradita	"Me Gusta"—Tommy Portugal "Arrasando"—Thalía "Palo Palito"—Banda Mazatlán	Runner up
Belén & Gian Frank	49 (10, 10, 10, 10, 9)	Waltz	"Keep Holding On"—Avril Lavigne	Runner up

== Dance chart ==
The celebrities and their dreamers will dance one of these routines for each corresponding week:

- Week 1: Jive, the danceathon & the versus (Jive)
- Week 2: Pop, team dances & the danceathon (The Pop Stars)
- Week 3: Merengue, team dances & the danceathon (Merengue)
- Week 4: Aerodance, disco & the danceathon (Aerodance/Disco)
- Week 5: Trio lambada, Bollywood & the danceathon (Quarterfinals)
- Week 6: One unlearned ballroom dance, merengue, team dances & the danceathon (Semifinals)
- Week 7: Salsa, freestyle, mix (cumbia/latin pop/quebradita) & waltz (Finals)

Couple	Week 1	Week 2	Week 3	Week 4		Week 5		Week 6		Week 7			
Conejo & Fabianne	Jive	Pop	Merengue	Aerodance	Festejo	Lambada	Bollywood	Quickstep	Salsa	Salsa	Freestyle	Mix	Waltz
Belen & Gian Frank	Jive	Pop	Merengue	Aerodance	Disco	Lambada	Bollywood	Rumba	Merengue	Salsa	Freestyle	Mix	Waltz
Gisela & Rayder	Jive	Pop	Merengue	Aerodance	Disco	Lambada	Jazz	Paso doble	Merengue	Salsa	Freestyle		
Karen & Edward	Jive	Pop	Merengue	Aerodance	Disco	Lambada	Bollywood	Cha-cha-cha	Samba				
Fernando & Whitney	Jive	Pop	Merengue	Aerodance	Disco	Lambada	Rumba flamenca						
Pierina & Diego	Jive	Cabaret	Pop	Aerodance	Jazz								
Jesús & Cindy	Jive	Pop	Jazz										
Rebecca & Licky	Jive	Marinera											

Modalities of competition
Couple	Week 1		Week 2		Week 3		Week 4	Week 5	Week 6	
El Conejo & Fabianne	Cumbia	Salsa	Jazz	Pachanga	Festejo	Salsa	Danza de tijeras	Cumbia	Pachanga	Cumbia
Belen & Gian Frank	Cumbia	Salsa	Jazz	Pachanga	Festejo	Salsa	Danza de tijeras	Cumbia	Pachanga	Cumbia
Gisela & Rayder	Cumbia	Salsa	Jazz	Pachanga	Festejo	Salsa	Danza de tijeras	Cumbia	Pachanga	Cumbia
Karen & Edward	Cumbia	Salsa	Jazz	Pachanga	Festejo	Salsa	Danza de tijeras	Cumbia	Pachanga	Cumbia
Fernando & Whitney	Cumbia	Salsa	Jazz	Pachanga	Festejo	Salsa	Danza de tijeras	Cumbia		
Pierina & Diego	Cumbia	Salsa	Jazz	Pachanga	Festejo	Salsa	Danza de tijeras			
Jesús & Cindy	Cumbia	Salsa	Jazz	Pachanga	Festejo	Salsa				
Rebecca & Licky	Cumbia	Salsa	Jazz	Pachanga						

Highest scoring dance
Lowest scoring dance
Gained bonus points for winning this dance
Gained no bonus points for losing this dance
In italic indicate the dances performed in the duel
