= El Gran Show season 4 =

El Gran Show
- Season 4
- Hosted by: Gisela Valcárcel; Aldo Díaz; Cristian Rivero
- Judges: Morella Petrozzi; Carlos Alcántara; Pachi Valle Riestra
- Celebrity winner: Raúl Zuazo
- Professional winner: Dayana Calla
- No. of episodes: 11

Release
- Original network: América Televisión
- Original release: May 14 – July 23, 2011

Season chronology
- ← Previous; Season 3 Next → Season 5

Season one of the 2011 edition of El Gran Show premiered on April 14, 2011.

This season, the "public's favorite couple" was not realized more in the program. In addition, the "lifeguard" was added, a special wildcard that the judges could use to save one of the eliminated couples.

On July 23, 2011, Raúl Zuazo and Dayana Calla were crowned champions, Leslie Shaw and Kevin Ubillus finished second, while Vanessa Terkes and Andy Sandoval finished third.

== Cast ==
=== Couples ===
The celebrities appeared at a press conference on May 2, 2011, this season featured only eight celebrities unlike past seasons.

In the first three weeks, the competition was between teams formed by two heroes and four dreamers with a respective choreographer, representing different regions of Peru. In each week, the team with the lowest score was sentenced and one of their dreamers was eliminated, determined by the individual vote of each of the team members. From the fourth week, each hero danced with only one dreamer of his team forming eight couples. Due to the drastic change, since of the remaining 14 dreamers six of them were eliminated, the production decided to call them for the next season.

Celebrity	Notability (known for)	Dreamer	Status
Carlos "Kukín" Flores	Former football player	Victoria Cordero	Eliminated 1st on June 11, 2011
Leysi Suárez	Actress & vedette	Eder Bocanegra	Eliminated 2nd on June 18, 2011
Mónica Hoyos	Actress & TV Host	Edson del Carpio	Eliminated 3rd on July 9, 2011
Mario Hart	Race car driver	Diana Burga	Eliminated 4th on July 23, 2011
Aldo Miyashiro	Actor, TV Host & screenwriter	Isabel Acevedo	Eliminated 5th on July 23, 2011
Vanessa Terkes	Actress	Andy Sandoval	Third place on July 23, 2011
Leslie Shaw	Singer, model & actress	Kevin Ubillus	Runner-up on July 23, 2011
Raúl Zuazo	Actor & film director	Dayana Calla	Winners on July 23, 2011

=== Host and judges ===
Gisela Valcárcel, Aldo Díaz and Cristian Rivero returned as hosts, while Morella Petrozzi, Carlos Alcántara, Pachi Valle Riestra and the VIP Jury returned as judges. Stuart Bishop, who served as a judge for the previous two seasons, did not return

== Scoring charts ==
Couple	Place	4	5	6	7	8	9	10	11	
Couple	Place	4	5	6	7	8	9	10	Top 5	Top 4
Raúl & Dayana	1	34	38	79	75	66	74	77	77	+40=117
Leslie & Kevin	2	31	31	71	78	73	73	75	77	+39=116
Vanessa & Andy	3	35	37	62	67	71	69	70	68	+34=102
Aldo & Isabel	4	30	30	58	68	57	70	62	68	+33=101
Mario & Diana	5	31	31	61	63	68	59	69	63	
Mónica & Edson	6	32	28	64	67	62	62			
Leysi & Eder	7	28	29	63						
Kukín & Victoria	8	29	31							

Red numbers indicate the sentenced for each week
Green numbers indicate the best steps for each week
the couple was eliminated that week
the couple was safe in the duel
the couple was eliminated that week and safe with a lifeguard
the winning couple
the runner-up couple
the third-place couple

=== Average score chart ===
This table only counts dances scored on a 40-point scale.

Rank by average	Place	Couple	Total points	Number of dances	Average
1	1	Raúl & Dayana	553	15	36.9
2	2	Leslie & Kevin	540	15	36.0
3	3	Vanessa & Andy	509	15	33.9
4	4	Aldo & Isabel	474	15	31.6
5	6	Mónica & Edson	315	10	31.5
6	5	Mario & Diana	439	14	31.3
7	7	Leysi & Eder	120	4	30.0
7	8	Kukín & Victoria	60	2	30.0

=== Highest and lowest scoring performances ===
The best and worst performances in each dance according to the judges' 40-point scale are as follows:

Dance	Highest scored dancer(s)	Highest score	Lowest scored dancer(s)	Lowest score
Salsa	Leslie Shaw	38	Mario Hart; Carlos "Kukín" Flores	29
Disco	Raúl Zuazo	34	Leysi Suárez	28
Guaracha	Raúl Zuazo	38	Leslie Shaw	32
Merengue	Mario Hart	31	Mónica Hoyos	28
Reggaeton	Aldo Miyashiro	36	Mario Hart	30
Mambo	Leysi Suárez	29	—	—
Cumbia	Raúl Zuazo	40	Aldo Miyashiro	29
Pop	Raúl Zuazo	39	Aldo Miyashiro	29
Latin pop	Aldo Miyashiro; Vanessa Terkes	36	Leysi Suárez; Mónica Hoyos	30
Pachanga	Raúl Zuazo	37	Vanessa Terkes	31
World dances	Leslie Shaw	40	Aldo Miyashiro	32
Hip-hop	Leslie Shaw	37	Aldo Miyashiro	28
Axé	Leslie Shaw; Vanessa Terkes	35	Aldo Miyashiro	29
Tex-mex	Raúl Zuazo; Leslie Shaw; Vanessa Terkes	35	Mario Hart	27
Strip dance	Raúl Zuazo	37	Mario Hart	30
Adagio	Raúl Zuazo	38	Aldo Miyashiro	30
Mix	Raúl Zuazo	39	Vanessa Terkes	31
Freestyle	Leslie Shaw	40	Mario Hart	33
Quickstep	Raúl Zuazo	40	Aldo Miyashiro	33

=== Couples' highest and lowest scoring dances ===
Scores are based upon a potential 40-point maximum.

Couples	Highest scoring dance(s)	Lowest scoring dance(s)
Raúl & Dayana	Cumbia & Quickstep (40)	Hip-hop (31)
Leslie & Kevin	Samba & Freestyle (40)	Disco (31)
Vanessa & Andy	Freestyle (37)	Cumbia (30)
Aldo & Isabel	Reggaetón, Latin pop & Freestyle (36)	Hip-hop (28)
Mario & Diana	Cumbia (35)	Tex-mex (27)
Mónica & Edson	Rumba flamenca (35)	Merengue (28)
Leysi & Eder	Pop (33)	Disco (28)
Kukín & Victoria	Reggaeton (31)	Salsa (29)

== Weekly scores ==
Individual judges' scores in the charts below (given in parentheses) are listed in this order from left to right: Morella Petrozzi, Carlos Alcántara, Pachi Valle Riestra, VIP Jury.

=== Week 1: First Dances ===
The teams danced jazz or reggaeton and a partner dance, formed by a hero and a dreamer, being the obtained scores added to the one of their respective teams.

Team Lima was sentenced, passing to the elimination vote and being eliminated the dreamer Alberto Arteaga.

Running order

Team	Scores	Dance	Music	Result
Trujillo	27 (6, 7, 6, 8)	Reggaeton	"I Know You Want Me (Calle Ocho)"—Pitbull	Safe
Lima	29 (7, 7, 7, 8)	Jazz	"Firework"—Katy Perry	Sentenced
Arequipa	32 (7, 8, 8, 9)	Reggaeton	"Danza Kuduro""—Don Omar feat. Lucenzo	Best steps
Callao	29 (5, 7, 8, 9)	Jazz	"Born This Way"—Lady Gaga	Safe
Couples
Vanessa & Andy (Lima)	19 (3, 5, 4, 7)	Salsa	"Aguanilé"—Pacho Hurtado	
Leslie & Kevin (Trujilo)	26 (6, 6, 5, 9)	Salsa	"Aguanilé"—Pacho Hurtado	
Leysi & Jhon (Callao)	22 (4, 5, 4, 9)	Cumbia	"Necesito Un Amor" / "Lárgate"—Hermanos Yaipén	
Raúl & Dayana (Arequipa)	26 (6, 6, 6, 8)	Cumbia	"Necesito Un Amor" / "Lárgate"—Hermanos Yaipén	

=== Week 2: Party Night ===
The teams performed one unlearned dance and a partner dance, formed by a hero and a dreamer,

Team Trujillo was sentenced, passing to the elimination vote and being eliminated the dreamer Wendy Gutiérrez.

Running order

Team	Scores	Dance	Music	Result
Callao	30 (7, 8, 7, 8)	Latin pop	"Addicted to You" / "Rabiosa"—Shakira	Best steps
Lima	28 (6, 7, 6, 9)	Disco	"Don't Stop 'Til You Get Enough"—Michael Jackson	Safe
Trujillo	30 (6, 8, 7, 9)	Lambada	"Taboo"—Don Omar	Sentenced
Arequipa	30 (6, 8, 8, 8)	Cabaret	"Show Me How You Burlesque"—Christina Aguilera	Best steps
Couples
Mario & Diana (Trujillo)	27 (6, 7, 6, 8)	Reggaeton	"Ella se arrebata"—Latin Fresh	
Mónica & Edson (Arequipa)	31 (7, 8, 7, 9)	Reggaeton	"Si No Le Contesto"—Plan B	
Kukín & Carmen (Callao)	31 (7, 9, 8, 7)	Reggaeton	"Métele sazón"—Tego Calderón	
Aldo & Isabel (Lima)	29 (7, 7, 6, 9)	Reggaeton	"Bla bla bla"—El Potro Álvarez feat. Chino & Nacho	

=== Week 3: Jazz & Merengue ===
The teams danced jazz and a partner dance, formed by a hero and a dreamer. In the versus, the heroes of each team faced each other in couples dancing pachanga.

Team Lima was sentenced, passing to the elimination vote and being eliminated the dreamer Gloria Cerdán, but the judges decided to save her with one of the lifeguards.

Running order

Team	Scores	Dance	Music	Result
Trujillo	31 (8, 7, 7, 9)	Jazz	"The Time (Dirty Bit)"—The Black Eyed Peas	Safe
Callao	33 (8, 9, 8, 8)	Jazz	"Toxic"—Britney Spears	Best steps
Lima	28 (6, 7, 6, 9)	Jazz	"Telephone"—Lady Gaga feat. Beyoncé	Sentenced
Arequipa	33 (7, 8, 8, 10)	Jazz	"On the Floor"—Jennifer Lopez feat. Pitbull	Safe
Couples
Raúl & Alejandra (Arequipa)	33 (8, 8, 8, 9)	Merengue	"Ya Llegó el Verano"—La Banda Chula	
Vanessa & Andy (Lima)	34 (8, 9, 8, 9)	Merengue	"El Kikikí"—Rikanera	
Leysi & Eder (Callao)	35 (9, 9, 9, 8)	Merengue	"Ice Cream"—Oro Solido	
Leslie & Sebastián (Trujillo)	34 (8, 9, 8, 9)	Merengue	"La Tanga"—Oro Solido	

The versus
Couple	Judges' votes	Dance	Music	Result
Mónica & Raúl (Arequipa)	Arequipa, Arequipa, Arequipa	Pachanga	"¿Cuando, Cuando Es?"—J King & Maximan	Winners (1 pt)
Aldo & Vanessa (Lima)	Arequipa, Arequipa, Arequipa	Pachanga	"¿Cuando, Cuando Es?"—J King & Maximan	Losers
Leslie & Mario (Trujillo)	Trujillo, Trujillo, Trujillo	Pachanga	"Lo Que No Sabes Tú"—Chino & Nacho feat. El Potro Álvarez y Baroni	Winners (1 pt)
Leysi & Kukín (Callao)	Trujillo, Trujillo, Trujillo	Pachanga	"Lo Que No Sabes Tú"—Chino & Nacho feat. El Potro Álvarez y Baroni	Losers

=== Week 4: Disco & Salsa ===
The couples danced disco or salsa. In the versus, they faced couples formed by the heroes dancing latin pop.

Running order

Couple	Scores	Dance	Music	Result
Mónica & Edson	32 (8, 8, 7, 9)	Salsa	"Temba, Tumba, Timba"—Los Van Van	Safe
Mario & Diana	29 (7, 7, 7, 8)	Salsa	"Juana Magdalena"—La Charanga Habanera	Safe
Vanessa & Andy	33 (8, 8, 8, 9)	Disco	"Boogie wonderland"—Earth, Wind & Fire	Best steps
Leysi & Eder	28 (7, 7, 6, 8)	Disco	"Disco Inferno"—The Trammps	Sentenced
Leslie & Kevin	31 (7, 8, 8, 8)	Disco	"On the Radio"—Donna Summer	Safe
Raúl & Dayana	34 (8, 9, 9, 8)	Disco	"Voulez-Vous"—ABBA	Safe
Aldo & Isabel	30 (7, 7, 7, 9)	Salsa	"Muévete"—La Charanga Habanera	Safe
Kukín & Victoria	29 (6, 7, 7, 9)	Salsa	"Gozando en La Habana"—La Charanga Habanera	Sentenced

The versus
Couple	Judges' votes	Dance	Music	Result
Vanessa & Mario	Vanessa & Mario, Vanessa & Mario, Vanessa & Mario	Latin pop	"Lo Hecho Está Hecho"—Shakira	Winners (2 pts)
Leslie & Aldo	Vanessa & Mario, Vanessa & Mario, Vanessa & Mario	Latin pop	"La Tortura"—Shakira feat. Alejandro Sanz	Losers
Raúl & Leysi	Vanessa & Mario, Vanessa & Mario, Vanessa & Mario	Latin pop	"Loba"—Shakira	Losers
Mónica & Kukín	Vanessa & Mario, Vanessa & Mario, Vanessa & Mario	Latin pop	"Loca"—Shakira feat. El Cata	Losers

=== Week 5: Guaracha & Merengue ===
The couples (except those sentenced) danced guaracha or merengue. In the versus, they faced couples formed by the heroes dancing rock and roll.

Running order

Couple	Scores	Dance	Music	Result
Leslie & Kevin	32 (7, 8, 9, 8)	Guaracha	"Burundanga"—La Sonora Matancera	Safe
Mónica & Edson	28 (7, 7, 6, 8)	Merengue	"Abusadora"—Wilfrido Vargas	Sentenced
Aldo & Isabel	30 (7, 7, 7, 9)	Merengue	"El Baile del Mono"—Wilfrido Vargas	Safe
Kukín & Victoria	31 (7, 7, 8, 9)	Reggaeton*	"Quitate Tu Pa Ponerme Yo"—Eddie Dee	—
Leysi & Eder	29 (7, 7, 7, 8)	Mambo*	"Lola's Mambo"—Juan Luis Guerra	Sentenced
Raúl & Dayana	38 (10, 9, 9, 10)	Guaracha	"Juancito Trucupey"—Alquimia la Sonora del XXI	Best steps
Vanessa & Andy	35 (8, 8, 9, 10)	Guaracha	"Caramelo a Kilo"—Alquimia la Sonora del XXI	Safe
Mario & Diana	31 (7, 7, 8, 9)	Merengue	"El Baile del Perrito"—Wilfrido Vargas	Safe

The versus
Couple	Judges' votes	Dance	Music	Result
Vanessa & Andy (Note: Vanessa Terkes dances with her dreamer Andy Sandoval, as Carlos "Kukín" Flores suffered an accident in full rehearsal, taking away the right to win the extra points.)	Vanessa & Andy, Leslie & Raúl, Vanessa & Andy	Rock and roll	"Long Tall Sally"—The Beatles	Winners (2 pts)
Leslie & Raúl	Vanessa & Andy, Leslie & Raúl, Vanessa & Andy	Rock and roll	"Rock Around the Clock"—Bill Haley	Losers
Mónica & Aldo	Vanessa & Andy, Leslie & Raúl, Vanessa & Andy	Rock and roll	"That's What I Like"—Jive Bunny and the Mastermixers	Losers
Leysi & Mario	Vanessa & Andy, Leslie & Raúl, Vanessa & Andy	Rock and roll	"Jailhouse Rock"—Elvis Presley	Losers

*The duel

- Kukín & Victoria: Eliminated
- Leysi & Eder: Safe

=== Week 6: Cumbia/Pop ===
Individual judges' scores in the charts below (given in parentheses) are listed in this order from left to right: Morella Petrozzi, Carlos Alcántara, Vania Masías, VIP Jury.

The couples danced cumbia (except those sentenced), pop and a danceathon of salsa.

Running order

Couple	Scores	Dance	Music	Result
Mario & Diana	32 (8, 8, 8, 8)	Cumbia	"Me Gusta"—Tommy Portugal y La Pasión	Sentenced
Mario & Diana	29 (7, 7, 7, 8)	Pop	"Torero"—Chayanne	Sentenced
Leslie & Kevin	35 (8, 9, 9, 9)	Cumbia	"La Caderona"—Los Villacorta	Safe
Leslie & Kevin	34 (9, 8, 8, 9)	Pop	"Poker Face"—Lady Gaga	Safe
Vanessa & Andy	30 (7, 7, 7, 9)	Cumbia	"Amor de Mis Amores"—Marisol y La Magia del Norte	Safe
Vanessa & Andy	32 (7, 8, 7, 10)	Pop	"Single Ladies (Put a Ring on It)"—Beyoncé	Safe
Leysi & Eder	30 (8, 7, 7, 8)	Latin pop*	"Mujer Latina"—Thalía	—
Leysi & Eder	33 (8, 9, 8, 8)	Pop	"Ojos Así"—Shakira	—
Mónica & Edson	31 (8, 7, 7, 9)	Salsa*	"Valió la Pena"—Marc Anthony	Safe
Mónica & Edson	33 (8, 8, 8, 9)	Pop	"Let's Get Loud"—Jennifer Lopez	Safe
Raúl & Dayana	40 (10, 10, 10, 10)	Cumbia	"Tu Hipocresía"—Grupo 5	Best steps
Raúl & Dayana	39 (10, 10, 9, 10)	Pop	"Livin' la Vida Loca"—Ricky Martin	Best steps
Aldo & Isabel	29 (6, 7, 7, 9)	Cumbia	"Canalla"—Marisol y La Magia del Norte	Sentenced
Aldo & Isabel	29 (6, 7, 7, 9)	Pop	"Locovox"—Locomía	Sentenced
Mario & Diana; Mónica & Edson; Aldo & Isabel; Leslie & Kevin; Leysi & Eder; Vanessa & Andy; Raúl & Dayana	2	Salsa (The danceathon)	"Arrepentida"—Los Adolescent's	

*The duel

- Leysi & Eder: Eliminated
- Mónica & Edson: Safe

=== Week 7: Pachanga/World Dances ===
The couples danced pachanga (except those sentenced), the world dances and a danceathon of cumbia.

Running order

Couple	Scores	Dance	Music	Result
Vanessa & Andy	31 (7, 8, 7, 9)	Pachanga	"Que es Lo Que Quiere Esa Nena"—El General	Sentenced
Vanessa & Andy	36 (9, 9, 8, 10)	(Saudi Arabia) Belly dance	"Sidi Mansour"—Saber Rebaï	Sentenced
Mónica & Edson	32 (8, 8, 8, 8)	Pachanga	"El Tiburón"—Proyecto Uno	Safe
Mónica & Edson	35 (9, 9, 9, 8)	(Spain) Rumba flamenca	"Baila Me"—Gipsy Kings	Safe
Leslie & Kevin	36 (10, 9, 8, 9)	Pachanga	"Levantando las Manos"—El Símbolo	Best steps
Leslie & Kevin	40 (10, 10, 10, 10)	(Brazil) Samba	"Hip Hip Chin Chin"—Club des Belugas / "Magalenha"—Sérgio Mendes	Best steps
Mario & Diana	30 (7, 7, 7, 9)	Reggaetón*	"Bon, Bon"—Pitbull	Sentenced
Mario & Diana	33 (8, 8, 8, 9)	(United States) Country	"Old Pop in an Oak"—Rednex	Sentenced
Aldo & Isabel	36 (9, 9, 8, 10)	Reggaetón*	"El Conejito"—Joan & Oneill	Safe
Aldo & Isabel	32 (7, 8, 7, 10)	(India) Bollywood	"Ishq Kamina"—Alka Yagnik y Sonu Niigaam	Safe
Raúl & Dayana	37 (9, 9, 9, 10)	Pachanga	"Taqui Taqui"—Ilegales	Safe
Raúl & Dayana	38 (9, 10, 9, 10)	(Argentina) Tango	"El Choclo"—Ángel Villoldo	Safe
Mario & Diana; Mónica & Edson; Aldo & Isabel; Leslie & Kevin; Vanessa & Andy; Raúl & Dayana	2	Cumbia (The danceathon)	"Ven a Bailar"—Ruth Karina	

*The duel

- Mario & Diana: Eliminated (but safe with the lifeguard)
- Aldo & Isabel: Safe

=== Week 8: Hip-Hop/Axé Under the Rain ===
Individual judges' scores in the charts below (given in parentheses) are listed in this order from left to right: Morella Petrozzi, Carlos Alcántara, Pachi Valle Riestra, VIP Jury.

The couples danced hip-hop (except those sentenced), axé under the rain and a danceathon of cumbia.

Running order

Couple	Scores	Dance	Music	Result
Leslie & Kevin	37 (10, 9, 9, 9)	Hip-hop	"Pump It"—The Black Eyed Peas	Best steps
Leslie & Kevin	35 (9, 9, 8, 9)	Axé	"Ou Da Ou Desce"—Exporto Brasil	Best steps
Raúl & Dayana	31 (8, 7, 7, 9)	Hip-hop	"Hotel Room Service"—Pitbull	Safe
Raúl & Dayana	34 (8, 9, 8, 9)	Axé	"Dança Do Vampiro"—Axé Bahia	Safe
Aldo & Isabel	28 (7, 7, 6, 8)	Hip-hop	"Gettin' Over You"—David Guetta & Chris Willis feat. Fergie & LMFAO	Sentenced
Aldo & Isabel	29 (6, 7, 7, 9)	Axé	"Maomeno"—Axé Bahía	Sentenced
Vanessa & Andy	36 (9, 9, 8, 10)	Pop*	"Buttons"—The Pussycat Dolls feat. Snoop Dogg / "3"—Britney Spears	Safe
Vanessa & Andy	35 (9, 9, 8, 9)	Axé	"Dança Da Maozinha"—Axé Bahía	Safe
Mario & Diana	35 (9, 9, 8, 9)	Cumbia*	"Lady Bi" / "La Pituca"—Tongo	Safe
Mario & Diana	33 (9, 8, 7, 9)	Axé	"Beso en la Boca"—Axé Bahía	Safe
Mónica & Edson	32 (8, 8, 8, 8)	Hip-hop	"I Gotta Feeling"—The Black Eyed Peas	Sentenced
Mónica & Edson	30 (7, 8, 7, 8)	Axé	"Dança Da Manivela"—Axé Bahía	Sentenced
Mario & Diana; Mónica & Edson; Aldo & Isabel; Leslie & Kevin; Vanessa & Andy; Raúl & Dayana	1 1 1	Cumbia (The danceathon)	"Ojitos Hechiceros" / "Pecadora" / "El Arbolito"—Deyvis Orozco y el Grupo Néctar	

*The duel

- Vanessa & Andy: Eliminated (but safe with the lifeguard)
- Mario & Diana: Safe

=== Week 9: Quarterfinals ===
The couples danced tex-mex (except those sentenced), strip dance under the rain, a team dance of jazz and a danceathon of merengue.

Running order

Couple	Scores	Dance	Music	Result
Mario & Diana	27 (6, 7, 6, 8)	Tex-mex	"No Tengo Dinero"—Kumbia Kings feat. Juan Gabriel y El Gran Silencio	Sentenced
Mario & Diana	30 (7, 8, 7, 8)	Strip dance	"American Woman"—Lenny Kravitz	Sentenced
Raúl & Dayana	35 (9, 9, 8, 9)	Tex-mex	"El Chico del Apartamento 512"—Selena	Best steps
Raúl & Dayana	37 (9, 10, 8, 10)	Strip dance	"Pink"—Aerosmith	Best steps
Leslie & Kevin	35 (8, 9, 9, 9)	Tex-mex	"Baila Esta Cumbia" / "Bidi Bidi Bom Bom"—Selena	Safe
Leslie & Kevin	36 (9, 10, 8, 9)	Strip dance	"Don't Cry"—Guns N' Roses	Safe
Mónica & Edson	30 (8, 7, 7, 8)	Latin pop*	"(I Can't Get No) Satisfaction" / "Caramelo"—Monique Pardo	—
Mónica & Edson	32 (8, 7, 8, 9)	Strip dance	"Crazy"—Aerosmith	—
Aldo & Isabel	36 (9, 9, 8, 10)	Latin pop*	"Todos Me Miran"—Gloria Trevi	Safe
Aldo & Isabel	32 (7, 8, 7, 10)	Strip dance	"Sweet Dreams (Are Made of This)"—Eurythmics	Safe
Vanessa & Andy	35 (8, 9, 9, 9)	Tex-mex	"Techno Cumbia"—Selena	Sentenced
Vanessa & Andy	34 (9, 8, 8, 9)	Strip dance	"I Love Rock 'N Roll"—Joan Jett and the Blackhearts	Sentenced
Mónica & Edson; Leslie & Kevin; Vanessa & Andy	0	Jazz (Team A)	"Billie Jean" / "Thriller"—Michael Jackson	
Mario & Diana; Aldo & Isabel; Raúl & Dayana	2	Jazz (Team B)	"Bad" / "Beat It"—Michael Jackson	
Mario & Diana; Mónica & Edson; Aldo & Isabel; Leslie & Kevin; Vanessa & Andy; Raúl & Dayana	2	Merengue (The danceathon)	"La Ciguapa"—Jandy Feliz	

*The duel

- Mónica & Edson: Eliminated
- Aldo & Isabel: Safe

=== Week 10: Semifinals ===
Individual judges' scores in the chart below (given in parentheses) are listed in this order from left to right: Morella Petrozzi, Johanna San Miguel, Pachi Valle Riestra, VIP Jury.

The couples danced salsa (except those sentenced), adagio, a team dance of marinera and a danceathon of pachanga.

Due to a failure in the telephone calls, it was decided that the duel was canceled and the sentenced couples saved.

Running order

Couple	Scores	Dance	Music	Result
Raúl & Dayana	35 (9, 8, 8, 10)	Salsa	"La Rebelión"—Joe Arroyo	Best steps
Raúl & Dayana	38 (9, 10, 9, 10)	Adagio	"I Don't Want to Miss a Thing"—Aerosmith	Best steps
Aldo & Isabel	32 (7, 8, 7, 10)	Salsa	"Bam Bam"—Joe Arroyo	Sentenced
Aldo & Isabel	30 (7, 7, 6, 10)	Adagio	"My Heart Will Go On"—Celine Dion	Sentenced
Mario & Diana	33 (8, 9, 7, 9)	Reggaeton*	"Conteo"—Don Omar / "El Ritmo No Perdona (Prende)"—Daddy Yankee	Sentenced
Mario & Diana	34 (8, 10, 7, 9)	Adagio	"I Will Always Love You"—Whitney Houston	Sentenced
Vanessa & Andy	36 (10, 8, 8, 10)	Latin pop*	"Mírala, Míralo" / "Reina de Corazones"—Alejandra Guzmán	Safe
Vanessa & Andy	34 (9, 7, 8, 10)	Adagio	"Take My Breath Away"—Jessica Simpson	Safe
Leslie & Kevin	38 (10, 10, 9, 9)	Salsa	"Quimbara"—Celia Cruz	Safe
Leslie & Kevin	35 (10, 8, 7, 10)	Adagio	"Total Eclipse of the Heart"—Bonnie Tyler	Safe
Mario & Diana; Leslie & Kevin; Raúl & Dayana	2	Marinera (Grupo A)	"La Concheperla"—Banda de la PNP	
Aldo & Isabel; Vanessa & Andy	0	Marinera (Grupo B)	"Sacachispa"—Banda de la PNP	
Mario & Diana; Aldo & Isabel; Leslie & Kevin; Vanessa & Andy; Raúl & Dayana	2	Pachanga (The danceathon)	"Muchacho Provinciano"—Los Mojarras	

=== Week 11: Finals ===
Individual judges' scores in the charts below (given in parentheses) are listed in this order from left to right: Morella Petrozzi, Carlos Alcántara, Pachi Valle Riestra, VIP Jury.

On the first part, the couples danced a mix (mambo/latin pop/quebradita) (except those sentenced) and a freestyle.

On the second part, the final four couples danced quickstep.

Running order (Part 1)

Couple	Scores	Dance	Music	Result
Mario & Diana	30 (7, 7, 7, 9)	Cumbia	"Cariñito"—La Sarita	Eliminated
Mario & Diana	33 (8, 8, 8, 9)	Freestyle	"Pégate"—Ricky Martin	Eliminated
Aldo & Isabel	32 (7, 8, 7, 10)	Cumbia	"Carnaval"—La Sarita	Safe
Aldo & Isabel	36 (9, 9, 8, 10)	Freestyle	"Rakatá"—Wisin & Yandel / "Limpia Parabrisas"—Daddy Yankee	Safe
Vanessa & Andy	31 (8, 7, 7, 9)	Mambo; Latin pop Quebradita	"Que le Pasa a Lupita"—Pérez Prado "Oye!"—Gloria Estefan "Palo palito"—Banda Z	—
Vanessa & Andy	37 (9, 9, 9, 10)	Freestyle	"Tu Veneno"—Natalia Oreiro	—
Raúl & Dayana	39 (10, 10, 9, 10)	Mambo; Latin pop Quebradita	"Mambo No. 8"—Pérez Prado "Arrasando"—Thalía "La Niña Fresa"—Banda Z	—
Raúl & Dayana	38 (9, 9, 10, 10)	Freestyle	"Flashdance... What a Feeling" / "Fame"—Irene Cara	—
Leslie & Kevin	37 (9, 9, 9, 10)	Mambo; Latin pop Quebradita	"Que Rico Mambo"—Pérez Prado "Bom, Bom"—Chayanne "La Quebradora"—Banda el Recodo	—
Leslie & Kevin	40 (10, 10, 10, 10)	Freestyle	"All That Jazz" / "Cell Block Tango"—from Chicago	—

Running order (Part 2)

Couple	Scores	Dance	Music	Result
Vanessa & Andy	34 (8, 9, 8, 9)	Quickstep	"Hey Pachuco"—Royal Crown Revue	Third place
Raúl & Dayana	40 (10, 10, 10, 10)	Quickstep	"Life Goes to a Party"—Harry James	Winners
Leslie & Kevin	39 (9, 10, 10, 10)	Quickstep	"Sing, Sing, Sing (With a Swing)"—Benny Goodman	Runner up
Aldo & Isabel	33 (8, 8, 8, 9)	Quickstep	"The Muppet Show Theme"—Jim Henson & Sam Pottle	Eliminated

== Dance chart ==
The celebrities and their dreamers will dance one of these routines for each corresponding week:

- Week 1, 2 & 3: Teams stage
- Week 4: Disco, salsa & the versus (Disco & Timba)
- Week 5: Guaracha, merengue & the versus (Guaracha & Merengue)
- Week 6: Cumbia, pop & the danceathon (Cumbia/Pop)
- Week 7: Pachanga, one unlearned dance & the danceathon (Pachanga/World Dances)
- Week 8: Hip-Hop, axé under the rain & the danceathon (Hip-Hop/Axé Under the Rain)
- Week 9: Tex-mex, strip dance under the rain, team dances & the danceathon (Quarterfinals)
- Week 10: Salsa, adagio, team dances & the danceathon (Semifinals)
- Week 11: Mix (mambo/latin pop/quebradita), freestyle, quickstep (Finals)

Couple	Week 4	Week 5	Week 6		Week 7		Week 8		Week 9		Week 10		Week 11		
Raúl & Dayana	Disco	Guaracha	Cumbia	Pop	Pachanga	Tango	Hip-Hop	Axé	Tex-mex	Strip dance	Salsa	Adagio	Mix	Freestyle	Quickstep
Leslie & Kevin	Disco	Guaracha	Cumbia	Pop	Pachanga	Samba	Hip-Hop	Axé	Tex-mex	Strip dance	Salsa	Adagio	Mix	Freestyle	Quickstep
Vanessa & Andy	Disco	Guaracha	Cumbia	Pop	Pachanga	Belly dance	Pop	Axé	Tex-mex	Strip dance	Latin pop	Adagio	Mix	Freestyle	Quickstep
Aldo & Isabel	Salsa	Merengue	Cumbia	Pop	Reggaeton	Bollywood	Hip-hop	Axé	Latin pop	Strip dance	Salsa	Adagio	Cumbia	Freestyle	Quickstep
Mario & Diana	Salsa	Merengue	Cumbia	Pop	Reggaetón	Country	Cumbia	Axé	Tex-mex	Strip dance	Reggaeton	Adagio	Cumbia	Freestyle	
Mónica & Edson	Salsa	Merengue	Salsa	Pop	Pachanga	Rumba flamenca	Hip-hop	Axé	Latin pop	Strip dance					
Leysi & Eder	Disco	Mambo	Latin pop	Pop											
Kukín & Victoria	Salsa	Reggaetón													

Modalities of competition
Couple	Week 4	Week 5	Week 6	Week 7	Week 8	Week 9		Week 10	
Raúl & Dayana	Latin pop	Rock and Roll	Salsa	Cumbia	Cumbia	Jazz	Merengue	Marinera	Pachanga
Leslie & Kevin	Latin pop	Rock and roll	Salsa	Cumbia	Cumbia	Jazz	Merengue	Marinera	Pachanga
Vanessa & Andy	Latin pop	Rock and roll	Salsa	Cumbia	Cumbia	Jazz	Merengue	Marinera	Pachanga
Aldo & Isabel	Latin pop	Rock and roll	Salsa	Cumbia	Cumbia	Jazz	Merengue	Marinera	Pachanga
Mario & Diana	Latin pop	Rock and roll	Salsa	Cumbia	Cumbia	Jazz	Merengue	Marinera	Pachanga
Mónica & Edson	Latin pop	Rock and roll	Salsa	Cumbia	Cumbia	Jazz	Merengue		
Leysi & Eder	Latin pop	Rock and roll	Salsa						
Kukín & Victoria	Latin pop	Rock and roll							

Highest scoring dance
Lowest scoring dance
Gained bonus points for winning this dance
Gained no bonus points for losing this dance
In italic indicate the dances performed in the duel
