= Mi vida sin ti =

- Genre: Telenovela
- Created by: Eduardo Adrianzén
- Written by: Eduardo Adrianzén; Rogger Vergara; Jimena Ortiz de Zevallos; Luis Francisco Palomino
- Directed by: Ani Alva Helfer; Michelle Alexander
- Starring: Pierina Carcelén; David Villanueva; Karime Scander; Andrés Vilchez
- Composer: Juan Carlos Fernández
- Country of origin: Peru
- Original language: Spanish
- No. of seasons: 1
- No. of episodes: 40

Production
- Executive producer: Ivanna de la Piedra
- Producers: Adriana Álvarez; Francisco Álvarez; Hugo Coya; Michelle Alexander
- Cinematography: Guillermo de la Flor; Warren Lévano; Celso Elías
- Camera setup: Multi-camera
- Production company: Del Barrio Producciones

Original release
- Network: América Televisión
- Release: 5 October – 30 November 2020

Mi vida sin ti is a Peruvian telenovela created by Eduardo Adrianzén. It aired on América Televisión from 5 October 2020 to 30 November 2020. The series stars Pierina Carcelén, David Villanueva, Karime Scander and Andrés Vilchez.

== Premise ==
Santiago and Amanda love each other deeply, but life separates them and each goes their separate ways to start their own families. Eventually, fate will bring them back together. This unexpected reunion turns into an emotional journey filled with fear, guilt, and hidden secrets, as well as situations that prove overwhelming for the rest of their families.

== Cast ==
- Pierina Carcelén as Amanda Castillo de Calderón
  - Vania Accinelli as young Amanda
- David Villanueva as Santiago Vargas
  - Mario Cortijo as young Santiago
- Sebastián Monteghirfo as Enrique Calderón
- Vanessa Saba as Leticia Bredeston Div de Vargas
- Diego Pérez as Enrique Calderón Castillo "Kike"
- Karime Scander as Camila Calderón Castillo
- Marisol Aguirre as Vilma Traverso de Gubbins «Viruca»
- Emilram Cossío as Pericles Infante
- Cielo Torres as Xiomara Zamora de Infante
- Andrés Vílchez as Daniel Vargas Bredeston
- Daniela Rodriguez Aranda as Jossy
- Daniela Feijoó as Olenka Dávalos
- Claret Quea as Eddie Navarro «Grillo»
- Ítalo Maldonado as Claudio Francisco Mendoza
- Gabriela Billotti as Elvira de Vargas
- Miguel Álvarez as Marcelo Miguel
- Jimena Lindo as Karina Vargas
- Briana Botto as Rocío del Carmen
- Andrea Chuiman as Floribel Díaz

== Reception ==
The telenovela premiered on 5 October 2020 with a percentage rating of 18 points, becoming the most watched program in its timeslot. The final episode, aired on 30 November 2020, was the most watched program in primetime, with a percentage rating of 19.4 points.
