= Belén Estévez =

Argentine dancer and vedette (born 1984)

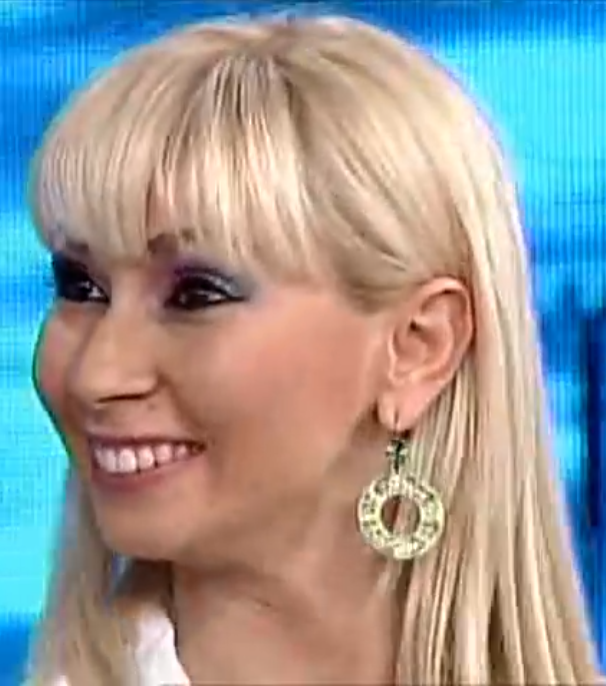
- On El Gran Show 2011: Reyes del Show
- Born: María Belén Luján Carreño; 25 September 1984 (age 41); Buenos Aires
- Occupations: Dancer, vedette

Belén Estévez (born 25 September 1984) is an Argentinian dancer and vedette who began her career in Peru. She is known for winning El Gran Show in 2010 and 2011.

== Reality shows ==
- 2010: El Gran Show (season 2) – winner
- 2010: El Gran Show: Reyes del Show – 2nd place
- 2011: El Gran Show 2011 (season 2) – 2nd place
- 2011: El Gran Show 2011: Reyes del Show – winner
- 2012: El Gran Show – coach
