= Jesús Neyra =

Peruvian actor and dancer (born 1990)

- Born: Jesús Adalberto Neyra Magagna; June 30, 1990 (age 36); Lima, Peru
- Occupations: Actor, model, dancer, and former football player
- Years active: 2006–present

Jesús Adalberto Neyra Magagna is a Peruvian actor, model, dancer, and former football player best known for being a "Hero" in the first and third seasons of El Gran Show.

He is Gianella Neyra's brother. He has studied acting with Michelle Danner in Los Angeles.

== Filmography ==
List of television credits as an actor
Year	Title	Role	Notes
2008	Graffiti	Alfonso Silva "Cachorro"	Lead role
2010	Eva	Luis Roldán	
2011	La Perricholi	Diego Miguel Bravo de Rivera	
2011—2012	La bodeguita	Marcelo de la Vega	Lead role
2013	Grachi	Manú	Season 3
2013	Avenida Perú	Sebastián Neuhaus / Mateo	
2025	Luz de luna	Professor Rodolfo Pacora	Season 4
2026	Señora del destino	Reynaldo Pérez López	

List of television credits as himself
Year	Title	Role	Notes
2010	El gran show	Contestant	Runner-up
2010	El gran show: reyes del show	Contestant	7º place
2011	El gran show	Contestant	Winner
2011	El gran show: reyes del show	Contestant	3° place
2010	Pequeños gigantes (Perú)	Judge	
2010	Kids Choice Awards México	Special appearance	

== Theatre ==
- A pie, descalzos ¡vamos! (2009) as San Francisco de Asís (Saint Francis of Assisi).
- La zapatilla encantada (2010) as El príncipe.
- Las tremendas aventuras de la Capitana Gazpacho (2010) as Pompeyo.
- West Side Story (2011) as Bernardo Nunez.
- Hairspray (2012) as Link Larkin.
- Romeo y Julieta (2013) as Mercucio.
