= Rebeca Escribens =

Peruvian actress (born 1977)

- Born: Rebeca Emilia Escribens; June 11, 1977 (age 49); Lima, Peru
- Occupation: Actress/Television personality/ Host
- Years active: 1992–present
- Height: 1.75 cm (1 in)

Rebeca Escribens is a Peruvian actress, TV Host., radio host and producer.

== Filmography ==
=== Television ===
- María Rosa, búscame una esposa (2000) as Yolanda García
- Latin Lover (2001) as Silvana
- Luciana y Nicolás (2003) Host
- ¡Despierta América! (2004) Host
- Gente Dmente (2004). Host
- "Superestar Renovado" (2005) Host
- Camino a la Fama (2005) Host
- Bailando con las Estrellas (2005–2006) Host
- Nunca te diré adiós (2005)
- Desde la butaca (2006)
- Pobre millonaria (2007)
- Los Barriga (2008) as Isabela Luján (villana) .
- Que vivan las mujeres (2009) Host
- El Gran Show: Season 2 - Heroine 7th Place
- El Gran Show: Reyes del Show - Heroine

=== Theater ===
- Evita (2005)

=== Cinema ===
- Ladies Room (2003)
- Talk Show (2006)
- La búsqueda del diente mágico (voz) (2009)
