= Pierina Carcelén =

Peruvian actress, model and dancer

- Born: Pierina Carcelén Jerí; February 24, 1979 (age 47); Lima, Peru
- Occupations: Actress, Model, Dancer
- Years active: 2004–present
- Modeling information
- Height: 1.70 m (5 ft 7 in)

Pierina Carcelén Jerí is a Peruvian actress, model and dancer.

== Filmography ==
=== Teleseries ===
Year	Name	Role	Relevance
2026	Valentina valiente	Elsa Cecilia Cruz Morante	Cast
2025–26	Eres mi bien	Claudia Martínez Bustamante	Cast
2020–21	Dos hermanas	Ximena Berrospi Ballón	Cast
2012–13	La reina de las carretillas	Estrella	Lead role
2011–12	Gamarra	Paulina	Cast
2011	Yo no me llamo Natacha	Violeta	Co-star
2010	Matadoras	Leonora Podestá	Villain
2009	Al Fondo Hay Sitio	Liliana Morales	Cast
2005–06	Así es la vida	Ángela Montes de Oca	Support

=== Theater ===
Year	Name	Role	Relevance
2012	Madrugada	Various roles	
2011	“Anabella y Zina”	Zina	Also producer
2011	“La Doble Inconstancia”	Lisette	

=== Reality shows ===
Year	Name	Place
2010	El Gran Show: Reyes del Show	Sixth Place
2010	El Gran Show".	Seventh Place
2010	Habacilar: Amigos y rivales	Fourth Place

=== Movies ===
Year	Name	Role	Relevance
2010	'Endhiran' (The Robot)	Dancer	(uncredited)
