= Miguel Rebosio =

Peruvian footballer (born 1976)

Personal information
- Full name: César Miguel Rebosio Compans
- Date of birth: 20 October 1976 (age 50)
- Place of birth: Lima, Peru
- Height: 1.73 m (5 ft 8 in)
- Position: Defender

Youth career
- 1985: Sporting Cristal
- 1986–: Cantolao
- Sporting Cristal

Senior career*
Years	Team	Apps	(Gls)
1995–1996	Guardia Republicana		
1996–2000	Sporting Cristal	128	(2)
2001–2004	Zaragoza	93	(1)
2004–2005	Almería	18	(1)
2005	Alianza Lima	13	(0)
2006	Sport Boys	8	(0)
2006	PAOK	3	(0)
2007	Sporting Cristal	4	(1)
2008	U. César Vallejo	25	(1)
2009	Sport Boys	6	(0)
Total		298	(6)

International career
1997–2005	Peru	60	(0)
- * Club domestic league appearances and goals

César Miguel Rebosio Compans (born 20 October 1976) is a Peruvian former footballer who played as a defender.

== Club career ==
Rebosio played for five different teams in his country (namely twice for Sporting Cristal and Sport Boys), and also had abroad stints with Greece's PAOK (only three matches) and Real Zaragoza and UD Almería in Spain.

With the Aragonese, he was regularly used during his three 1/2 years, helping the side to the 2003–04 Copa del Rey, one year after promoting to La Liga. He finished his spell in the country also in the second division, with UD Almería.

== International career ==
Rebosio was a member of the national team, and played 60 matches since his debut on 12 June 1997, featuring in three Copa América tournaments.

== Honours ==
Guardia Republicana

- 1995 Segunda División Peruana

Sporting Cristal

- 1996 Torneo Descentralizado
- Copa Libertadores runner-up: 1997

Real Zaragoza

- 2000-01 Copa del Rey
- 2003-04 Copa del Rey

Sport Boys

- 2009 Peruvian Segunda División
