= Latin Fresh =

- Birth name: Roberto de los Rios Reyes
- Born: 15 March 1975 (age 50); Panama
- Genres: reggaeton
- Occupation: rapper
- Labels: Universal Music Group

Latin Fresh, real name Roberto de los Rios Reyes, is a Panamanian reggaeton and reggae en Español artist. He scored national hits in 1995, and toured central and South America in 1997. He completed a three-record contract for Sony Music, later signing with Machete Records, a subsidiary of Universal Music Group, with which he released Plan Calle in 2006, an attempt to break into the U.S. market.
