= Merengue (dance) =

Style of Dominican dance

The Merengue
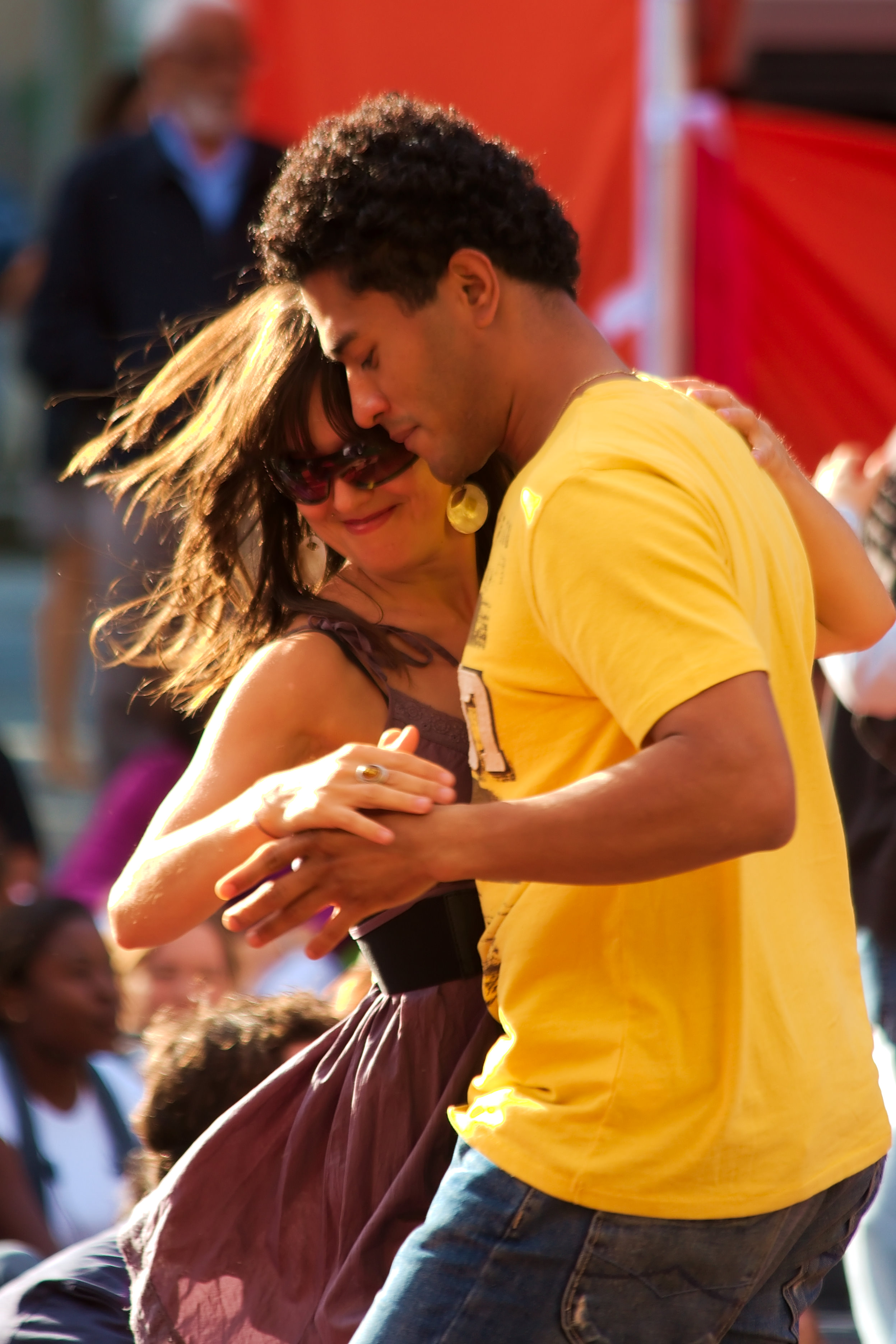
- Genre: Caribbean dance
- Time signature: 4/4
- Origin: Dominican Republic

Merengue (/məˈrɛŋɡeɪ/, Spanish: [meˈɾeŋɡe]) is a style of Dominican music and dance. Merengue is the national dance of the Dominican Republic and is also important to national identity in the country. It is a type of danced walk and is accessible to a large variety of people with or without dance experience. The music of merengue draws influence from European and Afro-Cuban styles and mainly uses instruments like guitars, drums, and a charrasca or metal scraper. The dance originated as a rural dance and later became a ballroom dance. Merengue has three distinct sections: the paseo, the merengue proper, and the closing jaleo which includes improvisation.

Partners hold each other in a closed position. The leader holds the follower's waist with their right hand and the follower's right hand with their left hand at the follower's eye level. Partners bend their knees slightly left and right, thus making the hips move left and right. The hips of the leader and follower move in the same direction throughout the song. The rhythm of these steps often accentuates either the right or left step. This pattern is often known as a ‘danced walk’. During this dance, a dancer will mostly put their weight on the same foot. Partners may walk sideways or circle each other, in small steps. They can switch to an open position and do separate turns without letting go of each other's hands or by releasing one hand. During these turns, they may twist their handhold into intricate pretzels. Other choreographies are also possible.

Although the tempo of the music may be frenetic, the upper body is kept steady and turns are slow, typically four beats/steps per complete turn.

In the social dancing of the United States the "empalizada" style is replaced by exaggerated Cuban motion, taught in chain ballroom studios for dances of Latin American origin (cha-cha-cha, rumba, mambo, salsa).

== History ==
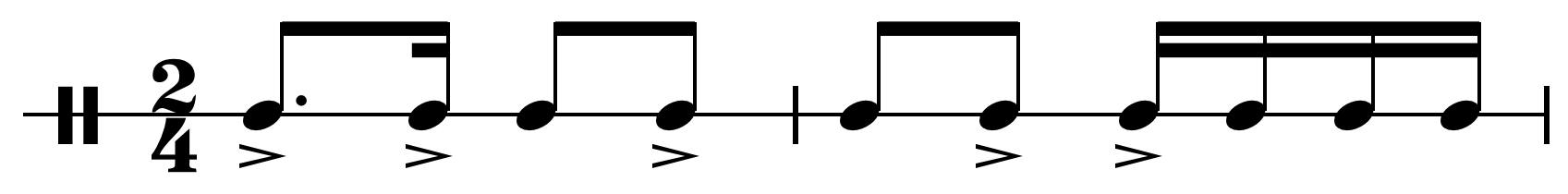
Merengue rhythm.

Merengue is often done with less space between partners and different hip movements.

According to Ramiro Burr, merengue was originally performed with acoustic groups. During the 20th century, merengue's original lead instrument was the guitar. By the 1940s and 1950s it was performed with accordions. This form known as Merengue típico originated in the rural Northern Cibao region around the city of Santiago, resulting in the name merengue cibaeño. Merengue típico emphasizes traditional songs dating back as far as the 19th century. This style of merengue was popularized by former dictator Rafael Trujillo, who was from the Cibao region. Trujillo and his brother, Jose Arismendy Trujillo, turned merengue into the cultural symbol that it is today by investing in merengue bands and controlling many aspects of the music industry. They used merengue as a form of propaganda and national pride. Previously merengue had often been as a social commentary and under Trujillo it morphed to songs that praised him and the government. Because of Trujillo's influence Merengue típico is now the main form of merengue in the Dominican Republic.

== See also ==
- Music of the Dominican Republic
- Culture of the Dominican Republic
- Latin American music
- Méringue (Haitian version)
- Cuarteto (Argentine version)
- Merengue Music
