= Cristian Rivero (actor) =

Peruvian actor (born 1978)

- Born: Cristian Karlo Rivero Schoster; November 24, 1978 (age 46); Lima, Peru
- Occupation(s): Actor, Model, TV Host
- Years active: 1991-present
- Height: 1.88 m (6 ft 2 in)

Cristian Karlo Rivero Schoster is a Peruvian television host, actor and male model, most known for being Gisela Valcárcel's co-host in all her TV shows.

== Participations ==
=== TV shows ===
Year	Name	Role
1991–1993	Nubeluz	Cast Member
2000	Aló Gisela	Co-conductor
2002	Gisela	Co-Host
2003	La casa de Gisela	Host
2004	PopStar	Host
2006–2007	BloopTV	Host
2007–2008	Desafío y Fama	Host
2008	Bailando por un sueño (Perú)	Invitado especial
2009	El Show de los Sueños	Co-Host
2010	El Gran Show	Co-Host

=== Telenovela ===
Year	Name	Character
1998	Torbellino	---
1999	Girasoles para Lucía	---
2006	Que buena raza	Fabián
2007	Golpe a golpe	Fabián
2007	Así es la vida	Rafael
2008	La Fuerza fénix	Willy
2008	Necesito una amiga	Varios
2009	Clave uno: médicos en alerta (segunda temporada)	Gonzalo
2009	Los exitosos Gomes	Tomás
2010	LaLola	Facundo

=== Theater ===
Year	Act	Character
2006	El lago de los cisnes	Príncipe
2008	Pinocho	Stromboli
2006	Teatro desde el teatro	Varios
