= List of Peruvian films =

A list of films produced in Peru in year order. For a list of films A-Z currently with an article on Wikipedia see Category:Peruvian films.

== 1910s ==
Title	Director	Cast	Genre	Notes
1911
The Peruvian Centaurs	Jorge Goytizolo		Documentary	The first known Peruvian documentary
'1912
1913
Negocio Al Agua(Water Business)	Federico Blume and Corbacho		Comedy	The film is a comedy where a young millionaire is besieged by two life-seekers.
Del Manicomio Al Matrimonio (From Asylum to Marriage)	María Isabel Sánchez-Concha, Fernando Lund		Family drama Comedy	Mystery comedy film
1914
1915
1916
1917
1918
1919

== 1920s ==
Title	Director	Cast	Genre	Notes
1920
1921
El Oriente Peruano			Documentary	
1922
Camino de la Venganza	Drama filmed by the photographer and painter Luis Ugarte, Narciso Rada		Drama	The first Peruvian national feature film that depicts the fate of a mining town controlled by an English engineer
1923
1924
Revista Excelsior de Actualidades Peruanas			News documentary	
1925
Revista de Actualidades Limeñas de Cinematográfica Mundial			News documentary	
1926
Páginas Heróicas(Heroic Pages)				Film based on the War of the Pacific
1927
Luis Pardo	Enrique Cornejo Villanueva		Adventure	Shot with the style of Douglas Fairbanks tapes
1928
La Perricholi	Enzo Longhi, Guillermo Garland, Luis Scaglione		Historical drama	The silent film is a milestone in the age of Oncenio (Patria Nueva) of Augusto B. Leguía government rule
1929
Los Abismos De La Vida	Stefanía Socha			Directorial debut of Polish actress Stefanía Socha
Creo en Dios				First synced soundtrack
Como Chaplin	Alberto Santana		Satire comedy	Featured protagonist was Rodolfo Areu's imitation of Chaplin
La Conquista de la Selva	Guillermo Garland Higginson		Travel documentary	Peru's earliest travelogues
Viaje a Cusco y Chanchamayo	Guillermo Garland Higginson		Travel documentary	Peru's earliest travelogues

== 1930s ==
Title	Director	Cast	Genre	Notes
1930
Alma Peruana	Alberto Santana			
La Ultima Lágrima				
Mientras Lima Duerme	Alberto Santana			
El Carnaval Del Amor	Pedro Sambarino			Based on an argument by Julio Alfonso Hernandez; The script was written by Ángela Ramos
1931
Las Chicas Del Jirón de la Unión	Alberto Santana			
Bajo el Cielo Peruano	Guillermo Garland Higginson		Travel documentary	
1932
Como Serán Vuestros Hijos	Alberto Santana			
1933
Yo Perdí Mi Corazón en Lima	Alberto Santana		Silent cinema	Filmed by Chilean producer who directed in Peru
1934
Resaca	Alberto Santana			The first Peruvian sound film from Lima
Cosas De La Vida				Second sound
1935
1936
Buscando Olvido	Sigifredo Salas			First sound film with optical sound
El Último Adiós	Sigifredo Salas	Alejandro Valle, Alejo Lopez, Amelia Altabas		The first Peruvian all-talking film
1937
La Bailarina Loca	Ricardo Villarán			Produced by Amauta Films
Sangre de Selva	Ricardo Villarán			Produced by Amauta Films
De Doble Filo	Ricardo Villarán			Produced by Amauta Films
1938
Gallo de mi Galpón	Sigifredo Salas	Óscar Ortiz de Pinedo, Gloria Travesí, Jose Luis Romero	Musical film	Produced by Amauta Films; the trilogy film set a milestone for Peruvian musicals with two film other films released
El Guapo del Pueblo	Sigifredo Salas			Produced by Amauta Films,
Palomillas del Rímac	Sigifredo Salas	Edmundo Moreau, María Manuela, Roque Pascuale		Filmed by 1930s pioneers in Peruvian film industry; Produced by Amauta Films
De Carne Somos	Sigifredo Salas			Produced by Amauta Films
El Miedo a la Vida	Sigifredo Salas			Produced by Amauta Films
La Falsa Huella	Sigifredo Salas			Produced by Amauta Films
Corazón Criollo				Produced by Propesa
Padre a la Fuerza				Produced by Propesa
1939
Almas en Derrota	Sigifredo Salas			
Barco Sin Rumbo	Sigifredo Salas			The film was censored
Cómo Atropellas Cachafaz	Cesar Miró			
El Vértigo de los Cóndores	Saa Silva			Produced by Ollanta Films
Esa Noche Tuvo la Culpa	Ricardo Villarán			Produced by Amauta Films

== 1940s ==
Title	Director	Cast	Genre	Notes
1940
Tierra Linda	Sigifredo Salas			Produced by Amauta Films
1941
Alerta en la Frontera (1941 film)	Kurt Herrmann		War documentary	Based on the Ecuadorian–Peruvian war of 1941
1942
Penas de Amor	Ricardo Villarán			
1943
1944
1945
A Río Revuelto				
1946
La Lunareja(The Moon)	Bernardo Roca Rey	Matilde Urrutia, Antonio Flores Estrada, Joaquin Roca Rey		Located in the film library of Lima Based on an episode of the war for the emancipation of the Spanish crown
1947
1948
Una Apuesta con Satanás				
1949

== 1950s ==
Title	Director	Cast	Genre	Notes
1950
1951
1952
Sabotaje en Laselva	Edward Movius		Adventure	Directed by a North American director living in Peru that set an episode of the Cold War in the Peruvian Amazon jungle
1953
1954
1955
Yo la Quería Patita	Pascual Salvatore		Short film	Considered as the first Peruvian video clip
1956
Las Piedras(The Stones)	Manuel Chambi, Luis Figueroa		Documentary	One of the first film documentaries by Cine Club Cuzco featuring the footage of ancient ruins of the Inca Empire
Carnaval de Kanas	Manuel Chambi		Documentary	Won first prize at the first Peruvian Film Festival (1965)
Lucero de Nieve	Manuel Chambi, Eulogio Nishiyama		Documentary	
1957
Corrida de Toros y Condors	Manuel Chambi, Eulogio Nishiyama		Documentary	
1958
La Muerte Llega en el 2° Show	José María Roselló			The only film directed in Lima in the 1950s
1959
Noche y Alba	Victor and Manuel Chambi		Documentary	
Los Invencibles de Kanas	Victor and Manuel Chambi			

== 1960s ==
Title	Director	Cast	Genre	Notes
1960
El Solitario de Sayán				Based on Peruvian events
La Fiesta de las Nieves	Victor and Manuel Chambi		Documentary	Exhibited at the XII Karlovy Vary International Film Festival
Ochocientas Leguas por el Amazonas (La Jangada) Eight Hundred Leagues Across the Amazon (The Raft)	Rafael Bertrand		Documentary	
1961
Kukuli (Kukuli)	Luis Figueroa, Eulogio Nishiyama, César Villanueva	Judith Figueroa, Victor Chambi, Lizardo Pérez, Emilio Galli, Felix Valeriano	Drama	Entered into the 2nd Moscow International Film Festival Masterpiece of Cine Club Cuzco that featured the story of Andean mythological story about the fight of a man against a ukuku.
Vida de los Campesinos de Chincheros	Manuel Chambi		Documentary	
Ayaviri	Manuel Chambi		Documentary	
1962
Cajamarca, Tierra del Sol				Participated in the Berlin International Film Festival. Based on Peruvian events
Piura				Based on Peruvian events
Puertas Hacia el Mar			Documentary	Based on Peruvian events
Machu Picchu	Manuel Chambi			
1963
Estampas del Carnaval de Kanas	Manuel Chambi		Documentary	
1964
Estampas del Carnaval de Kunturichanki	Manuel Chambi		Documentary	
Ganarás el Pan	Armando Robles Godoy			First feature film of Armando Robles Godoy
1965
Ukuku	Manuel Chambi		Documentary	
La fiesta de la Candelaria en Puno	Manuel Chambi		Documentary	
1966
Jarawi	César Villanueva, Eulogio Nishiyama			Based on a story Diamantes y Pedernales by José María Arguedas Last film directed by the School of Cuzco club
1967
A la Sombra del Sol (In the Shade of the Sun)				
No Stars in the Jungle (En la selva no hay estrellas)	Armando Robles Godoy	Ignacio Quirós, Susana Pardahl, Luisa Otero, Jorge Montoro, César David Miró, Manuel Delorio	Adventure	Entered into the 5th Moscow International Film Festival
1968
Annabelle Lee				
1969

== 1970s ==
Title	Director	Cast	Genre	Notes
1970
Anthropology: A Study of People				
The Green Wall (La Muralla Verde)	Armando Robles Godoy	Julio Alemán, Sandra Riva, Raúl Martin, Lorena Duval, Enrique Victoria, Jorge Montoro	Drama	Won the Golden Hugo Award at the Chicago International Film Festival in 1970
Dos Familias	Manuel Chambi		Documentary	
1971
La Araucana				
1972
Mirage (Espejismo)	Armando Robles Godoy	Miguel Angel Flores, Helena Rojo, Hernán Romero, Orlando Sacha, Gabriel Figueroa	Drama	Story of a man's quest to find answers to his abandoned estate at the edge of a Peruvian desert in a series flashback espejismo (mirage)
Salvador Akoski	Leonidas Zegarra			
Cholo	Bernardo Batievsky	Hugo Sotil	Sports film	Sports film that starred Peruvian football midfield striker Hugo Sotil
1973
De Nuevo a la Vida	Leonidas Zegarra			
1974
Arrows				
Mantaro, Fenómeno Imprevisible	Manuel Chambi		Documentary	
Los Universitarios	Manuel Chambi		Documentary	
De la Recolección a la Agricultura	Manuel Chambi		Documentary	
Agua Salada	Arturo Sinclair		Fiction short film	First fiction short made in Peru after Law # 19327 that had a mystical theme that combined images and music
1975
Allpakallpa (Allpa Kallpa)	Bernardo Arias	Zully Azurin, Tulio Loza, Jorge Pool Cano, Cuchita Salazar, Hudson Valdiva	Drama	Entered into the 9th Moscow International Film Festival
1976
1977
Muerte al Amanecer	Francisco J. Lombardi			
Los Perros Hambrientos	Luis Figueroa			Based on the eponymous novel by Ciro Alegría
Kuntur Wachana	Federico García			
1978
Sonata Soledad	Armando Robles Godoy			
Cuentos Inmorales (1978 Film)	Augusto Tamayo, Francisco J. Lombardi, Pili Flores-Guerra, José Carlos Huayhuaca	Gustavo Vergara, Melanie Frayssinet, Carmen Rosa Diez, Yvonne Frayssinet	Tragedy, Humor	A project by four filmmakers
1979
Yawar Fiesta	Luis Figueroa			Based on the eponymous novel by José María Arguedas
Laulico	Federico García			Presented at the first new Latin American Film Festival in Havana, Cuba
Crónica de Dos Mundos	José Antonio Portugal		Short film	Short film on fiction and history

== 1980s ==
Title	Director	Cast	Genre	Notes
1980
Abisa a los Compañeros	Felipe Degregori		Drama	Based on the novel Abisa a los Compañeros, Pronto by Guillermo Thorndike
Aventuras Prohibidas	Augusto Tamayo, José Carlos Huayhuaca			
La Muerte de un Magnate	Francisco J. Lombardi		Drama	
1981
1982
La Familia Orozco	Jorge Reyes		Drama	
Ojos de Perro	Alberto Durant			
Miss Universo en el Perú			Documentary	Produced by Grupo Chaski (Chaski Group)
El Enigma de la Pantalla y El Último Show	Juan Carlos Huayhuaca		Short film	
1983
Maruja en el Infierno	Francisco J. Lombardi	Elena Romero	Drama	Based on the novel No una Sino Muchas Muertes by Enrique Congrains
El Viento de Ayahuasca	Nora de Izcue		Fiction	
1984
Túpac Amaru	Federico García Hurtado	Reinaldo Arenas, Zully Azurín, Cesar Urueta, Carlos Cano	Historical drama	Reinaldo Arenas depicted Túpac Amaru II while Zully Azurín depicted Micaela Bastidas
Gregorio (1984 Film)	Grupo Chaski, Fernando Espinoza, Alejandro Legaspi, Stefan Kaspar		Drama	
Hombres de Vento	José Antonio Portugal		Short film	
1985
The City and the Dogs	Francisco José Lombardi	Alberto Isola, Gustavo Bueno, Luis Álvarez, Juan Manuel Ochoa, Eduardo Adrianzén	Drama	Based on The Time of the Hero, a 1963 novel by Mario Vargas Llosa
Caminos de Liberación	Grupo Chaski		Short documentary	Film addresses the theme of liberation
1986
Malabrigo	Alberto Durant			
Profesión: Detective	José Carlos Huayhuaca			
1987
La Fuga del Chacal	Augusto Tamayo, San Román	Jorge García Bustamante, Mónica Domínguez, Toño Vega, Carlos Cano de la Fuente, Juan Manuel Ochoa	Action Adventure	Most popular film in the 1900s
Juliana	Grupo Chaski, Fernando Espinoza, Alejandro Legaspi and Stefan Kaspar	Rosa Isabel Morfino, Julio Vega, Maritza Gutti, Guillermo Esqueche	Drama	Film based on street performer children
Misión en los Andes	Luis Llosa	Luis Llosa	Action Adventure	
El Socio de Dios	Federico García, Roger Rumrill			
Sonata Soledad	Armando Robles Godoy			
Encuentro de Hombrecitos	Alejandro Legaspi		Documentary Short film	Produced by Grupo Chaski (Chaski Group)
Margot la del Circo	Alejandro Legaspi		Documentary Short film	Produced by Grupo Chaski (Chaski Group)
Sueños Lejanos	Alejandro Legaspi		Short documentary	Winner of the award for best Peruvian documentary at the Peruvian Film Festival Perou Pacha in Paris
1988
The Mouth of the Wolf	Francisco José Lombardi	Gustavo Bueno, Toño Vega, José Tejada, Gilberto Torres, Bertha Pagaza, Antero Sanchez, Aristóteles Picho	Drama	Peruvian entry for the Best Foreign Language Film at the 61st Academy Awards
1989
La Manzanita del Diablo	Federico García	Tania Helfgott		

== 1990s ==
Title	Director	Cast	Genre	Notes
1990
Fallen from Heaven	Francisco J. Lombardi	Elide Brero, Gustavo Bueno, Rafael Garay, Carlos Gassols, Marisol Palacios, Delfina Paredes, Nelson Ruiz	Drama	Peruvian entry for the Best Foreign Language Film at the 63rd Academy Awards
Ni con Dios ni con El Diablo	Nilo Pereira del Mar			
1991
Alias 'La Gringa'	Alberto Durant	Germán González, Elsa Olivero, Orlando Sacha, Juan Manuel Ochoa, Enrique Victoria	Drama	Peruvian entry for the Best Foreign Language Film at the 64th Academy Award
El Aniversario				
Apu Cóndor			Documentary	
La Lengua de Los Zorros	Federico García			
La Vida es Una Sola	Marianne Eyde			
1992
1993
Eight Hundred Leagues Down the Amazon	Luis Llosa	Daphne Zuniga, Tom Verica, Barry Bostwick, Adam Baldwin, E.E. Bell, Ramsay Ross	Action adventure	Based on the novel Eight Hundred Leagues on the Amazon by Jules Verne
Report on Death (Reportaje a la muerte)	Danny Gavidia	Diego Bertie, Marisol Palacios, Carlos Cano de la Fuente, Carlos Gassols, Martha Figueroa	Drama	According to Global Affairs Canada, Reportaje a la muerte is one of the films to see to learn more about the culture of Peru
Todos Somos Estrellas	Felipe Degregori			
1994
Without Compassion (Sin Compasión)	Francisco José Lombardi	Diego Bertie, Adriana Dávila, Jorge Chiarella, Marcello Rivera	Drama	Based on Dostoyevsky's Crime and Punishment
1995
Anda, Corre, Vuela	Augusto Tamayo			
1996
Bajo la Piel	Francisco J. Lombardi	José Luis Ruiz Barahona, Ana Risueño, Diego Bertie, Gianfranco Brero	Drama	Story based on drama
Asia, el Culo del Mundo	Juan Carlos Torrico			
1997
Anaconda	Luis Llosa		Action Adventure	American film by Peruvian director
La Cuerda Floja	Fabrizio Aguilar		Short film	Adaptation of the story The Clown by Gonzalo Mariátegui
1998
Coraje	Alberto Durant			
Don't Tell Anyone	Francisco J. Lombardi			
Elena Izcue: La Armonia Silenciosa	Nora de Izcue		Documentary	
1999
A la Medianoche y Media	Mariana Rondón, Marite Ugáz			
La Carnada	Marianne Eyde			
Captain Pantoja and the Special Services	Francisco J. Lombardi		Comedy	Based on Captain Pantoja and the Special Service by Mario Vargas Llosa
Lima Enferma, el año que hicimos Keterpliff	Fermin Tangüis Figueroa	Norma Martinez, Ana Pfeiffer, Julio Gayoso, Cristian Franco, Lily Garayar, Lua Garma, Basilio Soraluz	Comedy	

== 2000s ==
Title	Director	Cast	Genre	Notes
2000
Imposible Amor	Armando Robles Godoy			
Red Ink	Francisco J. Lombardi	Gianfranco Brero, Giovanni Ciccia, Fele Martinez, Lucía Jiménez	Crime, Drama	Based on the eponymous novel by Alberto Fuguet
Ciudad de M (2000 Film)	Felipe Degregori	Santiago Magill, Christian Meier	Drama	
La Yunta Brava	Federico García Hurtado		Drama	Based on a real story
2001
El abigeo	Flaviano Quispe	Percy Pacco Lima, Flaviano Quispe, Fernando Pacori Mamani, Victoria Ylaquito Zapana, Ney Torres Humpire, Nelly Gonzáles, Yeni Benique Benique	Crime, Drama	
El Bien Esquivo	Augusto Tamayo			
Lost Bullet	Aldo Salvini	Rodrigo Sánchez Patiño, Pablo Saldarriaga, Daniela Sarfati, Monserrat Brugué, Ramsay Ross, Aristóteles Picho	Surrealist, Crime, Drama	
Mi crimen al desnudo	Leonidas Zegarra	Maribel Alarcón, Julio Berrocal, Juana Judith Bustos, Susy Díaz, Mario Poggi, Rossy War, Yesabella, Américo Zúñiga, Víctor Ángeles	Crime, Drama, Thriller	
Vladifaldas al Ataque	Cucho Sarmiento			
2002
Away				
Choropampa, The Price of Gold	Ernesto Cabellos, Stephanie Boyd		Documentary	Documentary that highlighted the plight of a village in Choropampa due to contamination of gold trade mining
Django: la Otra Cara	Ricardo Velásquez	Giovanni Ciccia, Melania Urbina, Sergio Galliani, Tatiana Astengo	Action, Political drama	
El forastero	Federico García Hurtado			
Jarjacha	Melitón Eusebio			
2003
Archivo Courret. Un Estorbo de Cien mil Dólares			Documentary	
Are You Feeling Lonely?	Rosario García-Montero		Short film	
Destiny Has No Favorites	Álvaro Velarde de la Rosa	Angie Cepeda		
Ladies Room	Michel Katz	Lorena Meritano, Viviana Gibelli, Eduardo Santamarina, Andrea Montenegro	Romantic comedy	
A Martian Named Desire	Antonio Fortunic		Science fiction, Romantic drama	
Paper Dove	Fabrizio Aguilar	Antonio Callirgos, Eduardo Cesti, Aristóteles Picho, Liliana Trujillo	Drama	Directorial debut of Fabrizio Aguilar
Polvo enamorado	Luis Barrios		Drama	
Vedettes al Desnudo	Leonidas Zegarra	Wilmer Ato, Susy Díaz, Azuzena del Río	Crime, Drama, Thriller	
What the Eye Doesn't See	Francisco J. Lombardi		Drama	
Y si te vi, no me acuerdo	Miguel Barreda	Miguel Iza, Marisol Palacios, Matthias Dittmer, Gilberto Torres, Delfina Paredes	Drama, Road movie	
2004
Almas en Pena	Mélinton Eusebio			
Aura				
Coca Mama	Marianne Eyde		Drama	
Days of Santiago	Josué Méndez	Pietro Sibille, Lili Urbina, Milagros Vidal, Marisela Puicón	Drama	Drama film based on debt
The Motorcycle Diaries	Walter Salles	Gael García Bernal, Rodrigo de la Serna, Mercedes Morán, Jean Pierre Noher, Facundo Espinosa	Biopic-Memoir	Highest-grossing movie in Peruvian cinema history
El Viento de Todas Partes	Nora de Izcue		Documentary	
Doble Juego	Alberto Durant		Drama	Co-production between Spain, Cuba, Argentina, and Peru
El Misterio del Kharisiri	Henry Vallejo			
El Panteonero	Juan Infante, Romina Cruz		Documentary	
Flor de Retama	Martín Landeo Vega			
Juanito El Huerfanito	Flaviano Quispe			
Lima ¡Was!	Alejandro Rossi		Documentary	
Los Taitas	Héctor Marreros			
Triste Realidad	Fredy Larico		Drama	
Vientos de Amor y Pecado	Jasmiani Vilca			
Zapatos Nuevos	Héctor Marreros			
2005
Pirates in Callao	Eduardo Schuldt	Diego Bertie, Stephanie Cayo, Salvador del Solar	CGI pirate animation adventure	Based on the children's book of the same name written by Hernán Garrido Lecca
Al Son de mi Familia				
Apu Oncoy: Una voz, un Sueño en los Andes				
Arena Iva				
Mañana te cuento	Eduardo Mendoza de Echave	Bruno Ascenzo, Óscar Beltrán	Romantic, Comedy-drama	
Madeinusa	Claudia Llosa	Magaly Solier	Drama	
2006
El Acuarelista	Daniel Rodríguez Risco			
Black Butterfly	Francisco Lombardi	Darío Abad, Gustavo Bueno, Montserrat Carulla	Drama	
Morir Antes Que Esclavos Vivir	Victoria Chicón, Víctor Damián			
The Trial	Judith Velez	Jimena Lindo, Gianfranco Brero, Pietro Sibille		Selected in the Peruvian Film Showcase in NYC celebrating the 500th anniversary of Vasco Núñez de Balboa's first sighting of the Pacific Ocean
Dragones: destino de fuego (Dragones: destino de fuego)	Eduardo Schuldt	Gianmarco Zignago, Gianella Neyra, Silvia Navarro	CGI animation	Alpamayo Entertainment was the production studio
Good Bye Pachacutek	Federico Gabriel García			Premiered on 28 September
Peloteros	Coco Castillo	Joel Ezeta, Marco Antonio Solís, Christian Ruiz, Stefano Tosso, Frank Mac Bride, Maricarmen Marín	Sports, Action, Comedy-drama	
Talk Show	Sandro Ventura	Fiorella Rodríguez, Karina Calmet, Gonzalo Revoredo, Roger del Águila	Comedy	
2007
La Gran Sangre: La Película	Jorge Carmona		Action	
Muero por Muriel	Augusto Cabada		Drama	
Crossing a Shadow	Augusto Tamayo	Diego Bertie, Vanessa Saba, Gonzalo Molina, Rossana Fernández-Maldonado	Drama	Peruvian entry for the Best Foreign Language Film at the 80th Academy Award
Chullachaqui	Dorian Fernández-Moris		Short film	
Milagroso Udilberto Vásquez	Héctor Marreros		Drama	
2008
Mañana te cuento 2	Eduardo Mendoza de Echave		Romantic, Comedy-drama	
300 Millas en Busca de Mamá	Leonidas Zegarra	Marinana Liquitaya (Madre), Lida Aquise (Rocío), Rimber Caballero (Ariel), Obdulia Pezo Ochoa (Abuela), Susy Díaz (Amiga), Eddie Hidalgo (Tramitador)	Crime, Drama, Comedy	
El Acuarelista	Daniel Rodríguez		Comedy	
Inmortal	Dorian Fernández-Moris		Short film	
Los Actores	Omar Forero			
Pasajeros	Andrés Cotler	Pietro Sibille, Marcelo Rivera, Mónica Sánchez, Eduardo Cesti	Drama	
Valentino y El Clan del Can	David Bisbano		Animation	
Dioses	Josué Méndez		Drama	
Vidas Paralelas	Rocío Lladó		Action Drama	
2009
The Milk Of Sorrow	Claudia Llosa	Magaly Solier	Drama	
Paraíso	Héctor Gálvez	Joaquín Ventura, Yiliana Chong, José Luis García, Gabriela Tello	Drama	Won an award in Switzerland
Máncora	Ricardo de Montreuil			
Tarata	Fabrizio Aguilar	Gisela Valcárcel, Miguel Iza, Ricardo Ota, Silvana Cañote	Drama	
Motor y motivo	Enrique Chimoy			
El Premio	Alberto Durant			
Cu4tro	Frank Pérez-Garland, Christian Buckley, Sergio Barrio, Bruno Ascenzo		Drama	
El Delfín: La Historia de un Soñador	Eduardo Schuldt	Daniel Alejandro, Moisés Iván Mora, Octavio Rojas, Ricardo Tejedo, Leyla Rangel	3D Animation	Highest-grossing movie in 2009
Illary	Nilo Pereira del Mar		Drama	
El Perro del Hortelano	Renzo Zanelli			
Madre: una Ilusión Convertida en Pesadilla	Daniel Nuñez Durán		Drama	

== 2010s ==
Title		Director	Cast	Genre	Notes
2010
María y los niños pobres		Leonidas Zegarra Uceda (assistant director: Jorge L. Villacorta)	Mariana Liquitaya (Virgen María), Sebastián Obermaier (Padre Mayor), Jorge Luis Villacorta Santamato (Padre Jorge), Mauricio Aparicio (Ronaldo), Ronax Arandia (Padre Pedro), Daniel Arauco (Traficante de droga), Maria Esther Arteaga (Mamá Mala), Juan Víctor Barra (Papá Malo), Galia Barriga (Evelyn), Gladys Blanco Cliente 1), Alain Cabrera, Franz Calderón (Testigo de la aparición de la Virgen), Uilda Calisaya (Testigo de la aparición de la Virgen), José Carbajal (Maestro José), Marco Castro (Secuestrador 1), Beatriz Chávez (Hija de Mamá mala),	Crime, Thriller, Drama	Shot in La Paz (Bolivia), edited in Lima (Peru). Exhibited in Puno and Juli (Peru), La Paz and El Alto (Bolivia). Exhibited at the National Library of Peru in 2017. Covered in Peruvian newspapers, Bolivian newspapers and scholarly articles
El Niño Pepita		Claudia Llosa		Short film	
October	Octubre	Daniel Vega Vidal, Diego Vega Vidal	Bruno Odar, Gabriela Velásquez, Carlos Gassols, María Carbajal	Drama	Peruvian entry for the Best Foreign Language Film at the 84th Academy Awards
Rehenes		Bruno Ortiz León		Drama	
Reminiscences	Reminiscencias	Juan Daniel F. Molero		Documentary	
El Último Piso		Dorian Fernández-Moris		Drama	
The Vigil	La vigilia	Augusto Tamayo	Gianfranco Brero, Stephanie Orúe, Tommy Párraga, Jaime Zevallos, Miriam Reátegui, Carlos Orbegozo	Thriller, Drama	
2011
The Bad Intentions	Las malas intenciones	Rosario García-Montero	Fátima Buntinx, Katerina D'Onofrio	Drama	Peruvian entry for the Best Foreign Language Film at the 85th Academy Awards
The Inca, The Silly Girl, and the Son of a Thief	El inca, la boba y el hijo del ladrón	Ronnie Temoche	Carlos Cubas, Flor Quesada, Manuel Baca, Evelyn Azabache, Cristian Ysla, Oscar Beltrán, Alejandra Guerra, Fernando Zevallos	Romantic drama, Road movie	
Lars and the Mystery of the Portal	Lars y el misterio del portal	Eduardo Schuldt	Bruno Ascenzo, Melania Urbina, Nicolas Vilallonga	CGI animation	
The Last Chanka Warrior	El último guerrero Chanka	Víctor Amadeo, Zarabia Almanza	Víctor Zarabia, José Landeo, Alejandro Leguia, Yeimi Córdova, Elmer Huáman, Rosbita Huáman, Celestino Ancco, Reynaldo Altamirano, Lourdes Bravo, Pedro Pozo	Epic, Martial Arts, Adventure	
2012
El Buen Pedro		Sandro Ventura	Miguel Torres-Böhl, Roger del Águila, Natalia Salas, Adolfo Aguilar, Adriana Quevedo, Carlos Álvarez, Laura Del Busto	Thriller drama	
Chicama		Omar Forero		Drama	Named Best Peruvian Film of the 2013
Choleando		Roberto de la Puente	Mariananda Schempp & Julio Navarro	Documentary	
The Cleaner	El limpiador	Adrián Saba	Víctor Prada, Adrián Du Bois, Miguel Iza, Ana Cecilia Natteri	Drama	Peruvian entry for the Best Foreign Language Film at the 86th Academy Awards
Coliseo		Alejandro Rossi		Historical musical	
The Illusionauts	Los ilusionautas	Eduardo Schuldt	Moisés Suárez, Moisés Iván Mora, Julio Morín	CGI animation, Science fiction, Adventure, Comedy	A family animation film about Jules Verne's Voyages Extraordinaires
In House	Casadentro	Joanna Lombardi Pollarolo			
A Mouse Tale	Rodencia y el diente de la princesa	David Bisbano	Hernán Bravo, Natalia Rosminati, Ricardo Alanis, Enrique Porcellana, Sergio Bermejo, Oswaldo Salas	CGI animation	Peruvian-Argentine co production
No Hay Lugar Más Diverso		Felipe Degregori		Documentary	
El Ordenador		Omar Forero			
2013
¡Asu mare!		Ricardo Maldonado	Carlos Alcántara, Gisela Ponce de León, Carlos Carlín	Comedy	Highest-grossing movie in 2010s with an unprecedented viewership
The Space Between Things	El espacio entre las cosas	Raul del Busto	Natalia Pena, Fernando Escribens, Ricardo Sandi, Fernando Vilchez, Ryowa Uehara	Experimental, Fantasy, Drama	
Esther Somewhere	Esther en alguna parte	Gerardo Chijona	Reynaldo Miravalles, Enrique Molina, Daisy Granados, Eslinda Núñez, Alicia Bustamante, Verónica Lynn, Paula Ali, Laura De la Uz, Luis Alberto García, Elsa Camp, Héctor Medina, Danae Hernandez, Kevin Kovayashi	Comedy-drama	Winner – Best Actor for Reynaldo Miravalles at the 2014 Havana Film Festival New York
The Gospel of the Flesh	El evangelio de la carne	Eduardo Mendoza de Echave	Giovanni Ciccia, Jimena Lindo	Drama	Peruvian entry for the Best Foreign Language Film at the 87th Academy Awards
The Knife of Don Juan	La navaja de Don Juan	Tom Sanchez	JC Montoya, Rodrigo Viaggio, Irma Maury, Antonio Arrué, Viviana Andrade, Jorge Gutiérrez, Nataniel Sánchez, Fernando Petong, Jimena Venturo, Deyssi Pelaez, Sebastian Rubio, Jaime Calle	Comedy-drama	
El mudo		Daniel Vega Vidal, Diego Vega Vidal	Fernando Bacilio, Lidia Rodríguez, Juan Luis Maldonado, Augusto Varillas, José Luis Gómez	Drama	Screened in the Contemporary World Cinema section at the 2013 Toronto International Film Festival.
Responso Para un Abrazo: Tras la Huella de un Poeta		Nora de Izcue		Documentary	
Sigo Siendo		Javier Corcuera	Amelia Panduro, César Calderón, José Izquierdo, Jaime Guardia, Magaly Solier	Documentary	
2014
La Amante del Libertador		Rocío Lladó		Historical Drama	
Back to School	A Los 40	Bruno Ascenzo	Carlos Alcántara, Carlos Carlín, Katia Condos	Comedy	
The Blue Hour	La hora azul	Evelyne Pegot	Giovanni Ciccia, Jackelyn Vásquez, Rossana Fernández-Maldonado	Drama	
The Chain	Encadenados	Miguel Barreda	Martha Rebaza, Arcadio Trujillo, Carlos Corzo Holguin, John Davila, Lorena Pamo, Norma Martínez, Melania Urbina, Jorge “Pelo” Madueño, Miguel Iza	Anthology, Drama	
Chesu mare: Bullying diabólico		Leonidas Zegarra Uceda	Mariana Liquitaya, Leonidas Zegarra, René Ravines, [Susy Díaz, Monique Pardo, 'Huanchaco' (Fernando Alonso Gutiérrez Cassinelli), Jorge L. Villacorta, Gian Carlos Acosta Marín, Israel Alarcón Leguía], Sandra Alcocer Guinetti	Biography	
Extirpator of Idolatries	Extirpador de idolatrías	Manuel Siles	Magaly Solier, Augusto Casafranca, Oswaldo Salas, Paulina Bazán	Drama Fantasy Mystery	Shot with a Canon EOS 5D Mark II camera
Gloria del Pacífico		Juan Carlos Oganes	Carlos Vertiz, Gustavo Mac Lennan, Reinaldo Arenas	Epic, War, Historical Drama	
Guard Dog	Perro guardián	Baltazar Caravedo, Daniel Higashionna		Drama	
F-27: The Movie	F-27	Willy Combe	Óscar López Arias, Karina Jordán, Franco Cabrera	Suspense, Drama	
Japy Ending		Ani Alva Helfer		Comedy	
Magallanes		Salvador del Solar	Magaly Solier, Damián Alcázar	Drama	Based on the novel La Pasajera by Alonso Cueto; winner – Best Film at 17th Havana Film Festival New York
NN	NN: Sin identidad	Héctor Gálvez	Paul Vega, Antonieta Pari, Isabel Gaona, Lucho Cáceres, Gonzalo Molina	Drama	Peruvian entry for the Best Foreign Language Film at the 88th Academy Awards
An Odd Evening in April	Loco cielo de Abril	Sandro Ventura	Fiorella Rodríguez, Ariel Levy, Adolfo Aguilar	Drama	
Trip to Timbuktu	Viaje a Tombuctú	Rossana Díaz Costa	Esteban Cueto, Andrea Patriau, Jair García, Matilda Martini	Drama	
Victoria		Dana Bonilla, Francesca Danovaro	Muki Sabogal, Oscar Carrillo, Diego Cáceres, Carlos Galiano	Fiction	Short film
Viejos amigos		Fernando Villarán Luján	Ricardo Blume, Carlos Gassols, Enrique Victoria Fernández	Comedy	
Yo mimo soy		Héctor Marreros	Alex Johanson, Arturo Alcántara, Sonia Medrano, Yajdel Vásquez, Juan Carlos Morales	Biopic, Comedy-drama	
2015
About Them	Ella & él	Frank Pérez-Garland		Romantic drama	
Al filo de la ley		Hugo Flores, Juan Carlos Flores	Julián Legaspi, Renato Rossini	Buddy cop, action	
¡Asu mare! 2		Ricardo Maldonado	Carlos Alcántara, Emilia Drago, Anahí de Cárdenas, Ana Cecilia Natteri, Denisse Dibós, Andrés Salas	Comedy	Watched over by 3 million viewers
El bandolero		Dante Rubio Rodrigo	Dante Rubio Rodrigo, Karol Villacorta	Martial arts, Thriller	
La Bestia Más Feroz		César Miranda	Muki Sabogal	Fiction	Short film
El cebichito		Martin Landeo	Estéfano Buchelli, Carlos Noriega	Comedy	
Daughter of the Lake	Hija de la laguna	Ernesto Cabellos	Nélida Ayay Chilón, Maxima Acuna Atalaya Chaupe, Andrea Martínez Martínez	Documentary	
The Debt		Barney Elliott	Stephen Dorff, David Strathairn, Brooke Langton, Carlos Bardem, Alberto Ammann	Thriller, Drama	Highest-grossing movie in 2015
La herencia		Gastón Vizcarra	Tatiana Astengo, Christian Thorsen, Aldo Miyashiro, Alessandra Denegrí, Jesús Alzamora, Claudia Dammert, Korina Rivadeneira	Comedy	
Just Like in the Movies	Como en el cine	Gonzalo Ladines	Manuel Gold, Pietro Sibille, Andres Salas, Gisela Ponce de León	Comedy	
Lusers		Ticoy Rodriguez	Carlos Alcántara, Felipe Izquierdo, Pablo Granados	Adventure, Comedy	
La Luz de Mis Ojos		Carmen Rosa Vargas		Short documentary	
Macho peruano que se respeta		Carlitos Landeo	Carlos Vilchez	Romantic comedy	
The Nutcracker Sweet	El Cascanueces	Eduardo Schuldt	Alicia Silverstone, Ed Asner, Drake Bell	CGI animation	Produced by Aronnax Animation Studios
El pequeño seductor		Wilf Sifuentes	Miguel Barraza	Comedy	
Te Saludan los Cabitos		Luis Cintora		Documentary	
Vanish	Desaparecer	Dorian Fernández Moris	Ismael La Rosa, Óscar Carrillo, Teddy Guzmán,	Drama	
Videophilia (and Other Viral Syndromes)	Videofilia: y otros síndromes virales	Juan Daniel F. Molero	Muki Sabogal, Terom, Tilsa Otta, José Gabriel Alegría, Manuel Siles, Michel Lovón	Horror, Comedy-drama, Fantasy	Peruvian entry for the Best Foreign Language Film at the 89th Academy Awards
2016
Así nomás		Willy Combe		Comedy	
Asunción		Nicolás Carrasco, Rafael de Orbegoso	Muki Sabogal	Fiction	Short film
Aya		Francesca Canepa	Hebert Randy Pillco Huaman, Eulalia Salomo	Short documentary	
Calichín		Ricardo Maldonado		Sports, Comedy	
El Candidato		Álvaro Velarde		Political comedy, Satire	
The Dreamer	El soñador	Adrián Saba	Gustavo Borjas, Elisa Tenaud, Herbert Corimanya, Valentín Prado, Eugenio Vidal, Manuel Gold, Tatiana Espinoza, Adrién Du Bois, Luis Kanashiro, Milena Alva, Américo Zuñiga, Lucho Sandeval, Virachandra Williams, Bárbara Falconi	Romantic drama	Premiered on 16 February at the 66th Berlin International Film Festival Nominated – Youth Jury Generation 14plus – Best Film at the 66th Berlin International Film Festival Nominated – Best Picture at the 20th Lima Film Festival Winner – International Critics' Jury Award – Special Mention at the 20th Lima Film Festival Winner – Ministry of Culture Jury Prize at the 20th Lima Film Festival Nominated – Gold Hugo – New Directors Competition at the 52nd Chicago International Film Festival It had its commercial premiere on 26 January 2017, in Peruvian theaters
Guerrero		Fernando Villarán		Biographical film	
Locos de amor		Frank Pérez Garland	Gianella Neyra, Giovanni Ciccia, Gonzalo Revoredo, Rossana Fernández Maldonado	Romantic comedy, Musical	
Margarita		Frank Pérez Garland		Comedy	
Nuna, la Agonía del Wamani		Jimy Carhuas		Traditional 2D animated film	
One Last Afternoon	La última tarde	Joel Calero	Katerina D'Onofrio, Lucho Cáceres	Drama	Premiered on 6 August at the 20th Lima Film Festival First film in Calero's memory trilogy Its commercially released on 27 April 2017
La peor de mis bodas		Adolfo Aguilar		Comedy	
Súper Cóndor		Alejandro Nieto Polo		Superhero	
Seven Seeds	Siete semillas	Daniel Rodríguez Risco		Drama, Comedy	
Soledad.com		Antonio Landeo, Ítalo Lorenzzi, Martín Landeo	Julián Legaspi, Antonio Arrué	Science fiction, Thriller	
Sonata para un Calendario		Carmen Rosa Vargas		Short documentary	
La Última Noticia		Alejandro Legaspi		Drama	
Until My Mother-in-Law Separates Us	Hasta que la suegra nos separe	Carlitos Landeo	Carlos Álvarez, Leslie Shaw, Róger del Águila, Giovanna Valcárcel, Jesús Delaveaux, Manolo Rojas, Alonso Cano, Cecilia Tosso, Ramón García	Comedy	
El viaje macho		Luis Basurto	Luis Ramírez, Amiel Cayo, Magaly Solier, Juan Ubaldo Huamán	Drama, Road movie	
2017
Bleed. Scream. Beat!	Sangra. Grita. Late!	Aldo Miyashiro	Erika Villalobos, Kareen Spano, Manuel Calderón, Rómulo Assereto, Óscar Carrillo, Iván Chávez, Andrea Luna, Bruno Espejo, Fernando Castañeda, Katya Konychev	Thriller drama, Anthology	
Cebiche de tiburón		Daniel Winitzky	Manuel Gold, César Ritter, Wendy Ramos, Sergio Galliani	Adventure, Comedy	
Una comedia macabra		Sandro Ventura Mantilla		Comedy	
Condorito: la película		Alex Orrelle, Eduardo Schuldt	Omar Chaparro, Jessica Cediel, Cristián de la Fuente, Coco Legrand	Chilean-Peruvian 3D animated action comedy film	Highest-grossing film in 2017
Deliciosa fruta seca		Ana Caridad Sánchez	Claudia Dammert, Hugo Vasquez, Mauricio Fernandini, Cinthya Calderón	Drama	
Gemelos sin cura		Carlitos Landeo	Pablo 'Melcochita' Villanueva, Hernán Romero, Samuel Sunderland, Giovanna Varcárcel, Daniela Ramírez, Nico Ames, Sergio Galliani, Claudia Dammert, Tatiana Espinoza, Ricardo Cabrera, Cindy Marino	Comedy	
El gran León		Ricardo Maldonado		Romantic comedy	
The Last Hour	La hora final	Eduardo Mendoza de Echave	Pietro Sibille, Nidia Bermejo	Thriller, Drama	
Nadie sabe para quién trabaja		Harold Trompetero	Robinson Díaz, Jessica Cediel, Adolfo Aguilar, Hernán Méndez Alonso, Francisco Bolívar, Claudio Cataño, Primo Rojas, Germán Quintero, Diego Camargo, Diego Mateus	Black comedy	
Una Navidad en Verano		Ricardo Morán		Comedy	
Pacificum, Return to the Ocean	Pacificum, el retorno al océano	Mariana Tschudi	Rodolfo Salas, José Canziani, Yuri Hooker, Belén Alcorta	Documentary	
La paisana Jacinta en búsqueda de Wasaberto		Adolfo Aguilar		Comedy	
The Pink House	La casa rosada	Palito Ortega Matute	José Luis Adrianzen, Ricardo Bromley, Shantall Lozano, Camila Mac Lennan	Thriller, Drama	
Once machos		Aldo Miyashiro		Sports, Comedy	
Retablo		Álvaro Delgado-Aparicio		Drama	Winner – Best Film at 20th Havana Film Festival New York
Green River: The Time of the Yakurunas	Rio Verde: El tiempo de los Yakurunas	Álvaro Sarmiento, Diego Sarmiento		Documentary	
Rosa Chumbe		Jonatan Relayze	Liliana Trujillo, Cindy Díaz	Drama	Peruvian entry for the Best Foreign Language Film at the 90th Academy Awards
The Solar System	El sistema solar	Bacha Caravedo, Daniel Higashionna		Comedy-drama	
Somos Néctar		Coco Bravo		Comedy	
Tenerlo (Have It!)		Gianfranco Vegas	"Dizzy" Daniel Moorehead, Pedro Kay	Sports	Filmed in Alianza Lima
Wik		Rodrigo Moreno del Valle		Drama	
2018
¡Asu mare 3!		Jorge Ulloa	Carlos Alcántara Vilar, Emilia Drago, Andrés Salas, Anahí de Cárdenas, Ana Cecilia Natteri	Comedy	Top-grossing movie of 2018
Caiga quien caiga		Eduardo Guillot	Miguel Iza, Eduardo Camino, Javier Valdés, Karina Jordán, Kukuli Morante, Jackie Vásquez, José Miguel Arbulú, Gonzalo Molina, Alfonso Dibos, Milene Vásquez, Sandro Calderon, Diego Carlos Seyfarth, Marcello Rivera, Alejandra Guerra, Victor Prada, Ana Maria Estrada, Pietro Sibille, Claudio Calmet, Percy Williams Silva	Political thriller	Premiered on 28 August
Complex Cases	Casos complejos	Omar Forero		Thriller, Drama	
Los Cortadores de Sillar		Alfredo Benavides		Documentary	
Django: sangre de mi sangre		Aldo Salvini	Giovanni Ciccia, Aldo Miyashiro, Emanuel Soriano	Action	
Eternity	Wiñaypacha	Óscar Catacora	Vicente Catacora, Rosa Nina	Drama	Peruvian entry for the Best Foreign Language Film at the 91st Academy Awards
Friends in trouble	Amigos en apuros	Joel Calero & Lucho Cáceres	Lucho Cáceres, Christian Thorsen, Gustavo Bueno, Reynaldo Arenas, Cécica Bernasconi, Luciana Blomberg, Aldo Miyashiro, Milett Figueroa, Pold Gastelo & Magdyel Ugaz	Comedy	
La Herencia		John Mayta, Sandro Ventura		Documentary	
How to Get Over a Breakup	Soltera codiciada	Bruno Ascenzo, Joanna Lombardi	Gisela Ponce de León, Karina Jordán	Comedy	Premiered on 31 May
Locos de amor 2		Frank Pérez-Garland	Carlos Alcántara, Marco Zunino, Vanessa Saba	Romantic comedy, Musical	Premiered on 14 February
Margarita 2		Frank Pérez-Garland	Giovanni Ciccia, Francisca Aronsson, Melania Urbina, Cesar Ritter, Vanessa Saba, Maria Grazia Gamarra, Yvonne Frayssinet	Comedy	Premiered on 2 August
Next to You	A tu lado	Martin Casapía Casanova	Alessandra Fuller, Andrés Vílchez, Jalsen Santana, Fausto Mata, Joaquín Escobar, Guillermo Castañeda, Leslie Shaw, Joaquín Escobar, Cristian Rivero	Romantic comedy	Premiered on 1 March
Don't Call Me Spinster	No me digas solterona	Ani Alva Helfer	Patricia Barreto, Angélica Aragón, Diego Carlos Seyfarth, Marisol Aguirre	Comedy	Premiered on 29 March
¡Qué difícil es amar!		David Ames	Diego Bertie, Milett Figueroa, Oscar López Arias, Valentín Prado, Daniela Sarfati	Romantic comedy	Premiered on 1 February
La sacamos del estadio		Oswaldo Aldana	Emanuel Soriano, Macla Yamada, Bruno Odar, Andrea Luna, Javier Dulzaidas, Nicolás Fantinato, Marisela Puicón, José Dammert	Sports comedy	Premiered on 7 June
Utopia	Utopía, la película	Gino Tassara, Jorge Vilela	Renzo Schuller, Rossana Fernández-Maldonado, Gianfranco Brero, Marisa Minetti	Drama	Premiered on 27 September
Southern Winds	Vientos del sur	Franco García		Drama	
The Weakling's Handbook	El manual del pisado	Carlitos Landeo	Manolo Rojas, Natalia Málaga, Leslie Shaw, Sergio Galliani, Airam Galliani, Susan León, Mónica Domínguez, Carlos Thornton, Ámparo Brambilla, Emilio Montero, Mariana Sábato, Hernán Romero, Cecilia Tosso,	Comedy	Premiered on 12 April
Yuli		Christian Carrasco	Marisela Puicón, Julián Legaspi, Giovanna Valcárcel, Jorge ‘Coco’ Gutiérrez, Alexander Geks, Aaron Alejandro Silverstone, Alan Castillo, Gustavo Cerrón, Fernanda Pacheco, Daniel Ceron, Luis Rodríguez	Science Fiction, Action	Premiered on 11 October
2019
Cinema Express		Renzo Leyva			
Exchanged	Intercambiadas	Daniel Vega		Comedy	
Frontera Azul		Jorge Carmona, Tito Köster		Documentary	
Paradise Hotel	Hotel Paraíso	Daniel Rehder	Kareem Pizarro, Jely Reátegui, Marco Zunino, Francisca Aronsson	Comedy	
Identidad		José Carlos García, Carlos Granda		Documentary	
Is He My Girlfriend?	¿Mi novia es él?	Coco Bravo	Gregorio Pernía, Melissa Paredes, Edwin Sierra	Comedy	
Javier's Passion	La pasión de Javier	Eduardo Guillot		Biopic, Dram	
Tamarind Juice	Jugo de tamarindo	Julio Andrade	Julio Andrade, Karen Dejo, Leslie Stewart, Gerardo Zamora	Comedy	
Lina from Lima	Lina de Lima	María Paz González	Magaly Solier, Emilia Ossandon, Herode Joseph, Betty Villalta, Exequiel Alvear, James González, Cecilia Cartasegna, Edgardo Castro, Javiera Contador, Sebastián Brahm, Alberto Tenorio, Domitila Castillo, Ingrid Cevallos, Miguel Perea, Ítalo Suárez, Brian Montalvo, Diego Olivares, Ricardo León, Camilo Toro, Catalina Aros, Geraldine Raud, Félix Acosta, Liliana Meza	Drama	An international co-production with Chile and Argentina Winner – Best Chilean Feature Film & Héctor Ríos Award – Best Direction of Photography at the Valdivia International Film Festival Nominated – Best Ibero-American Film at the Mar del Plata International Film Festival Winner – Best Actress for Magaly Solier at the Chilean Film Festival Winner – Best Art Direction, Best Male Cast & Best Actress for Magaly Solier at the Quilpué Chilean Film Festival Winner – Best Film in co-production with Argentina at the Argentinean Film Critics Association Awards
Long Distance	Larga distancia	Franco Finocchiaro	Denisse Arreguí, Valquiria Huerta, Miguel Iza, Ximena Palomino, Fiorella Pennano, Diego Pérez	Comedy-drama	Commercially released on 20 January 2022 in Peruvian theaters
Norte		Fabrizio Aguilar		Drama	
Once machos 2		Aldo Miyashiro	Aldo Miyashiro, Pietro Sibille, André Silva, Cristian Rivero	Comedy	Premiered on 14 February
La peor de mis bodas 2		Adolfo Aguilar	Maricarmen Marín, Gabriel Soto, Laura Zapata, Carlos Casella	Comedy	Premiered on 1 January Sequel to the 2016 Peruvian film La peor de mis bodas
Píxeles de familia		Gerardo Ruiz Miñán	Paul Vega, Sergio Gjurinovic, Yvonne Frayssinet, Wendy Vásquez, Lizet Chávez	Drama	Premiered on 10 October
Prueba de Fondo		Oscar Bermeo, Christian Acuña		Documentary	
Rapto		Frank Pérez-Garland	Stefano Salvini, Osmar Núñez, Alejandro Holguín, Gustavo Bueno, Sandro Calderón, Iván Chávez, Giovanni Ciccia, Martha Figueroa, Julia Thays, Maria Fernanda Valera, Alicia Mercado	Mystery, Thriller	Premiered on 7 March
Recontraloca		Giovanni Ciccia	Gianella Neyra, Rebeca Escribens, Paul Vega, Santiago Suárez, Chiara Pinasco, Nicolás Galindo, Rossana Fernández Maldonado, Franco Cabrera, Giovanni Ciccia, Alessandra Fuller	Comedy	
The Revolution and the Land	La revolución y la tierra	Gonzalo Benavente Secco		Documentary	
Sebastina: The Curse	Sebastiana: La maldición	Augusto Tamayo San Román	Silvana Cañote, Luciana Blomberg, Alicia Mercado, Andrea Luna, Paola Nanino, André Silva, Stefano Salvini, Diego Carlos Seyfarth, Gianfranco Brero, Bertha Pancorvo, Valentina Saba, Katerina D'Onofrio, Germán Gonzales, Lula Toledo	Supernatural horror	Premiered on October 24
Song Without a Name	Canción sin nombre	Melina León	Lidia Quipse, Lucio Rojas, Maykol Hernández, Pamela Mendoza, Tommy Párraga	Drama	Melina León becomes first Peruvian female director to be selected at the Cannes Film Festival Peruvian entry for the Best International Feature Film at the 93rd Academy Awards
Three Kids and a Dad	Papá x Tres	Sandro Ventura Mantilla		Comedy	
What Couples Do	Los helechos – Enredos de parejas	Antolín Prieto	Nuria Frigola Torrent, Miguel Vargas, Fernanda Gutiérrez, Pedro Kanashiro, Mariana Palau, Fernando Neyra, Pold Gastello	Comedy-drama	
Youtuber Dad	Papá Youtuber	Fernando Villarán	Carlos Carlin, Gianella Neyra, Thiago Bejar, Valentina Izquierdo, Manuel Gold, Analía Laos, Pelo Madueño, Ebelín Ortiz, Rodrigo Palacios, Jely Reátegui, Vanessa Saba	Comedy	
Yuraq				Horror	

== 2020s ==
Title	Original title	Director	Cast	Genre	Notes
2020
Los Campeones		Alex Hidalgo		Comedy	
La Cosa		Álvaro Velarde		Comedy	
De patitas a la calle		Carltos Landeo		Fantasy, Comedy	
Drag Invasion	Invasión Drag	Alberto Castro	Tany de la Riva, Georgia Hart, Sandra Picciotti, Renzo Sáenz, Oliver Ramos, Carola Gutiérrez	Documentary	Premiered on 19 November at the 6th University of Lima Film Week It was commercially released on 23 June 2022, in Peruvian theaters
Locos de amor 3		Frank Pérez-Garland	Katia Condos, Ebelin Ortiz, Patricia Portocarrero	Musical, Romantic comedy	Premiered on 13 February
The Lyosacks Movie		Alvaro Calmet	Alvaro Calmet, Jon Bailey, Yong Yea, Aaron Nield, Julian Dorra, Emily Mack, Shady Dorra, Lizel Jackson, Maks Baumann, Benny Bostros, Carrie Jonston, Anthony Dimascio	Adventure, Comedy, Science fiction	Premiered on 6 July on YouTube Based on Calmet's web series of the same name
Neighborhood Cinemas	Cines de video	Wari Gálvez Rivas		Documentary	Premiered on 26 September at the 11th Al Este Film Festival
Perpetual Person	Persona perpetua	Javier Bellido Valdivia	Amadea Cárdenas Cuba, Nancy Valdivia Cárdenas, Catalina Zevallos Antahuara, Anghelo Mancco Hurtado, Javier Bellido Valdivia	Documentary	It had its world premiere on 7 December at the 18th Doclisboa International Film Festival Nominated – Best Documentary Feature Film at the 8th Trujillo Film Festival Nominated – Best Documentary at the 13th APRECI Awards
Powerful Chief	Manco Cápac	Henry Vallejo		Drama	Peruvian entry for the Best International Feature Film at the 94th Academy Awards Winner – Best Peruvian Feature Film, Best Screenplay & Best Actor for Jesús Luque Colque at the 12st APRECI Awards
The Restoration	La restauración	Alonso Llosa	Paul Vega, Atilia Boschetti, Delfina Paredes, Pietro Sibille, Muki Sabogal	Comedy	
Romulo & Julita	Rómulo y Julita	Daniel Martín Rodríguez	Mónica Sánchez, Miguel Iza, Mayella Lloclla, Pietro Sibille	Romantic comedy	
Samichay, In Search of Happiness	Samichay, en busca de la felicidad	Mauricio Franco Tosso	Amiel Cayo Coaquira, Agustina Aurelia Cougar Ccallo	Drama	
The Seal: Number 10 from the Street	La Foquita: El 10 de la calle	Martin Casapía Casanova	Jean Franco Sánchez, Ray del Castillo, Juan Carlos Rey de Castro,	Biopic, Drama	
Sí, mi amor		Pedro Flores Maldonado		Romantic comedy	
The Silence of the River	El Silencio del Río	Francesca Canepa		Short Film, Documentary	Short film premiered in Berlín Winner of the Excellence Award at the Busan Festival
The Song of the Butterflies	El canto de las mariposas	Núria Frigola Torrent	Rember Yahuarcani López, Nereida López, Santiago Yahuarcani, Martha López	Documentary	Premiered on 28 May at the Hot Docs Canadian International Documentary Festival Nominated – Best Documentary at the 24th Lima Film Festival Winner – Best Documentary at the 35th Guaralajara International Film Festival Released on 30 August 2021, on PBS
Time and Silence	El tiempo y el silencio	Alonso Izaguirre	Manuel Siles, Diana Collazos, Oswaldo Salas, Oscar Ludeña, Ichi Terukina, Ricardo Velásquez, Jaydda Díaz	Drama	Nominated – Best Peruvian Feature Film & Best Actress for Diana Collazos at the 12st APRECI Awards Nominated – Best Fiction Film at the 8th Trujillo Film Festival
Theoretically, a paranoid conspiratorial phone call		Jorge L. Villacorta	Jorge Villacorta	Espionage, Psychological Warfare, Comedy	Feature film, 92 minutes Inspired by the Annex "B" to the U.S. Doctrinal Program, PSB D-33, 29 June 1953, declassified on 19 December 2013. Review Symposium paper Symposium paper video
Wake Show	Función velorio	Aldo Miyashiro	Reynaldo Arenas, Ximena Arroyo, Haysen Percovich, Manuel Calderón, Virginia Mayo, Diego Pérez, Christopher Gaona, Lucho Cáceres, Emilram Cossío, Tati Alcántara	Drama	Nominated – Narrative Feature Award at the 27th Austin Film Festival Winner – Best Narrative Feature – First Prize at the 39th Flickers’ Rhode Island International Film Festival
We're All Sailors	Todos somos marineros	Miguel Angel Moulet	Andrey Sladkov, Ravil Sadreev, Julia Thays, Gonzalo Vargas Vilela, Julia Thays, Gonzalo Alejandro Vargas, Beto Benites	Drama	
El Zorzalito		Edgard Flores		Social drama	
2021
1214: No tememos a los cobardes		Ernesto Carlín, Hernán Hurtado		Documentary	
About Everything There Is to Know	De todas las cosas que se han de saber	Sofía Velásquez Núñez		Documentary	Winner – National Feature Film Competition Award at the 7th University of Lima Film Week Nominated – Latin American Competition Award at the 36th Mar del Plata International Film Festival Winner – Latin American Competition – Special Mention at the 36th Mar del Plata International Film Festival Nominated – Silver Biznaga for Best Documentary at the 25th Málaga Film Festival
Ainbo: Spirit of the Amazon	Ainbo: El espíritu del Amazonas	José Zelada		Adventure comedy	Amazon mythology film set in Peruvian Amazonia
Autoerotic	Autoerótica	Andrea Hoyos	Rafaella Mey, Micaela Céspedes, Wendy Vásquez, María del Carmen Gutiérrez, Beto Benites, Renato Rueda, César Ritter	Coming-of-age, Drama	Nominated – Best Picture at the 25th Lima Film Festival Winner – First Special Mention as part of Fiction Competition at the 25th Lima Film Festival
Bruma		José Balado		Documentary	Premiered on 14 October at DocsMx
Complot Internacional Antilatinoamericano		Jorge L. Villacorta	Jorge Villacorta, Jorge Villacorta,	Espionage, Psychological Warfare, Comedy, Science Friction	Feature film, 1 hour 32 minutes 02 seconds. Inspired by the Operation Condor (Plan Condor) (beginning in 1968). Review
Complot Internacional Antilatinoamericano 2K		Jorge L. Villacorta	Jorge Villacorta, Jorge Villacorta,	Espionage, Psychological Warfare, Comedy, Science Friction	Feature film, 1 hour 36 minutes 36 seconds. Inspired by the Project Camelot, Methods for Predicting and Influencing Social Change and Internal War Potential (Proyecto Camelot, Métodos para predecir e influir el cambio social y el potencial interno de guerra) (beginning in 1964).
Complot Internacional Antilatinoamericano KKKK		Jorge L. Villacorta	Jorge Villacorta, Jorge Villacorta,	Espionage, Psychological Warfare, Comedy, Science Friction	Feature film, 1 hour 49 minutes 09 seconds. Inspired by the Report of the Senate Select Committee on Intelligence. Committee Study of the Central Intelligence Agency's Detention and Interrogation Program together with foreword by Chairman Feinstein and Additional and Minority Views. 9 December 2014. Ordered to be printed. Also inspired by the Senate Intelligence Committee Study on CIA Detention and Interrogation Program.
Doblemente embarazada		Eduardo Mendoza de Echave	Carolina Cano, Andrés Wiese, Nicolás Galindo, Daniela Camaiora	Comedy	Remake of the 2019 Mexican film Doblemente embarazada
Fever Dream	Distancia de rescate	Claudia Llosa	María Valverde, Dolores Fonzi, German Palacios, Guillermo Pfening, Emilio Vodanovich, Guillermina Sorribes Liotta, Marcelo Michinaux, Cristina Banegas	Psychological thriller	
Hatun Phaqcha, The Healing Land	Hatun Phaqcha, tierra sana	Delia Ackerman		Documentary	Premiered in August 2021 in the Made in Peru section at the 25th Lima Film Festival It was commercially released on 17 February 2022, in Peruvian theaters Winner – Audience Award at the 25th Lima Film Festival Winner – PUCP Community Award for Made in Peru Best Film at the 25th Lima Film Festival Winner – Environment Award at the Toronto Women Film Festival Winner – Latin American Documentaries at the International Environmental Film Festival Nominated – Best Documentary at the 13th APRECI Awards Winner – Cinema Cocina at the 26th Málaga Film Festival
The House of Snails	La casa del caracol	Macarena Astorga	Javier Rey, Paz Vega, Luna Fulgencio, Ava Salazar, Norma Martínez, Carlos Alcántara	Psychological thriller	
LXI (61)		Rodrigo Moreno del Valle	Javier Saavedra, Cynthia Moreno, Rodrigo Palacios, Sebastián Rubio	Drama	Nominated – Best Picture at the 25th Lima Film Festival Winner – Special Jury Prize – Fiction Feature Film at the Trujillo Film Festival Nominated – Best Peruvian Feature Film & Best Supporting Actor for Sebastián Rubio at the 13rd APRECI Awards Winner – Best Supporting Actor for Rodrigo Palacios, Best Supporting Actress for Cynthia Moreno & Best Screenplay at the 13rd APRECI Awards
Medias hermanas		Ani Alva Helfer	Gianella Neyra, Magdyel Ugaz, Tiago Correa, Leonardo Torres Vilar, Nacho Di Marco, Thiago Vernal, Miguel Dávalos	Comedy	Premiered on 18 November
Moon Heart	El corazón de la luna	Aldo Salvini	Haydeé Cáceres	Science fiction, Drama	Winner – Best film at the Sci-Fi London Festival Winner – Best Actress for Haydeé Cáceres at the Sydney Science Fiction Film Festival Winner – Best Actress for Haydeé Cáceres at Fantaspoa, the fantastic film festival in Porto Alegre (Brazil) Winner – Best Actress for Haydeé Cáceres at the 47th Boston Science Fiction Film Festival Peruvian entry for the Best International Feature Film at the 95th Academy Awards
Our (Perfect) Xmas Retreat	El refugio	Macarena Astorga	Loles León, Leo Harlem, María Barranco, David Guapo, Sara Sálamo, Carlos Alcántara, Mariam Hernández, Antonio Dechent, Luna Fulgencio, Rubén Fulgencio, Marco Ezcurdia	Christmas, Comedy	An international co-production with Spain, Mexico and Argentina
Pakucha		Tito Catacora		Documentary	Winner - Best Documentary at the 26th Lima Film Festival Winner - Ministry of Culture Jury Award for Best Peruvian Film - Honorable Mention at the 26th Lima Film Festival
La pasión artesanal		Roberto Barba		Documentary	Premiered on 21 October at Cineaparte Released on 19 March 2022, in the Cinema Cocina section of the 25th Málaga Film Festival.
The Shape of Things to Come	Tiempos futuros	Víctor Checa	Fernando Bacilio, Lorenzo Molina, Jeremi Garcia, Paulina Bazan, José Flores	Science fiction, Drama	Special recognition of the jury of the Beijing International Film Festival, in China
Theoretically, a much more paranoid conspiratorial phone call		Jorge L. Villacorta	Jorge Villacorta, Michael Lake	Espionage, Psychological Warfare, Horror, Comedy	Feature film, 1 hour 52 minutes 08 seconds.
Theoretically, an even more paranoid conspiratorial phone call		Jorge L. Villacorta	Jorge Villacorta	Espionage, Psychological Warfare, Adventure, Comedy, Mystery	Feature film, 88 minutes. Inspired by the US Army/Training and Doctrine Command (TRADOC)'s Human Terrain System (HTS) (February 2007 – 30 September 2014).
Theoretically, an even much more paranoid conspiratorial phone call		Jorge L. Villacorta	Jorge Villacorta	Science Fiction, Espionage, Psychological Warfare, Thriller, Horror, Comedy.	Feature film, 84 minutes 37 seconds. Inspired by the way Andrei Romanovich Chikatilo, Russian serial killer who murdered 53 people, was interrogated. Also, inspired by Public Law 107-56 26 Oct. 2001 Uniting and Strengthening America By Providing Appropriate Tools Required to Intercept and Obstruct Terrorism (USA PATRIOT) Act of 2001. Locations: El Callao, Peru. Review
A World for Julius	Un mundo para Julius	Rossana Díaz Costa	Rodrigo Barba, ugusto Linare, Fiorella de Ferrari, Mayella Loclla, Nacho Fresnada,	Drama	Based on the homonymous book by Alfredo Bryce Echenique
Historias de Perusalem	Stories of Perusalem	Fermin Tangüis Figueroa	Raul Montañez, Homero Cristalli, Ricardo Delgado	Documentary	
Xennials		Paula Chávez		Documentary	Premiered in January at the Noida International Film Festival (India)
2022
Acuérdate de mí		Sebastian García	Alec Chaparro, Liz Navarro, Karin Morris, Roberto Bedoya, Techi Cornejo, Carlos Vertiz	Romantic comedy	It had its commercial premiere on 14 February 2024, in Peruvian theaters
Antonia	Antonia en la vida	Natalia Rojas Gamarra	Antonia Moreno, Paulina Bazán	Drama	Premiered on 6 August in the Made in Peru section at the 26th Lima Film Festival
Atrapado en mi mente		Richard Santaria Romero	Andrea Luna, Sebastián Stimman	Psychological thriller	It had its commercial premiere on 20 July 2023, in Peruvian theaters
Atrapado, luchando por un sueño		Pedro Ramírez Ugarte	Vincenzo Leonardi, Christopher Moreno, Desirée Durán, Daniella Arroyo	Drama	Premiered on 15 September
La banda presidencial		Eduardo Mendoza de Echave	Emilram Cossio, Giovanni Ciccia, Andrés Salas, Haysen Percovich, Christian Ysla	Political comedy, Satire, Crime	Premiered on 22 September
Bantamweight	Peso Gallo	Hans Matos Cámac	Max Huiza, Melvin Quijada, Rosalía Clemente, Ángela Huamán, Benjamín Baltazar, Gilmer Briceño	Sports, Drama	Premiered on 8 September Winner – Best Fiction Feature Film at the 10th Trujillo Film Festival Winner – Special Mention for Acting Performance for Rosalía Clemente Tacza
Cosas de amigos		Giovanni Ciccia	Rodrigo Sánchez Patiño, Bruno Ascenzo, Óscar López Arias, Gisela Ponce de León, Emilia Drago, Miguel Dávalos	Comedy	Premiered on 21 July
La decisión de Amelia		Francisco José Lombardi	Mayella Lloclla, Gustavo Bueno, Paul Vega, Stephany Orúe, Haydeé Cáceres, Martin Martinez	Drama	Premiered on 6 August in Galas section at the 26th Lima Film Festival It had its commercial premiere on 31 August 2023, in Peruvian theaters
Don't Call Me Spinster 2	No me digas solterona 2	Ani Alva Helfer	Patricia Barreto, André Silva	Comedy	Premiered on 14 April
Fever	Fiebre	Elisa Eliash	Lautaro Cantillana Teke, Nora Catalano, Macarena Teke, Néstor Cantillana, José Soza, Tita Iacobelli, Agatha Simunovic, Luciano Jadrievich, Gabriel Urzua, Paula Zuñiga, Paula Bravo, Camilo Egaña	Family, Fantasy	An international co-production with Chile and Brazil Based on the 2017 short film Un poco de fiebre by Elisa Eliash
Huesera: The Bone Woman	Huesera	Michelle Garza Cervera	Natalia Solián, Alfonso Dosal, Mayra Batalla, Mercedes Hernández, Sonia Couoh, Aida López	Body horror, Supernatural	Winner – Best New Narrative Director & Nora Ephron awards at the 2022 Tribeca Festival
Impregnated	Encintados	Gianfranco Quattrini	Magdyel Ugaz, Ximena Palomino, Benjamín Amadeo	Romantic comedy	Premiered on 26 May
In Between Invented Trees	Entre estos árboles que he inventado	Martín Rebaza Ponce de León	Maritza Sáenz, Allmendra Ibañez, Fernando Bacilio, Humberto Arancibia	Drama	
The Invisible Girl	La pampa	Dorian Fernández-Moris	Fernando Bacilio, Luz Pinedo, Mayella Lloclla, Pamela Lloclla, Oscar Carrillo, Alain Salinas, Sylvia Majo, Gonzalo Molina, Antonieta Pari	Thriller, Drama	Winner – Best Foreign Film at the Gramado Film Festival Winner – Special Jury Award – Art Direction at the Gramado Film Festival Winner – Best Direction Photography at the Calzada de Calatrava International Film Festival Winner – Best Fiction Film at the Trujillo Film Festival Winner – Special Jury Award for Best Performance at the Trujillo Film Festival
Irresistible Seducers	Seductores irresistibles	Jorge E. Velarde & Rodrigo Viaggio	Américo Zúñiga, Arlees Mellet, Connie Chaparro, Haydee Caceres, Hernán Romero, Ingrid Altamirano, Issa Ringgold, Jean Franco Vértiz, Jesús Neyra, José Dammert, Karol de la Borda, Kukulí Morante, Laura Borlini, Mafe Valega, Paloma Yerovi, Rodrigo Viaggio, Vania Accinelli	Comedy	Premiered on 9 June
It's a Fat World	Mundo Gordo	Sandro Ventura	Micky Vargas, Daniela Feijoó, Renzo Schuller, Jesús Alzamora	Romantic comedy	Premiered on 1 September in Peruvian theaters Premiered on 19 September 2022 in Austin, Texas
Let's Tie the Knot, Honey!	¿Nos casamos? Sí, mi amor	Pedro Flores Maldonado	Yiddá Eslava, Julián Zucchi, Andrés Salas, Magdyel Ugaz, Pietro Sibille	Romantic comedy	Sequel to the 2020 Peruvian film Sí, mi amor Premiered on 3 February
Mirlo's Dance	La danza de Los Mirlos	Álvaro Luque	Los Mirlos, Jorge Rodríguez	Documentary	Premiered on 4 August at the 26th Lima Film Festival Winner – Best Documentary Feature Film at the 9th Trujillo Film Festival Winner – Cinema in Prisons Program Award – Special Mention at the 37th Mar del Plata International Film Festival Nominated – Best Documentary at the 14th APRECI Awards It was commercially released on 29 February 2024
The Monroy Affaire	El caso Monroy	Josué Méndez	Damián Alcázar, María Zubiri, Olivia Manrufo, Maryloly López, Grapa Paola, Liliana Trujillo, Lia Camilo, Wendy Vázquez	Black comedy, Tragicomedy	It had its commercial premiere on 5 October 2023, in Peruvian theaters
Pandemia C19		Mitchel Ramos Lomparte	Mitchel Ramos, María Timana, Gabriela Turpo, Irvin Palacios, Luis Pacush, Jesua Aliaga, Victor Mejía, Américo Zuñiga, Jhon Cortez, Traysi Sánchez, Moisés Quispe, Cyndrith Neyra, Arcadio Mendez Jr. Francia, Melanie Moreno, Rocío Roque, Rocío Angeles, Nicole Salazar, Luz Dueñas, Mariella Yarrow, Alfredo Vasquez, Eduardo Cano	Action, Drama, Martial arts, Thriller, Zombie	World premiere on 16 September in Casma, Ancash Released on 17 September in Joinnus
Un romance singular		Wesley Verástegui	Javiera Arnillas, Marina Kapoor, Santiago Cáceres	Romantic comedy	Premiered on 6 January
Operation Condor	La pena máxima	Michel Gómez	Emanuel Soriano, Augusto Mazzarelli, Denisse Dibós, Fiorella Pennano	Political thriller	Based on the homonymous book written by Santiago Roncagliolo Premiered on 25 August
Salir del clóset		Alberto Castro	Bruno García-Calderón, Josué Parodi, Paco Flores, Marcelo Cicala, Gino Lorenzo, Joaco Ahumada, Eduardo Villanueva, Lucho Mora, Iván Pérez, Omar Olivos	Documentary	Released as part of the National Selection of the Cinema Week of the University of Lima 2022. Premiered on 17 January 2023, in Peruvian theaters
She's Just Like Me	Igualita a mí	Felipe Martínez Amador	Carlos Alcántara, Daniela Camairoa, Andrea Luna, Renato Rueda, Anahí de Cardenas, Maju Mantilla, Malory Vargas, Melissa Paredes, Sonia Seminario	Comedy	Remake of the 2010 Argentine film Igualita a mí Premiered on 16 June
Sugar en aprietos		José Salinas	Alessandra Fuller, David Zepeda, Patricia Portocarrero, Yvonne Frayssinet, Maju Mantilla, Andrés Vílchez, Joaquín Escobar, Andrea Luna, Haydeé Cáceres, Olga Zumarán, Kukuli Morante, Valeria Piazza, Austin Palao, Ricardo Rondón, Tito Vega, Leslie Stewart, Javier Valdés, José Dammert, Matías Raygada, Mariano Ramírez	Comedy	Premiered on 6 October
The Truth of Xanaxtasia	La verdad de Xanaxtasia	Diego Muñoz & Ítalo Carrera	Xanaxtasia, Jely Reategui, Carlos Carlín, Renzo Schuller, Gisella Ponce de León, Fiorella Rodriguez, Mónica Torres, Jaime Choca Mandros, Anaí Padilla, Zagaladas, Maykol Show, Javiera Arnillas, TontaQueen, Percy Pls, Salandela, BlackVelour, Koky Belaunde, Marina Kapoor	Mockumentary	Premiered on 14 July via streaming on Joinnus
The Twelve Apostles	Los doce apóstoles	Jorge Marín	Javier Echevarría, Ghiis Araoz, Claudia Dammert, Hugo Salazar, Haydée Cáceres, Americo Zuñiga, Cecilia Tosso, Nicolás León, Luis Trivelli, Cecilia Monserrate, Kukuli Morante, Marisol Tobalina, Candela Showoman, Jorge Da Fieno	Action, Political thriller	Premiered on 28 July in Joinnus
Where's The Right Girl	Busco novia	Daniel Vega	César Ritter, Magdyel Ugaz, Vadhir Derbez, Fiorella Pennano, Gustavo Bueno, Grapa Paola	Comedy	Premiered on 18 November on Prime Video
Who Said Detox?	¿Quién dijo Detox?	Rosa María Santisteban	Luciana Blomberg, Jimena Lindo, Korina Rivadeneira, Maju Mantilla, Gachi Rivero, Andrés Vilchez, Francisco Andrade, Ximena Rodríguez	Comedy	Premiered on 10 March
Willaq Pirqa, the Cinema of My Village	Willaq Pirqa, el cine de mi pueblo	César Galindo	Víctor Acurio, Hermelinda Luján, Melisa Álvarez, Alder Yaurisaca	Comedy-drama	Won the Best Peruvian Film award at the 26th Lima Film Festival Premiered on 8 December
Without Saying Goodbye	Hasta que nos volvamos a encontrar	Bruno Ascenzo	Stephanie Cayo, Maxi Iglesias, Wendy Ramos, Jely Reategui, Nicolás Galindo, Vicente Vergara, Renata Flores, Muki Sabogal, Mayella Lloclla, Rodrigo Palacios, Anaí Padilla, Carlos Carlín, Ahmed Shawky Shaheen, Amiel Cayo, Alberick García, Jaime Cruz Juscamaita	Romantic comedy	Premiered worldwide on 18 March on Netflix
2023
Alone Together	Compartespacios	Carmen Rojas Gamarra	Tania Del Pilar, Daniela Trucíos, Daniel Cano	Drama	Premiered on 11 October as part of the 30th Valdivia International Film Festival Nominated – Peruvian Competition – Best Film at the 28th Lima Film Festival Winner – Best Fiction Feature Film at the 11th Trujillo Film Festival
The Art of Freedom	El Arte de la LKibertad	Fermin Tangüis Figueroa	Patricia Bellatin	Documentary	
¡Asu mare! Los amigos		Carlos Alcántara	Andrés Salas, Franco Cabrera, Emilram Cossio, Miguel Vergara	Comedy	Premiered on 9 February
Classroom 8	Aula 8	Héctor Gálvez	Víctor Zapata Farro	Documentary	Premiered on 12 August as part of the Documentary competition at the 27th Lima Film Festival Nominated – Best Documentary at the 27th Lima Film Festival Nominated – Best Documentary at the 15th APRECI Awards
Diógenes		Leonardo Barbuy La Torre	Gisela Yupa, Cleiner Yupa, Jorge Pomacanchari	Drama	Premiered on 14 March as part of the 26th Málaga Film Festival, in competition within the Zonazine section Premiered on 15 August as part of the Fiction competition at the 27th Lima Film Festival
East Germany	Alemania Oriental	Alonso Izaguirre	Diana Daf Collazos, Yamile Caparó Cuba, Flavio López, Luccio Ramos, Pilar Nuñez	Drama	Premiered on 19 October at the 4th Lima Alterna International Film Festival Winner – Best Film in the Peruvian Competition at the 4th Lima Alterna International Film Festival Nominated – Best Fiction Feature Film at the 10th Trujillo Film Festival
The Erection of Toribio Bardelli	La erección de Toribio Bardelli	Adrián Saba	Gustavo Bueno, Gisela Ponce de León, Rodrigo Sánchez Patiño, Michele Abascal, Lucélia Santos	Black comedy, Tragicomedy	Peruvian entry for the Best International Feature Film at the 96th Academy Awards Premiered on 15 August as part of the Fiction competition at the 27th Lima Film Festival It had its commercial premiere on 26 October
The Four Altars	Los cuatro altares	Alonso del Río	Silke Klein, Damián Alcázar, Magaly Solier, Diana Quijano, Valentina Vargas, Eivaut Rischen	Drama	Premiered on 21 September
A Giant Adventure	Una aventura gigante	Eduardo Schuldt	Gina Yangali, Merly Morello, Gustavo Bueno, Yiddá Eslava, Reynaldo Arenas, Paul Martin, Denisse Dibós, Gustavo Mayer, Eike Schuldt	Adventure, Comedy, Fantasy	Premiered on 12 January
Grompes, Curumi and The Papaya Girl	Grompes, Curumí y la niña de la papaya	Fernando Valdivia	Grompes Puricho, Clara Belisario Nascimento, Amrnado Puricho, Margarita Puricho, Segundina Puricho, Roberto Puricho	Documentary	Premiered on 19 October at the 10th Trujillo Film Festival
Hablando huevadas: ¡Hijo de...!		Eduardo Pinto	Jorge Luna, Ricardo Mendoza, Izan Alcázar, Emilram Cossío, Tabata Fernández, Kailani Pinedo, Amil Mikati, Paco Caparó, Mayra Goñi, Alonso Acuña, Gerardo Morales, Sebastián Abad, Joseph Argumedo, Gino Bonatti, Gino Pesaressi, Gonzalo «Goncho» Iglesias, Pablo Saldarriaga, Alonso Cano, Cheli Vera, Abigail Fernández Santillán, Santiago Valencoso, Victoria Cornejo Echevarría, Sergio Peña	Comedy	Premiered 21 December exclusively in Cineplanet theaters
How to Deal With a Heartbreak	Soltera codiciada 2	Joanna Lombardi	Gisela Ponce de León, Karina Jordán, Jely Reátegui, Christopher von Uckermann, Carlos Carlín, Jason Day, Andrés Salas, Salvador del Solar, Norma Martínez, Ana María Orozco	Comedy	Sequel to the 2018 film How to Get Over a Breakup Premiered on 6 July
El huatrila		Roberto Flores Muñoz	Fernando Moya Tirado, Amiel Cayo, Thiago Amaro, Enzo Meloni, José Miguel Argüelles	Drama	Premiered on 13 September at the 21st Vancouver Latin American Film Festival Winner – Breakthrough Actor for Fernando Moya at the 2nd International Film Festival of the Province of Buenos Aires Winner – Special Mention from the Jury of the International Fiction Feature Film Competition at the 2nd International Film Festival of the Province of Buenos Aires Winner – First honorable mention SIGNIS Argentina at the 2nd International Film Festival of the Province of Buenos Aires Winner – Best Film in the Peruvian Competition at the 5th Lima Alterna International Film Festival
Isla Bonita		Ani Alva Helfer	Patricia Barreto, Saskia Bernaola, Emilia Drago, César Ritter, Wales Pana, Alejandro Villagomez, Patricia Portocarrero, Herman Romero, Adriana Campos Salazar, Connie Joana, Dorian Fernández-Moris, Carlos León, Armando Machuca, Ruben Manrique, Chichi Fernández Moris, Manuel Rafa, Luthiana Fernández Moris, Diego Sánchez, Llorch Sánchez	Comedy	Premiered on 30 November
Justicia para Alan		Ernesto Carlín	Rafael Correa, Álvaro Uribe, Julio María Sanguinetti, José Mujica	Documentary	Premiered on 20 April
Khaos		Dante Rubio Rodrigo	Dante Rubio Rodrigo, Isaías Saldaña, Thalía Díaz, Dayana Rivera, Esther Muñoz	Thriller	Premiered on 19 May at the Auditorium of the National University of Chota
The Last Laugh	Muerto de risa	Gonzalo Ladines	César Ritter, Gisela Ponce de León, Gianfranco Brero, Giselle Collao, Daniel Menacho, Job Mansilla, Hernán Romero, Gabriela Velásquez	Comedy	Premiered on 11 August in the Made in Peru section at the 27th Lima Film Festival It had its commercial premiere on 4 January 2024
Lima Is Burning	Arde Lima	Alberto Castro	Tany de la Riva, Georgia Hart, La Langosta, Harmonik Minaj, Go Diva, Dark Princess, Alezz Andro, Ernesto Pimentel, Stacy Malibú, Tía Tula, Brit de Rapert, Cristina Corazón, La Funky, Petra, Cakutty	Documentary	It had its world premiere on 15 November at the 9th University of Lima Film Week It had its commercial premiere on 30 May 2024
The Linda James Case	El caso de Linda James	Kenny Roller López Curiniqui	Katiana Cordova, Key Benites, Enoc Sarmiento, Brenda Hernández, Juvitza Gutierrez, Claudia Gutierrez, Jhony Flores, Shirley Vasquéz, Carlos Quiros	Horror, Drama	Premiered on 11 May at the Municipal Theater of Nuevo Chimbote
Little Red Riding Wolf	De Caperucita a loba	Chus Gutiérrez	Marta González de Vega, Berto Romero, David Guapo, José Mota, Antonio Resines, Elena Irureta, Melania Urbina, Marco Zunino	Comedy	Premiered on 14 March at the 26th Málaga Film Festival Released on 5 April in Spanish theaters Released on 6 April in Peruvian theaters
Melgar es Arequipa, Campeones del 81		Wildo Ontiveros Aparicio		Documentary	Premiered on 23 March at the Cinemark Parque Lambrani, Arequipa
Milagros: An Extraordinary Bear	Milagros: Una osa extraordinaria	Eduardo Schuldt	Melany Segura, Nicole Valera, Ann Giraldo, Genaro Vásquez	Adventure, Comedy	Premiered on 27 July
The Most Feared Skin	La piel más temida	Joel Calero	Juana Burga, Amiel Cayo, Lucho Cáceres, María Luque, Katerina D'Onofrio	Drama	Premiered on 13 August in Galas section at the 27th Lima Film Festival Second film in the Calero's memory trilogy It was commercially released on 25 April 2024
Motherland	Kinra, el viaje de Atoqcha	Marco Panatonic	Raul Challa Casquina, Yuri Choa Tunquipa, Tomasa Sivincha Huamani, Marcosa Huamani Gonzales, Jorge Gonzales, Lizbeth Cabrera, Aurelio Quispe Cusihuaman, Dorotea Noa Ch’ecca, Soledad Secca Noa, Celso Aro Quispe	Drama	Winner – Golden Astor at the 38th Mar del Plata International Film Festival Nominated – Best Picture at the 28th Lima Film Festival Winner – Best Debut Film, International Critics' Jury Award for Best Film, Ministry of Culture Jury Award for Best Peruvian Film, CINETRAB Award for Best Fiction, APRECI Award for Best Film in Competition at the 28th Lima Film Festival Peruvian entry for the Best International Feature Film at the 98th Academy Awards It was commercially released on 14 November 2024
No vayan!!		Roger Asto León	Pablo 'Melcochita' Villanueva, Miguel Barraza	Comedy	Premiered on 23 November
Once Upon a Time in the Andes	Érase una vez en los Andes	Rómulo Sulca	Maribel Baldeón, Juan Cano, Agustina Alarcón, Felix Poma, Beto Pomacanchari, Moises Quichua	War, Romantic drama	Premiered on 27 November at the 54th International Film Festival of India It was commercially released on 5 September 2024
Open-Pit	Cielo abierto	Felipe Esparza Pérez	Dionicio Huaraccallo Idme, Moisés Jiménez Carbajal, Julio Carcausto Larito, Mayra Ferrer	Experimental, Docudrama	World premiere on 26 January at the 52nd International Film Festival Rotterdam as part of the Bright Future section Nominated – Audience Award at the 27th Lima Film Festival Winner – Ministry of Culture Jury Award for Best Peruvian Film & CINETRAB Award for Best Fiction Winner – Best Peruvian Fiction Feature Film at the 10th Huánuco Film Festival Nominated – Best International Documentary Film at the 41st Torino Film Festival
La peor de mis bodas 3		Adolfo Aguilar	Gabriel Soto, Laura Zapata, Maricarmen Marín, Ismael La Rosa, Milett Figueroa, Thiago Vernal, Carlos Casella, Francisco Cabrera, Canela China y Fernando Bakovic	Comedy	Sequel to the 2019 film La peor de mis bodas 2 Premiered on 27 July
Pirata's Road Trip	Una visa para Pirata	Gianfranco Alcántara		Documentary	
Pirú: A Golden Journey	Pirú: Un viaje de oro	Bismarck Rojas	Emmanuel Soriano, Andrés Salas, Mateo Castrejón, María Teresa Tello, Pedro Olórtegui, Laura Adrianzén, Eliseo Arrieta, Martín Martínez	Comedy-drama	Premiered on 5 October Winner – Best Fiction Feature Film Already Released at the 10th Huánuco Film Festival
Prohibido salir		Sandro Ventura	Anahí de Cárdenas, Renzo Schuller, Merly Morello, Facundo Vásquez de Velasco, Diego Lombardi, Laura Spoya, Maju Mantilla, Santiago Suárez, Luciana Fuster, Camucha Negrete, Fabiana Valcárcel, Fiorella Luna, David Carrillo, Liz Navarro, Alejandra Saba, Chiara Molina, Miguel Vargas	Comedy	Premiered on 14 September
Queens Without a Crown	Reinas sin corona	Gino Tassara	Alexandra Graña, Francisca Aronsson, Daniela Romo, Claudio Calmet, Rossana Fernández Maldonado, Katia Salazar, Kukuli Morante, Matías Raygada, Omar García, Julio Marcone, Mariano Ramírez, Elena Romero, Edith Tapia	Drama	Premiered on 9 March
Redemption	Redención	Miguel Barreda	Tatiana Astengo, John R. Dávila, Lucero López Ponce, Julia María Montesinos, Hugo Salazar	Drama	Premiered on 30 November
Reinaldo Cutipa		Oscar Gonzales Apaza	Jesús Luque Colque, Sylvia Majo, Danitza Pilco, Amiel Cayo, Gaby Huayhua	Drama	Premiered on 11 August in the Made in Peru section at the 27th Lima Film Festival It was commercially released on 22 February 2024, in Peruvian theaters
Revolution	Revolución	Nazareth Vega	Imanol Rivera, Luis Arroyo, Andrea Marla, Martha Rebaza, Adrián Mercado, Patricia Leyva Rodriguez, Lizeth Fernández	Coming-of-age, Drama	Premiered on 30 March, at the Mario Vargas Llosa House Museum, Arequipa
Shipibos Stories	Historias de shipibos	Omar Forero	Chelssy Fernández, Llimmy Márquez, Andry Azán, Luis Márquez	Drama	Premiered on 14 August as part of the Fiction competition at the 27th Lima Film Festival
Single, Married, Widowed, Divorced	Soltera, casada, viuda, divorciada	Ani Alva Helfer	Gianella Neyra, Katia Condos, Milene Vásquez, Patricia Portocarrero	Comedy, Road movie	Premiered on 20 April
Soy inocente		Pedro Flores Maldonado	Yiddá Eslava, Mariella Zanetti, Yarlo Ruiz, Rodolfo Carrión, Édgar Vivar, Pietro Sibille, Patricia Portocarrero, Eva Ayllón, Jorge Mena	Comedy mystery	Premiered on 19 January
Susy: A Vedette In The Congress	Susy: Una vedette en el Congreso	Liliana Alvarez	Alicia Mercado, Carlos Casella, Miluska Eskenazi, Carlos Victoria, Fernando Pasco Matos, Patricia Alquinta, Oscar López Arias, Baldomero Cáceres	Biopioc, Political comedy	Premiered on 28 October
Tayta Shanti		Hans Matos Camac	Julia Thays, Maria Tesoro Tapia, Melvin Quijada, Gianco Ponce, Laurens Flores, Marco Miranda, Benjamin Baltazar	Drama	Premiered on 14 August in the Made in Peru section at the 27th Lima Film Festival It was commercially released on 29 February 2024
They Shot the Piano Player	Dispararon al pianista	Fernando Trueba & Javier Mariscal	Jeff Goldblum	Docudrama	Nominated – Best Animation Film at the 29th Forqué Awards Nominated – Best Animated Film at the 16th Gaudí Awards Nominated – Best Animated Film at the 38th Goya Awards An international co-production with Spain, France, the Netherlands and Portugal
An Unexpected Marriage	Un matrimonio inesperado	Enrique Chimoy Sierra	Korina Rivadeneyra, Renzo Schuller, Fiorella Rodríguez, Guille Castañeda, Patricia Portocarrero, Miguel Vergara, Mabel Duclós y Giannina Alves	Romantic comedy	Premiered on 24 August
Women on the Edge	No me rompan	Azul Lombardía	Carla Peterson, Julieta Díaz, Salvador del Solar, Esteban Lamothe, Eugenia Guerty, Celina Font, Jazmín Rodríguez, Martin Garabal, Lalo Rotavaria, Brenda Kreizerman, Alfonso Tort, Cecilia Dopazo, Nancy Dupláa, Fito Páez, Claudia Fernández, Maitina De Marco, Nazarena Nobile	Comedy	Premiered on 21 September
Yana-Wara		Óscar Catacora & Tito Catacora	Luz Diana Mamami, Cecilio Quispe, Juan Choquehuanca, Irma D. Percca, José D. Calisaya	Mystery, Drama	Premiered on 13 August as part of the Fiction competition at the 27th Lima Film Festival It was commercially released in Peru on 4 April 2024. Peruvian entry for the Best International Feature Film at the 97th Academy Awards
The Year of the Tiger	El Año del Tigre	Yasser Michelén	Carlos Alcántara, Wendy Ramos, Frank Perozo, Gonzalo Torres, Andrea Sofia Pimentel, Jossi Martínez, Salvador Perez Martinez, Nashla Bogaert, Luinis Olaverria, Vicente Santos, Ana Maria Arias	Crime, Comedy	Premiered on 30 March
2024
The Banquet	El banquete	Michs Carbajal	Sandro Calderón, Natalia Montoya, Victor Acurio	Folk horror	Premiered on 15 October at the 5th Lima Alterna International Film Festival Nominated – Best Film in the Peruvian Competition at the 5th Lima Alterna International Film Festival
The Bastard Images	El archivo bastardo	Marianela Vega Oroza		Documentary	Premiered on 10 August at the 28th Lima Film Festival
Between Us	Entre nosotros	Martin Casapía Casanova	Alessandra Fuller, Diego Domínguez, Miguel Iza, Adrián Pedraja, Rosalinda Galán, Alfons Nieto, Ramón García, Anai Padilla	Mystery, Thriller	Premiered on 31 October
Carnaval		Gabriel Tejada & María José Osorio		Documentary	Premiered on 1 February
Chabuca		Jorge Carmona	Sergio Armasgo, Haydeé Cáceres, Norka Ramirez, Miguel Dávalos, Izan Alcázar, Gina Yangali, Brando Gallessi, Alejandro Villagomez, Gerson Del Carpio, Erick Elera	Biopic, Drama	Premiered on 11 April
Chuzalongo		Diego Ortuño	Bruno Odar, Wolframio Sinué, Aléx Cisneros, Fernando Bacilio, Mónica Mancero, Toa Tituaña, Yuyak Guitarra, Karla Gómez, Lenin Farinango, Matilde Lagos, Gael Ortuño, Sisa Farez	Folk horror	It was commercially released on November 6, 2025, in Peruvian theaters An international co-production with Ecuador, Canada and Spain
The Daughter of the Moon	Killapa Wawan	César Galindo	Carolina Luján, Magaly Solier, Reynaldo Arenas, Andrés “Chimango” Lares	Drama, Fantasy	Premiered on 9 August as part of the Peruvian Competition at the 28th Lima Film Festival It was commercially released on January 29, 2026, in Peruvian theaters
The Dream of Ariana	El sueño de Ariana	Evelyne Pegot-Ogier	Priscila Espinoza, Javier Valdés, Miguel Dávalos, Gabriel Gil, Brigitte Jouannet	Science fiction, Horror, Zombie	Premiered on 4 February at the Cultural Center of the Pontifical Catholic University of Peru
Family Album	Álbum de familia	Joel Calero	Emanuel Soriano, Camila Ferrer, María Fernanda Valera, Natalia Torres Vilar, Lucho Cáceres, Paulina Tacac, Rocío Limo, Mariano Ramirez, Marcela Duque, Melvin Quijada, Rodrigo Palacios, Katerina D'onofrio	Drama	Premiered on 10 August as part of the Peruvian Competition at the 28th Lima Film Festival Third and final installment of Calero's memory trilogy
The Gringa & the Musician	La Gringa y el Músico	Roberto Pazos		Documentary	Premiered on October 23 at the 3rd Amazon Film Festival
Iluminados		Ricardo Jhon	Jorge Fossati, José Carvallo, Aldo Corzo, Williams Riveros, Nelson Cabanillas, Matías Di Benedetto, Rodrigo Ureña, Piero Quispe, Martín Pérez Guedes, Horacio Calcaterra, Andy Polo, Edison Flores, Alex Valera, Manuel Barreto, Jean Ferrari	Documentary	Released via streaming on the Ticketmaster platform on 15 February It was commercially released on 24 February in Peruvian theaters
The Inheritance of Flora	La herencia de Flora	Augusto Tamayo San Román	Paloma Yerovi, Diego Bertie, Albertro Ísola, Gonzalo Revoredo, Joaquín de Orbegoso, Jimena Lindo, Vanessa Saba, Mónica Sánchez, Alberto Ísola, Bruno Odar, Gonzalo Revoredo	Biographical, Historical drama	Premiered on 7 March
Intercontinental		Salomón Pérez	Paris Pesantes, Sol Arbulú, Tania Del Pilar, Joaquín Palomino, Patricia Rodríguez	Drama	World Premiered on October 26 at the 53rd Kyiv International Film Festival "Molodist" Nominated - Peruvian Competition for Best Film at the 29th Lima Film Festival
The Legend of the Last Inca	Los indomables	Tito Catacora	Edwin F. Riva, Maribet Berrocal, Diego Alonzo Aguilar, Amiel Cayo, Fernando Ichuta, Jean L. Jarama Sylvia Majo, Francisco F. Torres, Carlos Victoria, Oscar R. Yepez	Historical drama	Premiered on 10 August as part of the Peruvian Competition at the 28th Lima Film Festival It was commercially released in Peru on 2 October 2025.
Live or Dead: The García File	Vivo o muerto: el expediente García	Jorge Prado	Stephany Orúe, Sergio Galliani, Merly Morello	Political thriller	Premiered on 18 April
Mimy & Tony: The Creation of a Dream	Mimy & Tony: La creación de un sueño	Tony Succar & Santiago Díaz	Mimy Succar, Tony Succar	Biopic, Documentary	Premiered on 12 September
Mission Kipi	Misión Kipi	Sonaly Tuesta	Walter Velásquez, Kipi the robot	Documentary	Premiered on 21 March
Mistura		Ricardo de Montreuil	Bárbara Mori, Christian Meier, Cesar Ballumbrosio, Stefano Meier, Juan Pablo Olyslager, Hermelinda Luján, Vanessa Saba, Marco Zunino, Luciana Di Laura, Junior Bejar, Priscila Espinoza, Jesús Aranda, Amaranta Kun, Sandro Calderón, Monserrat Brugué, Mariana Vilchez, Josue Subáustue, Susie Dragañac	Historical, Melodrama	Winner – Best Feature Narrative at the 25th Newport Beach Film Festival Winner – Best Feature Narrative Screenplay at the 25th Newport Beach Film Festival Winner – Best Feature Narrative Actress at the 25th Newport Beach Film Festival Winner – Best Narrative Feature at the Sarasota Film Festival It was commercially released on August 21, 2025, in Peruvian theaters
Night Has Come	Vino la noche	Paolo Tizón	Larry Morales, Terry Ramos, Jhordy Febre, Luis Huaman, Wanderley Yauri, Britman Machari, Hulber Ahuanari	Documentary	Nominated - PROXIMA Grand Prix at the 58th Karlovy Vary International Film Festival Winner - PROXIMA Special Jury Prize & FIPRESCI Award for PROXIMA Competition at the 58th Karlovy Vary International Film Festival Winner - Best Direction at the 28th Málaga Film Festival Nominated - Trophy Spondylus for Best Documentary at the 29th Lima Film Festival It was commercially released on November 13, 2025, in Peruvian theaters An international co-production with Spain and Mexico
Now There's 3 of Us? Sí, Mi Amor.	¿Ahora somos 3? Sí, mi amor	Pedro Flores Maldonado	Yiddá Eslava, Julián Zucchi, Andrés Salas, Magdyel Ugaz, Pietro Sibille	Romantic comedy	Premiered on 25 January
Quadrilateral	Cuadrilátero	Daniel Rodríguez Risco	Lizet Chávez, Amil Mikati, Gonzalo Molina, Valentina Saba, Fausto Molina, Gianfranco Brero	Black comedy, Comedy-drama, Thriller	Premiered on 16 March at the 38th Fribourg International Film Festival Winner – Special Jury Award at the 38th Fribourg International Film Festival Winner – Youth Jury Award COMUNDO at the 38th Fribourg International Film Festival Nominated – Best Film at the 33rd Biarritz Film Festival
Queens	Reinas	Klaudia Reynicke	Abril Gjurinovic, Luana Vega, Jimena Lindo, Gonzalo Molina, Susi Sánchez	Coming-of-age, Drama	Premiered in the World Cinema Dramatic Competition at the 2024 Sundance Film Festival on 22 January Swiss entry for the Best International Feature Film at the 97th Academy Awards
Ramón and Ramón	Ramón y Ramón	Salvador del Solar	Emanuel Soriano, Álvaro Cervantes, Dario Yazbek Bernal, Beto Benites, Carlos Mesta, Jely Reategui, Bruno Odar, Liliana Trujillo, Ebelin Ortiz, Lucho Ramírez, Julián Vargas	Drama	Nominated – Horizontes Latinos Award at the 72nd San Sebastian International Film Festival An international co-production with Spain and Uruguay
The Social Sin	El pecado social	Juan Carlos Goicochea	Roger Pinchi, William Pinchi, Pepe Andrews	Documentary	Premiered on 14 August in the Made in Peru section at the 28th Lima Film Festival Nominated – Peruvian Competition for Best Film at the 28th Lima Film Festival Winner – Special Jury Prize at the 28th Lima Film Festival
Stay Still	Quédate quieto	Joanna Lombardi	Hilton Gratelly, Hilda Curo, María Cristina Pérez, Melvin Quijada, Roxana Herrera	Docufiction	Premiered on 6 March at the 27th Málaga Film Festival Nominated – Best Documentary at the 27th Málaga Film Festival Nominated – Best Ibero-American Documentary Feature Film at the 39th Guadalajara International Film Festival
Sube a mi nube		Sergio Barrio	Silvana Cañote, Alessa Wichtel, Andrés Wiese, Christian Thorsen, Javier Delgiudice, Emilia Somocurcio, Juan Ignacio Di Marco, Gabriel González, Job Mansilla, Sergio Barrio, Pedro Sessarego, Marialola Arispe, Paco Varela	Melodrama	Premiered on 19 September Inspired by the life and tragedy surrounding the death of Mónica Santa María, presenter of the children's program Nubeluz
Tattoos in Memory	Tatuajes en la memoria	Luis Llosa	Gianfranco Bustios, Reynaldo Arenas, Milene Vazquez, Renata Flores, Christian Esquivel, Kenyi Nizama, Josué Cohello	Drama	Premiered on 29 August
Through Rocks and Clouds	Raíz	Franco García Becerra	Alberth Merma, Nely Huayta, Richard Taipe, José Merma, Deyvis Mayo, Rubén Huillca, Ruperta Condori	Drama	Premiered in the Generation Kplus section at the 74th Berlin International Film Festival on 19 February
Treasure Hunters	Cazatesoros	Héctor Valdez	Carlos Alcántara, Franco Cabrera, Nashla Bogaert, Sergio Galliani, Patricia Barreto, Víc Gómez, Yasser Michelén, Luinis Olaverria, Gerardo Mercedes, Ramón García, Luis Eduardo 'Beto' Franco, Saul Molina, Omar de la Cruz, Connie Chaparro, Patrick Gonzales, Attilia Boschetti	Action, Adventure, Comedy	Premiered on 28 November Released worldwide on Disney+
Vaguito		Alex Hidalgo	Julián Legaspi, Fernando Arze, Fiorella Rodríguez, Alexia Barnechea, Daniela Darcourt, Erick Del Aguila, Alex Hidalgo, Gina Palma, Américo Zuñiga	Drama	Premiered on 18 April Highest-grossing Peruvian film of 2024
Viejas amigas		Fernando Villarán	Ana Cecilia Natteri, Haydee Cáceres, Milena Alva, Patricia Frayssinet, Brigitte Jouannet, Jely Reátegui, Eduardo Camino, Gianfranco Berro, Aysha Gómez	Comedy	Premiered on 23 May Female spin-off of the film Viejos amigos
Welcome to Paradise	Bienvenidos al paraíso	Ani Alva Helfer	Tatiana Calmell, Andrés Salas, Vicente Santos, Franco Cabrera, Patricia Barreto, Yisney Lagrange, Katia Condos, Bruno Odar	Romantic comedy	Premiered on 28 March
Zafari		Mariana Rondón	Daniela Ramírez, Francisco Denis, Samantha Castillo, Varek La Rosa, Alí Rondón, Beto Benites, Claret Quea, Juan Carlos Colombo	Black comedy, Drama, Dystopia	Nominated – Horizontes Latinos Award at the 72nd San Sebastián International Film Festival Winner – FBAL Award for Feature Film from the French Union of Film Critics at the 33rd Biarritz Film Festival Nominated – Best International Film at the 29th International Film Festival of Kerala Nominated – Grand Prix at the 39th Fribourg International Film Festival Nominated – CineRebels Award at the 42nd Munich International Film Festival Nominated – Trophy Spondylus at the 29th Lima Film Festival Nominated – Chilean Film Competition for Best Film at the 21st Santiago International Film Festival An international co-production with Venezuela, Peru, Mexico, France, Chile, the Dominican Republic and Brazil It was commercially released on August 28, 2025, in Peruvian theaters
2025
1982		García JC	Jhordano Álvarez Huarcaya, Kailani Pinedo, Alaín Salinas, Julia Thays, Jesús Colque, Junior Néjar Roca, Alberick García, Dalia Ivanova, Francisco López, Manuel Molina, Atilia Reynaga Calderón, Julio Zúñiga - Chirápag, Sunilda Lima Pachuga, Máximo Guisado, Aurora Torrín Silvera, Jhosuel Yauris Cabezas, Hans Alendez Collao, Adriano Quintana Ramos, Giordano Oscco Vasquez, Johnny Quispe Laura, Amiel Cayo, Ciro Monzón Lara, Sebastian Rubio, Briscila Degregori, Yesica Espinosa, Rosa Reynaga Calderón, Juan Carlos Cespedes	Drama	
Alfa and Bravo	Alfa y Bravo	Aaron Otoya	Aaron Otoya, Johnny “Cholo Soy” Zare, Mateo Garrido Lecca, Brenda Matos, Santiago Suárez, Daniela Segura, 'Pantera' Zegarra, Emilram Cossio, Sibenito Osorio	Action, Comedy	Premiered on 16 October
Amor erizo		P.J. Ruiz	Patricia Barreto, Óscar Meza, Cindy Díaz, Alicia Mercado, Monserrat Brugué, Miguel Iza, Naima Luna, Patricia Frayssinet, Cecilia Rechkemmer, Carlos Vertiz	Comedy-drama, Romance	Premiered on 23 January
The Anatomy of the Horses	La anatomía de los caballos	Daniel Vidal Toche	Juan Quispe, Edith Ramos, Memé Nuñez, Felipe García, Adrián García, Gladis Conde	Drama, Magical realism	Nominated - PROXIMA Grand Prix at the 59th Karlovy Vary International Film Festival Nominated - Golden Giraldillo at the 22nd Seville European Film Festival Winner - Best Cinematography & Best Production Design at the 22nd Seville European Film Festival Nominated - Best Film at the 43rd Torino Film Festival Winner - FIPRESCI Award at the 43rd Torino Film Festival Nominated - Trophy Spondylus at the 30th Lima Film Festival An international co-production with Spain, Colombia and France
Ashes, the Movie	Uchpa, la película	Antonio Rodríguez Romaní	Fredy Ortiz	Biographical documentary	Premiered on 9 August at the 27th Lima Film Festival Nominated – Best Film in the Peruvian Competition at the 27th Lima Film Festival Premiered on 27 November
Astronaut	Astronauta	Paul Vega	Daniel Hendler, Angie Cepeda, Salvador del Solar, Gustavo Bueno, Marco Zunino, Fiorella Luna, Miguel Iza, Emilram Cossio, Claudia Berninzon, Bernardo Scarpella	Drama	Premiered on February 20, as the closing film of the 27th Punta del Este International Film Festival An international co-production with Colombia and Uruguay
The Black Room	La habitación negra	Pedro Flores Maldonado	Yiddá Eslava, Pietro Sibille, Mayra Couto, Claudio Calmet, Nanya Eslava, Ximena Galiano, 'El chico de las noticias'	Psychological horror, Thriller	Premiered on 30 October
Chavín De Huántar: The Rescue of the Century	Chavín de Huántar: el rescate del siglo	Diego de León	Rodrigo Sánchez Patiño, André Silva, Miguel Iza, Connie Chaparro, Sergio Galliani, Alfonso Dibós, Martín Martínez, Cristhian Esquivel, Baldomero Cáceres, Carlos Thornton, Nicolás Fantinato, Aníbal Lozano Herrera, Víctor Acurio, Sandro Calderón, Zoe Fernández	Action, Historical, Thriller	Premiered on 30 October
El Correcaminos		Barney Elliott	Emanuel Soriano, Oscar Meza, Ximena Palomino, Daniela Olaya, Emilram Cossío, Armando Machuca, Daniel Menacho, Elsa Olivero, Carlos Mesta, Víctor Prada, Junior Silva, Víctor Acurio, Lolo Balbin, Sandro Calderón, Rishabh Chadha, Iván Chávez, Alejandro Clavier, Bernabé D'arrigo, Joel Fuentes, César García, Leandro Mikati, Moisés Orbegoso, Facundo Posincovich, Claret Quea, Jely Reátegui, Rodrigo Reyes, Moisés Torres	Action, Comedy	Premiered on 6 November
Heart of the Wolf	El corazón del lobo	Francisco J. Lombardi	Víctor Acurio, Jared Vicente Sánchez, Silvana Goycochea, Paul Ramírez, Martín Martínez, José Fernández, Alberick García, Martín Velásquez Marvelat, Aníbal Lozano Herrera	Drama, War	Premiered on 9 August at the 29th Lima Film Festival Nominated - Best Latin American Film at the 40th Mar del Plata International Film Festival Nominated - Best Latin American Film at the 29th Málaga Film Festival Released on 2 October in Peruvian theaters
Kayara		Cesar Zelada	Naomi Serrano, Nate Begle, Charles Gonzales	Adventure	Premiered on 6 March
Locos de amor: mi primer amor		Miguel Valladares Vives	Brando Gallesi, Thiago Vernal, Arianna Fernández, Ray del Castillo, María Gracia Mora, Alexia Barnechea, Vasco Rodríguez, Monserrat Brugué, Job Mansilla, Quique Niza, Juan Ramos, Joaquin Camelo, Franco Piffaretti	Musical, Romantic comedy	Premiered on 27 June
The Memory of Butterflies	La memoria de las mariposas	Tatiana Fuentes Sadowski		Documentary	Premiered in the Forum section at the 75th Berlin International Film Festival on 15 February Winner – FIPRESCI Prize in the Forum section at the 75th Berlin International Film Festival Winner – Berlinale Documentary Film Award Special Mention at the 75th Berlin International Film Festival
My Storylof		Benjamín Doig Espinoza	Benjamín Doig Espinoza ,Isabela Fernández, Doménica del Pozo	Comedy-drama, Romance	Premiered on 25 September
Nanito		Guillermo Fernández Cano	Guido Calderón, Martha Rebaza, Roberto Palacios, María Eugenia Málaga, Andrés Luque	Romantic drama	Pemiered on 18 September
Los patos y las patas		Guillermo Castañeda	Diego Villarán, Francisca Aronsson, Gian Piero Díaz, Daniela Sarfati, Macla Yamada, Kareem Pizarro, Anaí Padilla, Christian Ysla Óscar Beltrán, Malú Menacho, Vasco Rodríguez, Emilram Cossio	Musical, Romantic comedy	Premiered on 18 September
Pucallpa la Europea		Santi Zegarra	Melissa Campo, Maxime Saint-Jean, Gabriela Pastor, Javiera Arnillas, La Uchulú, Lesly Quispe, Ángela Villón, Rebeca Ráez	Drama, Romance	Premiered on 1 September at the 22nd OutfestPerú Film Festival It was commercially released on July 9, 2026, in Peruvian theaters An international co-production with France
Punku		J. D. Fernández Molero	Marcelo Quino, Maritza Kategari, Ricardo Delgado, Hugo Sueldo	Drama, Mystery, Supernatural	Premiered in the Forum section at the 75th Berlin International Film Festival on 15 February
Sirenas		Nelson “Koko” Castillo	Lucy Bacigalupo, Diva Rivera, Estelita Ochoa, Cielo Lozano, Jasmín Martínez, Luis Rosadio, Dialy Freitas, Kevin Mejía	Drama, Mystery, Thriller	Premiered on December 4
Street Wanderers	Los caminantes de la calle	Juan Martín Hsu	Victoria Almeida, Andrés Tan He, Yuchen Che, Chien Min Lee, Yam Pin Kon, Willy Kon Chin Yi, Alex Kawen León Yee, Emilio Chau Chiu	Crime, Thriller	Nominated - Critics' Picks Competition - Best Film Award at the 29th Tallinn Black Nights Film Festival Nominated - Cine de Genero Award at the 41st Guadalajara International Film Festival It was commercially released on August 27, 2026, in Peruvian theaters An international co-production with Argentina
To Die For	No te mueras por mí	Daniel Rehder	Juan Carlos Rey de Castro, Ximena Palomino, Mónica Sánchez, Anahí de Cárdenas, Ebelin Ortiz, Denise Dibós, Luana Barron, Adolfo Aguilar, Arianna Fernandez	Drama, Romance, Thriller	Premiered on 3 April
2026
Así no juega Perú		Sebastián García	Pablo Villanueva 'Melcochita', Manolo Rojas, Karen América, Susan León, Miguel Vergara, Marco Antonio Miranda, Alec Chaparro, Gherson Flores	Comedy, Political satire	Premiered on 22 January
My Best Enemy	Mi mejor enemiga	Saskia Bernaola	Nataniel Sánchez, Carlos Casella, Kukuli Morante, Fiorella Luna, Omar García, Carla Arriola, Guillermo Castañeda, Mateo Garrido Lecca, Karina Rivera, Ricardo Bonilla, Fernando Bakovic, Patricia Portocarrero	Comedy	Premiered on 5 February

== See also ==
- Cinema of Peru
- Media of Peru
- List of Peruvian submissions for the Academy Award for Best International Feature Film
- Elcine
- Lima Film Festival
- Inkafest
- National and International Short Film Festival of Cuzco Peru
- Latin American cinema
