= Rapto =

- Theatrical release poster
- Directed by: Frank Pérez-Garland
- Written by: Alberto Rojas Apel; Vanessa Saba
- Produced by: Victoria Aizenstat; Giovanni Ciccia; Claudia Farfan; Georget Gallet; Mauro Guevara; Mercedes Roca; Vanessa Saba; Gustavo Sánchez; Katherine Villar
- Starring: Stefano Salvini
- Production companies: Elefante Miope; La Soga Producciones; Aleph Cine; INCAA; Ibermedia
- Release date: March 7, 2019
- Running time: 97 minutes
- Countries: Peru; Argentina
- Language: Spanish
- Budget: $450,000

Rapto (lit. 'Rapture') is a 2019 mystery thriller film directed by Frank Pérez-Garland and written by Alberto Rojas Apel and Vanessa Saba. It stars Stefano Salvini. It premiered on March 7, 2019, in Peruvian theaters.

== Synopsis ==
Sebastian Freyre, an outstanding law student in his last year and belonging to a wealthy Lima family, desperately seeks to find the whereabouts of his kidnapped grandfather. Along with Espinoza, his friend, and teacher, they begin a fight against time to find their grandfather before the four days that the kidnappers have given as the deadline. Along the way, secrets and revelations will come out that his family would never have wanted him to know.

== Cast ==
The actors participating in this film are:

- Stefano Salvini as Sebastián Freyre
- Osmar Núñez as Espinoza
- Alejandro Holguín as Martín
- Gustavo Bueno as Grandfather
- Sandro Calderón as Dad Martin
- Iván Chávez as Torres
- Giovanni Ciccia as Cárdenas
- Martha Figueroa as Grandmother
- Julia Thays as Mom Martin
- Maria Fernanda Valera as Eve
- Alicia Mercado as Teacher Girlfriend

== Production ==
In November 2015, it was announced that Frank Perez-Garland would work with his wife Vanessa Saba in a new production titled El secuestro (The kidnapping) which they later changed to Rapto (Rapture). The film was financially supported after being one of the winning productions in the Ibermedia 2015 contest.

== Reception ==
Rapto drew fewer than 20,000 viewers in its first week in theaters.
