= In House (film) =

Casadentro
- Theatrical release poster
- Directed by: Joanna Lombardi
- Written by: Joanna Lombardi
- Produced by: Jorge Constantino; Joanna Lombardi; Miguel Valladares
- Starring: Élide Brero; Delfina Paredes; Stephanie Orúe
- Cinematography: Inti Briones
- Edited by: Brian Jacobs
- Production companies: El Arbol Azul; Tondero Producciones
- Distributed by: Tondero Producciones
- Release date: October 18, 2012
- Running time: 87 minutes
- Country: Peru
- Language: Spanish

In House (Spanish: Casadentro) is a 2012 Peruvian drama film written and directed by Joanna Lombardi in her directorial debut. Starring Élide Brero and Delfina Paredes, it premiered on October 18, 2012 in Peruvian theaters.

== Synopsis ==
In this film, four generations of women live together who are forced to interact, to look at each other and not look at each other, to spend a night in the same house. It is a film that trusts that the real conflicts arise in everyday life, behind the day-to-day, behind breakfast.

== Cast ==
The actors participating in this film are:

- Élide Brero as Pilar
- Delfina Paredes as Consuelo
- Stephanie Orúe as Milagros

== Production ==
The film was filmed with S/.470,000 obtained after winning the Conacine 2010 Feature Film Contest. The filming of the film ended on June 1, 2011, and the post-production stage ended at the end of 2011.

== Awards ==
- Montreal World Film Festival
  - Winner - Best Fiction First Film
- 36th Word Film Festival
  - Winner - Golden Zenith
