= La pasión artesanal =

- Promotional release poster
- Directed by: Roberto Barba
- Written by: Roberto Barba
- Produced by: Roberto Barba; César Cornejo
- Cinematography: Roberto Barba; Miguel Piedra; Juan Sanchez Idrogo
- Edited by: Roberto Barba; César Cornejo
- Music by: Rafo Ráez
- Production company: Transversal Films
- Release date: October 21, 2021 (Cineaparte)
- Running time: 90 minutes
- Country: Peru
- Language: Spanish

La pasión artesanal (lit. 'The artisanal passion') is a 2021 Peruvian documentary film co-written, co-produced, co-filmed, co-edited and directed by Roberto Barba. It follows the history and reunion of Peru with the art of craft beer from different regions.

== Synopsis ==
For many years, Peru’s beer market was dominated by industrial brands. More recently, microbreweries have emerged in several regions of the country, producing beers with a variety of flavours, textures and aromas.

== Release ==
La pasión artesanal premiered online on October 21, 2021, at Cineaparte, then screened on March 19, 2022, in the Cinema Cocina section of the 25th Málaga Film Festival.
