= Y si te vi, no me acuerdo =

- Theatrical release poster
- Directed by: Miguel Barreda
- Written by: Miguel Barreda
- Produced by: Stefan Kaspar; Volker Ullrich
- Cinematography: Emiliano Villanueva
- Edited by: Miguel Barreda-Delgado; Florencia Hurtado
- Music by: Wicho Garcia; Jorge Pelo Maduena
- Production companies: Casablanca Films; Känguruh Film GmbH
- Release dates: 2003 (Quito Film Festival); May 5, 2011 (Peru)
- Running time: 90 minutes
- Countries: Peru; Germany
- Language: Spanish

Y si te vi, no me acuerdo (lit. 'And if I saw you, I don't remember') is a 2003 Peruvian-German drama road movie written and directed by Miguel Barreda in his directorial debut. It stars Miguel Iza, Marisol Palacios and Matthias Dittmer. The film is considered the first road movie made in Peru.

== Synopsis ==
The paths of a man in search of his past, a woman in search of her future and another man with an obsessive goal, cross on the Pan-American highway.

== Cast ==
The actors participating in this film are:

- Marisol Palacios as Eva María
- Miguel Iza as "Lizard"
- Mathías Dettmer as Jo
- Gilberto Torres
- Delfina Paredes

== Production ==
The film was filmed between 1999 and 2000 in the DigiBeta format, and was completed in its entirety in 2001.

== Release ==
The film was scheduled to be released after a transfer to the 35mm format, but it could not be released because they did not get the necessary money ($40,000) for the transfer to 35mm format.

=== Festivals ===
After failing to get financing, the film was screened at various festivals such as the Iberoamerican Quito Film Festival, Ecuador in 2003 where it won the Audience Award, as well as being screened on German and Spanish television.

=== Theatrical release ===
The film was commercially released on 5 May 2011, in Peruvian theaters, after having obtained enough money, from Conacine, to transfer the film to the correct format.
