= Macho peruano que se respeta =

- Theatrical release poster
- Directed by: Carlos Landeo
- Written by: Carlos Landeo
- Produced by: Varun Kumar Kapur
- Starring: Carlos Vilchez
- Cinematography: Freddi Hernandez
- Production company: Star Films
- Distributed by: Star Films
- Release date: May 21, 2015
- Running time: 102 minutes
- Country: Peru
- Language: Spanish

Macho peruano que se respeta (lit. 'Peruvian male that is respected') is a 2015 Peruvian romantic sex comedy film written and directed by Carlos Landeo in his directorial debut. It stars Carlos Vilchez. It premiered on May 21, 2015, in Peruvian theaters.

== Synopsis ==
Máximo is a conqueror and within his charismatic and popular neighborhood of the fence he is known as a true "macho who respects himself", however he is a thousand trades that goes from bad to worse. With such a good reputation, one of his friends and disciples will make him a bet that he will not be able to refuse: to make the new neighbor, Carol, fall in love with her, who is known as the most pitiful and difficult woman; achieving it would mean paying off the debt of his workshop and gaining more reputation. But Máximo feels strongly attracted to Sarita, the sweetest girl he has ever met, forcing him to lead a double life, between being a casanova or acting like a true man in love.

== Cast ==
The actors participating in this film are:

- Carlos Vilchez as Máximo Arriola
- Titi Plaza
- Leisy Suarez
- Rodolfo Carrión “Fellpudini”
- Amparo Brambilla
- Haydeé Cáceres
- Dante del Águila

== Reception ==
In its first weekend in theaters the film attracted more than 70,000 viewers, the number increased to 180,000 for its second week in theaters.
