= An Unexpected Marriage =

- Theatrical release poster
- Directed by: Enrique Chimoy Sierra
- Written by: Enrique Chimoy Sierra
- Produced by: Mauricio Vélez; Carlos Tello
- Starring: Renzo Schuller; Korina Rivadeneyra
- Cinematography: Gustavo Ríos
- Edited by: Roberto Barha
- Music by: Juan Carlos Fernandez
- Production company: Tercer Ojo Producciones
- Distributed by: Cinecolor Films
- Release date: August 24, 2023
- Running time: 98 minutes
- Country: Peru
- Language: Spanish

An Unexpected Marriage (Spanish: Un matrimonio inesperado) is a 2023 Peruvian romantic comedy film written and directed by Enrique Chimoy Sierra. It stars Renzo Schuller and Korina Rivadeneyra accompanied by Fiorella Rodríguez, Guille Castañeda, Patricia Portocarrero, Miguel Vergara, Mabel Duclós and Giannina Alves.

== Synopsis ==
Valeria is a very distrustful young Venezuelan who believes that people are only looking to take advantage of her. She works illegally in a bar, where she meets Enrique, the owner of a hotel, whom she will have to marry to ensure that the immigration agents do not take action against her.

== Cast ==
- Renzo Schuller as Enrique
- Korina Rivadeneyra as Valeria
- Fiorella Rodríguez as Sandra Panduro
- Guille Castañeda as Marcelo
- Coco Limo as Simón
- Patricia Portocarrero as Pamela
- Miguel Vergara as Carrasco
- Mabel Duclós as Rosalía
- Giannina Alves as Daviana

== Production ==
Principal photography began on February 5, 2023, in Lima, Peru

== Release ==
An Unexpected Marriage premiered on August 24, 2023, in Peruvian theaters, and then expanded on November 23, 2023, to the Venezuelan market.

== Box-office ==
On its first day in theaters, it attracted 6,000 spectators to the cinema, finishing in sixth place.
