= Soledad.com =

- Film poster
- Directed by: Antonio Landeo; Ítalo Lorenzzi; Martín Landeo
- Written by: Antonio Landeo
- Produced by: Martín Landeo; Ítalo Lorenzzi Bolaños; Antonio Landeo
- Starring: Julián Legaspi; Antonio Arrué
- Cinematography: Fergán Chávez-Ferrer
- Production companies: Qori Movies (Perú); Jensen Productions (USA)
- Release date: May 12, 2016
- Running time: 82 minutes
- Country: Peru
- Language: Spanish

Soledad.com (lit. 'Solitude.com') is a 2016 Peruvian science fiction thriller film directed and co-produced by Antonio Landeo, Ítalo Lorenzzi and Martín Landeo, with a script written by Antonio Landeo. Starring Julián Legaspi and Antonio Arrué.

== Synopsis ==
In the computer system of the National Systems Institute, a hacker mafia has inserted a virus, the Trojan. Ángel (Julián Legaspi), a professor of New Technologies discovers the fact and trying to solve the problem, he realizes that the World Wide Web is about to collapse. All the data on the Network could disappear. There is only one possibility to eliminate that threat: Entering the NETWORK. Together with Ximena, the model and host Clelia Francesconi, a diligent student, and Alejandro (Alexis Villagra), owner of Vilsol, a leading Information Security company, who have the necessary knowledge to disable the Trojan, they immerse themselves in the virtual world.

== Cast ==
The actors participating in this film are:

- Julián Legaspi as Ángel
- Clelia Francesconi as Ximena
- Marcelo Rivera as Miguel
- Alexis Villagra as Alejandro
- Carlos Barraza as Hacker
- Julio Andrade as Alejandro
- Antonio Arrué
- Enrique Victoria

== Release ==
It was commercially released on May 12, 2016, in Peruvian theaters.
