= Live or Dead: The García File =

2024 Peruvian mystery drama film

- Theatrical release poster
- Directed by: Jorge Prado
- Written by: Úrsula Vilca
- Produced by: Martín Casapía
- Starring: Stephany Orúe; Sergio Galliani; Merly Morello
- Cinematography: Marco Arauco
- Edited by: Sara Oscco
- Music by: Adrian Nicholas Valdez
- Production company: Jungle Pictures
- Release date: April 18, 2024
- Running time: 84 minutes
- Country: Peru
- Language: Spanish

Live or Dead: The García File (Spanish: Vivo o muerto: el expediente García) is a 2024 Peruvian political thriller film directed by Jorge Prado and written by Úrsula Vilca. It stars Stephany Orúe, Sergio Galliani, and Merly Morello, based on the story of the suicide of former Peruvian president Alan García Pérez. It premiered on April 18, 2024, in Peruvian theaters.

== Synopsis ==
Following the alleged suicide of Alan García, journalist Carmen Ríos investigates the case to uncover whether he truly died or is still alive.

== Cast ==
The film stars Stephany Orúe, Sergio Galliani, and Merly Morello, and features the participation of Peruvian veteran actor Luis Ángel Pinasco.

=== Main Cast ===
- Stephany Orúe as Carmen Ríos.
- Sergio Galliani as Marco.
- Merly Morello as Micaela.

=== Supporting Cast ===
- Américo Zúñiga as Rodríguez.
- Luis Ángel Pinasco as Félix.
- Katerina D'Onofrio as Bárbara.
- Omar García as Olivas.
- Tatiana Astengo as Cristina.
- Guillermo Castañeda as Fabio.
- Gabriela Velásquez as Soledad.
- Flor Castillo as Eva.
- Claret Quea as Super Azul.
- Cathy Sáenz as Charo.
- Alberick Garcia as Rondón.
- Hugo Salazar as Prosecutor Rengifo.
- Rodrigo Palacios as Rafael.
- Víctor Prada as lawyer.
- Alexandra Garcés as Abigail.
- Alejandra Guerra as Inés.
