= The Peruvian Centaurs =

- Directed by: Jorge Goytizolo
- Release date: 24 December 1912
- Running time: 16 minutes
- Country: Peru

The Peruvian Centaurs is a film directed by Jorge Goytizolo in 1912. It is the first Peruvian film and documentary.

The film, with a duration of 16 minutes, is a series of recordings of Peruvian Cavalry troops of the 3rd Cavalry regiment. It was filmed at Magdalena del Mar on 6 December 1912.The film was influenced by the Italian film, Los centauros, exhibited in Lima in 1919.

According to Peruvian educator Elvira García y García, the film was exhibited in the main theatre in Tacna, while the city was under Chilean administration after the War of the Pacific, which caused clashes between the Chilean and Peruvian population.
