= Choleando =

- Film poster
- Directed by: Roberto de la Puente
- Written by: Roberto de la Puente
- Produced by: Luis Antonio Dominguez
- Starring: Mariananda Schempp; Julio Navarro
- Cinematography: Diego Giannoni; Luis Antonio Domínguez; Roberto de la Puente
- Edited by: Roberto de la Puente
- Music by: Jorge Martín García; Julio Soto Quiñe; Tony Hernández Novoa
- Animation by: Roberto de la Puente; Luis Antonio Dominguez
- Production companies: Relapso Filmes; IDM; Taller de Antropología Visual; Cabina Subsónica
- Release date: February 23, 2012
- Running time: 102 minutes
- Country: Peru
- Language: Spanish

Choleando (also known as Choleando: Racism in Peru) is a 2012 Peruvian documentary film written and directed by Roberto de la Puente in his directorial debut. It stars Mariananda Schempp & Julio Navarro. It premiered on February 23, 2012, at the 2012 Ibero-American Digital Film Festival.

== Synopsis ==
For Mariananda there is no doubt: it is because of racism. There always has been, always will be. But Julio is not so sure. Is it really about racism? Are they not confusing racism with the many other types of discrimination that we Peruvians practice? To begin with: what is racism? This documentary will try to resolve which of the two is right, reviewing the multiple forms of discrimination that we Peruvians practice, investigating their origins and their unfortunate consequences. Through interviews, animations and supporting images, Mariananda and Julio will gain an in-depth understanding of Peru's confusing system of racial discrimination.

== Cast ==
- Julio Navarro as himself
- Mariananda Schempp as herself
