= The Banquet (2024 film) =

- Promotional release poster
- Directed by: Michs Carbajal
- Written by: Diego Correa; Tony Gonzales
- Produced by: Arturo Lecca Ricra; Cristopher Salcedo Palomino
- Starring: Sandro Calderòn; Natalia Montoya; Víctor Acurio
- Cinematography: Daniel Sotelo; Diego Torres Ramos
- Edited by: Rodrigo Chahuares
- Production company: Toulouse Lautrec
- Release date: October 15, 2024 (Lima Alterna IFF)
- Running time: 78 minutes
- Country: Peru
- Language: Spanish
- Budget: $20,000

The Banquet (Spanish: El banquete) is a 2024 Peruvian folk horror film directed by Michs Carbajal (in his directorial debut) and written by Diego Correa and Tony Gonzales, starring Sandro Calderón, Natalia Montoya and Victor Acurio.

== Synopsis ==
Uqbar is the leader of a small family condemned to suffering. He has decided to change the situation through a deal with Zhenazay to find a way to end the agony, no matter what sacrifice he must make.

== Cast ==
- Sandro Calderón as Uqbar
- Natalia Montoya as Eloisa
- Victor Acurio as Vladimir

== Production ==
Principal photography began on September 11, 2023, in Peru.

== Release ==
The film had its premiere on October 15, 2024, at the 5th Lima Alterna International Film Festival.

== Reception ==
=== Critical reception ===
Marcelo Paredes from Cinencuentro points out that although the tense atmosphere is constructed in a good way, the film seeks to cover many topics without delving into any of them, causing the terrifying tone to be considerably diluted. Likewise, he points out that the elements of popular horror are not adequately highlighted beyond the characters presented.

=== Accolades ===
Year	Award / Festival	Category	Recipient	Result	Ref.
2024	5th Lima Alterna International Film Festival	Peruvian Competition - Best Film	The Banquet	Nominated	
