= Pandemia C19 =

- Promotional release poster
- Directed by: Mitchel Ramos Lomparte
- Written by: Mitchel Ramos Lomparte
- Produced by: Mitchel Ramos Lomparte
- Starring: Mitchel Ramos Lomparte
- Cinematography: Mitchel Ramos Lomparte; Rodrigo Briones; Rosangela Gonzales; Alexander Salazar; Joshi Abad; Gabriela Turpo; Moises Quispe
- Edited by: Mitchel Ramos Lomparte
- Production company: K. T. n Martial Art Films
- Release dates: September 16, 2022 (Casma); September 17, 2022 (Joinnus)
- Running time: 119 minutes
- Country: Peru
- Languages: Spanish; Quechua

Pandemia C19 (lit. 'C19 pandemic') is a 2022 Peruvian independent action thriller drama film written, produced, co-filmed, edited, starred and directed by Mitchel Ramos Lomparte. It is about a military squad fighting in a zombie apocalypse caused by the fourth dose of the COVID-19 cure.

== Synopsis ==
The last dose of a vaccine to control a pandemic causes everything to get out of control, transforming people into terrifying beings. Only a special squad will try to get to the truth.

== Cast ==
- Mitchel Ramos as Agent Chanyui
- María Timana as Agent Liz
- Gabriela Turpo as Agent Ruth
- Irvin Palacios as Agent Gonzáles
- Luis Pacush as Agent Irvin
- Jesua Aliaga as Commander Prado
- Victor Mejía as Business Partner
- Américo Zuñiga as Colonel Hugarte
- Jhon Cortez as Manager of the Corporation
- Traysi Sánchez as Corporation Manager
- Moisés Quispe as Scientific President
- Cyndrith Neyra as Doctor Rachell
- Arcadio Mendez as Corporate Partner
- Jr. Francia as Military Guard
- Melanie Moreno as Colonel Hugarte's Daughter
- Rocío Roque as Winery Owner
- Rocío Angeles as Squad Girl
- Nicole Salazar as TV Host
- Luz Dueñas as Reporter
- Mariella Yarrow as Squad Girl's Mom
- Alfredo Vasquez as Brujo Sechín
- Eduardo Cano as Witch's Assistant

== Release ==
Pandemia C19 had its world premiere on September 16, 2022, in Casma, Ancash, and was released the next day in online format via Joinnus.
