= El pequeño seductor =

- Theatrical release poster
- Directed by: Wilf Sifuentes
- Written by: Lino Bolaños
- Produced by: Varun Kumar Kapur
- Starring: Miguel Barraza
- Cinematography: Freddi Hernandez
- Music by: Alejandro Castañeda
- Production companies: Dealers Productions; Star Films
- Release date: February 5, 2015
- Running time: 86 minutes
- Country: Peru
- Language: Spanish

El pequeño seductor (lit. 'The little seducer') is a 2015 Peruvian sex comedy film directed by Wilf Sifuentes (in his directorial debut) and written by Lino Bolaños. Starring Miguel Barraza, it premiered on February 5, 2015, in Peruvian theaters.

== Synopsis ==
A widower has lost his seductive skills and wants to get them back with the help of two friends. This need to find beautiful girls generates situations that will put him in a thousand troubles. This is opposed by his deceased wife who appears in various situations so that the protagonist can consummate their relationships.

== Cast ==
The actors participating in this film are:

- Miguel Barraza as Emilio
- Kali Kiyasumac as Camila

== Controversy ==
At the premiere of the film Miguel Barraza, the protagonist of the film, arrived in an apparent drunken state, where he began to insult Carlos Álvarez and Carlos Alcántara, overshadowing the preview of his film, and apparently scaring away potential viewers. 5 years later Miguel Barraza admitted that he arrived drunk at the premiere of his film but said that it was the fault of the producer of the film who wanted Miguel to star in a scandal to attract people. He also confessed that he was scammed, because he was never paid for his performance.

== Reception ==
On its first day it drew 11,000 spectators. In its opening weekend it drew 40,500 viewers. Throughout its time in theaters it attracted 96,500 spectators, a box office failure.
