= Atrapado en mi mente =

- Theatrical release poster
- Directed by: Richard Santaria Romero
- Written by: Richard Santaria Romero; Yeny Yalan
- Produced by: Yeny Yalan
- Starring: Andrea Luna; Sebastián Stimman
- Cinematography: Jorge Cerna
- Edited by: Richard Santaría
- Music by: JD Malachowski
- Production company: Trébol Producciones
- Release dates: September 2022 (Insólito); July 20, 2023 (Peru)
- Running time: 100 minutes
- Country: Peru
- Language: Spanish
- Budget: S/120,000

Atrapado en mi mente (lit. 'Trapped in my mind') is a 2022 Peruvian psychological thriller film directed by Richard Santaria Romero (in his directorial debut) and written by Romero and Yeny Yalan. It stars Andrea Luna and Sebastián Stimman. It is about a fan and his fatal obsession with a famous YouTuber whom he begins to harass.

== Synopsis ==
Christian is a young man who works from home, who suffers from a mental disorder and tends to become easily obsessed with women. This is how it comes into the life of Verónica, a young YouTuber who wishes she had not exposed her life so much on social media.

== Cast ==
- Andrea Luna as Verónica
- Sebastian Stimman as Christian

== Release ==
Atrapado en mi mente premieres at the end of September 2022 at the 5th Insólito Fantasy and Horror Film Festival. The film was commercially released on July 20, 2023, in Peruvian theaters.
