= El Correcaminos =

- Theatrical release poster
- Directed by: Barney Elliott
- Written by: Rafael Benavides; Barney Elliott; Diego López Francia; Bernhard Wittich
- Produced by: Barney Elliott
- Starring: Emanuel Soriano
- Cinematography: Bernhard Wittich
- Edited by: Barney Elliott; Gino Moreno; Chino Pinto
- Distributed by: Cinecolor Films Perú
- Release dates: November 4, 2025 (Lima); November 6, 2025 (Peru)
- Running time: 107 minutes
- Country: Peru
- Language: Spanish

El Correcaminos (lit. 'The Road Runner') is a 2025 Peruvian action comedy film co-written, produced, co-edited and directed by Barney Elliott. It stars Emanuel Soriano as a young mototaxi racing champion who returns to racing to save his family's home. The rest of the cast is made up of Oscar Meza, Ximena Palomino, Daniela Olaya, Emilram Cossío, Armando Machuca, Daniel Menacho, Elsa Olivero, Carlos Mesta, and Víctor Prada.

== Cast ==
The actors participating in this film are:

- Emanuel Soriano as Jesús
- Oscar Meza as El Tunche
- Ximena Palomino as July
- Daniela Olaya as Lili
- Emilram Cossío as Willie
- Armando Machuca as George
- Daniel Menacho as Ratón
- Elsa Olivero as María
- Carlos Mesta as Máximo
- Víctor Prada as Juan Palomo
- Junior Silva as Ramón
- Víctor Acurio as Ukuku
- Lolo Balbin as Brujo Moche
- Sandro Calderón as Pancho Salas
- Rishabh Chadha as Ravindra Gopalakrishnan Iyer
- Iván Chávez as Don Ruperto
- Alejandro Clavier as Venezolano
- Bernabé D'arrigo as Frutero
- Joel Fuentes as Chinchano
- César García as Gancho
- Leandro Mikati as Pollito
- Moisés Orbegoso as Gato Flaco
- Facundo Posincovich as Surfer
- Claret Quea as Fan Fanático
- Jely Reátegui as Ciega
- Rodrigo Reyes as Ballena
- Moisés Torres as Charapa

== Release ==
The film had its world premiere on November 4, 2025, in Lima, followed by a wide national theatrical release on November 6.

== Future ==
According to a news report, the film's director, Barney Elliott, is considering the possibility of making a sequel.
