= Choropampa, The Price of Gold =

Choropampa, el precio del oro
- Theatrical release poster
- Directed by: Ernesto Cabellos; Stephanie Boyd
- Written by: Ernesto Cabellos; Stephanie Boyd
- Produced by: Ernesto Cabellos; Rafael Cabellos
- Cinematography: Ernesto Cabellos
- Edited by: Ernesto Cabellos; Stephanie Boyd; Edgardo Castañeda
- Production company: Guarango - Cine y Video
- Release date: March 11, 2002
- Running time: 75 minutes
- Country: Peru
- Language: Spanish

Choropampa, The Price of Gold (Spanish: Choropampa, el precio del oro) is a 2002 Peruvian documentary film written and directed by Ernesto Cabellos and Stephanie Boyd in their directorial debut. The film tells of the struggle of the local Choropampa community to protect themselves from the large-scale exploitation of a gold mine.

== Synopsis ==
A large Mercury (element) spill by a gold mining corporation transforms a peasant village in Peru's Andean mountains into a site of civil resistance. A young mayor emerges to lead his people on a quest for healthcare and justice, but other interests thwart the villagers in this 2-year chronicle of the real price of gold.

== Reception ==
Robert Koehler of Variety wrote: "In the best tradition of docu cinema, Choropampa, The Price of Gold expands on the immediate events it covers -- the aftermath of a June 2000 spill of toxic mercury in the Peruvian gold-mining town of Choropampa -- to ask larger questions about corporate and government responsibility in Third World regions rich in natural resources but poor in material wealth".

=== Awards ===
Year	Award	Category	Recipient	Result	Ref.
2002	Mar del Plata Film Festival	OCIC Cinematographic Post-Production Award	Choropampa, The Price of Gold	Won	
2003	Prague One World Film Festival	Rudolf Vrba Award	Choropampa, The Price of Gold	Won	
2003	Valladolid International Film Festival	Best Documentary	Choropampa, The Price of Gold	Nominated	
