= Píxeles de familia =

- Theatrical release poster
- Directed by: Gerardo Ruiz Miñán
- Written by: Gerardo Ruiz Miñán
- Starring: Paul Vega; Sergio Gjurinovic; Yvonne Frayssinet; Wendy Vásquez; Lizet Chávez
- Cinematography: Mario Bassino
- Production companies: Musquchay Films; Raquel en Llamas SAC
- Distributed by: BF Distribution
- Release date: 10 October 2019
- Running time: 85 minutes
- Country: Peru
- Language: Spanish

Píxeles de familia (lit. 'Family pixels') is a 2019 Peruvian drama film written and directed by Gerardo Ruiz Miñán in his directorial debut. It tells the story of a family from Lima, whose routine is altered by circumstances that can happen to anyone. It stars Paul Vega, Sergio Gjurinovic, Yvonne Frayssinet, Wendy Vásquez and Lizet Chávez. It premiered on 10 October 2019 in Peruvian theaters.

== Synopsis ==
Polo and Monica's marriage is going through a crisis. At the same time, Bicho, Monica's brother, is keeping a secret and must deal with his mother's crisis. A sudden accident might be able to get this family back together. A pixel is just a dot in the middle of nowhere, it needs to be by the side of others to understand its true self.

== Cast ==
The actors participating in this film are:

- Paul Vega as Polo
- Wendy Vásquez as Mónica
- Yvonne Frayssinet as Carmela
- Sergio Gjurinovic as 'Bicho'
- Lizet Chávez as Lucía

== Release ==
Filming took place in 2012, but it was only possible to release it in 2019 when the film won the award for production and distribution from the Directorate of Audiovisuals, Phonography and New Media (DAFO), of the Ministry of Culture in 2018. It premiered on 10 October 2019 in Peruvian theaters.
