= Somos Néctar =

- Film poster
- Directed by: Coco Bravo
- Written by: César de María
- Produced by: Deyvis Orosco
- Starring: Mabel Duclós; Junior Silva; Óscar Beltrán; Carlos Casella; Deyvis Orosco
- Cinematography: Mario Bassino
- Music by: Grupo Néctar
- Production company: Deyvis Orosco Corporación
- Distributed by: New Century Films
- Release date: October 5, 2017
- Running time: 100 minutes
- Country: Peru
- Language: Spanish

Somos Néctar (also known as: Somos Néctar, la película, lit. 'We are Nectar, the movie') is a 2017 Peruvian comedy film directed by Coco Bravo (in his directorial debut) and written by César de María. It is inspired by the Peruvian musical orchestra Grupo Néctar, serving as a tribute after the death of the original members in a car accident in Argentina in 2007. It stars Mabel Duclós, Junior Silva, Óscar Beltrán, Carlos Casella and Deyvis Orosco. The film premiered on October 5, 2017, in Peruvian theaters.

== Synopsis ==
10 years have passed since a car accident left a great void in the fans of the Grupo Néctar. So, we find ourselves with the story of Sarita, an old woman who despite the Alzheimer does not forget the promise that her three grandchildren made her almost 10 years ago: a concert with Johnny Orosco and his group Nectar at her home. This is how the adventure of Tato, Memo and Gianfranco begins, three grandchildren willing to do anything to not disappoint or hurt the feelings of their beloved grandmother.

== Cast ==
- Mabel Duclós as Sarita
- Junior Silva as Memo
- Oscar Beltran
- Carlos Casella
- Deyvis Orosco as himself
- Mayella Lloclla
- Monica Torres
- Oscar Beltran
- Sheyla Rojas

== Production ==
The film began filming on May 22, 2017, in the middle of Deyvis Orosco's concert on the esplanade Plaza Norte. The filming ended on July 15, 2017.

== Reception ==
Somos Néctar attracted more than 60,000 people on its first day on the billboard. At the end of its first week in theaters, the film attracted 100,000 viewers. At the end of the year the film attracted 308,523 viewers to the theater, becoming the seventh highest grossing Peruvian film of 2017.
