= The Linda James Case =

- Promotional release poster
- Directed by: Kenny Roller López Curiniqui
- Written by: Kenny Roller López Curiniqui
- Produced by: Kenny Roller López Curiniqui
- Production company: Kenny Producciones
- Release date: May 11, 2023 (Nuevo Chimbote)
- Running time: 104 minutes
- Country: Peru
- Language: Spanish

The Linda James Case (Spanish: El caso de Linda James) is a 2023 Peruvian independent horror drama film written, produced and directed by Kenny Roller López Curiniqui. The cast is made up of Katiana Cordova, Key Benites, Enoc Sarmiento, Brenda Hernández, Juvitza Gutierrez, Claudia Gutierrez, Jhony Flores, Shirley Vasquéz and Carlos Quiros.

== Synopsis ==
A young university student has a mental disorder for which she is rejected by her family and experiences bullying. However, when some students decided to use her case for an audiovisual project, they discovered that what Linda suffered was more than a psychological problem, awakening in her a thirst for revenge.

== Cast ==
- Katiana Cordova
- Key Benites
- Enoc Sarmiento
- Brenda Hernández
- Juvitza Gutierrez
- Jhony Flores
- Shirley Vasquéz

== Release ==
The film premiered on May 11, 2023, at the Municipal Theater of Nuevo Chimbote, Peru, then was released on July 4 of the same year on YouTube.
