= Así nomás =

- Theatrical release poster
- Directed by: Willy Combe
- Written by: Willy Combe
- Starring: Renzo Schuller; Franco Cabrera; Emilram Cossio
- Cinematography: Cesar Fajardo
- Music by: Sergio Bringas
- Production companies: Transversal Films; La diosa Mystic Passion Films; Aluzcine
- Distributed by: Star Films
- Release date: July 28, 2016
- Running time: 95 minutes
- Country: Peru
- Language: Spanish

Así nomás (lit. 'Just like that') is a 2016 Peruvian comedy film written and directed by Willy Combe, and starring Renzo Schuller, Franco Cabrera and Emilram Cossio. It premiered on July 28, 2016, in Peruvian theaters.

== Synopsis ==
Three friends decide to make a zombie movie with no money, and they have to figure out how to do it. This is how they come to obtain a surprising result: a film to laugh from beginning to end and that leaves a lesson in overcoming life's obstacles.

== Cast ==
The actors participating in this film are:

- Renzo Schuller as Víctor
- Franco Cabrera as Orestes
- Emilram Cossio as Jairo
- Pold Gastello
- Óscar López Arias
- Katia Palma
- Sheyla Rojas

== Reception ==
Así nomás drew 54,999 viewers in its three weeks in theaters.
