= El bandolero =

- Theatrical release poster
- Directed by: Dante Rubio Rodrigo
- Written by: Dante Rubio Rodrigo
- Starring: Dante Rubio Rodrigo; Karol Villacorta
- Cinematography: Dante Rubio Rodrigo
- Music by: Dante Rubio Rodrigo
- Production company: Cygnus Producciones
- Release date: 2015
- Running time: 105 minutes
- Country: Peru
- Language: Spanish

El bandolero (lit. 'The highwayman') is a 2015 Peruvian martial arts thriller film written, filmed, directed and co-starred by Dante Rubio Rodrigo.

== Synopsis ==
A man wants to put an end to the injustices and crime that are rampant in Chota. For this reason, he murders those who he judges to be criminals, in accordance with his absurd philosophy according to which one must kill so that others do not do so in the future.

== Release ==
It premiered on August 21, 2015, in Peruvian theaters. To then premiere on September 28, 2016, at the Clico de Cine Peruano de Primavera 2016, and in October of the same year at the 3rd Trujillo Film Festival 2016.
