= De patitas a la calle =

- Theatrical release poster
- Directed by: Carlos Landeo
- Written by: Adrián Ochoa
- Produced by: María Grazia Dolci; Varun Kumar Kapur
- Cinematography: Pedro Rivas
- Production companies: Animal Action Films; Bisa Films; Animalaction Films; Star Films
- Distributed by: Star Films
- Release date: February 27, 2020
- Running time: 83 minutes
- Country: Peru
- Language: Spanish

De patitas a la calle (lit. 'From paws to the street') is a 2020 Peruvian fantasy comedy film directed by Carlos Landeo and written by Adrián Ochoa. It is the first Peruvian production where the protagonists are talking animals. It premiered on November 27, 2020, in Peruvian theaters.

== Synopsis ==
It tells the story of an adorable brigade of pets made up of dogs, a cat, a parrot, and a goat. They will have a very important mission: return home; However, along the way they will encounter human cruelty, which sees in them a method of profit.

== Cast ==
The actors participating in this film are:

- Nicolás Fantinato as Toto
- Nico Argelo as Aron
- Pold Gastello as General
- Titi Plaza as Lazmi
- Jean Rivera Jurado as The one who carries the dog
- Pietro Sibille
- Junior Silva
- Stephanie Orúe
- Nico Ames
- Carlos Casella
- Airam Galliani

== Reception ==
De patitas a la calle attracted 26,952 people throughout its run in Peruvian theaters.
