= El abigeo =

- Film poster
- Directed by: Flaviano Quispe
- Screenplay by: Flaviano Quispe
- Based on: Ushanan Jampi by Enrique López Albújar
- Produced by: Flaviano Quispe
- Starring: Percy Pacco; Fernando Pacori Mamani; Flaviano Quispe
- Cinematography: Fabián Yto Yucra
- Production company: Contacto Producciones
- Release date: 2001
- Running time: 114 minutes
- Country: Peru
- Languages: Spanish; Quechua

El abigeo (lit. 'The cattle rustler') is a 2001 Peruvian crime drama film written, produced, co-starred and directed by Flaviano Quispe in his directorial debut. Starring Percy Pacco, Fernando Pacori Maman and Flaviano Quispe. It is based on Ushanan Jampi, one of the "Andean Tales" by Enrique López Albújar.

== Synopsis ==
José Maylli, grandson of an old peasant woman, commits the crime of cattle theft three times. This fact is taken as an affront by the community members who proceed to capture the cattle raider, torture him and mass hit, finally they sentence him to leave and not return. Never, on pain of death. However, once in the city, Maylli, plunged in sadness, does not resign himself to the expulsion, two forces attract him to his land: his grandmother and her hut, so he decides to continue the journey carrying gifts and a firearm. prevention.

== Cast ==
- Percy Pacco Lima
- Flaviano Quispe
- Fernando Pacori Mamani
- Victoria Ylaquito Zapana
- Ney Torres Humpire
- Nelly Gonzáles
- Yeni Benique Benique

== Reception ==
The film was seen by 250,000 spectators throughout its run in Peruvian cinemas.
