= Yo mimo soy =

- Theatrical release poster
- Directed by: Héctor Marreros
- Written by: Héctor Marreros
- Starring: Alex Johanson; Sonia Medrano; Yajdel Vásquez; Juan Carlos Morales
- Cinematography: Josué Morales
- Music by: Ulysses Piedra; Kaolín; Wanchaku
- Production companies: Trampolín Perú Producciones; J. M. Udilmabril Films
- Release dates: March 27, 2014 (Cajamarca); August 27, 2015 (Peru)
- Running time: 90 minutes
- Country: Peru
- Language: Spanish

Yo mimo soy (lit. 'I mime am') is a 2014 Peruvian biographical comedy-drama film written and directed by Héctor Marreros. It is based on the autobiographical book by Richard Chávez Vargas, a police non-commissioned officer who alternates his performance in the Emergency Squad with his characterization of the trampoline clown in various activities.

== Synopsis ==
The life of a child from Celendino who dreamed of being a policeman and a clown. Film based on the true story of the Peruvian policeman Richard Chávez Vargas, who in addition to being a member of the police force works as a clown or mime.

== Cast ==
- Alex Johanson
- Arturo Alcántara
- Sonia Medrano
- Yajdel Vásquez
- Juan Carlos Morales

== Release ==
The film premiered on March 27, 2014, in Cajamarca, Peru. It had a limited release in the rest of the country on August 27, 2015.

== Reception ==
It managed to attract 191 viewers in its limited theatrical release.
