= Atrapado, luchando por un sueño =

- Theatrical release poster
- Directed by: Pedro Ramírez Ugarte
- Written by: Pedro Ramírez Ugarte; Julissa Horna
- Starring: Vincenzo Leonardi; Christopher Moreno; Desiree Durán; Daniella Arroyo
- Cinematography: Julio Ramón Riveyro; Andres Magallanes; Freddi Hernandez
- Edited by: Pedro Ramírez; Dan Rosales; Ricardo Fernández
- Production company: Hope Films
- Release dates: May 16, 2022 (Bolivia); September 15, 2022 (Peru)
- Running time: 102 minutes
- Country: Peru
- Language: Spanish

Atrapado, luchando por un sueño (lit. 'Trapped, fighting for a dream') is a 2022 Peruvian drama film directed by Pedro Ramírez Ugarte (in his directorial debut) and written by Ugarte & Julissa Horna. It stars Vincenzo Leonardi, Christopher Moreno, Desirée Durán and Daniella Arroyo.

== Synopsis ==
The film narrates, through flashbacks or memories, the dramatic events in Mateo's childhood, which end up destroying his family and dragging the protagonist down a dark, negative, and lonely path.

== Cast ==
The actors participating in this film are:

- Christopher Moreno as Mateo
- Vincenzo Leonardi
- Giselle Collao
- José Luis Ruiz
- Cati Caballero
- Pelo D’Ambrosio
- Fernando Petong
- Jean Paul Strauss
- Fernando Pasco
- “Pantera” Zegarra

== Release ==
It premiered on May 26, 2022 in Bolivian theaters. It premiered on September 16, 2022 in Peruvian theaters.
