= Bailando por un Sueño (Peruvian TV series) season 2 =

Bailando por un Sueño
- Season 2
- Hosted by: Gisela Valcárcel; Giancarlo Chichizola
- Judges: Joaquín Vargas; Carlos Cacho; Pachi Valle Riestra; Morella Petrozzi
- Celebrity winner: Marco Zunino
- Professional winner: Jardena Ugaz
- No. of episodes: 11

Release
- Original network: Panamericana Televisión
- Original release: August 30 – November 8, 2008

Season chronology
- Next → Season 3

The second season of the Peruvian reality television show Bailando por un Sueño was won by the partnership of Marco Zunino and Jardenia Ugaz.

== Cast ==
Celebrity	Notability (known for)	Dreamer partner	Status
Maria Angélica Vega	Actress & narrator	Henry Otoya	Eliminated 1st on The second gala
Pold Gastello	Actor	Mónica Astacio	Eliminated 2nd on The third gala
Javier Valdez	Actor & theatre director	Erica Chasi	Eliminated 3rd on The fourth gala
Bárbara Cayo	Actress and singer	Henry Ladines	Eliminated 4th on The fifth gala
Marco Antonio Gallegos	Make-up artist & businessman	Eileen Cabrera	Eliminated 5th on The sixth gala
Gustavo Mayer	Actor and TV host	Viviana Guerrero	Eliminated 6th on The seventh gala
Percy Olivares	Former football player	Cecilia Reyes	Eliminated 7th on The eighth gala
Celine Aguirre	Actress and TV host	Nicholas Tineo	Eliminated 8th on The ninth gala
Monserrat Brugué	Actress	Darren Morán	Eliminated 9th on The tenth gala
Delly Madrid	Model & actress	José Luis Campos	Eliminated 10th on The eleventh gala
Norka Ramírez	Actress	Nahum Osorio	Third place on the Finale
Mónica Sánchez	Actress	Alex Petricek	Runners-up on the Finale
Marco Zunino	Actor and singer	Jardenia Ugaz	Winners on the Finale

== Scores ==
Couple	Place	1	2	3	4	5	6	7	8	9	10	11	
Couple	Place	1	2	3	4	5	6	7	8	9	10	1	2
Marco & Jardena	1	20	27	28	29	27	28	64	52	57	61	66	33
Mónica & Alex	2	25	26	29	29	33	31	56	58	65	55	64	39
Norka & Nahun	3	26	20	22	28	24	31	52	57	59	52	58	27
Delly & José Luis	4	25	24	25	31	30	30	57	60	57	52	68	
Monserrat & Darren	5	31	26	29	27	30	29	65	62	56	58		
Celine & Nicholas	6	22	21	26	29	26	29	64	54	60			
Percy & Cecilia	7	30	27	32	26	26	30	52	51				
Gustavo & Viviana	8	32	29	23	25	29	26	59					
Marco Antonio & Eileen	9	26	20	26	27	23	23						
Bárbara & Henry	10	28	22	24	24	26							
Javier & Erica	11	23	19	21	25								
Pold & Mónica	12	25	19	23									
María Angélica & Henry	13	19	28										
