= Denisse Dibós =

Peruvian actress

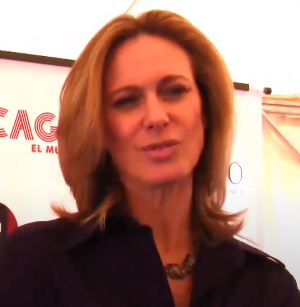
- Born: Maria Denisse Dibós Silva; 15 April 1967 (age 59); Lima, Peru
- Occupations: Actress, theatrical producer, music director, art educator, dance instructor, singer, and businessperson
- Partner: Gabriel Ortiz de Zevallos
- Children: 1

María Denisse Dibós Silva (born 15 April 1967) is a Peruvian actress, theatrical producer, music director, art educator, dance instructor, singer and businessperson.

== Career ==
She is creator and director of "Preludio Asociación Cultural", with which she has produced several musicals and plays since 1997. This musicals are adaptations of Broadway originals productions with respective rights and permissions.

Denise trained as a concert pianist (master in classical music) in California, USA for 8 years.

Dibós also worked as a teacher of the Faculty of Communication Arts and the Pontifical Catholic University of Peru and in Teatro de la Universidad Católica (TUC).

The musical The Boy from Oz was released in May 2013, starring Marco Zunino as Allen and produced by "Preludio A.C.". It was the first Spanish language adaptation of this musical.

== Personal life ==
In March 2011, she gave birth to her first daughter named Paloma, from her relationship with economist Gabriel Ortiz de Zevallos.

== Theatre works ==
Year	Title	Credited as			
Year	Title	Producer ("Preludio")	Music director	Actress	Role
1985	Luces de Broadway			✔	Various roles
1997	The Sound of Music	✔		✔	Maria von Trapp
1999	A Chorus Line	✔	✔	✔	Cassie Ferguson
2000	El musical	✔	✔	✔	Various roles
2001	Macbeth			✔	Witch
2001–2002	El mago del país de las maravillas	✔			
2002	La bahía de Niza	✔		✔	Sofia Yepileva
2002	La vaca, la capa y la zapatilla	✔	✔		
2003	Gorditas en la calle			✔	Martina
2003	Charlie and the Chocolate Factory	✔			
2003	Ángeles	✔	✔	✔	Uriel/Aniel
2004	El Principito	✔	✔		
2005	Enrique V	✔			
2005	Charlie and the Chocolate Factory	✔			
2005	Sacco y Vanzetti	✔			
2005	La corporación	✔		✔	Various roles
2006	Jesucristo Superstar	✔	✔		
2007	The Secret Garden	✔	✔		
2008	Don Quijote de la Mancha, el musical	✔	✔		
2008–2009	A Funny Thing Happened on the Way to the Forum		✔		
2009	El Principito	✔	✔		
2009	Cabaret	✔	✔	✔	Fraulein Kost
2010	El musical 2010	✔	✔	✔	Various roles
2010	La Cage aux Folles		✔		
2010	The Vagina Monologues			✔	Performer
2011	Amor sin barreras (West Side Story)	✔	✔		
2012	Chicago	✔	✔	✔	Roxie Hart
2012	Company	✔			
2013	The Boy From Oz	✔	✔	✔	Marion Woolnouhg
2013	Mimí y el monstruo de la noche	✔			

== Filmography ==
TV
Year	Title	Role	Notes
1999	Apocalipsis		Lead role
1999	Girasoles para Lucía	Sabrina Di Fernese	
2001	Cazando a un millonario	Carolina Chávez	
2004	Eva del Edén	Wife slave seller	Guest star
2006	Esta sociedad	Graciela de Rodríguez-Ugarteche	
2008	Esta sociedad 2	Graciela de Rodríguez-Ugarteche	
2009	El show de los sueños: reyes del show	Guest judge	19 December episode
2012	Operación triunfo	Herself	Academy director
2012	El Gran Show 2012 (season 1)	Herself	Contestant (2nd place)
2013	Al Fondo Hay Sitio	Anita Miller	
2020	Te volveré a encontrar	Rosa María Ferrara Lizarazo de Valdemar "Nanita"	
2023-2024	Papá en apuros	Emilia Santillana	
2026	Los otros Concha	Victoria Dubois	Season 2
Films
Year	Title	Role	Notes
2008	Dioses	Claudia	
2023	A Giant Adventure	Anahi / Guardian Spider	Voice role
2025	To Die For	Carolina	
