= Ebelin Ortiz =

Peruvian actress, television presenter, and singer

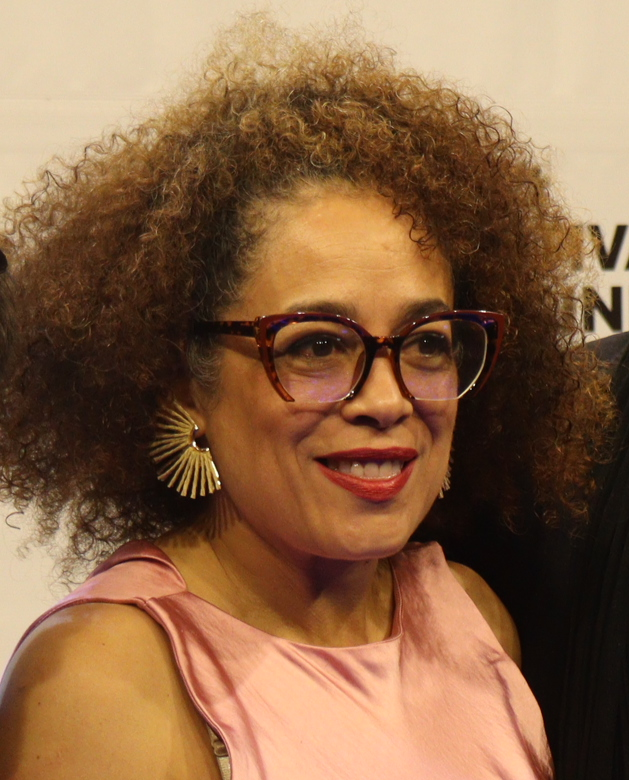
- Ortiz at the 29th Lima Film Festival (2025).
- Born: Francisca Ebelin Cebelin Ortiz González; 5 February 1971 (age 55); Lima, Peru
- Occupations: Actress, presenter, singer

Francisca Ebelin Cebelin Ortiz González (born 5 February 1971), known as Ebelin Ortiz, is a Peruvian actress, television presenter, and singer.

== Career ==
Ebelin Ortiz began her artistic career as "Burbujita" in the children's cast of Yola Polastri. Later she participated in various theatrical productions, improvisations, one-woman shows, and the telenovelas Leonela, muriendo de amor, Cosas del amor, Pobre Diabla, Soledad, and Eva del Edén.

Ortiz hosted the family program Nuestra Casa on Frecuencia Latina in 2005.

In 2006, she played social activist María Elena Moyano in the miniseries Viento y Arena, based on the history of the Villa El Salvador district.

In 2008, Ortiz participated in the reality show Bailando por un Sueño. Next, she starred in the miniseries Magnolia Merino, based on the public life of the television host Magaly Medina, which was widely criticized by followers of Medina.

In 2009 she debuted as a singer with Negra Soy, a repertoire of Afro-Peruvian music that was presented by the Centro Cultural Negro Continuo, and released her first self-titled album. The same year she competed on the Gisela Valcárcel reality show El Show de los sueños, where she took fourth place.

In 2011, she performed in the telenovela La Perricholi as Petronila.

As part of the cast of Chronicle of a Death Foretold, Ortiz traveled to Colombia to present the play at the 13th Ibero-American Theater Festival of Bogotá, which was held from 23 March to 8 April 2012.

In 2012 she performed in the musical Hairspray as one of the Dynamites, under the direction of Juan Carlos Fisher. On television, she appeared in the telenovela La Tayson, corazón rebelde. Back in the theater, she participated in the musical comedy Te odio amor mío, directed by Alberto Ísola.

In 2013 she presented the one-woman show Esa costilla frágil and had a role in the film The Gospel of the Flesh.

== Filmography ==
=== Telenovelas and dramatic series ===
- Leonela, muriendo de amor (1997) as Rosa
- Cosas del amor (1998) as Juanita
- Pobre Diabla (2000) as Norma
- Soledad (2001) as La Caribeña
- Teatro desde el teatro (2003–2006)
- Eva del Edén (2004) as María Angola
- Viento y arena (2005) as María Elena Moyano
- Esta sociedad (2006) as Rosaura
- Esta sociedad 2 (2008) as Rosaura
- La pre (2008) as Lady Toro
- La Fuerza Fénix (2008) as Sonia
- Magnolia Merino (2008–2009) as Magnolia Merino
- La Perricholi (2011) as Petronila
- La Tayson, corazón rebelde (2012) as Julieta
- Solamente milagros (2013), episode "Mujer o madre" as Celeste
- Goleadores (2014)
- Natalia (2017) as Carmen
- Súper Ada (2024) as Enriqueta "Quitita" Palomino

=== TV programs ===
- Hola Yola
- Por Primera Vez (1997)
- Nuestra Casa (2005)
- Bailando por un Sueño, Heroine / 7th place (2008)
- El show de los sueños, Heroine / 4th place (2009)
- Casi Ángeles (2010)

=== Films ===
- Los Herederos (2005)
- The Gospel of the Flesh (2013)
- Youtuber Dad (2019)
- Ramón and Ramón (2024)
- To Die For (2025) as Violeta

== Theater ==
- La Capa, La Vaca y La Zapatilla
- 4x4: Cuentos a todo terreno (2007)
- Rebelión de los Chanchos (2007)
- Viga Bulla
- Recontrahamlet (2008)
- La Corporación (2008)
- Esa frágil costilla (2008)
- Amor sin amantes (2009)
- Noises Off (2009)
- Amores de un siglo (2009)
- Jarana (2010)
- The Vagina Monologues (2010)
- Chronicle of a Death Foretold (2011–2012) as María Alejandrina Cervantes/Hermana de Bayardo San Román
- Hairspray (2012) as Member of the Dynamites
- Te odio amor mío (2012)
- Esa costilla frágil (2013), one-woman show
- Mamma Mia (2017)
