= Gisela (magazine) =

Peruvian monthly magazine

Gisela is a Peruvian monthly magazine, founded by TV host Gisela Valcárcel. It has been online-only magazine since January 2016.

== History and profile ==
Founded in 1993, the magazine was sold nationwide and became one of the most popular magazines in the country and one of the most read in metropolitan Lima (94,000 readers) and the third most read by women (79,500 readers)

In December 2008, after 15 years of circulation, the magazine was suspended because Valcárcel was working hard in Los Reyes de la Pista (Perú) but was relaunched in November 2010 under a new editorial team.

It had women's tips including: Fashion, business, cooking, erotism, dieting and actors' news.

In January 2016 the last print edition of Gisela was published. It was redesigned as an online-only magazine.
