= El Gran Show season 7 =

El Gran Show
- Season 7
- Hosted by: Gisela Valcárcel; Aldo Díaz; Óscar López Arias
- Judges: Morella Petrozzi; Pachi Valle Riestra; Alexis Grullón
- Celebrity winner: Jhoany Vegas
- Professional winner: Pedro Ibáñez
- No. of episodes: 13

Release
- Original network: América Televisión
- Original release: August 25 – November 17, 2012

Season chronology
- ← Previous; Season 6 Next → Season 8

Season one of the 2012 edition of El Gran Show premiered on August 25, 2011.

From this season, celebrities would no longer dance with dreamers, but with professional dancers who at the same time would be their choreographers with whom they would compete to help a charity.

On November 17, 2012, actress & model Jhoany Vegas and Pedro Ibáñez were declared the winners, actress & singer Denisse Dibós and Eduardo Pastrana finished second, while tennis player Macs Cayo and Diana Follegati were third.

== Cast ==
=== Couples ===
On August 22, the 14 celebrities that would participate in the season were announced, even though there were a total of 13 couples because Bettina Oneto and her daughter Shantall Young Oneto formed a trio during the competition along with the professional dancer José Morello, although later Bettina would leave the competition for personal issues.

After the retirement of Bettina Oneto, the bullfighter Alfonso de Lima also left the competition in week 7, being replaced by the actor Nikko Ponce.

Celebrity	Notability (known for)	Professional partner	Status
Fabio Ubierna	Evangelical pastor	Jacqueline Alfaro	Eliminated 1st on September 16, 2012
Andrés "Balán" Gonzales	Former football player	Alexandra Flores	Eliminated 2nd on October 6, 2012
Korina Rivadeneira	Model & actress	Emanuel Colombo	Eliminated 3rd on October 13, 2012
Valia Barak	Journalist & TV host	Angelo Cano	Eliminated 4th on October 20, 2012
Shantall Young Oneto	Singer & actress	José Morello	Eliminated 5th on October 20, 2012
Waldir Sáenz	Former football player	Alejandra Sánchez	Eliminated 6th on October 27, 2012
Nikko Ponce	Model & actor	Lisette Martell	Eliminated 7th on October 27, 2012
Daniela Sarfati	Al Fondo Hay Sitio actress	Sergio Lois	Eliminated 8th on November 3, 2012
Areliz Benel	Al Fondo Hay Sitio actress	Rodrigo Viola	Eliminated 9th on November 10, 2012
Andrés "Andy V" Olano	TV personality	Stephany Gamonal	Eliminated 10th on November 17, 2012
Macs Cayo	Tennis player	Diana Follegati	Third place on November 17, 2012
Denisse Dibós	Actress & singer	Eduardo Pastrana	Runner-up on November 17, 2012
Jhoany Vegas	Actress & model	Pedro Ibáñez	Winners on November 17, 2012

=== Host and judges ===
Gisela Valcárcel and Aldo Díaz returned as hosts, while Óscar López Arias replaced Christian Rivero as co-host. Morella Petrozzi, Pachi Valle Riestra and the VIP Jury returned as judges, while former MDO singer Alexis Grullón replaced Carlos Alcántara. On September 15, former judge Carlos Cacho joined the panel as a guest judge, replacing Grullón.

== Scoring charts ==
Couple	Place	1	2	3	4	5	6	7	8	9	10	11	12	13	
Couple	Place	1	2	3	4	5	6	7	8	9	10	11	12	Top 4	Top 3
Jhoany & Pedro	1	31	34	34	36	33	33	36	38	36	39	69	80	76	+35=111
Denisse & Eduardo	2	35	35	33	35	38	36	38	39	38	39	70	78	78	+40=118
Macs & Diana	3	30	34	32	35	39	39	40	40	41	39	75	75	72	+37=109
Andy V & Stephany	4	27	28	29	30	33	36	36	38	38	34	59	60	67	
Areliz & Rodrigo	5	27	34	30	32	34	32	31	36	34	32	65	69		
Daniela & Sergio	6	31	30	31	33	34	36	36	38	37	33	66			
Nikko & Lisette	7	26	27	32	29	31	31	34	35	31	34				
Waldir & Alejandra	8	33	28	30	34	33	33	41	37	36	37				
Shantall & José	9	32	30	35	34	34	34	35	35	36					
Valia & Angelo	10	28	29	31	33	32	40	36	34	34					
Korina & Emanuel	11	27	33	30	37	35	39	33	38						
Balán & Alexandra	12	21	30	27	25	37	28	38							
Fabio & Jacqueline	13	23	22	27	26										

Red numbers indicate the sentenced for each week
Green numbers indicate the best steps for each week
the couple was eliminated that week
the couple was safe in the duel
the couple was eliminated that week and safe with a lifeguard
the winning couple
the runner-up couple
the third-place couple

=== Average score chart ===
This table only counts dances scored on a 40-point scale.

Rank by average	Place	Couple	Total points	Number of dances	Average
1	2	Denisse & Eduardo	628	17	36.9
2	3	Macs & Diana	624	17	36.7
3	1	Jhoany & Pedro	598	17	35.3
4	11	Korina & Emanuel	273	8	34.1
5	6	Daniela & Sergio	404	12	33.7
6	9	Shantall & José	302	9	33.6
7	8	Waldir & Alejandra	335	10	33.5
8	10	Valia & Angelo	296	9	32.9
9	5	Areliz & Rodrigo	451	14	32.2
10	4	Andy V & Stephany	506	16	31.6
11	7	Nikko & Lisette	310	10	31.0
12	12	Balán & Alexandra	205	7	29.3
13	13	Fabio & Jacqueline	98	4	24.5

=== Highest and lowest scoring performances ===
The best and worst performances in each dance according to the judges' 40-point scale are as follows:

Dance	Highest scored dancer(s)	Highest score	Lowest scored dancer(s)	Lowest score
Latin pop	Macs Cayo	40	Juan Sotomayor	21
Reggaeton	Macs Cayo	39	Areliz Benel	27
Salsa	Korina Rivadeneira	37	Andrés "Andy V" Olano	27
Merengue	Denisse Dibós	39	Fabio Ubierna	23
Cumbia	Denisse Dibós	36	Fabio Ubierna	22
Disco	Shantall Young Oneto	35	Andrés "Balán" Gonzales	27
Jazz	Macs Cayo	40	Alfonso de Lima	32
Rumba flamenca	Fabio Ubierna	27	—	—
Pachanga	Valia Barak	39	Andrés "Balán" Gonzales	25
Bollywood	Andrés "Balán" Gonzales	37	Areliz Benel	30
World dances	Waldir Sáenz; Macs Cayo	40	Areliz Benel	30
Samba	Waldir Sáenz	40	Jhoany Vegas	37
Hip-hop	Macs Cayo	40	Nikko Ponce	31
Rock and roll	Denisse Dibós	38	—	—
Guaracha	Jhoany Vegas	36	—	—
Jive	Nikko Ponce	34	Andrés "Andy V" Olano	29
Quickstep	Denisse Dibós	36	—	—
Cha-cha-cha	Macs Cayo	37	—	—
Adagio	Jhoany Vegas; Denisse Dibós	38	Andrés "Andy V" Olano	30
K-pop	Jhoany Vegas	40	Areliz Benel	35
Freestyle	Jhoany Vegas; Denisse Dibós	40	Andrés "Andy V" Olano	36
Foxtrot	Denisse Dibós	40	Jhoany Vegas	35

=== Couples' highest and lowest scoring dances ===
Scores are based upon a potential 40-point maximum.

Couples	Highest scoring dance(s)	Lowest scoring dance(s)
Jhoany & Pedro	K-pop & Freestyle (40)	Reggaeton (31)
Denisse & Eduardo	Freestyle & Foxtrot (40)	Disco & Salsa (33)
Macs & Diana	Paso doble, Hip-hop, Jazz & Latin pop (40)	Salsa (30)
Andy V & Stephany	Reggaeton & Twist (37)	Cumbia (27)
Areliz & Rodrigo	Pachanga, Salsa & K-pop (35)	Reggaeton (27)
Daniela & Sergio	Jazz (38)	Cumbia (30)
Nikko & Lisette	Hip-hop (35)	Latin pop (26)
Waldir & Alejandra	Samba (40)	Disco (30)
Shantall & José	Salsa (36)	Cumbia (30)
Valia & Angelo	Pachanga (39)	Salsa (28)
Korina & Emanuel	Latin pop (39)	Latin pop (27)
Balán & Alexandra	Bollywood (37)	Latin pop (21)
Fabio & Jacqueline	Rumba flamenca (27)	Cumbia (22)

== Weekly scores ==
Individual judges' scores in the charts below (given in parentheses) are listed in this order from left to right: Morella Petrozzi, Alexis Grullón, Pachi Valle Riestra, VIP Jury.

=== Week 1: First Dances ===
The couples danced cumbia, latin pop, merengue, reggaeton or salsa. This week, none couples were sentenced.

Due to personal issues, Bettina Oneto could not be present in the live show while Andrés "Balán" Gonzales was replaced by the politician, Juan Sotomayor.

Running order

Couple	Scores	Dance	Music	Result
Korina & Emanuel	27 (6, 6, 7, 8)	Latin pop	"Mujer Latina"—Thalía	Safe
Jhoany & Pedro	31 (7, 7, 8, 9)	Reggaeton	"Ella Se Arrebata"—Latin Fresh	Safe
Valia & Angelo	28 (6, 6, 6, 10)	Salsa	"Las Cajas"—Joe Arroyo	Safe
Macs & Diana	30 (7, 7, 7, 9)	Salsa	"Aguanile"—Marc Anthony	Safe
Alfonso & Lisette	26 (5, 6, 6, 9)	Latin pop	"Dame Más"—Ricky Martin	Safe
Juan & Alexandra	21 (5, 4, 5, 7)	Latin pop	"Baila, Baila"—Chayanne	Safe
Waldir & Alejandra	32 (8, 8, 7, 9)	Salsa	"Ven Morena"—Oscar D'León	Safe
Denisse & Eduardo	35 (8, 8, 9, 10)	Salsa	"Magdalena, Mi Amor (Quimbara)"—DLG feat. Ivy Queen	Best steps
Fabio & Jacqueline	23 (4, 6, 5, 8)	Merengue	"En el Cielo No Hay Hospital"—Juan Luis Guerra	Safe
Andy V & Stephany	27 (6, 7, 6, 8)	Cumbia	"La Caderona"—Los Villacorta	Safe
Daniela & Sergio	31 (7, 8, 7, 9)	Reggaeton	"Bon, Bon"—Pitbull	Safe
Areliz & Rodrigo	27 (6, 6, 7, 8)	Reggaeton	"The Anthem"—Pitbull feat. Lil Jon	Safe
Shantall & José	32 (7, 8, 7, 10)	Salsa	"La Rebelión"—Joe Arroyo	Safe

=== Week 2: Cumbia Night ===
The couples danced cumbia.

Running order

Couple	Scores	Dance	Music	Result
Jhoany & Pedro	33 (8, 8, 7, 10)	Cumbia	"La Escobita"—Marisol y La Magia del Norte	Safe
Alfonso & Lisette	27 (6, 7, 6, 8)	Cumbia	"No te Metas con Mi Cucu"—Hermanos Yaipén	Sentenced
Shantall, Bettina & José	30 (7, 7, 7, 9)	Cumbia	"La Amante"—Grupo 5	Safe
Daniela & Sergio	30 (7, 7, 7, 9)	Cumbia	"Bonita y Mentirosa"—Los Mirlos	Safe
Waldir & Alejandra	28 (7, 7, 6, 8)	Cumbia	"Lejos de Tí"—Amaya Hermanos	Safe
Balán & Alexandra	30 (7, 8, 6, 9)	Cumbia	"Dos Locos"—Los Villacorta	Safe
Andy V & Stephany	28 (6, 7, 6, 9)	Cumbia	"El Gusano"—Papillon	Safe
Areliz & Rodrigo	34 (8, 9, 8, 9)	Cumbia	"El Tao Tao"—Grupo 5	Safe
Fabio & Jacqueline	22 (3, 5, 5, 9)	Cumbia	"Te Vas"—Grupo 5	Sentenced
Korina & Emanuel	33 (8, 9, 7, 9)	Cumbia	"Canalla"—Marisol y La Magia del Norte	Safe
Valia & Angelo	29 (6, 7, 6, 10)	Cumbia	"Motor y Motivo"—Grupo 5	Safe
Macs & Diana	34 (8, 8, 8, 10)	Cumbia	"Cariñito"—Los Hijos del Sol	Safe
Denisse & Eduardo	36 (9, 9, 8, 10)	Cumbia	"Así Son los Hombres"—Marina Yafac	Best steps

=== Week 3: Disco Night ===
The couples (except those sentenced) danced disco.

Running order

Couple	Scores	Dance	Music	Result
Korina & Emanuel	31 (6, 8, 7, 10)	Disco	"Disco Inferno"—The Trammps	Safe
Macs & Diana	32 (7, 8, 7, 10)	Disco	"Ring My Bell"—Anita Ward	Safe
Valia & Angelo	31 (7, 8, 7, 9)	Disco	"I Will Survive"—Gloria Gaynor	Safe
Waldir & Alejandra	30 (7, 7, 7, 9)	Disco	"Don't Stop 'Til You Get Enough"—Michael Jackson	Safe
Balán & Alexandra	27 (6, 7, 6, 8)	Disco	"Stayin' Alive"—Bee Gees	Sentenced
Alfonso & Lisette	32 (8, 7, 8, 9)	Jazz*	"In the Middle"—Kazaky	Safe
Fabio & Jacqueline	27 (5, 6, 6, 10)	Rumba flamenca*	"Bamboléo" / "Baila Me"—Gipsy Kings	Sentenced
Shantall, Bettina & José	35 (8, 9, 8, 10)	Disco	"On the Radio"—Donna Summer	Best steps
Andy V & Stephany	29 (6, 8, 6, 9)	Disco	"You Should Be Dancing"—Bee Gees	Safe
Denisse & Eduardo	33 (8, 8, 8, 9)	Disco	"Voulez-Vous"—ABBA	Safe
Areliz & Rodrigo	30 (7, 7, 7, 9)	Disco	"Boogie Wonderland"—Earth, Wind & Fire	Safe
Daniela & Sergio	31 (7, 8, 7, 9)	Disco	"Le Freak"—Chic	Safe
Jhoany & Pedro	34 (8, 8, 8, 10)	Disco	"Last Dance"—Donna Summer	Safe

*The duel

- Alfonso & Lisette: Safe
- Fabio & Jacqueline: Eliminated (but safe with the lifeguard)

=== Week 4: Salsa Night ===
Individual judges' scores in the chart below (given in parentheses) are listed in this order from left to right: Morella Petrozzi, Carlos Cacho, Pachi Valle Riestra, VIP Jury.

The couples (except those sentenced) danced salsa.

Running order

Couple	Scores	Dance	Music	Result
Jhoany & Pedro	35 (9, 8, 8, 10)	Salsa	"La Salsa Vive"—Tito Nieves	Safe
Denisse & Eduardo	35 (9, 7, 9, 10)	Salsa	"Brujería"—El Gran Combo de Puerto Rico	Safe
Andy V & Stephany	30 (8, 7, 7, 8)	Salsa	"Fiesta de Pilito"—El Gran Combo de Puerto Rico	Safe
Balán & Alexandra	25 (5, 7, 4, 9)	Pachanga*	"Verano Azul"—Juan Magán	Sentenced
Fabio & Jacqueline	26 (5, 6, 6, 9)	Pachanga*	"Lo Que No Sabes Tú"—Chino & Nacho	—
Shantall, Bettina & José	34 (8, 8, 8, 10)	Salsa	"En Barranquilla Me Quedo"—Joe Arroyo	Safe
Waldir & Alejandra	34 (8, 8, 8, 10)	Salsa	"Quimbombó"—Hermanos Moreno	Safe
Daniela & Sergio	33 (8, 8, 8, 9)	Salsa	"El Preso"—Fruko y sus Tesos	Safe
Areliz & Rodrigo	32 (7, 8, 8, 9)	Salsa	"Mi Gente"—Héctor Lavoe	Safe
Alfonso & Lisette	29 (7, 6, 6, 10)	Salsa	"Un Verano en Nueva York"—El Gran Combo de Puerto Rico	Sentenced
Valia & Angelo	33 (8, 8, 7, 10)	Salsa	"Cali Pachanguero"—Grupo Niche	Safe
Macs & Diana	35 (9, 8, 8, 10)	Salsa	"Que Se Sepa"—Roberto Roena	Safe
Korina & Emanuel	37 (10, 9, 9, 9)	Salsa	"Que Cosa Tan Linda"—Oscar D'León	Best steps

*The duel

- Balán & Alexandra: Safe
- Fabio & Jacqueline: Eliminated

=== Week 5: Reggaeton Night ===
Individual judges' scores in the charts below (given in parentheses) are listed in this order from left to right: Morella Petrozzi, Alexis Grullón, Pachi Valle Riestra, Jurado VIP.

The couples (except those sentenced) danced reggaeton and a danceathon of cumbia.

Due to personal issues, Bettina Oneto left the competition, leaving Shantall & José as a couple from next week.

Running order

Couple	Scores	Dance	Music	Result
Balán & Alexandra	37 (9, 9, 9, 10)	Bollywood*	"Jai Ho! (You Are My Destiny)"—A. R. Rahman & The Pussycat Dolls	Safe
Alfonso & Lisette	31 (7, 9, 7, 8)	Bollywood*	"Ishq Kamina"—Alka Yagnik & Sonu Niigaam	Safe
Korina & Emanuel	35 (8, 9, 8, 10)	Reggaeton	"El Ritmo No Perdona (Prende)"—Daddy Yankee	Safe
Shantall, Bettina & José	34 (8, 9, 8, 9)	Reggaeton	"Veo veo"—Los Guajiros	Safe
Andy V & Stephany	32 (7, 8, 8, 9)	Reggaeton	"Ahora Es"—Wisin & Yandel	Sentenced
Jhoany & Pedro	32 (9, 7, 7, 9)	Reggaeton	"Quema, Quema"—Aldo & Dandy	Safe
Waldir & Alejandra	33 (8, 8, 8, 9)	Reggaeton	"Agárrala"—Trebol Clan	Safe
Daniela & Sergio	34 (9, 9, 7, 9)	Reggaeton	"Ella Me Levantó"—Daddy Yankee	Safe
Valia & Angelo	32 (7, 8, 7, 10)	Reggaeton	"Culipandeo"—DJ Warner	Sentenced
Areliz & Rodrigo	34 (9, 8, 8, 9)	Reggaeton	"Rakata"—Wisin & Yandel	Safe
Macs & Diana	39 (10, 10, 9, 10)	Reggaeton	"Impacto"—Daddy Yankee feat. Fergie	Best steps
Denisse & Eduardo	38 (9, 10, 9, 10)	Reggaeton	"Mayor Que Yo"—Luny Tunes	Safe
Valia & Angelo; Areliz & Rodrigo; Macs & Diana; Alfonso & Lisette; Denisse & Eduardo; Balán & Alexandra; Andy V & Stephany; Korina & Emanuel; Waldir & Alejandra; Daniela & Sergio; Jhoany & Pedro; Shantall & José	1; 1 1	Cumbia (The danceathon)	"Corazón de Piedra" / "Carta Final" / "Te Eché al Olvido"—Tony Rosado e Internacional; Pacífico	

*The duel

- Balán & Alexandra: Eliminated (but safe with the lifeguard)
- Alfonso & Lisette: Safe

=== Week 6: Latin Pop Night ===
The couples (except those sentenced) danced latin pop and a danceathon of festejo.

Running order

Couple	Scores	Dance	Music	Result
Jhoany & Pedro	32 (8, 8, 8, 8)	Latin pop	"Boom, Boom"—Chayanne	Safe
Shantall & José	33 (8, 8, 8, 9)	Latin pop	"Let's Get Loud" / "Bailar Nada Más"—Jennifer Lopez	Safe
Waldir & Alejandra	32 (8, 7, 8, 9)	Latin pop	"Livin' la Vida Loca"—Ricky Martin	Safe
Valia & Angelo	39 (10, 10, 9, 10)	Pachanga*	"Balada Boa"—Gusttavo Lima	Best steps
Andy V & Stephany	36 (10, 10, 7, 9)	Pachanga*	"Pa' los Coquitos"—La Coco Band	Safe
Balán & Alexandra	28 (6, 7, 6, 9)	Latin pop	"Oye el Boom"—David Bisbal	Sentenced
Denisse & Eduardo	36 (9, 9, 8, 10)	Latin pop	"Explota mi corazón" / "Hay que venir al sur"—Raffaella Carrà	Safe
Macs & Diana	39 (10, 10, 9, 10)	Latin pop	"Soy Sexy y Lo Sabes"—Ricky Martin	Safe
Daniela & Sergio	36 (9, 9, 8, 10)	Latin pop	"Rabiosa"—Shakira	Safe
Areliz & Rodrigo	32 (8, 8, 7, 9)	Latin pop	"Arrasando"—Thalía	Safe
Korina & Emanuel	39 (10, 10, 9, 10)	Latin pop	"Tu Veneno"—Natalia Oreiro	Safe
Alfonso & Lisette	31 (7, 7, 7, 10)	Latin pop	"Torero"—Chayanne	Sentenced
Valia & Angelo; Areliz & Rodrigo; Macs & Diana; Alfonso & Lisette; Denisse & Eduardo; Balán & Alexandra; Andy V & Stephany; Korina & Emanuel; Waldir & Alejandra; Daniela & Sergio; Jhoany & Pedro; Shantall & José	1 1; 1	Festejo (The danceathon)	"Jipi Jay"—Pepe Vásquez	

*The duel

- Valia & Angelo: Safe
- Andy V & Stephany: Eliminated (but safe with the lifeguard)

=== Week 7: World Dances Night ===
The couples performed the world dances and a team dance of axé.

Due to personal issues, Alfonso de Lima withdrew the competition, this being his last dance. From next week, the actor Nikko Ponce replaced him.

Running order

Couple	Scores	Dance	Music	Result
Areliz & Rodrigo	30 (7, 8, 7, 8)	(United Arab Emirates) Belly dance	"Sidi Mansour"—Saber Rebaï	Sentenced
Andy V & Stephany	35 (8, 9, 8, 10)	(Bolivia) Saya	"Soy Caporal"—Los Kjarkas	Safe
Shantall & José	34 (8, 9, 8, 9)	(Colombia) Cumbia	"La Pollera Colorá"—Wilson Choperena	Safe
Balán & Alexandra	37 (9, 9, 9, 10)	(Peru) Marinera	"La Concha Perla"—Banda de la PNP	—
Alfonso & Lisette	34 (8, 8, 8, 10)	(Cuba) Salsa	"Temba, Tumba, Timba"—Los Van Van	Safe
Daniela & Sergio	35 (9, 9, 9, 8)	(Argentina) Tango	"El Tango de Roxanne"—from Moulin Rouge!	Safe
Jhoany & Pedro	35 (9, 8, 9, 9)	(Cuba) Mambo	"Mambo No. 8"—Pérez Prado	Safe
Denisse & Eduardo	38 (9, 10, 9, 10)	(Italy) Tarantella	"Tarantella Napoletana" / "Be Italian"—Fergie	Safe
Waldir & Alejandra	40 (10, 10, 10, 10)	(Brazil) Samba	"Magalenha"—Sérgio Mendes feat. Carlinhos Brown	Best steps
Macs & Diana	40 (10, 10, 10, 10)	(Spain) Paso doble	"España cañí"—Pascual Marquina Narro	Safe
Korina & Emanuel	33 (8, 8, 9, 8)	(France) Can-can	"Galop Infernal"—Vanessa-Mae	Sentenced
Valia & Angelo	36 (9, 8, 9, 10)	(United States) Country	"Cotton Eye Joe"—Rednex	Safe
Valia & Angelo; Macs & Diana; Alfonso & Lisette; Denisse & Eduardo; Korina & Emanuel; Daniela & Sergio	0	Axé (Team "Asia")	"Dança Da Mãozinha"—Axé Bahia	
Areliz & Rodrigo; Balán & Alexandra; Andy V & Stephany; Waldir & Alejandra; Jhoany & Pedro; Shantall & José	1	Axé (Team "Agua Dulce")	"Dança Da Manivela"—Axé Bahia	

*The duel

- Balán & Alexandra: Eliminated
- Alfonso & Lisette: Safe

=== Week 8: Celebrity's Pick Night ===
The couples (except those sentenced) performed a dance chosen by celebrities and a team dance of jazz.

Running order

Couple	Scores	Dance	Music	Result
Shantall & José	34 (9, 9, 8, 8)	Jazz	"Where Have You Been"—Rihanna	Sentenced
Andy V & Stephany	37 (9, 9, 9, 10)	Reggaeton	"Noche de Entierro (Nuestro Amor)"—Luny Tunes	Safe
Waldir & Alejandra	36 (9, 9, 9, 9)	Salsa	"La Carátula"—La Charanga Habanera	Safe
Korina & Emanuel	38 (10, 10, 8, 10)	Jazz*	"Starships"—Nicki Minaj	—
Areliz & Rodrigo	35 (9, 8, 8, 10)	Jazz*	"Danza Kuduro" / "Taboo"—Don Omar	Safe
Nikko & Lisette	35 (9, 8, 9, 9)	Hip-hop	"I'm a Slave 4 U"—Britney Spears / "Beep"—The Pussycat Dolls	Sentenced
Denisse & Eduardo	39 (10, 10, 9, 10)	Merengue	"El Kikikí"—Rikanera	Safe
Macs & Diana	40 (10, 10, 10, 10)	Hip-hop	"Bleeding Love"—Leona Lewis / "Personal Jesus"—Depeche Mode	Best steps
Jhoany & Pedro	36 (9, 8, 9, 10)	Salsa	"La Malanga"—Eddie Palmieri	Safe
Daniela & Sergio	38 (9, 10, 9, 10)	Jazz	"Toxic"—Britney Spears	Safe
Valia & Angelo	34 (8, 8, 8, 10)	Disco	"Born to Be Alive"—Patrick Hernandez	Sentenced
Valia & Angelo; Macs & Diana; Denisse & Eduardo; Nikko & Lisette; Korina & Emanuel; Daniela & Sergio	0	Jazz (Team A)	"Mickey"—Toni Basil "Give Me All Your Luvin'"—Madonna feat. Nicki Minaj y M.I.A.	
Areliz & Rodrigo; Andy V & Stephany; Waldir & Alejandra; Jhoany & Pedro; Shantall & José	1	Jazz (Team B)	"Yo Te Quiero Dar"—La Mosca Tsé - Tsé	

*The duel

- Korina & Emanuel: Eliminated
- Areliz & Rodrigo: Safe

=== Week 9: Eras Night ===
The couples (except those sentenced) performed one unlearned dance representing different historical eras. In the little train, the participants faced dancing strip dance.

Running order

Couple	Scores	Dance (Era)	Music	Result
Areliz & Rodrigo	32 (8, 9, 7, 8)	Cumbia (2000s)	"Te Vas" / "Me Enamoré de Ti" / "El Embrujo"—Grupo 5	Safe
Denisse & Eduardo	38 (10, 10, 9, 9)	Rock and roll (1950s)	"Jailhouse Rock"—Elvis Presley	Safe
Andy V & Stephany	37 (9, 9, 9, 10)	Jazz (1960s)	"Despeinada"—Palito Ortega / "Chin chin"—Jimmy Santi	Safe
Shantall & José	36 (9, 9, 8, 10)	Salsa*	"La Negra Tiene Tumbao"—Celia Cruz	—
Valia & Angelo	34 (8, 9, 8, 8)	Pachanga*	"Sopa de Caracol"—Banda Blanca	—
Nikko & Lisette	31 (8, 8, 7, 8)	Hip-hop*	"U Can't Touch This"—MC Hammer	Sentenced
Waldir & Alejandra	35 (8, 9, 8, 10)	Merengue (1990s)	"Está Pegao" / "El Tiburón"—Proyecto Uno	Sentenced
Daniela & Sergio	36 (9, 10, 8, 9)	Hip-hop (2010s)	"Goin' In"—Jennifer Lopez feat. Flo Rida	Safe
Macs & Diana	40 (10, 10, 10, 10)	Jazz (1980s)	"Beat It" / "Bad"—Michael Jackson	Best steps
Jhoany & Pedro	36 (9, 9, 9, 9)	Guaracha (1970s)	"El Alacrán"—La Sonora Matancera	Sentenced

The little train
Participants	Judges' votes	Dance	Music	Winners
Women	Areliz, Stephany, Alejandra	Strip dance	"Lady Marmalade"—Christina Aguilera, Lil' Kim, Mýa y Pink	Areliz, Stephany, Alejandra (1 pt)
Men	Macs, Rodrigo, Sergio	Strip dance	"I'm Too Sexy"—Right Said Fred	Macs, Rodrigo, Sergio (1 pt)

*The duel

- Shantall & José: Eliminated
- Valia & Angelo: Eliminated
- Nikko & Lisette: Safe

=== Week 10: Tribute to Gisela ===
The couples (except those sentenced) performed a dance to pay tribute to Gisela Valcárcel. In the little train, the participants faced dancing strip dance.

Running order

Couple	Scores	Dance	Music	Result
Macs & Diana	39 (10, 10, 9, 10)	Jazz	"Music"—Madonna	Best steps
Waldir & Alejandra	35 (8, 9, 8, 10)	Cumbia*	"Tabaco y Ron" / "Candela"—Grupo 5	—
Jhoany & Pedro	36 (9, 9, 8, 10)	Jazz*	"Cabaret" / "All That Jazz"—from Cabaret	Best steps
Nikko & Lisette	34 (8, 9, 8, 9)	Jive*	"Candyman"—Christina Aguilera	—
Andy V & Stephany	34 (8, 9, 7, 10)	Latin pop	"Vamos pa' la Conga"—Ricardo Montaner	Safe
Denisse & Eduardo	39 (10, 10, 9, 10)	Merengue	"Las Avispas"—Juan Luis Guerra	Best steps
Daniela & Sergio	33 (7, 9, 7, 10)	Latin pop	"La Candela"—Ángela Carrasco & Celia Cruz	Sentenced
Areliz & Rodrigo	31 (7, 8, 7, 9)	Disco	"I Will Survive"—Gloria Gaynor	Sentenced

The little train
Participants	Judges' votes	Dance	Music	Winners
Women	Jhoany, Areliz, Alejandra	Strip dance	"Crazy in Love"—Beyoncé feat. Jay-Z	Jhoany, Areliz, Alejandra (1 pt)
Men	Pedro, Pedro, Pedro	Strip dance	"Party Rock Anthem" / "Sexy and I Know It"—LMFAO	Pedro (2 pts)

*The duel

- Waldir & Alejandra: Eliminated
- Jhoany & Pedro: Safe
- Nikko & Lisette: Eliminated

=== Week 11: Quarterfinals ===
The couples danced salsa, a ballroom dance (except those sentenced) and a danceathon of huayno.

Running order

Couple	Scores	Dance	Music	Result
Denisse & Eduardo	33 (7, 8, 8, 10)	Salsa	"Las Cajas"—Joe Arroyo	Safe
Denisse & Eduardo	36 (9, 9, 9, 10)	Quickstep	"Sparkling Diamonds"—Nicole Kidman	Safe
Jhoany & Pedro	32 (7, 8, 8, 9)	Salsa	"I Love Salsa"—N'Klabe	Sentenced
Jhoany & Pedro	37 (9, 10, 8, 10)	Samba	"Jazz Machine"—Black Machine	Sentenced
Andy V & Stephany	27 (5, 6, 6, 10)	Salsa	"Quimbara"—Celia Cruz & Johnny Pacheco	Safe
Andy V & Stephany	29 (6, 7, 7, 9)	Jive	"La Plaga"—Enrique Guzmán	Safe
Daniela & Sergio	33 (7, 9, 8, 9)	Salsa	"Bam Bam"—Joe Arroyo	—
Daniela & Sergio	33 (7, 8, 8, 10)	Jazz*	"Sube a Mi Nube" / "Papi Deja de Fumar"—from Nubeluz	—
Areliz & Rodrigo	35 (7, 10, 9, 9)	Salsa	"Aguanile"—Héctor Lavoe y Willie Colón	Sentenced
Areliz & Rodrigo	30 (7, 8, 6, 9)	Pachanga*	"Inténtalo (Me Prende)"—3Ball MTY feat. El Bebeto & América Sierra	Sentenced
Macs & Diana	36 (8, 9, 9, 10)	Salsa	"La Rebelión"—Joe Arroyo	Best steps
Macs & Diana	37 (9, 9, 9, 10)	Cha-cha-cha	"Sway"—The Pussycat Dolls	Best steps
Areliz & Rodrigo; Macs & Diana; Denisse & Eduardo; Andy V & Stephany; Daniela & Sergio; Jhoany & Pedro	1; 1; 1	Huayno (The danceathon)	"Princesita Huanca"—Jean Pierre Magnet and Alex Acuña	

*The duel

- Daniela & Sergio: Eliminated
- Areliz & Rodrigo: Safe

=== Week 12: Semifinals ===
The couples danced adagio, a sung dance (except those sentenced) in which the celebrities sang in the middle of the performance, and a danceathon of pachanga. In the little train, the participants faced dancing strip dance. This week, none couples were sentenced.

Running order

Couple	Scores	Dance	Music	Result
Macs & Diana	34 (8, 8, 8, 10)	Adagio	"Abrázame Muy Fuerte"—Juan Gabriel	Safe
Macs & Diana	40 (10, 10, 10, 10)	Latin pop	"Este Ritmo Se Baila Así"—Chayanne	Safe
Denisse & Eduardo	36 (9, 9, 8, 10)	Adagio	"Cuando Se Acaba el Amor"—Guillermo Dávila	Safe
Denisse & Eduardo	39 (10, 10, 9, 10)	Latin pop	"Colgando en Tus Manos"—Carlos Baute y Marta Sánchez	Safe
Andy V & Stephany	30 (7, 8, 6, 9)	Adagio	"Yo Soy Una Mujer"—Maggie Carles	Safe
Andy V & Stephany	28 (6, 7, 7, 8)	Reggaeton	"The Anthem"—Pitbull feat. Lil Jon	Safe
Jhoany & Pedro	38 (9, 10, 9, 10)	Adagio	"Tan Enamorados"—Ricardo Montaner	Best steps
Jhoany & Pedro	40 (10, 10, 10, 10)	K-pop*	"Ring Ding Dong"—SHINee / "Fantastic Baby"—Big Bang	Best steps
Areliz & Rodrigo	34 (8, 9, 8, 9)	Adagio	"Para Dormir Contigo"—Aranza	—
Areliz & Rodrigo	35 (9, 9, 7, 10)	K-pop*	"Sorry, Sorry"—Super Junior / "Gangnam Style"—Psy	—
Areliz & Rodrigo; Macs & Diana; Denisse & Eduardo; Andy V & Stephany; Jhoany & Pedro	1	Pachanga (The danceathon)	"Bailan Rochas y Chetas"—Nene Malo	

The little train
Participants	Judges' votes	Dance	Music	Winners
Women	Denisse, Jhoany, Diana	Strip dance	"Telephone"—Lady Gaga feat. Beyoncé	Denisse, Jhoany, Diana (1 pt)
Men	Eduardo, Eduardo, Eduardo	Strip dance	"SexyBack"—Justin Timberlake	Eduardo (2 pt)

*The duel

- Jhoany & Pedro: Safe
- Areliz & Rodrigo: Eliminated

=== Week 13: Finals ===
On the first part, the couples danced adagio and freestyle.

On the second part, the final three couples danced foxtrot.

Running order (Part 1)

Couple	Scores	Dance	Music	Result
Macs & Diana	33 (8, 8, 7, 10)	Adagio	"Solo Importas Tú"—Franco De Vita	Safe
Macs & Diana	39 (10, 10, 9, 10)	Freestyle	"Electro Cumbia"	Safe
Jhoany & Pedro	36 (9, 9, 9, 9)	Adagio	"Te Sigo Amando"—Juan Gabriel	Safe
Jhoany & Pedro	40 (10, 10, 10, 10)	Freestyle	"Say My Name" / "Lose My Breath"—Destiny's Child	Safe
Denisse & Eduardo	38 (10, 9, 9, 10)	Adagio	"Vivo por ella"—Andrea Bocelli & Marta Sánchez	Safe
Denisse & Eduardo	40 (10, 10, 10, 10)	Freestyle	"Smooth Criminal"—Michael Jackson	Safe
Andy V & Stephany	31 (8, 8, 6, 9)	Adagio	"Corazón de piedra"—Lucía Méndez	Eliminated
Andy V & Stephany	36 (10, 8, 8, 10)	Freestyle	"Peruano de Corazón" / "Que Se Sepa"—Roberto Roena	Eliminated

Running order (Part 2)

Couple	Scores	Dance	Music	Result
Jhoany & Pedro	35 (9, 8, 8, 10)	Foxtrot	"Hit the Road Jack"—Ray Charles	Winners
Macs & Diana	37 (9, 9, 9, 10)	Foxtrot	"Big Spender"—Shirley Bassey	Third place
Denisse & Eduardo	40 (10, 10, 10, 10)	Foxtrot	"Crazy Little Thing Called Love"—Queen	Runner-up

== Dance chart ==
The celebrities and professional partners will dance one of these routines for each corresponding week:

- Week 1: Cumbia, latin pop, merengue, reggaeton or salsa (First Dances)
- Week 2: Cumbia (Cumbia Night)
- Week 3: Disco (Disco Night)
- Week 4: Salsa (Salsa Night)
- Week 5: Reggaeton & the danceathon (Reggaeton Night)
- Week 6: Latin pop & the danceathon (Latin Pop Night)
- Week 7: One unlearned dance & team dances (World Dances Night)
- Week 8: One unlearned dance & team dances (Celebrity's Pick Night)
- Week 9: One unlearned dance & the little train (Eras Night)
- Week 10: One unlearned dance & the little train (Tribute to Gisela)
- Week 11: Salsa, ballroom dances & the danceathon (Quarterfinals)
- Week 12: Adagio, sung dance, the danceathon & the little-train (Semifinals)
- Week 13: Freestyle, adagio & foxtrot (Finals)

Couple	Week 1	Week 2	Week 3	Week 4	Week 5	Week 6	Week 7	Week 8	Week 9	Week 10	Week 11		Week 12		Week 13		
Jhoany & Pedro	Reggaeton	Cumbia	Disco	Salsa	Reggaeton	Latin pop	Mambo	Salsa	Guaracha	Jazz	Salsa	Samba	Adagio	K-pop	Freestyle	Adagio	Foxtrot
Denisse & Eduardo	Salsa	Cumbia	Disco	Salsa	Reggaeton	Latin pop	Tarantella	Merengue	Rock and roll	Merengue	Salsa	Quickstep	Adagio	Latin pop	Freestyle	Adagio	Foxtrot
Macs & Diana	Salsa	Cumbia	Disco	Salsa	Reggaeton	Latin pop	Paso doble	Hip-hop	Jazz	Jazz	Salsa	Cha-cha-cha	Adagio	Latin pop	Freestyle	Adagio	Foxtrot
Andy V & Stephany	Cumbia	Cumbia	Disco	Salsa	Reggaeton	Pachanga	Saya	Reggaeton	Jazz	Latin pop	Salsa	Jive	Adagio	Reggaeton	Freestyle	Adagio	
Areliz & Rodrigo	Reggaeton	Cumbia	Disco	Salsa	Reggaeton	Latin pop	Belly dance	Jazz	Cumbia	Disco	Salsa	Pachanga	Adagio	K-pop			
Daniela & Sergio	Reggaeton	Cumbia	Disco	Salsa	Reggaeton	Latin pop	D2B48Cgo	Jazz	Hip-hop	Latin pop	Salsa	Jazz					
Nikko & Lisette	Latin pop	Cumbia	Jazz	Salsa	Bollywood	Latin pop	Salsa	Hip-hop	Hip-hop	Jive							
Waldir & Alejandra	Salsa	Cumbia	Disco	Salsa	Reggaeton	Latin pop	Samba	Salsa	Merengue	Cumbia							
Shantall & José	Salsa	Cumbia	Disco	Salsa	Reggaeton	Latin pop	Cumbia	Jazz	Salsa								
Valia & Angelo	Salsa	Cumbia	Disco	Salsa	Reggaeton	Pachanga	Country	Disco	Pachanga								
Korina & Emanuel	Latin pop	Cumbia	Disco	Salsa	Reggaeton	Latin pop	Can-can	Jazz									
Balán & Alexandra	Latin pop	Cumbia	Disco	Pachanga	Bollywood	Latin pop	Marinera										
Fabio & Jacqueline	Merengue	Cumbia	Rumba flamenca	Pachanga													

Modalities of competition
Couple	Week 5	Week 6	Week 7	Week 8	Week 9	Week 10	Week 11	Week 12	
Jhoany & Pedro	Cumbia	Festejo	Axé	Jazz	Strip dance	Strip dance	Huayno	Pachanga	Strip dance
Denisse & Eduardo	Cumbia	Festejo	Axé	Jazz	Strip dance	Strip dance	Huayno	Pachanga	Strip dance
Macs & Diana	Cumbia	Festejo	Axé	Jazz	Strip dance	Strip dance	Huayno	Pachanga	Strip dance
Andy V & Stephany	Cumbia	Festejo	Axé	Jazz	Strip dance	Strip dance	Huayno	Pachanga	Strip dance
Areliz & Rodrigo	Cumbia	Festejo	Axé	Jazz	Strip dance	Strip dance	Huayno	Pachanga	Strip dance
Daniela & Sergio	Cumbia	Festejo	Axé	Jazz	Strip dance	Strip dance	Huayno		
Nikko & Lisette	Cumbia	Festejo	Axé	Jazz	Strip dance	Strip dance			
Waldir & Alejandra	Cumbia	Festejo	Axé	Jazz	Strip dance	Strip dance			
Shantall & José	Cumbia	Festejo	Axé	Jazz	Strip dance				
Valia & Angelo	Cumbia	Festejo	Axé	Jazz	Strip dance				
Korina & Emanuel	Cumbia	Festejo	Axé	Jazz					
Balán & Alexandra	Cumbia	Festejo	Axé						
Fabio & Jacqueline									

Highest scoring dance
Lowest scoring dance
Gained bonus points for winning this dance
Gained no bonus points for losing this dance
In Italic indicate the dances performed in the duel
