= Eres mi bien =

- Genre: Telenovela
- Created by: Jaime Nieto
- Written by: Franco Iza; Joss Montenegro; Ximena Basadre; María Inés Vargas; Rasec Barragán; Mariana Silva; Luis Francisco Palomino
- Directed by: Jorge Tapia; Toño Vega; Luis Barrios
- Starring: Mónica Sánchez; David Villanueva; Paul Martin
- Theme music composer: Estanis Mogollón
- Opening theme: "Eres mi bien" by Álvaro Rod
- Composer: José Lindley
- Country of origin: Peru
- Original language: Spanish
- No. of seasons: 1
- No. of episodes: 139

Production
- Executive producers: César Arana Díaz; Nataly Mendoza Rodríguez
- Producers: Carol Ríos Polastri; Guillermo Lay Arcos
- Camera setup: Multi-camera
- Production company: Chasqui Producciones

Original release
- Network: Latina Televisión
- Release: 18 August 2025 – 3 March 2026

Eres mi bien is a Peruvian telenovela created by Jaime Nieto. It aired on Latina Televisión from 18 August 2025 to 3 March 2026. The series stars Mónica Sánchez, David Villanueva and Paul Martin.

== Premise ==
Valeria Vargas is a woman whose love and family life is disrupted by the arrival of two men who insist on being present in her daily life. On one hand, Rubén represents the connection to the past: he is her ex-partner and father of her children, Fiorella and Toño. On the other hand, Mauricio, a businessman, symbolizes success, dreams of change, and the emergence of new opportunities that challenge Valeria's apparent tranquility. Valeria is rejected by Leticia, Mauricio's mother, upon learning that Valeria sells ceviche, also because Leticia wants to try to get Mauricio back with Claudia, the mother of his daughter.

== Cast ==
- Mónica Sánchez as Valeria Vargas
- David Villanueva as Mauricio Fernando Piaggio Montes de Oca / Mauricio Fernando Piaggio Carbajal
- Paul Martin as Rubén Pacheco Salas
- Diana Quijano as Leticia Montes de Oca vda. de Piaggio
- Teddy Guzmán as Rebeca Carbajal
- Roberto Moll as Vicente Braulio Pacheco Bravo
- Nathalia Vargas as Francisca Carbajal
- Pierina Carcelén as Claudia Martínez Bustamante
- César Ritter as Alfonso "Foncho" Polar
- Natalia Salas (later replaced by Ximena Díaz) as Mercedes Eugenia "Meche" Gómez de López
- Claudio Calmet as Emerson López
- Fiorella Luna as Roxana Gómez
- Diego Villarán as Alan López Gómez
- Valeria Ríos as Fiorella Pacheco Vargas
- Vasco Rodríguez as Sebastián Barrios Domenack
- Claudio Rubio as Antonio "Toñito" Pacheco Vargas
- Valeria Conroy as Cayetana Benavides
- Leandro Hernández as David Alejandro López Gómez
- Stefano Meier as Ricardo Vega Solar
- Fiorella Pennano as Lucía Salazar
- Martina Peñaloza as Miranda Piaggio Martínez / Miranda Martínez Bustamante / Miranda Molina Martínez
- Julián Legaspi as Renato Molina
- Stephanie Orúe as Azucena Gómez

== Reception ==
The telenovela premiered on 18 August 2025, positioning itself in sixth place in the audience during primetime with a percentage of 7.4 points, being surpassed by the series Al fondo hay sitio airing on América Televisión.
