= Bailando por un Sueño (Peruvian TV series) season 3 =

Bailando por un Sueño
- Season 3
- Hosted by: Gisela Valcárcel; Giancarlo Chichizola
- Judges: Joaquín Vargas; Carlos Cacho; Pachi Valle Riestra; Morella Petrozzi
- Celebrity winner: Delly Madrid
- Professional winner: José Luis Campos
- No. of episodes: 7

Release
- Original network: Panamericana Televisión
- Original release: November 15 – December 27, 2008

Season chronology
- ← Previous; Season 2

The Peruvian version of Reyes de la pista (The Kings of the Dance floor) is a spin-off or continuation of the successful reality television musical "Bailando por un Sueño" being the premiere date of November 15, 2008, hosted by Gisela Valcárcel The programs will be broadcast on Saturdays at 10 pm (−5 GMT) by Panamericana Television live from the studios Monitor, located in the Lima district of San Borja.

The winners were Delly Madrid and José Luis Campos.

== Concept and schedule ==
Reyes de la pista is a musical realityand then direct "Dancing for a Dream "', where they face in a dance competition eight couples who occupied the first four places in the first two seasons of that show. Each pair is made up of a "dreamer" and a famous or "hero". The pair won under this program will be a prize of 30769 dollars and represent the Peru in Second International Dance Championship, which will possibly take place in Argentina year 2009.

Reyes de la pista, like his predecessor, will be part of theprime timeon Saturday Panamericana Television, will air from 10:00 pm, lasting about two hours and a half, and also include the transmission of micro daily news from Monday to Friday throughout the regular programming of this television channel.

=== Jury ===
1. Joaquin Vargas (Theatre director, Television producer and director of the new virtual version of Nubeluz)
2. Morella Petrozzi (professional dancer)
3. Carlos Cacho (Make-up artist for television and Host)
4. Pachi Valle Riestra (professional dancer)

== Participants ==
Celebrity	Occupation	Professional partner	From The Season / Place	Status
Karina Calmet	Actress and Model	Cromwell Manrique	1º / Third	Eliminated 1st on The second gala
Sergio Galliani	Actor	Leydi Marchinares	1º / Fourth	Eliminated 2nd on The third gala
Norka Ramirez	Actress	Nahum Osorio	2º / Third	Eliminated 3rd on The fourth gala
Gustavo Mayer	Actor and TV Host	Carolina Guerra	1º / First	Eliminated 4th on The fifth gala
Marco Zunino	Actor and Singer	Jardenia Ugaz	2º / First	Eliminated 5th on The sixth gala
Mónica Sánchez	Actress	Alex Pétricek	2º / Second	Third Place on the Finale
Marisol Aguirre	Actress, TV Host and Model	Alan Ascuña	1º / Second	Second Place on the Finale
Delly Madrid	Model and Dancer	José Luis Campos	2º / Fourth	Winners on the Finale
