= Seminario =

Seminario is a surname. Notable people with the surname include:

- Diego Seminario (born 1989), Peruvian actor and industrial designer
- Juan Seminario (born 1936), Peruvian footballer
- Miguel Grau Seminario (1834–1879), Peruvian naval officer
