= To Die For (2025 film) =

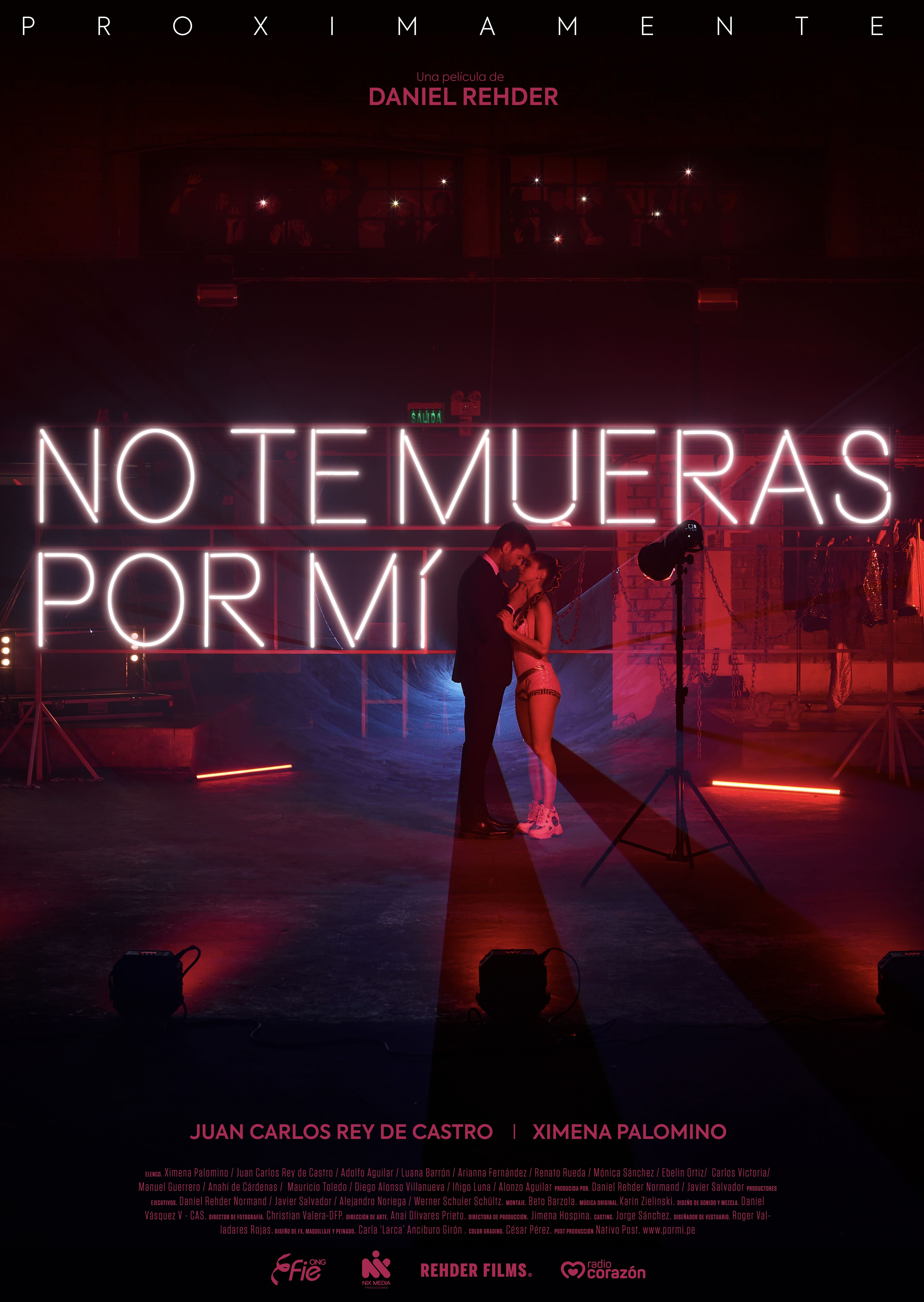
- Theatrical release poster
- Spanish: No te mueras por mí
- Directed by: Daniel Rehder
- Written by: Daniel Rehder
- Produced by: Daniel Rehder; Javier Salvador
- Starring: Juan Carlos Rey de Castro; Ximena Palomino
- Cinematography: Christian Valera
- Edited by: Beto Barzola
- Music by: Karin Zielinski
- Production companies: Rehder Films; Nix Media; Rebeca Producciones
- Release date: April 3, 2025
- Running time: 104 minutes
- Country: Peru
- Language: Spanish

To Die For (Spanish: No te mueras por mí) is a 2025 Peruvian romantic thriller drama film written, co-produced and directed by Daniel Rehder. Starring Juan Carlos Rey de Castro and Ximena Palomino accompanied by Mónica Sánchez, Anahí de Cárdenas, Ebelin Ortiz, Denise Dibós, Luana Barron, Adolfo Aguilar and Arianna Fernandez.

== Synopsis ==
Emma is a young television star who believes she's found love with Cristóbal, a successful businessman. However, what begins as a promising romance soon turns into a nightmare.

== Cast ==
The actors participating in this film are:

- Juan Carlos Rey de Castro as Cristóbal
- Ximena Palomino as Emma
- Mónica Sánchez as Laura
- Anahí de Cárdenas as Lucy
- Denisse Dibós as Carolina
- Arianna Fernández as Alexia
- Ebelin Ortiz as Violeta
- Renato Rueda as Pepe
- Adolfo Aguilar as Marc Anthony
- Carlos Victoria as Huertas
- Luana Barrón as Luciana

== Production ==
Principal photography began on May 19, 2023, in Lima, Peru.

== Release ==
To Die For premiered on April 3, 2025, in Peruvian theaters, then screened the following day at the 64th Cartagena Film Festival, and is scheduled for theatrical release on May 15, 2025, in Colombian theaters.
