= Al fondo hay sitio =

Peruvian comedy telenovela

- Also known as: There's Room in the Back
- Genre: Comedy-drama; Thriller; Tragicomedy
- Created by: Efraín Aguilar; Gigio Aranda
- Written by: Gigio Aranda
- Directed by: Toño Vega
- Opening theme: Al fondo hay sitio (Tommy Portugal)
- Ending theme: Al fondo hay sitio (Tommy Portugal)
- Composer: Tommy Portugal
- Country of origin: Peru
- Original language: Spanish
- No. of seasons: 13
- No. of episodes: 2145+

Production
- Executive producer: Efraín Aguilar
- Production locations: Lince District, Lima, Peru
- Running time: 42-45 minutes Monday to Friday at 20:00 PET (UTC-5)

Original release
- Network: América Televisión
- Release: March 30, 2009 – December 5, 2016
- Release: June 22, 2022 – present

Al fondo hay sitio (Spanish: There's Room in the Back) is a Peruvian comedy television series released in March 2009 by Efraín Aguilar. The story revolves around two very different families living in the same neighbourhood, the Gonzales (a low-class family who have just moved from Huamanga, Ayacucho) and the Maldini (a rich and powerful family with a high economic status). It is one of the most popular telenovelas in Peru and is now being shown in Ecuador, Bolivia, Paraguay and Uruguay.

== Plot ==
=== Season 1 ===
One of the most exclusive areas of Lima, "Las Lomas", is shaken up by the arrival of the Gonzales family from Huamanga, Ayacucho. The family settled in a half-built house they inherited. Their peasant traditions infuriate the neighbors, especially the family living opposite them, the Maldinis. The Maldinis are the richest family in all of Las Lomas, however, they still cannot find a way to get rid of the newcomers. Amid this confrontation, the Ferrands, another neighboring family, befriend the newcomers.

Pepe and Tito receive an offer from Miguel Ignacio for $120,000. Pepe was about to accept, but just his mother and the family of his deceased brother arrived, so he decided to reject M. Ignacio's offer. Nelly realizes that her son was going to sell the house, without giving the part of it to Lucho, so they decide to go to Miguel Ignacio to reject her offer. This angry one swears that sooner or later he will destroy that house.

Joel, Charo's son, meets Fernanda, Miguel Ignacio's daughter, in whom he falls in love with her at first sight, and greets her by dancing and asking her name in badly pronounced English. Which he dislikes and runs away from the new neighbor. Meanwhile, Grace, Charo's youngest daughter, can't stand life in Lima and prefers to return to Huamanga, where she left her crush Kevin, so she decides to elope at night from home. But he is run over by Nicolás, the eldest son of M. Ignacio and Isabella. Terrified he asks Peter for help and they take her to the nearest clinic. Peter forces Nicolás to stay with Grace, she wakes up in the morning and falls in love with him at first sight, Nicolás lies to the doctor who is in love with him so they won't press charges.

Miguel Ignacio is unfaithful to Isabella, with his secretary named Liliana, one day they meet Pepe and Tito on the bus, the latter falls in love with Liliana and tries to woo her, which she is indifferent to this, because for her Tito is a poor boy, unlike Miguel Ignacio, who promised to leave his family for her.

Fernanda, has a lover who does not belong to the same sociocultural class that they usually frequent, so they reject that relationship, especially Miguel Ignacio, who on a date with Liliana, hears Fabricio talking on the phone that he would take his girlfriend to a "telo" (a hostel that couples go to), which Miguel Ignacio disliked and ordered Peter to throw him out of the house. Fernanda in revenge decides to use Joel to anger her family.

Camila, Fernanda's best friend, gives her advice to invite Joel to her house, which Fernanda dislikes but accepts. Her family gets angry at the beginning, but Peter advises them that only a rebellious stage and the best thing is that they continue with Fernanda's game. The Gonzales arrive at night to celebrate the "union" of the couple. Fernanda realizes that things are getting out of hand, Joel tries to kiss her, but Fernanda pushes him away and confesses that she only did that to annoy her family, which depresses Joel and her family is offended by the house of the Maldini. Meanwhile Liliana and Tito both reconcile and confirm their wedding to the Gonzales, to Miguel Ignacio's disgust.

Minutes later, Liliana decides not to marry Tito on the very day of her marriage and leaves him planted at the altar. She then she goes to the construction company and asks Miguel Ignacio to elope together. But Miguel Ignacio warns her that he will never marry her, because he does not want to abandon his family. Consequently, Liliana, regretful of everything that has happened, decides to move away from "Las Lomas" forever, after having lost the opportunity to be happy because of her ambition. But it was too late, because Isabella, after discovering that they were both lovers, decides to divorce Miguel Ignacio and throws him out of the house.

Francesca gives Fernanda a scholarship to Boston University, in order to separate her from Joel, meanwhile Charo and Raúl kiss and start a romance after so long. In the last scene, Claudia Zapata, the former secretary of the construction company, reviews some documents, and finally discovers the secret of Francesca Maldini.

=== Season 2 ===
When Peter discovers that Claudia is manipulating Mike and convinces him to leave Fernanda, Claudia kidnaps Peter, shoots him in the chest and leaves him for dead. Claudia attempts to flee the country with money embezzled from the company but is spotted by Mike at the airport, who is also leaving after his attempts to win back Fernanda fail. Having heard of Peter's plight, Mike prevents Claudia from boarding the plane and she is subsequently arrested. While Peter is recovering in the hospital, Francesca overhears Peter in his sleep and under the effects of anesthesia saying that he has always loved her.

Peter recovers only to find out his secret love is well known by everybody and Francesca does not share the same feeling. Soon everybody finds out because Gilberto, Nelly's husband, accidentally tells her. Determined to make Francesca look bad, she tells the whole family. At the same time, Grace and the newly changed Cayetana are planning Gianfranco's (Grace's boyfriend of whom she is convinced will make her forget about Nicolas) birthday which is sought out to be huge. While Cayetana seems to have changed, she plans the party as a trap for Grace and Nicolas (who returns to being her boyfriend after learning that she "changed"). It was when dancing that she reveals Grace's love for Nicolas and proceeds to pours a large amount of mud on them, embarrassing them in front of all the high society guests at the party. Minutes later, Cayetana was locked up in a madhouse by his parents, and Grace then breaks up with Gianfranco knowing that she can never forget about Nicolas.

Meanwhile, Mike succeeds in winning back Fernanda because she thinks it is over and decides he was the best thing that happened to her. Joel is also starting to reconstruct his love life because his co-worker Andrea is in love with him. He, on the other hand, is convinced that she is almost like a guy friend to him and that there will be nothing more. After learning that, Andrea tells him and Joel finally returns her love. Even though she really loves him, she is insecure and is afraid that Joel will go running back to Fernanda.

One day Claudia calls Mike, and makes him believe that she had a mental breakdown which led her to commit her crime. At first, Mike does not believe in her, but at the end he starts visiting her. Unfortunately it is all a trap because somebody that Claudia knows takes a picture of Mike and Claudia kissing. Then Claudia sends that picture to Fernanda and Francesca causing the breakup of Mike's relationship with Fernanda for the second time and after that Mike leaves Lima. Meanwhile, Miguel Ignacio, falls in love with Gladys and they start a project by selling juanes. With a lot of effort they are able to open a restaurant called "¡Ay, La Gladys!" (Lit. Oh Gladys!). But he has to face a problem: Regaining the love of his children who are ashamed of their father. After finding out that his father is poor and is working in a market with Gladys, Nicolas learns to accept it. Fernanda, however, does not. After regaining the love of his daughter, Miguel Ignacio's restaurant is burned down and he loses everything. Later, viewers learn that the fire was caused by Claudia's friend from prison. After losing the restaurant Miguel Ignacio, overwhelmed by the debts, decides to escape by leaving Gladys.

While Miguel Ignacio is trying to escape, he receives a call from Claudia and finds out that she was the one who orchestrated the destruction of his restaurant. After realizing that he is helpless Miguel Ignacio decides to join Claudia. After his bold decision, Claudia tells him how to accomplish what he wants more than anything in the world - to get back at Francesca. She tells him a secret and Miguel Ignacio uses it to blackmail Francesca into giving him back his old job as General Manager. Meanwhile, Luciana, Raul and Susu's daughter return for Raul and Charo's wedding. Grace feels threatened because Nicolas and Luciana used to be a couple. When a rumor is spread by Isabella and Susu that Nicolas and Luciana are back as a couple, Grace furiously tells Nicolas everything she feels for him. After days without talking, Nicolas realizes that he loves Grace and that they should not be friends, but should date instead. After sharing a kiss with Grace, he leaves for her mother's wedding. On his way there, he almost crashes into a truck.

Charo marries Raul in Las Lomas, and Isabella does the same with Leonardo in a hotel in Paracas. He dedicates a song to Isabella, to which they dance. When everything is over he reads a message that Claudia gave him and throws it into the water, revealing he is the brother of Claudia. Back at Las Lomas, everything seems to go well until an unexpected guest (Lucho Gonzales) arrives at the Gonzales' house, leaving everyone in shock and making Charo faint.

Francesca, overwhelmed by the blackmailing of Miguel Ignacio, leaves the hotel with Peter following. When they are in the car, she starts to cry and reveals her secret to Peter: Isabella is not her daughter.

=== Season 3 ===
The first episode describes how Charo and Lucho's marriage was like 22 years ago, and what happens afterwards. Miguel Ignacio gains back his original post at the construction management office and calls Gladys, rekindling their relationship.

Days later, Charo decides to board a plane with Raul for a getaway, but she ends up deserting him and heads back home, as she feels that she is abandoning her children. Later, she finds Raul and tells him that she wants to leave with him, but he rejects her as he felt hurt after she had deserted him. They both get divorced, as conflicting relationships arise with Lucho's presence. Later, Raul meets Renata Newman, whom he starts a relationship with to forget about Charo. Charo, in return, goes back to being Lucho's wife, without knowing that he hides a secret from her.

Pepe, Tito, and Joel go to Rio de Janeiro, due to a website they joined. Later, Fernanda (out of jealousy towards the relationship that Joel has with another girl named Andrea) makes a blown-up picture of Joel making out with a girl he met in Rio. Consequently, Andrea breaks up with him. Claudia Zapata is released from prison, with every intention to make the people who hurt her pay.

In an act of vengeance, Isabella, along with Francesca and Peter, smothers Doña Nelly with paint. In retaliation, Nelly says that Isabella is not Francesca's real daughter in front of her, giving Francesca a panic attack, most of all because Isabella calls up her mysterious sister, Rafaella, to tell her the truth. Rafaella tells Isabella that she is neither the daughter of Francesca Maldini nor of Bruno Picasso, but they both love her as if she were their real daughter.

Claudia makes friends with Grace Gonzales, but later Grace realizes that Claudia was only trying to manipulate her. Peter, the Maldini's butler, later sees Claudia and Leonardo, Isabella's new husband, talking. This is something that makes him suspicious. Peter then leaves the Maldini house to go live in the Gonzales' due to "Madam" (his name for Francesca) and her mistrust of him. He then returns to his old post because Tito's mother, Maria Juana Smith, was harassing him, and because he knew that Francesca wouldn't really pay any attention to him.

Fernanda gets back together with Joel, a fact that infuriates Andrea and Lucas, Fernanda's ex-boyfriend, and both Andrea and Lucas wish to get revenge on Joel. Margarita, Grace's best friend, takes advantage of the whole situation and attempts to seduce Lucas, and they later become a couple.

Later in the series, Lucho's secret is revealed. On the day of the wedding in which he remarries Charo, three uninvited guests, a woman and her children, show up. The woman is revealed to be Lucho's lover, Reyna Pachas (Tatiana Astengo), whom Lucho met at a bar. Her children are twenty-year-old Shirley, a cute but superficial girl with a mean personality, and sixteen-year-old Jhonny, a kind and hard-working boy with a disciplined lifestyle. Everyone is completely shocked at the news, and the surprise eventually turns into rage, as the whole family is furious upon finding out that the reason why Lucho was gone for so long was because he was spending time with his "other" family. The wedding soon turns into a nightmare for everyone. It sparks much jealousy between the two families, especially in Grace and Shirley, as Grace and Shirley were both fully convinced that they were "daddy's little princess". When Shirley begins to sob about her father loving her other sister more, Lucho assures Shirley that she is the daughter most dear to him, a fact that Grace overhears, breaking her heart.

When Shirley and Jhonny are kicked out momentarily from the house while everyone inside fights, Nicolas catches Shirley's eye, and she falls madly in love with him. She has no idea that Nicolas was Grace's ex-boyfriend, but when she does find out, she doesn't let that stop her. She does everything she can to make him love her back, without noticing that Nicolas is uncomfortable with her smothering affection for him. Like daughter, like mother, Reyna also tries to seduce Miguel Ignacio, who has gotten back with Gladys and is expecting a baby boy. Gladys, feeling that she is unable to compete with Reyna, becomes jealous and resentful. When Gladys starts to accuse Miguel Ignacio that something is going on between him and Reyna, he fires Reyna's son Jhonny who was working for him as a janitor. When Reyna gets the news she tries to seduce Miguel into giving the job back to her son. She brings him a plate of sopa seca (a coastal dish popular in Ica, where Reyna hails from) but when she comes clear the table she breaks down and starts to cry. She tells Miguel that she does not know what she is going to do because of what Lucho did to her.

Miguel Ignacio, not knowing what to do, tells her that he will give her son his job back plus a rise and promotion. When she heard this she jumps up and hugs him resulting in Reyna giving Miguel Ignacio a kiss.

Season 3 closes at the day where Mariano Pendavis and Teresa are about to get married and Francesca appears in the middle of the wedding and flees with Mariano, leaving Teresa in despair after having her wedding ruined and the Gonzales family furious. Joel and Fernanda get secretly married. A mysterious man from province (who is later known to be Isabella's biological father) asks himself how his precious 'wawita' is. Miguel Ignacio leaves a business meeting to witness the birth of his son Otto, which Claudia appears at the last second to make her next move.

=== Season 4 ===
In the first episode, the Gonzales household is devastated as the wedding between Mariano and Teresa has been frustrated by the appearance of Francesca. Peter is devastated by hearing this from Gilberto. In a church, Joel and Fernanda get secretly married in order to prevent being separated by the Maldini family. Meanwhile, in the hospital, Miguel Ignacio and Gladys are happy as their son Otto was born, which Claudia kidnaps him afterwards and is given as ransom for 1 million soles ($286204.92). Miguel Ignacio and Raul head to the location where Otto is 'apparently' being held, only to watch the place explodes. Claudia successfully managed to trick Miguel Ignacio and Gladys and flees from the hospital, leaving the baby safe.

At the Gonzales household, Reina Pachas and their family claims 'by right' a place in the house, which started a long-lasting confrontation between Charo and Reina, and Shirley and Grace. Nelly heads to the Maldini household to explain the truth about Isabella.

Isabella Picasso is revealed to have been kidnapped as an infant and taken away from her biological family called the "Pampanuapas". Nelly reveals the secret to many people including Isabella. Francesca and Bruno were jealous they didn't have a child of their own, so Francesca faked a pregnancy and took a baby from the hospital. The real parents of Isabella arrive in the seventh episode and the mother, Chabela, serves as a maid to the Maldini family. She is told of the secret by Francesca's husband, Chabela cries of the bad news. She then informs Emiliano, the father of Isabella, of the discovery and they decide to report it to the police.

Charo and Raúl remarried and went on a trip to enjoy their honeymoon together, but when they returned they were scammed by Mabel Wilson for the purchase of the most luxurious mansion "Los Castillos de Las Lagunas". This fact causes that Raúl is in the ruin and loses all the rights of the producer.

Grace, then meets Gustavo Adolfo, a teacher and magician. Shirley is madly in love with him, but he in turn falls in love with Grace, beginning to relive the love triangles between the Gonzales sisters. Soon after, it is discovered that her parents are professional scammers. It is revealed that Gustavo Adolfo's parents were actually the ones who scammed Charo and Raúl with the purchase of "Los Castillos de Las Lagunas". Raúl, after hearing that, shocked by all this event, takes his revenge on Gustavo Adolfo. Mabel Wilson reappears, who cheated Raúl, approaches Gustavo Adolfo noting that they have a family relationship, it turns out that this is Gustavo Adolfo's sister-in-law, however Grace believes that she is his lover and Shirley ends up intensifying the misunderstanding by lying to him to Grace telling her that Gustavo Adolfo was already dating another girl from high school. Soon after, Grace finds out that Shirley was cheating on her about Gustavo Adolfo and they both end up coming back.

Fernanda and Joel remarry in civil law, but then something happens. Joel fell into a trap with 3 alleged dancers on his bachelor party, which is why Fernanda decided to end her marriage relationship with Joel, since she got tired of her relaxed life without responsibilities and without work living at the expense of her For that reason it was also the family that sadly pushed Fernanda to start her marriage breakdown, so much so that it cost her to fall into a devastated situation. Mike appears again, "El Maldito Gringo Atrasador", but this time as manager of Mía's father's company where Fernanda works. However, he decides to win her back from her so this will bring Joel more problems.

Pepe Gonzales is the majority shareholder of the construction company De Las Casas, because he made a deal with Claudia Zapata to save Don Gilberto's life, so now, apparently the Gonzales are millionaires and this would cause more conflicts with the Maldini. With her new economic position, Doña Nelly puts Gustavo Adolfo in jail because her sister-in-law Mabel Wilson cheated her with the story of the cruise in the Pyramids of Egypt, but Billy Bedoya, Gustavo Adolfo's father and Mabel Wilson's father-in-law, appears. that this helps to get him out of jail. However Billy Bedoya scams Raúl Del Prado with a house again, Grace ends up with Gustavo Adolfo because he never gave them Mabel's whereabouts. Shortly after Nicolás finds out that Gustavo Adolfo and Grace broke up and he decides to win her back and asks Charo to help him but she refuses to help him, shortly after Nicolás and Grace resume their romantic relationship with the help of Shirley and Rasec.

Joel and Fernanda are kidnapped by armed hitmen paid by Claudia Zapata, the Gonzalez and Maldini comforted each other of their potential impending execution. Joel and Fernanda escape with the help of Mike Miller and an anonymous text by Leonardo of the location of where they were kidnapped. And Claudia, disgusted about that rescue, flees again.

With all the money that Claudia gave them, the Gonzales decide to organize a "Caravan of Kindness" in the middle of Christmas, in order to give money to those most in need. But when they return home, they are seized by the bank for being in debt and wasting large amounts of money. They take from Pepe all the shares of the construction company, losing all the fortune granted. This time, economically, the family is poorer than before. As a consequence, Nelly and Gilberto leave "Las Lomas" to forget their financial misfortune.

The Pampanuapas enter the house of the Maldini family and accuse Francesca for kidnapping. They then brought two police officers to take Francesca to jail. Meanwhile, in a lawyer office, Mariano Pendeivis, the husband of Francesca finds out that Leonardo is the son of Fernando Llanos and the brother of the criminal Claudia Zapata. Knowing that Francesca is in mortal danger, he calls Peter to stay with her at all times as he will tell them of what he just found out. He walks quickly to an elevator, he enters and when the elevator doors opened, he sees Claudia Zapata. Claudia enters the elevator and presses the close door button, after the doors are closed, Claudia murders Mariano with two gunshots. After the murder, security cameras catch Claudia shooting Pendeivis and a police officer intercepts her attempting to escape. She is charged with murder and illegal possession of a gun. Francesca is escorted to a police station where her mugshot is taken and transported to a jail cell, she meets her longtime enemy Claudia Zapata. A terrified Francesca asks why she is there, Claudia tells her that they captured her like Francesca. Francesca says she will be out soon because Mariano will help her, Claudia reveals to her that her husband will not arrive because the reason she is in jail is because she murdered him. Francesca cries on the revelation.

Tito and Teresa have a secret affair and accidentally drank beer and slept together. Charo finds her ex-boyfriend Carlos Cabrera at a Christmas party dressed as Santa Claus.

Nicolás confesses to Rasec that he was intimate with Grace. In the last scene, Grace is seen very nervous, locked in the bathroom, with a pregnancy test in hand, ending the season with a cliffhanger, whether Grace ended up pregnant or not.

=== Season 5 ===
Nicolás and Fernanda find out that Francesca Maldini is in jail for stealing Isabella so Peter makes the decision to tell them the truth and they both find out Francesca's secret. Don Bruno pretends to be evicted so as not to be imprisoned like Francesca. After passing these events, the Gonzales and the Maldini prepare for the wake of Mariano Pendavis. Francesca is transferred to the Santa Mónica women's prison, in the presence of her family, who are totally devastated.

When Shirley was about to go to the Institute, she offers Grace a chifa that she did not eat at breakfast, Grace when she sees the chifa runs to the bathroom and Shirley follows her, in that same Grace tells everything to Shirley in confidence. Grace comments to Charito that she returned to Nicolás in her fear of not telling him the complete truth. Charo disapproves of his relationship with Nicolás. Meanwhile, Nicolás became a "meme" on social networks, especially on Facebook, the reason being his Andean origins.

Leonardo upon learning of Mariano's death decides to flee before being discovered by the clues that Claudia left, since he has been an accomplice of all her misdeeds.

On the other hand, Joel, in his despair when he finds out that Fernanda is going to marry Mike, meets with Andrea after 2 years, proposes to her and she accepts. Both begin to resume their romantic relationship. After Fernanda decides to postpone the marriage, a decision that is greeted with relief by Mike, Joel decides to do the same with Andrea, who threatens to jump off a boardwalk if he doesn't marry her.

Meanwhile, Raúl del Prado begins to feel jealousy and insecurity when he learns that Charo was reunited with his first love Carlos Cabrera. Carlos Cabrera holds a meeting for his birthday, to which Charo and Raúl are invited, and by mistake of the recipient of the invitation letter, where Luis Gonzales and wife were written, because Carlos thinks that Charo is still married to Lucho and Reina obliges Lucho to go to Carlos's party.

With 3 months pregnant, Grace decides to tell Nicolás once about her condition. Her when she finally does it on a weekend at the Maldini's beach house where they came accompanied by Rasec and Shirley. Unable to hide the truth anymore, Grace and Nicolás then tell her family about her pregnancy. Although at first Charo had a disappointed reaction, she ends up accepting and giving him her support. Meanwhile, Isabella upon hearing the news of her becomes indifferent to Nicolás and together with Miguel Ignacio they decide to give her a money check to get rid of Grace. However, Charo and Lucho reject and throw Isabella and Miguel Ignacio out of their house. The Gonzales decide to forcibly marry Nicolás to Grace after learning that she is pregnant, but on the day of the wedding Nicolás is kidnapped by M. Ignacio, Isabella and their nona who is the one who plans to kidnap Nicolás. The whole family believes that Nicolás planted Grace and did not want to marry, Raúl Del Prado decides to go look for Nicolás in Miami, because Fernanda tells Joel that Nicolás was there, but during his trip he meets Chris (Malu Costa), with whom he took some very compromising photos with Raúl.

However, Francesca Maldini leaves prison and is under house arrest, regretting her actions, decides to speak with Nicolás who now lives in the Gonzales house, but he refuses, Joel decides to woo Monserrat who tries to leave Las Lomas, because One of Reina's conditions to forgive Lucho was that Monserrat leave and never return, Charo does not let Monserrat leave Lucho tells him about the kiss but Charo is not very convinced Lucho tells him that he only protects her because Monserrat is as her employee, because lately only Monserrat is in charge of the housework. Consequently, Monserrat decides to leave, but at the terminal he realizes that he does not have the ticket to Monsefú. Joel meets her there and takes her to a hotel so that she can stay there. Monserrat feels alone in the Hotel el Cielo and escapes, without noticing she crosses a street and is run over in their luxurious car by Isabella and Leonardo, they grab her and take her to the house where, out of fear of being reported to Isabella, Francesca offers her a job, Monserrat doubts, but then realizes that he would live in front of Lucho and accepts the job. However, Reina believes that she is crazy because she sees monsefuanas everywhere but in reality, if it was Monserrat, Reina decides to go to Ica to cure her madness.

Without a doubt, Isabella is the only one who does not accept the Gonzales, Grace's son was in danger so this situation forces Francesca to escape from her house arrest, after Grace's danger passes, Francesca manages to return home without the law enforcement knowing that she escaped, shortly after Francesca with the help of her lawyer is released on probation.

On the other hand, Francesca decides to pay a visit to the Santa Monica prison and meets Claudia in the prison where Francesca was previously and does not hesitate to threaten her and remind her that she murdered Mariano Pen-Davis, finally ending with a phrase that intrigued many : "I am very good", as Monserrat always says, perhaps there will be a link between the two of them. Francesca inquires about the origins of Monserrat and threatens to report her for complicity with a criminal, to which Monserrat refuses to accept. Monserrat challenges Francesca, but she brings her lawyers home to blame her for complicity.

Carlos finds out that Charo still doesn't want to marry him, so he tries to talk about it but it doesn't work, so he says it's the same as someone else who told him the same thing, Charo thinks it's about Isabella, but it's actually Francesca But still he ends up with him forever. As a result, Isabella invites Carlos Cabrera to dinner at that moment they are interrupted by Doña Nelly to threaten Francesca not to mess with Carlos because he is Charo's boyfriend, then he leaves the Maldini house. Mike also confesses to Fernanda that he will not be able to marry her since he was in love with Andrea, she leaves Mike disappointed, Joel sees her and consoles her.

Peter returns from a trip and Leonardo reappears in the back of his car. However, he confesses to Isabella her true feelings and that he has never stopped loving her despite everything, Rafaella reconciles with Pepe, starting a new relationship.

Cayetana reappeared after the birth of Grace and Nicolás's daughter (Nelly Francesca). Leonardo turns himself in to the police and finally puts together a musical in jail. Monserrat receives a visit from who he claims to be the son of Rodolfo Rojas ("Peter"). Charo after learning that Raúl never cheated on him, goes to look for him at his apartment. But upon arrival, he finds a pretty woman in a robe with him.

=== Season 6 ===
It all begins with two moments, in 1958 and 1978, recounting the past of "Rodolfo Rojas" (Peter's real name) and how he finds out that he is a father. His son, Manolo, appears at the Maldini's house looking for Rodolfo Rojas and meets Monserrat with whom he will be getting along very well. On the other hand, Charo is sad because he found Raúl with a woman named Viviana and also, after Francesca and Carlos Cabrera's kiss they start a relationship. The return of Cayetana is also marked, trying to apologize to Nicolás, and informing him that she is no longer angry, thanks to two-year therapies. She would later return as Miguel Ignacio's love interest. It is also discovered that Doña Nelly changed her daughter's name to Nelly Francisca and was bothered by that (this would be reversed later). While everyone was in the hospital, Doña Nelly wins the lottery and in that she dies of a heart attack. On the other hand, Viviana meets Charo and offers her an oil commercial but she does not accept and takes it as a joke. Bruno plans to follow Francesca with Isabella and they discover that she is with Carlos Cabrera on a date. After what has happened, Carlos and Francesca make their relationship official but some do not agree except Fernanda. The police go to the Gonzales Pachas' house and want to see Lucho for beating "Yunguyano". Nobody knew what to do and Reina asks Monserrat to ask Francesca to call her lawyer. They manage to keep Lucho from going to jail but they have to pay a greater amount of money so they plan to rent the apartment from him and live on the other floor.

Reina and Charo face each other but Charo has won so he began to be freer. When Raúl sees Viviana and Carlos Cabrera talking, he aroused their jealousy and caused an argument with Viviana. Charo decides with Teresa to go out to a place and meets Raúl, Viviana and a businessman from the company. When they sit down, Charo dances with the businessman and Raúl has become jealous of him. When he returns home with Viviana the two argue and Viviana left and the Gonzales made fun of him. Then Raúl asked Charo for advice to win back Viviana, naively. Shortly after, it is discovered that Reina listens to Charo in the commercial that they have offered her, so what she did was disguise herself as her and when she went they accepted her for the commercial, to Charo's disgust.

Six months later, Joel meets Cayetana and they become friends. Nobody knows, but Reina sees them talking as over time they both become in love. However, Cayetana makes a Ranch to Joel without knowing what a “Ranch” is, Fernanda in a mocking moment makes him notice that a Ranch is a ranch party so she makes her family dress up as ranchers, shortly after in the Fiesta del Ranch Cayetana's parents appear, Sebastián Bogani (Rubén Martorell) and Marisienka Bogani (Marissa Minetti) at first they did not assimilate the Gonzales or Joel due to their low socio-economic condition, but despite everything Marisienka and Sebastián support the Cayetana and Joel's relationship.

Fernanda feels jealous of Joel and Cayetana's relationship and decides to go face Cayetana so that she leaves Joel alone, but in her outburst she falls casually into the pool. However, Francesca suffers a nervous breakdown and is admitted to a nursing home, during her crisis she imagines seeing Mariano Pen-Davis. Grace argues with Cayetana, and she suffers a nervous breakdown and is admitted to the same nursing home where Francesca is located, however she suddenly disappears,

While Miguel Ignacio and Isabella resume their relationship. Isabella reconciles with Miguel Ignacio and has made him return to the house, but they all did not think that was very good. While Lucho becomes the right hand of Miguel Ignacio, which is why Reina is happier with her husband.

On the other hand, Charito finds out that Viviana and Raúl are getting married, causing her to become jealous. Grace returns to see how Nicolás was but he is now with Rubí. Desperate Raúl sings a song to Viviana and she ends up throwing water at him. Raúl, being sad about Viviana's departure, talks to Charo, she advises him and Raúl thanks her, Miguel Ignacio reconciles with Gladys taking advantage of the fact that Viviana is not there but Gladys did not remember to cook so Charito brings food to Raúl.

Rubí appears, the "Unnameable", the one who in the past broke Manolo López's heart makes her appearance. Manolo invites Tere to a pub to share a moment alone and listen to music, without imagining that Rubí would be in that place as a singer, which began to cause Manolo disturbances. Rubí and Teresa become friends causing terror to Manolo who kisses Rubí again feeling something for her ending with Teresa. When Teresa discovers the truth, she goes to Socorro to explain to her about the unnamable. Upon leaving, Grace and Nelly Francesca, to Huamanga, Nicolás meets Rubí, then they fall in love and end up as boyfriends. Grace, upon returning from Huamanga, discovers them, for which Nicolás asks Grace for a divorce and she does not accept. After a while, the two finally divorce.

On the other hand, it is revealed that Miguel Ignacio has hired the dancers for Joel's bachelor party 2 years ago. Upon learning about it and remembering the event, his daughter Fernanda ends up despising him and returns to Joel. After being jealous of him with Cayetana, his "little girl", Fernanda separates from Joel, then he decides to grow up and goes to Ayacucho. Fernanda seeks to be independent on her own. Days later, she and Cayetana travel to Huamanga on her own account and look for Joel but he chooses Fernanda, they return to Lima and re-plan their marriage while Cayetana vows revenge on both of them.

Charo opens a restaurant with the help of Francesca and Dr. Cross, becoming well known and popular. A very famous chef appears in the restaurant, however because they had not asked permission from the famous chefs of Peru, the restaurant is closed by the municipality of Las Lomas.

Darío appears, who is a great admirer of Susú, when he saw her act in Nubeluz as a child. Later they start a relationship despite their age difference, which brings problems to Susú who is expelled from the Maldini house by Bruno. Socorro decides to finally break up with Peter, leaving him completely devastated. Luciana meets Darío, and they start dating as friends without knowing that he is her mother's boyfriend. However, it is discovered that Darío and Mateo were twin brothers. Luciana decides to return to Madrid. Nicolás ends up with Rubí when he realizes that he only wanted him for his money. He then he begins to meet with Grace so it seems they would resume their relationship. Rubí, feeling devastated and deceived, she will one day seek revenge on the Gonzales and Nicolás.

Francesca to release her guilt for having defamed Carlos Cabrera and organizes a "Caravan of Kindness 2" together with all of the Gonzales. But hours later, Carlos discovers that Francesca defamed him internationally, thanks to some documents that Morgana gave him. After this, Carlos leaves Las Lomas and leaves Francesca forever. Cayetana sends Fernanda muddy on her wedding day to prevent her from marrying Joel with the intention of doing it herself. However, thanks to Teresa, Fernanda manages to overcome the terrible moment and manages to marry him. Meanwhile, Cayetana, also dressed as a bride, is transferred by her mother to a psychiatric clinic. Miguel Ignacio and Rubí are in a bar and she would take the opportunity to start a relationship with him out of ambition. Raúl and Viviana celebrate the arrival of their son after discovering that she is pregnant. And finally, Grace and Nicolás suffer a fatal car accident while traveling to Paracas. Right after, Charo receives a surprise call.

=== Season 7 ===
It is revealed that a drunk driver was responsible for Grace and Nicolás' accident. Grace's "death" causes great regret between the two families. Only Nicolás managed to survive the accident, while the "mysterious redhead" (Ariana) appears in the distance praying to a relative. Now Miguel Ignacio and Rubí are a couple, and Peter and Francesca had a close relationship, which makes them both uncomfortable. The series goes on an eight month timeskip, with everyone dealing with their own lifes. Nicolás points out that he will move forward with her daughter. He then meets Ariana, a professional psychologist, and starts a relationship together.

The Maldinis begin to return from "Fort Lauderdale" starting with Francesca, although she does so only to fire Peter over a misunderstanding. Pepe briefly loses his sanity for having lost Tito, who left for Amsterdam. Then, Koky Reyes (Paul Vega) appears and, to stay at the house, he makes arrangements, for Charo's bad streak, who hates him for the indecent compliments he made when he met. However, Tito would return shortly. Nowadays Joel has his company "Taxi Churro" and Manolo is a teacher.

The series focus again of Claudia's revenge after being released from prison. Among the macabre plans being carrying out this season are: The kidnapping of Violeta and Milagros; Rubí's frustrated wedding; Miguel Ignacio's boarding school in an asylum; the manipulation and attempted assassination of Manolo; and the linking of "Constructora De Las Casas" under the hands of Ángel Gaviria's mafia with the objective of devastating Angel's mafia by the PNP (Peruvian National Police), in a domino effect of taking down the entire Maldini family they will live out their lives in absolute misery in prison for drug trafficking crimes. By doing so, Claudia's revenge would come to an end. Throughout the season, Sergio Estrada (Isabella's former psychiatric doctor) and Rubí will be Claudia's accomplices in carrying out her revenge.

Milagros, a humble young woman who works selling sandwiches, comes to the life of the Gonzales and Nicolás. After the immense void that Grace left when she presumably died, Milagros wins the affection of the Gonzales and takes Grace's place in the heart of Charito, who sees her as her new daughter.

Since Miguel Ignacio and Raúl unmasked Sergio, ending his relationship with Charo, he decides not to be the "Good Sergio" anymore. In this phase, the thirst for revenge is shown to leave Francesca humiliated and defeated, for this, both will use all their cards, first manipulating Rubí, then M. Ignacio and then with Manolo. Meanwhile, Francesca expels M. Ignacio forever from the Constructora due to her intimacy with Claudia. She later learns the truth about Rubí and that she was blackmailed by Claudia. With all these changes, Francesca decides to put Nicolás as General Manager and Fernanda as Image Manager. Much to her regret, Milagros is now Fernanda's assistant and the two do not get along very well. Ariana rather, this reassures him.

The story has a 360° turn with the death of Violeta, who was run over by Emilia, Nicolás' upstart girlfriend. Francesca will be an to this crime to cover up Violeta's death so that Emilia marries Nicolás and succeed the Maldini legacy when Francesca passes away. This tragedy brought Nicolás and Milagros closer together. On the other hand. Ángel Gaviria and Miguel Ignacio will have a rivalry for Rubí's love. Shortly after, Milagros would kiss Nicolás, who would not reciprocate her feelings. Rubí, through Ángel, informs Milagros of the witness of her mother's death: Jacinto Tinoco, Gilberto's fellow countryman, a trickster beggar and swindler. Francesca buys his silence by pretending to be crazy.

Meanwhile, after failing in love, Isabella looks for Pepe, her love since childhood, and after a while she lets go and decides to accept her origins in Abanquino and forgive her parents. Therefore, Isabella and Pepe went to Abancay, to visit them. It was then that Chabela, Isabella's real mother had died, before Isabella and Pepe arrived. Isabella wanted to fix things with her mother, apologizing for not coming earlier, finally calling Chabela "Mom", just like Chabela has always wanted her to say her since she was little. She befriends her father, Emiliano hers, to whom she tells that she will visit him often or he can come to "Las Lomas" whenever he wants.

By neglecting some Chinese investors, Nicolás puts the company in "red". At that moment Luchito resigns to go with M. Ignacio and this fact is used to mislead Francesca. Ángel Gavidia appears to be the new investor and save the prestige of the Construction Company. More changes happen in the company. Joel becomes Fernanda's new secretary (which is convenient for Nicolás to remain as Francesca's favorite) and on the other hand, Miguel Ignacio and Raúl founded their own company.

Both Nicolás and Ariana are unsure of what they feel. At the doors of their wedding, both have a meeting with Emilia and Manolo respectively: When Manolo writes about how she feels about Ariana, she begins to fall in love with him by reading her writings. In that, they kiss. On the other hand, Emilia has been plotting that Nicolás is attached to her, she is the ideal woman for what the Maldini are looking for from the young heir, and he makes a mistake and kisses her. After that, he regrets it. These infidelities would come out in a short time.

While Rubí is happy now with Ángel, in a meeting, they witness Nicolás's breakup with Ariana. Ariana reveals to Nicolás that she no longer feels anything for him. Manolo confronts Nicolás, Ariana appears in the Constructora but Emilia had already plotted everything and reveals everything. Ariana discovers the falsehood of Emilia, who knew everything and being like that, Ariana stays with Manolo and Emilia with Nicolás.

Claudia had set bomb planted at Constructora De Las Casas, with Sergio believing that it was set on Nelly Francesca baptism. The bomb exploded and completely devastated the company, leading the Maldini to bankruptcy. In an act of revenge, Francesca shoots Claudia twice, but Claudia confesses a secret to her before dying. Miguel Ignacio is rescued from the asylum by Raúl and Betty, disguised as a doctor and a nurse, respectively.

After the investigation carried out by Manolo and handed over to the PNP, Ángel Gaviria's mafia is disbanded by the police and setting everyone under arrest. Nicolás, Emilia, Joel, Fernanda, Pepe, Tito, Rubí, Alejo and Gilberto were captured and sent to prison along with Ángel for being linked to the mafia. Only Koky avoids his arrest and asks Charo for forgiveness, leaving her alone and stunned. Raúl and Manolo decide to leave Las Lomas forever with Betty and Ariana, respectively. Patrick and Richard have a plane crash, with the mystery if they had died or survived. Milagros is saved from the explosion, in which she realizes that the case of her mother's death is closed and she goes to study in Buenos Aires, resigned to losing Nicolás but moving forward with her life.

The season finale's last scene shows a mysterious house very far from "Las Lomas", where a woman is revealed to be in a wheelchair looking forward from a balcony. It was later revealed that the woman's identity was, in fact, Grace, revealing that she never died at least.

=== Season 8 ===
Francesca receives a brief phone call from Grace, who contacted her at the request of Carmen, the woman who is posing as her mother. After discovering that Grace is still alive and tells Peter, they both go to Grace's 'tomb' in a cemetery. Francesca begins to have nightmares about Grace, telling her that she is alive, which Francesca decides to find out with Peter's help, but they accidentally break the headstone. Charo and Teresa find out that Grace's grave was desecrated, but unfortunately they couldn't find out who the culprits were. One day when women visit the prison, the criminals made a riot and seized the prison, but were arrested with the help of Sergio Estrada and the deputy director of the prison. The leader of the rioters, Atila, managed to escape with Charo as hostage, but Koky manages to stop him and was shot in the chest by Atila, and is transferred to a clinic. The Gonzales are set free from prison, conditionally. Ángel Gaviria managed to escaped disguised himself as a woman along with his assistants. Meanwhile, Koky is in danger of dying, but he managed to survive. Reina goes out to the street with his mother and the Gonzales took the opportunity to take back the first floor.

Meanwhile, in a house very far from "Las Lomas", where Grace is, a fire breaks out, so she tries to escape, but it was not easy. It is there that she meets Marco Sandoval, an agronomist and cherimoya farmer, who saves her from the fire that has occurred. It is there that they fall in love with her at first sight of her, and Marco begins to hang out with her, bringing her cherimoyas. It is there, where Francesca gives Carmen a large amount of money to free her from her.

The construction company is rebuilt and renamed as "Corporación Maldini" as a major conglomerate of all of Francesca Maldini's companies, with the help of Miguel Ignacio. Fernanda and Nicolás become independent from their family and entrepreneured their company "Corporación Fernico", with Ángel Gaviria's help after their innocence was "proven", but later ended up being a subsidiary of Corporación Maldini.

One of the milestones that marked this season was the reappearance of Grace Gonzales in the middle of Emilia and Nicolás's wedding. Carmen set Francesca Maldini as the main responsible for the kidnapping, as she wanted Emilia to be her successor and was even arrested for this. However, Grace's friend Belen tells the truth to the Gonzales family that Grace was not kidnapped by Francesca but by Claudia, removing the complaint from her. When it was already thought that Grace and Nicolás would get back together as a couple and parents of Nelly Francesca, the two decided to continue with their own path, Grace with Marco and Nicolás with Emilia, which generated altercations between the two about how they were going to raise Nelly Francesca to the end of the season.

This also marks the second divorce between Joel and Fernanda, due to the fact that Emilia's brother, Camilo, fell in love with Fernanda and she also fell in love with him, because it is difficult to live with her husband Joel because they are of a different class, in addition to rumors of flirting with Miss Elizabeth. Camilo and Fernanda were together until it was discovered that the first cheated to his ex-girlfriend Almudena. Camilo then embezzled and broke Fernico and was later arrested but then escaped and was returned by Ángel (possibility killing him). But it was too late because Joel fell in love with Grace's therapist, Pilar García, which in the end turned into a love triangle because Joel still hasn't forgotten Fernanda, and even before she left for Panama where they had sex in a hotel. Fernanda then returns to Lima, realizing she was pregnant with Joel, which causes that he breaks up with Pilar and returned with Fernanda.

Grace soon discovers that Marco is cheating on her with Ivana, which is not true. Then they both end, and Grace will find a way to win back Nicolás, but then in reality, it is discovered that Marco was telling the truth about Ivana, so it seems they would resume their relationship. Ivana, spending so many moments with Marco, discovers that she is in love with him, much to Marco's chagrin, and tries to stop Grace and Marco from getting married. So she starts, apparently, a relationship with Tito. Marco, knowing that he cannot stand Ivana, decides to unmask her, and with the help of Tito, Pepe and Grace, they succeed. Tito discovers the whole truth, and ends up with Ivana forever, who, feeling cheated, leaves Las Lomas, vowing to return to win back Marco. But it was too late because Grace confessed to Marco that she kissed with Nicolás, so they both end forever, canceling their marriage, and Marco returns to her home, although he will also help Grace only when she needs it.

Meanwhile, Lucho and Reina get married in a dream marriage but everything is frustrated when Miguel Ignacio appears along with the police accusing Lucho of having systematically stolen a large amount of money. Faced with the situation, Lucho confesses his crime and is taken to prison but is later released. Lucho after being fired from the Maldini Corporation, he travels to Yunguyo to refresh his conscience, but on the way he again suffers a car accident and it is presumed that he died a second time, but the truth is that once again he fled not to face the fact to have a third family with Dora Hilasaca. Lucho meets some of his relatives who reject him, then he returns home to try to fix things. Tired of his lies, the Gonzales kick him out of the house once more for good decreeing that Lucho is totally dead and buried for them. When the options run out, he decides to accept defeat, and leaves with Dora and Luchito from "Las Lomas".

Nicolás discovers that Grace and Nelly Francesca had escaped, with the aim that the latter does not separate her from Grace forever. It is revealed that the two of them actually went to where Marco lives, who receives them lodging. Shortly after, Nicolas finds out where Grace and Nelly Francesca really went and decides to look for them. Once found, Grace finally reluctantly agrees to return. Upon returning home, while arguing about what was really happening for the property of Nelly Francesca, due to a carelessness of her daughter to unbuckle her belt, Nicolás turns and they suffer a traffic accident where Nelly Francesca was the most affected. She was admitted to the clinic in a comatose state, but thanks to union and the prayers of the two families, Nelly Francesca was able to wake up. However, the doctor pointed out that they should operate on her due to her delicate state. By majority, it was decided operate her in USA, so Grace needed the humanitarian Visa to travel. Francesca moved her influence so that Grace can not obtain the passport succeeded thanks to Emilia. Grace, ultimately, could not travel with Nicolás to see the progress of the operation.

- Nelly Francesca is saved from the accident, and was discharged, uniting the two families right after.
- Rafaella returns to "Las Lomas" and resumes her relationship with Pepe.
- Lucho starts a relationship with Dora and decides to forget about Reina Pachas.
- Carmen, devastated by the death of her daughter Claudia, decides to take revenge on Francesca and shoots Isabella to the belly in a theater, killing her. Francesca and Leonardo are devastated by her death. Later, Carmen and Leonardo are arrested, and sentenced to prison.
- Milagros and Jacinto Tinoco reunited the evidence that proofs that Emilia was responsible for her mother's death a year ago. She is then arrested by the police and sentenced to prison.
- Nicolás, after learning the truth about Emilia, is consoled by Grace, and both reconcile, resuming their relationship definitively.
- A romantic encounter would reveal that Marco found love in Pilar.
- Miguel Ignacio, upon learning that the Gonzales mortgaged their house to help Grace, and lost it, after a false paperwork done by Mabel Wilson, took advantage of the opportunity and bought it. Then with the help of some thugs, they evicted all of the Gonzales from her house to destroy it. As a result, half of the Gonzales find themselves in the worst of miseries, moving to live in a prefabricated cabin at the foot of a hill, in which they meet again with Susú who is now engaged in social work.
- Gladys leaves for her town with Otto, leaving Miguel Ignacio forever after seeing that he will never change his ambitions and always think about money, the demolition of the Gonzales house and everything that happened. Miguel Ignacio is left definitely alone.
- Mike is disinherited by his mother, Anita Miller, who reappears to break the news and reveal her opposition to his relationship with Monserrat.
- Francesca, together with her butler Peter, sells the Maldini house and goes to live in a new modern mansion in the district of "La Molina" to forget Isabella's death and all the crimes that committed in the past. Feeling lonely, she invites the Gonzales and all the other residents of Las Lomas to live in her new, immense and luxurious mansion, finally ending the difference between the two families.
- Fernanda and Joel give birth to their two twins: Nemo and Doris.
- Both families (The Gonzales and The Maldinis) finally managed to overcome their differences between them and form a family united forever.

== Cast ==
The Gonzales Household

- Gustavo Bueno as Gilberto Collazos Chipana (Nelly's second husband)
- Irma Maury as Nelly Camacho Morote de Collazos (Gilberto's wife)
- David Almandoz as José Visitación "Pepe" Gonzales Camacho (Nelly's son from a first marriage)
- Magdyel Ugaz as Teresa Olibama "Tere" Collazos Camacho or "Teresita" (Gilberto and Nelly's daughter)
- Mónica Sánchez as Maria del Rosario "Charo" Flores Rojas De Gonzales (Gilberto and Nelly's daughter-in-law)
- Erick Elera as Joel Luis Gonzales Flores (Lucho and Charo's first son)
- Mayra Couto as Graciela del Rosario "Grace" Gonzales Flores (Lucho and Charo's daughter)
- Bruno Odar as Luis Juan "Lucho" Gonzales Camacho (Nelly's second son, from a first marriage Charo's first husband)
- Tatiana Astengo as Reyna Emperatriz Pachas Montero (Lucho's second wife)
- László Kovács as Alberto "Tito" Lara Smith (Pepe's best friend and roommate)
- Joaquin Escobar as Juan Gabriel "Johnny" Gonzales Pachas (Lucho and Reyna's son)
- Areliz Benel as Shirley Anyer Gonzales Pachas (Lucho and Reyna's daughter)
- Aarón Picasso (S1 to S5), Andrés Mesías (S6 to S8) and Jorge Guerra (S9-present) as Jaime Juan "Jaimito/Jimmy" Gonzales Flores (Lucho and Charo's third and last son)

The Maldini Household

- Yvonne Frayssinet as Francesca Vittoria Maldini Di Paolo (matriarch of the Maldini family, Isabella's adoptive mother)
- Karina Calmet as Isabella Fernanda Picasso Maldini / Isabel Pampañaupa Sulca (Francesca and Bruno's adoptive daughter / Emiliano and Chabela's real daughter)
- Sergio Galliani as Miguel Ignacio de las Casas Diez Canseco / "Nachito" (Isabella's first husband)
- Bárbara Cayo as Rafaella Mariana Picasso Maldini (Francesca and Bruno's daughter and Pepe's girlfriend)
- Andrés Wiese as Nicolás Ignacio "Ricolas" de las Casas Picasso (Isabella and Miguel Ignacio's first son)
- Nataniel Sánchez as Fernanda Mariana "Chuckycita" de las Casas Picasso (Isabella and Miguel Ignacio's first daughter)
- Adolfo Chuiman as Rodolfo Rojas Neyra a.k.a. "Peter McKay" (Francesca's butler)
- Melanie Urbina as Maria de Monserrat Chafloque Neciosup (Francesca's maid)
- Luis Ángel Pinasco as Bruno Angelo Picasso Bertini (Isabella and Rafaella's father, Francesca's first husband)
- Marco Zunino as Leonardo "Cosito" Llanos Torres a.k.a. Leonardo Rizo-Patrón (Isabella's husband and Claudia's brother)
- Marcelo Oxenford as Mariano Pendavis - (Actor Marcelo Oxenford is Yvonne Fraysinnet's husband in real life)

Other characters

- Daniela Sarfaty as Susan "Susú" Ferrand (Isabella's best friend)
- Valeria Bringas as Luciana Sigrid del Prado Ferrand (Susú and Raúl's daughter)
- Pierina Carcelén as Liliana Morales (Miguel Ignacio's ex-secretary/lover, Tito's ex-fiancée)
- Fernando Bakovic as Padre Manuel (Priest of Las Lomas)
- Junior Silva as Kevin Arturo Manrique o "Gabriel Calvo Pollo Gordo" (Joel's best friend)
- Paola Enrico as María Elena
- Chiara Molina as Mia Wong (Fernanda's old best friend)
- Andrea Barbier as Marilú
- Katia Salazar as Janet'
- Karla Medina as Verónica "Verito" Miranda
- Oscar Ugaz as Roberto Cercado "Robert"
- Christian Thorsen as Raúl del Prado / Platanazo (Susú's ex-husband, Charo's second husband)
- Amparo Brambilla as Vanessa Camacho Morote (Nelly's sister)
- Úrsula Boza as Claudia Fernanda Llanos Torres / Claudia Zapata a.k.a. "La Mirada De Tiburón" (Miguel Ignacio's ex-secretary/lover and most important villain)
- Akinori Sato as Felipe Toshiro Ikeda
- Sergio Gjurinovic as Mateo Wiese (Fernanda's ex-boyfriend)
- Stephanie Jacobs as Chiara Benavides
- Daniela Camaiora as Margarita "Nataniel" Arizmende
- Marisol Ramos as Brenda Ramos
- Carlos Cabrera as Pancho
- Hector Jiménez as El Chamán
- Paco Bazan as Richard Felix Wilkinson (Ex-boyfriend of Teresa and father of Richard Jr.)
- Julián Legaspi as Ángel Gaviria Moncada / Ángel Picasso Moncada (Leader of the "Familia" mafia, and Shirley, Rubí and Teresa's ex-boyfriend)
- Marcial Mattews as Jacinto Tinoco
- Manuel Escalante as Carlos de la Cadena
- Haydeé Cáceres as Bertha Domínguez (Gilberto's Girlfriend)
- Alessandra Denegri as Cayetana Bogani (Ex-girlfriend of Nicolas and Joel)
- Mariano Sabato as Tony Beteta
- Carlos Solano as Felix Panduro (Las Lomas' watchman)
- Joaquín de Orbegoso as Michael "Mike" Miller Villavicencio (Monserrat's boyfriend, Fernanda and Andrea's ex-boyfriend)
- Kukulí Morante as Gladys (Miguel Ignacio's ex-girlfriend, Mother of Otto, Miguel Ignacio's child)
- Cynthia Chanta as Fabiola
- Anita Martínez as María Eugenia Pflücker de Del Prado
- Diego Seminario as Gianfranco "Gianguapo" Bogani (Cayetana's brother and Grace's boyfriend)
- Natalia Salas as Andrea Aguirre (Mike and Joel's ex-girlfriend)
- Olga Zumaran as Yolanda Arriola
- Tatiana Alfaro as Julieta
- Denisse Dibós as Ana Lucia Villavicencio Graña de Miller / De las Casas "Anita Miller"
- María Fe Fuentes Valega as Mabel Wilson
- Jhoany Vegas as Martha
- Cesar Ritter as Manolo López (Socorro and Peter's first and only child)
- Anahí de Cárdenas as Rubí San Román / Rufina Sánchez Huamán (Milagros’ sister, and Nicolás and Miguel Ignacio's ex-girlfriend)
- Paul Vega as Jorge "Koky" Reyes (Charo's husband)
- Paloma Fevi (Feví) as Salti
- Carolina Cano as Emilia de La Borda Orbegoso (Nicolas' ex-wife)
- Jose Dammert as Camilo de La Borda Orbegoso (Fernanda's ex-boyfriend and Emilia's brother)
- Vania Accinelli as Pilar García (Joel's ex-girlfriend and Grace's therapist)
- Javier Dulzaides as Marco Sandoval (Grace's ex-boyfriend)
- Teddy Guzman as Carmen Torres Vda. de Llanos / "Rosa Pérez" a.k.a. "La mamá de La Mirada De Tiburón" (Widow of Fernando Llanos and mother of Claudia and Leonardo Llanos - main villain of the 8th season)
- Francisca Aronsson as Daniela Reyes
- Cindy Diaz as Milagros Sanchez Huamán (Rubí’s sister)
- Tula Rodriguez as Dora Hilasaca (Lucho's third wife)
- Ian Ameri Vera as Richard Felix Wilkinson Collazos (Richard and Teresa's son)

== Product promotions ==
- In September 2010, Embotelladora Don Jorge S.A.C. of Lima Peru announced its promotion of Al Fondo Hay Sitio on labels of Perú Cola and Isaac Kola. The labels of Perú Cola featured caricatures of 14 different characters from the telenovela on the front of the 500 ml and 1.5 litre PET bottles. The larger sizes (2.200 litres and 3.300 litres) had groups of characters on the larger size labels. With five flavors of Peru Cola (including Isaac Kola) and 14 characters, there were 70 different labels available to collect. In addition to the labels, there were prizes consisting of 50 different collectible stickers featuring 16 different characters from the show (with similar caricatures used on the face of the labels) available on the inside of the peel-off labels — one each on the 500 ml and 1.5 litre bottles. The 2.200 litre bottles came with two stickers, and the 3.300 litre bottles had three stickers. The promotion officially ended November 15, 2010, but the labels and stickers were available on store shelves after that time. The television commercial for the promotion publicized an interactive website for the promotion.
- In November 2010, Corporación José R. Lindley S.A. of Lima Peru announced its premium promotion of Frugos Kards picturing scenes from Al Fondo Hay Sitio. Customers were instructed to redeem one cap from the 1 litre size carton of Frugos nectar, or three tabs with the Tetra Pak logo from the 235 ml juice boxes, plus 50 centimos (PEN) in exchange for two packs of Frugos Kards at participating retailers across Peru. There were 80 different collectible photo cards, and 40 different cardstock diecut standups. Contest cards were included in packs to win visits by television series characters to the consumer's home, dinner with actors from the series, visits to the set of the show, tickets to live shows, and caps and T-shirts. The offer was available nationwide in Peru and authorized until December 30, 2010 or while supplies lasted. The television commercial for the promotion featured Teresita played by actress Magdyel Ugaz (and included other characters from the show).
- In January 2011, Embotelladora Don Jorge S.A.C. introduced a second promotion for Al Fondo Hay Sitio. It featured a second set of sticker-tattoos (decals, unlike the larger format square stickers from the first series) with new artwork with various caricatures of characters from the television series on 1/2 liter PET bottles of Perú Cola and Isaac Kola. This promotion did not include different collectable labels with different characters as in the first promotion. The label indicated that an album for the stickers could be ordered from a website for the promotion.
