= Mónica Sánchez =

Peruvian actress

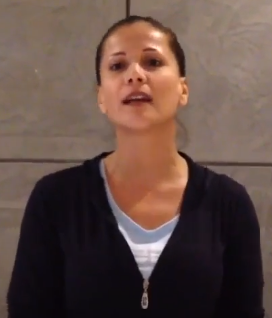
Mónica Mariel Sánchez Cuadros

Mónica Mariel Sánchez Cuadros (born February 27, 1970) is a Peruvian actress. She was born in Lima.

== Filmography ==
=== Movies ===
- La carnada (1999)
- Captain Pantoja and the Special Services (1999)
- Imposible Amor (2000)
- Pasajeros (2008)
- To Die For (2025) as Laura

=== Telenovelas y miniseries ===
- La Perricholi
- Bolero (1993)
- Las Mujeres de mi Vida (1993)
- Los de Arriba y los de Abajo (1994)
- Los unos y Los otros (1995)
- Nino (1996)
- Todo se compra, Todo se vende (1997)
- María Emilia: Querida (1999)
- Sarita Colonia (2002)
- Eva del Edén (2004)
- Sally, la muñequita del pueblo (2007-2008)
- Al Fondo Hay Sitio (2009)
- De vuelta al barrio (2017)
- Eres mi bien (2025-2026)

== Theater ==
- Sueño de una tarde dominical (2000)
- Macbeth (2000)
- Misericordia" (2008)
