= Marco Zunino =

Peruvian actor

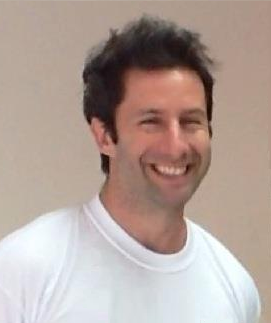
- Zunino in December 2011
- Born: Marco Aurelio Zunino Costa; 12 November 1976 (age 49); Ponce, Puerto Rico
- Education: Circle in the Square Theatre School
- Occupations: Actor; singer; songwriter
- Years active: 1991–present

Marco Aurelio Zunino Costa (born 12 November 1976) is a Peruvian actor, singer, songwriter and dancer. In his country has starred in the musicals Jesucristo Superstar, Cabaret, Rent and Amor sin barreras (West Side Story). Zunino debuted on Broadway, starring as Billy Flynn in Chicago, in the Ambassador Theatre (New York).

== Early life ==
Zunino was born on 12 November 1976 in Ponce, Puerto Rico. His parents had migrated to Puerto Rico from Peru due to the agrarian reform. They returned to Peru when he was eight months old. Zunino Costa is of Peruvian ancestry. He studied at Colegio Italiano Antonio Raimondi de La Molina.

Costa is a graduate of the Circle in the Square Theatre School.

== Theatre ==
List of credits in theatre as an actor
Year	Title	Role	Notes
1991	Rock, pelagatos y la otra piel	—N/a	
1997	A Chorus Line	Al	
1998	La manzana prohibida	Juan Carlos	
1999	Into the Woods	Mysterious man	Circle in the Square Theatre School
2000	Romeo y Julieta	Romeo Montesco	Lead role
2002	El musical	Various roles	
2004	La novicia rebelde	Rolf	
2005	La corporación	Roger	
2005	Mis favoritas de Broadway	Performer	Recital
2006	Jesucristo Superstar	Jesús	Lead role
2007	El jardín secreto	Dickon	
2008	Don Quijote de la Mancha, el musical	Sansón Carrasco	
2008	Il Duce	El rey	
2008	Arsénico y encaje antiguo	Mortimer Brewster	9 October – 14 December
2009	Cabaret	Emcee	13 May – 21 June; 1 – 31 October
2010	El musical 2010	Various roles	12 May – 27 June
2010	¡Grántico, pálmani, zum!	Golmodi	Children's show
2010	Rent	Roger Davis	Lead role
2011	Amor sin barreras (West Side Story)	Tony Wycek	Lead role 2 June – 10 July
2012	Chicago	Billy Flynn	Ambassador Theatre, New York City; 16 January – 4 March
2012	Chicago	Billy Flynn	Teatro Municipal de Lima; 7 June – 22 July
2012	Chicago	Billy Flynn	Teatro Marsano
2013	The Boy from Oz	Peter Allen	Lead role

== Filmography ==
List of television credits as an actor
Year	Title	Role	Notes
1995	Canela	Bruno	
1996	Cuchillo y Malú		
1997	Torbellino	Marco	
1997	Leonela, muriendo de amor	Willy	
1998	Cosas del amor	Pablo	
1998	Andrea, tiempo de amar	Renzo	Lead role
1999	Isabella, mujer enamorada		
2003	Alias	Hotel manager	Episode: "A Missing Link"
2005	Nunca te diré adiós		
2005	Viento y arena	Giovanni	
2005–2006	Decisiones	Various roles	Episode "Una vida prestada" Episode "Ciega pasión" Episode "Detrás de la apariencia" Episode "Juegos del destino" Episode "La mejor de las venganzas" Episode "Mi esposa por tu mamá" Episode "Pasión a escondidas" Episode "Un amor imposible" Episode "Un largo verano" Episode "Un precio demasiado alto"
2006	Esta sociedad	Daniel Rodríguez-Ugarteche	
2007	Golpe a golpe	Piero	Antagonist
2008	Esta sociedad 2	Daniel Rodríguez-Ugarteche	
2008–2009	Los Barriga	Carlos Alberto Irazábal	Antagonist
2009	Clave uno: médicos en alerta	Patient	Guest star
2010–2013, 2016	Al Fondo Hay Sitio	Leonardo Rizo-Patrón	Recurring role
2020–present	Control Z	Damian Williams	Recurring role

List of television credits as himself
Year	Title	Role	Notes
1993–1995	Nubeluz	Golmodi	
2008	Bailando por un sueño	Contestant	Second season. Winner.
2008	Bailando por un sueño: reyes de la pista	Contestant	4° place
2009	El show de los sueños: amigos del alma	Contestant	5° place
2010	El Gran Show	Guest judge	31 July; 7 August

List of film credits as an actor
Year	Title	Role	Notes
2007	La Gran Sangre: la película	Rocha's henchman	
2008	Ojos de fuego		
2008	Valentino y el clan del can	Bones/Anthony	Voice
2008	Mañana te cuento 2		
2011	Bolero de noche		
2020	The Best Families	Mariano	
2023	Little Red Riding Wolf	Pedro	
2024	Mistura	Kiko Ledgard	
2025	Astronauta		

== Discography ==
Year	Song	Album	Notes
2009	"Ser diferente"	N/A	Feat. José Val.
2009	"¡Despierta, es navidad!"	La Navidad de tus sueños	Feat. El show de los sueños artists.
2010	"Para siempre"	N/A	Al Fondo Hay Sitio

== Awards and nominations ==
Year	Title	Award	Nominated work	Result
2012	Broadway.com Audience Choice Awards	Favorite Replacement	Chicago	Pre-nominated
