= El Show de los sueños =

- Created by: Televisa
- Presented by: Gisela Valcárcel
- Country of origin: Peru
- Original language: Spanish
- No. of seasons: 2
- No. of episodes: 12

Production
- Running time: 3 hours (Live)
- Production company: GV Producciones

Original release
- Network: América Televisión
- Release: May 23, 2009

The Peruvian version of El show de los sueños (The show of dreams), whose creation is due to Rubén Galindo Jr. and Santiago Galindo, premiered in 2009, hosted by Gisela Valcárcel. The programs, which according to the format are called "galas" will be transmitted on Saturdays at 10 pm (UTC-5) on América Televisión live from the studios.

== Concept and schedule ==
El Show de los sueños (Peru) is the joint adaptation of the formats "Dancing for a Dream" and "Singing for a Dream". The reality show is a contest between teams, each consisting of 2 and 1 famous dreamers who compete in the contest of song and dance set to earn $1 million for a special cause chosen by each team. According to the original format (originally issued in Mexico) it occurs in two seasons, "Blood of my Blood" and "Friends of the Soul". In the first teams are made up of members of one family and in the second season, dreamers are part of a group of friends, all eager to find a common dream. Finally, after these two seasons the third called "Kings of the Show", in which only the finalists of the first and the second season compete. Week, the teams demonstrated their skills in the 2 disciplines and are judged by juries 8 (4 of 4 dancing and singing). The final result of the two disciplines are combined, and 2 couples with the lowest score are 'ruling' and then spends a couple to be eliminated.

== First Season ==
The first season of "El show de los sueños" was launched on Saturday, May 23, 2009. The show has an average of 48 rating points.

=== Judges ===
The program has two judges group of three members each. One jury will evaluate the performance in singing and the other, performances of dance. The scores awarded by the jury are final.

==== Singing Judges ====
- Cecilia Bracamonte (Singer)
- Fabrizio Aguilar (Film director)
- Andrés Arriaza (Singing teacher)

==== Dance Judges ====
- Morella Petrozzi (professional dancer)
- Carlos Alcántara (Actor and the winner of the first season of Bailando por un sueño (Perú))
- Pachi Valle Riestra (professional dancer)

Famous	Occupation	Dreamer	Nacionality	Number of judgments	Place	Rhythms of Elimination
Sandra Muente	Singer	Los Herrera Soto	Peru Mexico	2	Winner	
Rossana Fernández-Maldonado	Actress	Los Martínez	Peru	3	Second Place	
Christian Ysla	Actor	Los Villanueva	Peru	3	Third Place	Own Rhythm and mix
Ebelin Ortiz	Actress, Singer	Los Carbajal	Peru	1	Eliminated in 11th. Gala	Merengue y Championship salsa
Percy Olivares	Former soccer player	Los Centeno	Peru	2	Eliminated in 10th. Gala	Peruvian Rock and Music of Perú
Giuliana Rengifo	Singer	Los Tejada	Peru	2	Eliminated in 9th. Gala	Merengue and hip hop
Damaris	Songwriter	Los Vargas	Peru	1	Eliminated in 7th. Gala	Ranchera and Cumbia
Pablo Saldarriaga	Actor and singer	Los Herrera	Peru	1	Eliminated in 7th. Gala	Salsa and Pop music
Salvador Heresi	Mayor of San Miguel	Los Varda	Peru	5	Eliminated in 6th. Gala	Vallenato and Axé
Jorge Pardo	Songwriter	Los Manchego	Peru	1	Eliminated in 5th. Gala	Rock en Español and Disco
Claudia Berninzon	Actress	Los Chávez	Peru	1	Eliminated in 4th. Gala	Ballad and Merengue (dance)
Lucho Cuéllar	Singer	Las Alburqueque	Peru	1	Eliminated in 3rd. Gala	Pop Latino and Reggaeton
Diego Dibós	Singer	Las Moina	Peru	1	Eliminated in 2nd. Gala	Cumbia and Salsa music
