= Diego Seminario =

Peruvian actor and industrial designer (born 1989)

Diego Seminario De Col (born May 13, 1989) is a Peruvian actor and industrial designer. He is most known for his role of Gianfranco Bogani in the hit Peruvian television show Al fondo hay sitio. He graduated from the Pontifical Catholic University of Peru.

== Television ==
- Esta sociedad as El Chato
- Al fondo hay sitio as Gianfranco "Gianguapo" Bogani
