= Bailando por un Sueño (Peruvian TV series) =

- Created by: Televisa
- Starring: Gisela Valcárcel
- Country of origin: Peru
- No. of episodes: 7 (second season)

Original release
- Network: Panamericana Television
- Release: 2008 – 2009

The Peruvian version of Bailando por un Sueño premiered its first season on June 7, 2008, hosted by Gisela Valcárcel, who returned to Peruvian television after spending three years away. The programs, in a format called "galas", transmitted on Saturdays at 10 pm (-5 GMT) for Panamericana Television live from the Monitor Studios, located in the Lima district of San Borja.

== Concept and schedule ==
Bailando por un Sueño is a reality show where 13 participants called "The Dreamers" star in a dance competition in which the winner will realize a dream that becomes public knowledge, either to resolve a personal problem or to help someone else. The program focuses on social assistance that can be provided to talented people who have no economic means to achieve certain goals.

The "dreamers" are not alone in his company, each of which receives the aid or support of a famous person or "hero", who make up a pair of dancers. The "dreamers" are 13 ordinary people who were chosen after passing a rigorous audition, and are a common feature, special talent for dance, and have dramatic stories of personal need or altruistic goals for their community. On the other hand, the famous "heroes" are celebrities from the entertainment and sports world, most of whom had no prior preparation for the dance event and were offered voluntarily or were summoned by Gisela Valcárcel to help each "dreamer" achieve the realization of his dream.

The thirteen couples (dreamer and hero) will compete over 12 weekly galas, which will eliminate those couples who, by the score awarded by the jury, are sentenced and receive the fewest votes from viewers' telephone calls. At the final gala will be competitions by two couples who have achieved the long-awaited fulfilment of their dream, as well as an award from a surprise Cerveza Cristal.

The four couples who succeed in reaching the top ranks of the First Season will participate in November 2008 in the "Kings of the Dancefloor" along with the three couples highlights of the second season (which began in late August), plus of that couple to occupy the best 4th place in the first two seasons as the score given by judges. The dreamer of the couple receiving the first of this tournament will win a prize of 100,000 soles, and next to the famous who will be accompanying him to represent Peru at the Second International Dance Championship, which will possibly take place in Argentina in 2009.

"Bailando por un Sueño" is part of prime time Saturday of Panamericana Television, is transmitted from 10:00 pm, lasting about two and a half hours, and includes the transmission of micro daily from Monday to Friday along the regular programming of this television channel, which began in the weeks before the gala premiere of the first and whose purpose is to keep the public abreast of the trials of participants as well as reporting on couples "sentenced" to the public can save by voting through telephone calls or text messages (In the first week of micro reported on the casting process that ended with the selection of the 13 "dreamers").

Gisela Valcárcel, formerly known as "The queen of Noon," is a risk in investing a huge amount of money so far not revealed to buy the license from "Dancing for a Dream," perhaps the most successful franchise of Televisa, which traveled to Mexico to personally contact its creators, Santiago and Ruben Galindo. Against all odds, his newly founded company GV Productions managed to acquire a license, besides having the right of first refusal to acquire an additional five programs from Televisa if the program succeeded in achieving success. Panamericana Television, the TV station that transmits the program, only provides its signal and some technical equipment through Panam Content, which is also responsible for conducting, but is not involved in any aspect of production and creative content, which is managed by SAC GV Productions, under the baton of the producer and Ricky Rodriguez Gisela the same.

== First season ==
The first season of "Bailando por un sueño" was launched on Saturday, June 7, 2008, with a prognosis reserved by the critics, even as it recalled the reasons that led to his driver, Gisela Valcárcel, to leave television three years before. But the show was a success since its first broadcast, leading to dethrone "Fares Laughter," a comical nature of sexist and vulgar that it had been the leader of tune on weekends for many years. Although this was only saying that it was a fad and that soon they would run the streak, "Dancing for a Dream" in his first season continued as the absolute leader of tune on weekends, except in two specific nights When transmitted from the playoffs for the world of 2010 between the selections of Peru and Colombia as a channel of competition showed a special tribute to Mexican comic Chespirito, who was then in Lima presenting its drama "11 and 12 "with overwhelming success.

=== Jury ===
1. Joaquin Vargas (Theatre director, Television producer, and director of the new virtual version of Nubeluz)
2. Teddy Guzmán (theater Actress and television)
3. Carlos Cacho (Make-up artist for television and Host)
4. Pachi Valle Riestra (professional dancer)

=== Famous and Dreamers ===
Celebrity	Occupation	Dreamer	Nacionality	Number of sentences	Status	Elimination rhythm^{*1}
Carlos Alcántara	Actor	Carolina Guerra	peruano	0	Winners	
Adriana Zubiate	Model, Miss Perú, TV Host	Alan Ascuña	peruana	3	Runner Up	
Karina Calmet	Actress, Miss Perú, TV Host	Cronwel Manrique	peruana	2	Third Place	Quebradita^{*3}
Sergio Galliani	Actor	Leidy Marchinares	peruano	1	Eliminated on the 11th Gala	Rock^{*3}
Marisol Aguirre	Actress	Jesus Eyzaguirre	francesa peruana	3	Eliminated on the 10th Gala	New Weight^{*3}
Gabriel Calvo	Actor	Valeria Malásquez	peruano	2	Eliminated on the 9th Gala	Rock Peruano
Ebelin Ortiz	Actress	Jhon Kapp	peruana	1	Eliminated on the 8th Gala	Pachanga
Micky Rospigliosi †	Sports Reporter	Erica Goyzueta	peruano	3	Eliminated on the 7th Gala	Merengue
José Luis "El Puma" Carranza	Ex-Football player	Rocio Charún	peruano	3	Eliminated on the 6th Gala	Pop 80s
Tracy Freundt	Model / Host	Julio Salguero	peruana	1	Eliminated on the 5th Gala	Disco
Arnie Hussid^{*4}	Model / Businessman	Carmen Rosa Bobadilla	Israelí peruano	1	Eliminated on the 4th Gala	Reggaeton
Lucy Bacigalupo	Actress	Rodolfo Lozada ^{*2}	peruana	1	Eliminated on the 3rd Gala	Salsa
Karla Casós	Model / Singer	David Caicedo	peruana	1	Eliminated on the 2nd Gala	Cumbia

== Second season ==
The Second Season of Dancing for a Dream was launched on August 30 and culminate on November 15, 2008. In the opinion of critics and the public, couples this season have a competitive level higher than in the previous season and it is not clear who may be the favorites.

=== Jury ===
1. Joaquin Vargas (Theatre director, Television producer and director of the new virtual version of Nubeluz)
2. Morella Petrozzi (professional dancer)
3. Carlos Cacho (Make-up artist for television and Host)
4. Pachi Valle Riestra (professional dancer)

=== Famous and Dreamers ===
Famous	Occupation	Dreamer
Mónica Sánchez	Actress	Alex Petricek
Montserrat Brugué	Actress	Darren Morán
Marco Antonio	Stylist	Eileen Cabrera
Celine Aguirre	Actress / Psychologist / Host	Nicholas Tineo
Delly Madrid	Model	José Luis Campos
Percy Olivares	Ex-Footballer	Cecilia Reyes
Marco Zunino	Actor	Jardena Ugaz
Norka Ramírez	Actress	Nahun Osorio
Gustavo Mayer	Actor	Viviana Guerrero
Bárbara Cayo	Actress / Singer	Henry Ladines
Javier Valdés	Actor	Erica Chasi
Pold Gastello	Actor	Mónica Astacio
María Angélica Vega	Actress	Henry Otoya
