= Eva del Edén =

Eva del Edén is a 2004 Peruvian telenovela, the story is set in Lima, Peru in 1540s during Spanish colonial regime. The show focuses on the life of Eva de Palomino, a mestizo, and her struggle for recover the land which was stolen from her.
