= Gisela Valcárcel =

Peruvian television hostess

- Born: Sonia Mercedes Gisela Valcárcel Álvarez; 26 January 1963 (age 63); Lima, Peru
- Other names: "La reina del medio día" (the queen of mid-day TV shows), "La señito"
- Occupations: hostess, actress, writer, businesswoman
- Years active: 21
- Spouse(s): soccer player Roberto Martínez- captain of "U" (universitario de deportes) soccer team (divorced), Architect Javier Carmona (divorced)
- Children: Ethel Pozo

Sonia Mercedes Gisela Valcárcel Álvarez (born 26 January 1963) is a Peruvian television hostess, actress, and businesswoman. She owns and manages the Amarige Beauty Salons & Spas in Lima. She is the director of women's magazines Gisela and Amarige. She also runs her own television production company called GV Productions (El Show de los sueños (Peru), América Hoy, El Gran Show).

== Early life ==
Valcárcel was born on 26 January 1963. She is the daughter of Jorge Valcárcel and Teresa Álvarez. She studied at Institución Educativa Teresa González de Fanning.

Valcárcel was a minor when she became pregnant with her boyfriend Jorge Pozo. Once her daughter Ethel was born, Valcárcel started working as a secretary at a car company and was hired as an extra for theater performances.

== Career ==
A she was working as a part-time receptionist on Panamerican televisión, channel 5, she publicly kissed the Venezuelan singer Oscar de León live on Peruvian television, she instantly launched her career. She started as a comic actress and a dancer ("vedette") in the programs Risas y Salsa and La gran Revista.

In 1987, Panamericana Televisión proposed conducting a Peruvian version of Hello Susana, which would be named "Alo Gisela". Valcárcel then became the queen of daytime television on Peruvian TV for several years during the late '80s and early '90s. Her guests have been famous Latin American stars such as Chayanne, Julio Iglesias, Luis Miguel, Guillermo Dávila, Ricardo Montaner, Shakira, María Antonieta de las Nieves, Isabel Pantoja, José Luis Rodríguez, Menudo, Ricky Martin, Thalía, Paulina Rubio, Rocío Dúrcal, and Paloma San Basilio. Her TV shows were always very popular due to her interaction with the audiences, including phone conversations on TV and offering advice to the audience, especially housewives. At the same time, she founded "Amarige Salon & Urban Spa", a beauty parlor.

Gisela Valcárcel simultaneously hosted Saturday nighttime television shows in the late nineties and early 2000, including a local version of Big Brother named La Casa de Gisela.

Her latest project is a local version of Bailando por un sueño in franchise with Mexican TV station Televisa. In 2008, she suspended the magazine production of Gisela to work on Los Reyes de la Pista (Perú). In February 2009, she unveiled a new TV project: El Show de los Sueños, in a franchise with Televisa. In 2010, she hosted El Gran Show. In 2012, she hosted Operación Triunfo, the Peruvian version of Star Academy. However, in August she decided to return to the dance reality show El Gran Show.

Her company Espíritu y GV Producciones produced the mini series Llauca which premiered in 2021.

== Controversy ==
She was involved in a political scandal when a video of her with José Francisco Carreño Crousillat and Vladimiro Montesinos was released. The footage shows that Montesinos informed Valcárcel of measures to be taken to prevent the distribution of a book (La Señito by Carlos Vidal) that reveals intimate aspects of her life. This was denounced as an offense against public administration. A lawsuit was not filed since the judge dismissed the complaint and acquitted the parties involved of all charges.

== Personal life ==
On 10 June 1995, she married the soccer player Roberto Martínez Vera-Tudela. After some years, the couple divorced.

During the political scandal, Valcárcel also began a personal spiritual search that took her to India, where she met some religious leaders, including Sathya Sai Baba, and in the U.S. Deepak Chopra.

In 2006, after six years of romance, she married the Peruvian architect Javier Carmona. The couple separated shortly after the marriage.

She had a relationship with Jorge Pozo, with whom she had a daughter, Ethel Pozo, who was born in 1980.

== Publications ==
In 2005 her autobiography, My Name is Gisela, was published by Santillana Group. In it, she gives an account of her life from childhood, including her beginnings as a star and her coming to television as hostess of the program Aló Gisela.

If I talk about my sorrows and joys that is because what friends do: tell everything

— Gisela Valcarcel, at presentation of the book (translated from Spanish)

== Appearances ==
=== As hostess ===
- "Aló Gisela" (1987–1992) midday show on Panamericana Televisión Channel 5
- "Gisela en America" (1993-1994) midday show on América Televisión Channel 4
- "Así es Gisela" (1995) night show on Panamericana Televisión Channel 5
- "Gisela en América" (1996–1997) midday show on América Televisión Channel 4
- "Gisela contigo" (1998) midday show on Red Global Channel 13
- "Aló Gisela" (2000) midday show on Panamericana Televisión Channel 5
- "Gisela" (2001) night show on Panamericana Televisión Channel 5
- "Gisela" (2002) night show on Frecuencia Latina Channel 2
- "La casa de Gisela" (2003) night show on Frecuencia Latina Channel 2
- "Siempre Gisela" (2005) night show on Frecuencia Latina Channel 2
- "Bailando por un sueño" (2008) night show on Panamericana Televisión Channel 5
- "Los Reyes de la Pista" (2008) night show on Panamericana Televisión Channel 5
- El Show de los sueños (2009) night show on América Televisión Channel 4
- "El Gran Show" (2010) night show on America Television Channel 4

=== Public shows ===
- Teletón 2008–2010

=== In theatre ===
- La mujer del año - Teatro Canout
- "EL SUBMARINO" (1999)
- The Vagina Monologues (2010)

== Films ==
- Tarata (2008)

== Awards ==
Year	Award	Category	Program	Result
1997	Vitra Awards (Uruguay)	Award for her 10 years of experience as a social communicator in the Peruvian television	Award for her programs: Aló Gisela, Gisela en América, Así es Gisela.	Winner
2008	Premios a la Excelencia Anda 2009	Excellence in production and realization	Bailando por un sueño	Winner
2008	Premios a la Excelencia Anda 2009	Excellence in entertainment programs	Bailando por un sueño	Winner
2008	El Comercio Awards	Best competition program	Bailando por un sueño	Winner
2008	El Comercio Awards	Female face from the year	Bailando por un sueño	Winner
