= César Ritter =

Peruvian actor (born 1979)

Cesar Ritter
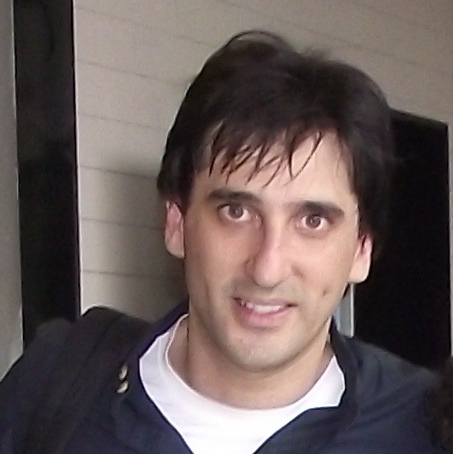
- Born: César Ernesto Ritter Burga; 30 August 1979 (age 46)
- Occupation: Actor

César Ernesto Ritter Burga (born in Lima, Peru on 30 August 1979) is a Peruvian actor. He is known for playing "Lalo" Chávez in Mil Oficios, Lorenzo Wilmer Vargas Vargas con harto de Sanchez in Así es la vida, Nicolás Bingley/Rita in Rita y Yo and the recurrent role of Manolo López in the television series Al Fondo Hay Sitio.

== Biography ==
He studied at the Alexander von Humboldt German school in Lima.

Ritter was involved in casting and directing a number of television series, such as One thousand jobs and Plop and Flynn.

== Filmography ==
Television
Year	Title	Role	Note	Ref
1997	Escándalo	Antonio "Toño"	Recurring	
2001–03	Mil oficios	Eduardo "Lalo" Chávez	Main role	
2003	Habla Barrio	"Lolo"	Supporting role	
2004–06, 2007–08	Así es la vida	Lorenzo Wilmer Sánchez Vargas	Main role	
2006	Virgenes de la Cumbia	Renato	Supporting role	
2007	Rita y yo	Nicolás Bingley / Rita	Main role	
2009	Rita y yo y mi otra yo	Nicolás Bingley / Rita	Main role	
2010	Los exitosos Gome$	Nacho	Supporting role	
2011	La santa sazón	Gastón Piña	Supporting role	
2011–12	Corazón de fuego	Jhon Kennedy Paredes	Supporting role	
2012	Solamente milagros	"Lucho" Corrales	1 episodio	
2014–15, 2016	Al fondo hay sitio	Manuel "Manolo" López	Recurring	
2014	Los Domingo	Julián	Recurring	
2017	Cumbia pop	Padre Fermín Gómez	Supporting role	
2019–20	Los Vílchez	Hamilton Rubio	Recurring	
2020	Te volveré a encontrar	Benigno Morales		
2020–21	Princesas	Tony Guerrero	Recurring	
2021	De vuelta al barrio	Josefo "Pepo" Bravo Meléndez	Main role	
2024	Súper Ada	José Luis "Pepe Lucho" Calderón	Main role	
2025-26	Eres mi bien	Alfonso "Foncho" Polar		

Theater
Year	Title	Role	Note	Ref
2004	Un misterio, una pasión	El cuervo		
2006–07	Escuela de payasos	Benito		
2006	Star Stone Opera Funk	J.R Rooker	Universidad de Lima	
2008	No pasa nada	Rodrigo	Centro Cultural PUCP	
2008	La familia Fernández	Micky		
2009	¿Dónde está el idiota?	Juan Culazzo	Teatro Peruano Japonés	
2009	Boeing boeing	Robert	Teatro Peruano Japonés	
2009	La noche de los asesinos	Lalo	Auditorio de la Muni. de San Isidro	
2010	Episodio II: La mujer del idiota	Erasmus Orgamus		
2010	Visitando al Sr. Green	Ross Gardiner	ICPNA Auditorium, Miraflores	
2010	Mi primera vez	Intérprete		
2010	Escuela de payasos	Benito	Reposición	
2010	Medea	Jasón		
2011	La doble inconstancia	El príncipe		
2011	Por accidente	Rodrigo	Teatro La Plaza	
2011	Escuela de payasos	Benito	Reposición	
2012	Drácula	Jonathan Harker	Teatro La Plaza	
2012–13	La vida es sueño	Segismundo	Main role, 3 temporadas	
2012	Cenando entre amigos	Gabriel	Teatro de Lucía	
2012	Velorio	Intérprete	Espectáculo de improvisación/1 función	
2013	Viaje de un largo día hacia la noche		Centro Cultural PUCP	
2013	Cuando tenía cinco años	Alberto	Teatro de Lucía	
2013	Falsarios	Tigre		
2014	Un hombre con dos jefes	Luigi Locateli	Teatro Pirandello	
2014	¿Dónde están los payasos?	Benito	Teatro Pirandello	
2015	Áreas Comunes	Bisagrita	La Taberna de Victoria Bar	
2015	Plop & Flyn	Plop	Teatro La Plaza	
2015	Una Historia Original	Narrador / Intérprete	Teatro Británico	
2015	Pinocho	Pinocho	Teatro Pirandello	
2016	Reglas para vivir	Intérprete	Teatro La Plaza	
2016	Plop & Wiwi	Plop	Teatro La Plaza	
2016	La Rebelión de los Conceptos		Centro Cultural Universidad del Pacífico	
2016	Noche de Reyes	Malvolio	Teatro Británico	
2017	Párajos	Halcón	Teatro Pirandello	
2017	Hasta las Patas	Roger	Teatro Pirandello	
2018	Renata y los Fantasma Buu	Papá de Renata	Teatro la Plaza	
2019	Más pequeños que el Guggenheim	Gorka	Teatro Julieta	
2019	Hedda	Eli Longford	Teatro Británico	
2020	Nuestro Fin	Daniel	Resiste Teatro 1 Episodio por Movistar Play	
2020	Tres Historias de Amor		Teatro La Plaza	
2021	¿Es Cupido?	Ramiro	2 Episodio por Movistar Play	
2021	3,2,1 Impro!	Intérprete	La Cúpula de las artes	

Films
Year	Title	Role	Note	Ref
2003	A Martian Named Desire	Ganso López	Antonio Fortunic - Película para TV	
2009	Como quién no quiere la cosa	Inválido	Álvaro Velarde	
2011	El guachimán	Teniente Vidaurre	Gastón Vizcarra	
2013	Plexus	Kronski	Jean Paul Du Bois - Corto	
2013	El Secreto de Joaquín	Ernesto	Jonathan Arriaga - Corto	
2014	Viejos amigos	Sacerdote	Fernando Villarán	
2016	El Candidato	Honorato Contreras	Álvaro Velarde	
2016	Margarita	Charly	Frank Pérez-Garland	
2016	Sombras	Miguel	Julio Wissar - Corto	
2017	Cebiche de tiburón	Gato	Daniel Winitzky	
2017	Destiempo	Manuel	Corto	
2017	The Solar System	Pável del Solar	Chinón Higashionna, Bacha Caravedo, Daniel Higashionna	
2017	Aj Zombies!	Arias	Daniel Martín Rodríguez	
2018	How to Get Over a Breakup	Lorenzo	Bruno Ascenzo - Invitado	
2018	Margarita 2	Charly	Frank Pérez-Garland	
2020	The Best Families	Andrés	Javier Fuentes-León	
2020	Romulo & Julita	Padre Lautaro	Daniel Martín Rodríguez	
2021	Autoerotic	Papá de Bruna	Andrea Hoyos	
2023	Isla Bonita	Sergio	Ani Alva Helfer	
2023	The Last Laugh	Javi Fuentes	Gonzalo Ladines	

== Awards and nominations ==
Ritter has been nominated for several Premios Luces with the latest being in 2021.

Year	Award	Category	Work	Result
2013	Luces Awards	Actor de reparto de Teatro	Viaje de un largo día hacia la noche	Nominated
2014	Luces Awards	Mejor actor de TV	Al fondo hay sitio	Nominated
2015	Luces Awards	Mejor actor de TV	Al fondo hay sitio	Nominated
2016	Luces Awards	Mejor actor de Reparto	Margarita	Nominated
2021	Luces Awards	Mejor Actor de Cine	The Best Families	Nominated
