= Vez =

Vez may refer to:

== People ==
- Irantzu Garcia Vez (born 1992), Spanish curler
- Jean-Luc Vez (1957–2017), Swiss administrative lawyer and head of the Federal Office of Police of Switzerland
- León Ávalos y Vez (1906–1991), Mexican mechanical engineer
- Sergio Vez (born 1994), Spanish curler
- El Vez, stage name of Mexican-American singer-songwriter and musician Robert Alan Lopez (born 1960)

== Places ==
- Věž, a municipality and village in the Czech Republic
- Vez, Oise, a commune in France
- Vez River, Portugal

== See also ==
- Tal Vez (disambiguation)
- Vèze, Cantal, France
