= San Silvestre School =

- Colegio San Silvestre

Location
- Av. Santa Cruz 1251, Miraflores; Lima; Peru

Information
- Type: Private
- Motto: I am, I can, I ought, I will
- Established: 1932
- Head teacher: Michael Bardsley
- Grades: Early Years, Primary section: 1-5, Secondary section: Forms 6-VI
- Gender: girls
- Campus: Urban
- Affiliation: ADCA (Asociación de Colegios Privados de Asociaciones Culturales), LAHC (Latin American Heads Conference), GSA (Girls' Schools Association)
- Primary language: English

San Silvestre School is a British-Peruvian private school located in the centre of the upscale district of Miraflores, Lima, Peru. The program is girls only, non-residential and extends from early childhood (age 3) through Form VI (age 18). It is divided into Early Years (ages 3–7) Primary (age 7-11, 2nd to 5th grade)) and Secondary (age 12-18, 6th grade and Forms I to VI) sections. Infant and Nursery school classes are held across the street from the main school in the district of Miraflores. San Silvestre has many publicly recognized ex-pupils such as world surfing champion Sofia Mulanovich Aljovín and former Peruvian congresswoman Anel Townsend Diez Canseco.

Total enrolment is about 1400 (about 100 girls in each year or promotion from Reception to Form VI and the rest in Early Years and Form VI). Although a variety of different nationalities can be found amongst the students, most are Peruvian. Graduation is after Form V, when most students have spent all 12 years in the school. Form VI is optional and is the final year of the IB programme. The majority of Form V girls continue to Form VI.

The school year is divided into 4, 9 week long bimesters, with a mark each and a 5th one in Senior School which comes from yearly internal examinations given at the end of the 3rd bimester. Separate marks are awarded for effort and achievement. Weekly, school assemblies are held. School hours are from 8am to 3:30pm with 3 breaks. Many also stay for extracurricular activities (it is compulsory to choose at least one in the lower years of senior school) which may be sports or artistic. There are also Girl Guide meetings.

== Languages ==
Early Years classes are taught entirely in English while the rest of the school follows a bilingual Spanish-English programme to achieve fluency in both languages. French is compulsory from 4th grade until Form II. In Forms III and IV there are optional French, Italian and Mandarin Chinese classes.

== Examinations ==
The school offers 2 types of international examinations: the University of Cambridge IGCSE programme (International General Certificate of Secondary Education) examinations and the International Baccalaureate Diploma programme examinations. The IGCSE programme is followed in Forms III and IV. English, Spanish, mathematics and combined science are compulsory and the rest are chosen by the student. The IB 2 year programme can be followed by students in Form V and Form VI. Both international examinations are taken in November while there are mock exams in July of the year the examination will be taken.

== Uniform ==
San Silvestre has a compulsory school uniform which consists of a kilt, white blouse, green knee high socks, green cardigan and burgundy shoes. In Winter a white turtleneck, green corduroy trousers, a green waistcoat and a fleece jacket may be worn, while in Summer a green skort and sandals (which must have something holding the ankle) may be worn. Girls in form V also wear their prom jacket. The school has clear expectations regarding the use of uniform.

The physical education uniform consists of mostly white running shoes, green tracksuit or green shorts, white sweatshirt, white or House motif prom t-shirt and white socks. There's a green swimsuit with school logo embroidery for swimming lessons and a green and white leotard for gymnastics.

Form VI does not have to wear the school uniform although they are asked to choose a dress code which they ought to follow throughout the year.

== House system ==
San Silvestre follows the British house system, students are given a school house when they start the early years program and belong to it for the rest of their lives. House membership is inherited from one generation to the next and all members of one family belong to the same House. Interhouse competitions are held and every bimester there are House afternoons: an afternoon of sports, academic and artistic competitions in which some girls participate, as contestants or cheering for their peers. Even ex-pupils participate in Interhouse competitions such as the knitted blanket competition etc.

The houses are named after important previous headmistresses. They are Hope (House colour: blue), Evans (House colour: yellow), Kufal (House colour: green) and Conroy (House colour: Red).

== History ==
San Silvestre started in 1932 when Miss Nellie Kufal began teaching a small group of British children. Originally called Cambridge House due to teaching the contents for Cambridge University examinations, the name was changed to "Colegio San Silvestre" in 1938 when the, then co-educational, school was recognized by the Peruvian Ministry of Education. At the time Peruvian laws prohibited the use of foreign words in school names.

After the death of Miss Kufal in 1944 the school continued under the direction of a group of teachers until the new Headmistress, Miss Margaret Evans, arrived from England. She reorganized it to be more like a British school, converted it to all girls, established the house system, annual school magazine, appointed school officials etc. Besides the English Headmistress the school had a "Directora" (Spanish for Headmistress) Dr. Sofia B. de Conroy, in charge of everything related to the Peruvian educational programme as part of the school's goal of teaching the best of both educational systems. An ex-pupil, she dedicated her entire life to the school and was known fondly as Miss Topy. The current Head of School is Mr. Michael Bardsley.

The School was accepted by the Cambridge University Examinations Syndicate in 1938 and announced the first three recipients of Cambridge University Certificates in Peru that year. It offers the IB (International Baccalaureate) diploma programme since 1992 and 1995 the school was accepted by the UK's Girls’ Schools Association (GSA). In addition, the school also belongs to several local associations such as ADCA.

== Notable alumni ==
- Sofia Mulanovich Aljovin, professional surfer
- Anel Townsend Diez Canseco, Peruvian congresswoman
- Flavia Laos, actress and TV personality
- Alessandra de Osma
