= Gisela Ponce de León =

Peruvian TV and film actress

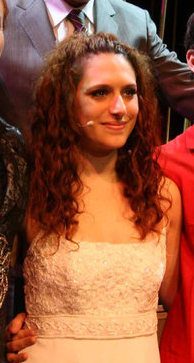
- Born: April 12, 1985 (age 41); Peru
- Occupations: Actress; dancer; singer
- Years active: 1996–present

Gisela Ponce de León Franco (born 12 April 1985) is a Peruvian film, television and stage actress and singer. Gisela began working professionally as a child actor on the musical Annie and in other productions. She appeared in several more musicals before being selected for the lead role in the hit TV show Esta Sociedad. In Peru, she played as Sofia in the musical Mama Mia.

In her country has starred in the musicals Cabaret, La Cage aux Folles, Next to normal and Our Town. She played Mary Warren in Las Brujas de Salem, Rachel Corrie in My Name Is Rachel Corrie and Penny Pingleton in Hairspray.

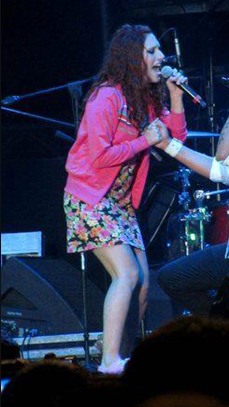
Ponce de León in 2010.

== Early life ==
Gisela used to live in Cercado de Lima and study at Colegio de Jesús. When she was a child, she took ballet, singing and dancing classes. As an adolescent, she participated in Nubeluz.

== Career ==
After being part of several TV shows, Gisela decided to apply to the ETUC (Pontificia Universidad Católica del Perú's Theatre School).

She made her debut as a film actress in the short film "Besando a tu papá" (Kissing your dad) at 2007 and lent her voice to the role of Tiffany in the Peruvian animated film "Valentino y el clan del can" (Valentino and the dongs' clan) the next year.

At 2010, Ponce de Leon participated in "El Gran Show", a reality show whose hostess was Gisela Varcárcel. She took the first place. Parallel, she starred two musicals: "El Musical 2010" and "La Cage aux Folles".

She served as the opening act for the Paramore's South America Tour at 2011. She started her career as a radio hostess in the radio station Studio92 at 2012 and as a TV hostess in the Frecuencia Latina's programme "Ponte Play" the next year.

== Theatre ==
List of credits in theatre as an actress
Year	Title	Role	Notes
1996	Annie	Peeper	
2004	El Principito	Rose garden	
2005	La Corporacion	Various roles	
2005	El Mercader de Venecia	Porcia	
2006	Broadway nights	Christine Daaé	
2006–2007	Escuela de payasos	Pimpola	Lead role
2007	Sueño de una noche de verano	Hermia	
2007	My Name Is Rachel Corrie	Rachel Corrie	Lead role
2007	Peru Ja Ja	Performer	Voice
2007	Canta la cloaca	Griselda	Lead role
2007	Tartufo	Mariana	
2008	El teniente de Inishmore	Mairead	
2008	Noche de tontos	Olivia	
2008	Cuatro amigos en busca de la chompa perdida	La osa florentina	
2008	Feisbuk	Stefani	Lead role
2009	Cabaret	Sally Bowles	Lead role Teatro Segura
2009	Una Pulga en la Oreja	Antuanette	
2009	Incierto Concierto	Franccesca	Lead role
2009–2010	Las Brujas de Salem	Mary Warren	Teatro La Plaza
2010	El Enfermo imaginario	Antoñita	
2010	El musical 2010	Various roles	
2010	The Vagina Monologues	Performer	
2010	La Cage aux Folles	Anne Dindon	
2010	Escuela de Payasos	Pimpola	Revival
2011	Next to Normal	Natalie Goodman	Lead role
2011	La chica del Maxim	Coco	Lead role
2011	Escuela de Payasos	Pimpola	Revival
2011–2012	La fiesta de cumpleaños	Lulu	
2012	Hairspray	Penny Pingleton	Teatro Peruano Japonés
2012	Nuestro pueblo (Our Town)	Emily Webb	Teatro La Plaza
2013	Black Comedy	Carol Melkett	
2014	Where are the Clowns?	Pimpola	

== Filmography ==
List of film credits as an actress
Year	Title	Role	Notes
2007	Besando a tu Papá	Liuva	Short film
2008	Valentino y el clan del can	Tifanny	Voice
2009	Cu4tro	Gabriela	
2013	Quizás mañana	Natalia	Lead role
2013	Asu Mare	Isabel "Chabela" Vilar	
2013	Rocanrol 68	Bea	
2015	Just Like in the Movies	Dani	
2017	The Solar System	Edurne	
2018	How to Get Over a Breakup	María Fé	
2022	The Truth of Xanaxtasia		
2023	The Erection of Toribio Bardelli	Sara Bardelli	
2023	How to Deal With a Heartbreak	María Fé	
2023	The Last Laugh	Alfonsina	

List of television credits as an actress
Year	Title	Role	Notes
2006	Esta Sociedad	Mirkala	Lead role
2008	Esta Sociedad 2	Mirkala	Lead role
2009	Rita y yo y mi otra yo	Anís	
2011	Ana Cristina	María Julia Benavides Aragón	
2015	Al Fondo Hay Sitio	Ariana Romero Benavides	

List of television credits as herself
Year	Title	Role	Notes
2000	Karina y sus amigos	Karinchiquitina	Dance cast
2010	El gran show	Contestant	Winner
2010	El gran show: reyes del show	Contestant	3° place
2012	Yo soy	Guest judge	Casting week
2013	Ponte Play	Host	
2014	La voz kids (Perú)	Guest mentor	
