= Cebiche de tiburón =

- Theatrical release poster
- Directed by: Daniel Winitsky
- Written by: Daniel Winitsky
- Starring: Manuel Gold; César Ritter
- Narrated by: Carlos Alcántara
- Cinematography: Matias Nicolas
- Music by: Andrés Landavere
- Production company: Cebiche de tiburón Films
- Distributed by: Cinecolor
- Release date: February 2, 2017
- Running time: 105 minutes
- Country: Peru
- Language: Spanish

Cebiche de tiburón (lit. 'Shark Ceviche') is a 2017 Peruvian adventure comedy film directed by Argentinean Daniel Winitsky.

== Synopsis ==
Cebiche de tiburón tells the story of an aspiring cook named Pato (Manuel Gold) who, following the crazy suggestions of two sorcerers (charlatans, healers), decides to participate and win the National Cooking Contest with a secret recipe that they recommend. Within the recipe, he publicly commits himself to go down to the bottom of the sea in person, find a sleepy shark, wake him up, and make ceviche. The result is an adventure that he never thought he would live, but he will not do it alone, Pato will experience these situations in the company of Gato (César Ritter), an unemployed salesman and childhood friend. Together they must overcome their fears, face enemies, reach a remote part of the Pacific Ocean and dive without a cage inside a shoal of sharks.

== Cast ==
- Manuel Gold as Pato
- César Ritter as Gato
- Wendy Ramos as Cascabel
- Sergio Galliani as Toyo Gordo
- Francisca Aronsson as Chinchis
