= Margarita 2 =

- Theatrical release poster
- Directed by: Frank Pérez-Garland
- Written by: Alberto Rojas Apel; Vanessa Saba
- Produced by: Gustavo Sánchez
- Starring: Francisca Aronsson; Giovanni Ciccia; Melania Urbina
- Cinematography: Roberto Maceda Kohatsu
- Edited by: Angela Vera Temoche
- Music by: Jose Manuel Barrios
- Production companies: Elefante Miope; La Soga Producciones
- Release date: August 2, 2018
- Running time: 88 minutes
- Country: Peru
- Language: Spanish

Margarita 2 (also known as: Margarita 2 y la banda de los hermanos mayores, lit. 'Margarita 2 and the band of older brothers') is a 2018 Peruvian comedy film directed by Frank Pérez-Garland and written by Alberto Rojas Apel & Vanessa Saba. It is a sequel to the 2016 Peruvian film Margarita. The film stars Giovanni Ciccia, Francisca Aronsson, Melania Urbina, Cesar Ritter, Vanessa Saba, Maria Grazia Gamarra and Yvonne Frayssinet. The film was released on August 2, 2018.

== Synopsis ==
Margarita will discover that he will have one less brother and, before this, he will launch a plan during a vacation organized by his father on a northern beach.

== Cast ==
The actors participating in this film are:

- Francisca Aronsson as Margarita
- Giovanni Ciccia as Rafo
- Melania Urbina as Claudia
- Vanessa Saba as Sandra
- César Ritter as Charlie
- Maria Grazia Gamarra as Thalia
- Yvonne Frayssinet as Rebeca

== Reception ==
At the end of the year, the film attracted a total of 258,585 viewers, becoming the tenth highest-grossing Peruvian film of 2018.
