= Solar System (disambiguation) =

The Solar System comprises the Sun and the objects that orbit it, including the satellites of those objects.

Solar System may also refer to:

- a photovoltaic system, alternately called a "solar system"
- a star's planetary system, sometimes referred to as a "solar system"
- The Solar System (film), a 2017 Peruvian-Spanish comedy-drama film
- "Solar System" (song), a 1977 song by the Beach Boys
- "II. Solar System", a song by the Microphones from Mount Eerie (album)
- Solar System (TV series), a 2024 BBC TV miniseries
