= El candidato =

El Candidato may refer to:

- The Candidate (1959 film), Argentine drama film
- El Candidato (1978 film) Colombian comedy in List of Colombian films
- El candidato (1999 telenovela), Mexican telenovela in List of TV Azteca telenovelas and series
- El Candidato (2016 film), Peruvian political comedy satire film
- El Candidato (TV series), 2020 Mexican political thriller web television series
