= Flavia Laos =

Peruvian actress, TV host, singer, model

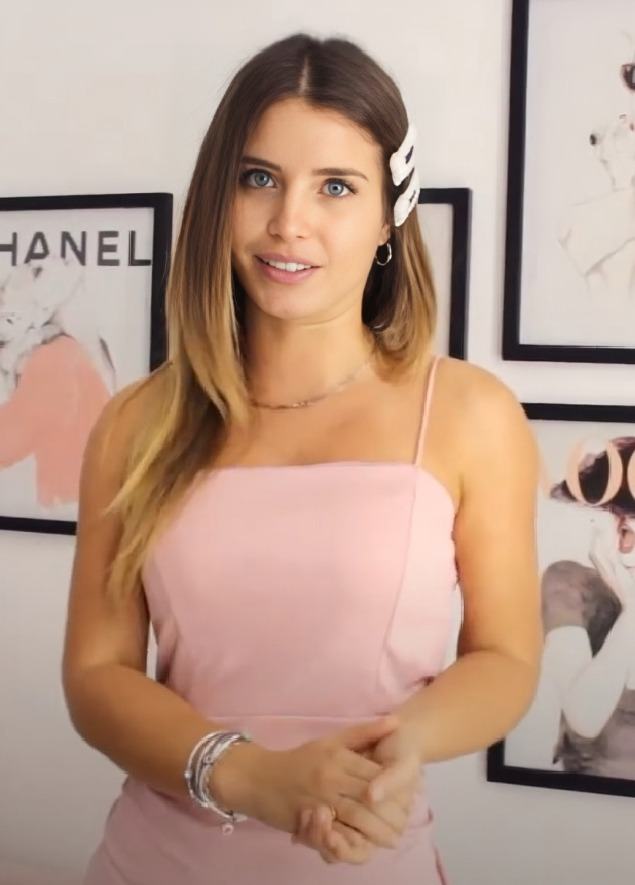
- Born: Flavia Laos; August 1, 1997 (age 29); Madrid, Spain
- Education: Scientific University of the South
- Occupations: Actress; TV host; singer; model
- Height: 1.58 m (5 ft 2 in) (2023)
- Musical career
- Genres: Pop, Latin Pop, Reggaeton
- Instrument: Vocals
- Years active: 2005–present

Flavia Laos Urbina (born August 1, 1997) is a Spanish-born Peruvian TV host, singer, influencer and model. She appeared as a contestant in the reality television series Too Hot to Handle. In 2019, she released her debut music album, Despierta.

In 2022, she won the "Latin Influencer of the Year" award at the People's Choice Awards, the very first Peruvian winner of this category.

Laos learned to speak English at the San Silvestre School and Colegio Villa María. Afterwards, she decided to pursue a career in nutrition at the Scientific University of the Perú.

== Filmography ==
=== Film ===
- No me digas solterona
- El Niño Dios

=== Television ===
- Miss Pequeñita
- Hora Wanner
- America Kids
- Ven, baila, quinceañera
- VBQ: Todo Por La Fama
- VBQ: Empezando a Vivir
- Los Vílchez
- Te volveré a encontrar
- Princesas
- Too Hot to Handle

=== Reality TV appearances ===
- Combate
- La Academia
- Reto De Campeones
- Esto es guerra
- Too Hot to Handle

== Discography ==
- 2017 - Reto de campeones (with Yamal & George)
- 2017 - Amor Infinito (with Pablo Heredia)
- 2017 - Ese beso con tu nombre (with Pablo Heredia)
- 2017 - Venga usted (with Nico Ponce and Donny Caballero)
- 2019 - Despierta (EP)

== Awards ==
- Influencer of the Year – People's Choice Awards 2022
- Mejor compositor urbano por la Asociación Peruana de Autores y Compositores, mejor conocido como APDAY
