= Súper Ada =

- Genre: Telenovela
- Created by: Maricarmen Marín
- Written by: Eduardo Adrianzén; Rogger Vergara; Alexa Centurió
- Directed by: Luis Barrios; Miluska Rosas
- Creative director: Cinthia Rodríguez
- Starring: Maricarmen Marín; Patricia Barreto; Pablo Heredia; César Ritter; Korina Rivadeneira; Virna Flores
- Theme music composer: Sebastián Martins; Maricarmen Marín; Jesús Rodríguez
- Opening theme: "Mi corazón tun tun" by Gali
- Composer: Juan Carlos Fernández
- Country of origin: Peru
- Original language: Spanish
- No. of seasons: 1
- No. of episodes: 58

Production
- Executive producer: Rocío Ibérico Arca
- Producers: Maricarmen Marín; César Arana Díaz
- Camera setup: Multi-camera
- Production company: ProTV Producciones

Original release
- Network: América Televisión
- Release: 15 January – 5 April 2024

Súper Ada is a Peruvian telenovela created by Maricarmen Marín. It stars Marín as the title character, alongside Pablo Heredia, César Ritter, Korina Rivadeneira and Virna Flores. The series aired on América Televisión from 15 January 2024 to 5 April 2024.

== Plot ==
Ada is a 30-year-old single mother with an 8-year-old daughter, Ely. She lives with her 17-year-old sister, Jessy, and her mother, Olga. Ada has had bad luck in love; her daughter's father abandoned her, and she makes ends meet by working odd jobs, as she's an administrator and can't find work in her field. But she remains optimistic, which she demonstrates through her singing and songwriting. An accident involving her mother changes everything. While searching through Olga's belongings for money to help cover expenses, Ada finds a letter revealing that Olga isn't her biological mother. This sets Ada on a journey to uncover the mystery, a quest that leads her into countless predicaments as she tries to find the truth and work to support her family. Along the way, she finds love with Leonardo, a creative advertising executive from a different social class, who falls for Ada's eccentricities and unique personality.

== Cast ==
- Maricarmen Marín as Ada Morales Rivera
- Pablo Heredia as Leonardo Maximiliano "Leo" Alcázar de la Fuente
- César Ritter as José Luis "Pepe Lucho" Calderón
- Teddy Guzmán as Alucarda
- Virna Flores as María Victoria González Pérez "La Bárbara"
- Liliana Alegría as Olga Rivera
- Sandro Calderón as Donald "Pato" Vázquez
- Valentina Casfer as Elisa "Ely" Montoya Morales
- Arianna Fernández as Jessica "Jessy"
- Mateo Garrido Lecca as Gervacio "el Gomas"
- Andrea Luna as Melissa Calderón
- Rick Núñez as Ramiro Calderón
- Elsa Olivero as Dra. Mónica Muñoz
- Ebelin Ortiz as Enriqueta "Quitita" Palomino
- Diego Pérez Chirinos as Toribio Espergecio "el Trinche" / Thomas Expert
- Tommy Párraga as Néstor Vázquez Palomino
- Korina Rivadeneira as Macarena Williams Pigneo-Pentales
- Leslie Stewart as Pilar de la Fuente
- Sebastián Stimman as Felipe Parodi Muñoz
- Óscar Jesús as Roy "Rollito" Huamán / Roy "Rollito" Vázquez Palomino

== Reception ==
The telenovela premiered on 15 January 2024, with a percentage rating of 13.8 points, beating its timeslot competitor, the reality show El gran chef famosos. It positioned itself in second place in the overall primetime audience.
