= Just Like in the Movies =

- Theatrical release poster
- Spanish: Como en el cine
- Directed by: Gonzalo Ladines
- Written by: Gonzalo Ladines
- Produced by: Lorena Ugartech
- Starring: Manuel Gold; Pietro Sibille; Andres Salas; Gisela Ponce de León
- Cinematography: Pato Fuster
- Edited by: Chino Pinto
- Music by: La Sound Facktory
- Production company: Señor Z
- Release date: November 12, 2015
- Running time: 100 minutes
- Country: Peru
- Language: Spanish

Just Like in the Movies (Spanish: Como en el cine) is a 2015 Peruvian comedy film written and directed by Gonzalo Ladines, one of the creators of Los Cinéfilos, in his directorial debut. The film was selected as the Peruvian representative to compete in the Best Ibero-American Film category at the 31st Goya Awards, but was not nominated.

== Synopsis ==
After learning that his girlfriend took him out on his own “Star Wars” sheets, Nico decides to rediscover his true love: the movies. For this mission, he brings together his old classmates, with whom he tries to make a very low-budget short film. Together they live absurd situations, between reality and fiction, that lead them to question their friendship and the direction of their lives.

== Cast ==
- Manuel Gold as Nico
- Pietro Sibille as Rolo
- Andres Salas as Bruno
- Gisela Ponce de León as Dani

== Production ==
The filming of the film lasted a month and began in Lima at the end of April 2015.

== Release and reception ==
Just Like in the Movies premiered in Peruvian theaters on November 12, 2015. The film brought 76 thousand viewers to the cinema in its first weekend in theaters. At the end of the year, it brought 227,714 thousand viewers to the cinema, becoming the fourth best national premiere of 2015.
