= Mis tres Marías =

- Genre: Telenovela
- Created by: Víctor Falcón; Eduardo Adrianzén
- Written by: Silvina Frejdkes; Keyber Rojas; Alejandro Quesada
- Directed by: Francisco Álvarez; Aldo Salvini; Sandro Mendez
- Starring: David Villanueva; Vanessa Saba; Maria Grazia Gamarra; Silvana Cañote; Zoe Arévalo; Christian Domínguez; Stefano Salvini; Mauro Ramírez; Pierina Carcelén; Fiorella Díaz; Haydeé Cáceres
- Opening theme: María by Christian Domínguez and Erick Elera / Maria Grazia Gamarra
- Country of origin: Peru
- Original language: Spanish
- No. of episodes: 79

Production
- Executive producer: Adriana Álvarez
- Producer: Michelle Alexander
- Production locations: Lima, Peru
- Camera setup: Multiple-camera setup
- Running time: 60 minutes
- Production company: Del Barrio Producciones

Original release
- Network: América Televisión
- Release: July 19 – November 8, 2016

Mis tres Marías (English title: My Three Daughters) is a Peruvian telenovela, produced and broadcast by América Televisión in 2016. The show is produced by Michelle Alexander and stars Andrea Montenegro, David Villanueva, Maria Grazia Gamarra, Silvana Canote, Zoe Arevalo, Vanessa Saba, Paul Martin, Karina Jordan, and Rebecca Raez. Ricky Tosso starred in the show as one of the series' antagonists, Gaspar, but had to take a leave of absence due to health issues. His role was later recast with Óscar Carrillo. In July 2016 the show was the highest rated telenovela in Peru.

One of the actors in the show, Vanessa Saba, has commented that she feels that the show has a "lot of heart".

== Cast ==
- Andrea Montenegro as Elena Sanchez of Navarro
- David Villanueva as Leonardo Navarro Madrid / Julian
- Maria Grazia Gamarra as Maria Esperanza Navarro Sanchez
- Silvana Canote as Maria Soledad Navarro Sanchez
- Zoe Arevalo as Maria Paz Navarro Sanchez / Rafaella Belaunde Elizalde
- Vanessa Saba as Jacqueline Elizalde de Belaunde
- Paul Martin as Octavio Belaunde
- Karina Jordan as Emma Donayre Mirror
- Rebecca Raez as Olga Sanchez
- Mauro Ramirez es Marcelo
- Rodrigo Sanchez-Pattino as Francisco Ortega
- Julia Thayt as Dora de Ortega
- Elisa Tenaud as Yvette Ortega
- Maria Jose Cock as Yessenia Ortega
- Gonzalo Molina as Vincent
- Thiago Basurto as Chavito
- Emanuel Soriano as Halley
- Fiorella Days as Pamela
