= La Energía de Sonric'slandia =

Mexican television series

- Genre: Children's game show
- Created by: Javier Williams
- Starring: Allisson Lozano; Ricardo Margaleff; Jonathan Becerra
- Country of origin: Mexico
- No. of seasons: 1
- No. of episodes: 24

Production
- Executive producers: Javier Williams; Andrea Salas
- Running time: 44 minutes (without ads); 60 minutes (with ads)

Original release
- Network: Canal 5
- Release: March 2005 – December 2005

La Energía de Sonric'slandia is a Mexican 60-minute "action-sports" game show for kids that aired for one season on Televisa's Canal 5. It was created to promote healthy habits for children. The show also featured interviews with famous athletes, comedy sketches and live musical performances by various artists.

== Gameplay ==
Six children competed in three sports events for points. The events were based on skills in popular sports, such as basketball, baseball, American football and soccer.

== Guest stars ==
- Miguel Galván, comedian
- Omar Chaparro, comedian
- Christopher Uckermann, actor and singer
- Anahí, actress and singer
- Dulce María, actress and singer
- Maite Perroni, actress and singer
- Christian Chávez, actor and singer
- Alfonso Herrera, actor and singer
