= How to Deal With a Heartbreak =

- Peruvian theatrical release poster
- Spanish: Soltera codiciada 2
- Directed by: Joanna Lombardi
- Screenplay by: María José Osorio
- Based on: Soltera codiciada by María José Osorio
- Produced by: Enid "Pinky" Ramos
- Starring: Gisela Ponce de León; Karina Jordán; Jely Reátegui
- Cinematography: Fernando Cobián
- Edited by: Eric Williams
- Music by: Sebastián Escofet
- Production companies: El Arbol Azul; Magma Cine
- Distributed by: 3C Films (Argentina); Netflix (worldwide)
- Release date: July 6, 2023
- Running time: 102 minutes
- Countries: Peru; Argentina
- Language: Spanish

How to Deal With a Heartbreak (Spanish: Soltera codiciada 2, lit. 'Coveted single 2') is a 2023 comedy film directed by Joanna Lombardi from a screenplay written by María José Osorio. It is a sequel to the 2018 film How to Get Over a Breakup. Once again, it stars Gisela Ponce de León, Karina Jordán and Jely Reátegui, accompanied by Christopher von Uckermann, Salvador del Solar, Norma Martínez, Jason Day, Andrés Salas, Carlos Carlín and Ana María Orozco. It is based on the blog and book of the same name by María José Osorio.

== Synopsis ==
María Fe is in the midst of an existential crisis because her professional career was cut short by a pandemic that forced her to return to her parents' house at the age of 32. Now with the pressure of the publishing house where she works and with an increasingly closer delivery date, she must resume her career to finish her second book. María Fe will face her dilemmas as any sensible adult woman would: mess with the wrong guy.

== Cast ==
- Gisela Ponce de León as María Fe
- Karina Jordán as Natalia
- Jely Reátegui as Carolina
- Christopher von Uckermann as Santiago
- Carlos Carlín as Ramiro
- Jason Day
- Andrés Salas
- Salvador del Solar
- Norma Martínez
- Ana María Orozco

== Production ==
At the end of 2021, the creator of the story, María José Osorio, came up with the idea of developing a sequel to How to Get Over a Breakup which ended up being consolidated at the end of the same year under the production company El Árbol Azul.

=== Filming ===
Principal photography began on November 20, 2022 and ended 5 weeks later.

== Release ==
It premiered on July 6, 2023, in Peruvian theaters, then was released on August 3, 2023, in Argentine theaters, and worldwide on September 22, 2023, on Netflix.

== Accolades ==
Year	Award / Festival	Category	Recipient	Result	Ref.
2024	Luces Awards	Best Film	How to Deal With a Heartbreak	Nominated	
2024	Luces Awards	Best Actress	Gisela Ponce de León	Nominated	
2024	15th APRECI Awards	Best Supporting Actor	Salvador del Solar	Nominated	
