= Diablero =

Mexican television series

- Genre: Horror
- Created by: Pablo Tébar and José Manuel Cravioto
- Based on: El Diablo me obligó by Francisco Haghenbeck
- Written by: Pablo Tebar; Verónica Marza; Gibrán Portela; José Rodríguez; Luis Gamboa
- Directed by: José Manuel Cravioto; Rigoberto Castañeda
- Opening theme: "Futuro" by Café Tacuba
- Country of origin: Mexico
- Original language: Spanish
- No. of seasons: 2
- No. of episodes: 14

Production
- Executive producers: Pedro Uriol; Juan Gordon
- Production location: Mexico City, Mexico

Original release
- Network: Netflix
- Release: December 21, 2018 – January 31, 2020

Diablero is a Mexican television series produced by Morena Films for Netflix. The series is based on the book by Mexican writer Francisco Haghenbeck entitled El Diablo me obligó. The series premiered on 21 December 2018. The series was renewed for a second season in February 2019 which premiered on January 31, 2020.

The series was canceled after two seasons.

== Plot ==
The story revolves around Father Ramiro Ventura, a priest who seeks the help of the legendary demon hunter or "Diablero" Elvis Infante. With the help of Elvis's sister Keta and demon possessed Nancy Gama this unlikely team unleashes a series of events that could determine the fate of humanity.

== Cast ==
- Horacio García Rojas as Heliodoro "Elvis" Infante, a diablero
- Christopher von Uckermann as Father Ramiro Ventura
- Gisselle Kuri as Nancy Gama
- Fátima Molina as Enriqueta "Keta" Infante
- Dolores Heredia as Mamá Chabela
- Humberto Busto as Isaac 'El Indio'
- Mariana Botas as Thalia
- Dulce Neri as Paulina
- Flavio Medina as Cardinal Morelo
- Gerardo Taracena as Benito Infante
- Quetzalli Cortés as Wences
- Cassandra Iturralde as Mariana
- Ela Velden as Lupe Reyna
- Michel Duval as Alejandro / Tepoz / Ahuizotl

== Episodes ==
Season	Episodes	Originally released
1	8	December 21, 2018
2	6	January 31, 2020

=== Season 1 (2018) ===
No. overall	No. in season	Title	Directed by	Written by	Original release date
1	1	"The Demons Are Among Us" "Los demonios están entre nosotros"	José Manuel Cravioto	Luis Gamboa, Verónica Marzá, Gibrán Portela, José Rodríguez, Pablo Tébar	December 21, 2018
2	2	"Leg of a Dog, Heart of a Chicken" "Pata de perro, corazón de pollo"	José Manuel Cravioto	Verónica Marzá, José Rodríguez, Pablo Tébar	December 21, 2018
3	3	"The Hidden Children" "Los hijos ocultos"	José Manuel Cravioto	Bernardo Esquinca, Luis Gamboa, Gibrán Portela, Pablo Tébar	December 21, 2018
4	4	"An Arcane Incantation" "Conjuro arcano"	Rigoberto Castañeda	Bernardo Esquinca, Luis Gamboa, Gibrán Portela, Pablo Tébar	December 21, 2018
5	5	"The Conclave" "El cónclave"	Rigoberto Castañeda	Bernardo Esquinca, Verónica Marzá, José Rodríguez, Pablo Tébar	December 21, 2018
6	6	"A Woman Diablero" "Una mujer diablera"	Rigoberto Castañeda	Bernardo Esquinca, Laura Sarmiento Pallarés, Daniel Sánchez Arranz, Pablo Tébar	December 21, 2018
7	7	"Four Tombs" "Cuatro tumbas"	Rigoberto Castañeda	Bernardo Esquinca, Luis Gamboa, Verónica Marzá, Pablo Tébar	December 21, 2018
8	8	"Red Sky" "Cielo rojo"	José Manuel Cravioto	Bernardo Esquinca, Verónica Marzá, José Rodríguez, Pablo Tébar	December 21, 2018

=== Season 2 (2020) ===
No. overall	No. in season	Title	Directed by	Written by	Original release date
9	1	"Searching for Ventura" "Buscando a Ventura"	José Manuel Cravioto	Verónica Marzá, Augusto Mendoza, Pablo Tébar	January 31, 2020
10	2	"The Ahuizotl" "El Ahuizotl"	José Manuel Cravioto	Verónica Marzá, José Rodríguez	January 31, 2020
11	3	"Tears of the Devil" "Lágrimas de demonio"	José Manuel Cravioto	Laura Sarmiento Pallarés, Daniel Sánchez Arranz	January 31, 2020
12	4	"The Coatlicue" "La Coatlicue"	José Manuel Cravioto	Verónica Marzá, José Rodríguez, Pablo Tébar	January 31, 2020
13	5	"You Don't Choose Your Family" "Uno no escoge a la familia"	José Manuel Cravioto	Augusto Mendoza, Laura Sarmiento Pallarés, Daniel Sánchez Arranz, Pablo Tébar	January 31, 2020
14	6	"The Black Key" "La llave negra"	José Manuel Cravioto	Verónica Marzá, Augusto Mendoza, Pablo Tébar	January 31, 2020
