= Karina Jordán =

Peruvian actress

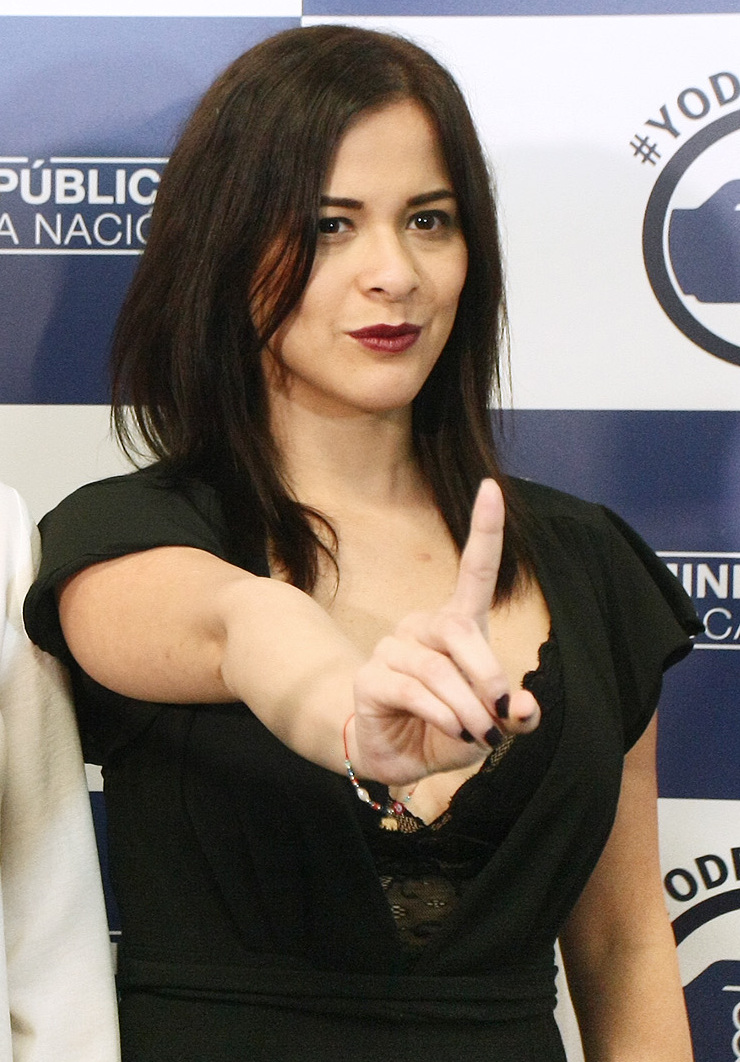
Image of Karina Jordán

Karina Fiorella Jordán Manrique (born December 18, 1985, in Lima) is a Peruvian actress.

She studied at the Pontifical Catholic University of Peru.

== Television and films ==
- Baila Reggaettón (2007) as Vanessa
- Golpe A Golpe (2007) as Belén Meléndez
- Sabrosas (2008) as Joselyn
- La Fuerza Fénix (2008) as Rina Sipagauta
- Clave Uno: Médicos En Alerta (2009) as Marcela Piqueras
- Ven Baila Quinceañera (2016) as Cristina Romero
- Mis tres Marías (2016) as Emma
- Caiga quien caiga (2018) as Marina
- How to Get Over a Breakup (2018) as Natalia
- Los Vilchez 2 (2019) as Erica
- Te volveré a encontrar (2020) as Elena Guadalupe Trelles / Elena Hernández Bravo-Jordán
- Princesas (2020) as Regina Ortega de Del Bosque
- Junta de vecinos (2021) as Dr. Natalia Alarcón Tarareta
- How to Deal With a Heartbreak (2023) as Natalia
- La vida que me robaste (2026) as Mariana Salazar Aguirre "La Diabla"

== Theatre ==
- Laberinto de mounstruos (2003)
- La Orestiada (2008)
- La Prisión de los Ángeles (2008)
- La Nona (2008)
- El Mentiroso (2008)
- La asombrosa fábula del Rey Ciervo (2009) as Ángela
- Rent (2010)
