= Youtuber Dad =

- Theatrical release poster
- Directed by: Fernando Villarán
- Written by: Gonzalo Ladines; Fernando Villarán
- Produced by: Alejandro Cacetta; Gonzalo Ladines; Veronica Perez Orbezo
- Starring: Carlos Carlín; Gianella Neyra; Pelo Madueño; Manuel Gold; Vanessa Saba
- Cinematography: Pato Fuster
- Edited by: Javier Becerra Heraud
- Production companies: Funny Games Films; Cinecolor Films; FAM Contenidos
- Release date: April 11, 2019
- Running time: 85 minutes
- Countries: Peru; Argentina
- Language: Spanish

Youtuber Dad (Spanish: Papá Youtuber) is a 2019 comedy film directed by Fernando Villarán and written by Villarán and Gonzalo Ladines. It stars Carlos Carlín, Gianella Neyra, Pelo Madueño, Manuel Gold and Vanessa Saba. It premiered on April 11, 2019, in Peruvian theaters.

== Synopsis ==
Rómulo is a father of a family with little sympathy for technology who is fired by his new boss, a young millennial. Desperate not to lose his home and after finding out that his wife is pregnant, he decides to become a YouTuber, for which he will need the help of his two misunderstood children.

== Cast ==
The actors participating in this film are:

- Carlos Carlin as Rómulo
- Gianella Neyra as Lucía
- Thiago Bejar
- Valentina Izquierdo
- Manuel Gold
- Analía Laos as Passenger taxi
- Pelo Madueño
- Ebelín Ortiz
- Rodrigo Palacios
- Jely Reátegui
- Vanessa Saba

== Production ==
Principal photography began at the end of August 2018 in the districts of Lima and Callao, and the recordings ended on September 25, 2018, after 4 weeks.

== Awards ==
| Year | Award | Category | Recipient | Result | Ref. |
|---|---|---|---|---|---|
| 2020 | Luces Awards | Best Film | Youtuber Dad | Nominated | |
| 2020 | Luces Awards | Best Actor | Carlos Carlín | Nominated | |
| 2020 | Luces Awards | Best Supporting Actress | Gianella Neyra | Won | |

== Remakes ==
At the end of January 2021 it was announced that the film will have 2 remakes made in France by StudioCanal and Spain by YouthPlanet Films.
