= Paradise Hotel (2019 film) =

Hotel Paraíso
- Theatrical release poster
- Directed by: Daniel Rehder
- Written by: Daniel Rehder
- Produced by: José María Navarro Almonacid; Daniel Rehder
- Starring: Kareem Pizarro; Jely Reátegui; Marco Zunino; Francisca Aronsson
- Cinematography: Julián Estrada
- Edited by: Daniel Martín Rodríguez
- Music by: La Sound Facktory
- Production companies: 111 Producciones; Rehder Films
- Distributed by: New Century Films
- Release date: January 24, 2019
- Running time: 105 minutes
- Country: Peru
- Language: Spanish

Paradise Hotel (Spanish: Hotel Paraíso) is a 2019 Peruvian comedy film written, directed and co-produced by Daniel Rehder in his directorial debut. The film stars Kareem Pizarro, Jely Reátegui, Marco Zunino and Francisca Aronsson. It premiered on January 24, 2019, in Peruvian theaters.

== Synopsis ==
Guillermo will live a thousand adventures with his cousins, during their vacations in a hotel in Ica, to fall in love with Andrea. Guillermo will have to face his insecurities and Nahel who also has feelings for the young woman.

== Cast ==
The actors participating in this film are:

- Kareem Pizarro as Guillermo
- Fabiana Valcárcel as Andrea
- Brando Gallesi as Nahel
- Francisca Aronsson as Lucía
- Carolina Cano as Gisella
- Katia Condos
- Matías Raygada
- Jely Reategui
- Andrés Salas
- Pietro Sibille
- Marco Zunino

== Reception ==
Paradise Hotel drew a total of 41,465 viewers to the theater.
