= Quizás mañana =

- Film poster
- Directed by: Jesús Alvarez Betancourt
- Written by: Jesús Alvarez Betancourt
- Produced by: Adolfo Aguilar; Jesus Alvarez Betancourt; Hugo Shinki; Sandro Ventura
- Starring: Bruno Ascenzo; Gisela Ponce de León
- Cinematography: Hugo Shinki
- Edited by: José Carlos Barletti; Sandro Ventura
- Music by: Ricardo Núñez
- Production company: Big Bang Films
- Release date: February 14, 2013
- Running time: 87 minutes
- Country: Peru
- Language: Spanish

Quizás mañana (lit. 'Maybe tomorrow') is a 2013 Peruvian romantic drama film written and directed by Jesús Alvarez Betancourt (in his directorial debut) and starring Bruno Ascenzo and Gisela Ponce de León.

== Synopsis ==
Juan Carlos and Natalia are two young people who are going through a particularly difficult day. They both meet on the streets of Magdalena del Mar and without knowing each other, they decide to keep each other company. For some reason they make a connection and spend a day together talking, laughing, getting angry, having a true catharsis that will mark their lives forever.

== Cast ==
The actors participating in this film are:

- Bruno Ascenzo as Juan Carlos
- Gisela Ponce de León as Natalia
- Roger del Águila as Waiter
- Carolina Cano as Juan Carlos' Sister
- Javier Echevarría as Juan Carlos' Father
- Liliana Trujillo as Saleswoman

== Production ==
Filming began on May 6, 2012, in Lima (Magdalena del Mar) and concluded the same month. It is the second production of Big Bang Films and has Sandro Ventura as producer.

== Reception ==
=== Box-office ===
The film managed to convene five thousand people on the day of its premiere in Lima and twenty thousand in its first week. It had more than five thousand spectators in its debut in the provinces.

=== Awards ===
Year	Award	Category	Recipient	Result
2013	Premios Luces by El Comercio	Best film actress	Gisela Ponce de León	Won
