= Don't Call Me Spinster =

2018 film

- Film poster
- Spanish: No me digas solterona
- Directed by: Ani Alva H
- Written by: Ani Alva H, Sandra Percich
- Produced by: Sandro Ventura
- Starring: Patricia Barreto; Angélica Aragón; Flavia Laos; André Silva; Gino Pesaressi; Marisol Aguirre
- Cinematography: Hilda Melissa Holguín
- Music by: Mon Laferte
- Production company: Big Bang Films
- Distributed by: Big Bang Films
- Release date: March 29, 2018
- Running time: 108 minutes
- Country: Peru
- Language: Spanish
- Budget: USD$350,000

Don't Call Me Spinster (Spanish: No me digas solterona) is a 2018 Peruvian comedy film directed by Ani Alva H, starring Patricia Barreto, Angélica Aragón, Flavia Laos and Gino Pesaressi, with André Silva, Javier Saavedra and Marisol Aguirre in supporting roles.

== Plot ==
Located in modern Lima, Peru; No me digas solterona tells the story of a thirty-something-single businesswoman, Patricia, who believes that her boyfriend is going to propose to her. Instead, he asks for a "break" in their relationship. She's forced to return to live with her loving and wise over-protective mother; Tencha, and to listen to everyone's opinion of what she ought to do next.

== Cast ==
- Patricia Barreto as Patricia
- Angélica Aragón as Tencha
- Marisol Aguirre as María García
- Natalia Salas as Mariana
- Anahí de Cárdenas as Sol
- Flavia Laos as Belén
- Rodrigo Sánchez Patiño as Richi
- André Silva as José
- Fiorella Rodriguez as Meche
- Tito Vega as Mozo
- Yiddá Eslava as Chio
- Maricarmen Marin as Milagros
- Gino Pesaressi as Ignacio
- Javier Saavedra as Fernando
- Christian Rivero as Sergio
- Adolfo Aguilar as Guianluca
- Claret Quea as Mota

== Filming ==
The movie was filmed on location in Lima, Peru.

== Home media ==
The film will be released on Blu-ray Disc in 2018.
