= Christopher von Uckermann =

Mexican singer and actor (born 1986)

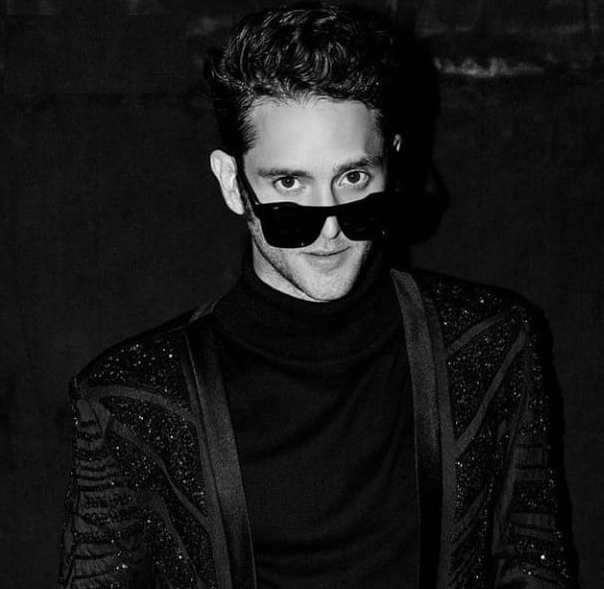
- Von Uckermann in 2020
- Born: Christopher Alexander Luis Casillas von Uckermann; 21 October 1986 (age 39); Mexico City, Mexico
- Other name: Christopher Uckermann
- Occupations: Singer; songwriter; actor
- Years active: 1993–present
- Musical career
- Genres: Latin pop; pop; alternative
- Label: Uckermann Música
- Formerly of: RBD

Christopher Alexander Luis Casillas von Uckermann (born 21 October 1986) is a Mexican singer and actor.

He started his acting career when he was only two years old in TV commercials, and became known worldwide after his roles as Diego Bustamante in the soap opera Rebelde and Father Ramiro Ventura in the supernatural horror web series Diablero.

He was a member of the band RBD from 2004 to 2009 and has been a solo artist since the band's split, having released one album, Somos, in 2010, and two EPs, La Revolución de los Ciegos in 2017 and Sutil Universo in 2020.

== Life and career ==
=== 1986–1999: Early life ===
Christopher Alexander Luis Casillas von Uckermann was born on 21 October 1986 in Mexico City, Mexico. His father, Víctor Manuel Casillas Arias, is from Tijuana, while his mother, Marie Christina Alexandra von Uckermann, is from Stockholm, Sweden. His maternal grandparents are from Berlin, Germany. Since he was two years old, he appeared in commercials in Mexico and the United States, winning "The Golden Eagle" at 11 years old for appearing in over 160 of these.

=== 1999–2001: First telenovelas ===
In 1999 he was cast in El diario de Daniela. He then starred in Amigos X Siempre in 2000, alongside Spanish-Mexican singer and actress Belinda Peregrín. In 2001, he acted in and wrote the theme song for the series Aventuras En El Tiempo.

=== 2004–2007: Rebelde and RBD: La familia ===
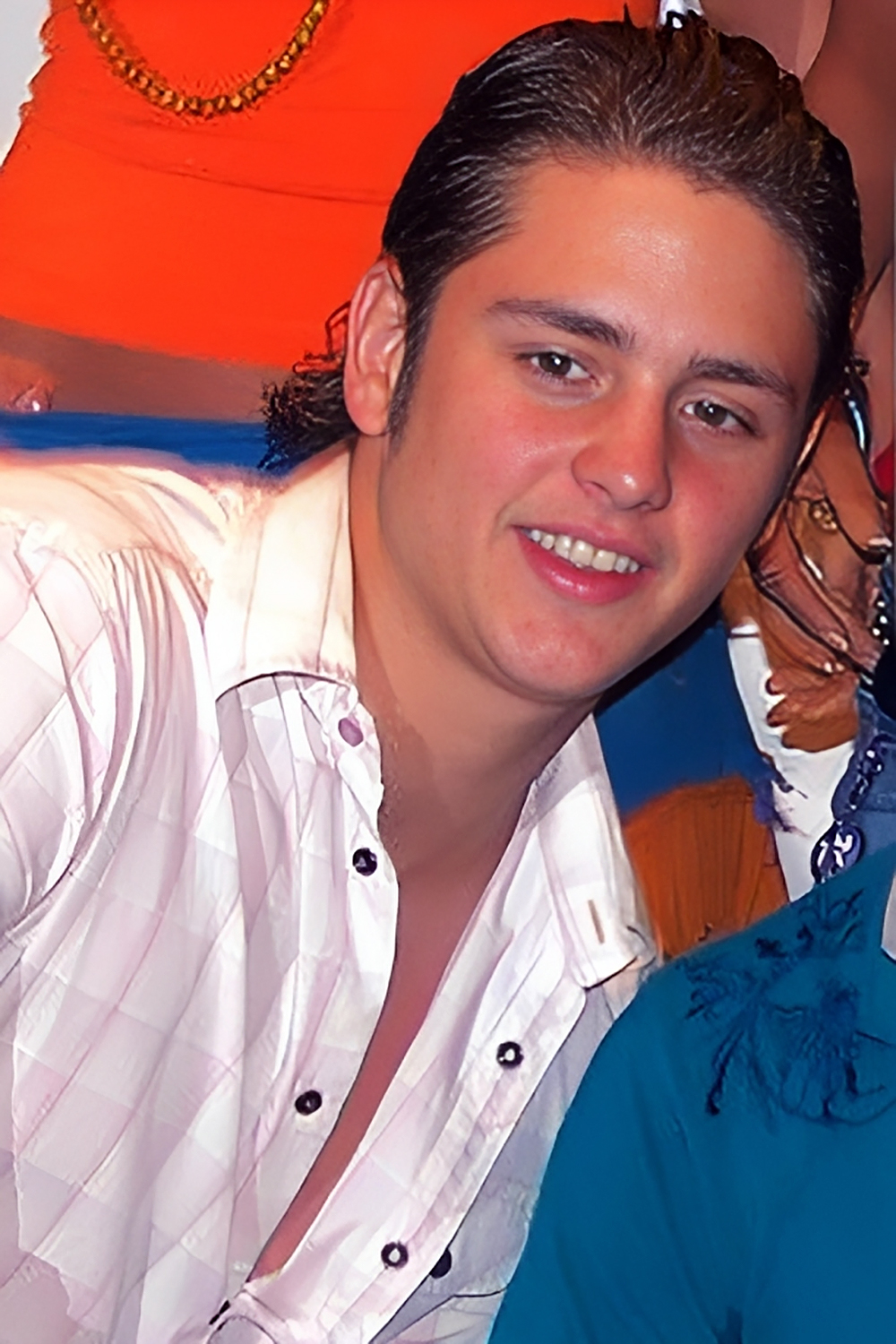
Von Uckermann in 2006

In summer of 2004, Uckermann was cast in the teen-oriented telenovela Rebelde, a remake of the famed Argentinean series, Rebelde Way, where he starred alongside Anahí, Dulce María, Alfonso Herrera, Christian Chávez, and Maite Perroni. He played Diego Bustamante, a student in the fictitious Elite Way School, son of a corrupt politician and with dreams of becoming a musician. The show ran from 2004 to 2006, totaling 440 episodes divided into three seasons.

Following the success of Rebelde, in 2007, Televisa released the sitcom RBD: La familia, which starred the members of RBD, and was based on the fictional lives of the group's members. The characters of the series were not based on the band's characters in Rebelde, but intended to be similar to the actors' real personalities. The show ran from 14 March through 13 June 2007, and only lasted 13 episodes.

=== 2009–present: Kdabra and Diablero ===
Uckermann starred in the hit TV series of mystery and science fiction Kdabra, produced in Latin America by Fox. The series was filmed in Bogotá, Colombia at the Majestic Hotel. It aired throughout Central and South America, eastern Europe and Japan. The series was shown in the United States on the now-defunct MundoFox network, a partnership attempt by Colombia's RCN Network and Fox International Channels, between 2012 and 2015.

On 21 December 2018, he starred in the Mexican television web series Diablero as Father Ramiro Ventura, which was made for and is streaming on Netflix. The show was renewed for a second season in February 2019, which was released on 31 January 2020. The series was cancelled in March 2022 after two seasons.

== Music career ==
=== 2004–2009: RBD ===
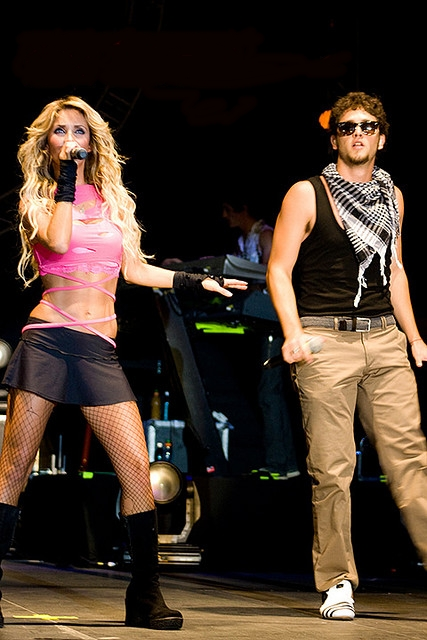
Von Uckermann (right) with RBD bandmate Anahí in 2008.

The success of Rebelde launched the pop-rock group RBD. To date, the band has recorded nine studio albums, including records in Spanish, Portuguese and English. They have sold over 20 million albums worldwide, and have toured across Mexico, South America, Serbia, Romania, Slovenia, the United States, and Spain. Uckermann composed and recorded the track "Sueles Volver", his only solo song, for RBD's fourth Spanish-language studio album, Empezar Desde Cero. On 15 August 2008, RBD released a message telling fans that they had decided to split up. They went on one final tour, Gira Del Adios World Tour which ended in December 2008, in Spain.

==== 2020–2023: Ser O Parecer: The Global Virtual Union and Soy Rebelde Tour ====
In September 2020, RBD announced that their music would finally be re-released on streaming platforms, accompanied by a virtual reunion show to celebrate. The show took place on 26 December, with only Uckermann, Anahí, Maite and Christian returning, with Dulce and Alfonso being absent for personal reasons. During the show, Uckermann performed the single "Inalcanzable" solo, a song where he originally did not sing. With Alfonso's absence, Uckermann was also able to have more solos and even sing in songs where his vocals were not present. The show was later released as a live album on streaming platforms on 10 June 2021.

In January 2023, he announced alongside all his bandmates (except Herrera) the Soy Rebelde Tour, with stops in the U.S., Colombia, Brazil, and Mexico, with the final show being held in Mexico City at the Estadio Azteca.

=== 2009–2017: SOMOS, La Revolucion de los Ciegos, and Sutil Universo ===
In February 2009, Uckermann announced that he would be releasing a new song as a solo artist, produced by Rudy Maya. The song, entitled "Light Up the World Tonight", was officially released on iTunes in March.

He recorded his debut solo album SOMOS in several cities throughout the world. The album was released in November 2010 and sold well throughout the US, Mexico and Brazil. In February 2012, Uckermann released an English-language single entitled "Million Dollar Man".

In 2017, he announced the release of a new project, an EP called La Revolución de los Ciegos ("The Revolution of the Blind"). To promote the album, he went on tour in Brazil, and released his new songs on his YouTube channel in August.

== Discography ==
=== Studio albums ===
- 2010: Somos

=== EP ===
- 2017: La Revolución De Los Ciegos
- 2020: Sutil Universo

=== Singles ===
- 2010: "Sinfonía" (music video)
- 2011: "Apaga La Máquina"
- 2011: "Right Now"
- 2012: "Million Dollar Man"
- 2013: "Sueño Surreal"
- 2020: "Sutil Universo"
- 2021: "Heal Together"
- 2024: "Bien Bien Singular"

=== Promo singles ===
- 2008: "Light up the World" (live music video)
- 2009: "Vivir Soñando" (music video)
- 2010: "Viver Sonhando"
- 2011: "Supernova"
- 2011: "Nos Van a Escuchar"

== Filmography ==
=== Film ===
Title	Year	Role
Hypnotized	2015	Advisor
Pacifico	2016	Tiago
Casi una gran estafa	2017	Alejandro
Cómo cortar a tu patán	2017	Leo
Soltera Codiciada	2018	Santiago
El hubiera sí existe	2019	Carlos
El país de las últimas cosas	2020	Sam
Soltera codiciada 2	2023	Santiago
Pacifìco	2026	Tiago

=== Television ===
Title	Year	Role
El diario de Daniela	1998-99	Christopher Robin
Amigos x siempre	2000	Santiago del Valle Villareal
Aventuras en el tiempo	2001	Ángel Del Huerto
Amy, la niña de la mochila azul	2004	Rolando
Rebelde	2004–06	Diego Bustamante
La Energía de Sonric'slandia	2005	Himself
RBD: La Familia	2007	Ucker
Lola, Érase Una Vez	2007	Himself
Skimo	2007	Himself
Verano de amor	2009	Himself
Diablero	2018-20	Father Ramiro Ventura

== Tours ==
- 2009: El Movimiento (Pocket Show)
- 2010: ShowCase Kdabra (world tour series "Kdabra")
- 2011: Somos World Tour
- 2019: Sutil Universo
