= Tal Vez (disambiguation) =

"Tal Vez" is a 2003 song by Ricky Martin.

Tal Vez may also refer to:

- "Tal Vez" (Paulo Londra song), 2019
- Tal Vez, a 2006 album by Los Primos de Durango
- "Tal Vez", a 1993 song by Marta Sánchez from the album Mujer
- "Tal Vez", a 2006 song by Kudai from the album Sobrevive
- "Tal Vez", a 2008 song by Magnate & Valentino from Don Omar's album El Pentágono: The Return
- "Tal Vez", a 2010 song by Christopher Von Uckermann from Somos
- "Talvez", a 2020 song by Caetano Veloso

== See also ==
- "Tal Vez, Quizá", 2001 song by Paulina Rubio
