= Isla Bonita (film) =

- Theatrical release poster
- Directed by: Ani Alva Helfer
- Written by: Ani Alva Helfer; Sandra Alva Helfer; Dorian Fernández Moris; Rogger Vergara Adriánzen
- Produced by: Dorian Fernández-Moris; Chichi Fernández Moris; Andrea Moberg
- Starring: Patricia Barreto; Saskia Bernaola; Emilia Drago
- Cinematography: Andres Paul Magallanes
- Edited by: Chemo Loli
- Production company: AV Films
- Distributed by: BF Distribution
- Release date: November 30, 2023
- Running time: 92 minutes
- Country: Peru
- Language: Spanish

Isla Bonita (lit. 'Cute Island') is a 2023 Peruvian comedy film co-written and directed by Ani Alva Helfer. It stars Patricia Barreto, Saskia Bernaola and Emilia Drago accompanied by César Ritter, Wales Pana, Alejandro Villagomez, Patricia Portocarrero, Herman Romero and Adriana Campos Salazar. It is about three friends who travel to the Amazon to leave their problems behind. It premiered on November 30, 2023, in Peruvian theaters.

== Synopsis ==
Andrea, Esperanza, and Roxana are struggling both in their personal and professional lives, questioning whether they have made the right decisions and are surrounded by the right people. The three friends decide to take a trip to the city of Iquitos, where they reflect on their lives and, decide whether it is time to end the routines that prevent them from finding happiness.

== Cast ==
- Patricia Barreto as Andrea
- Saskia Bernaola as Esperanza
- Emilia Drago as Roxana
- César Ritter as Sergio
- Wales Pana as Danny
- Alejandro Villagomez as Armando
- Herman Romero as Esperanza's dad
- Connie Joana as Lodge receptionist
- Dorian Fernández-Moris as Presenter
- Carlos León as Shaman
- Armando Machuca as Library Security
- Ruben Manrique as Apu
- Chichi Fernández Moris as Flutist
- Manuel Rafa as Richard, the bartender
- Luthiana Fernández Moris as Bookstore girl
- Diego Sánchez as Mime
- Llorch Sánchez as Singer
- Patricia Portocarrero
- Adriana Campos Salazar

== Production ==
Principal photography began on August 31, 2022, lasting 10 days in Iquitos, Peru.

== Box office ==
On its first day in theaters, the film debuted in first place with 18,000 spectators, then at the end of its first weekend it surpassed 100,000 spectators, replicating the success of Alva's previous feature Single, Married, Widowed, Divorced and surpassing Wish and Napoleon. By the middle of its second week, it sold more than 250,000 tickets and by the second weekend it rose to 276,000, ranking second behind Wonka. For its fourth week on the billboard it attracted more than 400,000 viewers. At the end of its run in theaters, the film attracted 611,183 spectators, becoming the twenty-first highest-grossing film in Peru and the third highest-grossing Peruvian film of 2023.
