= Gonzalo Ladines =

Peruvian filmmaker

- Born: 1984 (age 41–42); Lima, Peru
- Occupations: Film director Screenwriter
- Notable work: Los Cinéfilos; Just Like in the Movies; The Last Laugh

Gonzalo Ladines (born 1984, Lima, Peru) is a Peruvian film director, producer and screenwriter. He is best known for co-creating the web series Los Cinéfilos, as well as directing and writing the comedy films Just Like in the Movies (2015) and The Last Laugh (2023).

== Career ==
He graduated from the University of Lima in 2006.

He directed and wrote several short films with a focus on comedy, highlighting Rumeits (2010) and Los niños (2014), and co-wrote the short film Fantastic Cars (2019). Throughout his career he co-wrote several scripts such as Lima 13 (2012), Viejos amigos (2014) and Youtuber Dad (2019), the latter sold to the French (StudioCanal) and Mexican markets (YouthPlanet Films) for remakes.

In 2015, he premiered his first feature film Just Like in the Movies, attracting a total of 227,714 spectators to Peruvian theaters. A year later, it was chosen as the Peruvian entry for Best Ibero-American Film at the 31st Goya Awards, but was not nominated.

In 2023, he premiered his second feature film The Last Laugh in the Made in Peru section of the 27th Lima Film Festival.

== Filmography ==
Year	Title	Director	Writer	Producer	Notes
2006	Un día, una chica	Yes	Yes	No	Short film
2010	Rumeits	Yes	Yes	No	Short film
2012	Lima 13	No	Yes	No	Feature film
2013-2016	Los Cinéfilos	Yes	Yes	Yes	Web series
2014	Los niños	Yes	Yes	No	Short film
2014	Viejos amigos	No	Yes	No	Feature film
2015	Just Like in the Movies	Yes	Yes	No	Feature film
2019	Fantastic Cars	No	Yes	No	Short film
2019	Youtuber Dad	No	Yes	Yes	Feature film
2023	The Last Laugh	Yes	Yes	Yes	Feature film
2024	Viejas amigas	No	No	Yes	Feature film, Executive producer
