= La vida que me robaste =

- Genre: Telenovela
- Created by: Eduardo Adrianzén
- Written by: Abel Enríquez; Juan Pablo Bustamante; Rocío Limo; Bryan Urrunaga
- Directed by: Francisco Álvarez
- Starring: Karina Jordán; Fiorella Díaz; Rodrigo Sánchez Patiño; Nicolás Galindo
- Theme music composer: Juan Carlos Fernández
- Opening theme: "La vida que me robaste" by Brunella Torpoco
- Country of origin: Peru
- Original language: Spanish

Production
- Executive producer: Ivanna de la Piedra
- Producers: Hugo Coya; Adriana Álvarez; Michelle Alexander
- Cinematography: Micaela Cajahuaringa
- Camera setup: Multi-camera
- Production company: Del Barrio Producciones

Original release
- Network: América Televisión
- Release: 8 September 2026 – present

La vida que me robaste is a Peruvian telenovela created by Eduardo Adrianzén. It premiered on América Televisión on 8 September 2026. The series stars Karina Jordán, Fiorella Díaz, Rodrigo Sánchez Patiño and Nicolás Galindo.

== Plot ==
Mariana is a woman who spends ten years in prison after being unjustly convicted. Upon regaining her freedom, she returns home intending to reconnect with her daughters and reclaim the life she left behind. However, during her absence, her daughters have grown up, and her sister Rossy has assumed the role of a maternal figure within the family. Mariana's return disrupts the family dynamic built during the years she was away. While trying to rebuild her relationship with her daughters, she must also confront the consequences of her absence and seek justice for the conviction that landed her in prison.

== Cast ==
- Karina Jordán as Mariana Salazar Aguirre "La Diabla"
- Fiorella Díaz as Rossy Salazar Aguirre de Palacios
- Nicolás Galindo as Diego Miller Echegaray
- Rodrigo Sánchez Patiño as Alfonso "Pocho"
- Milene Vázquez as Helena Franco
- Emilram Cossío as Wolfy
- Claudio Calmet as Aquiles Palacios
- Mayella Lloclla as Camila
- Merly Morello as Melissa Aguirre
  - Briscielo Milton as child Melissa
- Gabriela Billotti as Cristina Estrada
- María Grazia Polanco as Sharon
- Vasco Rodríguez as Hugo
- Nicolás Osorio as Fernando "Nando"
- Rodrigo López Silva as Charlie Beto
- Elisa Costa as Laura
- Rocío Montesinos as Esther
- Julio César Pérez as Bombom
- Valeria Pflücker as Stephany Aguirre
  - Noah Martínez as child Stephany
- Alessia Lambruschini as Mery
- Catalina Marcelo
- Claudio Rubio as Iván
- Rómulo Assereto as Javier Miller Echegaray
- Gabriela Velásquez as Edith Cáceres "La Brava"
- Lilian Schiappa-Pietra as Ramona
- Leslie Stewart as Jacqueline "Jacquie"
- Marcello Rivera as Saúl

== Reception ==
The first episode reached over 1.2 million viewers, achieving an average rating of 19 points, and a 38.4% audience share. With these results, the telenovela led its time slot during its premiere.
