= Los patos y las patas =

- Theatrical release poster
- Directed by: Guillermo Castañeda
- Screenplay by: Gabriel Iglesias
- Based on: Los patos y las patas by Nosequien y Los Nosecuantos
- Starring: Diego Villarán; Francisca Aronsson
- Cinematography: Rubén Carpio
- Production company: Jungle Pictures
- Release date: September 18, 2025
- Running time: 104 minutes
- Country: Peru
- Language: Spanish

Los patos y las patas (lit. 'The ducks and the ducklings') is a 2025 Peruvian jukebox musical romantic comedy film directed by Guillermo Castañeda (in his directorial debut) and written by Gabriel Iglesias. The title comes from the song of the same name, performed by Nosequien y Los Nosecuantos, the film stars Diego Villarán and Francisca Aronsson accompanied by Gian Piero Díaz, Daniela Sarfati, Macla Yamada, Kareem Pizarro, Anaí Padilla, Christian Ysla, Óscar Beltrán, Malú Menacho, Vasco Rodríguez and Emilram Cossio.

== Synopsis ==
In 1993, Tomacito is a shy teenager who arrives with his father at a beach where he meets Romina, a young woman with whom he falls in love. Returning to school also forces him to confront a new school environment, where he finds unexpected support in his teacher Mario Hart, who becomes his emotional guide, encouraging him to express his emotions through music.

== Cast ==
The actors participating in this film are:

- Diego Villarán as Tomacito
- Francisca Aronsson as Romina
- Gian Piero Díaz as Mario Hart
- Daniela Sarfati
- Macla Yamada as Miss Lola
- Kareem Pizarro as Jotache
- Anaí Padilla
- Christian Ysla
- Óscar Beltrán as Tomacito's father
- Malú Menacho
- Vasco Rodríguez
- Emilram Cossio

== Production ==
Principal photography began in late January 2025 and ended on March 7 of the same year in Punta Negra, Lima.

== Release ==
The film premiered on September 18, 2025, in Peruvian theaters.
