= The Last Laugh (2023 film) =

- Theatrical release poster
- Directed by: Gonzalo Ladines
- Written by: Gonzalo Ladines
- Produced by: Enid Campos; Gonzalo Ladines; Gonzalo Carracedo; Karina Jury
- Starring: César Ritter; Gisela Ponce de León
- Cinematography: Fernando Cobian
- Edited by: Chino Pinto
- Music by: Ruiz-Gonzalez
- Production companies: 17 Producciones; Funny Games Films; Todo lo Demás
- Release dates: August 11, 2023 (Lima); January 4, 2024 (Peru)
- Running time: 100 minutes
- Country: Peru
- Language: Spanish

The Last Laugh (Spanish: Muerto de risa, lit. 'Died laughing') is a 2023 Peruvian comedy film written, co-produced and directed by Gonzalo Ladines. The film stars César Ritter and Gisela Ponce de León accompanied by Gianfranco Brero, Giselle Collao, Daniel Menacho, Job Mansilla, Hernán Romero and Gabriela Velásquez. It is about a talk show host who, after the death of his father, loses his sense of humor and seeks to get it back.

== Synopsis ==
Javi Fuentes is the host of the most famous talk show in the country, his humor is based on making fun of others. When his father dies, Javi loses his sense of humor and is replaced by a hateful influencer. To get his show back, Javi decides to hire Alfonsina, a rehabilitated alcoholic who will try to teach him to laugh at himself and not at others.

== Cast ==
- Cesar Ritter as Javi Fuentes
- Gisela Ponce de León as Alfonsina
- Hernán Romero as Javier's dad
- Esteban Recagno as Mario
- Gabriela Velásquez as Esther
- Giselle Collao as Vero
- Gianfranco Brero as Gerardo
- Daniel Menacho as Chucky-Di
- Job Mansilla as Dulfi
- Ricardo Combi as Tommy Chianti
- Renato Pantigozo as Walter

== Production ==
=== Financing ===
At the end of 2018, it won an economic stimulus of 675,000 soles awarded by the Directorate of Audiovisual, Phonography and New Media (DAFO) of the Ministry of Culture of Peru to start production of the film. On February 22, 2022, the director of the film, Gonzalo Ladines, opened a crowdfunding campaign in Joinnus to finish producing his film.

=== Filming ===
Principal photography began on July 1, 2022, in Peru.

== Release ==
The Last Laugh had its world premiere on August 11, 2023, in the Made in Peru section at the 27th Lima Film Festival. Its commercial premiere was scheduled for November 23, 2023, in Peruvian theaters, but was delayed to January 4, 2024.

== Accolades ==
Year	Award / Festival	Category	Recipient	Result	Ref.
2023	27th Lima Film Festival	Made in Peru - Audience Award	The Last Laugh	Nominated	
2024	15th APRECI Awards	Best Actor	César Ritter	Nominated	
2024	15th APRECI Awards	Best Supporting Actor	Gianfranco Brero	Nominated	
2024	15th APRECI Awards	Best Screenplay	Gonzalo Ladines	Nominated	
2024	11th Huánuco Film Festival	Best Feature Film in Fiction Premiere	The Last Laugh	Nominated	
