= Princesas (TV series) =

Peruvian telenovela

- Genre: Telenovela
- Created by: Miguel Zuloaga
- Written by: Augusto Cabada; Guillermo Aranda; Cinthia McKenzie; José Luis Varela; Juan Armesto; Sebastián Gordillo; Gerardo Ruiz
- Directed by: Luis Barrios; Miluska Rosas
- Creative directors: Mariana Ramírez del Villar; Diana Solís
- Starring: Fiorella Pennano; Tatiana Calmell; Priscila Espinoza; Flavia Laos; Francisco Andrade; Mauricio Abad; Juan Ignacio Di Marco; Stefano Salvini
- Theme music composer: Nicole Pillman; Santiago León Falcón
- Opening theme: "Princesas" by Nicole Pillman
- Composer: Jesús Levano
- Country of origin: Peru
- Original language: Spanish
- No. of seasons: 1
- No. of episodes: 61

Production
- Executive producers: Cecilia Rodríguez; Nataly Mendoza
- Producers: Miguel Zuloaga; Mariana Ramírez del Villar
- Camera setup: Multi-camera
- Production company: ProTV Producciones

Original release
- Network: América Televisión
- Release: 1 December 2020 – 26 February 2021

Princesas is a Peruvian telenovela created by Miguel Zuloaga. It aired on América Televisión from 1 December 2020 to 26 February 2021. The telenovela is a contemporary adaptation of the stories of four fairy tale princesses: Snow White, Belle, Cinderella and Rapunzel; as well as several other characters from other fairy tales or fantasy stories. It stars Fiorella Pennano, Tatiana Calmell, Priscila Espinoza, Flavia Laos, Francisco Andrade, Mauricio Abad, Juan Ignacio Di Marco and Stefano Salvini.

A sequel series titled Brujas was released on Vix on 4 January 2025.

== Plot ==
The telenovela follows four young women, each very different and unique in their own way, but whose lives are intertwined in one way or another. They have different families and problems, but they all share a single goal: happiness. After her father's death, Blanca is left with the presidential advisor, her stepmother Regina Ortega, who married her father after the strange death of her mother when Blanca was just a child. Driven by greed, Regina will make Blanca's life a living hell. Bella is the daughter of the President of Peru, who, after rejecting her boyfriend's marriage proposal and almost being abused, falls in love with Aaron, a man with a sad past. Danielle is mistreated by her stepmother and two stepsisters. One day, after being framed for theft by one of them, she meets Felipe, the son of the Mayor of Lima, a handsome young man who quickly falls in love with her. Rapunzel is Felipe's adopted sister, who suffers from an illness that has confined her to a wheelchair and left her with little time to live. She is in search of her biological family and wants to win the heart of the love of her life, Arturo, the President's son and Bella's brother.

== Cast ==
- Fiorella Pennano as Blanca del Bosque Rubinni (based on Snow White)
- Francisco Andrade as Sebastián Aramburú (based on The Prince from Snow White)
- Flavia Laos as Bella Villarreal Castilla (based on Beauty)
- Stefano Salvini as Aarón Ortiz de Guzmán y Lazareno "La Bestia" (based on the Beast from Beauty and the Beast)
- Priscila Espinoza as Violeta Coronado / Rapunzel La Torre Ramírez (based on Rapunzel)
- Juan Ignacio Di Marco as Arturo Villarreal Castilla (based on the Prince from Rapunzel)
- Tatiana Calmell as Danielle Coronado (based on Cinderella)
- Mauricio Abad as Felipe La Torre Ramírez (based on Prince Charming from Cinderella)
- Alessa Esparza as Victoria "Vicky" Tucci (based on Little Red Riding Hood)
- Ana Cecilia Natteri as Elvira Hurtado (based on Dame Gothel from Rapunzel)
- Andrea Luna as Zamara Machuca Espinoza (based on one of the stepsisters from Cinderella)
- César Ritter as Tony Guerrero (based on Hansel and Gretel's father)
- Claret Quea as Virus (based on one of the seven dwarfs from Snow White)
- Eduardo Pinillos as Tanque (based on one of the seven dwarfs from Snow White)
- Francisco Donovan as Marlon Carbajal M. (based on the huntsman from Snow White)
- Giuliana Muente as Úrsula Rosario Machuca Espinoza (based on one of the stepsisters from Cinderella)
- Guillermo Castañeda as Benito Corchuelo Zapata «Chuncho» (based on one of the seven dwarfs from Snow White)
- Javier Delgiudice as Gaspar Villarreal (based on the King from Beauty and the Beast)
- Jimena Lindo as Fiorella Espinoza Troncoso (based on Hansel and Gretel's mother)
- Karina Jordán as Regina Ortega Vda. de Del Bosque (based on the Evil Queen from Snow White)
  - Jordán also appears as the reflection on the mirror (based on the Magic Mirror from Snow White)
- Leslie Stewart as Diana Ramírez Picilli de La Torre (based on the Queen from Cinderella and Rapunzel)
- Germán «Manchi» Ramírez as Jefferson López "Gringo" (based on one of the seven dwarfs from Snow White)
- Monserrat Brugué as Ada Coronado (based on the Fairy Godmother from Cinderella)
- Norma Martínez as Josefina Castilla de Villarreal (based on the Queen from Beauty and the Beast)
- Omar Milla as Goliat (based on one of the seven dwarfs from Snow White)
- Pablo Saldarriaga as Damián Hurtado (based on one of the seven dwarfs from Snow White)
- Patricia Portocarrero as Maldina Perpetua Espinoza Troncoso (based on the Stepmother from Cinderella)
- Sebastián Stimman as José Luis Campodónico
- Sergio Galliani as Carlos La Torre Mendoza (based on the Big Bad Wolf from Little Red Riding Hood and King from Rapunzel)
- Uma Mikati as Gretel Guerrero Espinoza (based on Gretel from Hansel and Gretel)
- Walter Ramírez as Pistolas (based on one of the seven dwarfs from Snow White)
- Paul Vega as Luciano Díaz
- Saskia Bernaola as Federica Zorrilla Acosta (based on the Fox from The Adventures of Pinocchio)
- Kathy Serrano as Grimalda (based on the Queen of Hearts from Alice's Adventures in Wonderland)

== Reception ==
The telenovela premiered on 1 December 2020, becoming the most watched program in its timeslot with a percentage rating of 23.3 points. It ended on 26 February 2021 with a percentage rating of 23.6 points, becoming the most watched program in its timeslot.
