= Věž =

- Municipality
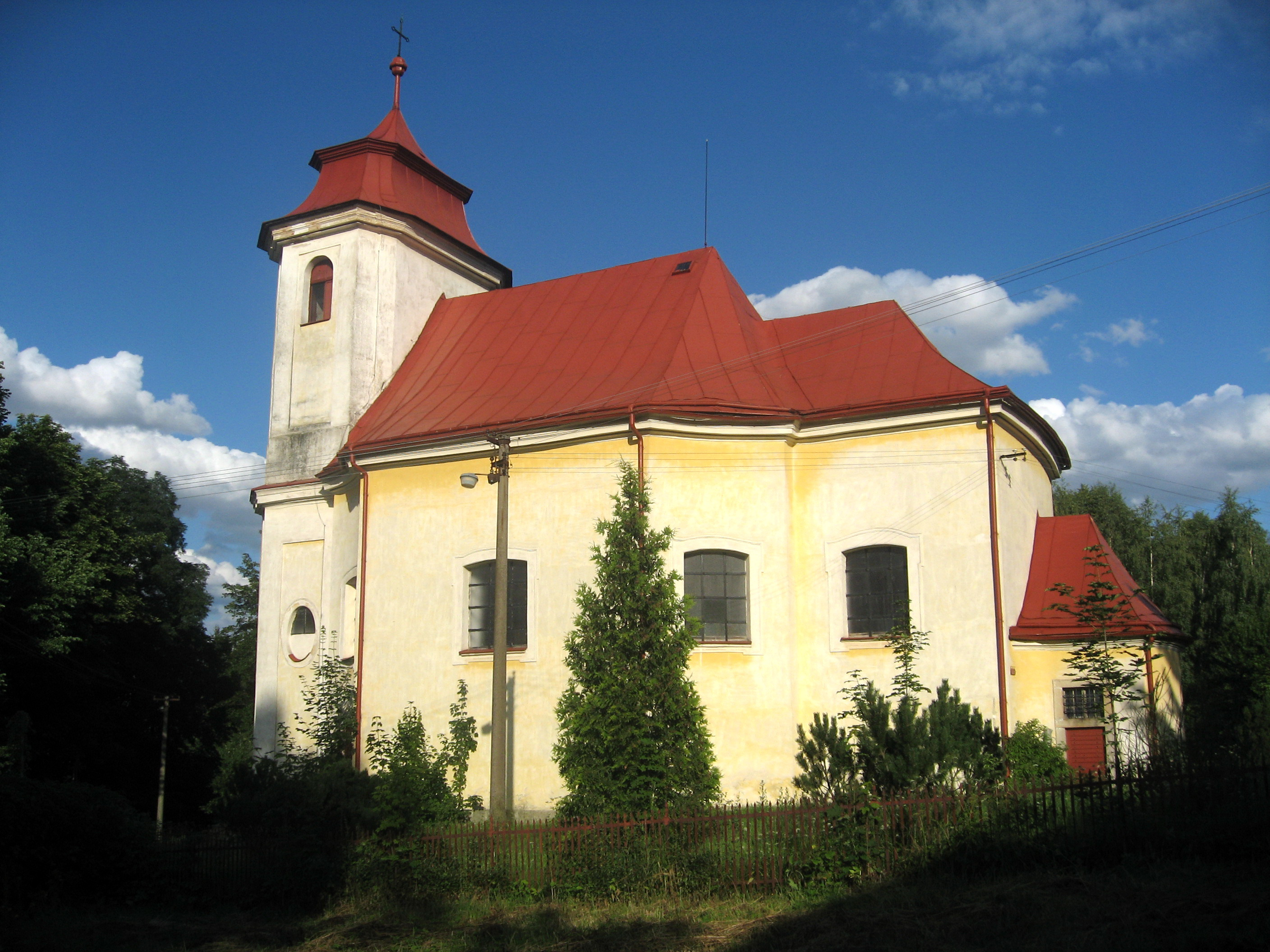
- Church of the Assumption of the Virgin Mary

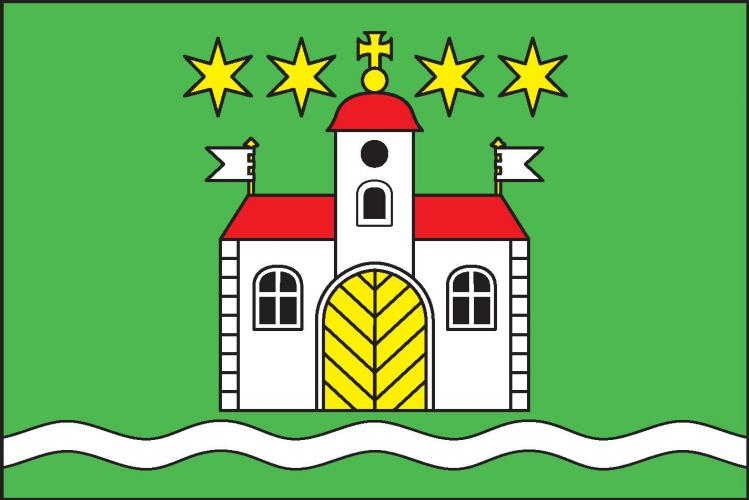
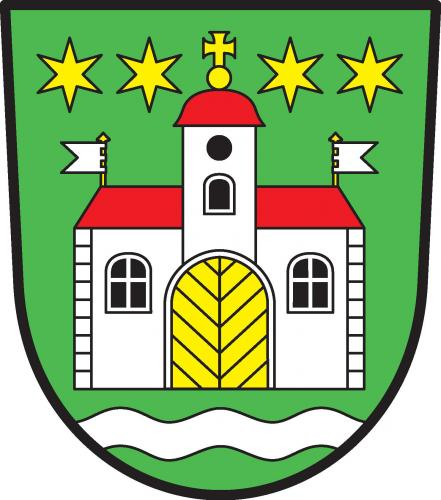
- Flag Coat of arms

- Location in the Czech Republic
- Coordinates: 49°33′50″N 15°27′33″E
- Country: Czech Republic
- Region: Vysočina
- District: Havlíčkův Brod
- First mentioned: 1404

Area
  - Total: 14.44 km^{2} (5.58 sq mi)
- Elevation: 538 m (1,765 ft)

Population (2026-01-01)
  - Total: 832
  - Density: 57.6/km^{2} (149/sq mi)
- Time zone: UTC+1 (CET)
  - Summer (DST): UTC+2 (CEST)
- Postal codes: 580 01, 582 56
- Website: www.obecvez.cz

Věž is a municipality and village in Havlíčkův Brod District in the Vysočina Region of the Czech Republic. It has about 800 inhabitants.

Věž lies approximately 10 kilometres (6 mi) south-west of Havlíčkův Brod, 21 km (13 mi) north-west of Jihlava, and 95 km (59 mi) south-east of Prague.

== Administrative division ==
Věž consists of five municipal parts (in brackets population according to the 2021 census):

- Věž (572)
- Jedouchov (34)
- Leština (99)
- Mozerov (6)
- Skála (99)

== Demographics ==
Historical population
Year	Pop.	±%
1869	1,387	—
1880	1,374	−0.9%
1890	1,365	−0.7%
1900	1,288	−5.6%
1910	1,224	−5.0%
1921	1,184	−3.3%
1930	1,076	−9.1%
1950	861	−20.0%
1961	936	+8.7%
1970	905	−3.3%
1980	823	−9.1%
1991	738	−10.3%
2001	746	+1.1%
2011	814	+9.1%
2021	810	−0.5%
Source: Censuses
