= Anel Townsend =

Peruvian politician

Ana Elena Townsend Diez Canseco is a Peruvian politician and former member of the Peruvian Congress. She is the daughter of Andrés Townsend, who was formerly the Speaker of the Peruvian Chamber of Deputies, and prominent Senator who founded the Latin American Parliament in 1964.

== Professional career ==
Townsend was elected to Congress in 1995 as a guest member on the candidate list presented by Ambassador Javier Pérez de Cuéllar. Townsend was again reelected in 2000 and in 2001. In 2001, as part of Alejandro Toledo´s political party she obtained the highest vote count of all elected representatives. In total, she served in the Peruvian legislature from 1995 to 2006.

In 2003 President Alejandro Toledo nominated her as Minister of Women's Affairs and Social Development.

== Legislative work ==
Her legislative work focused on human rights, anticorruption, transparency, and gender issues. Further, she chaired a committee charged with investigating the corruption of Alberto Fujimori´s Presidency. Notably, she was the author of the first Law of Access to Information in Peru.

== Present activities ==
Currently, Townsend is a member of a number of issues-based multi-national organizations. She is involved with the Advisory Council of the Latin American Parliament, which gathers 22 legislative bodies from Latin America and the Caribbean and also participates in the Advisory Council of Vital Voices for a Global Partnership in Washington DC which is a non profit organization chaired by Senator Hillary Clinton and Kay Bailey Hutchison that promotes female involvement in global leadership. Additionally, she works as an international consultant in governance, gender, and anticorruption matters in Washington DC, USA.

Anel Townsend has authored three books: In the Name of Law, a compilation of her parliamentarian speeches; The Strengthening of Political Parties in Latin America; and lastly, For a World Without Poverty and Inequality: The role of the Latin American Parliamentarians in the implementation of Millennium Development Goals.
