= Somos (Christopher Von Uckermann album) =

Studio album by Christopher Von Uckermann
- Released: 16 November 2010
- Recorded: 2009–2010
- Genre: Latin pop, dance-pop
- Length: 44:02
- Label: PeerT6H Music
- Producer: George Noriega

Christopher Von Uckermann chronology
Somos (2010)	La Revolución de los Ciegos (2019)

Singles from Somos
- 1. "Vivir Soñando" Released: 13 April 2010; 2. "Sinfonía" Released: 22 September 2010

Somos (We Are) is the debut studio album by Christopher Von Uckermann. It was released on November 16, 2010.

"Somos" is an innovative album, where each of the pieces are fused, conceptual and futuristic electronica are fed with fresh lyrics undoubtedly mark the history of experimental pop as defined by the young Mexican.

The album promoted "Somos World Tour 2011" in August 2011.

== Singles ==
"Sinfonía" is the first single, and became the letter of the album. The song was written with Jodi Marr, Rob Wells and George Noriega (Shakira, Ricky Martin, Robi Draco, Gloria Estefan) who were in charge of recording and production, taking care to make real what Christopher wanted, to have ideas for their first child musical.

== Track listing ==
All songs were co-written by Christopher von Uckermann.

1. "Mundo Irreal" – 4:06
2. "Situación Perfecta" – 3:44 (Roman X/Dan Vikta/Uckermann)
3. "Hacia el Sol" – 3:52 (Klaus Derendorf/Ximena Muñoz/Uckermann)
4. "Apaga la Máquina" – 3:57 (Klaus Derendorf/Claudia Brant/Uckermann)
5. "1,2,3" – 3:38 (Tiago D'Errico/Uckermann)
6. "Sinfonía" – 3:56 (Jodi Marr/George Noriega/Rob Wells/Uckermann)
7. "Someday" – 2:50
8. "Somos" – 4:20
9. "Tal Vez" – 2:51
10. "Mente Mayor" – 2:52
11. "Vivir Soñando" – 3:57
12. "Imaginación" – 4:16 (Roman X/Vikta/Uckermann)

== Charts ==
Chart (2010)	Peak position
U.S. Latin Pop Albums	14
U.S. Latin Albums	72
