= How to Get Over a Breakup =

2018 Peruvian comedy film

- Theatrical release poster
- Spanish: Soltera Codiciada
- Directed by: Bruno Ascenzo; Joanna Lombardi
- Written by: María José Osorio
- Starring: Gisela Ponce de León; Karina Jordán; Jely Reátegui
- Production company: Tondero Producciones
- Distributed by: Netflix
- Release date: May 31, 2018
- Running time: 104 minutes
- Country: Peru
- Language: Spanish

How to Get Over a Breakup (Spanish: Soltera Codiciada, lit. 'Coveted single') is a 2018 Peruvian comedy film directed by Bruno Ascenzo and Joanna Lombardi and written by Samuel Stewart Hunter and María José Osorio.

== Plot ==
The film is about a copywriter, Maria Fe (Gisela Ponce de León), who is suddenly dumped. As a way of getting over the breakup, she starts a blog about how to do it.

== Cast ==
- Gisela Ponce de León as María Fé
- Karina Jordán as Natalia
- Jely Reátegui as Carolina
- Christopher von Uckermann as Santiago
- Andrés Salas as Matías
- Carlos Carlín as Ramiro
- Mario Saldaña as Diego
- Anai Padilla as Fio
- Nicolás Galindo as Charly
- Guillermo Castañeda as Minimi
- Yaco Eskenazi as Andrés
- César Ritter as Lorenzo
- Rodrigo Palacios as Jaime

== Sequel ==
At the end of 2021, the creator of the story, María José Osorio, came up with the idea of developing a sequel under the title of How to Deal With a Heartbreak which ended up being consolidated at the end of the same year under the production company El Árbol Azul. It premiered on July 6, 2023 in Peruvian theaters.

== Remake ==
At the end of March 2021, the rights to the film's script were purchased from the French company StudioCanal in order to make a French remake.
