= The Solar System (film) =

El sistema solar
- Film poster
- Directed by: Bacha Caravedo; Chinón Higashionna
- Written by: Bacha Caravedo
- Based on: El sistema solar by Mariana de Althaus
- Produced by: Ricard Domingo; Anna Soler-Pont; Lorena Ugarteche
- Starring: Leonor Watling; Gisela Ponce de León; Cesar Ritter; Adriana Ugarte; Javier Valdés; Sebastián Zamudio
- Cinematography: Andrés Mazzon
- Edited by: Chino Pinto
- Music by: Chick Aguirre
- Production companies: Señor Z Pontas Films
- Release dates: November 3, 2017 (Spain); November 16, 2017 (Peru)
- Running time: 89 minutes
- Countries: Peru; Spain
- Language: Spanish

The Solar System (Spanish: El sistema solar) is a 2017 comedy-drama film directed by Bacha Caravedo & Chinón Higashionna and written by Caravedo. It is based on the homonymous play by Mariana de Althaus. The film stars Leonor Watling, Gisela Ponce de León, Cesar Ritter, Adriana Ugarte, Javier Valdés and Sebastián Zamudio.

== Synopsis ==
Christmas night at the Del Solar family's house becomes a reunion full of reproaches, extreme tensions, surprising revelations and, perhaps, a reconciliation. Leonardo, the patriarch, arrives sick along with his son Pavel's ex-girlfriend, for whom he left his wife.

== Cast ==
The actors participating in this film are:

- Adriana Ugarte as Agnes
- Leonor Watling as Inés
- Gisela Ponce de León as Edurne
- Cesar Ritter as Pavel del Solar
- Sebastian Zamudio as Puli
- Javier Valdes as Leonardo del Solar

== Release ==
The film opened on November 3, 2017, in Spanish theaters, while in Peru it was released on the 16th of the same month.

== See also ==
- List of Christmas films
