= Margarita (2016 film) =

- Theatrical release poster
- Directed by: Frank Pérez-Garland
- Written by: Vanessa Saba
- Produced by: Gustavo Sánchez
- Starring: Francisca Aronsson; Giovanni Ciccia; Melania Urbina
- Cinematography: Roberto Maceda Kohatsu
- Edited by: Angela Vera Temoche
- Music by: Jorge Alayo; Rafo Arbulu; Jose Manuel Barrios; Pamela Llosa; Karin Zielinski
- Production companies: Elefante Miope; La Soga Producciones
- Release date: September 8, 2016
- Running time: 94 minutes
- Country: Peru
- Language: Spanish

Margarita (also known as: Margarita: ese dulce caos, lit. 'Margarita: that sweet chaos') is a 2016 Peruvian comedy film directed by Frank Pérez-Garland and written by Vanessa Saba. Starring Giovanni Ciccia, Francisca Aronsson, Melania Urbina, Cesar Ritter, Vanessa Saba, Maria Grazia Gamarra and Yvonne Frayssinet, the film was released on September 8, 2016.

== Synopsis ==
A forty-year-old divorced father lives a relaxed life until one day his 11-year-old daughter knocks on his door to stay. His life takes a 180 degree turn because Margarita is a sweet chaos that he did not expect.

== Cast ==
The actors participating in this film are:

- Francisca Aronsson as Margarita
- Giovanni Ciccia as Rafo
- Melania Urbina as Claudia
- Vanessa Saba as Sandra
- César Ritter as Charlie
- Maria Grazia Gamarra as Thalia
- Yvonne Frayssinet as Rebeca

== Reception ==
In its first 2 days in theaters, the film drew 15.263 viewers. It subsequently drew 117,000 viewers by the end of its first week. At the end of the year, the film attracted a total of 550,279 viewers, becoming the fourth highest-grossing Peruvian film of 2016.
