= Viejas amigas =

- Theatrical release poster
- Directed by: Fernando Villarán
- Written by: Marco Moscoso; Fernando Villaran
- Produced by: Marco Moscoso; Fernando Villaran Lujan
- Starring: Ana Cecilia Natteri; Haydee Cáceres; Milena Alva; Patricia Frayssinet
- Cinematography: Micaela Cajahuaringa
- Edited by: Javier Becerra Heraud
- Music by: Gonzalo Polar
- Production companies: Funny Games Films; Mama Okllo Films
- Distributed by: Cinecolor
- Release date: May 23, 2024
- Running time: 100 minutes
- Country: Peru
- Language: Spanish

Viejas amigas (lit. 'Old friends') is a 2024 Peruvian comedy film co-written, co-produced and directed by Fernando Villarán. It is a female spin-off of the film Viejos amigos (2014). It stars Ana Cecilia Natteri, Haydee Cáceres, Milena Alva and Patricia Frayssinet.

== Synopsis ==
Pilar, Charito, Meche and Cristina are four very good friends who love timba and lonchecito who meet every weekend. When they discover that one of them is facing a battle with cancer, they decide to carry out a rescue plan, determined to prevent the disease from taking her away.

== Cast ==
- Ana Cecilia Natteri as Pilar
- Haydee Cáceres as Meche
- Milena Alva as Cristina
- Patricia Frayssinet as Charito
- Brigitte Jouannet as Ladies' accomplice
- Jely Reátegui
- Eduardo Camino
- Gianfranco Berro
- Aysha Gómez

== Production ==
Principal photography was scheduled to begin in 2020, but was canceled due to the COVID-19 pandemic. Finally, filming began in September 2022.

== Release ==
Viejas amigas was scheduled to be released on May 1, 2024, in Peruvian theaters, but it was delayed until May 23, 2023.
