= Viejos amigos =

- Theatrical release poster
- Directed by: Fernando Villarán Luján
- Written by: Fernando Villarán Luján; Gonzalo Ladines
- Starring: Ricardo Blume; Carlos Gassols; Enrique Victoria; Teddy Guzmán
- Cinematography: Fergan Chávez Ferrer
- Edited by: Roberto Benavides
- Music by: Fernando Urquiaga
- Production company: Mama Okllo Films
- Distributed by: New Century Films
- Release date: August 14, 2014
- Running time: 93 minutes
- Country: Peru
- Language: Spanish

Viejos amigos (lit. 'Old friends'), sometimes known in English as Good Old Boys, is a 2014 Peruvian comedy film directed by Fernando Villarán Luján (in his directorial debut) and written by Villarán and Gonzalo Ladines. It stars Ricardo Blume, Carlos Gassols, and Enrique Victoria, and antagonizes Teddy Guzmán.

== Plot ==
Three elderly friends, Balito, Domingo and Villarán, meet for the funeral of their mutual friend, Kike. There, they remember that he wanted his ashes to be scattered in the sea near Callao, his hometown. At the same funeral, Balito steals Kike's ashes, an action that triggers a trip in which the three remember all kinds of anecdotes while fleeing from Kike's widow, Victoria. During their adventure, the interest of the three of them for the local soccer team, Sport Boys Association, becomes very important, which makes them relate to a group of three young people who are also fans of the club. In said journey through the past in the present, their old friendship will be renewed.

== Cast ==
- Ricardo Blume is Balito.
- Carlos Gassols is Sunday.
- Enrique Victoria Fernández is Villarán.
- Teddy Guzmán is Victoria.
- César Ritter as the priest.
- Carlos Montalvo, Emanuel Soriano and Ricardo Mendoza are the fans of the Sport Boys Association.
- Lorena Caravedo as Rosita, Domingo's daughter.
- Mayra Couto

== Reception ==
=== Box office ===
The film in its opening weekend, drew 85,211 viewers to the theater. After 11 weeks in theaters, the film attracted 470,000 and grossed US$1,695,006, becoming the third highest grossing Peruvian film of 2014.

=== Accolades ===
The film project was awarded in 2011 at Conacine - Extraordinary Contest for Peruvian Feature Film Projects.

It was nominated for best film at the 18th Lima Film Festival, in which it won the Titra award for the Peruvian film most voted by the public.

In 2014, the film, the director and the leading actors were awarded by the Ministry of Women and Vulnerable Populations.

== Spin-off ==
In 2022, a female spin-off feature film titled Viejas amigas was filmed, starring Ana Cecilia Natteri, Haydee Cáceres, Milena Alva and Patricia Frayssinet. It premiered on May 23, 2024 in Peruvian theaters.
