= El Candidato (2016 film) =

- Theatrical release poster
- Directed by: Alvaro Velarde
- Written by: Alvaro Velarde
- Produced by: Jesus Alvarez Betancourt; Daniel Rehder
- Starring: Manolo Rojas; Hernán Vidaurre; Guillermo Rossini; Giovanna Castro
- Cinematography: Alvaro Velarde
- Edited by: Mauricio Rivera Hoffmann
- Production companies: Alvaro Velarde Producciones; Faeton Producciones; Rehder Films
- Release date: July 21, 2016
- Running time: 80 minutes
- Country: Peru
- Language: Spanish

El Candidato (lit. 'The candidate') is a 2016 Peruvian political satire comedy film written and directed by Alvaro Velarde. Starring Manolo Rojas, Hernán Vidaurre and Guillermo Rossini. The film premiered on July 21, 2016, in Peruvian theaters. It won at the Figueira Film Art de Portugal Film Festival in the category of Best Screenplay.

== Synopsis ==
The story of four politicians who want to reach the presidential seat and their strategies to increase their popularity, along with the influence of their families and campaign teams.

== Cast ==
The actors participating in this film are:

- Manolo Rojas as Napoleón Cordoba
- Hernán Vidaurre as Ego Pereira
- Guillermo Rossini as Mr. Huapaya
- Giovanna Castro as Ego's Advisor
- Alberick Garcia Cerna as Amaru Huapaya
- Bernie Paz as Mickey
- César Ritter as Honorato Contreras
- David Villanueva as Spanish Advisor

== Production ==
The filming was divided into 2 parts, the first stage began on December 13, 2015, and ended on the 23rd of the same month. The second stage began in mid-January.
