= Francisca Aronsson =

Swedish-Peruvian actress

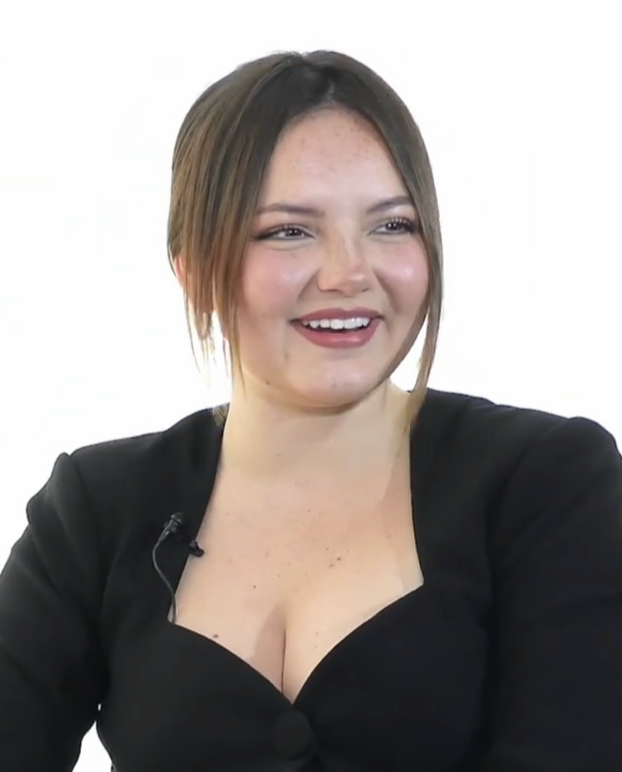
- Aronsson in 2025
- Born: Francisca Anette Aronsson Grande; 12 June 2006 (age 19); Gothenburg, Sweden
- Occupations: Actress; social media personality
- Notable work: Margarita

Francisca Anette Aronsson Grande (born 12 June 2006) is a Swedish-Peruvian actress and social media personality. She is known for her leading role in the film Margarita (2016) and her participation in series and television programs such as Al fondo hay sitio, Ven, baila, Quinceañera and in the role of Rita, in El internado: Las Cumbres.

== Life ==
She moved with her family to Peru in 2014. After work in the theater, she participated in the television talent show, El gran show, hosted by Gisela Valcárcel.

In 2016, Aronsson appeared in the main role of the film Margarita and its sequel Margarita 2, directed by Frank Pérez-Garland. She appeared in El Gran Criollo (2017), Paradise Hotel (2019). She appeared in series such as Al fondo hay sitio (2015–2016), Ven, baila, Quinceañera (2015–2018) and Te volveré a encontrar (2020). As of 2021 she plays the role of Rita in the Spanish series El internado: Las Cumbres.

In 2020, she was appointed a UNICEF ambassador, advocating for the rights of girls and adolescents. She was interviewed on Día D. She also appears in the Amazon Prime television series, Lalola, as Sol, the daughter of an absent but present father.

In 2025, she co-starred in the musical comedy film Los patos y las patas directed by Guillermo Castañeda.

== Family ==
Her uncle is Erik Bolin and her aunt is Christian Serratos.
