= Teatro La Plaza =

Theatre in Peru

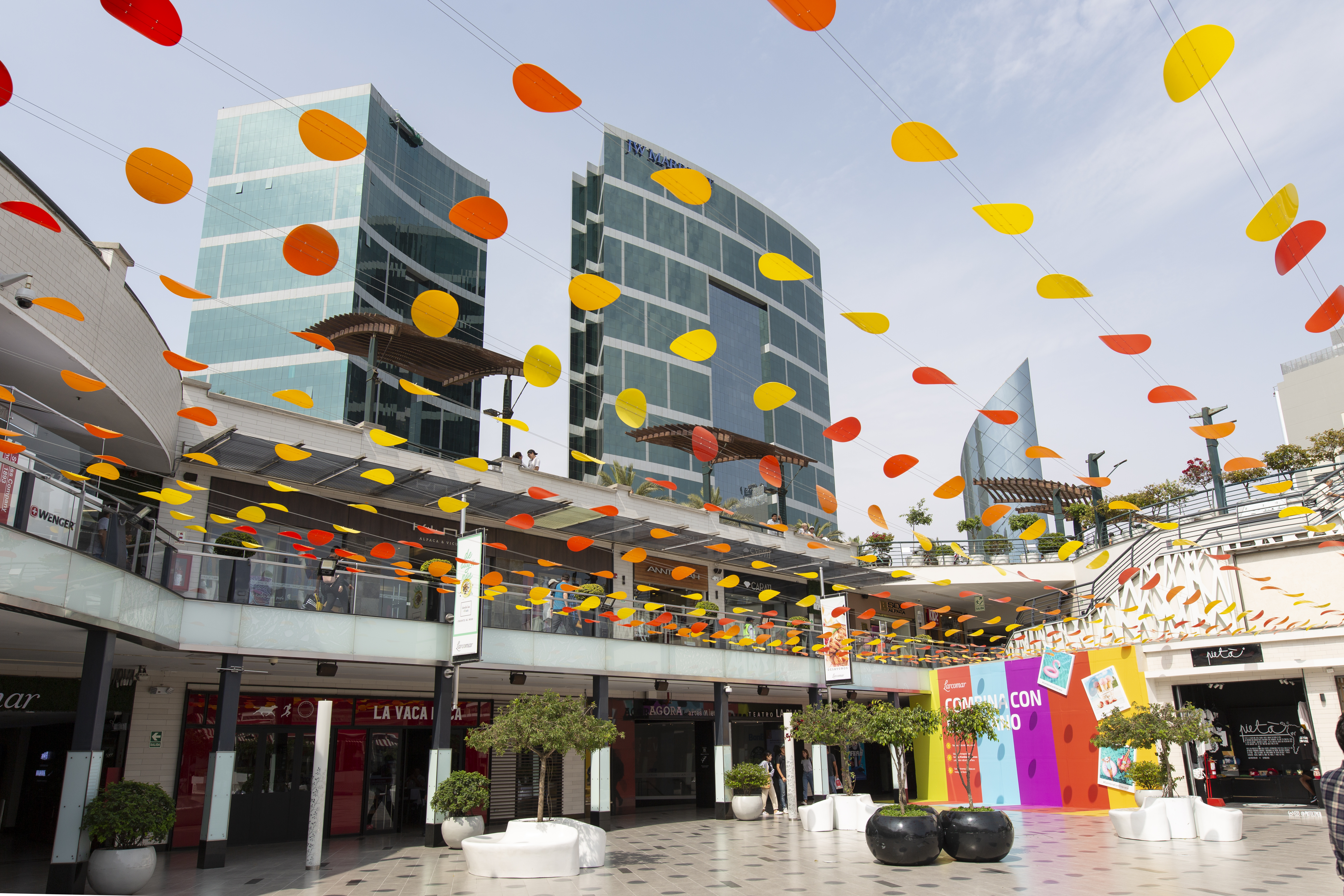
- Entrance (bottom centre) at Larcomar
- Location: Larcomar, Lima, Peru

Construction
- Opened: 23 October 2003

Website
- laplaza.com.pe

Teatro La Plaza, also known as La Plaza ISIL, is a theatre located at Larcomar shopping centre, in Miraflores District, Lima, Peru.

== History ==
It opened its doors on October 23, 2003, with Mary Zimmerman's play Metamorphoses, directed by Chela de Ferrari. at the initiative of a group of artists supported by the San Ignacio de Loyola institute.

Since its opening, it has carried out programmes to help guide aspiring artists into a professional career.

== See also ==
- Larcomar
