= List of romantic comedy films =

This is a list of romantic comedy films, ordered by year of release.

== 1912–1949 ==
Year	Title	Director	Country	Genre/notes
1912	All for a Girl	Frederick A. Thomson	United States	Short
1914	Mabel's Strange Predicament	Mabel Normand	United States	Short - A noisy, drunk, flirtatious tramp comes between Mabel and her lover Harry. The first film of Charles Chaplin appearing as The Tramp, - Keystone Film Company
1914	Tillie's Punctured Romance	Mack Sennett	United States	First comedy feature film—subgenre: slapstick, with Marie Dressler in the title role - Keystone Film Company
1918	Mickey	F. Richard Jones	United States	First romantic comedy feature film, shot between May, 1916 and April, 1917 - Mabel Normand Feature Film Company; released August 11, 1918 - W.H. Productions - with Mabel Normand in the title role as she grows from a mischievous, orphaned teenage girl into a mature young woman, battling family deceptions, misunderstandings, and attempted rape, finally to marry her dedicated true lover, a handsome young mining engineer, played by Wheeler Oakman. The film became an instant hit all over the world, with lines stretching for blocks. It was the highest grossing motion picture in the world in 1918, grossing $18 million over a 4-year period, when admission prices were between about 25¢ and $1. Adjusting for inflation, in 2024 dollars, it grossed $372,316,291 over four years. Adjusting for the four-fold increase in world population today, in 2024 it would have brought in a potential box office gross over a 4-year period of $1,489,265,164. Adjusting for the fact that 1918-1922 were the years of the world pandemic of Spanish flu and were the years following World War I, it impossible to calculate the incredible success Mickey would have achieved in a healthier more peaceful world.
1919	The Doll	Ernst Lubitsch	Germany	
1920	Erotikon	Mauritz Stiller	Sweden	
1921	The Wildcat	Ernst Lubitsch	Germany	
1924	Girl Shy	Fred C. Newmeyer Sam Taylor	United States	
1927	Ten Modern Commandments	Dorothy Arzner	United States	
1930	Holiday	Edward H. Griffith	United States	
1931	City Lights	Charlie Chaplin	United States	
1932	Trouble in Paradise	Ernst Lubitsch	United States	
1933	One Sunday Afternoon	Stephen Roberts	United States	
1934	It Happened One Night	Frank Capra	United States	Screwball comedy
1936	Libeled Lady	Jack Conway	United States	Screwball comedy
1936	My Man Godfrey	Gregory La Cava	United States	Screwball comedy
1937	The Awful Truth	Leo McCarey	United States	Screwball comedy
1937	Easy Living	Mitchell Leisen	United States	
1938	Bringing Up Baby	Howard Hawks	United States	Screwball comedy
1938	Holiday	George Cukor	United States	
1938	The Mad Miss Manton	Leigh Jason	United States	Screwball comedy
1939	Ninotchka	Ernst Lubitsch	United States	
1939	Bachelor Mother	Garson Kanin	United States	Screwball comedy
1940	The Philadelphia Story	George Cukor	United States	Screwball comedy
1940	I Love You Again	W.S. Van Dyke	United States	Screwball comedy
1940	The Shop Around the Corner	Ernst Lubitsch	United States	
1941	Ball of Fire	Howard Hawks	United States	Screwball comedy
1941	Here Comes Mr. Jordan	Alexander Hall	United States	Fantasy
1941	The Lady Eve	Preston Sturges	United States	Screwball comedy
1941	The Strawberry Blonde	Raoul Walsh	United States	
1942	Woman of the Year	George Stevens	United States	Sport
1944	Cover Girl	Charles Vidor	United States	Musical
1945	Christmas in Connecticut	Peter Godfrey	United States	
1946	Cluny Brown	Ernst Lubitsch	United States	
1947	The Bishop's Wife	Henry Koster	United States	Fantasy
1947	Down to Earth	Alexander Hall	United States	Fantasy
1948	A Song Is Born	Howard Hawks	United States	Musical
1949	Adam's Rib	George Cukor	United States	

== 1950–1969 ==
Year	Title	Director	Country	Genre/notes
1950	Born Yesterday	George Cukor	United States	
1952	Pat and Mike	George Cukor	United States	
1952	The Quiet Man	John Ford	United States	
1952	Singin' in the Rain	Gene Kelly and Stanley Donen	United States	Musical
1953	Gentlemen Prefer Blondes	Howard Hawks	United States	Musical comedy
1953	How to Marry a Millionaire	Jean Negulesco	United States	
1953	Roman Holiday	William Wyler	United States	
1954	Sabrina	Billy Wilder	United States	
1955	The Seven Year Itch	Billy Wilder	United States	
1956	High Society	Charles Walters	United States	
1957	Desk Set	Walter Lang	United States	
1957	Love in the Afternoon	Billy Wilder	United States	
1957	My Man Godfrey	Henry Koster	United States	
1958	Bell, Book and Candle	Richard Quine	United States	Fantasy
1958	Houseboat	Melville Shavelson	United States	
1958	Indiscreet	Stanley Donen	United Kingdom	
1959	Pillow Talk	Michael Gordon	United States	
1959	Some Like It Hot	Billy Wilder	United States	
1960	The Apartment	Billy Wilder	United States	
1960	Doctor in Love	Ralph Thomas	United Kingdom	
1961	Breakfast at Tiffany's	Blake Edwards	United States	
1962	That Touch of Mink	Delbert Mann	United States	
1963	Irma la Douce	Billy Wilder	United States	
1963	The V.I.P.s	Anthony Asquith	United Kingdom	
1964	Father Goose	Ralph Nelson	United States	
1967	Barefoot in the Park	Gene Saks	United States	Screwball
1967	The Graduate	Mike Nichols	United States	
1967	Guess Who's Coming to Dinner	Stanley Kramer	United States	
1967	Two for the Road	Stanley Donen	United Kingdom; United States	
1968	Sweet November	Robert Ellis Miller	United States	
1969	Paint Your Wagon	Joshua Logan	United States	

== 1970–1989 ==
Year	Title	Director	Country	Genre/notes
1970	The Owl and the Pussycat	Herbert Ross	United States	
1970	There's a Girl in My Soup	Roy Boulting	United Kingdom	
1971	Harold and Maude	Hal Ashby	United States	
1971	Minnie and Moskowitz	John Cassavetes	United States	
1972	Butterflies Are Free	Milton Katselas	United States	
1972	The Heartbreak Kid	Elaine May	United States	
1972	Play It Again, Sam	Herbert Ross	United States	
1972	What's Up, Doc?	Peter Bogdanovich	United States	
1973	Blume in Love	Paul Mazursky	United States	
1973	A Touch of Class	Melvin Frank	United Kingdom	
1974	Claudine	John Berry	United States	
1974	Alice Doesn't Live Here Anymore	Martin Scorsese	United States	
1977	Annie Hall	Woody Allen	United States	
1977	The Goodbye Girl	Herbert Ross	United States	
1978	Grease	Randal Kleiser	United States	
1978	Same Time, Next Year	Robert Mulligan	United States	
1978	An Unmarried Woman	Paul Mazursky	United States	
1979	10	Blake Edwards	United States	
1979	Chapter Two	Robert Moore	United States	
1979	A Little Romance	George Roy Hill	United States	
1979	Lost and Found	Melvin Frank	United Kingdom	
1979	The Main Event	Howard Zieff	United States	
1979	Manhattan	Woody Allen	United States	
1979	Starting Over	Alan J. Pakula	United States	
1980	It's My Turn	Claudia Weill	United States	
1980	Seems Like Old Times	Jay Sandrich	United States	
1981	All Night Long	Jean-Claude Tramont	United States	
1981	Arthur	Steve Gordon	United States	
1981	Back Roads	Martin Ritt	United States	
1981	Continental Divide	Michael Apted	United States	
1981	Gregory's Girl	Bill Forsyth	Scotland	
1981	Modern Romance	Albert Brooks	United States	
1981	They All Laughed	Peter Bogdanovich	United States	
1982	Best Friends	Norman Jewison	United States	
1982	Grease 2	Patricia Birch	United States	
1982	Kiss Me Goodbye	Robert Mulligan	United States	
1982	A Little Sex	Bruce Paltrow	United States	
1982	Summer Lovers	Randal Kleiser	United States	
1982	Tootsie	Sydney Pollack	United States	
1982	Yes, Giorgio	Franklin J. Schaffner	United States	
1983	Baby It's You	John Sayles	United States	
1983	Lovesick	Marshall Brickman	United States	
1983	Risky Business	Paul Brickman	United States	
1983	Romantic Comedy	Arthur Hiller	United States	
1983	Two of a Kind	John Herzfeld	United States	
1983	Valley Girl	Martha Coolidge	United States	
1984	Blame It on Rio	Stanley Donen	United States	
1984	Electric Dreams	Steve Barron	United States	
1984	The Lonely Guy	Arthur Hiller	United States	
1984	Micki & Maude	Blake Edwards	United States	
1984	Romancing the Stone	Robert Zemeckis	United States	
1984	Splash	Ron Howard	United States	
1984	Unfaithfully Yours	Howard Zieff	United States	
1984	The Woman in Red	Gene Wilder	United States	
1985	Better Off Dead	Savage Steve Holland	United States	
1985	The Jewel of the Nile	Lewis Teague	United States	
1985	Mischief	Mel Damski	United States	
1985	Murphy's Romance	Martin Ritt	United States	
1985	Prizzi's Honor	John Huston	United States	
1985	The Purple Rose of Cairo	Woody Allen	United States	
1985	Secret Admirer	David Greenwalt	United States	
1985	The Slugger's Wife	Hal Ashby	United States	
1985	The Sure Thing	Rob Reiner	United States	
1986	About Last Night	Edward Zwick	United States	
1986	Legal Eagles	Ivan Reitman	United States	
1986	The Money Pit	Richard Benjamin	United States	
1986	One Crazy Summer	Savage Steve Holland	United States	
1986	Peggy Sue Got Married	Francis Ford Coppola	United States	
1986	Pretty in Pink	Howard Deutch	United States	
1986	Under the Cherry Moon	Prince	United States	
1987	Baby Boom	Charles Shyer	United States	
1987	Blind Date	Blake Edwards	United States	
1987	Broadcast News	James L. Brooks	United States	
1987	Can't Buy Me Love	Steve Rash	United States	
1987	Cross My Heart	Armyan Bernstein	United States	
1987	Date with an Angel	Tom McLoughlin	United States	
1987	Made in Heaven	Alan Rudolph	United States	
1987	Mannequin	Michael Gottlieb	United States	
1987	Moonstruck	Norman Jewison	United States	
1987	Overboard	Garry Marshall	United States	
1987	The Pick-up Artist	James Toback	United States	
1987	The Princess Bride	Rob Reiner	United States	
1987	Roxanne	Fred Schepisi	United States	
1987	Some Kind of Wonderful	Howard Deutch	United States	
1987	Who's That Girl	James Foley	United States	
1988	The Accidental Tourist	Lawrence Kasdan	United States	
1988	Bull Durham	Ron Shelton	United States	
1988	Cocktail	Roger Donaldson	United States	
1988	Coming to America	John Landis	United States	
1988	Crossing Delancey	Joan Micklin Silver	United States	
1988	Earth Girls Are Easy	Julien Temple	United States	
1988	Married to the Mob	Jonathan Demme	United States	
1988	She's Having a Baby	John Hughes	United States	
1988	Working Girl	Mike Nichols	United States	
1989	Chances Are	Emile Ardolino	United States	
1989	Cousins	Joel Schumacher	United States	
1989	Her Alibi	Bruce Beresford	United States	
1989	Say Anything...	Cameron Crowe	United States	
1989	Skin Deep	Blake Edwards	United States	
1989	When Harry Met Sally...	Rob Reiner	United States	
1989	Worth Winning	Will Mackenzie	United States	

== 1990s ==
Year	Title	Director	Country	Genre/notes
1990	Betsy's Wedding	Alan Alda	United States	
1990	Don't Tell Her It's Me	Malcolm Mowbray	United States	
1990	Funny About Love	Leonard Nimoy	United States	
1990	Green Card	Peter Weir	United States	
1990	Metropolitan	Whit Stillman	United States	
1990	Pretty Woman	Garry Marshall	United States	
1991	Career Opportunities	Bryan Gordon	United States	
1991	Defending Your Life	Albert Brooks	United States	
1991	Doc Hollywood	Michael Caton-Jones	United States	
1991	Frankie and Johnny	Garry Marshall	United States	
1991	He Said, She Said	Ken Kwapis & Marisa Silver	United States	
1991	L.A. Story	Mick Jackson	United States	
1991	The Marrying Man	Jerry Rees	United States	
1991	Mystery Date	Jonathan Wacks	United States	
1992	Boomerang	Reginald Hudlin	United States	
1992	The Cutting Edge	Paul Michael Glaser	United States	
1992	Honeymoon in Vegas	Andrew Bergman	United States	
1992	Housesitter	Frank Oz	United States	
1992	Love Potion No. 9	Dale Launer	United States	
1992	Strictly Ballroom	Baz Luhrmann	Australia	
1993	Born Yesterday	Luis Mandoki	United States	
1993	For Love or Money	Barry Sonnenfeld	United States	
1993	Groundhog Day	Harold Ramis	United States	Fantasy
1993	Mr. Wonderful	Anthony Minghella	United States	
1993	Much Ado About Nothing	Kenneth Branagh	United States United Kingdom	
1993	Sleepless in Seattle	Nora Ephron	United States	
1993	The Wedding Banquet	Ang Lee	Taiwan United States	
1994	Chungking Express	Wong Kar-wai	Hong Kong	
1994	The Favor	Donald Petrie	United States	
1994	Four Weddings and a Funeral	Mike Newell	United Kingdom	
1994	I.Q.	Fred Schepisi	United States	
1994	It Could Happen to You	Andrew Bergman	United States	
1994	Only You	Norman Jewison	United States	
1994	Reality Bites	Ben Stiller	United States	
1994	Speechless	Ron Underwood	United States	
1995	The American President	Rob Reiner	United States	
1995	Clueless	Amy Heckerling	United States	
1995	Forget Paris	Billy Crystal	United States	
1995	Fallen Angels	Wong Kar-wai	Hong Kong	
1995	French Kiss	Lawrence Kasdan	United States	
1995	The Incredibly True Adventure of Two Girls in Love	Maria Maggenti	United States	
1995	Mighty Aphrodite	Woody Allen	United States	
1995	Nine Months	Chris Columbus	United States	
1995	Sabrina	Sydney Pollack	United States	
1995	While You Were Sleeping	Jon Turteltaub	United States	
1996	Beautiful Girls	Ted Demme	United States	
1996	Everyone Says I Love You	Woody Allen	United States	Musical
1996	Jerry Maguire	Cameron Crowe	United States	Sports
1996	The Mirror Has Two Faces	Barbra Streisand	United States	
1996	Mrs. Winterbourne	Richard Benjamin	United States	
1996	One Fine Day	Michael Hoffman	United States	
1996	The Pallbearer	Matt Reeves	United States	
1996	Tin Cup	Ron Shelton	United States	
1996	Emma	Douglas McGrath	United States	Period
1996	The Truth About Cats & Dogs	Michael Lehmann	United States	
1997	Addicted to Love	Griffin Dunne	United States	
1997	As Good as It Gets	James L. Brooks	United States	
1997	Chasing Amy	Kevin Smith	United States	
1997	Fever Pitch	David Evans	United Kingdom	
1997	Fools Rush In	Andy Tennant	United States	
1997	In & Out	Frank Oz	United States	LGBT+
1997	The Matchmaker	Mark Joffe	United States United Kingdom Ireland	
1997	My Best Friend's Wedding	P. J. Hogan	United States	
1997	Out to Sea	Martha Coolidge	United States	
1997	Picture Perfect	Glenn Gordon Caron	United States	
1998	How Stella Got Her Groove Back	Kevin Rodney Sullivan	United States	
1998	Overnight Delivery	Jason Bloom	United States	
1998	The Parent Trap	Nancy Meyers	United States	
1998	Shakespeare in Love	John Madden	United States; United Kingdom	
1998	Sliding Doors	Peter Howitt	United States	Fantasy
1998	There's Something About Mary	Farrelly brothers	United States	Sex comedy
1998	The Wedding Singer	Frank Coraci	United States	
1998	You've Got Mail	Nora Ephron	United States	
1999	10 Things I Hate About You	Gil Junger	United States	Teen
1999	American Pie	Paul Weitz	United States	Teen; Sex comedy
1999	The Bachelor	Gary Sinyor	United States	
1999	The Best Man	Malcolm D. Lee	United States	
1999	Blast from the Past	Hugh Wilson	United States	Fantasy
1999	But I'm a Cheerleader	Jamie Babbit	United States	Teen; LGBT+
1999	Forces of Nature	Bronwen Hughes	United States	
1999	An Ideal Husband	Oliver Parker	United Kingdom	
1999	Never Been Kissed	Raja Gosnell	United States	
1999	Notting Hill	Roger Michell	United Kingdom	
1999	Runaway Bride	Garry Marshall	United States	
1999	She's All That	Robert Iscove	United States	
1999	Three to Tango	Damon Santostefano	United States	

== 2000s ==
Year	Title	Director	Country	Genre/notes
2000	Coyote Ugly	David McNally	United States	
2000	High Fidelity	Stephen Frears	United States	
2000	Keeping the Faith	Edward Norton	United States	
2000	Return to Me	Bonnie Hunt	United States	
2000	What Women Want	Nancy Meyers	United States	
2001	Amélie	Jean-Pierre Jeunet	France; Germany	
2001	America's Sweethearts	Joe Roth	United States	
2001	Bridget Jones's Diary	Sharon Maguire	United States; United Kingdom; Ireland; France	
2001	The Brothers	Gary Hadwick	United States	
2001	Get Over It	Tommy O'Haver	United States	
2001	Head over Heels	Mark Waters	United States	
2001	Heartbreakers	David Mirkin	United States	
2001	Kate & Leopold	James Mangold	United States	
2001	Legally Blonde	Robert Luketic	United States	
2001	My Sassy Girl	Kwak Jae-yong	South Korea	
2001	Summer Catch	Mike Tollin	United States	
2001	Serendipity	Peter Chelsom	United States	
2001	Shallow Hal	Farrelly brothers	United States; Germany	
2001	Someone Like You	Tony Goldwyn	United States	
2001	Two Can Play That Game	Mark Brown	United States	
2001	The Wedding Planner	Adam Shankman	United States	
2002	Brown Sugar	Rick Famuyiwa	United States	
2002	Maid in Manhattan	Wayne Wang	United States	
2002	My Big Fat Greek Wedding	Joel Zwick	United States; Canada; Greece	
2002	Punch-Drunk Love	Paul Thomas Anderson	United States	
2002	Sweet Home Alabama	Andy Tennant	United States	
2002	Secretary	Steven Shainberg	United States	
2002	The Sweetest Thing	Roger Kumble	United States	
2002	Two Weeks Notice	Marc Lawrence	United States; Australia	
2003	Deliver Us from Eva	Gary Hardwick	United States	
2003	Down with Love	Peyton Reed	United States	
2003	The Fighting Temptations	Jonathan Lynn	United States	
2003	How to Lose a Guy in 10 Days	Donald Petrie	United States; Germany	
2003	Intolerable Cruelty	Joel and Ethan Coen	United States	
2003	Just Married	Shawn Levy	United States; Germany	
2003	Love Actually	Richard Curtis	United Kingdom; United States; France	
2003	Lost in Translation	Sofia Coppola	United States	
2003	Something's Gotta Give	Nancy Meyers	United States	
2003	Under the Tuscan Sun	Audrey Wells	United States	
2003	What a Girl Wants	Dennie Gordon	United States	
2004	13 Going on 30	Gary Winick	United States	
2004	50 First Dates	Peter Segal	United States	
2004	Along Came Polly	John Hamburg	United States	
2004	Bride and Prejudice	Gurinder Chadha	United Kingdom; United States; India	
2004	Bridget Jones: The Edge of Reason	Beeban Kidron	United Kingdom; France; Germany; Ireland; United States	
2004	Chasing Liberty	Andy Cadiff	United States	
2004	A Cinderella Story	Mark Rosman	United States	
2004	Eating Out	Q. Allan Brocka	United States	
2004	The Girl Next Door	Luke Greenfield	United States	
2004	Jersey Girl	Kevin Smith	United States	
2004	Laws of Attraction	Peter Howitt	Ireland; United Kingdom; Germany	
2004	The Prince & Me	Martha Coolidge	United States	
2004	The Princess Diaries 2: Royal Engagement	Garry Marshall	United States	
2004	Sideways	Alexander Payne	United States	
2004	Surviving Christmas	Mike Mitchell	United States	
2004	Wimbledon	Richard Loncraine	United Kingdom	
2004	Win a Date with Tad Hamilton!	Robert Luketic	United States	
2005	The 40-Year-Old Virgin	Judd Apatow	United States	
2005	The Baxter	Michael Showalter	United States	
2005	Fever Pitch	Farrelly brothers	United States	
2005	Hitch	Andy Tennant	United States	
2005	Imagine Me & You	Ol Parker	United Kingdom; United States	
2005	Just Friends	Roger Kumble	United States	
2005	Just like Heaven	Mark Waters	United States	
2005	Little Manhattan	Mark Levin Jennifer Flackett	United States	
2005	A Lot like Love	Nigel Cole	United States	
2005	Me and You and Everyone We Know	Miranda July	United States	
2005	Monster-in-Law	Robert Luketic	United States	
2005	Mr. and Mrs. Smith	Doug Liman	United States	Action
2005	Must Love Dogs	Gary David Goldberg	United States	
2005	Rumor Has It	Rob Reiner	United States	
2005	Shopgirl	Anand Tucker	United States	
2005	Wedding Crashers	David Dobkin	United States	
2005	The Wedding Date	Clare Kilner	United States	
2006	The Break-Up	Peyton Reed	United States	
2006	Eating Out 2: Sloppy Seconds	Phillip J. Bartell	United States	
2006	Failure to Launch	Tom Dey	United States	
2006	A Good Year	Ridley Scott	United States; United Kingdom	
2006	The Holiday	Nancy Meyers	United States	
2006	John Tucker Must Die	Betty Thomas	United States Canada	
2006	Just My Luck	Donald Petrie	United States	
2006	Last Holiday	Wayne Wang	United States	
2006	Love and Other Disasters	Alek Keshishian	United Kingdom France	
2006	She's the Man	Andy Fickman	United States	
2006	You, Me and Dupree	Russo brothers	United States	
2007	Because I Said So	Michael Lehmann	United States	
2007	Dan in Real Life	Peter Hedges	United States	
2007	License to Wed	Ken Kwapis	United States	
2007	Enchanted	Kevin Lima	United States	Fantasy musical
2007	Good Luck Chuck	Mark Helfrich	United States	
2007	Hairspray	Adam Shankman	United States	Musical
2007	The Heartbreak Kid	Farrelly brothers	United States	
2007	Lars and the Real Girl	Craig Gillespie	Canada United States	
2007	Bee Movie	Simon J. Smith Steve Hickner	United States	Fantasy comedy
2007	I Think I Love My Wife	Chris Rock	United States	
2007	Yewendoch Guday	Henok Ayele	Ethiopia	
2007	Knocked Up	Judd Apatow	United States	
2007	Music and Lyrics	Marc Lawrence	United States	
2007	Secret	Jay Chou	Taiwan; China	
2007	Sydney White	Joe Nussbaum	United States	
2008	27 Dresses	Anne Fletcher	United States	
2008	The Accidental Husband	Griffin Dunne	United States	
2008	WALL-E	Andrew Stanton	United States	science fiction
2008	Definitely, Maybe	Adam Brooks	United States	
2008	Fool's Gold	Andy Tennant	United States; Australia	
2008	Forgetting Sarah Marshall	Nicholas Stoller	United States	
2008	How to Lose Friends & Alienate People	Robert B. Weide	United Kingdom	
2008	Made of Honor	Paul Weiland	United States	
2008	Mamma Mia!	Phyllida Lloyd	United Kingdom United States Sweden	
2008	Management	Stephen Belber	United States	
2008	My Best Friend's Girl	Howard Deutch	United States	
2008	Nick & Norah's Infinite Playlist	Peter Sollett	United States	
2008	The Other End of the Line	James Dodson	United States	
2008	Over Her Dead Body	Jeff Lowell	United States	
2008	Picture This	Stephen Herek	United States	
2008	Sex and the City	Michael Patrick King	United States	
2008	Vicky Cristina Barcelona	Woody Allen	United States	
2008	What Happens in Vegas	Tom Vaughan	United States	
2008	Yes Man	Peyton Reed	United States	
2008	Zack and Miri Make a Porno	Kevin Smith	United States	
2009	500 Days of Summer	Marc Webb	United States	
2009	American Pie Presents: The Book of Love	John Putch	United States	
2009	Bride Wars	Gary Winick	United States	
2009	Confessions of a Shopaholic	P. J. Hogan	United States	
2009	Couples Retreat	Peter Billingsley	United States	
2009	Did You Hear About the Morgans?	Marc Lawrence	United States	
2009	Duplicity	Tony Gilroy	United States	
2009	Eating Out 3: All You Can Eat	Glenn Gaylord	United States	
2009	Ghosts of Girlfriends Past	Mark Waters	United States	
2009	He's Just Not That into You	Ken Kwapis	United States	
2009	I Hate Valentine's Day	Nia Vardalos	United States	
2009	I Love You Beth Cooper	Chris Columbus	United States	
2009	It's Complicated	Nancy Meyers	United States	
2009	My Life in Ruins	Donald Petrie	United States	
2009	Play the Game	Marc Fienberg	United States	
2009	The Proposal	Anne Fletcher	United States	
2009	The Rebound	Bart Freundlich	United States	
2009	The Ugly Truth	Robert Luketic	United States	

== 2010s ==
Year	Title	Director	Country	Genre/notes
2010	The Back-up Plan	Alan Poul	United States	
2010	Beginners	Mike Mills	United States	
2010	The Bounty Hunter	Andy Tennant	United States	Action
2010	Easy A	Will Gluck	United States	Teen
2010	Going the Distance	Nanette Burstein	United States	
2010	How Do You Know	James L. Brooks	United States	
2010	Just Wright	Sanaa Hamri	United States	
2010	Killers	Robert Luketic	United States	
2010	Knight and Day	James Mangold	United States	Action
2010	Leap Year	Anand Tucker	United States	
2010	Letters to Juliet	Gary Winick	United States	
2010	Life as We Know It	Greg Berlanti	United States	
2010	Love & Other Drugs	Edward Zwick	United States	
2010	My Sassy Girl 2	Joe Ma	China	
2010	Scott Pilgrim vs. the World	Edgar Wright	United States; United Kingdom; Japan	Action
2010	Sex and the City 2	Michael Patrick King	United States	
2010	She's Out of My League	Jim Field Smith	United States	
2010	The Switch	Will Speck; Josh Gordon	United States	
2010	Valentine's Day	Garry Marshall	United States	
2010	When in Rome	Mark Steven Johnson	United States	
2011	The Change-Up	David Dobkin	United States	Fantasy
2011	Crazy, Stupid, Love	Glenn Ficarra; John Requa	United States	
2011	Eating Out: Drama Camp	Q. Allan Brocka	United States	
2011	Friends with Benefits	Will Gluck	United States	
2011	From Prada to Nada	Angel Gracia	United States	
2011	I Don't Know How She Does It	Douglas McGrath	United States	
2011	Just Go with It	Dennis Dugan	United States	
2011	Larry Crowne	Tom Hanks	United States	
2011	Midnight In Paris	Woody Allen	United States	Fantasy
2011	New Year's Eve	Garry Marshall	United States	
2011	No Strings Attached	Ivan Reitman	United States	
2011	Something Borrowed	Luke Greenfield	United States	
2011	Summer Love Love	Wilson Kwok-wai Chin	China; Hong Kong	
2011	Take Me Home Tonight	Michael Dowse	United States	
2011	Take This Waltz	Sarah Polley	Canada	
2011	The Decoy Bride	Sheree Folkson	United Kingdom	
2011	What's Your Number?	Mark Mylod	United States	
2011	Your Sister's Sister	Lynn Shelton	United States	
2012	American Reunion	Jon Hurwitz; Hayden Schlossberg	United States	
2012	Bachelorette	Leslye Headland	United States	
2012	Celeste and Jesse Forever	Lee Toland Krieger	United States	
2012	Eating Out 5: The Open Weekend	Q. Allan Brocka	United States	
2012	Exit Strategy	Michael Whitton	United States	
2012	The Five-Year Engagement	Nicholas Stoller	United States	
2012	Friends with Kids	Jennifer Westfeldt	United States	
2012	Moonrise Kingdom	Wes Anderson	United States	
2012	One Small Hitch	John Burgess	United States	
2012	Playing for Keeps	Gabriele Muccino	United States	
2012	Ruby Sparks	Jonathan Dayton; Valerie Faris	United States	
2012	Salmon Fishing in the Yemen	Lasse Hallström	United Kingdom	
2012	The Sessions	Ben Lewin	United States	Biopic
2012	Silver Linings Playbook	David O. Russell	United States	
2012	The Skinny	Patrik-Ian Polk	United States	
2012	Student of the Year	Karan Johar	India	
2012	Thanks for Sharing	Stuart Blumberg	United States	
2012	Think Like a Man	Tim Story	United States	
2012	This is 40	Judd Apatow	United States	
2012	This Means War	McG	United States	Spy
2013	About Time	Richard Curtis	United Kingdom	Science fiction
2013	Admission	Paul Weitz	United States	
2013	Baggage Claim	David E. Talbert	United States	
2013	The Best Plan Is No Plan	Patrick Kong	Hong Kong	
2013	The Callback Queen	Graham Cantwell	United Kingdom	
2013	Dating Fever	Han Jing	China	
2013	Don Jon	Joseph Gordon-Levitt	United States	
2013	Enough Said	Nicole Holofcener	United States	
2013	Goddess	Mark Lamprell	Australia	
2013	Love Story	Guan Er	China	
2013	Odeio o Dia dos Namorados	Roberto Santucci	Brazil	
2013	Sunshine Love	Jo Eun-sung	South Korea	
2013	Warm Bodies	Jonathan Levine	United States	Science fiction
2013	What If?	Michael Dowse	Canada; Ireland	
2014	About Last Night	Steve Pink	United States	
2014	Bad Sister	Kim Tae-kyun	China	
2014	Blended	Frank Coraci	United States	
2014	Break Up 100	Lawrence Cheng	Hong Kong	
2014	Café. Waiting. Love	Chiang Chin-lin	Taiwan	
2014	Crazy Love	Cong Yi	China	
2014	Waiting for Your Love	Gao Genrong; Xie Lianghong	China	
2014	Don't Go Breaking My Heart 2	Johnnie To	Hong Kong; China	
2014	Entertainment	Akshay Kumar	India	
2014	Fiji Love	Tao Sheng	China	
2014	Forever Love	Zhao Yiran Wei Jie	China	
2014	Girls	Wong Chun-chun	China	
2014	Give Seven Days	Tang Xu	China	
2014	Humpty Sharma Ki Dulhania	Shashank Khaitan	India	
2014	Kung Fu Angels	Herman Yau	Hong Kong; China	
2014	Laggies	Lynn Shelton	United States	
2014	Let Hoi Decide	Charlie Nguyen	Vietnam	
2014	Love, Rosie	Christian Ditter	United Kingdom	
2014	Lust for Love	Anton King	United States	
2014	Magic in the Moonlight	Woody Allen	United States	
2014	Main Tera Hero	David Dhawan	India	
2014	Meet Miss Anxiety	Kwak Jae-yong	China	
2014	My Geeky Nerdy Buddies	Kevin Chu	Taiwan; China; Hong Kong	
2014	Nature Law	Li Jian; Qiu Zhongwei	China; Singapore	
2014	Obvious Child	Gillian Robespierre	United States	
2014	Playing It Cool	Justin Reardon	United States	
2014	Sei Lá	Joaquim Leitão	Portugal	
2014	That Awkward Moment	Tom Gormican	United States	
2014	They Came Together	David Wain	United States	Satire
2014	Who Moved My Dream	Wang Wei; Jackson Pat	China	
2014	The Longest Week	Peter Glanz	United States	
2014	The Other Woman	Nick Cassavetes	United States	
2014	Women Who Flirt	Pang Ho-cheung	China; Hong Kong	
2015	Ahora o nunca	María Valverde; Dani Rovira; Clara Lago	Spain	
2015	Aloha	Cameron Crowe	United States	
2015	Crazy New Year's Eve	Eva Jin; Pan Anzi; Zhang Jiarui; Song Di	China	
2015	Dolly Ki Doli	Abhishek Dogra	India	
2015	A Dramatic Night	Ha Ki-ho	South Korea	
2015	Follow Me My Queen	Liu Xin	China	
2015	Hello, My Name Is Doris	Michael Showalter	United States	
2015	I'll Never Lose You	Tian Meng	China	
2015	The Lobster	Yorgos Lanthimos	United Kingdom	
2015	Love Clinic	Aaron Kim	South Korea	
2015	Love Without Distance	Aubrey Lam	China	
2015	Lovers & Movies	Niu Chaoyang	China	
2015	Maggie's Plan	Rebecca Miller	United States	
2015	Mr. Right	Paco Cabezas	United States	Action
2015	My New Sassy Girl	Joh Keun-shik	South Korea; China	
2015	One Night Stud	Li Xinman	China	
2015	Paris Holiday	James Yuen	China	
2015	The Right Mistake	Wang Ning	China	
2015	Sleeping with Other People	Leslye Headland	United States	
2015	That Thing Called Tadhana	Antoinette Jadaone	Philippines	
2015	Trainwreck	Judd Apatow	United States	
2015	Zai Jian Wo Men De Shi Nian	Sun Hao	China	
2016	Book of Love	Xue Xiaolu	China; Hong Kong	
2016	Bridget Jones's Baby	Sharon Maguire	United States; United Kingdom; France	
2016	Café Society	Woody Allen	United States	
2016	How to Be Single	Christian Ditter	United States	
2016	Kōdai-ke no Hitobito	Masato Hijikata	Japan	
2016	La La Land	Damien Chazelle	United States	Musical
2016	Like for Likes	Park Hyeon-jin	South Korea	
2016	The Mermaid	Stephen Chow	China	
2016	My Big Fat Greek Wedding 2	Kirk Jones	United States	Sequel to My Big Fat Greek Wedding
2016	The Rise of a Tomboy	Guo Dalei	China	
2016	Rules Don't Apply	Warren Beatty	United States	
2016	See You Tomorrow	Zhang Jiajia	China	
2016	Some Like It Hot	Song Xiaofei; Dong Xu	China	
2016	Why Him?	John Hamburg	United States	
2017	Badrinath Ki Dulhania	Shashank Khaitan	India	
2017	The Big Sick	Michael Showalter	United States	
2017	Finding Fatimah	Oz Arshad	United Kingdom	
2017	Happy Birthday, Toby Simpson	Patrick Makin	United Kingdom	Romantic comedy-drama
2017	Home Again	Hallie Meyers-Shyer	United States	
2017	The Incredible Jessica James	James C. Strouse	United States	
2017	Kita Kita	Sigrid Andrea Bernardo	Philippines	
2017	The Last Word	Mark Pellington	United States	
2017	Mubarakan	Anees Bazmee	India	
2017	Phantom Thread	Paul Thomas Anderson	United States	
2017	Sweet 20	Ody C. Harahap	Indonesia	
2017	You, Me and Him	Daisy Aitkens	United Kingdom	
2018	Alex Strangelove	Craig Johnson	United States	
2018	Crazy Rich Asians	Jon M. Chu	United States	
2018	How to Talk to Girls at Parties	John Cameron Mitchell	United Kingdom	Science Fiction
2018	Juliet, Naked	Jesse Peretz	United Kingdom	
2018	I Feel Pretty	McG	United Status	
2018	The Kissing Booth	Vince Marcello	United States	Teen
2018	Love, Simon	Greg Berlanti	United States	Coming-of-Age
2018	Mamma Mia! Here We Go Again	Ol Parker	United Kingdom	Musical; Sequel to Mamma Mia!
2018	Nappily Ever After	Haifaa al-Mansour	United States	
2018	Nobody's Fool	Tyler Perry	United States	
2018	The Princess Switch	Michael Rohl	United States	
2018	Set It Up	Claire Scanlon	United States	
2018	To All the Boys I've Loved Before	Susan Johnson	United States	Teen
2018	When We First Met	Ari Sandel	United States	
2019	Always Be My Maybe	Nahnatchka Khan	United States	
2019	Good Sam	Kate Melville	United States	
2019	Isn't It Romantic	Todd Strauss-Schulson	United States	Satire
2019	Jexi	Jon Lucas; Scott Moore	United States	Science fiction
2019	Last Christmas	Paul Feig	United Kingdom	
2019	Let It Snow	Luke Snellin	United States	
2019	Long Shot	Jonathan Levine	United States	
2019	The Perfect Date	Chris Nelson	United States	Teen
2019	Photograph	Ritesh Batra	India	Coming-of-Age
2019	A Rainy Day in New York	Woody Allen	United States	
2019	Someone Great	Jennifer Kaytin Robinson	United States	
2019	Tall Girl	Nzingha Stewart	United States	Teen
2019	What Men Want	Adam Shankman	United States	Fantasy
2019	Yesterday	Danny Boyle	United Kingdom	Fantasy musical

== 2020s ==
Year	Title	Director	Country	Genre/notes
2020	The Broken Hearts Gallery	Natalie Krinsky	United States; Canada	
2020	Emma.	Autumn de Wilde	United Kingdom; United States	
2020	Happiest Season	Clea DuVall	United States	
2020	Holidate	John Whitesell	United States	
2020	Really Love	Angel Kristi Williams	United States	
2020	Isi & Ossi	Oliver Kleine	Germany	
2020	The Kissing Booth 2	Vince Marcello	United Kingdom	Sequel to the 2018 film
2020	Locos de amor 3	Frank Pérez-Garland	Peru	Musical
2020	Love, Guaranteed	Mark Steven Johnson	United States	
2020	Love Wedding Repeat	Dean Craig	United Kingdom; Italy	
2020	The Lovebirds	Michael Showalter	United States	
2020	Palm Springs	Max Barbokow	United States	Science fiction
2020	Romulo & Julita	Daniel Martín Rodríguez	Peru	
2020	Sí, mi amor	Pedro Flores Maldonado	Peru	
2020	A Simple Wedding	Sara Zandieh	United States	
2020	The Thing About Harry	Peter Paige	United States	Made for Television film
2020	To All the Boys: P.S. I Still Love You	Michael Fimognari	United States	Sequel to the 2018 film
2020	Wild Mountain Thyme	John Patrick Shanley	United Kingdom; Ireland	
2020	Window Boy Would Also Like to Have a Submarine	Alex Piperno	Uruguay; Argentina; Brazil; Netherlands; Philippines	
2021	Army of Thieves	Matthias Schweighöfer	United States; Germany	Heist
2021	Big Red Envelope	Li Kelong	China	
2021	Coming 2 America	Craig Brewer	United States	Sequel to Coming to America
2021	The Hating Game	Peter Hutchings	United States	
2021	He's All That	Mark Waters	United States	
2021	The French Dispatch	Wes Anderson	United States	
2021	The Kissing Booth 3	Vince Marcello	United States	Sequel to the 2020 film
2021	Licorice Pizza	Paul Thomas Anderson	United States	
2021	Locked Down	Doug Liman	United States	Heist
2021	Love Hard	Hernán Jiménez	United States	
2021	No es lo que parece	David Maler	Dominican Republic	
2021	Single All the Way	Michael Mayer	Canada	
2021	To All the Boys: Always and Forever	Michael Fimognari	United States	Sequel to the 2020 film
2021	The Worst Person in the World	Joachim Trier	Norway	
2022	About Fate	Maryus Vaysberg	United States	
2022	Acuérdate de mí	Sebastian García	Peru	
2022	Badhaai Do	Harshavardhan Kulkarni	India	
2022	Bros	Nicholas Stoller	United States	
2022	Crush	Sammi Cohen	United States	Teen
2022	Falling for Christmas	Janeen Damien	United States	
2022	Fire Island	Andrew Ahn	United States	Inspired by Pride & Prejudice
2022	Four to Dinner	Alessio Maria Federici	Italy	
2022	Good Luck to You, Leo Grande	Sophie Hyde	United Kingdom	
2022	I Want You Back	Jason Orly	United States	
2022	Impregnated	Gianfranco Quattrini	Peru Argentina	
2022	It's a Fat World	Sandro Ventura	Peru	
2022	Let's Tie the Knot, Honey!	Pedro Flores Maldonado	Peru	Sequel to Sí, mi amor
2022	The Lost City	Aaron and Adam Nee	United States	Action-adventure
2022	Love and Leashes	Park Hyun-jin	South Korea	
2022	Love Tactics	Emre Kabakuşak	Turkey	
2022	Marry Me	Kat Coiro	United States	
2022	Meet Cute	Alex Lehmann	United States	Science fiction
2022	Moonshot	Chris Winterbauer	United States	Science fiction
2022	Un romance singular	Wesley Verástegui	Peru	
2022	Tall Girl 2	Emily Ting	United States	
2022	Three Months	Jared Frieder	United States	
2022	Ticket to Paradise	Ol Parker	United States	
2022	Sanctuary	Zachary Wigon	United States	Psychological thriller
2022	Spin Me Round	Jeff Baena	United States	Thriller
2022	Sita Ramam	Hanu Raghavapudi	India	
2022	Shotgun Wedding	Jason Moore	United States	Action
2022	The Valet	Richard Wong	United States	Remake of The Valet
2022	Wedding Season	Tom Dey	United States	
2022	Without Saying Goodbye	Bruno Ascenzo	Peru	
2023	30-Year-Old Toddler	Gonzalo Badilla	Chile	
2023	Anyone But You	Will Gluck	United States	
2023	Asteroid City	Wes Anderson	United States	
2023	At Midnight	Jonah Feingold	Mexico	
2023	Ben & Lacy	Michael Shacket	United States	
2023	Book Club: The Next Chapter	Bill Holderman	United States	Sequel to Book Club
2023	Casi muerta	Fernán Mirás	Argentina; Uruguay	Remake of Bypass
2023	Elemental	Peter Sohn	United States	Animated fantasy
2023	Fallen Leaves	Aki Kaurismaki	Finland; Germany	
2023	Ghosted	Dexter Fletcher	United States	
2023	Ghudchadi	Binoy Gandhi	India	
2023	Happiness for Beginners	Vicky Wight	United States	
2023	Hot Frosty	Jerry Ciccoritti	United States	
2023	Love Again	James C. Strouse	United States	
2023	Love at First Sight	Vanessa Caswill	United States	
2023	Love in Taipei	Arvin Chen	United States	
2023	Magic Mike's Last Dance	Steven Soderbergh	United States	Sequel to Magic Mike XXL
2023	Maybe I Do	Michael Jacobs	United States	
2023	The Other Zoey	Sara Zandieh	United States	
2023	The Perfect Find	Numa Perrier	United States	
2023	Poor Things	Yorgos Lanthimos	United States	
2023	Prom Pact	Anya Adams	United States	Disney Channel Original Movie
2023	Red, White, and Royal Blue	Matthew Lopez	United States	
2023	Rye Lane	Raine Allen-Miller	United Kingdom	
2023	Somebody I Used to Know	Dave Franco	United States	
2023	The Tenderness	Vicente Villanueva	Spain; Dominican Republic	
2023	A Tourist's Guide to Love	Steven K. Tsuchida	United States	
2023	An Unexpected Marriage	Enrique Chimoy Sierra	Peru	
2023	The Wedding Hustler	Chris Soriano	United States	
2023	What Happens Later	Meg Ryan	United States	
2023	What's Love Got to Do With It?	Shekhar Kapur	United Kingdom	
2023	Which Brings Me to You	Peter Hutchings	United States	
2023	You People	Kenya Barris	United States	
2023	Your Place or Mine	Aline Brosh McKenna	United States	
2024	And Mrs	Daniel Reisinger	United Kingdom	
2024	Anora	Sean Baker	United States	
2024	Bonus Track	Julia Jackman	United Kingdom	Coming of age
2024	The Fall Guy	David Leitch	United States	Action
2024	A Family Affair	Richard LaGravenese	United States	
2024	Fly Me to the Moon	Greg Berlanti	United States	
2024	The Greatest Hits	Ned Benson	United States	Fantasy
2024	Hit Man	Richard Linklater	United States	Action
2024	How to Date Billy Walsh	Alex Sanjiv Pillai	United Kingdom	
2024	The Idea of You	Michael Showalter	United States	
2024	Irish Wish	Janeen Damian	United States	Fantasy
2024	Lisa Frankenstein	Zelda Williams	United States	Horror comedy
2024	Lonely Planet	Susannah Grant	United States	
2024	Mother of the Bride	Mark Waters	United States	
2024	Música	Rudy Mancuso	United States	
2024	Now There's 3 of Us? Sí, Mi Amor.	Pedro Flores Maldonado	Peru	Sequel to Let's Tie the Knot, Honey!
2024	Our Little Secret	Stephen Herek	United States	
2024	Players	Trish Sie	United States	
2024	Sometimes I Think About Dying	Rachel Lambert	United States	
2024	Sweethearts	Jordan Weiss	United States	
2024	Upgraded	Carlson Young	United States	
2024	Your Monster	Caroline Lindy	United States	Fantasy horror
2024	Welcome to Paradise	Ani Alva Hefer	Peru; Dominican Republic	
2024	We Live in Time	John Crowley	France; United Kingdom	
2025	A Big Bold Beautiful Journey	Kogonada	United States	Fantasy
2025	Bridget Jones: Mad About the Boy	Michael Morris	United Kingdom	Sequel to Bridget Jones's Baby
2025	The Dance Club	Lisa Langseth	Sweden; Norway	
2025	Eternity	David Freyne	United States	Fantasy
2025	Heart Eyes	Josh Ruben	United States	Slasher
2025	La Dolce Villa	Mark Waters	United States	
2025	Materialists	Celine Song	United States	
2025	My Oxford Year	Iain Morris	United States	
2025	Splitsville	Michael Angelo Covino	United States	
2025	Oh, Hi!	Sophie Brooks	United States	
2025	Picture This	Prarthana Mohan	United Kingdom	
2025	Pillion	Harry Lighton	United Kingdom	
2025	The Threesome	Chad Hartigan	United States	
2025	The Wedding Banquet	Andrew Ahn	United States	American remake of the 1993 film
2025	You're Cordially Invited	Nicholas Stoller	United States	
2026	Clashing Through the Snow	Carlson Young	United States	
2026	The Drama	Kristoffer Borgli	United States	
2026	Finding Emily	Alicia MacDonald	United Kingdom	
2026	Good Sex	Lena Dunham	United States	
2026	I Want Your Sex	Gregg Araki	United States	Erotic thriller
2026	The Love Hypothesis	Claire Scanlon	United States	
2026	Mile End Kicks	Chandler Levack	Canada	
2026	Office Romance	Ol Parker	United States	
2026	One Night Only	Will Gluck	United States	Speculative fiction
2026	People We Meet on Vacation	Brett Haley	United States	
2026	Solo Mio	Chuck and Dan Kinnane	United States	
2026	Two Sleepy People	Baron Ryan	United States	
2026	Voicemails for Isabelle	Leah McKendrick	United States	
2026	You, Me, & Tuscany	Kat Coiro	United States	
2026	Wicker	Alex Huston Fischer; Eleanor Wilson	United Kingdom; United States	Fantasy
2027	Beach Read	Yulin Kuang	United States	
2027	The Catch	Dave McCary	United States	Sports
2027	Not Alone	Eric Guillon; Claire Dodgson; Jonathan Del Val	United States	Animated science fiction
2027	Paris Paramount	Nancy Meyers	United States	
2027	Wishful Thinking	Graham Parkes	United States	Science fiction

== See also ==
- List of romantic comedy television series
- List of romance films
