= Black room (disambiguation) =

A black room is a room for intercepting communications, also known as a Cabinet noir.

Blackroom or The Black Room or variation, may also refer to:

== Rooms ==
- A torture chamber
- A room with no sensitive electronic signals. See RED/BLACK concept
- A dark room (sexuality), a darkened room, sometimes located in a nightclub or sex club, where sexual activity takes place

== Films ==
- The Black Room (1935 film), an American horror film starring Boris Karloff
- The Black Room (1982 film), an American horror film starring Cassandra Gava
- The Black Room (2017 film), an American horror film by Rolfe Kanefsky starring Natasha Henstridge, Lin Shaye and Dominique Swain
- The Black Room (2025 film), a Peruvian psychological horror film directed by Pedro Flores Maldonado

== Music ==
- The Black Room (album), an aborted album by The KLF
- The Black Room, soundtrack composed by EDM artist Savant (a.k.a. Aleksander Vinter) 2017

== Other uses ==
- Blackroom (video game), first-person-shooter from Night Work Games

== See also ==
- Darkroom (disambiguation)
