= Darkroom (disambiguation) =

A darkroom is a room for processing light-sensitive photographic materials.

Darkroom, Dark Room, The Darkroom or The Dark Room may also refer to:

== Literature ==
- The Dark Room (play), a one-act play by Tennessee Williams
- The Dark Room (Narayan novel), a 1938 novel by R. K. Narayan
- The Dark Room (Walters novel), a 1995 novel by Minette Walters
- The Dark Room (Seiffert novel), a 2001 novel by Rachel Seiffert
- Dark Rooms (2009 novelette) Nebula-nominated novellette by Lisa Goldstein
- The Dark Room, a 1969 novel by Junnosuke Yoshiyuki
- "The Dark Room" (poem), a poem by Enrique Lihn
- In the Darkroom, a 2016 book by Susan Faludi
- The Dark Room, a 2021 novel by Sam Blake

== Music ==
- Darkroom (band), a British electronic music project
- Dark Rooms, a band formed by American musician Daniel Hart
  - Dark Rooms, 2013 album by Dark Rooms
- Dark Room (The Angels album), a 1980 album by The Angels
- Dark Room (Michele Morrone album), a 2020 album by Michele Morrone
- "Darkroom", a 1996 song by Archive from Londinium
- "Dark Rooms", 1981 song by DA! (band)
- "Dark Rooms", 2010 single by Italian Mafia DJ
- "Darkroom", 1980 song by Paul McCartney
- Darkroom Records, subsidiary record label; see list of Universal Music Group labels

== Television ==
- Darkroom (TV series), a 1980s American thriller series
- The Dark Room, a 1988 television play by Julian Gloag subsequently adapted into his novel Chambre d'ombre (1996)
- The Dark Room, a 1999 BBC adaptation of the novel by Minette Walters starring Dervla Kirwan
- "Darkroom" (CSI: Miami), an episode of CSI: Miami
- "The Dark Room", an episode of Alcoa Presents: One Step Beyond

== Film ==
- The Dark Room (1982 film), an Australian film featuring Baz Luhrmann
- Darkroom (1988 film), directed by Terrence O'Hara and produced by Nico Mastorakis
- The Dark Room (2007 film), a TV film featuring Sandrine Holt

== Other uses ==
- A Dark Room, a 2014 role-playing text-based game released on iOS
- The Dark Room, the fourth episode of the episodically released video game Life Is Strange
- The Dark Room, a live-action video game run by John Robertson (comedian)
- Dark room (sexuality), a darkened room, sometimes located in a nightclub, gay bathhouse or sex club, where sexual activity can take place

== See also ==
- Black room (disambiguation)
- Dark (disambiguation)
- Room (disambiguation)
