= Acuérdate de mí =

Acuérdate de mí may refer to:

- Acuérdate de mí (film), a 2022 Peruvian film
- "Acuerdate de Mi", 1987 single by the American band Selena y Los Dinos
- Acuérdate De Mí, 1998 album by the Mexican group Banda Cuisillos
- Acuerdate de Mí, 1990 album by the Spanish singer Bertín Osborne
- "Acuérdate de mí", 2018 single by the Mexican band Matisse
- "Acuérdate de mí", 1994 song from the album Hambre de Amor by the Mexican singer Patricia Manterola
- "Acuérdate de Mí", 1857 song for voice and piano by the Spanish musician and composer Jesús de Monasterio
