= Soy inocente =

- Theatrical release poster
- Directed by: Pedro Flores Maldonado
- Written by: Yiddá Eslava; Pedro Flores Maldonado
- Produced by: Yiddá Eslava; Julián Zucchi
- Starring: Yiddá Eslava
- Cinematography: Luis Eduardo Hidalgo Casallas
- Music by: Mariano Barrella
- Production company: Wallaz Producciones
- Distributed by: Cinecolor
- Release date: January 19, 2023
- Running time: 100 minutes
- Country: Peru
- Language: Spanish

Soy inocente (lit. 'I'm innocent') is a 2023 Peruvian comedy mystery film directed by Pedro Flores Maldonado and written by Maldonado & Yiddá Eslava (who also co-produced with Julián Zucchi). It stars Yiddá Eslava. The film features the performance of the Argentine singer Pablo Ruiz who acts of himself. It premiered on January 19, 2023, in Peruvian theaters.

== Synopsis ==
Sofia leads an austere life as a housekeeper, wanting to save every penny to support her grandmother and siblings. A day like any other, she is involved in a crime scene in a hotel room. She's innocent, but her fingerprints are everywhere. To keep her job at the colonial hotel and, most importantly, not go to jail, Sofia must prove her innocence. But she needs help, which is why she also incriminates Mame, her co-worker.

== Cast ==
The actors participating in this film are:

- Yiddá Eslava as Sofía
- Mariella Zanetti as María Melissa 'Mame'
- Yarlo Ruiz as Amadeo
- Rodolfo Carrión as Anacleto 'Lagartija'
- Édgar Vivar as Fran
- Pietro Sibille as Roberto
- Patricia Portocarrero as Agata / TV presenter
- Eva Ayllón as Eva
- Jorge Mena as Dangerous Fat
- Pablo Ruiz as himself

== Production ==
Principal photography began in early September 2022 and ended on October 2 of the same year.

== Reception ==
Soy inocente drew over 30,000 viewers in its opening weekend.
