= Let's Tie the Knot, Honey! =

- Theatrical release poster
- Spanish: ¿Nos casamos? Sí, mi amor
- Directed by: Pedro Flores Maldonado
- Written by: Pedro Flores Maldonado; Yiddá Eslava
- Produced by: Yiddá Eslava; Julián Zucchi
- Starring: Yiddá Eslava; Julián Zucchi; Andrés Salas; Magdyel Ugaz; Pietro Sibille
- Cinematography: Luis Hidalgo
- Edited by: Alberto Ponce
- Music by: Deyvis Orosco
- Production company: Wallaz Producciones
- Release date: February 3, 2022
- Running time: 105 minutes
- Country: Peru
- Language: Spanish

Let's Tie the Knot, Honey! (Spanish: ¿Nos casamos? Sí, mi amor, lit. 'We married? Yes, my love') is a 2022 Peruvian romantic comedy film directed by Pedro Flores Maldonado and written by Maldonado & Yiddá Eslava. It is a sequel to the 2020 Peruvian film Sí, mi amor.

== Synopsis ==
Guille decides that it is time to take the next step and so he seeks to ask his beloved to marry him, but things get complicated and nothing goes as planned.

== Cast ==
The actors participating in this film are:

- Yiddá Eslava as Bea
- Julián Zucchi as Guille
- Andrés Salas as Max
- Magdyel Ugaz as Ceci
- Pietro Sibille as Alejandro
- Saskia Bernaola as Marisol

== Release ==
Let's Tie the Knot, Honey! premiered on Febreary 3, 2022 in Peruvian theaters. Like its ancestor, Netflix acquires the international distribution rights of the film and will premiere it on its platform on May 6, 2022.

== Reception ==
In its first weekend in theaters, the film drew over 50,000 viewers. Quickly, the film surpassed 200,000 viewers, becoming the second highest grossing Spanish-language film in South America after the reopening of theaters (2021-2022).

== Sequel ==
In mid-May 2023, the production of a third and final film in the saga titled ¿Ahora somos 3? Sí, mi amor was announced. It premiered on January 25, 2024, in Peruvian theaters.
