= Sí, mi amor =

Sí, mi amor may refer to:

- Sí, mi amor (TV series), 1984 Mexican telenovela
- Sí, mi amor (film), 2020 Peruvian film
