= Niña Bonita =

Niña Bonita may refer to:

- "Niña Bonita", a 2023 song by Feid and Sean Paul
- "Niña Bonita" (song), a 2010 song by Chino & Nacho
- Niña Bonita (album), a 1996 album by Patricia Manterola
- Niña Bonita (telenovela), a 1988 Venezuelan telenovela

== See also ==
- Mi Niña Bonita, a 2010 album by Chino & Nacho
