= The Black Room (2025 film) =

- Theatrical release poster
- Spanish: La habitación negra
- Directed by: Pedro Flores Maldonado
- Written by: Yiddá Eslava; Pedro Flores Maldonado
- Produced by: Guillermo Moreno
- Starring: Yiddá Eslava
- Cinematography: Guillermo Cruz
- Edited by: Guillermo Moreno
- Music by: Mariano Barrella
- Production company: AMU - Agencia de Mentes Únicas
- Release date: October 30, 2025
- Running time: 85 minutes
- Country: Peru
- Language: Spanish

The Black Room (Spanish: La habitación negra) is a 2025 Peruvian psychological horror thriller film co-written and directed by Pedro Flores Maldonado. It stars Yiddá Eslava as an influencer who is forced to broadcast her captivity live, where her audience determines her future.

== Cast ==
The actors participating in this film are:

- Yiddá Eslava as Camila
- Pietro Sibille as Mateo Viral
- Mayra Couto as Susana
- Claudio Calmet as Police
- Nanya Eslava
- Ximena Galiano
- 'El chico de las noticias'

== Release ==
It premiered on October 30, 2025, in Peruvian theaters.

== Box office ==
On its opening day, it attracted 2,200 viewers. By its second day, it had drawn 6,000 viewers, finishing its first weekend with 16,000 viewers. In its second weekend, it accumulated 24,000 viewers.
