= Ya Terminé =

Studio album by Patricia Manterola
- Released: March 30, 2010
- Genre: Latin pop
- Label: Ariola

Patricia Manterola chronology
A Mis Reinas (2006)	Ya Terminé (2010)

Singles from Ya Terminé
- 1. "Ya Terminé"; 2. "Gracias"

Ya Terminé (I've Finished) is the seventh album by the Mexican singer Patricia Manterola.

== Track listing ==
No.	Title	Length
1.	"Mas Que Tu Dinero"	3:20
2.	"Ya Terminé"	3:05
3.	"Gracias"	4:02
4.	"Vive"	3:38
5.	"Ganas De Volar"	3:03
6.	"Y Llegaras"	4:15
7.	"A Contratiempo"	3.24
8.	"Da Igual"	3:48
9.	"Desnudar El Alma"	3:47
10.	"Dime"	3:08
11.	"Fuerte Pero Fragil"	3:09
12.	"Valiente"	3:33
13.	"Ya Terminé (Electro - pop)"	3:06
