= Quiero Más =

Studio album by Patricia Manterola
- Released: November 3, 1998
- Genre: Latin pop
- Label: Fonovisa

Patricia Manterola chronology
Niña Bonita (1996)	Quiero Más (1998)	Que El Ritmo No Pare (2002)

Singles from Quiero Más
- 1. "Quiero Más"; 2. "Si Te Vas"; 3. "Baila Conmigo"

Quiero Más (I Want More) is the third album by the Mexican singer Patricia Manterola.

== Track listing ==
No.	Title	Length
1.	"Si te vas"	3:53
2.	"Quiero más"	4:01
3.	"Hoy me siento diferente"	4:05
4.	"Luna llena"	4:28
5.	"Ya no eres el mismo"	3:33
6.	"Te voy a enamorar"	3:53
7.	"Para vivir sin ti"	3:50
8.	"Tú y yo"
9.	"He decidido"	3:30
10.	"Baila conmigo"	3:21
11.	"Seb's Latin Jungle Mix: Baila conmigo / Si te vas / Tú y yo"
