= A Mis Reinas =

Studio album by Patricia Manterola
- Released: June 20, 2006
- Genre: Latin pop
- Label: Venemusic

Patricia Manterola chronology
Déjame Volar (2003)	A Mis Reinas (2006)	Ya Terminé (2010)

Singles from A Mis Reinas
- 1. "No Controles"

A Mis Reinas (To My Queens) is an album by the Mexican singer Patricia Manterola that was released in 2006. The album includes remakes of her favourite childhood songs.

== Track listing ==
1. "De Mí Enamórate"
2. "Cómo Te Va Mi Amor"
3. "Devorame Otra Vez"
4. "Maldita Primavera"
5. "Cheque En Blanco"
6. "El Me Mintio"
7. "No Controles"
8. "Mentiras"
9. "Acariciame"
10. "Me Gustas Mucho"
11. "Quién Como Tú"
12. "Abrazame"
