= Que El Ritmo No Pare =

Studio album by Patricia Manterola
- Released: March 5, 2002
- Genre: Latin pop
- Label: Ariola

Patricia Manterola chronology
Quiero Más (1998)	Que El Ritmo No Pare (2002)	Déjame Volar (2003)

Singles from Que El Ritmo No Pare
- 1. "Que El Ritmo No Pare"; 2. "Ojos Negros"; 3. "Necesito Tu Amor"; 4. "Libre"

Que El Ritmo No Pare (Don't Let the Rhythm Stop) is the fourth studio album by the Mexican singer Patricia Manterola.

== Singles ==
- "Que El Ritmo No Pare" was the first single from the album. four versions of the songs were recorded: "Que El Fútbol No Pare", for the 2002 FIFA World Cup, "Que Mexico No Pare", used as a fight song for the Mexico national team also as one of the official anthem of the XFL on TUDN, and an English-language version of the song "The Rhythm", used as a theme song for the 2001 Formula One season and is used in the 2014 video game NASCAR '14

== Track listing ==
No.	Title	Length
1.	"Que el ritmo no pare"	3:48
2.	"Salsa"	4:17
3.	"Ojos negros"	4:08
4.	"I’ll see you again"	4:13
5.	"Necesito tu amor"	3:28
6.	"Quiero que quieras volver"	4:39
7.	"Bandidos"	3:28
8.	"Libre"	4:00
9.	"Take my heart"	4:42
10.	"When u move like that (en español)"	4:26
11.	"Tú mi luz"	4:42
12.	"Tell you, tell me (Libre)"	3:57
13.	"The rhythm"	3:45
14.	"Que México no pare"	3:50
15.	"Que el fútbol no pare"	3:44

== The Rhythm ==
No.	Title	Length
1.	"The rhythm (Europe) (Radio Edit Spanglish)"
2.	"I'll see you again"
3.	"Tell you, tell me (Libre)"
4.	"All I need is your love (Necesito tu amor)"
5.	"Magic eyes (Ojos negros) (Fernando Garibay English Radio Mix)"
6.	"Take my heart"
7.	"When u move like that (en español)"
8.	"Come back again (Quiero que quieras volver"
9.	"Salsa"
10.	"Two hearts (Bandidos)"
11.	"Ojos negros"
12.	"Que el ritmo no pare"
13.	"The rhythm (BONUS VIDEOCLIP)"
