= Patricia Manterola =

Mexican singer and actress

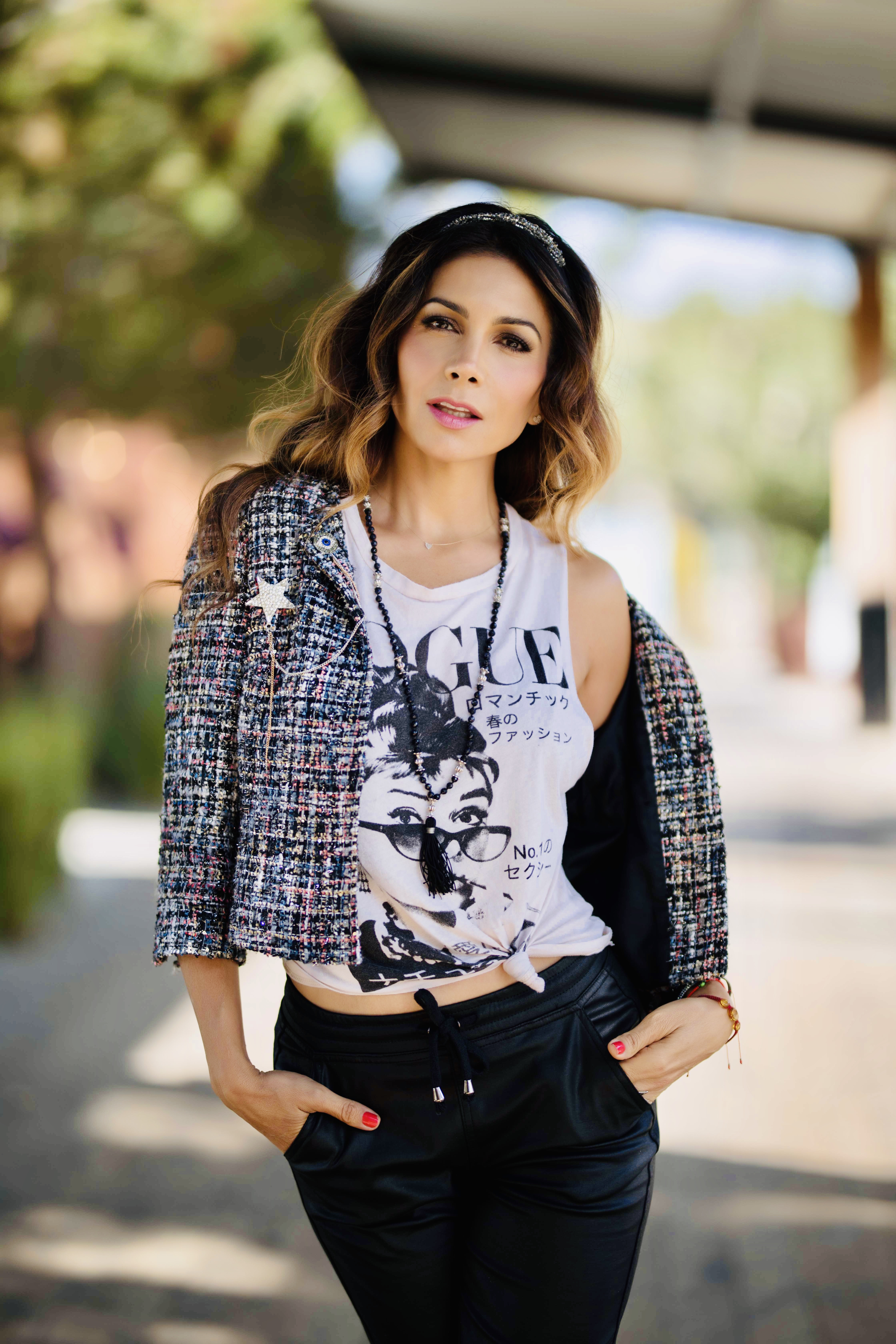

Background information
- Born: Bertha Patricia Manterola Carrión; Mexico City, Mexico
- Genres: Latin pop, pop rock
- Occupations: Singer, actress, host.
- Years active: 1989–present
- Labels: Melody / Fonovisa, Del Angel Music, Sony BMG, Mi Rey Music, Nui Records
- Website: patriciamanterola.com

Patricia Manterola (Spanish pronunciation: [paˈtɾisja manteˈɾola]; born Bertha Patricia Manterola Carrión) is a Mexican singer and actress born in Mexico City.

== Background ==
Patricia Manterola Carrion was born to Jorge Manterola and Maria Dolores Carrion, the second of three children. Her brother Jorge, is 11 months older, and her younger sister Michelle, who shares the same birth date as Patricia, is eight years younger.

Paty—as she is also known—attended elementary school at "Colegio Miguel Angel" and "Franco-Espanol." She studied at "Colegio Oxford" in Cuernavaca during her middle school years, where she lived with her extended family for a while. For high school she attended "Tecnológico de Monterey" de Cuernavaca and graduated in Mexico City at "Colegio Miguel Angel."

In addition to her academics, Paty studied dance, voice, and music. She was the main voice in the chorus of the "Miguel Angel Institute." Since she was a little girl she demonstrated an affinity for the entertainment world, participating in school plays, until at the age of nine, she was part of the musical comedy "Anita la Huerfanita," (Little Orphan Annie). Later, she was part of the festival "Juguemos a Cantar" (1982), together with her brother, Jorge, and two friends, she made it to the finals, which allowed her to record on a compilation album edited for the festival.

Manterola soon entered the world of modeling, which allowed her to meet the Mexican producer Luis de Llano, in 1989, creator of the band, Timbiriche and a successful producer of telenovelas (soap operas). De Llano eventually suggested she audition for the group, but noticing her talent, invited her to be part of a new project known as Garibaldi.

== Personal life ==
On April 17, 1999, Paty married Javier Ortiz, a fellow ex-member of Garibaldi. Yet they divorced a little over five years later, in 2005. In a joint letter to the media, Manterola and Ortiz addressed their separation and asked for the public to respect their privacy during this difficult time. She married Forrest Kolb on December 12, 2010 in Xcaret on the Mayan Riviera, Mexico. They were married in a small private wedding with 200 guests and she was dressed by her close friend, Nicolas Felizola.

== Acting ==
Manterola made her acting debut with ¿Dónde Quedó La Bolita? (1993), a comedy featuring Garibaldi. In 1994, after a Garibaldi live performance in Acapulco, Manterola launched her solo career with the release of Hambre de Amor. Paty's newfound acclaim allowed her to make the smooth transition into acting. Soon thereafter, Paty earned roles in various telenovelas (soap opera) such as Acapulco, Cuerpo y Alma (1995) and Gente Bien (1997). She received the newcomer of the year award from the Latin American soap opera magazine, TV y Novelas for her portrayal of Lorena on Acapulco, Cuerpo y Alma.

Within a few years, Manterola was a sought after star, acting in several telenovelas such as: Los Angeles de Charlie (Charlie's Angels), Apuesta por un amor (Gamble for Love), and Destilando Amor. She has also done cameo appearances in Ugly Betty, Muchas Muchachas and in La Fea Mas Bella. Manterola was nominated for a TVyNovelas Award for Best Lead Actress for her work on Apuesta por un amor.

While Manterola has received greater acclaim in her native Mexico, she has also had a transnational impact by appearing in American television and films. For instance, she has appeared in HBO's Arli$$, Souvenir (1997), The Hazard City (2000), The Dukes of Hazzard: Hazzard in Hollywood! (2000) and Carman: The Champion (2001).

In her role as Gabriela in the 2000 Dukes of Hazzard TV movie, Manterola demonstrated her bilingual ability as her character was pitted as Bo Duke's (John Schneider) love interest. A few years prior to the movie's release, she had enrolled at the University of California, Los Angeles (UCLA) to study English.

In addition, Manterola had roles on the movies The Singer (2008) and The Perfect Game (2009).

== Garibaldi ==
Garibaldi was a Mexican group of young men and women, wearing a very free version of the traditional charro costume while singing modern version of traditional songs, causing some controversy. The name Garibaldi comes from Plaza Garibaldi in Mexico City where mariachi bands can be found.

The former members, and their current occupations are:

- Katia Llanos, health and fitness coach
- Patricia Manterola, singer/actress/host
- Pilar Montenegro, singer
- Víctor Noriega, actor/ TV anchor
- Luisa Fernanda, radio and television host
- Sergio Mayer, producer of Sólo para Mujeres
- Charly López, restaurateur
- Javier Ortiz, Sólo para Mujeres

== Filmography ==
=== Film ===
| Year | Title | Role | Notes |
|---|---|---|---|
| 2024 | Mejor Viuda que mal acompañada | Nena Dominguez | |
| 2020 | La Nación de las Mariposas | Camelia | |
| 2011 | The King Hector Lavoe | Carmen | |
| 2009 | The Perfect Game | Maria | |
| 2007 | Mi novia está de madre | Virginia | |
| 2001 | Carman: The Champion | Allia Herrera | |
| 2000 | Hyôryû-gai | Lucia | |
| 1993 | Dónde quedó la bolita | Paty | |

=== Television ===
| Year | Title | Role | Notes |
|---|---|---|---|
| 2023 | Casados a primera vista | Host | Host |
| 2023 | Secretos de las Indomables | Herself | Main role |
| 2021 | Mira Quien Baila | Herself | Judge |
| 2020 | El domo del dinero | Herself | VIP guest |
| 2019 | ¿Quién es la máscara? | Herself | Lechuza |
| 2019 | The World's Best | Herself | International Judge |
| 2018 | Señora Acero | Nancy Salas | Series regular (season 5); 27 episodes |
| 2017–present | Renta congelada | Delia | Main role |
| 2017 | Siempre Niños | Herself | Host |
| 2016 | La Voz Kids | Herself | Host |
| 2010 | El cartel 2, la guerra total | Andrea Negrete | Co-star |
| 2010 | Gritos de muerte y libertad | Mujer Morena | "La última conjura" (Season 1, Episode 10) |
| 2008 | Latin Grammy | Herself | Main Host |
| 2008 | El show de los sueños: Sangre de mi sangre | Herself | Host |
| 2007 | Destilando amor | Erika Robledo | 120 episodes |
| 2006 | Premios lo Nuestro | Herself | Main Host |
| 2006–2007 | Ugly Betty | Dancer / María / María Lorenzo | "Queens for a Day" (Season 1, Episode 1); "In or Out (Season 1, Episode 13); "Brothers" (Season 1, Episode 15) |
| 2006 | La fea más bella | Patricia | |
| 2005 | Apuesta por un amor | Julia Montaño "La Potra" | Main role |
| 2004 | Acapulco fest 2004 | Herself | Host |
| 2001 | Great Performances | Herself | "Alessandro Safina in Concert: Only You" (Season 30, Episode 4) |
| 2001 | Arli$$ | Carman Caballo | "Setting Precedents" (Season 6, Episode 1) |
| 2000 | The Dukes of Hazzard: Hazzard in Hollywood | Gabriela | Television film |
| 1999–2001 | Ángeles | Adriana Vega | "Tragicamente a la moda" (Season 1, Episode 1); "Fantasmas en el atardecer" (Season 1, Episode 5) |
| 1997 | Gente bien | María Figueroa | 89 episodes |
| 1996 | Mujer, casos de la vida real | | Episode: "Quiero ser estrella" |
| 1995–1996 | Acapulco, cuerpo y alma | Lorena | Main role |
| 1991 | Alcanzar una estrella II | | |
| 1989 | Papá soltero | | Episode: "Operación cupido"; Episode: "Operación cupido: Segunda parte" |

=== As producer ===
| Year | Title | Role | Notes |
|---|---|---|---|
| 2001 | Great Performances | Co-producer | "Alessandro Safina in Concert: Only You" (Season 30, Episode 4) |

=== Theater ===
| Year | Title | Role |
|---|---|---|
| 2021 | Sie7e | Ira |
| 2019 | Monologos de la Vagina | ⎯⎯ |
| 2019 | Divinas | — |
| 1998 | Una Pareja en Aprietos | — |
| 1979 | Anita la huerfanita | Huerfana |

== Discography ==
Studio albums and singles

- Bla Bla Bla featuring Mariana Seoane & Akira (2023)
- Fiesta Fiesta (2022)
- Para levantarme del suelo featuring Raymix- single (2022)
- Como la Marea – single (2021)
- Made in Heaven - single (2021)
- Canción Pa' Levantarte - single (2020)
- A Romper la Noche- single (2020)
- Devórame otra vez - single (2019)
- Leyenda – single (2019)
- Devórame otra vez – single (2019)
- Sin ti otra vez – single (2018)
- Pour some sugar on me – single (2017)
- Money talks – single (2017)
- Sweet child of mine – single (2017)
- Alalaleo – EP (2016)
- Ya Terminé (2010)
- A Mis Reinas (2006)
- Déjame Volar (2003)
- Que El Ritmo No Pare (2002)
- Quiero Más (1998)
- Niña Bonita (1996)
- Hambre de Amor (1994)

== Activism ==
Manterola has also been a noted defender of animal rights. On her personal website, Manterola declared: "Hasta los animales más exóticos merecen vivir en libertad" ("Even the most exotic animals deserve to live in freedom"). As such, in 2001 she posed nude on behalf of People for the Ethical Treatment of Animals (PETA). In 2004, she protested Kentucky Fried Chicken's treatment of chickens and urged the multimillion-dollar corporation to adhere to a kinder, gentler methodology. Manterola has also advocated on behalf of the monarch butterflies that migrate from Alaska to the Mexican state of Michoacán. She donated personal jewelry which was sold at auction to further the cause.

Manterola's altruism is not solely restricted to animal rights and the environment. In January 2006, she personally donated 1,500 toys for the children of the Delegacion Miguel Hidalgo in Chapultepec. "No hay con qué pagar la sonrisa de un niño," Manterola said. ("A child's smile is priceless.") In 2007, Patricia joined the Baja Una Estrella Foundation to help in the development of education, health, and social development for poor communities in Mexico.

== Designing career ==
In 2004, Manterola planned to open a business in the Mexican city of Puebla, launching her own line of jeans, "B-good", suitable for everybody.

== Commercials ==
- Crece (2021)
- Stop (2007)
- Maseca (2006) (Mundial)
- Head & Shoulders (2005)
- Dr Pepper (2003) with Ana Gabriel
- Bally Total Fitness (2003)
- Miller Lite (2001)
- Mervyn's California (1998)
- Andrea Boots (1997–2002)
- Sabritas (1996)
- PepsiCo (1995–1997)
