= Now There's 3 of Us? Sí, Mi Amor. =

- Theatrical release poster
- Directed by: Pedro Flores Maldonado
- Written by: Pedro Flores Maldonado; Yiddá Eslava
- Produced by: Julián Zucchi
- Starring: Yiddá Eslava; Julián Zucchi
- Cinematography: Luis Hidalgo
- Music by: Mariano Barrella
- Production company: Wallaz Producciones
- Distributed by: Cinecolor Films Perú
- Release date: January 25, 2024
- Running time: 100 minutes
- Country: Peru
- Languages: Spanish; English

Now There's 3 of Us? Sí, Mi Amor. (Spanish: ¿Ahora somos 3? Sí, mi amor, lit. 'Are we 3 now? Yes, my love') is a 2024 Peruvian romantic comedy film directed by Pedro Flores Maldonado and written by Maldonado and Yiddá Eslava. It is the third and final part of the Sí, mi amor trilogy. It stars Yiddá Eslava and Julián Zucchi accompanied by Nancy Cavagnari, Saskia Bernaola, Pietro Sibille, Andrés Salas, Patricia Portocarrero, Santiago Suarez, Renzo Schuller, Rodrigo Sánchez Patiño, Mayra Olivera and Eric Varias. It premiered on January 25, 2024, in Peruvian theaters.

== Synopsis ==
Guille and Bea are about to become parents, but the unexpected return of a distant mother-in-law will completely alter their plans. With secrets coming to light and old wounds resurfacing, the charismatic couple will face the biggest challenge of their lives. Will they be able to find peace of mind in the midst of this new obstacle?

== Cast ==
- Yiddá Eslava as Bea
- Julián Zucchi as Guille
- Nancy Cavagnari as Bea's mom
- Saskia Bernaola as Marisol
- Pietro Sibille as Alejandro
- Andrés Salas as Max
- Patricia Portocarrero as Regina
- Santiago Suarez as Checo
- Renzo Schuller
- Rodrigo Sánchez Patiño
- Mayra Olivera as Allison
- Eric Varias as Facundo

== Production ==
Principal photography began on May 29, 2023, and ended on June 19 of the same year in Peru.
