= Déjame Volar =

Déjame volar

Studio album by Patricia Manterola
- Released: June 9, 2003
- Genre: Latin pop
- Label: Ariola

Patricia Manterola chronology
Que El Ritmo No Pare (2002)	Déjame volar (2003)	A Mis Reinas (2006)

Singles from Déjame Volar
- 1. "Quédate Conmigo"; 2. "Si Te Besara"; 3. "Me Provoca"

Déjame Volar (Let Me Fly) is the fifth album by the Mexican singer Patricia Manterola.

== Track listing ==
No.	Title	Length
1.	"Te quiero todo para mí"	3:37
2.	"La bomba"	3:54
3.	"Déjame volar"	4:33
4.	"Quédate conmigo"	3:48
5.	"Me provoca"	3:42
6.	"Si te besara"	4:02
7.	"Me condenas"	4:02
8.	"Amor en libertad"	3:25
9.	"Espejismos"	3:50
10.	"Ángel (featuring DJ Bobo)"	3:23
11.	"Shake Your Body Aka La bomba"	3:53
12.	"I Believe (featuring DJ Bobo)"	3:40
