= Romulo & Julita =

Rómulo y Julita
- Theatrical release poster
- Directed by: Daniel Martín Rodríguez
- Written by: Gonzalo Rodríguez Risco; Pablo Carrillo
- Based on: Romeo and Juliet by William Shakespeare
- Produced by: Kike GarcÍa; Daniel Martín Rodríguez
- Starring: Mónica Sánchez; Miguel Iza Deza; Pietro Sibille; Mayella Lloclla
- Cinematography: César Fe
- Edited by: José Luis Membrillo; Sandro Ventura
- Music by: Carlos Flores; Giovanni Rossi Arata; Jorge ¨Awelo¨Miranda
- Production company: La Pepa
- Release date: February 27, 2020
- Running time: 92 minutes
- Country: Peru
- Language: Spanish

Romulo & Julita (Spanish: Rómulo y Julita) is a 2020 Peruvian romantic comedy film directed by Daniel Martín Rodríguez. The film starring Mónica Sánchez and Miguel Iza. It's inspired by the story of Romeo and Juliet by William Shakespeare, and is Rodríguez's second film

== Plot ==
The classic impossible love story of Romeo and Juliet, in the middle of a war between two motorcycle taxi companies in the picturesque town of Berona.

== Cast ==
The cast is composed of:

- Mónica Sánchez as Julita Capullito
- Miguel Iza as Rómulo Monitor
- Mayella Lloclla as Mercuria Monitor
- Pietro Sibille as Teo Capullito
- Ana Cecilia Natteri as Katiuska
- Franco Cabrera as Carioca Monitor
- César Ritter as Father Lautaro
- Anahí de Cárdenas as María del Carmen
- Jesús Neyra as José Ignacio
- Jessica Newton
- Emilram Cossío as Benito Monitor
- Dante of the Eagle as Royer
- Gabriel Iglesias
- Herbert Corimanya as "Cat Chest" Capuillto
- Andrea Luna as Magdalena
- Tommy Parraga as Alex
- Jorge Bardales as Caremalo Monitor
- Zoe Arevalo as Juliet
- Cindy Diaz as Clarita
- Julia Thays as Susanna
- Bruno Pinasco

== Production ==
The film is shot in two weeks in Lima y Canta, and is Sánchez's first leading film role. It is written by Gonzalo Rodríguez Risco and Pablo Carrillo.

It was released on February 27, 2020.
