= Two Sleepy People (film) =

2025 American independent film

- Theatrical poster
- Directed by: Baron Ryan
- Written by: Caroline Grossman; Baron Ryan
- Produced by: David Lawson Jr.; Grant McFadden; Max Reisinger; Mitch Roberts
- Starring: Baron Ryan; Caroline Grossman; Sarah J. Bartholomew; Josh Czuba; Jonathan Flanders
- Cinematography: JT Clemente; Ethan Tran
- Edited by: Justin Shen; Ethan Tran
- Production company: Camp Studios
- Release dates: April 26, 2025 (Camp Film Fest); October 25, 2025 (National Theatrical Tour); November 14, 2025 (U.S.)
- Country: United States

Two Sleepy People is a 2025 American independent romantic comedy drama film directed by Baron Ryan in his feature directorial debut. Co-written by Ryan and Caroline Grossman, the film stars Ryan and Grossman as co-workers who begin to share the same dream that they are a married couple.

It is the debut feature produced by Camp Studios, an Austin-based collective of content creators, and was written and produced over 100 days on a budget of $100,000.

== Premise ==
From the YouTube description of the official trailer:

Two Sleepy People is a story about two coworkers who, after taking a new line of melatonin gummies, are trapped in the same dream every night.

== Cast ==
- Baron Ryan as Syd
- Caroline Grossman as Lucy
- Sarah J. Bartholomew as Donna
- Josh Czuba as Josh
- Jonathan Flanders as Manager Craig

== Production ==
Two Sleepy People is the debut feature produced by Camp Studios, the production arm of Creator Camp, an Austin, Texas-based collective of content creators. In 2025, Creator Camp partnered with Patreon to run a scheme where ten creators were given money and support to produce their own films. American filmmaker and content creator Baron Ryan was selected as part of the scheme.

The film was written and produced in 100 days on a budget of $100,000. It was written within 12 days by Ryan and Caroline Grossman. It is Ryan's feature directorial debut.

== Release ==
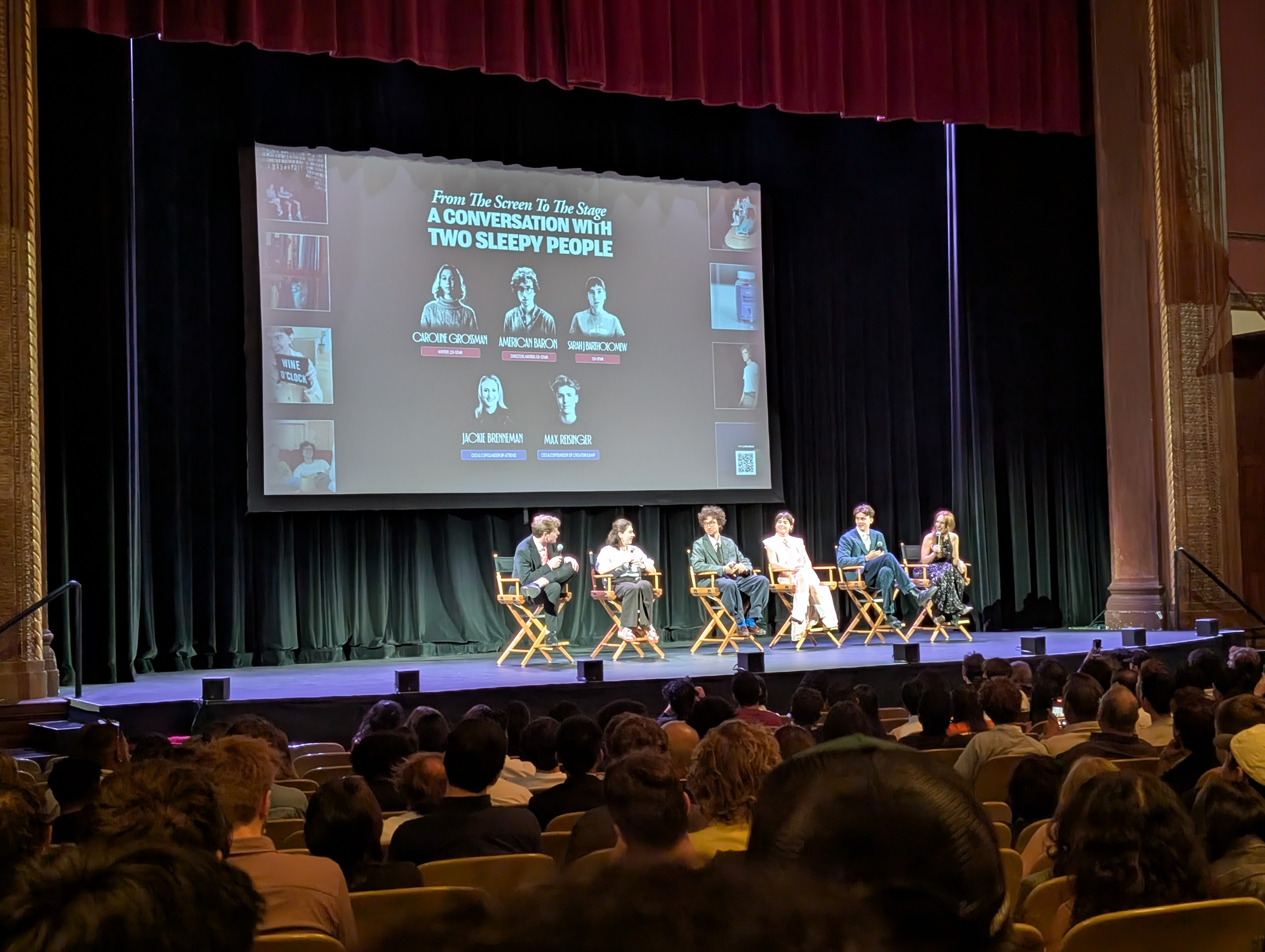
Q&A following the Los Angeles premiere of Two Sleepy People on October 29, 2025.

Two Sleepy People premiered at the Paramount Theater in Austin on April 26, 2025, as part of the Camp Film Fest. (Note: Attributed to multiple sources)

Two Sleepy People's national theatrical tour began on October 25, 2025 in Seattle, with subsequent stops in San Francisco, Los Angeles and New York. Ryan noted that one screening led to four couples breaking up. Viewers could vote to bring screenings of the film to their city.

Via a deal with Attend Theatrical Marketplace, Two Sleepy People gained a wide release, opening November 14 in twenty markets. It was part of a three film deal. Subsequently, the crowdfunding company Kickstarter supported a wider theatrical release for the film. Its nationwide release opened on January 23, 2026.

In May 2026, mk2 alt acquired European distribution rights.
