= Niña Bonita (album) =

Studio album by Patricia Manterola
- Released: May 22, 1996
- Genre: Latin pop
- Label: Fonovisa

Patricia Manterola chronology
Hambre de Amor (1994)	Niña Bonita (1996)	Quiero Más (1998)

Singles from Niña Bonita
- 1. "Niña Bonita"; 2. "Hablando Con Las Estrellas"; 3. "Será Por Ti"

Niña Bonita (Pretty Girl) is the second album by the Mexican singer Patricia Manterola.

== Track listing ==
No.	Title	Length
1.	"Niña bonita"	4:23
2.	"Será por ti"	3:27
3.	"Olor de amor"	3:25
4.	"Amarrada"	4:01
5.	"Cuando llama el corazón"	3:21
6.	"Hablando con las estrellas"	3:21
7.	"Por influjo lunar"	3:28
8.	"De niña a mujer"	4:30
9.	"El último"	3:45
10.	"Dudas"	3:56
