= Hambre de Amor =

Studio album by Patricia Manterola
- Released: April 15, 1994
- Genre: Latin pop
- Label: Fonovisa
- Producer: J.R. Florez

Patricia Manterola chronology
Hambre de Amor (1994)	Niña Bonita (1996)

Singles from Hambre de Amor
- 1. "Quiero"; 2. "Lo Juro"; 3. "Ni Caso"

Hambre de Amor (Hungry of Love) is the first album by the Mexican singer Patricia Manterola, released in 1994.

== Track listing ==
1. Lo Juro
2. Ni Caso
3. Hambre de Amor
4. Quiero
5. Regálame Una Rosa
6. Acuérdate De Mí
7. Mi Religión Eres Tú
8. Eclipse De Amor
9. Quien No Trabaja No Hace El Amor
10. Vuelo Donde Me Lleva El Corazón
