= Italian Mafia DJ =

Italian DJ and music producer

Italian Mafia Dj
- Born: Emanuele Marzolini
- Origin: Rome, Italy
- Genres: Trance, house, acoustic
- Occupations: DJ, producer
- Years active: 2007–present
- Labels: Milk, Sensational
- Website: milk-records.com

Emanuele Marzolini, known as Italian Mafia Dj and also as Domino, is an Italian DJ, musician and electronic dance music producer, born on 13 August 1984 in Rome, Italy. Marzolini is the A&R Manager of TRC Sensational Records since 2006, and label manager of Milk Records since 2010.

== Musical career ==
His first track "Japan", released on Sensational Records in 2007 received strong support by numerous international TOP DJs and quickly gained him reputation as one of the most promising Italian DJ acts.

In 2008 Marzolini collaborated for the first time with English singer/songwriter Tiff Lacey. Their track "I Loved You Good" (TRC – Sensational Records) was released on 31 January 2009, becoming a Top 20 seller at the Juno Store in the United Kingdom and being released also on vinyl.

Under his alias Domino, Marzolini had released two techno house tracks, "I will rock you" on Southern Fried Records, (Fatboy Slim's own label), and "Not sure about logic anymore" on US label Star 69 Records.

At the end of 2010 Marzolini started managing his own label named Milk Records. The first release on it was Maltese DJ N'Heaven's track "Rampage" and the second one was his own track as Italian Mafia Dj – "Hold Me Now" with Tiff Lacey – a follow-up to their classic "I Loved You Good".

2012 saw him releasing his Progressive Trance single "332" and remixing a few of Milk Records' releases.

His first 2013 single is called "Hey Robot". At the moment he's working on further new tracks.

== Discography ==
- Singles:
  - Italian Mafia Dj – "Japan" (Sensational Records) (2007)
  - Italian Mafia Dj & Tiff Lacey – "I Loved You Good" (Sensational Records) (2009)
  - Italian Mafia Dj & Mr. Gain – "Dark Rooms" (Sensational Records) (2010)
  - Italian Mafia Dj & Tiff Lacey – "Hold Me Now" (Milk Records) (2011)
  - Italian Mafia Dj feat. Anthya – "Dream" (Vandit Records) (2011)
  - Domino – "I Will Rock You" (Southern Fried Records) (2011)
  - Domino – "Not Sure About Logic Anymore" (Star 69 Records)( 2011)
  - Italian Mafia Dj – "332" (Milk Records) (2012)
  - Italian Mafia Dj – "Hey Robot" (Milk Records) (2013)
  - Italian Mafia Dj feat. Solnce – "In The Water"(Milk Records) (2013)
- Remixes:
  - N'Heaven – "Rampage" (Italian Mafia Dj Acoustic Mix) (Milk Records) (2011)
  - Andrea Ribeca feat. Ofelia – "Right In Your Heart" (Italian Mafia Dj Instrumental Remix) (Milk Records) (2011)
  - N'Heaven feat. Emma Lock – "Destiny" (Italian Mafia Dj Acoustic Mix) (Milk Records) (2011)
  - Andrea Ribeca feat. Anthya – "Always In Paradise" (Italian Mafia Dj Acoustic Vocal Remix) (Milk Records) (2012)
  - Tod Allen – "Loveable" (Italian Mafia Dj Remix) (Milk Records) (2013)
  - Anton Arbuzov – "Never Alone" (Italian Mafia DJ Remix)(Milk Records) (2013)
  - Tod Allen feat. Denis Commie – "I am a Dreamer" (Italian Mafia Dj Remix )(Milk Records) (2013)
