= Sí, mi amor (film) =

- Theatrical release poster
- Directed by: Pedro Flores Maldonado
- Written by: Pedro Flores Maldonado; Yiddá Eslava
- Produced by: Yiddá Eslava; Julián Zucchi
- Starring: Yiddá Eslava; Julián Zucchi; Andrés Salas; Magdyel Ugaz; Pietro Sibille
- Cinematography: Luis Hidalgo
- Edited by: Alberto Ponce
- Music by: Christian Ames Aranda
- Production company: Wallaz Producciones
- Release date: January 23, 2020
- Running time: 100 minutes
- Country: Peru
- Language: Spanish

Sí, mi amor (lit. 'Yes, my love') is a 2020 Peruvian romantic comedy film directed by Pedro Flores Maldonado (in his directorial debut) and written by Maldonado & Yiddá Eslava.

== Synopsis ==
A shocked boyfriend faces a fidelity test after his partner ends the relationship, as he strongly suspects that he is cheating on her. It is a story of love conflicts, a plot that has as protagonists a couple of boyfriends who are destabilized by social pressure, jealousy and mistrust. They will try to start from scratch and with new partners, but how much can you run from your true feelings?

== Cast ==
The actors participating in this film are:

- Yiddá Eslava as Bea
- Julián Zucchi as Guille
- Andrés Salas as Max
- Magdyel Ugaz as Ceci
- Pietro Sibille as Alejandro
- Saskia Bernaola as Marisol
- Sebastián Monteghirfo as Horacio
- Mayra Couto as Avril
- Santiago Suárez as Checo
- Ximena Palomino as Britany

== Release ==
The film premiered on January 23, 2020 in Peruvian theaters. Then it was acquired by Netflix and premiered on May 6 of the same year.

== Reception ==
The film brought in 33,000 viewers on its first day, and 30,000 on its second day. It ended its first weekend with more than 150,000 viewers, to finish with more than 350,000.

== Sequel ==
In 2021, a sequel titled Let's Tie the Knot, Honey! was announced, premiering on February 3, 2022 in Peruvian theaters.
