= Acuérdate de mí (film) =

- Theatrical release poster
- Directed by: Sebastián García
- Written by: Sebastián García
- Produced by: Sebastián García
- Starring: Alec Chaparro; Liz Navarro
- Cinematography: Cassiel Pachacutek García
- Edited by: Eros Alvarado
- Music by: Fabricio Mori
- Distributed by: Star Films
- Release dates: October 2022 (FECIT); 14 February 2024 (Peru)
- Country: Peru
- Language: Spanish

Acuérdate de mí (lit. 'Remember me') is a 2022 Peruvian romantic comedy film written, produced and directed by Sebastian García. It stars Alec Chaparro and Liz Navarro accompanied by Karin Morris, Roberto Bedoya, Techi Cornejo and Carlos Vertiz. It is about the romance of two Lima university students who belong to different social classes.

== Synopsis ==
It is a love story between Xavier Miró coming from a wealthy family thanks to his father, a renowned lawyer, and Soledad Quispe, a young woman who lives with her grandparents in the district of Los Olivos. Xavier lives in Miraflores and, following his father's wishes, studies law at the University of Lima. On the other hand, Soledad is a student at the National University of San Marcos, with the aspiration of becoming an outstanding ballet dancer. However, the relationship between the two is threatened by Xavier's father, who opposes his son maintaining a courtship with Soledad, due to social class differences and the fear that he will join someone outside his socioeconomic circle.

== Cast ==
- Alec Chaparro as Xavier Miró
- Liz Navarro as Soledad Quispe
- Carlos Vértiz as Xavier's dad
- Karin Morris as Xavier's mom
- Roberto Bedoya as Soledad's Grandfather
- Techi Cornejo as Soledad's Grandmother
- Cassiel Pachacutek García Aliaga as Xavier's friend 1
- Michael Bryan Lozano Estrella as Xavier's friend 2
- Omar Lengua Suarez as Xavier's friend 3
- Sebastipan Vientosavaje as Xavier's uncle
- Ricardo Amaya as Doctor
- Lucero Lopez as Nurse 1
- Isabel Verastegui as Nurse 2
- Eros Alvarado as Nurse 3
- Walter Carbajal as Footballer 1
- David Contreras as Footballer 2
- Jesús Lopez as Footballer 3
- Renzo Guillén as Footballer 4

== Release ==
Acuérdate de mí had its world premiere in October 2022 at the 9th Trujillo Film Festival. It had its commercial premiere on 14 February 2024, in Peruvian theaters.

== Reception ==
Rodrigo Portales from Cinencuentro negatively criticized the film due to the poor acting of Alec Chaparro, one of the protagonists, who fails to express his feelings and whose voice seems to have been superimposed on the original voice. Furthermore, he criticized the superficiality of the main plot, whose main theme of racism and social problems isn't explored in depth.
