= Dark room (sexuality) =

Darkened room where sexual activity can take place

A dark room or darkroom – also known as a backroom, blackroom, or playroom – is a room, typically at a nightclub, sex club, bathhouse, or adult bookstore, where patrons of the business can engage in relatively discreet sexual activity. Dark rooms usually have little or no lighting, possibly incorporating blacklights or dim, colored lighting to establish an atmosphere of twilight and secrecy.

== Bars ==
Dark rooms were common features of North American gay bars and clubs in the 1960s and 1970s, and can still be found in some bars and sex clubs. A backroom in a gay bar is typically a small, very dark or dimly lit room at the back of the club where customers can go to have sex, usually without undressing. Until the 1980s, backrooms were common in gay bars, and the sex that took place in them was typically unprotected and anonymous. The AIDS epidemic led to the closing of many backrooms in gay bars, and other public sex venues.
