= Pedro Flores Maldonado =

Mexican filmmaker

- Born: 18 December 1984 (age 41); Colima, Mexico
- Education: Instituto Superior de Arte
- Occupations: Film director film producer screenwriter actor
- Notable work: Sí, mi amor ¿Nos casamos? Sí, mi amor Soy inocente ¿Ahora somos 3? Sí, mi amor

Pedro Flores Maldonado (born December 18, 1984) is a Mexican film director, screenwriter, film producer and actor. He is co-founder of Wallaz Producciones where he directed and co-wrote the romantic comedy film series Sí, mi amor (2020–2024). He also directed and co-wrote the comedy mystery film Soy inocente (2023) and psychological horror film The Black Room (2025).

== Biography ==
Pedro Flores Maldonado was born on December 18, 1984, in the city of Colima, Mexico, 8 where he lived until he was seventeen years old, when he settled in Havana, Cuba, to study at the Instituto Superior de Arte (ISA), where he graduated in 2007 with a degree in Performing Arts. After that he moved to Buenos Aires, Argentina, in 2008.

He continued his professional training at the Cinematographic Research Center (CIC) and at the Union of the Argentine Cinematographic Industry (SICA). In 2018 he participated in "Scriptwriting, casting and direction with the kids from the center" and "The day I became strong. Resilience as a driving force", taught by Jan-Willem Built (Holland) and Dr. Maya Götz (Germany) respectively.

== Career ==
In 2009 he premiered Saudade – dance for the dead ones, in collaboration with the artist Clara Lee Lundberg (whom he met in 2003 when they were both studying at the I.S.A art school (Instituto Superior de Arte). With this production the well-known trilogy began. as The Poetics of the Body (Kroppens Poetik).

Starting in 2010, he co-founded the production company Wallaz Producciones, which is based in Buenos Aires, Argentina. With this production company he directed the web series El 202, released in Peru in November 2012. Its debut episode was a trending topic on the social network Twitter (now X).

In 2012 he presented the short film Corpus (2011), the second installment of the trilogy The Poetics of the Body (Kroppens Poetik) at the Gothenburg Danceand Theater Festival 2012, also at the Agite y Sirva Festival 2012 (Puebla, Mexico) and at the DanceWEB Marathon Festival / Impuls Tanz (Vienna, Austria).

In 2015 he ventured into TV as a screenwriter and director, with the premiere on September 6 of the television series Relatos para no corazón on the Peruvian channel Panamericana TV. 16This series was nominated for best production in the 2016 Luces Award, Peru.

On January 23, 2020, Si, mi amor, his first feature film as director and screenwriter, premiered in Peruvian theaters. The film achieved almost 700,000 viewers in its seven weeks in theaters. On May 6 of that same year, it was released worldwide on Netflix, translated into several languages, entering the top ten of the most viewed content in Argentina, Peru, Bolivia, Costa Rica and Ecuador. Furthermore, in countries like Spain and the United States it is a search trend.

On February 3, 2022, after the commercial success of the first film, he directed the sequel ¿Nos casamos? Sí, mi amor, whose script he wrote with Yiddá Eslava. The film attracted 50,000 spectators in its first week, surpassing 200,000 spectators when it left cinemas, being the second highest-grossing Spanish-language film in South America after the reopening of cinemas (2021–2022). On May 3, like the previous film, it was included on Netflix.

On January 19, 2023, he premiered Soy inocente, a film that he directed and co-wrote the script with Yiddá Eslava, who is also the protagonist of the film along with Édgar Vivar, and which has the special participation of the Argentine singer Pablo Ruiz. Soy inocente attracted more than 30,000 viewers in its first weekend, becoming the third best post-pandemic Peruvian premiere. The film was acquired by the VIX Plus platform for the Latin market in the United States and all of Latin America.

== Selected filmography ==
Year	Title	Director	Writer	Notes
2020	Sí, mi amor	Yes	Yes	Feature film
2022	Let's Tie the Knot, Honey!	Yes	Yes	Feature film
2023	Soy inocente	Yes	Yes	Feature film
2024	Now There's 3 of Us? Sí, Mi Amor.	Yes	Yes	Feature film
2025	The Black Room	Yes	Yes	Feature film
