= Pietro Sibille =

Peruvian actor

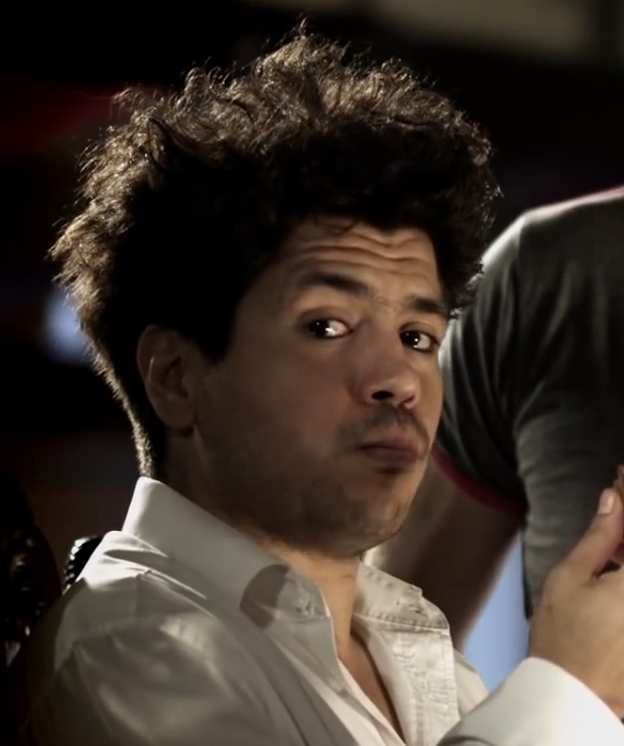
Pietro Sibille

Pietro Sibille Eslava (born 20 April 1977 in Lima) is a Peruvian actor.

He won recognition with the Peruvian indie film Días de Santiago, playing the role of a Peruvian ex-soldier with big issues. He won the best actor award twice, in 6° Festival Internacional de Cine Independiente de Buenos Aires 2004, and in Festival Elcine Lima 2004.

He played the role of Juaco in the film Proof of Life, with Meg Ryan and Russell Crowe in the principal roles.

In Peruvian television, he played the main character of "Misterio", a social drama serial based on the life of a real soccer fanatic. His next role was as Zacarías, a homeless man in "Lobos de Mar", an action/crime series. His latest role was Mandril, another ex-soldier with family issues, in another crime series and movie called La Gran Sangre.

He played the role of Jano in Pasajeros, a film directed by Andrés Cotler.
