= El Artista del Año season 3 =

El Artista del Año
- Season 3
- Winner: Daniela Darcourt & Pedro Loli

Release
- Original network: América Televisión
- Original release: September 29 – December 8, 2018

Season chronology
- ← Previous; Season 2 Next → Season 4

Season three of El Artista del Año, titled El artista del año: El dúo perfecto, premiered on September 29, 2018, on the América Televisión network.

This season brings together former contestants from the previous two seasons and new participants who compete in couples throughout the competition. On October 27, the live show was canceled due to technical problems, so the fifth week will be held next Saturday.

== Cast ==
=== Contestants ===
The cast is made up of the former contestants of the first season, Luis Baca, Rossana Fernández-Maldonado, Pedro Loli, Micheille Soifer and Cielo Torres, along with the former contestants of the second season, Kevin Blow, Daniela Darcourt, Mirella Paz, Jonathan Rojas and Shantall Young Oneto. In addition, four new competitors entered, Amy Gutiérrez, Vernis Hernández, Stephanie Orúe and Manolo Rojas, giving a total of fourteen contestants. With a total of fourteen contestants, seven couples are the participants. During the first two weeks, the three couples with the highest score continued together while the other four were exchanged with each other. Finally, in the third week, the judges decided the formation of the duos based on the performances made up to that moment.

Contestant	Notability (known for)	Status	Ref.
Luis Baca	Actor & singer	Participating	
Jonathan Rojas	Cumbia singer	Participating	
Kevin Blow	Reggaeton singer	Participating	
Micheille Soifer	Singer & actress	Participating	
Daniela Darcourt	Salsa singer & dancer	Participating	
Pedro Loli	Cumbia singer	Participating	
Rossana Fernández-Maldonado	Actress, singer & TV host	Participating	
Amy Gutiérrez	Singer	Participating	
Vernis Hernández	Salsa singer & dancer	Participating	
Manolo Rojas	Comedian & TV host	Participating	
Stephanie Orúe	Actress & singer	Participating	
Cielo Torres	Singer & actress	Participating	
Mirella Paz	Model & singer	Participating	
Shantall Young Oneto	R&B singer & actress	Participating	

=== Hosts and judges ===
Gisela Valcárcel and Jaime "Choca" Mandros returned as hosts, while Morella Petrozzi, Lucho Cáceres, Fiorella Rodríguez and Cecilia Bracamonte returned as judges. Santi Lesmes, who served as guest judge in previous seasons, joined the show as the fifth judge.

== Scoring charts ==
Contestant	Place	1	2	3	4	5	6	7
Luis		40	47	40	48	39	45	36
Daniela		45	40	48	53	51	45	52
Rossana		43	43	44	48	50	48	39
Amy		47	47	45	48	50	48	39
Pedro		47	47	45	53	51	45	52
Stephanie		40	45	46	46	49	53	48
Mirella		49	45	52	44	51	45	46
Jonathan		43	47	40	48	39	45	36
Micheille		37	43	46	43	47	36	48
Cielo		45	45	38	46	49	53	48
Shantall		49	45	52	44	51	45	46
Kevin	12	37	40	38	43	47	36	48
Vernis	13	47	44	44	41	44	41	
Manolo	13	47	44	48	41	44	41	

Red numbers indicate the lowest score for each week
Green numbers indicate the highest score for each week
the couple eliminated of the week
the sentenced couple saved in the duel
the sentenced couples who will face each other in the duel

=== Average score chart ===
This table only counts performances scored on a 50-point scale. (Note: To weighted the scores and to work on the same scale, the scores of the guest judges and the extra points were excluded, while the 11 scores were changed to 10.)

Rank by average	Place	Contestant	Total points	Number of performances	Average
1		Pedro	188	4	47.0
2		Amy	187	4	46.8
2		Mirella	187	4	46.8
2		Shantall	187	4	46.8
5		Daniela	182	4	45.5
6		Manolo	180	4	45.0
7		Rossana	178	4	44.5
8		Stephanie	177	4	44.3
9		Vernis	176	4	44.0
9		Jonathan	176	4	44.0
11		Cielo	174	4	43.5
12		Luis	173	4	43.3
13		Micheille	169	4	42.3
14		Kevin	158	4	39.5

=== Higher and lower scores ===
This table has the highest and lowest scores of each contestants performance according to the 50-point scale.

Contestant	Higher score(s)	Lower score(s)
Luis	Reggaeton (47)	Merengue & Rock and roll (40)
Jonathan	Reggaeton (47)	Rock and roll (40)
Kevin	Rock and roll (43)	Reggaeton (37)
Micheille	Tango (46)	Reggaeton (37)
Daniela	Ballad (49)	Salsa (40)
Pedro	Ballad (49)	Pop (45)
Rossana	Ballad (48)	Latin pop & Reggaeton (43)
Amy	Ballad (48)	Pop (45)
Vernis	Cumbia (47)	Latin pop (41)
Manolo	Pop (48)	Latin pop (41)
Stephanie	Tango & Ballad (46)	Merengue (40)
Cielo	Ballad (46)	Pop (38)
Mirella	R&B & Pop (49)	Salsa (44)
Shantall	R&B & Pop (49)	Salsa (44)

== Weekly scores ==
Individual judges' scores in the charts below (given in parentheses) are listed in this order from left to right: Morella Petrozzi, Lucho Cáceres, Fiorella Rodríguez, Santi Lesmes, Cecilia Bracamonte.

=== Week 1: Premiere Night ===
The couples interpreted different musical genres.

Running order

Couple	Scores	Genre	Music	Result
Daniela & Cielo	45 (9, 9, 9, 9, 9)	Latin pop	"La Bikina"—Luis Miguel	Separated
Amy & Pedro	47 (9, 9, 10, 9, 10)	Reggaeton	"Despacito" / "Échame la Culpa"—Luis Fonsi & Daddy Yankee / Demi Lovato	Remain
Vernis & Manolo	47 (10, 10, 9, 9, 9)	Cumbia	"La Pollera Colorá"—Charlie Zaa / Yuri	Remain
Rossana & Jonathan	43 (8, 8, 9, 8, 10)	Latin pop	"Decídete" / "Ahora Te Puedes Marchar"—Luis Miguel	Separated
Kevin & Micheille	37 (7, 7, 7, 8, 8)	Reggaeton	"Chantaje"—Shakira & Maluma	Separated
Mirella & Shantall	49 (10, 10, 10, 9, 10)	R&B	"Lady Marmalade"—Christina Aguilera, Lil' Kim, P!nk & Mýa	Remain
Luis & Stephanie	40 (8, 8, 8, 8, 8)	Merengue	"Visa para un Sueño" / "La Bilirrubina"—Juan Luis Guerra	Separated

=== Week 2: Party Night ===
Running order

Couple	Scores	Genre	Music	Result
Mirella & Shantall	45 (9, 9, 9, 9, 9)	Merengue	«La Loba»—Miriam Cruz / «El Negro No Puede»—Las Chicas del Can	Remain
Vernis & Manolo	44 (10, 10, 9, 7, 8)	Nueva ola	«Parece Que Va a Llover» / «Lamento Borincano» / «Quiero Amanecer»—Rulli Rendo	Separated
Stephanie & Cielo	45 (9, 9, 9, 9, 9)	Salsa	«Mi Tierra»—Gloria Estefan	Separated
Amy & Pedro	47 (10, 9, 10, 8, 10)	Salsa	«Escapémonos»—Marc Anthony & Jennifer Lopez	Remain
Rossana & Micheille	43 (9, 8, 9, 8, 9)	Reggaeton	«Sin Pijama»—Becky G & Natti Natasha	Separated
Kevin & Daniela	40 (8, 8, 8, 7, 9)	Salsa	«Muévete»—DLG	Separated
Luis & Jonathan	47 (10, 9, 9, 9, 10)	Reggaeton	«Reggaetón Lento (Bailemos)»—CNCO	Remain

=== Week 3: Movie Night ===
Running order

Couple	Scores	Genre	Music	Result
Luis & Jonathan	40 (8, 8, 8, 8, 8)	Rock and roll	«La Bamba»—from La Bamba	Separated
Rossana & Vernis	44 (9, 8, 9, 9, 9)	Disco	«Chiquitita» / «Mamma Mia» / «Voulez-Vous»—from Mamma Mia!	Separated
Kevin & Cielo	38 (7, 7, 8, 8, 8)	Pop	«You're the One That I Want» / «We Go Together»—from Grease	Separated
Daniela & Manolo	48 (10, 10, 10, 8, 10)	Pop	«Mañana» / «Ya No Aguanto Más»—from Annie	Separated
Stephanie & Micheille	46 (10, 9, 9, 9, 9)	Tango	«Cell Block Tango»—from Chicago	Separated
Mirella & Shantall	52 (11, 11, 10, 9, 11)	Pop	«I Will Follow Him»—from Sister Act	Remain
Amy & Pedro	45 (9, 9, 9, 9, 9)	Pop	«(I've Had) The Time of My Life»—from Dirty Dancing	Separated

=== Week 4: Famous Duets Night ===
Running order

Couple	Scores	Genre	Music	Result
Rossana & Amy	48 (10, 10, 9, 9, 10)	Ballad	«Perdón, Perdón»—Ha*Ash	Safe
Luis & Jonathan	47 (11, 9, 9, 9, 9)	Reggaeton	«Mi Niña Bonita» / «Andas en Mi Cabeza»—Chino & Nacho	Safe
Stephanie & Cielo	46 (10, 9, 9, 9, 9)	Ballad	«Cosas del Amor»—Ana Gabriel & Vikki Carr	Safe
Vernis & Manolo	41 (9, 8, 8, 7, 9)	Latin pop	«Déjame Vivir»—Rocío Dúrcal & Juan Gabriel	Sentenced
Daniela & Pedro	52 (11, 10, 11, 9, 11)	Ballad	«Vivo por Ella»—Andrea Bocelli & Marta Sánchez	Safe
Kevin & Micheille	43 (9, 8, 8, 8, 10)	Rock and roll	«Esa Chica y Yo»—Pimpinela	Sentenced
Mirella & Shantall	44 (9, 9, 9, 8, 9)	Salsa	«Burundanga»—Celia Cruz & Lola Flores / «Solo Se Vive Una Vez»— Azúcar Moreno	Safe
Luis & Jonathan; Kevin & Micheille; Daniela & Pedro; Rossana & Amy; Vernis & Manolo; Stephanie & Cielo; Mirella & Shantall	1 1	Punta	«Fiesta»—Banda Blanca	
