= Milena Warthon =

Peruvian singer-songwriter (born 2000)

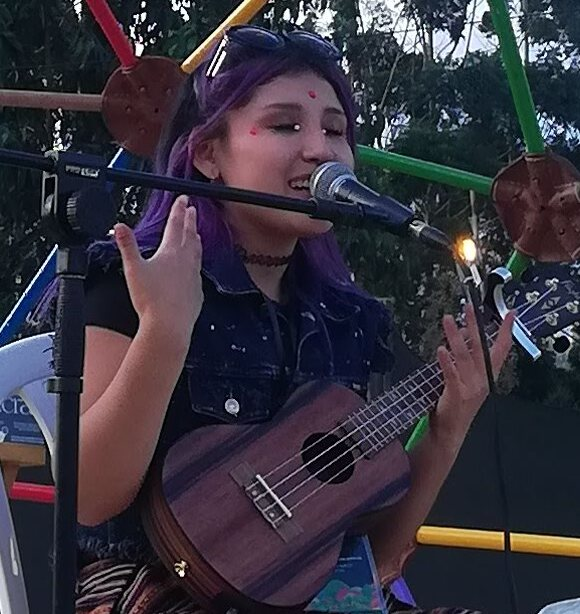
- Warthon at a 2022 music festival

Background information
- Born: Milena Victoria Warthon Tamariz; 21 March 2000 (age 26); Lima, Peru
- Genres: Pop; Andean
- Occupation: Singer-songwriter
- Years active: 2018–present
- Website: www.milenawarthon.com

Milena Victoria Warthon Tamariz (born 21 March 2000) is a Peruvian singer-songwriter. She is known for fusing pop and Andean music, creating the pop andino (Andean pop) genre. In 2023, she won the folclórico ("folk") category of the Viña del Mar International Song Festival with her song "Warmisitay".

== Early life ==
Warthon was born in Lima, Peru, on 21 March 2000, to a mother from Ancash and a father from Apurímac. She was raised in Lima and grew up listening to huayno music because her parents are from the countryside; she identifies as an Andean woman. She has cited her maternal grandmother, who was an amateur singer, as inspiration for her early career. At age eight, Warthon performed "What I've Been Looking For" from High School Musical at her school; she says she gained confidence in her abilities after this performance. At age 13, she began taking singing classes. At age 15, she completed school and enrolled at the University of Lima to study music, but she later changed her course of study to communication.

== Career ==
=== 2019–2021: Beginnings ===
After being inspired by one of her classmates, Warthon's parents helped connect her with a producer and vocal coach and she began posting covers. In February 2018, Warthon released her first cover: "Tú y yo" by Gian Marco. In June 2018, she performed reggae–huayno fusion songs on the music competition series Los Cuatro Finalistas; she received positive comments but did not reach the final. In July 2018, she uploaded a remix of her "Tú y yo" cover with Max Castro.

Throughout the following year, Warthon released several singles, including covers and original songs. Some of these singles were "Poco a poco", "Ésta soy yo", "Me niego". In December 2019, she released her first EP "Déjame contarte". In July 2020, Warthon started posting videos on TikTok, and by the end of the year, she had accrued about 100,000 followers.

In February 2021, Warthon released a single, "Agua de Mar". The song reached #1 on Spotify's "Viral 50 – Peru" playlist. Also in 2021, she appeared on the music competition series La Voz Perú. On 28 July 2021, Warthon released "Mashup Peruano", a mashup of five Peruvian songs, in celebration of 200 years of Peruvian independence.

=== 2022–present: Pop Andino and Latinchola ===
On 6 May 2022, Warthon released the single "Warmisitay", with a music video filmed in Yungay, Ancash. The song's title comes from a fusion of Quechua and Spanish and roughly translates to "(my) little young woman". She wrote the song as an homage to her grandmother. In February 2023, Warthon won the "gaviota de plata" ("silver seagull") at the Viña del Mar International Song Festival for her performance of "Warmisitay" in the folk competition.

In 2023, Warthon released her debut album, Pop Andino. To celebrate the album's release, she organized a premiere with a red carpet attended by local celebrities and influencers. The album consists of 15 songs in which Warthon narrates her childhood, dreams, fears, and family roots. It features her grandmother, Teresita, as a narrator. The album includes collaborations with artists Eva Ayllón, Renata Flores, Amanda Portales, and the Bolivian group Chila Jatun.

In May 2024, Warthon and Peruvian DJ Kayfex released the song "Amarre", with a music video filmed on Taquile Island.

In May 2025, Warthon released the single "Latinchola", which she described as a "declaration of pride and resistance". In July 2025, at the Lima International Book Fair, Warthon announced the publication of her first children's book, Latinchola. At the book fair, she also debuted the song "Wayta"; the song's title means "flower" in Quechua. In August 2025, Warthon presented the Milena Warthon Sinfónico concert at the Gran Teatro Nacional. At the concert, she also performed alongside special guests including Peruvian group Los Mirlos and Chilean singer Américo. On October 24, 2025, Warthon released her second album, titled Latinchola.

== Musical style ==
Warthon's music is in the pop andino genre, a fusion of pop and Andean music. She coined the term. She has described her fusion music project as experimental in its early stages; she tried incorporating different genres into her music, including rock, reggae, reggaeton, criolla, and pop.

Among her influences, she has cited North American pop, Spanish-language pop, cumbia, Peruvian music, and Andean music. She has cited Soledad Pastorutti as an influence in her fusion style, and said that she admires the work of Andean composer Pelo d'Ambrosio.

== Credits ==
=== Theatre ===
| Year | Title | Role | Notes | Ref. |
|---|---|---|---|---|
| 2022 | Lamentos (Regrets) | La Joven (The Youth) | Lead role | |

=== Television ===
| Year | Title | Role | Broadcast | Ref. |
|---|---|---|---|---|
| 2018 | Los cuatro finalistas (The four finalists) | Contestant | Latina Televisión | |
| 2021 | La voz Perú (The voice Peru) | Participant (Quarter finalist) | Latina Televisión | |
| 2022 | El artista del año (The artist of the year) | Contestant | América Televisión | |
| 2022 | El artista del año (The artist of the year) | Guest (Christmas Special) | América Televisión | |
| 2022 | La voz Kids (The voice Kids) | Co-coach for the Maricarmen Marin team | Latina Televisión | |
| 2023 | Teletón 2023 (Telethon 2023) | Special guest | | |

=== Short films ===
| Year | Title | Role | Notes | Ref. |
|---|---|---|---|---|
| 2023 | Protegiendo los sueños de Sol (Protecting Sol's dreams) | Sol Segura | Lead role | |

== Awards and nominations ==
| Year | Competition | Country | Category | Work | Result | Ref. |
| 2023 | LXII Festival Internacional de la Canción de Viña del Mar (62nd Viña del Mar International Song Festival) | Chile | Folklore Competition | Warmisitay | Won | |
| 2024 | Premios de la Cámara Peruana de la Música (Peruvian Chamber of Music Awards) | Peru | Best young singer-songwriter | Herself | Nominated | |

== Discography ==
=== EPs ===
- 2019: Déjame contarte

=== Studio albums ===
- 2023: Pop Andino
- 2025: LATINCHOLA
