= Ethel Pozo =

Peruvian presenter and businessperson

- Born: Ethel Rocío Pozo Valcárcel; 15 December 1980 (age 45); Lima, Peru
- Education: University of Lima (BA)
- Occupations: TV presenter, TV personality, businesswoman
- Spouse: Julián Alexander (2022–present)
- Children: 2
- Parent: Gisela Valcárcel (mother)

Ethel Rocío Pozo Valcárcel (born 15 December 1980) is a Peruvian television presenter, television personality, and businesswoman.

== Biography ==
Pozo is the daughter of television presenter Gisela Valcárcel and Jorge Pozo. Due to her father's absence, Ethel was raised by her great-uncle through Gisela as her paternal figure. She attended her first years in school at San Felipe college (Miraflores) and afterwards at Newton College in Lima. She would later attend the University of Lima, where she graduated with a degree in communications. She later did her post-graduate studies at the same university for Corporate, Identity, and Advertising Communications.

In 2014, Pozo took part in the film Loco cielo de Abril, directed by Sandro Ventura. In 2017, she made her directing debut alongside Yaco Eskenazi, for the TV program Mi mamá cocina mejor que la tuya, which she directed until 2023.

In 2018, she acted alongside her mother in the teleseries De vuelta al barrio, and would later star in the theatrical work Hadas, nunca dejes de soñar. In 2019, she led the special El show después del show with Renzo Schüller, Natalia Salas, and Edson Dávila "Giselo". That same year, she was a part of the movie Papá X Tres and also acted in the theatrical piece Ciudad de fantasía.

In 2020, she was invited to become part of the morning program América hoy, where she returned to working with Dávila and would add on later Janet Barboza, Christian Domínguez and Melissa Paredes, the latter being replaced later by Brunella Horna. In 2021, Pozo released a book titled Nace una madre, ¿Nace la culpa?. In 2022, she began to work with Eskenazi again on the new show by her mothers production company GV Producciones: En esta cocina mando yo.

== Personal life ==
Pozo was married to Fernando Garabán with whom she had two daughters: Doménica and Luana. After they divorced, she had a relationship with actor and comedian Pedro Cabrera from 2014 to 2018.

After they separated, she began a relationship with Julián Alexander, the brother of television producer Michelle Alexander, whom she would later marry on a rural estate in Pachacamac in September 2022. It was a private ceremony with no media presence allowed.

== Other activities ==
Since 2004, Pozo has managed her mother’s businesses such as Amarige Salón y Spa, as well as GV Producciones.

== Filmography ==
=== Television ===
Television
Year	Title	Role	Notes	Ref.
2017–2021; 2023	Mi mamá cocina mejor que la tuya	Herself	Presenter	
2018	Gisela busca... el amor	Herself	Special guest	
2018	El artista del año	Herself	Invited judge (VIP jury)	
2018	El dúo perfecto	Herself	Special guest (El desafío)	
2018	Teletón 2018: Nos falta mucho, nos faltas tú	Herself	Special guest (Gira Teletón)	
2019	El show después del show	Herself	Presenter	
2019	Teletón 2019: De todos, para todos	Herself	Special guest (Gira Teletón)	
2019	El artista del año: Especial de 2019	Herself	Presenter (Special edition)	
2020–presente	América hoy	Herself	Presenter	
2021	La gran noche del año	Herself	Presenter (Special edition)	
2021	Reinas del show 2	Herself	Commentator	
2021	Américlub	Herself	Special guest	
2022	Américlub	Herself	Special guest	
2022–2023	En esta cocina... mando yo	Herself	Presenter	

Series and telenovelas
Year	Title	Role	Notes	Ref.
2018	De vuelta al barrio	Esther Bravo	Special appearance	
2022	Al fondo hay sitio	"Charito"	Television spot	
2022	Luz de luna 2: Canción para dos	Ella misma	Special appearance	
2023	Maricucha 2	"Afrodita"	Recurring role	
2024	Luz de esperanza	Carolina	Special appearance	
2024	Tu nombre y el mío	Perla		

=== Films ===
Films
Year	Title	Role	Notes	Ref.
2014	An Odd Evening in April	Daniela	Main role	
2019	Papá X Tres	Mamá en Paseo	Secondary role	

=== Theatre ===
- Hadas, nunca dejes de soñar (2018; main role)
- Ciudad Fantasia (2019; main role)

=== Literature ===
- Nace una madre, ¿Nace la culpa? (2021)

=== Commercials ===
- Plaza Vea (2022) as part of the commercial for Imagen.
