= Marina Kapoor =

Peruvian singer, actress, and activist for the rights of transgender people

- Marina Quispe Pérez
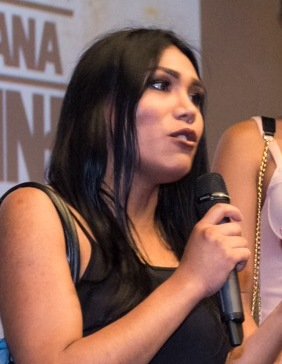
- Marina Kapoor in 2017
- Born: December 23, 1987 (age 38); Lima, Peru
- Occupations: Singer; Actress; Trans rights activist

Marina Kapoor, stage name of Marina Quispe Pérez (born Lima, 23 December 1987), is a Peruvian singer, actress, and activist for the rights of transgender people.

== Biography ==
At 15 years old, Kapoor came out as gay. Four years later, at 19, she came out and transitioned as a trans woman.

At age 19 in 2007 before her transition, she first appeared on television on Trampolín Latino, which she won.

Kapoor is a singer and an actress. Her first role in film was in Sin vagina, me marginan, a 2017 camp film directed by Wesley Verástegui, in which Kapoor played La Microbio, a transgender full-service sex worker. It was one of the first Peruvian films to have two trans people as protagonists, since it shared the main role with the model Javiera Arnillas. In 2020, she was cast in the movie El niño que no quería matar. In 2022, she played the protagonist in the film Un romance singular, playing Tifanny.

In 2018, she participated in the television contest Los cuatro finalistas with the song "Ven mi amor" by Chacalón. In 2019, she published her first single, "Esta es mi fiesta", composed for the documentary film Miss Amazonas. As a professional impersonator of Laura León, she has participated in the Peruvian reality television show Yo soy since 2020.

In February 2020, she denounced Dina Boluarte through a book and police report for transphobic treatment when the Peruvian president was head of the RENIEC office in the Surco district.

== Filmography ==
=== Movies ===
- Sin vagina, me marginan (2017)
- El niño que no quería matar
- Sarita Colonia
- Muerte por muerte
- Un romance singular (2022)
- The Truth of Xanaxtasia (2022)

=== Television ===
- La voz
- Yo soy
- Los cuatro finalistas

== Discography ==
=== Singles ===
- "Tenemos razón" (colaboración)
- "Esta es mi fiesta"
