= El Artista del Año season 1 =

El Artista del Año
- Season 1
- Winner: Pedro Loli
- No. of episodes: 11

Release
- Original network: América Televisión
- Original release: April 28 – July 7, 2018

Season chronology
- Next → Season 2

Season one of El Artista del Año premiered on April 28, 2018, on the América Televisión network.

On July 7, 2018, Pedro Loli was crowned the champion of the season, Micheille Soifer finished second, while Rossana Fernández-Maldonado finished third.

== Cast ==
=== Contestants ===
The ten contestants were presented during the first week of the show.

Contestant	Notability (known for)	Status	Ref.
Patricio Parodi	Model	Withdrew on May 19, 2018	
Milett Figueroa	Model & actress	Eliminated 1st on May 26, 2018	
Cielo Torres	Singer & actress	Eliminated 2nd on June 2, 2018	
Alfredo Benavides	Host & comedy actor	Eliminated 3rd on June 16, 2018	
Josimar Fidel	Singer	Withdrew on June 23, 2018	
Yahaira Plasencia	Singer	Withdrew on July 7, 2018	
Luis Baca	Singer & actor	Eliminated 4th on July 7, 2018	
Rossana Fernández-Maldonado	Actress, singer and hostess	Third place on July 7, 2018	
Micheille Soifer	Singer	Runner-up on July 7, 2018	
Pedro Loli	Singer	Winner on July 7, 2018	

=== Hosts and judges ===
Gisela Valcárcel and Jaime "Choca" Mandros were the host and the co-host, respectively. Morella Petrozzi, Lucho Cáceres, Fiorella Rodríguez and Cecilia Bracamonte were the judges. During the third week, musical director Juan Carlos Fernández replaced Bracamonte.

== Scoring charts ==
Contestant	Place	1	2	3	4	5	6	7	8	9	10	9+10	11 (Note: The individual scores of the VIP jury members are not present because they were not shown in the live show.)	
Contestant	Place	1	2	3	4	5	6	7	8	9	10	9+10	Top 4	Top 3
Pedro	1	45	40	40	40	36	35	38	40	42	83	125	81	44
Micheille	2	39	45	34	37	36	33	36	38	35	75	110	84	40
Rossana	3	45	44	40	37	35	38	41	35	37	81	118	83	40
Luis	4	42	42	34	39	40	33	34	33	38	62	100	72	
Yahaira	5	40	39	37	34	34	35	42	41	35	75	110	—	
Josimar	6	48	43	37	34	38	33	34	35	—				
Alfredo	7	37	34	38	35	34	35	33	38					
Cielo	8	40	40	34	41	33	36							
Milett	9	34	35	37	34	34								
Patricio	10	—	35	27	—									

Red numbers indicate those sentenced for each week
Green numbers indicate the highest score for each week
the contestant eliminated of the week
the contestant saved in the duel
the contestant eliminated and saved with the lifeguard
the contestant withdrew from the competition
the winning contestant
the runner-up contestant
the third-place contestant

=== Average score chart ===
This table only counts performances scored on a 40-point scale. (Note: To weighted the scores and to work on the same scale, the scores of the guest judges and the extra points were excluded, while the 11 scores were changed to 10.)

Rank by average	Place	Contestant	Total points	Number of performances	Average
1	1	Pedro	530	14	37.9
2	3	Rossana	521	14	37.2
3	2	Micheille	502	14	35.9
4	5	Yahaira	386	11	35.0
5	6	Josimar	279	8	34.9
6	4	Luis	442	13	34.0
7	8	Cielo	202	6	33.7
8	7	Alfredo	268	8	33.5
9	9	Milett	159	5	31.8
10	10	Patricio	55	2	27.5

=== Higher and lower scores ===
This table has the highest and lowest scores of each contestants performance according to the 40-point scale.

Contestant	Higher score(s)	Lower score(s)
Pedro	Ballad, Rock, Disco & Ballad (40)	Cumbia (31)
Micheille	Salsa & Pasodoble (40)	Salsa (31)
Rossana	Samba, Musical, Jazz & Ballad (40)	Cumbia & Salsa (33)
Luis	Cumbia (38)	Musical (28)
Yahaira	Merengue (39)	Huayno (31)
Josimar	Salsa (38)	Revue, Cumbia & Disco (33)
Alfredo	Musical (38)	Salsa & Reggaeton (29)
Cielo	Revue (39)	Salsa & Bachata (31)
Milett	Jazz (35)	Salsa (28)
Patricio	Reggaeton (29)	Pop (26)
