= Pucallpa la Europea =

- Theatrical release poster
- Directed by: Santi Zegarra
- Written by: Santi Zegarra
- Produced by: Andrés Malatesta
- Starring: Melissa Campos; Javiera Arnillas; La Uchulú
- Cinematography: Julián Amaru Estrada
- Edited by: Roberto Benavides
- Music by: Karin Zielinski
- Production company: Sunkku Producciones
- Distributed by: CECIG Entertainment & Consulting
- Release dates: September 1, 2025 (OutfestPerú); July 9, 2026 (Peru)
- Running time: 105 minutes
- Countries: Peru; France
- Languages: Spanish; French

Pucallpa la Europea (lit. 'Pucallpa the European') is a 2025 romantic drama film written and directed by Santi Zegarra. It follows a trans woman deported from Paris to Lima who faces violence while becoming entangled in a love triangle with a French engineer and his Argentine wife. A co-production between Peru and France, the film stars Melissa Campos, Javiera Arnillas and La Uchulú, accompanied by Maxime Saint-Jean and Gabriela Pastor.

== Synopsis ==
Elsa is a trans woman who, after being deported from France to her native Peru, attempts to rebuild her life following an experience marked by violence and exclusion. In the process, she becomes entangled in a complex love triangle with French engineer Aymeric and his wife, Yena, while grappling with the consequences of her past and the conflicts arising from these relationships.

== Cast ==
The actors participating in this film are:

- Melissa Campos as Elsa
- Maxime Saint-Jean as Aymeric
- Gabriela Pastor as Yena
- Javiera Arnillas as Naomi
- La Uchulú
- Lesly Quispe as Betsy
- Ángela Villón as Madre Superiora
- Rebeca Ráez as Judith

== Release ==
The film premiered worldwide on September 1, 2025, at the 22nd OutfestPerú Film Festival as the opening film, then was screened on May 16, 2026, at the 28th Cine Las Américas International Film Festival, and on June 21 at the 12th DIGO – Festival Internacional de Cinema da Diversidade Sexual e de Gênero de Goiás.

The film was released commercially on July 9, 2026, in Peruvian theaters.
