= Sin vagina, me marginan =

- Film poster
- Directed by: Wesley Verástegui
- Written by: Wesley Verástegui
- Produced by: Wesley Verástegui
- Starring: Javiera Arnillas; Marina Kapoor; Caterine Solórzano
- Cinematography: Daniel Cortéz Valiente
- Music by: Geoffrey Cannock
- Production company: Esfena
- Release dates: November 3, 2017 (Spain); November 9, 2017 (Peru)
- Running time: 66 minutes
- Country: Peru
- Language: Spanish

Sin vagina, me marginan (lit. 'Without a vagina, I'm marginalized') is a 2017 Peruvian comedy-drama film written, directed and produced by Wesley Verástegui in his directorial debut. The film stars the model Javiera Arnillas and the singer Marina Kapoor, being the first Peruvian film in the history of this country that has transsexual people as its main characters.

== Synopsis ==
Barbie (Javiera Arnillas) is a transgender prostitute who needs operation to fulfill her dream of being a full woman and conquer a childhood sweetheart. For this she needs about 30,000 dollars, which is unaffordable for her. Together with her best friend, Microbe (Marina Kapoor), they devise a plan to get the necessary money for surgery: kidnapping Pamela (Caterine Solorzano), the daughter of transphobic Minister for Women and Vulnerable Populations.

== Cast ==
The actors participating in this film are:

- Javiera Arnillas as Barbie
- Marina Kapoor as Microbe
- Caterine Solórzano as Pamela

== Production ==
After being nominated in 2015 for the best unpublished script at the International Festival of New Latin American Cinema of Cuba and in 2016 being in the quarterfinals of the Joplin Award of the BlueCat Screenplay Competition and Short Film Festival, Verástegui decided to write the script for what would be his first film. With a budget of 5,000 dollars he produced and directed the film which was shot entirely with a mobile device iPhone 6. Filming lasted eight days, locating the scenes in various districts of the city of Lima. The cast is made up of amateur actors and actresses, friends and family members of the production.

== Release ==
In Peru, the title of the film was censored after complaints from several parents, so it could not be released to the public as scheduled for September 28, 2017, in movie theaters. Even so, it was successfully released on November 9, 2017, at the III Film Week of the University of Lima. On April 12, 2018, the film was finally released to the public through a streaming platform, Indie, which chose Verástegui's film to inaugurate the platform. In Spain it was released on November 3, 2017, at the 22nd LesGaiCineMad. After that, the film was acquired by Filmin.

== Awards ==
| Year | Award / Festival | Country | Category | Result | Ref. |
|---|---|---|---|---|---|
| 2017 | Cinema Week of the University of Lima | Peru | Best Film | Nominated | |
| 2017 | Sydney Transgender International Film Festival | Australia | Best Film | Nominated | |
| 2017 | LesGaiCineMad | Spain | Panorama section | Included | |
| 2017 | Alternative Film Festival | Canada | Best Comedy | Nominated | |
| 2017 | Alternative Film Festival | Canada | Best Cast | Nominated | |
| 2017 | Trujillo Film Festival | Peru | – | Included | |
| 2018 | Lima International Gay Lesbian Trans Film Festival – OUTFEST | Peru | – | Included | |
| 2018 | Zinentiendo: International LGBTQ Film Festival | Spain | – | Included | |
| 2018 | Mostra de Cine Divers Valencia | Spain | – | Included | |
| 2018 | Lgbtiq Film Festival at El Farolito | Costa Rica | – | Included | |
| 2018 | CINHOMO: International Festival of Cinema and Sexual Diversity | Spain | To contest | Nominated | |
| 2018 | Third Queer Film Festival | Colombia | – | Included | |
| 2018 | OUT'hood Series: Latinx Queer Films | United States | – | Included | |
| 2018 | Phoenix Awards | Mexico | Fiction and documentary | Prenominated | |

== See also ==
- List of films shot on mobile phones
