= Utopia (2018 film) =

Utopía, la película
- Theatrical release poster
- Directed by: Gino Tassara; Jorge Vilela de Rutte
- Written by: Gino Tassara
- Based on: Utopia nightclub fire
- Produced by: Gino Tassara; Jorge Vilela
- Starring: Renzo Schuller; Rossana Fernández-Maldonado; Carlos Solano
- Cinematography: José Luis Salomón
- Music by: Lucía Covarrubias; Diego Dibós; Christian Levi
- Production company: Sinargollas Producciones
- Release date: September 27, 2018
- Running time: 115 minutes
- Country: Peru
- Language: Spanish

Utopia (also known as Utopía, la película) is a 2018 Peruvian drama film directed by Gino Tassara and Jorge Vilela de Rutte. It is based on the Utopía nightclub fire that occurred on July 24, 2002.

== Synopsis ==
Julián, a frustrated investigative journalist, is obsessed with reopening the Utopia Case, the fire at the most exclusive nightclub in Lima where 29 young people died. After several comings and goings, Julián begins his investigation and learns about the drama of the bereaved in their search for justice. Relive key moments of the case finding more questions than answers.

== Cast ==
- Renzo Schuller as Julian Contreras.
- Rossana Fernández-Maldonado as Elizabeth Rasmusen (Julián's Girlfriend).
- Carlos Solano as Victor Calahua (Utopia's Bartender who helps Julián with the investigation)

== Release ==
The film was released in Peruvian theaters on September 27, 2018. The film premiered on Netflix on January 7, 2022.

== Reception ==
The film in its first weekend exceeded 115,000 spectators. At the end of the year, the film attracts more than 560,000 spectators to the cinema, becoming the fourth most watched Peruvian film in 2018.
