= The Truth of Xanaxtasia =

- Promotional release poster
- Directed by: Diego Muñoz; Ítalo Carrera
- Written by: Diego Muñoz; Ítalo Carrera
- Produced by: Manuel Ramírez; Marisol Pereyra
- Starring: Xanaxtasia
- Cinematography: Gabriel Guzmán
- Edited by: José Luis Membrillo
- Production company: Piaf Producciones
- Release date: July 14, 2022
- Running time: 64 minutes
- Country: Peru
- Language: Spanish

The Truth of Xanaxtasia (Spanish: La verdad de Xanaxtasia) is a 2022 Peruvian mockumentary film written and directed by Diego Muñoz and Ítalo Carrera. In a parody tone, it follows the life, successes and scandals surrounding the drag queen Xanaxtasia. The cast is made up of Jely Reategui, Carlos Carlín, Renzo Schuller, Gisella Ponce de León, Fiorella Rodriguez, Mónica Torres, Jaime Choca Mandros, Anaí Padilla, Zagaladas, Maykol Show, Javiera Arnillas, TontaQueen, Percy Pls, Salandela, BlackVelour, Koky Belaunde and Marina Kapoor.

== Synopsis ==
Through testimonies from journalists, family, childhood friends, and characters from the show, Xanastasia's childhood, family intimacies, entry into the entertainment world, loves, and the secrets that surround the drag queen are revealed.

== Cast ==
- Xanaxtasia as Herself
- Jely Reategui
- Carlos Carlín
- Renzo Schuller
- Gisella Ponce de León
- Fiorella Rodriguez
- Mónica Torres
- Jaime Choca Mandros
- Anaí Padilla
- Zagaladas
- Maykol Show
- Javiera Arnillas
- TontaQueen
- Percy Pls
- Salandela
- BlackVelour
- Koky Belaunde
- Marina Kapoor

== Release ==
It premiered on July 14, 2022, via streaming on Joinnus.
