= An Odd Evening in April =

Loco cielo de Abril
- Theatrical release poster
- Directed by: Sandro Ventura
- Written by: Sandro Ventura
- Produced by: Adolfo Aguilar; Jesus Alvarez Betancourt; John Mayta; Hugo Shinki; Sandro Ventura
- Starring: Fiorella Rodríguez; Adolfo Aguilar; Daniela Sarfati; Rodrigo Sánchez Patiño; Ariel Levy
- Cinematography: Omar Quezada
- Edited by: Sandro Ventura
- Music by: Mon Laferte
- Production company: Big Bang Films
- Release date: April 3, 2014
- Running time: 98 minutes
- Country: Peru
- Language: Spanish

An Odd Evening in April (Spanish: Loco cielo de Abril, lit. 'Crazy april sky') is a 2014 Peruvian romantic comedy film written and directed by Sandro Ventura. It was released on April 3, 2014.

== Synopsis ==
It is the story of Abril, a mysterious woman with a unique vision of life who crosses paths with Bruno, a young Chilean living in Peru who is going through an existential crisis. April's philosophy shocks Bruno. One fine day, he decides to leave everything, including his job and his girlfriend. Suddenly, Bruno tries to follow April's life, without suspecting the real reasons why she lives with her back to the world.

== Cast ==
- Fiorella Rodríguez as April.
- Ariel Levy as Bruno.
- Adolfo Aguilar as Renato.
- Daniela Sarfati as Luna.
- Rodrigo Sánchez Patiño as Omar.
- Valeria Bringas as Carla.
- Ximena Diaz as Viviana.
- Alessa Novelli as Mayra.
- Macla Yamada as Lucia.
- Ethel Pozo as Daniela.
- Marina Bassi as Alice.
- Yaco Eskenazi
