= Un romance singular =

- Theatrical release poster
- Directed by: Wesley Verástegui
- Written by: Wesley Verástegui
- Produced by: Wesley Verástegui
- Starring: Javiera Arnillas; Marina Kapoor; Santiago Cáceres
- Cinematography: Daniel Cortez Valiente
- Edited by: Wesley Verástegui
- Production company: Esfena
- Release date: January 6, 2022
- Running time: 85 minutes
- Country: Peru
- Language: Spanish

Un romance singular (lit. 'A singular romance') is a 2022 Peruvian romantic comedy film written, directed and produced by Wesley Verástegui. Starring Javiera Arnillas, Marina Kapoor & Santiago Cáceres. It premiered on January 6, 2022, in Peruvian theaters.

== Synopsis ==
It tells the story of a young conservative who meets a former sex worker, without imagining that they would both fall in love that same day, ignoring the past and the secrets that each one keeps, turning this romance into a battle of fear, revelations, where the love will be affected and with no chance of winning.

== Cast ==
The actors participating in this film are:

- Javiera Arnillas as Kimberly
- Marina Kapoor as Tiffany
- Santiago Cáceres

== Financing ==
Un romance singular was financed by the Directorate of Audiovisual, Phonography and New Media of the Ministry of Culture of Peru (DAFO) and produced by V&R Films.

== Controversy ==
After its premiere, congresswoman Milagros Jáuregui de Aguayo of Renovación Popular spoke out against the film on social networks because, according to her, "evangelical believers are mentioned in a derogatory and negative way, which notoriously promotes religious discrimination ", and sent a letter to the Minister of Culture Gisela Ortiz asking for explanations about the financing and cultural contribution of the production. The director Wesley Verástegui responded to the parliamentarian that it is the members of his evangelical community who discriminate against the LGBT community.
