= El Artista del Año =

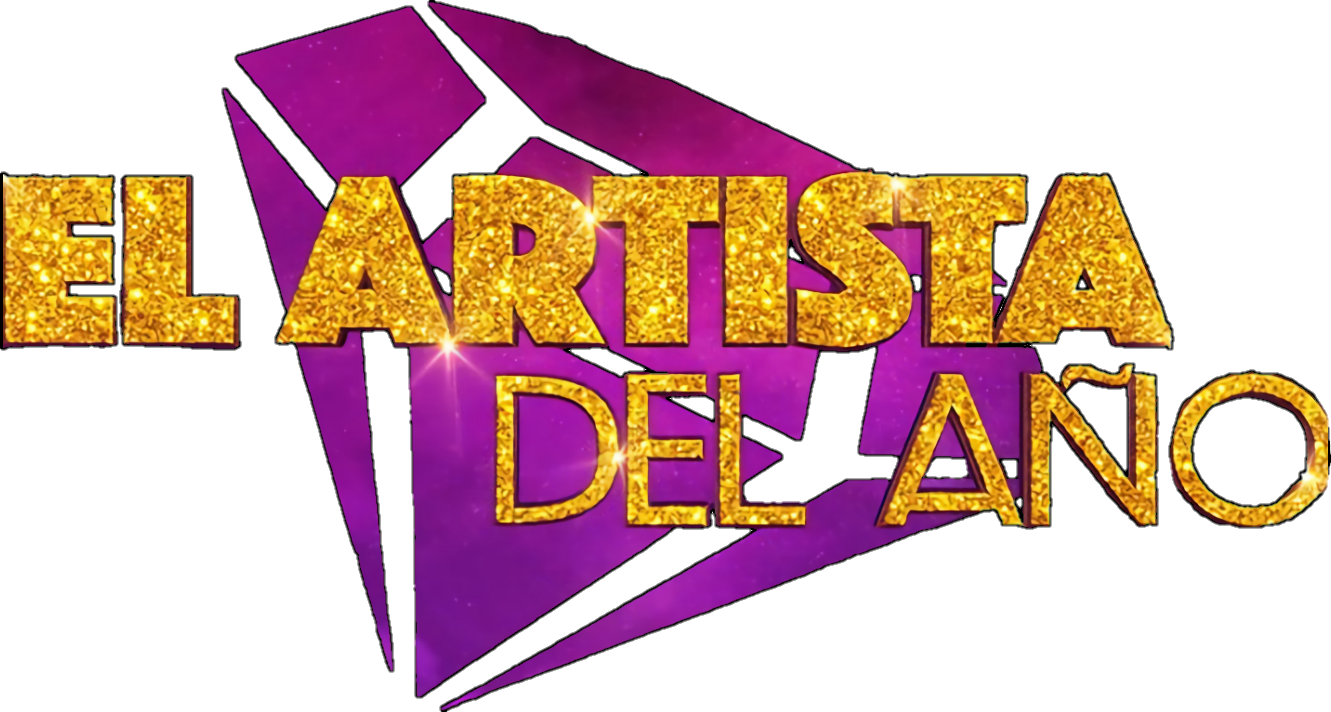
- El Artista del Año
- Genre: Reality competition
- Presented by: Gisela Valcárcel; Jaime "Choca" Mandros
- Judges: Morella Petrozzi; Cecilia Bracamonte; Fiorella Rodríguez; Lucho Cáceres
- Country of origin: Peru
- Original language: Spanish
- No. of seasons: 4
- No. of episodes: 33

Production
- Executive producers: Antonio Belevan; Denny Valdeiglesias; Gero Campos; Percy Bozzeta
- Producer: Armando Tafur
- Production locations: Pachacámac, Lima, Peru
- Running time: 150 min.

Original release
- Network: América Televisión
- Release: April 28, 2018 – present

Related
- El Gran Show

El Artista del Año is a Peruvian competition television series that premiered on April 28, 2018, on América Televisión and produced under license by GV Producciones. The show is hosted by Gisela Valcárcel and Jaime "Choca" Mandros.

The format of the show consists of different celebrities who must demonstrate their skills in various artistic styles of singing, dancing and acting.

== Cast ==
=== Hosts ===
Gisela Valcárcel is the main host since the premiere of the show, along with Jaime "Choca" Mandros who is the co-host since the first season.

=== Judging panel ===
The regular judges are the professional dancer Morella Petrozzi, the actor Lucho Cáceres, the actress and television presenter Fiorella Rodríguez and the criolla singer Cecilia Bracamonte. Other judges, most of them associated to the artistic world, have appeared as a guest judge or in substitution of one of the main judges, among them are Juan Carlos Fernández, Carlos Álvarez, Coco Marusix and Santi Lesmes.

=== Cast timeline ===
Color key:

Host	Co-host	Judge	Musical director

Cast member	Seasons			
Cast member	1	2	3	4
Gisela Valcárcel				
Jaime "Choca" Mandros				
Aldo Díaz				
Morella Petrozzi				
Lucho Cáceres				
Fiorella Rodríguez				
Cecilia Bracamonte				
Santi Lesmes				
Adolfo Aguilar				
Denisse Dibós				
Juan Carlos Fernández				

== Seasons ==
Seasons	Number of		Duration dates	Contestants in the finals		
Seasons	Stars	Weeks	Duration dates	First place	Second place	Third place
1	10	11	April 28 – July 7, 2018	Pedro Loli	Micheille Soifer	Rossana Fernández-Maldonado
2	13	11	July 14 – September 22, 2018	Daniela Darcourt	Shantall Young Oneto	Jonathan Rojas
3	15	10	September 29 – December 8, 2018	Daniela Darcourt; Pedro Loli	Rossana Fernández-Maldonado; Amy Gutiérrez	Stephanie Orúe; Cielo Torres
4	12	10	April 27 – June 29, 2019	Sandra Muente	Natalia Salas	Stephanie "Tefi" Valenzuela
5	11	10	August 17 – October 19, 2019	Amy Gutiérrez	Ernesto "Nesty" Galguera	Miguel Álvarez
6	18	9	October 26 – December 21, 2019	Ernesto "Nesty" Galguera; Amy Gutiérrez	Braulio Chappell; Dailyn Curbelo	Mario Hart; Micheille Soifer
7	10	9	April 24 – June 19, 2021	Josimar Fidel	Pamela Franco	Esaú Reátegui "Uchulú"
8	7	6	November 13 – December 18, 2021	Ruby Palomino	Yahaira Plasencia	Estrella Torres

== El desafío ==
Segment that presents a social case of urgent attention and a celebrity is invited to make a challenge, consisting of a presentation of dance, song or performance. In general, this participation will only have a few days of preparation and almost always, the chosen musical genres are those that the famous one does not know. What is sought is to sensitize the public so that donations of money or services are made to help people to whom the aid goes. A part of the results of the donations will be known at the end of the sequence and the rest, when opening the segment of the following week.

Date	Guest	Description	Recipient of aid	Ref(s)
May 5, 2018	Melissa Paredes y Maricielo Effio	Dance ("Ojitos Hechiceros")	Rosa Ángela	
August 18, 2018	Sheyla Rojas	Sing and dance ("Eternamente Bella")	Ticona family	
September 1, 2018	Rebeca Escribens	Sing and dance ("Quererte a ti» y «La candela")	Mauricio	

== Special acts ==
Date	Guest	Description
May 12, 2018	Season 1 contestants (Micheille Soifer, Alfredo Benavides, Luis Baca, Patricio Parodi, Pedro Loli, Yahaira Plasencia, Rossana Fernández-Maldonado, Cielo Torres, Josimar Fidel and Milett Figueroa)	Sing («Amor Eterno»), special for Mother's Day.
June 16, 2018	Season 1 contestants (Micheille Soifer, Alfredo Benavides, Luis Baca, Pedro Loli, Yahaira Plasencia, Rossana Fernández-Maldonado and Josimar Fidel)	Sing («Sudemos la Camiseta» / «La Copa de la Vida» / «Waka Waka (Esto es África)»), special for the World Cup Russia 2018.
July 7, 2018	Season 1 finalists (Micheille Soifer, Pedro Loli, Rossana Fernández-Maldonado and Luis Baca)	Sing («Mi Gran Noche»)
July 14, 2018	Gisela Valcárcel	Sing and dance («Yo Viviré»)
August 11, 2018	Franco Noriega	Sing («Me aceleras»)
