= El Artista del Año season 2 =

El Artista del Año
- Season 2
- Winner: Daniela Darcourt
- No. of episodes: 10

Release
- Original network: América Televisión
- Original release: July 14 – September 22, 2018

Season chronology
- ← Previous; Season 1 Next → Season 3

Season two of El Artista del Año premiered on July 14, 2018, on the América Televisión network.

== Cast ==
=== Contestants ===
On July 11, the first ten participants of the show were presented through a press conference. Although it was predetermined that ten contestants were the same as last season, it was announced that in the second gala would enter two new participants. The first of them was Ebelin Ortiz, while John Kelvin and Mirella Paz met in a duel qualified by the judges to occupy the second pass in the competition, finally the judges decided to give the pass to both, giving a total of thirteen contestants in place of the twelve provided.

During the first five weeks, the married couple Yiddá Eslava and Julián Zucchi participated together, being the first couple participating in the show. From the sixth week they competed individually.

Contestant	Notability (known for)	Status	Ref.
Kevin Blow	Singer	Eliminated 1s on July 28, 2018	
Génesis Tapia	Dancer	Eliminated 2nd on August 4, 2018	
Maricielo Effio	Actress & dancer	Eliminated 3rd on August 4, 2018	
Ricardo Rondón	TV host	Eliminated 4th on August 11, 2018	
Fresialinda	Singer	Eliminated 5th on August 18, 2018	
Mirella Paz	Model & singer	Eliminated 6th on September 1, 2018	
Yiddá Eslava	Singer & actress	Eliminated 7th on September 7, 2018	
Ebelin Ortiz	Actress & singer	Eliminated 8th on September 15, 2018	
Julián Zucchi	Singer & actor	Eliminated 9th on September 22, 2018	
John Kelvin	Singer	Eliminated 10th on September 22, 2018	
Jonathan Rojas	Singer	Third place on September 22, 2018	
Shantall Young Oneto	Singer & actress	Runner-up on September 22, 2018	
Daniela Darcourt	Singer & dancer	Winner on September 22, 2018	

=== Hosts and judges ===
Gisela Valcárcel and Jaime "Choca" Mandros returned as hosts, while Morella Petrozzi, Lucho Cáceres, Fiorella Rodríguez and Cecilia Bracamonte returned as judges. During the second and third week, theater director and presenter Santi Lesmes replaced Cáceres.

== Scoring charts ==
Contestant	Place	1	2	3	4	5	6	7 (Note: The individual scores of the VIP jury members are not present because they were not shown in the live show.)	8	9	10	11		
Contestant	Place	1	2	3	4	5	6	7	8	9	10	Top 5	Top 4	Top 3
Daniela	1	39	43	40	41	40	40	44	43	43	44	44	44	44
Shantall	2	37	39	40	33	39	42	44	41	46	42	39	38	44
Jonathan	3	35	37	37	36	38	39	41	41	41	35	39	40	40
John	4	—	—	33	34	37	37	39	42	38	40	35	35	
Julián	5	36	36	35	42	34	39	33	40	40	35	39		
Ebelin	6	—	36	40	30	36	37	35	38	37	35			
Yiddá	7	36	36	35	42	34	38	37	33	39				
Mirella	8	—	—	39	35	40	39	38	34					
Fresialinda	9	32	33	38	29	29	34							
Ricardo	10	29	32	34	34	30								
Maricielo	11	33	35	33	41									
Génesis	12	33	32	32	29									
Kevin	13	34	28	28										

Red numbers indicate those sentenced for each week
Green numbers indicate the highest score for each week
the contestant eliminated of the week
the contestant saved in the duel
the contestant eliminated and saved with the lifeguard
the winning contestant
the runner-up contestant
the third-place contestant

=== Average score chart ===
This table only counts performances scored on a 40-point scale. (Note: To weighted the scores and to work on the same scale, the scores of the guest judges and the extra points were excluded, while the 11 scores were changed to 10.)

Rank by average	Place	Contestant	Total points	Number of performances	Average
1	1	Daniela	517	13	39.8
2	2	Shantall	502	13	38.6
3	3	Jonathan	490	13	37.7
4	8	Mirella	220	6	36.7
5	5	Julián	399	11	36.3
6	7	Yiddá	324	9	36.0
7	4	John	359	10	35.9
8	6	Ebelin	320	9	35.6
9	11	Maricielo	140	4	35.0
10	9	Fresialinda	195	6	32.5
11	12	Génesis	126	4	31.5
12	10	Ricardo	155	5	31.0
13	13	Kevin	90	3	30.0

=== Higher and lower scores ===
This table has the highest and lowest scores of each contestants performance according to the 40-point scale.

Contestant	Higher score(s)	Lower score(s)
Daniela	Cumbia, Huayno, Quebradita, Pop, Lambada, Flamenco, Bachata, Bolero, Latin pop, Tango & Ballad (40)	Cumbia (38)
Shantall	Salsa, Salsa, Criollo, Tex-mex & Ballad (40)	Disco (32)
Jonathan	Samba & Balada (40)	Latin pop (34)
John	Salsa & Ballad (39)	Huayno (33)
Julián	Quebradita (40)	Latin pop (32)
Ebelin	Criollo (40)	Reggaeton (29)
Yiddá	Quebradita (40)	Latin pop & Ballad (32)
Mirella	Criollo & Salsa (39)	Reggaeton (33)
Fresialinda	Latin pop (38)	Reggaeton & Ballad (29)
Ricardo	Rock (34)	Ballad (28)
Maricielo	Latin pop (39)	Latin pop & Salsa (33)
Génesis	Reggaeton (33)	Ballad (29)
Kevin	Ballad (34)	Cumbia & Merengue (28)
