= Javiera Arnillas =

Peruvian actress and model (born 1996)

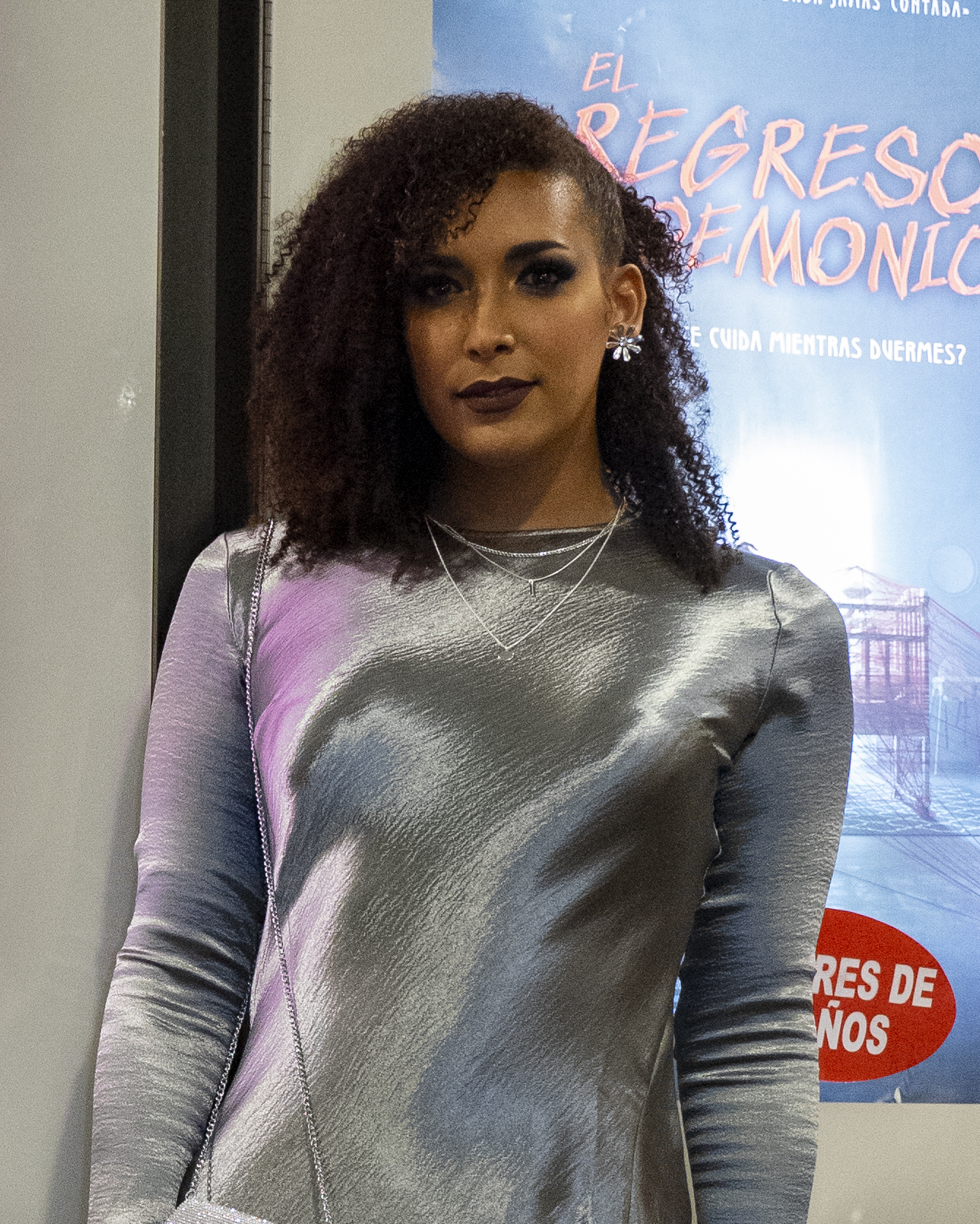
- Arnillas in 2022
- Born: Javiera Alejandra Arnillas Cartagena; 1995 (age 30–31); Chincha Alta, Ica, Peru
- Citizenship: Spanish and Peruvian
- Education: Pontifical Catholic University of Peru
- Occupations: Actress; model; activist
- Notable work: Filmography
- Awards: see here

Javiera Alejandra Arnillas Cartagena (born 1995) is a Peruvian actress, model and Afro-Peruvian trans activist.

== Early life and education ==
Born as Javier in Chincha Alta, she went to Lima in 1996 with her brother and lived at her uncle's home in Jesús María. It was there that she spent her childhood until 2002, when she moved to Spain for a year with her family. Upon their return, they all settled in Lima, where she continues to attend the San Felipe school, housed in the same-named residential community.

Despite initial confusion and concerns about her appearance, she felt a strong sexual and physical attraction to her peers, which affirmed her desire to appear completely feminine. Although her family was hesitant at first due to fears of public rejection and violence, they supported her throughout her journey. Arnillas never considered changing her name, feeling content with being called "Javi," and aspired to afford genital reassignment surgery in Thailand.

In 2016, she decided to undergo physical transition. Subsequently, she started an endocrinologist-recommended hormonal therapy that prevented the production of testosterone and started estrogen. She avoided discussing surgical procedures, her love life, nor the name that appears on her passport or ID to this day. She feels that sharing such knowledge would not help communication.

She attends the Pontifical Catholic University of Peru's (PUCP) Faculty of Performing Arts, which was the first university to formally acknowledge the freedom to gender identification. This came about as a result of her involvement in the Reforma Trans campaign, which called for the government to recognise transgender students' identities. The PUCP student organisation that got the University Council to agree to allow transgender students to use their chosen names—rather than their surnames.

== Career ==
Film director Wesley Verástegui proposed in 2017 for Arnillas to star in the film, Sin vagina, me marginan. She agreed to play "Barbie," the lead character in the film alongside transgender activist singer Marina Kapoor. She also applied to be a model for the 2018 Lima Fashion Week (LifWeek), which took place from 23 to 27 October 2017.

Arnillas later appeared in the cast of El niño que no quería matar in 2020. She was a model and beauty queen who competed in the Miss International Queen Perú pageant in 2020. As an activist, she has supported a change.org petition calling for the Peruvian Congress to discuss a gender identification bill that the legislative body's Family Commission proposed in March 2021. This allowed her to represent Peru in the Miss International Queen 2021 competition, which took place in Thailand in 2022. She starred in the film Un romance singular, which was released in 2022.

== Filmography ==
Year	Title	Role	Notes
2017	Sin vagina, me marginan	Barbie	
2018	Con amor, Ivana		
2020	El niño que no quería matar		
2022	Un romance singular	Kimberly	
2022	The Truth of Xanaxtasia		
2025	Pucallpa la Europea	Naomi	

== Awards and recognitions ==
- Miss International Queen Perú (2020)

Award	Year	Category	Nominated work	Result
Luces Awards	2023	Best Actress	Un romance singular	Nominated
