= La Uchulú =

Peruvian Internet and TV celebrity

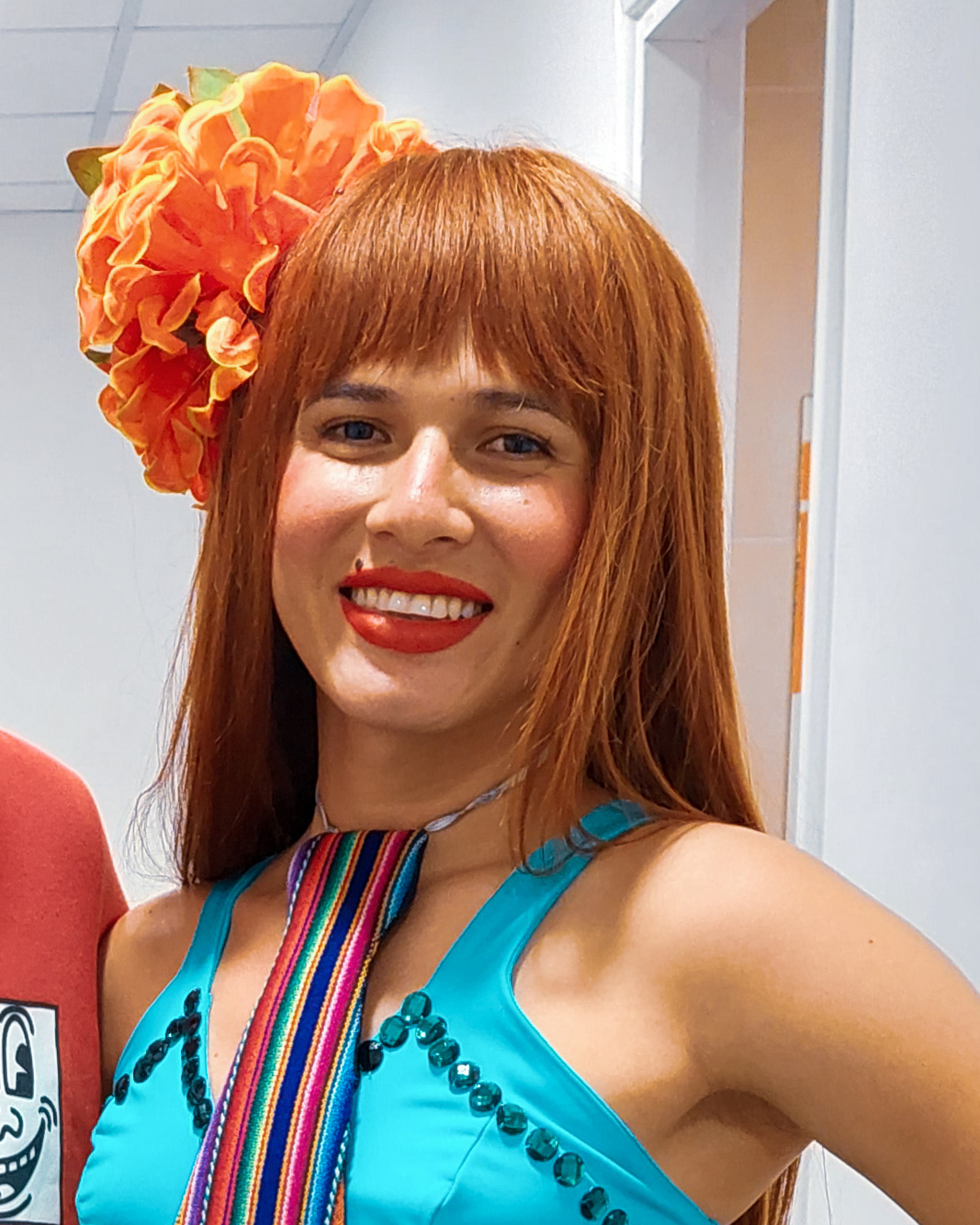
- Born: Etza Alanis Reátegui Wong; January 2, 2001 (age 25); Contamana, Peru
- Occupations: Comedian; Internet personality; Television actress
- Years active: 2018-present

Etza Alanis Reátegui Wong (born: 2 January 2001), better known as La Uchulú, is a Peruvian comedian, Internet personality, and television actress. She gained recognition in 2018 for creating content on their YouTube channel and later in 2021 while performing for the dance challenge of the song No sé on TikTok. She then participated in television programs.

== Early life ==
Etza Alanis Reátegui Wong was born on 2 January 2001 in Contamana, Loreto Department, Peru. They were the eighth of eleven siblings. After their parents' separation, they moved to Pucallpa. They began working from a young age selling groceries, to support their mother and younger siblings. Due to the family condition, she suffered from depression and attempted suicide.

== Media career ==
=== YouTube and TikTok ===
In February 2018, when Reátegui was 17 years old, they created the character La Uchulú, and established a channel on YouTube. According to them, the character's name comes from their childhood, as many people did not know how to pronounce their birth name. The channel bought success and fame to them. In the same year, they participated in the Miss Beauty Gay pageant, under the pseudonym of Alanis Villarreal, in which she came in third place. In 2020, they used the characteristic red colored wig for the character of La Uchulú and introduced his partner, the Shamuco. La Uchulú was later interviewed on the show En boca de todos in the América Televisión, which earned them fame.

In 2021, during the COVID-19 pandemic, La Uchulú performed a dance challenge for the song No sé, sung by Melody and performed by the Peruvian band Explosión de Iquitos, on their TikTok. The performance went viral, and bought them further recognition. In August 2021, they received the Silver Play button from YouTube for reaching 100,000 followers.

=== Television ===
After their popularity in social media, La Uchulú traveled to Lima and began to appear as a guest in several programs on television. They took up a role of a comedian in the show El reventonazo de la chola ("The Chola's explosion") hosted by Ernesto Pimentel and broadcast in the American Television. Amongst her performances include the parody of the doll from the South Korean series The Squid Game.

In the same year, La Uchulú took up a role as a replacement for the actress María Victoria Santana in the Reinas del show ("Queens of the show"). They took part in El artista del año ("The artist of the year") competition, where they ranked third behind Peruvian singers Josimar Fidel and Pamela Franco. In addition, they won the En boca de todos ("On everyone's lips") award in the categories "Breakthrough Artist" and "Breakthrough Comedic Character". In May 2022, Reátegui released a self composition Pobre pero pituca ("Poor little thing") in their YouTube channel.

In July 2022, La Uchulú won the title of Miss Trans Star Pucallpa held in the city of Aguaytía, which gave them a pass to enter the national contest "Miss Trans Star Peru 2022" as a representative of the Ucayali Department. In March 2023, they reported being the victim of improper contact by a singer while taking part in El reventonazo de la chola.

In August 2023, La Uchulú recorded a video song titled "Volar", together with Coco Marusix, for the Peruvian rock band Bala Perdida. The production, directed by Johana Cabañas and José Carlos Pacheco, is based on the theme of protesting against the transphobia in the Peruvian society. A few days later, La Uchulú was a victim of an act of transphobia on national television. In the reality program La casa de Magaly, make-up artist Carlos Cacho and presenter Andrés Hurtado, also contestants in the program, demanded that La Uchulú agree to be called by their deadname, as that is the one that appears in their national identity document, despite the fact that they asked them to specifically call them by their given name.

Due to the controversial episode, host Magaly Medina apologized to La Uchulú. The Ombudsman's office condemned the acts of transphobia and demanded an investigation into the event. In January 2024, the National Radio and Television Society sanctioned ATV for "infringing principles of human defense and respect for their dignity, honor, good reputation and personal privacy" due to the transphobic comments that were made against La Uchulú during that episode.

== Personal life ==
In 2021, La Uchulú declared themselves as a homosexual, and was in a relationship with Sam Gonzalez. Later in 2022, they made public their gender identity as a transsexual.

In September 2024, La Uchulú announced that they would undergo gender-affirming surgery in Thailand, which was narrated through their social networks.

== Filmography ==
=== Films ===
- Pucallpa la Europea (2025)

=== YouTube ===
Title	Year	Notes
La Uchulú, beshitos	2018-present	Protagonist
Hablando huevadas	2022	Special guest

=== Television ===
Title	Year	TV	Notes
El reventonazo de la chola	2021	América Televisión	Comedian
El artista del año	2021	América Televisión	Participant
Reinas del show	2021	América Televisión	Replacement participant
Magaly TV, la firme	2023	ATV	Participant

=== Videoclips ===
- Volar, Bala Perdida (2023)
- No sé, Explosión de Iquitos (2021)

=== Music singles ===
- Quiero intento y no puedo with Jordy Hoyos (2024)
- Pa' chipis como tu (2023)
- Mix Desamor (2023)
- El juane with Las Chaparritas de la Selva (2023)
- No te voy a perdonar (2022)

== Awards and nominations ==
Award	Year	Category	Result
Miss Beauty Gay	2018	—	Third Place
En Boca de Todos Awards	2021	Breakout Comedy Character of the Year	Won
En Boca de Todos Awards	2021	Breakout Artist of the Year	Won
Miss Trans Star Pucallpa	2022	—	Runner-up
