= Los cuatro finalistas =

- Presented by: Cristian Rivero
- Judges: Eva Ayllón; Deyvis Orosco; Chyno Miranda; Pedro Suárez-Vértiz
- Country of origin: Peru
- Original language: Spanish
- No. of seasons: 2

Production
- Production locations: Lima, Peru
- Running time: 120 minutes (with commercials)

Original release
- Network: Latina Television
- Release: April 14, 2018 – present

Los cuatro finalistas is a singing contest program of Peruvian television based on the American program The Four: Battle For Stardom, premiered on April 14 and is broadcast on Saturdays and Sundays, at 10 pm. and 7 pm. respectively. The winner will have the opportunity to sign a contract with Universal Music. The program is conducted by Cristian Rivero. It is broadcast by Latina.

The jury is composed of Eva Ayllón, Deyvis Orosco, Chyno Miranda and Pedro Suárez-Vértiz, who gives his opinion virtually.

== Format ==
The program consists in that the contestants, known as the challengers, sing live in front of the audience and the judges, who will choose if the challenger will face one of the finalists or not, the vote of the four judges must be unanimous (With only negative feedback it is enough for the challenger to be eliminated) so that the challenger has the opportunity to face the finalist he chooses (Except if only one finalist remains to challenge).

If the challenger is chosen by the judges, the challenger will move on to the next round, which consists of a singing contest between the challenger and the finalist chosen by him. At the end of the singing contest, the audience will be responsible for choosing, by means of a vote of approximately 90 seconds through the Latina app, who remains as a finalist. In either case, if the challenger stays or is eliminated, the finalist's seat is blocked, so the finalist can not be challenged again until the next program.

== Series overview ==
Season	First aired	Last aired	Winner	Runner-up	Other finalists
1	April 14, 2018	June 10, 2018	Javier Arias	José Gaona	Giani Méndez
1	April 14, 2018	June 10, 2018	Javier Arias	José Gaona	Susan Ochoa
2	June 16, 2018	August 19, 2018	José Gaona	Marcela Navarro	Jeremy Gómez
2	June 16, 2018	August 19, 2018	José Gaona	Marcela Navarro	Ray BG

== Season synopses ==
=== Season 1 ===
The first season of Los cuatro finalistas premiered on April 14, 2018 and concluded on June 10, 2018. The winner of this season was Javier Arias, with José Gaona as runner-up. Giani Méndez and Susan Ochoa were also in the final group of the finalists.

Los Cuatro Finalistas
Program	Group	Members			
Program	Group	Seat 1	Seat 2	Seat 3	Seat 4
April 14	Original Finalists	Amy Gutiérrez	Carlos Burga	Susan Ochoa	Fico Wiesse
April 15	2nd Finalists	Giani Méndez	Carlos Burga	Susan Ochoa	Farik Grippa
April 21	3rd Finalists	Giani Méndez	Carlos Burga	Susan Ochoa	Farik Grippa
April 22	4th Finalists	Giani Méndez	Jeyko Atoche	Susan Ochoa	Farik Grippa
April 28	5th Finalists	Giani Méndez	Jeyko Atoche	Susan Ochoa	Farik Grippa
April 29	6th Finalists	Giani Méndez	Jeyko Atoche	Susan Ochoa	Lita Pezo
May 5	7th Finalists	Giani Méndez	Jeyko Atoche	Susan Ochoa	José Gaona
May 6	8th Finalists	Giani Méndez	Jeyko Atoche	Susan Ochoa	José Gaona
May 12	9th Finalists	Giani Méndez	Javier Arias	Susan Ochoa	José Gaona
May 13	10th Finalists	Giani Méndez	Javier Arias	Susan Ochoa	José Gaona
May 19	11th Finalists	Giani Méndez	Javier Arias	Susan Ochoa	José Gaona
May 20	12th Finalists	Giani Méndez	Javier Arias	Susan Ochoa	José Gaona
May 26	13th Finalists	Giani Méndez	Javier Arias	Susan Ochoa	José Gaona
May 27	14th Finalists	Giani Méndez	Javier Arias	Aldair Sánchez	José Gaona
June 2	15th Finalists	Giani Méndez	Javier Arias	César Mancilla	José Gaona
June 3	16th Finalists	Giani Méndez	Javier Arias	Nicole La Rosa	José Gaona
June 9	17th Finalists	Giani Méndez	Javier Arias	Nicole La Rosa	José Gaona
June 10	Final Finalists	Giani Méndez	Javier Arias	Susan Ochoa	José Gaona

=== Season 2 ===
The second season of Los cuatro finalistas premiered on June 16, 2018.

Los Cuatro Finalistas
Program	Group	Members			
Program	Group	Seat 1	Seat 2	Seat 3	Seat 4
June 16	Original Finalists	Reymar Perdomo	Farik Grippa	Angélica Pineda	Jeremy Gómez
June 17	2nd Finalists	Jair Mendoza	Farik Grippa	Joseph Buitrón	Jeremy Gómez
June 23	3rd Finalists	Jair Mendoza	Farik Grippa	Joseph Buitrón	Jeremy Gómez
June 24	4th Finalists	Pedro Crisanto	Sheyly Navarro	Joseph Buitrón	Jeremy Gómez
June 30	5th Finalists	Pedro Crisanto	Michael Abanto	Joseph Buitrón	Jeremy Gómez
July 1	6th Finalists	Pedro Crisanto	José Gaona	Leonardo Navarro	Jeremy Gómez
July 7	7th Finalists	Pedro Crisanto	José Gaona	Franz Ato	Anthony Cuba
July 8	8th Finalists	Ruby Palomino	José Gaona	Franz Ato	Gonzalo Gkikas
July 14	9th Finalists	Ruby Palomino	José Gaona	Franz Ato	Gonzalo Gkikas
July 15	10th Finalists	Ruby Palomino	Juan Carlos Fiño	Ray BG	Gonzalo Gkikas
July 21	11th Finalists	Ruby Palomino	Juan Carlos Fiño	Ray BG	Gonzalo Gkikas
July 22	12th Finalists	Ruby Palomino	Juan Carlos Fiño	Ray BG	Gonzalo Gkikas
July 28	13th Finalists	Ruby Palomino	Juan Carlos Fiño	Daniel Figueredo	Leila Doktorowicz
July 29	14th Finalists	Ruby Palomino	Ani Rodríguez	Marcela Navarro	Leila Doktorowicz
August 4	15th Finalists	Ruby Palomino	Ani Rodríguez	Marcela Navarro	Leila Doktorowicz
August 5	16th Finalists	Susan Prieto	Angiesu	Marcela Navarro	Leila Doktorowicz
August 11	17th Finalists	Carmen Castro	Nash Moreno	Marcela Navarro	Elliot Nima
August 12	18th Finalists	Ricky Santos	Audra Jimena & Rachel Beth	Marcela Navarro	Cristean Bejarano
August 18	19th Finalists	Ricky Santos	Audra Jimena & Rachel Beth	Marcela Navarro	Cristean Bejarano
August 19	Final Finalists	José Gaona	Jeremy Gómez	Marcela Navarro	Ray BG

=== Season 3: La Batalla Final ===
The third season of Los cuatro finalistas premiered on November 15, 2018.

Los Cuatro Finalistas
Program	Group	Members			
Program	Group	Seat 1	Seat 2	Seat 3	Seat 4
November 9	Original Finalists	Giani Méndez	Carmen Castro	Farik Grippa	Jeyko Atoche
November 10	2nd Finalists	Giani Méndez	Abigail Márquez	Farik Grippa	Jeyko Atoche
November 16	3rd Finalists	Giani Méndez	Teresa Medrano	Farik Grippa	Jeyko Atoche
November 17	4th Finalists	Daniel Lazo	Aldair Sánchez	Farik Grippa	Jeyko Atoche
November 23	5th Finalists	Daniel Lazo	Randy Feijoo	Farik Grippa	Jeyko Atoche
November 24	6th Finalists	Daniel Lazo	Randy Feijoo	Farik Grippa	Jeyko Atoche
November 30	7th Finalists	Daniel Lazo	Randy Feijoo	Farik Grippa	Jeyko Atoche
December 1	8th Finalists	Daniel Lazo	Randy Feijoo	Farik Grippa	Jeyko Atoche
December 7	9th Finalists	Daniel Lazo	Randy Feijoo	Farik Grippa	Jeyko Atoche
December 8	10th Finalists	Daniel Lazo	Randy Feijoo	Farik Grippa	Jeyko Atoche
December 15	Final Finalists	Giani Méndez	Randy Feijoo	Farik Grippa	Jeyko Atoche

== See also ==
- The Four: Battle For Stardom — USA version of the Israeli format called The Final Four.
