= Rossana Fernández-Maldonado =

Peruvian actress (born 1977)

- Born: Rossana Fernández-Maldonado Nagaro; 1977 (age 48–49); Lima, Perú
- Occupations: Actress; singer
- Years active: 1991–present
- Spouse: Nicolás Sáez Yano (2008-2017)
- Children: 2

Rossana Fernández-Maldonado Nagaro (born 3 November 1977) is a Peruvian actress, singer and TV host. In 2006 she joined the cast of Mi problema con las mujeres, which was nominated for International Emmy for Best Comedy. In her country, she has starred in the musicals Cabaret and Amor sin barreras (West Side Story).

She has been an antagonist of the telenovelas La mujer en el espejo and La Traición.

== Filmography ==
List of film credits as an actress
Year	Title	Role	Notes
2001	Señor Ladrón	Livia	Short film
2004	Una sombra al frente	Rosita Aet	
2005	Anillo de compromiso	Maya	Short film
2009	Zona Oculta	Micaela	Short film
2013	Teresa, la novia de libertador	Catalina	
2018	Utopia	Elizabeth Rasmusen	

List of television credits as an actress
Year	Title	Role	Notes
1996	Nino	Sofía Yépez	
1997	Leonela, muriendo de amor	Patricia 'Paty' Machado Mirabal	
1998	Luz María	Liliana "Lily" Aldama de la Vega	
1999	Isabella, mujer enamorada	Patricia Armendáriz	
2000	Pobre diabla	Sandra Palacios	
2002	Vale todo	Beatriz	Lead role
2002	Teatro desde el Teatro	The angel	Episode "Un cuento de Navidad"
2003	Ama la Academia	Manuela Echeverry	Lead role
2004	La mujer en el espejo	Xiomara Carvajal	Antagonist
2005—2006	Decisiones	Various roles	18 episodes
2006	Esta Sociedad	Sandra Queirolo	
2006	Mi problema con las mujeres	Caro	
2007	Un amor indomable	Julieta Pérez de Romaña	Lead role
2008	Placeres y Tentaciones	Chiara Pringle	Lead role
2008	Esta Sociedad 2	Sandra Queirolo	
2008	La Traición	Beatriz de Linares	Antagonist
2011	La santa sazón	Luz Gringuita	Lead role

List of television credits as herself
Year	Title	Role	Notes
1991—1995	Nubeluz	Cíndela	4 temporadas
2009	Fuego cruzado: Vidas extremas	Famous person	1 episode
2009	El show de los sueños: sangre de mi sangre	Contestant	2° place
2009	El show de los sueños: reyes del show	Contestant	4° place
2012—present	Hola a todos	Host	

== Theatre ==
List of credits in theater as an actress
Year	Title	Role	Notes
1999	A chorus line	Maggie	
2005	Grease	Sandy Olsson	Lead role Teatro Colsubsidio, Bogotá
2006	Broadway nights	Roxie Hart/Charity Hope Valentine	
2009	Una pulga en la oreja	Bavet	July 9—August 22
2009	A pie, descalzos ¡vamos!	Ángel	October 1—October 10
2009	Cabaret	Sally Bowles	Lead role Teatro Marsano; October 1—October 31
2010	El musical 2010	Various roles	May 12—June 27
2010	¡Grántico, pálmani, zum!	Cíndela	Children's show
2011	West Side Story	Maria Nunez	Lead role Teatro Municipal (Lima); June 2—July 10
2012	Hairspray	Amber Von Tussle	Teatro Peruano Japonés; May 14—August 16

== Discography ==
Year	Song	Album	Notes
2009	«¡Despierta, es navidad!»	La Navidad de tus sueños	Feat. El show de los sueños artists.
2010	«Yo te prometo»	-	Feat. José Val
