= Cecilia Bracamonte =

Peruvian singer

Cecilia Bracamonte Chocano (Lima, November 22, 1949) is a Peruvian singer. Her music genre is mainly Peruvian waltz which is the music heard in the main coastal cities. Her singing career spans more than four decades.

== OTI Festival ==
In 1977 she was selected by América Televisión to represent Peru in the sixth edition of the OTI Festival with a song called "Landó", composed by Chabuca Granda. She was placed joint sixth with three points, confirming her prestige in Peru.
