= Pedro Suárez-Vértiz discography =

- Studio albums: 6
- Compilation albums: 8
- Remix albums: 1
- Singles: 32
- Music videos: 21
- Collaboration albums: 2
- Other appearances: 13

Pedro Suárez-Vértiz (13 February 1969 – 28 December 2023) was a Peruvian musician and singer-songwriter. He released six studio albums, eight compilation albums, one remix album, 32 singles and 21 music videos. Additionally, he released two collaboration albums and has made 13 other music appearances. He began his career at age 16, forming his first band Paranoia, which later developed to the popular Arena Hash. Pedro Suárez-Vértiz became one of the most popular Peruvian singers during the 1980s-2000s, with his first three albums exceeding sales over 30,000. His most successful album would be Póntelo en la Lengua, which sold a over 100,000 total copies.

== Albums ==
=== Studio albums ===
Title	Details	Certifications
(No existen) Técnicas Para Olvidar	Released: 19 October 1993; Label: Discos Independientes, Sony Music Latin; Formats: Cassette, CD, digital download	UNIMPRO: 3× Platinum
Póntelo en la Lengua	Released: 17 September 1996; Label: Sony Music Latin; Formats: Cassette, CD, 2×LP, digital download	UNIMPRO: 3× Platinum
Degeneración Actual	Released: 9 November 1999; Label: Sony Music Latin; Formats: Cassette, CD, digital download	UNIMPRO: 3× Platinum
Play	Released: 6 December 2004; Label: Solver Label; Formats: CD, digital download	
Talk Show	Released: 1 January 2006; Label: Solver Label; Formats: CD, CD-ROM, digital download	
Amazonas	Released: 11 June 2009; Label: Warner Music Spain; Formats: CD, CD-ROM, digital download	

=== Compilation albums ===
Title	Details	Certifications
Lo Mejor de Pedro Suárez-Vértiz Vol. 1	Released: 2000; Label: Sony Music Latin; Formats: CD, digital download	
Lo Mejor de Pedro Suárez-Vértiz Vol. 2	Released: 2001; Label: Sony Music Latin; Formats: CD, digital download	
Anécdotas	Released: 2003; Label: Sony Music Latin; Formats: CD, digital download	
Pedro Suárez-Vértiz	Released: 2007; Label: Warner Music Spain; Formats: CD, digital download	
Ponerme a Volar	Released: 2011; Label: Solver Label; Formats: CD, digital download	UNIMPRO: 3× Platinum
Pedro Suárez Vértiz para Bebés (Vol.1)	Released: 2020; Label: Solver Label; Formats: CD, digital download	
30 Grandes Éxitos	Released: 2024; Label: Solver Label; Formats: Digital download	
30 Grandes Canciones (with Arena Hash)	Released: 2024; Label: Solver Label; Formats: Digital download	

=== Remix album ===
- Amazonas Uncut (2010)

== Singles ==
- Siempre aquí en mi piel (2017) (with Pedro Suárez-Vértiz La Banda)
- El triunfo tan soñado (2017) (performed by Pedro Suárez-Vértiz La Banda)
- Jugamos todos (2019) (performed by Pedro Suárez-Vértiz La Banda)
- Amor yo te perdí la fe (2023) (2 versions: one by Pedro himself with the use of A.I. and another by Pedro Suárez-Vértiz La Banda)

== Collaborations ==
=== Collaboration albums ===
Title	Details
El Encuentro (with Gian Marco)	Released: 2014; Label: Solver Label; Formats: CD, digital download
Cuando Pienses en Volver (with Pedro Suárez-Vértiz La Banda)	Released: 2014; Label: Solver Label; Formats: CD, digital download

=== Other appearances ===
Year	Album	Artist	Details
1989	Nina & Gin-Zen	Nina & Gin-Zen	Choir ("Si Se Va")
1995	Dime Si Puedo Encontrarte	Jorge Pardo	Electric guitar ("Ya Conseguiste Mi Amor")
1996	No Me Acuerdo Quien Fuí	Christian Meier	Backing vocals ("Esa Sí Es una Mujer")
1997	BlackJack	Patricio Suárez-Vértiz	Backing vocals ("Latino", "Te Quiere Amar"), electric guitar ("Latino")
1997	Fuego Azul	Diego Bertie	Composer ("El Fuego Que No Ves")
1997	Lo Último de Almendra	Almendra Gomelsky	Composer ("El Cometa", "Yo No Juego a la Guerra")
1999	Primero en Mojarme	Christian Meier	Electric guitar ("Quién Sabe", "Quédate", "Espérame en el Tren", "Me Recuerdas a Alguien")
2000	Para Llegar Alto	Red Zafiro	Composer ("Cambiaremos de Lugar", "Si Buscas Ser Feliz", "Las Diez Ya No Me Ves")
2000	Pega	Arturo Pomar Jr.	Composer ("Kangrejo II")
2000	Navegante	Nina Mutal	Composer ("Conexiones de Madrugada")
2002	Once Noches	Christian Meier	Bass guitar, electric guitar ("Indecente")
2010	Rarezas	Libido	Vocals ("Sed")
2015	Aquí y Ahora	Nina Mutal	Composer ("A Ese Infierno No Voy a Volver")

== Videography ==
=== Music videos ===
Year	Title	Album
1993	"Me elevé"	(No existen) Técnicas Para Olvidar
1993	"Cuéntame"	(No existen) Técnicas Para Olvidar
1994	"Globo de gas"	(No existen) Técnicas Para Olvidar
1996	"Me estoy enamorando"	Póntelo en la Lengua
1996	"Los globos del cielo"	Póntelo en la Lengua
1997	"Mi auto era una rana"	Póntelo en la Lengua
1999	"Degeneración actual"	Degeneración Actual
2000	"Un vino, una cerveza"	Degeneración Actual
2000	"Alguien que bese como tú"	Degeneración Actual
2003	"Bailar"	Play
2004	"Cuando pienses en volver"	Play
2005	"Lo olvidé"	Play
2005	"Como las mariposas"	Play
2006	"No llores más, morena"	Talk Show
2009	"Amazonas"	Amazonas
2009	"Nadia"	Amazonas
2010	"Ponerme a volar" (unreleased)	Amazonas
2023	"Amor yo te perdí la fe"	non-album

=== Collaborations in music videos ===
Year	Title	Other Performer	Album
2012	"Me Cansé"	Anna Carina	AnnaCarinaPop
2017	"Siempre Aquí en Mi Piel" (official and lyric videos)	Pedro Suárez-Vértiz La Banda	non-album
