= Ego Kill Talent =

Brazilian rock band

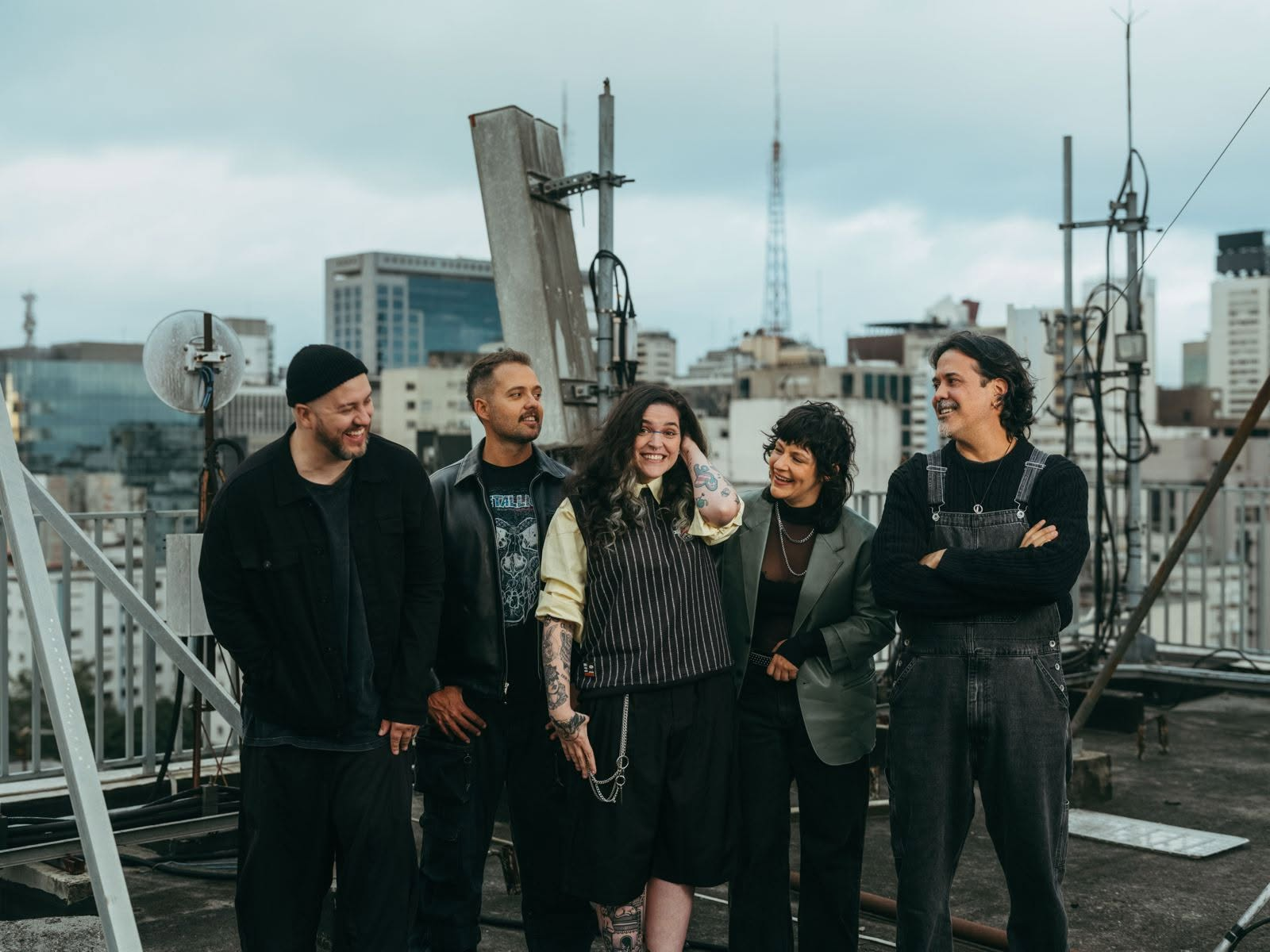
- Ego Kill Talent in 2026

Background information
- Origin: São Paulo, Brazil
- Genres: Rock; alternative rock; alternative metal
- Years active: 2014–present
- Members: Emmily Barreto; Theo van der Loo; Niper Boaventura; Raphael Miranda; Cris Botarelli
- Past members: Estevam Romera; Jonathan Dörr; Jean Dolabella
- Website: egokilltalent.com

Ego Kill Talent are a Brazilian rock band from São Paulo, Brazil. The band was founded in 2014 by Jean Dolabella and Theo van der Loo. The name of the band is a shortened version of the saying "too much ego will kill your talent". The band is known for changing musical instruments during a performance.

== Biography ==
=== 2014–2021: Formation and albums ===
The band Ego Kill Talent was founded in December 2014 by members of several Brazilian bands, like Udora, Sepultura, Reação em Cadeia and Sayowa. In November 2015, they released their first EP titled Sublimated. This was produced in the Family Mob Studios, which was founded by Jean Dolabella and Estevam Romera. Halfway through 2016, their second EP Still Here was released. They also performed at different festivals that year, including Lollapalooza in Brazil. Estevam Romera left the band that year, being replaced by Niper Boaventura.

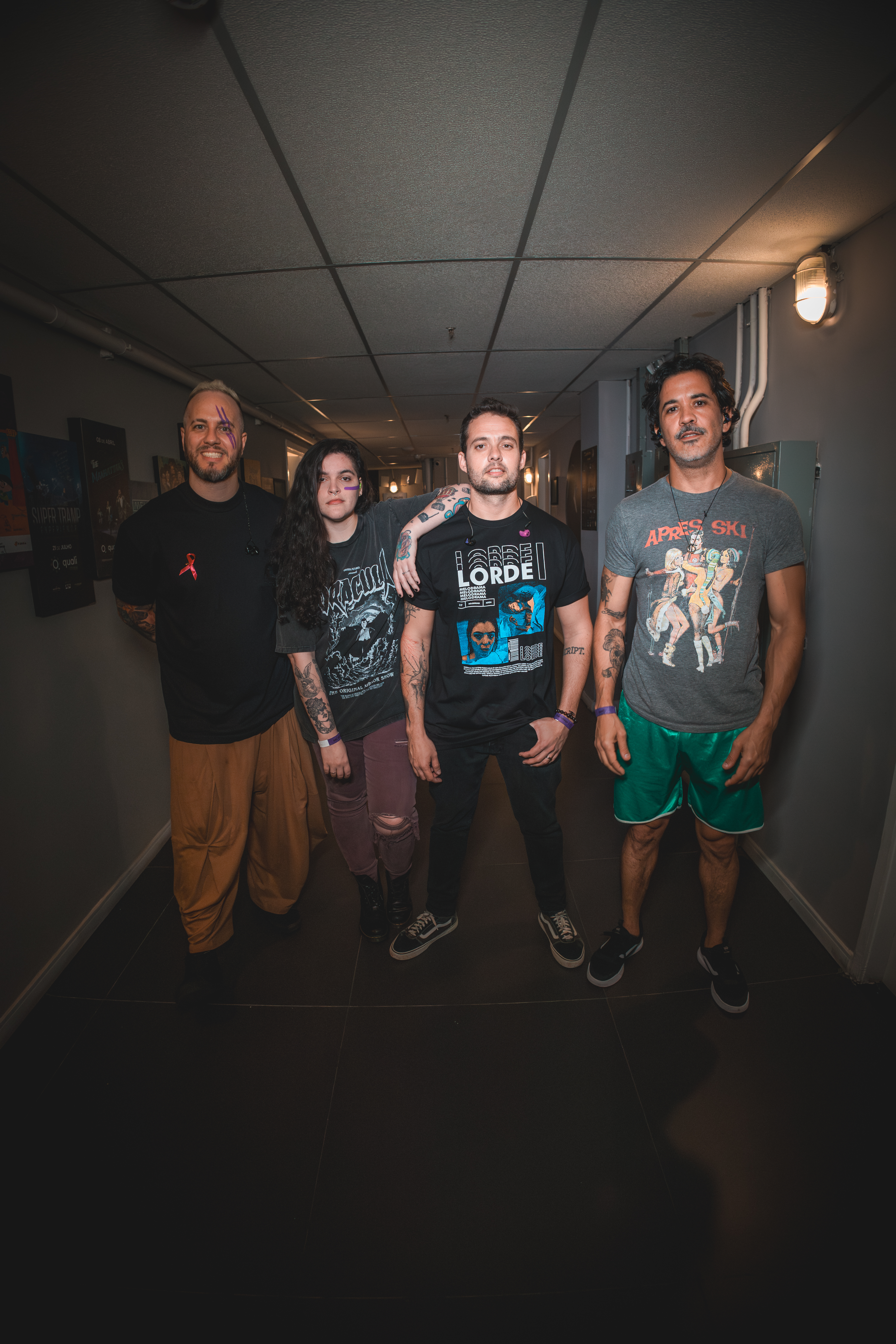
EGO KILL TALENT by Diego Castanho

Ego Kill Talent's first album was released in 2017. This album, which carries the same name as the band, was the band's breakthrough. They were named by Google as one of the twenty breakthrough acts of 2017. They also recorded a song with the band Far from Alaska, called "Collision Course". The band came in the summer to Europe to organize a mini-tour. They first played at the Download Festival in Paris. A few days later, they played their first European solo show at the Melkweg in Amsterdam. A week later, they played as the supporting act for the band System of a Down during a show in Nîmes in France. After the European tour was over, they went back to Brazil to perform at the Rock in Rio Festival. The same year, their third EP My Own Deceiver was released, and an acoustic version of the song "We All" came out as a single. In 2018, they were the supporting act on the Brazilian tour of the Foo Fighters and Queens of the Stone Age. The band also released a live EP of their European tour, called Live in Europe 2017. All songs on the EP were also released as singles. They also did a European summer tour in 2018. The band played at festivals and acted as a supporting act for the band Shinedown. They opened for symphonic metal band Within Temptation during the first leg of their Resist Tour.

On March 19, 2021, the band released their second album, The Dance Between Extremes, which was recorded at the Foo Fighters' famed 606 Studios. The album features 12 tracks with special guests John Dolmayan (System of a Down), Roy Mayorga (Stone Sour) and skateboarder Bob Burnquist (13-time X Games champion).

=== 2022-present: Emmily Barreto as the new lead singer ===
The original vocalist, Jonathan Correa, left EKT. The band's official Instagram's page made the announcement, describing the split as "the best decision" for everyone involved.

Weeks later, the band made another announcement in a minimalist and mysterious way on social media, deleting all old Instagram posts and posting captionless photos of each of the four remaining members as well as Emmily Barreto, who is now an official member. In 2023, they opened for the band Evanescence during the Brazilian leg of their The Bitter Truth Tour.

== Discography ==
=== Albums ===
- Ego Kill Talent (2017)
- The Dance Between Extremes (2021)

=== EPs ===
- Sublimated (2015)
- Still Here (2016)
- My Own Deceiver (2017)
- Live in Europe 2017 (2018)

=== Singles ===
- "Collision Course" (2017) with Far from Alaska
- "We All" (acoustic version) (2017)
- "Sublimated" – live at Arènes De Nîmes (2017)
- "Still Here" – live at Arènes De Nîmes (2017)
- "Last Ride" – live at Arènes De Nîmes (2017)
- "We All/The Searcher" – live at Melkweg (2018)
- "Just to Call You Mine" – live at Melkweg (2018)
- "My Own Deceiver" – live at Arènes De Nîmes (2018)
- "Diamonds and Landmines" (2018)
- "NOW!" (2020)
- "Lifeporn" (2020)
- "The Call" (2020) – No. 35 Mainstream Rock Songs
- "WE MOVE AS ONE" (featuring Andreas Kisser and Rob Damiani) (2024)

== Band members ==
Current

- Theo van der Loo – guitar (2014–present), bass (2014–2024)
- Raphael Miranda – drums (2014–present), bass (2014–2024)
- Niper Boaventura – guitar (2016–present), bass (2016–2024)
- Emmily Barreto – vocals (2022–present)
- Cris Botarelli – bass (2024–present)

Former

- Estevam Romera – bass, guitar (2014–2016)
- Jonathan Corrêa – vocals (2014–2022)
- Jean Dolabella – drums, guitar (2014–2023)
