= Cuéntame =

Cuéntame may refer to:

- Cuéntame cómo pasó, usually shortened to Cuéntame, a Spanish television historical drama series that ran from 2001 to 2023
  - Cuéntame cómo pasó, a 2017 Argentine adaptation
  - "Cuéntame", the series theme song by Fórmula V
- Cuéntame (Rosario Flores album), 2009
- Cuéntame (Lucerito album), 1989
- "Cuéntame", a song by Pedro Suárez-Vértiz from (No existen) Técnicas Para Olvidar, 1993
