= Amándote =

Amándote (Spanish for 'Loving You') may refer to:

- "Amándote" (Thalía song), 1995
- "Amándote" (Anna Carina song), 2014

== See also ==
- Amándote a la Italiana, a 1985 album by Luis Miguel
- "Amandoti", a 1990 song by CCCP - Fedeli alla linea
