= Leonardo Marques =

Brazilian singer songwriter

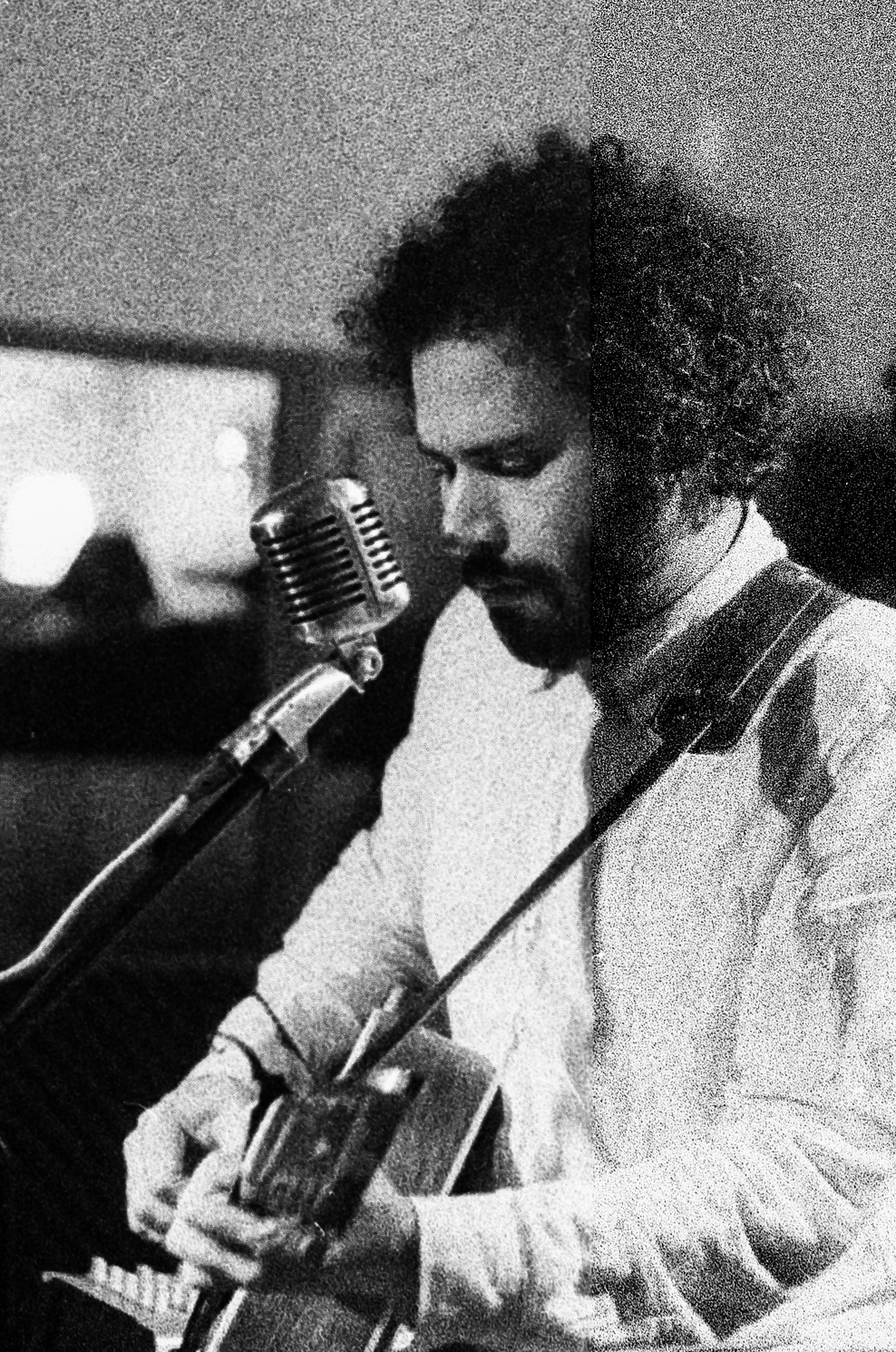
- Leonardo Marques - Belo Horizonte, MG (2020) by Lucca Mezzacappa

Background information
- Birth name: Leonardo Rios Marques
- Born: December 2, 1978 (age 46)
- Origin: Belo Horizonte, Brazil
- Genres: Folk, MPB, Blues, Rock, Alt Rock, Indie Rock
- Instrument(s): Guitar, Piano, Keyboards, Bass, Drums, Vocals
- Labels: Disk Union, La Femme Qui Roule, Think Records, 180g
- Website: https://ilhadocorvo.com/

Leonardo Rios Marques is a Brazilian singer songwriter, music producer, sound engineer and owner of the Ilha do Corvo studios, and is one of the founders of the La Femme Qui Roule. record label. He studied at Fundação de Educação Artística in Belo Horizonte, the Silverlake Conservatory of Music in Los Angeles, California and at UFMG (Federal University of Minas Gerais).

== Background ==
Marques was the guitar player of the band Diesel (later called Udora). The band was on the main line up of the Rock in Rio III Festival, playing for over 250 thousand people as an opening act for the Red Hot Chili Peppers, Silverchair and Deftones. He moved to Los Angeles with the band and signed a record deal with Clive Davis (J-records/RCA) and worked with Matt Wallace (Maroon 5, Faith no more) Gavin Mackillop (Goo Goo Dolls, Toad the wet sprocket) Camus (David Byrne, Arto Lindsay) Bob Marlette (Black Sabbath, Tracy Chapman, Alice Cooper) e Thom Russo, 16th times Grammy Award (Michael Jackson, Audioslave, Johnny Cash, Maná).

Moving back to Brazil he recorded for Som Livre his last work with Udora, co-produced with Henrique Portugal (Skank) and founded the band Transmissor, which has 3 studio records - Sociedade do Crivo Mútuo (2008), Nacional (2011) e De Lá Não Ando Só (2014) - the last one produced by Carlos Eduardo Miranda (Skank, O Rappa, Cansei de Ser Sexy, Mundo Livre SA).

== Solo career ==
Leonardo Marques has released three solo records - "Dia e noite no mesmo céu” (2012), "Curvas, lados, linhas tortas sujas e discretas” (2015), which was released in Japan by Disk Union, where he toured in 2015, and in 2018 he released his third solo record - “Early Bird” on CD by Think Records/Disk Union in Japan. Also released in the US, Europe and Japan on vinyl through the French record label 180g together with Disk Union.

== Latest Productions ==
Among with the releases of over 100 records, singles and EPs, in 2018 Rolling Stone magazine featured “Thinking Out Loud” by the band Moons one of the best 25 records of the year which Leonardo recorded, produced, mixed and mastered. Long time collaborator with the band Maglore, He produced together with Rafael Ramos (Titãs, Elza Soares, João Donato, Pitty) the latest two records released by Deck Disc - "III" (2015) and “Todas as bandeiras” (2017). He also featured as a guitar player on Maglore's 2019 DVD “Maglore Ao Vivo”, recorded at Cine Joia, São Paulo - Brazil.

In October 2018 he recorded Milton Nascimento together with the Californian record producer Jonathan Wilson (Roger Waters, Father John Misty, Dawes, Jackson Browne) the drummer and producer Joey Waronker (R.E.M, Beck, Atoms for peace, Roger Waters) and the bass player and Producer Gus Seyffert (Black Keys, Beck, Dr. Dog, Roger Waters, Norah Jones).

He produced several releases For Natura Musical, including Iconili's latest album, “Quintais”, featured Paulo Santos (Uakti), and Azul Flamingo EP produced together with Pupillo (Nação Zumbi, Céu, Erasmo Carlos, Gal Costa, Nando Reis) and also Teago Oliveira (Maglore) first solo record

In 2020 Leonardo Marques featured on two tracks of Maxime Guiguet's (Blundetto) sixth studio record entitled “Good Good Things”, ten years after his debut with “Bad Bad Things”, featuring also the Moroccan singer Hindi Zahra and Hervé Salters, member of General Elektriks.

== Discography ==
=== Diesel ===
Diesel (2000)

Independent release

=== Udora ===
Liberty Square (2005)

Goodbye, Alô (2008)

Independent release

=== Transmissor ===
Sociedade do Crivo Mútuo (2008)

Nacional (2011)

De Lá Não Ando Só (2014)

Record Label - Ultra music

=== Solo career ===
Dia e noite no mesmo céu (2012)

Curvas, lados, linhas tortas sujas e discretas (2015)

Early Bird (2018)

Record Label - La Femme aqui Roule

Think Records - Disk Union

180g

=== Maglore ===
III (2015)

Todas as bandeiras (2017)

Maglore Ao vivo (2019)

Record Label - Deck Disc

=== Congo Congo ===
Congo Congo (2017)

Record Label - La Femme Qui Roule

=== Blundetto ===
Good Good Things - (2020)

Record Label - Heavenly sweetness
