= Jean Dolabella =

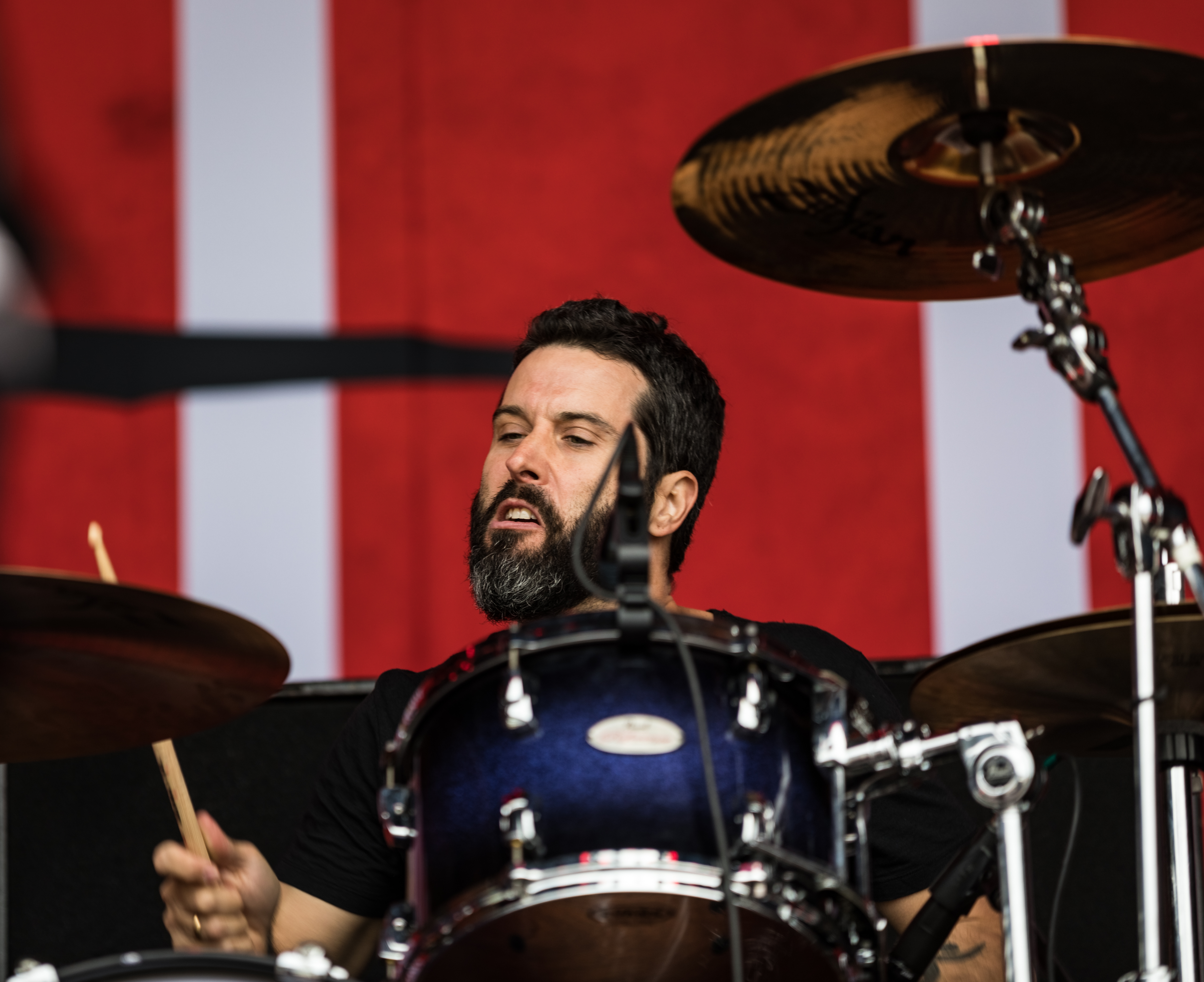
- Dolabella in 2018

Background information
- Born: Jean Turrer Dolabella; 14 May 1978 (age 47); Uberaba, Minas Gerais, Brazil
- Genres: Heavy metal; groove metal; thrash metal; experimental rock; alternative rock
- Occupations: Musician; songwriter; producer
- Instruments: Drums; percussion; bass guitar; electric guitar

Jean Turrer Dolabella (born 14 May 1978) is a Brazilian drummer, multi-instrumentalist member of Ego Kill Talent. He is also a music producer and one of the founders of Family Mob Studios, where he teaches, promotes workshops and drum camps. In 2004, he graduated at Los Angeles College of Music, and from 2006 to 2011, Jean Dolabella played the drums in thrash metal band Sepultura. He has played and recorded with several Brazilian artists such as Lenine, Milton Nascimento, Ana Carolina, and also with international artists such as Paul Di'Anno and Mike Patton. He has worked with producers Matt Wallace, Thom Russo and Steve Evetts.

== Biography ==
Jean Dolabella's first "notorious" musical work was the first release from his old band Diesel, which, for legal reasons, later changed its name to Udora. By that time, he was a drumming teacher at the Pro-Music School in Belo Horizonte. After a period living in the US with Udora, Dolabella left the band. Around the same time, in 2006, Sepultura's original drummer Igor Cavalera had quit the band and Dolabella was invited to replace him, which he accepted, remaining with Sepultura until 2011. In 2014 he start up a new band, called Ego Kill Talent. In this band, he plays the drums and the guitar.

== Discography ==
- Diesel - Diesel (2000)
- Udora - Liberty Square (2005)
- Andreas Kisser - Hubris I & II (2009)
- Sepultura - A-Lex (2009)
- Sepultura - Kairos (2011)
- Ego Kill Talent - Ego Kill Talent (2017)
- Ego Kill Talent - The Dance Between Extremes (2021)
