= El show de los sueños (Peruvian TV series) season 2 =

El show de los sueños
- Season 2
- Celebrity winner: Anna Carina
- Professional winner: Carlos Suárez; Gabriela Noguera
- No. of episodes: 12

Release
- Original network: América Televisión
- Original release: August 22, 2009 – November 7, 2019

El Show de los Sueños: Amigos del alma was the second season of the Peruvian reality show El show de los sueños. In this season, every team (conformed by a celebrity and two best friends) should dance and sing. The winners were Anna Carina, Carlos (dancer) and Gabriela (singer).

== Cast ==
=== Teams ===
| Celebrity | Notability (known for) | Dreamers | Status |
|---|---|---|---|
| Cecilia Tait | Former volleyball player & politician | Felix Reyes & Otoniel Ríos | Eliminated 1st September 5, 2009 |
| Cristian Zuárez | Singer | Betsy Martínez & Renzo Vásquez | Eliminated 2nd September 19, 2009 |
| Rodrigo Sánchez Patiño | Actor & TV host | Julliana Villacorta & Malena Ruiz Caro | Eliminated 3rd September 26, 2009 |
| Anahí de Cárdenas | Actress, singer & model | Francis Medrano & Giovanni Nésterez | Eliminated 4th October 3, 2009 |
| Karen Dejo | TV host & actress | Robert Chumpitaz & Erick Cuadros | Eliminated 5th October 24, 2009 |
| Julinho | Former football player & TV host | Franz Ato & Silvia Pacheco | Eliminated 6th October 31, 2009 |
| Marco Zunino | Actor & singer | Johana Zeballos & Diana Quispe | Eliminated 7th November 7, 2009 |
| Christian Domínguez | Singer & actor | Julissa Vásquez & Isabel Abensur | Eliminated 8th November 7, 2009 |
| Maricielo Effio | Actress & dancer | Charles Ramírez & Luis Miguel Huarcaya | Third place November 7, 2009 |
| Jean Paul Strauss | Singer-songwriter & producer | Katherine Mendoza & Luis Baca | Runner-up; November 7, 2009 |
| Anna Carina | Singer-songwriter & guitarist | Carlos Suárez & Gabriela Noriega | Winners; November 7, 2009 |

== Scoring charts ==
| Team | Place | 1 | 2 | 3 | 4 | 5 | 6 | 7 | 8 | 9 | 10 | 11 | 12 | |
| Team | Place | 1 | 2 | 3 | 4 | 5 | 6 | 7 | 8 | 9 | 10 | 11 | 1 | 2 |
|---|---|---|---|---|---|---|---|---|---|---|---|---|---|---|
| Anna Carina, Carlos & Gabriela | 1 | 75 | 70 | 75 | 79 | 77 | 77 | 81 | 114 | 81 | 80 | 75 | 39 | 79 |
| Jean Paul, Katherine & Luis | 2 | 72 | 72 | 69 | 70 | 71 | 75 | 76 | 107 | 82 | 66 | 74 | 35 | 78 |
| Maricielo, Charles & Luis Miguel | 3 | 75 | 68 | 68 | 70 | 74 | 76 | 76 | 114 | 79 | 70 | 80 | 36 | 76 |
| Christian, Julissa & Isabel | 4 | 66 | 67 | 72 | 70 | 82 | 71 | 76 | 105 | 79 | 74 | 75 | 32 | 72 |
| Marco, Johana & Diana | 5 | 71 | 65 | 73 | 68 | 75 | 74 | 75 | 103 | 78 | 67 | 73 | 33 | |
| Julinho, Silvia & Franz | 6 | 61 | 57 | 64 | 71 | 68 | 61 | 66 | 94 | 69 | 57 | 63 | | |
| Karen, Robert & Erick | 7 | 67 | 72 | 68 | 66 | 62 | 73 | 73 | 104 | 67 | 67 | | | |
| Anahí, Francis & Giovanni | 8 | 71 | 73 | 70 | 70 | 71 | 70 | 77 | | | | | | |
| Rodrigo, Julliana & Malena | 9 | 67 | 62 | 70 | 65 | 67 | 71 | | | | | | | |
| Cristian, Betsy & Renzo | 10 | 62 | 61 | 63 | 63 | 61 | | | | | | | | |
| Cecilia, Félix & Otoniel | 11 | 68 | 56 | 66 | | | | | | | | | | |

=== Average score chart ===
This table only counts performances scored on a 40-point scale.

| Rank by average | Place | Team | Total points | Number of performances | Average |
|---|---|---|---|---|---|
| 1 | 1 | Anna Carina, Carlos & Gabriela | 990 | 26 | 38.08 |
| 2 | 3 | Maricielo, Charles & Luis Miguel | 953 | 26 | 36.65 |
| 3 | 2 | Jean Paul, Katherine & Luis | 933 | 26 | 35.88 |
| 4 | 4 | Christian, Julissa & Isabel | 931 | 26 | 35.81 |
| 5 | 8 | Anahí, Francis & Giovanni | 498 | 14 | 35.57 |
| 6 | 5 | Marco, Johana & Diana | 843 | 24 | 35.13 |
| 7 | 7 | Karen, Robert & Erick | 712 | 21 | 33.90 |
| 8 | 9 | Rodrigo, Julliana & Malena | 400 | 12 | 33.33 |
| 9 | 11 | Cecilia, Félix & Otoniel | 190 | 6 | 31.67 |
| 10 | 6 | Julinho, Silvia & Franz | 725 | 23 | 31.52 |
| 11 | 10 | Cristian, Betsy & Renzo | 310 | 10 | 31.00 |

=== Highest and lowest scoring ===
The highest and lowest scores are based on the 40-point scale.

| Couple | Highest scoring(s) | Lowest scoring(s) |
|---|---|---|
| Anna Carina, Carlos & Gabriela | Salsa, Ballad, Guaracha, Pachanga, Latin pop & Ballad (40) | Reggaeton (33) |
| Jean Paul, Katherine & Luis | Pachanga, Soft rock, Criollo & Ballad (40) | Paso doble (32) |
| Maricielo, Charles & Luis Miguel | Pachanga, Guaracha & Jive (40) | Pop latino (30) |
| Christian, Julissa & Isabel | Soul (40) | Ballad (30) |
| Marco, Johana & Diana | Latin pop (39) | Merengue (32) |
| Julinho, Silvia & Franz | Latin pop (37) | Salsa (27) |
| Karen, Robert & Erick | Salsa (38) | Latin pop (26) |
| Anahí, Francis & Giovanni | Salsa (39) | Ballad (31) |
| Rodrigo, Julliana & Malena | Salsa (38) | Merengue (29) |
| Cristian, Betsy & Renzo | Latin pop (33) | Cumbia (29) |
| Cecilia, Félix & Otoniel | Street (35) | Merengue (26) |
