= Love Star =

- Origin: Los Angeles, California, US
- Genres: Electropop, Latin
- Years active: 2010–present
- Members: Starla (alias Adriana Fernández Arias); The Doctor (alias William Ferreira Alves III)
- Website: http://www.lovestarband.com

Love Star is a bilingual electropop duo formed by Mexican singer Adriana Fernandez Arias (Starla), and Los Angeles guitarist William Ferreira Alves III (The Doctor). The group formed in Los Angeles in 2010 and their debut EP Happiness included the iTunes Download of the Week in the US and Mexico single, "Felicidad".

Their brand of Latin-influenced electropop has earned them recognition by major publications including People en Español and El Mexicano among others.

The success of their debut EP has allowed them to tour extensively, performing shows at the Museum of Latin American Art, Fiesta en la Calle 2012, and sharing the stage with major acts such as Dave Navarro, Los Prisioneros and Tommy Lee.

On April 14, 2015, the duo released “Capítulo 1” the first chapter of their second album Espectro, which was produced, recorded, and mixed by 16-time Grammy Award winner Thom Russo, known for his work with artists such as Michael Jackson, Jay-Z, Enrique Iglesias, Maná and Juanes among others. Espectro featured the singles "Busco", and "Respirar".

The official video for "Busco", reached 120,000 views in its first month.

== Press ==
- Indie, Código. "The Retrovision + Love Star - Código CDMX". Archived from the original on April 17, 2015.
- México, Setlist. "Love Star nos hará vibrar con su rock electrónico".
- Terra, Entretenimiento. "Love Star debutará en México con canciones de amor y esperanzadoras".
- Veracruzanos, Notimex. "Love Star debutará en México con canciones de amor y esperanzadoras - Veracruzanos.info". Archived from the original on April 17, 2015.
- Ortega, Giovanni. "Love Star presenta el Capítulo I de su disco Espectro".
- "Electro-Rock Duo Love Star Releasing New EP".
- Aguilar, Angel (December 11, 2014). "Love Star Debuts New Music".
- Elástica, La Banda. "LoveStar: De estreno!".
- Aguilar, Angel. "LOVE STAR ESTRENA ALBUM".
