= Quiero Contigo =

Single by Anna Carina
- English title: "I Want to with You"
- Released: June 1, 2018
- Genre: Latin Pop
- Length: 3:11
- Label: 11y11, Sony Music Latin
- Songwriters: Anna Carina; Ender Thomas; Mario Cáceres; "Wahin" Pinto
- Producers: Ender Thomas; Mario Cáceres; "Wahin" Pinto

Anna Carina singles chronology
"Hipocresía" (2014)	"Quiero Contigo" (2018)	"Callao" (2019)

Music video
- "Quiero Contigo" on YouTube

"Quiero Contigo" is a song by Peruvian singer Anna Carina released by 11y11 Records as the lead single of her upcoming studio album.

== Background and release ==
The song's lyrics were written by Anna Carina and Mario Cáceres while the music was composed by Ender Thomas and "Wahin" Pinto. The song was released on June 1, 2018 along with a lyric video. Following the release of the song's music video, the song topped the iTunes charts in Perú.

== Commercial performance ==
The song had big success in Perú reaching the airplay charts there as well as the top of the Peruvian iTunes sales charts. The video reached 13 million views in just 3 months of its release, so Anna Carina embarked on her "Tour Quiero Contigo" throughout Perú in order to promote the song.

== Music video ==
The music video for the song was released on July 13, 2018 on Anna Carina's official YouTube channel. The video was filmed in La Punta, Callao and features Anna Carina's older sister María Pía Copello who is a well known Peruvian children's television host. The video surpassed 1 million views in just 4 days and it's currently Anna Carina's most viewed video to date with over 30 million views.

== Charts ==
=== Weekly charts ===
Chart (2018)	Peak position
Perú (Monitor Latino)	18

=== Year-end charts ===
Chart (2019)	Position
Perú Pop (Monitor Latino)	78
