= Anna Carina =

Peruvian pop singer (born 1981)

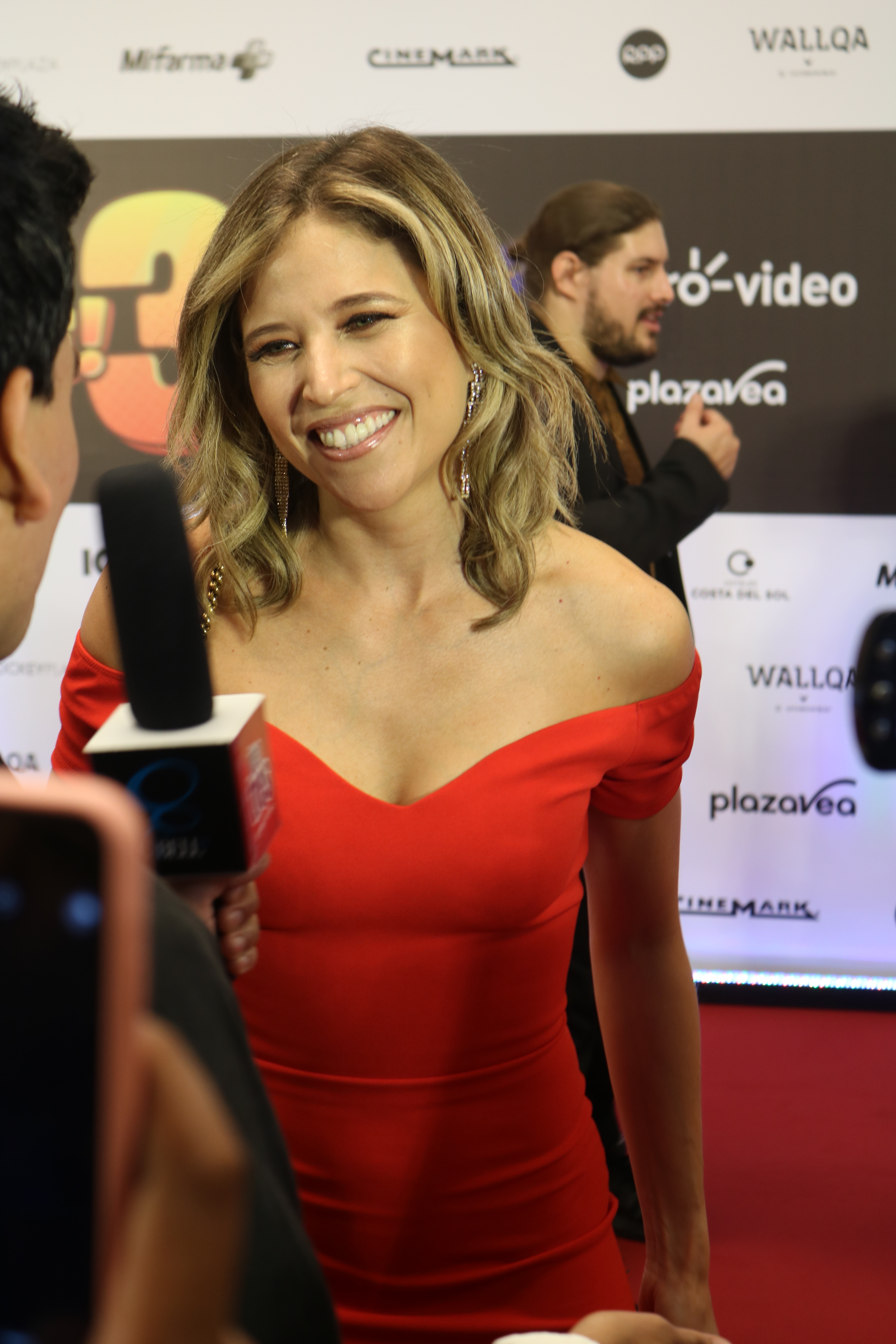
- Carina in 2018

Background information
- Born: Anna Carina Copello Hora; 14 August 1981 (age 45)
- Origin: Lima, Peru
- Genres: Pop; Latin; Pop rock; Ballad; Urban Pop
- Occupation: Singer
- Labels: Independent; Sony Music
- Website: annacarina.net

Anna Carina Copello Hora (born 14 August 1981) is a Peruvian pop singer. In 2010, she was nominated for the Premios Orgullosamente Latino: Soloist of the Year, Latin Song of the Year, Latin album of the Year, and Video of the Year. She has been dubbed the "Queen of Peruvian pop".

== Biography ==
Anna Carina Copello Hora was born in Lima on 14 August 1981. She is the younger sister of Peruvian children's television animator María Pía Copello. Since participating in the program Nubeluz, Anna Carina was cementing a career that has gradually made important achievements.

She has also collaborated with her compositions in various charity campaigns carried out in Peru, but without neglecting her main goal: her solo career. In 1998 she represented Perú at the Viña del Mar International Song Festival with the song "Hay Un Modo" composed by Pedro Suárez-Vértiz and finished in second place in the International competition. She represented Peru in the OTI Festival 2000 with the song "Un planeta, un corazón". In 2002, Anna Carina launched what would become her first solo musical experience. The album was titled Algo Personal, a disc with 16 compositions, all walking along the lines of pop, rock, ballads and dance. The album included the song "Hay Un Modo" which she sang when she represented Perú in Viña del Mar.

The first single, Crazy Love, was able to quickly penetrate the taste of young audiences, placing it in the preference lists of the major local radio stations. While Anna Carina toured various venues featuring the best of his repertoire. The address of the video was provided by Juan Carlos Oganes.

The record was short-lived and Anna Carina had to leave the stage for a couple of years in this period of personal growth, began to compose songs for children's program called "Maria Pia & Timoteo".

In 2003, Anna Carina began to conceive the concept of the second disc. Alongside came the opportunity to VJ on the channel's most popular music of Peru, OK TV, enabling him to keep abreast of new music.

Launched in 2005, the disc Espiral contains 10 tracks and it shows the entire growth as an artist, both in the lyrics of songs like the musical arrangements. The disc has two sides, unlike the above, the tracks sound just pop and rock only. Experiences of life and breath to succeed, thoughts, loves and hates, all in a tone very liberating, in particular Anna Carina seal.

On 14 July Anna Carina informed of their new album AnnaCarinaPop well with the name that has dominated the pop title with some mergers of different rhythms inspired by 80. The album was released on 15 June 2010, the first single was Cielo Sin Luz which was released in March and was successful both nationally and internationally. Also in March it was announced the second single from the album which is titled Ya Fue Demasiado. At the end of that same year she received a Premio Esmeralda Musical (Musical Emerald Award), awarded by Asociación Peruana de Autores y Compositores (APDAYC) for her 2005 hit Más Allá De Ti.

In 2014 she started releasing singles for her fifth album "Sola Y Bien Acompañada" which came out in 2015. Around that same time, she became pregnant again after 12 years since she became a mom. Since then she has released a few singles in an urban pop style that are said to be included in her next studio album. She is currently signed with Sony Music. In 2019 she was nominated for Singer of the Year at the Premios Fama where her song Callao was also nominated for Best Pop/Urban Song.

In May 2020 she was diagnosed with COVID-19. A month later she confirmed via Instagram that she had beaten the virus.

In September, she did a cameo in the music video for her sister's, María Pía Copello, debut single Like in which also starred her niece and mom. A month later she released her latest hit single Dame Tu Cariño in collaboration with Colombian singer Gusi.

== Discography ==
=== Albums ===
- Algo Personal (2002)
- Espiral (2005)
- AnnaCarinaPop (2010)
- Anna Carina & Diego Dibós cantan en Navidad (2011)
- Anna Carina & Diego Dibós cantan en Navidad (2012 Reissue)
- Sola Y Bien Acompañada (2015)

=== Singles ===
- "Hay Un Modo" (1998) (Runner-up at the Viña del Mar International Song Festival representing Perú)
- "Loco Amor" (2002)
- "Dime" (2005)
- "Más allá de ti" (2005)
- "Solo un segundo" (2005)
- "Cielo sin luz" (2010)
- "Ya fue demasiado" (2010)
- "Dime si esto es amor" (2011)
- "Me cansé" (2012)
- "Aquí" with Shaw y Sandra Muente (2012)
- "Me voy contigo" (2013)
- "Amándote" featuring Jandy Feliz (2014)
- "Hipocresía" featuring Kalimba (2014)
- "Quiero Contigo" (2018)
- "Callao" (2019)
- "Dónde Están" with ChocQuibTown (2019)
- "Unidos" with Jaze (2020)
- "Dame Tu Cariño" with Gusi (2020)
- "Amarme" (2020) with Isabel Pinedo
- "Nocivo" (2021)
- "Sin Sentido" (2022) with Kalimba
- "Cha Cha Cha" (2022)
- "Tú y Yo" (2023) with Reggi El Auténtico
- "Tu Amor Me Duele" (2024) with Corazón Serrano
- "Solita" (2024) with Explosión De Iquitos
- "Prohibido" (2025) with La Única Tropical
- "Para Mí" (2026)

== TV shows ==
1. El show de los sueños (Perú): Amigos del alma – Heroin.. Winner / 1st Place
2. El show de los sueños: Reyes del show – 2nd Place
3. Vidas Extremas (with Jean Paul Strauss)
4. Nubeluz (Dicolina/Cindela)
