= Ah, Ah, Ah =

- Original 1991 cover

Studio album by Arena Hash
- Released: 1991
- Recorded: 1989–1990
- Studios: Estudios Amigos, Lima
- Genre: Rock
- Length: 38:32
- Label: SonoSur
- Producer: Manuel Garrido-Lecca

Arena Hash chronology
Arena Hash (1988)	Ah, Ah, Ah (1991)	Del Archivo de... Arena Hash (1995)

Singles from Ah, Ah, Ah
- 1. "El rey del ah, ah, ah" Released: 1991; 2. "Y es que sucede así" Released: 1991; 3. "A ese infierno no voy a volver" Released: 1991; 4. "¿Cómo te va, mi amor?" Released: 1991

Ah, Ah, Ah is the second and last studio album of the Peruvian rock band, Arena Hash. The album was released in 1991 by SonoSur. A revised edition of the album was released by Discos Independientes after its success. It featured a rock and pop genre, a shift from ska and new wave from the bands first album. Ah, Ah, Ah became one of the most popular rock album in Peru.

== Production ==
The album was recorded at the Estudios Amigos in Lima and mixed at Black Cat Studios in Miami. It was produced by Manuel Garrido-Lecca with Keith Morrison overseeing recording. The album was released on CD and cassette and a new version of the album was released after its success. It was re-released on December 31, 2021, as a vinyl.

According to Christian Meier, as part of their partnership with SonoSur and Manuel Garrido-Lecca, Arena Hash had the opportunity to film three promotional videos for the album. The three music videos created were, "El rey del ah, ah, ah", "Y es que sucede así" and "A ese infierno no voy a volver". In addition to the three original music videos, independently made videos of "El túnel del bus" and a second version of "A ese infierno no voy a volver".

== Critical reception ==
The album became one of the most popular in Peru during its release. It was originally released on cassette by the SonoSur, but due to fan demand and the band's great reception, a CD edition with new cover art was released by Discos Independientes. A vinyl edition that was released in 2021 is currently available from Disco Centro Records, presented in four colors: red and black splatter, white and pink splatter, multicolor, and black vinyl. All include an insert with previously unreleased photos and lyrics.

The single "Y es que sucede así" was featured in the 2017 Peruvian film Av. Larco. It would place number one on numerous Peruvian radio stations and became the most popular song. "¿Cómo te va, mi amor?", "El rey del ah, ah, ah" and "A ese infierno no voy a volver" would rank high in Peru as well and were also very successful.

The songs "¿Cómo te va, mi amor?", "El túnel del bus" and "A ese infierno no voy a volver" were listed among the 12 most essential songs in Pedro Suárez-Vértiz' career.

== Track listing ==
All songs written by Pedro Suárez-Vértiz, except when noted.

No.	Title	Writer(s)	Length
1.	"Y es que sucede así"		3:44
2.	"Materialismo sexual"	Pedro Suárez Vértiz, Patricio Suárez Vértiz	3:55
3.	"El túnel del bus"	Pedro Suárez Vértiz, Arturo Pomar Jr., Patricio Suárez Vértiz	4:35
4.	"El rey del ah, ah, ah"		3:51
5.	"Bésame"	Pedro Suárez Vértiz, Patricio Suárez Vértiz	3:41
6.	"Quiero vivir tal vez sin amor"	Christian Meier	3:06
7.	"Murciélago rodrigo"		3:20
8.	"Volar, Volar"		3:11
9.	"A ese infierno no voy a volver"	Pedro Suárez Vértiz, Arturo Pomar Jr., Patricio Suárez Vértiz	3:28
10.	"¿Cómo te va, mi amor?"		5:39

== Personnel ==
Arena Hash

- Pedro Suárez-Vértiz – lead vocals, guitars
- Christian Meier – keyboards, backing vocals
- Patricio Suárez-Vértiz – bass, backing vocals
- Arturo Pomar Jr. – drums, percussion, backing vocals

Technical

- Manuel Garrido-Lecca – producer, keyboards
- Keith Morrison – mixer

Additional personnel

- Brian Monroney – guitars
- Freddy Neira – keyboards
- Luis Felipe Cueto – design
- Carlos Ramos – design
