= Dame Tu Cariño =

Single by Anna Carina and Gusi
- English title: "Give Me Your Love"
- Released: October 2, 2020
- Genre: Latin pop, ballad, cumbia
- Length: 3:23
- Label: 11y11, Sony Music
- Songwriters: Anna Carina; Gusi
- Producer: Andrés Castro

Anna Carina singles chronology
"Unidos" (2020)	"Dame Tu Cariño" (2020)	"Amarme" (2021)

Gusi singles chronology
"Regresando" (2020)	"Dame Tu Cariño" (2020)	"Ojalá" (2020)

Music video
- "Dame Tu Cariño" on YouTube

"Dame Tu Cariño" is a song by Peruvian singer Anna Carina with Colombian singer Gusi, released by 11y11 Records as the fifth single of her upcoming album.

== Background and release ==
The song was released on October 2, 2020 although Anna Carina had dedicated the song to her husband on the day of their marriage, she was waiting for the perfect moment to release it. The song was co-written by Anna Carina and Gusi. This marked Anna Carina's return to music after being away while battling against Covid-19. She did a YouTube live concert for October 24, 2020 to promote the song. The concert included a guest appearance from Gusi (who is her duet partner in the song) as a guest appearances from well known Peruvian singers Daniela Darcourt, Eva Ayllón, and Gian Marco. Anna Carina said that the release of the song and the concert are ways to promote her album which she is working on with plans for release in 2021. The song entered the top ten in the pop charts in Perú.

== Music video ==
The music video for the single was released on the same day as the song and features both singers singing in white backgrounds while the scene changes onto video images of different weddings including Anna Carina's actual wedding.

== Charts ==
Chart (2020)	Peak position
Perú Pop (Monitor Latino)	6
