= Amándote (Anna Carina song) =

Single by Anna Carina featuring Jandy Feliz

from the album Sola Y Bien Acompañada
- English title: "Loving You"
- Released: February 26, 2014
- Genre: Bachata
- Length: 3:23
- Label: 11y11, Sony Music
- Songwriters: Anna Carina; Gusi
- Producer: Andrés Castro

Anna Carina singles chronology
"Me Voy Contigo" (2013)	"Amándote" (2014)	"Hipocresía" (2014)

Jandy Feliz singles chronology
"Metete" (2010)	"Amándote" (2014)	"Cada Loco Con Su Tema" (2016)

Music video
- "Amándote" on YouTube

"Amándote" is a song by Peruvian singer Anna Carina with Dominican singer Jandy Feliz, released by 11y11 Records as the lead single of her fifth studio album Sola Y Bien Acompañada.

== Background and release ==
The song was released on February 26, 2014. Anna Carina also recorded a solo version of the song which is included on the album. The song is a Bachata song that follows the latin rhythms from Anna Carina's previous single Me Voy Contigo and reached the top spot on the iTunes chart in Perú. The song was written by Anna Carina and produced by Andrés Castro who has worked with big names in the music industry such as Carlos Vives, Prince Royce, Carlos Baute, and Thalía. The song also received lots of airplay in Perú where it entered the charts and was the 88th most played song on the tropical radio in 2019, five years after its release. To this day the song is still in the Digital Songs Chart in Perú published by UNIMPRO.

== Music video ==
The music video for the single was released on the same day as the song and features both singers in the studio recording the song.

== Track listing ==
- Digital download and streaming
1. "Amándote" (featuring Jandy Feliz) – 3:23
2. "Amándote" (Solo version) – 3:22

== Charts ==
=== Year-end charts ===
Chart (2014)	Peak position
Perú Airplay (APDAYC)	102

Chart (2019)	Peak position
Perú Tropical (Monitor Latino)	88
