= Callao (song) =

Single by Anna Carina
- English title: "Quiet"
- Released: January 11, 2019
- Genre: Latin Pop
- Length: 3:03
- Label: 11y11, Sony Music
- Songwriters: Anna Carina; Oscarcito; Antonio Barullo; Dale Play
- Producer: Dale Play

Anna Carina singles chronology
"Quiero Contigo" (2018)	"Callao" (2019)	"Dónde Están" (2019)

Music video
- "Callao" on YouTube

"Callao" is a song by Peruvian singer Anna Carina released by 11y11 Records as the second single of her upcoming album.

== Background and release ==
The song was released on January 11, 2019 along with a lyric video and was written by Anna Carina along with Oscarcito, Antonio Barullo, and Dale Play who are known for composing for big acts such as Thalía and Jennifer Lopez. Although the song's title is the same, it's not referring to the Peruvian providence of Callao, but instead to the verb of being quiet. The song topped the iTunes charts in Perú just a few hours after its release. The song also peaked inside the top 20 in the general airplay chart and top 3 in the pop airplay chart in Perú.

== Live performances ==
Anna Carina performed the song on several television shows in order to promote it but most notably on Wantan Night which is co-hosted by her sister María Pía Copello.

== Music video ==
The music video was released on February 28, 2019 on Anna Carina's official YouTube channel. It shows Anna Carina singing while dancing at the beach and having a beach party. The video includes cameos from several stars including Yo Soy judge Katia Palma. The video was shot in Miami and was choreographed by Anna Carina along with her sister María Pía Copello, who appeared in the video for her previous single and is a Peruvian children's television host.

== Charts ==
=== Weekly charts ===
Chart (2019)	Peak position
Perú (Monitor Latino)	19
Perú Pop (Monitor Latino)	3

=== Year-end charts ===
Chart (2019)	Position
Perú Pop (Monitor Latino)	16

== Awards and nominations ==
The song was nominated for Best Pop/Urban Song at the Premios Fama in 2019. It was also nominated for Hit of the Year at the Premios Luces in 2019.

Year	Awards Ceremony	Category	Result
2019	Premios Fama	Best Pop/Urban Song	Nominated
2019	Premios Luces	Hit of the Year	Nominated
