= Espiral =

Studio album by Anna Carina
- Released: March 5, 2005
- Recorded: 2004
- Genre: Latin pop, rock
- Language: Spanish
- Label: 11 y 11 Discos

Anna Carina chronology
Algo Personal (2002)	Espiral (2005)	AnnaCarinaPop (2010)

Singles from Espiral
- 1. "Más Allá De Ti" Released: 2005; 2. "Dime" Released: 2005; 3. "Solo Un Segundo" Released: 2005

Espiral is the second studio album by Peruvian singer Anna Carina released on March 5, 2005 by the independent label 11 y 11 discos.

== Background and release ==
The album was released in 2005 and contains ten songs all written by Anna Carina. This album is closer to the rock genre, exploring the sounds of acoustic and electric guitars, bass, and drums. However, she does not leave out pop and melodic ballads.

== Promotion ==
Three songs were released as singles in order to promote the album. These songs were well received by the public and got Anna Carina to debut on international music chains such as MTV, HTV, and Ritmoson Latino as well as the local television networks in Perú.

== Track listing ==
All credits adapted from Anna Carina's Official Website and Apple Music.

No.	Title	Length
1.	"Más Allá De Ti"	3:46
2.	"Dime"	3:51
3.	"Noches Frías"	4:03
4.	"Soló Un Segundo"	5:02
5.	"Nunca Más"	4:01
6.	"Punto Final"	4:16
7.	"Espiral"	3:55
8.	"Se Va"	3:51
9.	"Vives En Mí"	4:10
10.	"Respirar"	4:03

== Accolades ==
Premios Luces El Comercio

Year	Nominee / work	Award	Result
2005	Espiral	Best Pop Album	Nominated
