= Póntelo en la lengua =

Studio album by Pedro Suárez-Vértiz
- Released: September 17, 1996
- Recorded: 1995–1996
- Studios: Estudios Amigos (Lima); Kokopelli Sound (Miami); Fuller Sound (Miami)
- Genres: Pop rock, latin rock
- Length: 53:34
- Label: Sony Music
- Producer: Manuel Garrido-Lecca

Pedro Suárez-Vértiz chronology
| (No existen) Técnicas Para Olvidar (1993) | Póntelo en la lengua (1996) | Degeneración Actual (1999) |

Singles from Póntelo en la lengua
- 1. "Me estoy enamorando" Released: July 8, 1996; 2. "Los globos del cielo" Released: November 18, 1996; 3. "Sé que todo ha acabado ya" Released: January 6, 1997; 4. "Sentimiento increíble" Released: March 10, 1997; 5. "Te siento de sólo pensar" Released: 28 April, 1997; 6. "Mi auto era una rana" Released: June 2, 1997

Póntelo en la lengua (English: ''Put it on the tongue'') is the second studio album by the Peruvian singer-songwriter, Pedro Suárez-Vértiz. It was released on 17 September, 1996, by Sony Music, produced by Manuel Garrido-Lecca. It is the most successful album of Suárez-Vértiz's career, becoming well received in Peru and throughout Latin America. It was also the first major international hit of the artist.

The album was seen as Suárez-Vértiz's return to carefully produced pop rock, diverging from his previous alternative rock albums. The album made him the biggest rockstar in the country. Five songs were released for nationwide radio rotation, and numerous radio stations fought over exclusivity rights to "Me estoy enamorando". The album shifted Peruvian mainstream rock music from reggae and cultural fusion rock, towards pop rock.

Six singles were released to promote the album. Many of the songs featured were adapted from drafts created by Suárez-Vértiz in earlier years, such as the hit single, "Me estoy enamorando", which became number one on radio charts in Chile and Peru. Additionally, ''Los globos del cielo" was ranked 14 in the Billboard's, The 25 Timeless Masterpieces of Rock in Spanish. Since its release, it has become the best-selling album in Peruvian rock history.

== Production ==
Recording of Póntelo en lengua began in early 1995, at the Estudios Amigos in Lima, with Saúl Cornejo as recording engineer. Recording shifted to Miami in the United States, in 1996 at the Kokopelli Sound and Fuller Sound Studios, where most of the album was mixed. This shift to the United States was part of Suárez-Vértiz's focus on a radio-oriented pop rock album. Póntelo en la Lengua was produced by Manuel Garrido-Lecca, a frequent collaborator of Pedro, with Cucho Peñaloza and Robelo Calderón as executive producers.

With Garrido-Lecca, Suárez-Vértiz experimented for the first time, looping and sampling within his songs. This was also accomplished with sampler Miguel Reátegui. This was first done on the hit single, "Mi auto era una rana".

Sony Music intended to expand Suárez-Vértiz's music internationally, starting with Póntelo en la Lengua. Before the international release of the album, promotion of the albums singles was needed through music videos. The single "Me estoy enamorando" was recorded in Bogotá, while "Los globos del cielo" was recorded in Santiago. The day before recording the music video for "Me estoy enamorando", Pedro bought a 1961 Gibson Melody Maker. A music video of "Mi auto era una rana" were also produced.

== Commercial performance ==
In its release year 1996, it sold 18,000 copies, becoming certified platinum in Peru. After its international release in 1997, it sold 40,000 copies. It has been recorded to have sold 100,000 total copies since its release, becoming the best-selling album in Peru.

A second edition of the album, available in vinyl, will be released on December 15, 2026, to commemorate 30 years of the album.

== Critical reception ==
Professional ratings
Review scores
| Source | Rating |
|---|---|
| Rate Your Music | 2.93/5 stars |

The album was received well by the majority of the Peruvian public, becoming one of the best selling albums in Peruvian history. In a column for the magazine Caleta however, Luis Palomino named it the worst album of the year, writing that the lyrics on several tracks were repulsive. Regardless, Póntelo en la lengua became the most popular album in Suárez-Vértiz's career, and becoming his most successful internationally, most notably in Chile. Numerous songs were featured in Latin American media. "Mi auto era una rana" was featured in the Peruvian film, No se lo digas a nadie, and "Me estoy enamorando" was the theme song for the Chilean show, A Todo Dar, in 1998. The single also placed number one in Chile and Peru.

The single, ''Los globos del cielo'', was ranked 14 in the Billboard magazine for The 25 Timeless Masterpieces of Rock in Spanish in 2020. In 2013, the songs "Sé que todo ha acabado ya" and "Podré cambiar" were listed among the 12 most essential songs in Suárez-Vértiz' career.

In 2026, the second edition of the album, available in vinyl, will be released celebrating its 30 year anniversary. The new edition features new visualizers, based on public vote of the albums greatest hits.

== Track listing ==
All songs were composed by Pedro Suárez-Vértiz.

| No. | Title | Length |
|---|---|---|
| 1. | "Mi auto era una rana" | 3:58 |
| 2. | "El arbol" | 4:51 |
| 3. | "Los globos del cielo" | 3:58 |
| 4. | "Una vez una flor" | 4:12 |
| 5. | "Te siento de sólo pensar" | 3:23 |
| 6. | "Me estoy enamorando" | 4:46 |
| 7. | "Podré cambiar" | 4:12 |
| 8. | "La vida me sabe a nada" | 3:18 |
| 9. | "Pasear en bicicleta" | 4:09 |
| 10. | "Sé que todo ha acabado ya" | 3:28 |
| 11. | "Sentimiento increíble" | 3:29 |
| 12. | "La niña bella" | 3:47 |
| 13. | "Me siento Mejor" | 3:48 |
| 14. | "Post data (bonus track)" | 2:15 |

== Certifications and sales ==
| Region | Certification | Certified units/sales |
|---|---|---|
| Perú (UNIMPRO) | 3× Platinum | 100,000 |

== Personnel ==
- Pedro Suárez-Vértiz – lead vocals, acoustic guitar, electric guitar, backing vocals, keyboard, piano, harmonica, flute
- Arturo Pomar Jr. – drums, backing vocals
- Carlos Beraún – backing vocals, piano
- Pepe Criado – backing vocals, bass
- Patricio Suárez-Vértiz – bass
- Stuart Jean – drums
- Lucho Nuñez – electric guitar
- Germán Gonzáles – percussion
- Hugo Bravo – percussion
- Gonzálo Polar – saxophone
- Abel Páez – trumpet
- Rolando Gonzáles Saba – trombone
- Freddy Neira – piano
- Christian Meier – backing vocals
- Nina Mutal – backing vocals
- Anna Carina Copello – backing vocals

Produced by Manuel Garrido-Lecca
