= No Me Acuerdo Quien Fuí =

Studio album by Christian Meier
- Released: July 23, 1996
- Recorded: 1995–1996
- Genre: Latin pop, rock
- Language: Spanish
- Label: Roma Records
- Producer: Christian Meier

Christian Meier chronology
No Me Acuerdo Quien Fuí (1996)	Primero En Mojarme (1999)

Singles from No Me Acuerdo Quien Fuí
- 1. "Carreteras Mojadas" Released: February 23, 1996; 2. "Esa Sí Es Una Mujer" Released: April 15, 1996; 3. "Frente A Mis Ojos" Released: May 13, 1996; 4. "No Me Acuerdo Quien Fuí" Released: July 15, 1996; 5. "Tus Huellas Entre Las Mías" Released: November 18, 1996

No Me Acuerdo Quien Fuí (English: "I Don't Remember Who I Was") is the debut studio album by Peruvian singer-songwriter Christian Meier released in 1996 by his own record company Roma Records. The album's lead single Carreteras Mojadas was released in February 1996 and became a huge hit in Perú to the point that 25 years later, it's still as relevant as it was when it was released.

== Commercial performance ==
The album had great success in Perú being certified double platinum. The singles from the album all had airplay success in Perú reaching the top spot on several radio stations. The most successful single from the album was "Carreteras Mojadas", which topped the airplay charts for 5 weeks in Perú and became the most played song of 1996 in the country. In 2021 Meier uploaded the music videos of the album's singles to his official YouTube channel to celebrate the 25th anniversary of the album's release.

== Critical reception ==
Professional ratings
Review scores
Source	Rating
Rate Your Music	2.86/5 stars

The album was well received in Perú having several hits on the radio, selling thousands of copies, and being certified gold & multi-platinum. It received a 2.75 star rating on Rate Your Music.

== Track listing ==
All credits adapted from Discogs.

No.	Title	Length
1.	"Intro"	1:26
2.	"Carreteras Mojadas"	4:29
3.	"Tus Huellas Entre Las Mías"	4:33
4.	"No Me Acuerdo Quien Fuí"	3:46
5.	"Esa Si Es Una Mujer" (featuring Pedro Suárez-Vértiz)	3:51
6.	"El Cielo Es Mayor"	4:08
7.	"Sere Lo Que Quieras Que Sea"	2:55
8.	"Frente A Mis Ojos"	3:14
9.	"Vuelves A Aparecer"	3:49
10.	"Profundo Sueño"	4:10
11.	"Lenguas De Fuego"	4:42

== Certifications and sales ==
Region	Certification	Certified units/sales
Perú (IFPI)	2× Platinum	20,000
