= Aj Zombies! =

- Film poster
- Directed by: Daniel Martín Rodríguez
- Written by: Pablo Carrillo; Gonzalo Rodríguez Risco; Bruno Rosina
- Produced by: Clementine Gayet; Ruben Goldfarb; Catou Lairet; Daniel Martín Rodríguez; Javier Salvador; Diego Vega Jenkins
- Starring: Emilram Cossío; Anahí de Cárdenas
- Cinematography: Julián Estrada
- Edited by: Humberto Barzola
- Music by: Julián Estrada
- Production companies: StudioCanal; La Pepa
- Release dates: October 2017 (Mórbido Fest); October 10, 2019 (Peru)
- Running time: 80 minutes
- Country: Peru
- Language: Spanish

Aj Zombies! (also known: Aj Zombies! La película, lit. 'Aj Zombies! The Movie') is a 2017 Peruvian adventure comedy horror film directed by Daniel Martín Rodríguez, financed by StudioCanal. The film is based on the web series of the same name, starring Emilram Cossío and Anahí de Cárdenas.

== Synopsis ==
While the world falls into chaos due to a zombie infestation that began in Peru, Claudia and Felipe, accompanied by a drunkard and security guard, will understand that their love is possible.

== Cast ==
- Emilram Cossío as Felipe
- Anahí de Cárdenas as Claudia
- César Ritter as Arias
- Miguel Iza as The drunk
- Liliana Trujillo as Santitos
- Pietro Sibille as Collector
- Alicia Mercado as Daughter Road
- Julián Legaspi as Journalist

== Release ==
Aj Zombies! had its international premiere in October 2017 at Mórbido Fest 2017. Subsequently, the trailer for the film was released on YouTube, quickly reaching 3 million views, and then premiered on October 10, 2019, in Peruvian cinemas.
