= AnnaCarinaPop =

Studio album by Anna Carina
- Released: June 15, 2010
- Recorded: 2009–2010
- Genres: Latin pop, rock
- Language: Spanish
- Label: 11 y 11 Discos

Anna Carina chronology
Espiral (2005)	AnnaCarinaPop (2010)	Anna Carina & Diego Dibós cantan en Navidad (2011)

Singles from AnnaCarinaPop
- 1. "Cielo Sin Luz" Released: November 24, 2009; 2. "Ya Fue Demasiado" Released: 2010; 3. "Dime Si Esto Es Amor" Released: 2011; 4. "Me Cansé" Released: 2012

AnnaCarinaPop is the third studio album by Peruvian singer Anna Carina released on June 15, 2010.

== Release and reception ==
The album was released on June 15, 2010, and was certified platinum in Perú for selling more than 10,000 copies.

== Promotion ==
Apart from releasing four singles from the album, Anna Carina also released the album at 20 percent off in the month of June along with the first 200 copies sold being autographed.

== Singles ==
"Cielo Sin Luz" was released in 2009 as the lead single for the album. The song had airplay success in Perú and other parts of South America. The song reached the top spot on MTV Latin America allowing Anna Carina to enter markets such as Argentina, Ecuador, Colombia, Venezuela, Chile, Puerto Rico, and United States. The song was nominated for Song of the Year and Video of the Year at the Orgullosamente Latino Awards in 2010. The song also won the award for Best Song of the Year at the Comunidad Andina Awards in 2010 given by RadioCan.

"Ya Fue Demasiado" was released as the album's second single in 2010. The song topped the MTV Latin American songs list a few weeks after its release.

"Dime Si Esto Es Amor" was released in 2011 as the third single of the album. The song had success in Perú being considered as the most important song on several radio stations. The music video was released on April 4, 2011 on MTV Latin America. The song was featured on the telenovela Mi corazón insiste en Lola Volcán which aired on Telemundo.

"Me Cansé" was released in 2012 as the fourth and final single from the album. The song had big airplay success in Perú and features a guitar solo from Peruvian Rock singer-songwriter Pedro Suárez-Vértiz who also appears in the video. His appearance on the video got a lot of attention since he had been away from the spotlight for a while after losing his voice due to Progressive bulbar palsy.

== Track listing ==
All credits adapted from Discogs.

No.	Title	Length
1.	"Cielo Sin Luz"	3:46
2.	"Desde Que Tú Llegaste"	3:27
3.	"Me Cansé" (featuring Pedro Suárez-Vértiz)	3:00
4.	"Ya Fue Demasiado"	3:33
5.	"Dime Si Esto Es Amor"	3:32
6.	"Hasta El Final"	3:48
7.	"Despertar"	3:40
8.	"No Soy Tu Víctima Más"	3:58
9.	"Intuición"	3:38
10.	"Quédate Conmigo"	3:31

== Certifications and sales ==
Region	Certification	Certified units/sales
Perú (UNIMPRO)	Platinum	10,000
