= Arena Hash (album) =

1988 album by Arena Hash

Studio album by Arena Hash
- Released: 1988
- Recorded: January – April 1988
- Studios: Estudios RAV, Lima
- Genres: Rock, New Wave
- Length: 37:17
- Language: Spanish
- Labels: CBS, Discos Independientes
- Producer: Manuel Garrido-Lecca

Arena Hash chronology
Arena Hash (1988)	Ah, Ah, Ah (1991)

Singles from Arena Hash
- 1. "Kangrejo (Sacudía)" Released: 1987; 2. "Cuando la cama me da vueltas" Released: 1988; 3. "Me resfrié en Brasil" Released: 1988; 4. "Stress" Released: 1988; 5. "No cambiaré" Released: 1988; 6. "Rompe orejas" Released: 1988

Arena Hash is the first studio album by Peruvian rock band Arena Hash, released in 1988 by CBS and Discos Independientes. Six songs where released as singles in order to promote the album. It is considered a classic of Peruvian pop/rock and is a highly valued album for its musical quality and its impact on the music scene of the time. The songs "Stress", "Kangrejo (Sacudía)" and "Me resfrié en Brasil" were listed among the 12 most essential songs in Pedro Suárez-Vértiz' career.

== Composition ==
"Kangrejo (Sacudía)" was released in 1987 as the first single of the album. The song had success in Perú where it became a hit even though it didn't reach number one.

"Cuando la cama me da vueltas" was released in 1988 as the album's second single. The song became a huge hit in Perú topping the airplay list on several radio stations as soon as it was released becoming the band's first number one hit. Pedro Suárez-Vértiz wrote the song originally on the piano in a much slower rhythm.

"Me resfrié en Brasil" was released as the album's third single in 1988. The song had success in Peruvian radio becoming one of the album's biggest hits.

"Stress" was released in 1988 as the album's fourth single. The song received moderate airplay in Perú.

"No cambiaré" was released in 1988 as the fifth single of the album and it achieved moderate success in Perú.

"Rompe orejas" was released as the sixth and final single from the album. It received some airplay but didn't achieve as much as the album's other singles.

== Track listing ==
All songs written by Pedro Suárez-Vértiz, Patricio Suárez-Vértiz and Arturo Pomar Jr. except track 5 (Suárez-Vértiz, Suárez-Vértiz, Pomar, Kornhuber)

No.	Title	Length
1.	"Kangrejo (Sacudía)"	4:38
2.	"No cambiaré"	2:50
3.	"Me resfrié en Brasil"	3:50
4.	"Escóndeme"	3:33
5.	"Frustrado emocional"	4:12
6.	"Cuando la cama me da vueltas"	3:04
7.	"Stress"	4:09
8.	"Mueve lo que puedas"	3:36
9.	"De ti me va quedando nada"	3:41
10.	"Rompe orejas"	3:43

== Personnel ==
Arena Hash

- Pedro Suárez-Vértiz - guitars, vocals, additional keyboards
- Christian Meier – keyboard, backing vocals
- Patricio Suárez-Vértiz – bass, backing vocals
- Arturo Pomar Jr. – drums, percussion, backing vocals

Technical

- Manuel Gerrido-Lecca – producer, mixer
- Luis Temple – mixer
- Jorge Avalos – mixer

Additional personnel

- Carlos Espinoza – alto sax on "Stress"
- Mickey "Coyote" Denegri – lead guitar on "Rompe orejas"
- Eduardo Chávez – lead guitar on "No Cambiaré", backing vocals on "Me Resfrié en Brasil"
- Lito Figueroa – additional keyboards on "Mueve Lo Que Puedas"
- Germán Gonzáles – percussion on "Me Resfrié en Brasil"
- Nelli Escudero – artwork
- Hernando Suárez-Vértiz – photography
- Luis Felipe Cueto – photography
- Germán Gonzáles – cover
