= Anahí de Cárdenas =

Peruvian actress, model, dancer and singer (born 1983)

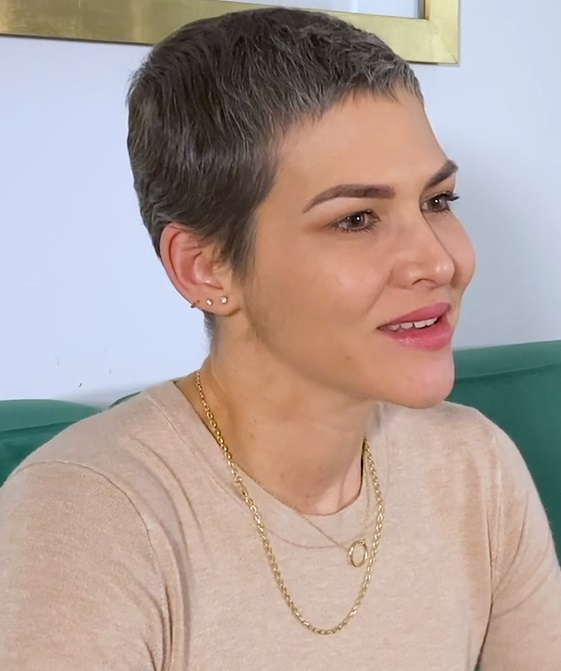
- de Cárdenas in 2020

Background information
- Born: Anahí Alejandra de Cárdenas Belmont; June 14, 1983 (age 43)
- Origin: Lima, Peru
- Genres: Pop; pop rock
- Occupations: Actress; model; dancer; singer
- Instrument: Vocals
- Label: Independent

Anahí Alejandra de Cárdenas Belmont (born June 14, 1983) is a Peruvian actress, model, dancer and singer.

== Filmography ==
List of film credits as an actress
Year	Title	Character	Notes
2008	Dioses	Andrea	
2008	Máncora	Ana María	
2011	The City of Gardens (Ciudad jardín)	Maritza	
2011	El guachimán	Sol	
2013	Asu Mare	Amiga de Emilia	
2017	Aj Zombies!	Claudia	
2025	To Die For	Lucy	

List of television credits as an actress
Year	Title	Character	Notes
2006	Esta sociedad	Úrsula "Uchi"	
2008	Esta sociedad 2	Úrsula "Uchi"	
2011	Lalola	Romina	Special participation
2011	La Perricholi	Rosa María de Altamirano	
2012	La Tayson, corazón rebelde	Victoria del Prado Sánchez-Concha	
2013	Solamente milagros	Vanessa / Danae	Episode "Una mala decisión"
2013	Mi amor, el wachimán 2	Fabiola Goytizolo	

List of television credits as herself
Year	Title	Character	Notes
2005	Habacilar	Model	
2008	Habacilar: Amigos y rivales	Contestant	6th Place
2009	El show de los sueños (Perú): Amigos del alma	Contestant	8th Place
2009	El show de los sueños: reyes del show	Contestant	6th Place
2010	Habacilar: Amigos y rivales	Contestant	2nd Place
2010	Habacilar: Amigos y rivales	Contestant	4th Place
2011	El Gran Show 2011 (season 2)	Contestant	8th Place

== Theater ==
List of theater credits as an actress
Year	Title	Role	Notes
2009	Cabaret	Texas (Ensamble)	Teatro Segura (May 13–June 21); Teatro Marsano (October 1–October 31)
2011	La tía de Carlos	Amy Spettigue	Teatro Peruano Japonés (April 13–June 19)
2012	Chicago	Katalin Hunyak "La húngara" (Ensamble)	Teatro Municipal de Lima (June 7–July 22); Teatro Marsano (July 27–September 9)
2013	El Chico de Oz	(Ensamble)	Teatro Municipal de Lima (May 8–June 30)

== Discography ==
- 2013: Who's That Girl?

== Singles ==
- 2013: "Gemini"

=== Guest artist ===
Year	Song	Album	Note
2009	"¡Despierta, es navidad!"	La Navidad de tus sueños	with "heroines" of El show de los sueños
2012	"Mr. Danger"	Grita Lobos!	Grita Lobos! with Anahí de Cárdenas and Chaq
