= Play (Pedro Suárez-Vértiz album) =

Studio album by Pedro Suárez-Vértiz
- Released: December 6, 2004
- Recorded: 2003–2004
- Studio: Estudio Amigos (Lima, Peru); Julius Estudios (Lima, Peru)
- Genre: Pop rock; latin rock; folk rock
- Length: 47:30
- Language: Spanish
- Label: Solver label

Pedro Suárez-Vértiz chronology
Anécdotas (2003)	Play (2004)	Talk Show (2006)

Singles from Play
- 1. "Bailar" Released: December 15, 2003; 2. "Cuando pienses en volver" Released: November 1, 2004; 3. "Lo olvidé" Released: April 4, 2005; 4. "Como las mariposas" Released: July 25, 2005; 5. "Buscando razón" Released: October 24, 2005

Play is the fourth studio album by the Peruvian singer-songwriter, Pedro Suárez-Vértiz, released on December 6, 2004, by Suárez-Vértiz's new record label, Solver Label. The album was edited in 2006 to release internationally.

== Production ==
After ending his contract with Sony Music, Pedro Suárez-Vértiz created his own record label called Solver Label in 2004. The album was recorded and mastered in Julius Estudios and Estudio Amigos in Lima, and then New York City. Suárez-Vértiz oversaw production. The album was edited in 2006 in Germany to release internationally. The reissue was released by ZYX Music.

== Critical reception ==
In 2004, the album was nominated in three categories for the Orgullosamente Latino Award, in which Pedro Suárez-Vértiz won the award. It was also nominated for the Premio Luces by El Comercio in 2006. The single "Cuando pienses en volver" became the most successful single in Suárez-Vértiz's career and was received well domestically and internationally. After the release of the album Pedro Suárez-Vértiz began to perform internationally in Europe, Japan, and the United States.

== Track listing ==
Are songs were composed by Pedro Suárez-Vértiz.

No.	Title	Length
1.	"Cuando pienses en volver"	4:17
2.	"Buscando razón"	3:57
3.	"La española"	4:03
4.	"Qué oscuridad"	4:28
5.	"Lo olvidé"	3:58
6.	"Como las mariposas"	3:49
7.	"Bailar"	4:19
8.	"Su lengua baila"	3:45
9.	"Mi querida maestra"	4:29
10.	"Anticuerpos de la noche"	3:27
11.	"Dos mañanas"	3:37
12.	"Los niños se enamoran"	3:24
