= Udora (band) =

- Origin: Belo Horizonte, Minas Gerais, Brazil
- Genres: Alternative rock; post-grunge
- Years active: 1997–2012
- Labels: Som Livre; J
- Members: Gustavo Drummond (guitars/vocals); Daniel Debarry (bass); Marcelo Mercedo (guitars); PH (drums)
- Past members: Ian Dolabella (bass); Jean Dolabella (drums); Leonardo Marques (guitars); Thiago Correa (bass)

Udora is a Brazilian rock band originally from Belo Horizonte, Minas Gerais, Brazil. Its members lived for five years in Los Angeles, California, United States, and moved back to Brazil in 2006.

The band was formed in 1997 by singer/guitarist Gustavo Drummond, drummer Jean Dolabella and bassist Ian Dolabella (Jean's brother) under the name Diesel and was one of the biggest names in the Belo Horizonte underground music scene. Shortly after guitarist Leo Marques joined and around 1999 Ian left the band for being contrary to the exposure they were having, being replaced by bassist Thiago Correa, nicknamed TC. In 2001, the band gained nationwide exposure after winning, through a battle of the bands-style contest, a spot on the main stage of the Rock in Rio 3 festival. They opened the last day of the festival, performing alongside bands like Deftones, Silverchair and the Red Hot Chili Peppers.

In August 2001, the band decided to move to Los Angeles in an attempt to break into the US market. The name Diesel was dropped to avoid conflict with Diesel jeans. After playing several shows in small local clubs, they were signed to J Records and went into the studio with producer Matt Wallace to record their first album as Udora, Liberty Square. After a lengthy tour of the US supporting former Alice in Chains guitarist Jerry Cantrell, J Records merged with RCA. The change in management was not well received by the band and they chose to sever their ties with the label.

In 2006, singer/guitarist Gustavo Drummond announced that drummer Jean Dolabella was leaving the band, citing "irreconcilable differences, both personal and musical" as the motive of his departure. Due to Jean's departure, their tour in Brazil scheduled for May 2006 was canceled. A few months later, Dolabella joined Sepultura, replacing Igor Cavalera on drums. Drummond decided to return to Brazil and record a new Udora album with songs in Portuguese named Goodbye, Alô. He was joined by bassist Daniel Debarry, who replaced Thiago Correa, and drummer Paulo Henrique Braga, nicknamed PH.

The band promoted the album throughout Brazil and got moderate radio airplay while signing a deal with major Brazilian record label Som Livre to re-release their first fully Portuguese work nationally. They enjoyed moderate success with songs being played on national TV teen shows such as Malhação, on Globo TV. Around 2009, Leo Marques left the band to pursue other musical goals and guitarist, songwriter and long time mate of Drummond's Marcelo Mercedo joined the band. Marcelo also co-wrote a few songs with Drummond on their Brazilian début Goodbye, Alô.

With yet another lineup, the band regrouped to record their fourth album, Belle Époque, heavily influenced by pop music and a dramatic departure from their first work as Diesel. The album took about two and a half years to be produced and recorded and was finally released on August 15, 2011. Although with a new work, the band decided not to launch a tour to support the album and are currently playing small but sparse gigs in their hometown Belo Horizonte.

Gustavo Drummond is currently setting up to record his first solo effort, having already released a few demos on his Myspace. According to him, all songs are already written and ready to be recorded.

== Discography ==
- 2000 – Diesel (as Diesel)
- 2005 – Liberty Square
- 2007 – Goodbye, Alô
- 2011 – Belle Époque
