= (No existen) Técnicas Para Olvidar =

Studio album by Pedro Suárez-Vértiz
- Released: October 19, 1993
- Studios: Estudios Ávalos (Lima); Loves Studio (New York City)
- Genre: Pop rock
- Length: 36:40
- Label: Sony Music
- Producer: Pedro Suárez-Vértiz

Pedro Suárez-Vértiz chronology
(No existen) Técnicas Para Olvidar (1993)	Póntelo en la Lengua (1996)

Singles from (No existen) Técnicas Para Olvidar
- 1. "Me elevé" Released: August 2, 1993; 2. "Cuéntame" Released: December 13, 1993; 3. "Globo de gas" Released: January 31, 1994; 4. "No pensé que era amor" Released: April 18, 1994; 5. "Días de infancia" Released: May 30, 1994

(No existen) Técnicas Para Olvidar (English: (There are none) Techniques For Forgetting) is the first studio album by the Peruvian singer-songwriter, Pedro Suárez-Vértiz. It was released on October 19, 1993, originally by Discos Independientes, later released by Sony Music. This was the first album created by Suárez-Vértiz during his solo career, after the break up of Arena Hash and his first with Sony Music.

After the break up of Arena Hash returning from the United States to Peru, Pedro Suárez-Vértiz pursued a solo career. Many of the songs of the album were planned for the third album of Arena Hash, written by Suárez-Vértiz as a side project from the band. The album was released by Discos Independientes del Perú and Solver Records until Suárez-Vértiz signed with Sony Music in 1994, who then released the album on compact disc.

== Background ==
Pedro Suárez-Vértiz waited for the band Arena Hash to reunite so he could release new material. His dream, according to some accounts, was for the band to achieve international recognition and remain relevant for years, but this didn't happen due to differences among the members. The album was already mostly written, and was planned to be the third studio album of the band. According to Pedro himself in an interview with El Comercio, his wife was pregnant, and he had no other option but to go solo. Later, Suárez-Vértiz stated in another interview with El Comercio that the band "isn't broken up, it's just taking a temporary break." Although Arena Hash didn't release any new material, several members of the band participated in some of his solo tracks.

According to Arturo Pomar Jr., on a return trip from Miami, him, along with Patricio Suárez-Vértiz, and Christian Meier, hoped to internationalize the music of the band. However, Pedro Suárez-Vértiz did not approve and distanced himself from the band, leading to the break up.

== Production ==
The album was originally released on cassette by Discos Independientes del Perú and Solver Records with three singles. After the cassette's success, Sony Music Latin released it on compact disc. From this album until the present (as a solo artist), Pedro's manager has been Robelo Calderón. The production and musical arrangements were done by Pedro Suárez-Vértiz himself, and were praised by the Peruvian composer Augusto Polo Campos. The album was recorded in Lima and New York City.

== Critical reception ==
Professional ratings
Review scores
Source	Rating
Discogs	4.1/5 stars
Rate Your Music	3.5/5 stars

The album was certifited triple platinum in Peru after selling over 30,000 copies. The track "Globo de gas", according to DJ Chapu (then a DJ at Doble Nueve ), was predicted to be the number one single on radio stations across the country in 1994. Other hit songs included "Me elevé", "Cuéntame," and the ballad "No pensé que era amor."

== Track listing ==
Are songs were composed by Pedro Suárez-Vértiz.

No.	Title	Length
1.	"Tambaleando"	3:14
2.	"Cuéntame"	3:53
3.	"Globo de gas"	3:08
4.	"No llores más"	3:50
5.	"Me voy de aquí"	4:07
6.	"Me elevé"	3:37
7.	"Técnicas para olvidar"	2:49
8.	"No pensé que era amor"	3:50
9.	"Si escuchas a un angel"	2:59
10.	"Días de infancia"	3:35
11.	"1:38"	1:38

== Certifications and sales ==
Region	Certification	Certified units/sales
Perú (UNIMPRO)	3× Platinum	30,000

== Personnel ==
- Pedro Suárez-Vértiz – lead vocals, acoustic guitar, electric guitar, backing vocals, piano, harmonica, drums, percussion, bass
- Abel Salcedo – acoustic guitar, electric guitar
- Patricio Suárez-Vértiz – bass, backing vocals
- Christian Meier – backing vocals, percussion
- Armando Patroni – drums
- Lucia Vivanco – violin
- Gonzálo Polar – saxophone
- Nina Mutal – backing vocals
- Coco Silva – backing vocals

Produced by Pedro Suárez-Vértiz.
