= Amazonas (album) =

Studio album by Pedro Suárez-Vértiz
- Released: June 11, 2009
- Recorded: 2008–2009
- Studio: British Grove (London; MadDog Studios (Los Angeles); WoomRoom (Los Angeles)
- Genre: Pop rock
- Length: 51:40
- Label: Warner Spain
- Producer: Thom Russo

Pedro Suárez-Vértiz chronology
Pedro Suárez-Vértiz (2007)	Amazonas (2009)	Amazonas Uncut (2010)

Singles from Amazonas
- 1. "Amazonas" Released: 2009; 2. "Nadia" Released: 2009

Amazonas is the sixth and final studio album by the Peruvian singer-songwriter, Pedro Suárez-Vértiz, released on 11 June, 2009. The album was the first produced after Suárez-Vertiz new label, Warner Spain. The album was released also as an educational campaign by Suárez-Vertiz regarding climate change.

== Production ==
The album was recorded at British Grove in London, and MadDog and WoomRoom Studios in Los Angeles. After signing with Warner Spain, Suárez-Vértiz largely promoted the album in Europe and North America. It was edited in Miami and Puerto Rico and produced by Thom Russo.

== Critical reception ==
The message and content of the album was received well by the Peruvian as well as Spanish public in Spain and the United States. The single "Amazonas" became latin song representative for Expo 2008 and was part of the Recicla Mueve el Mundo in Madrid for World Environment Day. The second single, "Nadia" entered the Billboard's top 50 song in November 2009.

On 21 December, 2009, Suárez-Vértiz became the special guest of the Water Cup, a football game between Peru and Ecuador to spread environmental awareness, as a result of the album.

== Track listing ==
All songs were composed by Pedro Suárez-Vértiz.

No.	Title	Length
1.	"Amazonas"	3:55
2.	"Túnel del tiempo"	4:15
3.	"Hay un modo"	3:34
4.	"Mariló" (with Huecco)	5:16
5.	"Ella y él"	3:57
6.	"Ponerme a volar"	4:42
7.	"Nadia" (with Juan Diego Flórez)	4:42
8.	"El bailador"	4:33
9.	"Estoy cansado de llorar"	3:34
10.	"Se te pararían los pelos"	3:57
11.	"Tema del adiós"	4:07
12.	"Nadia (Single)" (with Juan Diego Flórez)	4:02

== Personnel ==
- Pedro Suárez-Vértiz – lead vocals, acoustic guitar, electric guitar, backing vocals, piano, harmonica
- Huecco – lead vocals, backing vocals
- Juan Diego Flórez – lead vocals, backing vocals
- Thom Russo – keyboard, piano
- Randy Cooke – drums
- Juan Perez – bass
- Manuel Comejo – acoustic guitar
- Miguel Angel Yance – electric guitar
- Stewart Cole – wind instruments
- Eugene Toale – wind instruments
- Bernard Fowler – backing vocals
- Maria José Suárez-Vértiz – backing vocals
- Salvador Suárez-Vértiz – backing vocals
- Alexia Arredonado – backing vocals

Produced by Thom Russo
