= Arena Hash =

Peruvian rock band

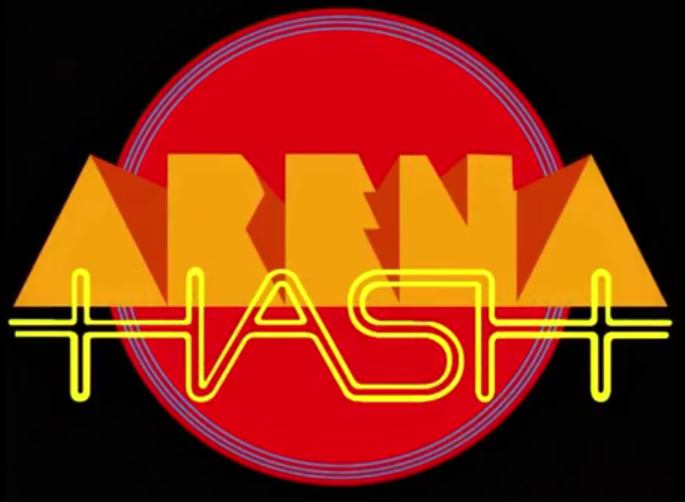
- Logo of the band

Background information
- Origin: San Isidro, Lima, Peru
- Genres: Rock, Latin rock, Indie rock
- Years active: 1984–1993
- Labels: Discos Independientes; CBS; SonoSur
- Past members: Pedro Suárez-Vértiz; Christian Meier; Patricio Suárez-Vértiz; Arturo Pomar Jr. Álex Kornhuber (1984–1987)

Arena Hash was a Peruvian rock band formed in Lima in 1984. The band originated from the early "Paranoia", a band formed at the Colegio Maria Reina by Pedro Suárez-Vértiz. Arena Hash became famous in 1988 with their local hit "Cuando la cama me da vueltas". With a mix of rock, latin and indie rock, the band became the most popular of Peru during the golden age of Peruvian rock in the 1980s and 90s. The band was known for revolutionizing Peruvian rock and has become a symbol of pop rock, new wave and ska rock in Peru and Latin America.

== History ==
=== Beginnings (1985–1987) ===
The beginnings of the band took place in the Colegio María Reina Marianistas in the San Isidro District of Lima in 1983. Originally, the band was called Paranoia, and consisted of many members, playing covers of popular existing bands. Pedro Suárez-Vértiz, who was lead singer, thought the band was too big and wanted to compose his own music. He would ask the band if anyone would want to join him. Those who accepted were Álex Kornhuber, Arturo Pomar Jr. and his brother, Patricio Suárez-Vértiz.

The origin of the band's name arises when wanted a compound name for the group and Álex Kornhuber asked that one of the words have to do with the beach and sea. They thought of Arena Blanca, Arena Azul, among other names; but for Suárez-Vértiz it did not fit. Then, they thought of the word Hash. Pedro liked it, but was uncomfortable with the fact that in English, it meant 'minced meat'. Then Pedro was in the classroom with Alex and they passed around papers with the different combinations. When he received the one from Arena Hash, everyone agreed on the name. When Patricio sent the first cassette tape to the radio station, Doble Nueve, he did not like the word Hash, and he crossed out so that the name would remain only Arena. But the radio loved what was on the cross-out and announced them as Arena Hash.

In their beginnings, the band started doing garage rock and recorded a hard rock song titled "Difamación". This song was broadcast solely and exclusively by Doble Nueve 99.1 FM, and even appeared in its weekly ranking in the last quarter of 1985, being its first single at that time, despite not having the support of a record label at that time. Curiously, this song is not included in any album, but thanks to it they had started their path to popularity.

In 1987, there was a change in the group with the departure of Álex Kornhuber for personal reasons and the entry of Christian Meier on keyboard, already in January 1988. Christian Meier explained that the band came to the door of his home, hearing that he played keyboard, and asked him to join The band to which he accepted. The band would be made up of Pedro Suárez-Vértiz on vocals and guitar, his brother Patricio Suárez-Vértiz on bass, Arturo Pomar Jr. on drums and Christian Meier on keyboard.

=== Arena Hash (1988–1990) ===
In 1987, Arena Hash signed with record label, Discos Independientes del Peru, which would frequently produce songs by the band. Later, the band would sign with giants CBS Records after many radio stations played their songs. In 1988, they released, between January and April, their first debut album entitled Arena Hash, produced by CBS and Discos Independientes. The first single from the album to be broadcast on radio stations was "Kangrejo (Sacudía)", followed by the single entitled "Cuando la cama me da vueltas", which became number one on the different radio stations across Lima and Peru. It was here where Arena Hash would become one of the most popular in the history of Peru.

From this first album, the songs "Me resfrié en Brasil", "No cambiaré", both in new wave style, were also played, as well as "Stress" and the hard rock or heavy metal "Rompe orejas", a reminiscence of his beginnings. In 1989, Arena Hash performed a series of concerts in cities such as Iquitos, Arequipa and Trujillo. They filled stadiums, arenas and was one of the few groups that became idols of crowds. In 1990, they began to play "Materialismo sexual", a song that was included in his second album; but that did not achieve the success of previous hits.

=== Ah Ah Ah (1991–1993) ===
After ending their contract with CBS, Arena Hash signed with SonoSur. In 1991, the second album of entitled Ah, Ah, Ah was released. The first video clip of this production was "El rey del ah, ah, ah" a song that became a success. In addition, "Y es que sucede así" was also played, which quickly became number one on all Peruvian radios and of the band. Other singles from the album were also played, such as "A ese infierno no voy a volver" and the melancholic new wave ballad "¿Cómo te va, mi amor?". Another little-known song on the album was the new wave-reggae "Quiero vivir tal vez sin amor". Three music videos of "Y es que sucede así", "El rey del ah, ah, ah", and "A ese infierno no voy a volver" were produced as, along with numerous independent videos to promote the band, such as "El túnel del bus". The band would continue to tour the country and traveled to Miami.

On May 15, 1993, Arena Hash gave their last concert at the coliseum of the Colegio San Agustín together with Frágil, being the opening act for the band Foreigner. After that, the group separates. Pedro Suárez-Vértiz hoped to continue with the band in order to release their third studio album and expand internationally. According to Arturo Pomar however, the rest of the band wanted to internationalize their music but Pedro Suárez-Vértiz did not want anyone to play his songs and thus distanced himself from the band.

=== After Arena Hash ===
In 1995 Del archivo de ... Arena Hash was released, which is the reissue of their first album, which includes a song by Pedro Suárez-Vértiz and also three simulated live versions, one of them would be "Me Resfrié en Brasil" in a simulated live version. All members of Arena Hash pursued solo careers. Pedro Suárez-Vértiz would become the greatest Peruvian rocker of all time. His first studio album, (No existen) Técnicas Para Olvidar, was the planned third album of Arena Hash, consisting of many of the songs that were to on it. In the album cover, Suárez-Vértiz appears alone on a bench showing his solo career. while Christian Meier would also become very successful, Patricio and Arturo Pomar also released their own music. Many of the members participated in each others tracks. Pedro Suárez-Vértiz died on 28 December, 2023, at the age of 54. Arturo Pomar Jr. created the Y Es Que Sucede Así - El Show in 2025 to preserve the music created by the band.

== Members ==
These are all the members of Arena Hash.

- Pedro Suárez-Vértiz (vocals, guitar) (died in 2023)
- Patricio Suárez-Vértiz (bass)
- Christian Meier (keyboards)
- Arturo Pomar Jr. (drums)
- Álex Kornhuber (guitar) (1984–1987)

== Discography ==
=== Studio albums ===
- Arena Hash (1988)
- Ah, Ah, Ah (1990)

=== Compilation albums ===
- Del Archivo de... Arena Hash (1995)

=== Singles ===
- "Difamación" (1985)
- "Kangrejo (Sacudía)" (1988)
- "Cuando la cama me da vueltas" (1988)
- "Me resfrié en Brasil" (1988)
- "Stress" (1988)
- "El rey del ah, ah, ah" (1991)
- "Y es que sucede así" (1991)
- "¿Cómo te va, mi amor?" (1991)
- "A ese infierno no voy a volver" (1991)

=== Music videos ===
- "El rey del ah, ah, ah" (1991)
- "Y es que sucede así" (1991)
- "A ese infierno no voy a volver" (1991) (2 versions)
