= Degeneración Actual =

Studio album by Pedro Suárez-Vértiz
- Released: November 9, 1999
- Recorded: 1998–1999
- Studio: Living Stereo (Miami); Studio Center (Miami); South Beach Studios (Miami)
- Genre: Spanish rock; pop rock
- Length: 56:35
- Label: Sony Music
- Producer: Léster Méndez

Pedro Suárez-Vértiz chronology
Póntelo en la lengua (1996)	Degeneración Actual (1999)	Lo mejor de Pedro Suárez-Vértiz vol. 1 (2001)

Singles from Degeneración Actual
- 1. "Degeneración actual" Released: September 13, 1999; 2. "Tren sexual" Released: November 10, 1999; 3. "Un vino, una cerveza" Released: April 10, 2000; 4. "Alguien que bese como tu" Released: June 5, 2000; 5. "Placeres y dolor" Released: September 4, 2000; 6. "El secreto en tu mente" Released: November 13, 2000; 7. "Cuando el sol va a salir" Released: 5 February 2001

Degeneración Actual (English: Current Degeneration) is the third studio album by the Peruvian singer-songwriter, Pedro Suárez-Vértiz. Work on Degeneración Actual began in 1998 with Manuel Garrido-Lecca, a frequent collaborator of Suárez-Vértiz. The album was produced by Léster Méndez in Miami, officially releasing on 9 November, 1999, by Sony Music. The album sold over 40,000 copies, becoming certified triple platinum in Peru.

== Production ==
Pedro Suárez-Vertiz, with César Sogbe as recording engineer and Gustavo Celis as mixing engineer, began recording the album in late 1998 in the studios Living Stero, Studio Center and South Beach Studios, all located in Miami. The album was mastered at HitFactory Studio in New York City and released on 9 November 1999, produced by Léster Méndez.

== Composition ==
The album contains 12 songs, all composed by Suárez-Vértiz himself. Tracks like "Degeneración actual", the first promotional single and title track, address sexual assault and the "degeneration" of society. "El tren sexual" , the album's second single, has a fast rhythm and a composition reminiscent of ska and classic rock. Certain songs venture into different musical genres. "Cuando el sol va a salir" has reggae influences, and "Rapta la mona" features a composition similar to urban music and hip hop . Ballads also play an important role in this production, in songs like "Fantasma A Presión" and "El secreto en tu mente". The album's final track, "China wife," is purely instrumental and has no lyrics.

== Critical reception ==
The album received positive critical and commercial reception. Following its release, Suarez-Vértiz was named artist of the year by the publication El Comercio, a title he would receive for four consecutive years. International critics, such as Drago Bonacich of AllMusic, acclaimed the album's "experimental perspective," noting Suárez-Vértiz as one of the most important artists on the Latin music scene.

Many songs from the album were featured on the Latin American television channel, HTV.

In 2024, a mural of the album, dedicated to Pedro Suárez-Vértiz, was painted in the Bajada Balta of the Miraflores District in Lima.

== Track listing ==
Are songs were composed by Pedro Suárez-Vértiz.

No.	Title	Length
1.	"Degeneración actual"	5:14
2.	"Déjame vivir"	3:53
3.	"Tren sexual"	4:08
4.	"El secreto en tu mente"	5:17
5.	"Placeres y dolor"	4:16
6.	"Nataly"	4:10
7.	"Cuando el sol va a salir"	4:34
8.	"Un vino, una cerveza"	4:32
9.	"Fantasma a presión"	4:45
10.	"Alguien que bese como tú"	6:06
11.	"Rapta la mona"	4:48
12.	"China wife"	4:03

== Certifications and sales ==
Region	Certification	Certified units/sales
Perú (UNIMPRO)	3× Platinum	40,000

== Personnel ==
- Pedro Suárez-Vértiz – lead vocals, acoustic guitar, electric guitar, backing vocals, keyboard, harmonica
- Abel Salcedo – acoustic guitar, electric guitar, backing vocals
- Léster Méndez – piano, keyboard
- Adam Zimmon – acoustic guitar
- Julio Hernández – bass
- Brandon Buckley – drums
- Ed Calle – wind instruments
- Pedro Alfonso – violin
- Randy Singer – harmonica
- Pepe Criado – backing vocals
- Carlos Beraún – backing vocals
- Tommy Anthony – backing vocals

Produced by Léster Méndez
