= Talk Show (Pedro Suárez-Vértiz album) =

Studio album by Pedro Suárez-Vértiz
- Released: January 1, 2006
- Studio: Estudios MCA (Lima)
- Genre: Pop rock
- Length: 36:23
- Label: Solver Label

Pedro Suárez-Vértiz chronology
Play (2004)	Talk Show (2006)	Pedro Suárez-Vértiz (2007)

Singles from Talk Show
- 1. "El triunfo tan soñado" Released: January 9, 2006; 2. "Talk Show" Released: April 10, 2006; 3. "No llores más, morena" Released: November 4, 2006

Talk Show is the fifth studio album by the Peruvian singer-songwriter Pedro Suárez-Vértiz. Released on 1 January, 2006, by Solver Label, it was also the soundtrack for the Peruvian film, Talk Show.

== Composition ==
Most of the songs are instrumental, the compositions being from the Peruvian film, Talk Show. The title track, "Talk Show", was first performed in 2000. The song is entirely spoken with an instrumental backing track and is based on a true story from the Suárez-Vértiz's youth.

== Critical reception ==
The single, "El triunfo tan soñado" became the official song for the 2005 FIFA U-17 World Championship held in Peru. The song "Talk Show" became among the most popular of the album, Suárez-Vértiz stated that he did not expect the song to be a hit, as his wife suggested he write it as therapy after learning of a tragedy related to his youth.

== Track listing ==
All the songs were composed by Pedro Suárez-Vértiz.

No.	Title	Length
1.	"Endal"	3:57
2.	"Viaje al Sol"	2:02
3.	"Diantinos"	2:21
4.	"Talk Show"	5:54
5.	"Eloísa"	2:10
6.	"No llores más, morena"	3:31
7.	"Rara soledad"	2:16
8.	"Recuéstame"	3:55
9.	"Como las mariposas (rémix)"	3:47
10.	"El triunfo tan soñado"	4:22
11.	"Revolundar"	2:08
12.	"Bailar (rémix)"	3:31
13.	"Rara soledad (incidental)"	2:13
14.	"Hoy me llenaré de valor (Tema de Tereso)"	3:14
