= Thom Russo =

American record producer

- Born: Thomas Russo; Cleveland, Ohio, U.S.
- Origin: Los Angeles, California, U.S.
- Genres: Pop rock, alternative, Latin, soundtrack
- Occupations: Record producer, composer, mixing engineer
- Years active: 2000–present
- Labels: SONORO Productions, Inc.
- Spouse: Alanna Ubach (m. 2014)
- Website: www.thomrusso.net

Thomas Russo is an American record producer, composer, mixing engineer, and songwriter. His work spans Anglo-American pop rock and alternative rock, as well as Latin music. He has received 16 Grammy Awards.

== Life and education ==
Thom Russo was born in Cleveland, Ohio. He studied composition, music theory, and electronic music at Northwestern University in Evanston, Illinois. He lives and works in Los Angeles.

== Career ==
Russo began his professional career as a musician but developed an interest in music production, composition, engineering, and recording while studying at the Northwestern University Conservatory of Music. He first worked at River North Studios in Chicago, where he was mentored by composers and arrangers in the advertising industry. He later moved to Larrabee Sound Studios in Los Angeles and subsequently worked independently under Nettwerk Producer Management.

One of his earliest projects at Larrabee was producing vocals for Michael Jackson's album Dangerous. He also contributed to Bobby Brown's Bobby, Cher's Greatest Hits: 1965–1992, Diana Ross's Take Me Higher, and Paula Abdul's Head Over Heels.

This early work provided the foundation for Russo's later career. Over the years, he has collaborated with a wide range of artists, including:

- Alejandro Sanz (El Tren de los Momentos)
- Aterciopelados (Oye)
- Audioslave (Audioslave, Like a Stone, Doesn't Remind Me, Out of Exile)
- Babyface (For the Cool in You, The Day, A Collection of His Greatest Hits)
- Bird York (The Velvet Hour, Wicked Little High)
- Don Tetto
- Enrique Iglesias (Enrique Iglesias)
- Eric Clapton (Change the World)
- Faith Evans (A Faithful Christmas, Keep the Faith)
- Jay-Z (99 Problems)
- Jermaine Dupri (12 Soulful Nights of Christmas)
- Jesse & Joy (Electricidad)
- Johnny Cash (American IV: The Man Comes Around)
- Juanes (Fíjate Bien, Un Día Normal, Mi Sangre, La Vida... Es Un Ratico)
- Libido (Pop*Porn)
- Love Star (Espectro)
- Macy Gray (The Id, The Trouble with Being Myself, The Very Best of Macy Gray)
- Maná (Amar es Combatir, Drama y Luz)
- Michael Jackson (King of Pop)
- Pedro Suárez-Vértiz (Amazonas)
- Toto (Kingdom of Desire)
- Los Claxons (Un Día de Sol)

Full listings are available in music databases.

Since 2000, Russo has increasingly worked in Latin rock and pop music, collaborating with Juanes, Maná, and other artists from Latin America, Central America, and Spain.

Russo's mixing techniques include the use of audio filtering with different microphones and equalizers, dynamic range compression, sound fading, and other unconventional approaches. He adapts these methods to highlight distinctive features in the music he records, citing record producer Rick Rubin as one of his main professional influences.

In 2016, Russo was a featured guest at Kingvention, an annual convention in London celebrating the life and career of Michael Jackson.

== Awards ==
Russo has received 12 platinum record awards, along with two Grammy Awards and 12 Latin Grammy Awards.

Year	Category	Work	Role	Result
2001 Latin Grammy Awards	Best Rock Solo Vocal Album	Fíjate Bien	Engineer/mixer	Won
2001 Latin Grammy Awards	Album of the Year	Fíjate Bien	Engineer/mixer	Nominated
2001 Latin Grammy Awards	Record of the Year	El Alma al Aire	Engineer/mixer	Nominated
2003 Latin Grammy Awards	Album of the Year	Un Día Normal	Engineer/mixer	Won
2003 Latin Grammy Awards	Best Rock Solo Vocal Album	Un Día Normal	Engineer/mixer	Won
2003 Latin Grammy Awards	Record of the Year	Es Por Ti	Engineer/mixer	Won
2005 Latin Grammy Awards	Best Rock Solo Vocal Album	Mi Sangre	Engineer/mixer	Won
2007 Grammy Awards	Best Latin Rock/Alternative Album	Amar es Combatir	Engineer/mixer	Won
2007 Grammy Awards	Best Latin Pop Album	El Tren de los Momentos	Engineer	Won
2007 Latin Grammy Awards	Best Alternative Music Album	Oye	Engineer	Won
2008 Latin Grammy Awards	Album of the Year	La Vida... Es Un Ratico	Engineer/mixer	Won
2008 Latin Grammy Awards	Record of the Year	Me Enamora	Engineer/mixer	Won
2008 Latin Grammy Awards	Best Male Pop Vocal Album	La Vida... Es Un Ratico	Engineer	Won
2010 Latin Grammy Awards	Best Engineered Album	Distinto	Engineer	Won
2011 Latin Grammy Awards	Best Engineered Album	Drama y Luz	Engineer	Won
2011 Latin Grammy Awards	Best Rock Album	Drama y Luz	Engineer	Won
