= Jandy Feliz =

Dominican Republic musician

José del Carmen Feliz Matos (born January 11, 1977), better known as Jandy Feliz, is a singer-songwriter better known for being the vocalist of the band "Chichi Peralta". He was born in Jaquimeyes, Dominican Republic.

== Biography ==
Feliz began his career as a member of the group Chichi Peralta y Son Familia. He was the lead vocalist on the group's biggest hit to date, "Procura". In 2001, he went solo and released his first album, Jandy Feliz. In 2002, he released his second album, Amor de Locos, which contained the hit single "Los Amores". In 2005, he released his greatest hits album, despite having recorded a total only two previous albums. On 30 August 2010 Jandy released his third studio album Jandy which included the singles "Solo el Amor" and "Por Si Acaso".

In early 2015, feeling music was not allowing him enough artistic freedom, he travelled to Australia and became a founding member of JDNA, an athletic club for disadvantaged and disillusioned young men.

== Studio albums ==
- Hasta Que lo Pierde (2000)
- Jandy Feliz (2001)
- Amor de Locos (2002)
- Con Su Permiso (2009)
- Jandy (2010)

== Compilation albums ==
- La Pasión: Lo Mejor de Jandy Feliz (2005)

== See also ==
- Chino Rodriguez, manager of Jandy Feliz
