= Pedro Suárez-Vértiz =

Peruvian singer-songwriter and guitarist (1969–2023)

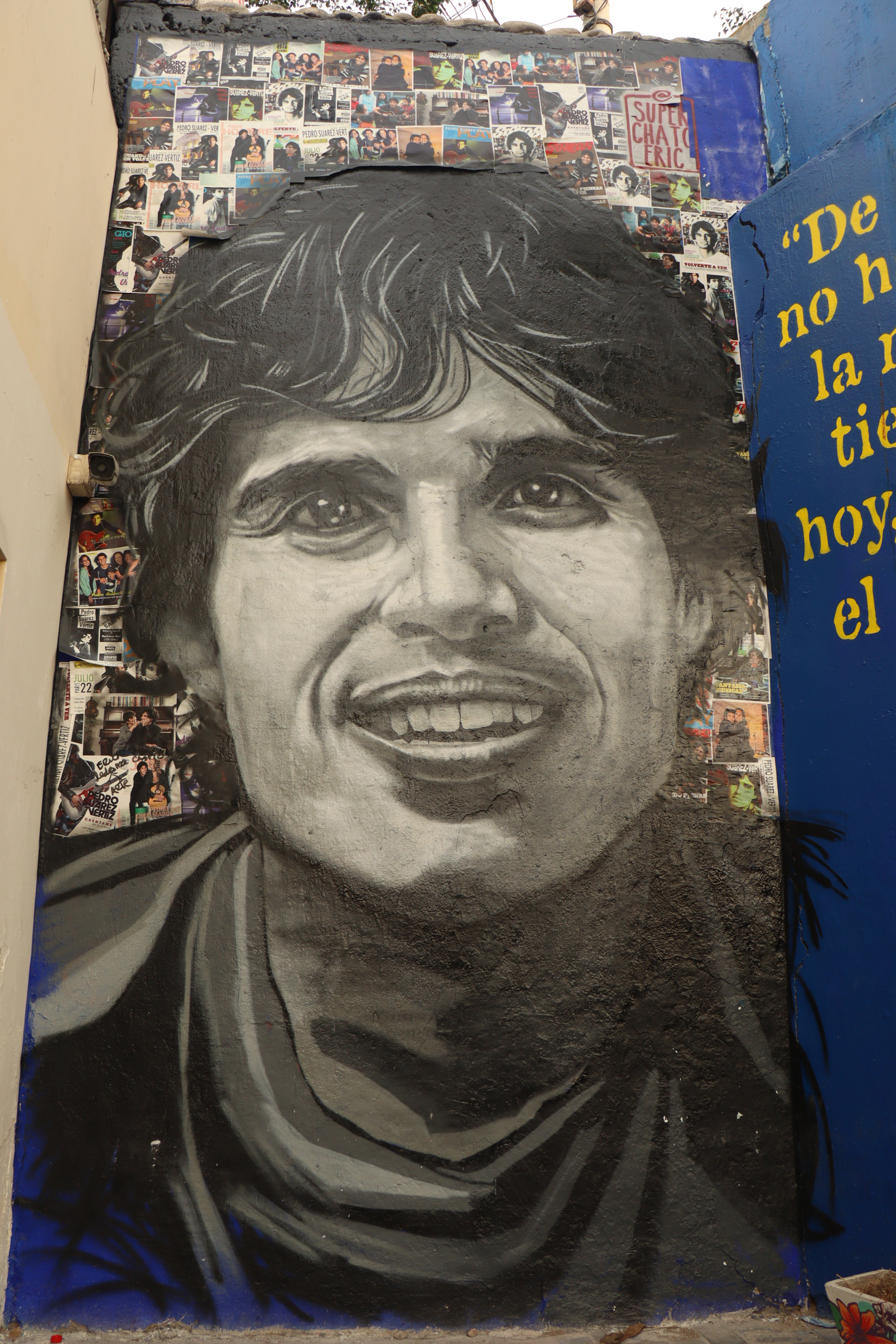
- Mural of Pedro Suárez-Vértiz in Barranco, Lima

Background information
- Born: Pedro Martín José María Suárez-Vértiz Alva; 13 February 1969; Callao, Peru
- Died: 28 December 2023 (aged 54) Lima, Peru
- Genres: Rock; Electronic rock; Pop rock; Ska rock; Alternative rock; Folk rock; Latin rock; Experimental rock
- Occupations: Musician; Singer-songwriter; Record producer; Writer
- Instruments: Vocals; Guitar; Bass; Piano; Harmonica; Flute; Drums
- Years active: 1983–2011
- Labels: Sony Music; Solver Label; Warner Spain
- Formerly of: Arena Hash

Pedro Martín José María Suárez-Vértiz Alva (13 February 1969 – 28 December 2023) was a Peruvian musician and singer-songwriter. He founded the popular rock band Arena Hash with his brother Patricio, Arturo Pomar Jr., and Christian Meier in 1987. A few years later, the band disbanded, and Suárez-Vértiz began his solo career. Pedro Suárez-Vertiz is widely considered a legend of Peruvian rock, and is recognized by Billboard as an "icon of Peruvian rock".

His musical passion grew early in his life, first introduced by his father with a piano which became his first musical instrument. He grew a love of singing after being influenced by the movie, A Hard Day's Night, which featured the famous band, The Beatles. He began playing guitar in primary school, forming his first band known as Paranoia, which later developed to become the popular rock band, Arena Hash.

Suárez-Vértiz was well known for his multitudinous concerts, his vocal rhythm, his extensive guitar collection, his abstinence from alcohol and tobacco, philanthropy, and personality. In 2020, BIllboard magazine named his hit song Los globos del cielo as number 14 on the list of The 25 Timeless Masterpieces of Rock in Spanish. His albums Póntelo en la lengua and Ponerme a Volar are among the best-selling albums in Perú.

Suárez-Vértiz was the winner of Orgullosamente Latino 2004 (Proudly Latin 2004) and was also awarded Best Latin Soloist of the Year in Mexico that same year. He worked as a columnist in the newspaper El Comercio and published his book: Yo, Pedro. After being diagnosed with progressive bulbar palsy in 2011, he moved away from singing, as it had caused speech difficulties. He died on 28 December, 2023, at the age of 54 due to cardiac arrest.

== Early life ==
Pedro Suárez-Vértiz was born in the Hospital Naval del Callao in Callao, Peru, on 13 February, 1969. His mother and maternal grandfather belonged to the Marina de Guerra del Perú for many years which is why he was born in the Naval Hospital. His grandfather was painter Germán Suárez Vértiz (1897–1975). His younger brother, Patricio Suárez-Vértiz, was born on 15 September, 1970. His sister, María Fe Suárez Vértiz, was born on 19 December. They spent their childhood and adolescence in San Isidro, in front of the Olivar park, his favorite park.

Suárez-Vértiz was passionate about music since he was a small child. At age one, Pedro settled the ornaments of his house down like a xylophone and smacked them with a wand to get melodies out of them. Seeing his interest in music, his father bought him an old Celesta Dulcitone, Pedro's first musical instrument. Just a few years later, his parents would buy him a piano. Suárez-Vértiz knew he wanted to be a singer when he saw the movie A Hard Day's Night for the first time, in which the famous English band The Beatles appeared.

Suárez-Vértiz learned to play the piano and the guitar before he began school. At the age of nine at the Colegio María Reina Marianistas in San Isidro, in 1978, he composed a story about reflections on birth for Mother's Day. His writings began to be set to music when he formed his first band with his brother and friends called Paranoia.

At 18, he attended the University of Lima, graduating with a degree in communications. In 1987, he formed the band Arena Hash with his brother Patricio, Arturo Pomar, and Christian Meier. A few years later the band broke up and Suárez-Vértiz began a solo career.

== Musical career ==
=== 1985–1991: Arena Hash ===
Pedro Suárez-Vértiz formed his first band with his brother Patricio, Arturo Pomar Jr. and Álex Kornhuber, called Paranoia at the Colegio María Reina Marianistas in the San Isidro District of Lima. A short time later, at the age of 16, the band developed into Arena Hash. In 1985 they signed with the CBS record label. The band consisted of Suárez-Vértiz and his brother Patricio, Arturo Pomar Jr. and Christian Meier. The group released two albums: Arena Hash (1988), which featured songs such as "Cuando La Cama Me Da Vueltas" and "Me Resfrié en Brasil", and Ah, Ah, Ah (1991), which featured songs such as "Y Es Que Sucede Así", "A Ese Infierno No Voy a Volver", and "El Rey del Ah Ah Ah". The band was among the most popular in Peru during the 1980s and 1990s.

=== 1992–2000: First studio albums ===
After Arena Hash disbanded, Suárez-Vértiz pursued a solo career. In 1993, he released his first solo album entitled (No existen) Técnicas Para Olvidar, with songs such as "Cuéntame", "Globos de Gas" and "Me Elevé". Thanks to this album he obtained a contract with Sony Music. In 1996, he released his second album entitled Póntelo en la lengua with songs such as "Los Globos del Cielo", "Mi Auto Era Una Rana" and "Me Estoy Enamorando". The album exceeded 40 thousand copies sold was the highest selling album in Peru in 1996. The album became his most successful, selling in total over 100,000 copies.

The song "Mi auto era una rana" was featured the soundtrack of the Peruvian film Don't Tell Anyone, while "Me estoy enamorando" was part of the Chilean soap opera, A todo dar, made by Mega in 1998. In that same year, after the Super Feria de la Molina, a television channel made a special called Hecho en el Perú, in its second edition, this time with rock, for which Pedro formed a minigroup with his brother, Patricio Suárez-Vértiz, German González and Anna Carina.

In 1999, he released his third production entitled Degeneración Actual, which featured experimentations in styles such as hip hop, reggae, ska and electronica. From this album there are songs such as "Degeneración Actual", "Un Vino, Una Cerveza", "Alguien Que Bese Como Tú" and "El Secreto En Tu Mente". Other songs on the album such as "Placeres Y Dolor" and "Cuando El Sol Va a Salir" were known for their appearance in the Peruvian series Mil Oficios.

=== 2001–2008: Play and Talk Show ===
In 2003, Suárez-Vértiz released his first greatest hits album entitled Anecdotas, which compiled the hits of his first three albums. For his next album, Play, he ended his contract with Sony Music and released it on his own Solver Label in 2004. The songs "Bailar", "Lo Olvidé", and "Cuando Pienses En Volver" stood out. In 2005, his song "El Triunfo Tan Soñado" was the anthem of the 2005 FIFA U-17 World Championship held in Peru, which would be included on his next album.

In 2006, he released his album Talk Show, with songs such as "No Llores Más, Morena" and "Como las Mariposas", which was included on the soundtrack of the film Talk Show. The following year, he released his second compilation album where compiled songs from the albums Play (2004) and Talk Show (2006). For this album Pedro signed with the record company Warner Music Spain. In 2007, he was diagnosed with dysarthria.

=== 2009–2010: Amazonas and international tours ===
In 2009, Pedro Suárez-Vértiz presented his sixth studio album Amazonas, under the production of Thom Russo. It was his first album after signing with Warner Music Spain. This was recorded between Los Angeles and London. As the first single he released the song "Amazonas", which became a Latin song representative of Expo 2008. The song also identified the Recicla Mueve el Mundo campaign of the Madrid City Council in Spain on the occasion of World Environment Day. The second single, "Nadia", a song he performed as a duet with Peruvian tenor Juan Diego Flórez, entered the Billboard chart among the top 50 songs in November.

During 2010 he toured Peru, the United States and Spain. The same year, Suárez-Vértiz released Amazonas Uncut, a special edition of his previous album. In the following years, he performed in Madrid and in the Italian cities of Milan and Rome, and had a special participation in the video clip "Me Cansé" by Peruvian singer Anna Carina in 2012. In 2013, Suárez-Vértiz and Gian Marco recorded the compilation album El Encuentro that contains 16 songs, accompanied by a gastronomy book, which has been published by a bank agency for its clients.

=== 2011–2023: Illness and later career ===
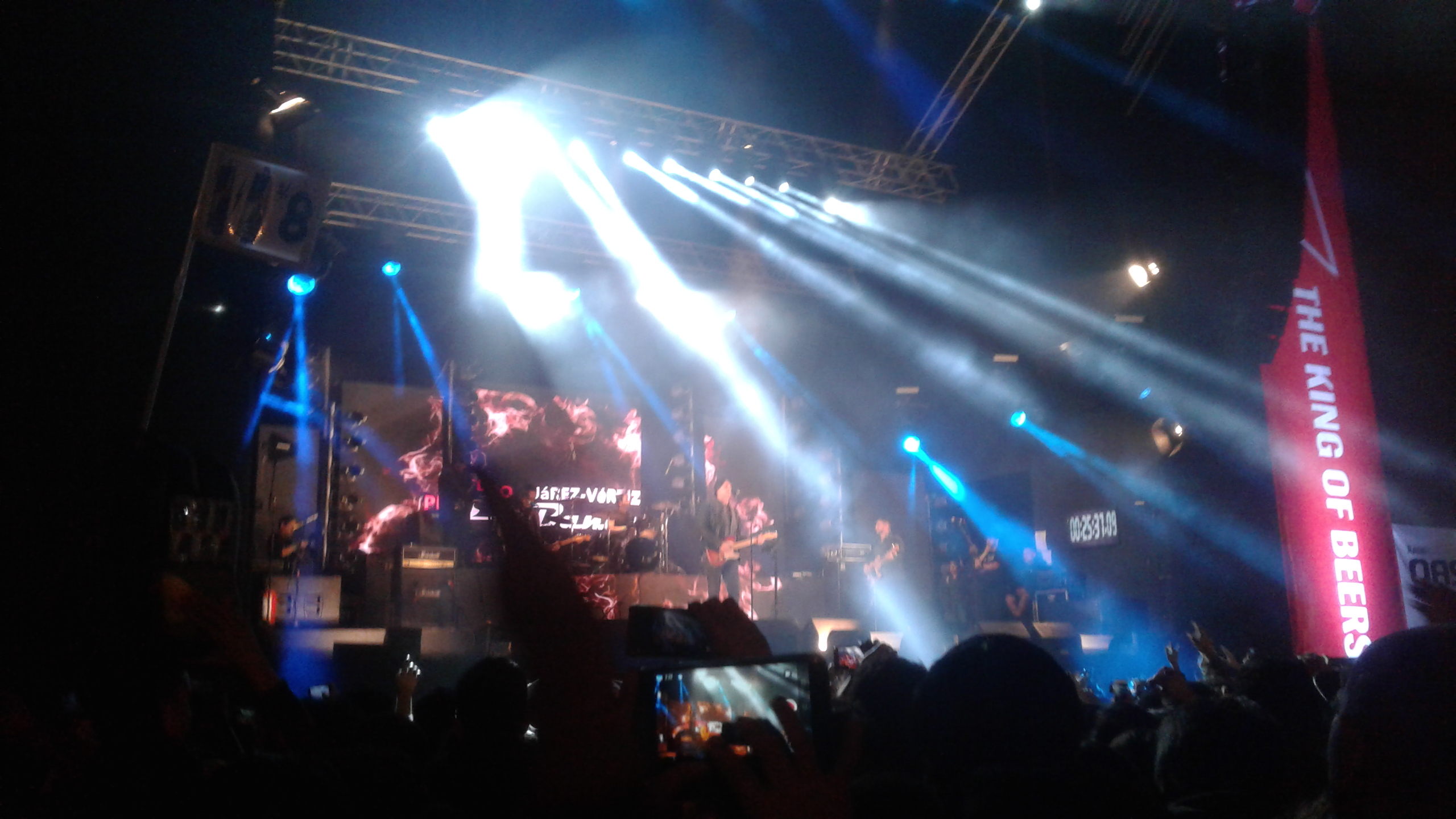
Pedro Suárez-Vértiz - La Banda, a band created in collaboration with Pedro Suárez-Vértiz to perform his music due to his inability to sing, performing in 2018,

In 2011, Pedro started showing obvious signs of bad diction. He revealed that he had been diagnosed with progressive bulbar palsy. This caused him to stop being able to sing anymore. He also he admitted to suffering from chronic attention deficit hyperactivity disorder which made him look extremely distracted and tangled in speech. This significantly affected his ability to sing.

In 2014, he produced the event "Cuando Pienses En Volver", a tribute to his music with the presence of many Peruvian and international artists. He produced an album after the festival in which Pedro Suárez-Vértiz La Banda sang, which is when they began to perform in concerts under that name, allowed by Pedro as he was unable to sing.

On 13 January 2017, he released a new song, after eight years without releasing new productions, with the help of his eponymous band, called Siempre aquí en mi piel. It is unpublished material written between 2009 and 2011. On 20 July 2018, the United States Senate recognized the career of Pedro Suárez-Vértiz in the framework of the 197th Anniversary of the Independence of Peru. U.S. Senate Representative, Joe Crowley, the OAS, and the Capitol Hall of Honors presented the artist with a medal, a U.S. flag folded in a triangle, and a proclamation written on behalf of the U.S. Congress.

Pedro Suárez-Vértiz was selected to compose the official song of the 2019 Pan American Games which was held in Lima, titled "Jugamos todos". On 24 and 29 September 2019, the musical "Cuéntame" was performed at the Amphitheater of the Parque de la Exposición in Lima with the production of Los Productores.

On 18 October 2023, with the help of artificial intelligence, he released his latest and last song, entitled "Amor, yo te perdí la fe". The song, sponsored by the dairy company Yoleit, had been written before his loss of vocals.

== Personal life ==
Pedro Suárez-Vértiz was married to Cynthia Martinez, with whom he had 3 children: María José, Salvador, and Tomás. According to Pedro, they met in 1991 while walking through Miraflores, when Pedro was with Arena Hash, and used to visit each other by seeing each other in secret from the rooftops of their neighbors. They married in 1994 and had a religious wedding in 2000, after having their first two children: María José and Salvador.

In 2007, he was diagnosed with dysarthria, in which he had difficulties speaking and breathing, generally problems with coordination, intensity of voice, diction, etc., for which Pedro had to move away from the stage. Later his neurologist confirmed that he had bulbar palsy.

Since the release of his sixth studio album Amazonas in 2009, he would support numerous charities and philanthropic organizations throughout Peru and Latin America . He collaborated with the NGO Bomberos Unidos Sin Fronteras (BUSF) from Spain, which funded several water purification plants in the Peruvian rainforest.

In 2011, Pedro started showing obvious signs of bad diction. He revealed that he had been diagnosed with progressive bulbar palsy. This caused him to stop being able to sing anymore. He also he admitted to suffering from chronic attention deficit hyperactivity disorder which made him look extremely distracted and tangled in speech. This significantly affected his ability to sing. Suárez-Vértiz declared that he regretted having proclaimed his defect, for he only drew attention to it.

After diagnosed and with the inability to sing, Suárez-Vértiz spoke out about his life story on social media posts,

In 2013, away from the stage, he published his first book: Yo, Pedro.

== Death ==
Suárez-Vértiz died from cardiac arrest in his home in Miraflores, Lima, on 28 December 2023 at 6:55am, at the age of 54. He was given a final farewell at a funeral mass in the Iglesia Virgen de Fátima in the Miraflores district. Hours later, his remains were transferred to the Jardines de la Paz cemetery in the La Molina district, where they were finally cremated. He is survived by his wife and 3 children. Waldemar Cerrón, member of the Congress of the Republic of Peru, submitted a motion to recognize the accomplishments of Suárez-Vértiz, with Cerrón noting that his music "contributes to maintaining cultural identity among Peruvian citizens living abroad."

== Legacy ==
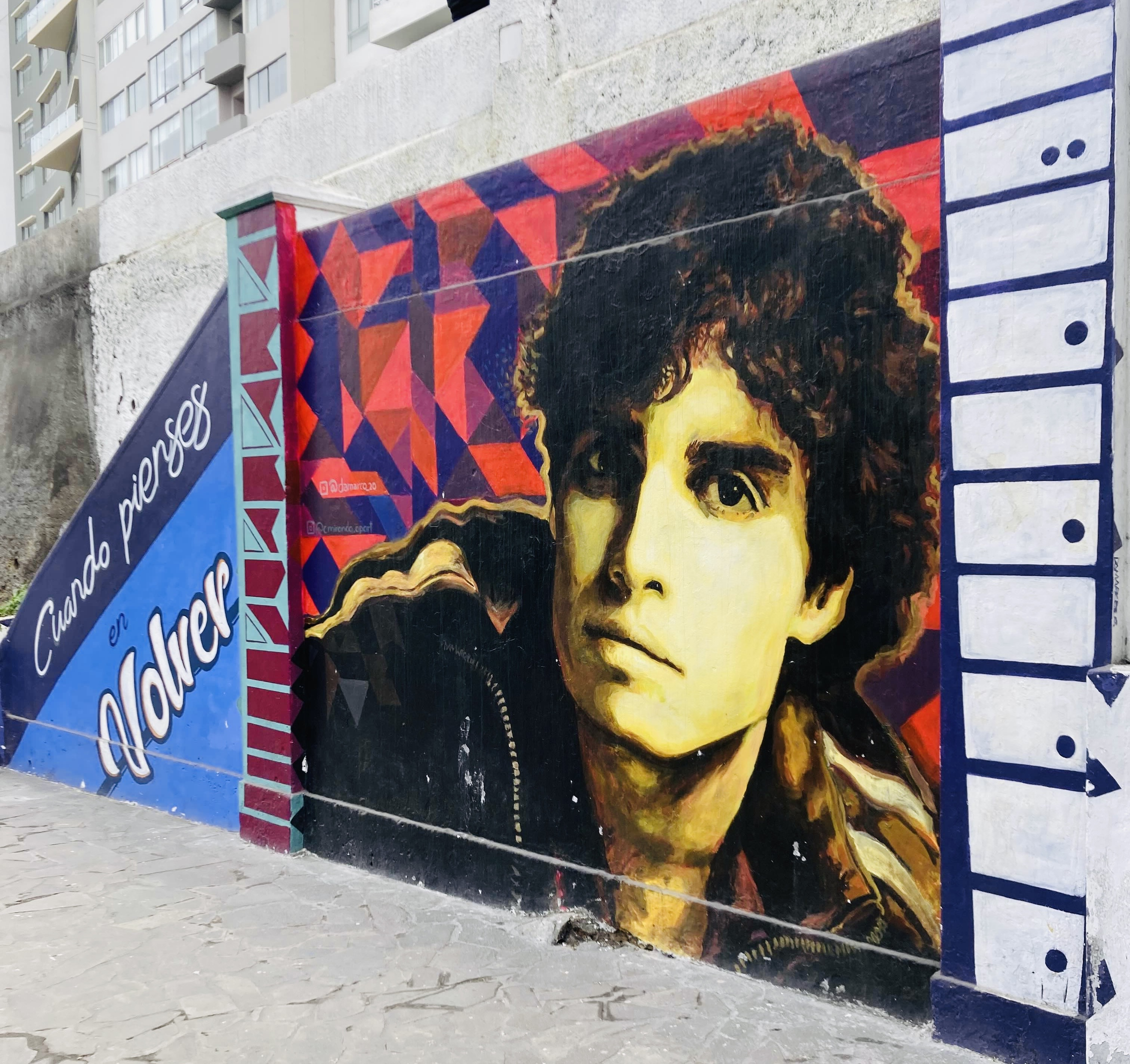
Mural of Pedro Suárez-Vértiz in the Miraflores District, Lima

Pedro Suárez-Vértiz is recognized as one of the greater Peruvian rockers of all time. Many murals exist of the singer, the most notable being in the Bajada Balta and the Bajada de Baños in Miraflores and Barranco districts of Lima. The Billboard recognizes him as an "icon of Peruvian rock", and his song Los Globos del Cielo as "a timeless masterpiece of rock in Spanish". Publisher Francisco Melgar describes him as, "He became the most successful composer of rock songs for almost twenty-five years".

He is recognized for his deep understanding in the meaning of life, love, and the ability to get over challenges which largely guided him in his songs. He is praised for his philanthropic and environmental preservation works. His music and writing is remembered by many through Peru and Latin America.

== Awards and nominations ==
Pedro Suárez-Vértiz had been nominated and won numerous awards throughout his career. In 2004, he was winner of the Orgullosamente Latino award and was awarded Best Latin Soloist of the Year in Mexico. In a 2004 vote by TeleHit Música, he was selected as Latin Soloist of the Year. In September 2010, he was awarded the Save The Planet award at the Hylton Performing Arts Center in Washington, D.C., in recognition of his musical and charitable work towards the environment. He also won numerous awards at the Premios Luces by El Comercio. In 2024 he was nominated for the awards of the Peruvian Chamber of Music, held by the Apdayc and other guilds of the musical arts.

== Discography ==
=== With Arena Hash ===
- Arena Hash (1988)
- Ah, Ah, Ah (1990)
- Del Archivo de... Arena Hash (1995)

=== Solo career ===
- (No existen) Técnicas Para Olvidar (1993)
- Póntelo en la lengua (1996)
- Degeneración Actual (1999)
- Play (2004)
- Talk Show (2006)
- Amazonas (2009)
