= Christian Meier =

Peruvian actor, director and singer (born 1970)

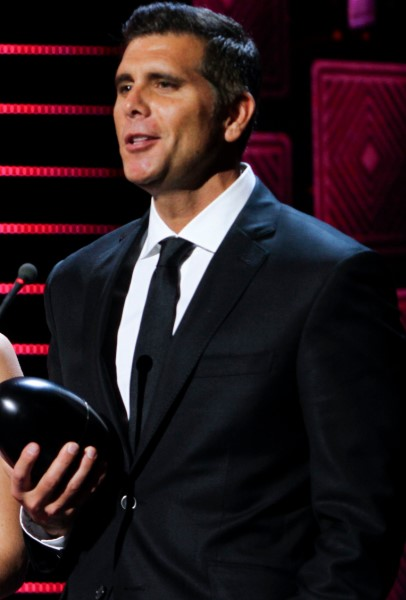
- Meier in 2015
- Born: Christian Dietrich Meier Zender; 23 June 1970 (age 56); Lima, Peru
- Occupations: Actor, singer
- Years active: 1988–present
- Height: 1.83 m (6 ft 0 in)
- Spouses: Marisol Aguirre (m. 1995; div. 2008) Andrea Bosio (m. 2023)
- Children: 3
- Mother: Gladys Zender

Christian Dietrich Meier Zender (born 23 June 1970) is a Peruvian actor, producer, director and singer/songwriter in Latin America, the U.S. Hispanic market, and around the Spanish-speaking world.

== Biography ==
Meier was born in Lima, Peru, the youngest of four siblings. He is the son of Gladys Zender, Miss Universe 1957, and Antonio Meier, a Peruvian politician who in 2006 was elected mayor of the Lima district of San Isidro. He has two older sisters and one older brother: Sibylle Meier Zender, Karina Meier Zender, and Antonio Meier Zender.

Raised in the Roman Catholic faith, Christian Meier studied at the Miraflores Maristas School, a Marist Brothers congregation school. After finishing high school he studied Graphic Design graduating in early 1992.

== Career ==
=== Musician ===
In 1987, he formed the popular Peruvian alternative-rock band Arena Hash with Pedro Suárez Vértiz, Patricio Suárez Vértiz and Arturo Pomar. Between the 1980s and early 1990s, he was the keyboardist of the band, and also did some singing. A few years later, the band broke up, and some of its members pursued a solo career.

In 1996, Meier released an album, No Me Acuerdo Quién Fui, which produced the singles, "tus huellas entre la mías", and "Carreteras Mojadas" ("Wet Highways") that got the first positions in almost all radio station charts in Peru. the album went double platinum. In 1997 began the production of his second album, Primero en Mojarme, with Manuel Garrido-Lecca, a well known musical producer that he worked with in Arena Hash.

In 2002, he produced Once Noches, probably the album that brought him the most accolades. It contained the singles "Alguien" and "Novia de nadie", a duet featuring Spanish singer Mikel Erentxun.

In May of 2026 he opened for Ed Sheeran during his concert in Lima, Perú as part of his Loop Tour.

=== Acting ===
Meier has acted and starred in both soap operas and movies. His success has brought him fame in Latin American countries, in the United States, Spanish-speaking media, and around the Spanish-speaking world. He also has his own line of perfumes and appeared in commercials.

== Personal life ==
He married Peruvian actress Marisol Aguirre in 1995. They met during the filming of the soap opera "Gorrión". They separated in October 2007, finalizing their divorce in November 2008. They have three children together. Meier married fellow Peruvian Andrea Bosio in July 2023.

== Discography ==
=== With Arena Hash ===
- Arena Hash (1988)
- Ah, Ah, Ah (1991)
- El Archivo De Arena Hash (1995)

=== Solo career ===
- No Me Acuerdo Quien Fuí (1996)
- Primero En Mojarme (1999)
- Once Noches (2002)
- Nada Ha Cambiado (2016)
- He Vuelto a Casa (2023)
- Así Es La Ley (2026)

== Filmography ==
=== Film roles ===
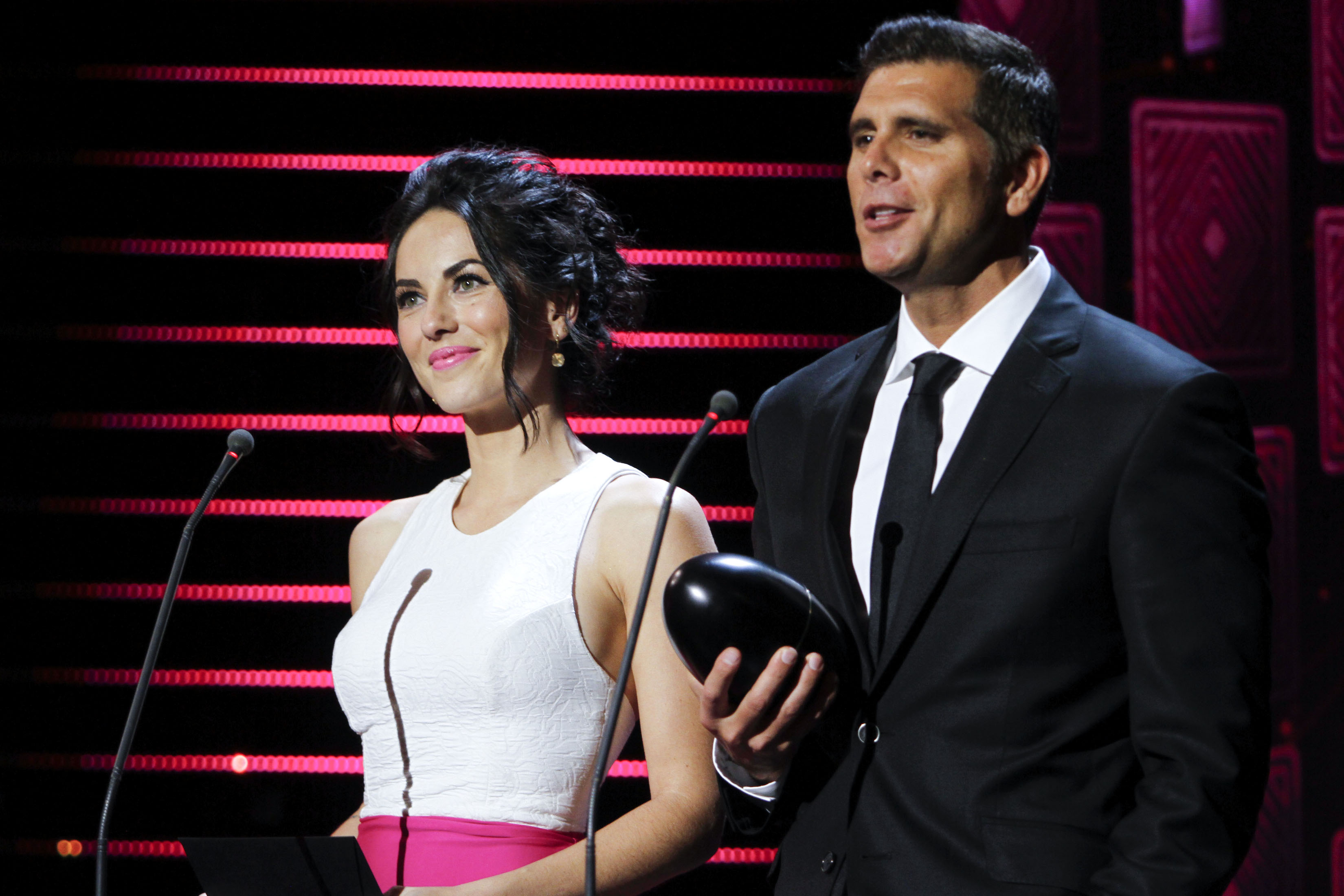
Meier and Bárbara Mori at the 2015 Fénix Awards.

Year	Title	Roles	Notes
1994	Watchers III	The Outsider	
1998	No se lo digas a nadie	Gonzalo	
2000	Ciudad de M	Pacho	
2005	La mujer de mi hermano	Ignacio / Ishan-husband	
2008	Valentino y el clan del can	Valentino	Animated film; voice role
2012	Mar de Fondo	Luis	
2015	¡Asu mare! 2	Ricky	
2015	Magallanes	Augusto Rivero	
2016	All Men Are the Same	Joaquín	
2017	Todas las mujeres son iguales	Joaquín	
2017	Doble	Lorenzo	
2024	Mistura	Roberto Tapia	
2024	¿Vienes o voy?	Esteban Ferrer	

=== Television roles ===
Year	Title	Roles	Notes
1994–1995	Gorrión (telenovela)	Gabriel Maidana	Main role; 154 episodes
1996	Obsesión	Jimmy Martel / Jano	Main role; 160 episodes
1997	Escándalo	Álvaro Dupont	Main role; 120 episodes
1998–1999	Luz María	Gustavo Gonzálvez	Main role; 175 episodes
1999	Me muero por ti	Alfonso Hidalgo	Main role; 91 episodes
1999	Isabella, mujer enamorada	Fernando De Alvear	Main role; 138 episodes
2001	Amores, querer con alevosía	Pablo Herreros	Main role; 64 episodes
2001–2002	Lo que es el amor	Efrén Villarreal	Main role; 68 episodes
2003	Luciana y Nicolás	Nicolás Echevarría	Main role; 120 episodes
2004–2005	Luna, la heredera	Mauricio García	Main role; 120 episodes
2005–2006	La Tormenta	Santos Torrealba	Main role; 216 episodes
2007	Decisiones	Troquero	Episode: "Amor de carretera"
2007	El Zorro, la espada y la rosa	Diego de la Vega / El Zorro	Main role; 90 episodes
2008–2009	Doña Bárbara	Santos Luzardo	Main role; 190 episodes
2010–2011	Alguien te mira	Rodrigo Quintana	Main role; 116 episodes
2011	The First Lady	Leonardo Santander	Main role; 150 episodes
2012–2013	Lynch	Emilio Triana	Recurring role (seasons 1–2); 6 episodes
2013	Cumbia Ninja	Willy	Recurring role (season 1); 13 episodes
2013	Arranque de pasión	Jordi Fernández	Main role; 15 episodes
2014	Familia en venta	Santiago	Main role; 13 episodes
2014	La malquerida	Esteban Domínguez	Main role; 117 episodes
2013	Cosita linda	Diego Luján	Main role; 146 episodes
2019–2020	El General Naranjo	Óscar Naranjo	Main role (seasons 1–3); 60 episodes
