= List of drama films of the 2020s =

This is a list of drama films of the 2020s.

== 2020 ==
Title	Director	Cast	Country	Subgenre/notes
2 Hearts	Lance Hool	Jacob Elordi, Adan Canto, Tiera Skovbye, Radha Mitchell	United States	Romantic drama
3 Monkeys	Anil Kumar G	Sudigali Sudheer, Getup Srinu, Auto Ram Prasad, Shakalaka Shankar, Karunya Chowdary, Kautilya	India	Comedy-drama
23 Walks	Paul Morrison	Alison Steadman, Dave Johns, Graham Cole, Bob Goody	United Kingdom	Comedy-drama
A Call to Spy	Lydia Dean Pilcher	Sarah Megan Thomas, Stana Katic, Radhika Apte	United States	Historical drama
Ala Vaikunthapurramuloo	Trivikram Srinivas	Allu Arjun, Pooja Hegde	India	Action drama
All Day and a Night	Joe Robert Cole	Ashton Sanders, Jeffrey Wright, Regina Taylor, Yahya Abdul-Mateen II	United States	
All My Life	Marc Meyers	Jessica Rothe, Harry Shum Jr., Michael Masini, Chrissie Fit, Greg Vrotsos, Jay Pharoah	United States	
All Together Now	Brett Haley	Auliʻi Cravalho, Rhenzy Feliz, Judy Reyes, Justina Machado, Taylor Richardson, C.S. Lee, Anthony Jacques Jr., Gerald Issac Waters, Fred Armisen, Carol Burnett	United States	
Ammonite	Francis Lee	Kate Winslet, Saoirse Ronan, Gemma Jones, James McArdle, Alec Secăreanu, Fiona Shaw	United Kingdom, Australia	Romantic drama
An American Pickle	Brandon Trost	Seth Rogen, Sarah Snook	United States	Comedy-drama
Another Round	Thomas Vinterberg	Mads Mikkelsen, Thomas Bo Larsen, Magnus Millang, Lars Ranthe	Denmark, Sweden	
Black Beauty	Ashley Avis	Mackenzie Foy, Kate Winslet, Claire Forlani, Iain Glen, Fern Deacon	United States	
Capone	Josh Trank	Tom Hardy, Linda Cardellini, Jack Lowden, Noel Fisher, Kyle MacLachlan, Matt Dillon, Al Sapienza	United States	Crime biopic
Charm City Kings	Angel Manuel Soto	Jahi Di'Allo Winston, Meek Mill, Will Catlett, Teyonah Parris	United States	
Chemical Hearts	Richard Tanne	Lili Reinhart, Austin Abrams	United States	Romantic drama
Clouds	Justin Baldoni	Fin Argus, Sabrina Carpenter, Madison Iseman, Neve Campbell, Tom Everett Scott, Lil Rel Howery	United States	Musical drama
Court Martial	Sourabh Srivastava	Rajeev Khandelwal, Saksham Dayma, Swapnil Kotiwar	India	
Crazy Awesome Teachers	Sammaria Simanjuntak	Gading Marten, Boris Bokir, Kevin Ardilova	Indonesia	Comedy-drama
Downhill	Nat Faxon, Jim Rash	Julia Louis-Dreyfus, Will Ferrell	United States	Dark comedy-drama
Echo Boomers	Seth Savoy	Patrick Schwarzenegger, Michael Shannon, Alex Pettyfer	United States	Crime drama
Emma	Autumn de Wilde	Anya Taylor-Joy, Johnny Flynn, Josh O'Connor, Callum Turner, Mia Goth, Miranda Hart, Bill Nighy	United Kingdom	Comedy-drama
Emperor	Mark Amin	Dayo Okeniyi, James Cromwell, Kat Graham, Bruce Dern, Ben Robson, M. C. Gainey, Mykelti Williamson	United States	Historical drama
Falling	Viggo Mortensen	Viggo Mortensen, Lance Henriksen, Sverrir Gudnason, Laura Linney, Hannah Gross, Terry Chen, David Cronenberg	United States, United Kingdom, Canada	
Fatima	Marco Pontecorvo	Joaquim de Almeida, Goran Visnjic, Stephanie Gil, Alejandra Howard, Jorge Lamelas, Lúcia Moniz, Marco d'Almeida, Joana Ribeiro, Harvey Keitel, Sônia Braga	United States	Christian drama
Horse Girl	Jeff Baena	Alison Brie, Debby Ryan, John Reynolds, Molly Shannon, John Ortiz, Paul Reiser	United States	Psychological drama
Home	Franka Potente	Jake McLaughlin, Kathy Bates, Aisling Franciosi, Derek Richardson, James Jordan, Lil Rel Howery, Stephen Root	Germany, France, Netherlands	
I Still Believe	Erwin brothers	KJ Apa, Britt Robertson, Gary Sinise	United States	Christian drama
Ma Rainey's Black Bottom	George C. Wolfe	Viola Davis, Chadwick Boseman, Glynn Turman, Colman Domingo, Michael Potts	United States	
Never Rarely Sometimes Always	Eliza Hittman	Sidney Flanigan, Talia Ryder, Théodore Pellerin, Ryan Eggold, Sharon Van Etten	United States	
Nomadland	Chloé Zhao	Frances McDormand, David Strathairn, Linda May, Charlene Swankie, Bob Wells	United States	
On the Rocks	Sofia Coppola	Bill Murray, Rashida Jones, Marlon Wayans	United States	Comedy-drama
Percy	Clark Johnson	Christopher Walken, Christina Ricci, Zach Braff, Luke Kirby, Adam Beach, Martin Donovan, Roberta Maxwell, Peter Stebbings	United States, Canada, India	Biographical drama
Players	Pyi Hein Thiha	Myint Myat, Htun Htun, Tyron Bejay, Khin Hlaing, Soe Myat Thuzar, Ei Chaw Po, May Mi Ko Ko, Hsaung Wutyee May	Myanmar	Comedy-drama
Powerful Chief	Henry Vallejo	Jesús Luque Colque, Mario Velásquez, Leonardo Villa, Sol Calatayud, Gaby Huaywa, Yiliana Chong, Henry Peláez, Julissa Paredes	Peru	
Stargirl	Julia Hart	Grace VanderWaal, Graham Verchere	United States	Jukebox musical, romantic drama
The King of Staten Island	Judd Apatow	Pete Davidson, Marisa Tomei, Bill Burr, Bel Powley, Maude Apatow, Steve Buscemi	United States	Comedy-drama
The Last Vermeer	Dan Friedkin	Guy Pearce, Claes Bang	United States	Drama
The Legend of Inikpi	Frank Rajah Arase	Nancy Ameh, Mercy Johnson, Sam Dede, Paul Obazele	Nigeria	
The Life Ahead	Edoardo Ponti	Sophia Loren, Ibrahima Gueye, Abril Zamora, Renato Carpentieri, Babak Karimi	United States, Italy	
The One and Only Ivan	Thea Sharrock	Sam Rockwell, Angelina Jolie, Danny DeVito, Helen Mirren, Brooklynn Prince, Ramón Rodríguez, Ariana Greenblatt, Bryan Cranston	United States	Hybrid animation, fantasy drama
The Trial of the Chicago 7	Aaron Sorkin	Yahya Abdul-Mateen II, Sacha Baron Cohen, Daniel Flaherty, Joseph Gordon-Levitt, Michael Keaton, Frank Langella, John Carroll Lynch, Eddie Redmayne, Noah Robbins, Mark Rylance, Alex Sharp, Jeremy Strong	United States	Historical legal drama
The Water Man	David Oyelowo	David Oyelowo, Rosario Dawson, Lonnie Chavis, Amiah Miller, Alfred Molina, Maria Bello	United States	
Tigertail	Alan Yang	Tzi Ma, Christine Ko, Hayden Szeto, Lee Hong-chi, Kunjue Li, Fiona Fu, Yang Kuei-mei, James Saito, Joan Chen	United States	
Trance	Anwar Rasheed	Fahadh Faasil, Dileesh Pothan, Gautham Vasudev Menon, Chemban Vinod Jose, Nazriya Nazim, Soubin Shahir, Vinayakan	India	
Undine	Christian Petzold	Paula Beer, Franz Rogowski	Germany, France	
Unpregnant	Rachel Lee Goldenberg	Haley Lu Richardson, Barbie Ferreira, Alex MacNicoll, Breckin Meyer, Giancarlo Esposito, Sugar Lyn Beard, Betty Who, Mary McCormack, Denny Love, Ramona Young, Kara Royster	United States	
Words on Bathroom Walls	Thor Freudenthal	Charlie Plummer, Andy García, Taylor Russell, AnnaSophia Robb, Beth Grant, Molly Parker, Walton Goggins	United States	Comedy-drama
World Famous Lover	Kranthi Madhav	Vijay Deverakonda, Aishwarya Rajesh, Raashi Khanna, Catherine Tresa, Izabelle Leite	India	Romantic drama
Yeh Ballet	Sooni Taraporevala	Julian Sands, Achintya Bose, Manish Chauhan	United States	

== 2021 ==
Title	Director	Cast	Country	Subgenre/notes
83	Kabir Khan	Ranveer Singh, Deepika Padukone, Tahir Raj Bhasin, Saqib Saleem, Ammy Virk, Harrdy Sandhu, Jiiva	India	Sports drama
After We Fell	Castillo Landon	Josephine Langford, Hero Fiennes Tiffin, Louise Lombard, Rob Estes, Arielle Kebbel, Chance Perdomo, Frances Turner, Kiana Madeira, Carter Jenkins, Mira Sorvino	United States, United Kingdom, France	Romantic drama
Atrangi Re	Aanand L. Rai	Akshay Kumar, Dhanush, Sara Ali Khan	India	Romantic drama
Being the Ricardos	Aaron Sorkin	Nicole Kidman, Javier Bardem, J. K. Simmons, Nina Arianda, Tony Hale, Alia Shawkat, Jake Lacy, Clark Gregg	United States	Biographical drama
Belfast	Kenneth Branagh	Judi Dench, Caitríona Balfe, Jamie Dornan, Ciarán Hinds, Jude Hill	United Kingdom	Biographical drama
Benedetta	Paul Verhoeven	Virginie Efira, Lambert Wilson, Daphne Patakia, Olivier Rabourdin, Clotilde Courau, Charlotte Rampling, Hervé Pierre	France, Netherlands	Biographical drama
Bhuj: The Pride of India	Abhishek Dudhaiya	Ajay Devgn, Sanjay Dutt, Sharad Kelkar, Sonakshi Sinha, Ammy Virk, Pranitha Subhash, Nora Fatehi	India	War drama
Breaking News in Yuba County	Tate Taylor	Allison Janney, Mila Kunis, Regina Hall, Awkwafina, Wanda Sykes, Juliette Lewis	United States	Comedy drama
Bruised	Halle Berry	Halle Berry, Shamier Anderson, Adan Canto, Sheila Atim	United Kingdom, United States	Sports drama
Concrete Cowboy	Ricky Staub	Idris Elba, Caleb McLaughlin, Jharrel Jerome, Lorraine Toussaint, Byron Bowers, Method Man	United States	Western drama
Cyrano	Joe Wright	Peter Dinklage, Haley Bennett, Ben Mendelsohn, Brian Tyree Henry, Kelvin Harrison Jr.	United States, United Kingdom	Musical drama
Dear Evan Hansen	Stephen Chbosky	Ben Platt, Julianne Moore, Kaitlyn Dever, Amy Adams, Danny Pino, Colton Ryan, Amandla Stenberg, Nik Dodani	United States	Musical, teen drama
Desert Dolphin	Manjari Makijany	Rachel Sanchita Gupta, Shafin Patel, Amrit Maghera, Jonathan Readwin, Waheeda Rehman	India, United States	Coming-of-age sports drama
Don't Go to School Tomorrow	Diego Barragan	Paco García, Krystian Huerta	Mexico	
Drishyam 2: The Redemption	Jeethu Joseph	Mohanlal Viswanathan, Meena, Ansiba Hassan, Esther Anil	India	Family drama
Fatherhood	Paul Weitz	Kevin Hart, Alfre Woodard, Melody Hurd, Lil Rel Howery, Paul Reiser, DeWanda Wise	United States	
Finch	Miguel Sapochnik	Tom Hanks, Caleb Landry Jones, Samira Wiley, Laura Harrier, Skeet Ulrich	United States	Sci-fi, drama
Finding You	Brian Baugh	Rose Reid, Jedidiah Goodacre, Katherine McNamara, Patrick Bergin, Saoirse-Monica Jackson, Judith Hoag, Tom Everett Scott, Vanessa Redgrave	United States	Coming-of-age comedy drama
Firebird	Peeter Rebane	Tom Prior, Oleg Zagorodnii, Diana Pozharskaya	United Kingdom, Estonia	Romantic war drama
Freaks Out	Gabriele Mainetti	Claudio Santamaria, Pietro Castellitto, Giancarlo Martini, Aurora Giovinazzo, Giorgio Tirabassi, Max Mazzotta, Franz Rogowski	Italy	Fantasy drama
Ghostbusters: Afterlife	Jason Reitman	Carrie Coon, Finn Wolfhard, Mckenna Grace, Paul Rudd	United States	Supernatural comedy-drama
God of Cricket	Sudesh Kanojia	Sangram Singh	India	Biographical sports drama
In the Heights	Jon M. Chu	Anthony Ramos, Corey Hawkins, Leslie Grace, Melissa Barrera, Olga Merediz, Daphne Rubin-Vega, Gregory Diaz IV, Stephanie Beatriz, Dascha Polanco, Jimmy Smits	United States	Musical drama
Jersey	Gowtam Tinnanuri	Shahid Kapoor, Mrunal Thakur, Pankaj Kapur	India	Sports drama
A Journal for Jordan	Denzel Washington	Michael B. Jordan, Chanté Adams	United States	War drama
Judas and the Black Messiah	Shaka King	Daniel Kaluuya, Lakeith Stanfield	United States	Biographical drama
Kaadan	Prabhu Solomon	Rana Daggubati, Vishnu Vishal, Pulkit Samrat, Zoya Hussain, Shriya Pilgaonkar	India	
King Richard	Reinaldo Marcus Green	Will Smith, Aunjanue Ellis, Jon Bernthal, Saniyya Sidney, Demi Singleton, Liev Schreiber, Dylan McDermott	United States	Biographical drama
Land	Robin Wright	Robin Wright, Demián Bichir, Kim Dickens	United States	
Licorice Pizza	Paul Thomas Anderson	Alana Haim, Cooper Hoffman, Sean Penn, Tom Waits, Bradley Cooper, Benny Safdie	United States	
Little Fish	Chad Hartigan	Olivia Cooke, Jack O'Connell, Raúl Castillo, Soko	United States	Romantic sci-fi drama
Luca	Enrico Casarosa	Jacob Tremblay, Jack Dylan Grazer, Emma Berman, Saverio Raimondo, Maya Rudolph, Marco Barricelli, Jim Gaffigan	United States	Animated fantasy, drama
Madam Chief Minister	Subhash Kapoor	Richa Chadda	India	Political drama
Maidaan	Amit Ravindernath Sharma	Ajay Devgn	India	Biographical sports-drama
Malcolm & Marie	Sam Levinson	Zendaya, John David Washington	United States	Romantic drama
Naked Singularity	Chase Palmer	John Boyega, Olivia Cooke, Bill Skarsgård, Ed Skrein, Linda Lavin, Tim Blake Nelson, Robia Deville	United States	Legal drama
Paris, 13th District	Jacques Audiard	Lucie Zheng, Makita Samba, Jehnny Beth, Noémie Merlant	France	
Ramprasad Ki Tehrvi	Seema Pahwa	Naseeruddin Shah, Vinay Pathak, Vikrant Massey, Konkona Sen Sharma, Vineet Kumar, Manoj Pahwa, Parambrata Chattopadhyay, Supriya Pathak, Deepika Amin, Ninad Kamat	India	Family drama
Respect	Liesl Tommy	Jennifer Hudson	United States	Biographical drama
RRR	S. S. Rajamouli	N. T. Rama Rao Jr., Ram Charan, Alia Bhatt, Ajay Devgn	India	Period action drama
Sardar Udham Singh	Shoojit Sircar	Vicky Kaushal, Banita Sandhu	India	Biographical drama
The Great Indian Kitchen	Jeo Baby	Nimisha Sajayan, Suraj Venjaramood	India	
The Last Duel	Ridley Scott	Matt Damon, Adam Driver, Jodie Comer, Ben Affleck	United States	Historical drama-thriller
The Last Letter from Your Lover	Augustine Frizzell	Felicity Jones, Shailene Woodley, Callum Turner, Nabhaan Rizwan, Joe Alwyn, Ncuti Gatwa	United States	Romantic drama
The Many Saints of Newark	Alan Taylor	Alessandro Nivola, Leslie Odom Jr., Jon Bernthal, Corey Stoll, Michael Gandolfini, Billy Magnussen, John Magaro, Michela De Rossi, Ray Liotta, Vera Farmiga	United States	Crime drama
The Map of Tiny Perfect Things	Ian Samuels	Kathryn Newton, Kyle Allen	United States	
The Power of the Dog	Jane Campion	Benedict Cumberbatch, Kirsten Dunst, Jesse Plemons, Thomasin McKenzie, Kodi Smit-McPhee	United Kingdom, Australia, United States, Canada, New Zealand	Drama
The Souvenir Part II	Joanna Hogg	Honor Swinton Byrne, Tilda Swinton, Charlie Heaton, Harris Dickinson, Joe Alwyn	United States, United Kingdom	
The United States vs. Billie Holiday	Lee Daniels	Andra Day, Trevante Rhodes, Garrett Hedlund, Natasha Lyonne, Da'Vine Joy Randolph	United States	Biographical drama
Tick, Tick... Boom!	Lin-Manuel Miranda	Andrew Garfield, Alexandra Shipp, Robin de Jesús, Joshua Henry, Judith Light, Vanessa Hudgens	United States	Musical drama
Violet	Justine Bateman	Olivia Munn, Luke Bracey, Justin Theroux, Bonnie Bedelia, Zachary Gordon, Erica Ash, Rob Benedict, Dennis Boutsikaris, Todd Stashwick, Laura San Giacomo	United States	
West Side Story	Steven Spielberg	Ansel Elgort, Rachel Zegler, Ariana DeBose, David Alvarez, Mike Faist, Corey Stoll, Brian d’Arcy James, Rita Moreno	United States	Romantic musical drama

== 2022 ==
Title	Director	Cast	Country	Subgenre/notes
A Jazzman's Blues	Tyler Perry	Joshua Boone, Solea Pfeiffer, Brent Antonello, Brad Benedict, Ryan Eggold, Milauna Jemai Jackson, Kario Marcel	United States	
A Man Called Otto	Marc Forster	Tom Hanks, Mariana Treviño, Rachel Keller, Manuel Garcia-Rulfo	United States	Comedy drama
After Ever Happy	Castillo Landon	Josephine Langford, Hero Fiennes Tiffin	United States, United Kingdom, France	Romantic teen drama
All Quiet on the Western Front	Edward Berger	Daniel Brühl, Albrecht Schuch, Sebastian Hülk	Germany	War drama
Armageddon Time	James Gray	Anne Hathaway, Anthony Hopkins, Jeremy Strong	United States	Period drama
Babylon	Damien Chazelle	Brad Pitt, Margot Robbie	United States	Period drama
Blonde	Andrew Dominik	Ana de Armas, Adrien Brody, Bobby Cannavale, Julianne Nicholson	United States	Biographical drama
Devotion	J. D. Dillard	Jonathan Majors, Glen Powell	United States	War drama
Downton Abbey: A New Era	Simon Curtis	Hugh Bonneville, Elizabeth McGovern, Maggie Smith, Michelle Dockery, Laura Carmichael, Jim Carter, Phyllis Logan	United Kingdom, United States	Historical drama
Elvis	Baz Luhrmann	Austin Butler, Tom Hanks, Olivia DeJonge, Yola, Luke Bracey, Kelvin Harrison Jr., Dacre Montgomery, Helen Thomson, Richard Roxburgh, David Wenham	United States	Biographical, music drama
Empire of Light	Sam Mendes	Olivia Colman, Micheal Ward, Tom Brooke, Tanya Moodie, Hannah Onslow, Crystal Clarke, Toby Jones, Colin Firth	United States	Romantic drama
Hollywood Stargirl	Julia Hart	Grace VanderWaal, Elijah Richardson, Tyrel Jackson Williams, Judy Greer, Judd Hirsch, Uma Thurman	United States	Romantic teen drama
Whitney Houston: I Wanna Dance with Somebody	Kasi Lemmons	Naomi Ackie, Clarke Peters, Tamara Tunie, Nafessa Williams, Stanley Tucci	United States	Biographical, music drama
Laal Singh Chaddha	Advait Chandan	Aamir Khan, Kareena Kapoor, Vijay Sethupathi, Mona Singh	India	Comedy drama
Men	Alex Garland	Jessie Buckley, Rory Kinnear, Paapa Essiedu	United States	Horror drama
Miracle at Manchester	Eddie McClintock	Eddie McClintock, Dean Cain, Daniel Roebuck, Kory Getman	United States	Family drama
Mrs. Harris Goes to Paris	Anthony Fabian	Lesley Manville, Isabelle Huppert, Jason Isaacs, Lambert Wilson, Alba Baptista, Lucas Bravo, Rose Williams	United States, United Kingdom, France, Hungary	Period drama
Prancer: A Christmas Tale	Phil Hawkins	James Cromwell, Darcey Ewart, Sarah-Jane Potts, Aaron McCusker, Joseph Millson	United States	Fantasy drama
Redeeming Love	D.J. Caruso	Abigail Cowen, Tom Lewis, Logan Marshall-Green, Famke Janssen, Ke-Xi Wu	United States	Christian romantic drama
She Said	Maria Schrader	Carey Mulligan, Zoe Kazan	United States	Biographical drama
Sublime	Mariano Biasin		Argentina	coming-of-age, romance
The Fabelmans	Steven Spielberg	Michelle Williams, Paul Dano, Seth Rogen, Gabriel LaBelle	United States	Biographical drama
The Good House	Maya Forbes, Wally Wolodarsky	Sigourney Weaver, Kevin Kline, Morena Baccarin, Rob Delaney, Beverly D'Angelo	United States	Comedy drama
Till	Chinonye Chukwu	Danielle Deadwyler, Jalyn Hall, Frankie Faison, Haley Bennett, Whoopi Goldberg	United States	Biographical drama
Unconformity	Jonathan DiMaio	Jack Mulhern, Alex Oliver	United States	
Where the Crawdads Sing	Olivia Newman	Daisy Edgar-Jones, Taylor John Smith, Harris Dickinson, David Strathairn, Jayson Warner Smith	United States	Suspense thriller, drama
White Bird: A Wonder Story	Marc Forster	Ariella Glaser, Orlando Schwerdt, Bryce Gheisar, Gillian Anderson, Helen Mirren	United States, Germany	War drama
Women Talking	Sarah Polley	Rooney Mara, Claire Foy, Jessie Buckley, Ben Whishaw, Frances McDormand	United States	Drama

== 2023 ==
Title	Director	Cast	Country	Subgenre/notes
A Good Person	Zach Braff	Florence Pugh, Celeste O'Connor, Zoe Lister-Jones, Molly Shannon, Morgan Freeman	United States	Drama
Adalynn	Jacob Byrd	Sydney Carvill, Wade Baker, Janet Carter, Rob Shuster, Suzana Norberg	United States	Horror drama
Are You There God? It's Me, Margaret.	Kelly Fremon Craig	Rachel McAdams, Abby Ryder Fortson, Kathy Bates	United States	Comedy-drama
Blue Hour: The Disappearance of Nick Brandreth	Dan Bowhers	Morgan DeTogne, Michael Kowalski, Mike Headford, Nick Brandreth, Josh Olkowski, Kathryn Schott	United States	Horror drama
Boston Strangler	Matt Ruskin	Keira Knightley, Carrie Coon, Alessandro Nivola, Chris Cooper, David Dastmalchian	United States	Drama
Creed III	Michael B. Jordan	Michael B. Jordan, Tessa Thompson, Phylicia Rashad, Wood Harris, Florian Munteanu, Jonathan Majors	United States	Sports drama
To Fall in Love	Michael Lewis Foster	Beth Gallagher, Eric Casalini, Reese Lily Buell	United States	Drama
Ferrari	Michael Mann	Adam Driver, Penélope Cruz, Shailene Woodley, Gabriel Leone, Sarah Gadon, Jack O'Connell, Patrick Dempsey	United States	Biographical drama
A Little Prayer	Angus MacLachlan	David Strathairn, Jane Levy, Dascha Polanco, Will Pullen, Anna Camp, Celia Weston	United States	
Gran Turismo	Neill Blomkamp	Archie Madekwe, David Harbour, Orlando Bloom	United States	Sports drama
Heart of a Lion	George Tillman Jr.	Khris Davis, Forest Whitaker, Sullivan Jones	United States	Sports biopic
Jacir جاسر	Waheed AlQawasmi	Malek Rahbani, Lorraine Bracco, and Darius "Tutweezy" Tutwiler	United States	Darma
Leader: Amie Bangladesh	Topu Khan	Shakib Khan, Shobnom Bubly, Misha Sawdagor, Shahiduzzaman Selim	Bangladesh	Political drama
Love Again	James C. Strouse	Priyanka Chopra, Sam Heughan, Russell Tovey, Omid Djalili, Celia Imrie, Celine Dion	United States	Romantic drama
Maestro	Bradley Cooper	Bradley Cooper, Carey Mulligan, Jeremy Strong, Matt Bomer, Maya Hawke, Sarah Silverman	United States	Biographical drama
Napoleon	Ridley Scott	Joaquin Phoenix, Vanessa Kirby, Tahar Rahim	United States	Historical drama
Next Goal Wins	Taika Waititi	Michael Fassbender, Elisabeth Moss, Kaimana, Beulah Koale, Rachel House, Uli Latukefu, Rhys Darby, Will Arnett	United States, United Kingdom	Sports dramedy
On a Wing and a Prayer	Sean McNamara	Dennis Quaid, Heather Graham, Jesse Metcalfe, Jessi Case, Rocky Myers	United States	Drama
Oppenheimer	Christopher Nolan	Cillian Murphy, Emily Blunt, Matt Damon, Robert Downey Jr., Florence Pugh, Rami Malek, Benny Safdie	United States	Biographical drama
Priyotoma	Himel Ashraf	Shakib Khan, Idhika Paul, Shahiduzzaman Selim, Lutfur Rahman George, Elina Shammi	Bangladesh	Romantic drama
RC15	S. Shankar	Ram Charan, Anjali, Kiara Advani	India	Political drama
Riley	Benjamin Howard	Jake Holley, Colin McCalla, Riley Quinn Scott, Connor Storrie, Rib Hillis, Caroline Amiguet	United States	Coming of age drama
Shttl	Ady Walter	Moshe Lobel, Saul Rubinek	Ukraine, France	Historical drama
Sisi & I	Frauke Finsterwalder	Susanne Wolff, Sandra Hüller, Stefan Kurt, Tom Rhys Harries, Angela Winkler, Johanna Wokalek	Germany	Biographical drama
The Boys in the Boat	George Clooney	Callum Turner, Joel Edgerton	United States	Sports drama
The Color Purple	Blitz Bazawule	Fantasia Barrino, Colman Domingo, Taraji P. Henson, Corey Hawkins, Danielle Brooks, H.E.R., Halle Bailey, Ciara, Louis Gossett Jr., David Alan Grier, Aunjanue Ellis, Deon Cole, Elizabeth Marvel, Jon Batiste	United States	Musical drama
The Creator	Gareth Edwards	John David Washington, Gemma Chan, Ralph Ineson, Allison Janney, Ken Watanabe	United States	Sci-fi drama
Varisu	Vamshi Paidipally	Vijay, Rashmika Mandanna	India	Drama
When You Finish Saving the World	Jesse Eisenberg	Finn Wolfhard, Julianne Moore, Alisha Boe, Jay O. Sanders, Eleonore Hendricks	United States	Comedy-drama

== 2024 ==
Title	Director	Cast	Country	Subgenre/notes
Bob Marley: One Love	Reinaldo Marcus Green	Kingsley Ben-Adir, Lashana Lynch	United States	Music biopic
Chabuca	Jorge Carmona	Sergio Armasgo, Haydeé Cáceres, Norka Ramirez, Miguel Dávalos, Izan Alcázar, Gina Yangali, Brando Gallessi, Alejandro Villagomez, Gerson Del Carpio, Erick Elera	Peru	Biographical drama
Chaperone	Zoe Eisenberg	Mitzi Akaha, Laird Akeo, Kanoa Goo, Krista Alvarez, Jessica Jade Andres.	United States	
Family Album	Joel Calero	Emanuel Soriano, Camila Ferrer, María Fernanda Valera, Natalia Torres Vilar, Lucho Cáceres, Paulina Tacac, Rocío Limo, Mariano Ramirez, Marcela Duque, Melvin Quijada, Rodrigo Palacios, Katerina D'onofrio	Peru	
I'm Still Here	Walter Salles	Fernanda Torres, Selton Mello, Fernanda Montenegro	Brazil	Historical
Intercontinental	Salomón Pérez	Paris Pesantes, Sol Arbulú, Tania Del Pilar, Joaquín Palomino, Patricia Rodríguez	Peru	
Lee	Ellen Kuras	Kate Winslet, Marion Cotillard, Jude Law, Andrea Riseborough, Josh O'Connor, Andy Samberg	United States	Biographical drama
The Legend of the Last Inca	Tito Catacora	Edwin F. Riva, Maribet Berrocal, Diego Alonzo Aguilar, Amiel Cayo, Fernando Ichuta, Jean L. Jarama Sylvia Majo, Francisco F. Torres, Carlos Victoria, Oscar R. Yepez	Peru	Historical drama
Lost on a Mountain in Maine	Andrew Boodhoo Kightlinger	Luke David Blumm	United States	Adventure drama survival
Mistura	Ricardo de Montreuil	Bárbara Mori, Christian Meier, Cesar Ballumbrosio, Stefano Meier, Juan Pablo Olyslager, Hermelinda Luján, Vanessa Saba, Marco Zunino, Luciana Di Laura, Junior Bejar, Priscila Espinoza	Peru	Historical drama
Ramón and Ramón	Salvador del Solar	Emanuel Soriano, Álvaro Cervantes, Dario Yazbek Bernal, Beto Benites, Carlos Mesta, Jely Reategui, Bruno Odar, Liliana Trujillo, Ebelin Ortiz, Lucho Ramírez, Julián Vargas	Peru, Spain, Uruguay	
Reagan	Sean McNamara	Dennis Quaid, Penelope Ann Miller, Robert Davi, Cary-Hiroyuki Tagawa, Lesley-Anne Down, Jon Voight	United States	Biographical drama
Reinas	Klaudia Reynicke	Abril Gjurinovic, Luana Vega, Jimena Lindo, Gonzalo Molina, Susi Sánchez	Switzerland, Peru, Spain	Coming-of-age drama
Sube a mi nube	Sergio Barrio	Silvana Cañote, Alessa Wichtel, Andrés Wiese, Christian Thorsen, Javier Delgiudice, Emilia Somocurcio, Juan Ignacio Di Marco, Gabriel González, Job Mansilla, Sergio Barrio, Pedro Sessarego, Marialola Arispe, Paco Varela	Peru	
Tattoos in Memory	Luis Llosa	Gianfranco Bustios, Reynaldo Arenas, Milene Vazquez, Renata Flores, Christian Esquivel, Kenyi Nizama, Josué Cohello	Peru	
That Christmas	Simon Otto	Brian Cox, Fiona Shaw, Jodie Whittaker and Bill Nighy (cast leaders)	United Kingdom	CGI-animated Christmas fantasy comedy-drama
Through Rocks and Clouds	Franco García Becerra	Alberth Merma, Nely Huayta, Richard Taipe, José Merma, Deyvis Mayo, Rubén Huillca, Ruperta Condori	Peru, Chile	
Vaguito	Alex Hidalgo	Julián Legaspi, Fernando Arze, Fiorella Rodríguez, Alexia Barnechea, Daniela Darcourt, Erick Del Aguila, Alex Hidalgo, Gina Palma, Américo Zuñiga	Peru	
We Live in Time	John Crowley	Andrew Garfield, Florence Pugh	United States	Comedy-drama
We Strangers	Anu Valia	Kirby Howell-Baptiste, Tina Lifford, Sarah Goldberg, Maria Dizzia, Kara Young, Hari Dhillon, Paul Adelstein, Mischa Reddy	United States	
Young Woman and the Sea	Joachim Rønning	Daisy Ridley, Tilda Cobham-Hervey, Stephen Graham, Christopher Eccleston	United States	Biographical sports drama
Zafari	Mariana Rondón	Daniela Ramírez, Francisco Denis, Samantha Castillo, Varek La Rosa, Alí Rondón, Beto Benites, Claret Quea, Juan Carlos Colombo	Venezuela, Peru, Mexico, France, Chile, Dominican Republic, Brazil	Dystopian black comedy-drama

== 2025 ==
Title	Director	Cast	Country	Subgenre/notes
1982	García JC	Jhordano Álvarez Huarcaya, Kailani Pinedo, Alaín Salinas, Julia Thays, Jesús Colque, Junior Néjar Roca, Alberick García, Dalia Ivanova, Francisco López, Manuel Molina, Atilia Reynaga Calderón, Julio Zúñiga - Chirápag, Sunilda Lima Pachuga	Peru	
Amor Erizo	P.J. Ruiz	Patricia Barreto, Óscar Meza, Cindy Díaz, Alicia Mercado, Monserrat Brugué, Miguel Iza, Naima Luna, Patricia Frayssinet, Cecilia Rechkemmer, Carlos Vertiz	Peru	Romantic comedy-drama
Astronaut	Paul Vega	Daniel Hendler, Angie Cepeda, Salvador del Solar, Gustavo Bueno, Marco Zunino, Fiorella Luna, Miguel Iza, Emilram Cossio, Claudia Berninzon, Bernardo Scarpella	Peru, Colombia, Uruguay	
Downton Abbey: The Grand Finale	Simon Curtis	Hugh Bonneville, Jim Carter, Michelle Dockery, Paul Giamatti, Elizabeth McGovern, Penelope Wilton	United Kingdom, United States	Period drama
If You Should Leave Before Me	Boyd and J. Markus Anderson	Shane P. Allen, John Wilcox Tom Noga, Merrick McCartha, Susan Louise O'Connor	United States	
Magic Hour	Katie Aselton	Katie Aselton, Daveed Diggs, Brad Garrett, Susan Sullivan	United States	
The Mysterious Gaze of the Flamingo	Diego Céspedes	Tamara Cortés, Matías Catalán, Paula Dinamarca, Claudia Cabezas, Luis Dubó	Chile, France, Belgium, Spain, Germany	
Nanito	Guillermo Fernández Cano	Guido Calderón, Martha Rebaza, Roberto Palacios, María Eugenia Málaga, Andrés Luque	Peru	Romantic drama
The Plague	Charlie Poling	Joel Edgerton, Everett Blunck, Kayo Martin, Kenny Rasmussen	United States	Psychological, thriller
Punku	J. D. Fernández Molero	Marcelo Quino, Maritza Kategari, Ricardo Delgado, Hugo Sueldo	Peru, Spain	Supernatural mystery drama
Roofman	Derek Cianfrance	Channing Tatum, Kirsten Dunst, LaKeith Stanfield, Juno Temple, Peter Dinklage	United States	Crime comedy-drama
Sentimental Value	Joachim Trier	Renate Reinsve, Stellan Skarsgård, Inga Ibsdotter Lilleaas, Elle Fanning	Norway	
Sirenas	Nelson “Koko” Castillo	Lucy Bacigalupo, Diva Rivera, Estelita Ochoa, Cielo Lozano, Jasmín Martínez, Luis Rosadio, Dialy Freitas, Kevin Mejía	Peru	Thriller drama
The Smashing Machine	Benny Safdie	Dwayne Johnson, Emily Blunt	United States	Biographical sports drama
To Die For	Daniel Rehder	Juan Carlos Rey de Castro, Ximena Palomino, Mónica Sánchez, Anahí de Cárdenas, Ebelin Ortiz, Denise Dibós, Luana Barron, Adolfo Aguilar, Arianna Fernandez	Peru	Romantic thriller drama
Train Dreams	Clint Bentley	Joel Edgerton, Felicity Jones, Nathaniel Arcand, Clifton Collins Jr., John Diehl, Paul Schneider, Kerry Condon, William H. Macy	United States	Period drama
V13	Richard Ledes	Alan Cumming, Samuel H. Levine, Liam Aiken	United States	Historical drama

== 2026 ==
Title	Director	Cast	Country	Subgenre/notes
Elsinore	Simon Stone	Andrew Scott, Olivia Colman	United Kingdom, United States	Biographical drama
Fjord	Cristian Mungiu	Sebastian Stan, Renate Reinsve, Lisa Carlehed, Ellen Dorrit Petersen, Lisa Loven Kongsli, Henrikke Lund-Olsen	Denmark, Finland, France, Norway, Romania, Sweden	
Hershey	Mark Waters	Finn Wittrock, Alexandra Daddario, Alan Ruck, Richard Kind, David Costabile, Heléne Yorke	United States	Biographical drama
I Play Rocky	Peter Farrelly	Anthony Ippolito, Stephan James, AnnaSophia Robb, Matt Dillon, P. J. Byrne, Toby Kebbell, Tracy Letts, Jay Duplass, Robert Morgan	United States	Biographical drama
Ink	Danny Boyle	Jack O'Connell, Guy Pearce, Claire Foy	United Kingdom, United States	Biographical drama
Michael	Antoine Fuqua	Jaafar Jackson, Nia Long, Juliano Valdi, KeiLyn Durrel Jones, Laura Harrier, Jessica Sula, Mike Myers, Miles Teller, Colman Domingo	United States	Biographical music drama
November 1963	Roland Joffe	John Travolta, Robert Carlyle, Dermot Mulroney, Jefferson White, Mandy Patinkin	United States, Canada	Biographical historical crime drama
Pressure	Anthony Maras	Andrew Scott, Brendan Fraser, Kerry Condon, Chris Messina, Damian Lewis	United Kingdom, France	War drama
Sense and Sensibility	Georgia Oakley	Daisy Edgar-Jones, Esmé Creed-Miles, Caitríona Balfe, Frank Dillane, Herbert Nordrum, Bodhi Rae Breathnach, George MacKay, Fiona Shaw	United Kingdom, United States	Romantic drama
The Social Reckoning	Aaron Sorkin	Mikey Madison, Jeremy Strong, Jeremy Allen White, Bill Burr, Wunmi Mosaku, Billy Magnussen, Betty Gilpin	United States	Biographical drama
Tony	Matt Johnson	Dominic Sessa, Emilia Jones, Dagmara Domińczyk, Rich Sommer, Stavros Halkias, Leo Woodall, Antonio Banderas	United States	Biographical comedy drama
Zero A. D.: The Birth of Christ	Alejandro Monteverde	Deva Cassel, Sam Worthington, Ben Mendelsohn, Gael García Bernal, Jim Caviezel	United States	Epic biblical drama

== 2027 ==
Title	Director	Cast	Country	Subgenre/notes
Alone at Dawn	Ron Howard	Adam Driver, Anne Hathaway, Betty Gilpin, Jon Bass, Rohan Campbell, Sean Kaufman, Devon Bostick, Michael Angelo Covino, Lauren Hutton, Ntare Guma Mbaho Mwine, José Zúñiga	United States	War biopic
Lords of War	Andrew Niccol	Nicolas Cage, Bill Skarsgård, Laura Harrier, Sylvia Hoeks, Greg Tarzan Davis	United States	Crime drama
The Comebacker	Marielle Heller	Tom Hanks	United States	Sports drama
The Nightingale	Michael Morris	Dakota Fanning, Elle Fanning, Edmund Donovan, Shira Haas, Mark Rylance	United States	War drama
The Resurrection of the Christ: Part One	Mel Gibson	Jaakko Ohtonen, Mariela Garriga, Pier Luigi Pasino, Kasia Smutniak, Riccardo Scamarcio, Rupert Everett, Eduardo Scarpetta, Lorenzo Richelmy, Andrea Scarduzio, Marcello Fonte, Lorenzo de Moor, Vincenzo Nemolato, Andrea Misuraca, Patrizio Pelizzi, Marco Pancrazi	United States	Epic biblical drama
The Resurrection of the Christ: Part Two	Mel Gibson	Jaakko Ohtonen, Mariela Garriga, Pier Luigi Pasino, Kasia Smutniak, Riccardo Scamarcio, Rupert Everett, Eduardo Scarpetta, Lorenzo Richelmy, Andrea Scarduzio, Marcello Fonte, Lorenzo de Moor, Vincenzo Nemolato, Andrea Misuraca, Patrizio Pelizzi, Marco Pancrazi	United States	Epic biblical drama
Ti Amo!	Sean Baker		United States	

== Forthcoming ==
Title	Director	Cast	Country	Subgenre/notes
The 99'ers	Nicole Kassell	Zoey Deutch, Emily Bader, Emilia Jones, Alessandro Nivola, Julia McDermott, Shaunette Renée Wilson, Perry Mattfeld, Annabel O'Hagan, Lizzy Greene, Isabelle Fuhrman	United States	Biographical sports drama
Bag Man	Ben Stiller		United States	Biographical political drama
Barbarian Days	Stephen Gaghan		United States	Biographical sports, drama
Born a Crime	Liesl Tommy	Lupita Nyong’o	United States	Biographical drama
Boy21	Peter Ramsey		United States	Teen drama
Calico Joe	George Clooney		United States	Sports drama
Fake!	Scott Z. Burns	Kate Winslet	United States	Biographical drama
Farnsworth House	Richard Press	Ralph Fiennes, Elizabeth Debicki	United States	Period drama
Fever	Todd Haynes	Michelle Williams, Alessandro Nivola	United States	Biographical drama
Follies	Dominic Cooke		United States	Musical drama
Fruit of the Poisonous Tree	Fritz Kiersch	Scott Haze, Willa Fitzgerald, Joel Courtney, Tait Fletcher, Hrvy	United States	True crime, action drama
Fun Home	Sam Gold	Jake Gyllenhaal	United States	Musical biographical dramedy
Houdini	Dan Trachtenberg	Ben Affleck	United States	Biographical drama
Love is Pain	Peter Ramsey		United States	Biographical drama
Michael: King of Pop	Antoine Fuqua	Jaafar Jackson, Nia Long, Juliano Valdi, KeiLyn Durrel Jones, Laura Harrier, Jessica Sula, Mike Myers, Miles Teller, Colman Domingo	United States	Biographical music drama
Nuclear War: A Scenario	Denis Villeneuve		United States	War drama
Scandalous	Colman Domingo	Sydney Sweeney, David Jonsson	United States	Biographical romantic drama
Solitary		Mahershala Ali	United States	Biographical crime drama
The Faith of Long Beach	Eric Amadio	Brandon Perea, Common	United States	Sports drama
The King	Robert Zemeckis	Dwayne Johnson	United States	Biographical drama
Unforgettable	Colman Domingo	Colman Domingo	United States	Biographical music drama
Untitled Bee Gees biopic	Ridley Scott		United States	Music biopic
Untitled Fred Astaire biopic	Paul King	Tom Holland	United States	Musical biopic
White Lies	Oliver Stone	Josh Hartnett, Leila George, Michael Douglas, Willem Dafoe, Ellen Barkin, Homer Gere, Yvonne Chapman, Stephanie Suganami	Italy, Thailand, Bulgaria	
