= 2025 APRECI Awards =

Peruvian film awards

- Date: 6 February 2026
- Site: Teatro Británico, Lima, Peru
- Organized by: Asociación Peruana de Prensa Cinematográfica

Highlights
- Best Picture: Uyariy
- Best Direction: J. D. Fernández Molero; Punku
- Best Actor: Guido Calderón; Nanito
- Best Actress: Julia Thays; 1982
- Most awards: Intercontinental (2)
- Most nominations: Punku (5)

The 2025 APRECI Awards, presented by the Asociación Peruana de Prensa Cinematográfica, took place at the Ministry of Culture in Lima, on 6 February 2026, to recognize the best Peruvian film productions of the year.

The nominations were announced on 17 January 2026.

== Nominees ==
The nominations are listed as follows:

Best Peruvian Feature Film: Uyariy; The Memory of Butterflies; Night Has Come; Punku; Runa Simi	Best Director: J. D. Fernández Molero – Punku; Tatiana Fuentes Sadowski – The Memory of Butterflies; Javier Corcuera – Uyariy; Paolo Tizón – Night Has Come
Best Screenplay: Salomón Pérez – Intercontinental; J. D. Fernández Molero – Punku; Héctor Gálvez & Salvador del Solar – Ramón and Ramón; Eduardo Orcada Villalva – Halfway Down the Street	Best Leading Actor: Guido Calderón – Nanito; Paris Pesantes – Intercontinental; Emanuel Soriano – Ramón and Ramón; Arnold Carlos Styp Torres Rojas – Halfway Down the Street
Best Leading Actress: Julia Thays – 1982; Patricia Barreto – Amor Erizo; Maritza Kategari – Punku; Martha Rebaza – Nanito	Best Supporting Actor: Fernando Bacilio – Halfway Down the Street; Ricardo Delgado – Punku; Lucho Ramírez – Ramón and Ramón; Joshua Salinas – The Innocents
Best Supporting Actress: Tania Del Pilar – Intercontinental; Hermelinda Luján – Mistura; Sylvia Majo – Halfway Down the Street; Grecia Pino – The Innocents	Best Documentary: Night Has Come; The Memory of Butterflies; Runa Simi; Uyariy
Best Short Film: Cuando el cielo vuelva a ser azul; 500 Lucas; Cora; Fever; Todos mis caminos son la destrucción	Best International Premiere: The Secret Agent; It Was Just an Accident; One Battle After Another; A Poet

=== "Armando Robles Godoy" Emeritus Award ===
- Carlos Gassols
