= APRECI Award for Best Screenplay =

Film award

- Awarded for: Best Screenplay for a Peruvian film
- Country: Peru
- Presented by: Asociación Peruana de Prensa Cinematográfica
- Currently held by: Salomón Pérez – Intercontinental (2026)

The APRECI Award for Best Screenplay (Spanish: Premio APRECI a mejor guion) is one of the annual awards given at the APRECI Awards, presented by the Asociación Peruana de Prensa Cinematográfica. It was first presented in 2017 and includes both original and adapted screenplays.

== Winners and nominees ==
=== 2010s ===
Year	English Title	Original Title	Screenwriter(s)	Ref.
2017 (9th)	One Last Afternoon	La última tarde	Joel Calero	
2018 (10th)	Eternity	Wiñaypacha	Óscar Catacora	
2018 (10th)	Django: sangre de mi sangre		Yasmin Bahamonde & Aldo Salvini	
2018 (10th)	Aj Zombies!		Pablo Carrillo, Gonzalo Rodríguez Risco & Bruno Rosina	
2018 (10th)	The Pink House	La casa rosada	Palito Ortega Matute	
2019 (11th)	Retablo		Álvaro Delgado-Aparicio & Héctor Gálvez	
2019 (11th)	The Clash	La bronca	Daniel Vega Vidal & Diego Vega Vidal	
2019 (11th)	Complex Cases	Casos complejos	Omar Forero	

=== 2020s ===
Year	English Title	Original Title	Director(s)	Ref.
2020 (12st)	Powerful Chief	Manco Cápac	Henry Vallejo & Elard Cerruto	
2020 (12st)	The Migration	La migración	Ezequiel Acuña	
2020 (12st)	We're All Sailors	Todos somos marineros	Miguel Angel Moulet	
2021 (13rd)	LXI (61)		Rodrigo Moreno del Valle & Illary Alencastre	
2021 (13rd)	Autoerotic	Autoerótica	Andrea Hoyos	
2021 (13rd)	Song Without a Name	Canción sin nombre	Melina León & Michael J. White	
2022 (14th)	Willaq Pirqa, the Cinema of My Village	Willaq Pirqa, el cine de mi pueblo	César Galindo, Augusto Cabada & Gastón Vizcarra	
2022 (14th)	Indigenous' Slayer	Mataindios	Oscar Sánchez Saldaña & Robert Julca Motta	
2022 (14th)	Moon Heart	El corazón de la luna	Aldo Salvini	
2022 (14th)	The Shape of Things to Come	Tiempos futuros	Victor Manuel Checa	
2023 (15th)	Yana-Wara		Óscar Catacora	
2023 (15th)	The Monroy Affaire	El caso Monroy	Josué Méndez	
2023 (15th)	Shipibos Stories	Historias de shipibos	Omar Forero	
2023 (15th)	The Last Laugh	Muerto de risa	Gonzalo Ladines	
2024 (16th)	Motherland	Kinra	Marco Panatonic	
2024 (16th)	The Legend of the Last Inca	Los indomables	Óscar Catacora	
2024 (16th)	Alone Together	Compartespacios	Carmen Rojas Gamarra	
2024 (16th)	Reinas		Klaudia Reynicke & Diego Vega	
2025 (17th)	Intercontinental		Salomón Pérez	
2025 (17th)	Punku		J. D. Fernández Molero	
2025 (17th)	Ramón and Ramón	Ramón y Ramón	Héctor Gálvez & Salvador del Solar	
2025 (17th)	Halfway Down the Street	A media calle	Eduardo Orcada Villalva	
