= 2024 APRECI Awards =

Peruvian film awards

- Date: 8 February 2025
- Site: Teatro Británico, Lima, Peru
- Organized by: Asociación Peruana de Prensa Cinematográfica

Highlights
- Best Picture: Motherland
- Best Direction: Marco Panatonic; Motherland
- Best Actor: Gonzalo Molina; Reinas
- Best Actress: Tania Del Pilar; Alone Together
- Most awards: Motherland (4)
- Most nominations: Motherland (6)

The 2024 APRECI Awards, presented by the Asociación Peruana de Prensa Cinematográfica, was held at the Teatro Británico in Lima on 8 February 2025 to recognize the best Peruvian film productions of the year.

The nominations were announced on 14 January 2025.

== Nominees ==
The nominations are listed as follows:

Best Peruvian Feature Film: Motherland; Alone Together; The Bastard Images; El Huaro; Reinas	Best Director: Marco Panatonic – Motherland; Daniel Rodríguez Risco – Quadrilateral; Klaudia Reynicke – Reinas; Omar Forero – The Uncle Lino
Best Screenplay: Marco Panatonic – Motherland; Carmen Rojas Gamarra – Alone Together; Klaudia Reynicke & Diego Vega – Reinas; Óscar Catacora – The Legend of the Last Inca	Best Leading Actor: Gonzalo Molina – Reinas; Emanuel Soriano – Family Album; Raúl Challa Casquina – Motherland; Sergio Armasgo – Chabuca
Best Leading Actress: Tania Del Pilar – Alone Together; Maribet Berrocal – The Legend of the Last Inca; Saor Sax – Fuga; Silvana Cañote – Sube a mi nube	Best Supporting Actor: Yuri Choa Tunquipa – Motherland; Diego Bertie – The Inheritance of Flora; Lucho Cáceres – Family Album; Miguel Dávalos – Chabuca
Best Supporting Actress: Jimena Lindo – Reinas; Daniela Trucíos – Alone Together; Lizbeth Cabrera – Motherland; Susi Sánchez – Reinas	Best Documentary: The Bastard Images; El Huaro; The Uncle Lino; Prodigal Daughter
Best Short Film: The Assistant; Becoming Rosa; I Wish I Could Tell the Truth; Sheep and Wolves; Puquio	Best International Premiere: All We Imagine as Light; Juror No. 2; The Substance; The Zone of Interest

=== "Armando Robles Godoy" Emeritus Award ===
- Delfina Paredes
