= APRECI Award for Best Peruvian Feature Film =

Film award

- Awarded for: Best Peruvian Feature Film of the Year
- Country: Peru
- Presented by: Asociación Peruana de Prensa Cinematográfica
- Currently held by: Uyariy (2026)

The APRECI Award for Best Peruvian Feature Film (Spanish: Premio APRECI a la mejor película peruana) is one of the awards given by the Asociación Peruana de Prensa Cinematográfica in recognition of those outstanding Peruvian feature films of the previous year. The category was awarded for the first time in 2009 to Claudia Llosa's drama film The Milk of Sorrow.

The current Peruvian production that holds the award is the Javier Corcuera's documentary film Uyariy in the seventeenth award, with the winners announced on February 6, 2026.

== Winners and nominees ==
=== 2000s ===
Year	English Title	Original Title	Director(s)	Ref.
2009 (1st)	The Milk of Sorrow	La teta asustada	Claudia Llosa	

=== 2010s ===
Year	English Title	Original Title	Director(s)	Ref.
2010 (2nd)	Paradise	Paraíso	Héctor Gálvez	
2011 (3st)	The Bad Intentions	Las malas intenciones	Rosario García-Montero	
2012 (4th)	Chicama		Omar Forero	
2013 (5th)	The Space Between Things	El espacio entre las cosas	Raul del Busto	
2014 (6th)	El mudo		Daniel Vega Vidal & Diego Vega Vidal	
2015 (7th)	NN	NN: Sin identidad	Héctor Gálvez	
2016 (8th)	Videophilia (and Other Viral Syndromes)	Videofilia (y otros síndromes virales)	Juan Daniel F. Molero	
2017 (9th)	Rosa Chumbe		Jonatan Relayze	
2018 (10th)	Eternity	Wiñaypacha	Óscar Catacora	
2018 (10th)	Django: sangre de mi sangre		Aldo Salvini	
2018 (10th)	Don't Call Me Spinster	No me digas solterona	Ani Alva Helfer	
2018 (10th)	The Pink House	La casa rosada	Palito Ortega Matute	
2018 (10th)	Southern Winds	Vientos del sur	Franco García Becerra	
2019 (11th)	Retablo		Álvaro Delgado-Aparicio	
2019 (11th)	The Clash	La bronca	Daniel Vega Vidal & Diego Vega Vidal	
2019 (11th)	Complex Cases	Casos complejos	Omar Forero	
2019 (11th)	The Revolution and the Land	La revolución y la tierra	Gonzalo Benavente Secco	
2019 (11th)	What Couples Do	Los helechos - Enredos de parejas	Antolín Prieto	

=== 2020s ===
Year	English Title	Original Title	Director(s)	Ref.
2020 (12th)	Powerful Chief	Manco Cápac	Henry Vallejo	
2020 (12th)	Time and Silence	El tiempo y el silencio	Alonso Izaguirre	
2020 (12th)	We're All Sailors	Todos somos marineros	Miguel Angel Moulet	
2021 (13th)	Song Without a Name	Canción sin nombre	Melina León	
2021 (13th)	About Everything There Is to Know	De todas las cosas que se han de saber	Sofia Velázquez	
2021 (13th)	Autoerotic	Autoerótica	Andrea Hoyos	
2021 (13th)	The Best Families	Las mejores familias	Javier Fuentes-León	
2021 (13th)	LXI (61)		Rodrigo Moreno del Valle	
2022 (14th)	Willaq Pirqa, the Cinema of My Village	Willaq Pirqa, el cine de mi pueblo	César Galindo	
2022 (14th)	Indigenous' Slayer	Mataindios	Oscar Sánchez Saldaña & Robert Julca Motta	
2022 (14th)	Moon Heart	El corazón de la luna	Aldo Salvini	
2022 (14th)	The Shape of Things to Come	Tiempos futuros	Victor Manuel Checa	
2023 (15th)	Yana-Wara		Óscar Catacora & Tito Catacora	
2023 (15th)	Diógenes		Leonardo Barbuy La Torre	
2023 (15th)	The Monroy Affaire	El caso Monroy	Josué Méndez	
2023 (15th)	Open-Pit	Cielo abierto	Felipe Esparza Pérez	
2023 (15th)	Shipibos Stories	Historias de shipibos	Omar Forero	
2024 (16th)	Motherland	Kinra	Marco Panatonic	
2024 (16th)	Alone Together	Compartespacios	Carmen Rojas Gamarra	
2024 (16th)	The Bastard Images	El archivo bastardo	Marianela Vega	
2024 (16th)	El huaro		Patricia Wiesse Risso	
2024 (16th)	Reinas		Klaudia Reynicke	
2025 (17th)	Uyariy		Javier Corcuera	
2025 (17th)	The Memory of Butterflies	La memoria de las mariposas	Tatiana Fuentes Sadowski	
2025 (17th)	Night Has Come	Vino la noche	Paolo Tizón	
2025 (17th)	Punku		J. D. Fernández Molero	
2025 (17th)	Runa Simi		Augusto Zegarra	
