= Motherland (2023 Peruvian film) =

- Theatrical release poster
- Quechua: Kinra
- Directed by: Marco Panatonic
- Written by: Marco Panatonic
- Produced by: Walter Manrique; Gladis Florez; Maykon Lope
- Starring: Raul Challa Casquina
- Cinematography: Alberto Flores; Pierre Pastor
- Edited by: Fabiola Sialer Cuevas
- Music by: Fragancias de Chumbivilcas; Dina Yallerco
- Production company: Films Bastardía
- Distributed by: V&R Films
- Release dates: November 6, 2023 (Mar del Plata); November 14, 2024 (Peru)
- Running time: 157 minutes
- Country: Peru
- Languages: Quechua; Spanish

Motherland (whose original title is Kinra; it was later retitled as Kinra, el viaje de Atoqcha, lit. 'Kinra, the journey of Atoqcha') is a 2023 Peruvian drama film written and directed by Marco Panatonic, in his directorial debut. It follows a man from Cusco who dreams to become an engineer, but doesn't want to leave his mother and sister.

The film had its world premiere at the 38th Mar del Plata International Film Festival on 6 November 2023, where it won the Golden Astor. It was theatrically released in Peru on 14 November 2024 by V&R Films. It was also selected as the Peruvian entry for the Best International Feature Film at the 98th Academy Awards, but it was not nominated.

== Synopsis ==
Atoqcha travels between his home in the mountains where his mother lives and the city of Cusco, looking for a place to live and work, seeking a future as a civil engineering student. Along his journey, he will find a friend who will welcome him like family. However, he cannot forget his mother or his sister, who is also searching for her own path, or the land where he grew up. Going back is his way, despite starting anew, because his heart will always be divided, just like his country.

== Cast ==
The actors participating in this film are:

- Raul Challa Casquina as Atoqcha
- Yuri Choa Tunquipa as Richar
- Tomasa Sivincha Huamani as Atoqcha's mother
- Marcosa Huamani Gonzales as Mamagrande
- Jorge Gonzales as Atoqcha's father
- Lizbeth Cabrera as Atoqcha's sister
- Aurelio Quispe Cusihuaman as Julian
- Dorotea Noa Ch’ecca as Richar's mother
- Soledad Secca Noa as Richar's sister
- Celso Aro Quispe as Engineer

== Production ==
The first version of the script was completed in 2014, then in 2017 the film received an economic stimulus of 420,000 soles from the Audiovisual, Phonography and New Media Directorate delivered by the Ministry of Culture of Peru in the category of "Fiction Feature Film Projects in Native Languages". It was recorded over a period of 2 years in Chumbivilcas in Cusco, Peru.

== Release ==
Motherland had its world premiere on November 6, 2023, at the 38th Mar del Plata International Film Festival, then screened on March 28, 2024, at the Carnegie Mellon International Film Festival, on April 14, 2024, at the 12th Montreal Latin American Film Festival, on August 12, 2024, at the 28th Lima Film Festival, and on November 16, 2024, at the Cali International Film Festival. It was commercially released on November 14, 2024, in Peruvian theaters.

== Accolades ==
Year	Award / Festival	Category	Recipient	Result	Ref.
2023	38th Mar del Plata International Film Festival	Golden Astor	Motherland	Won	
2024	28th Lima Film Festival	Best Picture	Motherland	Nominated	
2024	28th Lima Film Festival	Best Debut Film	Motherland	Won	
2024	28th Lima Film Festival	International Critics' Jury Award for Best Film	Motherland	Won	
2024	28th Lima Film Festival	Ministry of Culture Jury Award for Best Peruvian Film	Motherland	Won	
2024	28th Lima Film Festival	CINETRAB Award for Best Fiction	Motherland	Won	
2024	28th Lima Film Festival	APRECI Award for Best Film in Competition	Motherland	Won	
2025	16th APRECI Awards	Best Peruvian Feature Film	Motherland	Won	
2025	16th APRECI Awards	Best Director	Marco Panatonic	Won	
2025	16th APRECI Awards	Best Screenplay	Marco Panatonic	Won	
2025	16th APRECI Awards	Best Leading Actor	Raúl Challa Casquin	Nominated	
2025	16th APRECI Awards	Best Supporting Actress	Lizbeth Cabrera	Nominated	
2025	16th APRECI Awards	Best Supporting Actor	Yuri Choa Tunquipa	Won	

== See also ==
- List of submissions to the 98th Academy Awards for Best International Feature Film
- List of Peruvian submissions for the Academy Award for Best International Feature Film
