= APRECI Award for Best Director =

Film award

- Awarded for: Best Director for a Peruvian film
- Country: Peru
- Presented by: Asociación Peruana de Prensa Cinematográfica
- Currently held by: J. D. Fernández Molero – Punku (2026)

The APRECI Award for Best Director (Spanish: Premio APRECI a mejor director) is one of the annual awards given at the APRECI Awards, presented by the Asociación Peruana de Prensa Cinematográfica. It was first presented in 2022.

== Winners and nominees ==
=== 2020s ===
Year	Director	English title	Original title	Ref.
2022 (14th)	César Galindo	Willaq Pirqa, the Cinema of My Village	Willaq Pirqa, el cine de mi pueblo	
2022 (14th)	Tito Catacora	Pakucha		
2022 (14th)	Aldo Salvini	Moon Heart	El corazón de la luna	
2022 (14th)	Oscar Sánchez Saldaña & Robert Julca Motta	Indigenous' Slayer	Mataindios	
2023 (15th)	Óscar Catacora & Tito Catacora	Yana-Wara		
2023 (15th)	Felipe Esparza	Open-Pit	Cielo abierto	
2023 (15th)	Omar Forero	Shipibos Stories	Historias de shipibos	
2023 (15th)	Josué Méndez	The Monroy Affaire	El caso Monroy	
2024 (16th)	Marco Panatonic	Motherland	Kinra	
2024 (16th)	Omar Forero	The Uncle Lino	El tío Lino	
2024 (16th)	Klaudia Reynicke	Reinas		
2024 (16th)	Daniel Rodríguez Risco	Quadrilateral	Cuadrilátero	
2025 (17th)	J. D. Fernández Molero	Punku		
2025 (17th)	Javier Corcuera	Uyariy		
2025 (17th)	Tatiana Fuentes Sadowski	The Memory of Butterflies	La memoria de las mariposas	
2025 (17th)	Paolo Tizón	Night Has Come	Vino la noche	
