= APRECI Award for Best Actress =

Film award

- Awarded for: Best Actress for a Peruvian film
- Country: Peru
- Presented by: Asociación Peruana de Prensa Cinematográfica
- Currently held by: Julia Thays – 1982 (2026)

The APRECI Award for Best Actress (Spanish: Premio APRECI a mejor actriz) is one of the annual awards given at the APRECI Awards, presented by the Asociación Peruana de Prensa Cinematográfica. It was first presented in 2017.

== Winners and nominees ==
=== 2010s ===
Year	Actress	Role(s)	English title	Original title	Ref.
2017 (9th)	Liliana Trujillo	Rosa Chumbe	Rosa Chumbe		
2018 (10th)	Patricia Barreto	Patricia	Don't Call Me Spinster	No me digas solterona	
2018 (10th)	Rosa Nina	Phaxsi	Eternity	Wiñaypacha	
2018 (10th)	Carolina Niño de Guzmán		Southern Winds	Vientos del sur	
2018 (10th)	Gisela Ponce de León	María Fé	How to Get Over a Breakup	Soltera codiciada	
2019 (11th)	Núria Frigola	Iris	What Couples Do	Los helechos	
2019 (11th)	Anahí de Cárdenas	Claudia	Aj Zombies!		
2019 (11th)	Pamela Mendoza	Georgina	Song Without a Name	Canción sin nombre	

=== 2020s ===
Year	Actress	Role(s)	English title	Original title	Ref.
2020 (12th)	Attilia Boschetti	Rosa	The Restoration	La restauración	
2020 (12th)	Paulina Bazán	Sofía	The Migration	La migración	
2020 (12th)	Diana Collazos		Time and Silence	El tiempo y el silencio	
2021 (13th)	Rafaella Mey	Bruna	Autoerotic	Autoerótica	
2021 (13th)	Tatiana Astengo	Luzmila	The Best Families	Las mejores familias	
2021 (13th)	Mayella Lloclla	Vilma	A World for Julius	Un mundo para Julius	
2022 (14th)	Haydeé Cáceres	M	Moon Heart	El corazón de la luna	
2022 (14th)	Valquiria Huerta	Camila	Long Distance	Larga distancia	
2022 (14th)	Mayella Lloclla	Amelia	La decisión de Amelia		
2022 (14th)	Antonia Moreno	Antonia	Antonia	Antonia en la vida	
2023 (15th)	Sylvia Majo	Matilde	Reinaldo Cutipa		
2023 (15th)	Tatiana Astengo	Norma	Redemption	Redención	
2023 (15th)	Luz Diana Mamani	Yana-Wara	Yana-Wara		
2023 (15th)	Gisela Yupa	Sabina	Diógenes		
2024 (16th)	Tania Del Pilar	Isabel	Alone Together	Compartespacios	
2024 (16th)	Maribet Berrocal	Gregoria Apaza	The Legend of the Last Inca	Los indomables	
2024 (16th)	Silvana Cañote	Mónica Santa María	Sube a mi nube		
2024 (16th)	Saor Sax	Saor	Fuga		
2025 (17th)	Julia Thays	Mercedes	1982		
2025 (17th)	Patricia Barreto	Alicia	Amor Erizo		
2025 (17th)	Maritza Kategari	Meshia	Punku		
2025 (17th)	Martha Rebaza	Antonia	Nanito		
