= Intercontinental (film) =

- Promotional release poster
- Directed by: Salomón Pérez
- Written by: Salomón Pérez
- Produced by: Carolina Denegri
- Starring: Paris Pesantes
- Cinematography: Christian Valera
- Edited by: Clara Jost
- Music by: Renzo Mada
- Production companies: Animalita; Domitor
- Release date: October 26, 2024 (Kyiv IFF Molodist)
- Running time: 92 minutes
- Country: Peru
- Language: Spanish

Intercontinental is a 2024 Peruvian semi-autobiographical drama film written and directed by Salomón Pérez. It stars Paris Pesantes as a filmmaker who returns to his native Trujillo at a complicated family and personal time.

== Synopsis ==
Ismael, a filmmaker who returns to his hometown of Trujillo after years in Switzerland, faces uncertainty and loneliness as he seeks to rebuild his identity.

== Cast ==
- Paris Pesantes
- Sol Arbulú
- Tania Del Pilar
- Joaquín Palomino
- Patricia Rodríguez

== Release ==
The film had its world premiere on October 26, 2024, at the 53rd Kyiv International Film Festival "Molodist", then it was screened on August 11, 2025, at the 29th Lima Film Festival.

== Accolades ==
Award / Festival	Date of ceremony	Category	Recipient(s)	Result	Ref.
Lima Film Festival	16 August 2025	Peruvian Competition - Best Film	Intercontinental	Nominated	
APRECI Awards	6 February 2026	Best Leading Actor	Paris Pesantes	Nominated	
APRECI Awards	6 February 2026	Best Supporting Actress	Tania Del Pilar	Won	
APRECI Awards	6 February 2026	Best Screenplay	Salomón Pérez	Won	
