= Reinas (film) =

2024 film by Klaudia Reynicke

- International release poster
- Directed by: Klaudia Reynicke
- Written by: Klaudia Reynicke; Diego Vega
- Produced by: Britta Rindelaub; Thomas Reichlin; Daniel Vega; Valérie Delpierre
- Starring: Abril Gjurinovic; Luana Vega; Jimena Lindo; Gonzalo Molina; Susi Sánchez
- Cinematography: Diego Romero
- Edited by: Paola Freddi; Francesco de Matteis
- Music by: Klaudia Reynicke; Gioacchino Balistreri
- Production companies: Alva Film; Maretazo Cine; Inicia Films
- Release dates: 22 January 2024 (Sundance); 22 August 2024 (Peru); 6 September 2024 (Spain)
- Running time: 104 minutes
- Countries: Switzerland; Peru; Spain
- Language: Spanish
- Box office: $54,220

Reinas, released internationally as Queens, is a 2024 coming-of-age drama film directed by Klaudia Reynicke from a screenplay she co-wrote with Diego Vega which stars Abril Gjurinovic, Luana Vega, Jimena Lindo, Gonzalo Molina, and Susi Sánchez. It is a Swiss-Peruvian-Spanish international co-production. The film was selected as the Swiss entry for the Best International Feature Film at the 97th Academy Awards, but was not nominated.

== Premise ==
In 1990s Peru, two teenage sisters are about to leave their country when they unexpectedly reconnect with an absent father. This relationship will both amplify and ease their pain of change.

== Cast ==
- Abril Gjurinovic as Lucía
- Luana Vega as Aurora
- Jimena Lindo as Elena
- Gonzalo Molina as Carlos
- Alejandro Aramburu as Rony
- Susi Sánchez

== Production ==
Principal photography began on January 31, 2023, and wrapped on March 14, 2023, in Peru.

== Release ==
The film premiered in the World Cinema Dramatic Competition at the 2024 Sundance Film Festival on January 22, 2024, then screened on February 17, 2024, in the Generation 14plus section at the 74th Berlin International Film Festival. It was commercially released on August 22, 2024, in Peruvian theaters and on September 6, 2024, in Spanish theaters.

== Reception ==
=== Critical response ===
Reinas has an approval rating of 86% on review aggregator website Rotten Tomatoes, based on 29 reviews, and an average rating of 7.2/10.

=== Accolades ===
Award	Date	Category	Recipient	Result	Ref.
Actors and Actresses Union Awards	10 March 2025	Best Actress in an International Production	Susi Sánchez	Nominated	
APRECI Awards	8 February 2025	Best Peruvian Feature Film	Reinas	Nominated	
APRECI Awards	8 February 2025	Best Director	Klaudia Reynicke	Nominated	
APRECI Awards	8 February 2025	Best Screenplay	Klaudia Reynicke & Diego Vega	Nominated	
APRECI Awards	8 February 2025	Best Supporting Actress	Jimena Lindo	Won	
APRECI Awards	8 February 2025	Best Supporting Actress	Susi Sánchez	Nominated	
APRECI Awards	8 February 2025	Best Leading Actor	Gonzalo Molina	Won	
Satellite Awards	26 January 2025	Best Foreign Language Film	Reinas	Nominated	
Sundance Film Festival	28 January 2024	World Cinema Grand Jury Prize: Dramatic	Reinas	Nominated	
Berlin International Film Festival	25 February 2024	Grand Prix for Best Film in Generation Kplus	Reinas	Won	
Lima Film Festival	17 August 2024	Best Picture	Reinas	Nominated	
Lima Film Festival	17 August 2024	Best Screenplay	Reinas	Won	
Locarno Film Festival	17 August 2024	Prix du Public UBS	Reinas	Won	

== See also ==
- List of Spanish films of 2024
- List of submissions to the 97th Academy Awards for Best International Feature Film
- List of Swiss submissions for the Academy Award for Best International Feature Film
