= The Memory of Butterflies =

2025 Peruvian documentary film

- Teaser poster
- Spanish: La memoria de las mariposas
- Directed by: Tatiana Fuentes Sadowski
- Written by: Tatiana Fuentes Sadowski
- Produced by: Lali Madueño Medina; co - producer Ico Costa
- Cinematography: Tatiana Fuentes Sadowski; Lali Madueño Medina
- Edited by: Tatiana Fuentes Sadowski; Fernanda Bonilla; Elizabeth Landesberg
- Production companies: Miti Films; Perpetua Cine; Oublaum Films
- Release date: 16 February 2025 (Berlinale)
- Running time: 77 minutes
- Countries: Peru; Portugal
- Language: Spanish

The Memory of Butterflies (Spanish: La memoria de las mariposas) is a 2025 documentary film written, co-produced and directed by Tatiana Fuentes Sadowski in her directorial debut. The film documents the lost stories of Omarino and Aredomi emerging from the shadows of the rubber trade. It is a journey through Amazonian archives that connects research, speculation and the filmmaker’s own family history.

The film was selected in Forum at the 75th Berlin International Film Festival, where it had first screening on 16 February 2025.

== Summary ==
In a single photograph, Omarino and Aredomi come to life, their histories fading away with the rubber boom. This image prompts a deep dive into my ancestral connections to the rubber industry. Their stories weave together in The Memory of Butterflies, a personal journey blending reality with dreams, history with imagination. This transcendent voyage explores the interrelationships of power, memory, responsibility, and legacy, all set within the remnants of days gone by.

== Production ==
The film was made with the help of funds received from The Institute of Cinema and Audiovisual, Portugal, DAFO – Peru Cinema Institute, Ford Foundation, and Tambo Films.

== Release ==
The Memory of Butterflies had its world premiere in the Forum section of the 75th Berlin International Film Festival on 16 February 2025.

It competed in Latin American Documentary at the 29th Lima Film Festival for Trophy Spondylus in August 2025.

It will be presented in 'Mission Life - 2025' section of the 56th International Film Festival of India in November 2025.

== Accolades ==
Award	Date	Category	Recipient	Result	Ref.
Berlin International Film Festival	23 February 2025	Berlinale Documentary Film Award Special Mention	Tatiana Fuentes Sadowski	Special Mention	
Berlin International Film Festival	23 February 2025	FIPRESCI Prize	The Memory of Butterflies	Won	
Lima Film Festival	16 September 2025	Ministry of Culture Jury Award for Best Peruvian Film	The Memory of Butterflies	Won	
APRECI Awards	6 February 2026	Best Peruvian Feature Film	The Memory of Butterflies	Nominated	
APRECI Awards	6 February 2026	Best Director	Tatiana Fuentes Sadowski	Nominated	
APRECI Awards	6 February 2026	Best Documentary	The Memory of Butterflies	Nominated	
