= 2019 APRECI Awards =

Peruvian film awards

- Date: 20 February 2020
- Site: Ministry of Culture, Lima, Peru
- Organized by: Asociación Peruana de Prensa Cinematográfica

Highlights
- Best Picture: Retablo
- Best Actor: Rodrigo Palacios; The Clash
- Best Actress: Núria Frigola; What Couples Do
- Most awards: Retablo (3)
- Most nominations: Retablo & The Clash (5 each)

The 2019 APRECI Awards, presented by the Asociación Peruana de Prensa Cinematográfica, took place at the Ministry of Culture in Lima, on 20 February 2020, to recognize the best Peruvian film productions of the year.

The nominations were announced on 5 February 2020.

== Winners and nominees ==
The winners and nominees are listed as follows:

Best Peruvian Feature Film: Retablo; Complex Cases; What Couples Do; The Clash; The Revolution and the Land	Best Screenplay: Álvaro Delgado-Aparicio & Héctor Gálvez – Retablo; Omar Forero – Complex Cases; Daniel Vega & Diego Vega – The Clash
Best Leading Actor: Rodrigo Palacios – The Clash; Gianfranco Brero – Norte; Jorge Guerra – The Clash; Júnior Béjar – Retablo	Best Leading Actress: Núria Frigola – What Couples Do; Anahí de Cárdenas – Aj Zombies!; Pamela Mendoza – Song Without a Name
Best Supporting Actor: Rodrigo Sánchez Patiño – The Clash; Amiel Cayo – Retablo; Héctor Paredes – Complex Cases; Miguel Iza – Aj Zombies!	Best Supporting Actress: Magaly Solier – Retablo; Isabelle Guérard – The Clash; Máfer Gutiérrez – What Couples Do
Best Documentary: The Revolution and the Land; The Journey of Javier Heraud; Seeing Again	Best International Premiere: The Irishman; Marriage Story; Once Upon a Time in Hollywood; Pain and Glory
