= The Space Between Things =

- Theatrical release poster
- Spanish: El espacio entre las cosas
- Directed by: Raul del Busto
- Written by: Raul del Busto
- Cinematography: Raúl del Busto; Cynthia Inamine
- Edited by: Raul del Busto; Cyntia Inamine
- Music by: Port-Royal; Ed Porth; Meloman
- Production company: Intro Films
- Release date: September 19, 2013 (Peru)
- Running time: 90 minutes
- Country: Peru
- Language: Spanish
- Box office: $8.463

The Space Between Things (Spanish: El espacio entre las cosas) is a 2013 Peruvian experimental fantasy drama film written and directed by Raul del Busto.

== Synopsis ==
A director prepares a new film, a policeman. The main character is a detective who goes by the name of Glauber Maldonado. Mysterious events changed the life of the detective and that of the director in a diffuse journey between reality and hallucination.

== Cast ==
The actors participating in this film are:

- Natalia Pena
- Fernando Escribens
- Ricardo Sandi
- Fernando Vilchez
- Ryowa Uehara

== Release ==
=== Distribution ===
The film won the National Contest of Projects of Distribution of Feature Film awarded by the Ministry of Culture in 2012.

=== Theatrical release ===
The film was commercially released on September 19, 2013, in Peruvian theaters.

=== Controversy ===
A day and a half after the premiere, the functions of the Cineplanet Alcazar cinema chain scheduled for Friday, Saturday and Sunday were suddenly canceled due to "emergency maintenance" (a similar situation happened with The Bad Intentions). Those responsible for the film, Raul del Busto and Cyntia Inamine, expressed their discomfort and discontent with the cinema chain, and also proclaimed that they would denounce Cineplanet for an attempted boycott.

5 days later, the Peruvian Association of Cinematographic Press (APRECI) proclaimed itself against Cineplanet and invoking the authorities to enforce the law.

== Awards ==
Year	Award	Category	Recipient	Result	Ref.
2013	Independent Lima Film Festival	Special Mention of the Jury	The Space Between Things	Won	
2013	APRECI Awards	Best Peruvian Feature Film	The Space Between Things	Won	
2013	Luces Awards	Best Film	The Space Between Things	Nominated	
