= Night Has Come (film) =

- Peruvian theatrical release poster
- Spanish: Vino la noche
- Directed by: Paolo Tizón
- Written by: Paolo Tizón
- Produced by: Diana Castro; Paolo Tizón
- Cinematography: Paolo Tizón
- Edited by: Paolo Tizón; Martín Solá
- Production companies: Cinesol Films; Elías Querejeta Zine Eskola; PCM Post; Tupay Cine
- Distributed by: Pai Films (Peru)
- Release dates: 30 June 2024 (KVIFF); 13 November 2025 (Peru)
- Running time: 96 minutes
- Countries: Peru; Spain; Mexico
- Language: Spanish

Night Has Come (Spanish: Vino la noche) is a 2024 documentary film written, co-produced, filmed, co-edited and directed by Paolo Tizón, in his directorial debut. It follows a group of young men who enlist in the Peruvian Air Force, dreaming of becoming "men of war" and eager to fight in VRAEM. It is a co-production between Peru, Spain and Mexico.

The film had its world premiere in the Proxima section of the 58th Karlovy Vary International Film Festival on 30 June 2024. It was theatrically released in Peru by Pai Films on 13 November 2025.

It was also selected as the Peruvian entry for Best International Feature Film at the 99th Academy Awards and for the Best Ibero-American Film at the 41st Goya Awards.

== Cast ==
- Larry Morales
- Terry Ramos
- Jhordy Febre
- Luis Huaman
- Wanderley Yauri
- Britman Machari
- Hulber Ahuanari

== Release ==
The film premiered worldwide on 30 June 2024, at the 58th Karlovy Vary International Film Festival, then screened in October at the 22nd Morelia International Film Festival. It was also screened on 4 March 2025 at the 24th MoMA Doc Fortnight, on 21 March at the 28th Málaga Film Festival, on 25 March at the 37th Latin American Film Festival of Toulouse, and on 8 August at the 29th Lima Film Festival.

It was commercially released on 13 November 2025, in Peruvian theaters.

== Accolades ==
Award / Festival	Date of ceremony	Category	Recipient(s)	Result	Ref.
Karlovy Vary International Film Festival	6 July 2024	PROXIMA Grand Prix	Night Has Come	Nominated	
Karlovy Vary International Film Festival	6 July 2024	PROXIMA Special Jury Prize	Night Has Come	Won	
Karlovy Vary International Film Festival	6 July 2024	FIPRESCI Award for PROXIMA Competition	Night Has Come	Won	
Málaga Film Festival	23 March 2025	Best Direction	Paolo Tizón	Won	
Lima Film Festival	16 August 2025	Trophy Spondylus for Best Documentary	Night Has Come	Nominated	
APRECI Awards	6 February 2026	Best Peruvian Feature Film	Night Has Come	Nominated	
APRECI Awards	6 February 2026	Best Director	Paolo Tizón	Nominated	
APRECI Awards	6 February 2026	Best Documentary	Night Has Come	Won	
Luces Awards	23 April 2026	Best Film	Night Has Come	Nominated	

== See also ==
- List of submissions to the 99th Academy Awards for Best International Feature Film
- List of Peruvian submissions for the Academy Award for Best International Feature Film
