= Alone Together (2023 film) =

- Promotional release poster
- Spanish: Compartespacios
- Directed by: Carmen Rojas Gamarra
- Written by: Carmen Rojas Gamarra
- Produced by: Morella Moret
- Starring: Tania Del Pilar
- Cinematography: Yalfrelys Farreras
- Edited by: Yuraqyana
- Music by: Emilia Fernández
- Production company: Yuraqyana
- Release date: October 11, 2023 (FICV)
- Running time: 75 minutes
- Country: Peru
- Language: Spanish

Alone Together (Spanish: Compartespacios, lit. 'Sharespaces') is a 2023 Peruvian drama film written and directed by Carmen Rojas Gamarra in her directorial debut. The film stars Tania Del Pilar as a shy, anxious and depressed thirty-year-old woman who searches for her place in the world with the help of her friend and her friend's boyfriend.

== Synopsis ==
Isabel returns to Lima accompanied by her anxiety and depression. Her friend Paula takes her in and helps her get out of her comfort zone. When Pedro, Paula's new boyfriend, appears in her life, she feels a special connection with him, which leads her to question many things.

== Cast ==
- Tania Del Pilar as Isabel
- Daniela Trucíos as Paula
- Daniel Cano as Pedro

== Production ==
Principal photography began on August 9, 2021, and ended in early September of the same year in Peru.

== Release ==
It had its world premiere on October 11, 2023, at the 30th Valdivia International Film Festival, then screened on March 21, 2024, at the 42nd International Film Festival of Uruguay, on April 18, 2024, at the 25th Buenos Aires International Festival of Independent Cinema and at the 12th Montreal Latin American Film Festival, on June 18, 2024, at the 2nd Peruvian Film Festival in Madrid, on August 11, 2024, at the 28th Lima Film Festival, October 17, 2024, at the 11th Trujillo Film Festival, and November 10, 2024, at the 10th University of Lima Film Week.

== Accolades ==
Year	Award / Festival	Category	Recipient	Result	Ref.
2024	28th Lima Film Festival	Peruvian Competition - Best Film	Alone Together	Nominated	
2024	11th Trujillo Film Festival	Best Fiction Feature Film	Alone Together	Won	
2024	11th Huánuco Film Festival	Best Released Fiction Feature Film	Alone Together	Nominated	
2025	16th APRECI Awards	Best Peruvian Feature Film	Alone Together	Nominated	
2025	16th APRECI Awards	Best Screenplay	Carmen Rojas Gamarra	Nominated	
2025	16th APRECI Awards	Best Leading Actress	Tania Del Pilar	Won	
2025	16th APRECI Awards	Best Supporting Actress	Daniela Trucíos	Nominated	
