= 2023 APRECI Awards =

Peruvian film awards

- Date: 23 February 2024
- Site: Ministry of Culture, Lima, Peru
- Organized by: Asociación Peruana de Prensa Cinematográfica

Highlights
- Best Picture: Yana-Wara
- Best Direction: Óscar Catacora & Tito Catacora; Yana-Wara
- Best Actor: Damián Alcázar; The Monroy Affaire
- Best Actress: Sylvia Majo; Reinaldo Cutipa
- Most awards: Yana-Wara (3)
- Most nominations: The Monroy Affaire (6)

The 2023 APRECI Awards, presented by the Asociación Peruana de Prensa Cinematográfica, took place at the Ministry of Culture in Lima, on 23 February 2024, to recognize the best Peruvian film productions of the year.

The nominations were announced on 6 February 2024. A new non competitive award that honors personalities with an outstanding trajectory in Peruvian cinematography was introduced for the first time. The first honoree was Nora de Izcue, the first Peruvian female filmmaker.

== Winners and nominees ==
The winners and nominees are listed as follows:

Best Peruvian Feature Film: Yana-Wara; Diógenes; The Monroy Affaire; Open-Pit; Shipibos Stories	Best Director: Óscar Catacora & Tito Catacora – Yana-Wara; Felipe Esparza – Open-Pit; Omar Forero – Shipibos Stories; Josué Méndez – The Monroy Affaire
Best Screenplay: Óscar Catacora – Yana-Wara; Omar Forero – Shipibos Stories; Gonzalo Ladines – The Last Laugh; Josué Méndez – The Monroy Affaire	Best Leading Actor: Damián Alcázar – The Monroy Affaire; Jesús Luque Colque – Reinaldo Cutipa; Cecilio Quispe – Yana-Wara; César Ritter – The Last Laugh
Best Leading Actress: Sylvia Majo – Reinaldo Cutipa; Tatiana Astengo – Redemption; Luz Diana Mamani – Yana-Wara; Gisela Yupa – Diógenes	Best Supporting Actor: Andry Azán – Shipibos Stories; Gianfranco Brero – The Last Laugh; Salvador del Solar — How to Deal With a Heartbreak; Luis Márquez – Shipibos Stories
Best Supporting Actress: María Luque — The Most Feared Skin; Michele Abascal — The Erection of Toribio Bardelli; Liliana Trujillo – The Monroy Affaire; Wendy Vásquez – The Monroy Affaire	Best Documentary: Grompes, Curumi and The Papaya Girl; Amazon Sound; Classroom 8; Deep Red
Best International Premiere: Fallen Leaves; Killers of the Flower Moon; Oppenheimer; Pictures of Ghosts

=== APRECI Emeritus Award ===
- Nora de Izcue
