= 1982 (2025 film) =

- Promotional release poster
- Directed by: García JC
- Written by: García JC
- Produced by: Paul Córdova; Eliana Illescas; García JC
- Starring: Jhordano Álvarez Huarcaya
- Cinematography: Marco Arauco
- Edited by: Zachary Ayotte
- Music by: Gabriel Dufour-Laperrièrre
- Production company: Chaska Films
- Release date: August 11, 2025 (Lima)
- Running time: 84 minutes
- Country: Peru
- Language: Spanish

1982 is a 2025 Peruvian drama film written, co-produced and directed by García JC in his directorial debut. It stars Jhordano Álvarez Huarcaya as a 12-year-old boy whose life changes when his father is accused of being a terrorist.

== Cast ==
- Jhordano Álvarez Huarcaya as Tato
- Kailani Pinedo as Carola
- Alaín Salinas as Juan
- Julia Thays as Mercedes
- Jesús Colque as Teodoro
- Junior Néjar Roca as Pulincho
- Alberick García as Cesar
- Dalia Ivanova as Emilia
- Francisco López as Suplicio
- Manuel Molina as Palomino
- Atilia Reynaga Calderón as Pacheco
- Julio Zúñiga - Chirápaq as Claudio
- Sunilda Lima Pachuga as Foly
- Máximo Guisado as Victor
- Aurora Torrín Silvera as Catalina
- Jhosuel Yauris Cabezas as Coco
- Hans Alendez Collao as Nataco
- Adriano Quintana Ramos as Ulico
- Giordano Oscco Vasquez as Rudy
- Johnny Quispe Laura as Antucha
- Amiel Cayo as Director
- Ciro Monzón Lara as Guido
- Sebastian Rubio as Fernando
- Briscila Degregori as Verónica
- Yesica Espinosa as Ernestina
- Rosa Reynaga Calderón as Bread Saleswoman
- Juan Carlos Cespedes as Lucho

== Release ==
The film premiered worldwide on August 11, 2025, at the 29th Lima Film Festival as part of the Peruvian Competition, then screened on October 26, 2025, at the 44th Abitibi-Témiscamingue International Film Festival, and on November 14, 2025, at the 12th Trujillo Film Festival.

== Reception ==
=== Critical reception ===
Giancarlo F. Ciprian from Cinencuentro highlights how the film portrays the protagonist's inner journey and the abrupt end of his childhood, successfully conveying melancholy and emotion. However, he considers the treatment of violence and the historical context superficial, as it simplifies more complex conflicts and offers a flat view of the situation.

=== Accolades ===
Award / Festival	Date of ceremony	Category	Recipient(s)	Result	Ref.
Lima Film Festival	16 August 2025	Peruvian Competition - Best Film	1982	Nominated	
Lima Film Festival	16 August 2025	PUCP Community Award for Made in Peru Best Film	1982	Won	
APRECI Awards	6 February 2026	Best Leading Actress	Julia Thays	Won	
