= Grompes, Curumi and the Papaya Girl =

Grompes, Curumi and The Papaya Girl
- Promotional release poster
- Directed by: Fernando Valdivia
- Written by: Fernando Valdivia
- Produced by: Tania Medina; Evan Killick
- Narrated by: Fernando Valdivia
- Cinematography: Fernando Valdivia
- Edited by: Fernando Valdivia
- Production company: Teleandes Producciones
- Release date: October 19, 2023 (FECIT)
- Running time: 82 minutes
- Country: Peru
- Language: Spanish

Grompes, Curumi and The Papaya Girl (Spanish: Grompes, Curumí y la niña de la papaya) is a 2023 Peruvian documentary film written, edited, narrated, filmed and directed by Fernando Valdivia. It follows the 1997 expedition to Purús in search of "The Papaya girl", the protagonist of the 1986 photo by photographer Lily Saldaña that became popular in newspapers, magazines and calendars.

== Synopsis ==
After 25 years, ancient images that intertwine the lives of a lost indigenous girl, an old Huni Kuin healer and a Chitonahua native who abandoned the nomadic life return to the distant jungles of Purús. The past returns to confront a present in which they continue fighting to survive in the midst of isolation and marginalization, where the forest is their main ally.

== Cast ==
- Grompes Puricho
- Clara Belisario Nascimento
- Amrnado Puricho
- Margarita Puricho
- Segundina Puricho
- Roberto Puricho

== Release ==
It had its world premiere on October 19, 2023, at the 10th Trujillo Film Festival, on November 13, 2023, at the 9th University of Lima Film Week, and on January 14, 2024, at the 10th Censurados Film Festival.

== Accolades ==
Year	Award / Festival	Category	Recipient	Result	Ref.
2023	10th Trujillo Film Festival	Best Documentary Feature Film	Grompes, Curumi and The Papaya Girl	Nominated	
2023	9th University of Lima Film Week	Honorable Mention	Grompes, Curumi and The Papaya Girl	Won	
2024	14th APRECI Awards	Best Documentary	Grompes, Curumi and The Papaya Girl	Won	
