= Open-Pit =

- Promotional release poster
- Spanish: Cielo abierto
- Directed by: Felipe Esparza Pérez
- Written by: Felipe Esparza Pérez
- Produced by: Felipe Esparza Pérez; Victoria Arias; Lorena Tulini
- Cinematography: Fernando Criollo
- Edited by: Kendra McLaughlin; Felipe Esparza Pérez
- Music by: Nantu Studio
- Production companies: Milk Studio; PAI Films; BULLA
- Release date: January 26, 2023 (IFFR)
- Running time: 65 minutes
- Countries: Peru; France
- Language: Spanish

Open-Pit (Spanish: Cielo abierto) is a 2023 Peruvian-French experimental docudrama film directed, written, co-produced and co-edited by Felipe Esparza Pérez in his directorial debut. It is about a father and son separated by the death of the wife/mother whose paths will cross again.

== Synopsis ==
A Peruvian father labours patiently, chipping at the white volcanic stone that forms an extraordinary landscape. His son is part of the modern world: he uses cameras and drones in order to create the digital model of a church on a computer. Separated by the mysterious death of the wife/mother figure in the family, these men do not connect. And yet their paths cross in a ghostly manner, as do their professions: each in their own way works with textures and volumes, sensations and perceptions.

== Cast ==
- Dionicio Huaraccallo Idme
- Moisés Jiménez Carbajal
- Julio Carcausto Larito
- Mayra Ferrer

== Release ==
Open-Pit had its world premiere on January 26, 2023, at the 52nd International Film Festival Rotterdam as part of the Bright Future section, then screened on April 22, 2023, at the 45th Moscow International Film Festival, on August 17, 2023, at the 27th Lima Film Festival, on September 2, 2023, at the Cinemancia Metropolitan Film Festival, on October 6, 2023, at the 52nd Festival du nouveau cinéma and on November 26, 2023, at the 41st Torino Film Festival.

== Accolades ==
Year	Award / Festival	Category	Recipient	Result	Ref.
2023	27th Lima Film Festival	Made in Peru - Audience Award	Open-Pit	Nominated	
2023	27th Lima Film Festival	Ministry of Culture Jury Award for Best Peruvian Film	Open-Pit	Won	
2023	27th Lima Film Festival	CINETRAB Award for Best Fiction	Open-Pit	Won	
2023	52nd Festival du nouveau cinéma	New Alchemists Prize - Honorable Mention	Open-Pit	Won	
2023	10th Huánuco Film Festival	Best Peruvian Fiction Feature Film	Open-Pit	Won	
2023	41st Torino Film Festival	Best International Documentary Film	Open-Pit	Nominated	
2024	15th APRECI Awards	Best Peruvian Feature Film	Open-Pit	Nominated	
2024	15th APRECI Awards	Best Director	Felipe Esparza Pérez	Nominated	
