= 2017 APRECI Awards =

Peruvian film awards

- Date: 2 February 2018
- Site: National Library of Peru, Lima, Peru
- Organized by: Asociación Peruana de Prensa Cinematográfica

Highlights
- Best Picture: Rosa Chumbe
- Best Actor: Lucho Cáceres; One Last Afternoon
- Best Actress: Liliana Trujillo; Rosa Chumbe
- Most awards: Rosa Chumbe (3)

The 2017 APRECI Awards, presented by the Asociación Peruana de Prensa Cinematográfica, took place at the National Library of Peru in Lima, on 2 February 2018, to recognize the best Peruvian film productions of the year.

== Winners ==
The winners are listed as follows:

Best Peruvian Feature Film: Rosa Chumbe	Best Screenplay: Joel Calero – One Last Afternoon
Best Leading Actor: Lucho Cáceres – One Last Afternoon	Best Leading Actress: Liliana Trujillo – Rosa Chumbe
Best Supporting Actor: Ramón García Monteagudo – The Light on the Hill	Best Supporting Actress: Cindy Díaz – Rosa Chumbe
Best International Premiere: Toni Erdmann
