= Time and Silence =

- Promotional release poster
- Spanish: El tiempo y el silencio
- Directed by: Alonso Izaguirre
- Written by: Alonso Izaguirre
- Produced by: Luis Basurto; Adriana Milla
- Cinematography: Luis Basurto
- Edited by: Christiand Lu
- Production companies: Badu Producciones; Alfalfa Producciones; Espacio y Tiempo Asociación Cultural
- Release date: September 2, 2020 (Frontera Sur)
- Running time: 79 minutes
- Country: Peru
- Language: Spanish

Time and Silence (Spanish: El tiempo y el silencio, lit. 'The time and the silence') is a 2020 Peruvian independent drama film written and directed by Alonso Izaguirre in his directorial debut.

== Synopsis ==
A man teaches a workshop on "In Search of Lost Time" by Marcel Proust. Under the excessiveness of the project, failure is looming. However, after meeting a woman, he decides to share his time with her between the silence and the passing of the days.

== Cast ==
- Manuel Siles
- Diana Collazos
- Oswaldo Salas
- Oscar Ludeña
- Ichi Terukina
- Ricardo Velásquez
- Jaydda Díaz

== Release ==
Time and Silence had its world premiere on 2 September 2020, at the 3rd Frontera Sur International Non-Fiction Film Festival, then it was screened on 18 September 2020, at the 1st Lima Alterna International Film Festival and on 11 October 2021, at the 8th Trujillo Film Festival.

== Accolades ==
| Year | Award / Festival | Category | Recipient | Result | Ref. |
|---|---|---|---|---|---|
| 2021 | 12th APRECI Awards | Best Peruvian Feature Film | Time and Silence | Nominated | |
| 2021 | 12th APRECI Awards | Best Actress | Diana Collazos | Nominated | |
| 2021 | 8th Trujillo Film Festival | Best Fiction Film | Time and Silence | Nominated | |
