= Neighborhood Cinemas =

- Promotional release poster
- Directed by: Wari Gálvez Rivas
- Written by: Wari Gálvez Rivas
- Produced by: Wari Gálvez Rivas
- Cinematography: Jorge Terrazos Javier; Jorge Cerna
- Edited by: Cristian Jayos Chávez; Wari Gálvez Rivas
- Production company: Películas El Traumatropo
- Release date: September 26, 2020 (Al Este)
- Running time: 100 minutes
- Country: Peru
- Language: Spanish

Neighborhood Cinemas (Spanish: Cines de video, lit. 'Video cinemas') is a 2020 Peruvian documentary film written, produced, co-edited and directed by Wari Gálvez Rivas. It presents experiences of operators, ticket takers and administrators linked to the old cinemas of Peru.

== Synopsis ==
A group of operators prepare the projection of a movie in which they themselves are the protagonists: former operators, ticket takers and administrators will reveal experiences linked to the old cinemas across Peru.

== Release ==
Neighborhood Cinemas had its world premiere on September 26, 2020, at the 11th Al Este Film Festival.

== Accolades ==
Year	Award	Category	Recipient	Result	Ref.
2021	12th APRECI Awards	Best Documentary	Neighborhood Cinemas	Nominated	
