= 2020 APRECI Awards =

Peruvian film awards

- Date: 31 March 2021
- Organized by: Asociación Peruana de Prensa Cinematográfica

Highlights
- Best Picture: Powerful Chief
- Best Actor: Jesús Luque Colque; Powerful Chief
- Best Actress: Attilia Boschetti; The Restoration
- Most awards: Powerful Chief (3)
- Most nominations: We're All Sailors (4)

The 2020 APRECI Awards, presented by the Asociación Peruana de Prensa Cinematográfica, took place virtually on 31 March 2021, to recognize the best Peruvian film productions of the year.

The nominations were announced on 18 March 2021.

== Winners and nominees ==
The winners and nominees are listed as follows:

Best Peruvian Feature Film: Powerful Chief; Time and Silence; We're All Sailors	Best Screenplay: Henry Vallejo & Elard Cerruto – Powerful Chief; Ezequiel Acuña – The Migration; Miguel Angel Moulet – We're All Sailors
Best Leading Actor: Jesús Luque Colque – Powerful Chief; Amiel Cayo – Samichay, In Search of Happiness; Alejandro Vargas Vilela – We're All Sailors	Best Leading Actress: Attilia Boschetti – The Restoration; Paulina Bazán – The Migration; Diana Collazos – Time and Silence
Best Supporting Actress: Delfina Paredes – The Restoration & Julia Thays – We're All Sailors	Best Documentary: Círculo de tiza; Neighborhood Cinemas; Supa Layme
Best International Premiere: Mank; Never Rarely Sometimes Always; One in a Thousand
