= APRECI Award for Best Documentary =

Film award

- Awarded for: Best Documentary of the Year
- Country: Peru
- Presented by: Asociación Peruana de Prensa Cinematográfica
- Currently held by: Night Has Come (2026)

The APRECI Award for Best Documentary (Spanish: Premio APRECI al mejor documental) is one of the annual awards given at the APRECI Awards, presented by the Asociación Peruana de Prensa Cinematográfica. It was first presented in 2019.

== Winners and nominees ==
=== 2010s ===
Year	English title	Original title	Director	Ref.
2019 (11th)	The Revolution and the Land	La revolución y la tierra	Gonzalo Benavente Secco	
2019 (11th)	The Journey of Javier Heraud	El viaje de Javier Heraud	Javier Corcuera	
2019 (11th)	Seeing Again	Volver a ver	Judith Vélez	

=== 2020s ===
Year	English title	Original title	Director	Ref.
2020 (12th)	Circle of Chalk	Círculo de tiza	Jean Alcócer & Diana Daf Collazos	
2020 (12th)	Neighborhood Cinemas	Cines de video	Wari Gálvez Rivas	
2020 (12th)	Supa Layme		Fumito Fujikawa	
2021 (13th)	About Everything There Is to Know	De todas las cosas que se han de saber	Sofía Velázquez Núñez	
2021 (13th)	Hatun Phaqcha, The Healing Land	Hatun Phaqcha, Tierra Sana	Delia Ackerman	
2021 (13th)	I'll Wait Until They Call My Name	Esperaré aquí hasta oír mi nombre	Héctor Gálvez	
2021 (13th)	Perpetual Person	Persona perpetua	Javier Bellido	
2021 (13th)	There Is No Way Back Home	No hay regreso a casa	Yaela Gottlieb	
2022 (14th)	Pakucha		Tito Catacora	
2022 (14th)	The Captives	Las cautivas	Natalia Maysundo	
2022 (14th)	Mirlo's Dance	La danza de los Mirlos	Álvaro Luque	
2022 (14th)	Steel Life	Vida férrea	Manuel Bauer	
2023 (15th)	Grompes, Curumi and The Papaya Girl	Grompes, Curumí y la niña de la papaya	Fernando Valdivia	
2023 (15th)	Amazon Sound	Sonido amazónico	Luis Chumbe Huamani	
2023 (15th)	Classroom 8	Aula 8	Héctor Gálvez	
2023 (15th)	Deep Red	Rojo profundo	Maga Zevallos	
2024 (16th)	The Bastard Images	El archivo bastardo	Marianela Vega	
2024 (16th)	El Huaro		Patricia Wiesse Risso	
2024 (16th)	Prodigal Daughter	Hija Pródiga	Mabel Valdiviezo	
2024 (16th)	The Uncle Lino	El tío Lino	Omar Forero	
2025 (17th)	Night Has Come	Vino la noche	Paolo Tizón	
2025 (17th)	The Memory of Butterflies	La memoria de las mariposas	Tatiana Fuentes Sadowski	
2025 (17th)	Runa Simi		Augusto Zegarra	
2025 (17th)	Uyariy		Javier Corcuera	
