= 2021 APRECI Awards =

Peruvian film awards

- Date: 11 March 2022
- Site: Ministry of Culture, Lima, Peru
- Organized by: Asociación Peruana de Prensa Cinematográfica

Highlights
- Best Picture: Song Without a Name
- Best Actor: Tommy Párraga; Song Without a Name
- Best Actress: Rafaella Mey; Autoerotic
- Most awards: LXI (61) (3)
- Most nominations: LXI (61) (5)

The 2021 APRECI Awards, presented by the Asociación Peruana de Prensa Cinematográfica, took place at the Ministry of Culture in Lima, on 11 March 2022, to recognize the best Peruvian film productions of the year.

The nominations were announced on 26 February 2022.

== Winners and nominees ==
The winners and nominees are listed as follows:

Best Peruvian Feature Film: Song Without a Name; About Everything There Is to Know; Autoerotic; LXI (61); The Best Families	Best Screenplay: Rodrigo Moreno del Valle & Illary Alencastre – LXI (61); Andrea Hoyos – Autoerotic; Melina León & Michael J. White – Song Without a Name
Best Leading Actor: Tommy Párraga – Song Without a Name; Luis Ramírez – El viaje macho	Best Leading Actress: Rafaella Mey – Autoerotic; Tatiana Astengo – The Best Families; Mayella Lloclla – A World for Julius
Best Supporting Actor: Rodrigo Palacios – LXI (61); Sebastián Rubio – LXI (61)	Best Supporting Actress: Cynthia Moreno – LXI (61); Grapa Paola – The Best Families; Sonia Seminario – The Best Families; Wendy Vásquez – Autoerotic
Best Documentary: About Everything There Is to Know; Hatun Phaqcha, The Healing Land; I'll Wait Until They Call My Name; Perpetual Person; There Is No Way Back Home	Best International Premiere: Annette; Petite Maman; The Last Duel; The Power of the Dog
