= The Revolution and the Land =

- Theatrical release poster
- Spanish: La revolución y la tierra
- Directed by: Gonzalo Benavente Secco
- Written by: Gonzalo Benavente Secco; Grecia Barbieri
- Produced by: Carolina Denegri
- Cinematography: Elard Robles
- Edited by: Chino Pinto
- Music by: Santiago Pillado-Matheu
- Production companies: Animalita; Autocinema Films; Bebeto Films
- Release date: October 10, 2019 (Peru)
- Running time: 110 minutes
- Country: Peru
- Language: Spanish

The Revolution and the Land (Spanish: La revolución y la tierra) is a 2019 Peruvian documentary film directed by Gonzalo Benavente Secco and written by Secco & Grecia Barbieri. The film is about the 1969 agrarian reform carried out by the left-reformist military dictatorship, calling itself the "Revolutionary Government of the Armed Forces".

== Synopsis ==
On June 24, 1969, the Revolutionary Government of the Armed Forces promulgated Decree Law No. 17716 for agrarian reform throughout the Peruvian territory. The revolution and the land is an analysis of the background, facts and consequences of this law.

The documentary was made based on interviews with historians and protagonists of the agrarian reform undertaken by the regime of General Juan Velasco Alvarado.

== Production ==
=== Financing ===
The Revolution and the Land was the winning project of the National Documentary Feature Film Contest of the Ministry of Culture (DAFO 2016).

=== Filming ===
It was recorded at the Huando farm, the La Brea y Pariñas oil complex in Talara (Piura) and the photography studio of Martín Chambi. It was also recorded in La Convención (Cuzco)

== Release ==
=== First release ===
The film had its premiere in the documentary film competition at the 23rd Lima Film Festival, in August 2019. It premiered on October 10, 2019, in Peruvian theaters.

=== Second release ===
Due to the COVID-19 pandemic in Peru and in memory of the celebration of National Dignity Day, the documentary was re-released on October 9, 2020, through the video hosting platform Vimeo. A percentage of the collection was destined to help indigenous peoples in their fight against COVID-19 in the Amazon.

== Reception ==
During its first week of release, it attracted 18,000 viewers. In the last week of October 2019, it exceeded 38,000 viewers, breaking the record of being the most watched Peruvian documentary in theaters in the national territory. Later it surpassed the sale of 50,000 tickets, and finally attracted 90,000 viewers, becoming the most watched Peruvian documentary.

== Controversy ==
According to journalistic sources, the National Institute of Radio and Television scheduled the broadcast of the documentary for Sunday, April 4 on TV Peru, one day before the commemoration of Fujimori's self-coup, and one week before the 2021 general elections. Through social networks, the production invited voters to watch the documentary and thus decide their vote, which was seen as proselytizing by certain conservative sectors, as former Defense Minister Pedro Cateriano commented on his Twitter profile. Days later, the state body decided to change the date to April 18, which was criticized by the producer of the documentary and was described as an attempt at censorship. Peruvian directors Marcela Cossios and Marina León added to the criticism for the reprogramming, as well as the candidate for the presidency Verónika Mendoza of the Together for Perú party. The time change caused the documentary to be massively pirated and shared. do for viewing through YouTube or Facebook, causing a Streisand effect.

== Awards ==
Year	Award	Category	Recipient	Result	Ref.
2019	23rd Lima Film Festival	Best Peruvian Film - Jury Mention	The Revolution and the Land	Won	
2020	11th APRECI Awards	Best Peruvian Feature Film	The Revolution and the Land	Nominated	
2020	11th APRECI Awards	Best Documentary	The Revolution and the Land	Won	
