= Punku =

- Promotional release poster
- Directed by: J. D. Fernández Molero
- Written by: J. D. Fernández Molero
- Produced by: Verónica Ccarhuarupay; J. D. Fernández Molero
- Starring: Marcelo Quino; Maritza Kategari; Ricardo Delgado; Hugo Sueldo
- Cinematography: Tenmy Johan Carrasco Monzon
- Edited by: J. D. Fernández Molero
- Music by: Carlos Gutiérrez Quiroga
- Production companies: Tiempo Libre; Jur Jur Producciones
- Release date: February 15, 2025 (Berlinale)
- Running time: 132 minutes
- Countries: Peru; Spain
- Languages: Spanish; Quechua; Machiguenga

Punku is a 2025 supernatural mystery drama film written, produced, edited and directed by J. D. Fernández Molero. A co-production between Peru and Spain, the film follows a boy who had mysteriously disappeared, but is found injured by a Machiguenga teenager in the jungle.

== Synopsis ==
Deep in the Peruvian Amazon, Meshia, an indigenous Machiguenga teenager, discovers Iván, a boy who disappeared two years ago and was presumed dead. Determined to save him, she embarks on a journey upriver into the mountains, heading for the village of Quillabamba. Despite Iván's silence, a strange bond grows between them. But when a stranger with sinister intentions emerges, their inner worlds—and their fragile connection—are put at risk.

== Cast ==
- Marcelo Quino
- Maritza Kategari as Meshia
- Ricardo Delgado
- Hugo Sueldo

== Production ==
The film took eight years to complete: four years of filming in Quillabamba, Cusco, and the rest in post-production.

== Release ==
Punku had its world premiere on February 15, 2025, in the Forum section at the 75th Berlin International Film Festival, then screened on April 2, 2025, at the 64th Cartagena Film Festival and July 19, 2025 at 25th New Horizons Film Festival in Wrocław.

== Accolades ==
| Year | Award / Festival | Category | Recipient | Result | Ref. |
|---|---|---|---|---|---|
| 2025 | 75th Berlin International Film Festival | FIPRESCI Prize - Forum | Punku | Nominated | |
| 2025 | 25th New Horizons Film Festival in Wrocław | Grand Prix | Punku | Won | |
| 2025 | 43rd Uruguay International Film Festival | Best Film - International Feature Film Competition | Punku | Nominated | |
| 2025 | 43rd Uruguay International Film Festival | Youth Jury Award - Special Mention | Punku | Won | |
| 2025 | 29th Lima Film Festival | Trophy Spondylus | Punku | Nominated | |
| 2025 | 29th Lima Film Festival | Best Cinematography - Special Mention | Johan Carrasco | Won | |
| 2025 | 64th Cartagena Film Festival | Best Cinematography - Iberoamerican Section | Johan Carrasco | Won | |
| 2026 | APRECI Awards | Best Peruvian Feature Film | Punku | Nominated | |
| 2026 | APRECI Awards | Best Director | J. D. Fernández Molero | Won | |
| 2026 | APRECI Awards | Best Leading Actress | Maritza Kategari | Nominated | |
| 2026 | APRECI Awards | Best Supporting Actor | Ricardo Delgado | Nominated | |
| 2026 | APRECI Awards | Best Screenplay | J. D. Fernández Molero | Nominated | |
