= About Everything There Is to Know =

- Promotional release poster
- Spanish: De todas las cosas que se han de saber
- Directed by: Sofía Velásquez Núñez
- Written by: Sofía Velásquez Núñez
- Produced by: Carolina Denegri Sánchez
- Cinematography: Carlos Sánchez Giraldo
- Edited by: Sofía Velásquez Núñez
- Music by: Renato Rodríguez; Filiberto Barrios
- Production company: Mercado Central
- Release date: November 2021 (Lima)
- Running time: 91 minutes
- Country: Peru
- Language: Spanish

About Everything There Is to Know (Spanish: De todas las cosas que se han de saber) is a 2021 Peruvian documentary film written, edited and directed by Sofía Velásquez Núñez.

== Synopsis ==
A group of filmmakers arrives in Santiago de Chuco, birthplace of the poet César Vallejo. With the excuse of a casting, the filmmakers occupy the main theater and the local inhabitants arrive, gradually revealing their lives embraced by the poet's aura. All of them, residents and filmmakers, get confused between verses, stories and poetry.

== Release ==
About Everything There Is to Know had its world premiere in mid-November 2021 at the 7th University of Lima Film Week then screened on November 22, 2021, at the 36th Mar del Plata International Film Festival and on March 24, 2022, at the 25th Málaga Film Festival.

== Accolades ==
| Year | Award / Festival | Category | Recipient | Result | Ref. |
|---|---|---|---|---|---|
| 2021 | 7th University of Lima Film Week | National Feature Film Competition | About Everything There Is to Know | Won | |
| 2021 | 36th Mar del Plata International Film Festival | Latin American Competition Award | About Everything There Is to Know | Nominated | |
| 2021 | 36th Mar del Plata International Film Festival | Latin American Competition - Special Mention | About Everything There Is to Know | Won | |
| 2022 | 13th APRECI Awards | Best Peruvian Feature Film | About Everything There Is to Know | Nominated | |
| 2022 | 13th APRECI Awards | Best Documentary | About Everything There Is to Know | Won | |
| 2022 | 18th Luces Awards | Best Film | About Everything There Is to Know | Nominated | |
| 2022 | 25th Málaga Film Festival | Silver Biznaga for Best Documentary | About Everything There Is to Know | Nominated | |
