= 2018 APRECI Awards =

Peruvian film awards

- Date: 1 February 2019
- Site: Ministry of Culture, Lima, Peru
- Organized by: Asociación Peruana de Prensa Cinematográfica

Highlights
- Best Picture: Eternity
- Best Actor: Miguel Iza; Caiga quien caiga
- Best Actress: Patricia Barreto; Don't Call Me Spinster
- Most awards: Eternity (3)
- Most nominations: Eternity (4)

The 2018 APRECI Awards, presented by the Asociación Peruana de Prensa Cinematográfica, took place at the Ministry of Culture in Lima, on 1 February 2019, to recognize the best Peruvian film productions of the year.

The nominations were announced on 22 January 2019.

== Winners and nominees ==
The winners and nominees are listed as follows:

Best Peruvian Feature Film: Eternity; Django: Sangre de mi sangre; Don't Call Me Spinster; The Pink House; Southern Winds	Best Screenplay: Óscar Catacora – Eternity; Yasmin Bahamonde & Aldo Salvini – Django: Sangre de mi sangre; Pablo Carrillo, Gonzalo Rodríguez Risco & Bruno Rosina – Aj Zombies!; Palito Ortega Matute – The Pink House
Best Leading Actor: Miguel Iza – Caiga quien caiga & Vicente Catacora – Eternity; José Luis Adrianzen – The Pink House; Giovanni Ciccia – Django: Sangre de mi sangre	Best Leading Actress: Patricia Barreto – Don't Call Me Spinster; Rosa Nina – Eternity; Carolina Niño de Guzmán – Southern Winds; Gisela Ponce de León – How to Get Over a Breakup
Best Supporting Actor: Emanuel Soriano – Django: Sangre de mi sangre; Oscar Alarcón – Complex Cases; Carlos Cano – The Pink House; Javier Valdés – El Abuelo	Best Supporting Actress: Camila Mac Lennan – The Pink House & Stephanie Orúe – Django: Sangre de mi sangre; Anahí de Cárdenas – Don't Call Me Spinster, Aj Zombies! & ¡Asu mare! 3; Hermelinda Luján – Southern Winds
Best International Premiere: Phantom Thread & Roma; Hereditary; The Square; The House by the Sea; Zama
