= Classroom 8 =

- Promotional release poster
- Directed by: Héctor Gálvez
- Written by: Héctor Gálvez
- Produced by: Héctor Gálvez
- Starring: Victor Zapata Farro
- Cinematography: Héctor Gálvez
- Edited by: Héctor Gálvez
- Music by: Jorge Pablo Tantavilca
- Release date: August 12, 2023 (Lima)
- Running time: 54 minutes
- Country: Peru
- Language: Spanish

Classroom 8 (Spanish: Aula 8) is a 2023 Peruvian documentary film written, produced, filmed, edited and directed by Héctor Gálvez. It follows a school teacher Víctor Zapata Farro and his way of educating his students in the midst of the COVID-19 pandemic.

== Synopsis ==
In 2021, from his modest apartment, a professor teaches virtual classes seeking to reflect with his young low-income students on racism, politics, and inequality – themes that resonate in an increasingly fractured country.

== Cast ==
- Víctor Zapata Farro

== Release ==
Classroom 8 had its world premiere on August 12, 2023, at the 27th Lima Film Festival, then had different screenings around the country: on October 14, 2023, at the Sala Oquendo de Amat of the House of Peruvian Literature, and the April 18, 2024, in Iquitos.

== Accolades ==
Year	Award / Festival	Category	Recipient	Result	Ref.
2023	27th Lima Film Festival	Best Documentary	Classroom 8	Nominated	
2024	15th APRECI Awards	Best Documentary	Classroom 8	Nominated	
