= Don't Go to School Tomorrow =

2021 Mexican drama film

No vayas a clase mañana
- Theatrical release poster
- Directed by: Diego Barragan
- Written by: Diego Barragan
- Produced by: Alex Barragan; Jacopo Fontana; Miranda Guzman; Fernando Montes de Oca; Tereza Suarez
- Starring: Paco García; Krystian Huerta
- Cinematography: Paul Araujo
- Edited by: Diego Barragan
- Music by: Alvaro Arce Urroz; Carlos Alberto García Michel; Diego A. Orozco Gutiérrez
- Production companies: Benuca Films; Cine Chacal; Ideagrama Media Group
- Release dates: October 22, 2021 (AFF); January 25, 2024 (Mexico)
- Running time: 84 minutes
- Country: Mexico
- Language: Spanish

Don't Go to School Tomorrow (Spanish: No vayas a clase mañana, lit. 'Don't go to class tomorrow') is a 2021 Mexican coming-of-age drama film written and directed by Diego Barragan in his directorial debut. It stars Paco García and Krystian Huerta. It is about two 15-year-old teenagers who suffer bullying at their school, so they plan to carry out a school shooting.

== Synopsis ==
After being harassed and bullied by their schoolmates, 15-year-old teenagers Emilio and Jorge decide to devise a school shooting, they already have the gun, only the bullets are missing.

== Cast ==
- Paco García as Emilio
- Krystian Huerta as Jorge
- Luz García as Regina
- Jony Perdomo as Carlos
- Said Sandoval as Omar
- Paola Garcia as Claudia
- Cristo Fernández as Rafa (Cholo Leader)
- Carlos Ernesto as Ruben
- Eduardo Galeazzi as Teacher Robles
- Hazael Montecristo as Coach

== Production ==
Principal photography was planned to begin in March 2020, but had to be delayed due to the COVID-19 pandemic. Filming began in June 2020 in Guadalajara and Zapopan, Mexico with a duration of 15 days.

== Release ==
It had its international premiere on October 22, 2021, as part of the Austin Film Festival Official Selection. Subsequently, it screened at the beginning of December 2021 at the International Latino, Uruguayan and Brazilian Film Festival and at the end of that month it participated in the Capri Hollywood International Film Festival. It screened on March 13, 2022, at the San Diego Latino Film Festival, USA. It screened in Mexican territory for the first time at the end of July 2022 at the Guanajuato International Film Festival. It was commercially released on January 25, 2024, in Mexican theaters.

== Accolades ==
Year	Award / Festival	Category	Recipient	Result	Ref.
2021	Austin Film Festival	Best Narrative Feature	Don't Go to School Tomorrow	Won	
2021	Capri Hollywood International Film Festival	Capri Special Award - Best Long Feature	Don't Go to School Tomorrow	Nominated	
2021	International Latino, Uruguayan and Brazilian Film Festival	Best Actor	Paco García	Won	
2021	International Latino, Uruguayan and Brazilian Film Festival	Special Mention of the Jury	Don't Go to School Tomorrow	Won	
2022	San Diego Latino Film Festival	Best Narrative Feature	Don't Go to School Tomorrow	Nominated	
2022	Philadelphia Latino Film Festival	Los Features	Don't Go to School Tomorrow	Nominated	
2022	Guanajuato International Film Festival	Best Mexican Feature Film	Don't Go to School Tomorrow	Nominated	
2022	Great Mexican Film Party	Best Film	Don't Go to School Tomorrow	Won	
2022	Great Mexican Film Party	Best Director	Diego Barragan	Won	
2023	Diosas de Plata	Best Film	Alex Barragan & Miranda Guzman	Nominated	
2023	Diosas de Plata	Best First Work	Diego Barragan	Won	
2023	Diosas de Plata	Best Direction	Diego Barragan	Nominated	
2023	Diosas de Plata	Best Screenplay	Diego Barragan	Nominated	
2023	Diosas de Plata	Best Newcomer - Male	Paco García	Nominated	
2023	Diosas de Plata	Best Newcomer - Male	Krystian Huerta	Nominated	
2023	Diosas de Plata	Best Cinematography	Paul Araujo	Nominated	
2023	Diosas de Plata	Best Music	Alvaro Arce Urroz	Nominated	
2023	Diosas de Plata	Best Original Song	Carlos Alberto García Michel & Diego A. Orozco Gutiérrez ("Bajo Mundo")	Nominated	
