= Beto Benites =

Venezuelan casting director and actor

- Born: 1970 (age 55–56)
- Occupations: Actor, casting director, and producer

Beto Benites (born c. 1970) is a Peruvian actor, casting director, and producer.

In 2011, he played the part of Don Luis Sandoval, the drug lord in Olivier Megaton's film Colombiana, starring Zoe Saldaña.

== Filmography ==
=== Film ===
Year	Title	Role	Notes
1991	Alias 'La Gringa'	"Loco" Betún	
2000	At Midnight and a Half	Lanchero Lucho	
2007	Cyrano Fernández	Rosendo	
2007	Postcards from Leningrad	Cadenas	
2008	Macuro	Evaristo	
2010	Hermano	Morocho	
2011	Colombiana	Luis Sandoval	
2011	The Kid Who Lies	Roncha	
2012	La vida precoz y breve de Sabina Rivas	Añorve	
2013	Bad Hair	"El Jefe"	
2014	3 Beauties	Presentador de Colegio	
2015	Babysitting 2	Le Chef des Secouristes	
2015	Km 72	Inspector Parodi	
2015	Paquete #3	"El Cholo"	
2019	We're All Sailors	Official Ramiro	
2020	Throw Everything Into Play	Don Chuncho	
2022	La Reina del Sur 3	Ruben	Rol principal
2023	The Erection of Toribio Bardelli	Ruben	
2024	Ramón and Ramón		
2024	Zafari	Flaco	
