= Sirenas =

- Theatrical release poster
- Directed by: Nelson “Koko” Castillo
- Written by: Nelson “Koko” Castillo
- Starring: Lucy Bacigalupo
- Cinematography: Rafael Gutiérrez
- Music by: Estanis Mogollón
- Production companies: Strategy; Star Films
- Distributed by: Star Films
- Release date: December 4, 2025
- Running time: 117 minutes
- Country: Peru
- Language: Spanish

Sirenas is a 2025 Peruvian thriller drama film written and directed by Nelson “Koko” Castillo. It stars Lucy Bacigalupo accompanied by Diva Rivera, Estelita Ochoa, Cielo Lozano, and Jazmín Martínez.

== Synopsis ==
In Iquitos’ oldest brothel, the murder of a sex worker turns a farewell celebration into an investigation filled with suspicion, secrets, and inequality.

== Cast ==
The actors participating in this film are:

- Lucy Bacigalupo as 'La Chuchupe'
- Diva Rivera as Estrella
- Estelita Ochoa
- Cielo Lozano
- Jazmín Martínez
- Luis Rosadio as 'Chino Chuy'
- Dialy Freitas as Lula
- Kevin Mejía as Willy

== Financing ==
The film won the 2024 National Film Development Incentive Award, exclusive to the regions, granted by the Ministry of Culture for filming.

== Release ==
The film premiered on December 4, 2025, in Peruvian theaters.

== Box office ==
On its first day in theaters, it drew 650 viewers, ending its first weekend with a total of 2000 viewers.
