= Shipibos Stories =

2023 Peruvian drama film

- Film poster
- Spanish: Historias de shipibos
- Directed by: Omar Forero
- Written by: Omar Forero
- Produced by: Omar Forero
- Starring: Chelssy Fernández; Llimmy Márquez; Andry Azán; Luis Márquez
- Cinematography: Luis Tirado Ordoñez
- Edited by: Omar Forero
- Music by: Lucho Barrera
- Production company: Cine de Barrio
- Release date: 14 August 2023; (Lima)
- Running time: 117 minutes
- Country: Peru
- Languages: Shipibo; Spanish

Shipibos Stories (Spanish: Historias de shipibos) is a 2023 Peruvian drama film written, produced and directed by Omar Forero.

== Synopsis ==
A Shipibo boy is raised by his grandparents in direct contact with the Amazon forest and its inhabitants, whom he respects; he is considered part of their social environment. Growing up and coming into contact with urban life, the child denies his culture to avoid discrimination.

== Cast ==
- Chelssy Fernández
- Llimmy Márquez
- Andry Azán
- Luis Márquez

== Release ==
Shipibos Stories had its world premiere on August 14, 2023, as part of the Fiction competition at the 27th Lima Film Festival.

== Accolades ==
Year	Award / Festival	Category	Recipient	Result	Ref.
2023	27th Lima Film Festival	Best Picture	Shipibos Stories	Nominated	
2023	27th Lima Film Festival	International Critics' Jury Award for Best Film - Second Honorable Mention	Shipibos Stories	Won	
2024	15th APRECI Awards	Best Peruvian Feature Film	Shipibos Stories	Nominated	
2024	15th APRECI Awards	Best Director	Omar Forero	Nominated	
2024	15th APRECI Awards	Best Supporting Actor	Andry Azán	Won	
2024	15th APRECI Awards	Best Supporting Actor	Luis Márquez	Nominated	
2024	15th APRECI Awards	Best Screenplay	Omar Forero	Nominated	
2024	11th Huánuco Film Festival	Best Feature Film in Fiction Premiere	Shipibos Stories	Won	

== See also ==
- List of Peruvian films
