= APRECI Award for Best Supporting Actor =

Film award

- Awarded for: Best Supporting Actor for a Peruvian film
- Country: Peru
- Presented by: Asociación Peruana de Prensa Cinematográfica
- Currently held by: Andry Azán – Shipibos Stories (2024)

The APRECI Award for Supporting Actor (Spanish: Premio APRECI a mejor actor de reparto) is one of the annual awards given at the APRECI Awards, presented by the Asociación Peruana de Prensa Cinematográfica. It was first presented in 2017.

== Winners and nominees ==
=== 2010s ===
Year	Actress	Role(s)	English title	Original title	Ref.
2017 (9th)	Lucho Cáceres	Ramón	One Last Afternoon	La última tarde	
2018 (10th)	Emanuel Soriano	José "Montana" Hernández	Django: Sangre de mi sangre		
2018 (10th)	Oscar Alarcón		Complex Cases	Casos complejos	
2018 (10th)	Carlos Cano	Army Major	The Pink House	La casa rosada	
2018 (10th)	Javier Valdés	Alfonso	El Abuelo		
2019 (11th)	Rodrigo Sánchez Patiño	Toño	The Clash	La bronca	
2019 (11th)	Amiel Cayo	Noé	Retablo		
2019 (11th)	Héctor Paredes		Complex Cases	Casos complejos	
2019 (11th)	Miguel Iza	The Drunk	Aj Zombies!		

=== 2020s ===
Year	Actress	Role(s)	English title	Original title	Ref.
2021 (13th)	Rodrigo Palacios	Daniel	LXI (61)		
2021 (13th)	Sebastián Rubio	Cristian	LXI (61)		
2022 (14th)	Fernando Bacilio	Luis	The Shape of Things to Come	Tiempos futuros	
2022 (14th)	Melvin Quijada	Víctor	Bantamweight	Peso Gallo	
2022 (14th)	Ismael Contreras	Head of Archives	Operation Condor	La pena máxima	
2022 (14th)	Jeremi García	Baca	The Shape of Things to Come	Tiempos futuros	
2023 (15th)	Andry Azán		Shipibos Stories	Historias de shipibos	
2023 (15th)	Gianfranco Brero	Gerardo	The Last Laugh	Muerto de risa	
2023 (15th)	Salvador del Solar	Fernando	How to Deal With a Heartbreak	Soltera codiciada 2	
2023 (15th)	Luis Márquez		Shipibos Stories	Historias de shipibos	
