= APRECI Award for Best International Premiere =

Film award

- Awarded for: Best International Premiere of the Year
- Country: Peru
- Presented by: Asociación Peruana de Prensa Cinematográfica
- Currently held by: Fallen Leaves (2024)

The APRECI Award for Best International Premiere (Spanish: Premio APRECI al mejor estreno internacional) is one of the annual awards given at the APRECI Awards, presented by the Asociación Peruana de Prensa Cinematográfica. It was first presented in 2017.

== Winners and nominees ==
=== 2010s ===
Year	English title	Original title	Director	Ref.
2017 (9th)	Toni Erdmann		Maren Ade	
2018 (10th)	Phantom Thread		Paul Thomas Anderson	
2018 (10th)	Roma		Alfonso Cuarón	
2018 (10th)	Hereditary		Ari Aster	
2018 (10th)	The Square		Ruben Östlund	
2018 (10th)	The House by the Sea	La villa	Robert Guédiguian	
2018 (10th)	Zama		Lucrecia Martel	
2019 (11th)	The Irishman		Martin Scorsese	
2019 (11th)	Marriage Story		Noah Baumbach	
2019 (11th)	Once Upon a Time in Hollywood		Quentin Tarantino	
2019 (11th)	Pain and Glory	Dolor y gloria	Pedro Almodóvar	

=== 2020s ===
Year	English title	Original title	Director	Ref.
2020 (12th)	Mank		David Fincher	
2020 (12th)	Never Rarely Sometimes Always		Eliza Hittman	
2020 (12th)	One in a Thousand	Las mil y una	Clarisa Navas	
2021 (13th)	Annette		Leos Carax	
2021 (13th)	Petite Maman		Céline Sciamma	
2021 (13th)	The Last Duel		Ridley Scott	
2021 (13th)	The Power of the Dog		Jane Campion	
2022 (14th)	Aftersun		Charlotte Wells	
2022 (14th)	Top Gun: Maverick		Joseph Kosinski	
2022 (14th)	Argentina, 1985		Santiago Mitre	
2022 (14th)	Memoria		Apichatpong Weerasethakul	
2023 (15th)	Fallen Leaves	Kuolleet lehdet	Aki Kaurismäki	
2023 (15th)	Killers of the Flower Moon		Martin Scorsese	
2023 (15th)	Oppenheimer		Christopher Nolan	
2023 (15th)	Pictures of Ghosts	Retratos Fantasmas	Kleber Mendonça Filho	
