= Amor Erizo =

- Theatrical release poster
- Directed by: P.J. Ruiz
- Written by: P.J. Ruiz
- Produced by: Eliana Illescas
- Starring: Patricia Barreto; Óscar Meza
- Cinematography: Pili Flores-Guerra
- Edited by: Eric Williams
- Music by: José Chick
- Release date: January 23, 2025
- Running time: 80 minutes
- Country: Peru
- Language: Spanish

Amor Erizo (lit. 'Hedgehog love') is a 2025 Peruvian romantic comedy-drama film written and directed by P.J. Ruiz in his directorial debut. It stars Patricia Barreto and Óscar Meza accompanied by Cindy Díaz, Alicia Mercado, Monserrat Brugué, Miguel Iza and Naima Luna.

== Synopsis ==
Alicia and Eduardo, a couple who, after getting married and buying a house together, adopt two adorable hedgehogs while they wait to become parents. However, as time goes by, they begin to question whether they are really living the life they wanted.

== Cast ==
- Patricia Barreto as Alicia
- Óscar Meza as Eduardo
- Cindy Díaz
- Alicia Mercado
- Monserrat Brugué
- Miguel Iza
- Naima Luna
- Patricia Frayssinet
- Cecilia Rechkemmer
- Carlos Vertiz

== Release ==
The film was released on January 23, 2025, in Peruvian theaters.
