= Ramón and Ramón =

- Peruvian theatrical release poster
- Directed by: Salvador del Solar
- Screenplay by: Héctor Gálvez; Salvador del Solar
- Story by: Miguel Valladares Vives
- Produced by: Roxana Rivera
- Starring: Emanuel Soriano; Álvaro Cervantes
- Cinematography: Inti Briones
- Edited by: Pablo Riera; Eric Williams
- Music by: Gabriel Casacuberta; Hernán González Villamil
- Production companies: Tondero Producciones; El Deseo; Circular Media
- Distributed by: BTeam Pictures
- Release dates: September 25, 2024 (Zinemaldia); June 27, 2025 (Spain); August 8, 2025 (Peru)
- Running time: 100 minutes
- Countries: Peru; Spain; Uruguay
- Language: Spanish
- Box office: $12,758

Ramón and Ramón (Spanish: Ramón y Ramón) is a 2024 drama film co-written and directed by Salvador del Solar. An international co-production between Peru, Spain and Uruguay, the film stars Emanuel Soriano and Álvaro Cervantes. It follows the journey of two men to Concepción after the sudden death of one of their fathers.

== Synopsis ==
After receiving the ashes of his father, with whom he had a distant relationship, Ramón meets Mateo during confinement. Despite their differences, a deep connection emerges that leads them to question each other. Mateo decides to accompany Ramón on a trip to scatter the ashes in Huancayo. On this journey, Ramón discovers that he was searching for answers to the wrong questions and that he must heal to move forward.

== Cast ==
The actors participating in this film are:

- Emanuel Soriano as Ramón
- Álvaro Cervantes as Mateo
- Dario Yazbek Bernal
- Beto Benites
- Carlos Mesta
- Jely Reategui
- Bruno Odar
- Liliana Trujillo
- Ebelin Ortiz
- Lucho Ramírez
- Julián Vargas

== Production ==
Principal photography began on February 16, 2024, and lasted five weeks under the provisional title of Ramón. Filming took place on location in Lima and Junín.

== Release ==
The film had its world premiere on September 25, 2024, at the 72nd San Sebastian International Film Festival, then screened on May 2, 2025, at the 26th Jeonju International Film Festival, and on August 8, 2025, at the 29th Lima Film Festival.

It was commercially released on June 27, 2025, in Spanish theaters, and on August 8, 2025, in Peruvian theaters.

== Accolades ==
| Award | Ceremony date | Category | Recipient(s) | Result | Ref. |
|---|---|---|---|---|---|
| San Sebastián International Film Festival | 28 September 2024 | Horizontes Latinos Award | Ramón and Ramón | Nominated | |
