= Nanito =

- Theatrical release poster
- Directed by: Guillermo Fernández Cano
- Written by: Guillermo Fernández Cano
- Produced by: Walter Manrique
- Starring: Guido Calderón
- Cinematography: Pierre Pastor
- Edited by: Hans Matos
- Music by: Fernando Salazar
- Production company: Yapa Films
- Distributed by: V&R Films
- Release date: September 18, 2025
- Running time: 90 minutes
- Country: Peru
- Language: Spanish
- Budget: $150,000

Nanito is a 2025 Peruvian romantic drama film written and directed by Guillermo Fernández Cano in his directorial debut. It stars Guido Calderón as an 80-year-old man named Nanito who reunites with an old flame from his past. The rest of the cast includes Martha Rebaza, Roberto Palacios, María Eugenia Málaga, and Andrés Luque.

== Synopsis ==
Nanito is an 80-year-old man who feels lonelier with each passing day; however, he sees a glimmer of hope in Antonia, an old love from his past who never materialized, but who may now become a reality, faced by many older adults around the world.

== Cast ==
- Guido Calderón as Nanito
- Martha Rebaza as Antonia
- Roberto Palacios as Kenneth
- María Eugenia Málaga as Alma
- Andrés Luque as Marco
- Jovan Pastor Portocarrero as Leandro
- Arturo Salazar Monroy as Doctor
- Estefanía Fuxet Vera as Asylum nurse
- Román Lizárraga Santos as Taxi driver
- Teffy Bengoa Urizar as Hospital nurse
- Natalia Rivas Hurtado as Asylum receptionist
- Sofía Arias Cabrera as Granddaughter
- Samuel Soto Sumari as Grandson

== Production ==
Principal photography began on May 1, 2024, and wrapped at the end of the same month on locations in Yanahuara, Vallecito, and José Luis Bustamante y Rivero, Arequipa.

== Release ==
The film premiered on September 18, 2025, in Peruvian theaters by V&R Films.
