= APRECI Award for Best Actor =

Film award

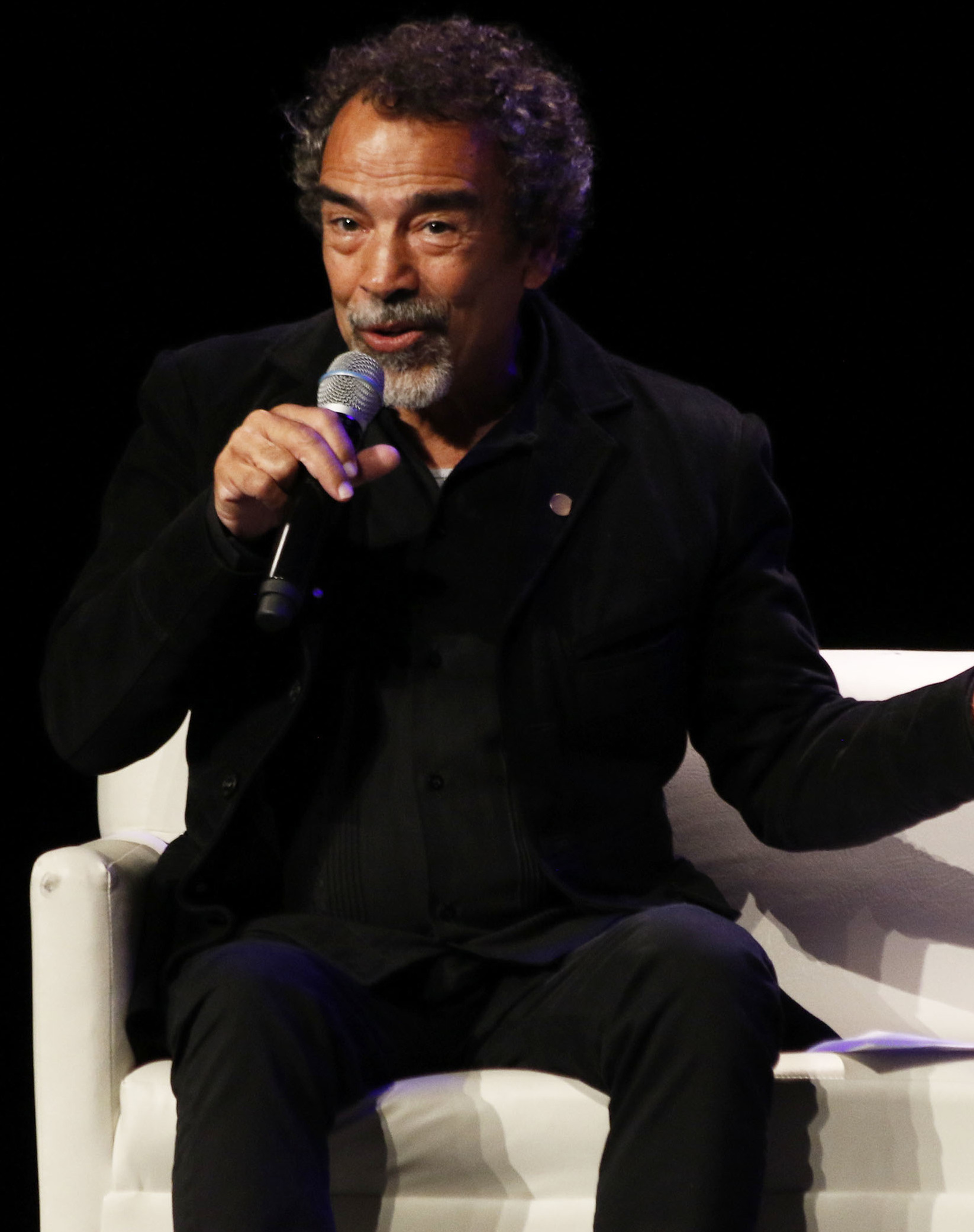
- The 2024 recipient: Damián Alcázar
- Awarded for: Best Actor for a Peruvian film
- Country: Peru
- Presented by: Asociación Peruana de Prensa Cinematográfica
- Currently held by: Damián Alcázar – The Monroy Affaire (2024)

The APRECI Award for Best Actor (Spanish: Premio APRECI a mejor actor) is one of the annual awards given at the APRECI Awards, presented by the Asociación Peruana de Prensa Cinematográfica. It was first presented in 2017.

== Winners and nominees ==
=== 2010s ===
Year	Actor	Role(s)	English title	Original title	Ref.
2017 (9th)	Lucho Cáceres	Ramón	One Last Afternoon	La última tarde	
2018 (10th)	Miguel Iza	Vladimiro Montesinos	Caiga quien caiga		
2018 (10th)	Vicente Catacora	Willka	Eternity	Wiñaypacha	
2018 (10th)	José Luis Adrianzen	Adrián Mendoza Torres	The Pink House	La casa rosada	
2018 (10th)	Giovanni Ciccia	Orlando "Django" Hernández	Django: Sangre de mi sangre		
2019 (11th)	Rodrigo Palacios	Bob Montoya	The Clash	La bronca	
2019 (11th)	Gianfranco Brero	Alejandro	Norte		
2019 (11th)	Jorge Guerra	Roberto	The Clash	La bronca	
2019 (11th)	Júnior Béjar	Segundo	Retablo		

=== 2020s ===
Year	Actor	Role(s)	English title	Original title	Ref.
2020 (12th)	Jesús Luque Colque	Elisban	Powerful Chief	Manco Cápac	
2020 (12th)	Amiel Cayo	Celestino	Samichay, In Search of Happiness	Samichay, en busca de la felicidad	
2020 (12th)	Alejandro Vargas Vilela		We're All Sailors	Todos somos marineros	
2021 (13th)	Tommy Párraga	Pedro	Song Without a Name	Canción sin nombre	
2021 (13th)	Luis Ramírez	Carlos Espejo	El viaje macho		
2022 (14th)	Víctor Acurio	Sistu	Willaq Pirqa, the Cinema of My Village	Willaq Pirqa, el cine de mi pueblo	
2022 (14th)	Miguel Iza	Miguel	Long Distance	Larga distancia	
2022 (14th)	Lorenzo Molina	Teo	The Shape of Things to Come	Tiempos futuros	
2022 (14th)	Emanuel Soriano	Félix Chacaltana	Operation Condor	La pena máxima	
2023 (15th)	Damián Alcázar	Ronnie Monroy	The Monroy Affaire	El caso Monroy	
2023 (15th)	Jesús Luque Colque	Reinaldo Cutipa	Reinaldo Cutipa		
2023 (15th)	Cecilio Quispe	Don Evaristo	Yana-Wara		
2023 (15th)	César Ritter	Javi Fuentes	The Last Laugh	Muerto de risa	
