= Josué Méndez =

Peruvian film director

Josué Méndez (born September 18, 1976, in Lima, Peru) is a Peruvian film director including Days of Santiago (2004), Gods (2008) and The Monroy Affaire (2022). Days of Santiago is about a cab driver in Lima, Peru. It was Peru's official nomination into the 2006 Academy Awards.

== See also ==
- Claudia Llosa
- Francisco Lombardi
- Alberto Durant
