= Moon Heart =

El corazón de la luna
- Theatrical release poster
- Spanish: El corazón de la luna
- Directed by: Aldo Salvini
- Written by: Aldo Salvini
- Produced by: Gerardo Arias; Macarena Coello; Julio Wissar
- Starring: Haydeé Cáceres
- Cinematography: Micaela Cajahuaringa
- Music by: Karin Zielinski
- Production companies: University of Lima; CREA
- Release dates: 26 October 2021 (SCI-FI London Film Festival); 27 October 2022 (Peru)
- Running time: 80 minutes
- Country: Peru

Moon Heart (Spanish: El corazón de la luna) is a 2021 Peruvian science fiction drama film written and directed by Aldo Salvini and starring Haydeé Cáceres. The film tells the story of M, an old homeless woman who one day sees a mechanical angel that will change her life. The film was selected by the Ministry of Culture as the Peruvian entry in the Best International Film at the 95th Academy Awards.

== Cast ==
- Haydeé Cáceres as M

== Production ==
The film was entirely produced by the Audiovisual Creation Center of the University of Lima (Crea). The script was given to Gerardo Arias more than five years ago under the title "Perro Negro (Black Dog)".

== Release ==
The film had its international premiere at the SCI-FI London Film Festival on October 26, 2021, where it received the award for Best Feature Film. The film was commercially released on October 27, 2022 in Peruvian theaters.

== Awards ==
- Best film at the Sci-Fi London Festival.
- Best Actress for Haydeé Cáceres at the Sydney Science Fiction Film Festival.
- Best actress for Haydeé Cáceres at Fantaspoa, the fantastic film festival in Porto Alegre (Brazil).
- Best Actress for Haydeé Cáceres at the 47th Boston Science Fiction Film Festival.

== See also ==
- List of submissions to the 95th Academy Awards for Best International Feature Film
- List of Peruvian submissions for the Academy Award for Best International Feature Film
