= Klaudia Reynicke =

Swiss-Peruvian filmmaker (born 1976)

- Born: Lima, Peru
- Occupations: Film director, screenwriter

Klaudia Reynicke is a Swiss-Peruvian filmmaker.

== Early life and education ==
Reynicke was born in Lima, where she lived until age ten. She spent much of her early life in Switzerland and Florida. She earned a bachelor's degree from the University of South Florida, where she studied visual arts and anthropology, and a master's degree in sociology from the University of Lausanne.

In 2005, Reynicke studied film at the New York University Tisch School of the Arts. She later completed a master's degree in film studies through a joint program from École cantonale d'art de Lausanne and Geneva University of Art and Design.

== Career ==
Reynicke directed her first short film, Great Expectations: NY, in 2005 while at New York University. After graduating from the ECAL-HEAD joint program in 2010, she participated in the Berlinale Talent Campus program. She then directed a series of documentary features and shorts including the autobiographical ¿Asi son los hombres?, Mermaids, about performers at Weeki Wachee Springs, and Il Matrimonio, about an elderly couple getting married.

In 2016, Reynicke's debut feature film Il nido debuted at that year's edition of the Locarno Film Festival. Her 2019 film Love Me Tender premiered at the 72nd Locarno Film Festival and later screened in the Discovery section at the Toronto International Film Festival.

Reinas, Reynicke's film about a mother and her daughters trying to escape the instability of 1990s Peru, premiered at the 2024 Sundance Film Festival and was later awarded the Grand Prix of the Generation Kplus International Jury for the Best Film at the 74th Berlin International Film Festival, Prix du Public UBS at the 77th Locarno Film Festival and Best Screenplay prize at the 28th Lima Film Festival.

== Filmography ==
Year	Title	Notes	Ref.
2005	Great Expectations: NY	Short film	
2008	Casual Thoughts	Short film	
2008	Mamette	Short film	
2008	Noces argentiniques	Short film	
2010	La Chienne	Short film	
2013	¿Asì son los hombres?	Documentary	
2014	Mermaids	Documentary short	
2014	Il matrimonio	Documentary	
2016	Il nido (The Nest)	—N/a	
2019	Love Me Tender	—N/a	
2022	La vie devant	Directed with Kristina Wagenbauer	
2024	Reinas	—N/a	

== Awards and nominations ==
Year	Award	Category	Nominated work	Result	Ref.
2016	Locarno Film Festival	Golden Leopard – Filmmakers of the Present	Il nido	Nominated	
2017	Santa Barbara International Film Festival	Anti-Defamation League Stand Up Award	Il nido	Nominated	
2019	Locarno Film Festival	Golden Leopard – Filmmakers of the Present	Love Me Tender	Nominated	
2024	Sundance Film Festival	World Dramatic Competition	Reinas	Nominated	
2024	Berlin International Film Festival	Grand Prix of the Generation Kplus International Jury	Reinas	Won	
2024	Locarno Film Festival	Prix du Public UBS - Audience Award Prize UBS	Reinas	Won	
