= APRECI Award for Best Supporting Actress =

Film award

- Awarded for: Best Supporting Actress for a Peruvian film
- Country: Peru
- Presented by: Asociación Peruana de Prensa Cinematográfica
- Currently held by: María Luque – The Most Feared Skin (2024)

The APRECI Award for Supporting Actress (Spanish: Premio APRECI a mejor actriz de reparto) is one of the annual awards given at the APRECI Awards, presented by the Asociación Peruana de Prensa Cinematográfica. It was first presented in 2017.

== Winners and nominees ==
=== 2010s ===
Year	Actress	Role(s)	English title	Original title	Ref.
2017 (9th)	Cindy Díaz	Sheyla	Rosa Chumbe		
2018 (10th)	Camila Mac Lennan	Aunt Rosa	The Pink House	La casa rosada	
2018 (10th)	Stephanie Orúe	Magda	Django: Sangre de mi sangre		
2018 (10th)	Anahí de Cárdenas	Sol	Don't Call Me Spinster	No me digas solterona	
2018 (10th)	Anahí de Cárdenas	Claudia	Aj Zombies!		
2018 (10th)	Anahí de Cárdenas	Pamela	¡Asu mare! 3		
2018 (10th)	Hermelinda Luján		Southern Winds	Vientos del sur	
2019 (11th)	Magaly Solier	Anatolia	Retablo		
2019 (11th)	Isabelle Guérard	Sophie	The Clash	La bronca	
2019 (11th)	Máfer Gutiérrez	Georgina	What Couples Do	Los helechos	

=== 2020s ===
Year	Actress	Role(s)	English title	Original title	Ref.
2020 (12th)	Delfina Paredes	Gloria	The Restoration	La restauración	
2020 (12th)	Julia Thays	Sonia	We're All Sailors	Todos somos marineros	
2021 (13th)	Cynthia Moreno	Gabriela	LXI (61)		
2021 (13th)	Grapa Paola	Alicia	The Best Families	Las mejores familias	
2021 (13th)	Sonia Seminario	Mamama Teté	The Best Families	Las mejores familias	
2021 (13th)	Wendy Vásquez	Irene	Autoerotic	Autoerótica	
2022 (14th)	Hermelinda Luján	Mamá Simona	Willaq Pirqa, the Cinema of My Village	Willaq Pirqa, el cine de mi pueblo	
2022 (14th)	Paulina Bazán	Valeria	Antonia	Antonia en la vida	
2022 (14th)	Rosalía Clemente	Digna	Bantamweight	Peso Gallo	
2022 (14th)	Stephanie Orúe	Cecilia	La decisión de Amelia		
2023 (15th)	María Luque	Dominga	The Most Feared Skin	La piel más temida	
2023 (15th)	Michele Abascal	Luz Bardelli	The Erection of Toribio Bardelli	La erección de Toribio Bardelli	
2023 (15th)	Liliana Trujillo	Lucy	The Monroy Affaire	El caso Monroy	
2023 (15th)	Wendy Vásquez	Príncipe	The Monroy Affaire	El caso Monroy	
