= APRECI Awards =

- Current: 2025 APRECI Awards
- Awarded for: Awarded for best cinema of the year
- Country: Peru
- Presented by: Asociación Peruana de Prensa Cinematográfica
- First award: September 18, 2009; 17 years ago
- Website: apreci.org

The APRECI Awards (Spanish: Premios APRECI) are awards given by the Asociación Peruana de Prensa Cinematográfica, which reward the best Peruvian film productions of the year. The award has been awarded annually since 2009.

== History ==
The Asociación Peruana de Prensa Cinematográfica was founded on August 4, 2007, at the 11th Lima Film Festival. 2 years later, they created the APRECI Awards with the intention of recognizing quality Peruvian and Latin American feature films and, in turn, promoting the art of cinema.

The first award ceremony took place on December 18, 2009, at the José María Arguedas Cultural Center located in Lima, Peru. where the film The Milk of Sorrow by Claudia Llosa was awarded as Best Peruvian Feature Film. During the first 8 years since its creation, only a single award was awarded: Best Peruvian Feature Film. However, starting with the ninth ceremony, new categories were implemented: in 2017, Best Actor, Best Actress, Best Supporting Actor, Best Supporting Actress, Best Screenplay and Best International Premiere; in 2019, Best Documentary; and in 2022, Best Director.

== Awards ==
- Best Peruvian Feature Film
- Best Director
- Best Leading Actor
- Best Leading Actress
- Best Screenplay
- Best Supporting Actor
- Best Supporting Actress
- Best Documentary
- Best Short Film
- Best International Premiere
