= Retablo (film) =

2017 film directed by Alvaro Delgado-Aparicio

- Peruvian theatrical release poster
- Directed by: Alvaro Delgado-Aparicio
- Written by: Alvaro Delgado-Aparicio, Hector Galvez
- Produced by: Enid Campos; Alvaro Delgado-Aparicio; Lasse Scharpen; Menno Döring
- Starring: Junior Bejar Roca; Amiel Cayo; Magaly Solier
- Cinematography: Mario Bassino
- Edited by: Eric Williams
- Music by: Harry Escott
- Production companies: Siri Producciones; Catch of the Day Films (Summerhill Lights); DHF
- Release dates: 17 August 2017 (Lima); 16 May 2019 (Peru)
- Running time: 95 minutes
- Countries: Peru; Germany; Norway
- Language: Quechua

Retablo is a 2017 Quechua-language drama film directed by Alvaro Delgado-Aparicio. The film is an international production with the participation of Peru, Germany and Norway. The cast also includes Magaly Solier as Anatolia, Segundo's mother and Noé's wife. Delgado-Aparicio's full-length directorial debut, the film is written and acted in Ayacucho Quechua. It is a co-production between Peru, Germany and Norway.

== Plot ==
The film follows Segundo (Junior Bejar Roca), a young boy in Ayacucho in rural Peru whose father Noé (Amiel Cayo) is training him in the family tradition of designing and building religious retablos, but whose secret shatters Segundo's world and everything he believes in.

== Release ==
The film premiered at the 2017 Lima Film Festival, where it won the award for Best Peruvian Film. It had its international premiere at the 2018 Berlin International Film Festival, where it won a Teddy Award as the best LGBTQ-themed debut film of the festival. In 2019 it won the Havana Star Prize for Best Film (Fiction) at the 20th Havana Film Festival New York.

It was selected as the Peruvian entry for the Best International Feature Film at the 92nd Academy Awards, but it was not nominated.

== See also ==
- List of submissions to the 92nd Academy Awards for Best International Feature Film
- List of Peruvian submissions for the Academy Award for Best International Feature Film
