= Luces Award for Best Film =

The Luces Award for Best Film is one of the awards given by the newspaper El Comercio in recognition of those outstanding Peruvian films of the previous year. While the nominees in this category are chosen by El Comercio workers, the winners are chosen by the general public.

The current Peruvian production that holds the award is the historical thriller feature Chavín De Huántar: The Rescue of the Century directed by Diego de León, with the winners announced on April 23, 2026.

== Winners and nominees ==
=== 2000s ===
Year	English Title	Original Title	Director(s)	Ref.
2005 (1st)	The Brown Leader	El caudillo pardo	Aldo Salvini	
2005 (1st)	Cuando el cielo es azul		Sandra Wiese	
2005 (1st)	A Day Without Sex	Un día sin sexo	Frank Pérez-Garland	
2005 (1st)	Pirates in Callao	Piratas en el Callao	Eduardo Schuldt	
2005 (1st)	Mañana te cuento		Eduardo Mendoza de Echave	
2006 (2nd)	Madeinusa		Claudia Llosa	
2006 (2nd)	Black Butterfly	Mariposa negra	Francisco Lombardi	
2006 (2nd)	Chicha tu madre		Gianfranco Quattrini	
2006 (2nd)	The Trial	La prueba	Judith Vélez	
2007 (3rd)	Muero por Muriel		Augusto Cabada	
2008 (4th)	Vidas paralelas		Rocío Lladó	

=== 2010s ===
Year	English Title	Original Title	Director(s)	Ref.
2010 (6th)	Undertow	Contracorriente	Javier Fuentes-León	
2010 (6th)	Ella		Francisco Lombardi	
2010 (6th)	October	Octubre	Daniel Vega Vidal, Diego Vega Vidal	
2010 (6th)	Paradise	Paraíso	Héctor Gálvez	
2010 (6th)	The Vigil	La vigilia	Augusto Tamayo	
2011 (7th)	The Bad Intentions	Las malas intenciones	Rosario García-Montero	
2011 (7th)	Bolero de noche		Eduardo Mendoza de Echave	
2011 (7th)	El guachimán		Gastón Vizcarra	
2011 (7th)	The Inca, The Silly Girl, and the Son of a Thief	El Inca, la boba y el hijo del ladrón	Ronnie Temoche	
2011 (7th)	The Last Chanka Warrior	El último guerrero Chanka	Víctor Zarabia	
2012 (8th)	Lima 13		Fabrizio Aguilar	
2012 (8th)	El Buen Pedro		Sandro Ventura	
2012 (8th)	Coliseo, los campeones		Alejandro Rossi	
2012 (8th)	Dark Heaven	Cielo oscuro	Joel Calero	
2012 (8th)	In House	Casadentro	Joanna Lombardi	
2013 (9th)	¡Asu mare!		Ricardo Maldonado	
2013 (9th)	The Cleaner	El limpiador	Adrián Saba	
2013 (9th)	The Gospel of the Flesh	El evangelio de la carne	Eduardo Mendoza de Echave	
2013 (9th)	I'm Still	Sigo siendo	Javier Corcuera	
2013 (9th)	The Space Between Things	El espacio entre las cosas	Raúl del Busto	
2014 (10th)	Guard Dog	Perro Guardián	Bacha Caravedo, Chinón Higashionna	
2014 (10th)	Chicama		Omar Forero	
2014 (10th)	El mudo		Daniel Vega Vidal, Diego Vega Vidal	
2014 (10th)	The Vanished Elephant	El elefante desaparecido	Javier Fuentes-León	
2014 (10th)	The Womb	El vientre	Daniel Rodríguez	
2015 (11th)	Magallanes		Salvador del Solar	
2015 (11th)	Avenida Larco, la película		Antonio Rodríguez Romaní	
2015 (11th)	Climates	Climas	Gianfranco Quattrini	
2015 (11th)	Just Like in the Movies	Como en el cine	Gonzalo Ladines	
2015 (11th)	NN	NN: Sin identidad	Héctor Gálvez	
2016 (12th)	When Two Worlds Collide	El choque de dos mundos	Heidi Brandenburg, Mathew Orzel	
2016 (12th)	Alone	Solos	Joanna Lombardi	
2016 (12th)	The Blue Hour	La hora azul	Evelyne Pegot	
2016 (12th)	Extirpator of Idolatries	Extirpador de idolatrías	Manuel Siles	
2016 (12th)	The Last News	La última noticia	Alejandro Legaspi	
2016 (12th)	Rolling Strong	Rodar contra todo	Marianela Vega	
2016 (12th)	Videophilia (and Other Viral Syndromes)	Videofilia (y otros síndromes virales)	Juan Daniel F. Molero	
2017 (13th)	The Last Hour	La hora final	Eduardo Mendoza de Echave	
2017 (13th)	The Light on the Hill	La luz en el cerro	Ricardo Velarde	
2017 (13th)	One Last Afternoon	La última tarde	Joel Calero	
2017 (13th)	Pacificum, Return to the Ocean	Pacificum, el retorno al océano	Mariana Tschudi	
2017 (13th)	Rosa Chumbe		Jonatan Relayze	
2017 (13th)	The Dreamer	El Soñador	Adrián Saba	
2017 (13th)	Wik		Rodrigo Moreno del Valle	
2018 (14th)	Don't Call Me Spinster	No me digas solterona	Ani Alva Helfer	
2018 (14th)	¡Asu mare! 3		Jorge Ulloa	
2018 (14th)	Django: sangre de mi sangre		Aldo Salvini	
2018 (14th)	Eternity	Wiñaypacha	Óscar Catacora	
2018 (14th)	Friends in Trouble	Amigos en apuros	Joel Calero, Lucho Cáceres	
2018 (14th)	How to Get Over a Breakup	Soltera codiciada	Bruno Ascenzo, Joanna Lombardi	
2018 (14th)	The Pink House	La casa rosada	Palito Ortega Matute	
2018 (14th)	Utopia	Utopía	Gino Tassara, Jorge Vilela de Rutte	
2019 (15th)	Retablo		Álvaro Delgado-Aparicio	
2019 (15th)	The Clash	La bronca	Daniel Vega Vidal, Diego Vega Vidal	
2019 (15th)	Complex Cases	Casos complejos	Omar Forero	
2019 (15th)	Django, en el nombre del hijo		Aldo Salvini	
2019 (15th)	Three Kids and a Dad	Papá x Tres	Sandro Ventura	
2019 (15th)	The Journey of Javier Heraud	El viaje de Javier Heraud	Javier Corcuera	
2019 (15th)	Living Unscathed	Vivir ilesos	Manuel Siles	
2019 (15th)	What Couples Do	Los helechos - Enredos de parejas	Antolín Prieto	
2019 (15th)	Youtuber Dad	Papá Youtuber	Fernando Villarán	

=== 2020s ===
Year	English Title	Original Title	Director(s)	Ref.
2020 (16th)	Powerful Chief	Manco Cápac	Henry Vallejo	
2020 (16th)	Circle of Chalk	Círculo de Tiza	Jean Alcócer, Diana Daf Collazos	
2020 (16th)	The Restoration	La restauración	Alonso Llosa	
2020 (16th)	Samichay, In Search of Happiness	Samichay, en busca de la felicidad	Mauricio Franco Tosso	
2020 (16th)	Soldier's Women	Mujer de soldado	Patricia Wiesse Risso	
2020 (16th)	The Song of the Butterflies	El canto de las mariposas	Nuria Frigola Torrent	
2020 (16th)	We're All Sailors	Todos somos marineros	Miguel Angel Moulet	
2021 (17th)	A World for Julius	Un mundo para Julius	Rossana Díaz Costa	
2021 (17th)	Ainbo: Spirit of the Amazon	Ainbo: El espíritu del Amazonas	José Zelada, Richard Claus	
2021 (17th)	The Best Families	Las mejores familias	Javier Fuentes-León	
2021 (17th)	La cantera		Miguel Barreda	
2021 (17th)	Fever Dream	Distancia de rescate	Claudia Llosa	
2021 (17th)	Song Without a Name	Canción sin nombre	Melina León	
2021 (17th)	El viaje macho		Luis Basurto	
2022 (18th)	Willaq Pirqa, the Cinema of My Village	Willaq Pirqa, el cine de mi pueblo	César Galindo	
2022 (18th)	About Everything There Is to Know	De todas las cosas que se han de saber	Sofia Velázquez	
2022 (18th)	Bantamweight	Peso gallo	Hans Matos Cámac	
2022 (18th)	Long Distance	Larga distancia	Franco Finocchiaro	
2022 (18th)	Moon Heart	El corazón de la luna	Aldo Salvini	
2022 (18th)	Pakucha		Tito Catacora	
2022 (18th)	The Shape of Things to Come	Tiempos futuros	Victor Manuel Checa	
2023 (19th)	Single, Married, Widowed, Divorced	Soltera, casada, viuda, divorciada	Ani Alva Helfer	
2023 (19th)	La decisión de Amelia		Francisco José Lombardi	
2023 (19th)	The Erection of Toribio Bardelli	La erección de Toribio Bardelli	Adrián Saba	
2023 (19th)	How to Deal With a Heartbreak	Soltera codiciada 2	Joanna Lombardi	
2023 (19th)	The Invisible Girl	La pampa	Dorian Fernández-Moris	
2023 (19th)	The Monroy Affaire	El caso Monroy	Josué Méndez	
2023 (19th)	Pirú: A Golden Journey	Pirú: Un viaje de oro	Bismarck Rojas	
2024 (20th)	Esta es la U		Daniel Farfán Salazar, Rodolfo Quiróz	
2024 (20th)	Chabuca		Jorge Carmona	
2024 (20th)	Dalia and the Red Book	Dalia y el libro rojo	David Bisbano	
2024 (20th)	The Last Laugh	Muerto de risa	Gonzalo Ladines	
2024 (20th)	Motherland	Kinra	Marco Panatonic	
2024 (20th)	Once Upon a Time in the Andes	Érase una vez en los Andes	Rómulo Sulca	
2024 (20th)	Reinaldo Cutipa		Oscar Gonzales Apaza	
2024 (20th)	Reinas		Klaudia Reynicke	
2024 (20th)	Yana-Wara		Óscar Catacora, Tito Catacora	
2025 (21st)	Chavín De Huántar: The Rescue of the Century	Chavín de Huántar: el rescate del siglo	Diego de León	
2025 (21st)	Heart of the Wolf	El corazón del lobo	Francisco José Lombardi	
2025 (21st)	Karuara, People of the River	Karuara, la gente del río	Miguel Araoz, Stephanie Boyd	
2025 (21st)	Mistura		Ricardo de Montreuil	
2025 (21st)	My Storylof		Benjamín Doig Espinoza	
2025 (21st)	Nanito		Guillermo Fernández Cano	
2025 (21st)	Night Has Come	Vino la noche	Paolo Tizón	
2025 (21st)	Ramón and Ramón	Ramón y Ramón	Salvador del Solar	
2025 (21st)	Single, Married, Widowed, Divorced 2	Soltera, casada, viuda, divorciada	Ani Alva Helfer	
2025 (21st)	Zafari		Mariana Rondón	
