= 2022 APRECI Awards =

Peruvian film awards

- Date: 3 May 2023
- Site: Ministry of Culture, Lima, Peru
- Organized by: Asociación Peruana de Prensa Cinematográfica

Highlights
- Best Picture: Willaq Pirqa, the Cinema of My Village
- Best Direction: César Galindo; Willaq Pirqa, the Cinema of My Village
- Best Actor: Víctor Acurio; Willaq Pirqa, the Cinema of My Village
- Best Actress: Haydeé Cáceres; Moon Heart
- Most awards: Willaq Pirqa, the Cinema of My Village (5)
- Most nominations: Willaq Pirqa, the Cinema of My Village (5)

The 2022 APRECI Awards, presented by the Asociación Peruana de Prensa Cinematográfica, took place at the Ministry of Culture in Lima, on 3 May 2023, to recognize the best Peruvian film productions of the year.

The nominations were announced on 10 April 2023.

== Winners and nominees ==
The winners and nominees are listed as follows:

Best Peruvian Feature Film: Willaq Pirqa, the Cinema of My Village; Indigenous' Slayer; Moon Heart; The Shape of Things to Come	Best Director: César Galindo – Willaq Pirqa, the Cinema of My Village; Tito Catacora – Pakucha; Aldo Salvini – Moon Heart; Oscar Sánchez Saldaña & Robert Julca Motta – Indigenous' Slayer
Best Screenplay: César Galindo, Augusto Cabada & Gastón Vizcarra – Willaq Pirqa, the Cinema of My Village; Victor Manuel Checa – The Shape of Things to Come; Aldo Salvini – Moon Heart; Oscar Sánchez Saldaña & Robert Julca Motta – Indigenous' Slayer	Best Leading Actor: Víctor Acurio – Willaq Pirqa, the Cinema of My Village; Miguel Iza – Long Distance; Lorenzo Molina – The Shape of Things to Come; Emanuel Soriano – Operation Condor
Best Leading Actress: Haydeé Cáceres – Moon Heart; Valquiria Huerta – Long Distance; Mayella Lloclla – La decisión de Amelia; Antonia Moreno – Antonia	Best Supporting Actor: Fernando Bacilio – The Shape of Things to Come; Melvin Quijada – Bantamweight; Ismael Contreras – Operation Condor; Jeremi García – The Shape of Things to Come
Best Supporting Actress: Hermelinda Luján – Willaq Pirqa, the Cinema of My Village; Paulina Bazán – Antonia; Rosalía Clemente – Bantamweight; Stephanie Orúe – La decisión de Amelia	Best Documentary: Pakucha; The Captives; Mirlo's Dance; Steel Life
Best International Premiere: Aftersun; Top Gun: Maverick; Argentina 1985; Memoria
