= 22nd Lima Film Festival =

2018 film festival

- Official poster of the 22nd Lima Film Festival
- Opening film: Ruben Blades Is Not My Name
- Location: Lima, Peru
- Founded: 1997
- Awards: Trophy Spondylus: The Dead and the Others
- Directors: Marco Mühletaler
- Festival date: 3–11 August 2018
- Website: festivaldelima.com

Lima Film Festival
- 23rd 21st

The 22nd Lima Film Festival, organized by the Pontifical Catholic University of Peru, took place from 3 to 11 August 2018 in Lima, Peru. The awards were announced on 11 August 2018, with The Dead and the Others winning the Trophy Spondylus.

== Background ==
In July 2018, the Lima Film Festival officially announced its 22nd edition, under the motto "Look with Freedom" (Spanish: Mira con Libertad) The festival took place from Friday, August 3rd to Saturday, August 11th, 2018. Organized by the Pontifical Catholic University of Peru, through its Cultural Center, and presented in collaboration with the BBVA Foundation, the Ministry of Culture of Peru, the Gran Teatro Nacional del Perú, and El Comercio, tickets for the event went on sale from July 27th, 2018, at the festival's official venues.

The event paid tribute to the careers of three individuals: Argentine filmmaker Fernando Solanas, Portuguese film producer Paulo Branco, and Peruvian cinematographer Pili Flores Guerra. Additionally, Alicia Morales and Ana María Teruel, both founders of the Lima Film Festival, received a special tribute.

== Juries ==
=== In Competition ===
==== Fiction ====
- Bertha Navarro, Mexican producer - Jury President
- Milagros Mumenthaler, Argentine filmmaker
- Antonia Zegers, Chilean actress
- Héctor Gálvez, Peruvian filmmaker
- Gustavo Rondón, Venezuelan filmmaker

==== Documentary ====
- Pamela Yates, American filmmaker - Jury President
- Sofia Velázquez, Peruvian filmmaker
- Everardo González, Mexican filmmaker

=== International Critics ===
- Josefina Sartora, Argentine professor and film critic - Jury President
- Ernesto Garratt, Chilean writer
- Reynaldo Ledgar, Peruvian architect and film critic

== Official Selection ==
The lineup of titles selected for the official selection include:

=== In Competition ===
==== Fiction ====
Highlighted title indicates award winner.

| English Title | Original Title | Director(s) | Production Countrie(s) |
|---|---|---|---|
| The Queen of Fear | La reina del miedo | Valeria Bertuccelli | Argentina; Denmark |
| Murder Me, Monster | Muere, monstruo, muere | Alejandro Fadel | Argentina; France; Chile |
| The Snatch Thief | El motoarrebatador | Agustin Toscano | Argentina; Uruguay; France |
| Hunting Season | Temporada de caza | Natalia Garagiola | Argentina; United States; France; Germany; Qatar |
| Good Manners | As Boas Maneiras | Juliana Rojas & Marco Dutra | Brazil; France |
| Los silencios | | Beatriz Seigner | Brazil; Colombia; France |
| The Dead and the Others | Chuva é Cantoria na Aldeia dos Mortos | João Salaviza & Renée Nader Messora | Brazil; Portugal |
| Oblivion Verses | Los versos del olvido | Alireza Khatami | Chile; France; Germany; Netherlands |
| Birds of Passage | Pájaros de verano | Ciro Guerra & Cristina Gallego | Colombia; Denmark; Mexico |
| Killing Jesus | Matar a Jesús | Laura Mora | Colombia; Argentina |
| Sergio and Sergei | Sergio & Sergei | Ernesto Daranas | Cuba; Spain |
| The Eternal Feminine | Los adioses | Natalia Beristáin | Mexico |
| The Heiresses | Las herederas | Marcelo Martinessi | Paraguay; Germany; Brazil; Uruguay; Norway; France |
| Complex Cases | Casos complejos | Omar Forero | Peru |
| What Couples Do | Los helechos | Antolín Prieto | Peru |
| Indigenous' Slayer | Mataindios | Oscar Sánchez Saldaña & Robert Julca Motta | Peru |
| We're All Sailors | Todos somos marineros | Miguel Angel Moulet | Peru; Dominican Republic |
| Silence of the Wind | El silencio del viento | Álvaro Aponte | Puerto Rico; Dominican Republic; France |

==== Documentary ====
Highlighted title indicates award winner.

| English Title | Original Title | Director(s) | Production Countrie(s) |
|---|---|---|---|
| Theatre of War | Teatro de guerra | Lola Arias | Argentina; Spain; Germany |
| Primas | | Laura Bari | Argentina; Canada |
| Silence Is a Falling Body | El silencio es un cuerpo que cae | Agustina Comedi | Argentina |
| Cocaine Prison | Los burritos | Violeta Ayala | Bolivia |
| Tranny Fag | Bixa Travesty | Claudia Priscilla & Kiko Goifman | Brazil |
| Stealing Rodin | Robar a Rodin | Cristóbal Valenzuela | Chile; France |
| El testigo: Caín y Abel | | Kate Horne | Colombia; Peru; England |
| Ayotzinapa: The Turtle’s Pace | Ayotzinapa, el paso de la tortuga | Enrique García Meza | Mexico |
| Away From Meaning | Lejos del sentido | Olivia Luengas Magaña | Mexico |
| The Search | La búsqueda | Mariano Agudo & Daniel Lagares | Peru; Spain |
| Seeing Again | Volver a ver | Judith Vélez | Peru |

==== Made in Peru ====
Highlighted title indicates award winner.

| English Title | Original Title | Director(s) | Production Countrie(s) |
|---|---|---|---|
| Sangra. Grita. Late! | | Aldo Miyashiro | Peru |
| Southern Winds | Vientos del sur | Franco García Becerra | Peru |
| Blue Frontier | Frontera azul | Jorge Carmona & Tito Köster | Peru; Namibia; Indonesia; United States; French Polynesia |
| The Bridge Master’s Daughter | La hija del maestro del puente | Matthew Leahy & Elisa Stone Leahy | Peru; United States |
| Prueba de fondo | | Oscar Bermeo & Christian Acuña | Peru |
| Las hijas de Nantu | | Willy Guevara | Peru |

==== Irresistible ====
Highlighted title indicates award winner.

| English Title | Original Title | Director(s) | Production Countrie(s) |
|---|---|---|---|
| La educación del rey | | Santiago Esteves | Argentina |
| Recreo | | Hernán Guerschuny & Jazmín Stuart | Argentina |
| The Future Ahead | El futuro que viene | Constanza Novick | Argentina |
| I Will Not Travel Hidden | No viajaré escondida | Pablo Zubizarreta | Argentina; Uruguay |
| The Movie of My Life | O Filme da Minha Vida | Selton Mello | Brazil |
| Just Like Our Parents | Como Nossos Pais | Laís Bodanzky | Brazil |
| Dry Martina | | Che Sandoval | Chile; Argentina |
| Damn Kids | Cabros de mierda | Gonzalo Justiniano | Chile |
| The Last Vedette | La última vedette | Edwin Oyarce | Chile |
| Virus Tropical | | Santiago Caicedo | Colombia |
| ¡Las Sandinistas! | | Jenny Murray | Nicaragua; United States |

=== Samples ===
==== Opening film ====
| English title | Original title | Director(s) | Production countrie(s) |
|---|---|---|---|
| Ruben Blades Is Not My Name | Yo no me llamo Rubén Blades | Abner Benaim | Panama |

==== Galas ====
A list of films selected for the 'Galas' lineup is as follows:

| English Title | Original Title | Director(s) | Production Countrie(s) |
|---|---|---|---|
| The Whole Year is Christmas | Todo el año es Navidad | Román Viñoly Barreto | Argentina |
| The Great Mystical Circus | O Grande Circo Místico | Carlos Diegues | Brazil |
| Praça Paris | | Lúcia Murat | Brazil |
| And Suddenly the Dawn | ...Y de pronto el amanecer | Silvio Caiozzi | Chile |
| 500 Years | | Pamela Yates | United States |
| The Teacher | Les Grands Esprits | Olivier Ayache-Vidal | France |
| Eternity Never Surrendered | No sucumbió la eternidad | Daniela Rea Gómez | Mexico |

==== 2018 Acclaimed ====
A list of films selected for the '2018 Acclaimed' lineup is as follows:

| English Title | Original Title | Director(s) | Production Countrie(s) |
|---|---|---|---|
| Transit | | Christian Petzold | Germany |
| The Captain | Der Hauptmann | Robert Schwentke | Germany |
| The Motive | El autor | Manuel Martín Cuenca | Spain |
| BlacKkKlansman | | Spike Lee | United States |
| The House by the Sea | La villa | Robert Guédiguian | France |
| Rainbow: A Private Affair | Una questione privata | Paolo and Vittorio Taviani | Italy |
| The Insult | قضية رقم ٢٣ | Ziad Doueiri | Lebanon |
| The Wild Pear Tree | Ahlat Ağacı | Nuri Bilge Ceylan | Turkey; Macedonia; France; Bosnia and Herzegovina; Bulgaria; Sweden |

==== Around the World in 8 Days ====
A list of films selected for the 'Around the World in 8 Days' lineup is as follows:

| English Title | Original Title | Director(s) | Production Countrie(s) |
|---|---|---|---|
| Central Airport THF | Zentralflughafen THF | Karim Aïnouz | Germany; France; Brazil |
| Animal | | Armando Bó | Argentina |
| Fisherman | Pescador | José Glusman | Argentina |
| My Best Friend | Mi mejor amigo | Martín Deus | Argentina |
| Sinfonía | | Gilbert Arroyo & Andrés Locatelli | Spain; Peru; Switzerland |
| Hacker | | Akan Satayev | United States |
| The Prayer | La prière | Cédric Kahn | France |
| Coexister | | Fabrice Eboué | France |
| Humboldt in Mexico: The Gaze of the Explorer | Humboldt en México: La mirada del explorador | Ana Cruz | Mexico |
| How to Talk to Girls at Parties | | John Cameron Mitchell | United Kingdom; United States |
| The Wife | | Björn Runge | Sweden |
| Pope Francis: A Man of His Word | | Wim Wenders | Switzerland; Vatican; Italy; Germany; France |

==== Searches ====
A list of films selected for the 'Searches' lineup is as follows:

| English Title | Original Title | Director(s) | Production Countrie(s) |
|---|---|---|---|
| Malambo, the Good Man | Malambo, el hombre bueno | Santiago Loza | Argentina |
| Recetas para microondas | | Matías Szulanski | Argentina |
| The Bed | La cama | Mónica Lairana | Argentina |
| The Endless Day | El día que resistía | Alessia Chiesa | Argentina |
| Princesita | | Marialy Rivas | Chile |
| Sal | | William Vega | Colombia |
| Chuquiragua | | Mateo Herrera | Ecuador |
| Yesterday Wonder I Was | Ayer maravilla fui | Gabriel Mariño | Mexico |

== Awards ==
=== In Competition ===
==== Fiction ====
- Trophy Spondylus: The Dead and the Others by João Salaviza & Renée Nader Messora
- Special Jury Prize: Los silencios by Beatriz Seigner
- Best Director: Ciro Guerra & Cristina Gallego for Birds of Passage
- Best Actress: Ana Brun for The Heiresses
- Best Actor: Sergio Prina for The Snatch Thief
- Best Screenplay: Beatriz Seigner for Los silencios
- Best Cinematography: Renée Nader Messora for The Dead and the Others
- Best Debut: The Heiresses by Marcelo Martinessi
  - Special Mention: We're All Sailors by Miguel Ángel Moulet

==== Documentary ====
- Trophy Spondylus: Silence Is a Falling Body by Agustina Comedi
  - Special Mention: The Search by Mariano Agudo & Daniel Lagares

=== International Critics ===
- International Critics' Jury Award for Best Film: Good Manners by Juliana Rojas & Marco Dutra
  - First Special Mention: The Heiresses by Marcelo Martinessi
  - Second Special Mention: Birds of Passage by Ciro Guerra & Cristina Gallego

=== Audience ===
- Audience Award for International Films: The Movie of My Life by Selton Mello
- Audience Award for National Films: Prueba de fondo by Oscar Bermeo & Christian Acuña

=== Other Awards ===
- Peruvian School of the Cinematographic Industry - EPIC Award: Hunting Season by Natalia Garagiola
- Cine del Mañana Work in Progress Award: Song Without a Name by Melina León
- Ministry of Culture Jury Award for Best Peruvian Film: Indigenous' Slayer by Oscar Sánchez Saldaña & Robert Julca Motta
  - Honorable Mention: Seeing Again by Judith Vélez
- National Institute of Consumer Defense and Intellectual Property Award - INDECOPI for Best Best Screenplay of a Peruvian Film in Fiction Competition: We're All Sailors by Miguel Angel Moulet
- APC Signis Peru - Monseñor Luciano Metzinger Communicators Association Award: Birds of Passage by Ciro Guerra & Cristina Gallego
- Peruvian Association of Film Press - APRECI Award for Best Film in Competition: The Heiresses by Marcelo Martinessi
