= 23rd Lima Film Festival =

2019 film festival

- Official poster of the 23rd Lima Film Festival
- Opening film: The Journey of Javier Heraud
- Location: Lima, Peru
- Founded: 1997
- Awards: Trophy Spondylus: Bacurau
- Directors: Marco Mühletaler
- Festival date: 9–17 August 2019
- Website: festivaldelima.com

Lima Film Festival
- 24th 22nd

The 23rd Lima Film Festival, organized by the Pontifical Catholic University of Peru, took place from 9 to 17 August 2019 in Lima, Peru. The awards were announced on 17 August 2019, with Bacurau winning the Trophy Spondylus.

== Background ==
In July 2019, the Lima Film Festival officially announced its 23rd edition, under the motto "Escape to the Festival" (Spanish: Escápate al Festival) The festival took place from Friday, August 9 to Saturday, August 17, 2019. Organized by the Pontifical Catholic University of Peru, through its Cultural Center, and presented in collaboration with the BBVA Foundation, the Ministry of Culture of Peru, the Gran Teatro Nacional del Perú, and El Comercio, tickets for the event went on sale from August 2, 2019, at the festival's official venues.

The festival welcomed back Ambulante for another year, a collective founded by Gael García Bernal, Diego Luna, Pablo Cruz, and Elena Fortes, dedicated to promoting documentary films to new audiences. In this edition, seven documentaries from different countries were showcased. The film documentary The Journey of Javier Heraud by Javier Corcuera served as the opening film, which took place at the Gran Teatro Nacional.

The event paid tribute to the careers of three individuals: French filmmaker Claire Denis, Bolivian documentarian Jorge Sanjinés, and the production group Grupo Ukamau on their 25th anniversary. Marianne Eyde and Mikael Wiström were the directors who received recognition for their careers. Additionally, Mexican actor Gael García Bernal visited the festival to present Chicuarotes, his second film as a director, and also conducted an open masterclass for the general public on Sunday, August 11.

== Juries ==
=== In Competition ===
==== Fiction ====
- Laura Imperiale, Mexican producer - Jury President
- Beatriz Seigner, Brazilian filmmaker
- Estrella Araiza, Mexican cultural manager
- Marcelo Martinessi, Paraguayan filmmaker
- Miguel Ángel Moulet, Peruvian filmmaker

==== Documentary ====
- Daniela Alatorre, Mexican producer - Jury President
- Agustina Comedi, Argentine filmmaker
- Fabiola Sialer, Peruvian editor

=== International Critics ===
- Gisella Barthé - Jury President
- Marcela Gamberini
- Claudio Sánchez

== Official Selection ==
The lineup of titles selected for the official selection include:

=== In Competition ===
==== Fiction ====
Highlighted title indicates award winner.

English Title	Original Title	Director(s)	Production Country
Florianópolis Dream	Sueño Florianópolis	Ana Katz	Argentina; Brazil
A Family Submerged	Familia sumergida	María Alché	Argentina; Brazil; Germany; Norway
Bacurau		Kleber Mendonça Filho & Juliano Dornelles	Brazil; France
The Invisible Life of Eurídice Gusmão	A vida invisível	Karim Aïnouz	Brazil; Germany
Sick, Sick, Sick	Sem seu sangue	Alice Furtado	Brazil; France; Holland
Sócrates		Alexandre Moratto	Brazil
Enigma		Ignacio Juricic	Chile
Monos		Alejandro Landes	Colombia; Argentina; Netherlands; Germany; Sweden; Uruguay
Litigante		Franco Lolli	Colombia; France
Land of Ashes	Ceniza negra	Sofía Quirós Ubeda	Costa Rica; Argentina; Chile; France
Our Mothers	Nuestras madres	César Díaz	Guatemala; France; Belgium
José		Li Cheng	Guatemala; United States
The Chambermaid	La camarista	Lila Avilés	Mexico; United States
The Good Girls	Las niñas bien	Alejandra Márquez Abella	Mexico
Song Without a Name	Canción sin nombre	Melina León	Peru; Spain; United States
The Clash	La bronca	Daniel Vega & Diego Vega	Peru
Miriam Lies	Miriam miente	Natalia Cabral & Oriol Estrada	Dominican Republic; Spain
The Sharks	Los tiburones	Lucía Garibaldi	Uruguay; Argentina; Spain

==== Documentary ====
Highlighted title indicates award winner.

English Title	Original Title	Director(s)	Production Countrie(s)
Ausencia de mí		Melina Terribili	Argentina; Uruguay
The Faculties	Las facultades	Eloísa Solaas	Argentina
Summer Days	Días de temporada	Pablo Stigliani	Argentina
Let It Burn	Diz a ela que me viu chorar	Maíra Bühler	Brazil
Lemebel		Joanna Reposi Garibaldi	Chile; Colombia
Los sueños del castillo		René Ballesteros	Chile; France
La paz		Tomás Pinzón Lucena	Colombia
A Wild Stream	Una corriente salvaje	Nuria Ibañez	Mexico
O amor é único		Marina Meijer	Netherlands; Brazil
By the Name of Tania		Mary Jiménez & Bénédicte Liénard	Peru; Belgium; Netherlands
The Revolution and the Land	La revolución y la tierra	Gonzalo Benavente Secco	Peru

==== Made in Peru ====
Space dedicated to showcasing Peruvian films in their absolute premiere. Both this section and the 'Irresistible' section competed for the Audience Award.

Highlighted title indicates award winner.

English Title	Original Title	Director(s)	Production Countrie(s)
In the Middle of the Labyrinth	En medio del laberinto	Salomón Pérez	Peru
La cantera		Miguel Barreda Delgado	Peru
Mapacho		Carlos Marín Tello	Peru
Hugo Blanco, Deep River	Hugo Blanco, río profundo	Malena Martínez Cabrera	Peru
Mi Barrios Altos Querido		Jimmy Valdivieso	Peru
Máxima		Claudia Sparrow	Peru; United States
Yutupis		Luis Pizarro Pérez	Peru; Belgium

==== Irresistible ====
Latin American films for all tastes that you won't want to miss. Both this section and the 'Made in Peru' section competed for the Audience Award.

English Title	Original Title	Director(s)	Production Countrie(s)
Rojo		Benjamín Naishtat	Argentina; Belgium; Brazil; Germany; France; Switzerland
Aire		Arturo Castro Godoy	Argentina
Método Livingston		Sofía Mora	Argentina
Divine Love	Divino amor	Gabriel Mascaro	Brazil; Uruguay; Denmark
Domingo		Clara Linhart & Fellipe Barbosa	Brazil; France
La venganza de Jairo		Simón Hernández	Colombia; Mexico
The Awakening of the Ants	El despertar de las hormigas	Antonella Sudasassi	Costa Rica; Spain
Leona		Isaac Cherem	Mexico
This Is Not Berlin	Esto no es Berlín	Hari Sama	Mexico
Midnight Family	Familia de medianoche	Luke Lorentzen	Mexico; United States
Long Distance	Larga distancia	Franco Finocchiaro	Peru

=== Samples ===
==== Opening film ====
English title	Original title	Director(s)	Production countrie(s)
The Journey of Javier Heraud		Javier Corcuera	Peru; Spain

==== Searches ====
Films in which the author's freedom of exploration triumphs over the use of more conventional narratives. A list of films selected for the 'Searches' lineup is as follows:

English Title	Original Title	Director(s)	Production Countrie(s)
Brief Story from the Green Planet	Breve historia del planeta verde	Santiago Loza	Argentina; Germany; Brazil; Spain
Silvia		María Silvia Esteve	Argentina
Soft Rains Will Come	Vendrán lluvias suaves	Iván Fund	Argentina
Lapü		César Alejandro Jaimes & Juan Pablo Polanco	Colombia
Vida a bordo		Emiliano Mazza De Luca	Uruguay

==== 2019 Acclaimed ====
The most highly anticipated auteur cinema of the past year worldwide: Cannes, Berlin, San Sebastián. A list of films selected for the '2019 Acclaimed' lineup is as follows:

English Title	Original Title	Director(s)	Production Countrie(s)
Young Ahmed	Le jeune Ahmed	Jean-Pierre & Luc Dardenne	Belgium; France
The Wild Goose Lake	南方车站的聚会	Diao Yinan	China; France
The Realm	El reino	Rodrigo Sorogoyen	Spain; France
Once Upon a Time in Hollywood		Quentin Tarantino	United States
By the Grace of God	Grâce à Dieu	François Ozon	France
Varda by Agnès	Varda par Agnès	Agnès Varda	France
Joan of Arc	Jeanne	Bruno Dumont	France
It Must Be Heaven		Elia Suleiman	France; Qatar; Germany; Canada; Turkey; Palestine
Oh Mercy!	Roubaix, une lumière	Arnaud Desplechin	France
Beanpole	Дылда	Kantemir Balagov	Russia

==== Pride and Prejudice ====
Stories of diversity and gender-based violence. A list of films selected for the 'Pride and Prejudice' lineup is as follows:

English Title	Original Title	Director(s)	Production Countrie(s)
Let It Be Law	Que sea ley	Juan Solanas	Argentina
Greta		Armando Praça	Brazil
A Thousand Women	As mil mulheres	Rita Toledo	Brazil
Cachada: The Opportunity	Cachada	Marlén Viñayo	El Salvador
Niña sola		Javier Ávila	Mexico
One Taxi Ride	Un viaje en taxi	Mak CK	Mexico; Singapore

==== Galas ====
Works starring or created by artists with a great trajectory. A list of films selected for the 'Galas' lineup is as follows:

English Title	Original Title	Director(s)	Production Countrie(s)
Men of Hard Skin	Hombres de piel dura	José Celestino Campusano	Argentina
El Pepe: A Supreme Life	El Pepe, una vida suprema	Emir Kusturica	Argentina; Uruguay
Joel		Carlos Sorín	Argentina
Introduzione all'oscuro		Gastón Solnicki	Argentina; Austria
Mario y los perros		Chema de la Peña	Spain
¡He matado a mi marido!		Francisco Lupini Basagoiti	United States
Santiago, Italia		Nanni Moretti	Italy; France; Chile
Chicuarotes		Gael García Bernal	Mexico
Buddy		Heddy Honigmann	Netherlands; Peru
Fallen from Heaven	Caídos del cielo	Francisco Lombardi	Peru
Defiant Souls	Insumisas	Fernando Pérez & Laura Cazador	Switzerland; Cuba
Madame Cinéma		Jonathan Reverón	Venezuela

==== Around the World in 8 Days ====
A tour of the international billboard, prioritizing those films that will soon be released in Lima. A list of films selected for the 'Around the World in 8 Days' lineup is as follows:

English Title	Original Title	Director(s)	Production Countrie(s)
Delfín		Gaspar Scheuer	Argentina
The Nightshifter	Morto Não Fala	Dennison Ramalho	Brazil
The Guilty	Den skyldige	Gustav Möller	Denmark
Teen Spirit		Max Minghella	United States
Remi, Nobody's Boy	Rémi sans famille	Antoine Blossier	France
Rolling to You	Tout le monde debout	Franck Dubosc	France
The Ash Lad: In the Hall of the Mountain King	Askeladden - I Dovregubbens Hall	Mikkel Brænne Sandemose	Norway
Yesterday		Danny Boyle	United Kingdom; United States
Blinded by the Light		Gurinder Chadha	United Kingdom
King of Thieves		James Marsh	United Kingdom

== Awards ==
=== In Competition ===
==== Fiction ====
- Trophy Spondylus: Bacurau by Kleber Mendonça Filho & Juliano Dornelles
- Special Jury Prize: Song Without a Name by Melina León
- Best Director: Kleber Mendonça Filho & Juliano Dornelles for Bacurau
- Best Actress: Ilse Salas for The Good Girls
  - Honorable Mention: Pamela Mendoza for Song Without a Name
- Best Actor: Rodrigo Palacios for La bronca
- Best Screenplay: María Alché for A Family Submerged
- Best Cinematography: Helene Louvart for The Invisible Life of Eurídice Gusmão
- Best Debut: The Chambermaid by Lila Avilés
  - Special Mention: The Sharks by Lucía Garibaldi

==== Documentary ====
- Trophy Spondylus: La paz by Tomás Pinzón Lucena
  - Special Mention: Lemebel by Joanna Reposi Garibaldi

=== International Critics ===
- International Critics' Jury Award for Best Film: Bacurau by Kleber Mendonça Filho & Juliano Dornelles
  - First Special Mention: The Chambermaid by Lila Avilés
  - Second Special Mention: A Family Submerged by María Alché

=== Audience ===
- Audience Award for International Films: The Invisible Life of Eurídice Gusmão by Karim Aïnouz
- Audience Award for National Films: Máxima by Claudia Sparrow

=== Other Awards ===
- Ministry of Culture Jury Award for Best Peruvian Film: Song Without a Name by Melina León
  - First Honorable Mention: The Revolution and the Land by Gonzalo Benavente Secco
  - Second Honorable Mention: La cantera by Miguel Barreda Delgado
  - Third Honorable Mention: La bronca by Daniel & Diego Vega
- National Institute of Consumer Defense and Intellectual Property Award - INDECOPI for Best Screenplay of a Peruvian Film participating in the competition sections of Fiction, Documentary, Made in Peru, and Irresistible: Song Without a Name by Melina León
- APC Signis Peru - Monseñor Luciano Metzinger Communicators Association Award: The Invisible Life of Eurídice Gusmão by Karim Aïnouz
- Peruvian Association of Film Press - APRECI Award for Best Film in Competition: La bronca by Daniel & Diego Vega
  - Honorable Mention: The Invisible Life of Eurídice Gusmão by Karim Aïnouz
