= 26th Lima Film Festival =

2022 film festival

- Official poster of the 26th Lima Film Festival inspired by the film Rocanrol 68
- Opening film: Mirlo's Dance
- Location: Lima, Peru
- Founded: 1997
- Awards: Trophy Spondylus: Dusk Stone
- Directors: Marco Mühletaler
- Festival date: 4–12 August 2022
- Website: festivaldelima.com

Lima Film Festival
- 27th 25th

The 26th Lima Film Festival, organized by the Pontifical Catholic University of Peru, took place from 4 to 12 August 2022 in Lima, Peru. The awards were announced on 12 August 2022, with Dusk Stone winning the Trophy Spondylus.

== Background ==
On July 6, 2023, the Lima Film Festival officially announced its 26th edition under the motto "#CinemaBringsUsTogether" (Spanish: #ElCineNosReúne). The festival was held from August 4 to 12, 2022, with in-person and virtual screenings. Organized by the Pontifical Catholic University of Peru and presented by the BBVA Foundation in Peru, the Ministry of Culture of Peru, the Gran Teatro Nacional del Perú, the event aimed to celebrate the vibrant world of cinema in the Lima capital. The full schedule and ticket sales were made available as of July 25, 2022. In June 2023, tributes to the careers of actresses Yvonne Frayssinet and Mercedes Morán, along with sound technician Francisco Adrianzén, were announced.

The documentary film Mirlo's Dance by Álvaro Luque opened the festival as the opening film, screened out of competition. Following the screening, the band performed a live concert for the audience at the Gran Teatro Nacional.

== Juries ==
=== In Competition ===
==== Fiction ====
- Clarisa Navas, Argentine filmmaker - Jury President
- Blanca Lewin, Chilean actress
- Henry Vallejo, Peruvian filmmaker
- Fernando E. Juan Lima, Argentine lawyer
- Piedad Bonnett, Colombian poet

==== Fiction Cinematography ====
- Claudia Becerril, Mexican cinematographer - Jury President
- Pili Flores-Guerra, Peruvian cinematographer
- Hugo Colace, Argentine cinematographer

==== Documentary ====
- Coraci Ruiz, Brazilian filmmaker - Jury President
- Natalia Garayalde, Argentine filmmaker
- Diego Sarmiento, Peruvian filmmaker

=== International Critics ===
- Katherine Subirana, Peruvian journalist - Jury President
- Diego Batlle, Argentine journalist and critic
- Mary Carmen Molina Ergueta, Bolivian researcher in literature and cinema

=== PUCP Community ===
- Mónica Bonifaz - Jury President
- Musa Casas
- Arlem Quevedo
- Joseph Reyes
- Leonardo Torres

=== Ministry of Culture of Peru ===
- Laura Isabel Martínez Silva
- Jean Carlos Alcócer Palacios
- Carlos Manuel Bambarén Guzmán

=== International Labour Organization - CINETRAB ===
- Alfredo Villavicencio
- Teresa Torres
- Manuel Siles

=== Peruvian Association of Film Press - APRECI ===
- José Romero Carrillo
- Sofía Álvarez
- Zoraida Rengifo del Prado

=== Monseñor Luciano Metzinger Communicators Association - APC Signis Peru ===
- Rocío Mendoza Vásquez
- Fernando Ruiz Vallejos
- Mónica Villanueva Galdós

=== Chronicles of Diversity ===
- Rolando Salazar
- Arturo Dávila
- Vitalia Saravia

== Official Selection ==
The lineup of titles selected for the official selection include:

=== In Competition ===
==== Fiction ====
Highlighted title indicates award winner.

English Title	Original Title	Director(s)	Production Countrie(s)
1976		Manuela Martelli	Chile; Argentina; Qatar
The Box	La caja	Lorenzo Vigas	Mexico; United States
Carajita		Silvina Schnicer & Ulises Porra	Dominican Republic; Argentina
Domingo and the Mist	Domingo y la niebla	Ariel Escalante Meza	Costa Rica; Qatar
Dusk Stone	Piedra noche	Iván Fund	Argentina; Chile; Spain
Eami		Paz Encina	Paraguay; Argentina; Mexico; Germany; France; Netherlands; United States
The Great Movement	El gran movimiento	Kiro Russo	Bolivia; France; Qatar; Switzerland
Hilda's Short Summer	Las vacaciones de Hilda	Agustín Banchero	Uruguay; Brazil
Immersion	Inmersión	Nicolás Postiglione	Chile; Mexico
The Invisible Girl	La pampa	Dorian Fernández-Moris	Peru; Spain; Chile
A Male	Un varón	Fabián Hernández	Colombia
Medusa		Anita Rocha da Silveira	Brazil
The Shape of Things to Come	Tiempos futuros	Victor Manuel Checa	Peru; Mexico; Ecuador; Spain; Germany
To Kill the Beast	Matar a la bestia	Agustina San Martín	Argentina; Brazil; Chile
The Visitor	El visitante	Martín Boulocq	Bolivia; Uruguay

==== Documentary ====
Highlighted title indicates award winner.

English Title	Original Title	Director(s)	Production Countrie(s)
Alis		Clare Weiskopf & Nicolas van Hemelryck	Colombia; Romania; Chile
The Beach of Enchaquirados	La playa de los enchaquirados	Iván Mora Manzano	Ecuador
Danubio		Agustina Pérez Rial	Argentina
Delia		Victoria Pena	Uruguay
For Your Peace of Mind, Make Your Own Museum	Para su tranquilidad, haga su propio museo	Pilar Moreno & Ana Endara	Panama
The Hostilities	Las hostilidades	M. Sebastián Molina	Mexico
Ironland	Lavra	Lucas Bambozzi	Brazil
Letters From a Distance	Cartas a distancia	Juan Carlos Rulfo	Mexico
The National High School	El Nacional	Alejandro Hartmann	Argentina
Pakucha		Tito Catacora	Peru

==== Made in Peru ====
Space dedicated to showcasing Peruvian films in their absolute premiere.

Highlighted title indicates award winner.

English title	Original title	Director(s)	Production countrie(s)
Antonia	Antonia en la vida	Natalia Rojas Gamarra	Peru
Bantamweight	Peso gallo	Hans Matos Cámac	Peru
The Captives	Las cautivas	Natalia Maysundo	Peru; Chile
Willaq Pirqa, the Cinema of My Village	Willaq Pirqa, el cine de mi pueblo	César Galindo	Peru; Bolivia
Winds & Memories	Vientos & Memorias	Heeder Soto	Peru; Germany

=== Samples ===
==== Opening film ====
English title	Original title	Director(s)	Production countrie(s)
Mirlo's Dance	La danza de los Mirlos	Álvaro Luque	Peru

==== Acclaimed ====
The most highly anticipated auteur cinema of the past year worldwide: Málaga, Cannes, Berlin. A list of films selected for the 'Acclaimed' lineup is as follows:

English title	Original title	Director(s)	Production countrie(s)
Alcarràs		Carla Simón	Spain; Italy
Ali & Ava		Clio Barnard	United Kingdom
A Chiara		Jonas Carpignano	Italy; United States
Close		Lukas Dhont	Belgium; France; Netherlands
Hit the Road	جاده خاکی	Panah Panahi	Iran
Holy Spider		Ali Abbasi	Denmark; Sweden; France; Germany
Lullaby	Cinco lobitos	Alauda Ruiz de Azúa	Spain
Memoria		Apichatpong Weerasethakul	Colombia; France; Germany; Mexico; Thailand; United Kingdom

==== Galas ====
Works starring or created by highly acclaimed Latin American artists. A list of films selected for the 'Galas' lineup is as follows:

English title	Original title	Director(s)	Production countrie(s)
Blooming on the Asphalt	Germino pétalas no asfalto	Coraci Ruiz & Julio Matos	Brazil; United Kingdom
La decisión de Amelia		Francisco Lombardi	Peru
Huesera: The Bone Woman	Huesera	Michelle Garza Cervera	Mexico; Peru
Mensajes privados		Matías Bize	Chile
No somos nada		Javier Corcuera	Spain; Peru
Plaza Catedral		Abner Benaim	Panama
Trilogía muda		Daniel Rodríguez Risco	Peru; Argentina
Territory	Wändari	Daniel Lagares & Mariano Agudo	Peru
Utama		Alejandro Loayza Grisi	Bolivia; Uruguay; France

== Awards ==
=== In Competition ===
==== Fiction ====
- Trophy Spondylus: Dusk Stone by Iván Fund
- Special Jury Prize: A Male by Fabián Hernández
  - Honorable Mention: Hilda's Short Summer by Agustín Banchero
- Best Director: Kiro Russo for The Great Movement
- Best Actress: Aline Küppenheim for 1976
- Best Actor: Dylan Felipe Ramírez for A Male
- Best Screenplay: Martín Boulocq & Rodrigo Hasbún for The Visitor
- Best Debut: 1976 by Manuela Martelli
- Best Cinematography: Sofía Oggioni for A Male
  - First Honorable Mention: Pablo Paniagua for The Great Movement
  - Second Honorable Mention: Sergio Armstrong for Immersion

==== Documentary ====
- Trophy Spondylus: Pakucha by Tito Catacora
  - First Honorable Mention: Danubio by Agustina Pérez Rial
  - Second Honorable Mention: The Hostilities by M. Sebastián Molina

==== Made in Peru ====
- PUCP Community Award for Made in Peru Best Film: Willaq Pirqa, the Cinema of My Village by César Galindo
  - Honorable Mention: Bantamweight by Hans Matos Cámac

=== Other Awards ===
- International Critics Award: A Male by Fabián Hernández
  - Honorable Mention: Medusa by Anita Rocha da Silveira & The Great Movement by Kiro Russo
- Audience Award: Willaq Pirqa, the Cinema of My Village by César Galindo
- Ministry of Culture Jury Award for Best Peruvian Film: Willaq Pirqa, the Cinema of My Village by César Galindo
  - Honorable Mention: Pakucha by Tito Catacora
- International Labour Organization – CINETRAB Award for Best Fiction: The Great Movement by Kiro Russo
- International Labour Organization – CINETRAB Award for Best Documentary: Letters From a Distance by Juan Carlos Rulfo
- Peruvian Association of Film Press - APRECI Award for Best Film in Competition: 1976 by Manuela Martelli
- APC Signis Peru - Monseñor Luciano Metzinger Communicators Association Award: Medusa by Anita Rocha da Silveira
- Gio Award: The Beach of Enchaquirados by Iván Mora Manzano
