= 27th Lima Film Festival =

2023 film festival

- Official poster of the 27th Lima Film Festival
- Opening film: The Green Wall
- Location: Lima, Peru
- Founded: 1997
- Awards: Trophy Spondylus: Tótem
- Directors: Marco Mühletaler
- Festival date: 10–18 August 2023
- Website: festivaldelima.com

Lima Film Festival
- 28th 26th

The 27th Lima Film Festival, organized by the Pontifical Catholic University of Peru, took place from 10–18 August 2023 in Lima, Peru. The awards were announced on 18 August 2023, with Tótem winning the Trophy Spondylus.

== Background ==
On June 27, 2023, the Lima Film Festival officially announced its 27th edition under the motto "#LetsBeProtagonists" (Spanish: #SeamosProtagonistas). The festival took place from August 10 to 18, 2023, featuring both in-person and virtual screenings. Organized by the Pontifical Catholic University of Peru and presented by the BBVA Foundation in Peru, the Ministry of Culture of Peru, the Gran Teatro Nacional del Perú, and in collaboration with PromPerú, the complete programming and ticket sales were available starting from July 25, 2023.

In its 27th edition, the film festival paid tribute to the careers of five distinguished personalities: Argentine filmmaker Lita Stantic, Peruvian actor Hernán Romero, Spanish film producer Esther García, French filmmaker Leos Carax, and the BBVA Foundation for its 50th anniversary. On August 8, 2023, a surprise screening for the film The Monroy Affaire (Spanish: El caso Monroy) scheduled to take place on August 17, 2023, was announced, along with a talk featuring the film's director and artistic director of the festival, Josué Méndez, and its protagonist, the Mexican actor Damián Alcázar, on August 18, 2023.

== Juries ==
=== In Competition ===
==== Fiction ====
- Maria Carlota Bruno, Brazilian producer - Jury President
- Iván Fund, Argentine filmmaker
- Claudio Pereira, Chilean film teacher
- Melania Urbina, Peruvian actress

==== Fiction Cinematography ====
- Micaela Cajahuaringa, Peruvian cinematographer - Jury President
- Mustapha Barat, Brazilian cinematographer
- Sergio Armstrong, Chilean cinematographer

==== Documentary ====
- Agustina Pérez Rial, Argentine film producer - Jury President
- Tito Catacora, Peruvian filmmaker
- Inti Cordera, Mexican filmmaker

=== International Critics ===
- Leny Fernández, Peruvian film critic
- Diego Brodersen, Argentine film critic
- Denise Tavares, Brazilian teacher and researcher

=== PUCP Community ===
- Maricielo Chilquillo Zuñiga
- Renata Fernández
- Alessandro Zevallos Fajardo
- Carmen Toledo Larios
- Francisco Rumiche Zapata

=== Ministry of Culture of Peru ===
- Tania Medina Caro
- Juan Carlos Oganes Oblitas
- Alberto Castro

=== Peruvian Association of Film Press - APRECI ===
- Alejandra Bernedo - Jury President
- Omar Cáceres
- Dixia Morales

=== Monseñor Luciano Metzinger Communicators Association - APC Signis Peru ===
- Marjorie Reffray Vílchez - Jury President
- José Antonio Ulloa Cueva
- Javier Portocarrero Grados

=== International Labour Organization - CINETRAB ===
- Manuel Siles - Jury President
- Luis González Gómez de Aranda
- Carmen Esther Benitez Gambirazio

=== Chronicles of Diversity ===
- Gia Lujuria - Jury President
- Alvaro Acosta
- Ana Karina Barandiarán

=== Association of Female Film Directors of Peru - NUNA ===
- Rocío Lladó
- Joanna Lombardi
- Marité Ugás

=== Creativity and Arts School - ECRAN ===
- Gisella Ramírez
- Daniel Vega
- Gonzalo Otero

== Official Selection ==
The lineup of titles selected for the official selection include:

=== In Competition ===
==== Fiction ====
Highlighted title indicates award winner.

English Title	Original Title	Director(s)	Production Countrie(s)
The Punishment	El castigo	Matías Bize	Chile; Argentina
I Have Electric Dreams	Tengo sueños eléctricos	Valentina Maurel	Costa Rica; Belgium; France
Diógenes		Leonardo Barbuy	Peru; France; Colombia
Shipibos Stories	Historias de shipibos	Omar Forero	Peru
Yana-Wara		Tito Catacora & Óscar Catacora	Peru
The Buriti Flower	Crowrã	João Salaviza & Renée Nader	Brazil; Portugal
Lost In the Night	Perdidos en la noche	Amat Escalante	Mexico; Germany; Netherlands; Denmark
The Erection of Toribio Bardelli	La erección de Toribio Bardelli	Adrián Saba	Peru; Brazil
Tótem		Lila Avilés	Mexico; Denmark; France
Eureka		Lisandro Alonso	Argentina; Mexico; Germany; Portugal; France
Memento mori		Fernando López Cardona	Colombia; Germany
Sister & Sister	Las hijas	Kattia G. Zúñiga	Panama; Chile
The Delinquents	Los delincuentes	Rodrigo Moreno	Argentina; Brazil; Chile; Luxembourg
The Barbarians	La barbarie	Andrew Sala	Argentina; France
Daughter of Rage	La hija de todas las rabias	Laura Baumeister	Nicaragua; Mexico; Netherlands; Germany; France; Norway; Spain
The Settlers	Los colonos	Felipe Gálvez	Chile; Argentina; United Kingdom; Taiwan; France; Denmark; Sweden; Germany

==== Documentary ====
Highlighted title indicates award winner.

English Title	Original Title	Director(s)	Production Countrie(s)
The Eternal Memory	La memoria infinita	Maite Alberdi	Chile
Pictures of Ghosts	Retratos fantasmas	Kleber Mendonça Filho	Brazil
Classroom 8	Aula 8	Héctor Gálvez	Peru
The Padilla Affair	El caso Padilla	Pavel Giroud	Cuba; Spain
A Wolfpack Called Ernesto	Una jauría llamada Ernesto	Everardo González	Mexico; France; Switzerland
The Echo	El eco	Tatiana Huezo	Mexico; Germany
The Trial	El juicio	Ulises de la Orden	Argentina; Italy; France; Norway
Guapo'y		Sofía Paoli Thorne	Paraguay; Argentina; Qatar
Loving Martha	Amando a Martha	Daniela López Osorio	Colombia; Argentina
Transfariana		Joris Lachaise	Colombia; France
The Castle	El castillo	Martín Benchimol	Argentina; France

==== Made in Peru ====
Space dedicated to showcasing Peruvian films in their absolute premiere.

Highlighted title indicates award winner.

English title	Original title	Director(s)	Production countrie(s)
Tayta Shanti		Hans Matos Cámac	Peru
Reinaldo Cutipa		Oscar Gonzales Apaza	Peru
The Last Laugh	Muerto de risa	Gonzalo Ladines	Peru
Islandia		Ina Mayushin	Peru
Amazon Sound	Sonido amazónico	Luis A. Chumbe	Peru
Open-Pit	Cielo abierto	Felipe Esparza	Peru; France
Deep Red	Rojo profundo	Maga Zevallos	Peru

=== Samples ===
==== Opening film ====
English title	Original title	Director(s)	Production countrie(s)
The Green Wall	La muralla verde	Armando Robles Godoy	Peru

==== Acclaimed ====
The most highly anticipated auteur cinema on a worldwide level: Cannes, Berlin, Sundance. A list of films selected for the 'Acclaimed' lineup is as follows:

English title	Original title	Director(s)	Production countrie(s)
Corsage		Marie Kreutzer	Austria; Luxembourg; Germany; France
Passages		Ira Sachs	France
The Sitting Duck	La syndicaliste	Jean-Paul Salomé	France
Houria		Mounia Meddour	Algeria; France
20,000 Species of Bees	20.000 especies de abejas	Estibaliz Urresola Solaguren	Spain
Strange Way of Life	Extraña forma de vida	Pedro Almodóvar	Spain
Asteroid City		Wes Anderson	United States
About Dry Grasses	Kuru Otlar Üstüne	Nuri Bilge Ceylan	Turkey; France; Germany; Sweden
Fallen Leaves	Kuolleet lehdet	Aki Kaurismäki	Finland; Germany
Perfect Days		Wim Wenders	Japan
A Brighter Tomorrow	Il sol dell'avvenire	Nanni Moretti	Italy; France
Anatomy of a Fall	Anatomie d'une chute	Justine Triet	France

==== Galas ====
Works starring or created by highly relevant artists. A list of films selected for the 'Galas' lineup is as follows:

English title	Original title	Director(s)	Production countrie(s)
Nosari: Impermanent Eternity	Nosari no shima	Tatsuya Yamamoto	Japan
The House of Snails	La casa del caracol	Macarena Astorga	Spain; Peru; Mexico
Babygirl	La hembrita	Laura Amelia Guzmán	Dominican Republic
Virgilio		Alfred Oliveri	Argentina; Uruguay
The Messenger	O mensageiro	Lúcia Murat	Brazil; Argentina
The Most Feared Skin	La piel más temida	Joel Calero	Peru; Colombia

== Awards ==
=== In Competition ===
==== Fiction ====
- Trophy Spondylus: Tótem by Lila Avilés
  - Honorable Mention: Shipibos Stories by Omar Forero
- Special Jury Prize: Eureka by Lisandro Alonso
- Best Director: Rodrigo Moreno for The Delinquents
- Best Actress: Antonia Zegers for The Punishment
- Best Actor: Marcelo Subiotto for The Barbarians
- Best Screenplay: Felipe Gálvez and Antonia Girardi for The Settlers
- Best Debut: I Have Electric Dreams by Valentina Maurel

==== Fiction Cinematography ====
- Best Cinematography: Diego Tenorio for Tótem
  - Honorable Mention: Andrés Felipe Morales for Memento mori

==== Documentary ====
- Trophy Spondylus: Pictures of Ghosts by Kleber Mendonça Filho
  - Special Mention: The Trial by Ulises de la Orden

==== International Critics ====
- International Critics' Jury Award for Best Film: The Delinquents by Rodrigo Moreno
  - First Honorable Mention: Eureka by Lisandro Alonso
  - Second Honorable Mention: Shipibos Stories by Omar Forero

==== Audience ====
- Audience Award for the Best Voted Film from the Fiction, Documentary, and Made in Peru sections: Rojo profundo by Maga Zevallos

==== PUCP Community ====
- PUCP Community Award for Made in Peru Best Film: Islandia by Ina Mayushin
  - Honorable Mention: Rojo profundo by Maga Zevallos

=== Other Awards ===
- Ministry of Culture Jury Award for Best Peruvian Film: Open-Pit by Felipe Esparza
  - First Honorable Mention: Yana-Wara by Tito Catacora & Óscar Catacora
  - Second Honorable Mention: Rojo profundo by Maga Zevallos
- International Labour Organization – CINETRAB Award for Best Fiction: Open-Pit by Felipe Esparza
- International Labour Organization – CINETRAB Award for Best Documentary: The Echo by Tatiana Huezo
- Peruvian Association of Film Press - APRECI Award for Best Film in Competition: The Settlers by Felipe Gálvez
  - Honorable Mention: The Delinquents by Rodrigo Moreno
- APC Signis Peru - Monseñor Luciano Metzinger Communicators Association Award: The Buriti Flower by João Salaviza & Renée Nader
- Gio Award: Transfariana by Joris Lachaise
- ECRAN Award: Valentina Maurel for I Have Electric Dreams
- NUNA Award: Valentina Maurel for I Have Electric Dreams
