= Dusk Stone =

2021 film

- Directed by: Iván Fund
- Screenplay by: Martín Felipe Castagnet; Iván Fund; Santiago Loza
- Produced by: Laura Mara Tablón
- Starring: Maricel Álvarez; Mara Bestelli; Alfredo Castro; Marcelo Subiotto; Jeremías Kuharo
- Cinematography: Gustavo Schiaffino
- Edited by: Lorena Moriconi
- Music by: Francisco Cerda
- Release date: 2021
- Running time: 87 minutes
- Language: Spanish

Dusk Stone (Spanish: Piedra noche) is a 2021 drama film co-written and directed by Iván Fund.

A co-production between Argentina, Chile and Spain, the film premiered at the 78th edition of the Venice Film Festival, in the Giornate degli Autori sidebar. It was awarded best film at the 2022 Lima Film Festival.

== Cast ==
- Maricel Álvarez as Sina
- Mara Bestelli as Greta
- Alfredo Castro as Genaro
- Marcelo Subiotto as Bruno
- Jeremías Kuharo as Denis

== Reception ==
On the review aggregator website Rotten Tomatoes, 80% of 5 critics' reviews are positive, with an average rating of 7.30/10.
