= Seeing Again =

Volver a ver
- Promotional release poster
- Directed by: Judith Vélez
- Written by: Judith Vélez
- Cinematography: Marco Arauco
- Music by: Tomás Gistau Soldi
- Production companies: Nómade Films; La Mula Producciones
- Release date: November 7, 2018
- Running time: 90 minutes
- Country: Peru
- Language: Spanish

Seeing Again (Spanish: Volver a ver) is a 2018 Peruvian documentary film written and directed by Judith Vélez. It was released in commercial theaters on November 7, 2018. The film was selected as the Peruvian representative to compete in the Best Ibero-American Film category at the 35th Goya Awards, but was not nominated.

== Synopsis ==
The documentary that narrates the return of photojournalists Vera Lentz, Óscar Medrano and Alejandro Balaguer to Ayacucho, a region that was severely punished in the 1980s during the years of the internal armed conflict in Peru, and their reunion with the people they portrayed.

== Awards ==
Year	Award	Country	Category	Result	Ref.
2018	22nd Lima Film Festival	Peru	Best Peruvian Film - Honorable Mention	Won	
