= La decisión de Amelia =

- Theatrical release poster
- Directed by: Francisco José Lombardi
- Written by: Francisco José Lombardi
- Produced by: Gustavo Sánchez
- Starring: Mayella Lloclla; Gustavo Bueno
- Cinematography: Pili Flores Guerra
- Edited by: Eric Williams
- Production company: La Soga Producciones
- Release dates: August 6, 2022 (Lima); August 31, 2023 (Peru)
- Running time: 96 minutes
- Country: Peru
- Language: Spanish

La decisión de Amelia (lit. 'Amelia's decision') is a 2022 Peruvian drama film written and directed by Francisco José Lombardi. It stars Mayella Lloclla and Gustavo Bueno accompanied by Paul Vega, Stephany Orúe and Haydeé Cáceres. It is about a humble young nurse and a bitter and authoritarian rich old man whose lives will change when they meet.

== Synopsis ==
Amelia is a young nurse who can't find work; Cecilia, her best friend, proposes that she work taking care of an elderly, racist, classist and impatient millionaire named Víctor. However, the old man's temperament and life will change over time. For her part, Amelia will have to make a difficult decision regarding her new patient.

== Cast ==
- Mayella Lloclla as Amelia
- Gustavo Bueno as Víctor
- Stephany Orúe as Cecilia
- Martin Martinez as Ricardo
- Haydeé Cáceres as Housekeeper
- Paul Vega

== Production ==
Principal photography began on December 3, 2018, in Peru.

== Release ==
La decisión de Amelia had its world premiere on August 6, 2022, at the 26th Lima Film Festival. It was commercially released on August 31, 2023, in Peruvian theaters.

== Accolades ==
| Year | Award | Category | Recipient | Result | Ref. |
|---|---|---|---|---|---|
| 2023 | 14th APRECI Awards | Best Actress | Mayella Lloclla | Nominated | |
| 2023 | 14th APRECI Awards | Best Supporting Actress | Stephany Orúe | Nominated | |
| 2024 | 19th Luces Awards | Best Film | La decisión de Amelia | Nominated | |
| 2024 | 19th Luces Awards | Best Actress | Mayella Lloclla | Nominated | |
