= Antonia (2022 film) =

- Promotional release poster
- Directed by: Natalia Rojas Gamarra
- Written by: Natalia Rojas Gamarra
- Produced by: Morella Moret
- Starring: Antonia Moreno; Paulina Bazan
- Cinematography: Carmen Rojas Gamarra
- Edited by: Natalia Rojas Gamarra
- Music by: Rafo Ráez
- Production company: Yuraqyana
- Release date: August 6, 2022 (Lima)
- Running time: 72 minutes
- Country: Peru
- Language: Spanish

Antonia (Spanish: Antonia en la vida, lit. 'Antonia in life') is a 2022 Peruvian drama film written and directed by Natalia Rojas Gamarra in her directorial debut. It stars Antonia Moreno and Paulina Bazán. It is about a woman who must deal with the pressure of being a mother due to her age, although she has other desires.

== Synopsis ==
Antonia is a woman of almost 40 years old who deals with the social pressure of taking the big step: motherhood. Although her dream is to travel the world as a free traveler, she must reflect on her current situation. That is why she travels with her dog, Ayasqa, to the beach, to clear her mind and take charge of her future.

== Cast ==
- Antonia Moreno as Antonia
- Paulina Bazán as 17 year-old-girl

== Release ==
Antonia had its world premiere on August 6, 2022, as part of the Made in Peru section at the 26th Lima Film Festival, then it was screened on April 10 at the PUCP Cultural Center as part of the film cycle “Perú se Proyecto.”

== Reception ==
=== Critical reception ===
Nilton Arana Torres from Cinencuentro wrote: "Antonia functions as a fairly complete synthesis of what it means to live in a world where time seems to end soon. Although its duration is just over an hour, it is an honest and unpretentious proposal that manages to maintain interest thanks to a sober execution and a protagonist written with sufficient depth."

=== Accolades ===
Year	Award / Festival	Category	Recipient	Result	Ref.
2021	26th Lima Film Festival	Audience Award	Antonia	Nominated	
2023	14th APRECI Awards	Best Actress	Antonia Moreno	Nominated	
2023	14th APRECI Awards	Best Supporting Actress	Paulina Bazán	Nominated	
