= The Visitor (2022 Bolivian film) =

Film by Martín Boulocq

- Theatrical release poster
- Spanish: El visitante
- Directed by: Martín Boulocq
- Written by: Martín Boulocq; Rodrigo Hasbun
- Produced by: Martín Boulocq; Andrea Camponovo; Hernán Musaluppi; Santiago López Rodríguez; Alvaro Olmos Torrico
- Starring: Svet Mena; Enrique Araoz
- Cinematography: Germán Nocella
- Edited by: Irene Cajias
- Production companies: CQ Films; Empatía Cinema
- Release dates: 11 June 2022 (Tribeca); 2 March 2023 (Bolivia); 6 July 2023 (Uruguay)
- Running time: 86 minutes
- Countries: Bolivia; Uruguay
- Language: Spanish

The Visitor (Spanish: El visitante) is a 2022 drama film directed by Martín Boulocq and written by Boulocq and Rodrigo Hasbun. It is about Humberto who seeks to recover the bond with his daughter and offer her a decent life after being released from prison, although obtaining custody will be very difficult. Starring Svet Mena and Enrique Araoz. It was selected as the Bolivian entry for the Best International Feature Film at the 96th Academy Awards.

The Visitor had its world premiere at the 20th Tribeca Festival on 11 June 2022, where it won Best Screenplay in the International Competition.

== Synopsis ==
Humberto, a wake singer who has just been released from jail. His greatest desire is to reconnect with his daughter and offer her a dignified life, but the girl's grandparents, evangelical pastors, are not willing to easily give up custody of their only granddaughter.

== Cast ==
- Enrique Araoz
- Svet Mena
- César Troncoso
- Mirella Pascual
- Teresa Gutierrez
- Romel Vargas as Joaquin

== Production ==
Principal photography began on 28 October 2019 and ended on 30 November of the same year in Cochabamba, Bolivia.

== Release ==
The Visitor had its world premiere on 11 June 2022 at the 20th Tribeca Festival, then screened on 8 August 2022 at the 26th Lima Film Festival, on 5 October 2022 at the 59th Antalya Golden Orange Film Festival, on 21 October 2022 at the 46th Mostra Internacional de Cinema em São Paulo, on 4 November 2022 at the 37th Mar del Plata International Film Festival and on 31 January 2023 at the Göteborg Film Festival.

The film was released theatrically in Bolivia on 2 March 2023 and in Uruguay on 6 July 2023.

== Accolades ==
Year	Award / Festival	Category	Recipient	Result	Ref.
2022	Tribeca Festival	Best International Narrative Feature	The Visitor	Nominated	
2022	Tribeca Festival	Best Screenplay	Martín Boulocq & Rodrigo Hasbun	Won	
2022	Lima Film Festival	Best Picture	The Visitor	Nominated	
2022	Lima Film Festival	Best Screenplay	Martín Boulocq & Rodrigo Hasbun	Won	
2022	Antalya Golden Orange Film Festival	Best International Feature Film	The Visitor	Won	
2022	Mar del Plata International Film Festival	Best Latin-American Film	The Visitor	Nominated	
2022	Mar del Plata International Film Festival	Best Technical Realization and Treatment of Social Issues	The Visitor	Won	

== See also ==
- List of submissions to the 96th Academy Awards for Best International Feature Film
- List of Bolivian submissions for the Academy Award for Best International Feature Film
