= Mirlo's Dance =

- Theatrical release poster
- Directed by: Álvaro Luque
- Written by: Jorge Ossio Seminario; Emanuel Giraldo Betancur
- Produced by: Melissa Cordero; Nicolás Carrasco; Renzo Maldonado; Ricardo Maldonado
- Cinematography: Juan Pablo Polanco
- Edited by: Gino Moreno; Rodrigo Luque
- Music by: Los Mirlos
- Production companies: When; Lunatica Films; Cine 70
- Release dates: August 4, 2022 (Lima); February 29, 2024 (Peru)
- Running time: 84 minutes
- Country: Peru
- Language: Spanish

Mirlo's Dance (Spanish: La danza de Los Mirlos) is a 2022 Peruvian documentary film directed by Álvaro Luque (in his directorial debut) and written by Jorge Ossio Seminario and Emanuel Giraldo Betancur. It follows the Amazonian cumbia band Los Mirlos through a journey through the heart of Latin America and remembers its history.

== Synopsis ==
Jorge Rodríguez, vocalist of Los Mirlos, accompanies us in a review of the history of this revered Amazonian cumbia band, which mixed the traditions and folklore of the region with the psychedelic rhythms of the 60s.

== Release ==
Mirlo's Dance had its world premiere on August 4, 2022, at the 26th Lima Film Festival, then screened on October 10, 2022, at the 9th Trujillo Film Festival, on November 8, 2022, at the 37th Mar del Plata International Film Festival, on November 19, 2022, at the 34th Viña del Mar International Film Festival, on September 10, 2023, at the 21st Vancouver Latin American Film Festival, and on November 10, 2023, at the 38th Festival del Cinema Ibero-Latino Americano di Trieste. It was commercially released on February 29, 2024, in Peruvian theaters.

== Accolades ==
Year	Award / Festival	Category	Recipient	Result	Ref.
2022	9th Trujillo Film Festival	Best Documentary Feature Film	Mirlo's Dance	Won	
2022	37th Mar del Plata International Film Festival	Cinema in Prisons Program Award - Special Mention	Mirlo's Dance	Won	
2023	14th APRECI Awards	Best Documentary	Mirlo's Dance	Nominated	
