= The Monroy Affaire =

- Theatrical release poster
- Spanish: El caso Monroy
- Directed by: Josué Méndez
- Screenplay by: Josué Méndez
- Based on: Día de visita by Marco Avilés
- Starring: Damián Alcázar
- Cinematography: Rodrigo Pulpeiro
- Edited by: Eliane Katz; Roberto Benavides; Jonás Hass
- Music by: Sami Buccella
- Production companies: Chullachaki Producciones; Tondero Producciones; Gema Films
- Release dates: October 6, 2022 (television); October 5, 2023 (Peru)
- Running time: 95 minutes
- Countries: Peru; Argentina
- Language: Spanish

The Monroy Affaire (Spanish: El caso Monroy) is a 2022 black tragicomedy film written and directed by Josué Méndez. Starring Damián Alcázar accompanied by Wendy Vásquez, Liliana Trujillo, Sylvia Majo, Olivia Manrufo, Lía Camilo, Maryloli Pérez, María Zubiri and Grapa Paola. It is based on the book Día de visita by Marco Avilés.

== Synopsis ==
Ronnie Monroy has been an anonymous public employee his entire life. About to turn 65 and retire, he visits the women's prison, where he finds a new purpose. Help inmates regain their freedom and get back to their lives. But what you think is motivated by generosity and affection is actually driven by a perverse need to wield power. Ronnie becomes another abuser within the corrupt Peruvian judicial system.

== Cast ==
- Damián Alcázar as Ronnie Monroy
- Wendy Vásquez
- Liliana Trujillo
- Sylvia Majo
- Olivia Manrufo
- Lía Camilo
- Maryloli Pérez
- María Zubiri
- Grapa Paola

== Release ==
The Monroy Affaire premiered on October 6, 2022, on the CINE.AR television signal, then was screened on March 16, 2023, at the 26th Malaga Film Festival, on August 17, 2023, at the 27th Lima Film Festival and on November 23, 2023, at the 2nd Latin Film Festival. It was commercially released on October 5, 2023, in Peruvian theaters.

== Reception ==
=== Box-office ===
In its first week on the billboard, it debuted in thirteenth place, attracting 13,500 viewers. After 7 weeks on the billboard, it caught a total of 20,342 viewers.

=== Accolades ===
Year	Award	Category	Recipient	Result	Ref.
2024	15th APRECI Awards	Best Peruvian Feature Film	The Monroy Affaire	Nominated	
2024	15th APRECI Awards	Best Director	Josué Méndez	Nominated	
2024	15th APRECI Awards	Best Actor	Damián Alcázar	Won	
2024	15th APRECI Awards	Best Supporting Actress	Liliana Trujillo	Nominated	
2024	15th APRECI Awards	Best Supporting Actress	Wendy Vásquez	Nominated	
2024	15th APRECI Awards	Best Screenplay	Josué Méndez	Nominated	
2024	Luces Awards	Best Film	The Monroy Affaire	Nominated	
2024	Luces Awards	Best Actor	Damián Alcázar	Nominated	
2024	11th Platino Awards	Best Actor	Damián Alcázar	Nominated	
