= Guapo'y =

- Promotional release poster
- Directed by: Sofía Paoli Thorne
- Written by: Sofía Paoli Thorne
- Produced by: Gabriela Cueto; Federico Pozzi; Sofía Paoli Thorne
- Cinematography: Delfina Margulis Darriba; Willi Behnisch
- Edited by: Cecilia Almeida Saquieres
- Production company: Tekoha Audiovisual
- Release date: 14 November 2022 (IDFA)
- Running time: 70 minutes
- Countries: Paraguay; Argentina; Qatar
- Language: Spanish

Guapo'y is a 2022 documentary film written, directed and co-produced by Sofía Paoli Thorne in her directorial debut. It is about the pain suffered by Celsa Ramírez, an artist, mother and fighter who was a victim of repression during the Estronista dictatorship in Paraguay. It is a co-production between Paraguay, Argentina and Qatar.

Guapo'y had its world premiere at the 35th International Documentary Film Amsterdam on November 14, 2022, where it was nominated for Best First Feature, obtaining a special mention. It also won the Biznaga de Plata for Best Director in the documentary competition at the 26th Málaga Film Festival.

== Synopsis ==
Celsa lives in the shadows of her bedroom, covering her body with roots. She lives looking for remedies to alleviate her pain caused by the torture she experienced 45 years ago during the military dictatorship in Paraguay.

== Cast ==
- Celsa Ramírez

== Release ==
Guapo'y had its world premiere on November 14, 2022, in the Luminou section of the 35th International Documentary Film Amsterdam, then screened on March 3, 2023, at the True/False Film Festival, on March 16, 2023, at the 26th Málaga Film Festival, on April 6, 2023, at the 41st International Film Festival of Uruguay, on May 30, 2023, at the 12th International Political Film Festival, on June 25, 2023, at the La Plata Latin American Film Festival and on August 13, 2023, at the 27th Lima Film Festival.

== Accolades ==
Year	Award / Festival	Category	Recipient	Result	Ref.
2022	International Documentary Film Amsterdam	Best First Feature	Guapo'y	Nominated	
2022	International Documentary Film Amsterdam	Best First Feature - Special Mention	Guapo'y	Won	
2023	Málaga Film Festival	Documentary Competition - Best Director	Sofía Paoli Thorne	Won	
2023	International Film Festival of Uruguay	Human Rights Film Competition - Best Film	Guapo'y	Won	
2023	International Film Festival of Uruguay	Audience Award	Guapo'y	Won	
2023	Lima Film Festival	Best Documentary	Guapo'y	Nominated	
