= Willaq Pirqa, the Cinema of My Village =

Willaq Pirqa
- Theatrical release poster
- Directed by: César Galindo
- Written by: César Galindo; Augusto Cabada; Gastón Vizcarra
- Produced by: Jedy Ortega Moreno
- Starring: Víctor Acurio; Hermelinda Luján; Melisa Álvarez; Alder Yaurisaca
- Cinematography: Juan Durán
- Edited by: Roberto Benavides Espino
- Music by: Karin Zielinski
- Release dates: August 4, 2022 (Lima); December 8, 2022 (Peru)
- Running time: 89 minutes
- Countries: Peru; Bolivia
- Languages: Quechua; Spanish

Willaq Pirqa, the Cinema of My Village (whose original title is Willaq Pirqa, el cine de mi pueblo, lit. 'The Wall of Information, the cinema of my town') is a 2022 Quechua-language comedy-drama film directed by César Galindo and written by Galindo, Augusto Cabada and Gastón Vizcarra. It tells the story of Sistu, a 13-year-old boy who lives in a community in Cusco, he discovers the magic of cinema, but the language barrier prevents the villagers from enjoying the movies.

The film was selected as the Peruvian entry for Best Ibero-American Film at the 38th Goya Awards, but was not nominated.

== Synopsis ==
Sistu and his small community in the Andes discover the magic of cinema. This meeting causes a stir but also confronts them with their culture and highlights the limitations of the community to understand and read Spanish. As a solution, they choose Sistu so that every week he goes to town to see a movie and tells it to everyone in the square. One day he finds the paddock empty, the cinema has left.... Sistu's illusion of telling the weekly story to the people who are waiting for him, makes him create his own cinema, with his own actors, with his own culture and above all, in his own language.

== Cast ==
The actors participating in this film are:

- Víctor Acurio as Sistu
- Hermelinda Luján as Mom Simona
- Melisa Álvarez as Lucicha
- Alder Yaurisaca as Florencio
- Cosme Flores as Rolín
- Bernando Rosado as Projectionist
- Juan Ubaldo Huaman

== Production ==
=== Financing and filming ===
In 2015, the film was a beneficiary of the Economic Stimulus of the Ministry of Culture, in the competition for fiction feature film projects in native languages. The subsequent filming, in Maras and Moray, Cusco, took place over five months.

=== Music ===
Karin Zielinski composed the original soundtrack for the film. Wind, string and percussion instruments such as the Andean violin were implemented. The musicians Rubén Concha (quenas, zampoñas, legüero bass drum, charango and guitar), Andrés Chimango Lares (Andean violin) and María Elena Pacheco (violin) also participated.

Willaq Pirqa

Soundtrack album by Karin Zielinski
- Released: December 8, 2022
- Genre: film soundtrack
- Length: 32:15

Willaq Pirqa (Original Motion Picture Soundtrack)
No.	Title	Writer(s)	Artist(s)	Length
1.	"Willaq Pirqa l"	Karin Zielinski	Karin Zielinski	1:00
2.	"Apaway Pichinkucha"	Karin Zielinski	Karin Zielinski	3:10
3.	"Wayramanta Willakuy"	Karin Zielinski	Karin Zielinski	0:32
4.	"Mama Simona (Koka K'intucha)"	Karin Zielinski	Karin Zielinski	1:24
5.	"Willaq Pirqa li"	Karin Zielinski	Karin Zielinski	0:57
6.	"Killa Tuta"	Karin Zielinski	Karin Zielinski	0:56
7.	"Llaqtaypaq Cinen"	Karin Zielinski	Karin Zielinski	2:07
8.	"Suyaway Pichinkucha"	Karin Zielinski	Karin Zielinski	0:34
9.	"Ñan Tariruniña"	Karin Zielinski	Karin Zielinski	0:32
10.	"Maypitaq Karqanki"	Karin Zielinski	Karin Zielinski	0:31
11.	"Apu Wayra Rositata Kutichimun (Koka K'intucha)"	Karin Zielinski	Karin Zielinski	0:25
12.	"Cineta Qhaswasunchis I"	Karin Zielinski	Karin Zielinski	2:26
13.	"Cinemanta Hamuq K'anchay"	Karin Zielinski	Karin Zielinski	0:37
14.	"Dracula Runamanta Willakuy"	Karin Zielinski	Karin Zielinski	1:51
15.	"Cineta Qhaswasunchis Ii"	Karin Zielinski	Karin Zielinski	1:33
16.	"Qonakuy"	Karin Zielinski	Karin Zielinski	1:15
17.	"Kamachiqa Sistu"	Karin Zielinski	Karin Zielinski	0:57
18.	"Sistu, Willakuq"	Karin Zielinski	Karin Zielinski	4:35
19.	"Mana Willaspalla"	Karin Zielinski	Karin Zielinski	2:00
20.	"Willakuyninchiskuna"	Karin Zielinski	Karin Zielinski	1:24
21.	"Mama Simona li (Koka K'intucha)"	Karin Zielinski	Karin Zielinski	1:13
22.	"Kacharpariy"	Karin Zielinski	Karin Zielinski	0:30
23.	"Epilogo Nisqamanta"	Karin Zielinski	Karin Zielinski	1:42
Total length:				32:15

== Release ==
The film had its world premiere on August 4, 2022, at the 26th Lima Film Festival. It was commercially released on December 8, 2022 in Peruvian theaters.

== Reception ==
Willaq Pirqa, the Cinema of My Village drew 42,000 viewers beginning in its sixth week in theaters and ending that same week with over 50,000 viewers. In its ninth week it drew more than 75,000 viewers. In its tenth week in theaters, it exceeded 80,000 viewers, ending its run with 83,382 viewers after 14 weeks. Becoming the most watched Quechua-language film in Peru.

== Accolades ==
Year	Award / Festival	Category	Recipient	Result	Ref.
2022	26th Lima Film Festival	Audience Award for Best Film	Willaq Pirqa, the Cinema of My Village	Won	
2022	26th Lima Film Festival	Ministry of Culture Jury Award for Best Peruvian Film	Willaq Pirqa, the Cinema of My Village	Won	
2022	26th Lima Film Festival	PUCP Community Award for Best Film "Made in Peru"	Willaq Pirqa, the Cinema of My Village	Won	
2023	Luces Awards	Best Film	Willaq Pirqa, the Cinema of My Village	Won	
2023	Luces Awards	Best Actor	Víctor Acurio	Won	
2023	Luces Awards	Best Actress	Hermelinda Luján	Nominated	
2023	14th APRECI Awards	Best Fiction Film	Willaq Pirqa, the Cinema of My Village	Won	
2023	14th APRECI Awards	Best Director	César Galindo	Won	
2023	14th APRECI Awards	Best Screenplay	César Galindo, Augusto Cabada & Gastón Vizcarra	Won	
2023	14th APRECI Awards	Best Actor	Víctor Acurio	Won	
2023	14th APRECI Awards	Best Supporting Actress	Hermelinda Luján	Won	
