= The Invisible Girl (film) =

La pampa
- Theatrical release poster
- Directed by: Dorian Fernández-Moris
- Written by: Dorian Fernández-Moris; Rogger Vergara Adrianzén
- Produced by: Paco Bardales; Dorian Fernández-Moris; Karina Jury; Fina Martínez; Chichi Fernández Moris; Alejandro Rius; Nevenka Yanovich; Ángel Zavaleta
- Starring: Fernando Bacilio
- Cinematography: Andres Paul Magallanes
- Edited by: Dorian Fernández-Moris; Chemo Loli; Percy Meza
- Production company: AV Films
- Distributed by: La Taberna Studios
- Release dates: August 2022 (Lima); June 29, 2023 (Peru)
- Running time: 106 minutes
- Countries: Peru; Spain; Chile
- Language: Spanish

The Invisible Girl (Spanish: La pampa) is a 2022 crime drama thriller film directed by Dorian Fernández-Moris and written by Fernández-Moris & Rogger Vergara Adrianzén. Starring Fernando Bacilio. It is based on the true story of a woman located in the lower area of Belén (Iquitos, Loreto), who had managed to escape from her traffickers. It is a co-production between Peru, Spain and Chile.

== Synopsis ==
Juan, a public official, is on the run from the law and the tragedy that scarred him for life. Reina, a teenager, is escaping the sexual and moral abuse she suffered as a child in the sexual exploitation camps of La Pampa, an area controlled by gold mining mafias. United by fate, they embark on a journey to find Reina's family in a lawless territory of the Peruvian Amazon, plagued by crime and greed.

== Cast ==
The actors participating in this film are:

- Fernando Bacilio as Pedro
- Luz Pinedo as Reina
- Mayella Lloclla as Sucy
- Pamela Lloclla as Isabel
- Oscar Carrillo as Don Lucho
- Alain Salinas
- Sylvia Majo
- Gonzalo Molina
- Antonieta Pari

== Production ==
=== Script ===
In 2017, Dorian Fernández-Moris received a story from a woman from Iquitos who managed to flee human trafficking in La pampa. After researching for a year and a half, they began writing the script.

=== Financing ===
The film won the Audiovisual Direction, Phonography and New Media (DAFO) award granted by the Ministry of Culture of Peru, where it received a donation of $150,000 to start production.

=== Filming ===
The film was filmed in Pucallpa, Ucayali where the real sets of La pampa had to be recreated.

== Release ==
The Invisible Girl initially premiered in August 2022 at the 26th Lima Film Festival as part of the Fiction Competition. Its commercially premiered on June 29, 2023 in Peruvian theaters.

== Awards ==
Year	Award	Category	Recipient	Result	Ref.
2022	Gramado Film Festival	Best Foreign Film	The Invisible Girl	Won	
2022	Gramado Film Festival	Special Jury Award - Art Direction	Jeff Calmet	Won	
2022	Calzada de Calatrava International Film Festival	Best Direction Photography	Andrés Magallanes	Won	
2022	Islantilla Cineforum Film Festival	Best Screenplay	Dorian Fernández-Moris & Rogger Vergara Adrianzén	Won	
2022	Islantilla Cineforum Film Festival	Best Art Direction	Jeff Calmet	Won	
2022	Trujillo Film Festival	Best Fiction Film	The Invisible Girl	Won	
2022	Trujillo Film Festival	Special Jury Award for Best Performance	Fernando Bacilio	Won	
2022	Huanuco Film Festival	Best Film - Audience	The Invisible Girl	Won	
2024	Luces Awards	Best Film	The Invisible Girl	Nominated	
2024	Luces Awards	Best Actor	Fernando Bacilio	Nominated	
2024	Luces Awards	Best Actress	Luz Pinedo	Nominated	
