= We're All Sailors =

- Film poster
- Spanish: Todos somos marineros
- Directed by: Miguel Angel Moulet
- Written by: Miguel Angel Moulet
- Produced by: Pablo Lozano; Miguel Angel Moulet; Tanya Valette
- Cinematography: Camilo Soratti
- Edited by: Nino Martínez Sosa
- Production companies: El Navegante Films; Monte y Culebra SRL
- Release date: 2018
- Running time: 104 minutes
- Countries: Peru; Dominican Republic
- Languages: Spanish; Russian

We're All Sailors (Spanish: Todos somos marineros) is a 2018 drama film written and directed by Miguel Angel Moulet in his directorial debut. It stars Andrey Sladkov and Ravil Sadreev.

== Synopsis ==
Three Russian sailors have found themselves stranded aboard a fishing trawler off the coast of Chimbote, a port city in Peru. The ship's owner's company has gone bankrupt, and the crew has abandoned the vessel, leaving Krystof, his younger brother, and the skipper without the resources to return home. The three men have been surviving as best they can by commuting between the ship and the port for their daily necessities, while awaiting their next course of action

== Cast ==
The actors participating in this film are:

- Andrey Sladkov as Tolya
- Ravil Sadreev as Vitya
- Julia Thays as Sonia
- Gonzalo Vargas Vilela as Tito
- Julia Thays
- Gonzalo Alejandro Vargas
- Beto Benites

== Production ==
=== Financing ===
In 2015, the film won the 2015 Production Contest Award from the Ministry of Culture (DAFO) and the 2016 Ibermedia-Co-Production Program Award, which provided them with enough budget to start filming the film.

=== Casting ===
The casting was made up for the most part by non-professional actors of Russian origin.

=== Filming ===
Principal photography began approximately June 2017 in Chimbote. Filming lasted 11 days inside the ship.

== Release ==
It had an initial premiere in August 2018 at the 22nd edition of the Lima Film Festival. The commercial premiere in Peruvian theaters was scheduled for February 6, 2020, but was delayed until February 20 of the same year.

== Reception ==
In its opening weekend, the film drew 660 viewers.

== Awards ==
Year	Award	Category	Recipient	Result	Ref.
2018	22nd Lima Film Festival	Best Peruvian Film Script in Fiction Competition	Miguel Angel Moulet	Won	
2018	22nd Lima Film Festival	Best First Film - Special Jury Mention	We're All Sailors	Won	
2021	12th APRECI Awards	Best Peruvian Feature Film	We're All Sailors	Nominated	
2021	12th APRECI Awards	Best Screenplay	Miguel Angel Moulet	Nominated	
2021	12th APRECI Awards	Best Actor	Alejandro Vargas Vilela	Nominated	
2021	12th APRECI Awards	Best Actress	Julia Thays	Won	
2021	Luces Awards	Best Film	We're All Sailors	Nominated	
2021	Luces Awards	Best Actor	Andrey Sladkov	Nominated	
2021	Luces Awards	Best Actor	Alejandro Vargas Vilela	Nominated	
2021	Luces Awards	Best Actress	Julia Thays	Nominated	
