= El viaje macho =

- Theatrical release poster
- Directed by: Luis Basurto
- Written by: Luis Basurto
- Produced by: Luis Basurto
- Starring: Luis Ramírez
- Cinematography: César Fe
- Edited by: Christiand Lu
- Production company: Badu Producciones
- Release dates: July 8, 2016 (Lima Independiente Festival); November 25, 2021 (Peru)
- Running time: 82 minutes
- Country: Peru
- Language: Spanish

El viaje macho (lit. 'The male journey') is a 2016 Peruvian drama road movie written, produced, and directed by Luis Basurto in his directorial debut. It stars Luis Ramírez. It is about 2 ex-prisoners who embark on a journey in search of the last freedom by getting on the "male train".

== Synopsis ==
Dr. Carlos Espejo has served a long and unjust sentence, and upon leaving he discovers a modern society different from the one he knew. The years in prison have changed his life: his son has moved away from the pressure of his father's conviction, and the search for his old friends and colleagues yields no results. With little to cling to in the city, Carlos will let himself be carried away by the Andean ravine riding the mythical "male train" guiding Nazario, a blind man he met in prison. Both will persevere to adapt to a changing world, embarking on the macho journey towards their ultimate freedom.

== Cast ==
The actors participating in this film are:

- Luis Ramírez as Dr. Carlos Espejo
- Amiel Cayo as Nazario
- Magaly Solier
- Juan Ubaldo Huamán

== Financing ==
In 2009, the film was financially supported by the Ibermedia program. 3 years later, the film obtained S/.440,000 to start the formal production of the film after having won a Fiction Feature Film Works Project Contest awarded by the Ministry of Culture of Peru.

== Release ==
=== Festivals ===
El viaje macho premiered on July 8, 2016, at the Lima Independiente Festival 2016. Before its commercial premiere, it participated in the 30th Biarritz Latin America Film Festival (France), the 6th Quito Latin American Film Festival (Ecuador) and the 6th Trujillo Film Festival 2019 (Peru).

=== Commercial release ===
The film was scheduled to be released commercially in April 2020 in Peruvian theaters but it was canceled due to the COVID-19 pandemic. Finally, it was commercially released on November 25, 2021, in Peruvian theaters.

== Awards ==
Year	Award	Category	Recipient	Result	Ref.
2019	6th Trujillo Film Festival	Best Fiction Film	El viaje macho	Won	
2022	Luces Awards	Best Film	El viaje macho	Nominated	
2022	Luces Awards	Best Actor	Luis Ramírez	Nominated	
