= Tayta Shanti =

- Theatrical release poster
- Directed by: Hans Matos Camac
- Written by: Hans Matos Camac
- Produced by: Julia Gamarra Hinostroza
- Starring: Julia Thays; Maria Tesoro Tapia; Melvin Quijada; Gianco Ponce; Laurens Flores; Marco Miranda; Benjamin Baltazar
- Cinematography: Johan Carrasco
- Edited by: Hans Matos Camac
- Music by: Eduardo Ferré
- Production company: Myxomatosis Kino
- Release dates: August 14, 2023 (Lima); February 29, 2024 (Peru)
- Running time: 76 minutes
- Country: Peru
- Language: Spanish

Tayta Shanti is a 2023 Peruvian drama film written, edited and directed by Hans Matos Camac. It is about Angie and her cousin Marcelo who must face their own identity: she struggling to accept her Indigenous Huanca origins and he struggling to accept his true sexuality.

== Synopsis ==
The Valdez family gathers for the traditional Tayta Shanti festival. Angela arrives from the capital with her daughter Angie, who denies her provincial roots. In the midst of the hustle and bustle of the party, Angie and her cousin Marcelo will have to confront her identity, since she does not consider herself Huancaína and he represses his sexuality.

== Cast ==
- Julia Thays as Angela Valdez
- María Tesoro Tapia as Angie
- Melvin Quijada as Mr. Santillán
- Gianco Ponce as Marcelo Valdez
- Laurens Flores as Sebastian
- Benjamin Baltazar as Fede
- Marco Miranda

== Production ==
Principal photography lasted 4 weeks starting in July 2022 in Huancayo, Junín.

== Release ==
Tayta Shanti had its world premiere on August 14, 2023, in the Made in Peru section at the 27th Lima Film Festival. It was commercially released on February 29, 2024, in Peruvian theaters.

== Reception ==
=== Critical reception ===
Gustavo Herrera Taboada from Cinencuentro wrote: "Tayta Shanti has technical aspects to improve, including its limited variety of photographic compositions and some continuity issues in editing. However, like its peculiar soundtrack, it is an ambitious Huancaí production that achieves a harmonious marriage between tradition and modernity, and that ends up spreading its good humor and even better intentions."

=== Accolades ===
Year	Award / Festival	Category	Recipient	Result	Ref.
2023	27th Lima Film Festival	Made in Peru - Audience Award	Tayta Shanti	Nominated	
2024	11th Huánuco Film Festival	Best Released Fiction Feature Film	Tayta Shanti	Nominated	
2024	11th Huánuco Film Festival	Best Released Fiction Feature Film - Honorable Mention	Tayta Shanti	Won	
