= Pirú: A Golden Journey =

- Theatrical release poster
- Directed by: Bismarck Rojas
- Written by: Bismarck Rojas; Sara Rojas
- Produced by: Sara Rojas
- Starring: Emmanuel Soriano; Andrés Salas
- Cinematography: Jorge Cerna
- Edited by: Bismarck Rojas
- Music by: Nelson Bravo
- Production company: Veintiuno Films
- Release date: October 5, 2023
- Running time: 116 minutes
- Country: Peru
- Language: Spanish

Pirú: A Golden Journey (Spanish: Pirú: Un viaje de oro) is a 2023 Peruvian comedy-drama film directed and edited by Bismarck Rojas (in his directorial debut) who co-wrote with Sara Rojas. It stars Emmanuel Soriano and Andrés Salas accompanied by the debutants Mateo Castrejón and María Teresa Tello. It premiered on October 5, 2023, in Peruvian theaters.

== Synopsis ==
Alí travels with his best friend José María to the mountains of Peru for work. Near their destination, their car loses control and crashes in the countryside of Hermelinda, a renegade old woman who lives in the town of Quri Suncu. This chance meeting between the young people and the local people begins a relationship that, although it begins with some rejection, becomes friendship. The real conflict comes when Alí and José María discover that the job they have gone to do consists of moving their new friends from their homes to start a new mining project.

== Cast ==
- Emmanuel Soriano as Alí
- Andrés Salas as José María
- Mateo Castrejón as Pirú
- María Teresa Tello as Hermelinda
- Pedro Olórtegui
- Laura Adrianzén
- Eliseo Arrieta
- Martín Martínez

== Production ==
Principal photography lasted 7 weeks starting on August 14, 2022, and ending on September 19 of the same year in Cajamarca, Peru.

== Reception ==
=== Box office ===
In its first weekend in billboard, the film reached fourth place, attracting 35,000 viewers. It ended its run in theaters with 92,352 viewers, becoming the eighth most viewed Peruvian film of 2023.

=== Accolades ===
Year	Award / Festival	Category	Recipient	Result	Ref.
2023	10th Huánuco Film Festival	Best Fiction Feature Film Already Released	Pirú: A Golden Journey	Won	
2024	Luces Awards	Best Film	Pirú: A Golden Journey	Nominated	
2024	Luces Awards	Best Actor	Emanuel Soriano	Nominated	
