= The Lips =

2010 film

- Spanish: Los labios
- Directed by: Iván Fund; Santiago Loza
- Written by: Iván Fund; Santiago Loza
- Produced by: Iván Fund; Santiago Loza; Iván Eibuszyc
- Starring: Eva Bianco
- Cinematography: María Laura Collasso
- Edited by: Lorena Moriconi
- Distributed by: Magic Lantern Films
- Release date: May 18, 2010
- Running time: 100 minutes
- Country: Argentina
- Language: Spanish

The Lips (Spanish: Los labios) is a 2010 Argentine drama film directed by Iván Fund and Santiago Loza. It was entered into the Un Certain Regard section of the 2010 Cannes Film Festival.

The film opened theatrically in the United States at Maysles Cinema in June, 2011 as part of the Documentary in Bloom series.

== Cast ==
- Eva Bianco
- Raul Lagge
- Victoria Raposo
- Adela Sanchez

== Plot ==
The film follows a three women who deeply inhabit their cinematic roles as social workers interacting with members of an impoverished rural Argentine neighborhood. Facing poverty, the three move into makeshift living quarters in a run down hospital. They then begin the work of recording data on the needs of the community and getting to know each other, while trying to make their living quarters habitable, and still find time for an occasional night out.

== Awards ==
- 2010 Cannes Film Festival: Un Certain Regard Award for Best Actress (Adela Sanchez, Eva Bianco, and Victoria Raposo)
