= Daughter of Rage =

- Mexican theatrical release poster
- Directed by: Laura Baumeister de Montis
- Written by: Laura Baumeister de Montis
- Produced by: Laura Baumeister de Montis; Rossana Baumeister; Bruna Haddad; Martha Orozco
- Starring: Ara Alejandra Medal
- Cinematography: Teresa Kuhn
- Edited by: Julián Sarmiento; Raúl Barreras
- Music by: PARA One; Arthur Simonini
- Production companies: Cardón Pictures; Dag Hoel Filmproduksjon; Felipa Films; Heimatfilm; Marth Films; Nephilim Producciones; Promenades Films
- Distributed by: A Contracorriente Films (Spain); Trigon Film (Switzerland); Tamasa Distribution (France); Interior 13 Cine (Mexico); Stroll Films (Japan); HBO (Eastern Europe)
- Release dates: 10 September 2022 (TIFF); 21 April 2023 (Spain)
- Running time: 91 minutes
- Countries: Nicaragua; Mexico; Netherlands; Germany; France; Norway
- Language: Spanish

Daughter of Rage (Spanish: La hija de todas las rabias, lit. 'The daughter of all rages') is a 2022 drama film written, co-produced and directed by Laura Baumeister de Montis in her directorial debut achieved the milestone of becoming the first Nicaraguan woman to direct a fiction film. It is about María who is abandoned by her mother in a recycling plant where she is forced to work with other children. Starring Ara Alejandra Medal. It is a co-production between Nicaragua, Mexico, the Netherlands, Germany, France and Norway.

== Synopsis ==
María, 11 years old, lives with her mother Lilibeth on the edge of a huge garbage dump. Her future depends on selling a litter of purebred puppies to a local gang member. When the deal falls through, Lilibeth is forced to go to the outskirts of the city and leave Maria in a recycling factory where she has to stay working. Days go by and the mother does not return. Maria feels lost, bewildered, and angry. One night, María meets Tadeo, a noble and dreamy child who is determined to help her reunite with her mother.

== Cast ==
The actors participating in this film are:

- Ara Alejandra Medal as María
- Carlos Gutiérrez as Tadeo
- Virginia Raquel Sevilla García as Lilibeth
- Diana Sedano as Rosa
- Noé Hernández as Raúl

== Production ==
Casting began on January 10, 2020, in Nicaragua with plans to start filming in the following 2 months. But it was delayed 10 months due to the COVID-19 pandemic, forcing the protagonist girl to be changed for another.

== Release ==
=== Festivals ===
Daughter of Rage had its world premiere on September 10, 2022, at the 47th Toronto International Film Festival, to then be screened on September 18, 2022, at the 70th San Sebastián International Film Festival, on October 8, 2022, at the 27th Busan International Film Festival, on November 12, 2022, at the Oslo Films from the South Festival, on November 26, 2022, at the 40th Torino Film festival, on February 8, 2023, at the 38th Santa Barbara International Film Festival, on March 7, 2023, at the Kosmorama Trondheim International Film Festival, on March 9, 2023, at the Miami International Film Festival, on March 10, 2023, at the International Film Festival and Forum on Human Rights Geneva, on March 22, 2023, at the 39th Villeurbanne Festival Reflets du cinéma ibérique et Latino-américain, on March 25, 2023, at the 15th Movies That Matter Festival, on March 27, 2023, at the Cleveland International Film Festival, on April 15, 2023, at the Minneapolis St. Paul International Film Festival & San Francisco International Film Festival, on April 20, 2023, at the 39th Chicago Latino Film Festival, on June 12, 2023, at the 22nd Transilvania International Film Festival and on August 16, 2023, at the 27th Lima Film Festival.

=== Theatrical ===
It was released commercially on April 21, 2023, in Spanish theaters to later expand to the Swiss market on July 6, 2023.

== Accolades ==
Year	Award / Festival	Category	Recipient	Result	Ref.
2022	San Sebastian International Film Festival	New Directors Award	Daughter of Rage	Nominated	
2022	San Sebastian International Film Festival	Best Project of the VIII Europe-Latin America Co-production Forum	Daughter of Rage	Won	
2022	San Sebastian International Film Festival	EFADs-CAACI Award	Daughter of Rage	Won	
2022	San Sebastian International Film Festival	Artekino International Prize	Daughter of Rage	Won	
2022	Biarritz Latin America Festival	Biarrots Award	Daughter of Rage	Won	
2022	Biarritz Latin America Festival	French Syndicate of Film Critics Award	Daughter of Rage	Won	
2022	Oslo Films from the South Festival	New Voices Award - Best Feature Film	Daughter of Rage	Nominated	
2022	Morelia International Film Festival	Morelia Quorum - First Feature 2022	Daughter of Rage	Won	
2022	Torino Film festival	Best Film	Daughter of Rage	Nominated	
2023	Miami International Film Festival	First Feature Award	Daughter of Rage	Nominated	
2023	Cleveland International Film Festival	New Direction Competition	Daughter of Rage	Nominated	
2023	Minneapolis St. Paul International Film Festival	Emerging Filmmaker Award	Daughter of Rage	Nominated	
2023	Minneapolis St. Paul International Film Festival	Emerging Filmmaker Award - Special Jury Prize	Daughter of Rage	Won	
2023	Platino Awards	Best First Feature Film	Daughter of Rage	Nominated	
2023	San Francisco International Film Festival	Cine Latino Jury Award	Daughter of Rage	Won	
2023	Lima Film Festival	Best Picture	Daughter of Rage	Nominated	
