= My Storylof =

- Theatrical release poster
- Directed by: Benjamín Doig Espinoza
- Written by: Benjamín Doig Espinoza
- Starring: Benjamín Doig Espinoza
- Production company: No Hay Sin Suerte
- Release dates: September 22, 2025 (Lima); September 25, 2025 (Peru)
- Running time: 87 minutes
- Country: Peru
- Language: Spanish

My Storylof is a 2025 Peruvian romantic comedy-drama written, starring and directed by Benjamín Doig Espinoza in his directorial debut. With an autobiographical tone, it follows the young Benjamín "Benjadoes" through his love life while pursuing his film studies.

== Synopsis ==
Benjamin "Benjadoes" is a teenager who moves to Lima to pursue his university studies. However, he meets Valeria, his first love, and later Alessia. His romantic journey will transform him.

== Cast ==
- Benjamín Doig Espinoza as Himself
- Isabela Fernández
- Doménica del Pozo

== Release ==
The film had its avant premiere on September 22, 2025, in Lima, followed by a wide national theatrical release on September 25.

== Accolades ==
Award / Festival	Date of ceremony	Category	Recipient(s)	Result	Ref.
Luces Awards	23 April 2026	Best Film	My Storylof	Nominated	
