= The Pink House (film) =

La casa rosada
- Theatrical release poster
- Spanish: La casa rosada
- Directed by: Palito Ortega Matute
- Written by: Palito Ortega Matute
- Produced by: Nelva Acuña; Palito Ortega Matute
- Starring: José Luis Adrianzen; Ricardo Bromley López; Shantal Lozano
- Cinematography: Jorge Cerna
- Edited by: Palito Ortega Matute; Renato Ortega
- Music by: Jorge Luís Cárdenas Sotolongo
- Production companies: Peru Movie EIRL; Andina Compañía Cinematográfica
- Release dates: March 2017 (San Diego); May 3, 2018 (Peru)
- Running time: 102 minutes
- Country: Peru
- Language: Spanish

The Pink House (Spanish: La casa rosada) is a 2017 Peruvian crime drama thriller film written and directed by Palito Ortega Matute. It premiered in March 2017 at the San Diego Latino Film Festival. It was released posthumously on May 3, 2018 in Peruvian cinemas. It is one of the most awarded Peruvian films of recent years. According to the director, it is the biggest movie he has been able to produce.

== Synopsis ==
An Ayacucho family endures the violence of the Internal Armed Conflict when a professor father is accused of terrorism, tortured, and forced to flee with his children to Lima.

== Cast ==
- José Luis Adrianzen as Adrián Mendoza Torres, the teacher
- Ricardo Bromley as John of God
- Shantall Lozano as Maria del Carmen
- Camila Mac Lennan as Aunt Rosa
- Rodrigo Viaggio as The disturbed
- Kike Casterot as Squid 10
- Carlos Cano as Army Major
- Ramón García - Taxi Driver
- Christian Esquivel as Sinchi Manuel
- Jhonny Mendoza as Lieutenant
- Segundino Huamancusi as Artisan prisoner
- Oswaldo Salas as Flat soldier
- Nelba Acuña as Hiker 1

== Background ==
Palito Ortega Matute saw first-hand the facilities of "the pink house", a place where people accused of being part of Shining Path were tortured, when at the age of 16, while accompanying a university student, he was detained by the armed forces and he spent a month and a half in that place, near the Los Cabitos army barracks. He was able to leave here thanks to the fact that his family was able to prove his innocence and that they achieved influential contacts at that time.

== Controversies ==
Prior to its release, the film was subject to controversy. Congressman and Army Division General (r) Edwin Donayre alleged that the tape "denigrated the Armed Forces." The actress Karina Calmet was ridiculed after she described it via Twitter as an apology for terrorism. Due to the controversy, the film was withdrawn from several theaters. Despite this, the film remained on the billboard for seven weeks and the LUM presents it regularly as part of its memory strengthening activities.

== Awards ==
Year	Award / Festival	Category	Result
2018	Luces Awards, Perú	Best Film	Nominated
2017	Slemani International Film Festival, Irak	Special Mention of the Jury	Won
2017	Guayaquil International Film Festival, Ecuador	Best Actor	Won
2017	Guayaquil International Film Festival, Ecuador	Best Edition	Won
2017	No Identity Action Films Festival, Seville, Spain	Best Soundtrack	Won
2017	Bajo La Luna International Film Festival - Islantilla Cinefórum, Spain	Best Art Direction	Won
2016	Lugo International Auteur Film Week	Best Film	Won
2009	Conacine National Film Projects Competition	Feature Film Projects	Won
