= Single, Married, Widowed, Divorced =

- Theatrical release poster
- Spanish: Soltera, casada, viuda, divorciada
- Directed by: Ani Alva Helfer
- Written by: Ani Alva Helfer
- Produced by: Gianella Neyra
- Starring: Gianella Neyra; Katia Condos; Milene Vásquez; Patricia Portocarrero
- Music by: Karin Zielinski
- Production company: La Soga Producciones
- Distributed by: BF Distribution
- Release date: April 20, 2023
- Running time: 94 minutes
- Country: Peru
- Language: Spanish

Single, Married, Widowed, Divorced (Spanish: Soltera, casada, viuda, divorciada) is a 2023 Peruvian comedy road movie written and directed by Ani Alva Helfer. It stars Gianella Neyra, Katia Condos, Milene Vásquez and Patricia Portocarrero. It premiered on April 20, 2023, in Peruvian theaters.

== Synopsis ==
After the death of Cecilia's husband, she and 3 other friends get together and prepare to take a trip to Pacasmayo, but the trip turns into a crazy odyssey that puts their friendship to the test. On the way to help her friend close her grief, they must learn to unite to face the challenges in their lives and they will try to give themselves a second chance to heal wounds, overcome fears and accept themselves.

== Cast ==
The actors participating in this film are:

- Gianella Neyra as Cecilia
- Katia Condos as Conny
- Milene Vázquez as Lorena
- Patricia Portocarrero as Daniela
- Diego Bertie as Leonardo
- Rodrigo Sánchez Patiño
- Rodrigo Palacios
- Giovanni Ciccia

== Production ==
Soltera, casada, viuda, divorciada began filming in mid-July 2022 in northern Peru (Pacasmayo)

=== Accolades ===
Year	Award / Festival	Category	Recipient	Result	Ref.
2024	Luces Awards	Best Film	Single, Married, Widowed, Divorced	Won	
2024	Luces Awards	Best Actress	Gianella Neyra	Won	
2024	Luces Awards	Best Actress	Milene Vásquez	Nominated	
