= Bantamweight (film) =

- Theatrical release poster
- Directed by: Hans Matos Camac
- Written by: Hans Matos Camac
- Produced by: Julia Gamarra Hinostroza
- Starring: Max Huiza
- Cinematography: Mario Bassino
- Edited by: Hans Matos Camac
- Music by: Liberato Kani; Contusión Cerebral; César Cámac; Eduardo Ferré Paz
- Production company: Myxomatosis Kino
- Distributed by: LABPCA (Worldwide distribution), V&R Films (Theatrical release Peru)
- Release dates: August 4, 2022 (Lima); September 8, 2022 (Peru)
- Running time: 79 minutes
- Country: Peru
- Language: Spanish

Bantamweight (Spanish: Peso gallo) is a 2022 Peruvian sports drama film written, edited and directed by Hans Matos Camac. Starring Max Huiza accompanied by Ángela Huamán, Benjamín Baltazar, Gilmer Briceño, Rosalía Clemente and Melvin Quijada. It is about Enrique who is a teenage boxer who is invited to participate in a national boxing championship where he will understand that he must not only fight outside the ring to fulfill his dreams.

== Synopsis ==
Max Huiza, a teenage boxer who lives in Huancayo with his grandmother, Digna. The coach asks him to bring his identification document to register him and represent his city in a national championship. For Enrique, this simple request will become a problem and, in turn, he will understand that the fight for his dreams is not only within the ring.

== Cast ==
- Max Huiza as Enrique
- Ángela Huamán as Ángela
- Gilmer Briceño as Coach
- Rosalía Clemente as Digna
- Melvin Quijada as Víctor
- Benjamín Baltazar

== Release ==
Bantamweight had its world premiere on August 4, 2022, at the 26th Lima Film Festival. It was commercially released on September 8, 2022, in Peruvian theaters.

== Accolades ==
Year	Award / Festival	Category	Recipient	Result	Ref.
2022	26th Lima Film Festival	Made in Peru - Audience Award	Bantamweight	Nominated	
2022	26th Lima Film Festival	PUCP Community Award - Honorable Mention	Bantamweight	Won	
2023	18th Luces Awards	Best Film	Bantamweight	Nominated	
2023	18th Luces Awards	Best Actor	Max Huiza	Nominated	
2023	14th APRECI Awards	Best Supporting Actor	Melvin Quijada	Nominated	
2023	14th APRECI Awards	Best Supporting Actress	Rosalía Clemente	Nominated	
2023	10th Trujillo Film Festival	Best Fiction Feature Film	Bantamweight	Won	
2023	10th Trujillo Film Festival	Special Mention for Acting Performance	Rosalía Clemente Tacza	Won	
