= Long Distance (2019 film) =

- Theatrical release poster
- Directed by: Franco Finocchiaro
- Written by: Jorge Ossio Seminario; Franco Finocchiaro
- Produced by: Samantha Dashiel; Jimena Hospina; Guillermo Vasquez
- Starring: Miguel Iza
- Cinematography: Christian Valera
- Edited by: Gino Moreno
- Music by: Karin Zielinski
- Production companies: Candu Films; Plot Point Films
- Release dates: August 12, 2019 (Lima); February 10, 2022 (Peru)
- Running time: 80 minutes
- Country: Peru
- Language: Spanish

Long Distance (Spanish: Larga distancia) is a 2019 Peruvian comedy-drama film directed and co-written by Franco Finocchiaro, in his directorial debut. Jorge Ossio Seminario is the other co-writer of the film starring Miguel Iza.

== Synopsis ==
Astronauts, vampires and giant monsters destroying cities? What do these characters have in common? Well, Miguel, a fanciful office worker who has had his life on hold since Isabel, his wife, left him. However, he prefers to tell everyone that it is a temporary separation. He spends his days in an apartment with his daughter Camila, a withdrawn teenager whom he tries to get closer to but never fully understands.

One day, in Miguel's work center, it is announced that the worker with the highest sales quota at the end of the year will be rewarded with two tickets to any part of the world. Miguel sets out to win this prize to save his job and go to Isabel's. On the other hand, her teenage daughter Camila navigates an awkward and innocent love triangle between a confused skateboarder and her best friend.

== Cast ==
The actors participating in this film are:

- Miguel Iza as Miguel
- Valquiria Huerta as Camila
- Fiorella Pennano as Nina
- Victor Prada
- Denisse Arreguí
- Diego Pérez
- Ximena Palomino

== Financing ==
The film won the DAFO 2018 Post-Production Contest to start post-production.

== Release ==
Long Distance had an initial premiere on August 12, 2019, at the 23rd Lima Film Festival. The film was scheduled to be released in May 2020 in Peruvian theaters, but it was canceled due to the COVID-19 pandemic. In December 2021, it was announced that the film would be released commercially on January 20, 2022, but was delayed again until February 10 of the same year.

== Reception ==
=== Box office ===
During its three weeks in Peruvian theaters, the film sold 1,308 tickets.

=== Accolades ===
Year	Award / Festival	Category	Recipient	Result	Ref.
2019	23rd Lima Film Festival	Audience Award	Long Distance	Nominated	
2023	18th Luces Award	Best Film	Long Distance	Nominated	
2023	18th Luces Award	Best Actor	Miguel Iza	Nominated	
