= Malambo, the Good Man =

2018 Argentine drama film

- Film poster
- Directed by: Santiago Loza
- Written by: Santiago Loza
- Release dates: 16 February 2018 (Berlin); 3 May 2018 (Argentina)
- Running time: 71 minutes
- Country: Argentina
- Language: Spanish

Malambo, the Good Man (Spanish: Malambo, el hombre bueno) is a 2018 Argentine black-and-white drama film directed by Santiago Loza. It was screened in the Panorama section at the 68th Berlin International Film Festival.

A malambo dancer prepares all his life for the competition at the National Malambo Festival. By the tradition of the Festival, winners can no longer compete. The film is a semi-documentary fictional narration about the experience of competitive malambo dancers.
