= The Legend of the Last Inca =

- Theatrical release poster
- Directed by: Tito Catacora
- Written by: Óscar Catacora
- Produced by: Tito Catacora
- Starring: Edwin F. Riva; Maribet Berrocal
- Cinematography: Julio Gonzales; Tito Catacora
- Edited by: Tito Catacora
- Production company: Cine Aymara Studios
- Release dates: August 10, 2024 (Lima); October 2, 2025 (Peru)
- Running time: 106 minutes
- Country: Peru
- Languages: Aymara; Quechua; Spanish

The Legend of the Last Inca (Spanish: Los indomables, lit. 'The indomitables'; it was later retitled as Los Indomables: El último Inca, lit. 'The Indomitables: The last Inca') is a 2024 Peruvian historical drama film produced, edited and directed by Tito Catacora and written by Óscar Catacora. Starring Edwin F. Riva and Maribet Berrocal, it follows the Amaru-Kataristas Aymara rebellion organized by Sapa Inca and Gregoria Apaza against the Spanish conquerors for the liberation of the indigenous population.

== Synopsis ==
In 1781, the Amaru-Katarista revolutionary forces occupied the southern Peruvian highlands. Sapa Inca, the last descendant of the Aymara Incas, and his wife, Gregoria, decided to continue the indigenous uprising against the Spanish oppressors. However, in a tumultuous time, an obsession with the cause of freedom, love in times of chaos, and betrayal among the brotherhood unleashed a series of tragedies.

== Cast ==
- Edwin F. Riva as Sapa Inca
- Maribet Berrocal as Gregoria Apaza
- Diego Alonzo Aguilar as Corregidor González
- Amiel Cayo as Cacique Tankara
- Fernando Ichuta as Ankuwillka
- Jean L. Jarama as Corregidor Morcillo
- Sylvia Majo as Mestizo Woman
- Francisco F. Torres as General Patricio
- Carlos Victoria as Father Leonor
- Oscar R. Yepez as Marshal Martinez

== Release ==
The film had its world premiere on August 10, 2024, at the 28th Lima Film Festival as part of the Peruvian Competition.

The film was commercially released on October 2, 2025, in Peruvian theaters.

== Accolades ==
Year	Award / Festival	Category	Recipient	Result	Ref.
2024	28th Lima Film Festival	Peruvian Competition - Best Film	The Legend of the Last Inca	Nominated	
