= Operation Condor (2022 film) =

Peruvian political thriller film

La pena máxima
- Theatrical release poster
- Directed by: Michel Gomez
- Written by: Santiago Roncagliolo
- Based on: La pena máxima by Santiago Roncagliolo
- Starring: Emanuel Soriano; Augusto Mazzarelli; Denisse Dibós; Fiorella Pennano
- Cinematography: Jose Luis Sandoval
- Production company: Shinkebenia
- Distributed by: BF Distribution
- Release date: August 25, 2022
- Running time: 110 minutes
- Country: Peru
- Language: Spanish

Operation Condor (Spanish: La pena máxima) is a 2022 Peruvian political thriller film, based on the book La pena máxima, written by Santiago Roncagliolo. The film is directed by Michel Gomez and written by Roncagliolo, and stars Emanuel Soriano, Augusto Mazzarelli, Denisse Dibós, and Fiorella Pennano.

== Plot ==
A man is assassinated in Lima during the Argentina 78 World Cup. Félix Chacaltana, an administrative employee of the government, investigates the murder and discovers an international plot of kidnapping, disappearance and torture. Felix also begins to discover the secret life of the country. Although Peru is apparently about to return to democracy, Peruvian opponents and persecuted Argentines begin to disappear in military operations throughout the city. Felix tries to report him, but no one believes him. Or maybe nobody cares because there is a World Cup. Félix doesn't know it, but he is about to lose his sexual, political and even soccer virginity.

== Cast ==
The actors participating in this film are:

- Emanuel Soriano as Félix Chacaltana
- Augusto Mazzarelli
- Denisse Dibós
- Fiorella Pennano
- Isamel Contreras
- Ursula Marmol
- Alfonso Dibós
- Sergio Paris
- Josue Cohello

== Release ==
The film premiered on August 25, 2022 in Peruvian theaters.
