= Yana-Wara =

2023 film

- Theatrical release poster
- Directed by: Óscar Catacora; Tito Catacora
- Written by: Óscar Catacora
- Produced by: Tito Catacora
- Starring: Luz Diana Mamami; Cecilio Quispe; Juan Choquehuanca; Irma D. Percca; José D. Calisaya
- Cinematography: Óscar Catacora; Tito Catacora; Julio Gonzáles F.
- Edited by: Tito Catacora
- Production company: Cine Aymara
- Distributed by: V&R Films
- Release dates: 13 August 2023 (Lima); 4 April 2024 (Peru)
- Running time: 104 minutes
- Country: Peru
- Language: Aymara
- Budget: S/500.000

Yana-Wara is a 2023 Peruvian mystery drama film written and co-directed by Óscar Catacora along with Tito Catacora. It is the posthumous work of Óscar Catacora, following his death on November 26, 2021, while filming in El Collao Province due to appendicitis. The film was selected as the Peruvian entry for the Best International Feature Film at the 97th Academy Awards and for the Best Ibero-American Film at the 39th Goya Awards. However, it failed to secure a nomination for either award.

== Synopsis ==
The communal justice system accuses 80-year-old Don Evaristo of the murder of his 13-year-old granddaughter Yana-Wara. During the hearing, everyone learns the tragic story of this young girl.

== Cast ==
- Luz Diana Mamani as Yana-Wara
- Cecilio Quispe as Don Evaristo
- Juan Choquehuanca
- Irma D. Percca
- José D. Calisaya

== Release ==
Yana-Wara had its world premiere on August 13, 2023, as part of the Fiction competition at the 27th Lima Film Festival, then screened at the 9th University of Lima Film Week on 12 November 2023. It will be part of the main competitive selection of the 27th Málaga Film Festival on March 6, 2024. Distributed by V&R Films, it was released theatrically in Peru on 4 April 2024.

== Accolades ==
Year	Award / Festival	Category	Recipient	Result	Ref.
2023	27th Lima Film Festival	Best Picture	Yana-Wara	Nominated	
2023	27th Lima Film Festival	Best Peruvian Film - First Honorable Mention	Yana-Wara	Won	
2023	9th University of Lima Film Week	National Feature Film Competition	Yana-Wara	Won	
2023	9th University of Lima Film Week	Enrique Pinilla Award	Yana-Wara	Won	
2024	15th APRECI Awards	Best Peruvian Feature Film	Yana-Wara	Won	
2024	15th APRECI Awards	Best Director	Óscar Catacora & Tito Catacora	Won	
2024	15th APRECI Awards	Best Actor	Cecilio Quispe	Nominated	
2024	15th APRECI Awards	Best Actress	Luz Diana Mamani	Nominated	
2024	15th APRECI Awards	Best Screenplay	Óscar Catacora	Won	
2024	27th Málaga Film Festival	Best Ibero-American Film	Yana-Wara	Nominated	

== See also ==
- List of submissions to the 97th Academy Awards for Best International Feature Film
- List of Peruvian submissions for the Academy Award for Best International Feature Film
