= Eternity (2017 film) =

2018 film

- Film poster
- Aymara: Wiñaypacha
- Directed by: Óscar Catacora
- Written by: Óscar Catacora
- Produced by: Tito Catacora
- Cinematography: Óscar Catacora
- Edited by: Irene Cajías
- Distributed by: Quechua Films Distribution
- Release dates: 4 August 2017 (Lima); 19 April 2018 (Peru)
- Running time: 86 minutes
- Country: Peru
- Language: Aymara

Eternity (Aymara: Wiñaypacha) is a 2017 Peruvian drama film directed by Óscar Catacora. It was selected as the Peruvian entry for the Best Foreign Language Film at the 91st Academy Awards, but it was not nominated. It is the first film to be done entirely in the Aymara language.

== Plot ==
An elderly couple, Willka (Vicente Catacora, the grandfather of the director) and Phaxsi (Rosa Nina) preserve their religion and traditions in a remote region of the Andes. After the emigration of their only son, they are left abandoned. Despite this, they never lose hope and wait for him to return.

== See also ==
- List of submissions to the 91st Academy Awards for Best Foreign Language Film
- List of Peruvian submissions for the Academy Award for Best Foreign Language Film
