= The Journey of Javier Heraud =

- Theatrical release poster
- Directed by: Javier Corcuera
- Written by: Javier Corcuera
- Cinematography: Mariano Agudo
- Music by: Pauchi Sasaki
- Production companies: Quechua Films Perú; La Mula. Pe; Tamboura Films, S.L.U.
- Release date: August 22, 2019
- Running time: 96 minutes
- Countries: Peru; Spain
- Language: Spanish

The Journey of Javier Heraud (Spanish: El viaje de Javier Heraud) is a 2019 Peruvian-Spanish biographical documentary film written and directed by Javier Corcuera.

== Synopsis ==
The documentary is a portrait of the Peruvian poet and guerrilla fighter Javier Heraud, who died at the age of 21 in Madre de Dios, a town in the Peruvian jungle, through the information and documents possessed by Ariarca Otero, Heraud's great-niece.

== Release ==
The film opened the 23rd Lima Film Festival on August 22, 2019. It was released on August 22, 2019 in Peruvian theaters.
