= Brief Story from the Green Planet =

2019 science-fiction adventure film

- Film poster
- Spanish: Breve historia del planeta verde
- Directed by: Santiago Loza
- Written by: Santiago Loza
- Produced by: Paulo Carvalho; Ángeles Hernández; David Matamoros; Luana Melgaço; Constanza Sanz Palacios
- Starring: Romina Escobar; Paula Grinszpan; Luis Sodá
- Cinematography: Eduardo Crespo
- Edited by: Iair Michel Attias; Lorena Moriconi
- Production companies: Anavilhana Filmes; Autentika Films; Constanza Sanz Palacios Films; Zentropa
- Release date: 11 February 2019 (Berlin)
- Running time: 75 minutes
- Countries: Argentina; Germany; Brazil; Spain
- Language: Spanish

Brief Story from the Green Planet (Spanish: Breve historia del planeta verde) is a 2019 internationally co-produced science fiction adventure film directed by Argentine filmmaker Santiago Loza. The film centres on Tania (Romina Escobar), a young transgender woman mourning the recent death of her grandmother, who discovers that her grandmother was taking care of an extraterrestrial alien and embarks on a quest with her longtime friends Daniela (Paula Grinszpan) and Pedro (Luis Sodá) to return the creature to where it was originally found.

The film is an international co-production between Argentina, Brazil, Germany and Spain.

The film premiered at the 2019 Berlin Film Festival, where it won the Teddy Award for best LGBTQ-themed feature film.
