= Tito Catacora =

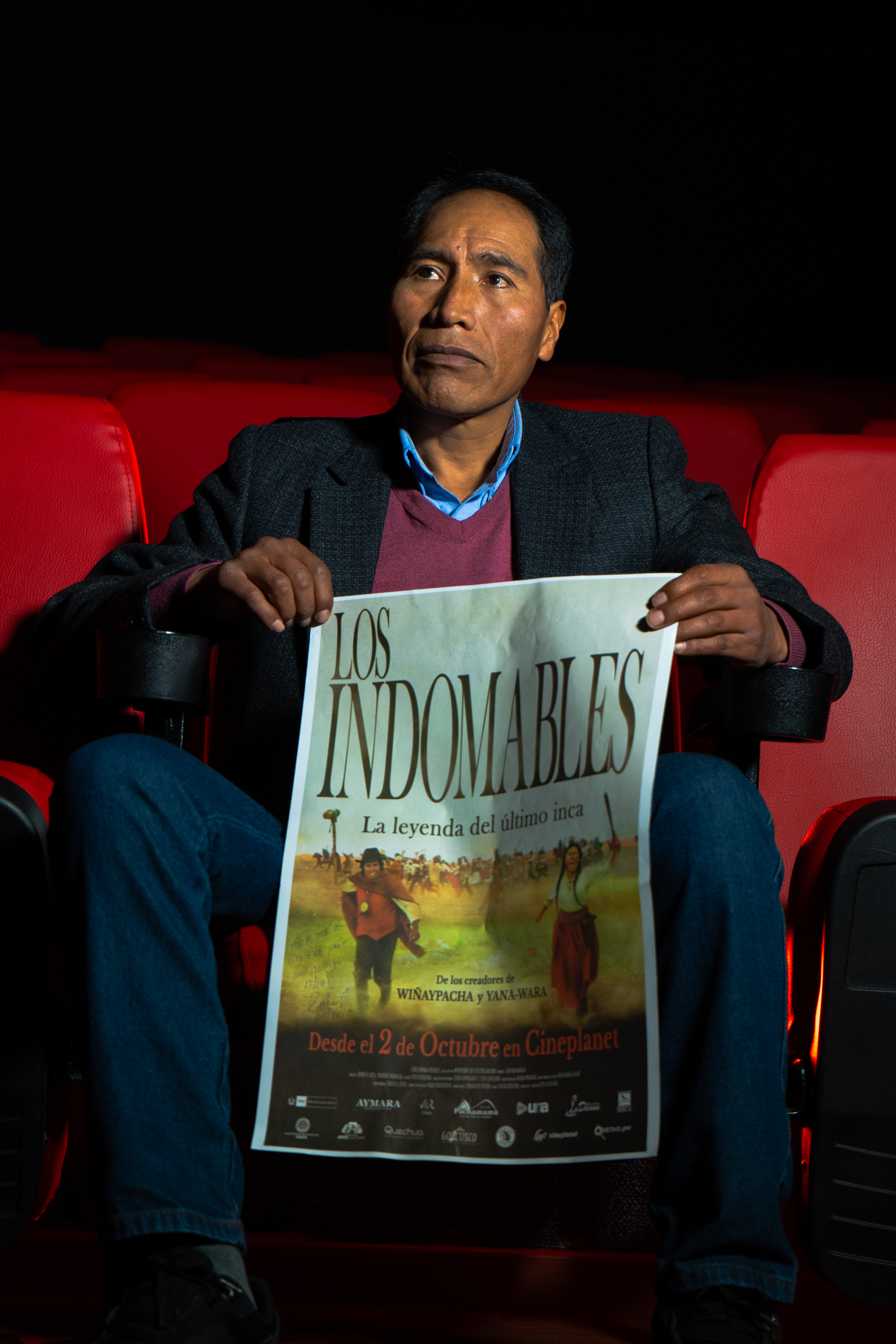
- Catacora in 2025
- Born: Tito Catacora Lope; January 25, 1974 (age 52); Ácora, Peru
- Occupations: Film director, film producer, screenwriter, cinematographer.
- Known for: Pakucha; Yana-Wara; The Legend of the Last Inca

Tito Catacora Lope (born January 25, 1974) is a Peruvian film director, film producer, screenwriter and cinematographer. He is co-founder of Cine Aymara Studios where he directed the documentary Pakucha (2021) and the historical drama The Legend of the Last Inca (2024). He also produced the drama film Eternity (2017) and Yana-Wara (2023), directed by his nephew Óscar Catacora.

== Biography ==
Tito Catacora was born in Ácora, Peru on January 25, 1974. He has a degree in Education, a master's degree in intercultural education, and has doctoral studies in Education from the National University of the Altiplano of Puno.

Before working in film, he held political positions in his region. In 2005 he was governor of the district of Ácora and, in 2006, sub-prefect of the province of Puno. Since then, he has stayed away from politics to focus on teaching and filmmaking.

He learned filmmaking on his own and with the help of his family. In 2006, while living with his nephew Óscar Catacora, he assisted him in the making of the medium-length film El sendero del Chulo. Lacking a cameraman, Tito took on that role without prior experience, learning through trial and error.

In 2007, together with his nephew, he founded the production company Cine Aymara Studios, with which they began a trajectory dedicated to exploring the Andean worldview through audiovisual language.

They both directed and produced several works, including Eternity (2017), considered the first Peruvian film spoken entirely in Aymara. The film won three awards at the Guadalajara International Film Festival in Mexico, and was selected as the Peruvian entry for the Best Foreign Language Film at the 91st Academy Awards, as well as for Best Ibero-American Film at the 33rd Goya Awards.

Following the death of Óscar Catacora in 2021, which occurred during the filming of Yana-Wara, Tito took on the responsibility of completing the feature. According to his own statements, he continued the project as a way to preserve the artistic vision he shared with his nephew. The film premiered in 2023 at the 27th Lima Film Festival as part of the Fiction competition, and was selected as the Peruvian entry for the Best International Feature Film at the 97th Academy Awards and for the Best Ibero-American Film at the 39th Goya Awards.

In 2024, he premiered The Legend of the Last Inca at the 28th Lima Film Festival as part of the Peruvian Competition.

== Filmography ==
- El sendero del Chulo (2007) - director of photography
- La venganza del Súper Cholo (2013) - director of photography
- Ch'allaña Uru (2014) - director / screenwritter
- Eternity (2017) - producer
- Pakucha (2021) - director / screenwritter / producer
- Yana-Wara (2023) - co-director / producer
- The Legend of the Last Inca (2024) - director
