= What Couples Do =

- Theatrical release poster
- Spanish: Los helechos - Enredos de parejas
- Directed by: Antolín Prieto
- Written by: Antolín Prieto; Fernanda Gutierrez
- Produced by: Luis Ramos Choqueconza; Eliana Illescas; Antolín Prieto
- Starring: Nuria Frigola Torrent; Miguel Vargas; Pedro Kanashiro; Fernanda Gutierrez; Fernando Neyra; Mariana Palau; Pold Gastello
- Cinematography: Carlos Sánchez Giraldo
- Edited by: Antolín Prieto
- Production company: Cactus Films
- Release dates: August 2018 (Lima PUCP Film Festival); June 6, 2019
- Running time: 87 minutes
- Country: Peru
- Language: Spanish

What Couples Do (Spanish: Los helechos - Enredos de parejas, lit. 'The ferns - Entanglements of couples') is a 2018 Peruvian comedy-drama film directed by Antolín Prieto (in his directorial debut) and written by Prieto & Fernanda Gutiérrez . The film uses the improvisation technique commonly seen in the theater, making it the first Peruvian film to use it. It stars Nuria Frigola Torrent, Miguel Vargas, Pedro Kanashiro, Fernanda Gutierrez, Fernando Neyra, Mariana Palau and Pold Gastello.

== Synopsis ==
Two couples flee the city for a weekend. Toshiro and Helena, married with two daughters; and Felipe and Iris, enjoying life freely in their early 30s. They all stay at a country estate run by Sol and Miguel, lovers and hippies at heart. The weekend begins with laughter and camaraderie. But as untold desires and hidden agendas are revealed, both urban pairs get into crisis. Decisions must be made and voices must be heard in this story of the incredible complexity of love in its many forms.

== Cast ==
The actors participating in this film are:

- Nuria Frigola Torrent as Iris
- Miguel Vargas as Felipe Octavio
- Pedro Kanashiro as Toshiro
- Fernanda Gutierrez as Helena
- Fernando Neyra as Miguel
- Mariana Palau as Sol
- Pold Gastello as Pisco Seller

== Release ==
The film premiered in August 2018 as part of the Official Fiction Film Competition of the 2018 Lima PUCP Film Festival. After receiving an Incentive for Film Distribution from the Ministry of Culture in 2018, the film was commercially released on June 6, 2019, in Peruvian theaters.
