= Pakucha =

- Promotional release poster
- Directed by: Tito Catacora
- Written by: Tito Catacora
- Produced by: Óscar Catacora
- Narrated by: Tomás Medina; Concepción López
- Cinematography: Óscar Catacora
- Edited by: Fabiola Sialer Cuevas; Tito Catacora
- Production company: Cine Aymara Studios
- Release date: October 22, 2021 (West Lake)
- Running time: 80 minutes
- Country: Peru
- Language: Aymara

Pakucha is a 2021 Peruvian documentary film written, co-edited and directed by Tito Catacora in his directorial debut. It follows an aymara family who gathers to celebrate the ritual of "uya ch'uwa", an ancestral custom where they evoke a ritual act to the spirit of the alpaca, Pakucha.

== Synopsis ==
In an Aymara community in the Andes of southern Peru, an alpaca family gathers to celebrate the ritual of “uywa ch'uwa”, an ancestral custom that consists of evoking ritual acts to the “Pakucha” (spirit of the alpaca). During the celebration, the entire family is guided by the worldview of the Andean culture and enters a universe full of mysticism, where the end is the genesis of a new life.

== Cast ==
- Tomás Medina
- Concepción López

== Release ==
Pakucha had its world premiere on October 22, 2021, at the 5th West Lake International Documentary Festival, then screened on April 30, 2022, at the 29th Hot Docs Canadian International Documentary Festival, on August 7, 2022, at the 26th Lima Film Festival, on October 11, 2022, at the 9th Trujillo Film Festival, on October 21, 2022, at the ImagineNATIVE Film + Media Arts Festival, and at the end of September 2024 at the 33rd Biarritz Latin American Film Festival.

== Accolades ==
Year	Award / Festival	Category	Recipient	Result	Ref.
2022	26th Lima Film Festival	Best Documentary	Pakucha	Won	
2022	26th Lima Film Festival	Ministry of Culture Jury Award for Best Peruvian Film - Honorable Mention	Pakucha	Won	
2022	9th Trujillo Film Festival	Best Documentary Feature Film	Pakucha	Nominated	
2022	9th Trujillo Film Festival	Best Documentary Feature Film - Special Jury Mention	Pakucha	Won	
2022	9th Huánuco Film Festival	Best Documentary Feature Film	Pakucha	Won	
2023	Islantilla Cinefórum Film Festival	Best Film	Pakucha	Nominated	
2023	Islantilla Cinefórum Film Festival	Best Director	Tito Catacora	Nominated	
