= Santiago Loza =

Argentine film director (born 1971)

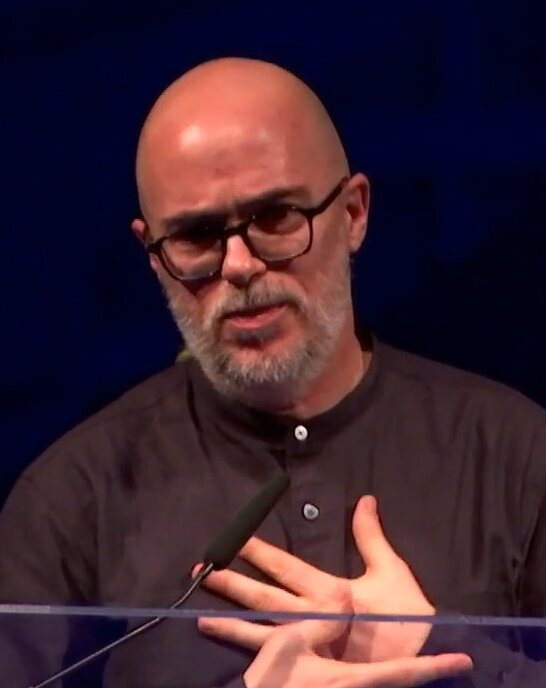
Santiago Loza - Teddy Award 2019

Santiago Loza (born April 15, 1971, in Córdoba Province, Argentina) is an Argentine film director and writer. He studied at Universidad Nacional Film School, Instituto Nacional de Cine y Artes Audiovisuales (INCAA)´s Escuela Nacional de Experimentación y Realización Cinematográfica (ENERC), and Escuela Municipal de Artes Dramáticas. In 1998, he directed the short film Lara y Los Trenes. In 2003, his first feature film, Extraño, was an Official Selection of the Rotterdam Film Festival, where it won the Tiger Award for best film. In 2008 he directed the films Artico and Rosa Patria. In 2009, his film La Invencion de la Carne was an Official Selection of the Locarno Film Festival. That same year he co-founded the Elefante Theater Club, and continues to write plays and direct films.

His film The Lips (Los Labios) won the Cannes Film Festival Un Certain Regard Award for Best Actress in 2010. In 2019, his film Brief Story from the Green Planet (Breve historia del planeta verde) won the Teddy Award for best LGBTQ-themed feature film at the 2019 Berlin Film Festival.

== Selected filmography ==
- The Lips (Los Labios) - 2010
- Malambo, the Good Man - 2018
- Brief Story from the Green Planet (Breve historia del planeta verde) - 2019
