= The Shape of Things to Come (film) =

Tiempos Futuros
- Theatrical release poster
- Spanish: Tiempos futuros
- Directed by: Victor Manuel Checa
- Written by: Victor Manuel Checa; Victor Huizar
- Produced by: Ruby Castillo; Sebastián Cordero; Christoph Hahnheiser; Josune Hahnheiser; Ángeles Hernández; Jimena Hospina; David Matamoros; Bertha Navarro; William Silva Reddington; Javier Salvador
- Starring: Fernando Bacilio; Lorenzo Molina
- Cinematography: Fergan Chávez-Ferrer
- Edited by: Miqy de la Barra
- Music by: Javi Tasio; Jose Tena Vázquez
- Production companies: Doce Entertainment; Mapimi Cine; Pierrot Films
- Release dates: November 12, 2021 (PÖFF); November 17, 2022 (Peru)
- Running time: 82 minutes
- Countries: Peru; Mexico; Ecuador; Spain; Germany
- Language: Spanish

The shape of things to come (Spanish: Tiempos futuros; lit. 'Future times') is a 2021 science fiction drama film directed by Victor Checa (in his directorial debut) and written by Víctor Checa and Victor Huizar. It stars Fernando Bacilio and Lorenzo Molina.

== Synopsis ==
In a dystopian city that appears to be Lima, Teo, an eleven-year-old boy, works with his father, Luis, in a mysterious machine that seeks to generate a deluge in a city where it does not rain. Luis, obsessed with making the machine work, puts the invention at risk in the face of constant embargoes and threats from the authorities. Teo, looking to help his father, gets involved with a gang of young spies led by twin brothers, Raiza and Baca. From this meeting, Teo will live new experiences that will question his father's obsession and reveal the hidden nature of the machine.

== Cast ==
The actors participating in this film are:

- Fernando Bacilio as Luis
- Lorenzo Molina as Teo
- Jeremi García as Baca
- Paulina Bazán as Raiza
- José Flores as Haya

== Release ==
The film premiered at the Tallinn Black Nights Film Festival in Estonia on November 12, 2021. within the section Rebels with a cause; A competitive section of the festival where films challenge the boundaries of cinema". It was commercially released on November 17, 2022 in Peruvian theaters.

== Awards ==
The film and won the Jury Award at the Beijing International Film Festival in the Forward Future section aimed at new directors. On the national circuit, it won the award for best film at the Huanuco film festival and received a mention from the jury at the Trujillo film festival. It was also part of the 2022 Silk Road International Film Festival. The film has also been shown in the Talento Emergente (Cineteca México), which showcases an outstanding selection of first films from around the world. In 2023, the film was also selected at Locarno Film Festival as a part of the Open Doors Screenings section.
