= Óscar Catacora =

Peruvian filmmaker (1987–2021)

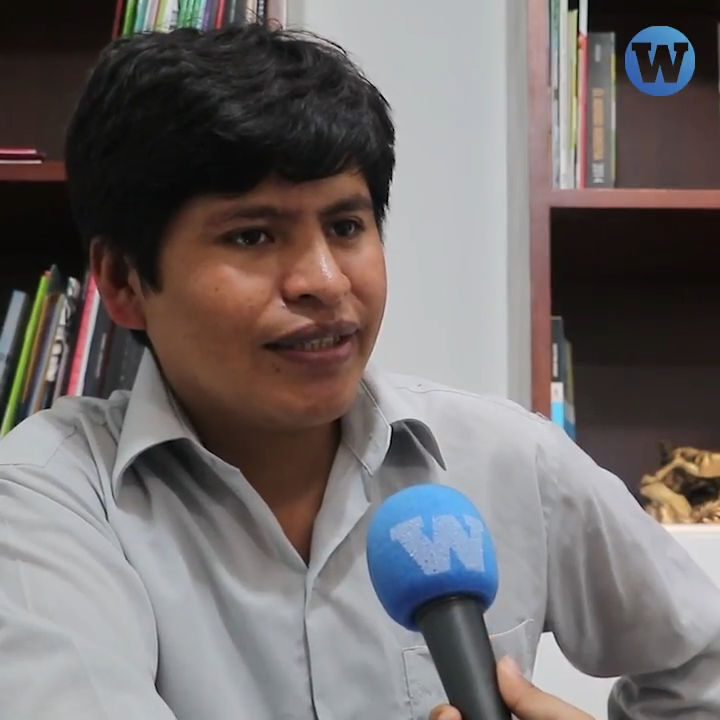
- Catacora in 2021
- Born: Óscar Quispe Catacora; 18 August 1987; Ácora, Peru
- Died: 26 November 2021 (aged 34); El Collao, Peru
- Occupations: Film director, screenwriter, cinematographer.
- Years active: 2007–2021
- Known for: Wiñaypacha; Yana-Wara

Óscar Catacora (18 August 1987 – 26 November 2021) was a Peruvian film director, screenwriter, producer and cinematographer. He is known for writing and directing the drama films Eternity and Yana-Wara. He also produced and filmed the documentary Pakucha and wrote the historical drama The Legend of the Last Inca both directed by Tito Catacora.

== Biography ==
Catacora was born on 18 August 1987 in the town of Ácora, Department of Puno. In 2007 he directed and acted in the medium-length film El sendero del chulo. Two years later he entered the Professional School of Arts at the Universidad Nacional del Altiplano de Puno (UNA) to specialise in Theatre, but eventually dropped out to enlist in the Peruvian Army.

In 2011 he began studying Social Communication Sciences at the UNA with the aim of specialising in audiovisual production. Two years later, in 2013, he wrote and directed La venganza del Súper Cholo (2013). That same year Catacora won a grant of 400,000 soles from the Peruvian Ministry of Culture in the National Film Competition to carry out his project Wiñaypacha. The film – "the first Peruvian feature film shot entirely in Aymara" – is his debut feature and was presented by Peru as a national candidate for the Oscars in Hollywood as Best International Feature Film, also aspiring as a candidate for best Ibero-American film at the 33rd edition of the Goya Awards in Spain. It won the 2018 award for Best Peruvian Feature Film from the Peruvian Film Press Association (APRECI).

In 2018, he again obtained funding from the Ministry of Culture that would allow him to make his second feature film, a historical film about the indigenous rebellion that took place in southern Peru in 1780 and whose presentation is scheduled to coincide with the Peruvian Bicentennial celebration.

On 26 November 2021, the production company Cine Aymara announced the death of Catacora during the filming of his new film Yana-Wara in El Collao Province due to appendicitis.

== Filmography ==
- El sendero del chulo (2007)
- La venganza del Súper Cholo (2013)
- Aventura sangrienta (2017)
- Wiñaypacha (2017) - feature film directorial debut
- Pakucha (2021) - only producer
- Yana-Wara (2023) - posthumous work / co-directed by Tito Catacora
- The Legend of the Last Inca (2024) - only screenwriter

== Accolades ==
Awards for Best Young Director, Best First Film and Best Cinematography at the Guadalajara International Film Festival (2018) for Wiñaypacha.
