= 24th Lima Film Festival =

2020 film festival

- Official poster of the 24th Lima Film Festival
- Location: Lima, Peru
- Founded: 1997
- Awards: Trophy Spondylus: The Fever
- Directors: Marco Mühletaler
- Festival date: 21–30 August 2020
- Website: festivaldelima.com

Lima Film Festival
- 25th 23rd

The 24th Lima Film Festival, organized by the Pontifical Catholic University of Peru, took place from 21 to 30 August 2020 in Lima, Peru. The awards were announced on 30 August 2020, with The Fever winning the Trophy Spondylus.

== Background ==
On June 8, 2020, the Lima Film Festival announced that its twenty-fourth edition would be held virtually through its digital platforms. This decision was made in response to the state of emergency and health measures imposed due to the COVID-19 pandemic in Peru. The festival took place in a reduced format from August 21 to 30. On July 24, 2020, the official announcement was made under the title "En Casa", with the motto "#LatinCinemaConnectsUs" (Spanish: #ElCineLatinoNosConecta). Organized by the Pontifical Catholic University of Peru and presented by the BBVA Foundation in Peru, a pre-sale of tickets was made available from August 10 to 14, 2020.

As part of the festival, renowned French filmmaker Olivier Assayas was announced as the special guest. Assayas conducted a masterclass and a retrospective of his own films was showcased as part of the festival's activities.

== Juries ==
=== In Competition ===
==== Fiction ====
- Melina León, Peruvian filmmaker - Jury President
- Lila Avilés, Mexican filmmaker
- Leticia Cristi, Argentine producer
- Lúcia Murat, Brazilian filmmaker

American filmmaker Alexander Payne was slated to participate as a member of the Jury, but the festival decided to suspend the collaboration due to allegations of sexual abuse.

==== Cinematography ====
- Pili Flores-Guerra, Peruvian cinematographer - Jury President
- Hugo Colace, Argentine cinematographer
- Heloisa Passos, Brazilian cinematographer

==== Documentary ====
- Lorena Best, Peruvian filmmaker - Jury President
- Wolney Oliveira, Brazilian filmmaker
- Megham Monsour, Mexican film program director

=== International Critics ===
- Claudia Puig, American journalist - Jury President
- Melvin Ledgard
- Paula Vázquez

=== Ministry of Culture of Peru ===
- Fabiola Figueroa
- Oscar Sánchez
- Jesús Solari

== Official Selection ==
The lineup of titles selected for the official selection include:

=== In Competition ===
==== Fiction ====
Highlighted title indicates award winner.

English Title	Original Title	Director(s)	Production Countrie(s)
One in a Thousand	Las mil y una	Clarisa Navas	Argentina; Germany
Emilia		César Sodero	Argentina
The Care of Others	El cuidado de los otros	Mariano González	Argentina
The Fever	A febre	Maya Da-Rin	Brazil; France; Germany
My Name Is Baghdad	Meu nome é Bagdá	Caru Alves de Souza	Brazil
White on White	Blanco en blanco	Théo Court	Chile; Spain; Germany; France
Some Beasts	Algunas bestias	Jorge Riquelme Serrano	Chile
Dogwashers	Lavaperros	Carlos Moreno	Colombia
August	Agosto	Armando Capó	Cuba; Costa Rica; France
The Ghosts	Los fantasmas	Sebastián Lojo	Guatemala; Argentina
Identifying Features	Sin señas particulares	Fernanda Valadez	Mexico; Spain
Summer White	Blanco de verano	Rodrigo Ruiz Patterson	Mexico
Powerful Chief	Manco Cápac	Henry Vallejo	Peru
The Restoration	La restauración	Alonso Llosa	Peru
Samichay, In Search of Happiness	Samichay	Mauricio Franco Tosso	Peru

==== Documentary ====
Highlighted title indicates award winner.

English Title	Original Title	Director(s)	Production Countrie(s)
The Frogs	Las ranas	Edgardo Castro	Argentina
I Owe You a Letter About Brazil	Fico te devendo uma carta sobre o Brasil	Carol Benjamin	Brazil
Faith and Fury	Fé e Fúria	Marcos Pimentel	Brazil
The Mole Agent	El agente topo	Maite Alberdi	Chile; United States; Germany; Holland; Spain
Dopamine	Dopamina	Natalia Imery	Colombia; Uruguay; Argentina
In a Whisper	A media voz	Heidi Hassan & Patricia Pérez Fernández	Cuba
Maricarmen		Sergio Morkin	Mexico
Things We Dare Not Do	Cosas que no hacemos	Bruno Santamaria	Mexico
Circle of Chalk	Círculo de tiza	Jean Alcócer & Diana Daf Collazos	Peru
Soldier's Women	Mujer de soldado	Patricia Wiesse Risso	Peru
The Song of the Butterflies	El canto de las mariposas	Nuria Frigola	Peru
Volver a vivir		Wilfredo Medina	Peru
Once Upon a Time in Venezuela	Érase una vez en Venezuela	Anabel Rodríguez Ríos	Venezuela

=== Samples ===
==== France in Peru: Olivier Assayas ====
In collaboration with the Embassy of France in Peru and the Regional Audiovisual Cooperation of France, the 24th Lima Film Festival presented the following showcase of the special guest Olivier Assayas:

English title	Original title	Director(s)	Production countrie(s)
Something in the Air	Après mai	Olivier Assayas	France
Irma Vep		Olivier Assayas	France
Summer Hours	L'Heure d'été	Olivier Assayas	France

== Awards ==
=== In Competition ===
==== Fiction ====
- Trophy Spondylus: The Fever by Maya Da-Rin
- Special Jury Prize: One in a Thousand by Clarisa Navas
- Best Director: Théo Court for White on White
- Best Actress: Grace Orsato for My Name Is Baghdad
- Best Actor: Jesús Luque for Powerful Chief
  - Special Mention: Adrián Rossi for White on White
- Best Screenplay: Rodrigo Ruiz Patterson & Raúl Sebastián Quintanilla for Summer White
- Best Debut: Identifying Features by Fernanda Valadez
  - Special Mention: Samichay: In Search of Happiness by Mauricio Franco Tosso
- Best Cinematography: Claudia Becerril for Identifying Features
  - Special Mention: José Alayón for White on White

==== Documentary ====
- Trophy Spondylus: Things We Dare Not Do by Bruno Santamaría
  - Special Mention: The Mole Agent by Maite Alberdi

=== Other Awards ===
- International Critics Award: One in a Thousand by Clarisa Navas
  - Special Mention: The Fever by Maya Da-Rin & White on White by Théo Court
- Audience Award: The Mole Agent by Maite Alberdi
- Ministry of Culture Jury Award for Best Peruvian Film: Circle of Chalk by Jean Alcócer & Diana Daf Collazos
  - Special Mention: Samichay: In Search of Happiness by Mauricio Franco Tosso
