= 25th Lima Film Festival =

2021 film festival

- Official poster of the 25th Lima Film Festival
- Opening film: Cholo
- Location: Lima, Peru
- Founded: 1997
- Awards: Trophy Spondylus: Clara Sola
- Directors: Marco Mühletaler
- Festival date: 19–29 August 2021
- Website: festivaldelima.com

Lima Film Festival
- 26th 24th

The 25th Lima Film Festival, organized by the Pontifical Catholic University of Peru, took place from 19 to 29 August 2021 in Lima, Peru. The awards were announced on 29 August 2021, with Clara Sola winning the Trophy Spondylus.

== Background ==
On July 19, 2021, the Lima Film Festival officially announced its 25th edition, celebrating its twenty-fifth anniversary under the motto "#25YearsOfLatinCinema" (Spanish: #25AñosDeCineLatino). The festival took place virtually for the second consecutive year, under the title "En Casa," from August 19 to 29, 2021. Organized by the Pontifical Catholic University of Peru and presented by the BBVA Foundation in Peru, the festival offered pre-sales from August 4 to 11 through its official website.

This edition marked the return of the sections "Made in Peru," which promotes the latest in national cinema, and "Acclaimed," showcasing the best films from the world's most important festivals. On August 4, 2021, the festival announced a tribute to the career of French director and screenwriter Laurent Cantet, along with a masterclass he offered. The film Cholo by Bernardo Batievsky opened the festival as the inaugural film, in a digitally restored presentation.

== Juries ==
=== In Competition ===
==== Fiction ====
- Mercedes Morán, Argentine actress - Jury President
- Maya Da-Rin, Brazilian filmmaker
- Alberto Ísola, Peruvian actor, director, and theater professor
- Antonio Sebire
- Fernanda Valadez, Mexican filmmaker

==== Fiction Cinematography ====
- Alejandro Legaspi, Uruguayan filmmaker - Jury President
- Claudia Becerril, Mexican cinematographer
- Paola Rizzi, Argentine cinematographer

==== Documentary ====
- Patricia Wiesse Risso, Peruvian filmmaker - Jury President
- Jordana Berg, Brazilian editor
- Bruno Santamaría, Mexican cinematographer

=== International Critics ===
- Ana Josefa Silva, Chilean journalist - Jury President
- Ivonete Pinto, Brazilian film critic
- Alberto Castro, Peruvian filmmaker

=== Ministry of Culture of Peru ===
- Rosamaría Álvarez-Gil, Peruvian filmmaker - Jury President
- Omar Forero, Peruvian filmmaker
- Milagritos Saldarriaga

=== Peruvian Association of Film Press - APRECI ===
- Rodrigo Portales - Jury President
- Jacqueline Fowks
- Juan Carlos Ugarelli

=== Monseñor Luciano Metzinger Communicators Association - APC Signis Peru ===
- Javier Portocarrero - Jury President
- Mary Ann Lynch
- María Rosa Lorbes

=== Chronicles of Diversity ===
- Clarisa Navas - Jury President
- Bruno Montenegro
- Natalia Imery
- Erika Monsalve
- Roberto Fiesco

== Official Selection ==
The lineup of titles selected for the official selection include:

=== In Competition ===
==== Fiction ====
Highlighted title indicates award winner.

English Title	Original Title	Director(s)	Production Countrie(s)
The Dog Who Wouldn't Be Quiet	El perro que no calla	Ana Katz	Argentina
The Siamese Bond	Las siamesas	Paula Hernández	Argentina
The New Girl	La chica nueva	Micaela Gonzalo	Argentina
Memory House	Casa de antiguidades	João Paulo Miranda Maria	Brazil; France
Madalena		Madiano Marcheti	Brazil
La Verónica		Leonardo Medel	Chile
Amparo		Simón Mesa Soto	Colombia; Sweden; Qatar
Longing Souls	El alma quiere volar	Diana Montenegro	Colombia; Brazil
Clara Sola		Nathalie Álvarez Mesén	Costa Rica; Belgium; Sweden
Prayers for the Stolen	Noche de fuego	Tatiana Huezo	Mexico; Germany; Brazil; Qatar
50 or Two Whales Meet on the Beach	50 (o Dos ballenas se encuentran en la playa)	Jorge Cuchí	Mexico
The Best Families	Las mejores familias	Javier Fuentes-León	Peru; Colombia
Autoerotic	Autoerótica	Andrea Hoyos	Peru
LXI (61)		Rodrigo Moreno del Valle	Peru
Liborio		Nino Martínez Sosa	Dominican Republic; Puerto Rico; Qatar

==== Documentary ====
Highlighted title indicates award winner.

English Title	Original Title	Director(s)	Production Countrie(s)
Splinters	Esquirlas	Natalia Garayalde	Argentina
The Last Forest	A última floresta	Luiz Bolognesi	Brazil
Threshold	Limiar	Coraci Ruiz	Brazil
Secrets from Putumayo	Segretos de Putumayo	Aurélio Michiles	Brazil
The Sky Is Red	El cielo está rojo	Francina Carbonell	Chile
Songs that Flood the River	Cantos que inundan el río	Germán Arango Rendón	Colombia
Rebel Objects	Objetos rebeldes	Carolina Arias Ortiz	Costa Rica; Colombia
Option Zero	La opción cero	Marcel Beltrán	Cuba; Brazil
Songs of Repression	Undertrykkelsens sang	Marianne Hougen-Moraga & Estephan Wagner	Denmark; Chile; Netherlands
The Silence of the Mole	El silencio del topo	Anaïs Taracena	Guatemala
A Cop Movie	Una película de policías	Alonso Ruizpalacios	Mexico
The Night Flowers	Las flores de la noche	Eduardo Esquivel & Omar Robles	Mexico
I'll Wait Until They Call My Name	Esperaré aquí hasta oír mi nombre	Héctor Gálvez	Peru
Veins of the Amazon	Odisea amazónica	Álvaro & Diego Sarmiento	Peru
Only the Ocean Between Us	Solo el mar nos separa	Christy Cauper Silvano; Karoli Bautista Pizarro; Khaldiya Amer Ali; Marah Mohammad Alkhateeb	Peru; Jordan; United States

==== Made in Peru ====
Space dedicated to showcasing Peruvian films in their absolute premiere.

Highlighted title indicates award winner.

English title	Original title	Director(s)	Production countrie(s)
In Between Invented Trees	Entre estos árboles que he inventado	Martín Rebaza Ponce de León	Peru
There is No Way Back Home	No hay regreso a casa	Yaela Gottlieb	Peru
Hatun Phaqcha, The Healing Land	Hatun phaqcha, tierra sana	Delia Ackerman	Peru

=== Samples ===
==== Opening film ====
English title	Original title	Director(s)	Production countrie(s)
Cholo		Bernardo Batievsky	Peru

==== Acclaimed ====
The most highly anticipated auteur cinema of the last two years worldwide: Cannes, Berlin, and Venice. A list of films selected for the 'Acclaimed' lineup is as follows:

English title	Original title	Director(s)	Production countrie(s)
First Cow		Kelly Reichardt	United States
This Is Not a Burial, It's a Resurrection		Lemohang Jeremiah Mosese	Lesotho
La civil		Teodora Mihai	Mexico
There Is No Path	No hay camino	Heddy Honigmann	Netherlands
Dear Comrades!	Dorogie tovarishchi	Andrei Konchalovsky	Russia

== Awards ==
=== In Competition ===
==== Fiction ====
- Trophy Spondylus: Clara Sola by Nathalie Álvarez Mesén
  - First Special Mention: Autoerotic by Andrea Hoyos
  - Second Special Mention: Cast of Liborio by Nino Martínez Sosa
  - Third Special Mention: Cast of Longing Souls by Diana Montenegro
- Special Jury Prize: The Dog Who Wouldn't Be Quiet by Ana Katz
- Best Director: Nino Martínez Sosa for Liborio
- Best Actress: Wendy Chinchilla Araya for Clara Sola
- Best Actor: Antônio Pitanga for Memory House
- Best Screenplay: Gonzalo Delgado & Ana Katz for The Dog Who Wouldn't Be Quiet
- Best Debut: Madalena by Madiano Marcheti
- Best Cinematography: Sophie Winqvist for Clara Sola

==== Documentary ====
- Trophy Spondylus: Limiar by Coraci Ruiz
  - First Special Mention: The Sky Is Red by Francina Carbonell
  - Second Special Mention: Splinters by Natalia Garayalde

==== Made in Peru ====
- PUCP Community Award for Made in Peru Best Film: Hatun Phaqcha, The Healing Land by Delia Ackerman

=== Other Awards ===
- International Critics Award: Amparo by Simón Mesa Soto
  - Special Mention: The Dog Who Wouldn't Be Quiet by Ana Katz
- Audience Award: Hatun Phaqcha, The Healing Land by Delia Ackerman
- Ministry of Culture Jury Award for Best Peruvian Film: Veins of the Amazon by Álvaro & Diego Sarmiento
  - Special Mention: Hatun Phaqcha, The Healing Land by Delia Ackerman
- Peruvian Association of Film Press - APRECI Award for Best Film in Competition: Prayers for the Stolen by Tatiana Huezo
  - Special Mention: The New Girl by Micaela Gonzalo
- APC Signis Peru - Monseñor Luciano Metzinger Communicators Association Award: Prayers for the Stolen by Tatiana Huezo
- Gio Award: Limiar by Coraci Ruiz
