= Héctor Abad Gómez =

Colombian medical doctor, university professor and human rights leader

- Born: 1921; Jericó, Colombia
- Died: 25 August 1987 (aged 66); Medellín, Colombia
- Cause of death: Assassination
- Education: University of Antioquia; University of Minnesota
- Occupations: Medical doctor, university professor, journalist, and human rights leader
- Political party: Colombian Liberal Party
- Children: Six, including Héctor Abad Faciolince
- Medical career
- Institutions: University of Antioquia

Héctor Abad Gómez (1921 – August 25, 1987) was a Colombian medical doctor, university professor, and human rights leader who founded the Colombian National School of Public Health. He developed practical public health programs for the poor in Medellín, where he particularly advocated for quality water, vaccinations, and human rights for the poor. He was characterised by his humanist views.

Abad is known for saying "the murderers don't know how to do: to use words to express the truth – a truth that will last longer than their lie." For his views and perceived leftist ideas, Abad was murdered in August 1987 by paramilitary groups.

== Early life and education ==
Héctor Abad Gómez was born in 1921 in Jericó, Antioquia, as the eldest of five children. His father was a merchant and amateur journalist who held liberal ideas. The family relocated to Seville, Valle del Cauca during the 1930s crisis in Colombia. In Seville, Abad attended the General Santander Educational Institution whose director was José María Velasco Ibarra, former President of Ecuador who was in exile in Colombia. Velasco Ibarra greatly influenced Abad, who was exposed to European ideas. He first social activist work was in 1938 when he organised a strike with five students against admission exams for entrance into university. At 18 years old, his family moved to Medellín, just north of Jericó, where Abad entered the School of Medicine at the University of Antioquia (UdeA). He had become interested in social medicine due to him witnessing the death of children from diphtheria.

As a student since secondary school, Abad worked as a journalist for the literary magazine Simiente. As a student at UdeA, he founded with several other classmates the student newspaper U-235 in 1945. His advocacy for improved healthcare led to him being branded a "communist". After the death of a classmate and neighbours from typhoid fever, Abad initiated a debate on Colombia's poor water quality through U-235. This led to opening a campaign for improved water quality with the municipal council. The topic of water quality was used in his undergraduate thesis "Some considerations on Public Health in the Department of Antioquia" (Spanish: Algunas consideraciones sobre la Salud Pública en el Departamento de Antioquia). Abad pursued further education in the United States at the University of Minnesota, where he specialised in public health and received his Master of Public Health in 1948.

== Political advocacy and assassination ==
In 1987, Abad became a pre-candidate of the Colombian Liberal party for Mayor of Medellín for the 1988 election. He was also the president of the Human Rights Committee in Antioquia from 1982 to his death. Abad voiced his views and denouncement of socioeconomic inequality and violence in Colombia through the radio, and was also a columnist for El Mundo and El Tiempo.

In August 1987, the number of professors and students at the UdeA increased, mainly at the direction of Carlos Castaño Gil and his paramilitary groups. Along with 22 others, Abad was on a death list by the paramilitaries. On 13 August 1987, Abad helped organise with Pedro Luis Valencia, Luis Felipe Vélez and Leonardo Betancur Taborda the 'March of the Red Carnations'. The march consisted of 3,000 students and professors from the UdeA, who protested against the systematic violence against students and professors who sympathised with leftish ideas. All four men were killed by the end of August: Valencia was shot on the 14th, and Vélez, Betancur and Abad on the 25th. Following Valencia's death, Abad demanded action from the authorities against violence committed by paramilitary groups.

The violence did not stop. Vélez was murdered around 7:30 a.m. by a paramilitary group on 25 August 1987 in front of the headquarters of the Association of Teachers of Antioquia (ADIDA) in Medellín. Through the Human Rights Committee, Abad issued a statement of repudiation. After 5 p.m., Abad and Betancur walked to the Casa del Maestro for Vélez's wake. However, Vélez's body had already been moved. Subsequently, two hitmen arrived on a motorbike and shot at Abad six times at the building's door. Betancur was killed in the kitchen. Following his death, Abad's son Héctor fled back to Italy for fear of his own life.

== Personal life ==
Abad was married to Cecilia Faciolince García. Together they had five daughters - Mariluz, Clara, Eva, Marta and Sol - and one son - Héctor. At age 16, Marta died of melanoma, deeply affecting Abad and strengthening his sense of social justice. Abad enjoyed growing and cultivating roses.

== El olvido que seremos (2006; t. Oblivion: A Memoir) ==
"Oblivion: A Memoir" by Héctor Abad Faciolince, is a memoir written about the author's father, Hector Abad Gomez. It discusses the life and the circumstances of Gomez's murder by paramilitaries. Ashley McNelis from the Bomb Magazine, describes the book as "...an honest and thorough reflection on a man's life from his son's perspective that also considers the private sphere of the family and the political turbulence in Colombia in the 1980s."

== Literary works ==
- Manual de tolerancia (1988)

== See also ==
- Forgotten We'll Be
