= Lima Is Burning =

Lima is Burning
- Theatrical release poster
- Directed by: Alberto Castro
- Written by: Alberto Castro
- Produced by: Alberto Castro; Nevenka Yanovich
- Cinematography: Renzo Rivas
- Edited by: Andrés Becerra
- Music by: Karin Zielinski
- Production company: Arde Lima Cine
- Distributed by: Tondero Distribución
- Release dates: November 15, 2023 (University of Lima Film Week); May 30, 2024 (Peru)
- Running time: 87 minutes
- Country: Peru
- Language: Spanish

Lima Is Burning (Spanish: Arde Lima) is a 2023 Peruvian documentary film written, co-produced and directed by Alberto Castro. It follows the personal and professional lives of a group of Peruvian drag queens in a still very conservative country. It is the third film of Castro's documentary trilogy about LGBTIQ+ in Peru following Drag Invasion (2020) and Salir del clóset (2022).

== Synopsis ==
Fifteen drag artists face a still very conservative Peruvian society, in heels, with bright dresses and well-placed wigs. These multicolored, radiant and multi-talented characters defend the freedom to be oneself, express oneself and dress freely, while along the way they reveal family fissures, unconditional friendships and dreams in the making.

== Cast ==
The documentary features the testimonies of:

- Tany de la Riva
- Georgia Hart
- La Langosta
- Harmonik Minaj
- Go Diva
- Dark Princess
- Alezz Andro
- Ernesto Pimentel
- Stacy Malibú
- Tía Tula
- Brit de Rapert
- Cristina Corazón
- La Funky
- Petra
- Cakutty

== Release ==
It had its world premiere on November 15, 2023, at the 9th University of Lima Film Week, then was commercially released on May 30, 2024, in Peruvian theaters.
