= Autoerotic =

Autoerotic may refer to:

- Autoeroticism, the practice of becoming sexually stimulated through internal stimuli
- Erotic target location errors (ETLEs), a class of sexual interests in which sexual arousal depends on imagining one's self in another form, such as an animal, child, or the other sex
- Autoerotic (2011 film), a film by Joe Swanberg
- Autoerotic (2021 film), a Peruvian coming-of-age drama film
