= Rafael Cepeda Torres =

Colombian architect (1925–2009)

- Born: 28 October 1925
- Died: 9 September 2009 (aged 83)
- Education: Pontifical Bolivarian University
- Occupation: Architect
- Children: 6
- Relatives: Héctor Abad Faciolince (nephew)

Rafael Cepeda Torres (28 October 1925 – 9 September 2009) was a Colombian architect. He is best known for creating works of modern architecture in Cartagena and in the Caribbean coast of Colombia.

Cepeda Torres studied architecture at the Pontifical Bolivarian University in Medellín. An accomplished musician, he paid for his education by playing the violin at various events around the city. He belonged to such musical bodies as the Sinfónica de Antioquia and the Filarmónica de Cartagena.

As a professional architect, Cepeda Torres designed several landmarks in Cartagena: the Banco Popular, the Edificio Araújo, the Hilton Hotel and the Hotel Capilla del Mar. He also supervised the construction of key buildings such as the Centro de Convenciones, the Hospital Universitario, the Banco de Colombia in the city centre, the Edificio Suramericana and the Banco Royal. He designed several contemporary works in the vicinity of Cartagena, in the neighbourhoods of Bocagrande, Castillogrande y El Laguito. Elsewhere, he designed the Edificio de Los Bancos in Santa Marta and the Superintendencia de Sociedades building in Bogotá.

In 1950, he co-founded (with José Antonio Covo and Fulgencio Lequerica) the architecture firm Civilco. He is now regarded as one of the major modern architects of the city of Cartagena, alongside Cristian Ujueta Toscano, Raimundo Delgado Martínez and Arturo Hernández Gómez.

Cepeda Torres had five sons and a daughter. His nephew is the Colombian writer Héctor Abad Faciolince.
