= 1942 Rio de Janeiro Conference =

Deplomatic meeting of South American Nation

- Date: 15 January 1942 — 28 January 1942
- Duration: 13 days
- Outcome: Recommendation of severance of relations with the Axis powers

The 1942 Rio de Janeiro Conference was a diplomatic meeting held between 21 countries in the Americas (excluding Guyana and Suriname who were not independent at the time) from 15 to 28 January 1942, in Rio de Janeiro, Brazil,with the intention of discussing relations with the Axis Powers and economic deals. Prior to the conference, the Dominican Republic, Haiti, Cuba, Panama, Costa Rica, Nicaragua, Honduras, El Salvador, and Guatemala had all declared war on Nazi Germany, while Mexico, Colombia and Venezuela had severed relations.

The US Deputy to the Secretary of State, Sumner Welles. spearheaded the conference. The result was a recommendation of severing diplomatic and economic relations with the Axis Powers.

On January 28, Brazil joined Peru, Ecuador, Paraguay, and Uruguay in the severing of diplomatic relations with Nazi Germany.

By February 10 1942, 10 countries had declared war on Germany, 9 had served diplomatic relations, with 2 failing to live up to the agreement.
