= 9th Macondo Awards =

- Date: December 6, 2021
- Site: Cinemateca Distrital; Bogotá, Colombia

Highlights
- Best Film: Monos
- Most awards: Monos (8)
- Most nominations: Monos (13)

The 9th Macondo Awards ceremony, presented by the Colombian Academy of Cinematography Arts and Sciences, honored the best audiovisual productions of 2021. It took place on December 6, 2021, at the Cinemateca Distrital in Bogotá. The ceremony awarded 18 categories.

The film Monos won the award for Best Film.

== Winners and nominees ==
| Best Picture: Monos; Days of the Whale; Litigante; Memories of My Father | Best Director: Alejandro Landes – Monos; Carlos Moreno – Dogwashers; Franco Lolli – Litigante; Fernando Trueba – Memories of My Father |
| Best Actor: Christian Tappan – Dogwashers; Javier Cámara – Memories of My Father; Miguel González – Nowhere; Moisés Arias – Monos | Best Actress: Patricia Tamayo – Memories of My Father; Julianne Nicholson – Monos; Carolina Sanín – Litigante; Silvia Varón – Second Star on the Right |
| Best Supporting Actor: John Alex Toro – Dogwashers; Anderson Ballesteros – Dogwashers; Andrés Jiménez – Second Star on the Right; Biassini Segura – Noise | Best Supporting Actress: Sofía Buenaventura – Monos; Sharon Guzmán – Luz; Salma Tafur – Angela; Diana Wiswell – Second Star on the Right |
| Best Screenplay: Franco Lolli, Marie Amachoukeli, Virginie Legeay – Litigante; Catalina Arroyave – Days of the Whale; Alejandro Landes, Alexis Dos Santos – Monos; Nicolás Rincón Guille – Valley of Souls | Best Original Score: Mica Levi – Monos; Santiago Lozano – Después de Norma; Andrés Martínez, Carlos Osuna – El concursante; Andrés Soto – Nowhere |
| Best Original Song: Johan Paz, Marlon Pérez – from Dogwashers; Andrés Martínez, Carlos Osuna – from El concursante; Paola Barreto, David Torres Tolosa – from Irma; Daniel González, Fabio Chaves – from Second Star on the Right | Best Cinematography: Jasper Wolf – Monos; Sergio Iván Castaño – Memories of My Father; Juan Carlos Gil – Dogwashers; Juan Sarmiento – Valley of Souls |
| Best Art Direction: Diego López – Memories of My Father; Tatiana Vera– Days of the Whale; Marcela Gómez – Litigante; Daniela Schneider, Ángela Leyton – Monos | Best Editing: Andrés Porras – Dogwashers; Nicolás Desmaison, Julia Duclaux – Litigante; David Esteban Rojas, Carlos Cordero – Después de Norma; María Alejandra Briganti – Dopamine |
| Best Sound Design: Lena Esquenazi – Monos; Eduardo Castro, Octavio Rojas, César Salazar – Memories of My Father; César Salazar, Gustavo Pomeraneg, Adrián Rodríguez – Dogwashers; Alejandro Escobar, Daniel Vásquez, Sebastián Alzate – Days of the Whale | Best Visual Effects: Linus Lindbalk, The Gentleman Broncos – Monos; Luis Miguel Henao – Afuera del tiempo; Laburo Digital – Lola... drones; Juan Manuel Betancourt – Days of the Whale |
| Best Costume Design: Ana María Urrea – Memories of My Father; Juliana Hoyos – Litigante; Ana María Acosta – Dogwashers; Daniela Schneider, Johanna Buendía – Monos | Best Makeup: Andrés Ramírez, Alex Rojas – Monos; Laura Copo – Memories of My Father; Sara Victoria Cuéllar – Dogwashers; María Fernanda Silvestre – Days of the Whale |
| Best Documentary: Jorge Andrés Botero – Después de Norma; Andrés Torres – La fortaleza; Marta Rodríguez – Los Andes Symphony Orchestra; Victoria Solano – Sumercé | Audience Award for Best Film: Fortitude |

== See also ==
- List of Colombian films
- Macondo Awards
- 2021 in film
