= Dogwashers =

- Theatrical release poster
- Directed by: Carlos Moreno
- Written by: Pilar Quintana; Antonio García
- Produced by: Carlos Moreno; Ignacio Rey; Diego F. Ramírez; Rocío Gort
- Starring: Christian Tappan
- Cinematography: Juan Carlos Gil
- Edited by: Andrés Porras
- Music by: Gustavo Pomenarec
- Production company: 64-A Films
- Release dates: August 2020 (Lima); November 2020 (Huelva); 5 March 2021 (Netflix); 19 August 2021 (Colombia)
- Running time: 103 minutes
- Countries: Colombia; Argentina
- Language: Spanish

Dogwashers (Spanish: Lavaperros) is a 2020 crime black comedy-drama film directed by Carlos Moreno and written Pilar Quintana & Antonio García. Starring Christian Tappan accompanied by Anderson Ballesteros, Jhon Álex Toro, Ulises González, Leonor López, Héctor Mauricio Mejía and Johnnie Castillo.

== Synopsis ==
Don Oscar is in trouble: according to medical tests he is sterile, but his wife is pregnant; the neighboring construction workers seem dedicated to guarding his house; Duberney, the new moneylender in town, is looking for him with his thugs all over Tuluá. That is why he has decided to hide until the tide goes out. While he dedicates himself to getting bored and drunk on his dilapidated farm, the least expected person finds his latest treasure. It will be the stupefied man who cares for and washes Don Oscar's dogs, who sets out to recover the money.

== Cast ==
The actors participating in this film are:

- Christian Tappan as Don Oscar
- Jhon Álex Toro as Freddy
- Anderson Ballesteros as Milton
- Ulises González as Bobolitro
- Leonor López as Nancy
- Héctor Mauricio Mejía as Bermúdez
- Johnnie Castillo as Gamboa
- Isabella Licht Delgado as Claudia Patricia
- Marlon Pérez Cruz as Duberney
- Kevin Andrés Muñoz as Yoiner
- Hatsune Takegami as Rita
- Phanor Terás as Leónidas
- Nandy di Rosa as Jenny
- Lina Vanessa Nieto as Angie
- Karla González as Mayerly
- Geovanny Marín Cardona as The Turkish
- Jon Alex Castillo as Church Pastor
- Héctor Fabio Paredes as The Molt
- Jaime Andrés Castaño as The Freckled
- Juan Martín Aranced as Hotel Receptionist
- Ariel Martínez as Urologist
- Rodrigo Valencia as Peralta
- Marino Angulo as Caracha
- Ricardo Manuel Pérez as Taxi driver
- Carlos González Taponcho as Turkish friend

== Production ==
Principal photography lasted 8 weeks in Tuluá, Valle del Cauca, Colombia.

== Release ==
Its premiere was scheduled for mid-March 2020 at the Cartagena de Indias International Film Festival and then commercially released on April 16, 2020, in Colombian theaters, but both premieres were canceled due to the COVID-19 pandemic. Then, the film was released on March 5, 2021, on Netflix, then on August 19 of the same year it was released in Colombian theaters. Prior to its commercial release, the film participated at the end of August 2020 at the 24th Lima Film Festival, at the Warsaw Film Festival and in mid-November 2020 at the 46th Huelva Ibero-American Film Festival.

== Accolades ==
Year	Award / Festival	Category	Recipient	Result	Ref.
2020	Lima Film Festival	Best Picture	Dogwashers	Nominated	
2020	Warsaw Film Festival	Free Spirit Award	Dogwashers	Nominated	
2020	Huelva Ibero-American Film Festival	Colón de Oro	Dogwashers	Nominated	
2020	Huelva Ibero-American Film Festival	Best Screenplay	Pilar Quintana & Antonio García	Won	
2021	Macondo Awards	Best Director	Carlos Moreno	Nominated	
2021	Macondo Awards	Best Actor	Christian Tappan	Won	
2021	Macondo Awards	Best Actress	Julianne Nicholson	Nominated	
2021	Macondo Awards	Best Supporting Actor	John Alex Toro	Won	
2021	Macondo Awards	Best Supporting Actor	Anderson Ballesteros	Nominated	
2021	Macondo Awards	Best Cinematography	Juan Carlos Gil	Nominated	
2021	Macondo Awards	Best Editing	Andrés Porras	Won	
2021	Macondo Awards	Best Original Song	Johan Paz & Marlon Pérez ("Lavaperros")	Won	
2021	Macondo Awards	Best Sound Design	César Salazar, Gustavo Pomeraneg & Adrián Rodríguez	Nominated	
2021	Macondo Awards	Best Costume Design	Ana María Acosta	Nominated	
2021	Macondo Awards	Best Makeup	Sara Victoria Cuéllar	Nominated	
2021	Forqué Awards	Best Latin American Feature Film	Dogwashers	Nominated	
