= Chabuca =

- Theatrical release poster
- Directed by: Jorge Carmona
- Written by: Christopher Vazquez; Mariana Silva; Italo Cordano
- Produced by: Diego Vives León
- Starring: Sergio Armasgo
- Cinematography: Renzo Rivas
- Edited by: Eduardo 'Chino' Pinto
- Music by: Karin Zielinski
- Production company: Tondero Producciones
- Release date: April 11, 2024
- Running time: 110 minutes
- Country: Peru
- Language: Spanish

Chabuca is a 2024 Peruvian biographical drama film directed by Jorge Carmona and written by Christopher Vazquez, Mariana Silva and Ítalo Cordano. It is based on the life of Peruvian actor and drag queen Ernesto Pimentel 'Chola Chabuca'. It stars Sergio Armasgo accompanied by Haydeé Cáceres, Norka Ramirez, Miguel Dávalos, Izan Alcázar, Gina Yangali, Brando Gallessi, Alejandro Villagomez, Gerson Del Carpio and Erick Elera. Its premiered on April 11, 2024, in Peruvian theaters.

== Synopsis ==
Ernesto Pimentel, a boy raised in a modest home, faced the loss of his mother at an early age, leaving him in the care of his grandmother and uncle. Her childhood inspired the creation of La Chola CHABUCA, a character with colorful skirts and high heels who conquered the hearts of millions of homes throughout Peru. Despite the personal challenges and the revelation of his identity, Ernesto found in CHABUCA the support of his followers and the strength to pursue his deepest dream: to be a father and share love and laughter throughout the country on national television and on one of the most important circuses in the country.

== Cast ==
- Sergio Armasgo as Ernesto Pimentel 'Chola Chabuca'
- Haydeé Cáceres
- Norka Ramirez
- Miguel Dávalos
- Izan Alcázar
- Gina Yangali
- Brando Gallessi
- Alejandro Villagomez
- Gerson Del Carpio
- Erick Elera

== Production ==
Principal photography lasted 4 weeks between July and August 2023 in Lima and Arequipa.

== Accolades ==
Year	Award / Festival	Category	Recipient	Result	Ref.
2025	2024 APRECI Awards	Best Leading Actor	Sergio Armasgo	Pending	
2025	2024 APRECI Awards	Best Supporting Actor	Miguel Dávalos	Pending	
