= The Restoration (2020 film) =

La restauración
- Theatrical release poster
- Directed by: Alonso Llosa
- Written by: Alonso Llosa
- Produced by: Sherman A. Brown; J.Y. Chun; Carolina Denegri; David Figueroa García; Olga Goister; Gill Holland; Mauro Mueller; Gustavo Rosa
- Starring: Paul Vega; Attilia Boschetti; Delfina Paredes; Pietro Sibille; Muki Sabogal
- Cinematography: Sean Webley
- Music by: Katya Mihailova
- Production companies: Fidelio Films; Inferniello; Knight Shamrock Pictures
- Release dates: January 2020 (SBIFF); August 2020 (Lima); 6 October 2022 (Peru)
- Running time: 93 minutes
- Country: Peru
- Language: Spanish

The Restoration (Spanish: La restauración) is a 2020 Peruvian comedy film written and directed by Alonso Llosa in his directorial debut. It stars Paul Vega, Atilia Boschetti, Delfina Paredes, Pietro Sibille and Muki Sabogal.

== Synopsis ==
The real estate boom is making a lot of people rich. But Tato, a charismatic and immature fifty-year-old, has lost everything. He has returned to live with his eccentric mother, Rosa, who humiliates him every chance she gets in the hope of keeping him inside her decrepit mansion. Desperate for financial independence, Tato sells the house without his mother's consent. To make her believe that she still lives inside her old room, Tato places her in a vaguely similar space, covered with plastic curtains to create the illusion that the house is being restored for its historical value. How long and at what price will Tato be able to maintain this impossible farce?

== Cast ==
The actors participating in this film are:

- Paul Vega as Tato Basile
- Muki Sabogal as Inez
- Attilia Boschetti as Rosa
- Delfina Paredes as Gloria
- Pietro Sibille as Raymond

== Release ==
In January 2020, the film premiered at the Santa Barbara International Film Festival (USA). Subsequently, it screened in August 2020 at the 24th Lima Film Festival. The film was later released commercially in theaters on October 6, 2022.

== Awards ==
Year	Award / Festival	Category	Recipient	Result	Ref.
2020	24th Lima Film Festival	Best Picture	The Restoration	Nominated	
2021	12th APRECI Awards	Best Actress	Attilia Boschetti	Won	
2021	12th APRECI Awards	Best Supporting Actress	Delfina Paredes	Won	
2021	Luces Awards	Best Film	The Restoration	Nominated	
2021	Luces Awards	Best Actor	Paul Vega	Won	
2021	Luces Awards	Best Actress	Attilia Boschetti	Nominated	
2021	Luces Awards	Best Actress	Delfina Paredes	Nominated	
