= Memories of My Father =

2020 film

- Film poster
- Spanish: El olvido que seremos
- Directed by: Fernando Trueba
- Screenplay by: David Trueba
- Based on: El olvido que seremos by Hector Abad Faciolince
- Produced by: Dago García
- Starring: Javier Cámara; Nicolás Reyes Cano; Juan Pablo Urrego; Patricia Tamayo; María Teresa Barreto; Laura Londoño; Elizabeth Minotta; Kami Zea; Luciana Echeverry; Camila Zárate; Whit Stillman
- Cinematography: Sergio Iván Castaño
- Edited by: Marta Velasco
- Music by: Zbigniew Preisner
- Release date: 22 August 2020 (Colombia)
- Running time: 136 minutes
- Country: Colombia
- Language: Spanish

Memories of My Father (Spanish: El olvido que seremos), also known as Forgotten We'll Be, is a 2020 Colombian drama film directed by Fernando Trueba from a screenplay by David Trueba based on the book by Héctor Abad Faciolince. It stars Javier Cámara as Héctor Abad Gómez.

It was selected as the Colombian entry for the Best International Feature Film at the 93rd Academy Awards.

== Cast ==
- Javier Cámara as Héctor Abad Gómez
- Juan Pablo Urrego as Héctor
- Patricia Tamayo as Cecilia Faciolince
- Nicolás Reyes Cano as Quiquín (Héctor niño)
- Luciana Echeverry as Sol (niña)
- Aída Morales as Gilma
- Camila Zárate as Sol
- Whit Stillman as Dr. Richard Saunders
- Kami Zea as Marta
- María Teresa Barreto as Mariluz
- Elizabeth Minotta
- Laura Londoño

== Release ==
The film was selected to be shown at the 2020 Cannes Film Festival, which was cancelled in the wake of the onset of the COVID-19 pandemic. It was released theatrically in Colombia on 22 August 2020. It landed its international premiere at the 68th San Sebastián International Film Festival. Cohen Media Group released the film in the United States on 16 November 2022.

== Reception ==
On review aggregator website Rotten Tomatoes, the film holds an approval rating of 84% based on 31 reviews, with an average rating of 7.0/10.

== Accolades ==
Year	Award	Category	Nominee(s)	Result	Ref.
2021	35th Goya Awards	Best Ibero-American Film		Won	
2021	8th Platino Awards	Best Ibero-American Film		Won	
2021	8th Platino Awards	Best Director	Fernando Trueba	Won	
2021	8th Platino Awards	Best Actor	Javier Cámara	Won	
2021	8th Platino Awards	Best Supporting Actress	Kami Zea	Nominated	
2021	8th Platino Awards	Best Screenplay	David Trueba	Won	
2021	8th Platino Awards	Best Original Score	Zbigniew Preisner	Nominated	
2021	8th Platino Awards	Best Cinematography	Sergio Iván Castaño	Nominated	
2021	8th Platino Awards	Best Art Direction	Diego López	Won	
2021	8th Platino Awards	Best Film Editing	Marta Velasco	Nominated	
2021	8th Platino Awards	Best Sound	Eduardo Castro, Octavio Rojas y Alberto Ovejero	Nominated	
2021	8th Platino Awards	Cinema and Education in Values		Nominated	
2021	9th Macondo Awards	Best Picture		Nominated	
2021	9th Macondo Awards	Best Director	Fernando Trueba	Nominated	
2021	9th Macondo Awards	Best Actor	Javier Cámara	Nominated	
2021	9th Macondo Awards	Best Actress	Patricia Tamayo	Won	
2021	9th Macondo Awards	Best Cinematography	Sergio Iván Castaño	Nominated	
2021	9th Macondo Awards	Best Art Direction	Diego López	Won	
2021	9th Macondo Awards	Best Sound Design	Eduardo Castro, Octavio Rojas, César Salazar	Nominated	
2021	9th Macondo Awards	Best Costume Design	Ana María Urrea	Won	
2021	9th Macondo Awards	Best Makeup	Laura Copo	Nominated	

== See also ==
- List of submissions to the 93rd Academy Awards for Best International Feature Film
- List of Colombian submissions for the Academy Award for Best International Feature Film
