= The Song of the Butterflies =

- Promotional release poster
- Directed by: Núria Frigola Torrent
- Written by: Núria Frigola Torrent
- Produced by: Rolando Toledo Vega; Núria Frigola Torrent; Chela de Ferrari
- Starring: Rember Yahuarcani
- Cinematography: Nicolás Landa Tami
- Edited by: Nicolé Hurtado Céspedes
- Music by: Karin Zielinski
- Production companies: Jacalito Films; La Mula Producciones
- Release date: May 28, 2020 (Hot Docs)
- Running time: 65 minutes
- Country: Peru
- Languages: Spanish; Munuka

The Song of the Butterflies (Spanish: El canto de las mariposas) is a 2020 Peruvian documentary film written, co-produced and directed by Núria Frigola Torrent in her directorial debut. It follows Rember Yahuarcani, an indigenous plastic artist from the Witoto people, who seeks to tell the dark past that his community faced as a result of the rubber boom in Peru.

== Synopsis ==
Remember Yahuarcani is an indigenous plastic artist from the Witoto people who returns to his homeland, after passing through Lima, in search of inspiration, remembering the stories that his grandmother Martha López told him before she died. During the recording, Yahuarcani's grandmother is present through a sound file. Being one of the survivors of the "rubber massacre" (part of the rubber boom), she tells some dark passages in the history of her people in which they were enslaved, decimated and displaced to other places. Remember emphasizes the importance that these events and experiences of his ancestors cannot be forgotten, and that art has the possibility of keeping his culture alive.

== Narrators ==
- Rember Yahuarcani López
- Nereyda López
- Santiago Yahuarcani
- Martha López

== Release ==
It had its world premiere on May 28, 2020, at the Hot Docs Canadian International Documentary Festival. It was screened at the 24th Lima Film Festival on August 21, 2020, and at the 47th Seattle International Film Festival on April 9, 2021. It was broadcast on the American PBS television channel on August 30, 2021.

== Accolades ==
Year	Award / Festival	Category	Recipient	Result	Ref.
2020	24th Lima Film Festival	Best Documentary	The Song of the Butterflies	Nominated	
2020	35th Guaralajara International Film Festival	Best Documentary	The Song of the Butterflies	Won	
