= The Dream of Ariana =

- Theatrical release poster
- Directed by: Evelyne Pegot-Ogier
- Written by: Evelyne Pegot-Ogier
- Produced by: Gustavo Sánchez; Evelyne Pegot-Ogier
- Starring: Priscila Espinoza
- Cinematography: Micaela Cajahuaringa
- Edited by: Ángela Vera
- Music by: Karin Zielinski
- Production companies: Laberinto Cine y Televisión; La Soga Producciones
- Release date: February 4, 2024
- Running time: 87 minutes
- Country: Peru
- Language: Spanish

The Dream of Ariana (Spanish: El sueño de Ariana) is a 2024 Peruvian science fiction zombie horror film written, co-produced and directed by Evelyne Pegot-Ogier. It stars Priscila Espinoza accompanied by Javier Valdés, Miguel Dávalos, Gabriel Gil and Brigitte Jouannet. It premiered on February 4, 2024, at the Cultural Center of the Pontifical Catholic University of Peru.

== Synopsis ==
Ari is a student at an agronomy university. One day, during a veterinary course, the students and Muro, the teacher, witness the outbreak of an unknown virus, very similar to rabies. Ari, Muro, and their friends fight to defeat the virus, hiding from the authorities. They move to Muro's house, and Ari discovers that she has the keys to fighting the virus within her own body. She decides to volunteer for the experiments, hoping to save her friends and find the cure.

== Cast ==
- Priscila Espinoza as Ariana
- Javier Valdés as Professor Muro
- Miguel Dávalos as Carlos
- Gabriel Gil as Jano
- Brigitte Jouannet as Maca
- Alonso García as Pedro
- Christopher Gaona as Jaime
- Kelly Estrada as Ana
- Gabriela Chero as Reporter
- Fernando Pasco as Doctor Solari
- Rodrigo Palacios as Zombie hunter
- Patricia Medina as Jano's mom
- Jorge Urizar as Jano's father
- Mauricio Sotomayor as Jano's brother
- Jackie Vásquez as Ariana's mom
- Giancarlo Córdoba as University worker 1
- Christian Dañoveitia as University worker 2

== Production ==
Principal photography was scheduled to begin in July 2020, but was delayed due to the COVID-19 pandemic. Finally, filming began in October 2020 in Lima, Peru.
