= Karin Zielinski =

Peruvian musician

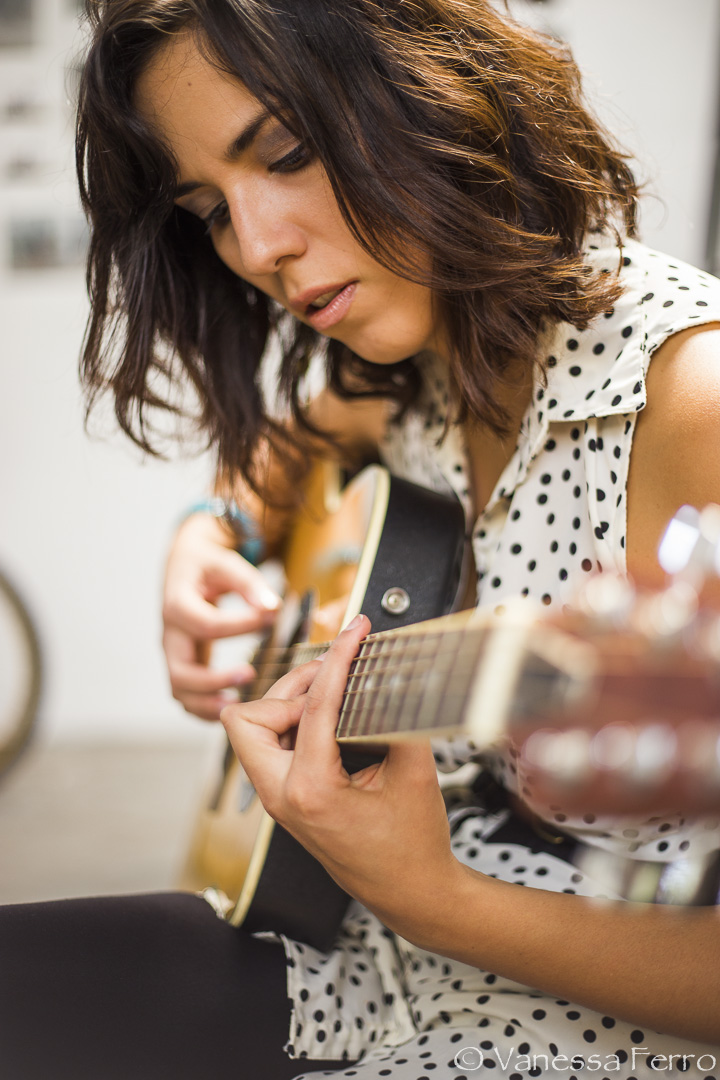
- Karin Zielinski in her study, 2014

Background information
- Born: Karin Zielinski; April 24, 1982 (age 44); Lima, Peru
- Genres: Soundtrack; rock; indie folk; pop; jazz
- Occupations: Musician; songwriter; producer; composer
- Instruments: Vocals; guitar
- Years active: 2005–present
- Website: karinzielinski.com

Karin Zielinski (Lima, Peru, April 24, 1982) is a Peruvian composer, record producer and singer who works in musical and audiovisual projects in her country. Among her most outstanding works is the creation of the soundtrack for the Peruvian film El limpiador, directed by Adrian Saba, a work that earned her an Audience Award for Best Original Music at the International Film Festival of Punta del Este, as well as a nomination for Best Original Music in the first edition of the 2014 Platino Awards.

== Musical beginnings ==
She began to compose her first instrumental pieces from the age of 13. After taking studies in classical guitar, she began to write songs and to take singing lessons, which led her to compose different songs and to end up forming part of the first generation of singers of the vocal group Voces del Jazz directed by Mónica Gastelumendi and belonging to the Cultural Association Jazz Peru at that time directed by Gabriel Alegría. This stage was very important to start acquiring other tools that later would be used in her career as a composer.

Her professional musical career began in 2005, forming the vocal jazz trio Ezquilache with the singers Maria Laura Bustamante (Alejandro and María Laura) and Yoly García. With Ezquilache they would release a first album, A Tierra Negra (2007), where they would experiment with different genres such as jazz, funk, R&B, pop and their fusion with Afro-Peruvian sounds. A Tierra Negra was one of the most sold jazz albums in Peru in 2007 and the group had relative success in the local scene in Lima. But in 2008 each member would undertake their own projects and finally they would separate.

At the beginning of 2010 she began producing her first solo album. She makes a compilation of 10 of her subjects that talk about different situations in her life as a university student, about her hometown Lima and about the things that disturb her, that 's how Manzanas en el suelo was born, an indie folk – pop album, which stands out for its arrangements of winds, strings, guitars and keyboards. It was released on June 10, 2014, receiving very good reviews.

== Training ==
Zielinski studied a career in Communication Sciences at the University of Lima, a career that sparked her interest in film and audiovisual. Other studies include classical guitar, piano, singing, vocal jazz, harmony, composition and electronic music. She also has a Master in soundtracks and audiovisual media awarded by the Higher School of Music of Catalonia, ESMUC (Barcelona, Spain).

== Cinema, theater and television ==
She begins to work on the development of soundtracks for different short films and documentaries such as El niño y el mar, Bsb, Intensive Care, Faique, Dinosaurio, among others and this is how in 2010 she has the opportunity to create the soundtrack for the animated short film El mundo invisible, based on the illustrated album of the well-known Peruvian artist Fito Espinosa. With this work she launches an EP with the music of the film.

In 2011, she founded her own post-production studio Stereomonkey with her partner Raúl Astete. In it they begin to work in diverse audio-visual and musical projects. It is in that same year that she starts working on the soundtrack for the Peruvian film El limpiador, first feature film by director Adrian Saba. Her work got very good criticism and an award in 2013 for Best Original Music at the Punta del Este International Film Festival, standing out among more than 25 Ibero-American films.

In 2013 he starts working on the soundtrack for the film Sueños de Gloria, directed by Alex Hidalgo, first musical about the marinera made in Peru. She also began to work on music for the staging of Canciones para Mirar by Maria Elena Walsh and under the direction of master Alberto Ísola.

In 2014, her work at El Limpiador was selected among more than 700 Ibero-American films, obtaining a nomination for Best Original Music at the first edition of Premios Platino of the Ibero-American Film Awards 2014, where she was able to compete with 2 great international composers with a long career, the Argentine Emilio Kauderer and the Spanish Joan Valent.

This same year Zielinski works on the original music of the television documentary Camino a la Hoyada, a documentary by Andrés Cotler that talks about enforced disappearances in the Ayacucho region during the era of Terrorism in Peru in the 1980s.

She is summoned by Giovanni Ciccia to work in music for the play Un Fraude Epistolar, written by Fernando Ampuero del Bosque and directed by Ciccia. In this work she had the opportunity to delve into genres that have more to do with her Peruvian roots and reconnect with Authors of the Lima of 1900.

In 2015, the opportunity to work with Francisco Lombardi, an emblematic Peruvian director and with whom she had the opportunity to work on his latest film, Dos Besos (2015), is the story of a complex love triangle that triggers a series of events and changes in the three characters.

In 2016 La Última Tarde, Joel Calero's second feature, tells the story of a couple in the process of divorce that has not been seen in 19 years, following the steps during a single afternoon. This film has gone through different festivals obtaining important awards as Best Actress for Katherina D'Onofrio at the Punta del Este Film Festival and Best Director for Joel Calero at the Guadalajara Film Festival. Zielinski intervenes in the last scene of the film because at the time of post-production the team realized that there was a void that needed to be told in another way, according to her own words: It is a film that flows alone through its dialogues and that only needs that final push of the music in the last scene, when its characters just stop talking. Music then becomes the dialogue that unites both characters in the epilogue, becomes their voice imperceptibly and leads us to the end.

Between 2016 and 2017 she moved to Barcelona to study a Master in Soundtracks and music for Audiovisual Media at the Superior School of Music of Catalonia, where she had the opportunity to collaborate for the first time with the Bratislava Symphony Orchestra. When returning to Lima, Zielinski begins to work in the sound track of Django: sangre de mi sangre, a policeman directed by the emblematic director Aldo Salvini. For this film, Zielinski returns to the Bratislava Symphony Orchestra to record the original music.

== Discography ==
- A Tierra Negra (2007), with Ezquilache
- El Mundo Invisible (2011), Soundtrack
- Manzanas en el Suelo (2014), Soloist
- El Limpiador (Original Motion Picture Soundtrack) (2014), Soundtrack
- Dos Besos: Troika (Original Motion Picture Soundtrack) (2015), Soundtrack
- La Última Función (Original Motion Picture Soundtrack) (2015), Soundtrack
- AYA (Original Motion Picture Soundtrack) (2016), Soundtrack
- Margarita (Original Motion Picture Soundtrack) (2016), Soundtrack
- La Última Tarde (Original Motion Picture Soundtrack) (2016), Soundtrack
- Camino a la Hoyada (Original Motion Picture Soundtrack) (2017), Soundtrack
- Django, Sangre de Mi Sangre (Original Motion Picture Soundtrack) (2018), Soundtrack
- Amigos en Apuros (Original Motion Picture Soundtrack) (2018), Soundtrack
- Django, En El Nombre Del Hijo (Original Motion Picture Soundtrack) (2019), Soundtrack
- Identidad (Original Motion Picture Soundtrack) (2019), Soundtrack
- El Canto de las Mariposas (Original Motion Picture Soundtrack) (2020), Soundtrack
- Invasión Drag (Original Motion Picture Soundtrack) (2020), Soundtrack
- La Casa del Caracol (Original Motion Picture Soundtrack) (2021), Soundtrack
- El Refugio (Original Motion Picture Soundtrack) (2021), Soundtrack & Single
- Salir del Clóset (Original Motion Picture Soundtrack) (2022), Soundtrack
- Larga Distancia (Original Motion Picture Soundtrack) (2022), Soundtrack
- La Banda Presidencial (Original Motion Picture Soundtrack) (2022), Soundtrack
- Palabras Urgentes (Original Motion Picture Soundtrack) (2022), Soundtrack
- El Corazón de la Luna (Original Motion Picture Soundtrack) (2022), Soundtrack
- Willaq Pirqa (Original Motion Picture Soundtrack) (2022), Soundtrack
- Alegre y Olé (Original Motion Picture Soundtrack) (2023), Soundtrack
- De Caperucita a loba (Original Motion Picture Soundtrack) (2023), Soundtrack
- Soltera, Casada, Viuda, Divorciada (2023), Soundtrack & Singles
- El Sueño de Ariana (Original Motion Picture Soundtrack) (2024), Soundtrack
- Chabuca (Original Motion Picture Soundtrack) (2024), Soundtrack
- Arde Lima (2024), Soundtrack & Single
- Érase Una Vez En Los Andes (Original Motion Picture Soundtrack) (2024), Soundtrack
- Hampuy Amta Haru (Original Motion Picture Soundtrack) (2024), Soundtrack & Singles
- Sube a Mi Nube (Original Motion Picture Soundtrack) (2024), Soundtrack
- No Te Mueras Por Mí (Original Motion Picture Soundtrack) (2025), Soundtrack
- Apukunapa Kutimuynin (2025), Singles
- El Corazón del Lobo (Original Motion Picture Soundtrack) (2025), Soundtrack
- Pucallpa la Europea (Original Motion Picture Soundtrack) (2026), Soundtrack
- Q-Pop (Original Motion Picture Soundtrack) (2026), Soundtrack

== Awards and nominations ==
Awards	Category	Work	Result	Year
International Film Festival of Punta del Este	Audience Award for Best Original Music	El limpiador	Winner	2013
Platino Awards of Ibero-American Film	Best Original Music	El limpiador	Nominated	2014
Premios Luces El Comercio	Best New Artist 2014	Manzanas en el suelo	Nominated	2014
The Monthly Film Festival TMFF	Best Original Score of The Month	Humano	Winner	2018
