= Drag Invasion =

- Theatrical release poster
- Directed by: Alberto Castro
- Written by: Alberto Castro
- Produced by: Alberto Castro
- Cinematography: Renzo Rivas
- Edited by: Esteban Monzón
- Music by: Karin Zielinski
- Production company: Arde Lima
- Release dates: November 19, 2020 (Lima); June 23, 2022 (Peru)
- Running time: 78 minutes
- Country: Peru
- Languages: Spanish; English

Drag Invasion (Spanish: Invasión Drag) is a 2020 Peruvian documentary film written, produced and directed by Alberto Castro in his directorial debut. It follows the phenomenon of the arrival in Lima of the drag queens from the reality show RuPaul's Drag Race in 2017. It is the first film of Castro's documentary trilogy about LGBTIQ+ in Peru following Salir del clóset (2022) and Lima Is Burning (2023).

== Synopsis ==
In 2017, dozens of drag queens from the international competition reality show RuPaul's Drag Race arrived in Lima, Peru and sold out each of their performances. Weaving their stories with those of local drag artists, the film documents artistic and political mobilization in the LGBTQ community in a country generally regarded as hostile to LGBTQ people.

== Cast ==
- Tany de la Riva
- Georgia Hart
- Sandra Picciotti
- Renzo Sáenz
- Oliver Ramos
- Carola Gutiérrez

== Release ==
Drag Invasion had its world premiere on November 19, 2020, at the 6th University of Lima Film Week, then screened on December 4, 2020, at Cinestesia, on May 27, 2021, at the 31st Inside Out Film Festival, on October 16, 2021, at the New York LGBTQ+ Film Festival, and at the beginning of March 2023 at the 26th Málaga Film Festival in the Latam Focus section, which paid tribute to Peru as a special guest country. It was commercially released on June 23, 2022, in Peruvian theaters.
