= Henry Vallejo =

Peruvian filmmaker

- Born: Henry Vallejo Torres; 1970 (age 55–56); Azángaro, Peru
- Occupations: Film director, screenwriter, film producer
- Notable work: Powerful Chief

Henry Vallejo Torres (born 1970, Azángaro, Peru) is a Peruvian film director, film producer and screenwriter. He is best known for directing, co-writing and producing Powerful Chief (2020), which was selected as Peru's entry for Best International Feature Film at the 94th Academy Awards.

== Career ==
He holds a degree in Communication Sciences from the Universidad Nacional del Altiplano de Puno. He directed short documentaries for the Ministry of Tourism, Industry and Commerce and PromPerú.

In 2002, he filmed his first feature film in Puno, the horror film El misterio del kharisiri, which was commercially released in 2004.

In 2010, he began writing the screenplay for the drama film Powerful Chief, which began filming in 2013. However, production was interrupted when the lead actor dropped out to study medicine in Lima. Over the next three years, auditions were held in Lima, Arequipa, Cusco, and Juliaca, with filming resuming in January 2016. The film premiered at the 24th Lima Film Festival as part of the Fiction competition, winning Best Actor for Jesús Luque.

In 2023, he produced the drama film Reinaldo Cutipa, which premiered in the Made in Peru section at the 27th Lima Film Festival.

== Selected filmography ==
Year	Title	Director	Writer	Producer	Notes
2004	El misterio del kharisiri	Yes	Yes	No	Feature film
2005	Romato	Yes	Yes	No	Short film
2020	Powerful Chief	Yes	Yes	Yes	Feature film
2023	Reinaldo Cutipa	No	No	Yes	Feature film
