= LXI (61) =

- Theatrical release poster
- Directed by: Rodrigo Moreno del Valle
- Written by: Rodrigo Moreno del Valle llary Alencastre Pinilla
- Produced by: Loshua Flores Guerra llary Alencastre Pinilla; Juan Manuel Olivera
- Starring: Javier Saavedra; Cynthia Moreno; Rodrigo Palacios; Sebastián Rubio
- Cinematography: Juan Pablo Polanco
- Edited by: José Luis Alcada; Bernie De la Cruz
- Music by: Nico Saba
- Production company: Arrebato Cine
- Release dates: August 2021 (Lima); April 21, 2022 (Peru)
- Running time: 73 minutes
- Country: Peru
- Language: Spanish

LXI (61) is a 2021 Peruvian drama film directed by Rodrigo Moreno del Valle and written by del Valle and llary Alencastre Pinilla. It stars Javier Saavedra, Cynthia Moreno, Rodrigo Palacios and Sebastián Rubio. It is about 4 friends who meet again to talk about what happened to another of their friends.

== Synopsis ==
Humberto, Cristian, Daniel and Gabriela meet again after 15 years after the suicide of their friend Bernal, "El Muerto." Over the course of one night, the four of them must face the circumstances that separated them so long ago and understand the reason for their friend's decision.

== Cast ==
The actors participating in this film are:

- Javier Saavedra as Humberto
- Cynthia Moreno as Gabriela
- Rodrigo Palacios as Daniel
- Sebastián Rubio as Cristian

== Release ==
LXI (61) had its world premiere at the end of August 2021 as part of the fiction competition selection at the 25th Lima Film Festival. It was commercially released on April 21, 2022, in Peruvian theaters.

== Accolades ==
Year	Award / Festival	Category	Recipient	Result	Ref.
2021	25th Lima Film Festival	Best Picture	LXI (61)	Nominated	
2021	Trujillo Film Festival	Special Jury Prize - Fiction Feature Film	LXI (61)	Won	
2022	13th APRECI Awards	Best Peruvian Feature Film	LXI (61)	Nominated	
2022	13th APRECI Awards	Best Supporting Actor	Rodrigo Palacios	Won	
2022	13th APRECI Awards	Best Supporting Actor	Sebastián Rubio	Nominated	
2022	13th APRECI Awards	Best Supporting Actress	Cynthia Moreno	Won	
2022	13th APRECI Awards	Best Screenplay	Rodrigo Moreno del Valle & Illary Alencastre Pinilla	Won	
