= Hatun Phaqcha, The Healing Land =

- Theatrical release poster
- Directed by: Delia Ackerman
- Written by: Delia Ackerman; Augusto Cabada
- Produced by: Susana Bamonde; Margarita Morales Macedo
- Cinematography: Juan Durán
- Edited by: Javier Arciniega; José Luis Jiménez; Bernardo Cáceres
- Music by: Pauchi Sasaki
- Production company: Fil Films
- Distributed by: Cecilia Gómez de la Torre; Tondero Distribución; Amazonas Films
- Release dates: August 2021 (Lima); 17 February 2022 (Peru)
- Running time: 92 minutes
- Country: Peru
- Language: Spanish

Hatun Phaqcha, The Healing Land (Spanish: Hatun Phaqcha, tierra sana) is a 2021 Peruvian documentary film co-written and directed by Delia Ackerman. It won the Biznaga de Plata in the "Cinema Cocina" category at the 26th Málaga Film Festival.

== Synopsis ==
This documentary has compiled the testimony of farmers, scientists, cooks, anthropologists, among others, highlighting the quality of domesticated products since pre-Columbian times, with Peru being the scene of highly nutritious foods. The history of various native products has been portrayed, such as tarwi, tocosh, nutmeg, various varieties of potatoes, among others. The director invites us to reflect and is also a wake-up call for viewers to learn about caring for the environment and the land that we live in. It has provided rich biodiversity preserved for generations, in addition to making responsible use of our resources.

== Production ==
The production took nine years to complete. It was recorded in different locations in the regions of Peru such as Cusco, Huánuco, Lima, Madre de Dios, Iquitos, Moquegua, Áncash, Puno and Piura.

== Release ==
The film had its world premiere in August 2021 in the Made in Peru section at the 25th Lima Film Festival. It was commercially released on February 17, 2022, in Peruvian theaters.

== Reception ==
=== Box office ===
The film lasted a week in theaters, selling 366 movie tickets.

=== Accolades ===
Year	Award / Festival	Category	Recipient	Result	Ref.
2021	25th Lima Film Festival	Audience Award	Hatun Phaqcha, The Healing Land	Won	
2021	25th Lima Film Festival	PUCP Community Award for Made in Peru Best Film	Hatun Phaqcha, The Healing Land	Won	
2021	Toronto Women Film Festival	Environment Award	Hatun Phaqcha, The Healing Land	Won	
2022	13th APRECI Awards	Best Documentary	Hatun Phaqcha, The Healing Land	Nominated	
2022	International Environmental Film Festival	Latin American Documentaries	Hatun Phaqcha, The Healing Land	Won	
2023	26th Málaga Film Festival	Cinema Cocina	Hatun Phaqcha, The Healing Land	Won	
2024	11th Huánuco Film Festival	Best Feature Documentary in Fiction Premiere	Hatun Phaqcha, The Healing Land	Won	
