= Reinaldo Cutipa =

- Theatrical release poster
- Directed by: Oscar Gonzales Apaza
- Written by: Oscar Gonzales Apaza; Jaime Luna Victoria
- Produced by: Henry Vallejo
- Starring: Jesús Luque Colque; Sylvia Majo; Danitza Pilco
- Cinematography: Micaela Cajahuaringa
- Edited by: Oscar Gonzales Apaza; Guido Ruben Zea
- Music by: Girodel Zea
- Production company: Contacto Producciones
- Release dates: August 11, 2023 (Lima); February 22, 2024 (Peru)
- Running time: 118 minutes
- Country: Peru
- Language: Spanish

Reinaldo Cutipa is a 2023 Peruvian drama film directed by Oscar Gonzales Apaza and written by Gonzales and Jaime Luna Victoria. It stars Jesús Luque Colque, Sylvia Majo and Danitza Pilco. It is about Reinaldo whose relationship with his overprotective mother will change when he meets his teenage girlfriend Rosaura who wants to travel to Lima.

Oscar Gonzáles Apaza, film director of "Reinaldo Cutipa" about his movie.

== Synopsis ==
Reinaldo Cutipa is a 30-year-old man who lives and works in a grocery store with his mother Matilde, an overprotective and dominant woman, with whom he has a sordid bond. Although Reinaldo wants to travel with his teenage girlfriend Rosaura to Lima, Matilde is opposed. At that moment she convinces him to bring her and then work with him in the store.

== Cast ==
- Jesús Luque Colque as Reinaldo Cutipa
- Sylvia Majo as Matilde
- Danitza Pilco as Rosaura
- Amiel Cayo
- Gaby Huayhua

== Production ==
Principal photography lasted 5 weeks between June and July 2022 in Santa Lucía, Puno.

== Release ==
Reinaldo Cutipa had its world premiere on August 11, 2023, in the Made in Peru section at the 27th Lima Film Festival. It was commercially released on February 22, 2024, in Peruvian theaters.

== Reception ==
=== Box office ===
In its first weekend on the billboard it ranked 20th, selling 3,000 tickets.

=== Accolades ===
Year	Award / Festival	Category	Recipient	Result	Ref.
2023	27th Lima Film Festival	Made in Peru - Audience Award	Reinaldo Cutipa	Nominated	
2024	15th APRECI Awards	Best Actor	Jesús Luque Colque	Nominated	
2024	15th APRECI Awards	Best Actress	Sylvia Majo	Won	

== Gallery ==
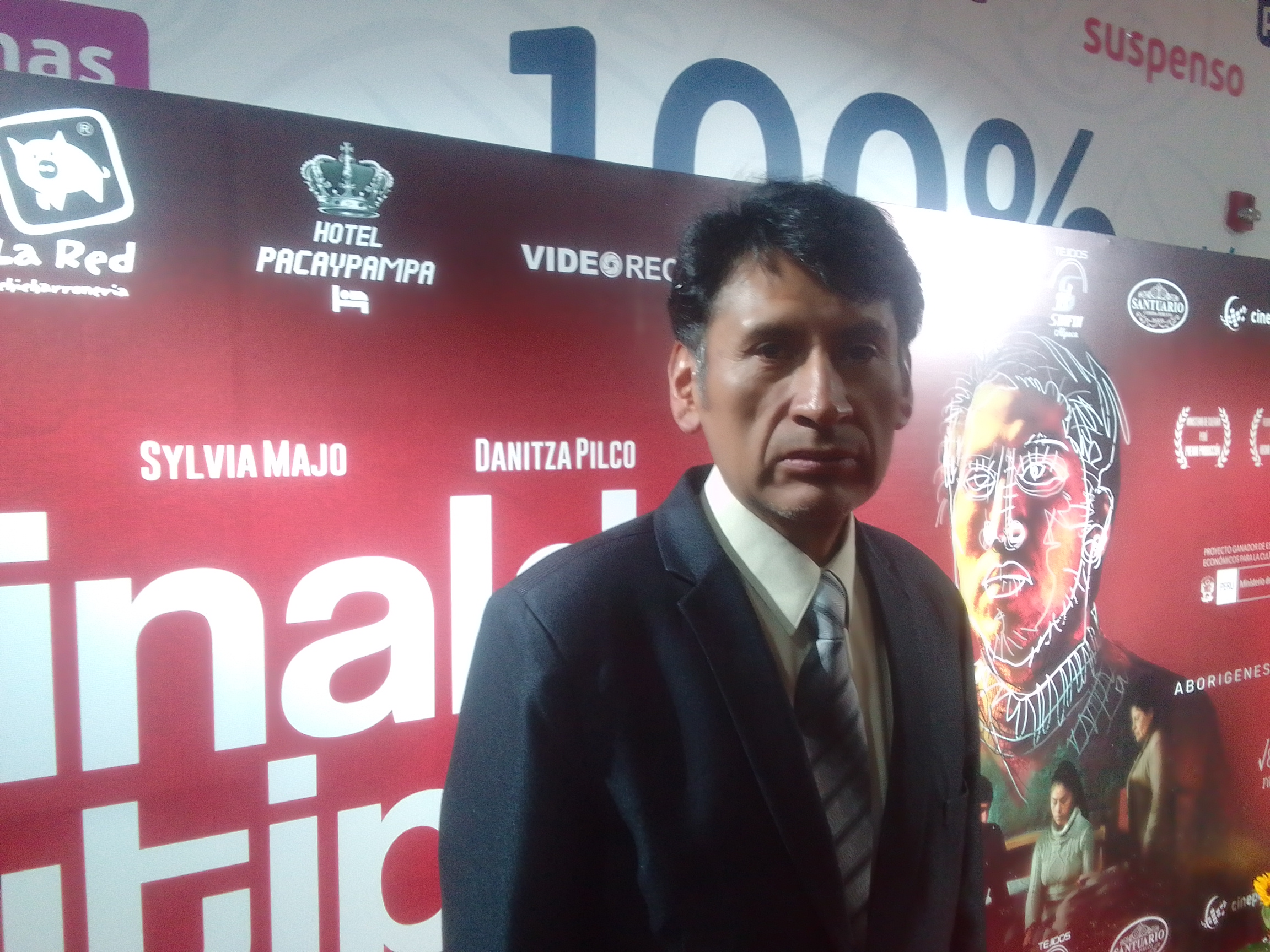
Oscar Gonzáles Apaza, actor and filmmaker from Juliaca, at the Avant Premiere of his film "Reinaldo Cutipa".

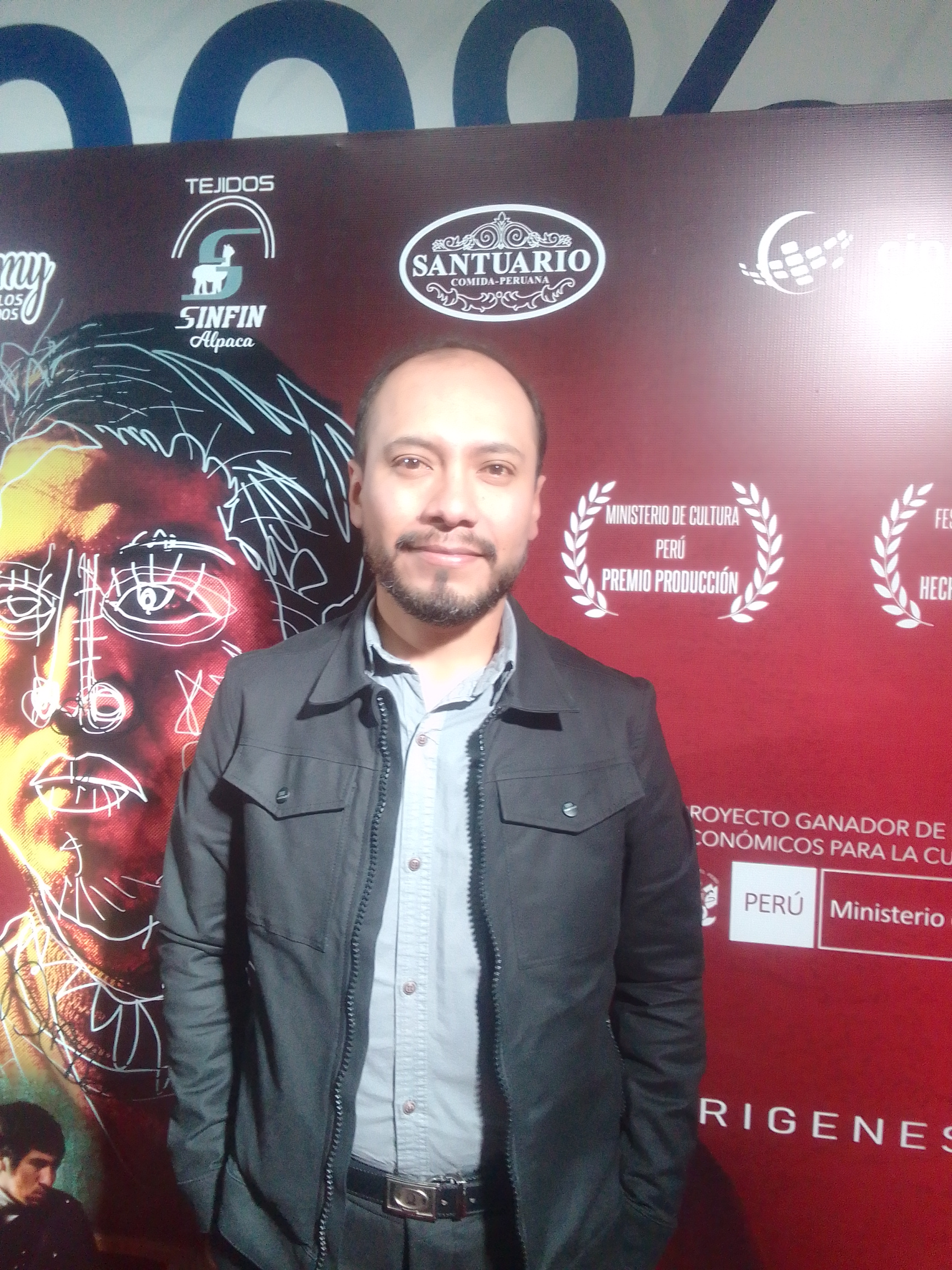
Henry Vallejo Torres, Azangarino filmmaker, general producer of the film "Reinaldo Cutipa."

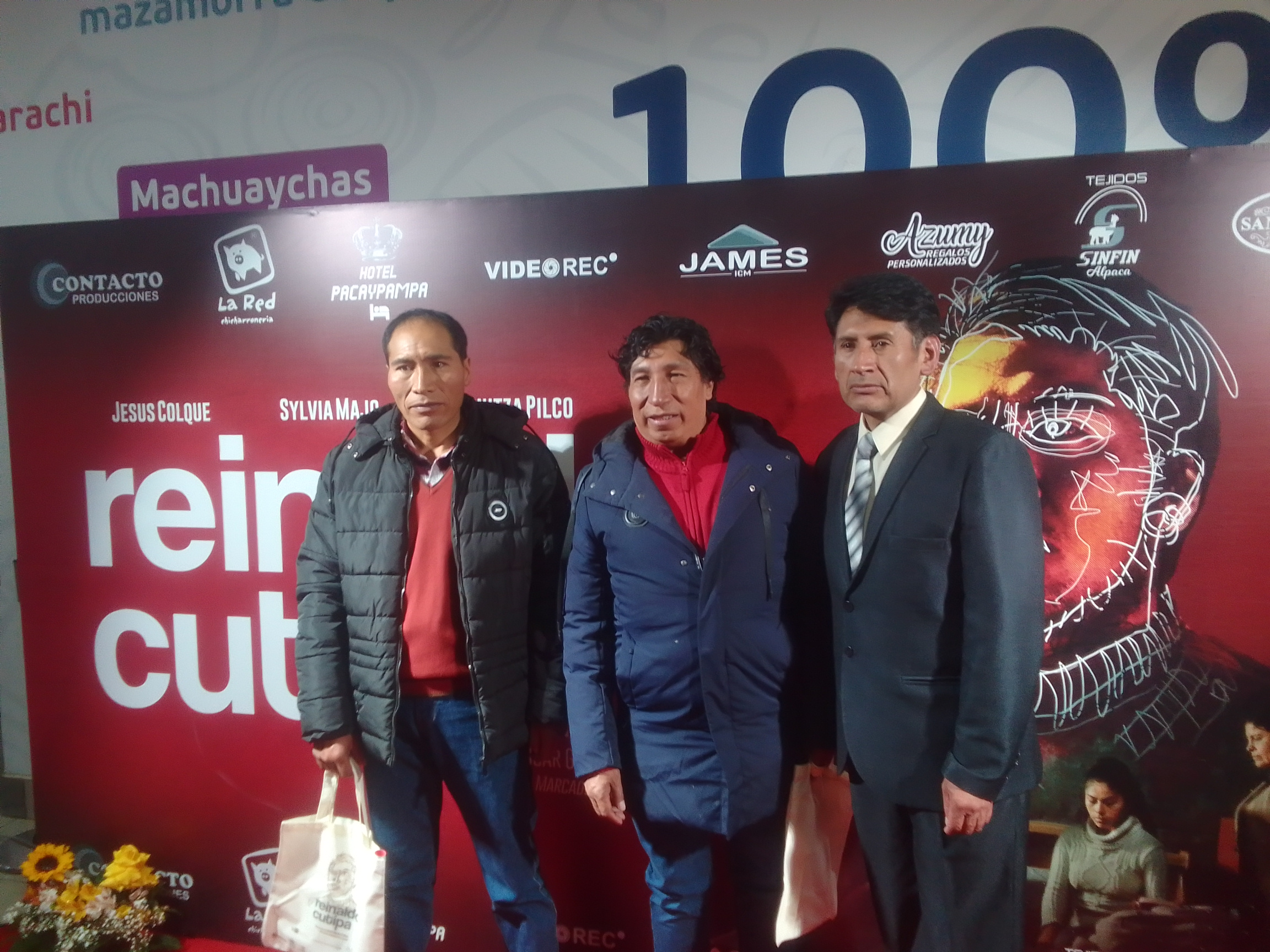
De izquierda a derecha: Tito Catacora, uncle of Oscar Catacora, director of "Wiñaypacha"; Flaviano Quispe, director of "Juanito El Huerfanito" and Oscar Gonzáles Apaza, director of "Reinaldo Cutipa." All of them filmmakers from Puno.

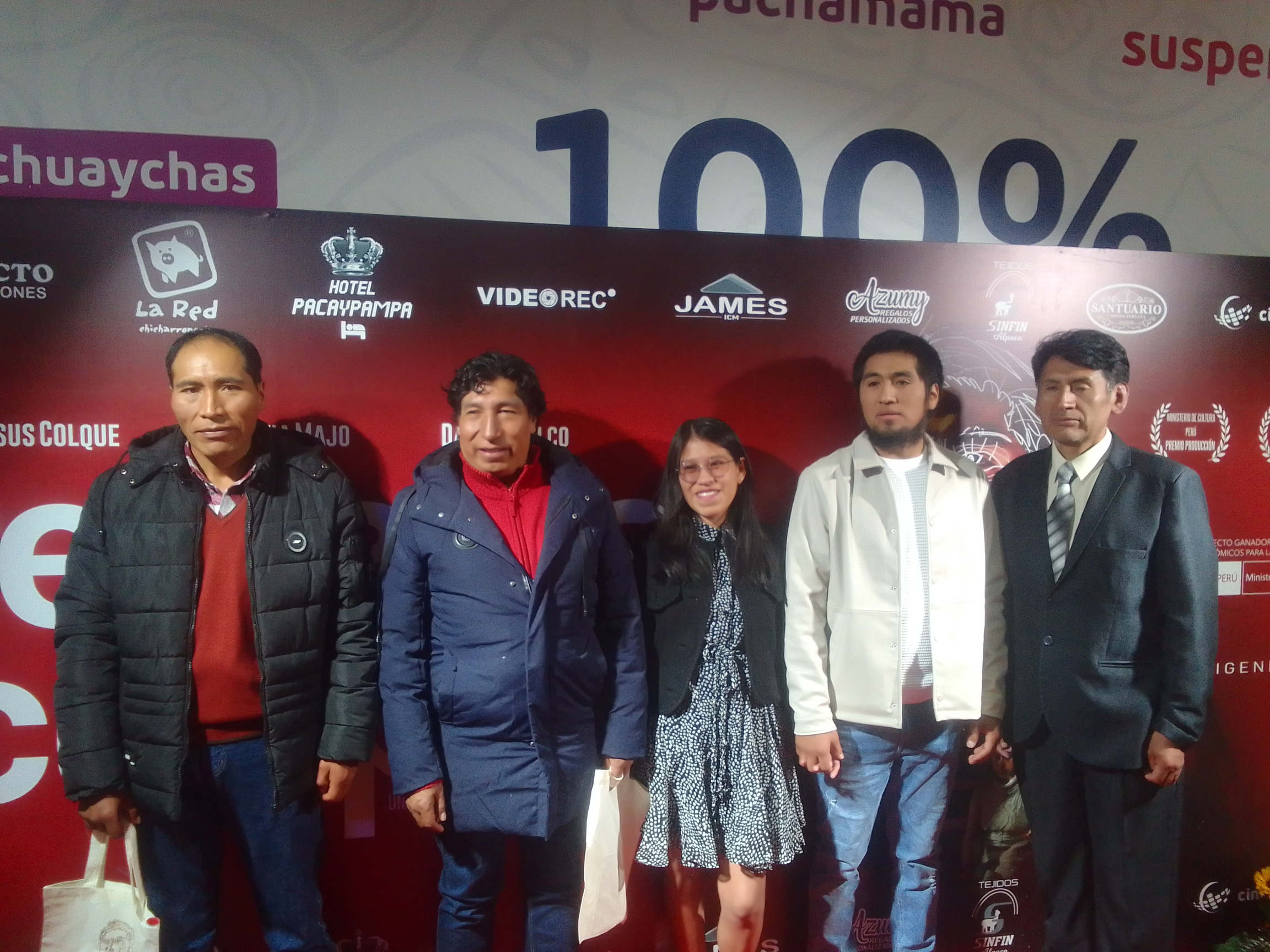
Tito Catacora; Flaviano Quispe, Jesús Luque Colque and Oscar Gonzáles Apaza at the Avant Premiere of "Reinaldo Cutipa" in the city of Juliaca, Puno.
