= Powerful Chief =

2020 film

- Film poster
- Spanish: Manco Cápac
- Directed by: Henry Vallejo
- Release dates: August 21, 2020 (Lima Film Festival); December 9, 2021 (Peru)
- Running time: 92 minutes
- Country: Peru
- Languages: Spanish; Quechua
- Budget: $160.000

Powerful Chief (Spanish: Manco Cápac) is a 2020 Peruvian drama film co-written, co-produced and directed by Henry Vallejo. It was selected as the Peruvian entry for the Best International Feature Film at the 94th Academy Awards.

== Plot ==
After arriving in Puno, Elisban struggles to find work and a sense of belonging.

== See also ==
- List of submissions to the 94th Academy Awards for Best International Feature Film
- List of Peruvian submissions for the Academy Award for Best International Feature Film
