= Noise (2020 film) =

- Theatrical release poster
- Directed by: Marco Vélez Esquivia
- Written by: Estefanía Piñeres Duque
- Produced by: Marco Vélez Esquivia; Oscar Alejandro Zapata
- Starring: Ana María Aguilera; Cony Camelo; Jimena Durán; Walther Luengas; Estefanía Piñeres Duque; Biassini Segura; Jacques Toukhmanian; Carlos Manuel Vesga
- Cinematography: Nora Lengua Puche
- Edited by: LinaOrtiz
- Music by: Antonio Espinosa; Luis Mesa
- Production company: 2/4 Producciones S.A.S.
- Release dates: July 18, 2020 (IndieBo); May 11, 2021 (Colombia)
- Running time: 81 minutes
- Country: Colombia
- Language: Spanish

Noise (Spanish: Ruido) is a 2020 Colombian crime thriller film directed by Marco Vélez Esquivia and written by Estefanía Piñeres Duque. It stars Ana María Aguilera, Cony Camelo, Jimena Durán, Walther Luengas, Estefanía Piñeres Duque, Biassini Segura, Jacques Toukhmanian and Carlos Manuel Vesga.

== Synopsis ==
A businessman is assassinated during a dinner. There are 5 suspects and 5 different versions. Through interrogations and clues, a detective tries to uncover the crime where the pieces of the puzzle don't seem to fit.

== Cast ==
The actors participating in this film are:

- Ana María Aguilera as Laura
- Cony Camelo as María Luisa
- Jimena Durán as Julia
- Walther Luengas as Simón
- Estefanía Piñeres Duque as Elisa
- Biassini Segura as Héctor
- Jacques Toukhmanian as Guillermo
- Carlos Manuel Vesga as Augusto
- Víctor Tarazona as Robledo
- Alejandra Villafañe as Raquel
- Connie Sperakis as Presenter
- Jenny Gómez as Forensic
- Mónica Del Carmen as Woman

== Release ==
Noise had its world premiere on July 18, 2020, at the Bogotá International Independent Film Festival, then it was commercially released on May 11, 2021, in Colombian theaters.

== Accolades ==
Year	Award	Category	Recipient	Result	Ref.
2021	Macondo Awards	Best Supporting Actor	Biassini Segura	Nominated	
