= Salir del clóset =

- Film poster
- Directed by: Alberto Castro
- Written by: Alberto Castro
- Cinematography: Manuel Ramirez; Midchel Meza
- Edited by: Andrés Becerra; Romina Flores
- Music by: Karin Zielinski
- Production company: Arde Lima
- Release date: 2022
- Running time: 92 minutes
- Country: Peru
- Language: Spanish

Salir del clóset (lit. 'Come out of the closet') is a 2022 Peruvian documentary film written and directed by Alberto Castro. It presents stories and testimonials from ten gay men and the difficulties they faced in freely assuming their sexual orientation. It is the second film of Castro's documentary trilogy about LGBTIQ+ in Peru following Drag Invasion (2020), and preceding Lima Is Burning (2023).

== Synopsis ==
10 Peruvian homosexual men will narrate their experiences after discovering their gender identity. The film demonstrates the hard difficulties they are going through due to institutionalized homophobia in Peru. It also raises various issues that reflect on tolerance and respect for diversity.

== Cast ==
- Bruno García-Calderón
- Josué Parodi
- Paco Flores
- Marcelo Cicala
- Gino Lorenzo
- Joaco Ahumada
- Eduardo Villanueva
- Lucho Mora
- Iván Pérez
- Omar Olivos

== Release ==
It was initially released as part of the National Selection of the Cinema Week of the University of Lima 2022. After having won the National Contest for the Distribution and Circulation of Works 2022 of the Ministry of Culture, the film was scheduled to be released on January 28, 2023, in Peruvian theaters, but the premiere was brought forward to January 17, 2023, for theaters Peruvians from the Cineplanet chain.
