= Angosta =

2003 novel written by Héctor Abad Faciolince

Angosta is a novel written by the Colombian author Héctor Abad Faciolince, published in 2003 by Seix Barral (Spain). Angosta has been translated into Chinese as 深谷幽城 in 2005. The four Chinese characters mean, respectively: deep, valley, faint or dim, and castle, so an attempt to a translation would be "The deep valley and the dim castle". This translation received the prize for the best translated novel of the year in China. The novel was also translated into French by J.C. Lattès Publishing House in 2010.

Angosta is an imaginary city in the middle of the Andes and some of its precedents are Clarín's fictional city of Vetusta, Onetti's Santa María and Gabriel García Márquez imaginary town, Macondo. Many critics have defined Angosta, the novel, as a modern Dystopia that in some ways describes the segregation and inequality of contemporary world.
