= Christian Tappan =

Mexican-Colombian television and cinema actor (born 1972)

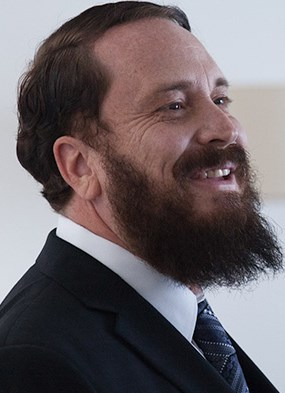
- Tappan in his role as Gorka in Mexican television series La Hermandad.
- Born: 19 February 1972 (age 54); Mexico City, Mexico
- Occupation: Actor
- Years active: 1985–present

Christian Tappan (born 19 February 1972) is a Mexican-Colombian television actor. He is mainly recognized for his work in Mexican and Colombian soap operas and series.

== Biography ==
At the age of 5 he had already participated in several television commercials. His parents settled in Colombia when he was only 6 years old and later, he had a part on the Décimo Grado series (1985).

== Filmography ==
=== Film ===
Year	Title	Role	Notes
2015	La semilla del silencio	Fabrizio Méndez	
2015	Qué viva la música	Don Rufián	
2018	La Boda de Valentina	Demetrio	
2020	Dogwashers	Don Oscar	
2021	Primate		

=== Television roles ===
Year	Title	Role	Notes
1997	El secreto de Alejandra	David	
2000	Ramona	Colorado	
2001	Amigas y rivales	Alejandro Pohlenz Writer of the soap opera "La Frontera del Amor" which Nayely Perez (Angelica Vale) stars	
2001–2002	Mujer, casos de la vida real	Unknown role	2 episodes
2003	No renuncies Salomé	Juan Pablo	
2003	Amor descarado	Basilio Concha	
2004	Anita no te rajes	Father Francisco	
2006	Amores de mercado	Gerardo Suárez	
2007	Sobregiro de amor	Horacio Peres	
2007	El Zorro, la espada y la rosa	Javier	
2008	El cartel de los sapos	Caremico	
2008	Sin senos no hay paraíso	Octavio	
2008	Vecinos	Alfonso "Poncho" María Craus	
2009	Las trampas del amor	Dr. Montes	
2010	El Clon	Raúl Escobar	
2011	La Reina del Sur	Willy Rangel	Recurring role (season 1); 33 episodes
2011	La Bruja	Locutor	23 episodes
2012	Pablo Escobar, The Drug Lord	Gonzalo Gaviria	82 episodes
2013	La promesa	Roberto Aristizábal	Episode: "Tres bellas jovencitas, en tres diferentes lugares"
2014	La suegra	Bernardo Burgos	
2014	Fugitivos	Steve Houston	
2015	La esquina del diablo	Ángel Velasco	
2015–2016	El Señor de los Cielos	Gustavo Gaviria / El Oficial	Recurring role
2016–present	La Hermandad	Gorka Marín	Recurring role
2015–2016	Narcos	Kiko Moncada	Recurring role (season 1), Archive footage (season 2); 5 episodes
2016	Drunk History: El lado borroso de la historia	Flaco	Episode: "El eclipse de Colón, Agustín Lara y María Félix, La espada de Bolívar"
2017	La fiscal de hierro	Francisco Miranda	Main role; 39 episodes
2017	Cuando vivas conmigo	Felicito Yanequé	
2018	Distrito Salvaje	Apache	
2019	Snowfall	Rigo Vasco	Recurring role (season 3); 5 episodes
2020	El robo del siglo	El Abogado	
2022	It Was Always Me	El Faraón	
2024	Griselda	Arturo Mesa	

== Awards ==
Year	Award	Category	Nominated work	Result	Ref.
2025	Premios Aura	Best Actor in Supporting Role	El secuestro del vuelo 601	Won	
