= Autoerotic (2021 film) =

- Theatrical release poster
- Spanish: Autoerótica
- Directed by: Andrea Hoyos
- Written by: Andrea Hoyos
- Produced by: Andrea Hoyos; Carol Delgado Orbezo; Héctor Gálvez
- Starring: Rafaella Mey; Micaela Céspedes
- Cinematography: Micaela Cajahuaringa
- Edited by: Irene Cajías
- Production company: Piedra Alada Producciones
- Distributed by: Tondero Distribución
- Release dates: August 19, 2021 (Lima); March 3, 2022 (Peru)
- Running time: 92 minutes
- Country: Peru
- Language: Spanish

Autoerotic (Spanish: Autoerótica) is a 2021 Peruvian coming-of-age drama film written, co-produced and directed by Andrea Hoyos in her directorial debut. It stars Rafaella Mey and Micaela Céspedes accompanied by María del Carmen Gutiérrez, Wendy Vásquez, Renato Rueda, César Ritter, Beto Benites and Laynol Zavaleta. It is about a 15-year-old teenager who explores her sexuality through an online dating program.

== Synopsis ==
Bruna is a teenager who is exploring her sexuality. Through an online dating program, she begins a relationship that will surpass her teenage spirit and make her confront the freedom of her body; helping her reconnect with her true identity.

== Cast ==
The actors participating in this film are:

- Rafaella Mey as Bruna
- Micaela Céspedes as Débora
- Wendy Vasquez as Irene
- María del Carmen Gutiérrez as Paulina
- Renato Rueda as Lucas
- Beto Benites
- Renato Rueda
- César Ritter

== Production ==
Principal photography took place in April 2019 at Residencial San Felipe in Jesús María District, Lima, Peru.

== Release ==
Autoerotic had its world premiere on August 19, 2021, as part of the fiction competition selection at the 25th Lima Film Festival. It was commercially released on March 3, 2022, in Peruvian theaters.

== Accolades ==
Year	Award / Festival	Category	Recipient	Result	Ref.
2021	25th Lima Film Festival	Best Picture	Autoerotic	Nominated	
2021	25th Lima Film Festival	Fiction Competition - First Special Mention	Autoerotic	Won	
2022	13th APRECI Awards	Best Peruvian Feature Film	Autoerotic	Nominated	
2022	13th APRECI Awards	Best Screenplay	Andrea Hoyos	Nominated	
2022	13th APRECI Awards	Best Actress	Rafaella Mey	Won	
2022	13th APRECI Awards	Best Supporting Actress	Wendy Vásquez	Nominated	
