= Pilar Quintana =

Colombian writer (born 1972)

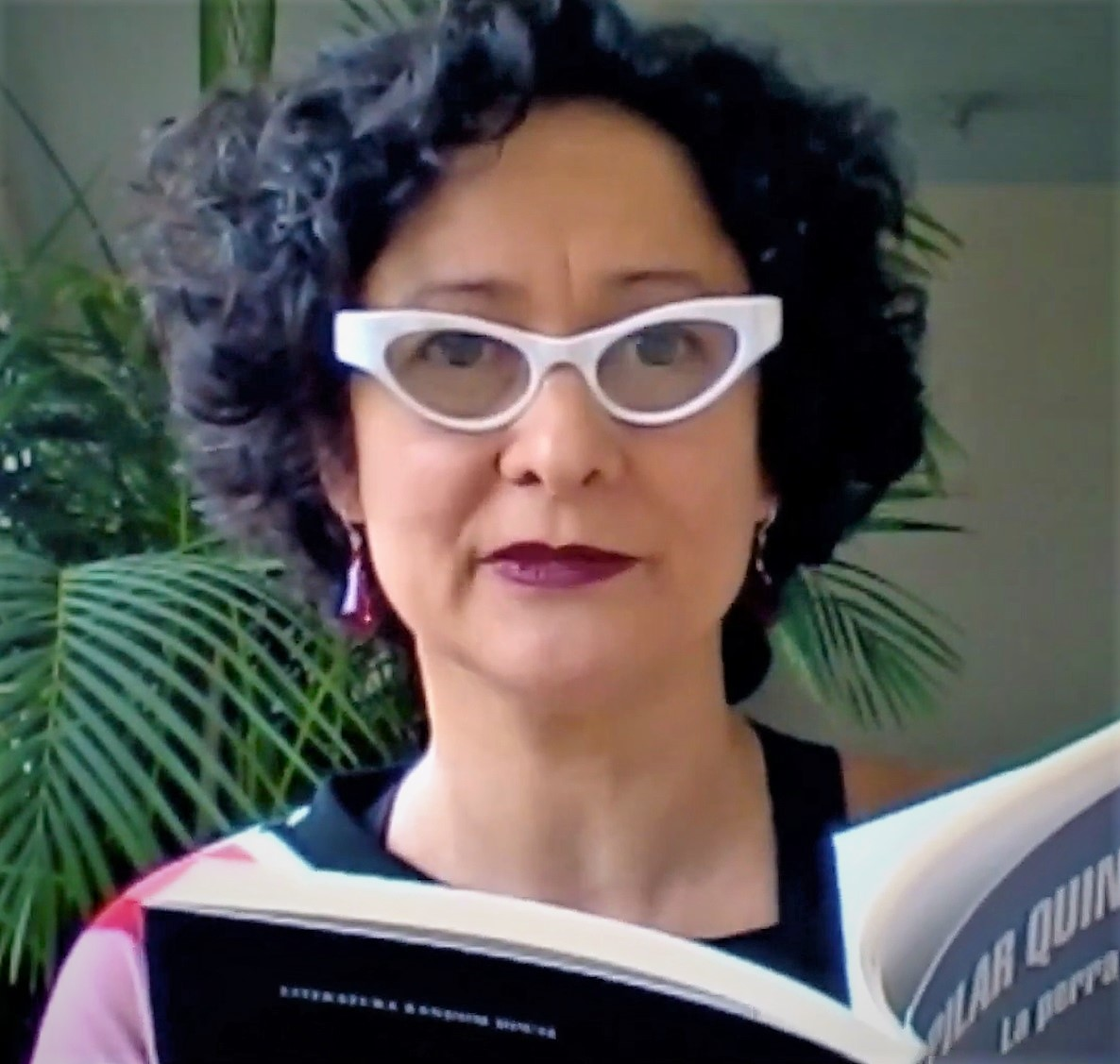
- Quintana in 2020
- Born: 1972 (age 52–53); Cali, Colombia
- Language: Spanish
- Education: Javeriana University
- Notable awards: Alfaguara Prize; 2021 Los abismos

Pilar Quintana (born 1st January 1972) is a Colombian writer. She was born in Cali and studied at the Javeriana University in Bogota. In 2011, she attended the International Writing Program of the University of Iowa as a writer-in-residence, and in 2012, the International Writers Workshop of the Baptist University of Hong Kong as a visiting writer. She has published five novels and a short story collection, Caperucita se come al lobo. She is best known for her novels La Perra and Coleccionistas de polvos raros.

Quintana has received multiple awards for her writings. In 2007, she was chosen by Hay Festival as one of the Bogota39, a selection of the most promising young writers in Latin America. In 2010, she won the Premio de Novela La Mar de Letras in Spain for Coleccionistas de polvos raros. Her novel La Perra (translated from Spanish to English by Lisa Dillman and published by World Editions under the title The Bitch) was translated into 16 languages. It was shortlisted for the Colombian Premio Nacional de Novela in 2018 and the National Book Award for Translated Literature in the US in October 2020, and it was announced the winner of the English Pen Award and the Premio de Biblioteca de Narrativa Colombiana in 2018.

Her screenplay Lavaperros, written with Antonio García Ángel, has won two grants from Fondo para el Desarrollo Cinematográfico, Proimágenes, and the Premio Manuel Barba of Huelva's Press Association for best script in 2020.

In 2021, her novel Los abismos won the Premio Alfaguara de Novela and was translated into several languages. In September 2023, the English translation, Abyss, translated by Lisa Dillman, was longlisted for the National Book Award for Translated Literature.

== Bibliography ==
=== Novels (in Spanish) ===
- — (2003). Cosquillas en la lengua (paperback ed.). Planeta Colombiana. ISBN 978-9584206152.
- — (2007). Coleccionistas de polvos raros (in Spanish) (1st paperback ed.). Norma. ISBN 978-9580498698.
- — (2009). Conspiración Iguana (in Spanish) (1st paperback ed.). Norma. ISBN 978-9584520371.
- — (2017). La perra (in Spanish) (1st paperback ed.). Literatura Random House. ISBN 978-9588979731.
- — (2021). Los abismos (in Spanish) (1st paperback ed.). Alfaguara. ISBN 978-6125020048.

=== Collections and Short Works (in Spanish) ===
- — (2014). Violación (in Spanish) (ebook ed.). Aroba Books. ISBN 978-8416103171.
- — (2020). Caperucita se come al Lobo (in Spanish) (1st paperback ed.). Literatura Random House. ISBN 978-9585581326.

=== Novels (in English) ===
- — (2020). The Bitch. Translated by Dillman, Lisa (paperback ed.). World Editions. ISBN 978-1642860597.
- — (2023). Abyss. Translated by Dillman, Lisa (paperback ed.). World Editions. ISBN 978-1642861228.
