= The Fever (2019 film) =

- Theatrical release poster
- Portuguese: A Febre
- Directed by: Maya Da-Rin
- Written by: Maya Da-Rin
- Starring: Regis Myrupu; Rosa Peixoto
- Production companies: Tamanduá Vermelho; Enquadramento Produções; Still Moving; Komplizen Film
- Distributed by: Vitrine Filmes (Brazil); Survivance (France)
- Release date: August 2019 (Locarno)
- Running time: 98 min
- Countries: Brazil; France; Germany
- Languages: Portuguese; Tucano; Ticuna

The Fever (Portuguese: A Febre) is a 2019 thriller drama film co-written and directed by Maya Da-Rin, starring Regis Myrupu and Rosa Peixoto. Featuring dialogue in Portuguese and the indigenous languages Tucano and Ticuna, it features a main cast of indigenous Brazilian from the Upper Rio Negro, belonging to the Desanos, Tucanos and Tarianas people, many of them whom had their first experience in cinema.

The film premiered at the international competition of the 72nd Locarno International Film Festival in Switzerland, where it received the Golden Leopard for Best Actor for Regis Myrupu, FIPRESCI International Film Critics Award and the "Environment is Quality of Life" Prize from the young jury. Besides the award at the Locarno Festival, Regis Myrupu also received the Best Actor Award at the Brasilia Film Festival, becoming the first indigenous actor to be awarded at both festivals.

== Plot ==
The Fever tells the story of Justino (Regis Myrupu), a 45-year-old member of the indigenous Desana people, who emigrate to the city of Manaus leaving behind his village on the Upper Rio Negro region. Widowed, Justino works as a security guard at a cargo port, while his daughter Vanessa (Rosa Peixoto) takes several jobs as a nursing technician, and his eldest son lives in his own home with his wife and son. Caught up in the stream of a modest life, their routine comes down to the transit between their work and home, on the outskirts of Manaus.

When Vanessa hears that she has been approved to study medicine at the University of Brasília, her father's lack of ability to deal with the demands of urban life makes her question her decision to leave. At the same time, the visions that have been disturbing Justino in his dreams, start to manifest themselves in the form of a mysterious and intermittent fever, which coincides with rumors about the presence of a mysterious creature in the neighborhood.

In the port, his monotonous work routine is broken with the arrival of a new guard (Lourinelson Wladmir), with whom Justino has to deal with during the shift changes. Working before as a foreman of a cattle ranch in the countryside, Wanderlei does not hide his deep prejudice against native people. Meanwhile, the visit of his brother (Edmildo Vaz) and his sister-in-law (Anunciata Teles) makes Justino remember his village in the forest, from where he left twenty years ago.

== Cast ==
- Regis Myrupu as Justino
- Rosa Peixoto as Vanessa
- Johnatan Sodré as Everton
- Edmildo Vaz Pimentel as André
- Anunciata Teles Soares as Marta
- Kaisaro Jussara Brito as Jalmira
- Lourinelson Wladmir as Wanderlei
- Suzy Lopes as Rose

== Production ==
The Fever is an international co-production between Brazil (Tamanduá Vermelho and Enquadramento Produções), France (Still Moving) and Germany (Komplizen Film), produced by Maya Da-Rin, Leonardo Mecchi and Juliette Lepoudre and co-produced by Pierre Menahem, Janine Jackowski and Jonas Dornbach. The project was developed with the support of the Cinéfondation screenplay residency from the Cannes Film Festival and the TorinoFilmLab. It was shot in the city and metropolitan area of Manaus, Amazon, for seven and a half weeks, between the months of April and June 2018. Its cast and crew are mostly formed by local Amazonian people.

== Release ==
The Fever had its world premiere on August 8, 2019 at the opening of the official competition of the 72nd Locarno International Film Festival, in Switzerland, where it won three awards: the Golden Leopard for Best Actor for Regis Myrupu, the FIPRESCI International Film Critics Award and the Special Award “Environment is Quality of Life” granted by the young jury. The film was shown in more than sixty film festivals afterward, including Toronto International Film Festival, Rotterdam Film Festival and New Director New Films, having received more than thirty awards, including Best Film at the Pingyao International Film Festival (China), Biarritz Festival Latin America (France), IndieLisboa International Film Festival (Portugal), Mar del Plata International Film Festival (Argentina), Festival de Brasilia, and Best Direction at the Chicago International Film Festival (United States) and the Rio Film Festival (Brazil).

The film was released in Brazil by Vitrine Filmes on November 12, 2020, simultaneously on digital streaming platforms and physical cinemas, the latter of which reopened despite to the COVID-19 pandemic. Internationally, it is distributed by KimStim Films in North America, Survivance in France and New Wave Films in the United Kingdom.

The Fever has received positive reviews from Brazilian and foreign film critics. It was listed as the best debut film of 2019 in the critics' list “La internacional cinefilia" by programmer Nicole Brenez. The critic and programmer Diego Batlle gave 4.5 stars out of 5 in the electronic magazine Otroscines and wrote that The Fever “is one of the most convincing debut film in Latin American cinema in recent years”. Nicolás Quinteros, critic from Escribiendo Cine magazine, scored 8 and wrote that “it is an essential film to understand an important part of contemporary Latin American reality”. Francisco Russo, from the electronic magazine AdoroCinema, considered it “a film as rarely seen in Brazilian cinema” and Geraldo Couto from Outras Palavras said that the film is “a milestone” in the way indigenous characters are portrayed in movies. French critic Beatrice Loayza, from Cinema Scope magazine, considered the film “essential cinema, demanding empathy and understanding without pity or didacticism, and spotlighting indigenous people with the attention to cultural specifics that few films bother elaborating".

== Prizes ==
| Year | Festival | Country | Category |
|---|---|---|---|
| 2019 | Locarno International Film Festival | Switzerland | Golden Leopard for Best Actor |
| 2019 | Locarno International Film Festival | Switzerland | International Film Critics Award (FIPRESCI) for Best Film |
| 2019 | Locarno International Film Festival | Switzerland | “Environment is Quality of Life” Special Award by the young jury |
| 2019 | Biarritz Festival Latin America | France | Best Film |
| 2019 | Pingyao International Film Festival | China | Best Film |
| 2019 | Chicago International Film Festival | USA | Best Direction |
| 2019 | Thessaloniki International Film Festival | Greece | Silver Alexander Award |
| 2019 | Mar del Plata Film Festival | Argentina | Best Latin American Film |
| 2019 | Mar del Plata Film Festival | Argentina | Best Opera Prima |
| 2019 | Brasília Film Festival | Brazil | Best Film |
| 2019 | Brasília Film Festival | Brazil | Best Direction |
| 2019 | Brasília Film Festival | Brazil | Best Actor |
| 2019 | Brasília Film Festival | Brazil | Best Cinematography |
| 2019 | Brasília Film Festival | Brazil | Best Sound |
| 2019 | Rio de Janeiro International Film Festival | Brazil | Best Direction |
| 2019 | Rio de Janeiro International Film Festival | Brazil | Special Jury Award for Best Sound |
| 2020 | Lima International Film Festival | Peru | Best Film |
