= Héctor Abad Faciolince =

Colombian novelist, essayist, journalist and editor (born 1958)

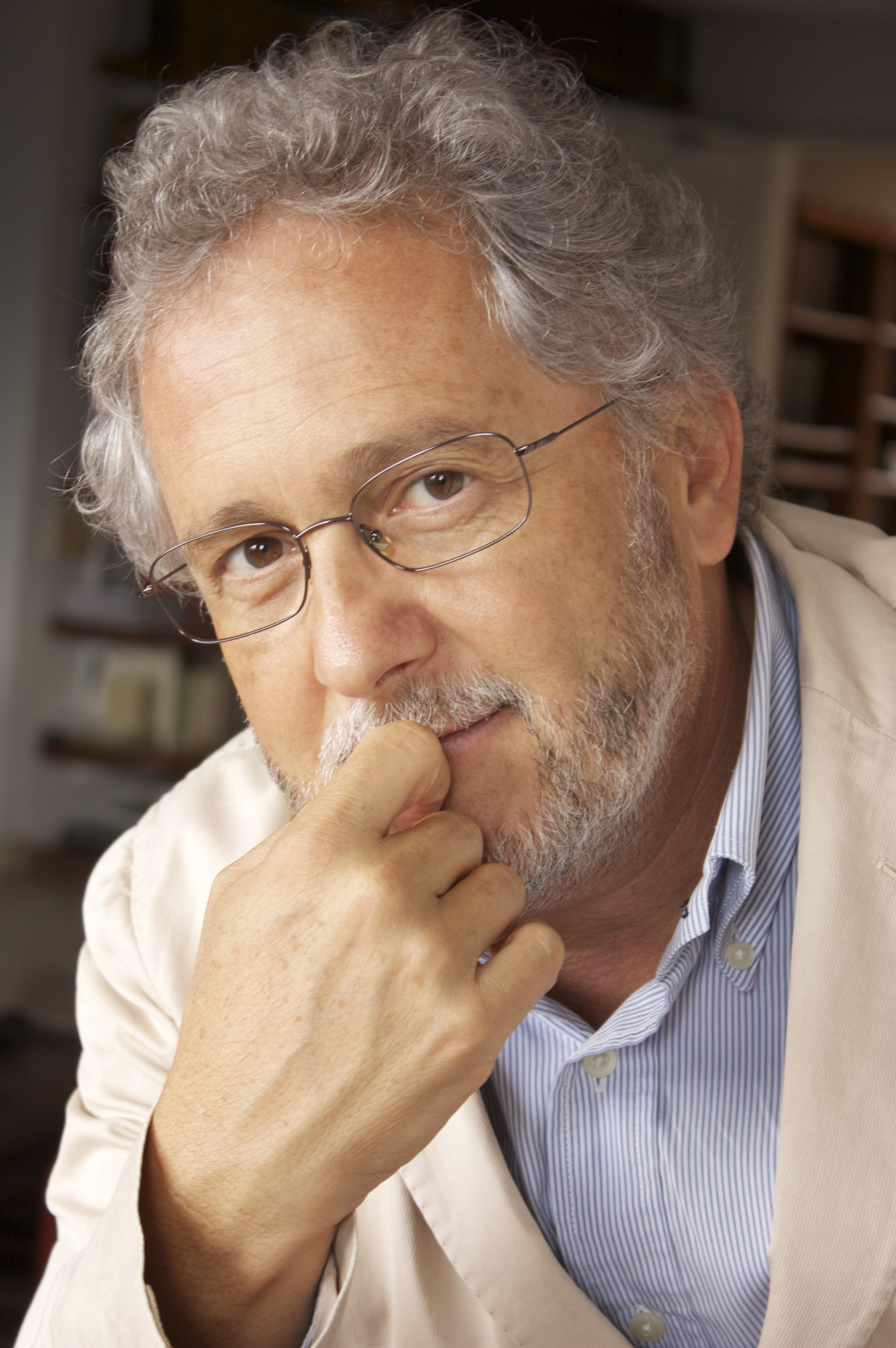
- Born: Héctor Joaquín Abad Faciolince; 1 October 1958 (age 68); Medellín, Colombia
- Occupations: Novelist, essayist, journalist, editor
- Writing career
- Period: 1991–present
- Genres: Essay, fiction, non-fiction
- Movement: Latin American literature

Héctor Abad Faciolince (born 1958) is a Colombian novelist, essayist, journalist, and editor. Abad is considered one of the most talented post-Latin American Boom writers in Latin American literature. Abad is best known for his bestselling novel Angosta and, more recently, El Olvido que Seremos (t. Oblivion: A Memoir).

== Background ==
Héctor Joaquín Abad Faciolince was born and raised in Medellín (Colombia), with five sisters, the son of Cecilia Faciolince and Héctor Abad Gómez. Abad's father was a prominent medical doctor, university professor, and human rights leader whose holistic vision of healthcare led him to found the Colombian National School of Public Health.

After graduating from an Opus Dei-run private Catholic school, Abad moved to Mexico City in 1978 where his father was appointed as Cultural Counselor of the Colombian Embassy in Mexico. While in Mexico, he attended literature, creative writing and poetry workshops at La Casa del Lago, the first off campus cultural center of the National Autonomous University of Mexico.

In 1979, Abad moved back to Medellín and pursued studies in Philosophy and Literature at the Universidad Pontificia Bolivariana. Later in 1982, he was expelled from the University for writing an irreverent article against the Pope. He then moved to Italy and completed studies on Modern Languages and Literature at the University of Turin in 1986. Abad graduated with the highest academic honors of summa cum laude, and his thesis on Guillermo Cabrera Infante's 1967 novel Tres tristes tigres was also awarded "Dignitá di Stampa" (a special distinction that literally means "worthy of publication").

Abad returned to his home town in Colombia in 1987, but later that year his father was murdered by the paramilitaries in a crime that brought about shock in Colombia. Abad himself was threatened with death and had to fly back immediately to Europe; first to Spain and finally to Italy, where he established his residence for the next five years.

While in Italy, Abad worked as a lecturer of Spanish at the University of Verona until 1992. At this time, he also earned a living translating literary works from Italian to Spanish. His translations of Giuseppe Tomasi di Lampedusa's The Siren and Selected Writings, Gesualdo Bufalino's Qui Pro Quo and Umberto Eco's Annotations to The Name of the Rose have been well received critically.

Upon returning to Colombia, Abad was appointed director of the University of Antioquia Journal (1993–1997). Abad has been columnist for prestigious newspapers and magazines in Colombia, such as Revista Cromos, La Hoja, El Malpensante, Revista Semana, and Revista Cambio, the last co-founded by the Nobel Prize–winning Colombian author Gabriel García Márquez. He worked as a journalist for the newspapers El Mundo, El Colombiano, and El Espectador. He is a regular contributor to other Latin American and Spanish papers and magazines.

Abad has been a guest speaker at a number of universities worldwide, including Columbia University, Pennsylvania State University, University of Verona, University of Turin, University of Cagliari, University of Bologna, and University of Florence. He has also been seasonal lecturer at the Università del Piemonte Orientale in Vercelli. Awarded the prestigious German Academic Exchange Service (DAAD) fellowship, Abad lived in Berlin from 2006 to 2007. He later returned to Medellín and was appointed editor-in-chief of the EAFIT University Press. Since May 2008, Abad has been a member of the editorial board of El Espectador, the oldest newspaper in Colombia. In 2014 he was the 31st Samuel Fischer Visiting Professor at the Peter Szondi Institute of Comparative Literature at the Free University of Berlin, where he taught a seminar entitled "Literature and Violence". In 2021-2022 he received the Ida Beam Distinguished Visiting Professorship at Iowa University.

In June 2023, he was injured when two Russian ballistic missiles struck a dining café in Kramatorsk, Ukraine where he was meeting Ukrainian writer Victoria Amelina, who later died as a result of her injuries.

Abad is an atheist.

== Writing ==
Abad started his literary career at a very young age. He was just 12 years old when he wrote his first short stories and poetry works. Abad was twenty one years of age when he was awarded the 1980 Colombian National Short Story Prize for Piedras de Silencio (t. Stones of Silence), a short story about a miner trapped deep underground. While still in Italy, he published his first book, Malos Pensamientos (1991) but it was only upon returning to Colombia in 1993, that Abad become a full-time writer.

Among a notably circle of new Colombian writers such as Santiago Gamboa, Jorge Franco, Laura Restrepo, and others, Abad's literary works often focus on the personality of the narrator and the act of narration in its pursuit of protection and power.

Malos Pensamientos (1991) is a book of short tales about Medellín life back in the 1980s.

Asuntos de un Hidalgo Disoluto (1994; Eng. The Joy of Being Awake, 1996) deliberately models itself on two key 18th-century works: Laurence Sterne's Tristram Shandy and Voltaire's Candide. Narrated by a 71-year-old Colombian millionaire, this work is a Colombian version of the Spanish picaresque novel. Writing at the end of his life, the narrator looks back on his life of debauchery – and the failure of his high pretensions – through reminiscences to his younger mute secretary and lover, Cunegunda Bonaventura.

Tratado de Culinaria para Mujeres Tristes (1996; t: Recipes for Sad Women) is a book of uncertain literary genre that combines a collection of false recipes (coelacanth, dinosaur, or mammoth meat) with real recipes. The book a collection of short reflections about unhappiness.

Fragmentos de Amor Furtivo (1998; t: Fragments of Furtive Love). adopts the framework of the book of One Thousand and One Nights in modified form. Every night, a woman delays her lover's departure by telling him stories of her past lovers. As a background, Abad portraits a 1990s middle-class Medellín as a city besieged by pestilence and disenchantment, the most violent city in the world, where the intensity of violence buried its inhabitants alive. As in the Decameron, Susana and Rodrigo lock themselves up in the hills, far away from the city pestilence, and tell each other stories that would save them from death.

Basura (2000; t: Garbage) is perhaps Abad's most experimental work. It alludes to role models, such as the storytellers Kafka or Pavese who were angst ridden for life, and tells of a writer, Bernardo Davanzati, who tosses his works directly into the garbage can. His neighbour finds the texts and over time turns into an assiduous and diligent reader, to whom the many woes of being a writer are revealed. The act of writing and the role of the reader in literature are topics which are highlighted time and again.

Palabras sueltas (2002; t. Loose Words) is a book of brief cultural and political essays that were compiled from Abad's most successful columns written for newspapers and cultural magazines.

Oriente Empieza en El Cairo (2002; t. East begins in Cairo) is a fascinating chronicle of a man's voyage around the millenary Egypt. The narrator, accompanied by two wives, depicts two versions of the everyday reality of a mythical mega-city that brings memories of other realities, images, and stories lived in distant Medellín.

Angosta (2004). In a fantastical parable of Colombian society, Abad describes a fictitious city whose population has been divided into three different castes living in separate sectors. Against the backdrop of the violent perpetuation of this system, a kaleidoscope of eccentrics from the ruling class is depicted. The novel recreates Colombia's last years of violence with enormous synthetic capacity, complexity and efficiency, and a great deal of knowledge about the conflict.

El Olvido que Seremos (2006; t. Oblivion: A Memoir). It took Abad nearly 20 years to get the courage to write this book about his father's life and the circumstances of his murder by Colombian paramilitaries. The account of a man who fought against oppression, and social inequality and whose voice was silenced by six bullets to the head. The work El Olvido que Seremos was publish successfully 2000 as film under the title Memories of My Father and also as Forgotten We´ll Be by the Spanish film director Fernando Trueba.

Las Formas de la Pereza y Otros Ensayos (2007; t. The Forms of Laziness and Other Essays) is a book about the origin and manifestations of laziness. The author's hypothesis is that laziness would not be a luxury but the original condition of human existence, and the starting point of all subsequent human creations.

An extensive bibliography about his writings has been prepared by Professor Augusto Escobar Mesa from the University of Antioquia, and the Université de Montréal.

=== Columnist ===
After college, he wrote in newspapers such as El Espectador and continued for more than 15 years. In Abad's writings, one can see his incisive character when writing about controversial subjects such as globalization, religion, corruption, etc. Jiménez confirms that one can see the reoccurring themes in Abad's columns, which are: rhetoric, personal themes, writing jobs, literary structures, phobias, science, against globalization, Medellín and religion.

In the newspaper El Espectador, Abad publishes a weekly column where he expresses his opinion. By doing this, he allows one to see sections that talk about writing and grammar in the 21st century.

Abad, in literature magazines like El Malpensante, exhibits his critical view of literature, what he considers to be a good writer and a good book. One can find articles like Por qué es tan malo Paulo Coelho, where one can infer things such as:

If Coelho sells more books than all of the other Brazilian writers combined, then that means his books are foolish and elementary. If they were profound books, literarily complex, with serious ideas and well elaborated, the public would not buy them because the masses tend to be uneducated and have very bad taste.

Abad does not try to be a best-seller but creates complete characters like Gaspar Medina in the novel Asuntos de un hidalgo disoluto, where one can see Medina's periodization of being an hidalgo and dissolute. Or, likewise, explain relevant themes like in his novel Angosta where it "takes elements of actual Colombian reality like poverty, subjects of economics and politics, subversive groups, etc. later for parody and exaggeration in the near future."

== Bibliography ==
=== Novels ===
- —— (1994). Asuntos de un Hidalgo Disoluto (in Spanish). Bogotá: Tercer Mundo. ISBN 9789588061474.
  - The Joy of Being Awake. Brookline Books. 1996. ISBN 9781571290205.
- —— (1998). Fragmentos de Amor Furtivo [Fragments of Furtive Love] (in Spanish). Bogotá: Alfaguara. ISBN 9789588061030.
- —— (2000). Basura [Garbage] (in Spanish). Madrid: Lengua de Trapo. ISBN 9788489618442.
- —— (2004). Angosta (in Spanish). Bogotá: Seix-Barral. ISBN 9789584207647.
- —— (2006). El Olvido que Seremos (in Spanish). Bogotá: Planeta Colombiana. ISBN 9788420426402.
  - Oblivion. New York: Farrar, Straus and Giroux. 2012. ISBN 9780374223977.
- —— (2008). El Amanecer de un Marido [The Awakening of a Husband] (in Spanish). Bogotá: Seix-Barral. ISBN 9788432212840.
- —— (2014). La Oculta (in Spanish). Bogotá: Alfaguara. ISBN 9788420400761.
  - The Farm. Archipelago Press. 2018. ISBN 9780914671923.
- —— (2022). Salvo mi corazón, todo está bien (in Spanish). Bogotá: Alfaguara. ISBN 9788420461854.
  - Aside From My Heart, All Is Well. Archipelago Press. 2026. ISBN 9781962770590.

=== Short fiction ===
- —— (1991). Malos Pensamientos (in Spanish). Editorial Universidad de Antioquia. ISBN 9789589021323.
- —— (2009). Traiciones de la Memoria [Treasons of Memory] (in Spanish). Bogotá: Alfaguara. ISBN 9789587049237.

=== Poetry ===
- —— (2011). Testamento involuntario (in Spanish). Bogotá: Alfaguara. ISBN 9789587583496.

=== Non-fiction ===
- —— (1996). Tratado de Culinaria para Mujeres Tristes (in Spanish). Medellín: Alfaguara. ISBN 9788420407906.
  - Recipes for Sad Women. Pushkin Press. 2012. ISBN 9781906548636.
- —— (2002). Palabras Sueltas [Loose Words] (in Spanish). Bogotá: Seix-Barral. ISBN 9789584203465.
- —— (2002). Oriente Empieza en El Cairo (in Spanish). Barcelona: Grijalbo-Mondadori. ISBN 9788439709152.
- —— (2007). Las Formas de la Pereza y Otros Ensayos [The Forms of Laziness and Other Essays] (in Spanish). Bogotá: Alfaguara. ISBN 9789587045116.
- —— (2019). Lo que fue presente (in Spanish). Bogotá: Alfaguara. ISBN 9788420435404.
- —— (2025). Ahora y en la hora (in Spanish). Bogotá: Alfaguara. ISBN 9788410496316.

== Awards and honors ==
- 1980: Colombian National Short Story Prize for Piedras de Silencio
- 1996: National Creative Writing Scholarship; Colombian Ministry of Culture for Fragmentos de Amor Furtivo.
- 1998: Simón Bolívar National Prize in Journalism.
- 2000: 1st Casa de America Award for Innovative American Narrative for Basura.
- 2004: Best Spanish Language Book of the Year (People's Republic of China) for Angosta.
- 2006: German Academic Exchange Service (DAAD) fellowship.
- 2007: National Book Award; Libros & Letras Latin American and Colombian Cultural Magazine for El Olvido que Seremos.
- 2007: Simón Bolívar National Prize in Journalism.
- 2010: Casa de America Latina, Lisboa.
- 2012: WOLA-Duke University Human Rights Book Award.
- 2015: Cálamo Award, Best Book of the year for La Oculta.
