= Cholo (film) =

- Theatrical poster
- Directed by: Bernardo Batievsky
- Release date: May 18, 1972
- Country: Peru

Cholo is a Peruvian film from 1972 directed by Bernardo Batievsky that tells the story of the Peruvian football player Hugo Sotil.

== Synopsis ==
A young provincial painter migrates to Lima, where he finds a hostile and racist city. His football ability makes him reach sporting fame by traveling to several European countries.

== Production ==
After surviving a heart attack in the early 1970s, Batievsky began writing and later directing a film about football starring the successful football player Hugo Sotil. The film was released on May 18, 1972 in fifteen theaters in Lima. A week after its release, the director had the film removed from the billboard after receiving negative reviews.

The music was in charge of the Peruvian group El Polen.

=== Restoration ===
Andrea Franco Batievsky, the director's granddaughter, oversaw the restoration process of Cholo and Mirage at the UCLA Film & Television Archive.
