= History of Colombia (1930–1946) =

The history of Colombia from 1930 to 1946 corresponds with the period of Colombian history in which the Liberal Party the country dominated politics. It lasted 16 years and had to grapple with the effects of the Great Depression. Also, during this period, there was great bi-partisan controversy, which created many internal conflicts. One of the major problems of the crisis was the dependency of Colombia in the United States for the purchasing of coffee, which was the backbone of its economy.

The economic crisis in Colombia during the period of 1928 through 1933 was a devastating result of the previous years of prosperity based on high amounts of international loans and credits, high prices in exporting coffee, and a confident country that generated investment and cash flow. The same way Colombia prospered thanks to the US, it went down parallel to it in their time of crisis. The New York stock market collapsed, and the confidence within the country was low and protective. The investment stopped, as well as the loans, and Colombia was directly affected by that situation. There was a constant decrease in the exporting potential product of Colombia, coffee, as well as a cut in the international loans and investment. Eventually, the crisis in the U.S.A. generated a cut in urban employment within Colombia, diminished internal market, and other problematic social and economic situations.

From the year 1933 to the year 1939, Colombia began to see a significant change in the country's industries, leaving behind the problems of urbanization in the twenties. Therefore, there was also an extensive agricultural development, strengthening the development of the economy and expansion of agriculture and livestock. During this period, coffee exports were very high. Coffee farmers managed to expand their crops; with the help of politics, they also tried promoting agriculture with the help of the “Consejo Nacional de Agricultura.”

== Economic crisis (1928–1933) ==
From 1922 to 1928, the two main factors that took over and increased Colombia's economy were the rise in external coffee prices (the main exportation product) and a massive increase in the international credits to the public and the bank system. An incredible amount of money was flowing within the country, with prosperity yet to be paid. Therefore, the economic success was not internally based and sustained; divergently, the economy was holding on to the United States credits and investment. That was the mistake, and that was the cause of the future crisis.

1928 significantly reduced external credit, generating a constant decline in the domestic bank credits and a holdback of Bogotá and Medellín stock markets. Throughout 1929 the international coffee prices continued declining abruptly in addition to the New York stock market, and eventually, the first manifestations of urban unemployment boost generated an immediate internal market crisis. From that moment on till 1932, deflection resulted from the international price reduction of Colombian exporting products. It was only until 1932 that the rise in gold production compensated the external debt as well as created commercial balance, ultimately preventing the continuous loss in reserves.

After Colombia was able to defend its currency, it was in search of a new economic politic. This was based on three pillars; fiscal, monetary, and costumes or external commerce. The problem was that free trade was established, and the lack of government intervention in the economy was induced. International imports were not charged as much taxes supposedly to pay off the increase of living expenses, this did not generate any positive results, and by 1931 a protectionist economy reestablished to reanimate the public investment. Colombia found itself within the countries that had to surrender to their exchange freedom and abandon the gold reserves to devalue their currency against gold and dollars. In the long run, it was a reaction to the collapse of international reserves.

Parallel to the causes of the economic crisis in Colombia, the presidents in charge of the time (Abadia Mendez and Enrique Olaya Herrera) hastily reduced the public investment programs, causing a decline in the previous infrastructure privileged circumstances. This ultimately affected public employment and finances.

It was only until 1933 that the government gave a tremendous tip to its economic matters. It focused more on recuperating and reanimating the local product market, returned to the coffee exportation as a main economic sustains, and finally emphasized the improvements in domestic credits. The two main sections that favored the new economic measures were agricultural and industrial. Basically, because the loads of people who moved to the cities in search of work went back to the rural areas to work on agriculture which was productively exported again. Also, the industrial sector was favored due to the substitution of importation products by Colombian goods. These were the actions that Colombia took in order to take control over the economy once again and recuperate after five years of crisis.

== Liberal republic (1930–1946) ==
The Colombian government came from a long period of being conservative until the year 1930. This year in the elections, the liberal party started to take control. A period of social, political, and economic controversy was about to begin. The growing economic crisis and the way the conservative government handled the country's problems made them lose many followers, therefore losing their next elections. The most noticeable and immediate change was the sudden deterioration of the country's public order. Colombia also suffered a period of violence, not only with the internal conflicts but also with other countries. The violent issues and the global economic crisis were what were shouting for a new regimen.

The United States was not only providing investment; it was also producing internal violence. One example is how United Fruit Company could manipulate the government and reach what they wanted no matter the cost. It started when the company complains to the government that the workers were refusing to do their jobs because they were on strike. The government ordered the military to go to where they were and threaten the workers they would shoot if they did not work. The workers refused to work, and there was when the military killed approximately 3000. Another violence problem in Colombia during the liberal party period was how the guerrilla groups started to form. This was created because the liberals were protecting themselves from the conservatives; this was a bipartisan violent problem.

When the liberals took over the government, one of Colombia's major problems was that they had not been in control for almost half a century. Part of the problem was that the liberals still accused the conservatives of things that were already left in the past and were not relevant in the present. This was a real big issue because many ideas and situations had already changed or disappeared with the conservative government. A fact worth mentioning, the loyalty of liberalism ideas was not based on what each person believes, but it was more an obligation that came from many years back, in other words, inherited hatred. Even though these problems did affect the relationship between these two parties, the government included some conservative members in the cabinet to make the transition easier. This would make the overall government ideas liberals but would also have some conservative influences.

The first liberal president during this period was Enrique Olaya Herrera. He took measures over how to handle the economic crisis, one of the measures he took was devaluing the currency to make the international exports more competitive and stimulate the industry. Something Olaya Herrera decided was essential to get over the crisis was making even stronger the relation between Colombia and U.S.A., so there was a chance that their vast resources would help resist the depression. Olaya also sustained the external debt, not letting it get out of control. He also gave importance to the workers and women. He made a law that the working day could not be more than eight hours and the legal right to organize unions. For the women, Olaya gave them the legal rights to own their own properties. In the girls´ schools, he said that they could have high school; that before was forbidden.

President Alfonso Lopez Pumarejo led the second liberal government. Many situations in his presidency were influenced by the New Deal and much idealism from Franklin D. Roosevelt. Most of the time, he dedicated himself to solving social bipartisan issues. Lopez called this “Revolucion en Marcha,” or revolution underway. Part of this process was helping the poor to participate in the system's benefit. This would also make the parties be more pacific and not use violence as a solution. One of the measures he took was making a new agrarian reform. This consisted of giving the peasants in non-legal land legal land to work on them. Lopez's administration was recognized for being the protector of the working class. He created something significant that was the CTC or the Colombian Worker Confederation. Lopez also increased public spending in public education and rural roads. He finished his presidency by making various changes to the constitution. He said that the started would have more power over economic issues, eliminating the article that said that public education had to agree with catholic religion; finally, he eliminated the literacy requirements to vote. In conclusion, Lopez's main contribution was making Colombia face for the first time its social issues.

== Economy 1930–1946 ==
It was until 1930 that Colombia's political government was steady and managed to grow economically. Since the beginning of the century, new routes have developed, especially those of coffee. The crop production was so good that its consumption was larger each time, bringing money invested in new oil companies and product consumption. In 1930, when the Liberal party was able to retake power, new reform started to come up, and slowly the economy went down.

The economy in Colombia around World War II was divided into two extensive periods: from 1930 to 1939, in which the country experienced a tremendous increase and a new social transformation. 1939–1945, the economy was stagnant, and at the same time, the social transformation was not progressing at all. Although some countries around the world had trouble coming back from the crisis, Colombia was one of the few that had a swift and sustainable recovery in order to develop its agricultural sector, coffee production, and oil exploitations.

If we look at the economy from 1933 to 1939, we will see an extensive duplication in industrial production, growing by almost 11% annually; which no other country could accomplish. Although the increase was spectacular, we had to consider what the CEPAL organization said: “if we have a good growing rhythm, we need to think about the low initial level, which can cause future plans”.

The investor ignored the organization's fundamental fact, which created new textile, shoes, and expanding food companies. By 1939 all of these developed a considerable increase in the domestic demand and nearly 2,805 manufacturing companies led to low import demand. Using these as a method was not as good as expected since other countries could see this as a closing trade action.
