= Chola Chabuca =

Peruvian drag queen

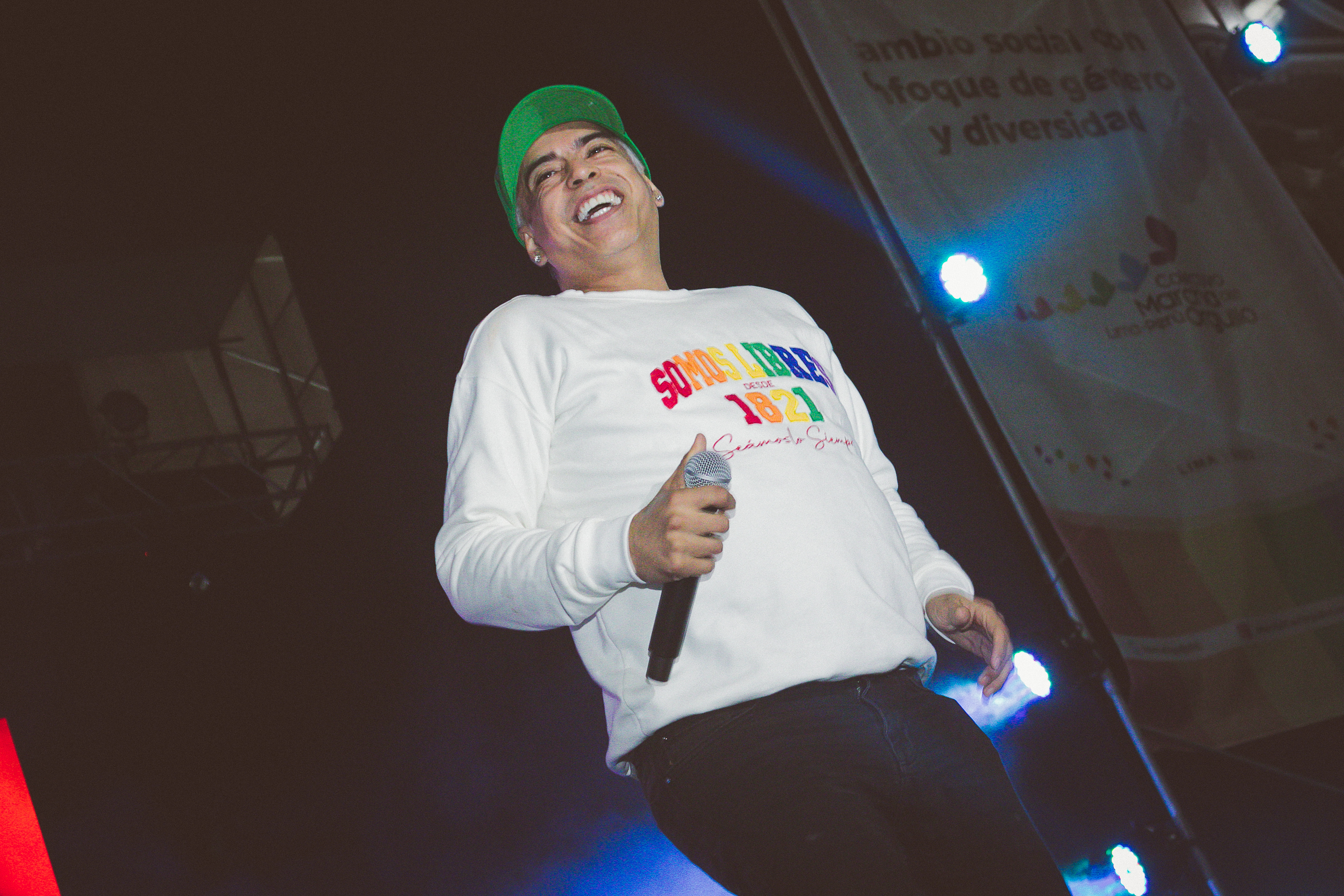
- Pimentel in 2022
- Born: Ernesto Pimentel Yesquén; September 20, 1970 (age 55)
- Occupations: Television personality, drag queen

Ernesto Pimentel Yesquén (born September 20, 1970), also known by his stage name La Chola Chabuca, is a popular Peruvian television personality. He has had a show on América Televisión for the past 15 years.

Pimentel takes his stage name "La Chola" from the Peruvian term for women who live in the mountains of Peru. He fashions his costumes based on their traditional dress. Unlike other Peruvian entertainers, though, he aims to glamorize these women with beautiful dresses. As a result, he is particularly popular with the rural population of Peru.

Pimentel's career until the early 1990s was as his La Chola persona. He currently produces and stars in the La Chola Chabuca Circo (Circus), a popular annual event in July and August. Pimental is also a real estate entrepreneur involved in residential real estate construction.

== TV shows ==
- Risas y salsa (1996-1997)
- Aló Chabuca (1996-1997)
- Risas de América (1998, 2012-2013)
- Chola de Miércoles (1997-1999)
- Más Chola que Nunca (2000-2001)
- Hola Chola (2001)
- Más Chola Latina (2001-2002)
- Sabadazo (2002)
- Recargados de risa (2005-2011)
- Gud nay Chabuca (2014)
- Esta noche (2013-2014).
- El reventonazo de la chola (since 2015).
