= Maya Da-Rin =

Brazilian filmmaker

- Born: Maya Werneck Da-Rin; January 2, 1979 (age 47); Rio de Janeiro, Brazil
- Education: Pontifical Catholic University of Rio de Janeiro (PUC-Rio); University of Sorbonne Nouvelle Paris 3
- Occupations: film director; screenwriter; film producer
- Years active: 2002—present

Maya Da-Rin (born January 2, 1979) is a Brazilian film director, screenwriter, film producer and artist.

== Biography ==
Maya Da-Rin was born in Rio de Janeiro on January 2, 1979. With a degree in Industrial Design from Pontifical Catholic University of Rio de Janeiro, Maya Da-Rin has attended film workshops at the International Film and TV School of San Antonio de los Baños, Cuba. She lived in France between 2010 and 2016, where she graduated with honors at Le Fresnoy Studio - Studio National des Arts Contemporains and attended a master's degree in Cinema and Art History at University of Sorbonne Nouvelle Paris 3 . Da-Rin is a founding partner of Tamanduá Vermelho, a production company created in 2015 in Rio de Janeiro.

== Career ==
Maya Da-Rin began her career as a director with the short film documentary The Word Tilts to Here (2002), about orality in a rural community in the interior of the Minas Gerais' state, in Brazil. After that, she shot two documentaries in the southwest of the Amazonas: Margem (2007), follows the journey of a large passenger boat from the Brazilian border to the city of Iquitos, in Peru. The film has been shown at several film festivals and art shows, such as the 29th São Paulo Art Biennial, the Havana Film Festival and the Toulouse Latin American Film Festival. Her next film, Lands (2009), is a documentary essay on the triple border between Brazil, Colombia and Peru, also in the Amazon. The film premiered at the Locarno International Festival and was shown in more than forty festivals and museums around the world, such as DOK Leipzig, São Paulo International Film Festival, MoMA e New Museum of Contemporary Art. Lands received the "Las Cámaras de La Diversidad" award at the Guadalajara International Film Festival (Mexico), among other prizes. Variety magazine considered the film "a gorgeous work of art".

In 2011, during her residency at Le Fresnoy, made the short film French Version (2011), which appropriates the dialogues of iconic French films to depict two foreigners who meet in a hotel room, in Paris. The film received the Jury's Mention and the RTP “Onda Curta” acquisition award at the Luso-Brazilian Film Festival (Portugal).

In the following years, Da-Rin made two video installations: Event Horizon (2012), also produced by Le Fresnoy, and Camouflage (2013), made during an artistic residency at the LABoral Centro de Arte y Creación Industrial, in Spain. Event Horizon was considered by French critic Annick Rivoire "the most representative project of contemporary art" shown that year at Le Fresnoy. The work was exhibited at the Contemporary Art Centre, in Vilnius (Lithuania) and at the La Maldite Gallery, in Paris.

=== The Fever ===
Her first fictional feature film, The Fever (2019) was developed with the support of the Cinéfondation screenplay residency from the Cannes Film Festival as well as of the TorinoFilmLab. The film premiered at the official competition of the Locarno Festival, in Switzerland, where it won the Golden Leopard for Best Actor for Regis Myrupu, the FIPRECI International Film Critics Award and the Young Jury Prize. The Fever took part in more than sixty film festivals and received thirty awards, including Best Film at Pingyao International Film Festival (China), Biarritz Film Festival (France), IndieLisboa (Portugal), Mar del Plata International Film Festival (Argentina), Festival de Brasília (Brazil) e Best Direction at Chicago International Film Festival (USA) and Rio International Film Festival (Brazil).

The Fever had an excellent reception by Brazilian and international critics. It was considered by critic and programmer Diego Batlle “the most convincing debut film in Latin American cinema in recent years". Francisco Russo, critic of the electronic magazine AdoroCinema, considered The Fever "a film as rarely seen in Brazilian cinema", while critic José Geraldo Couto said the film is “a milestone” in the way indigenous characters are portrayed in movies. French critic Beatrice Loayza, from Cinema Scope magazine, considered the film “essential cinema, demanding empathy (...) and spotlighting indigenous people with an attention to its cultural specifics that few films are able to elaborate ".

== Filmography ==
Year	Original title	English release title	Role	Notes
2002	E Agora José?		Director	Documentary Short Film
2007	Margem	Margin	Director	Documentary Medium-Length Film
2009	Terras	Lands	Director	Documentary Feature Film
2011	Versão Francesa	French Version	Director	Fictional Short Film
2019	A Febre	The Fever	Director	Fictional Feature Film
