= Sube a mi nube =

- Theatrical release poster
- Directed by: Sergio Barrio
- Produced by: Victoria Aizenstat; Mauro Guevara; Gustavo Sánchez; Norma Velasquez
- Starring: Silvana Cañote
- Music by: Karin Zielinski
- Production company: La Soga Producciones
- Distributed by: BF Distribución
- Release date: September 19, 2024
- Running time: 110 minutes
- Country: Peru
- Language: Spanish

Sube a mi nube (lit. 'Climb to my cloud') is a 2024 Peruvian melodrama film directed by Sergio Barrio, inspired by the life and tragedy surrounding the death of Mónica Santa María, presenter of the children's program Nubeluz. Starring Silvana Cañote accompanied by Alessa Wichtel, Andrés Wiese, Christian Thorsen and Javier Delgiudice.

== Synopsis ==
Mónica, one of the hosts of the children's program Sube a mi nube, tries to battle and live up to the fame that comes with being happy and optimistic all the time, which leaves her vulnerable to the dangers of her environment and her own mental health.

== Cast ==
The actors participating in this film are:

- Silvana Cañote as Mónica Santa María
- Alessa Wichtel as Almendra Gomelsky
- Andrés Wiese as Constantino Heredia
- Christian Thorsen as Joaquín, producer of the program
- Javier Delgiudice as Samuel, senior executive of Panamericana Televisión
- Emilia Somocurcio as Lilianne Braun
- Juan Ignacio Di Marco as Marco
- Gabriel González as Marcelo Serrano
- Job Mansilla as Rolo
- Sergio Barrio as Cusi Barrio
- Pedro Sessarego as Pepe Mansur
- Marialola Arispe as Marcia
- Paco Varela as Camera director

== Production ==
Principal photography began on February 26, 2024, and lasted a month in Lima, Peru.

== Release ==
It premiered on September 19, 2024, in Peruvian theaters.

== Accolades ==
Year	Award / Festival	Category	Recipient	Result	Ref.
2025	2024 APRECI Awards	Best Leading Actress	Silvana Cañote	Pending	
