= Voter registration =

Requirement, and process, of a person's enrollment in order to vote in elections

In electoral systems, voter registration (or enrollment) is the requirement that a person otherwise eligible to vote must register (or enroll) on an electoral roll, which is usually a prerequisite for being entitled or permitted to vote.

The rules governing registration vary between jurisdictions. In many jurisdictions, registration may be automatic and involves extracting the names and other relevant personal information, such as age and residential address, of citizens eligible to vote from official government processes such as a general-use population register usually ahead of election day. In some jurisdictions, registration may require an eligible voter to apply to be registered or re-registered or registration details being updated when they change residence or other relevant information changes.

Some jurisdictions have "election day registration" and others do not require registration, or may require the production of evidence of entitlement to vote at the time of voting. In jurisdictions where registration is not mandatory, an effort may be made to encourage persons otherwise eligible to vote to register, in what is called as a voter registration drive. In countries where resident registration is compulsory, voter registration usually does not exist, since voter eligibility can be determined from the residence register.

Even in countries where registration is the individual's responsibility, many reformers, seeking to maximize voter turnout, argue for a wider availability of the required forms, or more ease of process by having more places where they can register. In the United States, for example, the National Voter Registration Act of 1993 ("Motor Voter Law") and similar laws require states to offer voter registration at motor vehicle departments (driver's license offices) as well as disability centers, public schools, and public libraries, in order to offer more access to the system. State authorities are also required to accept mail-in voter registrations. Many jurisdictions also offer online registrations.

In the Bahamas, a little more than half of the adult citizens are registered to vote.

== By country ==
Systems of voter registration vary widely from country to country, and sometimes among lower jurisdictions, such as states or provinces. In some countries, voters are automatically added to the rolls when they reach legal voting age. In others, potential voters are required to apply to be added to the rolls.

=== Australia ===
In Australia, it is compulsory for eligible voters, that is all citizens 18 years of age or above, to register to vote. The Australian Electoral Commission maintains Australia's federal electoral roll. Each state also has its own electoral commission or office, but voters need to register only with the AEC, which shares the registration details with the relevant state electoral commission.

=== Belgium ===
Before an election, each municipality compiles a list of eligible voters based on the digital and continuously updated National Register (the database of all citizens). The authorities automatically send a voter invitation card to each voter before an election.

However, non-citizens do have to register if they wish to vote. Generally, fewer than 20% of eligible non-citizens do so.

=== Canada ===
In Canada, the National Register of Electors is a continuously updated permanent database of eligible electors for federal elections in Canada maintained by Elections Canada. In the 1990s Canada adopted an opt-in process, by which voters mark their consent to be added the national register on their annual income tax returns.

The Register is also updated using the following sources:

- provincial and territorial motor vehicle registrars
- Canada Revenue Agency
- Citizenship and Immigration Canada
- provincial and territorial vital statistics registrars, and provincial electoral agencies with permanent lists of electors (e.g. British Columbia and Quebec)
- information supplied by electors when they register to vote or revise their information during and between federal electoral events
- proven electoral lists from other Canadian jurisdictions

Same-day registration is also permitted.

=== Chile ===
Since 2012, voter registration in Chile is automatic. It is based on a database by the Civil Registry Office of Chileans and resident foreigners in possession of an identity card number, which is unique for each individual when issued and is never re-used after a person's death. All Chileans and eligible foreigners are added automatically to the electoral roll at age 17 and placed on an electoral constituency based on their last reported address with the Office. That address, known as "electoral domicile," can be different from a person's living address, if so desired. The electoral roll may contain a substantial number of persons residing abroad. Residents abroad are not allowed to vote in Chilean elections.

=== Czech Republic ===
All citizens and residents are included in the national register. Each person is assigned a personal identification number that includes the person's date of birth and is divisible by 11.

=== Denmark ===
All citizens and residents of Denmark are included in the national register, Det Centrale Personregister. Each person is assigned a personal number of ten digits, which include the person's date of birth. The register is used for tax lists, voter lists, membership in the universal health care system, official record of residence, and other purposes. All eligible voters receive a card in the mail before each election which shows the date, time and local polling place; it may only be presented at the designated local polling station. Only citizens may vote in national elections, while long-time residents may vote in local and regional elections. Permanent address within Denmark is required in order to vote. Voting is voluntary.

=== Estonia ===
Every citizen has a personal identification code assigned since birth. Every citizen becomes automatically eligible to vote the day they turn 18. No special notifications are sent and voting is not compulsory. Everyone older than 16 who is a permanent resident (whether a citizen of Estonia, EU, or other) can vote in local elections depending on where they have registered their official residence.

=== Finland ===
Voter registration in Finland is automatic and based on the national population register. Each citizen is assigned an identification number at birth. Permanent residents are recorded in this register even if they are not citizens, and their citizenship status is indicated in the register. People in the register are legally obliged to notify the register keeper of changes of address. Changing the address in the register automatically notifies all other public bodies (for example the tax district for local taxation, the social security authorities, the conscription authorities) and certain trusted private ones (e.g. banks and insurance companies), making the process of moving residence very simple. Close to election time, the government mails a notification to registered persons informing them of the election and where and when to cast their votes. Only citizens may vote in national elections, but all residents may vote in local elections.

=== Germany ===
In Germany, there is no separate voter registration, as resident registration is compulsory.

All permanent residents of Germany are required to register their place of residence (or the fact that they are homeless) with local government. Citizens who will be 18 or older on the day of voting automatically receive a notification card in the mail some weeks before any election in which they are eligible to vote: for local elections, resident citizens of other EU countries will also receive these cards and may vote. Polling places have lists of all eligible voters resident in the neighborhood served by the particular station; the voter's notification card (or photo ID such as an identity card or passport if the notification card is not at hand) is checked against these lists before individuals receive a ballot. Voting is not compulsory.

Greece

In Greece voter registration is automatic. Each municipality prepares every year a list of names who are registered in the municipal rolls and will acquire the right to vote in the following year. These lists are then added to the file of electoral rolls on January 1st of the following year. The Mayor submits every two months a statement which includes all changes that have occurred in the municipal records due to death, relocation and acquisition or loss of Greek Citizenship. Voters can check their registration status online.

=== Hong Kong ===
In Hong Kong all permanent residents who are above 18 years of age and do not suffer from a mental illness can register as voters. Imprisoned people can also register and vote since the laws prohibiting them from voting was ruled unconstitutional in 2009 and are able to vote since mid-2010 as the electoral roll is updated annually. The registration process is voluntary. In 2002 around 1.6 million permanent residents did not register.

=== Iceland ===
All citizens of Iceland are registered in a central database at birth, which is maintained by Registers Iceland. They do not need to register separately to vote.

=== India ===
The Government of India conducts a revision of the voters list every 5 years. An additional summary revision is conducted every year. Apart from this, citizens can request their inclusion in the voters list by applying through Form 6. If the application is valid, the applicant's name will get included in the list. At 18 years old, completed person should be eligible for voter list (for Indian citizens only).

=== Israel ===
In Israel, all citizens who are 18 years of age or older on election day are automatically registered to vote.

=== Italy ===
In Italy, all municipalities have a registry of residents and a registry of eligible voters. This is revised every six months and whenever there is an election. The registry of eligible voters can be viewed by anyone to ensure maximum transparency in the electoral process. All citizens aged 18 or more on the election day are automatically registered to vote.

=== Kazakhstan ===
In Kazakhstan, voter registration for general elections is conducted by local executive bodies (akimats). Citizens aged 18 and above can register to vote at their relevant akimats upon announcement or appointment of elections, provided they provide their identification number. Verification of inclusion or correctness of data in the electoral roll can be done 15 days before election day at corresponding election commission premises. Special arrangements are made for voter registration in various locations, with different timelines depending on the type of election and location.

Absentee voting requires notifying the akimat of a new residence at least thirty days before the election, while citizens abroad must register with their foreign precinct election commission using a valid Kazakhstani passport.

=== Mexico ===
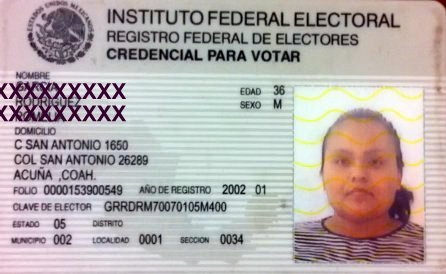
Voter ID card from Mexico

Mexico has a general electoral census. Any citizen of age 18 or greater must go to an electoral office in order be registered into the electoral census. Citizens receive a Voter Credential card (credencial de elector con fotografía), issued by the National Electoral Institute (INE) (from 1990 until 4/2014 it was called Federal Electoral Institute) that must be shown to vote in any election. The voting card also serves as a national identity document.

=== Netherlands ===
No separate voter registration: all eligible voters receive an invitation with a poll card using the national Civil registration (Basic Registry of Persons). Voters must present a valid ID that has not expired for more than 5 years at the polling station. Eligibility varies depending on the type of election. For national and provincial elections, only Dutch civilians are permitted to vote, while for European Parliament elections one has to have the nationality of an EU member state. In municipal elections, eligibility is dependent on the place of residency on nomination day, with non-EU nationals also having voting rights when they have been living in the Netherlands legally for five years or more.

=== Norway ===
There is no separate voter registration: All eligible voters can automatically vote. Citizens and residents of Norway are included in the national register, Folkeregisteret, where each person is assigned a personal number of eleven digits which include the person's date of birth. The register is used for tax lists, voter lists, membership in the universal health care system and other purposes, and it is maintained by the tax authorities. People in the register are legally obliged to notify the register keeper of changes of address, no sooner than 31 days before, and no later than 8 days after a change of address. Changing the address in the register automatically notifies other public bodies (for example the tax district for local taxation, the social security authorities, the conscription authorities), making the process of moving residence very simple. Before an election, all eligible voters receive a letter with information about where and when they can cast their vote. This letter also confirms that you are listed as an eligible voter, and is sent out digitally to most voters. Those who have opted out of digital communication with the public sector, receive it by mail. Voters are assigned to a district based on the official address of residence per 30 June in the election year. Elections are normally held the 2nd Monday of September. Voters may vote early in any district in the country, usually at city hall or similar, or in embassies and consulates abroad. Early voting starts in July, and ends about a week before election day. Only citizens may vote in national elections, while longtime residents may vote in local and regional elections. Voting is not compulsory.

=== Peru ===
All citizens of Peru between 18 and 70 years are registered to vote through the National Registry of Identification and Civil Status, except all members of the police and the armed forces, who are not allowed to participate in elections. For all citizens in the country and abroad voting is mandatory, unless legally exempted. Failing to vote in the election of 7 Oct 2018 was fined with S/ 83, with 50% or 75% discount for areas with poverty or extreme poverty, and this must be paid to get access to many public services.

=== Philippines ===
Filipino citizens who are at least 18 years of age are eligible to register to vote. A voter’s ID is issued if the requirements are met. In 2022, there were 1.7 million registered voters living overseas who were eligible to vote in national elections.

=== South Korea ===
There is no formal process for voter registration for South Korean citizens. All citizens will be automatically listed in the voters' list upon each election date. A domestic in-absentee vote was ceased and citizens can visit any residents' center (주민센터) and vote in advance during the weekend before the actual election date.

However, citizens either temporary visiting or permanently residing abroad must register for an overseas in-absentee ballot in order to vote. Voting can be done in Korean overseas missions.

=== Spain ===
No registration is required: all Spanish citizens of voting age are listed in the electoral roll through the National Statistics Institute's Electoral Census Office. Only citizens may vote in national and regional elections, while foreign residents may vote in local elections upon a reciprocity basis. Citizens from other European Union countries may also vote in European elections. Certain convicted felons are disenfranchised while serving their sentences, but their voting rights are automatically restored afterwards without exception. Most prisoners are not disenfranchised and can vote by mail as absentees.

All eligible voters receive a letter in the mail to their registered address prior to election Sunday showing the date, time and local polling place, which is almost invariably the nearest school or the town hall in very small towns without a school. Polling may also be done at a Spanish diplomatic mission if residing overseas. All absentee and early voting ballots are sent physically to the registered local polling station for counting and double checking the voter's identity with the electoral roll eliminating any risk of double voting. Government-issued ID is required to vote. Voting is not compulsory.

=== Sweden ===
Voter registration in Sweden is automatic and based on the national population register, Folkbokföringsregistret, administered by the Swedish Tax Agency, where all citizens and residents of Sweden are included. Permanent residents are recorded in this register even if they are not citizens but enjoy right of residence, and their citizenship status is indicated in the register.

Only Swedish citizens being 18 years old on the election day and living in Sweden may vote in all public elections. Registered residents may vote in local and regional elections if they are citizens of another EU Member State, Iceland or Norway. Citizens of other countries and stateless persons can vote in the municipal and county elections if they have been recorded in the Swedish Population Register for at least three consecutive years before election day. Swedish citizens that are resident abroad have the right to vote in Riksdag and EU elections only. To maintain a record in the electoral roll as an expatriate, one needs to refresh the registration within 10 years; a vote counts as a valid refresh.

All eligible voters receive a letter in the mail to their registered address of 30 days prior to election day, in Sweden or abroad, which shows the date (always on a Sunday, normally in September every 4 years), time and local polling place. Polling may also be done anywhere in the country at various early voting stations determined by the local election commission or at a Swedish diplomatic mission, all to facilitate for the voters.

=== Taiwan ===
All citizens of Taiwan are registered in a national database at birth, which is maintained by the Household Registration Office and the Central Election Commission of Taiwan. Taiwanese citizens do not need to register separately to vote, whereas all citizens above twenty years old will be automatically informed by postal mail from the government few weeks before every public election.

=== Turkey ===
All citizens will be automatically listed in the voters' list upon each election date. Domestic and overseas registers are composed in competence with data taken from the Address Registration System (AKS) of the General Directorate of Civil Registration and Nationality. Citizens may control whether they are registered in domestic or overseas electoral registers by visiting the website of the Supreme Election Council or the e-Government.

=== United Kingdom ===
In the UK voter registration is compulsory, but the requirement to register is rarely enforced. The 2023 system of registration in the United Kingdom (UK), is known as rolling registration. Electors can register with a local authority at any time of the year. This replaced the twice-yearly census of electors, which often disenfranchised those who had moved during the interval between censuses.

Across the country, the registration of electors is still technically the responsibility of the head of household, a concept which some consider to be anachronistic in modern society. As of 2023, the system is controversial, as it is possible for one person to delete persons who live with them from the electoral roll. As of January 2012, mandatory individual registration, pursuant to the Political Parties and Elections Act 2009, was anticipated.

A feasibility study for electronic individual voter registration (IVR), based on the experience of other nations, was undertaken by EURIM (Information Society Alliance) in 2010. The final report was released in 2011. According to the House of Commons Hansard from 16 January 2012, the IVR initiative is yet to be implemented in the UK. There was discussion of data from Northern Ireland, where individual voter registration levels significantly decreased following the introduction of an IVR policy.

In an experiment in Northern Ireland using personal identifiers, such as National Insurance numbers and signatures, the number of registered electors fell by some ten thousand. It was also understood that the new process may have resulted in fictitious voters being dropped from rolls.

Registration is mandatory pursuant to section 23 of the Representation of the People (England and Wales) Regulations 2001 (No. 341) and violators are liable on summary conviction and face a maximum fine of £1,000. Voters must be on the electoral roll in order to vote in national or local elections. A fixed address is required in order for an individual to vote in an election. To provide for persons who are transient, if an individual lacking a fixed address wants to vote, they may register by filling in a 'Declaration of local connection' form. This establishes a connection to the area based on the last fixed address someone had, or the place where they spend a substantial amount of their time (e.g. a homeless shelter).

A voting card is sent to each registrant shortly before any elections. The individual does not need to take the card to the polling station, instead it serves to remind individuals of the details they had provided to the electoral register.

=== United States ===
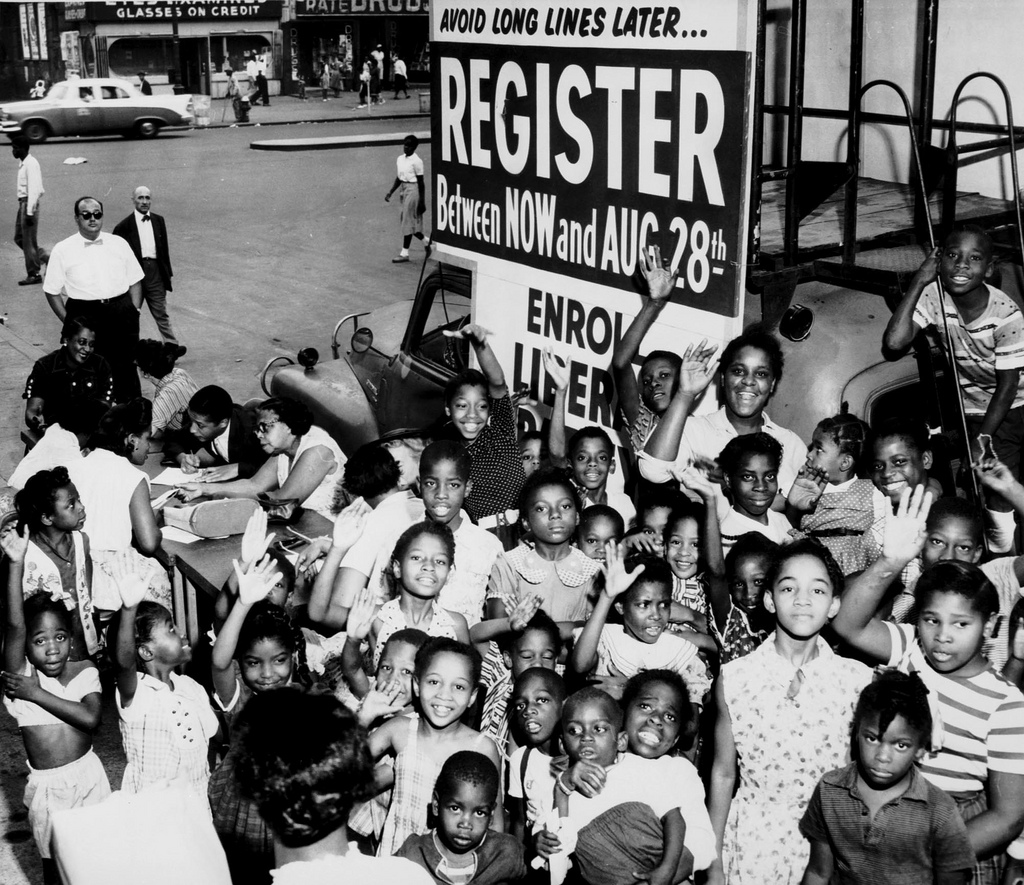
A group of African-American children gather around a sign and booth to register voters in the early 1960s.

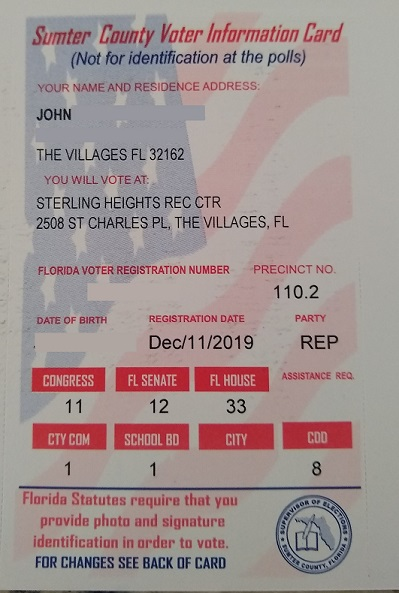
A Florida Sumter County Voter Information Card

In the United States, states generally require voter registration, with North Dakota being the only state which has no registration requirement. Some U.S. states do not require advance registration, instead allowing voters to register when they arrive at the polls, in what is called same day registration (SDR) or election day registration (EDR).

Same-day registration (SDR) has been linked to higher voter turn-out, with SDR states reporting average turn-out of 71% in the 2012 United States Presidential election, well above the average voter turn-out rate of 59% for non-SDR states.

Voter registration in the United States takes place at the county or municipality level, and is a prerequisite to voting at federal, state and local elections. The only exception is North Dakota, although North Dakota law allows cities to register voters for city elections.

A 2012 study by The Pew Charitable Trusts estimates that 24% of the voting-eligible population in the United States are not registered to vote, a percentage that represents "at least 51 million eligible U.S. citizens." Numerous states had a history of creating barriers to voter registration through a variety of fees, literacy or comprehension tests, and record-keeping requirements that in practice discriminated against racial or ethnic minorities, language minorities, and other groups. The Voting Rights Act of 1965 forbade such abuses and authorized federal oversight in jurisdictions of historic under-representation of certain groups. States continue to develop new practices that may discriminate against certain populations. By August 2016, federal rulings in five cases have overturned all or parts of voter registration or voter ID laws in Ohio, Texas, North Carolina, Wisconsin, and North Dakota that were found to place undue burden on minorities and other groups among voters. The states were required to offer alternatives for the November 2016 elections; many of these cases were expected to reach the US Supreme Court for additional hearings.

While voters traditionally had to register at government offices by a certain period before an election, in the mid-1990s, the federal government made efforts to simplify registration procedures to improve access and increase turnout. The National Voter Registration Act of 1993 (the "Motor Voter" law) required state governments to either provide uniform opt-in registration services through drivers' license registration centers, disability centers, schools, libraries, and mail-in registration, or to allow voter registration on Election Day, where voters can register at polling places immediately prior to voting.

Political parties and other organizations sometimes hold voter registration drives, organized efforts to register groups of new voters.

The U.S. Election Assistance Commission (EAC) as an independent, bipartisan commission offers to help election officials improve the administration of elections and help United States citizens participate in the voting process. The EAC is the official government agency that is a resource for voting registration questions.

== See also ==
- Biometric voter registration
- Voter ID laws
- Voter invitation card
- Voter registration drive
