= Alonso Alegría =

Peruvian playwright

- Born: July 14, 1940 (age 85); Santiago, Chile
- Occupation(s): Playwright, theatre director
- Notable work: Nubeluz

Alonso Alegría Amézquita (born July 14, 1940) is a Peruvian playwright and theatre director. The son of journalist Ciro Alegría, he is known for his work in Nubeluz.

== Early life ==
Alegría was born on July 14, 1940, in Santiago de Chile, where he remained for nine months. He and his brother Ciro were the children of Ciro Alegría and Rosalía Amézquita, only meeting his father in 1957 after he returned from his 23-year exile in Cuba with the return to democracy in Peru. He was educated at Markham College, later studying architecture at the National University of Engineering, but left to study theatre at Yale University with a Fulbright scholarship.

In 1990, he was hired to work on a new children's TV show for PANTEL, which became known as Nubeluz. Alegría formed a creative team that included the participation of a linguist (Clara Cavagnaro), a graphic designer (Fernando Gagliuffi) and two writers (Catalina Lohmann and Maritza Kirchhausen).

== Personal life ==
His son Gabriel is a musician of Afro-Peruvian jazz at New York University.

== Works ==
- El cruce sobre el Niágara. (1969, Casa de las Américas Prize)
- El terno blanco. (1981 in Potsdam)
- Daniela Frank. (1984 in Williamstown, 1993 edition in Lima)
- Encuentro con Fausto. (1999)
- Libertad! (2005 in Montpellier, opera libretto)
- Para morir bonito. (2009)
- Bolognesi en Arica. (2013)
- La lógica de Dios. (2013 in Rio de Janeiro)
- Cavando en la arena. (2022)
