= Electoral system of Peru =

The Peruvian electoral system has as its mission the planning, organization and execution of elections in Peru, as well as keeping a civil registry. As defined by the Constitution it comprises the following institutions:

- National Jury of Elections (JNE): in charge of overseeing the legality of elections
- National Office of Electoral Processes (ONPE): in charge of organizing elections
- National Registry of Identification and Civil Status (RENIEC): in charge of maintaining a civil registry, as well as record of suffrage eligibility and registration

Elections are held through direct universal suffrage, voting is compulsory for citizens age eighteen through seventy. Members of the Armed Forces and the Police are entitled to vote, but can not be elected.
