= Nubeluz =

Peruvian children's television series

- Genre: Entertainment
- Directed by: Cusi Barrio
- Presented by: Mónica Santa María; Almendra Gomelsky; Xiomara Xibillé; Lilianne Kubiliun; Karina Calmet; Scarlet Ortiz; Gaby Espino; Concetta Lo Dolce
- Theme music composer: Jorge "Coco" Tafur
- Opening theme: "Nubeluz (Sube a mi nube)"
- Ending theme: "Que siga la fiesta"
- Country of origin: Peru
- Original language: Spanish
- No. of seasons: 6

Production
- Producers: Rochi Hernández (1990–1991); Luis Carrizales Stoll (1991–1996)
- Running time: 4 hours (weekends)

Original release
- Network: Panamericana Televisión
- Release: September 4, 1990 – November 7, 1996

Related
- El show de July (1989–1990); Sube a mi nube (2024)

Nubeluz (Spanish pronunciation: [nuβeˈlus]) is a Peruvian children's show produced by Panamericana Televisión that aired from September 8, 1990 to November 7. 1996. It aired in a total of 19 Latin American countries, (Note: Including Argentina, Bolivia, Chile, Colombia, Costa Rica, Ecuador, El Salvador, Dominican Republic, Guatemala, Honduras, Nicaragua, Panama, Paraguay, Peru, Puerto Rico, Uruguay, Venezuela) as well as the United States, Turkey, the Philippines, Egypt, Japan, Indonesia and China. It was produced by Rochi Hernández and written by Alonso Alegría, Maritza Kirchhausen, Catalina Lohmann, Clara María Cavagnaro and Fernando Gagliuffi, and was hosted by a group of female presenters called Dalinas, the best known being Mónica Santa María and Almendra Gomelsky.

== History ==
The show succeeded El show de July, another children's show hosted by Yuly Maiocchi based on the Brazilian Xou da Xuxa that aired from 1989 to 1990. After its cancellation, a replacement was sought by the station, who contacted Peruvian playwright Alonso Alegría due to his experience in the field. Alegría formed a creative team that included the participation of a linguist (Clara Cavagnaro), a graphic designer (Fernando Gagliuffi) and two writers (Catalina Lohmann and Maritza Kirchhausen).

The show first aired on September 8 of the same year, with its stage located at the Coliseo Amauta, the largest in Latin America at the time with a capacity of 5,000 people, and hosted by models Mónica Santa María and Almendra Gomelsky, who was brought on by Santa María. The show was watched by 8 million people. Its main contribution to the genre was the creation of an alternative world made of 'nube' (cloud) and 'luz' (light), with its own language, called 'glúfico', (Note: The fictional language formed a major part of the show's vocabulary. Expressions commonly used included: Cíndela(s): female companions of the dalinas.; Dalina: the female presenters and a portmanteau of dama linda (pretty lady).; Dicolin(es): children who accompanied the dalinas.; Flonde: a milkshake.; Flópico: slippery; Glufo: inhabitants of Nubeluz.; Gólmodi(s): male companions of the dalinas.; ¡Grántico, pálmani, zum!: equivalent of "ready, set, go"; Kosito(s): people from the set; Lúndrico: wonderful, shocking; Monico(s): cartoons; Nubecino(s): children participating in the show; Nubelina: dalinas based in other countries; Nubetor(es): children watching the show; Ruckie/Ruki: a shaved ice dessert served in a cone; Sófico/Tópico: advertisements, from sofía; Tati(ve)s: years (age)) and its own peculiar manners and customs, where two weekly fiestas (replacing the terms "programme" or "show") were held.

Nubeluz featured several competitions between children (and even adults on occasion) divided into two coloured teams, always red and yellow, plus songs and dances, some with overt messages, performed by the Dalinas, interspersed with cartoons. The back-up dancers had nicknames of their own: Cíndelas for women, and Gólmodis for men, being paid US$800 each and starting careers after the show ended. (Note: Twin sisters Anabel and Antuane Elías (1990–1994) later hosted De colores and El club de las gemelas, while Anna Carina and María Pía Copello went on to work in María Pia & Timoteo. Additional cast members included Elvira Villa (1991–1996), Noelia Cogorno, Claudia and Franco Nagaro, Marco Zunino, María Pía Ureta, Daniela Sarfati, Rossana Fernández-Maldonado, Martín del Pomar and Cristian Rivero.) The competition was also set to its own musical score, played in the background exclusively while competition was in progress. This musical score included an acoustic, instrumental remix of the song "Rock This Town" by the Stray Cats.

During the competitions, the Gólmodis were in charge of assisting and spotting the competitors. However, the Gólmodis were also in control of the swinging demolition pads during one of the competition's toughest events, "Glufiadores". The Cíndelas were in charge of handing out the prizes at the end of each event, as well as wrapping towels around the competitors at the end of events that involved getting wet.

Numerous well-known singing groups, as well as other noted personalities, most of them well known in Latin America, made special guest appearances on the show at various times during its run. They performed their own songs or showed off their own talents. They frequently even experienced the show's competition first-hand during their guest appearance.

The show enjoyed great success and was soon broadcast in many Latin American countries. Moreover, it began to be broadcast to other countries, such as China, Turkey, Egypt, The Philippines, and the United States among others. A magazine, PLAK, was the show's official publication. Nubeluz was originally created for broadcast in Spanish and in Peru. In the mid-1990s an English-language pilot appeared, starring Monica Potter as the first American Dalina. The 1995 season also featured a character called Glufo, much like the American Barney the Dinosaur, who was large with rainbow colored fur, a loud distorted voice, and ears that wiggled. During its final two seasons, Nubeluz was relocated to Venezuela.

The 1994 suicide of one of the main hostesses, Mónica Santa María, was a turning point that led to the programme's decline in popularity. The show finally ended in 1996. However, it was rebroadcast in other countries such as Venezuela with a different cast.

A pilot for a new version of the show was shot in March 2008 in Peru, with Patty Wong, Tracy Freundt, Brenda Carvalho and Katherine Jiménez as the new Dalinas.

A number of live shows commemorating the show have taken place, starting in 2010, when Gomelsky and Braun starred in ¡Grántico, Pálmani, Zum!, commemorating its 20th anniversary. Six years later, another anniversary show took place at the amphitheatre of the Park of the Exhibition, also featuring Xibillé. A final show, Nubeluz, la despedida, took place at the Estadio Universidad San Marcos on July 20, 2024, featuring the show's entire cast. A second show was announced for November 3, to take place at the Teatro Caupolicán in Santiago de Chile.

In 2024, Sube a mi nube, a fictionalised biopic of Santa María's career in the show, was released. It was directed by Sergio Barrio, the son of Nubeluz producer Cusi Barrio.

== Cast ==
=== Dalinas ===
- Mónica Santa María (1990–94)
- Almendra Gomelsky (1990–95)
- Lilianne Kubiliun (1992–94)
- Xiomara Xibillé (1993–95)
- Karina Calmet (1995)
- Scarlet Ortiz (1995–96)
- Gaby Espino (1995–96)
- Concetta Lo Dolce (1995–96)

=== Nubelinas ===
- Xiomara Xibillé (1993)
- Daniela Sarfati (1994)
- María Pía Ureta (1994–96)

=== Cíndelas ===
- Anabel Elías (1990-1994)
- Antuané Elías (1990-1994)
- Johanna Strauss (1990-1991)
- Vanessa Viale Mongrut (1990-1992)
- Brenda Natters (1990-1991)
- Cinzia Canale (1990-1992)
- Noelia Cogorno (1990-1995)
- Linda Toledo (1990-1991)
- Darlene Bernaola (1990-1991)
- Carol Bernaola (1990-1991)
- María Pía Ureta (1991-1994)
- Elvira Villa (1991-1995)
- Claudia Nagaro (1992-1995)
- Rossana Fernández-Maldonado (1992-1995)
- Daniela Sarfati (1993-1994)
- María Pía Copello (1993-1994)
- Anna Carina Copello (1994-1995)
- Mitzy Silva (1994-1995)
- Pierina Cogorno (1994-1995)
- Valeria Leigh Wensjoe (1994-1995)
- Alessandra Gaidolfi (1994-1995)
- Mariella Cafferata (1995)

=== Dicolines ===
- Ángela Carrillo (1991-1994)
- Rudy Ocaña (1991)
- Paola León Prado (1991)
- Enrique Deschiave (1991-1992)
- Sandra Sánchez (1991)
- Daniel Vélez (1991)
- Javier Mendoza (1991)
- Tahisa Suárez (1991-1992)
- Jesús Tanguis (1992-1994)
- Felipe Berckemeyer (1992-1994)
- Israel Gomelsky (1992)
- Alice Raschio (1992-1994)
- Anna Carina Copello (1991-1994)
- Lilita de la Fuente (1993-1995)
- Cinthia Iparraguirre (1993-1995)
- Alfredo Pérsico (1993)
- Daniel Sacovertiz (1993)
- Rodrigo Siles (1993)
- Lilian Pozo (1995)
