= María Pía Copello =

Peruvian television presenter, actress and producer

- Born: María Pía Copello Hora; 22 January 1977 (age 49); Lima, Peru
- Occupations: Television presenter; actress; singer; producer; influencer
- Spouse: Samuel Dyer Coriat (m. 2006)
- Children: 3

María Pía Copello Hora (born 22 January 1977) is a Peruvian television presenter, actress, singer, producer and influencer.

She achieved popularity for having been the host of the children's program María Pia & Timoteo on América Televisión along with actor Ricardo Bonilla, at the beginning and middle of the first decade of the 21st century. After stopping hosting children's programs, she joined other programs, such as Esto es guerra, Talento urbano and Versus de colegios.

== Early life ==
Copello is the daughter of Fernando Copello (of Italian descent) and Luisa Hora (of Japanese descent), she studied primary and secondary school at Newton School in Lima. Then, she entered the Peruvian University of Applied Sciences (UPC) to study advertising and marketing, she obtained a bachelor's degree.

== Career ==
In 1993, Copello debuted on television as "cíndela" in the children's program Nubeluz.

From 2000 to 2006, she hosted the children's program María Pía y Timoteo, on América Televisión, replacing Karina Rivera. At the same time, Copello directed her own dance school for children and adolescents, which included the collaboration of her younger sister, Anna Carina. In 2008, she decided to step away from children's animation for a moment to host the reality television program for teenagers Talentourbano, broadcast by Frecuencia Latina. During 2011, she returned to children's animation and hosted the television program children's 321 María Pía, broadcast by Panamericana Televisión.

Copello decided to move away from children's entertainment, from the end of 2012 and beginning of 2013, to give way to other projects in her career. She then began hosting the radio program Arriba los tacos, which is currently called Bienawatas on the Radio Corazón station. In 2015, she hosted the school competition program Versus, along with Yaco Eskenazi. Also that year, she began hosting the reality show Esto es guerra, alongside Mathías Brivio, replacing Johanna San Miguel. She remained on the program until the end of 2018. She returned to the program for short periods to briefly fill in or replace the hosts. She has also been presented as the director of the segment of the reality show La Academia, to later assume the leadership of said show again in 2022.

After the television show, Copello has a weekly program called #YaNoYa with more than one hundred and twenty videos on her YouTube channel, Pía Copello. She also presented her cookbook Los secretos de la cocina de Pía Copello, winner of the Family category at the Gourmand Awards.

== Personal life ==
On 14 January 2006, Copello married businessman Samuel Dyer Coriat, her boyfriend since 2001, with whom she has three children, born in 2007, 2010, and 2014.

== Filmography ==
=== Television ===
- Nubeluz (1993–1995)
- Lotería Kino (1996)
- Andrea, tiempo de amar (1997),
- Karina y Timoteo (August 1999-February 2000)
- El show del Chavo (August 1999-December 2000)
- Tele amor (1999 and 2000)
- María Pia & Timoteo/De la re (March 2000-December 2006)
- El show de la refurinfunflay (March 2001-December 2003)
- Talento urbano (2008)
- 321 María Pía (2011)
- Todos los bravos (2012)
- Yo Soy Kids (2014)
- Versus de colegios (2015)
- Esto es guerra (2015–2018)
- El origen de la lucha (2016)
- Mande quien mande (2023–present)

== Discography ==
- María Pía y Timoteo (2000, CD and cassette).
- María Pía y Timoteo. De la refurinfunflay (2004, CD)
- María Pía en una aventura cibernética (CD)
- 321 María Pía en el Bosque Encantado (2011, CD)
- Mujercitas (2017, CD)
- Blanca Navidad (2020, CD)
- ¡Que siga la fiesta! (2020, CD)
- Bailando sola (2021, CD)
