= Maria Pia =

Maria Pia may refer to:

== People ==
- Princess Maria Pia of Savoy (1847–1911), married to Luís I of Portugal
- Princess Maria Pia of Bourbon-Two Sicilies (1849–1882), married to Robert I, Duke of Parma
- Princess Maria Pia delle Grazie of Two Sicilies (1878–1973), married to Prince Luiz of Orléans-Braganza
- Princess Maria Pia of Bourbon-Parma (born 1934), married to Prince Alexander of Yugoslavia
- Princess Maria-Pia of Liechtenstein (born 1960), daughter of Prince Karl Alfred and Archduchess Agnes Christina of Austria
- Maria Pia of Saxe-Coburg and Braganza (1907-1995), claimed to be an illegitimate daughter of King Carlos I of Portugal
- María Pia Ayora (born 1962), Peruvian swimmer
- Maria-Pia Boëthius (born 1947), Swedish journalist, novelist, nonfiction writer and activist
- Maria Pia Calzone (born 1967), Italian actress
- Maria Pia Casilio (1935–2012), Italian actress
- Maria Pia Conte (born 1944), Italian former actress
- María Pía Copello (born 1977), host of the Peruvian television program Maria Pia & Timoteo
- Maria Pia De Vito (born 1960), Italian jazz singer, composer, and arranger
- Maria Pia Di Meo (born 1939), Italian actress
- Maria Pia D'Orlando (born 1934), Italian long distance runner
- Maria Pia Fanfani (born 1957), Italian photographer, writer and humanitarian worker
- Maria Pia Fanti (born 1957), Italian control theorist
- María Pía Fernández (born 1995), Uruguayan middle distance runner
- Maria Pia Fusco (1939–2016), Italian screenwriter
- Maria Pia Garavaglia (born 1947), Italian politician
- Maria-Pia Geppert (1907–1997), German mathematician
- Maria Pia Mastena (1881–1951), Italian religious sister and Blessed
- María Pia van Oordt, Peruvian sailor
- María Pía Shaw (born 1979), Argentine journalist
- Maria-Pia Victoria-Feser (born 1965), Swiss statistician

== Other uses ==
- Maria Pia Bridge, a railway bridge in Porto, Portugal
