= Ana María Picasso =

Peruvian journalist and TV host

Ana María Picasso Clarke (born 24 July 1984 in Lima) is a Peruvian journalist and TV host.

== Biography ==
Picasso is the daughter of Jorge Picasso Salinas and Ana Maria Clarke Larizbeascoa. She traveled to U.S. to study journalism at the University of Texas at Austin. Once she graduated from college, she got a job at Univision in Dallas to work as host of evening news, in addition to special reports on location. She worked for the chain just over a year.

Later, she moved to Mexico after winning a scholarship at the Center for Arts Education at Televisa, where she took courses of history of art, acting, diction, driving, dance and corporal work.

In 2006, Picasso returned to Lima, where the following year she began to work as host of the Central Deportiva show on Cable Magico Deportes, a Peruvian television sports channel. Picasso also debuted as an actress, after following theater classes with Bruno Odar, in the musical A pies, descalzos ¡vamos!.

Introduced in summer 2010 the program La costa, and then went to work to RPP Noticias channel, with two programs: Link and Anda y ve.

In 2012, she joined to Plus TV channel to present Oh! Diosas.
