= ¿Quién es la máscara? =

¿Quién es la máscara? (Spanish: Who Is the Mask?) may refer to the following versions of the King of Mask Singer program:

- ¿Quién es la máscara? (Mexican TV series), released in 2019
- ¿Quién es la máscara? (Chilean TV series), released in 2021
- ¿Quién es la máscara? (Colombian TV series), released in 2021
- ¿Quién es la máscara? (Uruguayan TV series), released in 2022
- ¿Quién es la máscara? (Argentine TV series), released in 2022
