= Caligula case =

1992 murder case in Peru

- Location: Cieneguilla, Lima, Peru
- Date: February 13, 1992
- Attack type: Murder
- Weapon: Firearm
- Deaths: 2
- Victims: Fernando de Romaña Azalde; Julio Domínguez Barsallo
- Accused: Alejandro Gonzales Ramírez

The Caligula case (Spanish: El caso Calígula) refers to the murder of Fernando "Calígula" de Romaña Azalde and Julio "Chato" Domínguez Barsallo, which occurred on February 13, 1992. Both men were used-car salesmen from Miraflores and were found dead in two different districts of Lima, Peru. The former was found dead on the side of the road connecting Cieneguilla and Huarochirí, while the latter was found in his car near a clinic in Monterrico, an upscale area of the city. Both had been fatally shot in the head.

The unusual nature of the crime quickly evolved into a scandal that uncovered the existence of the "Calígula Clan", (Note: Spanish: Clan Calígula; Also known as the "Pitucos de Miraflores".) a criminal enterprise named after its leader, dedicated to drug trafficking, theft, and the blackmailing of several local upper-class figures, some of whom were well known at the time. The alias "Vengeful Angel" (Ángel vengador) was given by the media to Alejandro "Jano" Gonzales Ramírez, who was initially accused of being the perpetrator, but was ultimately never positively identified as such.

The media coverage surrounding the trial, noteworthy for being on par with that of the ongoing period of armed violence, inspired a TV series produced by Frecuencia Latina and is also part of the country's contemporary popular culture.

== Events ==
On February 13, Romaña and Domínguez left the former's home in Miraflores in a silver Toyota with the license plate number LQ-3023. According to Romaña's brother, Jorge, this took place at 4:30 pm. Minutes later, the car was stopped by unknown assailants, who took them to a curve at kilometre 17 of the highway connecting Cieneguilla with Huarochirí province, where they were killed. At 7:00 p.m., Romaña's body was found on the side of the road, while Domínguez was found next to the Toyota, which was parked at the first block of Las Pecanas—a street in Monterrico—near the Clínica Montefiori, a private clinic in La Molina District.

According to the National Police of Peru, the assailants had trailed and stopped the vehicle, taking both victims to the aforementioned location distant from the city's urban centre, where they were shot. A search of Romaña's body, found next to two pools of blood and six .38 caliber shells, revealed that he was carrying 400 dollars, his electoral notebook, a wristwatch, and a chain necklace. Romaña had been shot in the right ear, the head, and the left side of the maxilla. Domínguez was shot in the left orbital region.

The day after the killings, two notebooks and a number of videotapes were stolen from Romaña's house. By March 1, the criminal enterprise had been uncovered, with Calígula—as he was now known—being described by the media as a "playboy" who blackmailed young girls by recording them having sex, including in orgies organised by the "clan," after which the recordings were sent to their parents. Other members of the group were identified, including Luis Augusto "Loco" Mannarelli Rachitoff, Carlos Edmundo Gonzales Ciccia, José Luis Mendoza Torres, Alejandro "Jano" Gonzales Ramírez and Horacio Puccio Ballona.

By mid-to-late March, the nickname "Vengeful Angel" (Ángel vengador) had been widely spread by the media to refer to the killer.

== Victims ==
Fernando de Romaña Azalde (born c. 1968), nicknamed Calígula, was a local of Miraflores, an upper-class district of Lima. He had been previously investigated in December 1990 in connection to a vehicle theft operation. Several media outlets reported that a S/. 12.000 bribe, whose origin was unknown, had been paid to expunge his criminal record, after which the officers involved were sanctioned and dismissed. In October 1991, a house at 561 Diez Canseco, in San Antonio (a neighbourhood of Miraflores), was searched by DIRCOTE agents in connection to a similar operation. The house belonged to Romaña's family, and his nickname was published by local news outlets. The investigation concluded after authorities claimed the search was improper and the detectives involved were sanctioned.

Julio Domínguez Barsallo (born c. 1972), nicknamed Chato, was also a local of Miraflores and a friend of Romaña. Both were working as used car salesmen at the time of the murder.

== Investigation and trial ==
=== Possible motives ===
Due to the nature of Romaña's criminal enterprise, the police first suspected that an unidentified Italian man, whose daughter had been filmed, had accepted the group's bribe, killing the men instead of paying them. Other hypotheses laid the blame on a member of the military or claimed that Domínguez was the target due to him maintaining a relationship with a married woman. At the time of their death, both men had made a number of enemies, having themselves been extorted by members of the police force. Despite Romaña's job as a car salesman, he had never actually made a sale. Three days before the killings, Romaña had been seen arguing with Gregorio Villalobos Quispitupa, an officer close to the group, who also entered the house several times using a key.

=== Arrests ===
The police issued a search warrant for Luis Augusto Mannarelli Rachitoff on March 8 after identifying him as a member of the group, responsible for filming the material that would be later used as blackmail. On August 26, Carlos Edmundo Gonzales Ciccia (38) was captured following the robbery of US$900.000 worth of jewels belonging to María Teresa de Santos (née Normand), a resident of San Isidro, which had taken place on June 24, 1991. Gonzales was then identified by Nancy Gómez Magallanes, the housemaid, and claimed to police that he had not acted alone, naming Mannarelli as a participant. On April 25, 1993, he was captured while attempting to depart from Iquitos to Brazil using a counterfeit Argentine passport. Three days later, a family member claimed that his life would be in danger if imprisoned, due to "something big" that would be "impossible to reveal." His lawyer argued that was attempting to escape the victims' killers, since two attempts on his life had already been made in the past. He was nevertheless prosecuted for the robbery and the death of Manuela Barreto Vargas, his girlfriend at the time, who was killed in an accident at the Costa Verde Highway in August 1991, being absolved of the latter.

On November 1, 1993, group member Alejandro Gonzales Ramírez was captured in Miraflores, being identified by Romaña's sister as the person who stole items from the house the day following the murders. He was formally charged by the Judiciary of Peru with being the author of the homicide four days later. His capture was followed by a number of testimonies of people involved in the parties organised by the group, including actress Mónica Santa María, comedian Raúl Beryón, and then-vedette Susy Díaz.

On November 30, Horacio Puccio Ballona was arrested while leaving his house in Miraflores, after which he identified Gonzales as the perpetrator, claiming that the killings were ordered by a diplomat of a neighbouring country due to both victims having stolen US$15.000 worth of drugs. Puccio, who had been the last person to see Romaña alive, was found in possession of illicit drugs and a .38 Smith & Wesson revolver, believed to be the murder weapon.

=== Trial ===
The legal process took place over a period of several months. Mannarelli, Gonzales and Mendoza were prosecuted and sentenced for the 1991 robbery, for which Mannarelli and Mendoza were sentenced to 8 years. The homicide case against Gonzales was dismissed in 1995 due to a lack of proof. Mannarelli was imprisoned at a penitentiary in San Juan de Lurigancho, where he later trained boxer Mario Broncano.

== Aftermath ==
Puccio was released shortly after his arrest and interrogation. He died in 1999 while working as a mule after one of the 229 drug capsules he was smuggling ruptured inside his stomach. Mannarelli continued carrying out illicit activities, being later imprisoned in Juliaca. Jano, also imprisoned, being stabbed to death at his house in Los Pulpos beach in 2021, possibly to settle a score.

In 2006, Liliana Castro Mannarelli was identified as the mastermind of the killing of businesswoman Myriam Fefer, another highly publicised trial. At the time, Castro had been romantically involved with Fefer's daughter, Eva Bracamonte. Manarelli, her uncle, had been the one to introduce her to Alejandro "Payaso" Trujillo Ospina, the Colombian hitman who carried out the crime at Fefer's house at 219 Paul Harris, a street in San Isidro.

In 2007, it was reported that the case file, located at the archives of the Judiciary, was missing.

The case inspired El ángel vengador: Calígula, a miniseries directed by Luis Llosa and starring Julián Legaspi that aired on Frecuencia Latina from 1993 to 1994.

== See also ==
- Luis Banchero Rossi, another highly publicised murder case
