= Xiomara Xibillé =

Colombian TV hostess and singer

Xiomy Xibillé
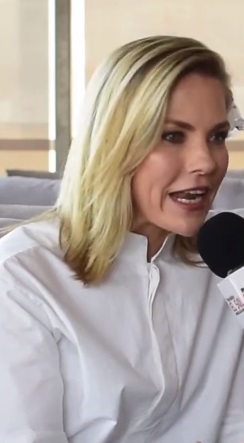
- Born: 18 January 1973; Medellín, Colombia
- Other names: Xiomy; Dalina dulce
- Education: Pontificia Universidad Javeriana; University of Los Andes; Brahma Kumaris
- Occupations: TV presenter, actress, singer
- Years active: 1976–present

Xiomara Xibillé Aristizábal (born January 18, 1973), also known as Xiomy Xibillé or simply as Xiomy, is a Colombian television presenter, actress and singer. She is best known for her work in Nubeluz, joining the show in 1993 as a presenter, receiving the nickname Dalina dulce.

== Early life ==
Xibillé was born in Medellín in 1973 to Jaime Xibillé, the son of Spanish immigrants, and Blanca Aristizábal. She is of Spanish and German descent, while her paternal grandfather was Catalan.

== Career ==
When she was three years old, she was a model child for a Coltejer commercial in 1976. She then studied ballet and theatre. At the age of seventeen, she was the winner of the Chica Palmolive modelling contest in 1990. She performed for the first time in the children's shows Blue Jeans and Imagínate, by Producciones PUNCH. A year later, in 1991, she was chosen as the host of a children's program called Todo el mundo está feliz, a Colombian version of Xou da Xuxa.

Her participation in the aforementioned show caused the producers of PANTEL to cast her as a nubelina, a presenter of the local Nubeluz segment. Her performance was so outstanding that in 1993 she became a dalina, a host of the main show in Lima, Peru, alongside Almendra Gomelsky, Mónica Santa María and Lilianne Braun, remaining in Nubeluz until 1995. The suicide of Santa María was a point of inflection for her, having had dinner with her and her boyfriend prior to her death.

During her time in Nubeluz, a miscommunication incident almost caused Xibillé and Gomelsky to get taken off the air during a radio interview with Héctor Larrea, as the words used by Xibillé, despite having a benign meaning in Colombia, were offensive in Argentina.

In 1998, she travelled to Ecuador hired by the Ecuavisa channel, which, taking advantage of her fame in the country after Nubeluz, created a show for her called Xiomy. She later starred in Caracol Televisión's Alejo, la búsqueda del amor in 2000, and hosted Citytv's ABC del bebé afterwards. She joined the cast of 3 milagros in 2011.

In 2012, Xibillé opened Vivir Bonito, a vegetarian restaurant in Usaquén, located northwest of Bogotá.

In 2016, she participated in an anniversary show of Nubeluz that took place at the amphitheatre of the Park of the Exhibition in Lima, also featuring fellow co-stars Braun and Gomelsky. A final show, Nubeluz, la despedida, was announced in 2024 and took place at the Estadio Universidad San Marcos on 20 July of the same year, featuring the show's entire cast.

== Personal life ==
Xibillé married Jorge Enrique Bermúdez on 7 December 1997, and divorced him in 2011, having had two daughters with him: Luna and Monserrat. She is currently married to Roberto Cuéllar, also of German descent, with whom she had a third daughter, Guadalupe.

In 2024, she revealed that she had suffered a severe cycling accident two days prior to Christmas of 2023.

== Filmography ==
Year	Title	Role	Notes
1990	Imagínate		PUNCH production.
1990	Blue jeans		PUNCH production.
1991–1993	Todo el mundo está feliz		PUNCH production and Colombian version of Xou da Xuxa
1993–1995	Nubeluz	Dalina	Presenter; Peruvian show produced by PANTEL.
1998	Xiomy	Presenter	Ecuadorian show produced by Ecuavisa.
2000	Alejo, la búsqueda del amor	Fidelina	Caracol Televisión production.
2006–2011	ABC del bebé	Presenter	Citytv production.
2008	Aquí no hay quien viva	Elkam	RCN Televisión production.
2011	3 milagros	María Patricia Botero de Fontanarrosa	RCN Televisión production.
2011	Ama tu casa de día TV	Presenter	Claro TV production.
2015–2016	Mujeres	Presenter	Canal 1 production.
2021	¿Quién es la máscara?	Herself	Contestant; RCN Televisión production.
2022	Enfermeras	Herself	RCN Televisión production.
