= Almendra Gomelsky =

Argentine model and TV hostess

- Born: December 17, 1968 (age 57)
- Other names: Dalina grande
- Citizenship: Argentine, Peruvian
- Occupations: Television presenter, model, singer
- Known for: Nubeluz
- Spouse(s): Marcelo Serrano (divorced) Tito Awe (m. 2004)
- Children: 2
- Modeling information
- Height: 175 cm (5 ft 9 in)
- Hair color: Brown
- Eye color: Brown

Paola Almendra Gomelsky Duarte (born December 17, 1968) is an Argentine naturalised Peruvian television presenter, model and designer based in Lima. She is best known for being one of the two original presenters of Nubeluz, a popular Peruvian children's TV show during the first half of the 1990s, for which she was also known as the Dalina grande.

== Early life ==
Gomelsky was born in Quilmes on December 17, 1968, to parents Luis Ignacio Gomelsky (died 2020) and Margarita Elisa Duarte (died 2004). She has four siblings: Gabriel, Israel, Laura and Daniel. Due to the fact that her unusual name was not allowed at the time, she did not have a legal name for the first three months of her life until another name was added as per the judge's request. She is of Jewish descent on her father's side.

She lived in Argentina until 1982, when her father—a textile engineer and business consultant—moved the family to Peru after an inconvenience with one of his companies in the country changed his plans to move to Israel as he had originally planned. Two of the family's children remained in the country, already married by then. Due to the armed conflict in the country, her parents briefly returned to Argentina, but returned soon after.

== Career ==
Gomelsky started her modelling career in Peru, after an Argentine presenter told her mother that she had the looks to start working in the industry. Her mother, a redhead, had once been a model for L'Oréal, and reluctantly started accompanying her to auditions at casting agencies.

In 1990, she auditioned for a children's TV programme at PANTEL after already rejecting three casting calls at the insistence of her friend and fellow Yanbal model, Mónica Santa María, who had already been accepted. Due to her insecurities regarding her appearance, she arrived wearing casual clothing and no makeup to not be accepted. After reading La Cucarachita Martina, a children's book, and singing a Xuxa song, she was sent to an office to sign a contract for the show, which became known as Nubeluz. One of the show's two original presenters, she was nicknamed the Dalina grande.

On March 13, 1994, Santa María, who had been struggling with depression, committed suicide after an argument with her boyfriend, Constantino Heredia. In a 2024 interview with Verónica Linares, Gomelsky recalled that Santa María called her phone in Miami the night prior to her death about her sadness over another argument with Heredia. Gomelsky suggested that she fly to the US, where she could relax and go shopping with her and co-star Lilianne Braun, with whom she was vacationing. Santa María agreed and bought the plane tickets. After becoming aware of her suicide, they immediately returned to Peru through an 11 a.m. flight, arriving at 3 p.m. and attending the wake at the Virgen de Fátima Church in Miraflores and the funeral in La Molina. Gomelsky was tasked with the announcement of her death in Nubeluz, and remained on the show until March 1995, when a spin-off series, Almendra, began with her as the presenter, airing until October 1997.

In 2001, she returned to Peruvian television to star in Red Global's Algo en común. In 2006, she opened a beauty salon.

In 2010, Gomelsky and Braun starred in ¡Grántico, Pálmani, Zum!, a live show commemorating the 20th anniversary of Nubeluz. Six years later, another anniversary show took place at the amphitheatre of the Park of the Exhibition, also featuring fellow co-star Xiomara Xibillé. A final show, Nubeluz, la despedida, was announced in 2024 and took place at the Estadio Universidad San Marcos on July 20 of the same year, featuring the show's entire cast.

== Personal life ==
Gomelsky has remained in regular contact with Santa María's family after her death in 1994, who have continued to grant the rights of Mónica's image for Nubeluz's anniversary shows.

Her first marriage was to the Spaniard Marcelo Serrano, which lasted for seven years until their amicable divorce. After her divorce, she dated Tito Awe for eight years until the couple's marriage on June 5, 2004. The couple has two children: Macarena and Rodrigo, having suffered a miscarriage prior to her daughter's birth.

In August 2022 she was the subject of a minor controversy after complaining on her Instagram page about the two-hour wait caused by the check-in procedures for foreign arrivals at Jorge Chávez International Airport, which led to calls for her to leave the country despite being a naturalised citizen.

She announced that she was cancer-free in 2024 after having had treatment for a carcinoma on her lip. The same year, she was involved in another controversy involving her show Mujeres de la PM when a guest recommended the misuse of a consecrated host for an esoteric love ritual, which led to Archbishop Carlos Castillo Mattasoglio denouncing the programme while an official apology was made soon after.

== Filmography ==
=== Film ===
Year	Title	Role	Notes
2016	Buscando a Guerrero	Dalina	

=== Television ===
Year	Title	Role	Notes
1990–1995	Nubeluz	Dalina	Presenter
1995–1997	Almendra	Host	
1999	Hubo una vez	Presenter	Televisión Nacional del Perú production.
1999–2000	Sueños	Alicia	Telenovela.
2001	Algo en común	Presenter	
2003–2011	¡Oh diosas!	Presenter	
2012	Casi perfectas	Presenter	
2012–2013	Perú tiene talento	Judge	Peruvian spin-off of Got Talent
2013	En busca de la nueva diva Perú	Presenter	
2014	La voz Kids	Judge	Children's spin-off of La Voz Perú
2017–2019	Mujeres sin filtro	Presenter	
2020	La máscara	Presenter	
2021–2022	Hecho a mano	Presenter	
2023–present	Mujeres de la PM	Presenter	

=== Theatre ===
Year	Title	Role	Notes
2010	¡Grántico, Pálmani, Zum!	Dalina	Nubeluz 20th anniversary live show
2016	Nubeluz 25 años	Dalina	Nubeluz 25th anniversary live show
2024	Nubeluz, la despedida	Dalina	Nubeluz commemorative live show
