= ¿Quién es la máscara? (Colombian TV series) =

Colombian reality talent TV series

- Genre: Reality
- Created by: Seo Chang-man
- Based on: King of Mask Singer by Munhwa Broadcasting Corporation
- Presented by: Piter Albeiro
- Judges: Llane; Lina Tejeiro; Alejandra Azcárate; Juanda Caribe
- Country of origin: Colombia
- Original language: Spanish
- No. of seasons: 1
- No. of episodes: 42

Production
- Production companies: Alibi Films; Endemol Shine Group

Original release
- Network: Canal RCN
- Release: 9 October 2021 – 23 January 2022

Related
- King of Mask Singer

¿Quién es la máscara? (Spanish: Who Is the Mask?) is a Colombian reality singing competition television series that premiered on Canal RCN on 9 October 2021. It is based on the South Korean television show King of Mask Singer created by Seo Chang-man.

On 23 January 2022, Zorro (actor and singer Juan Sebastián Quintero) was declared the winner of the first season, and Coco Loco (actor and singer Karoll Márquez) the runner-up.

== Format ==
A group of celebrities hide behind a character while a panel will have to guess who is under the mask. The competitors face-off and perform a song of their choice. The studio audience votes for their favorite performance and the winner is safe for the week, while the performer with the fewest votes is nominated for elimination. The panelists then decide which of the nominated performer is eliminated, the eliminated performer must then reveal their identity.

== Panelists and host ==
The panelists consist of singer Llane, actress Lina Tejeiro, television personality Alejandra Azcárate, and comedian Juanda Caribe. The show is hosted by Piter Albeiro.

== Contestants ==
=== Part 1 ===
Results
Stage name	Celebrity	Occupation	Episodes																
Stage name	Celebrity	Occupation	1	2	3	4	5	6	7	8	9	10	11	12	13	14	15	16	42
Zorro	Juan Sebastián Quintero	Actor and singer	WIN					WIN			WIN	WIN			WIN	WIN	WIN	WIN	WINNER
Mono Tití	Beto Villa	Singer and actor				WIN	WIN			WIN			WIN		RISK	WIN	RISK	OUT	
Palenquera	Natalia Bedoya	Actress and singer	RISK				RISK				RISK		RISK	RISK		RISK	OUT		
Gallinazo	Sebastián Villalobos	YouTuber		WIN					WIN	RISK		RISK		WIN		OUT			
Cacatúa	Alicia Machado	Miss Universe 1996			RISK			RISK		RISK		RISK		OUT					
Gato	Rafaella Chávez	Actress and singer		WIN			RISK			WIN			OUT						
Esmeralda	Aida Victoria Merlano	Influencer				RISK			RISK		OUT								
Lechón	Checo Acosta	Singer			WIN				OUT										
Armadillo	Alejandro Martínez	Actor		RISK				OUT											
Pantera	Jorge Cárdenas	Actor				OUT													
Lechuza	Xiomara Xibillé	TV personality			OUT														
Mariposa	Claudia Bahamón	TV host		OUT															
Camaleón	Nairo Quintana	Cyclist	OUT																

=== Part 2 ===
Results
Stage name	Celebrity	Occupation	Episodes																									
Stage name	Celebrity	Occupation	17	18	19	20	21	22	23	24	25	26	27	28	29	30	31	32	33	34	35	36	37	38	39	40	41	42
Coco Loco	Karoll Márquez	Actor and singer	WIN					WIN					WIN		WIN			WIN		WIN		WIN		WIN		WIN	WIN	RUNNER-UP
Muñeca	Carolina Sabino	Actress and singer				WIN		RISK				WIN			RISK			RISK		RISK		RISK			WIN	RISK	OUT	
Colibrí	María Laura Quintero	Actress and model		WIN						WIN		RISK				RISK		RISK			WIN		RISK		RISK	OUT		
Burro	Lucas Arnau	Singer					WIN			WIN		RISK					RISK		WIN	RISK			WIN	OUT				
Caimán	Mario Duarte	Actor and singer			WIN				RISK				RISK			WIN			RISK		RISK	OUT						
Monstruo	Iván Marín	Comedian		RISK					WIN			WIN			RISK			WIN			OUT							
Panda	Mr. Black	Singer				WIN					WIN			WIN					OUT									
Orquídea	María Conchita Alonso	Singer					RISK				RISK			WIN			OUT											
Conejo	Marilyn Patiño	Actress	RISK						RISK					RISK		OUT												
Rin Rín	Agmeth Escaf	Actor/TV host			RISK					RISK				OUT														
Tarántula	Johanna Fadul	Actress				RISK					RISK		OUT															
Toro	Daniel Calderón	Singer				RISK				OUT																		
Pez	Shaira	Singer		RISK				OUT																				
Azulejo	Mabel Moreno	Actress					OUT																					
Madremonte	Elianis Garrido	Actress and model			OUT																							
Dorado	Faustino Asprilla	Former footballer	OUT																									

The masked singer won their face-off and remained in the competition.
The masked singer lost their face-off, but was not eliminated.
The masked singer was eliminated from the competition.
The masked singer did not perform.

== Episodes ==
=== Week 1 (9 and 10 October) ===
Performances on the first episode
#	Stage name	Song	Identity	Result
1	Zorro	"Suavemente" by Elvis Crespo	undisclosed	WIN
2	Camaleón	"Ritmo" by Black Eyed Peas and J Balvin	Nairo Quintana	OUT
3	Palenquera	"Desde Esa Noche" by Thalía feat. Maluma	undisclosed	RISK

Performances on the second episode
#	Stage name	Song	Identity	Result
1	Mariposa	"Destino" by Greeicy and Nacho	Claudia Bahamón	OUT
2	Gato	"Tan Enamorados" by Ricardo Montaner	undisclosed	WIN
3	Armadillo	"Atrévete-te-te" by Calle 13	undisclosed	RISK
4	Gallinazo	"Por un Beso de Tu Boca" by Silvestre Dangond	undisclosed	WIN

=== Week 2 (16 and 17 October) ===
Performances on the third episode
#	Stage name	Song	Identity	Result
1	Lechuza	"El Anillo" by Jennifer Lopez	Xiomara Xibille	OUT
2	Lechón	"La Bilirrubina" by Juan Luis Guerra	undisclosed	WIN
3	Cacatúa	"Es Mentiroso" by Olga Tañón	undisclosed	RISK

Performances on the fourth episode
#	Stage name	Song	Identity	Result
1	Mono Tití	"La quiero a morir" by Francis Cabrel	undisclosed	WIN
2	Esmeralda	"Tusa" by Karol G and Nicki Minaj	undisclosed	RISK
3	Pantera	"Travesuras" by Nicky Jam	Jorge Cárdenas	OUT

=== Week 3 (23 and 24 October) ===
Performances on the fifth episode
#	Stage name	Song	Identity	Result
1	Mono Tití	"Andas en Mi Cabeza" by Chino & Nacho feat. Daddy Yankee	undisclosed	WIN
2	Gato	"Mayores" by Becky G and Bad Bunny	undisclosed	RISK
3	Palenquera	"La Vecina" by Cristina Maica	undisclosed	RISK

Performances on the sixth episode
#	Stage name	Song	Identity	Result
1	Cacatua	"Piel morena" by Thalía	undisclosed	RISK
2	Zorro	"La Camisa Negra" by Juanes	undisclosed	WIN
3	Armadillo	"Ginza" by J Balvin	Alejandro Martínez	OUT

=== Week 4 (30 and 31 October) ===
Performances on the seventh episode
#	Stage name	Song	Identity	Result
1	Lechón	"Tutu" by Camilo and Pedro Capó	Checo Acosta	OUT
2	Esmeralda	"Rata de Dos Patas" by Paquita la del Barrio	undisclosed	RISK
3	Gallinazo	"Detente" by Mike Bahía and Danny Ocean	undisclosed	WIN

Performances on the eighth episode
#	Stage name	Song	Identity	Result
1	Cacatúa	"Propuesta Indecente" by Romeo Santos	undisclosed	RISK
2	Gato	"Mala Hierba" by Alejandra Guzmán	undisclosed	WIN
3	Gallinazo	"La Mordidita" by Ricky Martin feat. Yotuel	undisclosed	RISK
4	Mono Tití	"He Bebido" by Espinoza Paz	undisclosed	WIN

=== Week 5 (6 and 7 November) ===
Performances on the ninth episode
#	Stage name	Song	Identity	Result
1	Palenquera	"Cuán lejos voy" from Moana	undisclosed	RISK
2	Zorro	"Con Calma" by Daddy Yankee feat. Snow	undisclosed	WIN
3	Esmeralda	"Soy Yo" by Bomba Estéreo	Aida Victoria Merlano	OUT

Performances on the tenth episode
#	Stage name	Song	Identity	Result
1	Cacatúa	"¿A quién le importa?" by Thalía	undisclosed	RISK
2	Zorro	"El Rey" by José Alfredo Jiménez	undisclosed	WIN
3	Gallinazo	"Yo Perreo Sola" by Bad Bunny	undisclosed	RISK

Performances on the eleventh episode
#	Stage name	Song	Identity	Result
1	Gato	"Blinding Lights" by The Weeknd	Rafaella Chávez	OUT
2	Mono Tití	"El Santo Cachón" by Los Embajadores Vallenatos	undisclosed	WIN
3	Palenquera	"Sin Pijama" by Becky G and Natti Natasha	undisclosed	RISK

Performances on the twelfth episode
#	Stage name	Song	Identity	Result
1	Cacatúa	"Tattoo" by Rauw Alejandro and Camilo	Alicia Machado	OUT
2	Palenquera	"Pégate" by Ricky Martin	undisclosed	RISK
3	Gallinazo	"HP" by Maluma	undisclosed	WIN

=== Week 6 (13 and 14 November) ===
- Group Performance: "La Gozadera" by Gente de Zona feat. Marc Anthony

Performances on the thirteenth episode
#	Stage name	Song	Identity	Result
1	Mono Tití	"Hakuna Matata" from The Lion King	undisclosed	RISK
2	Zorro	"Las Avispas" by Juan Luis Guerra	undisclosed	WIN

Performances on the fourteenth episode
#	Stage name	Song	Identity	Result
1	Zorro	"Dakiti" by Bad Bunny and Jhay Cortez	undisclosed	WIN
2	Palenquera	"La Negra Tiene Tumbao" by Celia Cruz	undisclosed	RISK
3	Mono Tití	"Ai Se Eu Te Pego" by Michel Teló	undisclosed	WIN
4	Gallinazo	"Valió la Pena" by Marc Anthony	Sebastián Villalobos	OUT

Performances on the fifteenth episode
#	Stage name	Song	Identity	Result
1	Palenquera	"La Vecina" by Cristina Maica	Natalia Bedoya	OUT
2	Mono Tití	"El Santo Cachón" by Los Embajadores Vallenatos	undisclosed	RISK
3	Zorro	"La Camisa Negra" by Juanes	undisclosed	WIN

Performances on the sixteenth episode
#	Stage name	Song	Identity	Result
1	Mono Tití	"Las Locuras Mías" by Silvestre Dangond	Beto Villa	OUT
2	Zorro	"El Jean" by Iván Zuleta Barros and Diomedes Díaz	undisclosed	WIN

=== Week 7 (20 and 21 November) ===
Performances on the seventeenth episode
#	Stage name	Song	Identity	Result
1	Coco Loco	"Mi Gente" by J Balvin and Willy William	undisclosed	WIN
2	Dorado	"Perdoname" by Gilberto Santa Rosa	Faustino Asprilla	OUT
3	Conejo	"La Vida Es Un Carnaval" by Celia Cruz	undisclosed	RISK

Performances on the eighteenth episode
#	Stage name	Song	Identity	Result
1	Pez	"Calma" by Pedro Capó	undisclosed	RISK
2	Monstruo	"Everybody (Backstreet's Back)" by Backstreet Boys	undisclosed	RISK
3	Colibrí	"Gasolina" by Daddy Yankee feat. Glory	undisclosed	WIN

Performances on the nineteenth episode
#	Stage name	Song	Identity	Result
1	Caimán	"Vamo' a Portarnos Mal" by Calle 13	undisclosed	WIN
2	Rin Rín	"Te Vi" by Piso 21 and Micro TDH	undisclosed	RISK
3	Madremonte	"Limón y sal" by Julieta Venegas	Elianis Garrido	OUT

Performances on the twentieth episode
#	Stage name	Song	Identity	Result
1	Tarántula	"Chantaje" by Shakira feat. Maluma	undisclosed	RISK
2	Muñeca	"I Will Survive" by Gloria Gaynor	undisclosed	WIN
3	Panda	"Hawái" by Maluma	undisclosed	WIN
4	Toro	"Taki Taki" by DJ Snake feat. Selena Gomez, Ozuna and Cardi B	undisclosed	RISK

=== Week 8 (27 and 28 November) ===
Performances on the twenty-first episode
#	Stage name	Song	Identity	Result
1	Burro	"Adiós Amor" by Christian Nodal	undisclosed	WIN
2	Orquídea	"Pedro Navaja" by Willie Colón and Rubén Blades	undisclosed	RISK
3	Azulejo	"Mis Ojos Lloran Por Ti" by Big Boy feat. Angel Lopez	Mabel Moreno	OUT

Performances on the twenty-second episode
#	Stage name	Song	Identity	Result
1	Coco Loco	"Livin' la Vida Loca" by Ricky Martin	undisclosed	WIN
2	Pez	"Vivir Lo Nuestro" by La India and Marc Anthony	Shaira	OUT
3	Muñeca	"Con Altura" by Rosalía and J Balvin feat. El Guincho	undisclosed	RISK

Performances on the twenty-third episode
#	Stage name	Song	Identity	Result
1	Conejo	"Todos Me Miran" by Gloria Trevi	undisclosed	RISK
2	Monstruo	"El Amante" by Nicky Jam	undisclosed	WIN
3	Caimán	"Metele Sazon" by Tego Calderón	undisclosed	RISK

Performances on the twenty-fourth episode
#	Stage name	Song	Identity	Result
1	Colibrí	"Se Te Nota" by Lele Pons and Guaynaa	undisclosed	WIN
2	Rin Rín	"No Podrás" by Cristian Castro	undisclosed	RISK
3	Burro	"Decisiones" by Rubén Blades	undisclosed	WIN
4	Toro	"Favorito" by Camilo	Daniel Calderón	OUT

=== Week 9 (4 and 5 December) ===
Performances on the twenty-fifth episode
#	Stage name	Song	Identity	Result
1	Orquídea	"Mañana es Too Late" by Jesse & Joy and J Balvin	undisclosed	RISK
2	Panda	"Vida de Rico" by Camilo	undisclosed	WIN
3	Tarántula	"Jacuzzi" by Greeicy and Anitta	undisclosed	RISK

Performances on the twenty-sixth episode
#	Stage name	Song	Identity	Result
1	Colibrí	"Cásate Conmigo" by Silvestre Dangond and Nicky Jam	undisclosed	RISK
2	Muñeca	"Ecos de Amor" by Jesse & Joy	undisclosed	WIN
3	Burro	"En la Ciudad de la Furia" by Soda Stereo	undisclosed	RISK
4	Monstruo	"Cuando Seas Grande" by Miguel Mateos	undisclosed	WIN

Performances on the twenty-seventh episode
#	Stage name	Song	Identity	Result
1	Coco Loco	"Yo No Sé Mañana" by Luis Enrique	undisclosed	WIN
2	Caimán	"Ron Pa' Todo el Mundo" by Joe Arroyo feat. Diomedes Díaz	undisclosed	RISK
3	Tarántula	"Mala Fama" by Danna Paola	Johanna Fadul	OUT

Performances on the twenty-eighth episode
#	Stage name	Song	Identity	Result
1	Rin Rín	"Amante Bandido" by Miguel Bosé	Agmeth Escaf	OUT
2	Orquídea	"Pa' Mala Yo" by Natti Natasha	undisclosed	WIN
3	Conejo	"Robarte un Beso" by Carlos Vives and Sebastián Yatra	undisclosed	RISK
4	Panda	"La Rebelión" by Joe Arroyo	undisclosed	WIN

=== Week 10 (11 and 12 December) ===
Performances on the twenty-ninth episode
#	Stage name	Song	Identity	Result
1	Muñeca	"Vente Pa' Ca" by Ricky Martin feat. Maluma	undisclosed	RISK
2	Monstruo	"Amarillo" by J Balvin	undisclosed	RISK
3	Coco Loco	"Matador" by Los Fabulosos Cadillacs	undisclosed	WIN

Performances on the thirtieth episode
#	Stage name	Song	Identity	Result
1	Caimán	"Los Charcos" by Fruko y sus Tesos	undisclosed	WIN
2	Colibrí	"Chica Ideal" by Sebastián Yatra and Guaynaa	undisclosed	RISK
3	Conejo	"¡Corre!" by Jesse & Joy	Marilyn Patiño	OUT

=== Week 11 (18 and 19 December) ===
Performances on the thirty-first episode
#	Stage name	Song	Identity	Result
1	Panda	"Despacito" by Luis Fonsi feat. Daddy Yankee	undisclosed	WIN
2	Orquídea	"Cómo Te Atreves" by Morat	María Conchita Alonso	OUT
3	Burro	"Duele el Corazón" by Enrique Iglesias feat. Wisin	undisclosed	RISK

Performances on the thirty-second episode
#	Stage name	Song	Identity	Result
1	Muñeca	"Falsas Esperanzas" by Christina Aguilera	undisclosed	RISK
2	Monstruo	"Mia" by Bad Bunny feat. Drake	undisclosed	WIN
3	Colibrí	"Se Me Olvidó" by Christian Nodal	undisclosed	RISK
4	Coco Loco	"Ni Gucci Ni Prada" by Kenny Man	undisclosed	WIN

Performances on the thirty-third episode
#	Stage name	Song	Identity	Result
1	Caimán	"Amarte Más No Pude" by Diomedes Díaz	undisclosed	RISK
2	Burro	"Tu Recuerdo" by Ricky Martin feat. La Mari and Tommy Torres	undisclosed	WIN
3	Panda	"Matemos las Ganas" by Jessi Uribe	Mr. Black	OUT

Performances on the thirty-fourth episode
#	Stage name	Song	Identity	Result
1	Burro	"La Flaca" by Santana feat. Juanes	undisclosed	RISK
2	Coco Loco	"Danza Kuduro" by Don Omar and Lucenzo	undisclosed	WIN
3	Muñeca	"Chandelier" by Sia	undisclosed	RISK

=== Week 12 (15 and 16 January) ===
Performances on the thirty-fifth episode
#	Stage name	Song	Identity	Result
1	Caimán	"La Yerbita" by Victorio Vergara	undisclosed	RISK
2	Colibrí	"Vuelve" by Ricky Martin	undisclosed	WIN
3	Monstruo	"Loco Contigo" by DJ Snake, J Balvin and Tyga	Iván Marín	OUT

- Group Performance: "Sube a mi Moto" by Menudo

Performances on the thirty-sixth episode
#	Stage name	Song	Identity	Result
1	Caimán	"Rumores" by Billo's Caracas Boys	Mario Duarte	OUT
2	Muñeca	"Tu Amor Me Hace Bien" by Marc Anthony	undisclosed	RISK
3	Coco Loco	"La Llave de mi Corazón" by Juan Luis Guerra	undisclosed	WIN

Performances on the thirty-seventh episode
#	Stage name	Song	Identity	Result
1	Burro	"Serenata" by Mike Bahía	undisclosed	WIN
2	Colibrí	"Busco Alguien Que Me Quiera" by El Afinaito	undisclosed	RISK

- Group Performance: "Te Voy a Hacer Falta" by Rikarena

Performances on the thirty-eighth episode
#	Stage name	Song	Identity	Result
1	Burro	"Corazón" by Maluma feat. Nego do Borel	Lucas Arnau	OUT
2	Coco Loco	"Celebration" by Kool & the Gang	undisclosed	WIN

- Group Performance: "Florecita Rockera" by Aterciopelados

=== Week 13 (22 and 23 January) ===
Performances on the thirty-ninth episode
#	Stage name	Song	Identity	Result
1	Muñeca	"Fuego" by Bomba Estéreo	undisclosed	WIN
2	Colibrí	"Bichota" by Karol G	undisclosed	RISK

Performances on the fortieth episode
#	Stage name	Song	Identity	Result
1	Colibrí	"Nota de Amor" by Wisin and Carlos Vives feat. Daddy Yankee	María Laura Quintero	OUT
2	Coco Loco	"El Cantante" by Héctor Lavoe	undisclosed	WIN
3	Muñeca	"Eres Mía" by Romeo Santos	undisclosed	RISK

Performances on the forty-first episode
#	Stage name	Song	Identity	Result
1	Muñeca	"Chandelier" by Sia		
2	Coco Loco	"Celebration" by Kool & the Gang		
3	Muñeca	"Amores Como El Nuestro" by Jerry Rivera	Carolina Sabino	OUT
4	Coco Loco	"La Ventanita" by Sergio Vargas	undisclosed	WIN

Performances on the forty-second episode
#	Stage name	Song	Identity	Result
1	Zorro	"La Bamba" by Ritchie Valens		
2	Coco Loco	"Se Me Olvidó Otra Vez" by Juan Gabriel		
3	Zorro	"Que Tire Pa Lante" by Daddy Yankee	Juan Sebastián Quintero	WINNER
4	Coco Loco	"Conga" by Miami Sound Machine	Karoll Márquez	RUNNER-UP

== Ratings ==
No.	Episode	Air date	Timeslot (COT)	Viewers (in points)
1	"El primer triple combate musical"	9 October 2021	Saturday; 9:30 p.m.	9.1
2	"Se enfrentan cuatro personajes"	10 October 2021	Sunday; 9:30 p.m.	9.4
3	"Lechuza, Lechón y Cacatúa se enfrentan"	16 October 2021	Saturday; 9:30 p.m.	7.0
4	"Tití, Esmeralda y Pantera en escenario"	17 October 2021	Sunday; 9:30 p.m.	7.7
5	"Tití, Palenquera y Gato roban corazones"	23 October 2021	Saturday; 9:30 p.m.	7.4
6	"El desenmascarado descrestó a los investigadores"	24 October 2021	Sunday; 9:30 p.m.	7.7
7	"Lechón, Esmeralda y Gallinazo regresan"	30 October 2021	Saturday; 9:30 p.m.	6.7
8	"Gato, Cacatúa, Gallinazo y Tití"	31 October 2021	Sunday; 9:30 p.m.	7.1
9–10	"Palenquera, Zorro y Esmeralda / Cacatúa, Zorro y Gallinazo"	6 November 2021	Saturday; 8:00 p.m.	3.7
11–12	"Gato, Tití y Palenquera / Los investigadores ocultan su cara"	7 November 2021	Sunday; 8:00 p.m.	5.4
13–14	"Semifinalistas de la primera etapa / Dos duelos y un desenmascarado"	13 November 2021	Saturday; 8:00 p.m.	3.8
15–16	"Desenmascarado en semifinal / Final de la primera etapa"	14 November 2021	Sunday; 8:00 p.m.	5.0
17–18	"Nuevos personajes y otra etapa / Pez, Monstruo y Colibrí"	20 November 2021	Saturday; 8:00 p.m.	4.2
19–20	"Segundo desenmascarado en nueva etapa / Tarántula vs Muñeca y Panda vs Toro"	21 November 2021	Sunday; 9:00 p.m.	5.3
21–22	"Azulejo, Burro y Orquídea / Coco Loco, Muñeca y Pez"	27 November 2021	Saturday; 8:00 p.m.	3.6
23–24	"Caimán, Conejo y Monstruo / Colibrí vs Rin Rin y Burro vs Toro"	28 November 2021	Sunday; 9:00 p.m.	4.3
25–26	"Juanda Caribe adivina el desenmascarado / Nueva propuesta de matrimonio y algo de rock"	4 December 2021	Saturday; 8:00 p.m.	3.3
27–28	"Todos los investigadores adivinaron / El desenmascarado los despistó a todos"	5 December 2021	Sunday; 9:00 p.m.	N/A
29–30	"Dos presentadores y un show sorpresa / La desenmascarada es amiga de todos"	11 December 2021	Saturday; 8:00 p.m.	3.7
31–32	"Panda, Orquídea y Burro / Monstruo vs Muñeca y Coco Loco vs Colibrí"	18 December 2021	Saturday; 8:00 p.m.	2.1
33–34	"Caimán, Burro y Panda / Show sorpresa de Zorro antes del combate"	19 December 2021	Sunday; 9:00 p.m.	3.8
35–36	"El primer desenmascarado del 2022 / 5 semifinalistas en un show único"	15 January 2022	Saturday; 8:00 p.m.	2.5
37–38	"Mike Bahía y Llane sorprenden / Difícil combate de Burro y Coco Loco"	16 January 2022	Sunday; 8:00 p.m.	3.0
39–40	"Muñeca y Colibrí rockearon en el escenario / Colibrí, Coco Loco y Muñeca buscan llegar a la final"	22 January 2022	Saturday; 8:00 p.m.	3.3
41–42	"Final de la segunda etapa / Coco Loco y Zorro se enfrentan en la gran final"	23 January 2022	Sunday; 8:00 p.m.	3.4
