= Yo Soy Kids =

- Created by: Endemol
- Presented by: Cristian Rivero (2014; 2017); Adolfo Aguilar (2017); Alexandra Hörler (2014)
- Judges: Maricarmen Marín (2014; 2017); Katia Palma (2017); Fernando Armas (2017); María Pía Copello (2014); Rodrigo González (2014)
- Country of origin: Peru
- Original language: Spanish
- No. of seasons: 8

Production
- Production locations: Lima, Perú
- Running time: 120 minutes (with commercials)

Original release
- Network: Latina Televisión
- Release: 9 March 2014 – 23 April 2022

Related
- Yo Soy (Perú)

Yo Soy Kids is a singing and imitation contest for children produced by Endemol in Peru. It premiered on March 9, 2014 by Latina. It is hosted by Cristian Rivero and Alexandra Hörler, the jury is composed of former children's entertainer María Pía Copello, singer Maricarmen Marín and presenter Rodrigo González. The coaches are the singers Katy Jara, Leslie Shaw and Cristopher Gianotti.

On November 6, 2017, after 3 years, a new season of Yo Soy Kids was released, which is more similar to the regular seasons of Yo Soy (Perú). It is conducted by Adolfo Aguilar and Cristian Rivero, while the jury is composed of Katia Palma, Maricarmen Marín and Fernando Armas.

== Format ==
The program has three judges in charge of selecting the contestants who are most similar to the artist they selected, both for their voice and for the physical resemblance. The jury is in charge of selecting the participants that will be classified to appear in the "galas", in which they will compete to reach the final.

== Seasons ==
| Season | Number of contestant | Duration dates | Finalists | | |
| Season | Number of contestant | Duration dates | First place | Second place | Third place |
|---|---|---|---|---|---|
| 1 | 13 | March 9 - June 8, 2014 | Lita Pezo (Isabel Pantoja) | Richard Castillo (Miguel Abuelo) | Pedro Crisanto (Manuel Donayre) |
| 2 | 14 | June 15 - October 13, 2014 | Erick Napa (José Feliciano) | Dana, Lucile y Nicoll (Pandora) | Nicole La Rosa (Amy Winehouse) |
| 3 | 17 | November 6 - December 15, 2017 | Julieta Ballón (Mon Laferte) | Luis Ángel Sevilla (Manuel Donayre); Vincenzo Leonardi (Justin Bieber); Christian Zarate (Héctor Lavoe) | |
| 4 | 12 | December 2 - January 13, 2020 | Paulina Villalobos (Isabel Pantoja) | Fiorella Caballero (Laura Pausini); Jefferson Pérez (Alejandro Fernández) | |
| 5 | 18 | January 14 - March 6, 2020 | Dayron Aranguren (Manuel Donayre) | Nadja Quintanilla (Christina Aguilera); Sharik Arévalo (Mon Laferte) | |
| 6 | 36 | May 17 - June 14, 2021 | Fiorella Caballero (Laura Pausini) | Milagros Chota (Amaia Montero) | Nadja Quintanilla (Christina Aguilera) |
| 7 | 80 | January 31 - March 18, 2022 | Luigui Cruz (José José) | Danniel Reyes (Héctor Lavoe) | Sharik Arévalo (Mon Laferte) |
| 8 | 23 | March 19 - April 23, 2022 | Danniel Reyes y Alberto Mejía (Héctor Lavoe) | Fiorella Caballero y Marian Díaz (Laura Pausini) | Sharik Arévalo y Oriana Montero (Mon Laferte) |
