= National Identity Card (Peru) =

National identity card of Peru

Documento Nacional de Identidad
- Type: Mandatory identity document, optional replacement for passport in the listed countries
- Issued by: Peru (RENIEC)
- First issued: 1931 (as Electoral Passbook); 1997 (as DNI)
- Purpose: Identification, travel
- Valid in: Argentina, Brazil, Bolivia, Chile, Colombia, Ecuador, Paraguay and Uruguay
- Eligibility: Peruvian citizenship
- Expiration: 8 years (age 0–59); No expiry (age 60 or over)

The Documento Nacional de Identidad (DNI) (Spanish for 'National Identity Document') is the only personal identity card recognized by the Peruvian Government for all civil, commercial, administrative, judicial acts and, in general, for all those cases in which, by legal mandate, it must be presented. It is a public document, personal, and non-transferable and also constitutes the only title of right to the suffrage of the person in whose favor it has been granted. Its issuance is in charge of the National Registry of Identification and Civil Status (RENIEC).

As of 15 July 2013, RENIEC issues the electronic DNI (DNI-e), which will gradually replace the current DNI. The electronic DNI is made of polycarbonate and has the format of a credit card, following the ISO 7816 standard. It has a chip based on the technologies of electronic signature, smart card and biometrics, and initially incorporates four software applications: the first identity eMRTD ICAO, the second digital signature PKI, the third biometric authentication by fingerprint Fingerprint Match-on-Card and a generic type room that includes data storage and Counter devices. In June 2015, the electronic DNI was recognized as the best identity document of Latin America, during the "Latin American Conference on High Security Printing" held in Lima, which was organized by the British firm Reconnaissance International, dedicated to holography, currency, authentication and documentary security.

The validity of the DNI is of eight years, term to which term the citizens have the obligation to carry out the respective procedure of renewal (if it is necessary to modify some data, these have to be carried out of obligatory form). This to keep the data updated in the civil registry. However, when a person renews his ID at age 70 or older, it will no longer expire, because the person renewed it at an age when it is no longer mandatory to have to go to vote in the elections; however, it is recommended to renew it in case of modifying some information such as marital status (in case of widowhood or divorce), change of address, etc.

Peru's identity cards can be used as travel documents to enter the Mercosur members (Argentina, Bolivia, Brazil, Paraguay, Uruguay) and associated countries (Chile, Colombia, Ecuador; except Guyana, Suriname, Panama).

== History ==
Various systems and documents have been used in Peru to keep track of their population. At the beginning, these systems were only intended for the accounting of births and deaths, to later become more complex to record all civil acts and provide the population with an identity document.

=== During the Incan Empire ===
During the Incan Empire, there was an attempt to register all the facts of importance for the society, for which they were counted the births, the deaths and other events. According to the Inca Garcilaso de la Vega, the Incas "used the interlacing of ribbons of colors and knots" to make their records, which he called "quipus" and which were in charge of an Inca administrator, which they called "Quipucamayoc". The records included births and deaths for each month, taxes paid to the Inca each year, specifying each household that did so, as well as the totality of people who went to war and died.

=== During the colonial era ===
During the colonial period the Catholic Church fulfilled the registration functions through the parishes, being governed by the Canon law. Through a Royal Order placed on 21 March 1749, the formation of Monthly statements of births, marriages and deaths was ordered, entrusting the care and custody of these books in the same parishes.

=== During the Republican era ===
After the independence of Peru had taken place, the State took charge of these functions, delegating in the first phase those responsibilities to the prefectures, subprefectures and governorates.

On 21 June 1852, the first Civil code of Peru was enacted in which the Civil Status Registers were created, whose management was in charge of the district governors. By the Constitution of 1856, provincial and district mayors are responsible for managing the registry.

==== Creation of the Electoral Notebook ====
In 1931, the Electoral Registry was created in Peru and for the first time the Electoral Board (LE) was given to citizens able to vote (men older than 21 who knew how to read and write). It also served as an identity card and was the first in the country, but its main purpose was for electoral purposes.

In 1946, the Municipal Electoral Record (LEM) was created. This document had the appearance of a small book with a cover and back cover and four inner sheets. The material from which it was made was simple paper. Among the security measures were the fingerprint, the signature of the registrar, the signature of the registered and the seal of the Municipal Electoral Registry.

In 1963 the 7 Digit Electoral Notebook was created, which was a three-body document. This document was delivered during the first government of President Fernando Belaunde Terry. The material in which this notebook was made was thin white duplex cardboard.

In 1978 the Identity Registry for Illiterates (RIA) was created, because before the appearance of this document, illiterates were not taken into account to be identified. This document was made in simple cardboard pink, and consisted of two bodies. Among the security measures we mention the reverse side with the inscription in miniature letters with the text "Decree Law No. 22379", stamp and signature of the registrar, the fingerprint printing, and the seal of the Identification Record of the National Jury of Elections on top of the photograph.

In 1984, the 8-Digit Electoral Notebook was created. The material that continued being used in these years was the thin duplex cardboard of white color to three bodies. Among its security measures was the inscription in salmon color with letters in miniature the text "National Elections Jury", number of the Electoral Record on the cover, signature of the inscribed, seal and signature of the registrar, stamp of the National Elections Board on top of photography and fingerprint.

==== Creation of the National Document of Identification ====
The contemporary National Document of Identification (nicknamed DNI) created in 1997 in its modified version in 2005

In 1993 the National Registry of Identification and Civil Status (RENIEC) was created as an autonomous body of the State in charge of registering births, marriages, deaths, divorces and others that modify marital status. Subsequently, in 1995, the Unique Registry of Identification of Natural Persons was created.

In 1996 to 1998 the Mechanized Electoral Record (LEM) was created, a transitory document but whose information was already typed by computerized means, there being no data that was manually entered.

In 1997 the National Identity Document (DNI) was created as a personal identity card in definitive replacement of the Electoral Record. Public, personal and non-transferable document. Its original format was ISO ID-02 of 10 cm wide and 7 cm long and of a single body. In 2005 the ISO ID-01 format similar to the size of a credit card 8.54 cm wide by 5.4 cm long was approved.

With the creation of the DNI, the ID of minors whose print is of a different color to that of adults is also created. The measures are the same as for the adult DNI, except for the lack of fingerprint and scanned signature that corresponds to the adult who declares it before the RENIEC. Original format ISO ID-02, 10 cm wide by 7 cm long.

In 2005, the ISP ID-01 format, 8.54 cm wide × 5.4 cm long, was approved. The ID of minors serves to ensure access to health, education, food and security services for Peruvian children and adolescents.

In 2013 the Electronic ID was implemented, a document that has a chip and allows citizens to identify themselves on the Internet and "make transactions with the State from any point of access to the network, for example, from the comfort of their home." Young people of 18 years who for the first time process their ID will be the first to obtain it in its electronic version.

== Characteristics of the electronic DNI ==
=== Characteristics of the microchip ===
- Java Card operating system, which enables the incorporation of future applications and content.
- Cryptographic capacity for RSA key management and digital signature with certificates.
- EEPROM memory of 144 Kb.
- Security according to the international standards Common Criteria level EAL4 + or FIPS 140-2.
- Basic Access Control (BAC), which prevents unauthorized access to the content of the chip.
- Active Authentication (AA), RSA key of 1024 bits that guarantees the authenticity of the chip and prevents its cloning.
- Applications: PKI, ICAO eMRTD, Match On Card (MOC).
- Complementary software: Middleware, SDK for client applications, Java Card SDK

=== Characteristics of the electronic card ===
- Background with guilloché pattern
- Printing text or patterns visible with UV light.
- Micro offset line
- Photo area with wavy micro text
- Optically Variable Device (DOVID)
- Laser engraving
- Optically variable ink (Optical Variable Ink – OVI)
- Microscopic safety element (JDSU charms)
- Variable Laser Image (CLI)
- Authentication procedures and electronic signature
- Authentication process with the MOC application (Match-on-Card)
- The chip of the card has an authentication system through biometric technology, which stores information on the digital impressions of the index fingers of each hand.

=== Authentication procedure and electronic signature with the PKI application ===
The electronic DNI offers the possibility of digitally signing electronic documents and authenticating the identity through the PKI application. To make use of this tool, the user must have a card reader connected to a computer, and optionally, a Fingerprint reader or Biometric reader.

To authenticate the identity: The citizen enters the website of the public institution. If identification is required, you must enter your ID card in the card reader. The verification is produced by entering the authentication PIN (Personal Identification Number) or if you have a biometric reader, the fingerprint.

To sign electronically: In order for the citizen to digitally sign an electronic form or document, you must first enter your ID card in the card reader, the system will request the signature PIN, the card will carry out the verification, if satisfactory, a digitally signed file.

== Certificates included ==
The chip of the DNI-e will contain the digital certificates shown below:

- Root certificate of the National Certification Entity of the Peruvian State – ECERNEP
- Digital certificate of the Certification Entity of the Peruvian State – ECEP
- Digital certificates of the citizen

== Information shown on the electronic ID ==
In a similar way to the previous DNI, the DNI-e contains the following information:

- CUI number (Unique Identification Code)
- First surname (paternal surname)
- Second surname (maternal surname)
- Other names
- Sex
- Civil status
- Birthdate
- Place of birth (code of the department, province and district)
- Date of issue
- Date of expiration
- Voting group
- Organ donation
- Photo
- Firm
- Right index fingerprint
- Department, province and district of housing
- Address
