= Ciro Alegría =

Peruvian journalist, politician, and novelist (1909–1967)

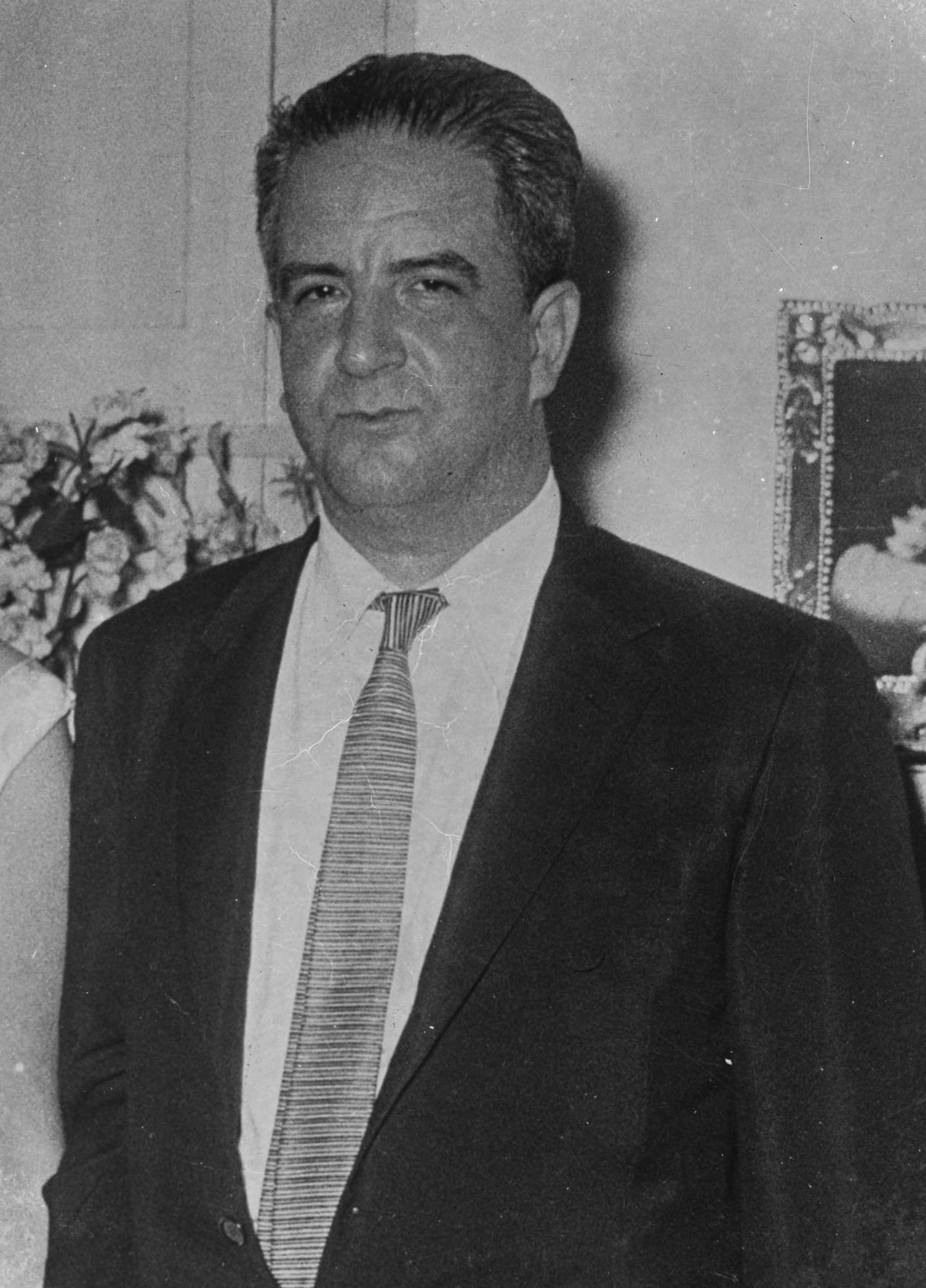
- Alegría in 1934
- Born: Ciro Alegría Bazán; November 4, 1909; Sartimbamba, La Libertad, Peru
- Died: February 17, 1967 (aged 57); Chaclacayo, Lima, Peru
- Known for: Novelist, politician, journalist
- Notable work: El mundo es ancho y ajeno; Los perros hambrientos; La serpiente de oro
- Political party: Popular Action
- Spouse: Dora Varona (m. 1957)
- Children: 4, including Alonso
- Awards: 1935, Nascimento Award; 1938 Zigzag Award

Ciro Alegría Bazán (November 4, 1909 – February 17, 1967) was a Peruvian journalist, politician, and novelist. He is considered the greatest Peruvian novelist in history with three monumental novels: The Golden Serpent (La Serpiente de oro), The World is Wide and Alien (El Mundo es Ancho y Ajeno), and The Hungry Dogs (Los Perros Hambrientos). César Vallejo, Mario Vargas Llosa, Ciro Alegría, and José María Arguedas are the three greats of Peruvian literature.

== Biography ==
Born in Huamachuco District, he exposed the problems of the Native Peruvians while learning about their way of life. This understanding of how they were oppressed was the focus for his novels. He attended classes at the University of Trujillo, and worked briefly as a journalist for the newspaper El Norte.

In 1930, Alegría joined the Aprista movement, dedicated to social reform as well as improving the welfare of Native Peruvians. He was imprisoned several times for his political activities before finally being exiled to Chile in 1934.

He remained in exile in both Chile and later the United States up until 1948. Later, he taught at the University of Puerto Rico, and wrote about the Cuban revolution while in Cuba. His most well known novel, Broad and Alien is the World (1941) or El mundo es ancho y ajeno, won the Latin American Novel Prize in 1941, and brought him international attention. It depicts an Andean community, living in the Peruvian highlands. The book was later published in the United States and has been reprinted many times, in multiple languages. He lived in Puerto Rico, USA and Cuba.

Alegría returned to Peru in 1960. He joined President Fernando Belaúnde Terry's party (Acción Popular) and was elected to the Chamber of Deputies in 1963. He died unexpectedly in Lima, Peru on February 17, 1967. After his death, his widow Dora Varona published many of his essays and reports he had written for various newspapers. He was 57 years old.

== Works ==
Ciro Alegria published, among others, the following works:

- La serpiente de oro ("The golden snake")
- Los perros hambrientos ("The hungry dogs")
- El mundo es ancho y ajeno ("Broad and Alien is the World", ISBN 0-85036-282-2 Merlin Press, United Kingdom).
- Duelo de caballeros ("Gentlemen's duel")
- La leyenda del nopal ("The legend of cactus")
- Las aventuras de Machu Picchu ("Adventurous Tales of Machu Picchu")

== See also ==
- Peruvian literature
- List of Peruvian writers
