= Dora Varona =

Cuban-Peruvian poet, narrator, and missionary (1932–2018)

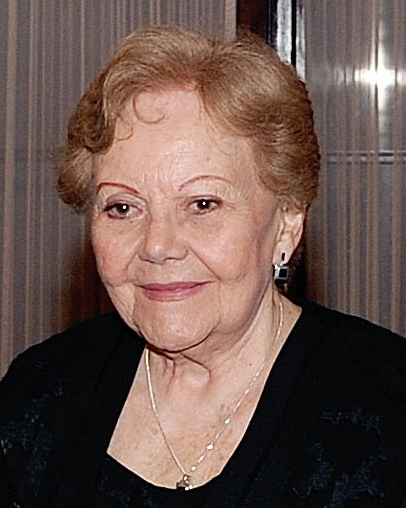
- Born: Dora Varona Gil; 19 June 1932; Santiago de Cuba, Cuba
- Died: 7 March 2018 (aged 85); Lima, Peru
- Education: Complutense University of Madrid
- Occupations: Writer, missionary
- Spouse: Ciro Alegría (1957–1967)
- Children: Cecilia Alegría Varona; Gonzalo Alegría Varona
- Relatives: Enrique José Varona (grandfather)

Dora Varona Gil (19 June 1932 – 7 March 2018) was a Cuban-Peruvian poet, narrator, and missionary. After the death of her husband, Peruvian writer Ciro Alegría, she compiled, edited, and studied his work.

== Biography ==
Dora Varona was born in Santiago de Cuba on 19 June 1932, the daughter of Ricardo Varona and María Gil, and granddaughter of the writer Enrique José Varona. After completing school in her hometown, she specialized in pedagogy at the University of Oriente in 1951, and later moved to Madrid, where she joined the journalism faculty of the Complutense University in 1955. The following year she obtained the degree of Bachelor in Literature and Hispano-American Literature.

She returned to Cuba, and on 25 May 1957 she married the Peruvian novelist Ciro Alegría, who had been one of her professors at the University of Oriente. Her daughter Maria Cecilia Alegria Vatona was born in Santiago, Cuba, on December 23, 1858. Shortly afterward, she accompanied her husband on his return to Peru, where they decided to settle because of the Cuban Revolution. From her union with Alegría she had four children: Cecilia (born 1958), Ciro Benjamín (born 1961), Gonzalo (born 1962), and Diego (born 1967).

After Alegría's death on 17 February 1967, she dedicated herself to rescuing and publishing his manuscripts. For this purpose she founded the publishing house Ediciones Varona (1970–1985), where she came to collect 27 titles in addition to works published during the writer's lifetime.

A deep process of reconnection with the Christian faith led Varona to redefine her literary perspectives. She traveled to Santiago, Chile to pursue studies in Pastoral Theology at the Latin American Institute of Theological Studies in 1989, where she was received as a missionary in 1992. She devoted herself to this work full-time. She was the founder and spiritual counselor of the Faithful Christian Community (Spanish: Comunidad Cristiana Maestro Fiel).

In the late 1990s she resumed compiling and publishing her husband's works. In her last years she lived in Lima, spreading the memory of Ciro Alegría, participating in tributes offered to the writer. On 17 February 2010 she was present at a tribute to Alegría at The House of Peruvian Literature, where she inaugurated an exhibition of his photographs and personal objects, and that was attended by President Alan García.

Dora Varona died in Lima on 7 March 2018 from pulmonary fibrosis.

== Works ==
=== Poetry collections ===
- Rendija al alma, Havana, Pérez Sierra y Hermano, 1952. Instituto de Cultura Hispánica Award (Cuba, 1952). With this work Varona obtained a scholarship to study literature in Madrid.
- Hasta aquí otra vez, Madrid, Rialp, 1955. Finalist for the Premio Adonáis de Poesía, Madrid, 1956.
- El litoral cautivo, Buenos Aires, Editorial Losada, 1968
- Estado de gracia (poetic anthology). Lima, Fondo Editorial Cultura Peruana, 2014

A collection of 66 sonnets titled Bajo Dios was never published, because, according to her account, it was burned by Ciro Alegría out of a jealous suspicion that one of the sonnets was written about another man.

=== Prose ===
- Los que no se fueron (1955), collection of interviews with Salvador Dalí, Jacinto Benavente, Pío Baroja, Azorín, Ramón Menéndez Pidal, Camilo José Cela, and other cultural personalities of Spain
- A la sombra del cóndor (Lima, Diselpesa, 1993), biography illustrated by Ciro Alegría
- Resurgimiento de evangelizadores laicos (1993)
- Tico y Bebita en la isla de Cuba (2007), a novel collecting stories from Varona's childhood
- Ciro Alegría y su sombra (Lima, Editorial Planeta del Perú, 2008), a new version of the previous biography A la sombra del cóndor, with one subchapter removed

== Collection and publication of the works of Ciro Alegría ==
To the four titles published in life by Ciro Alegría (the novels La serpiente de oro, Los perros hambrientos, and El mundo es ancho y ajeno, and the story collection Duelo de caballeros), Dora Varona added 27 volumes based on unpublished manuscripts and writings in Latin American periodicals, as well as editions and anthological reissues.

- Panki y el guerrero (Lima, 1968), short stories and tales for children. José María Eguren National Award for Children's Literature.
- Gabriela Mistral íntima (Lima, Editorial Universo, 1969), essay
- Sueño y verdad de América (Lima, Editorial Universo, 1969), historical stories
- La ofrenda de piedra (Lima, Editorial Universo, 1969), Andean stories
- Siempre hay caminos (Lima, Ediciones Varona, 1969), novella
- El dilema de Krause (Lima, Ediciones Varona, 1969), unfinished novel
- La revolución cubana: un testimonio personal (Lima, Editorial PEISA, 1971)
- Lázaro (Buenos Aires, Editorial Losada, 1973), unfinished novel
- Mucha suerte con harto palo (Buenos Aires, Editorial Losada, 1976), memoirs of the writer, based on compilations of his various writings
- Siete cuentos quirománticos (Lima, Ediciones Varona, 1978), urban narratives
- El sol de los jaguares (Lima, Ediciones Varona, 1979), Amazonian stories
- Fábulas y leyendas americanas (Madrid, Editorial Espasa-Calpe, 1982)
- Sueño y verdad de América (Madrid, Alfaguara, 1985)
- Fitzcarraldo, el dios del oro negro (Madrid, Alfaguara, 1986), short stories
- Sacha en el reino de los árboles (Madrid, Alfaguara, 1986), short stories
- Nace un niño en los Andes (Madrid, Alfaguara, 1986), short stories
- Once animales con alma y uno con garras (Madrid, Alfaguara, 1987), stories based on fragments of the writer's first three novels
- El ave invisible que canta en la noche (Madrid, Alfaguara, 1989), stories extracted entirely from El mundo es ancho y ajeno
- Novela de mis novelas (Lima, PUCP, 2004), large selection of Alegría's articles on culture and literary criticism, with an introduction by Ricardo Silva Santisteban
- Mi alforja de caminante (Lima, Editorial Norma, 2007), short stories and tales
- El zorro y el conejo (Lima, Editorial Norma, 2008)
- Cartas de Amor para una Alumna (Lima, Editorial Universitaria-URP, 2009), bringing together the story of Varona's epistolary love with Alegría
