= Mónica Santa María =

Peruvian model and TV hostess

- Born: 6 December 1972; Miraflores, Lima, Peru
- Died: 13 March 1994 (aged 21); La Molina, Lima, Peru
- Cause of death: Suicide by gunshot
- Other name: Dalina chiquita
- Occupations: Television host, model
- Years active: 1982–1994

Mónica Janette Santa María Smith (Lima; December 6, 1972 — March 13, 1994) was a Peruvian model and TV hostess. Born in Lima, she was one of the two original presenters of Nubeluz, a popular Peruvian children's TV show during the first half of the 1990s, for which she was also known as the Dalina chiquita. Her shocking suicide in early 1994 would affect the programme's reputation, leading to its cancellation in 1996.

== Early life ==
Santa María was born in Lima on December 6, 1972, to Danilo Santa María, from Trujillo, and Judith Smith, from Canada. The second of three sisters, she grew up in the San Antonio neighbourhood of the district of Miraflores, at a house in Roca y Boloña avenue. She attended the Colegio Nuestra Señora del Carmen, a Catholic private school in the district, as did her sisters Liz and Sandra. Her father's sister Judith was an educator. Santa María was a vegetarian from a young age.

She began modelling at the age of six, which her father did not approve, and landed her first TV commercial shortly thereafter. At the age of eleven, she starred in a TV commercial for a popular shampoo named "Ammen". When she turned 13, she became the face of a well-known Peruvian cosmetic company, Yanbal. After finishing high school in December 1989, she briefly appeared in Chiquiticosas, a TV show.

In March 1990, she was the first of 300 women in total who auditioned to be one of the hostess of a new children's TV show Nubeluz, being immediately picked for the role. She was joined by her friend and fellow model, Almendra Gomelsky, hosting the show from late 1990 to early 1994, which became one of the most popular TV shows of its time. Both were known as the Dalinas, a portmanteau from dama linda ("Pretty Lady"). Santa María was known as the "Dalina chiquita" and was by far the most successful hostess in the show, earning the most money out of them all.

Santa María started her studies at the Centro de Desarrollo Gerencial, a teaching centre of the University of the Pacific in June 1990. Despite her outstanding grades, she was forced to abandon the centre in August 1992 due to the TV show's popularity, which forced her to go on tours around the country.

== Personal life ==
Santa María was romantically involved with Diego Manuel Ferrand Palacios, but their relationship did not end well. She developed depression and attempted suicide for the first time in late 1991 by overdosing on medicine, being taken to the British American Hospital and starting a treatment, which included the consumption of barbiturates to be able to sleep, after her release. She then dated actor Diego Bertie for two weeks.

She then dated Arturo Bayly, with whom she was recorded having sexual intercourse by a criminal group led by Fernando de Romaña Azalde, after which she was blackmailed and a scandal broke out in the media in what was known as the Caligula scandal. In late 1992, she met Constantino Heredia, known as "Tino" by friends, the son of the then owner of PepsiCo in Peru. Heredia was divorced and had a son, with his ex-wife living in the United States. Santa María was fond of Heredia's son, with whom she had a positive relationship.

The success of Nubeluz caused her to develop psychological stress and worsened her depression due to her lack of privacy, leaving the show in 1993 to spend more time with Heredia in the US. Despite this, Heredia had to make constant business trips to Peru, which led her to return to the show alongside Gomelsky, Lilianne Braun and Xiomara Xibillé. Her mental state developed into a bipolar disorder which was never properly treated, as she attempted a psychiatric treatment at the Clínica San Borja in January 1994, but was unable to handle the situation and left three hours later. A month later, she returned to the A&E department after overdosing on 37 pills. She attempted suicide a total of six times throughout her lifetime.

After her death, friends of her claimed that her father's disapproval of her career in television affected her deeply, causing her to feel alone. Santa María was private about her mental health, whose details were only known by those closest to her.

== Death ==
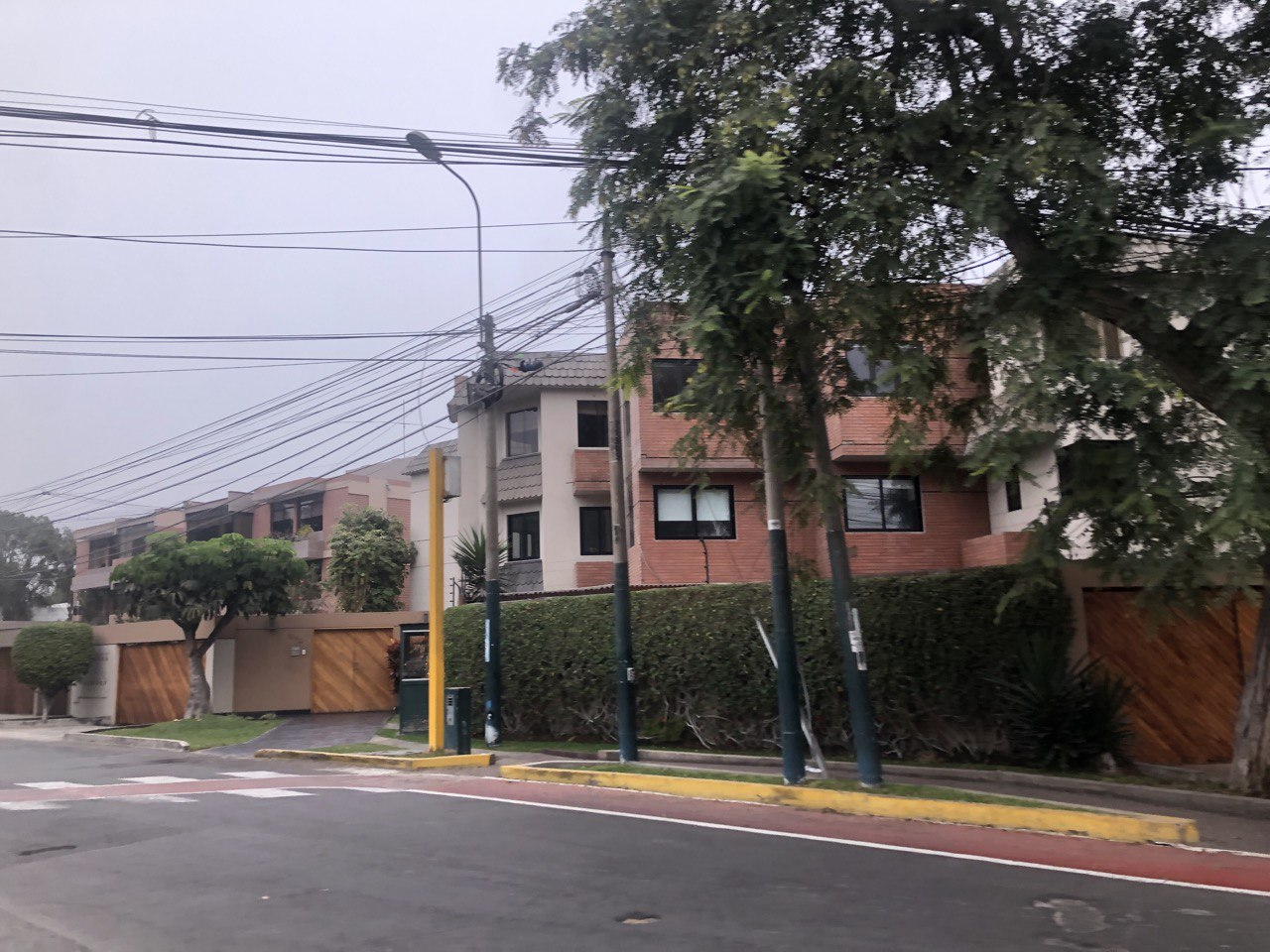
The apartment building where Santa María lived and committed suicide

Santa María and Heredia attended the wedding of the latter's friend, Héctor Banquero Herrera, at María Reina Church in San Isidro, on March 12, 1994. During the after party, their friends asked when the couple would marry, to which Heredia replied negatively after she revealed her desire to marry. Angered by the response, she publicly left the party on a taxi that took her to her parents' house, where she noticed that she had forgotten a suitcase at Heredia's red Mitsubishi car, parked at his residence. She drove in her car to the building, taking Heredia's 9mm SIG Sauer while waiting to be attended to. She then drove to her empty apartment building in La Molina, purchased five months prior. The couple had already argued over the subject before. Santa María had been a point of attention during the event, signing autographs for her fans present at the party, which included children.

Heredia received a call from Santa María at 11 p.m., who claimed that she was going to use his pistol to commit suicide. This caused him to contact her parents before leaving to be with friends in a beach south of Lima. Santa María's parents arrived at her residence and left after she claimed that Heredia's claims were false and that she was too tired and needed to rest. After her parents left convinced of what she told them, she called him again telling him to not call her parents and that, after she was done with it, he would get his gun back soon from César Coello—the engineer in charge of their new apartment—saying that it was the only thing he was interested in.

Between 1:00 and 1:30 a.m. on March 13, she fired a round into the air, which was heard by the building's doorman, who thought it came from somewhere else. Another gunshot was heard at 3:30 a.m. Her body was found the following day, 32 hours after her death, laying on her bed with an apparent gunshot wound, still wearing the black dress she wore to the party. Beside her were 60 flunitrazepam pills. Her family members altered the crime scene hoping to hide that she had committed suicide, claiming to local reporters that an accident had taken place when she was cleaning the pistol, allegedly purchased by her to protect herself after being mugged. Despite this, public prosecutor Dr. Juan Coraje Carranza, who arrived at the crime scene alongside police, already presumed that a suicide had taken place, which was eventually the police's conclusion after her message to Heredia was discovered on his answering machine.

In a 2024 interview with Verónica Linares, Santa María's co-star, Almendra Gomelsky, claimed that Santa María called her phone in Miami the night prior to the party about her sadness over an argument with Heredia. Gomelsky suggested that she fly to the US, where she could relax and go shopping with her and Lilianne Braun, with whom she was vacationing. Santa María agreed and bought the plane tickets. After becoming aware of her suicide, they immediately returned to Peru. Gomelsky was tasked with the announcement of her death in Nubeluz, which began to decline until it ended in the summer of 1996. Monica was buried in the Jardines de la Paz cemetery in La Molina, at "Los Pinos F" pavilion.

== See also ==
- Nubeluz
- Sube a mi nube
