= Verónica Linares =

Peruvian journalist, television and radio presenter

Veronica Linares
- Born: Verónica Linares Cotrina; 13 June 1976 (age 50); Lima, Peru
- Education: University of San Diego; Women's University of the Sacred Heart
- Occupations: Journalist; television presenter; radio presenter
- Children: 2

Verónica Linares Cotrina (born 13 June 1976) is a Peruvian journalist, television and radio presenter.

== Early life and education ==
Linares was born in Lima, and raised in Arequipa. She studied Communication Sciences at the Women's University of the Sacred Heart, where she obtained the Bachelor's degree and then she earn Bachelor of Arts in the University of San Diego.

After graduating, She began as a reporter for 24 Horas and Good Morning Peru, on the television channel Panamericana Television. Likewise, in 2003 she began hosting the morning newscast of América Televisión Un Nuevo Día (along with Federico Salazar). In 2004, this program was renamed Primera edición.

From 2003 to 2012, she hosted the midday edition of América Noticias, and from 2003 to 2004 she also hosted the Saturday edition of América Noticias. In addition, from 2013 to 2021, together with Mario Ghibellini, she hosted Canal N N portada. In 2010, she created a YouTube channel called La Linares, where she interviews different showbiz characters and Peruvian politics.

== Career timeline ==
- 24 horas and Buenos días, Perú (Panamericana Televisión, 2000-03), reporter.
- Un nuevo día (América Televisión, 2003-04), presenter.
- América Noticias: Midday Edition (América Televisión, 2003-2012), presenter.
- América Noticias: Saturday Edition (América Televisión, 2003-2004), presenter.
- América Noticias: First edition (América Televisión, 2004-present), presenter.
- N portada (Canal N, 2013-2021), presenter.
