= Lilianne Braun =

Peruvian TV hostess. actress and activist

- Born: 8 January 1971; Lima, Peru
- Other names: Dalina traviesa Lily Kubiliun
- Occupations: TV presenter, actress, activist
- Years active: 1992–present
- Children: 2

Lilianne Rachel Braun Grodziensky (born January 8, 1971), better known as Lily Braun or as Lily Kubiliun, is a Peruvian television presenter, actress and activist. She is best known for her work in Nubeluz, joining the show in 1993 as a replacement for Mónica Santa María and receiving the nickname Dalina traviesa.

== Early life ==
Braun was born in Lima on January 8, 1971, the daughter of Harry Braun and Nejume "Noemí" Grodziensky, both children of Jewish immigrants to Peru. Her father is of Hungarian Jewish descent, while her mother was born in Lima to a Russian Jewish father and a Romanian Jewish mother. Her mother, who lived in Peru until the age of 15, is a practicing Jew and a reiki instructor in Miami with a heavy interest in Buddhism, having studied painting at the School of Fine Arts in Peru, as well as in Israel.

She studied at León Pinelo School, the city's Jewish school named after Antonio de León Pinelo, graduating in 1987. Two years later, she moved to Miami, marrying lawyer David M. Kubiliun in 1992.

== Career ==
In 1992, she replaced Mónica Santa María as one of the presenters of Nubeluz, a children's television show, forming a duo with Almendra Gomelsky. They were joined by Colombian actress Xiomara Xibillé the following year. Santa María ultimately returned to the show soon after, but the show's popularity caused her mental stress and worsened her depression, leading to her sudden suicide on March 13, 1994. The night prior to her suicide, Braun had been vacationing in Miami with Gomelsky, who was called by Santa María over her distress caused by an argument with her boyfriend, with Gomelsky suggesting that she purchase plane tickets and visit them. After becoming aware of her suicide, they immediately returned to Peru through an 11 a.m. flight, arriving at 3 p.m. and attending the wake at the Virgen de Fátima Church in Miraflores and the funeral in La Molina. Gomelsky was tasked with the announcement of her death in Nubeluz. Braun was emotionally affected by the suicide, quitting the show soon after.

Back in the US, she obtained a degree from University of Florida and started working as a school teacher. She returned to TV as a presenter for local programmes, hosting Telemundo's Sueños de Fama in 1998, and starring in the same network's Las Comadres in 2003. She later became a mediator for family cases recognised by the Supreme Court of Florida, later becoming a real estate agent. She currently works at UBQ Materials, an Israeli cleantech company.

In 2010, Braun and Gomelsky starred in ¡Grántico, Pálmani, Zum!, a live show commemorating the 20th anniversary of Nubeluz. Six years later, another anniversary show took place at the amphitheatre of the Park of the Exhibition, also featuring Xibillé. A final show, Nubeluz, la despedida, was announced in 2024 and took place at the Estadio Universidad San Marcos on July 20 of the same year, featuring the show's entire cast.

== Filmography ==
=== Television ===
Year	Title	Role	Notes
1992–1994	Nubeluz	Dalina	Presenter
2020	Esto es guerra	Herself	1 episode

=== Theatre ===
Year	Title	Role	Notes
2010	¡Grántico, Pálmani, Zum!	Dalina	Nubeluz 20th anniversary live show
2016	Nubeluz 25 años	Dalina	Nubeluz 25th anniversary live show
2024	Nubeluz, la despedida	Dalina	Nubeluz commemorative live show

== See also ==
- Nubeluz
