= Alejandra Azcárate =

Colombian del, presenter, broadcaster, comedian and actress

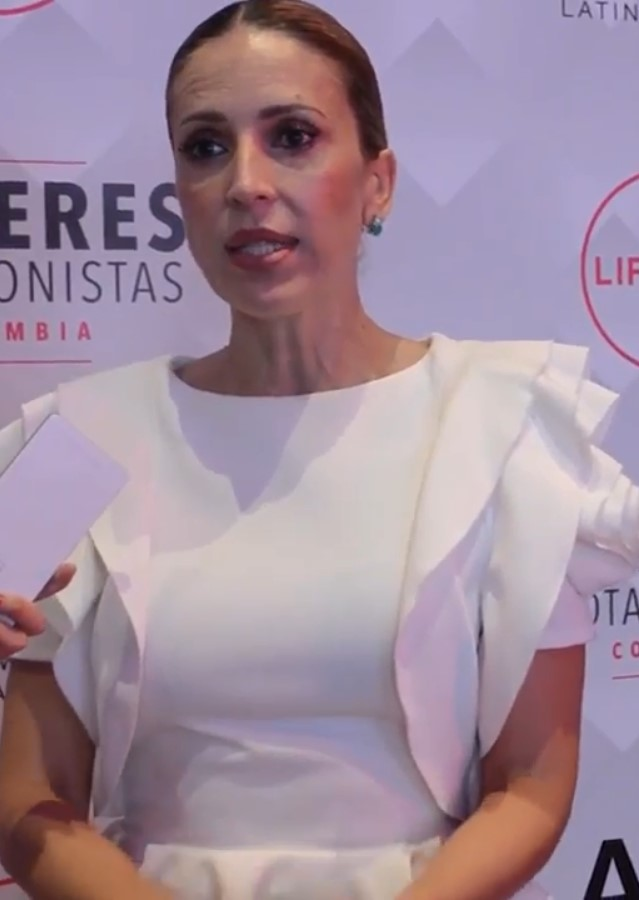
- Alejandra Azcárate in 2018
- Born: March 3, 1977 (age 48); Bogotá, Colombia
- Education: Emerson College
- Occupations: model, presenter, broadcaster, comedian and actress
- Spouse: Miguel Jaramillo Arango

Alejandra Azcárate (born March 3, 1977) is a Colombian model, presenter, broadcaster, comedian and actress.

== Biography ==
She was born on March 3, 1976, in Bogotá, Colombia, and studied political science and journalism at Emerson College in Boston, Massachusetts, United States. Her debut as a presenter was in 2002 on the local channel Bogotá City TV, as a host of entertainment and news reporter for City Noticias.

In November 2003, Alejandra returned to broadcasting, in "Descárate with Azcárate" of RCN News from the National Beauty Pageant in Cartagena, Colombia. She later changed to head Caracol News with actress Isabella Santodomingo, from the National Beauty Pageant in Cartagena.

In 2010, she began working as a comedian and touring nationally in some theaters.

Since 28 December 2021, Azcárate hosts Azcárate: No Holds Barred for Netflix, a talk show with stand-up comedy on "age, love and sex"; it was a failure.

== Filmography ==
=== Actress ===
- 2015 Diomedes, the chief of the board – Yurleidis
- 2012 The Most Holy Ana
- 2012 Wild Angel (Colombian telenovela)- Victoria Palacios Avila
- 2012 Poor Rico – Patricia Rubio
- 2011 Women killer (Colombia) – Eliana, the sister
- 2009 Love in Custody (Colombia) (TV series) – Renata Schewin
- 2008 The Last Happy Marriage – Margarita Ortiz
- 2006 on the heels of Eve (TV series) – Laura
