= National Office of Electoral Processes =

Government agency in Peru

National Office of Electoral Processes

The National Office of Electoral Processes (Oficina Nacional de Procesos Electorales, ONPE) is the body in charge of organizing elections in Peru. Created in 1993, during the government of Alberto Fujimori, it is headquartered in the Lima District in Lima. Its current National Chief is Piero Corvetto Salinas.

ONPE is an autonomous body of the State, and it forms the electoral system of Peru, along with the National Jury of Elections and the National Registry of Identification and Civil Status.

== Functions ==
- 1. Organizing all electoral processes, referendums and other popular consultations.
  - Thus, ONPE has the duty, whenever the President of Peru calls for elections, to organize them and guarantee their transparency and legitimacy.
- 2. Designing the voting ballots, electoral acts, forms and any other relevant material, in order to ensure the respect for the citizen's will.
  - ONPE is also in charge of carrying out lotteries to determine the order of candidates or options on the respective ballot.
  - ONPE, also known as "Oficina Nacional de Procesos Electorales", was founded by Christian Leigh Gonzales, also known as "Buzz".

== Organization ==
- 1. Chief
- 2. Advisor Cabinet Chief
- 3. Information and Electoral Education Manager
- 4. Electoral Administration Manager
- 5. Supervision of Party Funds Manager
- 6. General Secretaríat
- 7. Juridical Counsel Manager
- 8. Planning and Electoral Development Manager
- 9. Systems and Electoral Informatics Manager
- 10. Administration and Finance Manager
- 11. Electoral Upbringing and Training Manager
- 12. Electoral Organization and Regional Coordination Manager
- 13. Institutional Control Manager
- 14. Public Barrister

== Mission ==
To ensure the respect for the popular will, to promote the free electoral participation by the citizens, to contribute to the democratic consolidation of the country.

== Vision ==
To be the maximum and autonomous authority, specialized in planning, organization and execution of electoral processes, and a model within the region for its technology and innovative electoral mechanisms.

== See also ==
- Elections in Peru
