= Oh! Diosas =

Peruvian television variety show

Oh! Diosas (alternatively known as Oh! Diosas Peru) is a Peruvian television variety show.

The show's name, which literally translates into "Oh! Goddesses!", is also a play on the Spanish word "Odiosas", which means "hateful".

The show is transmitted on Peru Magico, a television station broadcast in Peru and North America.
