= María Pia & Timoteo =

Maria Pia y Timoteo was a Peruvian TV programme broadcast in America TV every Saturday and Sunday at 10:00 AM.

== Programmes shows in Maria Pia & Timoteo ==
TV International Hits such as SpongeBob SquarePants, Yu-Gi-oh and All Grown Up have been shown frequently in the show,. This is a list of all the TV hits featured in Maria Pia & Timoteo:

-El Chavo (1999–2005)

-All Grown Up! (2004–2005)

-SpongeBob SquarePants (2000–2005)

-El Chapulín Colorado (1999–2005)

-Yu-Gi-Oh! (2001–2005)

-Rugrats (1999–2005)

-Chespirito (1999–2005)

-Spider-Man: The New Animated Series (2003–2005)

-Hey Arnold! (2000–2001)

-Lizzie McGuire (2002–2005)

== Main cast ==
Maria Pia Copello = Maria Pia ( Ricardo Bonilla = Timoteo, the dragon
