= National Registry of Identification and Civil Status =

Personal status registration body in Peru

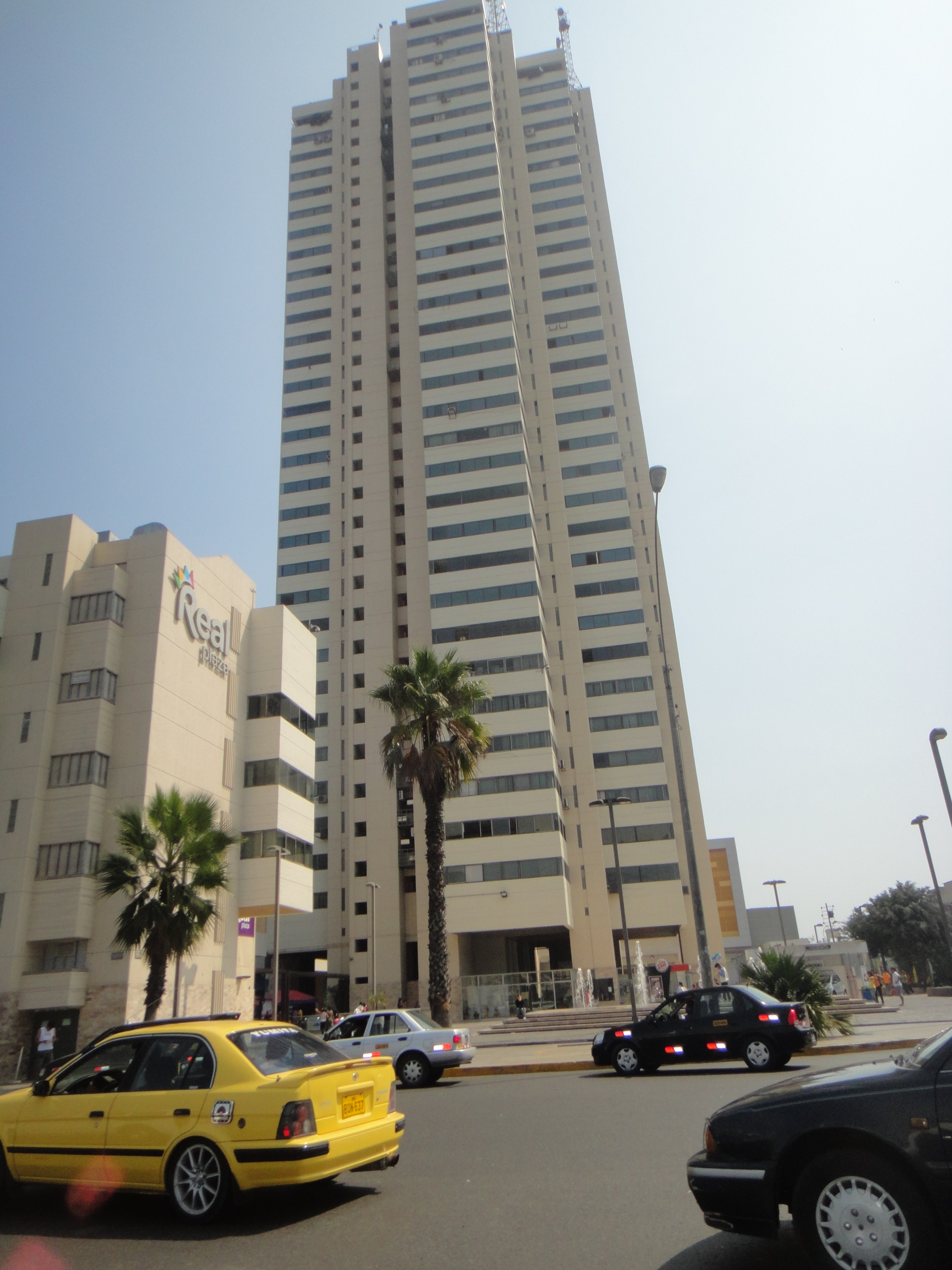

The National Registry of Identification and Civil Status (Registro Nacional de Identificación y Estado Civil, Reniec) is an autonomous constitutional body of the State of Peru. Its role is to maintain the records of births, marriages, divorces and deaths in the country, as well as of the suffrage eligibility and registration. Its headquarters are in downtown Lima.

== History ==
While RENIEC is a recently created entity, its roots can be traced to the Viceroyalty of Peru, in which the Catholic Church kept records of all people born within the territory. With the Independence of the country, the Registry System was created, which depended on what today is the National Jury of Elections.

Following the self-coup by Alberto Fujimori, the new Constitution of 1993 created the National Registry of Identification and Civil Status, to complement the National Jury of Elections and the National Office of Electoral Processes.

== Functions ==
1. Planning, organizing, directing, regulating and rationalizing the registrations of its competence;
2. Registering the births, marriages, divorces, defunctions and other acts that modify the civil status of people, as well as juridical or administrative resolutions that are susceptible to registration, and all other acts as determined by the law;
3. Emitting the corroborations of the corresponding registrations;
4. Preparing and updating the roster of eligible voters in coordination with the National Office of Electoral Processes;
5. Supplying the National Jury of Elections and the National Office of Electoral Processes with the necessary information for the fulfillment of their functions;
6. Emitting the National Identity Document (DNI) and duplicates;
7. Promoting the training of qualified personnel required by the institution, as well as the Civil Registrants and other personnel of the Registries in the system;
8. Collaborating with the pertinent police, judiciary and consular authorities for the identification of people;
9. Protecting the unrestricted respect for the right to privacy and identity and all other rights of a person as derived from the registration;
10. Implementing, organizing, maintaining and supervising the functioning of the dactyloscopic and pelmatoscopic registries;
11. Verifying the authenticity of signatures of adherents for processes as determined by the law, as well as for the exercise of political rights granted by the Constitution and the law; and
12. Any other functions assigned by the law.

== Organization ==
1. National Chief
2. National Sub-Chief
3. General Secretariat
4. Management
5. Sub-Management
6. Regionales Chiefs
7. Departmental Chiefs

== Mission ==
1. Registration of births, marriages, divorces, deaths and other events modifying the civil status.
2. Preparing and updating the roster of eligible voters (people over 18 years old).
3. Provide the other electoral authorities any information needed for their functions.
4. Updating the identification registry and emitting documents accrediting identity.

== Technology ==
RENIEC claims to be technologically more advanced than its counterparts in Latin America and than most in the European Union, in identification and civil status registration. A Peruvian consulate abroad, using special codes, can immediately identify a Peruvian citizen by several features available to them.

== See also ==
- Elections in Peru
