= Panamericana Televisión =

Peruvian broadcast television network

- Type: Broadcast Television Network
- Country: Peru
- Broadcast area: Peru

Programming
- Picture format: 1080i HDTV

Ownership
- Owner: Panamericana Televisión Inversiones S.A.C. (Grupo Paltarumi)
- Key people: Jimmy Pflücker (chairman); Leonardo Bigott (general manager)

History
- Founded: July 21, 1957; 69 years ago
- Launched: October 16, 1959; 66 years ago
- Founder: Genaro Delgado Brandt

Links
- Website: www.panamericana.pe

Availability

Terrestrial
- Analog VHF: Channel 5 (Lima, listings may vary)
- Digital VHF: Channel 5.1 (Lima, listings may vary)

Panamericana Televisión (sometimes shortened to Panamericana and formerly known as PANTEL) is a Peruvian television network, which was founded on July 21, 1957 and later began its official broadcasts on October 16, 1959.

It is Peru's third oldest television network, after TV Perú and América Televisión, respectively. From its beginnings until the end of 1996, and later in the period between early 2001 and late 2003, it was the leading television network nationwide, where it occupied around 31% of market share in 1996.

== History ==
=== Early years ===
The family of Genaro Delgado Brandt had owned radio stations in Peru since 1937. In 1953, Delgado Brandt founded Empresa Radiodifusora Panamericana S.A. ("Panamerican Radio Broadcasting Company"), whose primary station was Radio Panamericana.

Three of Delgado Brandt's kids—Genaro, Héctor and Manuel—became part of the family business. In 1956, Genaro Delgado Parker began to study the possibility of starting a television station to cover Lima, traveling to the United States, Mexico and Cuba to see the latest in television technology, and to bring it to his home country, Delgado Parker enlisted the help of Don Isaac Lindley, owner of the Inca Kola bottling plant and financial backer for the new station, and Cuban television magnate Goar Mestre, who offered him technical expertise as well as a relationship with CBS in the United States. In 1957, they established a television station called Panamericana Televisión, S.A., and a production company called Producciones Panamericana S.A.

The station had first begun its test broadcast on July 21, 1959, and then, later than two years, it began its official broadcasts on October 16, 1959, when OBXY-TV channel 13 took to the air for the first time. The launch program was hosted by Spanish actress Carmen Sevilla, while the new TV station drew on Radio Panamericana's brand by using the same ID music, derived from Harry Revel's Moon Moods.

In 1963, Genaro and Héctor Delgado Parker, in association with Johnny E. Lindley, founded Radio Programas del Perú, a radio network, of which Manuel (the youngest of the three sons) was named manager. RPP would grow to be the largest radio station operator in the country.

In 1965, Panamericana Televisión moved from channel 13 to channel 5, taking on the callsign OAY-4A and improving signal reach and reception. Soon after, Panamericana had assembled a repeater network, with five affiliate stations and 60 retransmitters to serve the rest of Peru.

The early years also saw Panamericana define itself as the market leader; news programs such as El Panamericano, hosted by Humberto Martínez Morosini and Ernesto García Calderón among others, became highly rated, while telenovelas such as Simplemente María and Natacha found success in the Latin American market. In 1966, the variety show Trampolín a la Fama, hosted by converted radio personality Augusto Ferrando would be launched, staying on the air for thirty years and becoming one of the most popular programs in the country.

1969's lunar landing broadcast - the first ever satellite broadcast in Peruvian TV history - was aired by Panamerica.

=== 1970s and 1980s ===
The 1970s began with military dictatorship. On November 9, 1971, the state took over all television stations; the next day, Peru's President Juan Velasco Alvarado decreed the expropriation of 51% of all television stations and 25% of all radio stations. Genaro Delgado Parker did not accept these terms; he fled to Buenos Aires with his family, living there until the late 1970s. While in Argentina, he bought Buenos Aires station LS 86 TV, and while he hoped to use both the station and his connections to Mestre to build a successful television center producing programs for the Spanish-speaking world, signal-quality problems there as well as the arrival of Argentina's own military dictatorship impeded his efforts, ending with his Argentine venture's expropriation in 1976. The Delgado Parker family would not return to Peru until 1978.

Back in Peru, the station came under the management of military government entities such as OCI and later Telecentro, which also operated competitor América Televisión on channel 4. The major development of the Telecentro era was a new newscast: 24 Horas (Peru), which launched in 1973, soon supplanting El Panamericano as the station's flagship news program and becoming Peru's most watched newscast.

In 1978, preparations began for the switch to color. Experimental transmissions included complete color for the 1978 FIFA World Cup, using the NTSC system. Color would be adopted across the network by May 1980, coinciding with the completion of a microwave link that consolidated Panamericana's programming across the country. On July 28, 1980, democratically elected president Fernando Belaúnde Terry returned Panamericana to Genaro and Héctor Delgado Parker. Slowly, programming changes began, such as the first morning program in the country (Buenos Días, Perú, launched in 1981) and the relaunch of its drama productions unit in 1983. In 1981, Panamericana also bought the Coliseo Amauta, a 20,000-seat venue in Lima that would be used as a site to host large events and even to film various programs.

Through the economic instability of the presidency of Alan García Pérez, Panamericana continued to grow. In 1987, Gisela Valcárcel, then a dancer on the program Risas y Salsas, got her own program, Aló Gisela, which would last five years and be the first of many in a successful television career. In 1989, Panamericana upgraded from a microwave link to a satellite one, while the Lindley family sold its remaining stake in the station to the Delgado Parker family, leading to a reorganization of the various holdings of the group. With these changes, Genaro Delgado Parker reduced his role, remaining only as the largest shareholder in the new holding company, DELPARK S.A., and leaving Héctor and Manuel in charge.

In September 1989, Héctor became wrapped up in a lengthy police case against the Túpac Amaru Revolutionary Movement, leaving Manuel in charge. Meanwhile, Genaro was founding Tele 2000 S.A.A., which would become the first cell phone company in Peru.

=== 1990s ===
The 1990s began with the creation of one of Panamericana's most successful programs, the children's show Nubeluz, hosted by Almendra Gomelsky and Mónica Santa María. Nubeluz would remain on the air until 1996, a success on the international market. However, it saw a serious ratings decline when Santa María died in 1994. The ratings decline, plus the cancellation of the program El Baúl de la Felicidad and resulting debts, triggered by the insolvency of the company that provided the prizes, caused some financial problems for Panamericana; on top of that, some personalities switched channels, causing Panamericana to fall from its customary first place in the ratings. In 1995, Panamericana produced the telenovela Canela, the first to be produced completely outside of Lima (in this case, in Arequipa).

In 1997, Ernesto Schütz Landázuri, the father of one of Manuel's children-in-law, acquired the majority of the stake in Grupo Pantel S.A. He poured investments into Panamericana, helping it return to first place and continue its national productions.

On February 1, 1999, Augusto Ferrando, host of Trampolín a la Fama, died at the age of 80, a sad note on which Panamericana would end the 1990s.

=== 2000-2004: The long shadow of crisis ===
The new millennium, however, would not be much better at the outset. In the ratings, Panamericana would be number one from 2000-2003, mostly thanks to imports from Brazil's TV Globo, Colombia's Yo soy Betty, la fea and the national production Mil oficios.

However, the crisis set in with the discovery of the Vladivideos in 2001—videos showing Vladimiro Montesinos bribing important political and business leaders. Genaro Delgado Parker was caught looking for the government's support to finish the sale of Tele 2000 to American firm BellSouth, while Schütz was seen receiving bribes to support the reelection of Alberto Fujimori. Genaro went before a judge, where the Supreme Court ruled that he could not be tried due to his advanced age, while Schütz publicly denied any manipulation of Panamericana's editorial line.

Schütz immediately fled the country, driving to Chile and being arrested to Argentina, where Peru hoped to begin an extradition process. Schütz then gave his shares in various businesses to his son, Ernesto Schütz Freundt. Meanwhile, after paying bail in Argentina, Schütz received house arrest, which was enough to send him to Switzerland, a country where he had citizenship and could not be extradited. Genaro Delgado Parker asked that he be named judicial administrator of Panamericana, and he succeeded, taking control on February 24, 2003.

On July 11 of that year, the low point of the crisis came. Schütz's administrators had received a writ of protection, which they perceived gave them the ability to take control of the primary facilities of the station, la esquina de la televisión ("Television Corner"). The result was a massive brawl, in which fire extinguishers were used as weapons, desks and chairs were thrown, and yellow paint was splattered throughout the facilities. One week later, Panamericana's license was revoked for a week, putting the station off air for the first time in its history and for a full eight days. Eventually, a new equilibrium came about: Delgado Parker's administration took control of the Lima signal and the news room, while the Schütz administration would operate the main facilities and the repeater stations, dividing Panamericana in two. After eleven months, the Superior and Supreme Courts ruled in favor of Delgado Parker and evicted Schütz Freundt from the main building, which was remodeled. On October 28, 2004, the divided Panamericana network was reconnected, launching with new equipment and a new logo.

=== 2004-2008: Parker's channel once more ===
While Genaro Delgado Parker had won the latest round of legal wars, poor management left Panamericana in budgetary shortfalls. Among the creditors of the network were its workers and the Peruvian state. The budget issues constrained Panamericana's ability to acquire new series, and its own productions mostly fell flat in the ratings. One of the few successes was the 2008 program Bailando por un sueño (Dancing for a Dream), featuring Gisela Válcarcel. By 2008, labor officials were threatening the network over a debt of 490,000 nuevos soles owed to its employees.

=== 2008-2009: The second crisis ===
On December 18, 2008, a new round of uncertainty faced Panamericana, as a judge approved a resolution that stripped Genaro Delgado Parker of the network; a cautionary measure remained in place to keep him at the position for several more months. Legal tangles were joined by action from SUNAT, the Peruvian tax agency, which in April put the physical and intellectual property of Panamericana up for auction. This auction, however, did not meet with any potential suitors. In May, Delgado Parker was forced out when the cautionary measure was lifted.

On Delgado Parker's final day at Panamericana, May 31, 2009, he surprisingly announced that he had accepted an offer from SUNAT that declared it insolvent and handed it over to its creditors. After the announcement, Panamericana employees insulted Parker and threw eggs at him as he left the headquarters.

On June 1, 2009, SUNAT took control of Panamericana Televisión, and it designated Alberto Cabello as financial administrator; he was to spend the next six months evaluating the financial and legal status of the business. However, this decision had serious consequences. Peruvian law does not have such a concept, and as SUNAT is a government agency, Panamericana had passed into government control, a potentially dangerous precedent. On June 3, Cabello resigned, sparking legal chaos. Rumors began to fly, with potential outcomes including the shutdown of the network and a sale to Universidad San Martín de Porres. Panamericana employees met that night and declared in a resolution that they had taken control of the network and would continue normal programming.

On June 8, judges awarded Panamericana to Ernesto Schütz Freundt. Immediately, programming stopped and was replaced with Popeye cartoons while the workers were forced out to conduct an inventory of the property in the building. For another month, all commercials were replaced with footage of Peruvian landscapes until a new logo and programming were ready for air. The insolvency process ended on October 16, 2009, Panamericana's 50th anniversary, and in February 2010 Panamericana entered voluntary insolvency programs to pay off debts incurred during the judicial administration of the mid-2000s.

=== 2009-present: A new Panamericana ===
Panamericana has since seen many changes and improvements. While new programs have been launched, they have not fared well in the ratings; on the other hand, technological improvements have been made, such as the acquisition of new transmitters and equipment and the 2012 launch of an ISDB-T high definition digital television signal on RF channel 26.

2018–Present : Panamericana With the Schutz administration taking over Panamericana Television, the ratings have risen compared to the last few years. According to their viewer statistics, it is more popular than what it was in their most successful years of broadcasting. This is mainly because of Panamericana Panorama; a new news program on Sundays that receives millions of viewers.

== Logo history ==
1959-1965

1965-1970

1970-1978

1978-1979

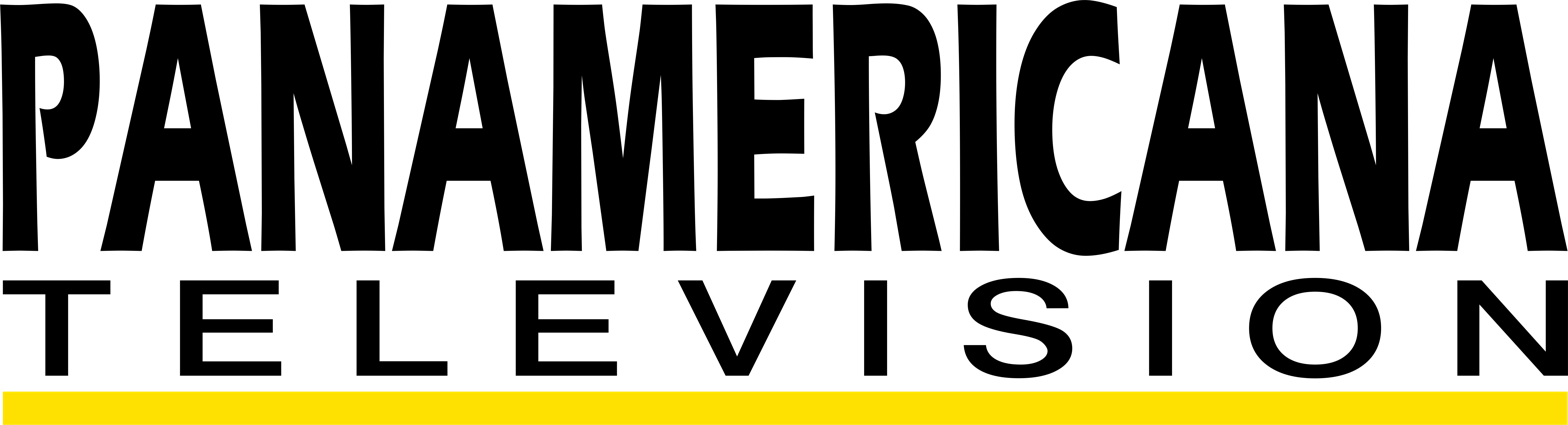
1991-1992

1992-1993

1997-2000

2000-2002

2002-2003

2003-2004

2004-June 2009

June-July 2009

July-August 2009

August-September 2009

2009-2012

2012-2014

2014-2020

2020-2021
