= Yo Soy (Peruvian TV series) =

- Created by: Endemol (now Banijay)
- Based on: My name is... from Banijay
- Directed by: Ricardo Morán
- Presented by: Cristian Rivero; Adolfo Aguilar; Karen Schwarz; Rafael Cardozo; Jesús Alzamora; Jazmín Pinedo
- Judges: Ricardo Morán; Katia Palma; Johanna San Miguel; Tony Succar; Maricarmen Marín; Fernando Armas; Carlos Banderas; Magdyel Ugaz; 2025: Ricardo Morán; Jely Reátegui; Carlos Alcántara
- Country of origin: Peru
- Original language: Spanish
- No. of seasons: 34
- No. of episodes: 1000+

Production
- Producers: Ricardo Morán; Rayo en la Botella
- Production locations: Lima, Perú
- Running time: 90-120 minutes
- Production company: Latina Televisión Compañia Latinoamericana de Radiodifusión S.A Rayo en la Botella

Original release
- Network: Latina Televisión
- Release: 9 April 2012 – 2 July 2022
- Release: 2 August 2025 – present

Related
- Yo Soy Kids

Yo Soy is a Peruvian singing imitation show. It is the Peruvian adaptation of the program "My Name Is..." and is hosted by Diana Sanchez and Franco Cabrera. It was initially produced by GV Producciones, before changing production companies to "Rayo en la Botella" in 2013. It airs on Latina TV (Channel 2) at 7:45 p.m. and is licensed by Banijay Entertainment.

The jury for the 2025 edition is made up of: producer "Ricardo Morán", singer and actress "Jely Reategui" and comedian, actor and director "Carlos "Cachín" Alcántara", during the casting stage Carlos was sometimes replaced by Mauri Stern

== Format ==
The program have three judges, who are responsible for selecting contestants based on their physical and vocal similarity to a given artist. The jury then chooses which participants remain and which leave.

The first prize is $25,000. In the last season of 2012 ("The Revenge"), the first prize was a Suzuki Grande Nomade.

== Seasons ==
| Season | Number of contestant | Duration dates | Finalists | | |
| Season | Number of contestant | Duration dates | First place | Second place | Third place |
|---|---|---|---|---|---|
| 1 | 24 | April 9, 2012 - June 8, 2012 | Ramiro Saavedra (Kurt Cobain) | Ronald Hidalgo (Juan Gabriel) | Ani Rodríguez (Amy Winehouse) |
| 2 | 45 | June 11, 2012 - August 10, 2012 | Ytalo Faijo (Joe Arroyo) | Marco Bruno (Camilo Sesto) | César Osorio Lara (Axl Rose) |
| 3 | 24 | August 13, 2012 - October 11, 2012 | Roberto Pereda (Julio Iglesias) | Richi Rodríguez (Robert Plant) | Juan Barbieri (Arturo "Zambo" Cavero) |
| 4 | 24 | October 15, 2012 - December 7, 2012 | Nano Morris (Fher Olvera) | Sebastián Landa (José Feliciano) | Francisco Chávez (Andrés Calamaro) |
| 5 | 12 | December 10, 2012 - December 21, 2012 | Ronald Hidalgo (Juan Gabriel) | Richi Rodríguez (Robert Plant) | Francisco Chávez (Andrés Calamaro) |
| 6 | 24 | April 1, 2013 - May 31, 2013 | Héctor Lingán, Roberto Lingán y José Rosas (Los Panchos) | Christian Bernal (Vicente Fernández) | Verónica Torres (Alejandra Guzmán) |
| 7 | 24 | June 3, 2013 - August 2, 2013 | Carlos Burga (José José) | Nicolás Reinaga, Fabrizio Rozas, José Luis; Rozas y Piero Rozas (The Beatles) | Edson Marchán (Tony Rosado) |
| 8 | 32 | August 5, 2013 - September 27, 2013 | Francisco Chávez (Andrés Calamaro) | César Osorio Lara (Axl Rose) | Juan Barbieri (Arturo "Zambo" Cavero) |
| 9 | 24 | February 4, 2014 - April 4, 2014 | Juan Carlos Espinoza (Chacalón) | Noelia Calle (Yuri) | Ruby Palomino (Pink) |
| 10 | 24 | April 7, 2014 - June 13, 2014 | Jefferson Tadeo (Jorge González) | Jorge Chaparro (Ricky Martin) | Cristian Briceño (José Alberto "El Canario") |
| 11 | 24 | August 4, 2014 - September 22, 2014 | Carlos Burga (José José) | Francisco Chávez (Andrés Calamaro) | Christian Bernal (Vicente Fernández) |
| 12 | 24 | March 3, 2015 - May 16, 2015 | Hugo Apaza (Ricardo Montaner) | Tony Cam (Sandro) | Ferrán Sinatra (Joe Cocker) |
| 13 | 30 | June 13, 2015 - September 26, 2015 | Carlos Farfán (Manuel Donayre) | Javier Chang (Makuko Gallardo) | Harold Gamarra (Chayanne) |
| 14 | 5 | October 31, 2015 - December 19, 2015 | Fabiola Ramos (Alejandra Guzmán) | Paolo Pastor (Beto Cuevas) | Anthony Rivera (Marc Anthony) |
| 15 | 24 | May 2, 2016 - July 16, 2016 | Jonathan Angles (Mario "Pájaro" Gómez) | Alberto Ravines (Raphael) | Ricky Quiñones (Ozuna) |
| 16 | 36 | August 22, 2016 - October 1, 2016 | Tony Cam (Sandro) | Daniel Rioja (Cristian Castro) | Alberto Ravines (Raphael) |
| 17 | 24 | October 3, 2026 - December 18, 2016 | Sebastián Molina (Ricardo Arjona) | José Eduardo Pinedo (José José) | Kely Vilcapoma (Anita Santivañez) |
| 18 | 25 | March 5, 2017 - June 3, 2017 | Carmen Castro (La India) | Miguel Ángel Ponce (Raúl Romero) | José Rubio (Leo Dan) |
| 19 | 24 | June 5, 2017 - August 26, 2017 | Nello Franco (Pedro Fernández) | Charly Cervantes (Federico Moura) | Nando de la Cruz, Giani Méndez, Letzer; Moreno and Christofer Samanamug (Skándalo) |
| 20 | 24 | August 28, 2017 - October 20, 2017 | Joselyn Barrantes (Natalia Jiménez) | Gabriela Cirilo (Ariana Grande); Iván Gutiérrez, Yván Queirolo y Carlos Raygada (Bee Gees); Jonathan Espinoza (Fher Olvera); José Farola, Freddy Quiala y Dominic Sánchez (Los 4); Walter Polastri (José Luis Perales) | |
| 21 | 24 | July 17, 2018 - October 5, 2018 | Oriana Montero (Mon Laferte) | Harold Gamarra (Emmanuel) | Raúl Gutiérrez, Paquito Portuguez and Ramses; Retto (El Gran Combo de Puerto Rico) |
| 22 | 24 | October 8, 2018 - December 14, 2018 | Joaquina Carruitero (Adele) | Jairo Tafur (Dyango) | Ricky Santos (Luis Miguel) |
| 23 | 21 | May 20, 2019 - July 19, 2019 | Jhampier Pinedo y Rosalía Timaná (Pimpinela) | Franco Acobo (Billie Joe Armstrong) | Eva María Huertas (Daniela Darcourt) |
| 24 | 24 | July 22, 2019 - October 11, 2019 | Roxana Alva (Carmencita Lara) | Davis Benavides (Gustavo Cerati) | Malena Leonardi, Alan Ortiz, Giusseppe; Rivas and Valeria Villacorta (ABBA) |
| 25 | 25 | October 14, 2019 - November 29, 2019 | Jairo Tafur (Dyango) | Fabrizio Rozas, José Luis Rozas, Fabián; Rozas y Piero Rozas (The Beatles) | Ani Rodríguez (Amy Winehouse) |
| 26 | 111 | June 13, 2020 - August 3, 2020 | Carloman Fidel (Enrique Bunbury) | Raúl Gutierrez (Gilberto Santa Rosa) | Jairo Tafur (Dyango) |
| 27 | 37 | August 4, 2020 - October 10, 2020 | Luis Hans (Pedro Infante) | Julio Cornejo (Juan Luis Guerra) | Mariano Gardella (Jon Bon Jovi) |
| 28 | 28 | October 12, 2020 - January 2, 2021 | Luis Arellano, Ricardo Infante y Miguel Laporte (Il Volo) | Abigail Márquez (Amanda Miguel) | Joseph Sanz (Celia Cruz) |
| 29 | 145 | January 4, 2021 - March 6, 2021 | Mike Bravo (Marilyn Manson) | Carlos Burga (José José) | Julio Cornejo (Juan Luis Guerra) |
| 30 | 25 | March 8, 2021 - May 14, 2021 | Noemí Ávila (Princesita Mily) | Freddy Arévalo (Luis Fonsi) | Alfredo Valente y Julio Saavedra (Dúo Dinámico) |
| 31 | 144 | November 18, 2021 - January 29, 2022 | Sebastián Landa (José Feliciano) | Ronald Hidalgo (Juan Gabriel) | Cristian Danielle - Ecuador (Ricardo Montaner) |
| 32 | 23 | March 19, 2022 - April 23, 2022 | Alberto Mejía y Danniel Reyes (Héctor Lavoe) | Marian Díaz y Fiorella Caballero (Laura Pausini) | Oriana Montero y Sharik Arévalo (Mon Laferte) |
| 33 | 30 | April 25, 2022 - July 2, 2022 | Jorge "Toño" Muñoz (Rauw Alejandro) | Emily Iturrate (Anna Carina); Jefferson Torres (Bryan Arámbulo); Harold Gamarra (Carlos Vives); Daniel Rioja (Christian Nodal); Jonathan Caro (Joe Arroyo) | |
| 34 | 24 | August 2, 2025 - October 11, 2025 | Jesús Zavaleta (Pedro Infante) | Josué Rivaldo (Raphael) | Luigui Cruz (José José) |
| 35 | 26 | October 13, 2025 - December 20, 2025 | Gabriela Villanueva (Michael Jackson) | Bruno Ramos, Eduardo Orrego y Bruno Iturrizaga (Green Day) | Melissa Ángeles (Alejandra Guzmán) |
| 36 | 27 | December 22, 2025 - March 21, 2026 | Ricardo Martín (Liam Gallagher) | Marco Hurtado (Julio Iglesias) | Fernando Sosa (Gustavo Cerati) |
| 37 | 175 | March 23, 2026 - May 30, 2026 | Josué Rivaldo (Raphael) | Jesús Zavaleta (Pedro Infante) | Fer Sosa (Gustavo Cerati) |
| 38 | 26 | August 8, 2026 - October 17, 2026 | Mr. Nik (Adrián Barilari) | Paulina Villalobos (Isabel Pantoja) | Favio Enríquez (Ricky Martin) |
| 39 | TBA | October 19, 2026 - TBA | TBA | TBA | TBA |

=== Great Celebrities ===
| Season | Number of Couples | Duration dates | Finalists | | |
| Season | Number of Couples | Duration dates | First place | Second place | Third place |
|---|---|---|---|---|---|
| 1 | 8 | February 13, 2021 | Jairo Tafur y Susan Ochoa (Dyango) | Ronald Hidalgo y Amy Gutiérrez (Juan Gabriel) | Ani Rodríguez y Shantall (Amy Winehouse) |
| 2 | 14 | March 13, 2021 - May 22, 2021 | Noelia Calle y Amy Gutiérrez (Yuri) | José Rosillo y Jean Paul Strauss (Marcello Motta) | Christian Bernal y Gaby Zambrano (Vicente Fernández) |
