= Japy Ending =

- Theatrical release poster
- Directed by: Ani Alva Helfer; Jesús Alvarez Betancourt; Hugo Shinki; John Mayta; Fernando Ruíz Odría; Sandro Ventura
- Written by: Sandro Ventura; Jesús Álvarez; Fernando Ruiz; Víctor Mendevil
- Produced by: Adolfo Aguilar; Jesus Alvarez Betancourt; Hugo Shinki; Sandro Ventura
- Starring: Pietro Sibille; Fiorella Rodríguez; Roger Del Águila; Sofía Bogani; Paloma Yerovi; Teddy Guzmán; Reynaldo Arenas; Gisela Ponce de León; Maricarmen Marín; Adolfo Aguilar
- Cinematography: Hugo Shinki; John Mayta
- Edited by: Ani Alva Helfer; Sandro Ventura
- Music by: Ricardo Núñez
- Production company: Big Bang Films
- Distributed by: BF Cineplex
- Release date: June 24, 2014
- Running time: 100 minutes
- Country: Peru
- Language: Spanish
- Box office: $479,081

Japy Ending is a 2014 Peruvian anthology comedy film written by Sandro Ventura, Jesús Álvarez, Fernando Ruiz & Víctor Mendevil and directed by 6 different directors. The film brings together several stories that occur in parallel, where extravagant characters will face the shocking news of a meteorite on an inevitable collision course against the planet.

== Synopsis ==
In a hypothetical end of the world, precisely on December 21, 2012. Several characters must accept this reality and decide what they will do during that last day, before a meteorite hits the Earth.

== Cast ==
The actors participating in this film are:

- Pietro Sibille as Bruno
- Fiorella Rodríguez as Elena
- Roger Del Águila as Gino
- Sofía Bogani as Korina
- Paloma Yerovi as Marjorie
- Teddy Guzmán as Graciela
- Reynaldo Arenas as Miguel
- Gisela Ponce de León as Elvira
- Maricarmen Marín as Lizet
- Adolfo Aguilar as Benjamín
- Óscar López Arias as Emilio
- Sandra Vergara as Carla
- Natalia Cárdenas as Georgette
- Nicolás Fantinato as Santiago
- Pablo Saldarriaga as Moño
- Carolina Cano as Romina
- Andrés Salas as Pepe
- Mon Laferte as Eli
- Junior Silva as Father René
- Katia Palma as Dayana
- Karen Schwarz as Montserrat
- Luis Baca as Mateo
- Manuela Camacho as Mara
- Claudia Ruíz as Olivia
- Fernando Armas as Man with Rabbit Ears

== Production ==
Principal photography began on February 8, 2013 and ended in March of the same year.

== Release ==
Its premiere was scheduled for January 2014, but it was delayed and was released on July 24, 2014, in Peruvian theaters.

== Reception ==
Japy Ending attracted 70,000 viewers a week after its premiere. It surpassed 100,000 viewers by the end of its second week of release. In its entire theatrical run, the film drew 128,000 viewers and grossed $479,081.
