= La peor de mis bodas =

- Theatrical release poster
- Directed by: Adolfo Aguilar
- Written by: Sandro Ventura; Roberto Valdivieso; Percy Wong
- Produced by: Adolfo Aguilar; Israel Carmen; John Mayta; Fiorella Rodriguez; Macarena Ventura; Sandro Ventura
- Starring: Maricarmen Marín; Gabriel Soto
- Cinematography: Gustavo Ríos
- Edited by: Sandro Ventura
- Music by: Renzo Bravo
- Production company: Big Bang Films
- Distributed by: Big Bang Films
- Release date: September 22, 2016
- Running time: 95 minutes
- Country: Peru
- Language: Spanish

La peor de mis bodas (lit. 'The worst of my weddings') is a 2016 Peruvian comedy film directed by Adolfo Aguilar (in his directorial debut) and written by Sandro Ventura, Roberto Valdivieso & Percy Wong. It stars Maricarmen Marín and Gabriel Soto. It premiered on September 22, 2016, in Peruvian theaters.

== Synopsis ==
Maricielo is a mischievous vendor of party supplies who is tempted by the son of a millionaire to pose as the best wedding planner in Lima and thus ruin his father's marriage with his foolish bride.

== Cast ==
The actors participating in this film are:

- Maricarmen Marín as Maricielo
- Gabriel Soto as Salvador
- Ricky Tosso as Pablo
- Atilia Boschetti as Úrsula
- Emanuel Soriano as Fernando
- Alexandra Graña as Rosaura
- Carlos Casella as Juancito
- Darlene Rosas as Catalina
- Jesús Alzamora as José Alonso
- Thiago Vernal as Ignacio
- María Paz Gonzáles-Vigil as Mariluz
- Analú Polanco as Silvita
- Alicia Mercado as Estrellita

== Reception ==
La peor de mis bodas exceed 30,000 viewers on the first day of its theatrical release. In its first weekend in theaters, the film attracted 150,000 viewers. The film drew 396,500 viewers in its second weekend. In its third weekend, the film drew over 558,000 viewers. The film became the third most viewed Peruvian film of 2016 with 722,106 viewers.

== Sequels ==
Following the immediate success of the film, it was confirmed that a sequel titled La peor de mis bodas 2 (The worst of my weddings 2) would be made. It premiered on January 1, 2019, in Peruvian theaters. Quickly, the making of a third part was confirmed to be filming in March 2022. La peor de mis bodas 3 premiered on August 27, 2023 in Peruvian theaters.
