= Una Navidad en Verano =

- Theatrical release poster
- Directed by: Ricardo Morán
- Written by: Gonzalo Rodríguez Risco
- Produced by: Vanessa Aparicio; Ricardo Morán; Paulo Cesar Paredes; Ana María Roca-Rey; Diego Vives
- Starring: Maricarmen Marín; Marco Zunino
- Cinematography: Rodrigo Pulpeiro
- Edited by: Javier Becerra Heraud
- Music by: Ricardo Morán
- Production company: Rayo en la Botella
- Distributed by: Tondero Distribución (International)
- Release date: November 30, 2017
- Running time: 85 minutes
- Country: Peru
- Language: Spanish

Una Navidad en Verano (lit. 'A Christmas in Summer') is a 2017 Peruvian Christmas musical comedy film directed by Ricardo Morán (in his directorial debut) and written by Gonzalo Rodríguez Risco. Starring Maricarmen Marin and Marco Zunino.

== Synopsis ==
It tells the story of Daniela, a charismatic and fighting woman in charge of four children. A few days before Christmas, an unexpected event will make everyone understand that the most important thing is to be together.

== Cast ==
The actors participating in this film are:

- Maricarmen Marín as Daniela
- Marco Zunino as Alberto
- Armando Machuca as Armando
- Ray del Castillo
- Kareem Pizarro
- Aitana Osorio
- Raúl Huamán

== Production ==
Principal photography for the film began on June 5, 2017 and ended on July 9 of the same year.

== Release ==
Una Navidad en Verano premiered on November 30, 2017, in Peruvian theaters with a version with subtitles and sign language for people with hearing limitations.
