= Frecuencia Latina bombing =

Terrorist attack in Lima, Peru

- Part of the internal conflict in Peru
- Aftermath of the attack
- Location: Jesús María, Lima, Peru
- Date: 5 June 1992; 34 years ago 0:02 a.m. (EDT)
- Target: Frecuencia 2 building
- Attack type: Car bombing; Communist terrorism
- Deaths: 3
- Injuries: 20
- Perpetrator: Shining Path

On June 5, 1992, the Shining Path detonated a 600-kilogram (1,300 lb) car bomb at the intersection of San Felipe and Olavegoya avenues, in Jesús María, a district in central Lima, Peru. The attack targeted the headquarters of Frecuencia 2, a television channel based in the district since 1989. It marked a new era in the conflict, as it was the first time that a media entity had been openly attacked by the group.

The attack used a truck belonging to the Peruvian Naval Infantry which was stolen approximately two hours prior, which was then rigged with a payload of ammonium nitrate and fuel oil mixed with dynamite. The truck was brought to the aforementioned television station and, following a shootout, detonated at 0:02 a.m. PET (EDT). The attack killed producer Alejandro Pérez Mesía and guards Javier Requis Arellano and Teddy Hidalgo Ruiz, injuring 20 others. The station's complex was destroyed, as were several other buildings and vehicles.

== Background ==
Frecuencia 2 (known as Latina Televisión since 2014) is a Peruvian free-to-air television channel. The channel reported on the effects of the then-ongoing conflict in the country's interior, interviewing locals and reporting on the government campaign against the ongoing insurgency. The channel was originally based in San Antonio, a neighbourhood of Miraflores, moving in 1989 to a new location built as a traditional residential manor 3 decades before at San Felipe Avenue, in Jesús María. Prior to the attack, the channel had been operating in the fortified building for about a year and a half, and an auditorium had been recently inaugurated next to the former house. The attack aimed to serve as a message to the country's press.

== Attack ==
On June 4, two hours prior to the attack, a truck belonging to the Peruvian Navy was stolen at La Punta District by two women and three men armed with pistols. It was then rigged with 600 kilograms (1,300 lb) of ammonium nitrate and fuel oil mixed with dynamite. At around midnight, the stolen truck was taken to Olavegoya avenue, where its steering wheel was tied to the driver's seat and a stone was placed on the pedal. The vehicle was abandoned by its occupants, drifting through Olavegoya avenue towards the television station.

Once the station's security detail noticed the vehicle, they began firing towards it, also notifying the building's occupants. The truck continued to drift until it hit the building's security gate and exploded. The explosion reached two members of 90 segundos, the station's newscast: director Ricardo Müller Montani and producer Alejandro Pérez Mesía, also known as "Chacho." The former was relatively unharmed, while the latter was found lifeless under a hanging lamp that fallen on top of him. Javier Linares Chumpitaz, the newscast's editor-in-chief, hid behind a tree with a colleage, surviving the attack. Also killed in the attack were guards Javier Requis Arellano and Teddy Hidalgo Ruiz, who immediately rushed to warn the building's occupants. Over 20 people were also injured.

The building was severely damaged and had to be demolished. Also severely damaged were all neighbouring buildings in a 600-square-metre (6,500 sq ft) radius, such as those of the School of Architecture, the Centro Español de Perú, and the Grupo Santillana. The truck left a crater 2 metres (6 ft 7 in) in depth and 6 metres (20 ft) in diameter, and destroyed the building's outer wall, as well as the station's vehicles. The Shining Path claimed responsibility through flyers dropped in Villa El Salvador and San Juan de Lurigancho.

== Impact ==
The channel resumed its broadcast 12 hours later, amid an outpouring of support and solidarity, both at a local and international level. Maritere Braschi, who briefly spoke to Pérez prior to the attack, was one of two newscasters for this broadcast. The building was demolished in the following year, and replaced by the new premises that continue to operate to date. In the aftermath of the attack, one of the few rooms to survive was made into a newsroom named after Pérez, after which the channel was temporarily reorganised in small provisional buildings. Cleanup crews were made up of volunteers, with vehicles from several institutions, such as the Metropolitan Municipality of Lima.

Pérez was survived by his wife, Rosario Tola. Müller, whose car was destroyed in the blast, died two years later, on July 19, 1994.

In 2002, the channel's owner, Baruch Ivcher, testified before the Truth and Reconciliation Commission at the auditorium of the Centro Cívico de Lima. He claimed that witnesses at the School of Architecture recalled seeing the truck used in the attack parked at the same site the day before. He alleged that the Navy and the Defence Ministry would not respond clearly to his requests for information on the truck's theft, also noting that the Shining Path had been infiltrated by agents of the National Intelligence Service. According to Ivcher, the claim was never investigated.

== See also ==
- Tarata bombing
- Assassination of María Elena Moyano
