= El Buen Pedro =

- Theatrical release poster
- Directed by: Sandro Ventura
- Written by: Sandro Ventura
- Produced by: Jesus Alvarez Betancourt; Hugo Shinki; Sandro Ventura
- Starring: Miguel Torres-Böhl
- Cinematography: Hugo Shinki
- Edited by: Sandro Ventura
- Music by: Ricardo Núñez
- Production company: Big Bang Films
- Distributed by: Big Bang Films
- Release date: September 20, 2012
- Running time: 100 minutes
- Country: Peru
- Language: Spanish

El Buen Pedro (lit. 'The Good Pedro') is a 2012 Peruvian thriller drama film written and directed by Sandro Ventura. Starring Miguel Torres-Böhl. It premiered on September 20, 2012, in Peruvian theaters.

== Synopsis ==
Pedro is a calm, hermetic and absolutely orderly guy. He gets up early to go to work serving the public. In addition, he likes to cook, listen to music and go out to kill at 2 in the morning. Gabriel Barba is the policeman in charge of searching for this unstoppable murderer. However, he has problems that distract him: he is in love with Ángela, a prostitute with whom he lives and whom he cannot touch, because she, in revenge for not fulfilling everything she promised him, does not allow it. A dark and intense story, where satisfaction becomes the reason for violent events, which occur in a universe plagued by characters trapped in their own labyrinth.

== Cast ==
The actors participating in this film are:

- Miguel Torres-Bohl as Pedro
- Roger del Águila as Gabriel Barba
- Natalia Salas as Ángela
- Adolfo Aguilar as Iván
- Carlos Álvarez as Commander
- Adriana Quevedo as Milagros
- Laura Del Busto as Luisa
- Sofía Bogani as Cinthya
- Catherine Díaz as Verónica
- Lizeth Campano as Carla
- Mayra Goñi as Susan
- Valeria Bringas as Mary
- Miguel Vargas as Hernán
- Jazmín Pinedo as Kelly
- Maya Alvarado as Lola

== Reception ==
El Buen Pedro drew 28,116 viewers in its entire theatrical run.
