= La peor de mis bodas 3 =

- Theatrical release poster
- Directed by: Adolfo Aguilar
- Written by: Ítalo Carrera; Sandro Ventura
- Produced by: Adolfo Aguilar; Israel Carmen; Carlos Peñaranda; Ivy Suarez; Sandro Ventura; Maria Luz Zucchella
- Starring: Maricarmen Marín; Gabriel Soto; Laura Zapata
- Cinematography: Hugo Shinki
- Edited by: Sandro Ventura
- Music by: Santiago León
- Production companies: Big Bang Films; Stardust Media
- Distributed by: Stardust Media
- Release date: July 27, 2023
- Running time: 100 minutes
- Country: Peru
- Language: Spanish

La peor de mis bodas 3 (lit. 'The worst of my weddings 3') is a 2023 Peruvian comedy film directed by Adolfo Aguilar and written by Ítalo Carrera & Sandro Ventura. It is the third part of La peor de mis bodas (2016) and La peor de mis bodas 2 (2019). It stars once again Maricarmen Marín and Gabriel Soto accompanied by Laura Zapata, Ismael La Rosa, Milett Figueroa, Thiago Vernal, Carlos Casella, Francisco Cabrera, Canela China and Fernando Bakovic. It premiered on August 27, 2023, in Peruvian theaters.

== Synopsis ==
Salvador and Maricielo have just finished moving in, everything seems to be going great. Although, the arrival of Leonor, Salvador's mother, will turn things upside down again, as she brings Bruno Díaz Conde, her boyfriend almost 20 years her junior. This will bring to light various problems that will put the couple in trouble, such as Maricielo's desire to be a mother. While she tries to organize her mother-in-law's wedding, Salvador tries to boycott her with the help of Juancito and Fernando. Two opposing sides that will soon face big decisions.

== Cast ==
The actors participating in this film are:

- Maricarmen Marín as Maricielo
- Gabriel Soto as Salvador
- Laura Zapata as Dona Leonor
- Ismael La Rosa as Bruno Díaz Conde
- Milett Figueroa as Catalina
- Carlos Casella as Juancito
- Thiago Vernal as Ignacio
- Carlos Palma as Fernando
- Francisco Cabrera as Rolando
- Canela China as Tania
- Fernando Bakovic as Don Emiliano

== Production ==
At the end of August 2021, Adolfo Aguilar announced the production of a third part of the La peor de mis bodas franchise.

=== Filming ===
Principal photography was planned to begin filming in March 2022, but was delayed due to Maricamen Marín's pregnancy. In the end, filming began on January 13, 2023, in Lima, Callao, La Punta among more locations in Peru.
