= ¿Por Qué Te Fuiste? =

Single by Maricarmen Marín
- Released: 2 September 2018
- Genre: Cumbia
- Length: 3:05
- Label: Independent
- Songwriters: Maricarmen Marín; Patrick Ingunza
- Producers: Maricarmen Marín; Patrick Romantik

Maricarmen Marín singles chronology
"Por Fin Soy Libre" (2017)	"¿Por Qué Te Fuiste?" (2018)	"Mi Suegra" (2018)

Music video
- "¿Por Qué Te Fuiste?" on YouTube

"¿Por Qué Te Fuiste?" (English: "¿Why Did You Leave?") is a song by Peruvian singer Maricarmen Marín. It was released on September 2, 2018, and had airplay success throughout Latin America and Europe.

== Commercial performance ==
The song got lots airplay success throughout Latin America, mainly in Perú and Bolivia, as well as some countries in Europe. Due to the song's success, Maricarmen set out on her Por Qué Te Fuiste Tour through the continent of America and Europe.

== Live performances ==
Maricarmen performed the song on several television shows to promote it. One of her most notable performances was in the show Yo Soy where she was also a judge.

== Music video ==
The music video was released on the same day as the song on Maricarmen's official YouTube channel and reached over 100,000 views on its first day. In the video, Maricarmen is at a party with her friends and family singing the song with them. While they sing, some people are having memories of loved ones who aren't with them anymore. The video has over 100 million views, making it Maricarmen's most viewed video and the first video by a Peruvian female singer to achieve that. Some parts of the video are shown as flashbacks in Maricarmen's video for her 2019 hit song La Copita, which is a sequel to ¿Por Qué Te Fuiste?.

== Charts ==
=== Weekly charts ===
Chart (2018–2019)	Position
Bolivia (Monitor Latino)	9
Bolivia Latino (Monitor Latino)	6
Perú (Monitor Latino)	7
Perú Popular (Monitor Latino)	1
Perú Tropical (Monitor Latino)	2

Chart (2021)	Position
Perú Digital Top 1000 (UNIMPRO)	123

=== Year-end charts ===
Chart (2019)	Position
Bolivia (Monitor Latino)	26
Bolivia Latino (Monitor Latino)	22
Perú (Monitor Latino)	29
Perú Tropical (Monitor Latino)	5

Chart (2020)	Position
Bolivia (Monitor Latino)	84
Bolivia Latino (Monitor Latino)	60
Perú (Monitor Latino)	72
Perú Tropical (Monitor Latino)	23

Chart (2021)	Position
Perú Tropical (Monitor Latino)	31

== Awards and nominations ==
The song was nominated for Video of the Year and Super Q of the Year at the Premios Q De Oro in 2018.

Year	Awards Ceremony	Category	Result
2018	Premios Q De Oro	Video of the Year	Nominated
2018	Premios Q De Oro	Super Q of the Year	Nominated
