= Rosario Ponce López =

Peruvian murder suspect

Rosario Ponce López (born 6 October 1986) was a university student at the Agraria University in La Molina, Lima, Peru. On April 4, 2011, during a field trip to Colca Canyon, she and her boyfriend, Ciro Castillo Rojo got lost. She was found alive on April 13, 2011 but her boyfriend was not with her. After an intensive search, a body was found on October 16 in a deep ravine in the area where Rosario had indicated Ciro was likely to be. On October 26, 2011, the body was officially determined to be that of Ciro and that the cause of death had been severe traumatic shock due to a fall.

== Investigation ==
According to the District Attorney of Arequipa, Rosario Ponce is the prime suspect in the case and additional interviews with the DA have been scheduled. One of the facts of the case is that Ciro was walking without his sneakers at the time of the fall, which has aroused suspicions of foul play. Personnel from the Lima Branch of Homicides began searching for those sneakers on November 8, 2011.

The autopsy results indicate that Ciro did not die immediately following his fall, rather that he likely suffered for some 8 hours before death overtook him. As a result of the fall he fractured his arm, collarbone, skull and four ribs on the right side of his body. The forensic results showed that Ciro must have fallen on his own without the interference of third parties. His garments were torn, and his personal effects (scarf, cap, and lighter) were scattered, which supports this theory. If Ciro had been pushed or thrown, the lesions would have been more traumatic. "From such a height, one literally bursts," the report indicated. In a similar vein forensic experts met with District Attorney Rosario Lozada in early January to formally ratify that Ciro died "due to an accidental fall."

The final forensic report of the Ministry of the Public was released in mid-March 2012 confirming that Ciro died of a slip "due to not carrying adequate equipment for his trip through the Arequipan valley" and "the absence of lesions in other regions of the body, such as the thorax and legs, discard the hypothesis of...free fall." However the report did confirm the presence of hairs from another person or people on his jacket, T-shirt, pants, and undergarments. Hairs are being checked against the hair of 11 witnesses, including Rosario Ponce.

The director of the Peruvian Criminological and Penal Sciences Institute, Miguel Pérez Arroyo, supports this hypothesis, but says that murder must not be ruled out. "[Rosario Ponce] said that Ciro had separated from her in order to ask for help. One will have to see if this young man was clumsy or sufficiently ignorant of this type of trip. If irrationality or incoherence can be determined from what was said by the witness, Rosario, we would be speaking of criminal suspicion."

== Aftermath ==
On November 24, 2011, and at the request of the Peruvian designer Ciro Taype she debuted as a model for a charity drive to raise toys for underprivileged children in Huancavelica alongside the former Miss Peru Karen Schwarz and Angie Jibaja.

Rosario is also planning a book outlining her ordeal and indicates that she has been approached by a Colombian film producer seeking the movie rights to her story.

Reports now indicate that hackers attempting to take advantage of Rosario Ponce's growing notoriety have also launched a computer virus, posing as a news story from El Comercio entitled: "Late-breaking news: Rosario Ponce couldn't take it any more and confessed her crime." a story which the newspaper has taken pains to disavow.

On 22 April 2013 the district attorney Lozada was to have presented the three gloves found on or near Ciro's body. The existence of the third glove was key to the prosecution's case as it is assumed that a person only wears two gloves at a time. Finding a third glove was to have been proof that a second person was present with Ciro at the time of his death. However the district attorney, upon appearing at the hearing, indicated that the glove which had been found on Ciro's left hand at the time his body was hoisted out of the ravine was still in the possession of the[Public Ministry of Lima.

Upon opening the sealed bag it was revealed that there was only one glove inside and that the "third glove" was actually the inner lining of the second glove, which had come out and had been mistaken for a glove by rescue workers due to the frost covering it. This error having been corrected and it now being a matter of record that only two gloves were found, the Second Court of Appeals again declared unfounded the charges against Rosario apparently with the intention of dismissing the case. Gonzalo Bellido, the attorney of the accused, assured that the indications used by the district attorney are insufficient to accuse his client of second degree murder. Nevertheless, the appeals court clarified that the district attorney's investigation had not yet finished. Upon hearing this, the mother of the accused, Maria del Carmen Lopez, indicated she would resort to the Supreme Court to insist that the investigation should be closed.

By 15 May 2013 the District Attorney Lozada must announce the archival of the case or present a new accusation for murder against Rosario. On 27 July 2013 Maria del Rosario Lozada turned in the final requirement to the Judge presiding over the case. The key element of the report is believed to be the physical report prepared by Alcides Agustín López Revilla, which concluded that: the form in which Ciro fell "reduces the probability that anyone pushed him." It is believed that the case against Rosario will soon be archived without formal charges being filed against her

== Personal life ==
In September 2015 she married Victor Cabrera, the son of her lawyer

== Sources ==
- Sobreseimiento, Caso Ciro Castillo - Resolucion 05 2013-Juzgado de Chivay-Arequipa- Juez Giancarlo Torreblanca
