= La peor de mis bodas 2 =

- Theatrical release poster
- Directed by: Adolfo Aguilar
- Written by: Italo Carrera; Pablo Del Teso; Roberto Valdivieso; Sandro Ventura
- Produced by: Ani Alva Helfer; Israel Carmen; Miki Ivcher; Sandro Ventura
- Starring: Maricarmen Marín; Gabriel Soto
- Cinematography: Hugo Shinki
- Edited by: Chemo Loli
- Music by: Santiago León
- Production company: Big Bang Films
- Distributed by: Big Bang Films
- Release date: January 1, 2019
- Running time: 100 minutes
- Country: Peru
- Language: Spanish

La peor de mis bodas 2 (lit. 'The worst of my weddings 2') is a 2019 Peruvian comedy film directed by Adolfo Aguilar and written by Italo Carrera, Pablo Del Teso, Roberto Valdivieso & Sandro Ventura. It is a sequel to the 2016 film La peor de mis bodas. It is once again starring Maricarmen Marín and Gabriel Soto. It premiered on January 1, 2019 in Peruvian theaters.

== Synopsis ==
Maricielo and Salvador have been married for two happy years; but the arrival of the feared mother-in-law, a renowned judge in Mexico, will involve them in more entanglements.

== Cast ==
The actors participating in this film are:

- Maricarmen Marín as Maricielo
- Gabriel Soto as Salvador
- Laura Zapata as Dona Leonor
- Carlos Casella as Juancito
- Darlene Rosas as Catalina
- Thiago Vernal as Ignacio
- Attilia Boschetti as Úrsula
- Carlos Palma as Fernando
- Analú Polanco as Silvia
- Francisco Cabrera as Rolando
- Sergio Galliani as Rubén
- Rodolfo Carrión as Hotel Guardian

== Production ==
The filming of the film was scheduled to begin in mid-2017, but was delayed. In mid-July 2018, the filming of the film began.

== Reception ==
It summoned more than 200,000 spectators in just two weeks.

== Sequel ==
At the end of August 2021, Adolfo Aguilar announced that a third part would be made entitled La peor de mis bodas 3 (The worst of my weddings 3). It premiered on August 27, 2023 in Peruvian theaters.
