= Juventud (TV series) =

- Genre: Telenovela
- Created by: Guillermo Diazayas
- Directed by: Kenia Pérez
- Starring: Laura Zapata; Otto Sirgo
- Country of origin: Mexico
- Original language: Spanish
- No. of episodes: 20

Production
- Executive producer: Kenia Pérez
- Running time: 30 minutes

Original release
- Network: Canal de las Estrellas
- Release: 1980

Juventud (English title: Youth) is a Mexican telenovela produced by Kenia Pérez for Televisa in 1980.

== Cast ==
- Laura Zapata as Modesta
- María Fernanda as Miriam
- Gloria Mayo as Sofia
- Otto Sirgo as Rafael
- Carmen Montejo as Dona Cuca
- Carlos Monden
- Fernando Balzaretti
- Leonardo Daniel as Pablo
- Irma Dorantes
- Graciela Doring
- Blanca Torres
- Julia Marichal
- María Montejo
