= Con alma de tango =

Argentine television series

Con alma de tango is a 1994–95 Argentine television series featuring tango dancing. The series aired on Canal 9, premiering on 24 October 1994. It stars Gerardo Romano, Luisa Kuliok, Ricardo Dupont, Osvaldo Guidi, and Estela Molly. Veteran actress Amelia Bence also had a role in the series.
