= Ricardo Morán (director) =

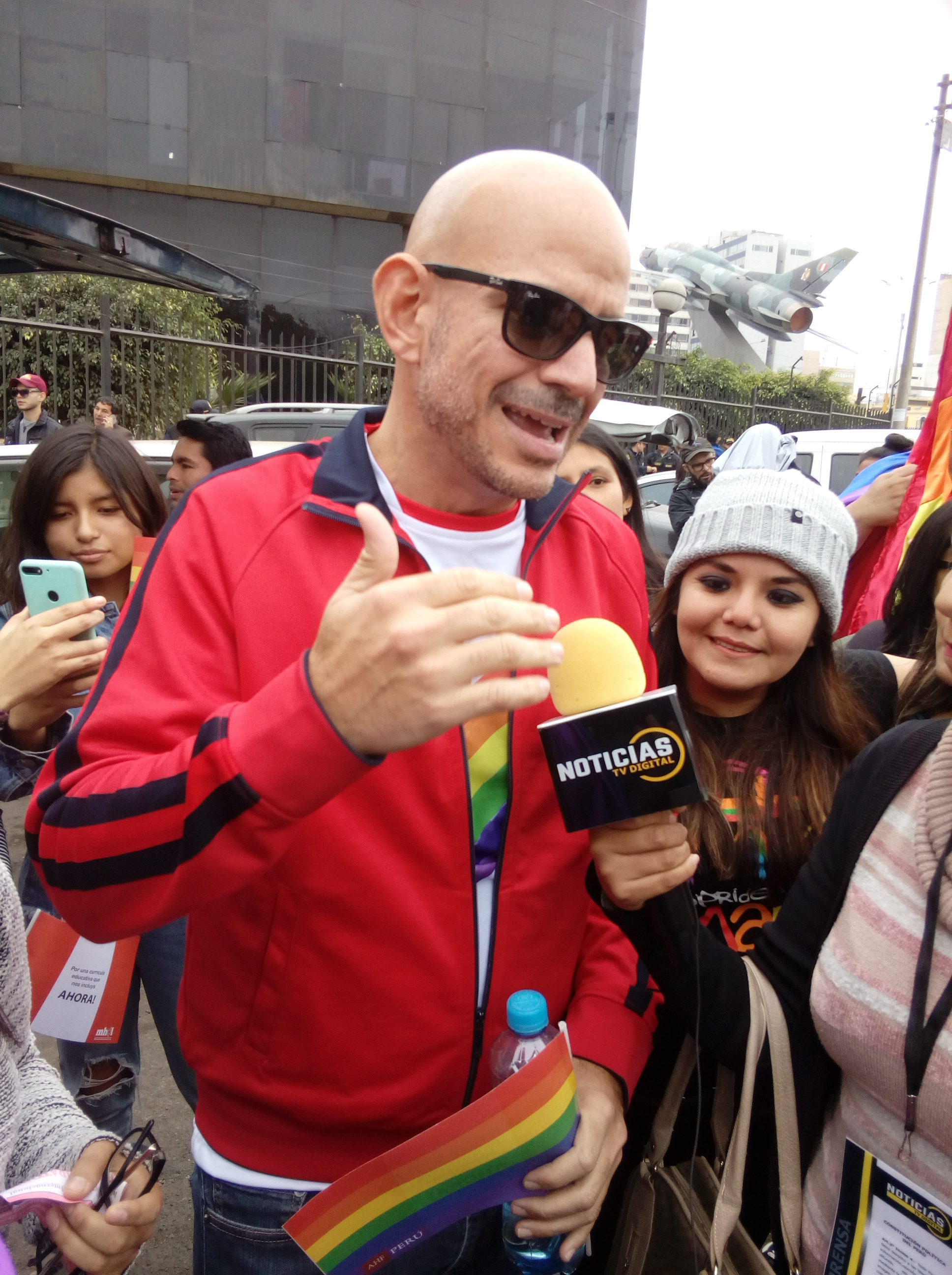
- Born: Ricardo Morán Vargas; 17 March 1974 (age 52); Lima, Peru
- Occupations: Television and stage producer and director
- Years active: 1999–present

Ricardo Morán Vargas (born 17 March 1974) is a Peruvian television and stage producer and director.

== Life and career ==
Moran was born in 1974, studied at the Colegio de la Inmaculada where he showed his artistic aptitude by winning the “Floral Games” in high school every year, then he joined at the University of Lima to study Communications, but left it later. He studied acting with Roberto Ángeles and then began working in theater production.

Morán debuts in televisión as presenter of Mad Science, TV program winner of ANDA (National Association of Advertisers) as Best Peruvian television program in 2002 and the Prize INTE (Latin American Academy of Arts and Sciences Television) for Best children's Programme 2003 Ibero America.

In 1999 he directed the play Tus amigos nunca te harían daño. In 2005 he directed Hedwig and La pulgada furiosa in the Teatro Británico, starring Vanessa Saba and Giovanni Ciccia. Along with David Carrillo co-directed the show Recontra Hamlet in the theater room Preludio in 2006 and their replacements in the Teatro Británico (2007), the Auditorium of the Municipality of San Isidro (2008) and the Teatro Julieta (2008). He also produced the shows British Opera Circus, The Kosh and Union Dance Company, for The British Council.

In March 2007, beginning his first season humorous monologue El mundo según Morán. In 2008 released Los números seis in the Teatro Británico. In 2009, the comedy premiered Esta obra es un desastre at the Teatro Mario Vargas Llosa. At the same time, exercised overall production of the program El otro show on América Televisión. Moran co-directed Más mezclados (2009) together with Vania Masías in the Theatre of the Municipality of Callao. In 2010, he adapted and directed the play La reina de belleza de Leenane in the Teatro Británico. The same year he directed El país de Carlín in Teatro Peruano Japonés and the children's show ¡Grántico, pálmani, zum!, under the twentieth anniversary of Nubeluz.

In 2011 he produced El último pasajero on Frecuencia Latina. This TV game show won the Premio a la excelencia ANDA in 2012 as Best TV program of 2011. In theater, he directed the musical Casi Normal (Next to Normal) presented at the Teatro Marsano, and then ¿Por qué no somos pareja? at the Teatro Luigi Pirandello.

In 2012 he produced and participated as a jury member of the singing and characterization reality show Yo Soy on Frecuencia Latina.

Then Morán left "GV Producciones" to create his own production "Rayo en la botella", with which will be producing two programs for 2013.

The first program to be released in summer 2013 was the Peruvian version of Rojo Fama Contrafama, on 7 January. The program will be succeeded for a new season of Yo Soy.

Moran produced the scientific exposure El túnel de la ciencia thanks to an agreement with Max Planck Society- for the Pontifical Catholic University of Peru, during April–June 2013

Moran also return to the theater as a director of the play 12 hombres en pugna, on the Teatro La Plaza.

== Professional credits ==
=== Producer/director ===
==== Television ====
- Mad Science (2001-2006)
- El otro show (2009)
- El último pasajero (2011)
- Yo Soy (2012—present) Also judge.
- Rojo Fama Contrafama (2013)
- Ponte Play (2013)

==== Theatre ====
- Tus amigos nunca te harían daño (1999)
- Hedwig y La pulgada furiosa (2005)
- Recontra Hamlet (2006-2008)
- Los número seis (2008)
- Esta obra es un Desastre (2009)
- Mas mezclados (2009)
- La reina de belleza (2010)
- El País de Carlín (2010)
- ¡Grántico, pálmani, zum! (2010)
- Casi normal (Next to Normal) (2011)
- ¿Por qué no somos pareja? (2011-2012)
- 12 hombres en pugna (2013)

=== Presenter/monologist ===
- Mad Science (2001-2007)
- El Mundo según Morán (2007) Theatre Monologue.

== Awards and nominations ==
Year	Award	Category	Work nominee	Result
2002	Premio a la excelencia ANDA	Best TV program	Mad Science	Won
2003	Premio INTE	Best Ibero American children's program	Mad Science	Won
2011	Premios Luces de El Comercio	Best TV game show	El último pasajero	Nominated
2011	Premios Luces de El Comercio	Best play	Casi normal (Next to Normal)	Nominated
2012	Premio a la excelencia ANDA	Best TV program	El último pasajero	Won
2012	Premios Luces de El Comercio	Star of the year	Himself	Won
2012	Premios Luces de El Comercio	Best TV game show	Yo Soy	Won
