= Luisa Kuliok =

Argentine actress

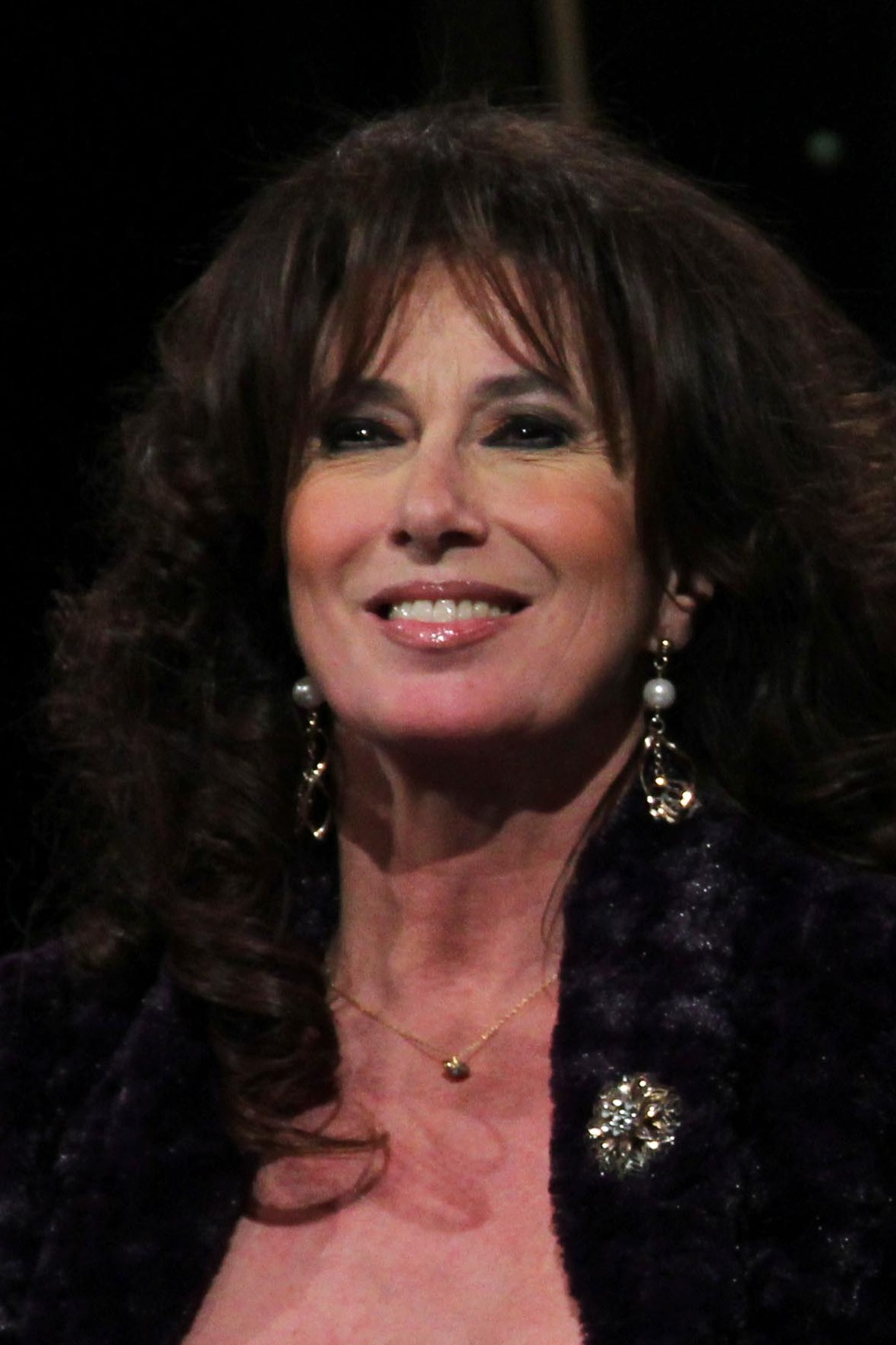
- Born: Luisa Matilde Kullock; 20 March 1954 (age 72); Buenos Aires, Argentina
- Occupation: actress
- Years active: 1968-present

Luisa Kuliok (b. Buenos Aires, 20 March 1954) is an Argentine actress of theater, film and television.

== Career ==
Kuliok was born in Buenos Aires to Rubén Kullock, electric engineer by profession. From the age of five, she studied acting and did her first play in a school production when the lead was sick. Later, she studied with Agustín Alezzo and in 1976, the same year she married, she had her professional debut. Kuliok is often credited as being the first international Argentine telenovela star. Her work in La extraña dama in 1989 was shown, became a hit in Italy and opened doors for the Argentine industry to expand into new markets. It also led to her being offered a role in Más allá del horizonte (Beyond the Horizon) replacing Gina Lollobrigida. Kuliok worked primarily in television and telenovelas until 1994. The economic crisis that occurred in the ten years between 1994 and 2004 caused her to branch out into other entertainment venues. In 2006, she was nominated for an ACE Award for her role in the theater production of Del Antiguo Oriente and in 2010, she was nominated for her performance in El alma inmoral.

== Filmography ==
=== Films ===
- 1977: Saverio el cruel
- 1982: Esto es vida
- 1987: Revancha de un amigo
- 2001: Ciudad del sol
- 2012: Amor a mares
- 2014: Death in Buenos Aires
- 2015: Primavera

=== Television ===
- 1968: Hay que matar a Drácula
- 1978: Renato
- 1979: Drácula
- 1979: Una escalera al cielo
- 1980: Los hermanos Torterolo
- 1982: Teatro de humor Episode: "Su desconsolada esposa"
- 1982: Gracias Doctor
- 1982: Un hombre como vos
- 1982: Amor Gitano
- 1982: Juan sin nombre
- 1982: Ciclo Unitario
- 1984: Amo y señor
- 1986: El infiel
- 1986: Venganza de mujer
- 1987: Como la hiedra
- 1989: La extraña dama
- 1991: Renzo e Lucia
- 1991 - 1992: Cosecharás tu siembra
- 1992: La donna del mistero 2
- 1992: Soy Gina
- 1993: Milagros
- 1994: Senza peccato
- 1994: Más allá del horizonte
- 1994: Con alma de tango
- 2000: Tiempo final - Episode: "Infieles"
- 2001: Los médicos
- 2002: Ciudad de pobres corazones
- 2008: Mujeres de nadie
- 2008: Mujeres Asesinas 4 - Chapter 3: "Marta, manipuladora"
- 2013: Solamente vos

== Live performances ==
=== Theater ===
- 1976: Tiempo de vivir
- 1976: Despertar de primavera
- 1978: Nuestro pueblo
- 1979: La visita que no tocó el timbre
- 1983: Los japoneses no esperan
- 1985: Comedia romántica
- 1996: La fierecilla domada
- 1997: Dos damas indignas
- 1998: Dos damas indignas
- 1999: Dos damas indignas
- 2001: Che madame
- 2002: Sabor a Freud
- 2003: La mesita de luz
- 2004: Porteñas
- 2004: La traiciòn del recuerdo
- 2005: Porteñas
- 2005: La mesita de luz
- 2006: El Collar de la Paloma
- 2007: El Collar de la Paloma
- 2008: El Collar de la Paloma
- 2009: El hombre inesperado
- 2010: El Alma Inmoral
- 2011: Hamlet
- 2014: Familia de mujeres
- 2015: Las obreras
- 2024: Brujas
