= 2022 FIFA World Cup broadcasting rights =

The 2022 FIFA World Cup was an association football tournament took place in November and December 2022 involved 32 men's national teams from nations affiliated to the International Federation of Association Football (FIFA). The tournament was broadcast all over the world.

== Host broadcaster ==
As with all FIFA World Cup matches since the 2002 edition, the production of the 'world television feed' was by Host Broadcast Services (HBS), part of Infront Sports & Media. Matches were captured in Ultra-high-definition (UHD) and HLG High-dynamic-range (HDR), with 5.1 surround sound. The 'world feed' was then used by rights holding broadcasters around the world.

== Broadcasters ==
Territory	Rights holder(s)	Ref.
Afghanistan	ATN	
Albania	RTSH	
Angola	TPA; TV Girassol	
Argentina	TVP; TyC Sports; DSports	
Armenia	AMPTV	
Aruba	Telearuba 13	
Australia	SBS	
Austria	ORF; ServusTV	
Azerbaijan	İTV; CBC Sport	
Bangladesh	BTV; T Sports; GTV; Toffee	
Belgium	RTBF; VRT	
Benin	ORTB	
Bolivia	Bolivia TV; Red Uno; Unitel	
Bosnia and Herzegovina	BHRT	
Botswana	BTV	
Bulgaria	BNT; Nova	
Brazil	Grupo Globo; CazéTV; Grupo Bandeirantes	
Brunei	Astro	
Burkina Faso	RTB	
Cambodia	CTN; CNC; MyTV	
Cameroon	CRTV	
Canada	Bell Media	
Cape Verde	RTC	
Caribbean	SportsMax; Verticast	
Cayman Islands	Logic	
Central Asia	Saran Media	
Chile	Chilevisión; Canal 13	
China	CCTV; Douyin; Migu	
Colombia	Caracol Televisión; RCN Televisión	
Congo	Télé Congo	
Costa Rica	Teletica	
Croatia	HRT	
Cuba	ICRT	
Curaçao	TV Direct 13	
Cyprus	CyBC	
Czech Republic	ČT; TV Nova	
Denmark	DR; TV 2	
Dominican Republic	CDN 37	
Democratic Republic of Congo	RTNC	
East Timor	ETO TELCO	
Ecuador	Teleamazonas	
El Salvador	TCS	
Estonia	ERR	
Eswatini	Eswatini TV	
Ethiopia	EBC	
Europe	EBU	
Fiji	FBC	
France	TF1; beIN Sports	
Finland	Yle; MTV3	
Gabon	RTG	
Gambia	GRTS	
Ghana	GBC	
Georgia	GPB	
Germany	ARD; ZDF; Magenta Sport	
Greece	ANT1	
Guatemala	TV Azteca; Tigo Sports	
Guinea	RTG	
Honduras	Televicentro	
Hong Kong	PCCW	
Hungary	MTVA	
Iceland	RÚV	
Indian subcontinent	Viacom18	
Indonesia	Emtek	
Ireland	RTÉ	
Israel	IPBC	
Italy	RAI	
Ivory Coast	NCI	
Japan	Abema/TV Asahi; Fuji TV; NHK; Tokyo MX	
Kazakhstan	Qazaqstan	
Kenya	KBC	
Kosovo	RTK	
Kyrgyzstan	NTRK	
Latin America	Vrio Corp.	
Latvia	LTV	
Liechtenstein	SRG SSR	
Lithuania	LRT	
Luxembourg	RTBF; VRT	
Macau	TDM	
Madagascar	ORTM	
Malawi	MBC	
Malaysia	Astro; RTM	
Mali	ORTM	
Malta	PBS	
Mauritius	MBC	
MENA	beIN Sports; Al Kass Sports Channels	
Mexico	Sky; Televisa; TV Azteca	
Moldova	TRM	
Mongolia	Central Television	
Montenegro	RTCG	
Morocco	SNRT	
Mozambique	TV Miramar	
Myanmar	Sky Net	
Namibia	NBC	
Nepal	Media Hub	
Netherlands	NOS	
New Zealand	Prime; Sky; Stuff	
Niger	ORTN	
North Macedonia	MRT	
South Korea	SBS; KBS; MBC	
Norway	NRK; TV 2	
Nicaragua	Telefonia Celular; Televideo	
Pacific Islands	Digicel; Pacific Cooperation Broadcasting Limited	
Pakistan	A Sports (ARY Sports)	
Panama	RPC; TVN	
Papua New Guinea	NBC	
Paraguay	SNT; Telefuturo; Trece; TyC Sports; Tigo Sports	
Peru	Latina Televisión	
Philippines	TAP DMV	
Poland	TVP	
Portugal	RTP; SIC; Sport TV; TVI	
Reunion	Antenne Réunion	
Romania	TVR	
Russia	Match TV	
Rwanda	RBA	
San Marino	RAI	
São Tomé and Príncipe	TVS	
Senegal	RTS	
Serbia	RTS; Arena Sport	
Seychelles	SBC	
Sierra Leone	AYV TV	
Singapore	StarHub; MediaCorp; Singtel	
Slovakia	RTVS	
Slovenia	RTV	
South Africa	SABC	
South Korea	SBS; KBS; MBC	
Spain	RTVE; Mediapro	
Sri Lanka	MTV	
Sub-Saharan Africa	SuperSport; New World TV	
Suriname	SCCN; STVS	
Sweden	SVT; TV4	
Switzerland	SRG SSR	
Taiwan	ELTA; CTS	
Tajikistan	Varzish TV	
Tanzania	TBC	
Thailand	SAT (Note: Rights acquired by SAT and distributed to 17 local channels)	
Togo	TVT	
Trinidad and Tobago	CNC3	
Turkey	TRT	
Uganda	UBC	
Ukraine	Suspilne; MEGOGO	
United Kingdom	BBC; ITV; S4C	
United States	Fox; Telemundo	
Uruguay	ANTEL; Canal 4; Canal 10; Teledoce; TyC Sports	
Uzbekistan	MTRK	
Vanuatu	TBV; VBTC	
Venezuela	Televen	
Vietnam	VTV	
Zambia	ZNBC	
Zimbabwe	ZBC	
