= Jazmín Pinedo =

Peruvian TV host (born 1990)

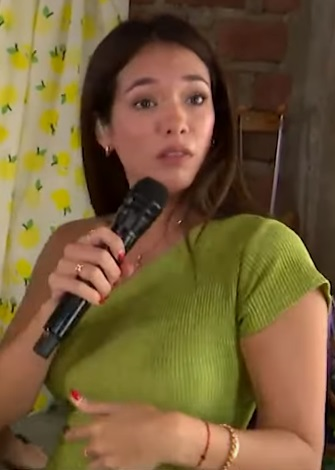
- Pinedo in 2024
- Born: Jazmín Tatiana Pinedo Chau; 19 August 1990 (age 36); Lima, Peru
- Education: Instituto Peruano de Publicidad
- Occupations: Television host, model
- Years active: 2006–present
- Television: Esto es Guerra; Mujeres al Mando; Espectáculos
- Height: 1.61 m (5 ft 3 1/2 in)
- Awards: International Big Business Latin American 2018; Best Driver Revolution 2018

Jazmín Tatiana Pinedo Chau (born Lima, Peru, 19 August 1990) is a television presenter, television personality and former model. She is a former host of the Esto es Guerra reality show on América Televisión and Espectáculos on Latina Televisión.

== Early life ==
Pinedo was born in Lima, Peru, and is the only child of Teódulo Santiago Pinedo, Commander of the National Police of Peru, and Libertad Chau.

== Artistic career ==
Pinedo started modelling for tourism agencies in Junin. In 2005, she was elected Miss Selva Central, and in 2006 she won second place in Miss Junin.

After being crowned Miss Teen Perú 2008, she signed as a model for the Very Verano of América Televisión contest program.

In 2011, Pinedo made her acting debut in the movie El Buen Pedro, which premiered in 2017 and was directed by Sandro Ventura. In Somos Néctar, she played Korina.

In 2012, she collaborated with model, Tilsa Lozano.

In 2013, she entered the reality show Esto es Guerra, and retired in 2015 when she became pregnant. That same year, she made her debut as a presenter in the contest show Combate, with actors Renzo Schuller and Gian Piero Díaz in ATV. In 2016, Pinedo joined Latina Televisión in Espectáculos, succeeding Karen Schwarz. Shortly thereafter, she co-hosted Los Reyes del Playback with Jesús Alzamora and Cristian Rivero. She also presented the talent show Yo Soy.

In 2018, she traveled to Italy to work for the Bata shoe brand, and joined the cast of the telenovela Torbellino, 20 Years Later, playing Miriam Saavedra. She also presented El Ultimo Hincha Peruano and was a reporter in the 2018 FIFA World Cup. In September of the same year, she presented Tengo Algo Que Decirte as a substitute for lawyer and ex-dancer, Lady Guillén, who was on maternity leave. She also presented the dance show Los Cuatro Finalistas: Baile.

Pinedo released a cumbia version of the Luis Fonsi and Demi Lovato single Échame la Culpa, with singer Deyvis Orosco.

In 2019, she presented the remake of Espectáculos through the end of April, and then the morning show Mujeres la mando with Karen Schwarz and Magdyel Ugaz on Latina. She presented the show Guerra with Gianpiero Díaz on América Television until 2021, when she was replaced by Johanna San Miguel.

== Personal life ==
In 2012, Pinedo had a relationship with actor, Jesús Neyra.

In 2017, in an interview for the newspaper La República, she described herself as "hermetic" in her social relationships. In 2018, upon her return from covering the 2018 FIFA World Cup, Pinedo decided to take a work break to undergo surgical treatment and recover.

== Controversies ==
=== 2018 World Cup ===
In 2018, the manager of Latina Televisión reported that Pinedo was to travel to the World Cup to cover the event, generating criticism of her journalistic and sporting inexperience. Pinedo made it clear that she would not go to the World Cup to cover news about soccer, but to cover incidents relating to the World Cup and the Perú national soccer team.

=== Change of television network ===
In 2020, Pinedo left Latina Televisión for América Televisión to become a presenter for Esto es Guerra, generating criticism on social media networks. The controversy grew when it was discovered that her contract with Latina had not yet expired. She was sued for S/ 450,000.00 for breach of contract. Afterwards, Latina revealed Pinedo's salary, which sparked the indignation of many viewers who referred to it as a "slap in the face of poverty".

== Filmography ==
TV
Year	Title	Role	Notes
2011	Very Verano	Model	
2011	El buen Pedro	Kelly	Additional cast
2013 - 2015	Esto es guerra	Reality show contestant	7 seasons
2014	Tal como eres	Protagonist	Also producing
2015	Combate	Presenter	
2016 - 2018	Espectáculos	Presenter	
2016	Entertainment programs from Peru	Presenter	
2016	Los reyes del playback	Presenter	2 seasons
2016	Yo Soy	Presenter	
2016	Miss Peru	Presenter	With Cristian Rivero
2017	Somos Néctar	Korina	Directed by Coco Bravo
2018	El último hincha peruano	Presenter	With Cristian Rivero
2018	2018 FIFA World Cup	Reporter	Special envoy
2018	Torbellino, 20 años después	Miriam	Antagonistic role
2018	Tengo algo que decirte	Presenter	
2018	Los cuatro finalistas: Bailey	Presenter	With Cristian Rivero
2018 - 2019	Espectáculos	Presenter	
2019 - 2020	Mujeres al mando	Presenter	With Karen Schwarz and Magdyel Ugaz
2020	Esto es guerra	Presenter	With Gian Piero Díaz
2021	El gran show	Contestant	In season 23

== Awards and nominations ==
Year	Award	Category	Nominated work	Result
2018	International Big Business Latin American 2018	Mujer de Oro	Best host TV Revolution 2018	Won
