= Laura Zapata =

Mexican actress

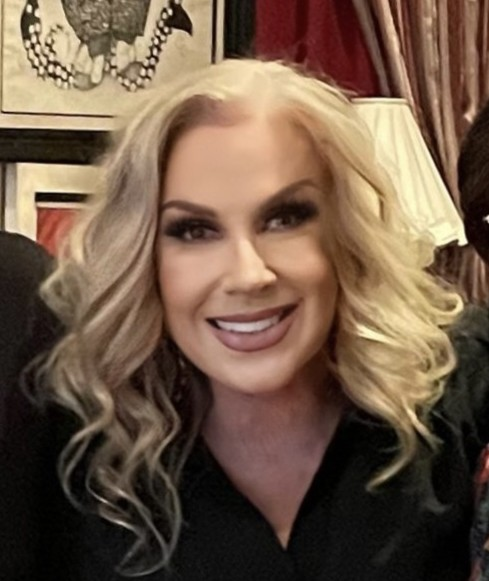
- Zapata in 2024
- Born: Laura Guadalupe Zapata Miranda; 31 July 1956 (age 70); Mexico City, Mexico
- Other name: Laura Zapata de Sodi
- Occupations: Actress; singer; dancer
- Years active: 1974–present
- Spouse: Juan Eduardo Sodi de la Tijera (divorced)
- Children: 2
- Relatives: Thalía (half-sister); Camila Sodi (niece)

Laura Guadalupe Zapata Miranda (Spanish pronunciation: [ˈlawɾa ɣwaðaˈlupe saˈpata miˈɾanda] born 31 July 1956) is a Mexican actress, singer, and dancer. She is widely known for her antagonist roles in many telenovelas.

== Life and career ==
Born in Mexico City, Zapata is the daughter of Guillermo Zapata Pérez de Utrera (a Mexican boxer, model, and businessman) and Yolanda Miranda Mange. She is the maternal sister of Thalía (also a singer and actress), Federica, Gabriela, and Ernestina Sodi. Yolanda died in 2011 and Ernestina died in 2024.

Zapata is a singer, dancer and actress of stage, film, and television. In the 1992 Televisa production Maria Mercedes, one of Thalía's first telenovelas, Zapata played the antagonist opposite Thalía.

Zapata was married to Juan Eduardo Sodi de la Tijera. She has two sons, Claudio Sodi and Patricio Sodi.

== Public image ==
=== Kidnapping incident ===
On 22 September 2002, Zapata and her sister Ernestina were kidnapped outside a theater in the Cuauhtémoc borough of Mexico City, when Zapata had just finished her performance in The House of Bernarda Alba. The criminal group known as "Los Tiras" initially demanded a ransom of US$5 million from the family, reportedly taking advantage of their younger sister Thalía's marriage to Tommy Mottola. Zapata later stated that the family negotiated the payment. Zapata was released on October 10 of that year, while Ernestina was freed later that month, ransom that Thalía paid.

In the years that followed, the family became estranged amid a series of disputes. In 2005, Zapata produced the play Cautivas, which reenacted her kidnapping. The rift deepened in 2006 following the publication of Ernestina's memoir Líbranos del mal, in which she recounted her experience, and suggesting that Zapata complicated the negotiations by revealing to the kidnappers that they were sisters, and insinuating that she may have orchestrated the kidnapping; claims that Zapata has consistently and categorically denied. Neither Thalía nor their mother Yolanda publicly defended Zapata in response to the claim.

=== Political views ===
In July 2003, following her kidnapping the previous year, Zapata registered as a candidate for federal deputy for the National Action Party (PAN) in the 26th federal electoral district of the Federal District. She was not elected and did not run for public office again.

Zapata has criticized the administrations of Andrés Manuel López Obrador and Claudia Sheinbaum, both members of Morena. Zapata has used derogatory language to describe Morena supporters, referring to them as "lackeys", "cowards" and "freeloaders", and claimed that Mexico is "a country of lazy people". In June 2025, she criticized Sheinbaum for traveling on a commercial flight to the G7 summit and referred to her using offensive terms, stating that she looked like an "indita" and "classless". Civil organizations filed complaints with the National Council to Prevent Discrimination, arguing the use of discriminatory and classist terms.

== Acting credits ==
=== Films ===
Year	Title	Role	Notes
1976	Alas doradas	Unknown role	Debut film
1978	El patrullero 777	Señorita en delegación	
1979	La guerra de los pasteles	Azucena	
1980	Nuestro juramento	Nancy	
1981	La cosecha de mujeres	Unknown role	
2002	Cuatro piernas	Sole	
2012	Marcelo	Señora Martha	
2019	La peor de mis bodas 2	Doña Leonor	
2023	La peor de mis bodas 3	Doña Leonor	

=== Television ===
Year	Title	Role	Notes
1974	Mundo de juguete	Unknown role	
1977	La venganza	Violeta	
1977	Acompáñame	Karla	
1978	Mamá campanita	Irene	
1980	Juventud	Modesta	
1984	Los años felices	Flora	
1987–88	Rosa salvaje	Dulcina Linares	Main cast
1992	María Mercedes	Malvina del Olmo	Main cast
1995	Pobre niña rica	Teresa	Main cast
1997	Esmeralda	Fátima Linares de Peñarreal	Recurring role
1998	La usurpadora	Zoraida Zapata	Guest star
1999	Rosalinda	Verónica del Castillo	Recurring role
2001	Mujer bonita	Celia	10 episodes
2001	La intrusa	Maximiliana Limantur de Roldán	Main cast
2005	Soñar no Cuesta Nada	Roberta Pérez de Lizalde	Recurring role
2008–09	Cuidado con el ángel	Onelia Montenegro Viuda de Mayer	Main cast
2010	Zacatillo, un lugar en tu corazón	Doña Miriam Solórzano de Gálvez	Main cast
2013	Todo incluido	Luz María González	
2014	The Stray Cat	Lorenza Negrete de Martínez	Main cast
2017	El Bienamado	Bruna Mendoza	
2021	MasterChef Celebrity México	Herself	Contestant (Season 1); 5th place
2022	Siempre reinas	Herself	Season 1
2023	Top Chef VIP	Herself	Contestant (season 2); runner-up
2023–24	Secretos de villanas	Herself	Main Cast (season 2–3)
2026	La casa de los famosos	Herself	Contestant (season 6)

== Discography ==
=== Studio albums ===
- Primera llamada (1981)
- Te propongo (1993)
- Cielo rojo (2018)

== Awards and nominations ==
Year	Award	Category	Nominee	Result
1988	TVyNovelas Awards	Best Female Antagonist	Rosa Salvaje	Won
1993	TVyNovelas Awards	Best Female Antagonist	María Mercedes	Won
2011	TVyNovelas Awards	Best First Actress	Zacatillo, un lugar en tu corazón	Nominated
2009	Premios People en Español	Best Female Antagonist	Cuidado con el ángel	Nominated
2010	Premios de la Agrupación de Periodistas Teatrales (APT)	Silvia Pinal Awards for Best Actress	12 Mujeres en Pugna	Won
2010	Premios de la Asociación de Cronistas y Periodistas Teatrales (ACPT)	Best Actress in Monologue	No seré feliz, pero tengo marido	Won
