= Adolfo Aguilar =

Peruvian actor, TV presenter and producer (born 1972)

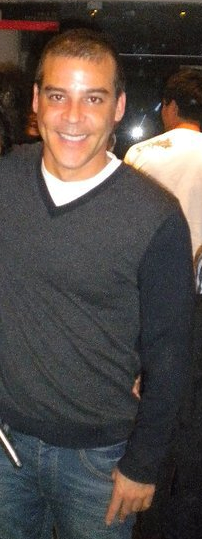
- Aguilar in 2012
- Born: Adolfo Carlos Aguilar Villanueva; 1 October 1973 (age 52); Callao, Peru
- Occupations: Actor, TV presenter and producer
- Years active: 1990–present

Adolfo Carlos Aguilar Villanueva (born 1 October 1972) is a Peruvian actor, TV presenter and producer. He is best known for hosts the programs Polizontes, Trato Hecho, El último pasajero and since 2012 Yo Soy.

== Life and career ==
He was born in 1972, in the province of Callao. He also took acting classes with Eduardo Masias (Talent Workshop Productions of America), Roberto Ángeles, Alberto Ísola, Edgar Saba and James Martin.

=== Actor ===
In 1998, he began his television career in the telenovela La rica Vicky, where he shared roles with Ismael La Rosa, Virna Flores and Alexandra Graña. Then came more productions including Gente como uno and Milagros.

In theater, Aguilar participated in the Commedia dell'arte Los chismes de las mujeres of Carlo Goldoni in 2000. He later joined the cast of the drama Criados en cautiverio directed by Carlos Acosta. Then came the comedy Salvador written by Peruvian humorist Nicolás Yerovi. Then he joined the ranks of the theater group Teatro DeAbril with whom he puts the drama Ivonne, Princesa de Borgoña of Witold Gombrowicz. That same year, he starred in the comedy Dicky & Pussy, se aman locamente was written and directed by Jaime Nieto, a work which was subsequently presented in Miami theaters. Then came Deseos Ocultos written and directed by Jaime Nieto, a work that by the nature of the character of Adolfo (Santiago), makes him a sexual icon. He then joined "Preludio Asociación Cultural" with the drama Sacco and Vanzetti of Mauricio Kartun, where did the character of Lieutenant James Stewart, thanks to a report on the cause, is in charge of locking Sacco and Vanzetti for a crime they did not commit.

In 2006, he portrayed Él in the drama Los ojos abiertos de ella, where he shared roles with the leading lady of Italian origin Attilia Boschetti. Then came the comedy El enfermo imaginario by Moliere, where he completed two totally opposite characters: Tomas Descompuestus (young and handsome boyfriend of the daughter of Argan) and Mr. Florido (dirty old apothecary of the time) directed by Ruth Escudero. Towards the end of that year, he premiered the drama Death of a Salesman by Arthur Miller in the CCPUC (cultural center Catholic University of Peru), where did the character of Uncle Ben.

In 2008, while in Miami, he performed in Quin's Day, short film participating in 48 Hour Film Festival.

He also participated in the film El Buen Pedro of Sandro Ventura, premiered in 2012.

=== Presenter ===
In 2002, Aguilar hosts Otra cosa, a magazine program on RTP channel state. During 2003–2004 was presenter/reporter Polizontes program, in Antena3 (after Plus TV). In 2005 he signed as exclusive artist ATV, where he hosts the competition program Trato Hecho. Aguilar was elected by the newspaper Peru21 as "Best Host of the Year".

In 2006, he briefly hosts the contest juvenile court program Con Buena Onda.

In August 2010, he returned to Peru, after a long stay in Miami, to compete in the dance reality show El Gran Show (second season), hosted by Gisela Valcárcel.

The Peruvian version of the TV game-show El último pasajero, premiered on 21 March 2011 on Frecuencia Latina, with Aguilar as the presenter. The show won the Premio a la excelencia ANDA in 2012 as Best TV Show of 2011.

From the 9 April 2012 is the host of the reality show Yo Soy on Frecuencia Latina. The show will be continued in 2013.

=== Producer ===
Aguilar, along with film director Sandro Ventura, Hugo Shinki and Jesus Alvarez, formed the production company Big Bang Films, which has produced El buen Pedro, released in September 2012, and Quizás mañana, released in February 2013. He is credited as executive producer. The third film producer will be Japy Ending (2014).

== Filmography ==
Year	Title	Role	Notes
Television
1994	Los de arriba y los de abajo	Photographer	Cameo
1998	La Rica Vicky	Alonso	Co-starring role
2000	Gente como uno	Alberto	
2000	Loca Visión	Himself	Presenter
2001	Milagros	Cuchi	
2002	Que buena raza		
2002	Otra cosa	Él mismo	Presenter
2003	Habla barrio	Raúl Pistola	
2003—2004	Polizontes	Himself	Presenter/Reporter
2005	Trato Hecho	Himself	Presenter
2006	Con Buena Onda	Himself	Presenter
2010	Minuto de fama	Himself	Guest host
2010	El Gran Show	Himself	Contestant
2011	El último pasajero	Himself	Presenter
2012—presente	Yo Soy	Himself	Presenter
Films
2008	Quin's Day	Hall Potts	Short film, 48 Hour Film Festival (Miami)
2012	El Buen Pedro	Iván	
2016	La peor de mis bodas	Director	
2017	La paisana Jacinta en búsqueda de Wasaberto	Director	
2017	Nadie sabe para quién trabaja	Simón Quispe	Actor
2019	La peor de mis bodas 2	Director	
2022	Mundo Gordo	Producer	
2023	La peor de mis bodas 3	Director	
2025	To Die For	Marc Anthony	Actor
