= El Gran Show season 1 =

El Gran Show
- Season 1
- Promotional poster
- Hosted by: Gisela Valcárcel; Aldo Díaz; Cristian Rivero
- Judges: Morella Petrozzi; Carlos Alcántara; Pachi Valle Riestra
- Celebrity winner: Gisela Ponce de León
- Professional winner: Rayder Vásquez
- No. of episodes: 13

Release
- Original network: América Televisión
- Original release: May 9 – August 7, 2010

Season chronology
- Next → Season 2

Season one of the 2010 edition of El Gran Show premiered on April 15, 2010.

On August 7, 2010, Gisela Ponce de León and her dreamer Rayder Vásquez became champions of the season, fulfilling the dream of helping Grace, a woman from Ica with a congenital disease. Jesús Neyra and Cindy Tello finished second, while Maricarmen Marín and Diego Alza were third.

== Cast ==
=== Couples ===
The celebrities were announced at a press conference on Thursday, April 29, while the dreamers were announced at the show's first week.

During the show, two celebrities left the competition. First it was Tilsa Lozano, who suffered an injury in the rehearsals, so Pierina Carcelén came into place from week 4. The second was Roberto Martínez, who suffered a muscle tear, so that former contestant José Luis "Puma" Carranza replaced him in week 11.

Celebrity	Notability (known for)	Dreamer	Status
Leonard León	Cumbia singer	Gisela Berríos	Eliminated 1st on May 29, 2010
Renato Rossini	Actor & model	Rosa Amelia Kameko	Eliminated 1st on June 5, 2010
Adriana Quevedo	Actress & TV host	Renzo Vallejos	Eliminated 1st on June 12, 2010
Fernando Armas	Comedian & impressionist	Jessenia Rodríguez	Eliminated 1st on July 3, 2010
Pierina Carcelén	Actress & model	Claussen Orbe	Eliminated 1st on July 10, 2010
Vanessa Jeri	Actress & model	Kenny Fajardo	Eliminated 1st on July 17, 2010
Roberto Martínez	Former football player	Katia Monroy	Eliminated 1st on July 24, 2010
Jonathan Maicelo	Professional boxer	Kiara Iglesie	Eliminated 1st on July 31, 2010
Maricarmen Marín	Singer, actress & TV host	Diego Alza	Third place on August 7, 2010
Jesús Neyra	Actor	Cindy Tello	Runner-up on August 7, 2010
Gisela Ponce de León	Actress & singer	Rayder Vásquez	Winners on August 7, 2010

=== Hosts and judges ===
Gisela Valcárcel was the host and Aldo Díaz and Cristian Rivero were the co-hosts, while Morella Petrozzi, Carlos Alcántara and Pachi Valle Riestra were the judges, along with a VIP Jury composed of members of the audience.

== Scoring charts ==
Couple	Place	1	2	3	4	5	6	7	8	9	10	11	12	13	
Couple	Place	1	2	3	4	5	6	7	8	9	10	11	12	Top 3	Top 2
Gisela & Rayder	1	32	33	32	28	32	38	38	33	41	69	65	68	—	68
Jesús & Cindy	2	28	30	26	26	26	29	31	30	38	55	61	66	58	69
Maricarmen & Diego	3	23	26	30	29	28	29	37	35	32	58	65	66	59	
Jonathan & Kiara	4	21	26	31	27	27	37	32	31	34	60	63	60		
Roberto & Katia	5	23	26	26	26	26	28	27	26	30	43	54			
Vanessa & Kenny	6	24	28	20	28	29	34	30	30	30	64				
Pierina & Claussen	7	26	24	28	32	32	30	28	19	34					
Fernando & Jessenia	8	27	21	29	27	23	28	26	28						
Adriana & Renzo	9	27	26	30	28	29									
Renato & Rosa Amelia	10	18	22	23	20										
Leonard & Gisela	11	21	21	27											

Red numbers indicate the sentenced for each week
Green numbers indicate the best steps for each week
the couple was eliminated that week
the couple was safe in the duel
the couple was safe with the faith balls
the winning couple
the runner-up couple
the third-place couple

=== Average score chart ===
This table only counts dances scored on a 40-point scale.

Rank by average	Place	Couple	Total points	Number of dances	Average
1	1	Gisela & Rayder	567	17	33.4
2	2	Jesús & Cindy	566	19	29.8
3	4	Jonathan & Kiara	444	15	29.6
4	3	Maricarmen & Diego	497	17	29.2
5	6	Vanessa & Kenny	313	11	28.6
6	9	Adriana & Renzo	140	5	28.0
7	7	Pierina & Claussen	249	9	27.7
8	8	Fernando & Jessenia	207	8	25.9
9	5	Roberto & Katia	316	13	24.3
10	11	Leonard & Gisela	69	3	23.0
11	10	Renato & Rosa Amelia	83	4	20.8

=== Highest and lowest scoring performances ===
The best and worst performances in each dance according to the judges' 40-point scale are as follows:

Dance	Highest scored dancer(s)	Highest score	Lowest scored dancer(s)	Lowest score
Pachanga	Gisela Ponce de León	32	Renato Rossini	18
Cumbia	Gisela Ponce de León	33	Leonard León	21
Latin pop	Gisela Ponce de León	32	Vanessa Jeri	20
Peruvian dances	Gisela Ponce de León	33	José Luis "El Puma" Carranza	26
Salsa	Maricarmen Marín	33	Pierina Carcelén	19
Axé	Gisela Ponce de León	32	Renato Rossini	20
Strip dance	Pierina Carcelén	32	Maricarmen Marín	27
World dances	Pierina Carcelén; Gisela Ponce de León	32	Maricarmen Marín	26
Jazz	Vanessa Jerí	31	Roberto Martínez	22
Reggaeton	Jonathan Maicelo	27	Fernando Armas	23
Disco	Jonathan Maicelo	37	Roberto Martínez	26
Merengue	Gisela Ponce de León	36	Pierina Carcelén	28
Pop	Gisela Ponce de León	39	Vanessa Jerí	30
Hip-hop	Gisela Ponce de León	34	Maricarmen Marín	27
Guaracha	Gisela Ponce de León	35	Roberto Martínez	20
Tex-mex	Gisela Ponce de León	32	Maricarmen Marín; Jonathan Maicelo	31
Jive	Gisela Ponce de León	34	Jonathan Maicelo	31
Mix	Jesús Neyra; Maricarmen Marín	30	—	—
Contemporary	Gisela Ponce de León	32	—	—
Tango	Jesús Neyra	32	—	—
Quickstep	Jesús Neyra	37	Gisela Ponce de León	36

=== Couples' highest and lowest scoring dances ===
Scores are based upon a potential 40-point maximum.

Couples	Highest scoring dance(s)	Lowest scoring dance(s)
Gisela & Rayder	Pop (39)	Strip dance (28)
Jesús & Cindy	Pop (38)	Latin pop, Salsa, Reggaeton & Guaracha (26)
Maricarmen & Diego	Merengue, Salsa & Jive (33)	Pachanga (23)
Jonathan & Kiara	Disco (37)	Salsa (21)
Roberto & Katia	Pop & Jazz (28)	Guaracha (20)
Vanessa & Kenny	Guaracha (32)	Latin pop (20)
Pierina & Claussen	Strip dance, Can-can & Pop (32)	Salsa (19)
Fernando & Jessenia	Tondero (29)	Cumbia (21)
Adriana & Renzo	Latin pop (30)	Cumbia (26)
Renato & Rosa Amelia	Latin pop (23)	Pachanga (18)
Leonard & Gisela	Huaylarsh (27)	Latin pop & Cumbia (21)

== Weekly scores ==
Individual judges' scores in the charts below (given in parentheses) are listed in this order from left to right: Morella Petrozzi, Cárlos Alcántara, Pachi Valle Riestra, VIP Jury.

=== Week 1: Pachanga ===
The couples danced the pachanga. No couple was sentenced in this week.

Running order

Couple	Scores	Dance	Music	Result
Vanessa & Kenny	24 (5, 7, 6, 6)	Pachanga	"Lo Que No Sabes Tú"—Chino & Nacho feat. El Potro	Safe
Jonathan & Kiara	21 (4, 6, 6, 5)	Pachanga	"Yo No Sé Mañana"—Luis Enrique	Safe
Renato & Rosa Amelia	18 (3, 5, 6, 4)	Pachanga	"Tú No Eres Para Mi"—Fanny Lu	Safe
Gisela & Rayder	32 (7, 8, 8, 9)	Pachanga	"Pa' Que lo Tengas Claro"—Franco & Oscarcito	Best steps
Tilsa & Claussen	26 (6, 7, 6, 7)	Pachanga	"No Juegues Con El Diablo"—Bareto	Safe
Maricarmen & Diego	23 (5, 6, 6, 6)	Pachanga	"Verano Azul"—Juan Magan	Safe
Jesús & Cindy	28 (7, 7, 7, 7)	Pachanga	"Y Si Te Digo La Verdad"—Fanny Lu	Safe
Roberto & Katia	23 (6, 6, 6, 5)	Pachanga	"Waka Waka (This Time for Africa)"—Shakira feat. Freshlyground	Safe
Adriana & Renzo	27 (6, 7, 7, 7)	Pachanga	"Llamado de Emergencia"—Daddy Yankee	Safe
Leonard & Gisela	21 (5, 6, 5, 5)	Pachanga	"Ni Rosas Ni Juguetes"—Paulina Rubio	Safe
Fernando & Jessenia	27 (6, 7, 7, 7)	Pachanga	"Mamita Ven a Cumbiar"—El Símbolo	Safe

=== Week 2: Cumbia ===
The couples danced the cumbia.

Running order

Couple	Scores	Dance	Music	Result
Jonathan & Kiara	26 (5, 7, 7, 7)	Cumbia	"Corazón"—Giuliana Rengifo	Safe
Adriana & Renzo	26 (6, 7, 6, 7)	Cumbia	"Me Gusta"—Tommy Portugal y La Pasión	Safe
Roberto & Katia	24 (5, 7, 6, 6)	Cumbia	"Puro Corazón"—Grupo 5	Safe
Maricarmen & Diego	26 (6, 7, 7, 6)	Cumbia	"Canalla"—Marisol y La Magia del Norte	Safe
Jesús & Cindy	30 (7, 8, 7, 8)	Cumbia	"Celos"—Los Villacorta	Safe
Fernando & Jessenia	21 (5, 5, 5, 6)	Cumbia	"Regresa a Mi Lado"—Hermanos Silva	Sentenced
Tilsa & Claussen	24 (6, 6, 6, 6)	Cumbia	"Motor y Motivo"—Grupo 5	Safe
Gisela & Rayder	33 (8, 8, 8, 9)	Cumbia	"La Escobita"—Marisol y La Magia Del Norte	Best steps
Leonard & Gisela	21 (4, 6, 5, 6)	Cumbia	"La Amante"—Grupo 5	Sentenced
Vanessa & Kenny	28 (7, 7, 7, 7)	Cumbia	"Agonía de Amor"—Dilbert Aguilar	Safe
Renato & Rosa Amelia	22 (4, 6, 6, 6)	Cumbia	"Juramentos"—Kaliente	Safe

- Public's favorite couple: Roberto & Katia (2 pts).

=== Week 3: Latin Pop ===
The couples (except those sentenced) danced latin pop.

Running order

Couple	Scores	Dance	Music	Result
Jesús & Cindy	26 (6, 7, 6, 7)	Latin pop	"Este Ritmo Se Baila Así"—Chayanne	Safe
Vanessa & Kenny	20 (5, 5, 4, 6)	Latin pop	"Livin' la Vida Loca"—Ricky Martin	Sentenced
Fernando & Jessenia	29 (9, 7, 6, 7)	Tondero*	"Tengo Una Chola En El Norte"—Adolfo Zelada Arteaga	Safe
Leonard & Gisela	27 (8, 7, 6, 6)	Huaylasrh*	"Valicha"—Miguel Ángel Hurtado Delgado	—N/a
Tilsa & Claussen	28 (7, 7, 6, 8)	Latin pop	"Arrasando"—Thalía	Safe
Adriana & Renzo	30 (8, 7, 7, 8)	Latin pop	"Candela"—Noelia	Safe
Jonathan & Kiara	31 (7, 8, 8, 8)	Latin pop	"Boom Boom"—Chayanne	Safe
Maricarmen & Diego	30 (7, 8, 7, 8)	Latin pop	"Mujer Latina"—Thalía	Safe
Roberto & Katia	24 (5, 7, 6, 6)	Latin pop	"Casanova"—Paulina Rubio	Safe
Renato & Rosa Amelia	23 (5, 6, 6, 6)	Latin pop	"She Bangs"—Ricky Martin	Sentenced
Gisela & Rayder	32 (7, 8, 8, 9)	Latin pop	"Te Aviso, Te Anuncio (Tango)"—Shakira	Best steps

- Public's favorite couple: Roberto & Katia (2 pts)

*The duel

- Fernando & Jessenia: Safe
- Leonard & Gisela: Eliminated

=== Week 4: Trío Salsa & Strip Dance Under the Rain ===
The couples (except those sentenced) were divided into two sets, the heroes and their dreamers danced trio salsa with a celebrity while heroines and their dreamers danced strip dance under the rain, the couple with the lowest score in each dance style was sentenced. In the danceathon the couples danced cumbia.

Due to an injury, Tilsa Lozano could not dance with Claussen Orbe, so Pierina Carcelén enters her place from this week.

Running order

Couple (Trio Dance Partner)	Scores	Dance	Music	Result
Jonathan & Kiara (Emilia Drago)	27 (6, 8, 6, 7)	Salsa	"El Preso"—Fruko y sus Tesos	Safe
Fernando & Jessenia (Ebelin Ortiz)	27 (6, 7, 7, 7)	Salsa	"Yo Quisiera"—Oscar D'León	Safe
Jesús & Cindy (Rebeca Escribens)	26 (6, 7, 7, 6)	Salsa	"Bam Bam"—Joe Arroyo	Safe
Roberto & Katia (Maricielo Effio)	24 (4, 7, 6, 7)	Salsa	"Muévete"—DLG	Sentenced
Renato & Rosa Amelia	20 (3, 6, 5, 6)	Axé*	"Dança da Maozinha"—Axé Bahia	—N/a
Vanessa & Kenny	28 (7, 7, 6, 8)	Axé*	"Dança de Manivela"—Axé Bahia	Safe
Gisela & Rayder	28 (6, 8, 6, 8)	Strip dance	"Womanizer"—Britney Spears	Safe
Pierina & Claussen	32 (8, 8, 8, 8)	Strip dance	"Lo Hecho Está Hecho"—Shakira	Best steps
Maricarmen & Diego	27 (6, 8, 5, 8)	Strip dance	"Mi Delirio"—Anahí	Safe
Adriana & Renzo	28 (7, 8, 7, 6)	Strip dance	"Poker Face"—Lady Gaga	Sentenced
Fernando & Jessenia; Pierina & Claussen; Vanessa & Kenny; Jonathan & Kiara; Maricarmen & Diego; Roberto & Katia; Jesús & Cindy; Gisela & Rayder; Adriana & Renzo; Renato & Rosa Amelia	2	Cumbia (The danceathon)	"Yo lo Quería"—Marisol y la Magia del Norte	

- Public's favorite couple: Roberto & Katia (2 pts)

*The duel

- Renato & Rosa Amelia: Eliminated
- Vanessa & Kenny: Safe

=== Week 5: World Dances & Reggaetón Under the Rain ===
The couples (except those sentenced) were divided into two sets, the heroines and their dreamers danced the world dances while heroes and their dreamers danced reggaeton under the rain, the couple with the lowest score in each dance style was sentenced. In the danceathon the couples danced cumbia.

Running order

Couple	Scores	Dance	Music	Result
Maricarmen & Diego	26 (6, 7, 6, 7)	(Brazil) Samba	"Magalenha"—Sérgio Mendes feat. Carlinhos Brown	Sentenced
Vanessa & Kenny	29 (7, 8, 7, 7)	(United States) Country	"Cotton-Eye Joe"—Rednex	Safe
Pierina & Claussen	32 (8, 8, 8, 8)	(France) Can-can	"Galop Infernal"—Vanessa Mae	Best steps
Gisela & Rayder	32 (8, 9, 7, 8)	(Spain) Rumba flamenca	"Marcha Marcha"—Rosario Flores	Best steps
Adriana & Renzo	29 (8, 7, 6, 8)	Jazz*	"We Go Together"—John Travolta & Olivia Newton-John	—N/a
Roberto & Katia	24 (4, 6, 6, 8)	Jazz*	"Greased Lightning"—John Travolta	Safe
Jonathan & Kiara	27 (6, 7, 7, 7)	Reggaeton	"El Ritmo No Perdona (Prende)"—Daddy Yankee	Safe
Jesús & Cindy	26 (6, 6, 7, 8)	Reggaeton	"Culipandeo"—DJ Warner	Safe
Fernando & Jessenia	23 (5, 6, 6, 6)	Reggaeton	"Na' de Na'"—Angel & Khriz	Sentenced
Fernando & Jessenia; Pierina & Claussen; Vanessa & Kenny; Jonathan & Kiara; Maricarmen & Diego; Roberto & Katia; Jesús & Cindy; Gisela & Rayder; Adriana & Renzo	2	Cumbia (The danceathon)	"Cariñito"—Bareto	

- Public's favorite couple: Roberto & Katia (2 pts)

*The duel

- Adriana & Renzo: Eliminated
- Roberto & Katia: Safe

=== Week 6: Disco ===
The couples danced disco (except those sentenced), a team dance of jazz and a danceathon of festejo.

Running order

Couple	Scores	Dance	Music	Result
Pierina & Claussen	28 (6, 8, 7, 7)	Disco	"No More Tears (Enough Is Enough)"—Donna Summer feat. Barbra Streisand	Safe
Jesús & Cindy	29 (7, 7, 8, 7)	Disco	"Boogie Wonderland"—Earth, Wind and Fire	Safe
Maricarmen & Diego	27 (6, 8, 6, 7)	Latin pop*	"Hay que venir al sur"—Raffaella Carrà	Safe
Fernando & Jessenia	28 (8, 7, 6, 7)	Latin pop*	"Explota Mi Corazón"—Raffaella Carrà	Sentenced
Jonathan & Kiara	37 (10, 10, 7, 10)	Disco	"Stayin' Alive"—Bee Gees	Safe
Vanessa & Kenny	31 (8, 8, 8, 7)	Disco	"Last Dance"—Donna Summer	Safe
Roberto & Katia	26 (6, 7, 7, 6)	Disco	"I Will Survive"—Gloria Gaynor	Sentenced
Gisela & Rayder	35 (9, 9, 9, 8)	Disco	"Knock on Wood"—Amii Stewart	Best steps
Pierina & Claussen; Vanessa & Kenny; Maricarmen & Diego; Gisela & Rayder	2	Jazz (Team A)	"Lady Marmalade"—Christina Aguilera, Lil' Kim, Mýa & Pink	
Fernando & Jessenia; Jonathan & Kiara; Roberto & Katia; Jesús & Cindy	0	Jazz (Team B)	"Don't Tell Mama"—Liza Minnelli	
Fernando & Jessenia; Pierina & Claussen; Vanessa & Kenny; Jonathan & Kiara; Maricarmen & Diego; Roberto & Katia; Jesús & Cindy; Gisela & Rayder	1 1	Festejo (The danceathon)	"Raíces del Festejo"—Pepe Vásquez	

- Public's favorite couple: Roberto & Katia (2 pts)

*The duel

- Maricarmen & Diego: Safe
- Fernando & Jessenia: Safe

(The two couples were saved by the faith balls)

=== Week 7: Merengue ===
The couples danced merengue (except those sentenced), a team dance of jazz and a danceathon of salsa.

Running order

Couple	Scores	Dance	Music	Result
Jesús & Cindy	29 (7, 7, 7, 8)	Merengue	"El Blablazo"—Toño Rosario	Safe
Vanessa & Kenny	30 (8, 7, 7, 8)	Merengue	"Conga Pal' Carnaval"—Nelson De La Olla	Safe
Pierina & Claussen	28 (6, 7, 7, 8)	Merengue	"La de la Tanguita Roja"—Oro Solido	Safe
Maricarmen & Diego	33 (9, 8, 8, 8)	Merengue	"Tiki Tiki"—Bernardo Vasquez	Safe
Roberto & Katia	23 (4, 6, 5, 8)	Jazz*	"Jailhouse Rock"—Elvis Presley	Sentenced
Fernando & Jessenia	26 (6, 7, 6, 7)	Jazz*	"Cuban Pete"—Desi Arnaz	Sentenced
Jonathan & Kiara	32 (8, 8, 7, 9)	Merengue	"Kulikitaka"—Toño Rosario	Safe
Gisela & Rayder	36 (9, 9, 9, 9)	Merengue	"Arriba, Abajo"—Oro Solido	Best steps
Fernando & Jessenia; Pierina & Claussen; Vanessa & Kenny; Jonathan & Kiara	0	Jazz (Team A)	"Billie Jean"—Michael Jackson	
Maricarmen & Diego; Roberto & Katia; Jesús & Cindy; Gisela & Rayder	2	Jazz (Team B)	"Beat It"—Michael Jackson	
Fernando & Jessenia; Pierina & Claussen; Vanessa & Kenny; Jonathan & Kiara; Maricarmen & Diego; Roberto & Katia; Jesús & Cindy; Gisela & Rayder	2	Salsa (The danceathon)	"Ya Para Qué"—Camaguey	

- Public's favorite couple: Roberto & Katia (2 pts)

*The duel

- Roberto & Katia: Safe
- Fernando & Jessenia: Safe

(The two couples were saved by the faith balls)

=== Week 8: Salsa ===
The couples (except those sentenced) danced salsa. In the versus the couples danced mambo.

Running order

Couple	Scores	Dance	Music	Result
Jonathan & Kiara	31 (7, 8, 8, 8)	Salsa	"El Baile del Azúcar"—La Charanga Habanera	Safe
Vanessa & Kenny	30 (7, 8, 7, 8)	Salsa	"Muevete"—La Charanga Habanera	Safe
Fernando & Jessenia	26 (5, 7, 7, 7)	Jazz*	"Footloose"—Kenny Loggins	—N/a
Roberto & Katia	24 (4, 7, 6, 7)	Jazz*	"Maniac"—Michael Sembello	Sentenced
Jesús & Cindy	28 (6, 8, 6, 8)	Salsa	"El Temba"—La Charanga Habanera	Safe
Gisela & Rayder	31 (7, 8, 8, 8)	Salsa	"Abre Que Voy"—Los Van Van	Safe
Maricarmen & Diego	33 (8, 9, 8, 8)	Salsa	"Hagamos Un Chen"—La Charanga Habanera	Best steps
Pierina & Claussen	19 (5, 5, 4, 5)	Salsa	"El Águila"—La Charanga Habanera	Sentenced

The versus
Couple	Judges' votes	Dance	Music	Result
Gisela & Rayder	Pierina, Gisela, Gisela	Mambo	"La Niña Popoff"—Pérez Prado	Winners (2 pts)
Pierina & Claussen	Pierina, Gisela, Gisela	Mambo	"Mambo Universitario"—Pérez Prado	Losers
Maricarmen & Diego	Maricarmen, Vanessa, Maricarmen	Mambo	"Mambo Nº 5"—Pérez Prado	Winners (2 pts)
Vanessa & Kenny	Maricarmen, Vanessa, Maricarmen	Mambo	"Que Le Pasa a Lupita"—Pérez Prado	Losers
Jesús & Cindy	Jesús, Jonathan, Jesús	Mambo	"Mambo Nº 8"—Pérez Prado	Winners (2 pts)
Jonathan & Kiara	Jesús, Jonathan, Jesús	Mambo	"Que Rico Mambo"—Pérez Prado	Losers
Fernando & Jessenia	Fernando, Roberto, Fernando	Mambo	"Ricky Ricón"—La Charanga Habanera	Winners (2 pts)
Roberto & Katia	Fernando, Roberto, Fernando	Mambo	"Deja Que Roberto Te Toque"—Isaac Delgado	Losers

- Public's favorite couple: Roberto & Katia (2 pts)

*The duel

- Fernando & Jessenia: Eliminated
- Roberto & Katia: Safe

=== Week 9: The Pop Divas ===
The couples danced pop. In the versus the couples danced pachanga.

Running order

Couple	Scores	Dance	Music	Result
Vanessa & Kenny	30 (8, 7, 7, 8)	Pop	"Me Against the Music"—Britney Spears feat. Madonna	Sentenced
Pierina & Claussen	32 (8, 8, 8, 8)	Pop*	"Girlfriend"—Avril Lavigne	—N/a
Roberto & Katia	28 (7, 7, 7, 7)	Pop*	"Hey Mickey"—Toni Basil	Sentenced
Jonathan & Kiara	34 (9, 9, 8, 8)	Pop	"Dirrty"—Christina Aguilera feat. Redman	Safe
Gisela & Rayder	39 (10, 10, 9, 10)	Pop	"Bad Romance"—Lady Gaga	Best steps
Jesús & Cindy	38 (10, 9, 9, 10)	Pop	"Telephone"—Lady Gaga feat. Beyoncé	Safe
Maricarmen & Diego	30 (8, 7, 7, 8)	Pop	"Let's Get Loud"—Jennifer Lopez	Safe

The versus
Couple	Judges' votes	Dance	Music	Result
Maricarmen & Diego	Maricarmen, Jesús, Maricarmen	Pachanga	"Ilarie"—Xuxa	Winners (2 pts)
Jesús & Cindy	Maricarmen, Jesús, Maricarmen	Pachanga	"Veo Veo"—Guajiros	Losers
Gisela & Rayder	Gisela, Gisela, Gisela	Pachanga	"1, 2, 3"—El Símbolo	Winners (2 pts)
Jonathan & Kiara	Gisela, Gisela, Gisela	Pachanga	"Mueve la Colita"—El Símbolo	Losers
Pierina & Claussen	Vanessa, Pierina, Pierina	Pachanga	"My Commanding Wife"—Los Rabanes	Winners(2 pts)
Roberto & Katia	Vanessa, Pierina, Pierina	Pachanga	"Gitana"—Los Fabulosos Cadillacs	Losers
Vanessa & Kenny	Vanessa, Pierina, Pierina	Pachanga	"Levantando las Manos"—El Símbolo	Losers

- Public's favorite couple: Roberto & Katia (2 pts)

*The duel

- Pierina & Claussen: Eliminated
- Roberto & Katia: Safe

=== Week 10: Hip-hop/Guaracha ===
Individual judges' scores in the charts below (given in parentheses) are listed in this order from left to right: Carlos Alcántara, Pachi Valle Riestra, Stuart Bishop, VIP Judge.

The couples danced hip-hop (except those sentenced), guaracha and a danceathon of cumbia.

Running order

Couple	Scores	Dance	Music	Result
Jesús & Cindy	28 (7, 7, 7, 7)	Hip-hop	"Pump It"—The Black Eyed Peas	Sentenced
Jesús & Cindy	26 (7, 7, 5, 7)	Guaracha	"El Muñeco de la Ciudad""—La Sonora Matancera	Sentenced
Jonathan & Kiara	29 (8, 8, 5, 8)	Hip-hop	"Hotel Room Service"—Pitbull	Safe
Jonathan & Kiara	28 (8, 6, 6, 8)	Guaracha	"El Negrito del Batey"—Alberto Beltrán	Safe
Maricarmen & Diego	27 (9, 6, 5, 7)	Hip-hop	"Noche de Entierro (Nuestro Amor)"—Luny Tunes	Safe
Maricarmen & Diego	31 (7, 8, 8, 8)	Guaracha	"La Mamá y la Hija"—Alquimia La Sonora del XXI	Safe
Vanessa & Kenny	31 (8, 6, 9, 8)	Jazz*	"(Meet) The Flintstones"—The B-52's	—N/a
Vanessa & Kenny	32 (8, 8, 8, 8)	Guaracha	"Caramelo"—La Sonora Matancera	—N/a
Roberto & Katia	22 (5, 5, 4, 8)	Jazz*	"The Addams Family Theme"—Vic Mizzy	Sentenced
Roberto & Katia	20 (4, 5, 5, 6)	Guaracha	"El Yerberito Moderno"—La Sonora Matancera	Sentenced
Gisela & Rayder	34 (10, 9, 6, 9)	Hip-hop	"Ahora Es"—Wisin & Yandel	Best steps
Gisela & Rayder	35 (9, 9, 8, 9)	Guaracha	"Burundanga"—Celia Cruz	Best steps
Vanessa & Kenny; Jonathan & Kiara; Maricarmen & Diego; Roberto & Katia; Jesús & Cindy; Gisela & Rayder	1; 1 1; 1	Cumbia (The danceathon)	"Agonía de Amor"—Dilbert Aguilar y La Tribu	

- Public's favorite couple: Jonathan & Kiara (2 pts)

*The duel

- Vanessa & Kenny: Eliminated
- Roberto & Katia: Safe

=== Week 11: Quarterfinals ===
The couples danced tex-mex (except those sentenced), a peruvian dance and a danceathon of festejo.

Due to an injury, Roberto Martínez was unable to perform, so Katia Monroy danced with former contestant José Luis "El Puma" Carranza instead.

Running order

Couple	Scores	Dance	Music	Result
Maricarmen & Diego	31 (8, 7, 8, 8)	Tex-mex	"Techno Cumbia"—Selena	Best steps
Maricarmen & Diego	32 (9, 8, 8, 7)	Huaylasrh	"Huaylarsh del Carnaval"	Best steps
Jonathan & Kiara	31 (8, 7, 7, 9)	Tex-mex	"El Chico del Apartamento 512"—Selena	Sentenced
Jonathan & Kiara	30 (8, 7, 7, 8)	Saya	"Soy Caporal"—Los Kjarkas	Sentenced
Gisela & Rayder	32 (8, 8, 8, 8)	Tex-mex	"Bandido"—Ana Bárbara	Best steps
Gisela & Rayder	33 (9, 8, 7, 9)	Festejo	"Ritmo, Color y Sabor"—Eva Ayllón	Best steps
Jesús & Cindy	29 (7, 8, 7, 7)	Jazz*	"Supercalifragilisticexpialidocious"—Sherman Brothers	Sentenced
Jesús & Cindy	32 (9, 8, 7, 8)	Marinera	"Que Viva Chiclayo"	Sentenced
El Puma & Katia	28 (8, 6, 8, 6)	Jazz*	"Ease On down the Road"—Consumer Rapport	—N/a
El Puma & Katia	26 (7, 6, 6, 7)	Carnaval	"Carnaval Arequipeño"	—N/a
Jonathan & Kiara; Maricarmen & Diego; Roberto & Katia; Jesús & Cindy; Gisela & Rayder	2	Festejo (The danceathon)	"Chacombo" / "Negrito de la Huayrona"—Jean Paul Strauss y Vibra Perú	

- Public's favorite couple: Jonathan & Kiara (2 pts)

*The duel

- Jesús & Cindy: Safe
- El Puma & Katia: Eliminated

=== Week 12: Semifinal ===
Individual judges' scores in the chart below (given in parentheses) are listed in this order from left to right: Marco Zunino, Pachi Valle Riestra, Stuart Bishop, VIP Judge

The couples danced jive, axé (except those sentenced), a team dance of salsa and a danceathon of cumbia.

Running order

Couple	Scores	Dance	Music	Result
Jesús & Cindy	31 (9, 9, 5, 8)	Hip-hop*	"Ninja Rap"—Vanilla Ice	Sentenced
Jesús & Cindy	33 (9, 8, 8, 8)	Jive	"Candyman"—Christina Aguilera	Sentenced
Jonathan & Kiara	29 (7, 7, 7, 8)	Hip-hop*	"U Can't Touch This"—MC Hammer	—N/a
Jonathan & Kiara	31 (8, 8, 7, 8)	Jive	"Hanky Panky"—Madonna	—N/a
Gisela & Rayder	32 (9, 7, 7, 9)	Axé	"Danza da vampiro"—Axé Bahia	Best steps
Gisela & Rayder	34 (9, 8, 8, 9)	Jive	"Wait and Sing"—Big Band Jazz	Best steps
Maricarmen & Diego	29 (8, 7, 6, 8)	Axé	"Oda Odess"—Axé Bahía	Sentenced
Maricarmen & Diego	33 (9, 8, 8, 8)	Jive	"Hit the Road Jack"—Ray Charles	Sentenced
Gisela & Rayder; Jonathan & Kiara	0	Salsa (Team A)	"Timba, Temba, Tumba"—Los Van Van	Losers
Jesús & Cindy; Maricarmen & Diego	2	Salsa (Team B)	"Abre Que Voy"—Los Van Van	Winners
Jonathan & Kiara; Maricarmen & Diego; Jesús & Cindy; Gisela & Rayder	2	Cumbia (The danceathon)	"Te eché al olvido"—Tony Rosado e Internacional Pacífico	

- Public's favorite couple: Gisela & Rayder (2 pts).

*The duel

- Jesús & Cindy: Safe
- Jonathan & Kiara: Eliminated

=== Week 13:Final ===
Individual judges' scores in the charts below (given in parentheses) are listed in this order from left to right: Morella Petrozzi, Marco Zunino, Pachi Valle Riestra, VIP Judge

On the first part, the sentenced couples danced cumbia and a mix dance (cha-cha-cha/salsa/quebradita).

On the second part, the final two couples danced a one unlearned dance and quickstep.

Running order (Part 1)

Couple	Scores	Dance	Music	Result
Jesús & Cindy	28 (6, 7, 7, 8)	Cumbia	"Mujer Hilandera" / "Pa' Todos Hay"—Bareto	Safe
Jesús & Cindy	30 (7, 8, 7, 8)	Cha-cha-cha; Salsa; Quebradita	"El Bodeguero"—Emmanuelle "Mi Gente"—El Gran Combo de Puerto Rico "La Chona"—Banda Los Pérez	Safe
Maricarmen & Diego	29 (7, 7, 7, 8)	Cumbia	"Cariñito" / "No Juegues Con el Diablo"—Bareto	Third place
Maricarmen & Diego	30 (8, 7, 8, 7)	Cha-cha-cha; Salsa; Quebradita	"Corazón de Melón"—Hermanas Benítez "Ven Morena"—Oscar D'León "La Quebradora"—Banda el Recodo	Third place

Running order (Part 2)

Couple	Scores	Dance	Music	Result
Gisela & Rayder	32 (8, 8, 7, 9)	Contemporary	"Bring Me to Life"—Evanescence feat. Paul McCoy	Winners
Gisela & Rayder	36 (9, 9, 9, 9)	Quickstep	"Sing, Sing, Sing (With a Swing)"—Benny Goodman	Winners
Jesús & Cindy	32 (8, 7, 9, 8)	Tango	"Sweet Dreams (Are Made of This)"—Eurythmics	Runner-up
Jesús & Cindy	37 (10, 10, 9, 8)	Quickstep	"Life Goes to a Party"—Harry James	Runner-up

== Dance chart ==
The celebrities and their dreamers will dance one of these routines for each corresponding week:

- Week 1: Pachanga (Pachanga)
- Week 2: Cumbia (Cumbia)
- Week 3: Latin pop (Latin Pop)
- Week 4: Trío salsa or strip dance under the rain & the danceathon (Trio Salsa/Strip Dance Under the Rain)
- Week 5: World dances or reggaeton under the rain & the danceathon (World Dances/Reggaetón Under the rain)
- Week 6: Disco, team dances & the danceathon (Disco)
- Week 7: Merengue, team dances & the danceathon (Merengue)
- Week 8: Salsa & the versus (Salsa)
- Week 9: Pop & the versus (The Pop Divas)
- Week 10: Hip-hop, guaracha & the danceathon (Hip-hop/Guaracha)
- Week 11: Peruvian dances, tex-mex & the danceathon (Quarterfinals)
- Week 12: Jive, axé, team dances & the danceathon (Semifinal)
- Week 13: Cumbia, mix (cha-cha-cha/salsa/quebradita), one unlearned dance & quickstep (Finals)

Couple	Week 1	Week 2	Week 3	Week 4	Week 5	Week 6	Week 7	Week 8	Week 9	Week 10		Week 11		Week 12		Week 13			
Gisela & Rayder	Pachanga	Cumbia	Latin pop	Strip dance	Rumba flamenca	Disco	Merengue	Salsa	Pop	Hip-hop	Guaracha	Tex-mex	Festejo	Axé	Jive	—N/a		Contemporary	Quickstep
Jesús & Cindy	Pachanga	Cumbia	Latin pop	Salsa	Reggaeton	Disco	Merengue	Salsa	Pop	Hip-hop	Guaracha	Jazz	Marinera	Hip-hop	Jive	Cumbia	Mix	Tango	Quickstep
Maricarmen & Diego	Pachanga	Cumbia	Latin pop	Strip dance	Samba	Latin pop	Merengue	Salsa	Pop	Hip-hop	Guaracha	Tex-mex	Huaylasrh	Axé	Jive	Cumbia	Mix		
Jonathan & Kiara	Pachanga	Cumbia	Latinp pop	Salsa	Reggaetón	Disco	Merengue	Salsa	Pop	Hip-hop	Guaracha	Tex-mex	Saya	Hip-hop	Jive				
Roberto & Katia	Pachanga	Cumbia	Latin pop	Salsa	Jazz	Disco	Jazz	Jazz	Pop	Jazz	Guaracha	Jazz	Carnaval						
Vanessa & Kenny	Pachanga	Cumbia	Latin pop	Axé	Country	Disco	Merengue	Salsa	Pop	Jazz	Guaracha								
Pierina & Claussen	Pachanga	Cumbia	Latin pop	Strip dance	Can-can	Disco	Merengue ripeado	Salsa	Pop										
Fernando & Jessenia	Pachanga	Cumbia	Tondero	Salsa	Reggaeton	Latin pop	Jazz	Jazz											
Adriana & Renzo	Pachanga	Cumbia	Latin pop	Strip dance	Jazz														
Renato & Rosa Amelia	Pachanga	Cumbia	Latin pop	Axé															
Leonard & Gisela	Pachanga	Cumbia	Huaylasrh																

Modalities of competition
Couple	Week 4	Week 5	Week 6		Week 7		Week 8	Week 9	Week 10	Week 11	Week 12	
Gisela & Rayder	Cumbia	Cumbia	Jazz	Festejo	Jazz	Salsa	Mambo	Pachanga	Cumbia	Festejo	Salsa	Cumbia
Jesús & Cindy	Cumbia	Cumbia	Jazz	Festejo	Jazz	Salsa	Mambo	Pachanga	Cumbia	Festejo	Salsa	Cumbia
Maricarmen & Diego	Cumbia	Cumbia	Jazz	Festejo	Jazz	Salsa	Mambo	Pachanga	Cumbia	Festejo	Salsa	Cumbia
Jonathan & Kiara	Cumbia	Cumbia	Jazz	Festejo	Jazz	Salsa	Mambo	Pachanga	Cumbia	Festejo	Salsa	Cumbia
Roberto & Katia	Cumbia	Cumbia	Jazz	Festejo	Jazz	Salsa	Mambo	Pachanga	Cumbia	Festejo		
Vanessa & Kenny	Cumbia	Cumbia	Jazz	Festejo	Jazz	Salsa	Mambo	Pachanga	Cumbia			
Pierina & Claussen	Cumbia	Cumbia	Jazz	Festejo	Jazz	Salsa	Mambo	Pachanga				
Fernando & Jessenia	Cumbia	Cumbia	Jazz	Festejo	Jazz	Salsa	Mambo					
Adriana & Renzo	Cumbia	Cumbia										
Renato & Rosa Amelia	Cumbia											
Leonard & Gisela												

Highest scoring dance
Lowest scoring dance
Gained bonus points for winning this dance
Gained no bonus points for losing this dance
In italic indicate the dance performed in the duel
