= Death in Buenos Aires =

- Theatrical release poster
- Muerte en Buenos Aires
- Directed by: Natalia Meta
- Written by: Natalia Meta; Laura Farhi; Gustavo Malajovich; Luz Orlando Brennan
- Produced by: Verónica Cura; Fabiana Tiscornia
- Starring: Demián Bichir; Chino Darín; Mónica Antonópulos; Carlos Casella; Emilio Disi; Hugo Arana; Luisa Kuliok
- Cinematography: Rodrigo Pulpeiro
- Edited by: Eliane D. Katz
- Music by: Daniel Melero; Sebastián Escofet
- Release date: May 15, 2014 (Argentina)
- Running time: 91 minutes
- Country: Argentina
- Language: Spanish

Death in Buenos Aires (Spanish: Muerte en Buenos Aires) is a 2014 Argentine crime film directed by Natalia Meta in her directorial debut. It follows a police inspector struggling to balance his duties with his unspoken sexual desire, and a young and handsome rookie on the police force with enigmatic motivations.

Set in 1989, the film was shot entirely in Buenos Aires during the months of January and February 2013.

== Plot ==
Inspector Chávez, a detective on the Buenos Aires police force, and his partner Dolores are called one summer night to the Recoleta residence of Jaime Figueroa Alcorta, a wealthy older gay member of Buenos Aires high society. At the scene, Chávez meets the young officer Gómez, who says that he found Alcorta's body after investigating a noise complaint and who has been examining the dead man's possessions. The next day, the two men encounter each other in the police station restroom, where Gómez shows Chávez a matchbook from the gay nightclub Manila that he accidentally took from the crime scene.

Dolores and Chávez head to Manila in search of "Kevin," a lover of Alcorta who had left a message on the victim's answering machine. Chávez watches a flamboyant performance of a song he remembers from a record at the victim's apartment. He is approached by Gómez, claiming that he has also come to the club to investigate. Chávez angrily confronts Gómez, believing that the young man is following him, but accidentally starts a bar fight in the process, allowing the singer Kevin to escape in the melee.

Gómez joins Chávez on the homicide investigation, and they hatch a plan for Gómez to go undercover, using the younger man's good looks to get closer to Kevin. Gómez goes on a number of dates with Kevin, leading him to believe that Kevin is innocent. Meanwhile, Chávez, who is stuck in a passionless marriage, finds himself increasingly drawn to Gómez, though he does not acknowledge or act on his attraction. Chávez tries to call off the plan, thinking that Gómez is growing too fond of the suspect and questioning Gómez's sexuality; Gómez retorts by wondering if Chávez is becoming jealous. Later, Kevin takes Gómez to a room at Manila and they begin to have sex, but they are interrupted by Chávez and Dolores, who have been watching via hidden camera. Kevin is arrested and taken into custody.

Chávez goes to interrogate the incarcerated Kevin, who convinces Chávez to release him from prison temporarily. Kevin shows Chávez a herd of horses that he claims the Alcorta family use for drug smuggling. Gómez arrives on the scene and fatally shoots Kevin as he attempts to escape on horseback. Chávez again confronts Gómez, who claims that he was only trying to protect Chávez and that Kevin invented the smuggling story. When Gómez attempts to pull Chávez in for a kiss, Chávez reacts with a mixture of anger and desire, holding Gómez at gunpoint and forcing him against his car. Chávez begins to unbuckle his belt, but is interrupted by the arrival of police backup.

The city's criminal justice system moves to close the investigation under pressure from the Alcorta family. However, Chávez discovers that the horses were surgically implanted with drugs, matching Kevin's story. Chávez now believes that Gómez killed Jaime Figueroa Alcorta on behalf of the Alcorta family, who were angered by the dead man's opposition to the smuggling business. When Chávez confronts Gómez with his hypothesis, Gómez pleads innocence, and Chávez's paranoia reaches an extreme when he draws his gun on two policemen. Realizing his mistake, Chávez exclaims that he is going insane. Gómez comforts Chávez and begins to kiss him. After initially pulling back, Chávez returns the kiss passionately, but is soon stopped by a gunshot to the stomach, confirming his suspicions about Gómez. As he sinks to the ground, Gómez tells him that he will miss him. Gómez throws his gun into the river, smokes a cigarette, and walks off into the night.

== Cast ==
- Demián Bichir as Inspector Chávez
- Chino Darín as Officer "El Ganso" Gómez
- Mónica Antonópulos as Officer Dolores Petric
- Carlos Casella as Kevin "Carlos" Gonzalez
- Emilio Disi as Judge Morales
- Jorgelina Aruzzi as Ana Chávez
- Hugo Arana as Commissioner Sanfilippo
- Luisa Kuliok as Blanca Figueroa Alcorta
- Humberto Tortonese as Calígula Moyano
- Gino Renni as Tailor
- Fabián Arenillas as Doctor Anchorena
- Nehuen Penzotti as Miguel Chávez
- Martín Wullich as Jaime "Copito" Figueroa Alcorta

== Reception ==
=== Critical reception ===
Death in Buenos Aires received mixed reviews from critics. Argentine review aggregator website Todas las Críticas gives the film a rating of 54%, based on 39 reviews.

Juan Carlos Fontana of La Prensa gave the film a favorable review, praising Natalia Meta as a directorial novice and the performances of the lead actors, in particular Darín and Casella. He enjoyed the film's humor and the dynamic between Bichir and Darín's characters. Pablo Scholz of Clarín also reviewed the film positively, writing that "Natalia Meta's debut is flawlessly wrought" and that the film "fulfills its purpose and will not disappoint." Conversely, in his review for La Nación, Alejandro Lingenti criticized the film for emphasizing style over substance; he called the storyline weak and oftentimes implausible and complained that the relationship between Bichir and Darín seemed forced and unnatural.

=== Accolades ===
In July 2015, Chino Darín won the prize for Best Actor in a feature film at the 19th Bucheon International Fantastic Film Festival for his role as Gómez.
