= Karen Schwarz =

Peruvian model (born 1984)

- Born: Karen Susana Schwarz Espinoza; 21 January 1984 (age 42); Callao, Peru
- Occupation: Host of reality TV show Yo Soy
- Years active: 2011–present
- Height: 1.70 m (5 ft 7 in)

Karen Susana Schwarz Espinoza (born 21 January 1984 in Callao, Peru) is a Peruvian actress, former tv host and beauty pageant titleholder who was crowned Miss Peru Universe 2009 and represented her country at Miss Universe 2009. She was the co-host of Yo Soy.

== Career ==
In 2011, Schwarz was part of the cast of the TV game show El último pasajero, hosted by Adolfo Aguilar, as one of the three "aire hostess". She also became representative, image and brand partner of Álika.

In 2012, Schwarz represented Peru in Buenos Aires Fashion Week, as an ambassador for Sedal. She then became co-host of the reality show Yo soy, again with Aguilar on Frecuencia Latina. Months later, she began to host the show Espectáculos on the same channel.

Schwarz continued as co-hostess of Yo Soy on Frecuencia Latina in 2013. She was to debut as an actress in the 2014 film Japy Ending.

== Filmography ==
Television
Year	Title	Role	Notes
2011	El último pasajero	Model	"Air hostess"
2011	Lalola	Ivana	Guest
2012–present	Yo Soy	Co-hostess	
2012—2015	Espectáculos	Presenter	
Film
Year	Title	Role	Notes
2014	Japy Ending	Montserrat	

== Beauty contests ==
- Miss Perú Universo 2009 - Winner
- Miss Universe 2009 - Peruvian candidate
- Miss Continente Americano 2009 - Runner-up
- Miss Intercontinental 2010 - First runner-up

== See also ==
- Miss Peru Universo 2009
- Miss Peru

Preceded by Karol Castillo †	Miss Perú; 2009	Succeeded by Giuliana Zevallos
Preceded by Karol Castillo †	Miss Continente Americano Peru; 2009	Succeeded by Giuliana Zevallos
