= Agua Bella =

- Origin: Peru
- Genres: cumbia, technocumbia
- Years active: 1999–present
- Members: Angelica Maria; Grecia Cadillo; Sandy Rojas; Alejandra Saavedra; Luciana Vasquez
- Past members: Nash Moreno; Alejandra Pascuccu; Alhely Cheng; Cielo Torres; Evelyn Campos; Gaby Zambrano; Giuliana Rengifo; Marina Yafa; Maricarmen Marín; Romy Simeón; Rosa Salazar; Yolanda Medina; Rosa Leyva; Cintya Macedo; Fiorella Alburqueque; Kelly Tito; Nancy Castelo Branco V.; Gladys Salas
- Website: http://www.aguabella.org

Agua Bella is a female technocumbia music group from Peru.

== History ==
Agua Bella was created in 1999 by music entrepreneur José Castillo. After castings to hire singers and dancers, the original band was composed by singers Evelyn Campos and Yolanda Medina with some non-regular dancers. Their first album, Cariño Loco, was a success. Since then, Castillo has worked to keep the band between five and six members between singers and dancers.

In 2004, after ten CDs and hundreds of live plays and television appearances, the band announced a "new generation" of the band, leading to a major change in their line-up. Most of the original members went on an international farewell tour, while the new generation performed their debut tour in Peru.

== Discography ==
An incomplete list of albums, with singles also listed.

- Cariño Loco ("Lucerito Mío", "Cariño Loco", "Merezco un Nuevo Amor")
- Agua Bella: ¡Sólo hay una! ("Pasito Tun Tun", "Agua de veneno", "Luna Bonita")
- Mil Años (double CD) ("Voy a Buscarme un Amor", "Porqué, Porqué", "El Silbido")
- Mejor que Nunca ("El Zapateadito", "Sólo un Papel", "Te Dejo Libre")
- Sólo Compárame ("Que No, Que No", "Me Abandonaste", "Salud por Él", "Sólo Compárame")
- Mi Orgullo Puede Más ("Que Tienen tus Ojos", "Mi Orgullo Puede Más")
- Imparables ("Llévate mi Corazón", "Nadie Muere de Amor", "Que te vaya bien", "Dime por que Te Vas")
- El Gran Fiestón ("Así Te Quería Ver")
