= Peloteros =

- Film poster
- Directed by: Coco Castillo
- Written by: Coco Castillo; Max Gamero
- Produced by: Gustavo Sánchez
- Starring: Maricarmen Marín; Mónica Cabrejos; Joel Ezeta; Marco Antonio Solís; Cristian Ruiz; Stefano Tosso; Frank Mac Bride; Yamir Londres; Juan Manuel Ochoa; Javier Echevarría Escribens
- Edited by: Carlos Alberto Carnero
- Music by: Roberto Montero; Martín Velázquez
- Release dates: June 29, 2006 (Peru); April 2007 (Cuba)
- Running time: 98 minutes
- Countries: Peru; Cuba
- Language: Spanish

Peloteros (lit. 'Ballplayers') is a 2006 Peruvian–Cuban sports action comedy-drama film directed by Coco Castillo and written by Castillo & Max Gamero. It stars Joel Ezeta, Marco Antonio Solís, Christian Ruiz, Stefano Tosso, Frank Mac Bride, Yamir Londres, Mónica Cabrejos and Maricarmen Marín. It follows the adventures of a group of adolescents during the 1990s in a neighborhood of Lima. Most of the film focuses on soccer, a central part of the characters' lives. The name of the film, "Peloteros", is the same slang used in Peru to define a group of men, regardless of age, who try to play soccer at any time possible.

== Plot ==
In a neighborhood of Breña, Lima, a group of baseball players always played on Sundays with more skilled players, and they lost. The group was made up of Norman (Joel Ezeta), Luchito (Marco Antonio Solís), "Vargas Llosita", the intellectual of the group (Christian Ruiz); Aldo (Stefano Tosso), the Black (Frank Mac Bride) and the Chinese (Yamir London). Despite that, the boys celebrated, relaxed drinking.

But there are difficulties that arise: Luchito tells his friends that he will soon move to the United States, but they are in need of money for their passage and their studies; Norman witnesses the physical and sexual abuse that his alcoholic father Ramiro (Juan Manuel Ochoa) inflicts on his mother, Rosa (Mónica Cabrejos).

The young players seek to enter a soccer championship and win said competition, demonstrating the friendship they have, the passion they feel for the sport, and the love they seek to have with women. Among this story (narrated by Vargas Llosita), there are other feats of the group of adolescents, being funny or serious that will remain for a lifetime and those of the young boys.

== Cast ==
The actors participating in this film are:

- Joel Ezeta as Norman
- Marco Antonio Solis as Luchito
- Christian Ruiz as Vargas Llosita
- Stefano Tosso as Aldo
- Frank Mac Bride as Black
- Yamir London as Chino
- Maricarmen Marín as Marlene
- Mónica Cabrejos as Rosa
- Juan Manuel Ochoa as Ramiro
- Javier Echevarría as Carlos
- Ricky Tosso as Paquito
- Renzo Schuller as Norman (adult)

== Release ==
The film premiered on June 29, 2006, in Lima, Peru. In Cuba, Peloteros was shown at the Cine Pobre Film Festival in April 2007. It was then released on DVD in 2007, as was its North American edition of the same year by Laguna Productions.

In Chile, it was chosen as the Best Feature Film at the Second Social Film and Human Rights Festival in 2008.

== Soundtrack ==
No.	Title	Interpreter(s)	Length
1.	"La Calle"	Maricarmen Marín
2.	"Si No Estás Tú"	La Negra
3.	"Candela"	MC Francia
4.	"Pagarás Mis Lágrimas"	Maricarmen Marín
5.	"Anjali"	La Negra
6.	"Boom"	MC Francia
7.	"Me Vas A Matar"	Maricarmen Marín
8.	"Te Necesito"	La Negra
9.	"Hasta Aquí Nomás"	Dos Vírgenes
10.	"Corazón, Corazón"	Maricarmen Marín
11.	"Cerca De Mí"	La Negra
12.	"Peloteros"	Los Diablos De La Cumbia
13.	"Movie Trailer (Bonus Track)"
