= Baruch Ivcher =

Israeli-born business tycoon

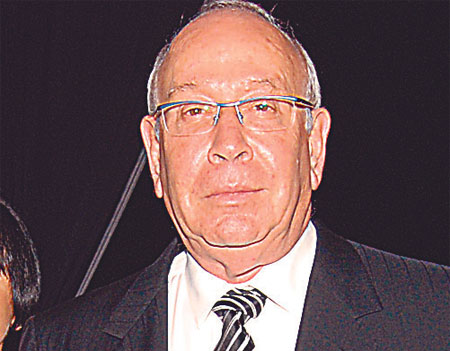

Baruch Ivcher (Hebrew: ברוך איבצ'ר) is an Israeli-born billionaire business tycoon who lives in Peru. Ivcher was a majority shareholder of the Peruvian television station Frecuencia Latina. President Alberto Fujimori ordered Ivcher stripped of his Peruvian citizenship when the station's investigative program Contrapunto exposed government corruption.

== Early life ==
Ivcher was born in Hadera, Mandatory Palestine (now in Israel). After graduating from law school at the Hebrew University of Jerusalem, he opened a law office in Hadera. In 1970, he moved to Lima, Peru, where he opened a mattress factory, Productos Paraiso, now the largest bedding company in South America, worth well over $1 billion. Ivcher and his wife Nomi had 4 children.

== Media ownership ==
Ivcher acquired Peruvian nationality in keeping with a law in force at the time according to which aliens were not permitted to own a radio or television channel in Peru. In 1996, Ivcher's television station, Canal 2 (now Frecuencia Latina), began airing investigative reports accusing Vladimiro Montesinos, head of Peru's national intelligence service, of links to death squads and drug traffickers. After attempts to bribe Ivcher and pay him $19 million to allow government monitoring of the program, Ivcher's citizenship was revoked and he was forced into exile.

In July 1997, the case was submitted to the Inter-American Commission on Human Rights, which called on the Peruvian government to cease harassing Ivcher and violating his freedom of expression, reinstate him as president and director of Canal 2, and indemnify him for the false accusations against him.

In 2011, Ivcher sold Canal 2 (now Frecuencia Latina) for over $600 million.
