= Vanessa Jeri =

Peruvian comedy actress and model

Vanessa Jeri (born c. December 2, 1979) is a Peruvian comedy actress and model.

== Biography ==
She has two sisters.

Jeri heard about a casting call for a comedy show named Mil Oficios (Jack of a Thousand Trades), attended the casting and was chosen to play one of the show's main characters, one of the two so-called Hermanas Terremoto (Earthquake Sisters), the other one being Sandra Arana, who had had more acting experience.

Mil Oficios became a hit on Peruvian television, giving Jeri celebrity in that country, as well as in some countries where the show was available via satellite television. She and Sandra Arana became sex symbols once the show hit the airwaves, and Jeri continued her acting career.

Jeri has also had her share of endorsements, including one for Clinica Renuance, an institution in Peru, where she admitted to having had a liposuction.

Jeri could most recently be seen on the comedy show Teatro Desde El Teatro (Theatre From The Theatre) which is shown on América Televisión in Peru.

== See also ==
- List of Peruvians
