= Roberto Martínez (footballer, born 1967) =

Peruvian footballer

Personal information
- Full name: Roberto J. Martínez Vera-Tudela
- Date of birth: December 3, 1967 (age 58)
- Place of birth: Lima, Peru
- Height: 1.81 m (5 ft 11 in)
- Position: Midfielder

Youth career
- 1973–1984: Universitario

Senior career*
Years	Team	Apps	(Gls)
1985–1986	San Agustín	45	(12)
1987–1996	Universitario	213	(76)
1997	Sport Boys	24	(6)
1998	Deportivo Municipal	10	(1)

International career^{‡}
1986–1993	Peru	24	(1)
- * Club domestic league appearances and goals ‡ National team caps and goals as of December 4, 2007

Roberto Joaquín Martínez Vera-Tudela (born December 3, 1967, in Lima) is a Peruvian football manager and former player. He is one of the top representative players of Universitario de Deportes from the late 1980s and mid 1990s.

== Career ==
He won national titles both with Universitario de Deportes and Deportivo San Agustin in conjunction to his good friend and player José del Solar. Martínez made 24 appearances for the Peru national football team from 1986 to 1993.
