= Maricarmen Marín =

Maricarmen Marin
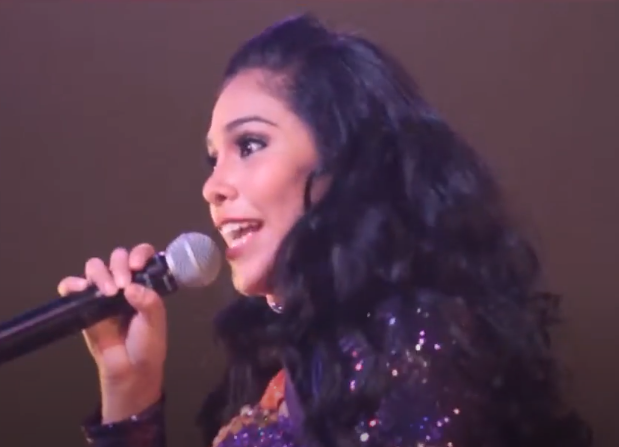
- Marín in 2017

Background information
- Born: Maricarmen Marín Salinas; September 28, 1982 (age 44); Lima, Peru
- Genre: Cumbia
- Occupations: Singer, Actress, Dancer, TV Host, Author
- Instrument: Vocals
- Years active: 2001–present
- Label: "Musicine Producciones”
- Website: Official social network accounts YouTube, Facebook and Twitter

Maricarmen Marín Salinas is a Peruvian actress, cumbia singer, dancer, and TV host. She started as a dancer in the musical show "La movida de los Sabados" and she became famous as the lead singer of the female technocumbia musical group "Agua Bella". Maricarmen participated in El Gran Show in 2010. In 2011 she currently stars as Natasha in the América Televisión series "Yo no me llamo Natacha" (English: "My name is not Natacha") for which she also performed the theme song. She is also currently a solo singer. In 2018, she released her new hit song ¿Por Qué Te Fuiste? (English: "Why did you leave?") which had airplay success throughout Latin America and Europe.

In December 2020 she released a children's book about her childhood Christmas adventures titled La Dulce Princesita. On July 11, 2021 she announced via Facebook that she is 3 months pregnant. On December 10, 2021 she gave birth to her first daughter who she named Micaela Martins Marín to whom she wrote the song "Tu Camino". She has over 3 million followers on social media and over 100 million views on her YouTube channel.

== Discography ==
=== Studio albums ===
Solo

- Me Enamoré De Ti, ¡Y Qué! (2006)
- ¡Cumbia Poder! (2008)
- ¡Con Estilo! (2011)
- Navidad Maricarmen (2015)
- Navidad Maricarmen 2 (2016)
- Navidad Maricarmen 3 (2017)

=== Singles ===
- Me Enamoré De Ti, ¡Y Qué!
- Sarita Colonia
- Vete Nomás ( From "Al Fondo Hay Sitio")
- Yo No Me Llamo Natacha (From "Yo No Me Llamo Natacha")
- Amor De Novela (From "La Peor De Mis Bodas")
- Obsesión
- Por Fin Soy Libre
- ¿Por Qué Te Fuiste?
- Mi Suegra (featuring Patrick Romantik)(From "La Peor De Mis Bodas 2")
- Mix Bella (Tribute to Agua Bella)
- Anótalo (with Américo)
- La Copita
- Que no quede huella
- Color Esperanza (with various artist)
- Tu Camino
- Dejar De Amarte
- Mi Corazón Tun Tun (From "Súper Ada")
- Conquístame (featuring Pablo Heredia)(From "Súper Ada")

=== Collaborations ===
- Hasta El Fin Del Mundo (with Diego Dibós)
- Conquístame (with Los Pikadientes de Caborca)
- Mis Sentimientos (with Los Barraza and Daniela Darcourt)

=== Soundtracks ===
- Al Fondo Hay Sitio (2008)
- Yo No me Llamo Natacha (2011)
- La Peor De Mis Bodas (2016)
- Una Navidad en Verano (2018)
- La Peor De Mis Bodas 2 (2019)

== Filmography ==
=== Television ===
- 2005: "Teatro Desde El Teatro" (Karla)
- 2006: "Vírgenes de la Cumbia" (Fátima)
- 2006: "Vírgenes de la Cumbia 2" (Fátima)
- 2007: "El Profe"
- 2008: "Chapulin el dulce"
- 2008: "El Gran reto"
- 2008: "La Pre" (Karina)
- 2008: "Habacilar" - Amigos y Rivales de la Cumbia (first place)
- 2008: "Habacilar" - Los Mejores Amigos y Rivales (fourth place)
- 2009: "Habacilar" - Amigos y Rivales Habacilar vs. Reyes de la Cumbia (first place)
- 2010: "El Gran Show: First Season (Heroína, third place)
- 2010: "Puro corazón"
- 2011: "Yo no me llamo Natacha" (Natasha)
- 2024: "Súper Ada" (Ada)
- 2026: "Valentina valiente" (Cameo)

=== Movies ===
- 2006: Peloteros
- 2016: La peor de mis bodas (Won a Luces Award for Best Actress)
- 2019: La peor de mis bodas 2 (Nominated for Luces Award for Best Actress)
- 2023: La peor de mis bodas 3
