= Carlos Casella =

Argentinean actor, dancer, choreographer and singer

- Citizenship: argentino
- Occupation: Actor
- Years active: 1988-present
- Known for: Death in Buenos Aires

Carlos Casella is an Argentinean actor, dancer, choreographer and singer.

== Biography ==
Carlos Casella began his artistic career as a leading voice at White Model musical group. In 1988 he began his work as a dancer and choreographer with Ana Frenkel by being selected at the First Biennial of Young Art 89 for his work Red Paso. He graduated from the Contemporary Dance Workshop of General San Martin Theater and dance as a guest in his company under the direction of Oscar Araiz.

He participated in plays and dancing shows in the international festivals, including Alternative Theatre of Madrid, Movements / Kampnagel / Hamburg, The Orangeri of Hannover, College Columbia, Londrinhas in Brazil, Borders in London, Festival at Queens of Belfast. In 1995 along with The Descueve, Casella created the company Villa-Villa, showing the theater group De La Guarda in Dharyl Roth Theatre in New York City and Roundhouse in London. He works with different directors in Argentina, including Daulte Javier Alejandro Tantanian, Jose Maria Muscari, Alejandro Maci.

== Filmography ==
- 2015 AM - Antes del mediodía (TV Series) as himself
- 2015 Pura Química (TV Series) as himself (2 credits)
- 2014 Death in Buenos Aires as Kevin González
- 2011 Juan y Eva Cantante cabaret

== Awards ==
He was awarded Nexo XXI Century Award for his work "All happy." His work also received Guarania Mia Grant Award for Choreographic Creation of the Antorchas Foundation and the grant PRODANZA.
