= Latina Televisión =

Peruvian free-to-air television network

- Type: Free-to-air
- Country: Peru
- Broadcast area: Peru
- Headquarters: Lima

Ownership
- Owner: Vytal Group
- Key people: Cayetana Aljovín, President

History
- Founded: 1982
- Launched: 23 January 1983; 43 years ago
- Founder: Eduardo Cavero
- Former names: Frecuencia 2 (1983-1993); Frecuencia Latina (1993-2014)

Links
- Website: www.latina.pe

Availability

Terrestrial
- Analog VHF: Channel 2 (Lima, listings may vary)
- Digital VHF: Channel 2.1 (Lima, listings may vary)

Latina Televisión (also known as Latina TV or simply Latina, and previously known as Frecuencia Latina Televisión or Frecuencia Latina) is a Peruvian free-to-air television channel that has been broadcasting since 1983.

It is the third private channel to start broadcasting. In 2005, it was the fourth most-watched channel according to CPI, and in 2008, it reached the third position according to Kantar Ibope Media. Its broadcast headquarters are located on Av. San Felipe in the Jesús María District of Lima. The channel is owned by Vytal Group.

== History ==
=== Launch and early years ===
In 1982, Compañía Latinoamericana de Radiodifusión S.A. was formed by Bernardo Batievsky (advertiser and filmmaker), Samuel and Mendel Winter (owners of the chocolate company Procacao S.A), and Baruch Ivcher (owner of the mattress company Paraíso del Perú S.A). They reacquired the license previously revoked from Tele 2. After conducting test broadcasts for four hours a day, the channel was relaunched on January 23, 1983, under the name Frecuencia 2 from a mansion in the Miraflores district of Lima. The inaugural ceremony was led by then-president Fernando Belaúnde Terry.

The channel, at that time, was characterized by its extensive foreign programming, although it also denoted its non-existent national production, due to the fact that it did not have its own infrastructure, like the rest of the channels at that time. In the beginning, the channel was originally modeled after American independent stations (WPIX, WGN, KWGN, KTLA, WTBS, etc.). The channel's most notable programs at that time were ABC del Deporte, Sundays for youth and a micro-newscast called 90 Segundos. The latter only lasted a minute and a half at that time. By 1984, it would be relaunched as The 90 Seconds Special and became a primetime newscast. In April 1989, Frecuencia 2 launched the newscast Contrapunto, which was characterized by its reports, condemnations and scandals that marked the era of the Alberto Fujimori regime. However, the program in its final years adopted a pro-government editorial line and lost credibility for negatively portraying opponents of Fujimorism. Two years after Fujimori's resignation, Contrapunto was taken off the air in November 2002 to be replaced a year later by Reporte Semanal.

=== Growth ===
In its beginnings, the signal reached all of Lima, from Huacho to Chincha. For this reason, the channel decided to install its own retransmitter, starting with Ica in 1987. From there, retransmitters and centers began to be installed throughout the country. In 1990, a transponder was acquired on the PanAmSat satellite to broadcast via satellite to the rest of the country.

Over time, the channel increased in terms of programming, personnel and local productions. The channel's programming consisted of contests, comedy and political debates. However, due to the lack of studios at the time, these were recorded in various theaters in the city. Later, the channel produced its own first fiction series, called Matalaché. In 1989, the channel acquired a larger location in a mansion in the Jesús María district to house the new facilities.

On June 5, 1992, during the age of terrorism in Peru, a car bomb of the Maoist group Shining Path destroyed a large part of its facilities and led to the death of three of its staff. Eventually, its facilities were rebuilt and modernized, creating the studios that are still in operation.

=== Rename and local fiction ===
Facing the network's growth and national expansion, on October 31, 1993, the channel relaunched itself as Frecuencia Latina (English: Latin Frequency) in order to be better identified nationwide. With this change, the new company arrived, shared by its major shareholder Baruch Ivcher and director Luis Llosa Urquidi with his company Iguana Producciones, to produce national series and telenovelas. Due to this arrangement, several programs produced by the channel were broadcast locally, and some of the actors and actresses that took part in them jumped to stardom in Latin American television.

=== Management under the Winter brothers ===
Frecuencia Latina was no longer in the hands of Baruch Ivcher (major shareholder) in 1997. Brothers Mendel and Samuel Winter (minor shareholders) had taken over the channel, as Baruch lost is nationality illegally. The channel's logo also changed to be green and yellow, lasting until 2002.

Several productions were produced over the course of the 90s, such as Las mil y una... de Carlos Álvarez (1989-1997), JB Noticias (1994-2001), with Jorge Benavides, who would also play, in another program, the role of La Paisana Jacinta, the interview program Maritere with former Contrapunto (1989-2002) journalist Maritere Braschi, kids show Almendra, with Almendra Gomelsky, which ran from 1995 to 1997; Pataclaun, between 1997 and 1999, Hablemos Claro and China en Acción, both presented by Mónica Chang, among others.

Reporter Magaly Medina was also on this network between 1998 and 2000, with her own program Magaly TV, due to the impasses at ATV with Cecilia Valenzuela. She quit when the Winter brothers lost the channel which they were major shareholders. Other personalities that worked at the channel in those days include Martha Sofía Salazar, Mónica Zevallos, Don Pedrito, Marisol García, Jaime Chincha, Beatriz Alva Hart (former Peruvian congresswoman and later commissioner for the Truth and Reconciliation Commission), Lucero Sánchez, Drusila Zileri and others.

=== Return of Baruch Ivcher ===
Baruch Ivcher finally recovered his Peruvian nationality, like the administration of the channel, in 2000, thanks to a resolution from the Inter-American Court of Human Rights, as it was seen as a persecution on behalf of the Fujimorist regime. The Winter brothers were later arrested in 2001, although they were freed that year in an act of effective cooperation. However, after César Hildebrandt denounced in his program, Ivcher announced the investigation of a document in 2003 where he supposedly documented a follow-up. Years later, Hildebrandt revealed that he had received compensation from the Peruvian government, which the channel made public. Additionally, the Executive Secretary of the National Human Rights Council, Luis Salgado, renounced for discrepancies by the government.

The network was known as Frecuencia Latina (English: Latin Frequency) until November 2014.

In November 2024, the company announced its new identity, created by agencies Fahrenheit DDB and After, over a one-year period.

== Technical information ==
Virtual channel	Content
x.1 HD	Main high-definition signal launched on September 14, 2010, which broadcasts in 1080i at 60fps.
x.2 SD 1	480i simulcast of the channel, airing in 16:9 since 2014.
2.3 SD 2 (+1)	Formerly the one-hour timeshift, the channel carries Latina Digital with news and related content since 2023.
x.4 Latina Móvil	The 1seg, 240p, 30fps mobile feed. On May 25, 2021, Latina updated its website and app for the content to be displayed in 640 x 480p.

== Criticism ==
During 2015, Latina has been harshly criticized for broadcasting content called junk television in its programming within the child protection schedule, with the program Amor, amor, amor being the one that has received the most rejection from the audience. The main argument that was used to support this position towards such programs was that the station was limited to broadcasting entertainment and topics related to this genre in a tabloid manner, such as gossip, rumors, love affairs and infidelities of the channel's celebrities. As a result, America was also in the crosshairs of criticism, because the station had violated the country's Radio and Television Law several times by broadcasting the program Esto es Guerra. Also, ATV was at the time in controversy for the broadcast of its reality television program Combate (until 2018). The first March Against Junk Television organized by the College of Journalists of Peru was organized, created with the purpose of restoring the child protection schedule system (article 40 of the Radio and Television Law No. 28278) against the content that violates it.

In 2018, Latina announced it had secured the broadcasting rights for the 2022 FIFA World Cup for Peru, intending to air all matches on the free-to-air network. However, in 2022, Latina faced criticism for not broadcasting some of the 64 matches of the tournament.
