= List of comedy films of the 2020s =

A list of comedy films originally released in the 2020s. Often there may be considerable overlap particularly between comedy and other genres (including, teen, adult, romance, drama, animation, and action); the list should attempt to document films which are more closely related to comedy, even if they bend genres.

== 2020 ==
Title	Director	Cast	Country	Subgenres/notes
1 Night in San Diego	Penelope Lawson	Jenna Ushkowitz, Laura Ashley Samuels, Eric Nelsen, Mark Lawson, Nicolas DiPierro, Kelsey Douglas, Alexandra Daddario	United States	
3 Monkeys	Anil Kumar G	Sudigali Sudheer, Getup Srinu, Auto Ram Prasad, Shakalaka Shankar, Karunya Chowdary, Kautilya	India	Comedy-Drama
23 Walks	Paul Morrison	Alison Steadman, Dave Johns, Graham Cole, Bob Goody	United Kingdom	Comedy-Drama
Airplane Mode	César Rodrigues	Larissa Manoela, Erasmo Carlos, Katiuscia Canoro, André Frambach	Brazil	
An American Pickle	Brandon Trost	Seth Rogen, Sarah Snook, Eliot Glazer	United States	Comedy-Drama
Bad Boys for Life	Adil & Bilall	Will Smith, Martin Lawrence, Paola Núñez, Vanessa Hudgens, Alexander Ludwig, Charles Melton, Jacob Scipio, Kate del Castillo, Nicky Jam, Joe Pantoliano	United States	Action Comedy
Bad Trip	Kitao Sakurai	Eric André, Lil Rel Howery, Tiffany Haddish	United States	
Berlin, Berlin	Franziska Meyer Price	Felicitas Woll, Jan Sosniok, Matthias Klimsa	Germany	
Bheeshma	Venky Kudumula	Nithiin, Rashmika Mandanna	India	Action Romantic Comedy
Bill & Ted Face the Music	Dean Parisot	Keanu Reaves, Alex Winter, Kristen Schaal, Samara Weaving, Brigette Lundy-Paine, Anthony Carrigan, Erinn Hayes, Jayma Mays, Holland Taylor, Kid Cudi, William Sadler, Jillian Bell	United States	
Birds of Prey	Cathy Yan	Margot Robbie, Mary Elizabeth Winstead, Jurnee Smollett-Bell, Rosie Perez	United States	Action Comedy
Blithe Spirit	Edward Hall	Dan Stevens, Leslie Mann, Isla Fisher, Judi Dench, Emilia Fox, Julian Rhind-Tutt, Adil Ray, Michele Dotrice, Aimee-Ffion Edwards	United Kingdom	
Borat Subsequent Moviefilm	Jason Woliner	Sacha Baron Cohen, Maria Bakalova	United States	
Chick Fight	Paul Leyden	Malin Åkerman, Alec Baldwin, Bella Thorne	United States	Action Comedy
Coastal Elites	Jay Roach	Bette Midler, Sarah Paulson, Kaitlyn Dever, Dan Levy, Issa Rae	United States	
Cocktail	Ra.Vijaya Murugan	Yogi Babu, Rashmi Gopinath, Mithun Maheswaran, Sayaji Shinde, KPY Bala, Kawin	India	
Coffee & Kareem	Michael Dowse	Ed Helms, Terrence Little Gardenhigh, Betty Gilpin, RonReaco Lee, Andrew Bachelor, David Alan Grier, Taraji P. Henson	United States	Action Comedy
Coolie No. 1	David Dhawan	Varun Dhawan, Sara Ali Khan	India	
Crazy Awesome Teachers	Sammaria Simanjuntak	Gading Marten, Boris Bokir, Kevin Ardilova	Indonesia	Comedy-Drama
Curveball	Johannes Naber	Sebastian Blomberg, Dar Salim, Virginia Kull	Germany	
Downhill	Nat Faxon, Jim Rash	Julia Louis-Dreyfus, Will Ferrell	United States	Comedy-Drama
Emma	Autumn de Wilde	Anya Taylor-Joy, Johnny Flynn, Josh O'Connor, Callum Turner, Mia Goth, Miranda Hart, Bill Nighy	United Kingdom	Romantic Comedy
Enter the Fat Dragon	Kenji Tanigaki, Wong Jing	Donnie Yen, Teresa Mo, Wong Jing, Niki Chow	China	Martial arts comedy
Feel the Beat	Elissa Down	Sofia Carson, Enrico Colantoni, Wolfgang Novogratz	United States	Comedy-Drama
Friend of the World	Brian Patrick Butler	Nick Young, Alexandra Slade, Michael C. Burgess, Kathryn Schott, Kevin Smith, Luke Pensabene, Neil Raymond Ricco	United States	Sci-Fi Horror Comedy
The SpongeBob Movie: Sponge on the Run	Tim Hill	Tom Kenny, Awkwafina, Matt Berry, Clancy Brown, Rodger Bumpass, Snoop Dogg, Bill Fagerbakke, Tiffany Haddish, Carolyn Lawrence, Mr. Lawrence, Keanu Reeves, Danny Trejo, Reggie Watts	United States	Animated adventure comedy
Godmothered	Sharon Maguire	Jillian Bell, Isla Fisher, Jane Curtin, Jillian Shea Spaeder, Willa Skye, Mary Elizabeth Ellis, Santiago Cabrera, Artemis Pebdani, Utkarsh Ambudkar, Stephanie Weir, June Squibb, Carlease Burke.	United States	Fantasy Comedy
Guns Akimbo	Jason Lei Howden	Daniel Radcliffe, Samara Weaving, Natasha Liu Bordizzo, Grant Bowler	New Zealand, United Kingdom, Germany	Action Comedy
Hubie Halloween	Steven Brill	Adam Sandler, Kevin James, Julie Bowen, Ray Liotta, Rob Schneider, June Squibb, Kenan Thompson, Shaquille O'Neal, Steve Buscemi, Maya Rudolph	United States	
Impractical Jokers: The Movie	Chris Henchy	Brian Quinn, James Murray, Sal Vulcano, Joe Gatto	United States	
Like a Boss	Miguel Arteta	Tiffany Haddish, Rose Byrne, Jennifer Coolidge, Billy Porter, Salma Hayek	United States	
Magic Camp	Mark Waters	Adam Devine, Jeffrey Tambor, Gillian Jacobs	United States	
Mighty Oak	Sean McNamara	Janel Parrish, Alexa PenaVega, Carlos PenaVega, Raven-Symoné, Levi Dylan, Tommy Ragen	United States	Comedy-drama
My Spy	Peter Segal	Dave Bautista, Chloe Coleman, Kristen Schaal, Ken Jeong	United States	
Naan Sirithal	Raana	Hiphop Tamizha, Iswarya Menon, K. S. Ravikumar	India	
Ok, It's Fine…	Gabriela Ivette Sandoval	Roberto Andrade Ceron, Isabella Argudín, Ángel Alvarado, Gabriela de Corzo, Fermín Martínez, Juan Heladio, Pepe Návar	Mexico	Black-and-white Comedy-Drama
On the Rocks	Sofia Coppola	Bill Murray, Rashida Jones, Marlon Wayans	United States	Comedy-Drama
Over the Moon	Glen Keane, John Kahrs	Cathy Ang, Robert G Chiu, Phillipa Soo, Ken Jeong, John Cho, Ruthie Ann Miles, Sandra Oh, Margaret Cho, Kimiko Glenn, Artt Butler	United States, China	Animated Family Fantasy Comedy
Palm Springs	Max Barbakow	Andy Samberg, Cristin Milioti, Peter Gallagher, J. K. Simmons	United States	Sci-Fi Romantic Comedy
Players	Pyi Hein Thiha	Myint Myat, Htun Htun, Tyron Bejay, Khin Hlaing, Soe Myat Thuzar, Ei Chaw Po, May Mi Ko Ko, Hsaung Wutyee May	Myanmar	Comedy-Drama
Reboot Camp	Ivo Raza	David Koechner, Ed Begley Jr., Ja Rule, Chaz Bono, David Lipper, Lindsey Shaw, Shar Jackson	United States	
Romulo & Julita	Daniel Martín Rodríguez	Mónica Sánchez, Miguel Iza, Mayella Lloclla, Pietro Sibille	Peru	Romantic Comedy
Sarileru Neekevvaru	Anil Ravipudi	Mahesh Babu, Rashmika Mandanna, Vijayashanti, Prakash Raj, Rajendra Prasad	India	Action Comedy
Scoob!	Tony Cervone	Frank Welker, Will Forte, Gina Rodriguez, Zac Efron, Amanda Seyfried, Kiersey Clemons, Mark Wahlberg, Ken Jeong, Jason Isaacs, Tracy Morgan	United States	Animated Movie
Seriously Single	Katleho Ramaphakela, Rethabile Ramaphakela	Fulu Mugovhani, Tumi Morake, Bohang Moeko	South Africa	
Sí, mi amor	Pedro Flores Maldonado	Yiddá Eslava, Julián Zucchi, Andrés Salas, Magdyel Ugaz, Pietro Sibille, Saskia Bernaola, Sebastián Monteghirfo, Mayra Couto, Santiago Suárez, Ximena Palomino	Peru	Romantic Comedy
Sonic the Hedgehog	Jeff Fowler	James Marsden, Ben Schwartz, Tika Sumpter, Jim Carrey	United States	Action Comedy
Soul	Pete Docter	Jamie Foxx, Tina Fey, Questlove, Phylicia Rashad, Daveed Diggs, Angela Bassett	United States	Animated Fantasy comedy-drama
Spenser Confidential	Peter Berg	Mark Wahlberg, Winston Duke, Alan Arkin, Iliza Shlesinger, Bokeem Woodbine, Marc Maron, Post Malone	United States	Action comedy
Superintelligence	Ben Falcone	Melissa McCarthy, Bobby Cannavale, Brian Tyree Henry, James Corden	United States	Action Romantic Comedy
The Croods: A New Age	Joel Crawford	Nicolas Cage, Emma Stone, Ryan Reynolds, Catherine Keener, Clark Duke, Cloris Leachman, Peter Dinklage, Leslie Mann, Kelly Marie Tran	United States	Animated Comedy
The Gentlemen	Guy Ritchie	Matthew McConaughey, Charlie Hunnam, Henry Golding, Michelle Dockery	United Kingdom, United States	Action Comedy
The King of Staten Island	Judd Apatow	Pete Davidson, Marisa Tomei, Bill Burr, Bel Powley, Maude Apatow, Steve Buscemi	United States	Comedy-Drama
The Kissing Booth 2	Vince Marcello	Joey King, Joel Courtney, Jacob Elordi, Maisie Richardson-Sellers, Taylor Zakhar Perez, Molly Ringwald	United States	Romantic Comedy
The Lovebirds	Michael Showalter	Issa Rae, Kumail Nanjiani, Paul Sparks, Anna Camp, Kyle Bornheimer	United States	Romantic Comedy
The Opening Act	Steve Byrne	Jimmy O. Yang, Alex Moffat, Cedric the Entertainer, Neal Brennan, Bill Burr, Whitney Cummings, Jermaine Fowler, Ken Jeong, Russell Peters, Debby Ryan	United States	
The Players	Stefano Mordini	Riccardo Scamarcio, Valerio Mastandrea, Laura Chiatti	Italy	
The Princess Switch: Switched Again	Michael Rohl	Vanessa Hudgens, Sam Palladio, Nick Sagar	United States	Romantic Comedy
The Prom	Ryan Murphy	Meryl Streep, James Corden, Nicole Kidman, Keegan-Michael Key, Andrew Rannells, Ariana DeBose, Kerry Washington, Jo Ellen Pellman	United States	Musical Comedy
The Restoration	Alonso Llosa	Paul Vega, Atilia Boschetti, Delfina Paredes, Pietro Sibille, Muki Sabogal	Peru	
The Sleepover	Trish Sie	Sadie Stanley, Maxwell Simkins, Cree Cicchino, Lucas Jaye, Ken Marino, Joe Manganiello, Malin Åkerman	United States	Action Comedy
The Thing About Harry	Peter Paige, Joshua Senter	Jake Borelli, Niko Terho, Britt Baron, Karamo Brown, Peter Paige	United States	Romantic Comedy
The Wrong Missy	Tyler Spindel	David Spade, Lauren Lapkus, Nick Swardson, Geoff Pierson, Jackie Sandler, Sarah Chalke, Rob Schneider, Chris Witaske, Joe "Roman Reigns" Anoai, Molly Sims	United States	
Timmy Failure: Mistakes Were Made	Tom McCarthy	Winslow Fegley, Ophelia Lovibond, Craig Robinson, Wallace Shawn	United States	Children's comedy
To All the Boys: P.S. I Still Love You	Michael Fimognari	Lana Condor, Noah Centineo, Jordan Fisher, Anna Cathcart, Janel Parrish, Ross Butler, Madeleine Arthur, Emilija Baranac, Trezzo Mahoro, Holland Taylor, Sarayu Blue, John Corbett	United States	Romantic Comedy
Tolo Tolo	Luca Medici	Checco Zalone, Souleymane Sylla, Manda Touré, Nassor Said Birya, Barbara Bouchet	Italy	
Trolls: World Tour	Walt Dohrn	Anna Kendrick, Justin Timberlake, Rachel Bloom, James Corden, Ron Funches, Kelly Clarkson, Anderson .Paak, Sam Rockwell, George Clinton, Mary J. Blige	United States	Animated Musical Comedy
Valley Girl	Rachel Lee Goldenberg	Jessica Rothe, Josh Whitehouse, Mae Whitman, Judy Greer, Alicia Silverstone	United States	Musical Romantic Comedy
The War with Grandpa	Tim Hill	Robert De Niro, Oakes Fegley, Uma Thurman, Rob Riggle, Laura Marano, Cheech Marin, Jane Seymour, Christopher Walken	United States	
Work It	Laura Terruso	Sabrina Carpenter, Liza Koshy, Keiynan Lonsdale, Michelle Buteau, Jordan Fisher	United States	

== 2021 ==
Title	Director	Cast	Country	Subgenres/notes
14 Phere	Devanshu Singh	Vikrant Massey, Kriti Kharbanda	India	Romantic Comedy
Aaraattu	B. Unnikrishnan	Mohanlal	India	Action Comedy
Barb and Star Go to Vista Del Mar	Josh Greenbaum	Kristen Wiig, Annie Mumolo, Jamie Dornan, Wendi McLendon-Covey, Damon Wayans Jr.	United States	
Bhool Bhulaiyaa 2	Anees Bazmee	Kartik Aaryan, Tabu, Kiara Advani	India	Horror Comedy
Big Red Envelope	Li Kelong	Bao Bei'er, Clara Lee	China	Romantic comedy
Breaking News in Yuba County	Tate Taylor	Allison Janney, Mila Kunis, Regina Hall, Awkwafina, Wanda Sykes, Juliette Lewis	United States	
Clifford the Big Red Dog	Walt Becker	Darby Camp, Jack Whitehall, David Alan Grier, Kenan Thompson, Rosie Perez, John Cleese	United States	Family Comedy
Coming 2 America	Craig Brewer	Eddie Murphy, Arsenio Hall, Jermaine Fowler, Leslie Jones, Tracy Morgan, KiKi Layne, Shari Headley, John Amos, Teyana Taylor, Wesley Snipes, James Earl Jones	United States	
Cop Secret	Hannes Þór Halldórsson	Auðunn Blöndal, Egill Einarsson, Björn Hlynur Haraldsson and Steinunn Ólína Þorsteinsdóttir	Iceland	Action comedy
Doblemente embarazada	Eduardo Mendoza de Echave	Carolina Cano, Andrés Wiese, Nicolás Galindo, Daniela Camaiora	Peru	
Don't Look Up	Adam McKay	Jennifer Lawrence, Leonardo DiCaprio, Cate Blanchett, Rob Morgan, Meryl Streep, Jonah Hill, Himesh Patel, Timothée Chalamet, Ariana Grande, Scott Mescudi, Matthew Perry, Tomer Sisley, Tyler Perry, Melanie Lynskey, Ron Perlman, Chris Evans	United States	
Fatherhood	Paul Weitz	Kevin Hart, Alfre Woodard, Lil Rel Howery, DeWanda Wise, Anthony Carrigan, Paul Reiser	United States	Comedy-Drama
Flora & Ulysses	Lena Khan	Matilda Lawler, Alyson Hannigan, Ben Schwartz, Benjamin Evan Ainsworth, Danny Pudi	United States	Family Comedy
Free Guy	Shawn Levy	Ryan Reynolds, Jodie Comer, Joe Keery, Utkarsh Ambudkar, Taika Waititi	United States	Action Comedy
Ghostbusters: Afterlife	Jason Reitman	Carrie Coon, Finn Wolfhard, Mckenna Grace, Paul Rudd, Dan Aykroyd, Bill Murray, Ernie Hudson	United States	
Good on Paper	Kimmy Gatewood	Iliza Shlesinger, Ryan Hansen, Margaret Cho, Rebecca Rittenhouse	United States	
He's All That	Mark Waters	Addison Rae, Tanner Buchanan, Myra Molloy, Madison Pettis, Peyton Meyer, Isabella Crovetti, Rachael Leigh Cook, Annie Jacob	United States	Romantic Comedy
Hi, Mom	Jia Ling	Jia Ling, Shen Teng, Chen He, Zhang Xiaofei	China	
Paw Patrol: The Movie	Cal Brunker	Iain Armitage, Marsai Martin, Yara Shahidi, Kim Kardashian, Randall Park, Dax Shepard, Jimmy Kimmel	Canada	Action-adventure comedy
Home Sweet Home Alone	Dan Mazer	Archie Yates, Ellie Kemper, Rob Delaney, Aisling Bea, Kenan Thompson, Pete Holmes, Ally Maki, Chris Parnell, Max Ivutin, Maddie Holliday, Aiden Wang, Allan Wang, Esther Povitsky, Jordan Carlos	United States	
Lady of the Manor	Justin Long, Christian Long	Melanie Lynskey, Judy Greer, Justin Long, Ryan Phillippe, Luis Guzmán, Patrick Duffy	United States	Fantasy Comedy
Locked Down	Doug Liman	Anne Hathaway, Chiwetel Ejiofor, Ben Stiller, Stephen Merchant, Dulé Hill, Jazmyn Simon, Mark Gatiss, Mindy Kaling, Ben Kingsley, Lucy Boynton	United States	Romantic Comedy
Medias hermanas	Ani Alva Helfer	Gianella Neyra, Magdyel Ugaz, Tiago Correa, Leonardo Torres Vilar, Nacho Di Marco, Thiago Vernal, Miguel Dávalos	Peru	
Peter Rabbit 2: The Runaway	Will Gluck	James Corden, Elizabeth Debicki, Margot Robbie, Aimee Horne, Colin Moody, Domhnall Gleeson, Rose Byrne, David Oyelowo	United States	
Diary of a Wimpy Kid	Swinton Scott	Brady Noon, Ethan William Childress, Erica Cerra, Chris Diamantopoulos, Hunter Dillon	United States; Canada	Animated film
Princess DayaReese	Barry Gonzalez	Maymay Entrata, Edward Barber	Philippines	Romantic Comedy
Rang De	Venky Atluri	Nithiin, Keerthy Suresh	India	Romantic Comedy
Red Notice	Rawson Marshall Thurber	Dwayne Johnson, Ryan Reynolds, Gal Gadot,	United States	Action Comedy
Ron's Gone Wrong	Sarah Smith and Jean-Philippe Vine	Jack Dylan Grazer, Zach Galifianakis, Ed Helms, Justice Smith, Rob Delaney, Kylie Cantrall, Ricardo Hurtado and Olivia Colman	United Kingdom; United States; India	Animated satirical science fiction comedy
Rumble	Hamish Grieve	Will Arnett, Terry Crews, Geraldine Viswanathan, Joe "Roman Reigns" Anoa'i, Tony Danza, Becky Lynch, Susan Kelechi Watson, Stephen A. Smith, Jimmy Tatro, Ben Schwartz	United States	Animated Comedy
Sing 2	Garth Jennings	Matthew McConaughey, Reese Witherspoon, Seth MacFarlane, Scarlett Johansson, Nick Kroll, Taron Egerton, Tori Kelly	United States	Animated Musical Comedy
South Park: Post Covid	Trey Parker; Matt Stone	Trey Parker, Matt Stone	United States	Animated comedy TV-movie
South Park: Post COVID: The Return of COVID	Trey Parker; Matt Stone	Trey Parker, Matt Stone	United States	Animated comedy TV-movie
Space Jam: A New Legacy	Malcolm D. Lee	LeBron James, Cedric Joe, Don Cheadle, Sonequa Martin-Green, Jeff Bergman, Eric Bauza, Zendaya, Bob Bergen, Candi Milo, Gabriel Iglesias, Fred Tatasciore, Jim Cummings, Paul Julian	United States	
The Addams Family 2	Greg Tiernan	Oscar Isaac, Charlize Theron, Chloë Grace Moretz, Javon Walton, Nick Kroll, Snoop Dogg, Bette Midler, Bill Hader	United States	Animated Comedy
The Boss Baby: Family Business	Tom McGrath	Alec Baldwin, James Marsden, Amy Sedaris, Ariana Greenblatt, Eva Longoria, Jimmy Kimmel, Lisa Kudrow, Jeff Goldblum	United States	Animated Family Comedy
The Hitman's Wife's Bodyguard	Patrick Hughes	Ryan Reynolds, Samuel L. Jackson, Salma Hayek, Frank Grillo, Richard E. Grant	United States	Action Comedy
The King's Man	Matthew Vaughn	Ralph Fiennes, Harris Dickinson, Gemma Arterton, Rhys Ifans	United States	Action Comedy
The Kissing Booth 3	Vince Marcello	Joey King, Joel Courtney, Jacob Elordi, Maisie Richardson-Sellers, Taylor Zakhar Perez, Molly Ringwald	United States	Romantic Comedy
The Last Mercenary	David Charhon	Jean-Claude Van Damme, Alban Ivanov, Assa Sylla, Samir Decazza	United States	Action Comedy
The Last Warrior: Root of Evil	Dmitriy Dyachenko	Viktor Khorinyak, Mila Sivatskaya, Ekaterina Vilkova, Elena Yakovleva, Konstantin Lavronenko, Sergey Burunov, Yelena Valyushkina, Kirill Zaytsev, Timofey Tribuntsev, Garik Kharlamov	Russia	Fantasy Comedy
The Last Warrior 3	Dmitriy Dyachenko	Viktor Khorinyak, Mila Sivatskaya, Ekaterina Vilkova, Elena Yakovleva, Konstantin Lavronenko, Sergey Burunov, Yelena Valyushkina, Kirill Zaytsev, Garik Kharlamov, Timofey Tribuntsev	Russia	Fantasy Comedy
The Princess Switch 3	Michael Rohl	Vanessa Hudgens, Sam Palladio, Nick Sagar	United States	Romantic Comedy
Red Rocket	Sean Baker	Simon Rex, Bree Elrod, Suzanna Son	United States	Dark comedy
The Starling	Theodore Melfi	Melissa McCarthy, Chris O'Dowd, Kevin Kline, Timothy Olyphant, Daveed Diggs, Skyler Gisondo, Loretta Devine, Laura Harrier, Rosalind Chao, Kimberly Quinn	United States	Fantasy Comedy-Drama
Thunder Force	Ben Falcone	Melissa McCarthy, Octavia Spencer, Pom Klementieff, Melissa Leo	United States	
To All the Boys: Always and Forever, Lara Jean	Michael Fimognari	Lana Condor, Noah Centineo	United States	Romantic Comedy
Tom and Jerry	Tim Story	William Hanna, Mel Blanc, June Foray, Chloë Grace Moretz, Michael Peña, Ken Jeong, Rob Delaney	United States	
Yes Day	Miguel Arteta	Jennifer Garner, Édgar Ramírez, Jenna Ortega	United States	
Werewolves Within	Josh Ruben	Sam Richardson, Michael Chernus, Michaela Watkins, Cheyenne Jackson, Milana Vayntrub, George Basil, Sarah Burns, Catherine Curtin, Wayne Duvall, Harvey Guillén, Rebecca Henderson	United States	Horror Comedy
Zombie Reddy	Prasanth Varma	Sajja Teja, Anandhi, Daksha Nagarkar	India	Horror Comedy

== 2022 ==
Title	Director	Cast	Country	Subgenre/notes
13: The Musical	Tamra Davis	Eli Golden, Frankie McNellis, JD McCrary, Josh Peck, Peter Hermann, Debra Messing, Rhea Perlman	United States	Musical comedy
A Man Called Otto	Marc Forster	Tom Hanks, Mariana Treviño, Rachel Keller, Manuel Garcia-Rulfo	United States	Comedy-Drama
About Fate	Maryus Vaysberg	Emma Roberts, Thomas Mann, Britt Robertson, Madelaine Petsch, Wendie Malick, Cheryl Hines, Lewis Tan	United States	Romantic Comedy
The Adam Project	Shawn Levy	Ryan Reynolds, Mark Ruffalo, Jennifer Garner, Walker Scobell, Catherine Keener, Zoe Saldaña	United States	Sci-Fi Action Comedy
Amsterdam	David O. Russell	Christian Bale, Margot Robbie, John David Washington, Chris Rock, Anya Taylor-Joy, Zoe Saldaña, Mike Myers, Michael Shannon, Timothy Olyphant, Andrea Riseborough, Taylor Swift, Matthias Schoenaerts, Alessandro Nivola, Rami Malek, Robert De Niro	United States	Mystery Comedy
Another Me	Gao Ke	Ma Li, Chang Yuan, Ai Lun, Wei Xiang	China	
Anything's Possible	Billy Porter	Eva Reign, Abubakr Ali, Renée Elise Goldsberry	United States	Romantic Comedy
Beavis and Butt-Head Do the Universe	John Rice, Albert Calleros	Mike Judge, Gary Cole, Nat Faxon, Chi McBride, Andrea Savage	United States	Animated Sci-Fi Comedy
Bhediya	Amar Kaushik	Varun Dhawan, Kriti Sanon, Deepak Dobriyal, Abhishek Banerjee	India	Horror Comedy
The Bob's Burgers Movie	Loren Bouchard	H. Jon Benjamin, Dan Mintz, Eugene Mirman, Larry Murphy, John Roberts, Kristen Schaal	United States	Animated Musical Comedy
Bros	Nicholas Stoller	Billy Eichner, Luke Macfarlane, Ts Madison, Miss Lawrence, Symone, Guillermo Diaz, Guy Branum	United States	
Cheaper by the Dozen	Gail Lerner	Gabrielle Union, Zach Braff, Erika Christensen	United States	Family Comedy
Chip 'n Dale: Rescue Rangers	Akiva Schaffer	John Mulaney, Andy Samberg, Will Arnett, Eric Bana, Keegan-Michael Key, Seth Rogen, J.K. Simmons, KiKi Layne	United States	
Cosas de amigos	Giovanni Ciccia	Rodrigo Sánchez Patiño, Bruno Ascenzo, Óscar López Arias, Gisela Ponce de León, Emilia Drago, Miguel Dávalos	Peru	
Diary of a Wimpy Kid: Rodrick Rules	Luke Cormican	Hunter Dillon, Brady Noon, Ethan William Childress, Chris Diamantopoulos, Erica Cerra	United States, Canada	Animated film
DC League of Super-Pets	Jared Stern	Dwayne Johnson, Kevin Hart, Kate McKinnon, John Krasinski, Vanessa Bayer, Natasha Lyonne, Diego Luna, Keanu Reeves	United States	Animated Superhero Comedy
Disenchanted	Adam Shankman	Amy Adams, Patrick Dempsey, James Marsden, Idina Menzel, Yvette Nicole Brown, Jayma Mays, Oscar Nunez, Maya Rudolph	United States	Musical Fantasy Romantic Comedy
Do Revenge	Jennifer Kaytin Robinson	Camila Mendes, Maya Hawke	United States	Dark comedy
Dog	Channing Tatum, Reid Carolin	Channing Tatum, Q'orianka Kilcher	United States	
Don't Call Me Spinster 2	Ani Alva Helfer	Patricia Barreto, André Silva	Peru	
The Ice Age Adventures of Buck Wild	John C. Donkin	Simon Pegg, Utkarsh Ambudkar, Justina Machado, Vincent Tong, Aaron Harris, Dominique Jennings, Jake Green, Sean Kenin Elias-Reyes, Skyler Stone	United States, Canada	Animated adventure comedy
Easter Sunday	Jay Chandrasekhar	Jo Koy	United States	
Encintados	Gianfranco Quattrini	Magdyel Ugaz, Ximena Palomino, Benjamín Amadeo	Peru, Argentina	Romantic comedy
Everything Everywhere All at Once	Daniel Kwan and Daniel Scheinert	Michelle Yeoh, Stephanie Hsu, Ke Huy Quan, Jenny Slate, Harry Shum Jr., James Hong, Jamie Lee Curtis	United States	Comedy-Drama
Hocus Pocus 2	Anne Fletcher	Bette Midler, Sarah Jessica Parker, Kathy Najimy, Sam Richardson, Doug Jones, Whitney Peak, Belissa Escobedo, Tony Hale, Hannah Waddingham	United States	
Hotel Transylvania: Transformania	Jennifer Kluska, Derek Drymon	Brian Hull, Andy Samberg, Selena Gomez, Kathryn Hahn, Keegan-Michael Key, Steve Buscemi, David Spade	United States	Animated Family Fantasy Comedy
It's a Fat World	Sandro Ventura	Micky Vargas, Daniela Feijoó, Renzo Schuller, Jesús Alzamora	Peru	Romantic Comedy
Honeymoon with My Mother	Paco Caballero	Carmen Machi, Quim Gutiérrez	Spain	
Jackass Forever	Jeff Tremaine	Johnny Knoxville, Steve-O, Jason "Wee Man" Acuña, Preston Lacy, Chris Pontius, Ehren McGhehey, Dave England	United States	
KillRoy Was Here	Kevin Smith	Azita Ghanizada, Ryan O'Nan, Harley Quinn Smith, Chris Jericho, Justin Kucsulain	United States	Horror Comedy
Kung Fu Ghost	Jennifer N. Linch	Jennifer N. Linch, Noah Sargent, Mark Atkinson, Amber Grayson, David S. Dawson, Whitney Wegman-Wood	United States	Action Comedy
La banda presidencial	Eduardo Mendoza de Echave	Emilram Cossio, Giovanni Ciccia, Andrés Salas, Haysen Percovich, Christian Ysla	Peru	Crime Comedy
Laal Singh Chaddha	Advait Chandan	Aamir Khan, Kareena Kapoor, Vijay Sethupathi	India	Comedy-Drama
Let's Tie the Knot, Honey!	Pedro Flores Maldonado	Yiddá Eslava, Julián Zucchi, Andrés Salas, Magdyel Ugaz, Pietro Sibille	Peru	Romantic Comedy
Luck	Peggy Holmes	Jane Fonda, Whoopi Goldberg	United States	Animated Fantasy Comedy
Marry Me	Kat Coiro	Jennifer Lopez, Owen Wilson, Maluma, John Bradley, Sarah Silverman	United States	Romantic Comedy
The Man from Toronto	Patrick Hughes	Kevin Hart, Woody Harrelson, Kaley Cuoco, Jasmine Mathews, Lela Loren, Pierson Fodé, Jencarlos Canela, Ellen Barkin	United States	Action Comedy
Me Time	John Hamburg	Kevin Hart, Mark Wahlberg, Regina Hall, Luis Gerardo Méndez, Jimmy O. Yang	United States	
Minions: The Rise of Gru	Kyle Balda, Jonathan del Val, Brad Ableson	Pierre Coffin, Steve Carell, Taraji P. Henson, Michelle Yeoh, RZA, Jean-Claude Van Damme, Lucy Lawless, Dolph Lundgren, Danny Trejo, Russell Brand, Julie Andrews, Alan Arkin	United States	Animated Comedy
My Best Friend's Exorcism	Damon Thomas	Elsie Fisher, Amiah Miller, Rachel Ogechi Kanu, Cathy Ang, Clayton Royal Johnson, Nathan Anderson, Cynthia Evans, Christopher Lowell	United States	Horror Comedy
Paws of Fury: The Legend of Hank	Rob Minkoff; Mark Koetsier	Michael Cera, Samuel L. Jackson, Ricky Gervais, Mel Brooks, George Takei, Djimon Hounsou, Michelle Yeoh, Cathy Shim, Kylie Kuioka, Gabriel Iglesias, Aasif Mandvi	United States, United Kingdom	Animated Comedy
Puss in Boots: The Last Wish	Joel Crawford	Antonio Banderas, Salma Hayek, Olivia Colman, Harvey Guillén, Samson Kayo, Wagner Moura, Anthony Mendez, John Mulaney, Florence Pugh, Da'Vine Joy Randolph, Ray Winstone	United States	Animated Fantasy Comedy
Rosaline	Karen Maine	Kaitlyn Dever, Isabela Merced, Kyle Allen, Bradley Whitford, Minnie Driver	United States	Romantic Comedy
Secret Headquarters	Henry Joost, Ariel Schulman	Owen Wilson, Michael Peña, Jesse Williams	United States	Superhero comedy
Senior Year	Alex Hardcastle	Rebel Wilson, Mary Holland, Sam Richardson, Zoë Chao, Justin Hartley, Chris Parnell	United States	
Sneakerella	Elizabeth Allen Rosenbaum	Chosen Jacobs, Lexi Underwood	United States	Musical Comedy
Sonic the Hedgehog 2	Jeff Fowler	Ben Schwartz, James Marsden, Tika Sumpter, Adam Pally, Natasha Rothwell, Shemar Moore, Jim Carrey	United States	Hybrid animation Action-adventure Comedy
South Park: The Streaming Wars	Trey Parker; Matt Stone	Trey Parker, Matt Stone	United States	Animated comedy
South Park: The Streaming Wars Part 2	Trey Parker; Matt Stone	Trey Parker, Matt Stone	United States	Animated comedy
Spirited	Sean Anders	Will Ferrell, Ryan Reynolds, Octavia Spencer	United States	Musical Comedy
Sugar en aprietos	José Salinas	Alessandra Fuller, David Zepeda, Patricia Portocarrero, Yvonne Frayssinet, Maju Mantilla, Andrés Vílchez, Joaquín Escobar, Andrea Luna, Haydeé Cáceres, Olga Zumarán, Kukuli Morante, Valeria Piazza, Austin Palao, Ricardo Rondón, Tito Vega, Leslie Stewart, Javier Valdés, José Dammert, Matías Raygada, Mariano Ramírez	Peru	
Tall Girl 2	Emily Ting	Ava Michelle, Griffin Gluck, Sabrina Carpenter, Anjelika Washington, Luke Eisner, Clara Wilsey, Rico Paris, Jan Luis Castellanos, Angela Kinsey, Steve Zahn	United States	Romantic Comedy
The Bad Guys	Pierre Perifel	Sam Rockwell, Awkwafina, Anthony Ramos, Marc Maron, Craig Robinson, Zazie Beetz, Lilly Singh, Alex Borstein, Richard Ayoade	United States	Animated Comedy
The Monroy Affaire	Josué Méndez	Damián Alcázar, María Zubiri, Olivia Manrufo, Maryloly López, Grapa Paola, Liliana Trujillo, Lia Camilo, Wendy Vázquez	Peru, Argentina	Black comedy, tragicomedy
The Out-Laws	Tyler Spindel	Adam Devine, Pierce Brosnan, Ellen Barkin, Nina Dobrev, Michael Rooker, Poorna Jagannathan, Julie Hagerty, Richard Kind, Lil Rel Howery, Blake Anderson	United States	Action Comedy
The Takedown	Louis Leterrier	Omar Sy, Laurent Lafitte, Izïa Higelin	France	Action Comedy
The Valet	Richard Wong	Eugenio Derbez, Samara Weaving	United States	Romantic Comedy
Thor: Love and Thunder	Taika Waititi	Chris Hemsworth, Tessa Thompson, Natalie Portman, Christian Bale, Chris Pratt, Jaimie Alexander, Pom Klementieff, Dave Bautista, Karen Gillan	United States	Superhero Action Comedy Fantasy
Ticket to Paradise	Ol Parker	George Clooney, Julia Roberts, Kaitlyn Dever, Billie Lourd	United States	Romantic Comedy
Too Cool to Kill	Xing Wenxiong	Wei Xiang, Ma Li	China	Action Comedy Thriller
Wendell & Wild	Henry Selick	Keegan-Michael Key, Jordan Peele, Lyric Ross, Angela Bassett, James Hong, Sam Zelaya, Tamara Smart, Seema Virdi, Ramona Young, Ving Rhames	United States	Stop-Motion Animation Dark Fantasy Horror Comedy
When You Finish Saving the World	Jesse Eisenberg	Finn Wolfhard, Julianne Moore, Alisha Boe, Jay O. Sanders, Eleonore Hendricks	United States	Comedy-drama
Where's the Right Girl	Daniel Vega	César Ritter, Magdyel Ugaz, Vadhir Derbez, Fiorella Pennano, Gustavo Bueno, Grapa Paola	Peru	
White Noise	Noah Baumbach	Adam Driver, Greta Gerwig, Don Cheadle	United States	Comedy-Drama
Who Said Detox?	Rosa María Santisteban	Luciana Blomberg, Jimena Lindo, Korina Rivadeneira, Maju Mantilla, Gachi Rivero, Andrés Vilchez, Francisco Andrade, Ximena Rodríguez	Peru	
Violent Night	Tommy Wirkola	David Harbour, John Leguizamo, Alex Hassell, Alexis Louder, Beverly D'Angelo	United States	Christmas action black comedy
Better Nate Than Ever	Tim Federle	Aria Brooks, Joshua Bassett, Michelle Federer, Rueby Wood, Norbert Leo Butz, Lisa Kudrow	United States	Musical comedy
Willaq Pirqa, the Cinema of My Village	César Galindo	Víctor Acurio, Hermelinda Luján, Melisa Álvarez, Alder Yaurisaca	Peru, Bolivia	Comedy-Drama

== 2023 ==
Title	Director	Cast	Country	Subgenre/notes
¡Asu mare! Los amigos	Carlos Alcántara	Andrés Salas, Franco Cabrera, Emilram Cossio, Miguel Vergara	Peru	
Aunt Virginia	Fabio Meira	Vera Holtz, Arlete Salles, Louise Cardoso, Vera Valdez, Daniela Fontan, Iuri Saraiva, Antônio Pitanga, Amanda Lyra	Brazil	Comedy-Drama
Ant-Man and the Wasp: Quantumania	Peyton Reed	Paul Rudd, Michael Douglas, Evangeline Lilly, Michelle Pfeiffer, Jonathan Majors, Kathryn Newton	United States	Action science Fantasy Comedy
Anyone but You	Will Gluck	Sydney Sweeney, Glen Powell, Alexandra Shipp, GaTa	United States	Romantic comedy
Are You There God? It's Me, Margaret.	Kelly Fremon Craig	Rachel McAdams, Abby Ryder Fortson, Kathy Bates	United States	Comedy-Drama
Bad Behaviour	Alice Englert	Jennifer Connelly, Alice Englert, Dasha Nekrasova	New Zealand	
Barbie	Greta Gerwig	Margot Robbie, Ryan Gosling, America Ferrera	United States, United Kingdom	Fantasy Comedy
Beau Is Afraid	Ari Aster	Joaquin Phoenix, Nathan Lane, Patti LuPone, Amy Ryan, Kylie Rogers, Parker Posey, Stephen McKinley Henderson, Hayley Squires, Michael Gandolfini, Zoe Lister-Jones, Richard Kind	United States	Horror Comedy
Ben & Lacy	Michael Shacket	Morgan Overley, Michael Shacket, Carolyn Trahan, ShaShaty, Meigan Moncus, Jaycob Maya, Will Spencer, Carolyne Weiss, Stephen Neider, Sheil Choksi, Bobby Freeman and Matthew J. Tucker	United States	Romantic Comedy
Leo	Robert Marianetti, Robert Smigel, David Wachtenheim	Adam Sandler, Bill Burr, Cecily Strong, Jason Alexander	United States	Musical comedy
Bottoms	Emma Seligman	Rachel Sennott, Ayo Edebiri, Marshawn Lynch, Ruby Cruz, Havana Rose Liu, Kaia Gerber, Nicholas Galitzine, Miles Fowler, Dagmara Dominczyk, Punkie Johnson	United States	Teen sex comedy
Candy Cane Lane	Reginald Hudlin	Eddie Murphy, Tracee Ellis Ross, Robin Thede, Nick Offerman, Jillian Bell, Chris Redd	United States	
Champions	Bobby Farrelly	Woody Harrelson, Kaitlin Olson, Ernie Hudson	United States	Comedy-Drama
Chef Jack: The Adventurous Cook	Guilherme Fiúza Zenha	Danton Mello, Rodrigo Waschburger, Cintia Ferrer, Cecilia Fernandes, Renan Rammé, Álvaro Rosacosta, Tássia D'Paula, Guilherme Briggs, Rejane Faria, Marisa Rotenberg, Ana Laura Salles, Renata Corrêa, Carlos Magno Ribeiro, Giordano Becheleni	Brazil	Adventure-Comedy
Cocaine Bear	Elizabeth Banks	Keri Russell, Alden Ehrenreich, O'Shea Jackson Jr.	United States	Horror Comedy
Diary of a Wimpy Kid Christmas: Cabin Fever	Luke Cormican	Wesley Kimmel, Spencer Howell, Erica Cerra, Hunter Dillon, Chris Diamantopoulos	United States, Canada	Animated Christmas comedy
Daaaaaalí!	Quentin Dupieux	Gilles Lellouche, Anaïs Demoustier, Édouard Baer, Jonathan Cohen, Pio Marmaï, Didier Flamand	France	
Dashing Through the Snow	Tim Story	Lil Rel Howery, Chris "Ludacris" Bridges, Madison Skye Validum, Teyonah Parris, Oscar Nunez	United States	
Dream Girl 2	Raaj Shaandilyaa	Ayushmann Khurrana, Ananya Panday, Paresh Rawal	India	Comedy-Drama
Dungeons & Dragons: Honor Among Thieves	John Francis Daley, Jonathan Goldstein	Chris Pine, Michelle Rodriguez, Justice Smith, Regé-Jean Page, Hugh Grant, Sophia Lillis	United States	Action-adventure Fantasy Comedy
El Año del Tigre	Yasser Michelén	Carlos Alcántara, Wendy Ramos, Frank Perozo, Gonzalo Torres, Andrea Sofia Pimentel, Jossi Martínez, Salvador Perez Martinez, Nashla Bogaert, Luinis Olaverria, Vicente Santos, Ana Maria Arias	Peru. Dominican Republic	Crime Comedy
Family Switch	McG	Jennifer Garner, Ed Helms, Emma Myers, Brady Noon	United States	
Five Hundred Miles	Su Lun	Lei Jiayin, Zhang Xiaofei, Zhang Youhao	China	Fantasy comedy
Fool's Paradise	Charlie Day	Charlie Day, Ken Jeong, Kate Beckinsale, Adrien Brody, Jason Sudeikis, Edie Falco, Jason Bateman, Common, Ray Liotta	United States	
Freedom, Wisconsin	Molly Preston	Aimee La Joie, Stephen George, Melissa Shoshahi, Michelle Renee Thompson, Cory Hardin, Jessica Ambuehl, Richard Baiker, John Clark	United States	
Good Burger 2	Phil Traill	Kenan Thompson, Kel Mitchell, Jillian Bell, Lil Rel Howery	United States	
Guardians of the Galaxy Vol. 3	James Gunn	Chris Pratt, Zoe Saldaña, Dave Bautista, Vin Diesel, Bradley Cooper, Karen Gillan, Pom Klementieff, Elizabeth Debicki, Sean Gunn, Sylvester Stallone, Will Poulter, Chukwudi Iwuji, Maria Bakalova	United States	Superhero Comedy
Haunted Mansion	Justin Simien	LaKeith Stanfield, Rosario Dawson, Owen Wilson, Danny Devito, Tiffany Haddish, Jamie Lee Curtis	United States	Horror Comedy
Hemet, or the Landlady Don't Drink Tea	Tony Olmos	Kimberly Weinberger, Brian Patrick Butler, Aimee La Joie, Randy Davison, Merrick McCartha, Matthew Rhodes, Nick Young, Pierce Wallace, Derrick Acosta, Mark Atkinson	United States	Dark Comedy
The Holdovers	Alexander Payne	Paul Giamatti, Dominic Sessa, Da'Vine Joy Randolph	United States	Comedy-Drama
How to Deal With a Heartbreak	Joanna Lombardi	Gisela Ponce de León, Karina Jordán, Jely Reátegui, Christopher von Uckermann, Carlos Carlín, Jason Day, Andrés Salas, Salvador del Solar, Norma Martínez, Ana María Orozco	Peru, Argentina	
It's a Wonderful Knife	Tyler MacIntyre	Jane Widdop, Joel McHale, Katharine Isabelle, Justin Long	United States	Christmas comedy-horror
La peor de mis bodas 3	Adolfo Aguilar	Gabriel Soto, Laura Zapata, Maricarmen Marín, Ismael La Rosa, Milett Figueroa, Thiago Vernal, Carlos Casella, Francisco Cabrera, Canela China y Fernando Bakovic	Peru	
Like or Die	Carlos Campos-Santos	Mónica Huarte, Renata Molinar, Diana Carreiro, Memo Dorantes, Macarena García, Leonardo Daniel, Bárbara Lombardo, Mau Nieto, Daniela Peña, Sandra Burgos, Christian Uribe, Michelle Durán, Ángel Escarcega, Michael Cohn, Alejandro de la Madrid, Paola Rojas	Mexico	Satirical black comedy thriller
Little Red Riding Wolf	Chus Gutiérrez	Marta González de Vega, Berto Romero, David Guapo, José Mota, Antonio Resines, Elena Irureta, Melania Urbina, Marco Zunino	Spain, Peru	
Spy Kids: Armageddon	Robert Rodriguez	Gina Rodriguez, Zachary Levi, Connor Esterson, Everly Carganilla, D. J. Cotrona, Billy Magnussen	United States	Spy action comedy
Migration	Benjamin Renner	Kumail Nanjiani, Elizabeth Banks, Keegan-Michael Key, Awkwafina, Danny DeVito	United States	Animated Comedy
Murder Mystery 2	Jeremy Garelick	Adam Sandler, Jennifer Aniston	United States	Mystery comedy
Next Goal Wins	Taika Waititi	Michael Fassbender, Elisabeth Moss, Kaimana, Beulah Koale, Rachel House, Uli Latukefu, Rhys Darby, Will Arnett	United States	Comedy-Drama
Night Courier	Ali Kalthami	Mohamad Aldokhei, Mohammed Altawyan, Hajar Alshammari, Sarah Taibah, Abdullah Ahmad, Mohammed Algarawi, Layla Malik, Morouj, Abo Salu	Saudi Arabia	Black comedy, crime comedy, comedy thriller
No Hard Feelings	Gene Stupnitsky	Jennifer Lawrence, Andrew Barth Feldman, Laura Benanti, Matthew Broderick, Ebon Moss-Bachrach, Kyle Mooney, Hasan Minhaj, Alysia Joy Powell	United States	
No vayan!!	Roger Asto León	Pablo 'Melcochita' Villanueva and Miguel Barraza	Peru	
Old Dads	Bill Burr	Bill Burr, Bobby Cannavale, Bokeem Woodbine	United States	
Pirú: A Golden Journey	Bismarck Rojas	Emmanuel Soriano, Andrés Salas, Mateo Castrejón, María Teresa Tello, Pedro Olórtegui, Laura Adrianzén, Eliseo Arrieta, Martín Martínez	Peru	Comedy-Drama
Prohibido salir	Sandro Ventura	Anahí de Cárdenas, Renzo Schuller, Merly Morello, Facundo Vásquez de Velasco, Diego Lombardi, Laura Spoya, Maju Mantilla, Santiago Suárez, Luciana Fuster, Camucha Negrete, Fabiana Valcárcel, Fiorella Luna, David Carrillo, Liz Navarro, Alejandra Saba, Chiara Molina, Miguel Vargas	Peru	
Quiz Lady	Jessica Yu	Awkwafina, Sandra Oh, Will Ferrell	United States	
Renfield	Chris McKay	Nicolas Cage, Nicholas Hoult, Awkwafina, Ben Schwartz, Adrian Martinez, Shohreh Aghdashloo, Bess Rous	United States	Horror Comedy
Robots	Ant Hines, Casper Christensen	Shailene Woodley, Jack Whitehall, Nick Rutherford	United States	Sci-Fi Romantic Comedy
Ruby Gillman, Teenage Kraken	Kirk DeMicco; Faryn Pearl	Lana Condor, Toni Collette, Annie Murphy, Colman Domingo, Liza Koshy, Jaboukie Young-White, Blue Chapman, Will Forte, Ramona Young, Eduardo Franco, Jane Fonda, Sam Richardson	United States	Animated teen comedy
Shazam! Fury of the Gods	David F. Sandberg	Zachary Levi, Asher Angel, Jack Dylan Grazer, Faithe Herman, Grace Fulton, Ian Chen, Jovan Armand, Marta Milans, Cooper Andrews, Rachel Zegler, Lucy Liu, Helen Mirren	United States	Superhero Fantasy Family Comedy
Shotgun Wedding	Jason Moore	Jennifer Lopez, Josh Duhamel, Jennifer Coolidge, Sonia Braga, Cheech Marin, D'Arcy Carden, Selena Tan, Lenny Kravitz, Desmin Borges, Alex Mallari Jr.	United States	Action, rom-com
Single, Married, Widowed, Divorced	Ani Alva Helfer	Gianella Neyra, Katia Condos, Milene Vásquez, Patricia Portocarrero	Peru	
Sophie's Rules	Maritza Brikisak and Christina Tsialtas	Maritza Brikisak, Saraphina Joachim, Keerthi Paikera, Lumen Beltran, Phil Trasolini, Marcio Moreno, Austin Trapp, Vince Song, Chelsea Thompson, Rohain Arora, Yvette Dudley-Neuman, Dan Zachary, Todd Hann, Justin Lacey, Kathryn Daniels, Seann Sheriland, Patrice Jefferson, Ian Crowe, Martin Cervantez, Mathew Fee, Joseph Findlay, Jen Hiltz, Nathaniel Postma, Abigail Snider, Ava Trasolini and Vader the Dog	Canada and the USA	Comedy-Drama
Spider-Man: Across the Spider-Verse	Joaquim Dos Santos, Kemp Powers, Justin K. Thompson	Oscar Isaac, Shameik Moore, Hailee Steinfeld, Jake Johnson, Brian Tyree Henry, Luna Lauren Vélez, Issa Rae, Jason Schwartzman	United States	Animated Superhero Comedy
South Park: Joining the Panderverse	Trey Parker	Trey Parker	United States	Animated comedy
South Park (Not Suitable for Children)	Trey Parker	Trey Parker	United States	Animated comedy
Soy inocente	Pedro Flores Maldonado	Yiddá Eslava, Mariella Zanetti, Yarlo Ruiz, Rodolfo Carrión, Édgar Vivar, Pietro Sibille, Patricia Portocarrero, Eva Ayllón, Jorge Mena	Peru	Comedy mystery
Stormy Lola	Agustí Villaronga	Susi Sánchez, Joel Gálvez, Mor Ngom, Celso Bugallo	Spain	Comedy-Drama
Strays	Josh Greenbaum	Will Ferrell, Jamie Foxx, Will Forte	United States	
Summer Vacation	Santiago Segura	Leo Harlem, Santiago Segura, Patricia Conde	Spain	
Teenage Mutant Ninja Turtles: Mutant Mayhem	Jeff Rowe	Micah Abbey, Shamon Brown Jr., Nicolas Cantu, Brady Noon, Jackie Chan, Hannibal Buress, Rose Byrne, John Cena, Ice Cube, Natasia Demetriou, Ayo Edebiri, Giancarlo Esposito, Post Malone, Seth Rogen, Paul Rudd, Maya Rudolph	United States	Animated Superhero comedy
The Erection of Toribio Bardelli	Adrián Saba	Gustavo Bueno, Gisela Ponce de León, Rodrigo Sánchez Patiño, Michele Abascal, Lucélia Santos	Peru, Brazil	Black comedy, tragicomedy
The Family Plan	Simon Cellan Jones	Mark Wahlberg, Michelle Monaghan	United States	Action comedy
The Last Laugh	Gonzalo Ladines	César Ritter, Gisela Ponce de León, Gianfranco Brero, Giselle Collao, Daniel Menacho, Job Mansilla, Hernán Romero, Gabriela Velásquez	Peru	
The Movie	Max del Río	Martín Méndez, Asaf Berrón, Jorge Castro Realpozo, Addy Arceo, Hernán Castelot, Francisco Elox, Juan Amaro	Mexico	
The Palace	Roman Polanski	Mickey Rourke, Joaquim de Almeida, John Cleese, Oliver Masucci, Fanny Ardant, Fortunato Cerlino, Alexander Petrov	Sweden	Black comedy
Paw Patrol: The Mighty Movie	Cal Brunker	Mckenna Grace, Taraji P. Henson, Marsai Martin, Christian Convery, Lil Rel Howery, Kim Kardashian, Chris Rock, Serena Williams, Alan Kim, Brice Gonzalez, North West, Saint West, James Marsden, Kristen Bell, Finn Lee-Epp	Canada	Animated action-adventure comedy
The Super Mario Bros. Movie	Aaron Horvath, Michael Jelenic	Chris Pratt, Anya Taylor-Joy, Charlie Day, Jack Black, Keegan-Michael Key, Seth Rogen, Fred Armisen, Kevin Michael Richardson, Sebastian Maniscalco, Charles Martinet	United States	Animated Action-adventure Comedy
Trolls Band Together	Walt Dohrn	Anna Kendrick, Justin Timberlake	United States	Animated Musical Fantasy Comedy
We Are Zombies	François Simard, Anouk Whissell, Yoann-Karl Whissell	Alexandre Nachi, Derek Johns, Megan Peta Hill	Canada, France	Horror Comedy
Yannick	Quentin Dupieux	Raphaël Quenard, Pio Marmaï, Blanche Gardin	France	Black comedy
You People	Kenya Barris	Jonah Hill, Lauren London, David Duchovny, Nia Long, Julia Louis-Dreyfus, Eddie Murphy	United States	Rom-com

== 2024 ==
Title	Director	Cast	Country	Subgenre/notes
¿Ahora somos 3? Sí, mi amor	Pedro Flores Maldonado	Yiddá Eslava, Julián Zucchi, Andrés Salas, Magdyel Ugaz, Pietro Sibille	Peru	Romantic comedy
Almost Popular	Nayip Ramos	Ruby Rose Turner, Reid Miller, Isabella Ferreira, Ellodee Carpenter, Elijah M. Cooper, Avi Angel, Arden Myrin, Kathleen Rose Perkins	United States	Coming of age
Argylle	Matthew Vaughn	Henry Cavill, Bryce Dallas Howard, Sam Rockwell	United Kingdom, United States	Action Comedy
Audrey	Natalie Bailey	Jackie van Beek, Jeremy Lindsay Taylor, Josephine Blazier, Hannah Diviney, Aaron Fa'aoso, Fraser Anderson	Australia	Black comedy
Saving Bikini Bottom: The Sandy Cheeks Movie	Liza Johnson	Carolyn Lawrence, Tom Kenny, Clancy Brown, Bill Fagerbakke, Mr. Lawrence, Rodger Bumpass, Johnny Knoxville, Craig Robinson, Grey DeLisle, Ilia Isorelýs Paulino, Matty Cardarople, Wanda Sykes	United States	Adventure comedy
Bad Boys: Ride or Die	Adil & Bilall	Will Smith, Martin Lawrence, Vanessa Hudgens, Alexander Ludwig, Paola Núñez, Eric Dane, Ioan Gruffudd, Jacob Scipio, Melanie Liburd, Tasha Smith	United States	Action Comedy
Beetlejuice Beetlejuice	Tim Burton	Michael Keaton, Winona Ryder, Catherine O'Hara, Jenna Ortega, Justin Theroux, Monica Bellucci, Willem Dafoe	United States	Fantasy Horror Comedy
Beverly Hills Cop: Axel F	Mark Molloy	Eddie Murphy, Joseph Gordon-Levitt, Taylour Paige, Judge Reinhold, John Ashton, Paul Reiser, Bronson Pinchot	United States	Action Comedy
Chosen Family	Heather Graham	Heather Graham, John Brotherton, Julia Stiles	United States	Comedy-drama
My Old Ass	Megan Park	Maisy Stella, Percy Hynes White, Maddie Ziegler, Kerrice Brooks, Aubrey Plaza	United States, Canada	Coming of age
The Day the Earth Blew Up: A Looney Tunes Movie	Pete Browngardt	Eric Bauza, Candi Milo, Peter MacNicol, Fred Tatasciore, Laraine Newman, Wayne Knight	United States	Animated Sci-Fi Comedy film
Spellbound	Vicky Jenson	Rachel Zegler, John Lithgow, Jenifer Lewis, Tituss Burgess, Nathan Lane, Javier Bardem, Nicole Kidman	United States	Musical fantasy comedy
Deadpool & Wolverine	Shawn Levy	Ryan Reynolds, Hugh Jackman	United States	Action Comedy
Designation of Origin	Tomas Alzamora	Luisa Barrientos, Roberto Betancourt, Exequías Inostroza, Alexis Marín	Chile	Mockumentary
Despicable Me 4	Chris Renaud, Patrick Delage	Steve Carell, Kirsten Wiig, Miranda Cosgrove, Steve Coogan, Pierre Coffin, Will Ferrell, Sofía Vergara, Joey King	United States	Animated Action Comedy
The Fabulous Four	Jocelyn Moorhouse	Susan Sarandon, Bette Midler, Megan Mullally, Sheryl Lee Ralph, Bruce Greenwood, Timothy V. Murphy, Michael Bolton	United States	
Fly Me to the Moon	Greg Berlanti	Scarlett Johansson, Channing Tatum, Nick Dillenburg, Anna Garcia, Jim Rash, Noah Robbins, Colin Woodell, Christian Zuber, Donald Elise Watkins, Ray Romano, Woody Harrelson	United States	Romantic-dramady
The Garfield Movie	Mark Dindal	Chris Pratt, Samuel L. Jackson, Ving Rhames, Nicholas Hoult, Hannah Waddingham, Cecily Strong	United States	Animated Comedy
Ghostbusters: Frozen Empire	Gil Kenan	Finn Wolfhard, Mckenna Grace, Carrie Coon, Paul Rudd, Ernie Hudson, Dan Aykroyd, Bill Murray	United States	Horror Comedy
Goodrich	Hallie Meyers-Shyer	Michael Keaton, Mila Kunis	United States	Comedy-drama
Harold and the Purple Crayon	Carlos Saldanha	Zachary Levi, Lil Rel Howery, Zooey Deschanel, Ravi Patel, Camille Guaty, Tanya Reynolds, Pete Gardner	United States	Fantasy Comedy
The Idea of You	Michael Showalter	Anne Hathaway, Nicholas Galitzine	United States	Rom-Com
IF	John Krasinski	Ryan Reynolds, John Krasinski, Phoebe Waller-Bridge, Fiona Shaw, Steve Carell, Alan Kim, Cailey Fleming, Louis Gossett Jr., Bobby Moynihan	United States	Fantasy Comedy
Jackpot!	Paul Feig	Awkwafina, John Cena, Simu Liu	United States	Action Comedy
John Vardar vs the Galaxy	Goce Cvetanovski	Žarko Dimoski, Damjan Cvetanovski, Emilija Micevska, Filip Trajković, Toni Denkovski, Atanas Atanasovski, Sladjana Vujošević, Martin Gjorgoski, Elena Tarčugovska, Bojana Toskovska	North Macedonia, Croatia, Hungary, Bulgaria	Animated space opera adventure comedy
Kung Fu Panda 4	Mike Mitchell, Stephanie Ma Stine	Jack Black, Awkwafina, Bryan Cranston, James Hong, Ian McShane, Ke Huy Quan, Dustin Hoffman, Viola Davis	United States	Animated martial arts Comedy
Lisa Frankenstein	Zelda Williams	Kathryn Newton, Cole Sprouse, Liza Soberano, Henry Eikenberry, Joe Chrest, Carla Gugino	United States	Horror Comedy
Malas costumbres	Pablo Mantilla	Rodrigo Pardow, Mariana Loyola, Rodrigo Lisboa, Mayte Rodríguez, Joseff Messmer, Jaime Azócar, Sebastián Arrigorriaga, Jaime McManus	Chile	
Mean Girls	Samantha Jayne, Arturo Perez Jr.	Angourie Rice, Reneé Rapp, Auliʻi Cravalho	United States	
Friendship	Andrew DeYoung	Tim Robinson, Paul Rudd, Kate Mara, Jack Dylan Grazer, Josh Segarra, Billy Bryk	United States	
Not Another Church Movie	Johnny Mack	Kevin Daniels, Jamie Foxx, Vivica A. Fox, Lamorne Morris, Tisha Campbell, Jasmine Guy, Lydia Styslinger, James Michael Cummings, Kyla Pratt	United States	Parody Movie
Now There's 3 of Us? Sí, Mi Amor.	Pedro Flores Maldonado	Yiddá Eslava, Julián Zucchi, Andrés Salas, Magdyel Ugaz, Pietro Sibille	Peru	Romantic comedy
Once Upon a Time in Panama	Elmis Castillo	Elmis Castillo, Luis Gotti, Hermes Mendoza, Marcell Chávez, Robert De Luca, Diego De Obaldía, Mariano Abdel Gonzalez, Marelissa Him, Edward José, Domil Leira, Alex Mariscal, Gabriel Pérez Matteo, Ivan Peña, RoChia, Diego Ruzzarin, Abdiel Tapia, Carlos Tibbet, Marcelo Villareal, Aaron Zebede	Panama	
Quadrilateral	Daniel Rodríguez Risco	Lizet Chávez, Amil Mikati, Gonzalo Molina, Valentina Saba, Fausto Molina, Gianfranco Brero	Peru	Black comedy-drama thriller
Red One	Jake Kasdan	Dwayne Johnson, Chris Evans	United States	Action-adventure holiday Comedy
Reunion	Chris Nelson	Lil Rel Howery, Billy Magnussen, Jillian Bell, Jamie Chung, Michael Hitchcock, Nina Dobrev, Chace Crawford	United States	
Role Play	Thomas Vincent	Kaley Cuoco, David Oyelowo, Bill Nighy, Connie Nielsen	United States, France, Germany	Action Comedy
Ricky Stanicky	Peter Farrelly	Zac Efron, John Cena, Jermaine Fowler, Andrew Santino	United States	
Sincerely Saul	Ian Tripp	Ryan Schafer, Mickey Faerch, Augie Duke, Karl Backus, Brendan Cahalan, Amber Grayson, Paul Fisher III, Randy Davison, Luis Martinez, Beth Gallagher, T. K. Richardson	United States	Horror comedy
Space Cadet	Liz W. Garcia	Emma Roberts, Tom Hopper, Poppy Liu, Gabrielle Union, Kuhoo Verma, Desi Lydic, Sebastián Yatra, Sam Robards, Dave Foley, Yasha Jackson	United States	
Sonic the Hedgehog 3	Jeff Fowler	Ben Schwartz	United States	Hybrid animation Action-adventure Comedy
South Park: The End of Obesity	Trey Parker	Trey Parker	United States	Animated comedy
That Christmas	Simon Otto	Brian Cox, Fiona Shaw, Jodie Whittaker and Bill Nighy (cast leaders)	United Kingdom	CGI-animated Christmas fantasy comedy-drama
The True Story Of People In The Dragon	Pablo Greene	Catalina Saavedra, José Antonio Raffo, Abel Zicavo, Jose Nast, Mario Ocampo, Anita Reeves, Camilo Zicavo, Juan Anania, Felipe Rojas, Claudio Arredondo, Colomba Feite, Francisco Pérez-Bannen, Dani Pino	Chile	Mockumentary
Unfrosted	Jerry Seinfeld	Jerry Seinfeld, Melissa McCarthy, Jim Gaffigan, Hugh Grant, Amy Schumer, Cedric the Entertainer, Max Greenfield, Peter Dinklage, Christian Slater, Bill Burr, Dan Levy, James Marsden, Jack McBrayer	United States	
Viejas amigas	Fernando Villarán	Ana Cecilia Natteri, Haydee Cáceres, Milena Alva, Patricia Frayssinet, Brigitte Jouannet, Jely Reátegui, Eduardo Camino, Gianfranco Berro, Aysha Gómez	Peru	
We Live in Time	John Crowley	Andrew Garfield, Florence Pugh	United Kingdom	Romantic dramedy
Welcome to Paradise	Ani Alva Helfer	Tatiana Calmell, Andrés Salas, Vicente Santos, Franco Cabrera, Patricia Barreto, Yisney Lagrange, Katia Condos, Bruno Odar	Peru, Dominican Republic	Romantic comedy
When Santa Was a Communist	Emir Kapetanovic	Mirvad Kurić, Zana Marjanović, Miraj Grbić, Mirza Tanović, Kristin Winters, Goran Kostic, Alek Kapetanovic Marjanovic, Mara Auriel, Vanessa Glodjo, Sasa Orucevic, Zijo Bajric, Miro Barnjak, Ajla Beganovic, Semir Beganovic	Bosnia and Herzegovina, Serbia, Croatia	Black comedy
Wicked	Jon M. Chu	Ariana Grande, Cynthia Erivo, Jonathan Bailey	United States	Fantasy Musical Comedy
The Wild Years	Andrés Nazarala	Daniel Antivilo, Alejandro Goic, José Soza, Nathalia Galgani, Daniel Muñoz	Chile	Comedy-drama
Woody Woodpecker Goes to Camp	Jon Rosenbaum	Eric Bauza, Kevin Michael Richardson, Tom Kenny, Chloe De Los Santos, Mary-Louise Parker, Josh Lawson, Esther Son, Evan Stanhope, George Holahan-Cantwell, Kershawn Theodore, CC Dewar, Ras-Samuel Weld A'abzgi	United States	

== 2025 ==
Title	Director	Cast	Country	Subgenre/notes
Alfa and Bravo	Aaron Otoya	Aaron Otoya, Johnny “Cholo Soy” Zare, Mateo Garrido Lecca, Brenda Matos, Santiago Suárez, Daniela Segura, 'Pantera' Zegarra, Emilram Cossio, Sibenito Osorio	Peru	Action comedy
Anaconda	Tom Gormican	Jack Black, Paul Rudd, Steve Zahn, Thandiwe Newton, Daniela Melchior, Selton Mello	United States	Action horror comedy
Back in Action	Seth Gordon	Jamie Foxx, Cameron Diaz	United States	Action comedy
The Bad Guys 2	Pierre Perifel	Sam Rockwell, Marc Maron, Craig Robinson, Anthony Ramos, Awkwafina, Zazie Beetz, Richard Ayoade, Alex Borstein, Lilly Singh	United States	Animated heist comedy
Bridget Jones: Mad About the Boy	Michael Morris	Renée Zellweger, Hugh Grant, Emma Thompson, Chiwetel Ejiofor, Leo Woodall, Jim Broadbent, Gemma Jones, Isla Fisher, Josette Simon, Nico Parker, Leila Farzad	United Kingdom, United States	Rom-Com
Lilo & Stitch	Dean Fleischer Camp	Sydney Elizebeth Agudong, Billy Magnussen, Hannah Waddingham, Chris Sanders, Courtney B. Vance, Zach Galifianakis, Maia Kealoha	United States	Live-action animated science fiction comedy
Ciao Ciao	Keith Albert Tedesco	Antonella Axisa, Chris Dingli, Mikhail Basmadjian, Simone Spiteri, Kevin Naudi, Ruth Borg, Ryan Debattista, Katrina Lupi, Matthew Sant Sultana	Malta	Satirical comedy-drama
Plankton: The Movie	Dave Needham	Mr. Lawrence, Jill Talley, Tom Kenny, Bill Fagerbakke, Clancy Brown, Rodger Bumpass, Carolyn Lawrence, Lori Alan, Mary Jo Catlett	United States	Animated musical comedy
Dog Man	Peter Hastings	Pete Davidson, Lil Rel Howery, Isla Fisher, Ricky Gervais	United States	Animated superhero comedy
Dogs	Gerardo Minutti	Néstor Guzzini, Marcelo Subiotto, María Elena Pérez, Catalina Arrillaga, Noelia Campo, Roberto Suárez	Uruguay, Argentina	Black comedy
Eddington	Ari Aster	Joaquin Phoenix, Pedro Pascal, Emma Stone, Luke Grimes, Austin Butler, Deirdre O'Connell, Micheal Ward, Clifton Collins Jr.	United States	Contemporary western comedy
El Correcaminos	Barney Elliott	Emanuel Soriano, Oscar Meza, Ximena Palomino, Daniela Olaya, Emilram Cossío, Armando Machuca, Daniel Menacho, Elsa Olivero, Carlos Mesta, Víctor Prada, Junior Silva, Víctor Acurio	Peru	Action comedy
Oh. What. Fun.	Michael Showalter	Michael Showalter, Jordana Mollick, Kate Churchill, Berry Welsh, Jane Rosenthal	United States	Christmas comedy
Fixed	Genndy Tartakovsky		United States	Animated comedy
A Minecraft Movie	Jared Hess	Jason Momoa, Jack Black, Emma Myers, Danielle Brooks, Sebastian Hansen, Jennifer Coolidge	United States, Sweden	Fantasy adventure comedy
Freakier Friday	Nisha Ganatra	Jamie Lee Curtis, Lindsay Lohan, Mark Harmon, Chad Michael Murray, Christina Vidal, Haley Hudson, Lucille Soong, Stephen Tobolowsky, Rosalind Chao, Julia Butters, Manny Jacinto, Maitreyi Ramakrishnan, Sophia Hammons	United States	Fantasy comedy
Happy Gilmore 2	Kyle Newacheck	Adam Sandler, Christopher McDonald, Julie Bowen	United States	
Heads of State	Ilya Naishuller	Idris Elba, John Cena	United States	
If I Had Legs I'd Kick You	Mary Bronstein	Rose Byrne, Conan O'Brien	United States	Comedy-drama
Kangaroo	Kate Woods	Ryan Corr, Lily Whiteley, Deborah Mailman, Rachel House, Rarriwuy Hick, Rick Donald, Brooke Satchwell	Australia	Family comedy
Kinda Pregnant	Tyler Spindel	Amy Schumer, Jillian Bell, Brianne Howey, Will Forte	United States	
The Naked Gun	Akiva Schaffer	Liam Neeson, Pamela Anderson, Paul Walter Hauser, Kevin Durand, Danny Huston, Liza Koshy, Cody Rhodes, CCH Pounder, Busta Rhymes	United States	Crime comedy
Nonnas	Stephen Chbosky	Vince Vaughn, Susan Sarandon, Lorraine Bracco, Talia Shire, Brenda Vaccaro, Linda Cardellini, Drea de Matteo, Joe Manganiello, Michael Rispoli, Campbell Scott	United States	Comedy-Drama
Novocaine	Dan Berk and Robert Olsen	Jack Quaid, Amber Midthunder, Ray Nicholson, Betty Gabriel, Matt Walsh, Jacob Batalon	United States	Action comedy
One of Them Days	Lawrence Lamont	Keke Palmer, SZA, Katt Williams	United States	
The Family Plan 2	Simon Cellan Jones	Mark Wahlberg, Michelle Monaghan, Zoe Colletti, Van Crosby, Sidse Babett Knudsen, Kit Harington	United States	Action comedy
One More Shot	Nicholas Clifford	Emily Browning, Aisha Dee, Sean Keenan, Pallavi Sharda, Ashley Zukerman	United States	
Roofman	Derek Cianfrance	Channing Tatum, Kirsten Dunst, LaKeith Stanfield, Juno Temple, Peter Dinklage	United States	Crime comedy-drama
Sanatorium	Gar O'Rourke		Ireland, Ukraine, France	Documentary comedy
Diary of a Wimpy Kid: The Last Straw	Matt Danner	Aaron D. Harris, Chris Diamantopoulos, William Stanford Davis, Jude Zarzaur	United States, Canada	Animated film
Smurfs	Chris Miller	Rihanna, Nick Offerman, Natasha Lyonne, JP Karliak, Dan Levy, Amy Sedaris, Nick Kroll, James Corden, Octavia Spencer, Hannah Waddingham, Sandra Oh, Alex Winter, Billie Lourd, Xolo Maridueña, Kurt Russell, John Goodman	United States	Animated comedy
The Twits	Phil Johnston	Natalie Portman, Emilia Clarke, Margo Martindale, Johnny Vegas	United States	Animated comedy
The Wedding Banquet	Andrew Ahn	Lily Gladstone, Bowen Yang, Kelly Marie Tran, Yuh-jung Youn, Joan Chen	United States	Rom-Com
Wake Up Dead Man	Rian Johnson	Daniel Craig, Josh O'Connor, Glenn Close, Josh Brolin, Mila Kunis, Jeremy Renner, Kerry Washington, Andrew Scott, Cailee Spaeny, Daryl McCormack, Thomas Haden Church	United States	Mystery crime comedy
Wicked: For Good	Jon M. Chu	Ariana Grande, Cynthia Erivo, Jonathan Bailey	United States	Fantasy musical comedy
You're Cordially Invited	Nicholas Stoller	Will Ferrell, Reese Witherspoon, Geraldine Viswanathan, Meredith Hagner, Jimmy Tatro	United States	
The SpongeBob Movie: Search for SquarePants	Derek Drymon	Tom Kenny, Clancy Brown, Rodger Bumpass, Bill Fagerbakke, Carolyn Lawrence, Mr. Lawrence, George Lopez, Isis "Ice Spice" Gaston, Arturo Castro, Sherry Cola, Regina Hall, Mark Hamill	United States	Animated adventure comedy
Zootopia 2	Jared Bush, Byron Howard	Ginnifer Goodwin, Jason Bateman, Ke Huy Quan, Fortune Feimster, Andy Samberg, David Strathairn, Shakira, Idris Elba, Patrick Warburton, Quinta Brunson, Danny Trejo, Alan Tudyk, Nate Torrence, Don Lake, Bonnie Hunt, Jenny Slate	United States	Animated film

== 2026 ==
Title	Director	Cast	Country	Subgenre/notes
Ali G: Who Iz I?	Sacha Baron Cohen	Sacha Baron Cohen, Morgana Robinson	United States	
Attack of the Killer Tomatoes: Organic Intelligence	David Ferino	David Koechner, John Astin, Dan Bakkedahl, Daniel Roebuck, Vernee Watson, Eric Roberts, Noor Razooky	United States	Horror comedy
Avatar Aang: The Last Airbender	Lauren Montgomery	Eric Nam, Dave Bautista, Jessica Matten, Román Zaragoza, Dionne Quan, Taika Waititi, Geraldine Viswanathan, Ronny Chieng, Ken Jeong, Dee Bradley Baker, Steven Yeun, Freida Pinto, Ke Huy Quan	United States	Animated fantasy action comedy
Balls Up	Peter Farrelly	Mark Wahlberg, Paul Walter Hauser, Molly Shannon, Benjamin Bratt, Daniela Melchior, Eric André, Sacha Baron Cohen	United States	Action comedy
Coyote vs. Acme	Dave Green	Will Forte, John Cena, Lana Condor, P. J. Byrne, Tone Bell, Martha Kelly, Eric Bauza	United States	Hybrid animation comedy
Digger	Alejandro G. Iñárritu	Tom Cruise, Jesse Plemons, Sandra Hüller, Riz Ahmed, Sophie Wilde, Emma D'Arcy, Robert John Burke, Burn Gorman, Michael Stuhlbarg, John Goodman	United States, United Kingdom, Mexico	Satirical black comedy
Focker-in-Law	John Hamburg	Robert De Niro, Ben Stiller, Owen Wilson, Blythe Danner, Teri Polo, Ariana Grande	United States	
Forgotten Island	Joel Crawford	H.E.R., Liza Soberano, Dave Franco, Jenny Slate, Manny Jacinto, Dolly de Leon, Jo Koy, Ronny Chieng, Lea Salonga	United States	Animated adventure comedy
Gail Daughtry and the Celebrity Sex Pass	David Wain	Zoey Deutch, John Slattery, Ken Marino, Miles Gutierrez-Riley, Ben Wang, Sabrina Impacciatore, Jon Hamm	United States	
Goat	Tyree Dillihay	Caleb McLaughlin, Gabrielle Union, Aaron Pierre, Nicola Coughlan, David Harbour, Nick Kroll, Jenifer Lewis, Patton Oswalt, Jelly Roll, Jennifer Hudson, Sherry Cola, Eduardo Franco, Andrew Santino, Bobby Lee, Stephen Curry, Ayesha Curry	United States	Animated sports comedy
Hexed	Fawn Veerasunthorn, Jason Hand	Hailee Steinfeld, Rashida Jones, Tracey Ullman, Stephen Fry	United States	Animated coming-of-age fantasy comedy
Hoppers	Daniel Chong	Piper Curda, Bobby Moynihan, Jon Hamm, Kathy Najimy, Dave Franco	United States	Animated adventure comedy
How to Rob a Bank	David Leitch	Nicholas Hoult, Anna Sawai, Pete Davidson, Zoë Kravitz, Rhenzy Feliz, John C. Reilly, Christian Slater	United States	Action heist comedy
Idiots	Macon Blair	Dave Franco, O'Shea Jackson Jr., Mason Thames, Kiernan Shipka, Nicholas Braun, Peter Dinklage	United States	
If I Were You 3	Anita Barbosa	Gloria Pires, Tony Ramos, Cleo Pires, Rafael Infante	Brazil	
Jackass: Best and Last	Jeff Tremaine	Johnny Knoxville, Steve-O, Chris Pontius, Wee Man, Preston Lacy, Dave England, Danger Ehren, Poopies, Zach Holmes, Jasper Dolphin, Rachel Wolfson, Eric Manaka	United States	Slapstick comedy
Jumanji: Open World	Jake Kasdan	Dwayne Johnson, Jack Black, Kevin Hart, Karen Gillan, Nick Jonas, Awkwafina, Alex Wolff, Morgan Turner, Ser'Darius Blain, Madison Iseman, Burn Gorman, Bebe Neuwirth, Lamorne Morris, Nasim Pedrad, Danny DeVito	United States	Adventure comedy
Matchbox: The Movie	Sam Hargrave	John Cena, Jessica Biel, Sam Richardson, Teyonah Parris, Arturo Castro, Randeep Hooda, Danai Gurira, Corey Stoll, Golshifteh Farahani, Bill Camp	United States	Action adventure comedy
Mayday	Jonathan Goldstein, John Francis Daley	Ryan Reynolds, Kenneth Branagh, Maria Bakalova, Marcin Dorociński, David Morse	United States	Action comedy
Mike & Nick & Nick & Alice	BenDavid Grabinski	Vince Vaughn, James Marsden, Eiza González, Jimmy Tatro, Keith David, Emily Hampshire, Arturo Castro, Lewis Tan, Ben Schwartz	United States	Science Fiction action comedy
Minions & Monsters	Pierre Coffin	Pierre Coffin, Trey Parker, Jesse Eisenberg, Zoey Deutch, Allison Janney, Bobby Moynihan, Phil LaMarr, Christoph Waltz, Jeff Bridges	United States	Animated film
My Amazing Grandma	Ana Vázquez	Elena Irureta, Toni Acosta, Carla Pastor, Darío Moncloa, Adrián Gámiz, Sofía González, El Pirata	Spain	
My Best Enemy	Saskia Bernaola	Nataniel Sánchez, Carlos Casella, Kukuli Morante, Fiorella Luna, Omar García, Carla Arriola, Guillermo Castañeda, Mateo Garrido Lecca, Karina Rivera, Ricardo Bonilla, Fernando Bakovic, Patricia Portocarrero	Peru	
Office Romance	Ol Parker	Brett Goldstein, Jennifer Lopez	United States	Romantic comedy
One Night Only	Will Gluck	Monica Barbaro, Callum Turner	United States	Romantic comedy
Outcome	Jonah Hill	Keanu Reeves, Jonah Hill, Cameron Diaz, Matt Bomer, Cary Christopher, David Spade, Laverne Cox	United States	
Paw Patrol: The Dino Movie	Cal Brunker	Carter Young, Mckenna Grace, Terry Crews, Meredith MacNeill, Ron Pardo, Jennifer Hudson, Hayden Chemberlen, Fortune Feimster, Jameela Jamil, Rain Janjua, Bill Nye, Paris Hilton, Lucien Duncan-Reid, William Desrosiers, Nylan Parthipan, Snoop Dogg, Henry Bolan	United States, Canada	Action-adventure comedy
People We Meet on Vacation	Brett Haley	Emily Bader, Tom Blyth	United States	Romantic comedy
Poetic License	Maude Apatow	Andrew Barth Feldman, Cooper Hoffman, Leslie Mann, Nico Parker, Maisy Stella, Method Man, Martha Kelly, Jake Bongiovi	United States	
Ready or Not 2: Here I Come	Matt Bettinelli-Olpin, Tyler Gillett	Samara Weaving, Kathryn Newton, Sarah Michelle Gellar, Shawn Hatosy, David Cronenberg, Elijah Wood	United States	Horror comedy
Savage House	Peter Glanz	Claire Foy, Richard E. Grant, Bel Powley	United Kingdom	Period black comedy
Scary Movie	Michael Tiddes	Marlon Wayans, Shawn Wayans, Anna Faris, Regina Hall, Damon Wayans Jr., Gregg Wayans, Kim Wayans, Benny Zielke, Cameron Scott Roberts, Cheri Oteri, Chris Elliott, Dave Sheridan, Heidi Gardner, Lochlyn Munro, Olivia Rose Keegan, Ruby Snowber, Savannah Lee Nassif, Sydney Park	United States	Parody film
Solo Mio	Chuck Kinnane, Dan Kinnane	Kevin James	United States	Comedy-Drama
Stop! That! Train!	Adam Shankman	Ginger Minj, Jujubee, RuPaul Charles	United States	Action disaster comedy
Street Fighter	Kitao Sakurai	Noah Centineo, Andrew Koji, Callina Liang, Joe "Roman Reigns" Anoa'i, David Dastmalchian, Cody Rhodes, Andrew Schulz, Eric André, Vidyut Jammwal, Curtis "50 Cent" Jackson, Jason Momoa	United States	Action comedy
Super Troopers 3	Jay Chandrasekhar	Jay Chandrasekhar, Kevin Heffernan, Steve Lemme, Paul Soter, Erik Stolhanske, Brian Cox, Marisa Coughlan, Hannah Simone, Iqbal Theba	United States	
Swapped	Nathan Greno	Michael B. Jordan, Juno Temple, Tracy Morgan, Cedric the Entertainer, Justina Machado	United States	Animated film
The Angry Birds Movie 3	John Rice	Jason Sudeikis, Josh Gad, Rachel Bloom, Danny McBride, Emma Myers, Keke Palmer, Lily James, Tim Robinson	United States	Animated film
The Breadwinner	Eric Appel	Nate Bargatze, Mandy Moore, Will Forte	United States	
The Cat in the Hat	Erica Rivinoja, Alessandro Carloni	Bill Hader, Quinta Brunson, Bowen Yang, Xochitl Gomez, Matt Berry, Paula Pell	United States	Animated family fantasy, comedy
The Devil Wears Prada 2	David Frankel	Meryl Streep, Anne Hathaway, Emily Blunt	United States	Comedy-drama
The Gallerist	Cathy Yan	Natalie Portman, Jenna Ortega, Sterling K. Brown, Zach Galifianakis, Da'Vine Joy Randolph, Catherine Zeta-Jones	United States	Dark comedy, crime thriller
The Invite	Olivia Wilde	Olivia Wilde, Seth Rogen, Penélope Cruz, Edward Norton	United States	
The Man with the Bag	Adam Shankman	Alan Ritchson, Arnold Schwarzenegger, Awkwafina, Liza Koshy, Kyle Mooney, Adrian Martinez, Jane Krakowski, Ken Jeong	United States	Christmas action comedy
The Sheep Detectives	Kyle Balda	Hugh Jackman, Emma Thompson, Nicholas Braun, Nicholas Galitzine, Molly Gordon, Hong Chau, Tosin Cole, Kobna Holdbrook-Smith, Conleth Hill, Mandeep Dhillon	United States, United Kingdom	Action mystery comedy
The Super Mario Galaxy Movie	Aaron Horvath, Michael Jelenic	Chris Pratt, Anya Taylor-Joy, Charlie Day, Jack Black, Keegan-Michael Key, Benny Safdie, Donald Glover, Issa Rae, Luis Guzmán, Kevin Michael Richardson, Brie Larson	United States, Japan	Animated adventure comedy
They Will Kill You	Kirill Sokolov	Zazie Beetz, Myha'la, Paterson Joseph, Tom Felton, Heather Graham, Patricia Arquette	United States, South Africa, Canada	Action horror comedy
Toy Story 5	Andrew Stanton	Tom Hanks, Tim Allen, Joan Cusack, Greta Lee, Conan O'Brien, Tony Hale, Craig Robinson, Shelby Rabara, Scarlett Spears, Mykal-Michelle Harris, Matty Matheson, John Ratzenberger, Wallace Shawn, Blake Clark, Jeff Bergman, Anna Vocino, Annie Potts, Bonnie Hunt, Melissa Villaseñor, John Hopkins, Kristen Schaal, Ernie Hudson, Keanu Reeves	United States	Animated comedy
Violent Night 2	Tommy Wirkola	David Harbour, Daniela Melchior, Kristen Bell, Jared Harris, Joe Pantoliano, Maxwell Friedman, Andrew Bachelor	United States	Christmas action comedy
Voicemails for Isabelle	Leah McKendrick	Zoey Deutch, Nick Robinson, Nick Offerman, Lukas Gage, Harry Shum Jr., Ciara Bravo, Megan Danso, Toby Sandeman, Leah McKendrick, Spencer Lord, Gil Bellows	United States	
Welcome to the Jungle	Ahmed Khan	Akshay Kumar, Suniel Shetty, Jackie Shroff, Raveena Tandon, Disha Patani, Jacqueline Fernandez, Arshad Warsi, Paresh Rawal, Lara Dutta, Yashpal Sharma, Daler Mehndi, Mika Singh, Johnny Lever, Aftab Shivdasani, Rajpal Yadav, Sanjay Dutt, Tushar Kapoor, Krushna Abhishek, Kiku Sharda, Shreyas Talpade	India	Action comedy
Wild Horse Nine	Martin McDonagh	John Malkovich, Sam Rockwell, Steve Buscemi, Tom Waits, Parker Posey	United Kingdom	Black comedy
You, Me & Tuscany	Kat Coiro	Halle Bailey, Regé-Jean Page, Marco Calvani, Aziza Scott	United States	Romantic comedy

== 2027 ==
Title	Director	Cast	Country	Subgenre/notes
4 Kids Walk Into a Bank	Frankie Shaw	Liam Neeson, Talia Ryder, Whitney Peak, Jack Dylan Grazer, Spike Fearn, Teresa Palmer, Jim Sturgess	United States	Heist comedy
Air Bud Returns	Robert Vince	Aydin Artis, Tracy Ifeachor, Edwin Lee Gibson, Tyler Labine, Erik Gow, Maxim Swinton	United States	Sports Comedy-Drama
Animal Friends	Peter Atencio	Ryan Reynolds, Jason Momoa, Vince Vaughn, Aubrey Plaza, Addison Rae, Dan Levy, Lil Rel Howery, Joaquim de Almeida	United States	Hybrid animation action road comedy
Bad Fairies	Megan Nicole Dong	Cynitha Erivo, Ncuti Gatwa, James Acaster, Dee Bradley Baker, Serrana Su-Ling Bliss	United Kingdom, United States	Animated musical fantasy comedy
Beach Read	Yulin Kuang	Phoebe Dynevor, Patrick Schwarzenegger, Andie MacDowell, Kevin Bacon, Kristin Davis, Tig Notaro	United States	Romantic comedy
The Bluey Movie	Joe Brumm, Richard Jeffery	David McCormack, Melanie Zanetti	United States, United Kingdom, Australia	Animated comedy
Buds	TBA		United States	Animated comedy
CoComelon: The Movie	Kat Good	SZA, Connor Esterson, Ike Barinholtz, Nicholas Hoult, Rhys Darby, Cristo Fernández, Josh Johnson, Ego Nwodim, Matt Friend, Sarah Sherman	United States	Animated musical adventure comedy
Drag	Raviv Ullman, Greg Yagolnitzer	Lizzy Caplan, Lucy DeVito, John Stamos, Christine Ko	United States	Thriller comedy
Gatto	Enrico Casarosa	Mark Ruffalo, Laurence Fishburne, Enrico Casarosa	United States	Animated comedy
Ice Age: Boiling Point	John C. Donkin	Ray Romano, John Leguizamo, Denis Leary, Simon Pegg, Queen Latifah	United States	Animated adventure comedy
Jason Statham Stole My Bike	David Leitch	Jason Statham, Hannah Waddingham, Eddie Peng, Daniel Ings	United States	Action comedy
Margie Claus	Kirk DeMicco	Melissa McCarthy	United States	Animated family fantasy, Christmas comedy
A Minecraft Movie Squared	Jared Hess	Jason Momoa, Jack Black, Kirsten Dunst, Danielle Brooks, Matt Berry, Jennifer Coolidge	United States, Sweden	Adventure comedy
Not Alone	Eric Guillon, Claire Dodgson, Jonathan del Val	Timothée Chalamet, Selena Gomez, Brett Goldstein, Rob Brydon, Jamie Demetriou, Diane Morgan, Allison Janney, Lamorne Morris	United States	Animated science fiction romantic comedy
Paris Paramount	Nancy Meyers	Penélope Cruz, Kieran Culkin, Erin Doherty, Jude Law, Owen Wilson, Tony Hale, Beverly D'Angelo	United States	Romantic comedy
Shrek 5	Conrad Vernon, Walt Dohrn	Mike Myers, Eddie Murphy, Cameron Diaz, Zendaya, Skyler Gisondo, Marcello Hernández	United States	Animated fantasy comedy
Sonic the Hedgehog 4	Jeff Fowler	Jim Carrey, Ben Schwartz, Kristen Bell, Idris Elba, Keanu Reeves, James Marsden, Tika Sumpter, Ben Kingsley, Matt Berry, Colleen O'Shaughnessey, Lee Majdoub, Nick Offerman, Richard Ayoade	United States	Hybrid animation Action-adventure Comedy
Spaceballs: The New One	Josh Greenbaum	Mel Brooks, Rick Moranis, Bill Pullman, Daphne Zuniga, George Wyner, Josh Gad, Keke Palmer, Lewis Pullman, Anthony Carrigan	United States	Parody film
Spider-Man: Beyond the Spider-Verse	Bob Persichetti, Justin K. Thompson	Shameik Moore, Hailee Steinfeld, Brian Tyree Henry, Lauren Vélez, Jake Johnson, Jason Schwartzman, Karan Soni, John Mulaney, Kimiko Glenn, Daniel Kaluuya, Mahershala Ali, Nicolas Cage, Oscar Isaac	United States	Animated superhero comedy
The Catch	Dave McCary	Emma Stone, Chris Pine, Ashley Padilla, Druski, Tim Robbins, Sissy Spacek	United States	Romantic comedy
The Comeback King	Judd Apatow	Glen Powell, Cristin Milioti, Madelyn Cline, Stavros Halkias, Jin Hao Li	United States	
The Haunting of Hotel Transylvania	Jennifer Kluska, Alan Hawkins		United States	Animated monster horror comedy
The Saviors	Kevin Hamedani	Adam Scott, Danielle Deadwyler, Ron Perlman, Colleen Camp, Greg Kinnear	United States	Thriller dark comedy
The New Simpsons Movie	TBA		United States	Animated comedy
Wife & Dog	Guy Ritchie	Benedict Cumberbatch, Rosamund Pike, Anthony Hopkins, Cosmo Jarvis, James Norton, Paddy Considine, Pip Torrens	United Kingdom	Black comedy
Thing One and Thing Two	TBA		United States	Animated fantasy, family comedy
Untitled Ocean's Prequel	Bradley Cooper	Bradley Cooper, Margot Robbie	United States	Heist comedy
Untitled Teenage Mutant Ninja Turtles: Mutant Mayhem sequel	Jeff Rowe	Micah Abbey, Shamon Brown Jr., Nicolas Cantu, Brady Noon	United States	Animated superhero comedy
Wishful Thinking	Graham Parkes	Maya Hawke, Lewis Pullman, Randall Park, Jake Shane, Amita Rao	United States	Romantic fantasy comedy

== 2028 ==
Title	Director	Cast	Country	Subgenre/notes
Donkey	Charlie Bean	Eddie Murphy	United States	Animated fantasy comedy
Freddy the 13th	Dan Trachtenberg		United States	Animated comedy horror
Ghost Market	Trevor Jimenez, Jesse Andrews		United States	Animated comedy horror
Incredibles 3	Peter Sohn	Sarah Vowell, Holly Hunter, Craig T. Nelson, Samuel L. Jackson	United States	Animated comedy, superhero
Lilo & Stitch 2	Chris Sanders		United States	Live-action animated science fiction comedy
Mission: Granny	Toni Weiss		United Kingdom	Animated action comedy
Murder, She Wrote	Jason Moore	Jamie Lee Curtis	United States	Crime comedy, mystery
Oh, the Places You'll Go!	Jon M. Chu, Jill Culton	Ariana Grande, Josh Gad	United States	Animated family fantasy, comedy, musical
Tangled	Michael Gracey	Teagan Croft, Milo Manheim, Kathryn Hahn, Diego Luna, Caitríona Balfe	United States	Musical fantasy comedy
