= Doblemente embarazada =

Doblemente embarazada may refer to:

- Doblemente embarazada (2019 film), a Mexican comedy film
- Doblemente embarazada (2021 film), a Peruvian comedy film, a remake of the above
