= Mañana te cuento 2 =

- Theatrical release poster
- Directed by: Eduardo Mendoza de Echave
- Written by: Eduardo Mendoza de Echave
- Produced by: Cecilia Carrasco; Elart Coello; Aman Kumar Kapur; Varun Kumar Kapur; Gustavo Sánchez
- Starring: Melania Urbina; Bruno Ascenzo; Giovanni Ciccia; Oscar Beltrán; Vanessa Jerí; Leisy Suárez
- Cinematography: Eugenio Cañas
- Production companies: Inca Cine; Star Films; Laguna Productions
- Distributed by: Inca Cine
- Release date: February 14, 2008
- Running time: 90 minutes
- Country: Peru
- Language: Spanish
- Box office: $470,656

Mañana te cuento 2 (lit. 'Tomorrow, I tell you 2') is a 2008 Peruvian romantic comedy-drama film written and directed by Eduardo Mendoza de Echave. It is a sequel to the 2005 film Mañana te cuento. Starring Melania Urbina, Bruno Ascenzo, Giovanni Ciccia, Oscar Beltrán, Vanessa Jerí and Leisy Suárez. It premiered on February 14, 2008, in Peruvian theaters.

== Synopsis ==
It's been four years since the nightlife changed for these four friends who hadn't finished school yet. The friendship of three of them survived that intense night, now they live together and try to make this inevitable transition to adulthood less harsh and more fleeting. However, a character from the past will come to complicate things in an unexpected and dizzying way, forcing them to make decisions for which they may not feel prepared. Efraín and the fat man will go from a crazy night to one of their worst nightmares and Manuel will have a reunion with Bibiana that will definitely set the course of their lives this time.

== Cast ==
The actors participating in this film are:

- Melania Urbina as Bibiana
- Bruno Ascenzo as Manuel
- Giovanni Ciccia as Alfredo
- Oscar Beltrán as Efraín
- José Manuel Peláez as "El gordo"
- Vanesa Jeri as Lorena
- Leisy Suárez as Sandra
- Diego Lombardi as Raúl
- Magdyel Ugaz as Female Kidnapper
- Paul Ramírez as Male Kidnapper
- Américo Zúñiga as Trucha
- Nora Cafetara as Bibiana's grandmother
- Marco Zunino as Casino boy

== Reception ==
Mañana te cuento 2 got 34,000 viewers on its first day in theaters. The film drew 188,895 viewers after 5 weeks in theaters.
