= The Gospel of the Flesh =

2013 film

- Theatrical release poster
- Directed by: Eduardo Mendoza de Echave
- Written by: Eduardo Mendoza de Echave; Úrsula Vilca García
- Produced by: Gustavo Sánchez
- Starring: Giovanni Ciccia; Jimena Lindo
- Music by: Jorge Sabogal
- Production company: La Soga Producciones
- Release dates: August 2013 (Lima); 17 October 2013 (Peru)
- Running time: 110 minutes
- Country: Peru
- Language: Spanish

The Gospel of the Flesh (Spanish: El evangelio de la carne) is a 2013 Peruvian crime drama thriller film directed by Eduardo Mendoza de Echave. It was selected as the Peruvian entry for the Best Foreign Language Film at the 87th Academy Awards, but was not nominated. It premiered on 17 October 2013 in Lima and several other provinces.

== Synopsis ==
The film follows the lives of three men in Lima who follow pathways of faith and redemption. Gamarra is an undercover police officer trying to raise money to save his terminally ill wife. Felix is a former bus driver whose involvement in a fatal accident causes him to seek a religious sect. Narciso is a soccer club leader attempting to get his younger brother released from prison.

== Cast ==
- Giovanni Ciccia as Gamarra
- Ismael Contreras as Felix
- Sebastian Monteghirfo as Narciso
- Lucho Caceres as Ramirez
- Jimena Lindo as Julia
- Cindy Diaz as Nancy

== Filming ==
Approximately a quarter of the film's budget was covered by a financial award from the Peruvian government on the strength of the film's screenplay. To prepare for his role as a police officer, Giovanni Ciccia worked alongside officers from the Villa El Salvador police station, undertaking several ride-alongs including a raid on a clandestine brothel.

== Release and reception ==
The Gospel of the Flesh was selected to represent Peruvian cinema at the 87th Academy Awards, but did not receive a nomination. The film won the Audience Award at the 17th Lima Film Festival. It also was awarded Best Film, Best Director, and Best Screenplay at the 2014 Peruvian International Film Festival (New Jersey) and won the Ulysses Award for Best Latin American Film at the 2015 Quito International Film Festival.

Eduardo Mendoza, the film's director, commented that he poured the experience he gained directing films like Mañana te cuento and Bolero de noche into creating the film, stating that he considered it more intimate and personal than his earlier works.

Rodrigo Bedoya Forno, writing in El Comercio, called the film a significant leap forward in Mendoza's filmography. Jonathan Holland wrote in The Hollywood Reporter that the film was "hardly original, but at least it steals from high-class places." Alberto Vergara, in ReVista: Harvard Review of Latin America, highlighted the way that Lima itself is portrayed as the main character, exploring themes of the social fabric which comes together to help those in need.

== See also ==
- List of submissions to the 87th Academy Awards for Best Foreign Language Film
- List of Peruvian submissions for the Academy Award for Best Foreign Language Film
