= My Best Enemy =

My Best Enemy may refer to:

- My Best Enemy (2005 film), a Chilean/Argentine/Spanish film
- My Best Enemy (2006 film), an Italian film
- My Best Enemy (2011 film), an Austrian / Luxembourgian film
- My Best Enemy (2026 film), a Peruvian comedy film
