= Eduardo Mendoza de Echave =

Peruvian filmmaker

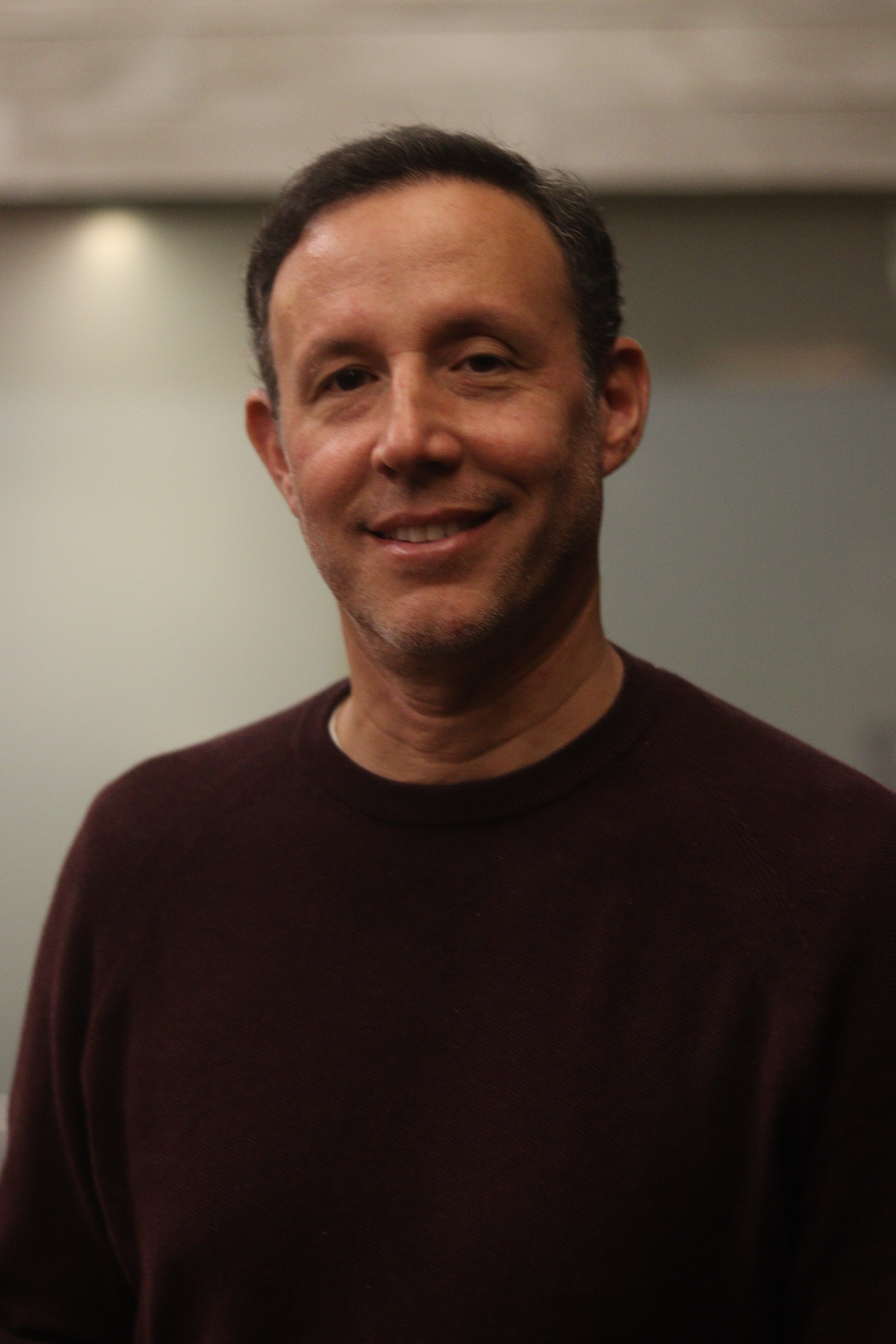
- Mendoza in 2025
- Born: 1975 (age 50–51); Lima, Peru
- Occupations: Film director Screenwriter; Film producer Television producer University teacher
- Years active: 2001–present
- Notable work: Mañana te cuento The Gospel of the Flesh; The Last Hour

Gonzalo Ladines (born 1975, Lima, Peru) is a Peruvian filmmaker and university teacher. He has written, directed and produced for film and television, including the sex comedy film Mañana te cuento (2005), and its sequel Mañana te cuento 2 (2008), the crime thriller films The Gospel of the Flesh (2013) and The Last Hour (2017), and the television series Esta sociedad (2006).

== Career ==
Mendoza was born in Lima in 1975, is a graduate of the Faculty of Sciences and Arts of Communication of the Pontifical Catholic University of Peru, and studied filmmaking at the Federal University of Paraíba.

Since 2001, he has worked as a film and television director and screenwriter. In 2005, he released his directorial debut, Mañana te cuento (I'll Tell You Tomorrow), which attracted 288,242 viewers, becoming the third highest-grossing Peruvian film at the time. A sequel, Mañana te cuento 2 (I'll Tell You Tomorrow 2), was released three years later, again a box office success, but with lower earnings.

In 2006, he directed all and wrote some of the episodes of the first season of the television series Esta sociedad; in the second season he was replaced by Aldo Salvini.

In 2008, he made his English-language directorial debut, Snuff Dogs, a low-budget thriller film that was released on DVD and in select territories over the next two years.

In 2011, he released the drama film Bolero de noche (Bolero at Night), which was nominated for the Luces Award for Best Film.

In 2013, he released his fifth film, The Gospel of the Flesh, which won the Audience Award, Titra Award and the Association of Communicators Award at the 17th Lima Film Festival, and was selected as the Peruvian entry for the Best Foreign Language Film at the 87th Academy Awards. That same year he began working as a professor at the Escuela Peruana de la Industria Cinematográfica (EPIC) and later at the University of Sciences and Arts of Latin America (UCAL) in the film career.

In early 2017, he filmed his sixth film, The Last Hour, which premiered on September of the same year, attracting 224,732 viewers and becoming a box office success. After its theatrical release, on June 15, 2018 it was released internationally on Netflix.

Im 2019, he made the documentary film Contigo Perú (With you Peru), which covers the Peruvian national football team's qualification process for the 2018 FIFA World Cup. In November of that same year, filming began on the comedy film Doblemente embarazada (Doubly pregnant), a remake of the Mexican film of the same name, which was scheduled to premiere in April 2020, but it was delayed due to the COVID-19 pandemic. It finally premiered in September 2021.

In 2022, he released his eighth fiction feature film, the political comedy La banda presidencial (The Presidential Band).

== Filmography ==
Year	Title	Director	Writer	Producer	Notes
2001	TQ-1992	Yes	Yes	No	Short film
2005	The Gold Tooth	Yes	Yes	No	Short film
2005	Mañana te cuento	Yes	Yes	No	Feature film
2006	Esta sociedad	Yes	Yes	No	Television series; 19 episodes
2008	Mañana te cuento 2	Yes	Yes	No	Feature film
2008	Snuff Dogs	Yes	No	No	Feature film
2008	The Watercolorist	No	Yes	No	Feature film
2010	Ella	No	Yes	No	Feature film
2011	Bolero de noche	Yes	No	No	Feature film
2013	The Gospel of the Flesh	Yes	Yes	No	Feature film
2014-2015	Camino al Triunfo	Yes	No	No	Television series
2015	TVEmos	Yes	No	No	Television series
2017	The Last Hour	Yes	Yes	Yes	Feature film
2019	Contigo Peru	Yes	No	No	Documentary feature film
2021	Doblemente embarazada	Yes	Yes	No	Feature film
2022	La banda presidencial	Yes	Yes	No	Feature film
2026	The Girls Garden	Yes	Yes	Yes	Feature film
