= Mañana te cuento =

- Theatrical release poster
- Directed by: Eduardo Mendoza de Echave
- Written by: Eduardo Mendoza de Echave
- Produced by: Miguel Asensio Llamas; Esther Ayarza; Nelson Castillo; Mailo Darriba; Aman Kumar Kapur; Varun Kumar Kapur; Aroom Kumar; Doménica Seminario; Gustavo Sánchez; Julian Torres; Javier Valiño; Juan Carlos Villanueva
- Starring: Melania Urbina; Milene Vásquez; Angie Jibaja; Bruno Ascenzo; Oscar Beltrán; Jason Day; José Manuel Peláez
- Cinematography: Fergan Chávez-Ferrer
- Edited by: Diego Macho Gómez
- Music by: Manuel Riveiro
- Production company: Inca Cine S.A.C.
- Distributed by: Alta Classics S.L.
- Release date: June 2, 2005
- Running time: 90 minutes
- Country: Peru
- Language: Spanish

Mañana te cuento (lit. 'Tomorrow, I tell you') is a 2005 Peruvian romantic comedy-drama film written and directed by Eduardo Mendoza de Echave in his directorial debut. Starring Melania Urbina, Milene Vásquez, Angie Jibaja, Bruno Ascenzo, Oscar Beltrán, Jason Day and José Manuel Peláez. It premiered on June 2, 2005, in Peruvian theaters.

== Synopsis ==
In search of making a sexual debut, 4 young people turn to the advertisements that abound in the newspapers and contact three prostitutes through the Internet. These are A1 girls, whose services are expensive. In the course of a whole night they will experience more than one incident.

== Cast ==
The actors participating in this film are:

- Melania Urbina as Bibiana
- Milene Vásquez as Carla
- Angie Jibaja as Gabriela
- Bruno Ascenzo as Manuel
- Oscar Beltrán as Efraín
- Jason Day as Juan Diego
- José Manuel Peláez as "El Gordo"
- Sandra Vergara as Mari Pilí
- Carolina Caro as Daniela
- Norka Ramírez as Margarita

== Reception ==
Mañana te cuento managed to attract 288,242 viewers throughout its career in theaters, becoming the third highest grossing Peruvian film at the time.

== Sequel ==
After the success of the film, a sequel called Mañana te cuento 2 (lit. 'Tomorrow, I tell you 2') was released on February 14, 2008, in Peruvian theaters.
