= Black Butterfly (2006 film) =

- The cover for the film
- Directed by: Francisco Lombardi
- Written by: Alonso Cueto (story); Giovanna Pollarolo (writer)
- Produced by: Gustavo Sánchez
- Edited by: Roberto Benavides
- Release date: November 1, 2006
- Running time: 118 minutes
- Countries: Spain; Peru
- Language: Spanish

Black Butterfly (Spanish: Mariposa negra) is a 2006 Peruvian drama film directed by Francisco Lombardi from a screenplay written by Giovanna Pollarolo, based on the novel of Alonso Cueto.

== Cast ==
- Darío Abad as Guido Pazos
- Gustavo Bueno as Osmán
- Montserrat Carulla as Pilar
- Yvonne Frayssinet as Dotty
- Lluís Homar as Mar
- Ricardo Morán as Ramón
- Liliana Trujillo as Aida
- Magdyel Ugaz as Ángela
- Melania Urbina as Gabriela

== Awards and nominations ==
=== Won ===
Málaga Spanish Film Festival

- Best Latin American Actress (Melania Urbina)

=== Nominated ===
Goya Awards

- Best Spanish Language Foreign Film (lost to XXY)

Montréal Film Festival

- Grand Prix des Amériques (lost to O Maior Amor do Mundo and Nagai sanpo)

Luces Awards

- Best Film (lost to Madeinusa)
