= Where's the Right Girl =

- Amazon Prime Video release poster
- Spanish: Busco novia
- Directed by: Daniel Vega
- Screenplay by: Renato Cisneros
- Based on: Busco novia by Renato Cisneros
- Produced by: Marcos Camacho; Jorge Constantino; Miguel Valladares; Diego Vives
- Starring: César Ritter; Magdyel Ugaz; Vadhir Derbez; Fiorella Pennano; Gustavo Bueno; Grapa Paola
- Cinematography: Roberto Maceda Kohatsu
- Edited by: Renato Constantino; Eric Williams
- Production company: Tondero Producciones
- Distributed by: Amazon Prime Video
- Release date: November 16, 2022 (Prime Video)
- Running time: 100 minutes
- Country: Peru
- Language: Spanish

Where's The Right Girl (Spanish: Busco novia, lit. 'Search Girlfriend') is a 2022 Peruvian comedy film directed by Daniel Vega and written by Renato Cisneros. Based on the blog of the same name from El Comercio written by Renato Cisneros. It stars César Ritter, Magdyel Ugaz, Vadhir Derbez, Fiorella Pennano, Gustavo Bueno and Grapa Paola.

== Synopsis ==
The film tells the story of Renzo Collazos, a thirty-something journalist who is looking for a girlfriend and who, out of obligation, must start writing a blog about his failed love life.

== Cast ==
The actors participating in this film are:

- César Ritter as Renzo Collazos
- Magdyel Ugaz as Lucía
- Fiorella Pennano as Mariana
- Vadhir Derbez as Robot
- Gustavo Bueno as Ventoso
- Grapa Paola as Dora

== Production ==
The film begins filming in mid-February 2019 with a duration of 5 weeks.

== Release ==
The film was to be released on May 7, 2020, in Peruvian theaters, but the premiere was canceled due to the closure of theaters due to the COVID-19 pandemic. Finally, the film was released internationally on November 18, 2022, on Amazon Prime Video.
