= Friends in Trouble =

Amigos en apuros
- Theatrical release poster
- Directed by: Joel Calero; Lucho Cáceres
- Written by: Joel Calero; Lucho Cáceres
- Produced by: Carol Delgado Orbezo; Christian Thorsen; Joel Calero; Lucho Cáceres
- Starring: Lucho Cáceres; Christian Thorsen
- Music by: Karin Zielinski
- Production companies: Amakeya Producciones; Waco Films
- Release date: October 18, 2018
- Running time: 100 minutes
- Country: Peru
- Language: Spanish

Friends in trouble (Spanish: Amigos en apuros) is a 2018 Peruvian comedy film written and directed by Joel Calero & Lucho Cáceres (in his directorial debut). It stars Lucho Cáceres and Christian Thorsen. It premiered on October 18, 2018 in Peruvian theaters.

== Synopsis ==
Fico is devastated by his recent divorce and Manolo, his lifelong friend, decides to move in with him. What Fico doesn't know is that Manolo is fleeing from some gangsters who are chasing him. Before they know it, they get involved in a series of crazy entanglements that will finally lead them to discover the true meaning of friendship.

== Cast ==
The actors participating in this film are:

- Lucho Cáceres as Manolo
- Christian Thorsen as Fico
- Gustavo Bueno
- Reynaldo Arenas
- Cécica Bernasconi
- Luciana Blomberg
- Aldo Miyashiro
- Milett Figueroa
- Pold Gastelo
- Magdyel Ugaz

== Production ==
Principal photography for the film began on January 5, 2018 under the title Solteros Inmaduros (Immature Singles), but was later changed to Amigos en apuros (Friends in trouble) to make it more commercial.

== Reception ==
Friends in trouble attracted 137,768 viewers, becoming the 11th highest-grossing Peruvian film of 2018.
