= Who Said Detox? =

¿Quién dijo Detox?
- Theatrical release poster
- Directed by: Rosa María Santisteban
- Written by: Rosa María Santisteban
- Starring: Luciana Blomberg; Jimena Lindo; Korina Rivadeneira; Maju Mantilla; Gachi Rivero; Andres Vilchez; Francisco Andrade; Ximena Rodriguez
- Cinematography: Fernando Cobian
- Edited by: Eric Williams
- Music by: Jorge Miranda
- Production company: Tondero Producciones
- Distributed by: Tondero Producciones
- Release date: March 10, 2022
- Running time: 91 minutes
- Country: Peru
- Language: Spanish

Who Said Detox? (Spanish: ¿Quién dijo Detox?) is a 2022 Peruvian comedy film written and directed by Rosa María Santisteban in her directorial debut. The film stars Luciana Blomberg, Jimena Lindo, Korina Rivadeneira, Maju Mantilla, Gachi Rivero, Andres Vilchez, Francisco Andrade and Ximena Rodriguez.

== Synopsis ==
Connie wants to win an account at the law firm where she works, so she will accept a bet that will lead her to expose her life on social networks.

== Cast ==
The actors participating in this film are:

- Luciana Blomberg as Connie Garcia
- Francisco Andrade as Guille
- Jose Dammert as Tito
- Maria Julia Mantilla Garcia as Tati
- Jimena Lindo as Romina Fermor
- Korina Rivadeneira as Camucha De Romaña
- Andres Vilchez as Salvador

== Release ==
The film premiered on March 10, 2022, in Peruvian theaters.
