= Lumen Beltran =

- Occupation: Actress
- Years active: 2020 - present
- Website: lumenbeltran.com/take1

Lumen Beltran is a Canadian actress and media producer. She is best known for her work in independent films, including The Monkey, Sophie's Rules, and Telus Storyhive films On Gordon Alley, Casket Case, Kong Kong's House of Kung Fu on Telus Optik TV.

Beltran is also seen as one of the titular sisters in Three Ates and a Wedding, which she also produced. Three Ates and a Wedding premiered on The Filipino Channel The Crossing anthology series after completing its festival run at the Vancouver Asian Film Festival, DisOrient Asian American Film Festival of Oregon, Los Angeles Asian Pacific Film Festival, and FilAm Creative Film Festival.

Beltran is the host and executive producer of Take 1, a talk show and podcast she is developing with business partner Emmanuel Munda, owner of D1 Productions LLC.

== Early life and career ==
Lumen Beltran was born in Manila, Philippines. She immigrated to Canada at 6 years old. By the time she was a teenager, Beltran felt she had lost her mother tongue, her traditions, and most of what made her feel Filipino. Beltran found that acting became her way back to her cultural roots.

While competing in the Miss Asia Calgary beauty pageant, Beltran was scouted and signed by a talent agent to begin auditioning for film and television roles. Shortly after, she booked her first television credit on Guilty Party and relocated to Vancouver to play the role of Amber in Sophie's Rules.

== Community involvement ==
Beltran participated in the 2026 Filipino World Series, a celebration of Filipino culture and community hosted by the Philippines Baseball Group. She took part in the second annual Celebrity Baseball Game alongside Filipino-American personalities, including Dante Basco, Ruby Rodriguez, and Roshon Fegan. Beltran is also a judge for GEMfest, the Gender Equity Media Society's film festival platform.
