= Ok, It's Fine... =

Ok, está bien...
- Film poster
- Directed by: Gabriela Ivette Sandoval
- Written by: Roberto Andrade Ceron
- Produced by: Roberto Andrade Ceron; Luis Alberto González; Angelica Ramirez; Gabriela Ivette Sandoval; Carlos Silva Vallejo
- Starring: Roberto Andrade Ceron
- Cinematography: Carlos Arriaga
- Edited by: Gabriela Ivette Sandoval; Carlos Silva Vallejo
- Production company: D Raíz Producciones
- Release date: November 24, 2020 (Guadalajara)
- Running time: 91 minutes
- Country: Mexico
- Language: Spanish
- Budget: $200,000 Mexican pesos

Ok, It's Fine… (Spanish: Ok, está bien...) is a 2020 Mexican black-and-white comedy-drama film directed by Gabriela Ivette Sandoval (in her directorial debut) and written & starred by Roberto Andrade Ceron. It had an initial release in Mexico on November 24, 2020, as part of the 35th Guadalajara International Film Festival.

== Synopsis ==
Mariano is a frustrated thirty-year-old screenwriter who spends much of his time watching movies while complaining about current cinema and life. But everything changes when his cousin Ramiro from Querétaro settles in his house.

== Cast ==
The actors participating in this film are:

- Roberto Andrade Ceron as Mariano
- Isabella Argudín as Mariali
- Ángel Alvarado as Ramiro
- Gabriela de Corzo as Mariano's mom
- Fermín Martínez as Mariano's dad
- Juan Heladio as Himself
- Pepe Návar as Himself

== Financing ==
The film was financed by the Guadalajara International Film Festival in the "Guadalajara Construye" section, where it received the funds to finish the post-production phase.

== Release ==
It had an initial release in Mexico on November 24, 2020, as part of the 35th Guadalajara International Film Festival. It had planned a commercial theatrical release sometime in 2020, but it couldn't take place due to the COVID-19 pandemic. Finally, a drive-in theater tour was chosen starting on February 13, 2021, at the Teotihuacán Retrovisor drive-in theater.

== Reception ==
=== Critical reception ===
Fernando Zamora from the newspaper Milenio wrote: "It's logical that Ok, It's Fine… to turn out to be a magnificent comedy. At the level of, for example, Temporada de patos, by Fernando Eimbcke filmed, by the way, in the same place. Because Gabriela's work Ivette Sandoval and Roberto Andrade Cerón do not need vulgarities or commonplaces to make people laugh and think, they do not need anything other than the experiences of two creators capable of laughing, first, at themselves, at their own fears and shortcomings, at the imposed need for triumph at the cost of selling ideals and making movies that are basically worth it." Irving Torres Yllán from Cine NT wrote: "Ok, It's Fine… is a comedy that manages to become a drama without losing its way, with a moment that only demonstrates the lack of stability of the protagonist, who is funny despite everything."

=== Accolades ===
| Year | Award | Category | Recipient | Result | Ref. |
|---|---|---|---|---|---|
| 2020 | Guadalajara International Film Festival | Mezcal Award | Ok, It's Fine… | Nominated | |
| 2021 | Ariel Award | Best First Work | Ok, It's Fine… | Nominated | |
