= Magdyel Ugaz =

Peruvian actress

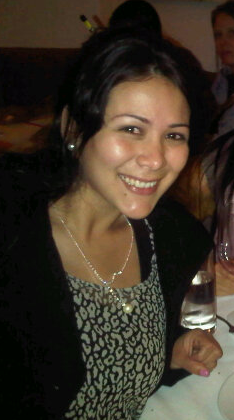
- Born: Magdyel Olibama Ugaz del Castillo; July 13, 1984 (age 42); Lima, Peru
- Occupations: Actress and TV Presenter
- Height: 164 cm (5 ft 5 in)

Magdyel Olibama Ugaz del Castillo is a Peruvian actress and television presenter. Among her several works, she is best known for her starring role as Teresa Collazos in the Al Fondo Hay Sitio television series.

== Career ==
At age thirteen, she entered a theater workshop at the National University of Engineering, presented by actor Reinaldo Arenas. Years later, after passing a casting, she joined the cast of Mil Oficios. In 2004 she played the folk singer Dina Páucar in the bio-miniseries Dina Páucar, the fight for a dream. That same year she joined the sitcom Asi Es La Vida playing the role Milagros.

In 2006 she starred in Black Butterfly, directed by Francisco José Lombardi. For her participation in this film she won the Best Actress award at the International Iberoamerican Festival of Ceará. This film won the Glauber Rocha Award for the best Latin American film at the Montreal World Film Festival, and Best Peruvian Film at the Lima Film Festival. In addition, she was nominated as Best Foreign Film at the 22nd Goya Awards.

Since 2009 she has made appearances in the television series Al Fondo Hay Sitio as "Teresita".

In 2010 she participated in the musical La Cage aux Folles, as Jacqueline, under the direction of Juan Carlos Fisher. At the beginning of 2012 she filmed in Buenos Aires the Peruvian-Italian-Argentinean film Diamond Santoro and the Rope of the Dead.

She debuted as a presenter in the third season of Minute to Win it in 2012 for América Televisión.

Ugaz joined the jury of the Peruvian version of Pequeños Gigantes. In theater, she participated in the comedy work The Blackout. She acted in the movie The Vanished Elephant in 2014.

Ugaz was a guest judge in 2016 for the dancing reality show El Gran Show. On December 8, 2016, the Guerrero movie premiered, in which she played the role of Doña Peta, the mother of Paolo Guerrero, the top scorer of the Peru national football team with 28 goal. For this role she won Best Supporting Actress at the Premios Luces in 2016. She is currently working on the sitcom De Vuelta Al Barrio for which she was nominated for Best Actress at the Premios Luces 2020.

== Personal life ==
In 2011, Ugaz admitted that in her desire to lose weight, she suffered from anorexia and bulimia, also caused by the comments of the press about her weight. In 2020 she had some of her eggs cryogenically frozen stating that she is not ready to be a mom since she hasn't found the right man yet, but wants to make sure when she does find the right partner it's not too late.

== Filmography ==
=== Television ===
Year	Title	Role
2001-2002	Mil Oficios	Mariana Roca Palacios #1
2003	Habla barrio	Sara
2004	Dina Páucar, la lucha por un sueño	Dina Páucar
2004-2006/2008	Así es la vida	Milagritos
2007	Los Jotitas	Lola
2007	Vírgenes de la cumbia 2	Lourdes
2007	Yuru: La princesa amazónica	Magdalena "Maki"
2008	Calle en llamas	Tonka
2009-2016	Al fondo hay sitio	Teresa "Teresita" Collazos Camacho
2012	Minuto para ganar	Host
2012	América espectáculos	Invited Guest Host
2013	Pequeños gigantes	Judge
2014	La hora de los peques	Host
2015	El Gran Show	Contestant (Withdrew week 7)
2017-2018	Colorina	Colorina / Fernanda Méndez Quiñones / Fabiola Almazán
2018	Yo soy	Judge
2019	Mujeres al mando	Host
2020-2021	De vuelta al barrio	Susana Chafloque
2026	Señora del destino	Belén

=== Movies ===
Year	Title	Role
2006	Black Butterfly	Ángela García
2008	Mañana te cuento 2	Kidnapper
2009	El premio	Teresa
2012	Diamond Santoro y la soga de los muertos	
2014	The Vanished Elephant	
2016	Guerrero	Dona Peta
2017	Cebiche de tiburón	
2018	Friends in trouble	
2020	Sí, mi amor	Ceci
2021	Medias hermanas	Marita
2022	Impregnated	Sofía
2022	Let's Tie the Knot, Honey!	Ceci
2022	Where's The Right Girl	Lucía
