= Don't Call Me Spinster 2 =

No me digas solterona 2
- Theatrical release poster
- Directed by: Ani Alva Helfer
- Written by: Ani Alva Helfer; Sandra Percich
- Produced by: Sandro Ventura; Macarena Ventura; Adolfo Aguilar; Israel Carmen
- Starring: Patricia Barreto; André Silva; Angélica Aragón; Marisol Aguirre; Anahí de Cárdenas; Marisa Minetti
- Cinematography: Hugo Shinki Higa D.F.P
- Music by: Santiago León Falcón
- Production companies: Big Bang Films; Diamond Films
- Release date: April 14, 2022
- Running time: 115 minutes
- Country: Peru
- Language: Spanish

Don't Call Me Spinster 2 (Spanish: No me digas solterona 2) is a 2022 Peruvian comedy film directed by Ani Alva Helfer, written by Helfer and Sandra Percich, starring Patricia Barreto and André Silva.

== Synopsis ==
To overcome the evils of love, Patricia becomes José Luis's cloth of tears: his best friend is unexpectedly devastated by a recent love breakup. Patricia agrees to advise him, but soon realizes that she is in love with him.

== Cast ==
- Patricia Barreto as Patricia "Patty" Ramírez.
- André Silva as José Luis "Pepe Lucho".
- Angélica Aragón as Tencha.
- Marisol Aguirre as María Gracia.
- Anahí de Cárdenas as Sol.
- Natalia Salas as Mariana.
- Rodrigo Sánchez Patiño as Ricardo "Richi".
- Fiorella Rodríguez as Mercedes "Meche".
- Maricarmen Marín as Emily.
- Slavic Yiddá as Chío.
- Claret Quea as "El Mota".
- Adolfo Aguilar as Gianluca.
- Regina Alcóver as Fernanda.
- Mabel Duclos.
- Marisa Minetti.
- Andrés Vílchez as Vasco.
- Rony Ramírez as "El Green".
- Javier Saveedra as Fernando.
- Ekaterina Konychev as Russian.
- Tito Vega as Waiter.
- Merly Morello as Dance teacher.
- Luciana León Barandiaran as Disco Entertainer.
- Alvaro Sedano.
- Thiago Vernal as Dance Student.

== Idealization ==
In March 2019, it was announced that a second part of the film, which would be filmed and recorded in Lima, Peru; during November 2019, it would be released in 2020, but the film was delayed until due time, due to the impact of the COVID-19 pandemic on the film industry, after a long time the second part was released on April 14, 2022.

== Release and reception ==
On its first day, the film managed to attract more than 26,000 spectators to the cinema, becoming the best national premiere of the year. Within 5 days of its release, the film attracted more than 100,000 people to theaters, ending its first week with more than 108,000 viewers. Over the weeks, the film managed to attract more than 200,000 viewers, becoming the most successful national premiere of the year.
