= La banda presidencial =

- Theatrical release poster
- Directed by: Eduardo Mendoza de Echave
- Written by: Eduardo Mendoza de Echave
- Starring: Emilram Cossio; Giovanni Ciccia; Andrés Salas; Haysen Percovich; Christian Ysla
- Music by: Karin Zielinski
- Production company: La Soga Producciones
- Release date: September 22, 2022
- Running time: 100 minutes
- Country: Peru
- Language: Spanish

La banda presidencial (lit. 'The presidential band') is a 2022 Peruvian political crime comedy film written and directed by Eduardo Mendoza de Echave. The film stars Emilram Cossio, Giovanni Ciccia, Andrés Salas, Haysen Percovich and Christian Ysla.

== Synopsis ==
Four forty-year-old friends, tired of their pathetic and routine existence, decide to change their lives from one day to the next by robbing the largest and most exclusive casino in Lima.

== Cast ==
The actors participating in this film are:

- Emilram Cossio
- Giovanni Ciccia
- Andrés Salas
- Haysen Percovich
- Christian Ysla
- Ebelin Ortiz
- Diego Bertie
- Katia Salazar
- Ximena Galiano

== Production ==
Principal photography began on March 16, 2020, but had to be suspended within hours of starting due to the COVID-19 pandemic.

== Release ==
The film premiered on September 22, 2022, in Peruvian theaters.
