= Renato Cisneros =

Peruvian journalist and author (born 1976)

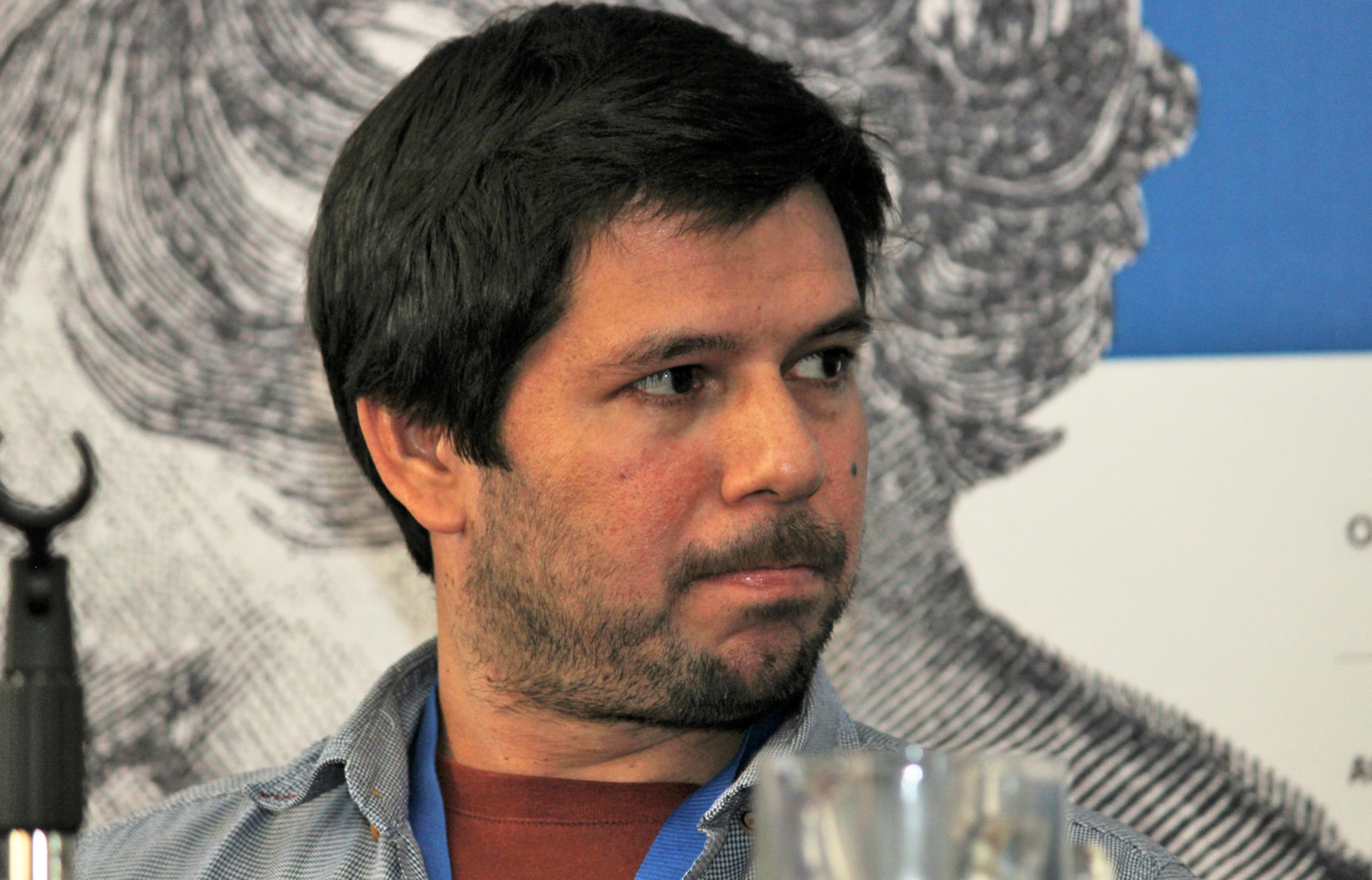
- Cisneros at the 2018 Santiago International Book Fair.
- Born: Lima, Peru
- Education: University of Lima; University of Miami
- Occupations: Journalist; poet
- Relatives: Luis Cisneros Vizquerra
- Writing career
- Notable awards: Prix Transfuge du Meilleur Roman de Littérature Hispanique

Renato Cisneros (born 1976, Lima) is a journalist and writer.

He is the son of the politician Luis Cisneros Vizquerra. He studied at the University of Lima and the University of Miami. He began his literary career as a poet, publishing his first volume of verse titled Ritual de los prójimos in 1999. He has also published four novels, including La distancia que nos separa (2015), which was a bestseller in Peru. The book won the 2017 Prix Transfuge du Meilleur Roman de Littérature Hispanique and was nominated for the Second Mario Vargas Llosa Biannual Award and for the Prix Médicis. It has been translated into English by Fionn Petch for Charco Press. Cisneros is also a regular contributor to print and broadcast media.
