= Medias hermanas =

Medias Hermanas
- Theatrical release poster
- Directed by: Ani Alva Helfer
- Written by: Italo Cordano
- Produced by: Gianella Neyra; Magdyel Ugaz
- Starring: Gianella Neyra; Magdyel Ugaz
- Cinematography: Matías Durán
- Edited by: Chino Pinto
- Music by: Jorge Miranda
- Production company: Tondero Producciones
- Release date: November 18, 2021
- Running time: 100 minutes
- Country: Peru
- Language: Spanish

Medias hermanas (lit. 'Half sisters') is a 2021 Peruvian comedy film directed by Ani Alva Helfer. Produced by and starring Gianella Neyra and Magdyel Ugaz, the film was released in theaters on November 18, 2021. It also features the acting participation of Tiago Correa, Leonardo Torres Vilar, Nacho Di Marco, Thiago Vernal and Miguel Dávalos. It is the first Peruvian film produced, starred and directed by women.

== Synopsis ==
Victoria and Marita discover that they are half-sisters during their father's wake. Victoria is going through financial problems and decides to sell the beach house that her father left her because it is about to be foreclosed on. To do so, she must obtain authorization from Marita, who agrees as long as they spend the summer together.

== Cast ==
- Gianella Neyra as Victoria.
- Magdyel Ugaz as Marita.
- Tiago Correa as Koki.
- Leonardo Torres Vilar as Roman.
- Nacho Di Marco as Gaitan.
- Miguel Dávalos as Luciano.
- Thiago Vernal as Agustín.

== Production ==
Medias hermanas was recorded in the first months of 2021, complying with strict biosafety protocols to safeguard the health of all staff and thus avoid contagion by COVID-19. It is one of the first film productions developed during the COVID-19 pandemic in Peru. A press conference was held on November 9, 2021.

== Reception ==
In its first weekend of release, Medias hermanas managed to attract 19,000 spectators to the cinema. To culminate it with more than 30,000 spectators, becoming the best national premiere since the reopening of theaters.
