= Impregnated (film) =

- Theatrical release poster
- Directed by: Gianfranco Quattrini
- Written by: Gianfranco Quattrini; Mariana Silva
- Produced by: Alejandro Cacetta; Juan Pablo García; Fernanda Perez; Gianfranco Quattrini; Rocio Taboada; Alex Zito; Pola Zito
- Starring: Magdyel Ugaz; Ximena Palomino; Benjamín Amadeo
- Cinematography: Massimo Ruggieri
- Edited by: Vanesa Ferrario
- Production companies: AZ Films; Film Tonic; Planta Madre Cine
- Distributed by: BF Distribution
- Release dates: May 26, 2022 (Peru); September 10, 2022 (Argentina)
- Running time: 100 minutes
- Countries: Peru; Argentina
- Language: Spanish

Impregnated (Spanish: Encintados, lit. 'Tied ups') is a 2022 romantic comedy film directed by Gianfranco Quattrini and written by Quattrini and Mariana Silva. It stars Magdyel Ugaz, Ximena Palomino and Benjamín Amadeo. It premiered on May 26, 2022, in Peruvian theaters, and on September 10, 2022, in Argentine theaters.

== Synopsis ==
Martina wants to be a mother, but she does not have the financial resources for an insemination. With the support of her girlfriend, she decides to seduce an Argentine tourist into getting her pregnant. When the involuntary donor discovers the plan, he returns to Peru to assume his paternity... and to make Martina fall in love with him.

== Cast ==
The actors participating in this film are:

- Magdyel Ugaz as Sofía
- Ximena Palomino as Martina
- Benjamín Amadeo as Facundo
- Sergio Galliani as Julián
- Jely Reátegui as Arlette
- Katia Condos as Úrsula
- Candela Vetrano as Belén
- Victorio D'Alessandro as Ramiro
- Job Mansilla as Charly
- Luis Ramírez as Inti Gabriel
- Santiago Suárez as Yeison
- Gerardo Vázquez as Manuel
- Daniel Menacho as Diego
- Alessandra Ottazzi as Motta
- Joaquín Escobar as Gérman

== Controversy ==
When the first trailer was released, it received a barrage of criticism from users due to the poor representation of lesbian and bisexual people featured in the trailer. Through the film's official social networks, the director and one of the protagonists of the film, Magdyel Ugaz, publicly apologized and regretted the confusion.
