= Sugar en aprietos =

- Theatrical release poster
- Directed by: José Salinas
- Written by: José Salinas
- Produced by: José Salinas
- Starring: David Zepeda; Alessandra Fuller
- Cinematography: Freddy Ordoñez
- Edited by: Jorge Ponce; Jenrri Vilcatoma
- Music by: Charlie Andre Figueroa
- Production companies: Leneas Performing Arts; Yaku Films
- Distributed by: Star Films
- Release date: October 6, 2022
- Running time: 95 minutes
- Country: Peru
- Language: Spanish

Sugar en aprietos (lit. 'Sugar Daddy in trouble') is a 2022 Peruvian comedy film written, directed and produced by José Salinas. The film stars David Zepeda and Alessandra Fuller. It premiered on October 6, 2022, in Peruvian theaters.

== Synopsis ==
Mariana is a talkative and fun young woman who has the opportunity to be sent to university thanks to the charity of a benefactor who sponsors the city's municipal orphanage where she has lived all her life and is an assistant to the institution.

== Cast ==
The actors participating in this film are:

- Alessandra Fuller
- David Zepeda
- Patricia Portocarrero
- Yvonne Frayssinet
- Maju Mantilla
- Andrés Vílchez
- Joaquín Escobar
- Andrea Luna
- Haydeé Cáceres
- Olga Zumarán
- Kukuli Morante
- Valeria Piazza
- Austin Palao
- Ricardo Rondón
- Tito Vega
- Leslie Stewart
- Javier Valdés
- José Dammert
- Matías Raygada
- Mariano Ramírez
