= University of Sciences and Arts of Latin America =

Private University in Peru

- Universidad de Ciencias y Artes de América Latina
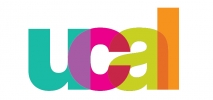
- Type: Private
- Established: February 17, 2010; 16 years ago
- Founder: Mg. Luis Deza
- Affiliations: IEduca
- Rector: Dr. Mario Gutiérrez
- Location: Av. La Molina 3755, Sol de La Molina, La Molina, Lima, Peru
- Campus: Urban
- Colours
- Nickname: UCAL
- Website: ucal.edu.pe

The University of Sciences and Arts of Latin America (Spanish: Universidad de Ciencias y Artes de América Latina; UCAL) is a private university that was founded on February 17, 2010 by the Peruvian magister and economist Luis Deza. Currently it is located in La Molina District and has 10 professional careers in 4 faculties. It is the first university in which it specializes enough in Architecture and Graphic Design Advertising, also known as the University of Creativity of Peru.

== History ==
In 2010, Luis Carpio Ascuña, president of the National Council for the Authorization of Universities (CONAFU), delivered the Peruvian economist Mg. Luis Deza, who was the promoter of Promotora de Servicios y Productos Educativos (PRODSE). On February 17 of the same year, 1 was approved the foundation of the University of Sciences and Arts of Latin America.

== Careers and Faculties ==
=== Faculty of Architecture ===
- Architecture
- Interior architecture

=== Faculty of Communication ===
- Audiovisual Communication and Cinema
- Communication and Advertising Transmedia
- Communication and Corporate Image
- Communication and Journalism
- Communications

=== Faculty of Design ===
- Advertising Graphic Design
- Strategic Graphic Design

=== Faculty of Business and Innovation ===
- Marketing and Innovation
