= Doblemente embarazada (2021 film) =

- Theatrical release poster
- Directed by: Eduardo Mendoza de Echave
- Written by: Eduardo Mendoza de Echave
- Produced by: Jorge Barboza; Marcos Camacho; Jorge Constantino; Miguel Valladares; Diego Vives
- Starring: Carolina Cano; Andrés Wiese; Nicolás Galindo; Daniela Camaiora
- Cinematography: Mario Bassino
- Edited by: Renato Constantino
- Production companies: Tondero Producciones; Claro Video
- Distributed by: Tondero Producciones
- Release date: September 30, 2021
- Running time: 103 minutes
- Country: Peru
- Language: Spanish

Doblemente embarazada (lit. 'Doubly pregnant') is a 2021 Peruvian comedy film written and directed by Eduardo Mendoza de Echave. It is a remake of the 2019 Mexican film Doblemente embarazada. It stars Carolina Cano, Andrés Wiese, Nicolás Galindo and Daniela Camaiora.

== Synopsis ==
Cristina (Carolina Cano) is a young girl about to marry Javier (Andrés Wiese). At her bachelorette party, she has an unexpected reunion with Felipe (Nicolás Galindo), the former love of all her life.

== Cast ==
The actors participating in this film are:

- Carolina Cano as Cristina
- Nicolas Galindo as Felipe
- Andrés Wiese as Javier
- Pablo Agüero as Nurse
- Daniela Camaiora as Catalina

== Production ==
The film begins filming at the end of 2019, in total there were 4 weeks of filming.

== Release ==
The film had planned to be released on April 9, 2020, in Peruvian theaters, but the premiere was canceled due to the closure of theaters due to the COVID-19 pandemic. The film premiered on September 30, 2021, in Peruvian theaters.
