= José Manuel Peláez =

Peruvian actor (born 1988)

Jose Manuel Pelaez (born February 25, 1988) is a Peruvian actor. He is best known for portraying "El Gordo" in Mañana Te Cuento, and Mañana Te Cuento 2.

Jose was born on February 25, 1988, in Lima, Peru to a Spanish father and Peruvian mother. He grew up in Lima. In 2004, after three years of being part of Iñigo Acting Group, he was called by Gustavo Sanchez (well-known Peruvian producer) to act in 'Mañana Te Cuento'. After Mañana Te Cuento, he left to Oviedo, Spain to commence with his studies at the business school. While in Spain, he received an Erasmus scholarship to study in the Universiteit Maastricht in the province of Limburg, The Netherlands. Before heading to Maastricht he received another call for an acting job in the sequel, Mañana Te Cuento 2. Currently he is finishing his studies focusing on business. Once graduated, he plans to enroll in the RESAD in Madrid, Spain.
