= Doblemente embarazada (2019 film) =

- Directed by: Koko Stambuk
- Written by: Diego Ayala
- Produced by: Maite Perroni
- Starring: Maite Perroni; Matías Novoa; Gustavo Egelhaaf; Verónica Jaspeado
- Cinematography: Rodrigo Sandoval
- Edited by: Víctor Manuel Medina
- Music by: Ernesto King; Koko Stambuk
- Production companies: SDB Films; Corazón Films; Tondero Producciones
- Distributed by: Corazón Films
- Release date: 20 December 2019 (Mexico)
- Running time: 98 minutes
- Country: Mexico
- Language: Spanish

Doblemente embarazada is a 2019 Mexican comedy film directed by Koko Stambuk. The film premiered on 20 December 2019. It stars Maite Perroni, who serves as executive producer. Additionally, Perroni shares credits with Matías Novoa, Gustavo Egelhaaf, and Verónica Jaspeado. The plot revolves around Cristina, who discovered she is pregnant a few days before her wedding; Happiness disappears after realizing she doesn't know who is the dad. This is due to a crazy encounter with her ex-boyfriend during the bachelorette party.

== Plot ==
Cristina (Maite Perroni) is about to marry Javier (Gustavo Egelhaaf). One night, her friend (Verónica Jaspeado) takes her to celebrate her bachelorette party, where she has an unexpected encounter with her former lover in life. Within weeks, Cristina learns that she is pregnant, and does not know if the father is from her future husband Javier, or Felipe (Matías Novoa). Surprises increase when, in the fourth month of pregnancy, the doctor tells Cristina the results of the paternity test.

== Cast ==
- Maite Perroni as Cristina
- Matías Novoa as Felipe
- Gustavo Egelhaaf as Javier
- Verónica Jaspeado as Catalina

== See also ==
- Doblemente embarazada (2021 film) (a Peruvian remake)
