= My Best Enemy (2026 film) =

- Theatrical release poster
- Spanish: Mi mejor enemiga
- Directed by: Saskia Bernaola
- Written by: Rogger Vergara Adrianzén; Paco Bardales; Dorian Fernández-Moris
- Produced by: Chichi Fernández Moris
- Starring: Nataniel Sánchez
- Cinematography: Andres Paul Magallanes
- Edited by: Chemo Loli
- Production company: AV Films
- Release dates: February 3, 2026 (Real Plaza Primavera); February 5, 2026 (Peru)
- Running time: 105 minutes
- Country: Peru
- Languages: Spanish; English

My Best Enemy (Spanish: Mi mejor enemiga) is a 2026 Peruvian comedy film directed by Saskia Bernaola (in her directorial debut) and written by Rogger Vergara Adrianzén, Paco Bardales and Dorian Fernández-Moris. It stars Nataniel Sánchez, accompanied by Carlos Casella, Kukuli Morante, Fiorella Luna, Omar García, Carla Arriola, Guillermo Castañeda and Mateo Garrido Lecca, and the acting debut of Karina Rivera and Ricardo Bonilla.

== Synopsis ==
Valeria reunites with her former best friend after 25 years when a class reunion trip rekindles old rivalries, unresolved conflicts, and a series of misadventures.

== Cast ==
- Nataniel Sánchez as Victoria
- Carlos Casella as Diego
- Kukuli Morante as Lourdes
- Fiorella Luna as Deborah
- Omar García as Harry
- Carla Arriola as Camila
- Guillermo Castañeda as Moncada
- Mateo Garrido Lecca as Lolo
- Ricardo Bonilla as Timoteo
- Fernando Bakovic as Repitente
- Patricia Portocarrero

== Release ==
The film had its world premiere on February 3, 2026, at the Real Plaza Primavera, followed by a wide national theatrical release on February 5.

== Box office ==
In its first week on the billboard, it debuted in third place, attracting 14,000 espectadores. In its first weekend, it attracted more than 100,000 viewers. In its third weekend, the film reached 273,828 viewers.
