= 2025 in Peru =

- Decades: 2000s; 2010s; 2020s; 2030s
- See also: Other events of 2025; Timeline of Peruvian history

Events in the year 2025 in Peru.

== Incumbents ==
- President:
  - Dina Boluarte (until 10 October); José Jerí (acting, since 10 October)
- Prime Minister:
  - Gustavo Adrianzén (until 13 May); Eduardo Arana Ysa (until 14 October); Ernesto Álvarez Miranda (since 14 October)

== Events ==
=== January ===
- 3 January — In Mariscal Luzuriaga Province (Ancash), a bus falls into the Pacosbamba River, leaving eight dead and 25 injured.
- 20 January
  - In Trujillo, a criminal organization detonates an explosive in front of a public ministry prosecutor's office, injuring two people.
  - Pope Francis dissolves the Sodalitium of Christian Life (Society of Apostolic Life based in Peru) after serious irregularities.

=== February ===
- 11 February — Héctor Miguel Cabrejos Vidarte officially resigns as Archbishop of Trujillo amid criticism over his failure to stop abuses by the Catholic organization Sodalitium Christianae Vitae when he was president of the Peruvian Episcopal Conference.
- 14 February — A bridge along the Pan-American Highway collapses near Chancay as a bus and a car is passing over, killing two people.
- 18 February — A man believed to be under the influence of alcohol or drugs is arrested after hitting the Inca-era Twelve-angled stone in Cuzco with a hammer, causing "irreversible damage".
- 21 February — Real Plaza Trujillo roof collapse: The roof of the food court of the Real Plaza Trujillo collapses, killing eight people.

=== March ===
- 4 March — The trial of former president Pedro Castillo for his failed attempt to dissolve Congress in 2022 begins.
- 16 March — Cumbia singer and Armonía 10 member Paul Flores is killed in a shooting in San Juan de Lurigancho.
- 17 March — A 30-day state of emergency is declared in Lima due to rising violence.
- 21 March — The Congress of the Republic approves a motion of censure against Interior Minister Juan José Santiváñez , following the increase in insecurity nationwide.

=== April ===
- 2 April – US President Donald Trump imposes a 10% tariff on imports from Peru.
- 15 April – Former president Ollanta Humala and his wife Nadine Heredia are convicted and sentenced to 15 years' imprisonment for money laundering over their involvement in the Odebrecht scandal.

=== May ===
- 2 May – The Peruvian Navy ship Ucayali collides with an oil platform at the junction of the Napo and Amazon rivers, killing two people.
- 4 May – The bodies of 13 gold miners abducted in the previous week are found inside a mine in Pataz province.
- 8 May – American-born dual citizen Robert Prevost, who served as bishop of Chiclayo from 2014 to 2023, is elected Pope and takes the name Leo XIV.
- 13 May – Gustavo Adrianzen resigns as prime minister shortly before a scheduled no-confidence vote against him in Congress.
- 14 May – Eduardo Arana Ysa is appointed as prime minister by President Boluarte.
- 20 May –
  - A bus crashes in Otuzco province, La Libertad, killing four people.
  - A KAI KT-1P of the Peruvian Air Force crashes in an islet south of the Paracas Peninsula, leaving its pilot missing.
- 21 May – A shooting on Paseo de la República Avenue in Lima kills two people and injures six others, including a national police colonel.
- 28 May – A court in Germany dismisses a case brought by Huaraz-based farmer Saúl Luciano Lliuya against the energy firm RWE accusing it of contributing to glacial melting in Peru through its carbon emissions.
- 30 May – The Ministry of Culture orders a 42% reduction in the land area of the Nazca lines reserve.

=== June ===
- 8 June – The Ministry of Culture reverses its 30 May decision ordering a 42% reduction in the land area of the Nazca lines reserve.
- 15 June – A magnitude 5.6 earthquake hits Lima and Callao, killing two people.
- 19 June – The Lima restaurant Maido is named the top restaurant in the 2025 edition of The World's 50 Best Restaurants list.

=== July ===
- 2 July – A 51-year-old man under the influence of alcohol rams his vehicle into a steakhouse in La Molina District, Lima, injuring at least four people and causing serious damage to the premises.
- 3 July – Archaeologists announce the discovery of a 3,500 year-old Caral-era city named Peñico in Barranca province.
- 12 July – An indigenous Wampi patrol is ambushed near Fortaleza in Amazonas Department.
- 25 July – A double-decker bus overturns in Palca District, Junín Department, killing 18 people and injuring 48 others.

=== August ===
- 5 August – Colombia accuses Peru of fully annexing the disputed island of Santa Rosa along their common border in the Amazon River.
- 11 August – Peru and Indonesia sign a Comprehensive Economic Partnership Agreement and related cooperation accords, marking 50 years of diplomatic ties.
- 13 August – President Boluarte signs an amnesty law covering members of the security forces who fought the Shining Path during its insurgency in the 1980s and 1990s.
- 14 August –
  - Ten people are injured in an explosion that damages 25 houses in Trujillo.
  - Former president Martín Vizcarra is placed under preventive detention on charges of bribery. Following an appeal, he is ordered released on 3 September.
- 29 August – A bomb attack is carried out on a branch of Compartamos Banco in Lima.
- 31 August – A bomb attack is carried out on another branch of Compartamos Banco in Lima.

=== September ===
- 1 September – An Indonesian diplomat is shot dead in Lima in a suspected contract killing.
- 3 September – Former president Alejandro Toledo is sentenced to 13 years' imprisonment for accepting $35 million in bribes from Odebrecht in exchange for allowing the construction of a highway.
- 5 September – Congress rejects a proposal to establish the Yavari Mirim Indigenous Reserve that would have officially protected five uncontacted tribes from outside encroachment in Loreto Department.
- 15 September – Residents carry out a blockade of the Machu Picchu railway line in protest over the selection of bus companies transporting visitors to the site, forcing the evacuation of 1,600 tourists.
- 25 September – A minibus collides with two trucks in Moquegua, killing 14 people.

=== October ===
- 6 October – The Andean Community finds Peru liable for failing to meet its commitments to curb illegal gold mining and mercury trafficking in a case filed by indigenous communities in the Peruvian Amazon.
- 10 October – Congress removes President Dina Boluarte from office due to "permanent moral incapacity", resulting in the legislature's president, José Jerí, becoming interim leader.
- 14 October – Ernesto Álvarez Miranda is appointed as prime minister.
- 15 October – One person is killed while 102 others are injured following violent protests against crime in Lima.
- 21 October – A state of emergency is declared in Lima due to an increase in crime.
- 27 October – A Mil Mi-17 helicopter of the Peruvian Army crashes in Chagal, Pataz District, killing one of the occupants on board.

=== November ===
- 3 November – Peru severs diplomatic relations with Mexico in response to former prime minister Betssy Chávez being granted asylum at the Mexican embassy in Lima amid an investigation against her on charges relating to the 2022 Peruvian self-coup attempt.
- 6 November – Congress votes 63–34 with two abstentions to declare Mexican president Claudia Sheinbaum persona non grata over the Mexican government's decision to grant asylum to Betssy Chávez.
- 12 November – A bus collides with a pickup truck before falling off a ravine into the Ocoña River in Arequipa Department, killing 37 people and injuring 13 others.
- 26 November – Former president Martín Vizcarra is sentenced to 14 years' imprisonment for taking $611,000 in bribes when he was governor of Moquegua Department.
- 27 November – Former president Pedro Castillo and former prime minister Betssy Chávez are sentenced to 11.5 years' imprisonment by the Supreme Court on charges of conspiracy to commit a rebellion over the 2022 Peruvian self-coup attempt.
- 28 November – President Jeri declares a state of emergency in areas along the Chile–Peru border in response to an influx of migrants exiting Chile.

=== December ===
- 1 December – A landslide along the banks of the Ucayali River sinks a ferry and severely damages another vessel near Icaría, Ucayali Department, leaving at least 12 people dead, 25 injured, and 40 missing.
- 4 December – Ten people are killed in a fire at a restaurant in Huancane, Puno Department.
- 28 December — A magnitude 6.2 earthquake hits Ancash Department, injuring 53 people.
- 30 December — 2025 Ollantaytambo District train collision: Two trains collide head-on along the single-track Machu Picchu railway between Ollantaytambo and Aguas Calientes in Cusco Department, killing one engineer and injuring 40 others.
- 31 December —
  - The government authorizes an emergency decree allowing private investment in the state oil company Petroperu.
  - Three people are killed while seven others are reported missing following an attack on an informal mine in Pataz province, La Libertad Department.

== Art and entertainment ==
- List of Peruvian submissions for the Academy Award for Best International Feature Film

== Holidays ==
- 1 January – New Year's Day
- 17 April – Maundy Thursday
- 18 April – Good Friday
- 1 May – Labour Day
- 7 June – Flag Day
- 29 June – Feast of Saints Peter and Paul
- 28–29 July – Independence Day
- 30 August – Santa Rosa de Lima
- 8 October – Battle of Angamos
- 1 November – All Saints' Day
- 8 December – Immaculate Conception
- 9 December – Battle of Ayacucho
- 25 December – Christmas Day

== Deaths ==
- 7 January – Walter Martos, 67, military officer and politician, prime minister (2020) and minister of defence (2019–2020).
- 22 January – Daniel Abugattás, 69, member (2006-2016) and President (2011-2012) of Congress.
- 31 January – Carlos Ferrero, 83, prime minister (2003–2005), member (1992–2006) and President (2000–2003) of Congress.
- 10 February – Oscar Medelius, 69, member of Congress (1995–2000) and president of Sport Boys (1995).
- 13 April – Mario Vargas Llosa, 89, writer (The Time of the Hero, The War of the End of the World, The Feast of the Goat), Nobel Prize laureate (2010), presidential candidate (1990).
- 2 October – Javier Manrique, 56, actor (Camera Café).
- 19 November – José Navarro Grau, 90, politician, minister of education (1965–1966) and mayor of Chincha Alta (1993–2002, 2007–2010).
- 17 December – Oscar Allain, 103, painter.
- 26 December – Carlos Anderson, 65, deputy (since 2021).
