= 2026 in Peru =

- Decades: 2000s; 2010s; 2020s
- See also: Other events of 2026; Timeline of Peruvian history

Events in the year 2026 in Peru.

== Incumbents ==
- President: José Jerí (until 17 February); José María Balcázar (18 February – 28 July); Keiko Fujimori (since 28 July)
- Prime Minister: Ernesto Álvarez Miranda (until 22 February); Denisse Miralles (24 February – 17 March); Luis Arroyo Sánchez (17 March –– 28 July); Luis Galarreta (since 28 July)

== Events ==
=== February ===
- 17 February – Congress removes President José Jerí from office for failing to disclose meetings with Chinese businessmen.
- 18 February – Congress elects José María Balcázar as interim president.
- 22 February – A Mil Mi-17 helicopter of the Peruvian Air Force crashes in Chala Viejo, Chala District, killing all 15 people on board.
- 23 February –
  - Hernando de Soto is announced as the new Prime Minister of Peru. Later that day, de Soto declines the appointment.
  - Two people are killed in a landslide in Arequipa.
- 24 February – Denisse Miralles is inaugurated as prime minister.
- 25 February – A state of emergency is declared in more than 700 districts nationwide due to flooding and landslides.

=== March ===
- 5 March – The Inter-American Court of Human Rights holds the Peruvian state responsible for the 1997 death of a woman who died from the forced sterilization program of president Alberto Fujimori and orders it to pay $340,000 in compensation to the victim's heirs.
- 7 March – At least 44 people are injured in a bombing at a nightclub in Trujillo, La Libertad Department. Three people are arrested the next day.
- 17 March – Denisse Miralles resigns as prime minister before a confirmatory vote could be taken in Congress. She is replaced by Luis Arroyo Sánchez.
- 23 March –
  - A tourist bus plunges into a ravine in Huarochirí Province, killing 10 people and injuring 15.
  - A minibus collides with a truck in Caylloma Province, killing 13 people.

=== April ===
- 12 April – 2026 Peruvian general election (first round): Keiko Fujimori and Roberto Sánchez advance to a runoff vote, garnering a respective 17.18% and 12.03%.
- 22 April – 2026 Peruvian general election: Defense minister Carlos Díaz Dañino and foreign minister Hugo de Zela resign in protest against president Balcázar's decision to defer a purchase agreement to buy 24 F-16 fighter jets from the United States pending the result of the presidential election.
- 28 April – A minibus collides with a fuel truck in Cerillos, Department of Puno, killing seven people.

=== May ===
- 19 May – A magnitude 5.8 earthquake hits Ica Department, injuring 27 people.

=== June ===
- 7 June – 2026 Peruvian general election (second round): Keiko Fujimori is elected president with 50.135% of the vote and a margin of less than 50,000 votes over Roberto Sánchez.
- 16 June – A bus overturns in Huánuco Department, killing 11 people and injuring 15 others.

=== July ===
- 17 July – A minibus falls into a 500 m (1,600 ft) ravine in Cajamarca Department, killing 14 people.
- 18 July – A magnitude 5.5 earthquake hits Junín Department, killing five people and injuring 71 others.
- 22 July – Ten members of the same family, including five children, are killed in a house fire in the La Victoria District of Lima.
- 24 July – The United States imposes a 12.5% tariff on Peru, citing the presence of alleged forced labor in the supply chain.
- 25 July – A collision between two buses in Tacna kills five people and injures 16 others.
- 28 July – Keiko Fujimori is sworn in as president, succeeding José María Balcázar.
- 29 July – Luis Galarreta is appointed prime minister.

=== August ===
- 1 August – A Cessna 208 Caravan carrying tourists to view the Nazca Lines crashes near Socos, killing 11 passengers and two pilots.
- 6 August – A magnitude 5.0 earthquake hits Junín Department, injuring 12 people.
- 7 August – A magnitude 4.4 earthquake hits Junín Department, killing one person.
- 8 August – A minibus collides with a truck in Espinar Province, Cuzco Department, killing 13 people.
- 20 August – A magnitude 6.7 earthquake hits Ayacucho Department, injuring three people.
- 24 August — Four people are sentenced to up to 35 years' imprisonment for the 2023 murder of indigenous environmental activist Quinto Inuma Alvarado.

=== September ===
- 2 September – Peru cuts diplomatic relations with Iran, accusing Tehran of escalating the 2026 Iran war and citing a historic pacifist stance.

=== October ===
- 4 October – 2026 Peruvian regional and municipal elections

=== November ===
- 3 November – An AgustaWestland AW109K helicopter of the Peruvian Army crashes in El Cenepa District, Condorcanqui province, during a demining operation, killing one passenger.
- 11 November — Pope Leo XIV visits Peru.
- 21 November — A magnitude 6.7 earthquake hits Junín, killing one person.

== Art and entertainment ==
- List of Peruvian submissions for the Academy Award for Best International Feature Film

== Holidays ==
- 1 January – New Year's Day
- 2 April – Maundy Thursday
- 3 April – Good Friday
- 1 May – Labour Day
- 7 June – Flag Day
- 29 June – Feast of Saints Peter and Paul
- 28–29 July – Independence Day
- 30 August – Santa Rosa de Lima
- 8 October – Battle of Angamos
- 1 November – All Saints' Day
- 8 December – Immaculate Conception
- 9 December – Battle of Ayacucho
- 25 December – Christmas Day

== Deaths ==
- 11 January – Nelson Manrique, 78, historian and sociologist.
- 12 February – Saúl Cornejo, 79, singer and composer (We All Together).
- 21 February – Lucinda Vásquez, 67, teacher, member of the Congress (since 2021).
- 15 March – Napoleón Becerra, 61, trade unionist and politician, presidential candidate (2026).
- 9 April – Héctor Vargas Haya, 98, deputy (1963–1968, 1980–1990), president of the Chamber of Deputies (1988–1989).
- 26 May – Carlos Oliva, 61, economist, director of the Central Reserve Bank (2015–2016, since 2021) and minister of economy and finance (2018–2019).
- 31 July – Pepe Villalobos, 96, musician and composer
- 1 September – Edith Barr, 90, singer (death announced on this date)
- 6 September – Rosa Fung Pineda, archaeologist (death announced on this date)
- 11 September – Yuca, 75, comedian and actor (La paisana Jacinta en búsqueda de Wasaberto, ¡Asu mare! 2)
- 19 September – Susy Aponte, 43, journalist and politician
- 30 October – Richard Alarcón Urrutia, 74, Roman Catholic prelate, bishop of Tarma (2001–2014) and archbishop of Cusco (since 2014)
- 31 October – Jorge Carrión Pavlich, 76, Roman Catholic prelate, bishop of Puno (since 2000)
- 13 November – Mondonguito, 67, comedian
