= 2023 in Peru =

- Decades: 2000s; 2010s; 2020s
- See also: Other events of 2023; Timeline of Peruvian history

Events in the year 2023 in Peru.

== Incumbents ==
- President:
  - Dina Boluarte
- Prime Minister:
  - Alberto Otárola

== Events ==
=== January ===
- 9 January – Juliaca massacre: At least 18 people are killed and over 100 others are injured when the Peruvian National Police fire upon demonstrations in Juliaca.
- 10 January – Prime Minister Alberto Otárola imposes a three-day curfew in the Puno region from 8 pm to 4 am (PET) the following day in an effort to repress the protests.
- 12 January – 2022–2023 Peruvian protests: The city of Cusco is placed under red alert after clashes between protesters and police leave one dead and 17 injured.
- 19 January – Thousands of protesters march in Lima demanding the resignation of president Dina Boluarte as the number of fatalities from clashes between demonstrators and police exceeds 50.
- 21 January – Peru indefinitely closes its iconic Machu Picchu historic site due to the ongoing unrest which has killed dozens of people. Around 500 foreign nationals are currently stranded in Peru.
- 28 January – At least 24 people are killed when a bus plunges off a cliff in the El Alto District.

=== February ===
- 5 February – The government extends the state of emergency in the Apurímac, Arequipa, Cuzco, Madre de Dios, Moquegua, Puno, and Tacna departments until April 7.
- 7 February – The Peruvian environment ministry reports that the H5N1 influenza A virus has killed 585 sea lions and more than 55,000 birds within its protected areas in "recent weeks".
- 10 February – The Parliament of Peru approves a motion to file criminal charges against former president Pedro Castillo. The charges include criminal organization, traffic of influences and collusion of power.
- 11 February – Seven police officers are killed and another is injured when their vehicle is ambushed in Valle de los Ríos Apurímac, Ene y Mantaro, in a suspected attack by remnants of Shining Path.

=== March ===
- 7-20 March – Cyclone Yaku causes heavy rains, flooding, landslides, and destruction across northern Peru, displacing thousands and killing at least eight before dissipating.
- 18 March – An earthquake in Ecuador causes two fatalities and several injuries in Peru.

=== April ===
- 3 April – Peru was withdrawn as host of the 2023 FIFA U-17 World Cup, citing the inability of the host country to fulfill its commitments to completing the infrastructure required to stage the tournament.
- 4 April – The Congress of Peru votes against the petition of impeachment of President Dina Boluarte over the alleged killings of protesters during the ongoing protests, amid a worsening volatility in the country's politics.
- 10 April – At least 10 people are killed and 25 others are injured in a bus crash in the Department of Lima.

=== May ===
- 6 May – A mine fire occurs in Yanaquihua District, Condesuyos Province.

=== July ===
- 28 July – President Dina Boluarte delivers an annual Independence Day message amid ongoing protests and social unrest.

=== August ===
- 10-18 August – The 27th Lima Film Festival is held in Lima, featuring in-person and virtual screenings under the theme "#LetsBeProtagonists".

=== September ===
- 16 September – Thousands protest in Lima supporting the National Board of Justice and opposing Congress’ efforts to remove its members.

=== November ===
- 4-8 November 2023 – Universitario and Alianza Lima play the Liga 1 Finals, drawing 1–1 on 4 November and Universitario winning 2–0 on 8 November to claim their 27th league title and first in ten years.
- 25-27 November – Jaime Villanueva, Miguel Ángel Girao, and Abel Hurtado are arrested in the Operation Valkyrie V scandal.

== Deaths ==
- 10 March – Tongo, 65, singer and comedian.
