= 2021 in Peru =

- Decades: 2000s; 2010s; 2020s; 2030s
- See also: Other events of 2021; Timeline of Peruvian history

Events in the year 2021 in Peru.

== Incumbents ==
=== Prior to elections ===
| Photo | Post | Name |
|---|---|---|
| | President of Peru | Francisco Sagasti |
| | Prime Minister of Peru | Violeta Bermúdez |

=== After the elections ===
| Photo | Post | Name |
|---|---|---|
| | President of Peru | Pedro Castillo |
| | Prime Minister of Peru | Guido Bellido |

== Events ==
=== January ===
- 6 January – President Sagasti announces the purchase of 38 million COVID-19 vaccines from Sinopharm.
- 27 January – A lockdown is enforced in central Peru until February 14 as hospitals near collapse. There have been 1,107,239 confirmed cases of COVID-19 and 40,107 deaths. Studies of the Sinopharm BIBP vaccine will continue during the lockdown. The first one million doses of vaccination are expected to begin in February.

=== February ===
- 5 February – Venezuelan immigrants and refugees complain of discrimination and xenophobia leading up to elections.
- 7 February – The first batch of 300,000 Sinopharm vaccines arrives in Lima.
- 13 February –
  - Óscar Ugarte is sworn in as the fifth health minister in a year after Pilar Mazzetti resigned in scandal after former president Martin Vizcarra jumped to the front of the line for a COVID-19 vaccine.
  - Foreign minister Elizabeth Astete resigns after it is shown that government employees were given priority over health workers for COVID-19 vaccines.
- 21 February – Vacunagate, a scandal related to the application of COVID-19 vaccines to politicians, business leaders, and religious leaders before essential health workers, the collapse of the health system, and the lack of oxygen, threatens the stability of the upcoming elections. Former footballer George Forsyth, leads as a candidate for president with 20% in the polls, but his candidacy has been suspended by the Jurado Nacional Electoral (JNE).

=== March ===
- 2 March – The government does not appeal a court ruling allowing Ana Estrada, 44, the right to die. Local law still prohibits anyone from assisting voluntary euthanasia.
- 7 March – Rafael López Aliaga (Popular Renewal party) is accused of urging a coup d'état after calling for resignation of Interim President Francisco Sagasti.
- 15 March – Hundreds of transport workers go on strike and block highways nationwide to demand reduced fuel and toll costs.

=== April ===
- 2 April – Verónika Mendoza, candidate for president (New Peru), calls Venezuelan President Nicolás Maduro a dictator during a press conference with the Asociación de Prensa Extranjera en el Perú (APEP).
- 28 April – Sexual rights organization Promsex officially petitions the courts to overturn a 2009 Constitutional Court ruling banning free distribution of emergency contraception.

=== May ===
- 23 May - San Miguel del Ene attack – 18 people are killed in an attack in the Valle de los Ríos Apurímac, Ene y Mantaro (VRAEM) conflict region, where the group operates.

=== June ===
- 6 June – 2021 Peruvian general election – Pedro Castillo has a slight lead with 97.3% of the votes counted.
- 11 June – Left-wing groups around the world warn that Keiko Fujimori is trying to steal the election. Without any evidence, she has claimed victory.
- 12 June – Fujimori leads a protest seeking to annul the votes of the 2021 election.
- 14 June – An investigation is launched into Fujimori supporters and the Popular Force party for incidents of harassment of electoral authorities via the Internet.
- 23 June – 2021 Mala earthquake: A magnitude 5.9 earthquake strikes near the capital Lima, killing one and causing damage.
- 24 June – The JNE suspends magistrate Luis Arce to allow compliance with constitutional requirements, and the electoral calendar.
- 26 June – Supporters of both Pedro Castillo and Keiko Fujimori hold rival protests in Lima over the delayed election results.

=== July ===
- 28 July – Pedro Castillo is sworn in as President of Peru.
- 31 July - At least 40 people were injured after a 6.1 magnitude earthquake struck Sullana.
- Mario Marcos López, an Asháninka Indigenous environmental defender, is shot dead in Pasco.

=== August ===
- 24 August – The government approves the Yanapay (Help) Peru subsidy for households in poverty and extreme poverty.

=== October ===
- President Castillo forces PM Guido Bellido to resign during a cabinet reshuffle, amid controversies over his past misogynist and homophobic statements.

=== November ===
- 25 November – An impeachment motion against Castillo is presented by 28 legislators from Avanza País, Fuerza Popular, and Renovación Popular.
- 28 November – 2021 Northern Peru earthquake

== Deaths ==
=== January ===
- 16 January – Rapper One, 41, rapper; COVID-19.
- 17 January – Víctor Crisólogo, 68, politician, member of Congress (2011–2016); COVID-19.
- 18 January – Carlos Burga, 68, Olympic boxer (1972); COVID-19.
- 19 January – Carlos Tapia García, 79, politician, member of Congress (1985–1990) and Truth and Reconciliation Commission (2001–2003); COVID-19.

=== February ===
- 11 February
  - Teresa Burga, 86, artist.
  - Javier Neves, 67, lawyer and academic, Minister of Labour and Promotion of Employment (2004–2005); COVID-19.
- 16 February – Ítalo Villarreal, journalist.
- 17 February – Carlos Chacón Galindo, 86, politician, Provincial Mayor of Cusco Province (1967–1969, 1987–1989).
- 22 February – Hipólito Chaiña Contreras, 67, doctor and politician, member of Congress (since 2020); COVID-19.
- 26 February
  - Herasmo García, 28, environmentalist and indigenous leader (Organización Regional de la Asociación Interétnica de Desarrollo de la Selva Peruana, Aidesep); murdered (body found on this date)

=== March ===
- 6 March
  - Miguel Miranda, 54, football player (Sporting Cristal, Universitario, national team) and manager.
  - Pedro Novoa, 46, writer and educator; colon cancer.
- 11 March – Ernesto Ráez Mendiola, 84, stage director, actor and theater teacher.
- 18 March – Luis Bedoya Reyes, 102, politician, Mayor of Lima (1964–1969), member of the Constituent Assembly (1978–1980) and minister of Justice (1963).
- 19 March – Luis Armando Bambarén Gastelumendi, 93, auxiliary bishop of Roman Catholic Archdiocese of Lima (1968–1978), bishop of Roman Catholic Diocese of Chimbote (1983–2003) and president of the Episcopal Conference of Peru (1999–2002); COVID-19.
- 25 March – Manuel Dammert, 72, sociologist and politician, member of Congress (1985–1992, 2013–2019); COVID-19.

=== April ===
- 1 April – Jorge Chiarella Krüger, 77, theater director and actor.
- 3 April – Elidio Espinoza, 65, politician, mayor of Trujillo (2015–2018), COVID-19.

=== September ===
- 11 September - Abimael Guzmán, leader of the Shining Path.

=== October ===
- 25 October - Fernando Herrera Mamani, Peruvian politician.

=== November ===
- 26 November - Óscar Catacora, Peruvian film director and screenwriter.

=== December ===
- 1 December – Raimundo Revoredo Ruiz, Peruvian prelate of the Roman Catholic Territorial Prelature of Juli (1988–1999)

== See also ==
- History of Peru
- COVID-19 pandemic in South America
- Asia-Pacific Economic Cooperation
