= 2027 in Peru =

- Decades: 2000s; 2010s; 2020s
- See also: Other events of 2027; Timeline of Peruvian history

Events in the year 2027 in Peru.

== Events ==
=== Scheduled ===
- 23 July–8 August – 2027 Pan American Games
- 22 August–1 September – 2027 Parapan American Games

== Art and entertainment ==
- List of Peruvian submissions for the Academy Award for Best International Feature Film

== Holidays ==
- 1 January – New Year's Day
- 25 March – Maundy Thursday
- 26 March – Good Friday
- 1 May – Labour Day
- 7 June – Flag Day
- 29 June – Feast of Saints Peter and Paul
- 28–29 July – Independence Day
- 30 August – Santa Rosa de Lima
- 8 October – Battle of Angamos
- 1 November – All Saints' Day
- 8 December – Immaculate Conception
- 9 December – Battle of Ayacucho
- 25 December – Christmas Day
