= The Knife of Don Juan =

- Theatrical release poster
- Directed by: Tom Sanchez
- Written by: Tom Sanchez
- Produced by: Julie Sifuentes Etheridge; Tom Sanchez; Conan Simmons; Benjamin Wilkins
- Starring: JC Montoya; Rodrigo Viaggio
- Cinematography: Nicola Marsh
- Edited by: Manuel Reveles
- Music by: Chanda Dancy
- Production company: 1405 Comunicaciones
- Distributed by: Star Films
- Release dates: November 2013 (Texas); September 24, 2015 (Peru)
- Running time: 110 minutes
- Countries: Peru; United States
- Language: Spanish

The Knife of Don Juan or The Blade of Don Juan (Spanish: La navaja de Don Juan) is a 2013 comedy-drama film written, directed and co-produced by Tom Sanchez in his directorial debut. The film stars JC Montoya and Rodrigo Viaggio.

== Synopsis ==
The relationship of two brothers will be defined by a game of forces and a party where the youngest of them hopes to lose his virginity. But as events unfold, the boys must overcome rivalries that, after a fight, suddenly send things spiraling out of control.

== Cast ==
The actors participating in this film are:

- JC Montoya as Walter Alfaro
- Rodrigo Viaggio as Mario Alfaro
- Irma Maury as Grandma
- Antonio Arrué as Uncle umberto
- Viviana Andrade as Jenni Alfaro
- Jorge Gutiérrez as Crazy Face
- Nataniel Sánchez as Ana
- Fernando Petong as Juan Carlos Alfaro
- Jimena Venturo as Vanesa
- Deyssi Pelaez as Carmen Rosa
- Sebastian Rubio as Guillermo
- Jaime Calle as Upset Player

== Production ==
=== Financing ===
In 2012, it won the Post-Production Feature Film Project Contest where he received S/.210,000 to complete the post-production stage.

=== Filming ===
The film was recorded in different locations in Lima such as Rímac and Quinta Heeren in Barrios Altos.

== Release ==
The film initially premiered in November 2013 at the Austin, Texas Film Festival. The film was commercially released on September 24, 2015, in Peruvian theaters.

== Reception ==
The film managed to attract 4,224 viewers throughout its run in theaters.
