= 2025 Ollantaytambo District train collision =

Train collision in Peru

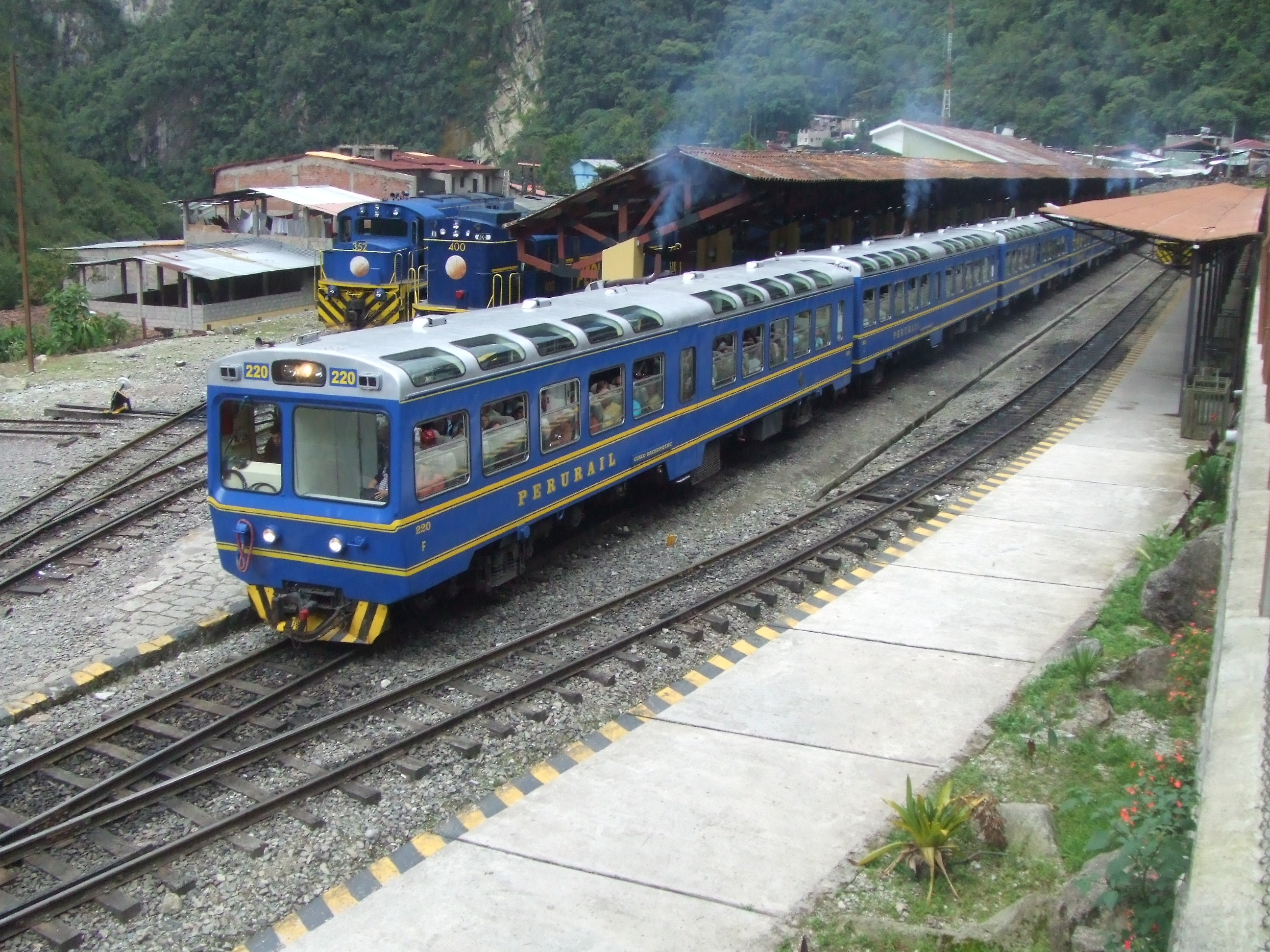
- PeruRail train 220, one of the trains involved in the accident, pictured in 2007

Details
- Date: December 30, 2025; 1:20 p.m. PET
- Location: Ollantaytambo District, Department of Cusco
- Country: Peru
- Line: Machu Picchu-Cusco line
- Operator: PeruRail, Inca Rail
- Incident type: Collision
- Cause: Under investigation

Statistics
- Trains: 2 passenger trains: Inca Rail train 954; PeruRail train 220
- Deaths: 1
- Injured: 40

On December 30, 2025, two passenger trains travelling in opposite directions collided near Machu Picchu in Ollantaytambo District, Department of Cusco, Peru, killing one person and injuring 40 others.

== Background ==
The Southern Railway is the main rail connection in the Department of Cusco, used primarily to reach the Inca fortress of Machu Picchu, within the historic sanctuary of the same name. Machu Picchu attracts about 1.5 million visitors per year, mostly arriving by train to the nearby town of Aguas Calientes. The site tends to experience a greater influx of visitors during the Christmas and holiday season.

== Accident ==
PeruRail and Inca Rail were the companies managing the two trains involved in the incident. The collision occurred at 1:20 p.m. PET near Corihuayrachina, a considerable distance from Ollantaytambo and Cusco. Videos from the scene showed injured victims lying next to the tracks with the damaged trains nearby. Once the collision occurred, personnel notified the park rangers of the Historical Sanctuary and the National Police of Peru. A dozen ambulances and medical personnel were rushed to the site in a remote Andean area without direct road access.

== Aftermath ==
The railway suspended services along the rail line.

== Victims ==
Peruvian authorities began transferring the victims to medical centers in Cusco. It was initially reported that there was 15 injuries, but the number of casualties was later increased to 41, including a fatality. A health official said 20 people were in relatively serious condition. The deceased victim was identified as Roberto Cárdenas Loay, the conductor of the Inca Rail train. The majority of the victims were tourists from the United States. Two Japanese, four Chinese and seven Canadian nationals were also among the injured.

== Investigation ==
Peru Rail said they were investigating the cause. INDECOPI stated that it will initiate investigations into the two railway companies involved.

== Reactions ==
The Embassy of the United States, Lima said it was in communication with the U.S. nationals and was assisting with their transportation.
