= 2024 in Peru =

- Decades: 2000s; 2010s; 2020s
- See also: Other events of 2024; Timeline of Peruvian history

Events in the year 2024 in Peru.

== Incumbents ==
- President:
  - Dina Boluarte
- Prime Minister:
  - Alberto Otárola (until 5 March)
  - Gustavo Adrianzén (since 6 March)

== Events ==
=== March ===
- 5 March – Prime Minister Alberto Otárola resigns after recordings of an alleged conversations with a former lover are released by the media appearing to show Otárola granting government contracts to her.
- 30 March – Authorities raid President Dina Boluarte's residence in Surquillo, Lima as part of an investigation into allegations over her failure to declare luxury watches in her assets in what later becomes known as the Rolexgate case.

=== April ===
- 22 April – Psychologist and polymyositis patient Ana Estrada becomes the first person in the country to die from legally-assisted suicide following a successful eight-year legal battle.
- 28 April – A bus plunges into a river in Cajamarca Department, killing 25 people and injuring 13.

=== May ===
- 10 May – The Health Ministry officially classifies transsexualism as a mental disorder, sparking protests from LGBT advocates.
- 11 May – Authorities launch an investigation into President Boluarte for disbanding a police force that was investigating her brother Nicanor Boluarte, who was arrested for alleged influence peddling.
- 17 May – A vacancy motion is filed in Congress against President Boluarte, citing “moral incapacity” in the wake of investigations into the Rolexgate case and the arrest of her brother Nicanor.
- 26 May – Four people are killed and 30 others are injured in a level-crossing collision between a bus and a freight train in La Oroya.

=== June ===
- 19 June – Two soldiers are convicted of raping nine teenagers in Manta District, Huancavelica Department from 1984 to 1994 during the Peruvian conflict and sentenced to between six and 12 years' imprisonment.
- 25 June – The Ministry of Health announces that it will stop labeling transgender individuals as suffering from mental disorders, but will instead use the term "gender discordance".
- 28 June – A magnitude 7.2 earthquake strikes off the coast of the Department of Arequipa.

=== July ===
- 4 July – The Peruvian Congress votes 15–12 to pass a bill introducing a statute of limitations on prosecuting crimes against humanity committed before July 2002. The measure formally becomes law on 9 August.
- 16 July – At least 23 people are killed and 13 others are injured when a bus veers off a cliff and crashes on a highway in the Ayacucho region in the Andes Mountains.

=== August ===
- 7 August – Stefano Peschiera wins a bronze medal representing Peru at the 2024 Summer Olympics in sailing, Peru's first Olympic medal in 32 years.
- 14 August:
  - Luis Fernando Figari, the founder of the Catholic organisation Sodalitium Christianae Vitae, is expelled from the movement by Pope Francis following an investigation into allegations of sexual and psychological abuse and corruption.
  - Gianfranco Torres-Navarro, the leader of the Los Killers de Ventanilla y Callao criminal gang accused of 23 murders in the Callao area, is arrested by US authorities in New York.
- 26–31 August – 2024 World Athletics U20 Championships at Lima

=== September ===
- 3 September – A clash between the isolated indigenous Mashco-Piro community and loggers attempting to clear a forest path near their territory in Madre de Dios Department results in the deaths of two loggers, with two more missing.
- 11 September – Former president Alberto Fujimori dies from tongue cancer in Lima at the age of 86.
- 18 September – President Dina Boluarte issues a state of emergency for the departments of Amazonas, San Martín, and Ucayali, which have been significantly impacted by wildfires that have killed at least sixteen people.
- 21 September – 2024 Peru wildfires: Wildfires reach at least seven archaeological sites and near the indigenous Shipibo-Conibo community.

=== October ===
- 21 October – Former president Alejandro Toledo is sentenced to 20 years' imprisonment by the National Superior Court of Specialized Criminal Justice for taking bribes as part of the Odebrecht case.

=== November ===
- 7 November – Agustín Lozano, the president of the Peruvian Football Federation, is arrested in Lima on charges that include fraud, extortion and money laundering.
- 14 November – The Chancay Mega-port, the first Chinese-funded port in the country, is inaugurated.
- 15–16 November – The APEC Peru 2024 summit is held in Lima.
- 23 November – A bus accident in Moyobamba, San Martin, during a high school graduation trip left 12 dead and 33 injured.

=== December ===
- 25 December – An "environmental emergency" is declared in Talara province following an oil spill originating from a Petroperú vessel.

== Art and entertainment ==
- List of Peruvian submissions for the Academy Award for Best International Feature Film

== Holidays ==
- 1 January – New Year's Day
- 28 March – Maundy Thursday
- 29 March – Good Friday
- 1 May – Labour Day
- 7 June – Flag Day
- 29 June – Feast of Saints Peter and Paul
- 28–29 July – Independence Day
- 30 August – Santa Rosa de Lima
- 8 October – Battle of Angamos
- 1 November – All Saints' Day
- 8 December – Immaculate Conception
- 9 December – Battle of Ayacucho
- 25 December – Christmas Day

== Deaths ==
- 8 January – Gonzalo García Núñez, 76, economist and politician, Lima City councilman (1984–1989) and director of BCRP (2001–2006).
- 11 January – Roberto Abugattás, 80, Olympic high jumper (1964, 1968).
- 29 January – Fernando Acevedo, 77, Olympic sprinter (1968, 1972).
- 10 July – Carlos Manrique, 88, businessman and convicted criminal.
- 11 August – Carlos Germán Belli, 96, poet.
- 11 September – Alberto Fujimori, 86, President (1990-2000) and convicted criminal, tongue cancer.
- 4 October – Lourdes Mendoza del Solar, 66, Second Vice President (2006-2011), heart attack.
- 22 October – Gustavo Gutiérrez, Catholic priest and proponent of liberation theology.
