= Fiestas Patrias =

Fiestas Patrias is a Spanish phrase meaning "Patriotic Holidays" or "National Holidays". It may refer to:

- Fiestas Patrias (Mexico), a set of Mexican holidays
- Fiestas Patrias (Chile), the Independence Day celebration of Chile
- Fiestas Patrias (Panama), a series of holidays in Panama (see Public holidays in Panama)
- Fiestas Patrias (Peru), the national independence holidays of Peru
- Dias Patrios (Guatemala), the national independence holidays of Guatemala
