= Jorge Benavides =

Peruvian humorist (born 1967)

- Born: Jorge Luis Luren Benavides Gastello; April 9, 1967 (age 59); Lima, Peru
- Other name: JB
- Occupations: Humorist, actor, impressionist, screenwriter, producer, director
- Years active: 1985–present

Jorge Luis Luren Benavides Gastello (born April 9, 1967), also known as JB, is a Peruvian humorist, actor, impressionist, producer, and director who has been working on comedy programs in his country since the 1980s. His career began on Trampolín a la fama as a guest, then on Risas y salsa. He rose to prominence again in the 1990s with comedy programs he created himself: JB noticias, La paisana Jacinta, El especial del humor (originally Los inimitables), JB en Willax, El wasap de JB, and JB en ATV.

== Career ==
In 1984, Jorge became acquainted with television sets, appearing in four programs in the late 1980s on América Televisión: El Enchufe, JB, el imitador, El barrio en movimiento, and the legendary show hosted by presenter Yola Polastri, Hola Yola. Three years later, in 1987, he met fellow comedian and actor Carlos Vílchez, and by 1994 they launched this comedy program under the name JB noticias, which had a long and successful run on Frecuencia Latina with part of the cast from their previous shows. Despite the initial success of JB Noticias due to the popularity of the cast, sketches, and characters created by Benavides—such as La paisana Jacinta—the program ended in 2001 due to low ratings. However, the sketch La paisana Jacinta became an independent show.

La paisana Jacinta ended in 2002. Benavides and his friend, comedian Carlos Álvarez, joined forces and, in 2004, created the character imitation and parody program El especial del humor, featuring nationally and internationally famous figures. The following year, new episodes were recorded for a second season of La paisana Jacinta, with the word paisana (hillbilly) removed from the show's title. However, after allegations of racism, the season's premiere was canceled. Carlos Álvarez left El especial del humor in 2011, and many other actors who had previously worked with Benavides joined the program, such as Carlos Vílchez, Enrique Espejo, Lucecita Ceballos, Manolo Rojas, Felpudini, and his brother Alfredo Benavides. The show continued to air until 2014.

After a brief period on Willax Televisión with the program JB en Willax, in 2016 the show El wasap de JB premiered on Latina Televisión, running until 2020. In 2021, the program JB en ATV premiered on ATV, which lasted until 2025.

== Personal life ==
Jorge is the son of Alfredo Benavides Prado and Cecilia Gastello. He has four siblings: Patricia, Carlos, Alfredo, and Christian. Alfredo is also a comedian and performed on Risas y salsa, while Christian had appearances in JB noticias, La paisana Jacinta, and El especial del humor, as well as serving as a producer for the latter until 2009. Jorge was married to Colombian vedette Athala Meza, with whom he had a daughter, Sol Isis Jahaira (born 1993). He remarried on April 24, 2009, this time to dancer and co-producer of El wasap de JB, Karin Marengo Núñez, his current partner, with whom he has two children.

== Filmography ==
=== Television ===
Title	Period	Channel
Hola Yola	1980-1984	América Televisión
El barrio del movimiento	1984-1985	América Televisión
Risas y salsa	1986-1990	Panamericana Televisión
JB el imitador	1990-1993	ATV
El enchufe	1993-1994	América Televisión
JB Noticias	1994-2001	Frecuencia Latina
La paisana Jacinta	1999-2002	Frecuencia Latina
Carnecitas	1999	Frecuencia Latina
Risas Latinas	2000-2004	Frecuencia Latina
Los cuentos de la paisana Jacinta	2002	Frecuencia Latina
Los inimitables	2004	Frecuencia Latina
El especial del humor	2004-2014	Frecuencia Latina
Jacinta	2005	Frecuencia Latina
Lo mejor del especial del humor	2010-2011	Frecuencia Latina
La paisana Jacinta	2014-2015	Frecuencia Latina
JB en Willax	2016-2017	Willax Televisión
KG de risa	2016-2017	Willax Televisión
El wasap de JB	2017-2021	Latina Televisión
La máscara	2020	Latina Televisión
JB en ATV	2021-2025	ATV

=== Cinema ===
Title	Year	Role
La paisana Jacinta en búsqueda de Wasaberto	2017	La paisana Jacinta
