= 2024 Lobitos oil spill =

Environmental disaster in Peru

- Interactive map of 2024 Lobitos oil spill
- Location: Lobitos District, Talara, Piura, Peru

Cause
- Cause: Under investigation

Spill characteristics
- Area: 10,000 square meters
- Shoreline impacted: 10 km

The Lobitos oil spill occurred on December 21, 2024, during pre-shipment maneuvers for oil on the Polyaigos vessel at the Talara Refinery underwater terminal, managed by Petroperú in the district of Lobitos, located in the province of Talara in Piura, Peru. The presence of hydrocarbons was detected during certification for loading procedures. The event affected five beaches in the district of Lobitos and caused serious damage to the marine-coastal ecosystem, affecting biodiversity and generating significant economic and social impacts.

== Context ==
On December 20, 2024, Petroperú began operations at the Punta Arenas Multiboyas Terminal during the afternoon, with the aim of loading petroleum onto a vessel at the Talara Refinery's underwater terminal. However, while waiting for certification to begin loading at night, a spill of unknown origin was reported, prompting the company to activate its contingency plan and begin an investigation. As a result, at least 10,000 square meters of sea and a 10-kilometer stretch of the coastline were contaminated, affecting beaches such as Las Capullanas, El Anchón, Las Dos Piernas, Yapato, and La Bola, important tourist destinations in the region.

== Environmental impact ==
The oil spill affected various marine species such as turtles, dolphins, crabs, octopuses, and fish, with olive ridley sea turtles, classified as vulnerable, especially susceptible to mortality from contact with hydrocarbons. Veterinarians and biologists from the National Forest and Wildlife Service (SERFOR) worked to rescue and rehabilitate the affected animals. In addition, local fishermen reported the deaths of dolphins and other marine species, while images on social media showed the oil affecting critical areas such as turtle nesting areas and benthic ecosystems. The contamination also reached rocky areas where barnacles grow, referred to as an important species for maintaining the local ecosystem's balance. The District Municipality of Lobitos confirmed that crabs, octopuses and other species were also affected.

== Response ==
Petroperú reported that it had controlled the situation and implemented clean-up protocols, but the mayor of Lobitos, Ricardo Bancayán, accused the company of minimizing the impact of the spill. In response, the Lobitos District Municipality, the Environmental Assessment and Oversight Agency (OEFA), the National Service of Natural Protected Areas by the State (SERNANP), and the Specialized Prosecutor's Office for Environmental Matters (INDECI) began investigations to determine responsibility. Representatives of the National Institute of Civil Defence (INDECI), local authorities, and other institutions visited Las Capullanas beach, where they confirmed the environmental and social impact. INDECI suggested that the municipality prepare an official registry of affected people to coordinate response actions, and a meeting was held at the Lobitos Municipality to identify the needs of the population and improve inter-institutional coordination.

=== Rehabilitation ===
SERFOR, in coordination with local and national institutions, applied protocols for managing wildlife in the event of oil spills in coastal marine environments.

== Economic and social consequences ==
The spill had a negative impact on tourism and fishing, the main economic activities of the region. The affected beaches, such as Las Capullanas and La Bola, are key destinations for tourism in northern Peru. Local communities, dependent on the sea for their livelihood, faced serious difficulties due to the contamination.

== See also ==
- 2022 Callao oil spill
