= 2022 in Peru =

- Decades: 2000s; 2010s; 2020s
- See also: Other events of 2022; Timeline of Peruvian history

Events in the year 2022 in Peru.

== Incumbents ==
- President:
  - Pedro Castillo (until 7 December)
  - Dina Boluarte (from 7 December)
- Prime Minister:
  - Mirtha Vásquez (until 1 February)
  - Héctor Valer (1 February - 8 February)
  - Aníbal Torres (8 February - 26 November)
  - Betssy Chávez (26 November - 7 December)
  - Pedro Angulo Arana (11 December - 21 December)
  - Alberto Otárola (from 21 December)

== Events ==
- 2 March – Peru voted on a United Nations resolution condemning Russia for its invasion of Ukraine.
- 29 March – The protests occur due to COVID-19 and the 2022 Russian invasion of Ukraine.
- 4 August – Prime minister Aníbal Torres, resigns during multiple criminal investigations against President Pedro Castillo, however Castillo rejected his resignation.
- 5 October – One person is killed and 2 others are injured by a magnitude 5.8 earthquake in Piura.
- 18 November – LATAM Perú Flight 2213
- 26 November – Prime minister Aníbal Torres, resigns again, and was replaced by Betssy Chávez
- 7 December – 2022 Peruvian self-coup attempt:
  - Peruvian President Pedro Castillo announces the dissolution of the Congress of the Republic, the imposition of a curfew, the creation of an "emergency" government and early parliamentary election hours before his third impeachment attempt. He is arrested shortly after he leaves the Government Palace.
  - Prime Minister Betssy Chávez announces her resignation.
  - Peruvian First Vice President Dina Boluarte sworn in as president after Castillo's arrest.
  - Protests erupt across Peru following the ousting of President Pedro Castillo. Dozens are injured and many are taken hostages during the commotion.
- 14 December - President Boluarte declares 30-day of state emergency and deploys military throughout Peru following violent protests.
- 15 December - The army opens fire at protestors in Ayacucho, killing 9 and injuring 55.
- 16 December - Peruvian Minister of Education Patricia Correa and Culture Minister Jair Pérez resign from their position due to rising casualties in the protests.

== Sport ==
- Peru at the 2022 Winter Olympics

== Deaths ==
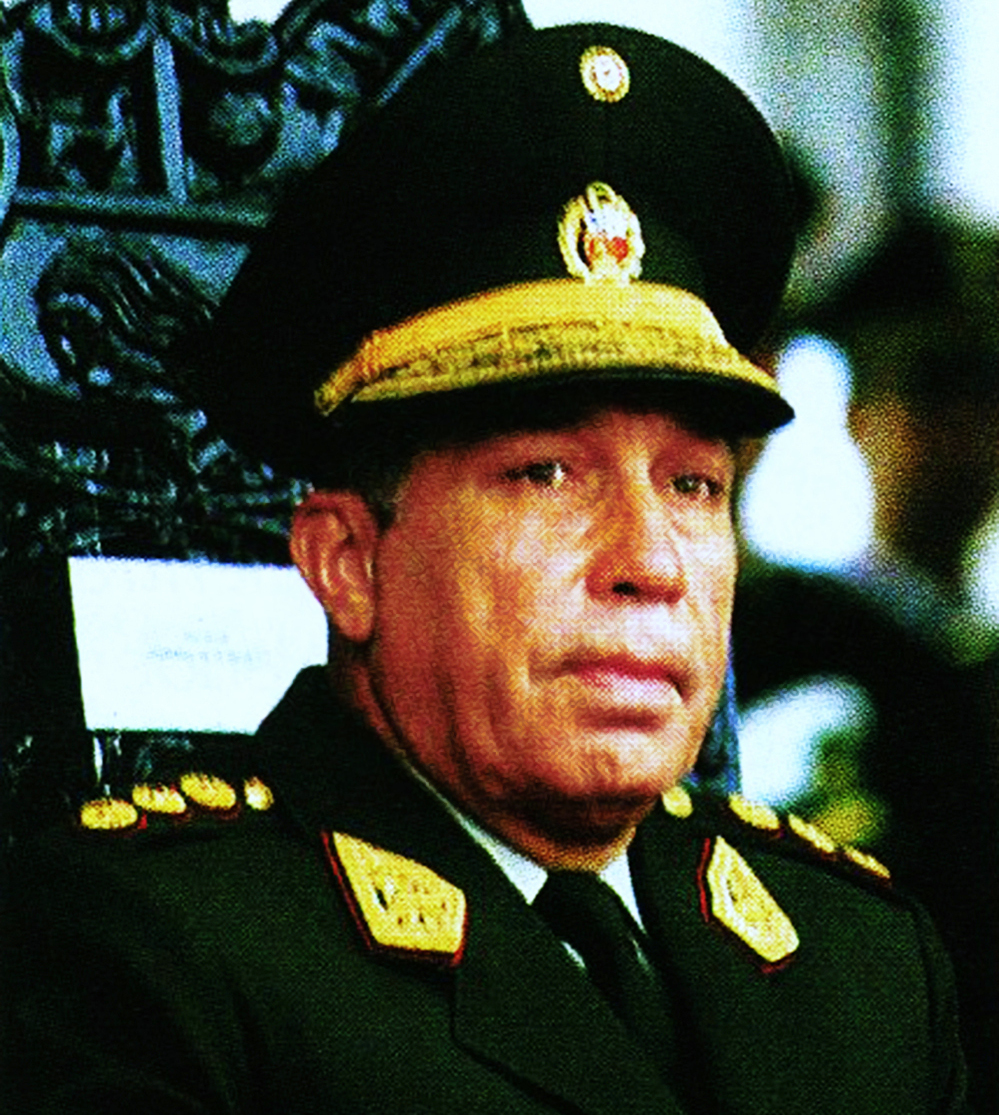
Francisco Morales-Bermúdez

- 12 January – Luis Castañeda, politician (born 1945).
- 21 May - Heddy Honigmann, documentary filmmaker (born 1951)
- 14 July - Francisco Morales-Bermúdez, 112th Prime Minister and 51st President of Peru (born 1921)
- 4 August - Diego Bertie, musician and actor (born 1967)
- 8 December - Martha Hildebrandt, linguist and politician (born 1925)
