= Yuca (comedian) =

Peruvian actor (1951–2026)

- Born: Enrique Eduardo Espejo Peña; 22 April 1951; Barranca, Peru
- Died: 11 September 2026 (aged 75); Lima, Peru
- Occupations: Actor; comedian
- Years active: 1980–2025

Enrique Eduardo Espejo Peña (22 April 1951 – 11 September 2026), known by the pseudonym Yuca, was a Peruvian actor and comedian. He is known for his appearance in a show Risas y salsa with Jorge Benavides.

== Early life and career ==
Enrique Eduardo Espejo Peña was born in Barranca, Peru on 22 April 1951. When he was 15 years old, he moved to Lima to study. He worked as the head of savings at the Banco Hipotecario del Perú for a decade.

Espejo started his acting career in 1980 after comedian Tulio Loza invited him to appear as an extra on his program. Later that year, he joined the cast of the iconic sketch comedy show Risas y salsa. During the bloopers, Adolfo Chuiman gave him the nickname "Yuca" while teasing Espejo on camera. In 1987, he gained popularity on Risas y salsa through a sketch segment showing chaotic interactions between a public bus collector and his passengers.

In 1994, Espejo then became friends with another comedian called Jorge Benavides. He joined Jorge's television show in JB el imitador and JB Noticias. He served as the comedian for popular sketches, such as "Rambo", in which he played the long-suffering sidekick to Benavides' action-hero parody and "La jugada polémica", in which he was repeatedly injured while re-enacting controversial football plays.

Throughout his career from 1980 to 2025, he got a role in Jorge's show such as La paisana Jacinta, El especial del humor, JB en Willax, El wasap de JB, and JB en ATV. In 2013, he retired from live theater performances in order to focus on his work in broadcast television. He made appearances in the comedy sequel ¡Asu mare! 2 and La paisana Jacinta en búsqueda de Wasaberto.

== Personal life and death ==
In 2015, Espejo was injured in a bomb attack at the La Paisana Jacinta circus tent in San Juan de Lurigancho. In 2019, he was accused of inappropriate touching by actress Clara Seminara. In May 2023, the Judiciary issued a first-instance sentence imposing a three-year suspended prison term. In March 2025, he suffered a fall in the Lince district that resulted in a skull fracture, leading to his definitive retirement from television. The following year, Clara Seminara stated that she had decided to withdraw the complaint against the comedian for "humanitarian reasons".

On 11 September 2026, Espejo died in Lima, at the age of 75.
