= 2023 Yanaquihua gold mine fire =

Fire in Peru

- Condesuyos Province, where the fire broke out
- Date: 6 May 2023
- Location: Yanaquihua District, Condesuyos Province, Peru; 15°53′29.79″S 73°40′6.74″W
- Type: Fire
- Cause: Short circuit
- Deaths: 27

On 6 May 2023, a fire broke out in the La Esperanza gold mine in Yanaquihua District, Condesuyos Province, Peru leaving at least 27 dead. The fire was the country's deadliest mining accident since 2000.

== Background ==
Fatal mining accidents are not uncommon in Peru, which is the world's largest gold producer—more than 100 tonnes of gold are mined per year in Peru, which is about 4% of the world's annual supply—and the world's second-largest source of silver, copper and zinc. However, most fatalities are usually spread out in smaller incidents. In 2022, 38 or 39 people were killed in mining accidents in Peru. Peru's deadliest year in mining accidents was 2002, when there were 73 fatalities. The mine where the fire happened is operated by Minera Yanaquihua, which has been operating mines in Peru for 23 years. The dead miners worked for a contractor.

== Fire ==
The reason for the fire was a short circuit that caused a fire to spread within the tunnel in the gold mine. The fire led to an explosion that ignited the wooden supports, many of which were soaked in oil, inside the mine. It happened during an overnight shift. At least 27 people died. It is believed that most of the miners died due to asphyxiation and burns. Images on social media and in local showed plumes of smoke pouring out of the mine. News of the fire was only published on Sunday once police had gathered information about the victims. The regional government said that the emergency response had been complicated because the closest police station was about 90 minutes away from the mine and several hours from the closest city. It was believed that miners were working at least 80 to 100 metres (260 to 330 feet) below the surface when the fire started. Early on, it was reported that two miners were rescued. Later, it was reported that 175 miners were rescued. Thirty specialist officers went to the area to secure the mine before they began recovery efforts. According to La República, relatives of the missing miners arrived at the scene on the morning of 7 May, but were denied access to the site. All 27 bodies were recovered by the National Police by 1 am on 8 May. The bodies were taken to the morgue in Arequipa.
