= Ernesto Ráez Mendiola =

Peruvian actor (1936–2021)

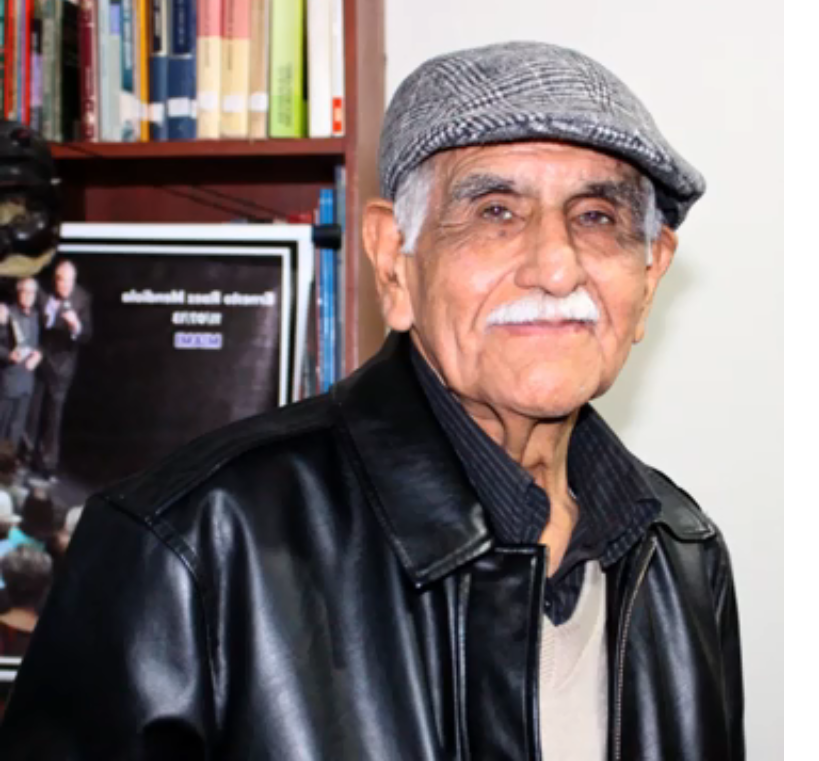
- Born: 20 May 1936; Rímac, Peru
- Died: 11th March 2021 (84 years)
- Occupation(s): Director, Writer and Teacher
- Employer: National University of San Marcos Pontifical Catholic University of Peru Ricardo Palma University National High School of Dramatic Arts
- Children: Rafo Ráez
- Awards: Personalidad Meritoria de la Cultura (2014)

Ernesto Ráez Mendiola (20 May 1936 – 11 March 2021) was a Peruvian stage director, actor, and theater teacher. He worked in several universities in Peru, teaching theatre and in 2014 he was awarded the Personalidad Meritoria de la Cultura award.
