= Susy Aponte =

Peruvian journalist and politician (1982–2026)

Susy Aponte Polo
- Born: Susy Ysabel Aponte Polo de Tello; 18 November 1982; Lima, Peru
- Died: 19 September 2026 (aged 43); Caraz, Huaylas, Peru
- Cause of death: Assassination by gunshot
- Other name: La China Polo
- Occupations: Journalist and politician
- Known for: Hosting China Polo Dominical
- Political party: Socios por Áncash

Susy Ysabel Aponte Polo de Tello (18 November 1982 – 19 September 2026) was a Peruvian journalist and politician. She was publicly known as La China Polo for hosting the digital program China Polo Dominical. In 2026, she ran for Regional Governor of Áncash with the regional movement Socios por Áncash.

On 19 September 2026, she was shot dead while at a campaign event in the city of Caraz amidst the Peruvian security crisis.

== Career ==
=== Journalism ===
Aponte Polo primarily carried out her journalistic work through digital media. She hosted the program China Polo Dominical, through which she broadcast reports and exposés. Among the topics covered by her program were alleged cases of corruption, organized crime, illegal mining, public works, local and regional authorities, as well as questions about institutions and public figures.

=== Tax investigations ===
In 2021, the prosecutor's office opened an investigation against her and regional governor Henry Borja for the alleged crime of money laundering. The complainant also accused Aponte of having allegedly influenced the regional governor to appoint Luis Meléndez Cuentas as director of the Huaylas Norte Health Network and Rony Meléndez Cuentas as deputy director of transportation in Chimbote.

In 2023, she was included in a tax investigation for allegedly being part of a network dedicated to selling professional communications services to authorities in exchange for obtaining state resources and not investigating them. An audio recording was released in which Aponte spoke with Felipe Mantilla, a provincial councilman from Santa-Chimbote, coordinating to remove Luis Gamarra Alor, the provincial mayor of Santa-Chimbote, from office. The Attorney General's Office reported that this alleged network intended to take control of the Regional Government of Áncash and the Provincial Municipality of Santa-Chimbote.

In 2025, the Specialized Prosecutor's Office for Corruption of Public Officials in Áncash requested 18 months of pretrial detention against her for allegedly leading the criminal organization "Los Elegantes de Áncash" (The Elegant Ones of Áncash), a suspected network of officials who, between 2020 and 2023, operated within the Regional Directorate of Transportation and Communications of Áncash, demanding illicit payments to approve various procedures, with a portion of the money going to her personally. It was indicated that driving schools and medical examiners also operated within this network, issuing favorable certificates. Additionally, the creation of an association called Vehículos Autorizados Villón Huaraz (Authorized Vehicles Villón Huaraz) was detected; this association, listed as nonexistent in official records, allegedly served to centralize vehicle control and collect fees for evaluations. In 2026, the prosecution requested a 12-year and 8-month prison sentence against her for the crimes of criminal gang and passive bribery, and a 25-year disqualification in the context of the "Los Elegantes de Áncash" case.

== Political career ==
Aponte was registered as a candidate for the Chamber of Deputies for the Áncash constituency for the 2026 general election, as a member of the political organization Un Camino Diferente; however, the Special Electoral Jury of Huaraz ordered her exclusion from the party list in February 2026 due to the omission of two final convictions in her sworn statement of resume.

According to the resolution of the Huaraz Special Electoral Tribunal (JEE), the convictions included a 2015 sentence for falsifying official documents, with a three-year suspended prison sentence, and a 2017 sentence for document forgery, with a three-year suspended prison sentence. The resolution states that the political organization maintained during the proceedings that both convictions had been recorded in a physical declaration, but that they were not entered into the official computer system. The electoral body considered that the information ultimately registered in the sworn statement did not comply with the requirements established by electoral regulations and ordered its exclusion.

In the regional and municipal elections scheduled for 4 October 2026, Aponte Polo was a candidate for Regional Governor of Áncash for the regional movement Socios por Áncash. During the campaign, she participated in campaign activities and in the debate organized by the National Jury of Elections on 15 September.

== Assassination ==
In the days leading up to her death, Aponte Polo posted messages on social media claiming to have received death threats. According to her own statements, she had received calls originating from prisons and had been the victim of harassment and intimidation. These claims were made public before the attack, but the circumstances and motive behind the threats are part of the authorities' investigation.

On 19 September 2026, while Aponte Polo was campaigning near a market in Caraz, in the province of Huaylas, a man shot her in the head, killing her. Five other people were also injured and transported to the regional hospital. The assassination was captured on video by a civilian standing in front of her.

Following the attack, the National Police of Peru reported the arrest of a Venezuelan national, preliminarily identified as a suspect, and the seizure of a firearm. The Public Ministry of Peru, through the Specialized Prosecutor's Office for Violence Against Women and Family Members of Huaylas, initiated a preliminary investigation for the alleged crime of femicide and ordered various investigative steps, including the collection of security camera footage and other evidence related to the attack. Subsequently, the charge was changed to contract killing because the Specialized Prosecutor's Office for Violence Against Women had initially intervened and due to the evidence gathered. Attorney General Tomás Gálvez reported that, along with the Venezuelan national, two other people were arrested: one who allegedly financed the attack and another who allegedly transported the hitman.
