= Oscar Medelius =

Peruvian politician (1955–2025)

Member of Congress
- In office 26 July 1995 – 26 July 2000
- Constituency: National

Personal details
- Born: 3 September 1955 Peru
- Died: 10 February 2025 (aged 69) Carabayllo, Lima, Peru
- Cause of death: Assassination by gunshot
- Party: Cambio 90-New Majority
- Other political affiliations: Peru 2000
- Occupation: Lawyer
- Profession: Politician

Oscar Eliseo Medelius Rodríguez (3 September 1955 – 10 February 2025) was a Peruvian Fujimorist politician.

== Political career ==
He served as a member of the Congress of the Republic of Peru. An attorney by trade, Medelius was elected to Peruvian Congress on the Fujimorist Cambio 90-New Majority ticket.

Medelius was allegedly involved in a scandal in which the National Intelligence Service forged signatures to get the Peru 2000 political party on the ballot. On 7 February 2006, Medelius was arrested in the United States. In 2001, violating the Peruvian Constitution, the Peruvian Criminal Procedure Code, treaties and human rights covenant, the Peruvian authorities reopened a criminal docket closed definitely since October 2000. Oscar Medelius fled Peru to seek humanitarian protection in the United States. On 10 April 2008, the Attorney General of Peru announced that United States Secretary of State Condoleezza Rice authorized Medelius's extradition to Peru. On 18 April 2008, he arrived in Lima. On 16 June 2009, Medelius was declared not guilty and consequently removed from the process after the Supreme Court accepted the former Congressman's appeal submitted in November 2008. Medelius had recurred to such notice of appeal in response to a previous ruling which sentenced him to eight years in prison. After analyzing the corresponding evidence and basing the final verdict on other rulings pertaining to the case, the Supreme Court ordained Medelius' exclusion from the case in an official ruling released on 16 June 2009.

== Death ==
Medelius was assassinated by shooting in Carabayllo, Lima, on 10 February 2025, at the age of 69. The suspect was arrested by the National Police of Peru.
