= Compartamos Banco =

Mexican bank

Compartamos, S.A.B de C.V.
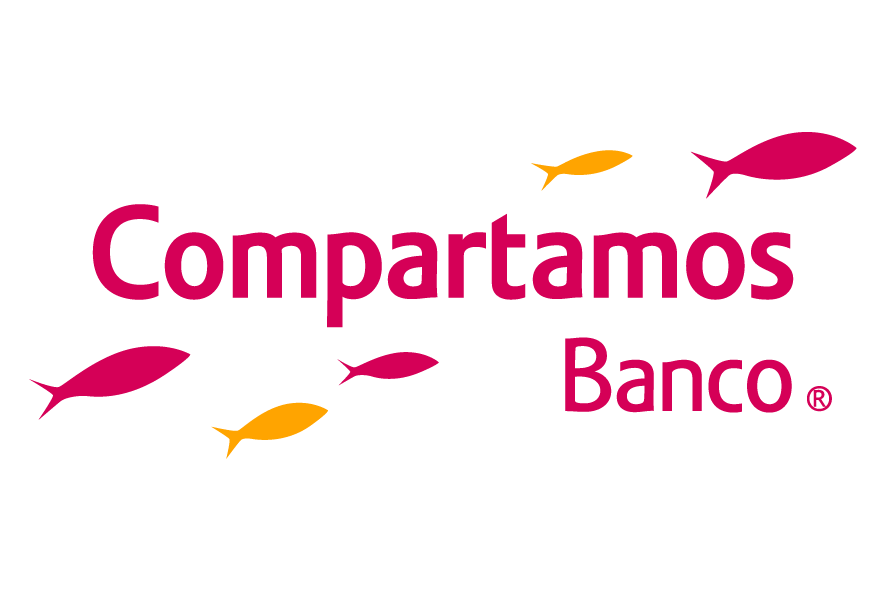
- Company type: Sociedad Anónima Bursátil de Capital Variable
- Traded as: BMV: GENTERA
- Industry: Banking
- Founded: 1990; 36 years ago
- Headquarters: Mexico City, Mexico
- Key people: Carlos Labarthe Costas, (Chairman); Enrique Majos Ramirez, (CEO)
- Products: Financial services
- Revenue: ▲US$ 33.5 million (2012)
- Net income: ▲US$ 154.2 million (2012)
- Total assets: ▲US$ 1.7 billion (2012)
- Number of employees: 15,000
- Parent: Gentera, S.A.B. de C.V.
- Website: www.compartamos.com

Compartamos Banco is a Mexican bank and the largest microfinance bank in Latin America, serving more than 2.5 million clients. The bank was founded in 1990 and is headquartered in Mexico City.

The bank is engaged in the credit and insurance sectors. In the Credit division, Compartamos offers a range of loans, including Woman Credit, Additional Credit, Home Improvement Credit, Solidarity Credit and Individual Credit, and in the Insurance division it provides Life Insurance and Integral Insurance. The company has 352 service offices in the Mexican domestic market.

== History ==
Founded by Jose Ignacio Avalos Hernandez as an NGO in 1990, Compartamos aimed to alleviate poverty by providing microcredit to small businesses, initially by offering loans to women at the base of the economic pyramid.

In order to grow the fund, it was decided to incorporate as a for-profit company in 2000, and a commercial banking license was obtained in 2006

In 2007 Compartamos controversially raised $467 million from the issue of an IPO, earning large returns for private investors as well as philanthropic backers such as ACCION International and the World Bank without raising any additional capital. In 2011, the group expanded operations to Guatemala and acquired Financiero Crear in Peru. Grupo Compartamos, the holding company, was renamed as Gentera in 2013.

== Products and services ==
- Crédito Mujer (Women Credit), a credit granted personally to women in groups from 12 to 50 members, with solidarity guarantee, for investment in their business.
- Crédito Comerciante (Merchant Credit), a group credit granted to groups of 5 to 8 entrepreneur men and/or women with solidarity guarantee.
- Crédito Crece Tu Negocio (Grow your Business Credit), which grants greater financing for men and/or women who need to make a stronger investment in their business, with a personal guarantee.
- Crédito Mejora tu Casa (Home Improvement Credit), granted to clients with a Crédito Mujer who need financing to build or improve their house.

== Criticisms ==
Compartamos attracted fierce criticisms in the wake of the IPO for enriching wealthy private investors with returns on equity of 53% generated from charging interest rates in excess of 100% from those in poverty.

Microfinance pioneer Muhammad Yunus described Compartamos's priorities as "screwed up" and suggested they should not be compared with the microcredit projects he had championed.

The Consultative Group to Assist the Poor, a World Bank affiliate that provided some of the early funding for Compartamos, argued that the IPO was the consequence of a justifiable earlier decision to take private investment to expand their capacity to offer loans, but expressed concern Compartamos may be placing shareholders' interests ahead of their clients.
