= Miguel Ángel Girollet =

- Born: 1947; Buenos Aires, Argentina
- Died: April 24, 1996; Madrid, Spain
- Instrument: Guitar

Miguel Ángel Girollet (1947–1996) was an Argentine classical guitar player whose repertoire included music from the 16th century to the contemporary era. In the 1970s, he formed part of the renowned Martínez Zárate String Quartet. He was born in Buenos Aires, Argentina, in 1947, and died in Madrid, Spain, in 1996.

== Training ==
Girollet studied at the Juan José Castro Conservatory in Buenos Aires with teachers Graciela Pomponio and Jorge Martínez Zárate. He later collaborated with his former professors as a member of the Martinez Zárate String Quartet after Eduardo Frasson retired. He continued to train privately from 1970 to 1972 with Abel Carlevaro and Ljerko Spiller.

== Performances ==
Girollet performed in concerts in Europe and the US. He appeared in venues like Teatro Colón in Buenos Aires, Carnegie Hall in New York, Hall of America of the OAS in Washington, Philharmonie in Berlin, Tchaikovsky Hall in Moscow, Philharmonic Halls in Leningrad, Kyiv and Armenia, Dvorák Hall in Prague; House of Radio France, and the Auditorio Nacional de Música in Madrid. He toured the former USSR; North, Central, and South America; and Germany. His repertoire covered music from the 16th century to contemporary.

=== The Americas ===
In Argentina, Girollet performed in the Jones Theatre, the Colón Theatre, the Cervantes National Theatre, and the President Alvear Theatre, as well as some theatres in smaller cities in the country. Girollet also performed in the National Symphony Orchestra on several occasions.

Girollet has visited almost every country in the Americas and performed with most national orchestras in South America, such as the Bogotá Philharmonic, the Symphony Orchestra of Ecuador, the Philharmonic Orchestra of Medellin, Colombia, and the National Chamber Orchestra of Montevideo, Uruguay.

=== Europe ===
Many of Girollet's professional activities were carried out in France, where he earned most of his rewards. He played in venues like the Maison de Radio France, in the Grand Théâtre de Bordeaux, and the Cortot Hall of the École Normale de Musique in Paris. He also participated in the Fourth International Festival of Paris. On several occasions, he visited Switzerland, Greece, England, Italy, Sweden, and Belgium. In 1986, he visited West Germany to participate in the Sixth Week of the Guitar in the city of Aschaffenburg, Bavaria.

Girollet also visited several countries in the then-Eastern Bloc. In East Germany, he presented in Magdeburg and in Berlin, where he performed as a soloist with the Symphonic Orchestra (Rundfunk-Sinfonieorchester Berlin) and dictated Masters classes. He also visited Poland, Armenia, Ukraine, Czechoslovakia (now the Czech Republic), and Bulgaria, where he performed again as a soloist in several orchestras. He visited the then-Soviet Union five times and played in Leningrad (today Saint Petersburg), including four times in the Great Hall of the Conservatory in Moscow.

== Teaching activities ==
Girollet was known not only as a performer but also for his teaching merits. He was a professor for 10 years in the Porto Alegre International Seminary and several Argentine conservatories, most notably in the Collegium Musicum of Buenos Aires. In his travels, he also taught at the Universities of Bordeaux, Puerto Rico, San Luis, Veracruz, Costa Rica, and Bogota. In Spain, he offered master classes at the Madrid Superior Royal Conservatory of Music, and during the International Music Encounter in Bièvres and the Bourges International Festival in France.

== Awards ==
- Musical Specials Competition (1970)
- Porto Alegre International Competition (1971)
- Geneva International Music Competition (1975)
- Radio France Competition in Paris (1975)
- International Competition in Paris (1975)
- Breyer Competition (1976)
- Konex Award (1989)
- Concurso Promociones Musicales de Buenos Aires (1970)
- Concurso Internacional de Porto Alegre (1971)
- International guitar competition in Geneva (1975)
- International Guitar Competition Paris (1975)
- Breyer competition (1976)

== Discography ==
Girollet only recorded one CD despite his public and critical recognition and many worldwide tours.

- Música Baroca Guitarra, Migual Ángel Girollet (Künstler), Various (Komponist), Opera Tres, 1995 - (Baroque Guitar Music).
