= Pedro Novoa =

Peruvian writer (1974–2021)

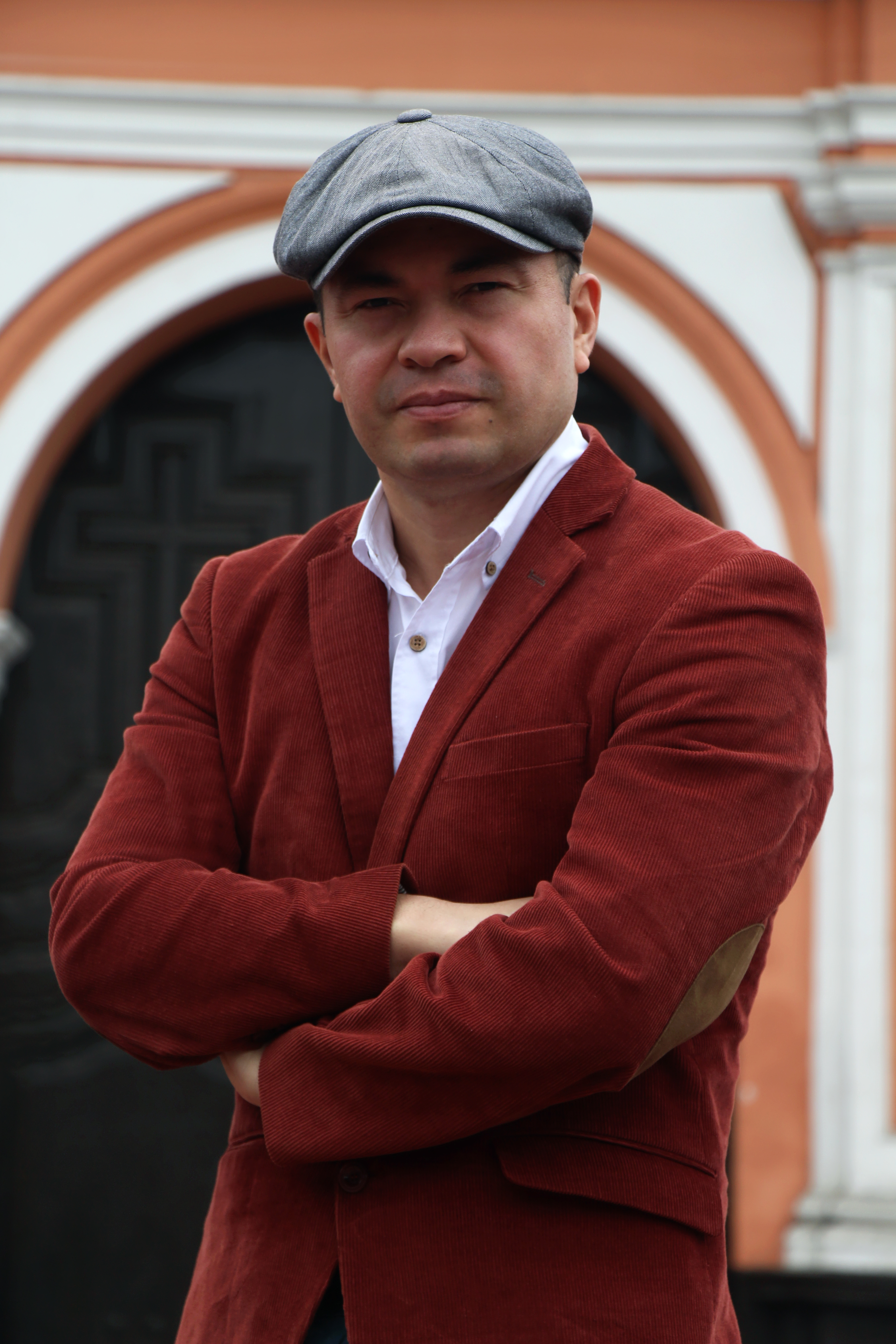
Pedro Novoa in 2017

Pedro Félix Novoa Castillo (Huacho, 19 November 1974 – 6 March 2021) was a Peruvian writer and educator.
