= Carlos Anderson (politician) =

Peruvian politician (1960–2025)

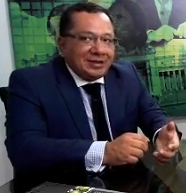
- Anderson in 2012

Member of the Congress of the Republic of Peru
- In office 27 July 2021 – 26 December 2025
- Constituency: Lima

Personal details
- Born: Carlos Antonio Anderson Ramírez; 13 June 1960 Lima, Peru
- Died: 26 December 2025 (aged 65) Lima, Peru
- Party: Podemos Perú
- Education: Universidad del Pacífico; University of London; London School of Economics

Carlos Antonio Anderson Ramírez (13 June 1960 – 26 December 2025) was a Peruvian politician. A member of Podemos Perú, he served in the Congress of the Republic of Peru from 2021 to 2025.

Anderson died in Lima on 26 December 2025, at the age of 65.
