= Hipólito Chaiña =

Peruvian physician and politician (1954–2021)

Hipólito Chaiña Contreras (February 3, 1954 – 22 February 2021) was a Peruvian physician and politician.

== Biography ==
Chaiña was born in Puno on February 3, 1954. He studied human medicine at the National University of San Agustín in the city of Arequipa between 1973 and 1985. Since then, he worked in his profession in the city of Arequipa in social security hospitals (EsSalud) from 1988 to 2019.

=== Political career ===
His first political participation occurred in the general elections of 2006 when he ran for Democratic Force as a candidate for congress for the department of Arequipa without obtaining representation. In the municipal elections of that same year he unsuccessfully attempted the mayor of the Paucarpata district. He also participated in the 2018 regional elections as a candidate for the regional governorship of Arequipa for the Independent Regional Movement Arequipa Mía without obtaining the election.

He served as a member of Congress since 2020.

=== Death ===
He died from COVID-19 during the COVID-19 pandemic in Peru.
