= Inca Rail =

Peruvian rail service

Inca Rail S.A.C.
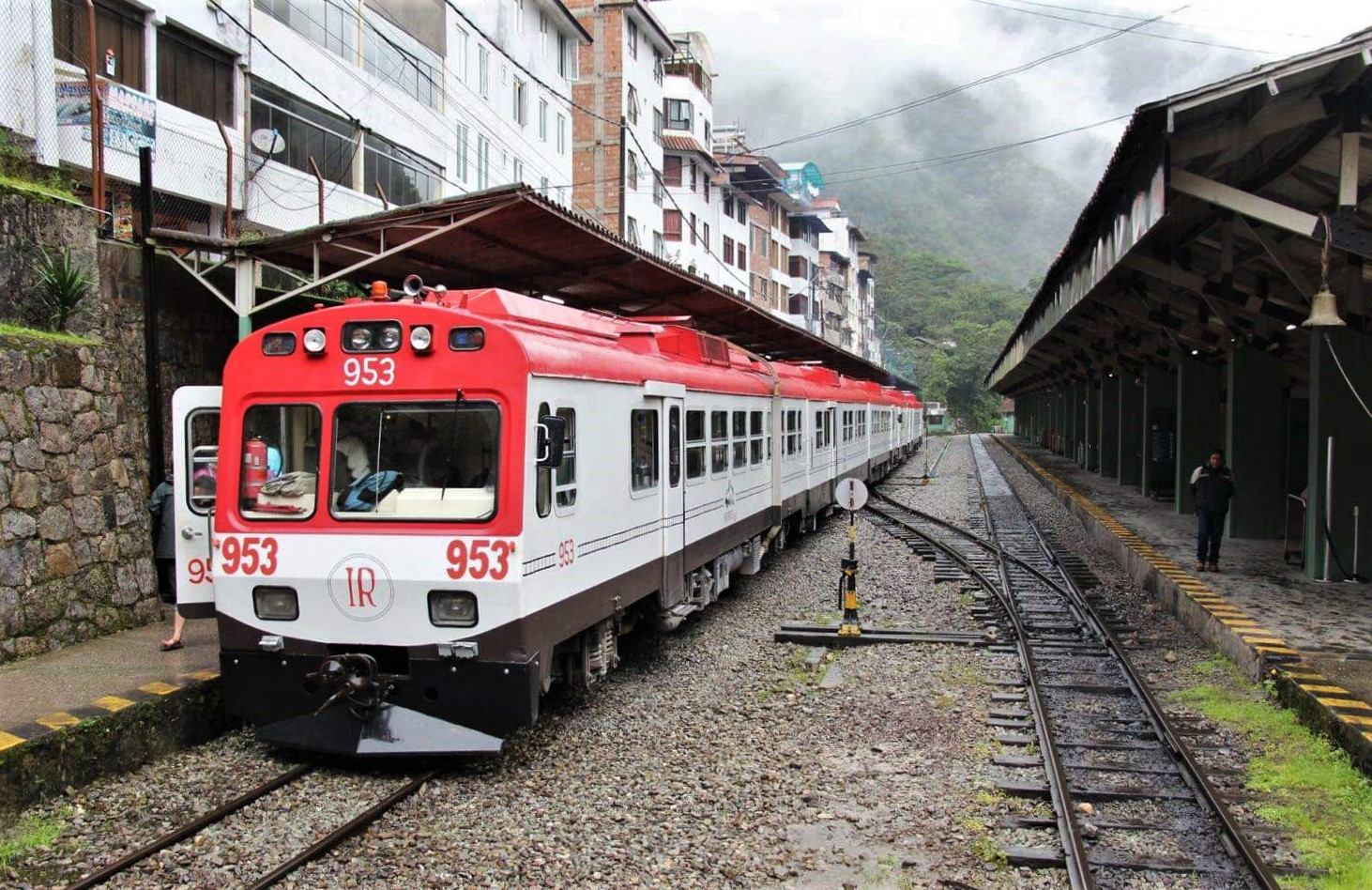
- IncaRail train at Aguas Calientes station.
- Type: Railway Company
- Industry: Rail Transport
- Founded: 2007
- Headquarters: Lima, Peru
- Brands: IncaRail
- Number of employees: 241
- Parent: The Carlyle Group
- Website: incarail.com

Inca Rail S.A.C. is a tourist train operator established in 2007. Its main headquarters are located in Lima, but it operates exclusively on the Southern Oriente Section of the Southern Railroad located in the Cusco Region. The company operates between Ollantaytambo rail station and Aguas Calientes station, primarily serving tourists visiting the Machu Picchu citadel.

Owned by the investment fund The Carlyle Peru, it is the sole competitor to PeruRail.

Inca Rail's rolling stock includes Duro Daković railcars (9), MAN railcars (ex-Feve-RENFE) (6), and LRV-2000 railcars (6).
