= Lucinda Vásquez =

Peruvian teacher and politician (1958–2026)

Member of the Congress of the Republic
- In office 26 July 2021 – 21 February 2026
- Constituency: San Martín

Personal details
- Born: 24 April 1958
- Died: 21 February 2026 (aged 67)
- Party: Free Peru

Lucinda Vásquez (1958 – 21 February 2026) was a Peruvian teacher and politician. She was a member of the Congress from 2021 until her death. Vásquez died on 21 February 2026, at the age of 67.
