= National Forestry and Wildlife Service =

Peruvian government agency

- Servicio Nacional Forestal y de Fauna Silvestre
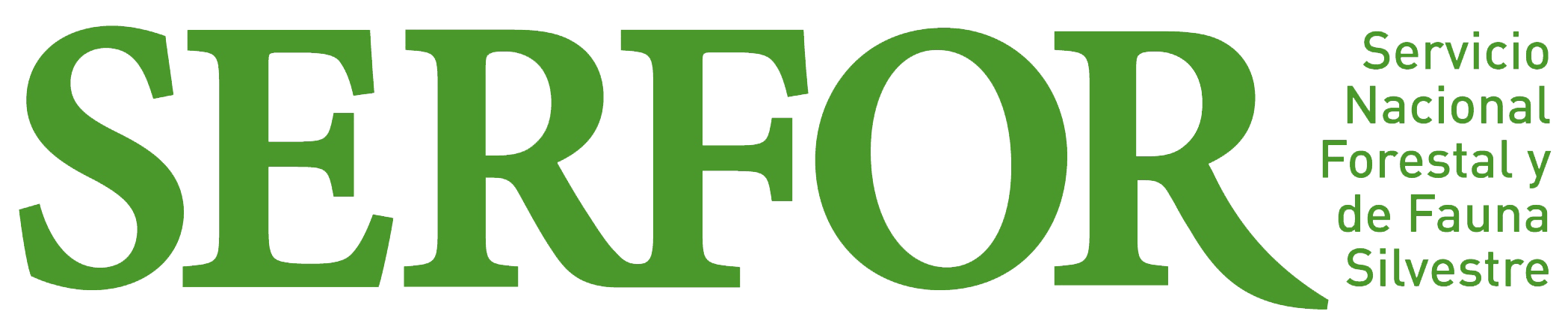

Agency overview
- Formed: July 26, 2014; 12 years ago
- Jurisdiction: Peru
- Headquarters: Calle Diecisiete 355, Urb. El Palomar, San Isidro, Lima
- Annual budget: S/109.1 million (FY 2024)
- Agency executive: Nelly Paredes Del Castillo, Executive Director
- Parent agency: Ministry of Agricultural Development and Irrigation
- Website: www.gob.pe/serfor

The National Forestry and Wildlife Service (SERFOR) is Peru's authority on forestry and wildlife. It was established by Law No. 29763, the Forest and Wildlife Law, and began operations on July 26, 2014.

SERFOR is an agency under the Ministry of Agricultural Development and Irrigation (MIDAGRI) and serves as the governing body of the National System of Forest and Wildlife Management (also known by the acronym of its Spanish name Sinafor).

== Mission ==
SERFOR's mission is to exercise technical and regulatory leadership to manage and promote the sustainability and competitiveness of the forestry and wildlife sectors for the benefit of the population and the environment, in an articulated and efficient manner.

== Functions ==
According to Article 14 of the Forest and Wildlife Law, SERFOR's functions include:

- Planning, supervising, executing, supporting, and controlling the National Forest and Wildlife Policy.
- Formulating, proposing, leading, and evaluating strategies, plans, and programs for the sustainable management of the nation's forest and wildlife heritage.
- Issuing and proposing national regulations and guidelines related to the management, administration, and sustainable use of forest and wildlife resources.
- Managing and promoting the sustainable use, conservation, and protection of forest and wildlife resources.
- Overseeing compliance with obligations under its jurisdiction and sanctioning violations of these obligations, respecting the authority of the Supervisory Body for Forest and Wildlife Resources (Osinfor), the Environmental Evaluation and Oversight Agency (OEFA), regional and local governments, and other public bodies.
- Supervising and evaluating the operation of the National System of Forest and Wildlife Management (Sinafor).
- Ordering the adoption of control and oversight measures, either directly or through third parties, for the management and use of forest and wildlife products protected by international treaties and national regulations.
- Conducting evaluations of the National Forest Heritage to provide objective evidence of its condition, supporting the development of oversight and sanctioning processes.
- Monitoring and supervising the implementation of measures established in the evaluation process.
- Approving the Annual Plan for Evaluation and Monitoring of compliance with current forestry and wildlife legislation, which is mandatory for authorities with competencies in forestry and wildlife matters.
- Issuing technical opinions related to the competencies assigned to national, regional, and local administrative authorities in forestry and wildlife matters.

== Regional Forest and Wildlife Technical Administrations (ATFFS) ==
The ATFFS aim to strengthen regional forest and wildlife management. They are responsible for control, supervision, oversight, and sanctioning in accordance with forest and wildlife regulations and within their respective areas of competence in regions where sectoral competencies in forestry and wildlife have not been transferred.

ATFFS offices are located in Cajamarca, Piura, Lambayeque, Áncash, Lima, Sierra Central, Selva Central, Apurímac, Ica, Arequipa, Moquegua-Tacna, Puno, and Cusco. These offices also serve as the Regional Forest and Wildlife Authorities (ARFFS) in the mentioned regions.

In regions where sectoral competencies in forestry and wildlife have been transferred, such as Tumbes, La Libertad, Huánuco, Amazonas, Loreto, Ucayali, San Martín, and Madre de Dios, the ARFFS is the regional government. SERFOR also has four liaison offices in San Martín, Madre de Dios, Ucayali, and Loreto.

== Allied Agency ==
=== OSINFOR ===
The Supervisory Body for Forest and Wildlife Resources (OSINFOR) is responsible for oversight and supervision of the use and conservation of forest and wildlife resources, their services, and other wild vegetation ecosystems granted through enabling titles.

== Related regulations ==
- Regulation of Organization and Functions (ROF) of SERFOR.
- Supreme Decree No. 014-2001-AG, Regulation of the Forest and Wildlife Law.
- Supreme Decree No. 018-2015-MINAGRI, Regulation for Forest Management.
- Supreme Decree No. 019-2015-MINAGRI, Regulation for Wildlife Management.
- Supreme Decree No. 020-2015-MINAGRI, Regulation for the Management of Forest Plantations and Agroforestry Systems.
- Supreme Decree No. 021-2015-MINAGRI, Regulation for Forest and Wildlife Management in Native and Peasant Communities.
- Directorial Council Resolution No. 006-2019-OEFA/CD, Oversight Regulation.
