= Irma Maury =

Peruvian actress

- Born: Irma Juana Maury Olivera; January 12, 1950 (age 76); Lima, Peru
- Occupation: Actress
- Years active: 1983–present

Irma Juana Maury Olivera (born 12 January 1950) is a Peruvian actress, best known for her roles in the TV series Los de arriba y los de abajo and Al Fondo Hay Sitio.

== Career ==
Irma Muary began an ascending career in 1978, along with the "Group Histrión". With the institution she participated in several plays, sharing the stage with actors like Willy Gutiérrez, Adolfo Chuiman, Carlos Velasquez, Jorge Montoro, among others.

Maury debuted on TV with the series Tal como somos (1983), and started in the comedy with Risas y Salsa (1988).

In 1994 she portrayed Esmeralda in the telenovela Los de arriba y los de abajo. The following year she appeared in Los unos y los otros.

In 1996 she appeared in the TV series Tribus de la calle and Lluvia de arena.

From 2001 to 2004 she portrayed Doña Olga in the TV series Mil Oficios. Years later she returned to the television with the miniseries Rita y yo, Los del barrio and Magnolia Merino.

The first season of Al Fondo Hay Sitio—where Maury plays the role of Doña Nelly—debuts on March 30, 2009. Along with the cast, she also had special participations in circuses.

== Filmography ==
=== Television ===
- Tal como somos (1983)
- Risas y Salsa (1988)
- Plaza picante (1993)
- Tatán (1993)
- Los de arriba y los de abajo (1994) como Doña Esmeralda.
- Los unos y los otros (1995) como Cleofé.
- Tribus de la calle (1996) como Jeovita.
- Lluvia de arena (1996)
- Todo se compra, todo se vende (1997)
- La rica vicky (1998) como Zelmira.
- Mil Oficios (2001—2004) como Doña Olga Gómez de Palacios.
- Rita y yo (2007) como Saby.
- Los del barrio (2008) como Mamá Lucha.
- Magnolia Merino (2008—2009) como Tía Flora.
- Al Fondo Hay Sitio (2009—present) como Doña Nelly Camacho Morote de Collazos.

=== Films ===
- La paisana Jacinta en búsqueda de Wasaberto (2017)
