= Yanaquihua District =

Yanaquihua
- District
- Coat of arms
- Interactive map of Yanaquihua
- Coordinates: 15°41′15″S 73°01′50″W
- Country: Peru
- Region: Arequipa
- Province: Condesuyos
- Founded: January 2, 1857
- Capital: Yanaquihua

Government
  - Mayor: James Casquino Escobar

Area
  - Total: 1,057.07 km^{2} (408.14 sq mi)
- Elevation: 3,000 m (9,800 ft)

Population (2005 census)
  - Total: 4,551
  - Density: 4.305/km^{2} (11.15/sq mi)
- Time zone: UTC-5 (PET)
- UBIGEO: 040608

Yanaquihua District is one of eight districts of the province Condesuyos in Peru.
