= Aguas Calientes, Peru =

Machupicchu Machu Pikchu Machupicchu Pueblo
- Town
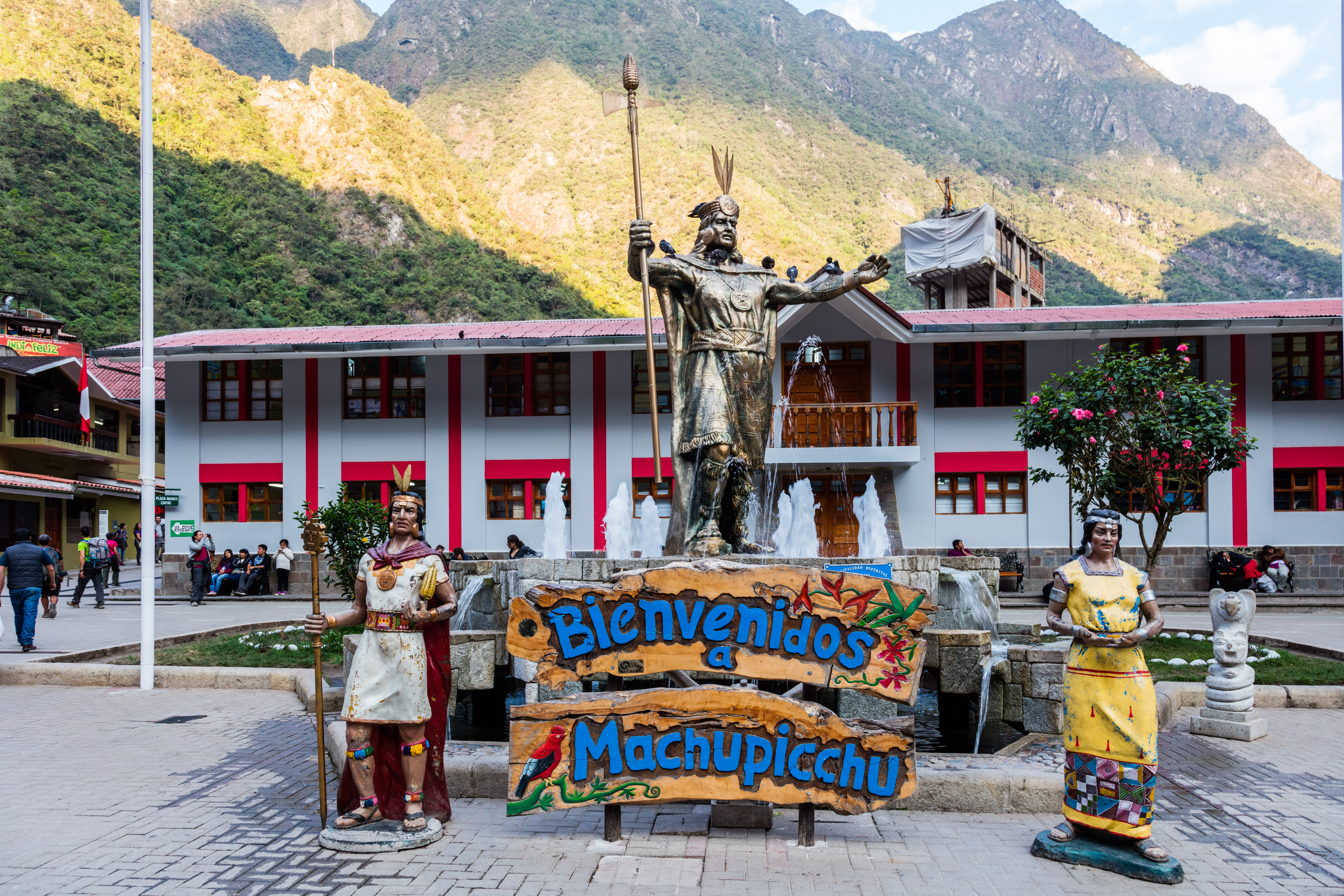
- Statue of Pachacutec

- Location within Peru
- Coordinates: 13°9′17″S 72°31′31″W
- Country: Peru
- Region: Cusco
- Province: Urubamba
- District: Machupicchu
- Settled: 1901
- District Capital: 1 October 1941

Government
  - Mayor: Darwin Baca León (2019–2022)
- Elevation: 2,040 m (6,690 ft)

Population (2017)
  - Total: 4,525
- Time zone: UTC-5 (PET)

Machupicchu or Machupicchu Pueblo, also known as Aguas Calientes, is a location in Peru situated in the Cusco Region, Urubamba Province. It is the seat of Machupicchu District. Machupicchu lies at the Vilcanota River. It is the closest access point to the historical site of Machu Picchu which is 6 kilometres (3.7 mi) away or about a 90-minute walk. There are many hotels and restaurants for tourists, as well as natural hot baths which gave the town its colloquial Spanish name, Aguas Calientes or hot water. Like Machu Picchu, Aguas Calientes is not accessible by road, and the only way to reach Aguas Calientes is by train or by hiking.

The village of Machupicchu did not exist until the railroad was built, as it was a center for construction workers. It took off after the railroad opened in 1931 and foreign tourists started arriving to visit the Machu Picchu ruins. Enterprising individuals set up businesses serving the tourists, primarily restaurants and small hotels. Those who could afford luxury stayed at the luxury hotel up by the ruins.

== Origin of the city's name ==
The official name comes from Quechua Machu Pikchu from machu old, old person, pikchu pyramid; mountain; or prominence with a broad base that ends in sharp peaks. The addition of "pueblo" comes from the Spanish word for town. It was formerly called Aguas Calientes meaning "hot waters" or "hot springs".

== History ==
Settled by a few farm families in 1901, the settlement was transformed into a busy railway worker's camp called Maquinachayoq (from Quechua makina (a borrowing from Spanish máquina, machine/locomotive/train, -plus the diminutive -cha suffix and -yuq possession suffix, i.e. "(place) with a little train", Makinachayuq) during the construction of the railroad through there in the late 1920s. The town was the central hub for worker lodging and their equipment until the railway was completed in 1931.

== Transport ==
Machupicchu serves as a terminal for the PeruRail and Inca Rail passenger train services from Cusco. Trains serve locals and tourists arriving from Cusco and Ollantaytambo to visit Machu Picchu.

Avenue Pachacutec is the main and only thoroughfare of the town, connecting the baths to the town's main square.

== Industry ==
The Central Machupicchu Hydroelectric Plant (Hidroelectrica) is nearby at the Urubamba River. It generates about 90 MW for the regions of Cusco, Puno, and Apurímac. It was first constructed between 1958 and 1965 and expanded between 1981 and 1985. The plant was damaged by a landslide on 28 February 1998 and ceased operations until 13 July 2001.

== Climate ==
Climate data for Machu Picchu (elevation 2,399 m (7,871 ft), 1991–2020 normals)
Month	Jan	Feb	Mar	Apr	May	Jun	Jul	Aug	Sep	Oct	Nov	Dec	Year
Mean daily maximum °C (°F)	20.6 (69.1)	20.6 (69.1)	21.0 (69.8)	21.5 (70.7)	21.9 (71.4)	22.0 (71.6)	22.1 (71.8)	23.1 (73.6)	23.4 (74.1)	22.8 (73.0)	22.8 (73.0)	21.2 (70.2)	21.9 (71.5)
Mean daily minimum °C (°F)	11.8 (53.2)	11.9 (53.4)	11.9 (53.4)	11.7 (53.1)	10.8 (51.4)	10.0 (50.0)	9.4 (48.9)	10.0 (50.0)	11.1 (52.0)	11.5 (52.7)	12.0 (53.6)	12.0 (53.6)	11.2 (52.1)
Average precipitation mm (inches)	340.7 (13.41)	324.5 (12.78)	340.6 (13.41)	184.1 (7.25)	73.4 (2.89)	50.8 (2.00)	54.2 (2.13)	60.6 (2.39)	76.2 (3.00)	163.0 (6.42)	172.5 (6.79)	275.4 (10.84)	2,116 (83.31)
Source: National Meteorology and Hydrology Service of Peru

== Gallery ==
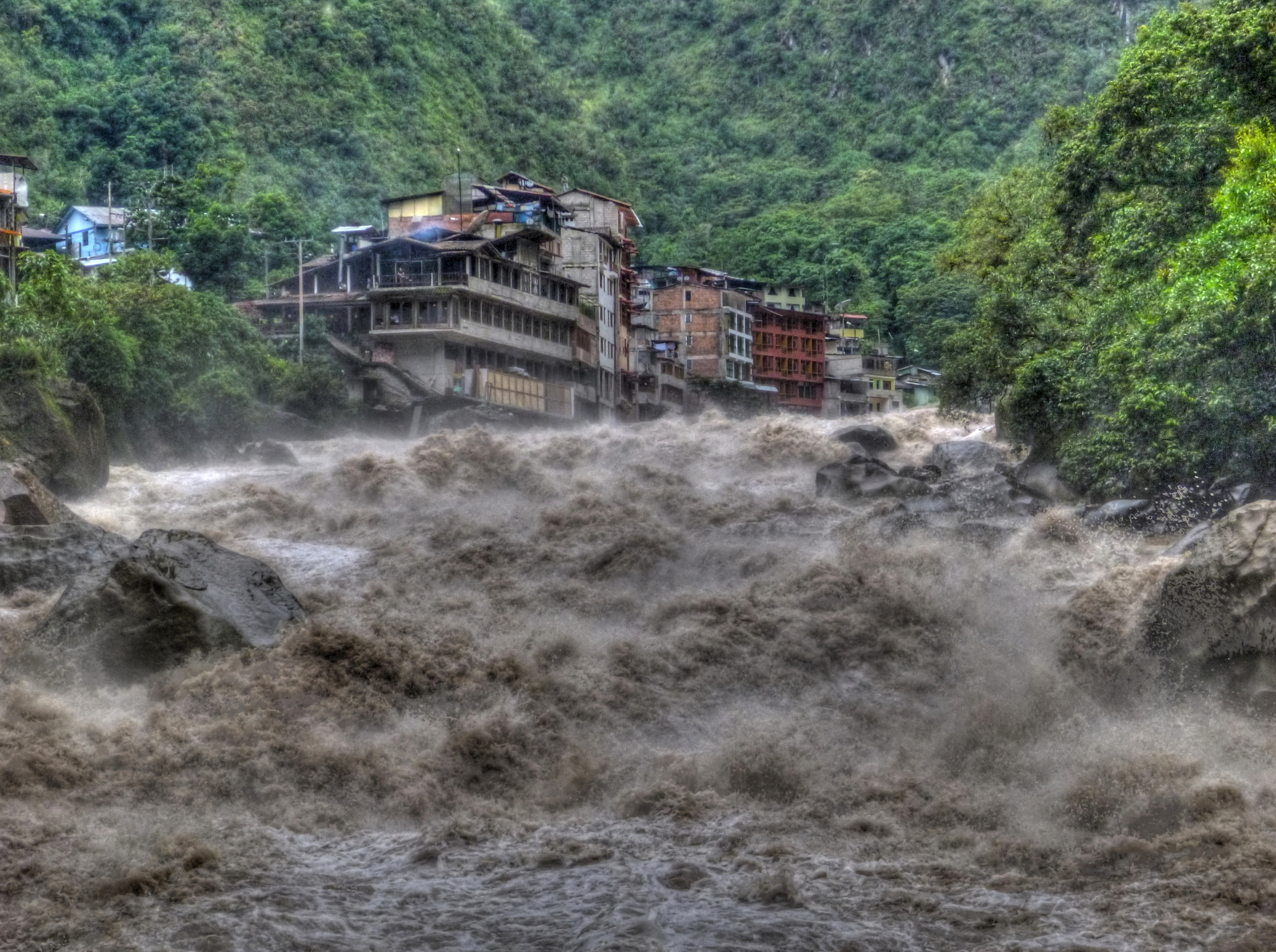
Urubamba River

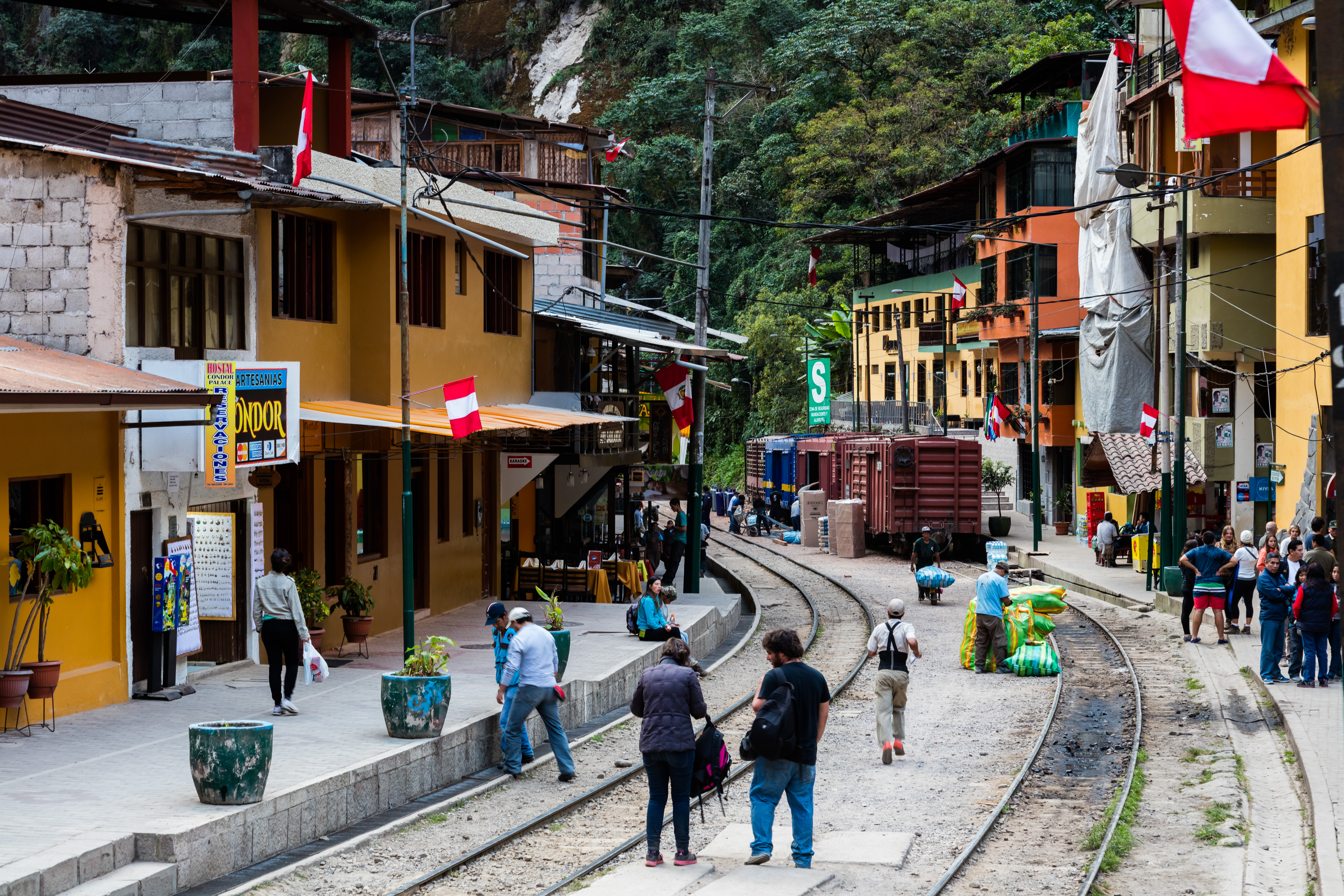
Train tracks bisect the town

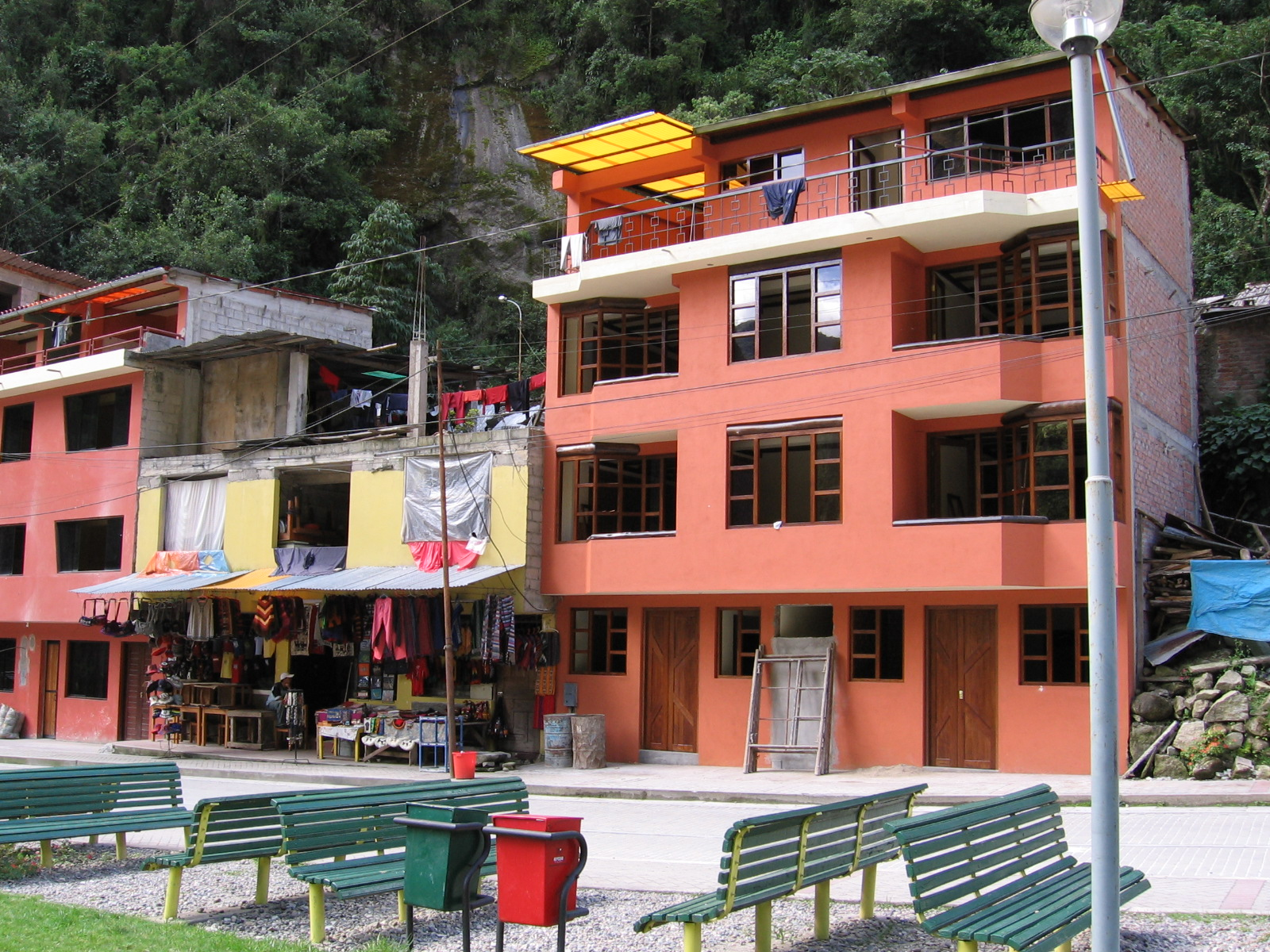
Machupicchu Village Scene, March 2006

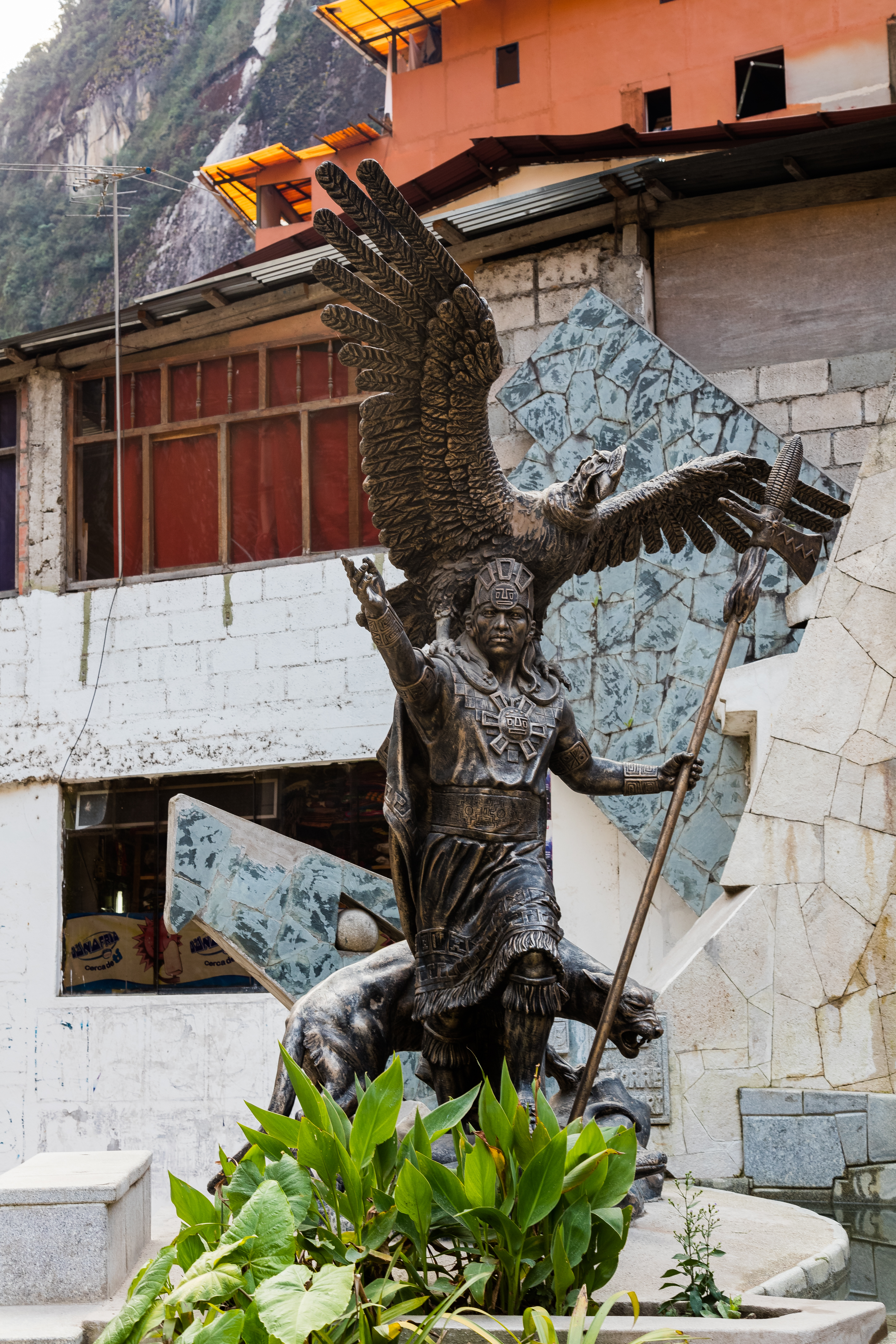
Statue of Inka

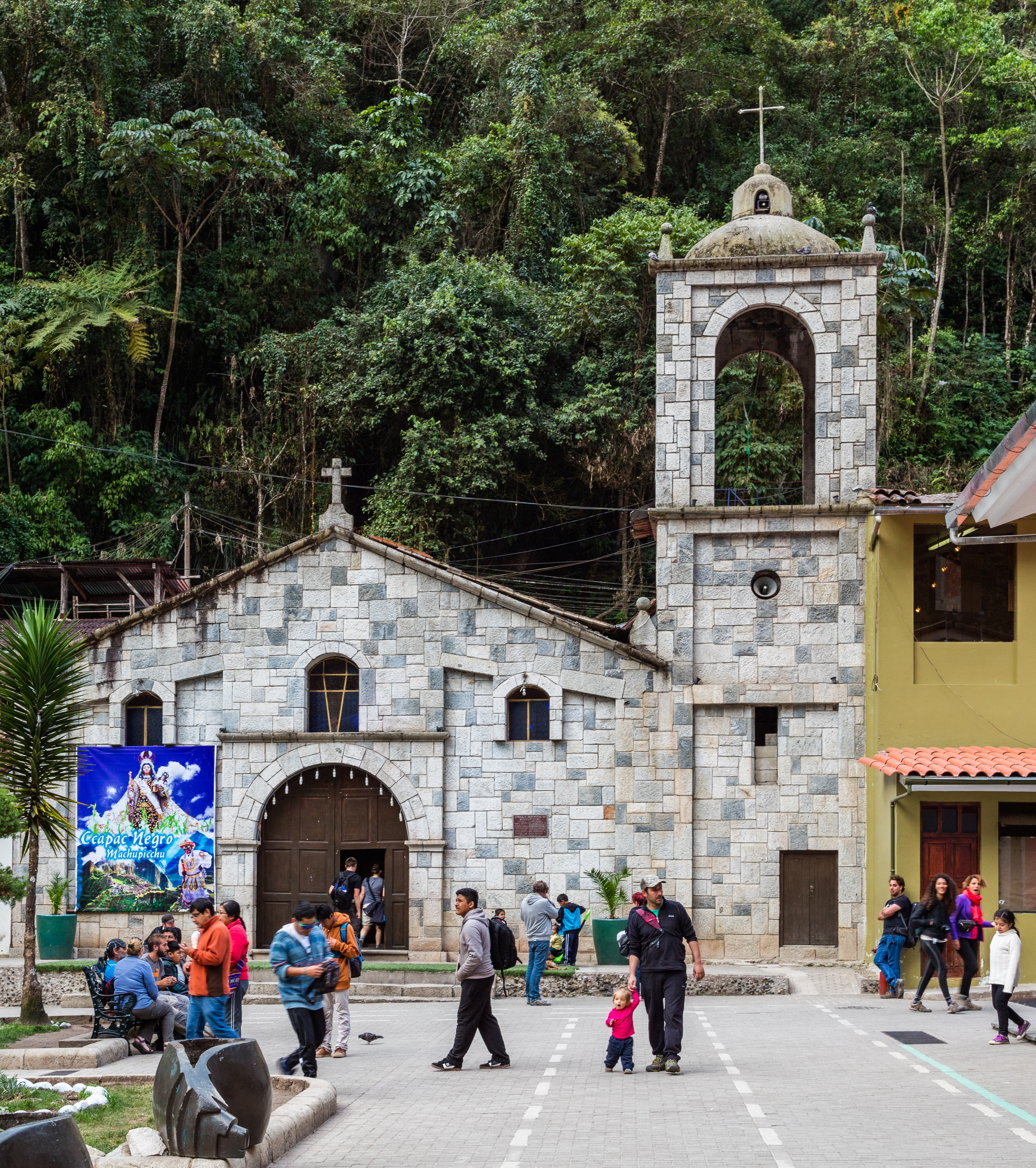
Church of Machu Picchu

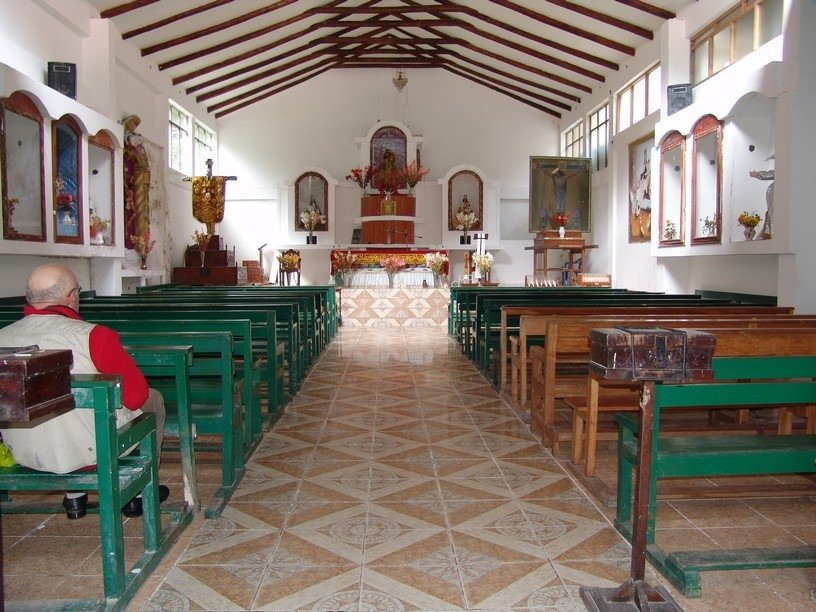
Interior of the church

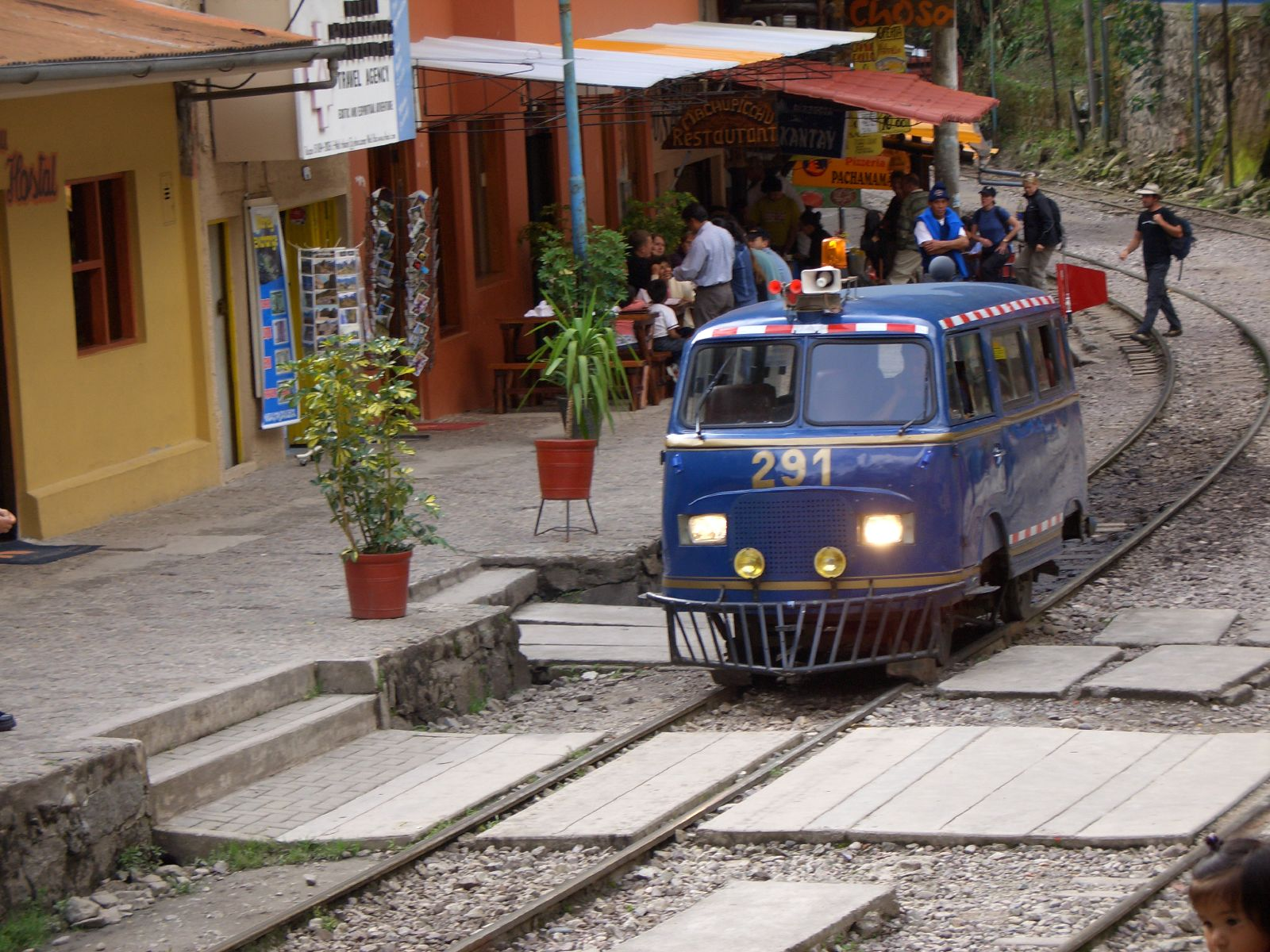
Railbus Officials in Aguas Calientes.

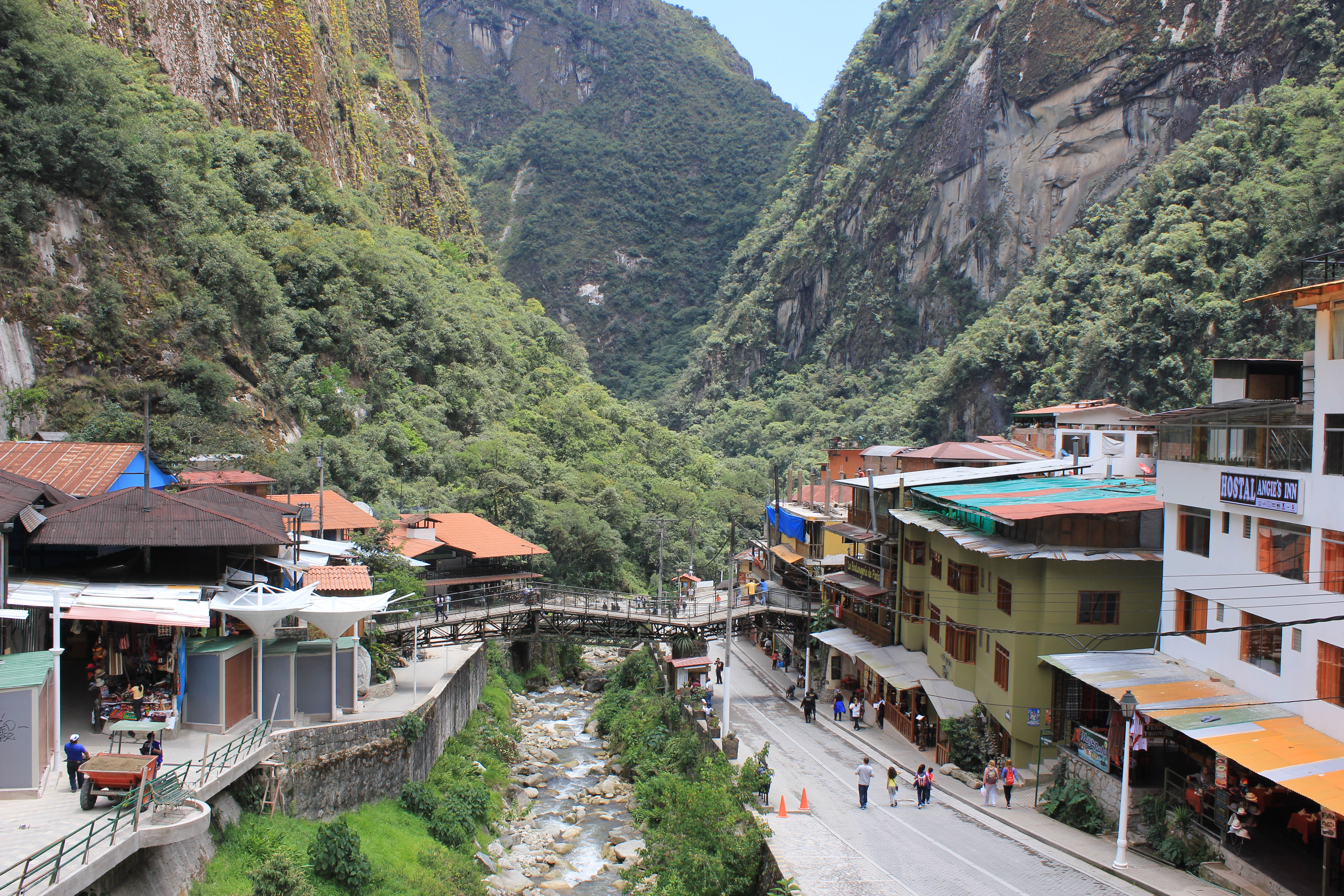
Rio Aguas Calientes flowing through the town.

== Twin towns ==
- Haworth, United Kingdom
- Otama village, Fukushima Prefecture, Japan
- Fukushima, Japan
- Petra, Jordan
- Medley, United States
- Tinúm, Mexico

== See also ==
- Tourism in Peru
- Wiñay Wayna
