= La paisana Jacinta en búsqueda de Wasaberto =

- Theatrical release poster
- Directed by: Adolfo Aguilar
- Written by: Adán Blanco; Sandro Ventura
- Story by: Adolfo Aguilar
- Produced by: Sandro Ventura
- Starring: Jorge Benavides
- Cinematography: Hugo Shinki
- Edited by: José Luis Membrillo; Sandro Ventura
- Production company: Big Bang Films
- Release date: November 23, 2017
- Running time: 93 minutes
- Country: Peru
- Language: Spanish

La paisana Jacinta en búsqueda de Wasaberto (lit. 'The Paisana Jacinta in search of Wasaberto') is a 2017 Peruvian comedy film directed by Adolfo Aguilar and written by Adán Blanco and Sandro Ventura. It is based on the character of Jorge Benavides, La paisana Jacinta.

== Plot ==
Jacinta returns to Chongomarca (a fictional town in the Ayacucho department) with the mission of finding her husband, Wasaberto. But she meets Julinho, an engineer from the Brazilian construction company Odebrecht, which plans to tear down the place where Jacinta lives to build a hotel complex. Jacinta meets her old friend Guillermina who tells her that Odebrecht had acquired the property illegally through a real estate swindler and Wasaberto had traveled to Lima in order to collect the necessary documents to prevent the construction company from destroying his home. In this way, Jacinta returns to Lima and meets Father Bartolomé who gives her information about Wasaberto. In the parish house, Jacinta begins to pray asking God for help for the fate of her husband and her house, but she is interrupted by a street girl who calls herself Rafa who accompanies her to the Notary. Johana, one of the notary's officials who had previously helped Wasaberto, agrees to help Jacinta with the documents under the surveillance of Dra Sifuentes and her henchmen Agapito and Yuca. Jacinta, on Johana's recommendation, goes to the police station with Rafa to file a complaint for Wasaberto's disappearance where they make a peculiar spoken portrait of Wasaberto and Lieutenant Vásquez suggests Jacinta go to the General Hospital and the Morgue to rule out that she is missing. dead or hospitalized. Very scared, Jacinta goes with Rafa to the General Hospital and although there were N.N. in serious condition, none were Wasaberto. Meanwhile, Johana asks her friend Napoleón (who is in love with her and works in the court) for help to expedite the paperwork while being watched by Agapito. Then Johana returns to the Notary but Dr. Sifuentes calls her and warns her not to continue helping Jacinta since it was a topic that did not suit her, at that moment Dr. Sifuentes receives a call and Johana takes the opportunity to stay with all the documents, at that moment Johana receives a call from Napoleon where he confirms that she has the remaining documentation but must leave the Notary since Dr. Sifuentes was linked to the scammers. Likewise, Johana discovers through the call of Dr. Sifuentes who asks Agapito to kill her for knowing too much. Johana runs away with the documents while being intimidated by Agapito.

At the hospital, Johana meets Jacinta who helps her enter the morgue to determine if any of the bodies was Wasaberto's, fortunately none of them belonged to him. Later, Jacinta and Johana go out to meet Napoleon, although Jacinta realizes that Rafa is no longer with her. In a street they meet Napoleon who delivers the complete documentation, but they are captured by Dra Sifuentes and her henchmen who take the documents from them and confess the truth of the scam as well as the kidnapping of Wasaberto. Napoleón struggles with Agapito and Yuca while Johana retrieves the papers and flees, but Dr. Cifuentes shoots Johana in the back and Jacinta runs through, receiving the shot in the chest where she falls and later dies in the hospital.

In heaven, Jacinta meets Rafa who was actually an angel and tells her that for her act of courage, they would allow her to return to earth and continue searching for Wasaberto. Jacinta wakes up in the hospital and together with Father Bartolomé they go to the warehouse where Wasaberto, Johana and Napoleon were kidnapped. Jacinta confronts Dr. Sifuentes and her henchmen again, but the police arrive and arrest them. Jacinta recovers the documents but is informed that Wasaberto had fled without a fixed destination. Already with the documents Jacinta returns to Chongomarca and manages to stop the work but feels sad for not having found Wasaberto, but Guillermina gives her a letter in which Wasaberto said that he was arriving on the afternoon train. Jacinta quickly goes to the station and manages to reunite with Wasaberto.

== Cast ==
- Jorge Benavides as Paisana Jacinta
- Alfredo Benavides Gastello as Sergeant Bustamante
- Haydeé Cáceres as Guillermina
- Carlos Vílchez as Agapito
- Enrique Mirror "Yucca"
- Julinho as Lord of Demolition
- René Farrait as Father Bartholomew
- Carlos Solano as Lieutenant Vásquez
- Jessica Newton as Mrs. Valley
- Ximena Hoyos as Johanna
- Irma Maury as Dra Sifuentes
- Gustavo Borjas as Napoleon
- Nicolas Fantinatus
- Guillermo Castañeda as Sergeant Mendoza
- Carolain Cawen Woman #1 on plane
- Maria Irma Estremadoyro Woman #2 on plane
- Natalia Málaga Woman #1 at the police station
- Gigi Miter Woman #2 at the police station

== Idealization ==
Since 2013, JB announced that one of his next projects would be to make a movie of the character. At first he said that the idea was planned in 2000 but it would not be successful due to lack of budget. After the reception of the film Asu Mare, in 2016, the comedian indicated that he was in negotiations for a possible film saga without giving details.

== Production ==
The producer of Big Bang Films, Sandro Ventura, announced that the shooting of the film will begin in July of the same year, and the script will also be written by Jorge Benavides.

== Location ==
The film was shot in Antioquia and in Lima.

== Soundtrack ==
On July 21 of this year, a symphonic and orchestral version of the theme "Me voy para Lema" (original song of the series) was released, which will be in the film. This version of the song by La Paisana Jacinta was produced by Tito Silva and for the voice of the song is Roze Van Den Broek. The version is an adaptation of the song "Time" from the movie Inception. Ultimately this song was not used, and was replaced by songs made by the Peruvian musical group "Corazón Serrano", including their own version of "Me voy para Lema"

== Controversies ==
The film caused a series of controversies when it was announced and then released in theaters, due to the characterization of the person of Jacinta, who can be considered racist towards the indigenous women of Peru. Protests were made against its release and signatures were sought to prevent its screening. The situation worsened when Jorge Benavides, creator and director of the character, made a comment mocking indigenous women.

== Sequel cancelled ==
In January 2018, Jorge Benavides stated that although there are no immediate plans to make a sequel to the film due to strong criticism of racism and discrimination, he is considering the possibility, although at the moment he does not plan to play the character again. In October 2020, the Superior Court of Justice of Cusco ratified the order that Latina Televisión cease broadcasting La paisana Jacinta for constituting an offense and a racist attack to the dignity of indigenous Andean women, safely eliminating the possibility of a second film of the character being made.
