= Fiestas Patrias (Peru) =

Holiday celebrating Peru's independence from the Spanish Empire

Fiestas Patrias Independence Day (Peru)
- Also called: 28 de Julio, Dia de la Independencia, Fiestas
- Observed by: Peru, some non-Peruvians; United States, Peruvian Americans
- Date: 28 July (official); 29 July (public observance and most activities)

The Fiestas Patrias peruanas, or Peruvian National Holidays, are celebrations of Peru's independence from the Spanish Empire. They officially consist of two days:

- 28 July, in commemoration of Peru's Independence won by José de San Martín (1821)
- 29 July, in honor of the Armed Forces and the National Police of Peru

The celebration of Fiestas Patrias in Peru coincides with the vacation periods for the local schools as well as some businesses. The first celebration starts on 25 July, on St. James’ Day in Arequipa with the Feast of St. James.

Along with Christmas, Fiestas Patrias is one of the most important celebrations of the year for Peruvians and it is normal for local businesses to generate as much revenue as in the month of December. Tourism tends to increase during these holidays with visitors coming to join in the celebrations.

== 28 July ==
28 July in each year commemorates the day that Peru gained its independence. General José de San Martín, known as Peru's liberator, proclaimed Peru's independence on this date.

At dawn on 28 July a 21 cannon salute begins flag-raising ceremonies as Peru remembers the anniversary of its independence.

=== Use of the flag ===
Peruvian Flag

During the whole month of July, homes, office buildings, public and private institutions, schools, and restaurants display the national flag. It is obligatory and it is rare to see any of these places without a flag.

=== Regarding the President ===
The President of Peru fulfills one of their major obligations during these days. In his capacity as Head of State he must, on July 28 of each year, give an accounting of the nation's progress up to this date. This Peruvian custom was established by José de San Martín.

==== Te Deum Mass ====
On the morning of 28 July the Archbishop of Lima celebrates the Mass of the Te Deum as mandated by the Catholic Church. Originally, the Mass was celebrated on 29 July but was later changed to its present date. The President, other government officials, and ranking dignitaries attend the service.

The Mass officially begins at 9:00 A.M.

==== Invitation of the President of the Republic ====
On the morning of 28 July representatives of the Congress of the Republic of Peru go to the Government Palace to invite the President to give the traditional Address to the Nation.

The delegation of the Peruvian Legislature can be led by any congressman or by the President of the Congress.

==== Route to the Congress ====
Once he has been invited, the President leaves by car headed toward the seat of Congress or, rarely, on foot. The nation's leader will sometimes choose to travel in a closed limousine or in a car with an open roof.

It is common on this route for the President's supporter's to accompany them throwing flowers and shouting praises. During the presidency of Alan García Pérez the trip was always made in an open car.

Once he arrives at the seat of the legislature they enters through the Hall of the Lost Footsteps where the Commander in Chief of the military detachment pays their respects to his high position. The President then enters the main room where they finds the general assembly.

==== Address to the Nation ====
Following the introductions, the President begins with their Address to the Nation for the National Holidays giving his accounting of the developments of the state during the year. The President discusses developments in projects economical, social, and cultural achievements as well as others. However, it is not uncommon for these accomplishments to be exaggerated.

==== Return to the Government Palace ====
Once finished with his address the President returns to Government Palace (commonly referred to as the House of Pizarro) to continue with other official ceremonies.

== 29 July ==
On 29 July, most celebrations are carried out in the morning although the formal celebrations are in the afternoon.

=== The Great Military Parade ===
In this ceremony the Peruvian Armed Forces and National Police participate in a grand procession. Decorations are placed throughout the main streets with patriotic colors.

During the ceremony representatives of the three branches as well as the National Police as well as other invitees for a parade. Every military institution is represented. During this ceremony almost all of Peru's weaponry is on display although the most key pieces are not shown as a matter of Defense policy. The military staff on display is minimal.

== Oath of the President (if newly elected) ==
If a new President has been elected, it is the day of 28 July on which they assume their duties. It is also their first Address to the Nation.

== See also ==
- Public holidays in Peru
- Fiestas Patrias (disambiguation)
