= Venezuelan rock =

Rock music from Venezuela

- Stylistic origins: Blues, psychedelic rock, rock and roll, venezuelan folk
- Cultural origins: Early 1960s Caracas, Maracaibo, Valencia

Subgenres
- Joropo rock, Gaita rock

Fusion genres
- Ska punk, latin rock, electronic rock, progressive rock, alternative rock

Regional scenes
- Caracas, Maracaibo, Valencia, Mérida

Other topics
- Festival Nuevas Bandas

Venezuelan rock is rock music from Venezuela, the most common being based on Rock en español.

== History ==
=== 1960s ===
First steps for rock music in Venezuela started by the oil industry jump in the late 1950s and can be traced to the band Los Flipper, The Thunderbirds and Los Dangers, where after Rudy Márquez, it would be part with Henry Stephen of Los Impala, a band from the prominent crude oil city Maracaibo and the first South American group with a high reputation and considerable impact in other continents (pretty much of his career in Spain).

=== 1970s ===
Subsequently, some bands in the 1970s, such as Una Luz, People Pie, El Zigui, La Cuarta Calle, Témpano and the progressive rock trio Ficción (Sobre el Abismo). Ficción became emblematic in the Venezuelan Prog Rock scene and is still very active, they released (May 2013) their third album: Ficción III-Sobre La Ira de Dios. Then also came a heavy metal, hard rock movement with Sacrifice, Power Age that later would become Arkangel founded by Paul Gilman and Freddy Marshall, Uzi, Spectro and José Arevalo Rock Band, Resistencia, Fahrenheit, Grand Bite and Alta Frecuencia. As for the blues music, while a few artists did occasionally perform some classic blues in English since the late '60's, the first band recording blues music with Spanish lyrics was Pastel de Gente that released two albums in the mid 1980s. Some of the most prominent artists in the 1980s were the band Aditus and the soloists Melissa and also Jorge Aguilar, who mixed rock with pop and other trends, such as the new wave, synth pop and funk respectively, making the genre more digestible to the larger audience.

=== 1980s ===
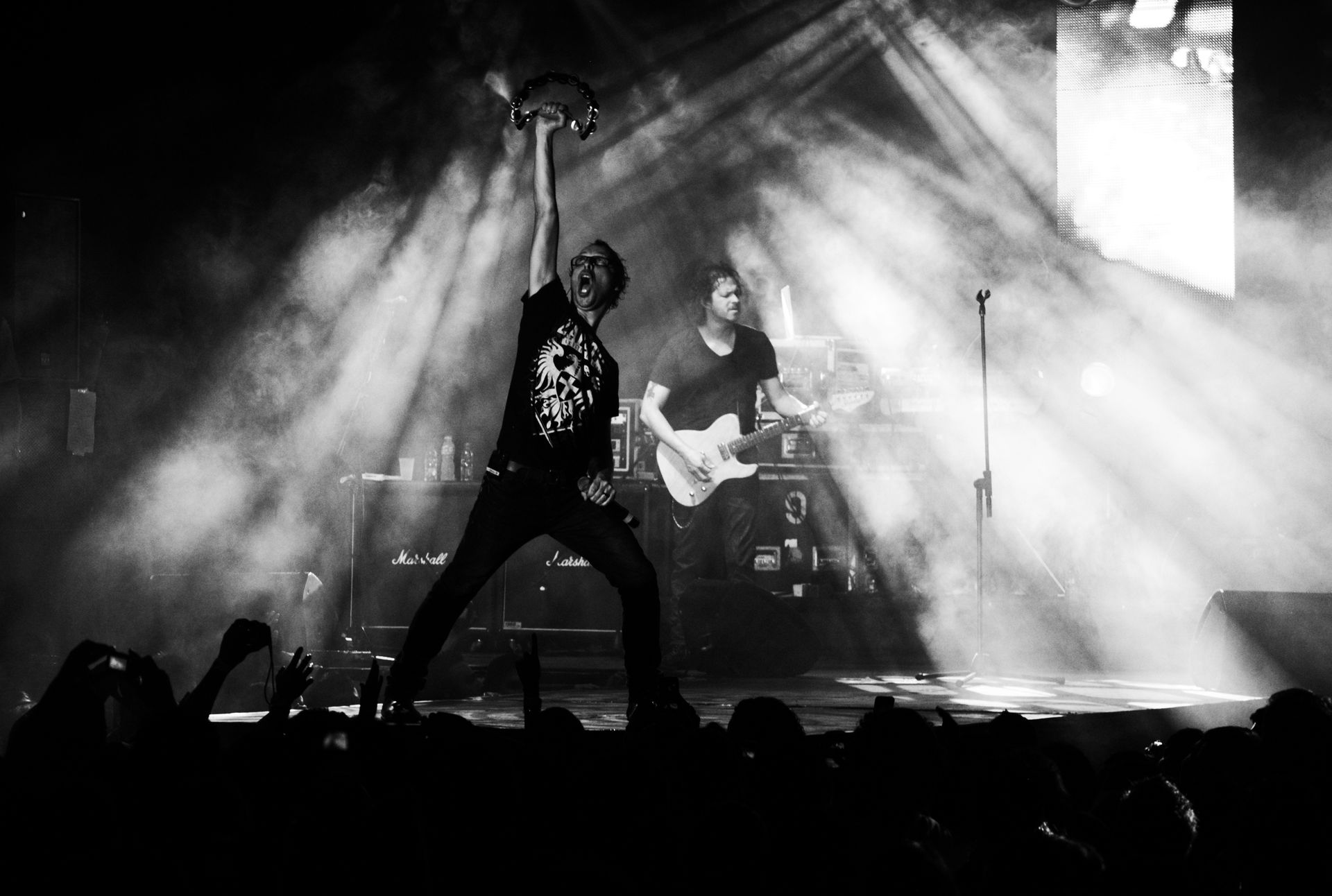
Zapato 3

While efforts were mostly oriented to the commercial pop/rock scene, from the underground-punk scene of the 1980s emerged several bands with international promotion, such as Sentimiento Muerto and Desorden Público, whose first production was launched in 1987, despite the blockade in the media of some of their music due to their strong political views and mildly offensive language. However, both bands' first recordings achieved a huge success, which led to the record companies change of attitude towards them, both allowing them to record additional records, and opening the doors for other emerging bands of the late 80's, such as Zapato 3, and Sentimiento Muerto, among others. La Misma Gente and Seguridad Nacional are considered cult bands of that decade.

=== 1990s ===
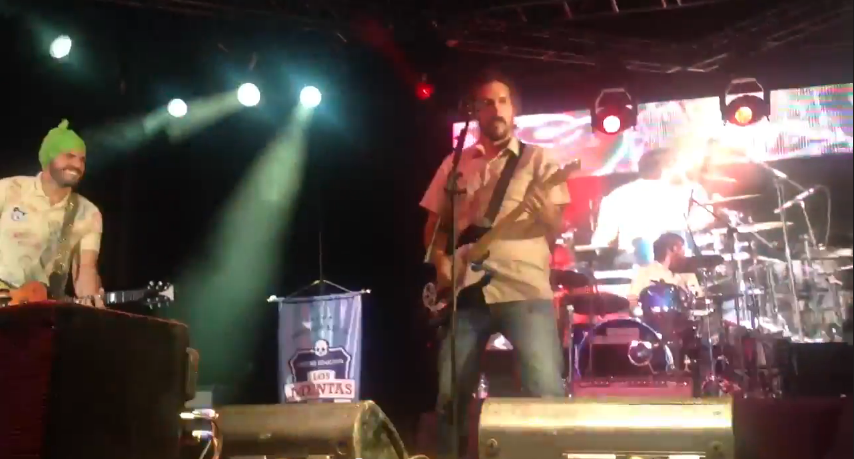
Los Mentas

In the 1990s, many new bands appeared, such as Caramelos de Cianuro, Los Mentas, Malanga, Levítico and Candy 66. Dermis Tatú, La Puta Eléctrica, LaMuyBestiaPop, Krueger, La Calle, Los Gusanos, Pacífica, Spías, and Laberinto are considered cult bands of that decade.

=== 2000s ===
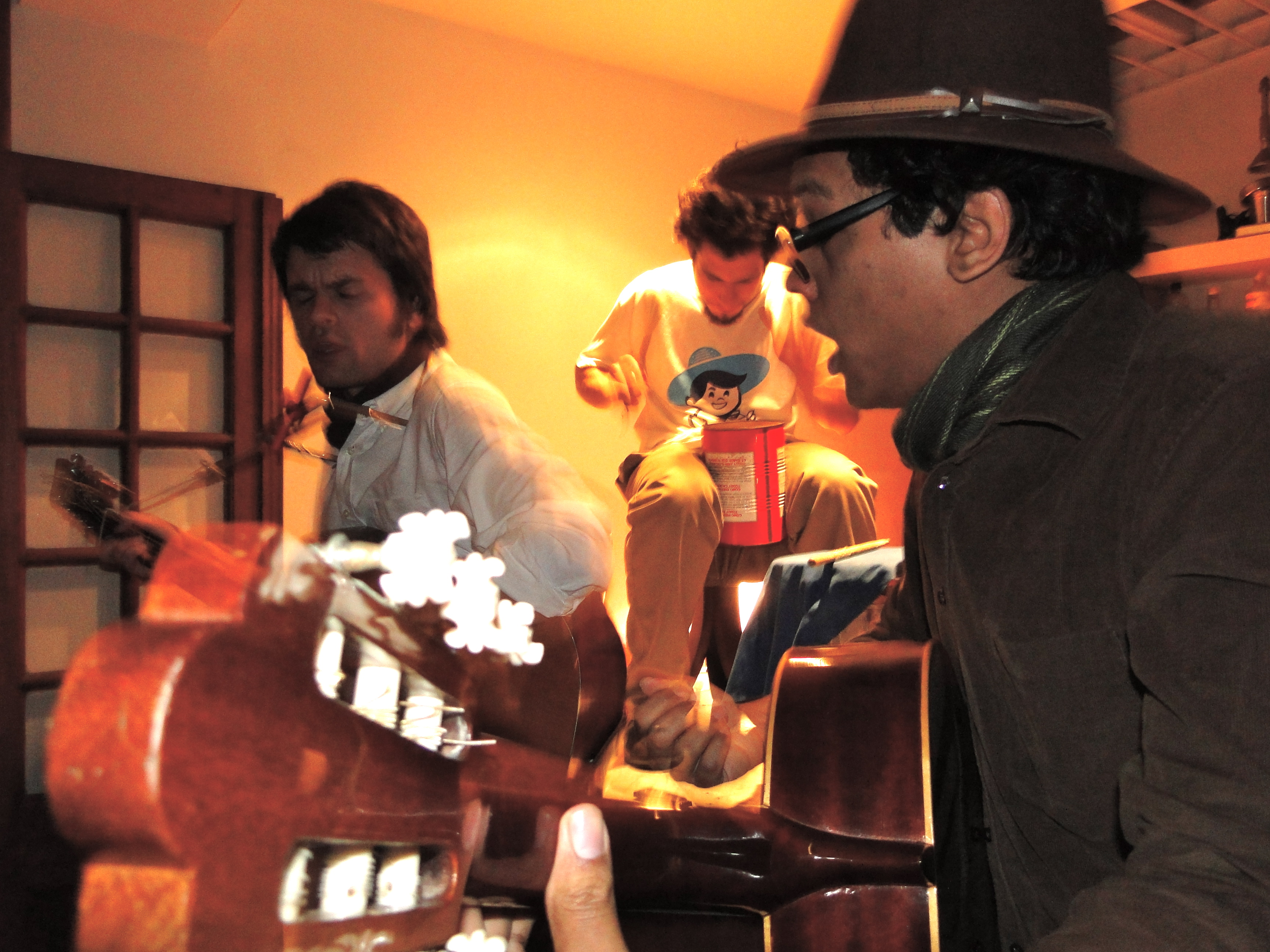
José Ignacio Benítez and Gustavo Guerrero, members of Domingo en llamas and Cunaguaro Soul

Several new bands have emerged trying to push again the Venezuelan rock scene. Bands like Viniloversus, La Vida Bohème, Los Paranoias, Unos Panas Ahí, TLX, Atkinson, Telegrama, Los Pixel, The Pelaballs, and many others have created a live music scene. Submarino, Dioslepague, Todosantos, Domingo en llamas, and Cunaguaro Soul are considered cult bands of that decade.

=== 2010s ===
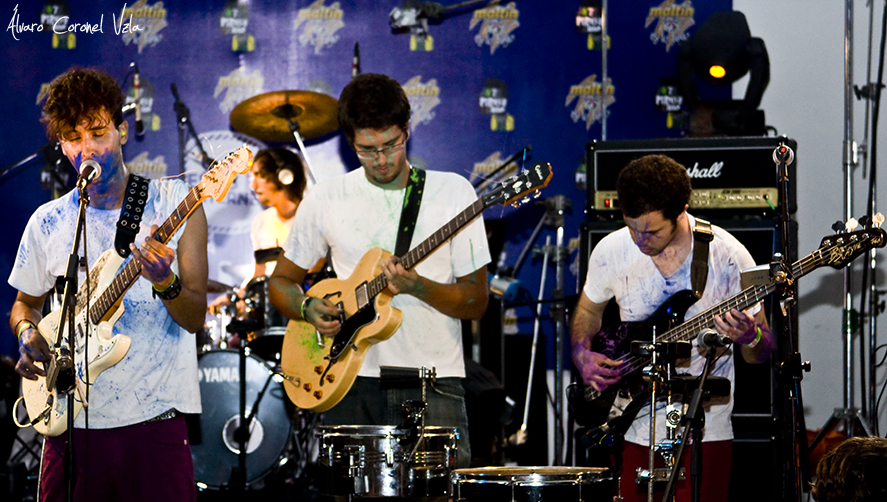
La Vida Bohème

The Venezuelan rock scene was re-energized. Charliepapa, Sr. Presidente, La pequeña revancha, Americania, Recordatorio, Los Mesoneros, Arawato, The Asbestos, Okills, etc. have emerged.

La Vida Bohème won the Latin Grammy Award for Best Rock Album with Será in 2013. During that decade, the Venezuelan bands Viniloversus (2010) with Si no nos mata, La Vida Bohème (2011) with Nuestra, and Charliepapa (2015) with Y/O were also nominated for the Latin Grammy Award for Best Rock Album. La Vida Bohème was nominated for the Latin Grammy Award for Best Rock Song with "Radio Capital" (2011) and "Hornos de Cal" (2013), Charliepapa with "Astrómetra" (2015), Caramelos de Cianuro with "Abismo" (2016), and Arawato with "Nirvana" (2019).

=== 2020s ===
Caramelos de Cianuro and Los Mesoneros were nominated for the Latin Grammy Award for Best Rock Album in 2021, with Control and Los Mesoneros Live desde Pangea, respectively, and La Vida Bohème was nominated with Diáspora Vol. 1 in 2024. Viniloversus was nominated for the Latin Grammy Award for Best Rock Song with "Control temporal" in 2024. The band Van Der Dijs gained tragic international fame after the 2026 earthquakes, in which all four of its members died.

== Venezuelan rock artists ==
- Los Impala
- Henry Stephen
- Vytas Brenner
- Arkangel
- Zapato 3
- Seguridad Nacional
- Caramelos de Cianuro
- Los Amigos Invisibles
- Los Mentas
- Desorden Público
- Sentimiento Muerto
- Dermis Tatú
- Culto Oculto
- Los Paranoias
- Los Gusanos
- Candy 66
- Verona
- Todosantos
- La Vida Bohème
- Atkinson
- Unos Panas Ahí
- The Asbestos
- La Vesper
- Los Mesoneros
