= List of Latin pop artists =

This is a list of Latin-pop artists from around the world, mainly musicians.

- Abel Pintos
- Adabel Guerrero
- Adrián Barilari
- Adriana Varela
- Airbag
- Alberto Cortez
- Alberto Hassan
- Alejandro Lerner
- Amanda Ledesma
- Amanda Miguel
- Amelita Baltar
- Andrés Ciro Martínez
- Angeles Balbiani
- Ariel Nan
- Ariel Rot
- Atahualpa Yupanqui
- Axel
- Baby Bell
- Bahiano
- Bandana
- Barbara Luna
- Beba Bidart
- Belen Scalella
- Benjamín Rojas
- Berta Singerman
- Brenda Asnicar
- Cacho Castaña
- Candela Vetrano
- Candelaria Molfese
- Carla Borghetti
- Carlos Acuna
- Charly Garcia
- Clara Alonso
- Claudio Basso
- Claudio O'Connor
- Coki Ramirez
- Coti Sorokin
- Cristina Altamira
- Cynthia Nilson
- Daniela Herrero
- Dante Spinetta
- Diego Torres
- Diego Verdaguer
- Dorismar
- Eladia Blazquez
- Enanitos Verdes
- Erica Garcia
- Fabiana Cantilo
- Facundo Cabral
- Facundo Gambandé
- Federico Aubele
- Fito Páez
- Flor
- Florencia Bertotti
- Franco Fagioli
- Gabriela Anders
- Gary
- Gastón Dalmau
- Gilda
- Gimena Accardi
- Gustavo Cerati
- Hilda Lizarazu
- Horacio Guarany
- Indio Solari
- Isol
- Javier Pantaleón
- Jorge Cafrune
- Juan Carlos Cáceres
- Juan Pedro Lanzani
- Juana Molina
- King Africa
- King Clave
- Lali Espósito
- Laura Natalia Esquivel
- Leo Dan
- Leo García
- Leonardo Favio
- Libertad Lamarque
- lidia Borda
- Lisandro Aristimuño
- Lola Ponce
- Lourdes
- Luciano Pereyra
- Luis Alberto Spinetta
- Luis Lima
- Luisana Lopilato
- Macarena Achaga
- Mambrú
- Marcela Kloosterboer
- Marcela Morelo
- Marcelo Álvarez
- María Cristina Kiehr
- María Eugenia Suárez
- María Fernanda Neil
- María Martha Serra Lima
- María Rosa Yorio
- Mariana Esnoz
- Mariana Fabbiani
- Martina Stoessel
- Mercedes Lambre
- Mercedes Sosa
- Micaela Vazquez
- Miguel Abuelo
- Milagros Flores
- Miranda!
- Moris
- Nelly Omar
- Néstor Fabián
- Nicolás Riera
- Nicolás Vázquez
- Oscar Palavecino
- Pablo Martínez
- Pablo Ruiz
- Palo Pandolfo
- Patricia Sosa
- Patricio Borghetti
- Pedro Aznar
- Piru Sáez
- Raúl Lavié
- Ricardo Iorio
- Roberto Goyeneche
- Rocio Igarzabal
- Rolabogan
- Romina Yan
- Rosita Contreras
- Sandra Mihanovich
- Sandro de América
- Sebastián Francini
- Sebastian Schneider
- Sobrenadar
- Sofia Reca
- Sol Rodriguez
- Soledad Pastorutti
- Suni Paz
- Susana Rinaldi
- Teen Angels
- Tita Merello
- Tormenta
- Valeria Gastaldi
- Valeria Lynch
- Vanesa Gabriela Leiro
- Vicentico
- Victor Heredia
- Victoria Maurette
- Virginia Da Cunha
- Virginia Luque
- Walter Olmos
- Yamila Cafrune
- Zaima Beleno

== Bolivia ==
- Azul azul
- Carlos Palenque
- Tarateño Rojas
- Luzmila Carpio
- Katia Escalera
- Nilo Soruco

== Brazil ==
- Anitta
- Rita Lee
- Cazuza
- Barão Vermelho
- Daniela Mercury
- Cássia Eller
- Ivete Sangalo
- Jota Quest
- Marisa Monte
- Os Tribalistas
- Paralamas do Sucesso
- Pato Fu
- Pitty
- Roberto Carlos
- Alexandre Pires
- Sandy & Junior
- Skank
- Titãs
- Wanessa Camargo
- Xuxa
- Kelly Key

== Chile ==
- Anita Tijoux
- Chancho en Piedra
- Cuchufleta
- Daniela Castillo
- De Saloon
- Denisse Malebrán
- Difuntos Correa
- DJ Méndez
- Francisca Valenzuela
- Glup!
- Javiera y los Imposibles
- Kudai
- La Ley
- Mon Laferte (a.k.a. Monserrat Bustamante)
- Los Jaivas
- Los Prisioneros
- Los Tetas
- Los Tres
- Luis Jara
- Myriam Hernández
- Nicole
- Saiko
- Supernova
- Tiro de Gracia
- Ximena Abarca

== Colombia ==
- Anasol
- Andrés Cepeda
- Bacilos
- Cabas
- Carlos Vives
- Carolina Márquez
- Charlie Zaa
- Ekhymosis
- Fanny Lú
- Fonseca
- Greeicy Rendón
- Inés Gaviria
- J Balvin
- Jorge Villamizar
- Juanes
- Karol G
- Karoll Márquez
- Lucas Arnau
- Maía
- Morat
- Maluma
- Naty Botero
- Poligamia
- San Alejo
- Sebastián Yatra
- Shakira
- Verónica Orozco

== Cuba ==
- Erick Brian Colon (member of CNCO)
- Adalberto Álvarez
- Addys Mercedes
- Albita
- Alfredo de la Fé
- Ángel Reyes
- Armando Peraza
- Arturo Sandoval
- Aylín Mújica
- Benny Moré
- Blanca Rosa Gil
- Camila Cabello
- Cándido Fabré
- Carlos Manuel Pruneda
- Carlos Varela
- Celia Cruz
- Celina González
- Christina Milian
- Chucho Valdés
- Compay Segundo
- Conchita Espinosa
- Cuban Link
- Cubanito 20.02
- Dámaso Pérez Prado
- Dave Lombardo
- David Calzado
- Didier Hernández
- Elena Burke
- Eliades Ochoa
- Emilio Estefan
- Ernesto Lecuona
- Fat Joe
- Francisco Aguabella
- German Nogueira Gomez
- Gilberto Velázquez
- Gloria Estefan
- Gonzalo Rubalcaba
- Guillermo Portabales
- Habana Abierta
- Harold Lopez Nussa
- Horacio Gutiérrez
- Hubert de Blanck

== Dominican Republic ==
- Richard Camacho (member of CNCO)
- Antony Santos
- Santaye
- Raulin Rodriguez
- Luis Vargas
- Martha Heredia
- Wason Brazobán
- Frank Reyes
- Aventura
- Anaís
- Pavel Núñez
- Joe Blandino
- Ramón Orlando
- Vicente Garcia
- Proyecto Uno
- Fernando Villalona
- Milly Quezada
- Eddy Herrera
- MDO
- Monchy y Alexandra
- Juan Luis Guerra
- Luis Días
- Toño Rosario
- Luny Tunes
- Johnny Ventura
- Sergio Vargas
- Xtreme
- Alih Jey
- Ophelia Marie
- Angela Carrasco
- Puerto Plata
- Eladio Romero Santos

== Ecuador ==
- Christopher Velez (member of CNCO)
- Mirella Cesa
- Pamela Cortes
- Gerardo
- Kiruba
- Fausto Miño
- Danilo Parra
- La Pandilla (Not to be confused with teen music group)
- Juan Fernando Velasco
- Julio Jaramillo

== El Salvador ==
- Álvaro Torres

== Guatemala ==
- Ricardo Arjona
- Shery
- Carlos Peña

== Honduras ==
- Quimera
- Ytterbium
- Banda Blanca

== Mexico ==
- Alejandro Fernández
- Alejandro Ibarra (Alex Ibarra)
- Aleks Syntek
- Alexander Acha
- Ana Gabriel
- Anahí
- Belanova
- Belinda
- Benny Ibarra
- Bibi Gaytán
- CD9
- Camila
- Cristian Castro
- Cynthia Rodriguez
- Diego Boneta
- Diego Schoening
- Dulce María
- Edith Márquez
- Eduardo Palomo
- Fandango
- Fey
- Flans
- Grupo Play
- Imanol
- Jeans
- Jesse y Joy
- Joel Pimentel (founding member of CNCO)
- Jorge Blanco
- José José
- Juan Gabriel
- Julieta Venegas
- Kabah
- Kairo
- Kalimba
- Leonel García
- Litzy
- Lorenzo Antonio
- Lu
- Lucero
- Lucía Méndez

== Nicaragua ==
- Luis Enrique

== Panama ==
- El General
- La Factoría
- Luci
- MDO

== Peru ==
- Daniela Lalita
- Gianmarco Zignago
- Líbido
- Mar de Copas
- Los Nosequien y Los Nosecuantos
- Pedro Suárez Vértiz

== Puerto Rico ==
- Bad Bunny
- Zabdiel De Jesús (member of CNCO)
- Chayanne
- Carlos Ponce
- Daddy Yankee
- Danny Rivera
- Dayanara Torres
- Don Omar
- Elvis Crespo
- Frankie Negrón
- Gilberto Santa Rosa
- Janina Irizarry
- Jenilca Giusti
- Jerry Rivera
- José Feliciano
- Kany García
- La Secta Allstar
- La India
- Luis Fonsi
- Yolandita Monge
- Manny Manuel
- Mary Ann Acevedo
- MDO
- Melina León
- Menudo
- Noelia
- Olga Tañón
- Obie Bermúdez
- Rauw Alejandro
- Ricky Martin
- Tito Nieves
- Toby Love
- Shalim Ortiz
- Sonya Cortés
- Calle 13
- Víctor Manuelle
- Wisin & Yandel
- Yaire
- Ednita Nazario
- Tommy Torres
- J Alvarez
- Farruko

== Spain ==
- Abraham Mateo
- Aitana
- Pablo Alborán
- Alaska
- Alejandro Sanz
- Álex Ubago
- Álvaro Soler
- Amaral
- Ana Belén
- Ana Guerra
- Amistades Peligrosas
- Azúcar Moreno
- Baccara
- Bebe
- Beatriz Luengo
- Chenoa
- Camilo Sesto
- D'NASH
- David Bisbal
- David Bustamante
- David Civera
- David DeMaría
- David Summers
- Duncan Dhu
- Enrique Iglesias
- Estopa
- Fangoria
- Idaira
- Julio Iglesias
- K-narias
- La oreja de Van Gogh
- La Quinta Estación
- Locomía
- Lorena
- Mayte Macanás
- Malú
- María Isabel
- Marta Sánchez
- Mecano
- Melody
- Miguel Bosé
- Miguel Rios
- Mocedades
- Monica Naranjo
- Natalia
- Nino Bravo
- Radio Futura
- Raphael
- Rebeca Pous Del Toro
- Rocío Dúrcal
- Rocío Jurado
- Son de Sol
- Victor Manuel

== United States ==
- Angelica
- Baby Bash
- Barrio Boyzz
- Becky G
- Camila Cabello
- Cardi B
- Chingo Bling
- Christina Aguilera
- Carlito Olivero
- Carlos PenaVega
- CNCO
- Demi Lovato
- Eydie Gorme
- Frankie J
- Gisselle
- Ha*Ash
- Jaci Velasquez
- Jencarlos Canela
- Jenni Rivera
- Jennifer Lopez
- Jennifer Peña
- J.D. Natasha
- Kumbia Kings
- Kumbia All Starz
- La Mafia
- Lani Hall
- Lilian Garcia
- Linda Ronstadt
- Los Super Reyes
- Marc Anthony
- Mayra Veronica
- Miami Sound Machine
- Nicky Jam
- Nydia Rojas
- Placido Domingo
- Pitbull
- Prince Royce
- Romeo Santos
- Selena
- Selena Gomez
- Sofia Carson
- Soraya
- Valeria Lynch
- Vikki Carr

== Uruguay ==
- Chocolate
- Jorge Drexler
- Natalia Oreiro

== Venezuela ==
- Danny Ocean (singer)
- Carlos Baute
- Voz Veis
- Franco De Vita
- Ricardo Montaner
- Mayré Martínez
- Guillermo Dávila
- Jeremías
- María Rivas
- Lila Morillo
- Oscar D'Leon
- Porfi Jiménez
- Ilan Chester
- Simon Diaz
- Desorden Público
- Los Amigos Invisibles
- Freddy Marshall
- Los Chamos
- Los Terricolas
- Caramelos de Cianuro
- Roque Valero
- Billo's Caracas Boys
- Felipe Pirela
- Chino y Nacho
- Los Melodicos
- Mirla Castellanos
- Kiara
- Karina
- Rudy La Scala
- Pablo Manavello
- José Luis Rodríguez "El Puma"
- Gerry Weil

== See also ==
- Lists of musicians
