= Fred Marshall =

Fred, Frederick or Frederic Marshall may refer to:

- Fred Marshall (American politician) (1906–1985), American politician
- Fred Marshall (British politician) (1883–1962), British politician
- Fred Marshall (American football) (born 1942), American football player
- Frederick Marshall (British Army officer) (1829–1900), British general
- Frederic Marshall (lawyer) (1839–1910), British barrister
- Frederick Marshall (politician) (1902–1975), Australian politician
- Frederick J. Marshall (1951–2023), American judge
- Frederic William Marshall (1721–1802), administrator and town planner in North Carolina
- Freddy Marshall (born 1959), heavy metal musician and songwriter

== See also ==
- Freddie Ray Marshall (born 1928), professor of economics
