= María Fernanda Neil =

Argentine actress, singer and model

- Born: October 19, 1982 (age 43); Buenos Aires, Argentina
- Other names: Fernanda Neil
- Occupations: Actress, Singer and Model
- Years active: 1998-2013
- Children: 1

María Fernanda Neil (born October 19, 1982) is an Argentine actress, singer and model.

== Early life and career ==
María Fernanda Neil was born on October 19, 1982, in Argentina. She appeared in the Argentine telenovela Chiquititas (1995), Verano del '98 (1998), Provócame (2001), Rebelde Way (2002), and El Refugio de los Sueños (2006).

After her participation in Chiquititas was over, Neil took a break off acting and began a career in modeling. In 2001, however, she returned to Argentine television, alongside Romina Yan, Puerto Rican singer Chayanne and Araceli González in Provócame, which was shown on English speaking countries as "Savage Attraction". Neil played Erica Villalobos Kent de Parisi in that soap opera. Provócame also became an international hit.

From 2002 to 2003, Neil was part of the cast of the youth television series Rebelde Way starring Camila Bordonaba, Luisana Lopilato, Benjamín Rojas and Felipe Colombo. Neil played Fernanda Peralta Ramos.

Neil worked in Floricienta, Doble Vida and concentrated on her modeling career.

In 2006, she played Fernanda Linares Pacheco, in the soap-apera called El Refugio. Neil, along with Francisco Bass, Piru Saez, Jorge Maggio and Belén Scalella, worked in this soap opera during one year it finished in December 2006 and had a group called Rolabogan, which was also part of the soap opera's theme. The second season of this soap opera was mentioned by Piru Saez and María Fernanda Neil would appear in it again.

In 2007, she was a participant in the reality television show Gran Hermano Famosos, where she was the show's finalist.

After appearing in La Ley Del Amor, she appeared in Gran Hermano Famosos, the Argentine version of Celebrity Big Brother.

== Life outside of acting ==
After the birth of Neil’s son Valentino in 2011, she retired from acting to focus on her family. In 2012, she opened a sex shop called By Jabba, where she sold sex toys and lingerie. She is also active on Instagram, where she has more than 35,000 followers and posts about topics including autism awareness, recycling, and well-being.

== Filmography ==
=== Television ===
Year	Title	Character	Channel
1998	Chiquititas	Martina Cuenca	Telefe
1999	Chiquititas	Fernanda	Telefe
2000	Verano del '98	Emily	Telefe
2001-2002	Provócame	Érica Villalobos Kent de Parisi	Telefe
2002-2003	Rebelde Way	Fernanda Peralta Ramos	Canal 9/América TV
2004	Floricienta	Jazmín	Canal 13
2005	Doble vida	Sagrario	América TV
2006	El Refugio	Fernanda Linares Pacheco	Canal 13
2006-2007	La ley del amor	Yuli	Telefe
2008	Don Juan y Su Bella Dama	Mayte	Telefe
2009	Dromo		América TV
2010	Alguien que me quiera	Tasha	Canal 13

=== Theater ===
Year	Title	Character	Director	Theater
1998	Chiquititas	Martina Cuenca	Cris Morena	Teatro Gran Rex
1999	Chiquititas	Fernanda	Cris Morena	Teatro Gran Rex
2002	Rebelde Way	Fernanda Peralta Ramos	Cris Morena	Teatro Gran Rex
2002-2004	Erreway	Herself	Cris Morena	
2004	La bella durmiente del bosque	Bella durmiente		Teatro Colón
2007	Fuimos todos			
2008	No somos santas		Gerardo Sofovich	Teatro Multitabaris COMAFI
2009	Confesiones de mujeres de 30		Lía Jelín	
2009-2010	Feliz caño nuevo	la Tana		Complejo Holiday Cinemas de Villa Carlos Paz
2010	Noctámbulo, un amor prohibido	Sol Lugosi	Jorge Mazzini	Broadway Theatre
2012-2013	Next	Lupe		

=== Television Programs ===
Year	Program	Channel	Notes
2007	Gran Hermano Famosos	Telefe	Participant

=== Movies ===
Year	Movie	Character	Director
2008	100% Lucha, la película	Anabelle	Juan Iribas
2008	Los Super Agentes, Nueva Generación		Daniel De Filippo
