= Archangel (disambiguation) =

Archangels are the second-lowest rank of angel.

Archangel or Arkangel may also refer to:

== Places ==
- Archangel (city) or Arkhangelsk, Russia
- Archangel Oblast or Arkhangelsk Oblast, a northern Russian province

== Media ==
=== Literature ===
- Archangel, a 1994 novel by Garry Kilworth
- Archangel, a 1995 novel by Paul Watkins
- Archangel (Shinn novel), a 1997 novel by Sharon Shinn
- Archangel (Harris novel), a 1999 novel by Robert Harris
- Archangel (Gibson comic), a 2017 graphic novel by William Gibson
- Ark Angel, the sixth book in the Alex Rider series by Anthony Horowitz

=== Film and television ===
- Archangel, the code name of Michael Coldsmith Briggs III in the 1980s television series Airwolf
- The Archangel, a 1969 Italian comedy film directed by Giorgio Capitani and starring Vittorio Gassman
- Archangel (1990 film), a 1990 Canadian comedy-drama film directed by Guy Maddin
- Archangel, a space warship in the 2002 series Mobile Suit Gundam SEED and the 2004 Mobile Suit Gundam SEED Destiny
- Archangel (2005 film), an adaptation of the novel by Robert Harris
- Arch Angels, a 2006 Japanese film based on the manga series Warau Michael
- "Arkangel" (Black Mirror), a 2017 episode from the series fourth season
- Archangel, working title of the 2026 American action film Ghost Soldier directed by William Eubank and starring Jim Caviezel
- Archangel, a 2026 American supernatural horror film directed by Bryan Edward Hill

=== Music ===
- Arcángel (born 1985), Dominican-American raised in Puerto Rico, singer-songwriter, rapper and actor
  - Arcángel & De La Ghetto, Reggaeton duo consisting of Austin "Arcángel" Santos and Rafael "De La Ghetto" Castillo
- Archangel (Kettama album), 2025
- Archangel (Two Steps from Hell album), 2011
- Archangel (Soulfly album), 2015
- "Archangel", a song by Amaranthe from the album Manifest
- "Archangel", a song by The Walker Brothers from the album Portrait
- "Archangel", a song by Burial from the album Untrue
- Arc Angel (band), rock band that was formed by musicians Jeff Cannata and Michael Soldan
- Arc Angels, a Blues rock supergroup formed in Texas in the early 1990s

=== Comics ===
- Archangel, the former alias of the Marvel Comics character Warren Worthington III

=== Video games ===
- Archangel (2002 video game), a 2002 action role-playing video game developed by Metropolis Software
- Archangel (2014 video game), a 2014 video game developed by Black Tower Studios
- Archangel (2017 video game), a 2017 VR game developed by Skydance Interactive
- Archangel, nom de guerre of the character Garrus Vakarian in the Mass Effect series
- Archangel, a weaponized satellite in the video game Crysis 3

== Other uses ==
- Archangel (operation), a British military operation in World War I
- SS Archangel, a ferry originally called SS St Petersburg
- Yellow Archangel, the common name of wildflower Lamium galeobdolon, a member of Lamiaceae
- Archangel pigeon, a breed of fancy pigeon
- Archangel, the code name of a series of aircraft designs by Lockheed such as the A-11 and A-12
- Arhangel, a Macedonian alternative rock band
- Arkangel (magazine), a British-based bi-annual animal liberation magazine
- Estadio Nuevo Arcángel, multi-use stadium in Córdoba, Spain

== See also ==
- Arkangel (disambiguation)
- Archangelos (disambiguation)
