= Cunaguaro Soul =

Venezuelan rock band

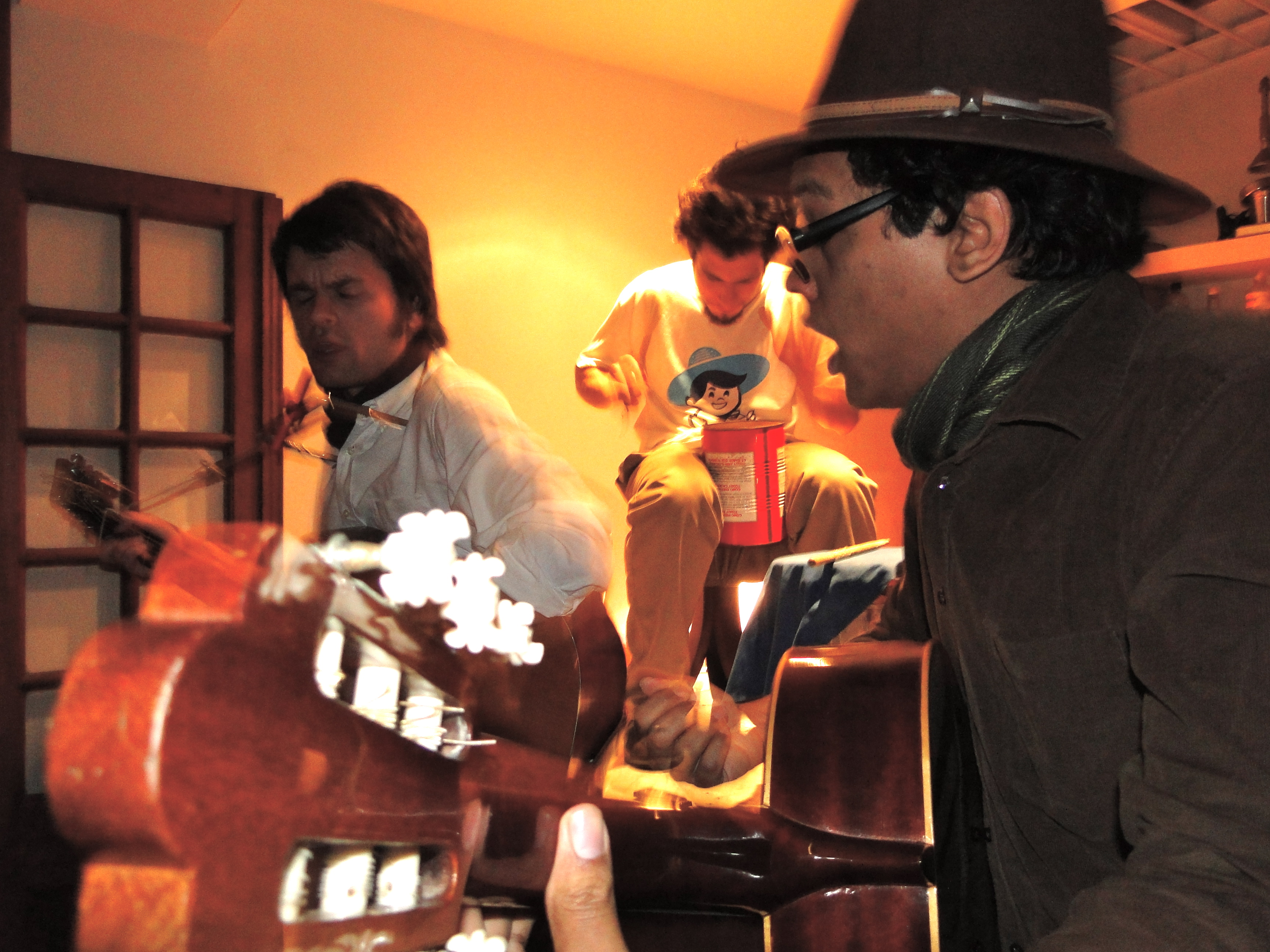
- Gustavo Guerrero (right).

Background information
- Origin: Caracas, Venezuela
- Genres: Rock
- Members: Gustavo Guerrero Miguel Arellano Rómulo Castillo Rašić

Cunaguaro Soul was a Venezuelan rock band formed in Caracas, composed of Gustavo Guerrero, Miguel Arellano, and Rómulo Castillo.

== History ==
In 2007, they released the live album Bienvenidos a este viaje, and the following year, their self‑titled debut album, Cunaguaro Soul.[2]

In 2009, they played at the Patio Maravillas in Madrid, Spain. That year, they were an invited band at the Festival Nuevas Bandas.

== Influence and musical style ==
The band encompassed genres such as rock, incorporating elements of soul, and jazz influences, also being considered experimental. They have been described as influenced by Dermis Tatú.

Vice wrote that Cunaguaro Soul was "the power trio that crowned him (Guerrero) as the greatest hope for rock in his country". El Diario wrote of them: "They are considered the most suggestive rock band on the Venezuelan music scene". They have also been described as a cult band.

== Discography ==
- Bienvenidos a este viaje (2007)
- Cunaguaro Soul (2008)

== See also ==
- Domingo en llamas
- Venezuelan rock
