= The Pelaballs =

Atkinson
- Origin: Valencia, Venezuela
- Genres: Punk, indie rock
- Years active: 2008-2017
- Past members: Jerry Vergara José Vicente Vergara Fernando Colombet

The Pelaballs was a Venezuelan punk and indie rock power trio formed in Valencia, active between 2008 and 2017.

== History ==
The band began as a series of jam sessions with improvised lyrics. They performed their first concert in 2008 alongside the group Los Mentas. The following year, they recorded their debut album, The Pelaballs Volumen 1.

In 2010, they participated in the Festival de Rock 100% Venezolano; in 2013, they were part of the Regional Tour of the Union Rock Show 2013, and were featured in the lineup of the Punto Fijo Rock Fest 2015, releasing their second album, M.M.X.V., in 2017.

The band has appeared on radio stations in Venezuela and the United Kingdom, performing a series of songs in 2016 for No es FM Radio in Caracas, and being part of the programming of MMH Radio in the United Kingdom in 2026. After the band's separation, bassist Fernando "El Niño" Colombet participated as an interviewee in the documentary series La capital del rock in 2024, about the development of the musical genre in Valencia during the 21st century.

== Members ==
- Jerry Vergara – vocals, guitar
- Fernando "El Niño" Colombet – bass guitar
- José Vicente Vergara – drums

== Discography ==
- The Pelaballs Volumen 1 (2009)
- M.M.X.V (2017)
