= Los Paranoias =

- Origin: Caracas, Venezuela
- Genre: Rock
- Years active: 2001-2013
- Past members: Luis Irán; Carlos Da Palma; Iván Gozón; Derwin Colls; Yunior Lobo

Los Paranoias was a Venezuelan rock band formed in Caracas, active between 2001 and 2013.

== History ==
Inspired by the name of an unreleased song by The Beatles and influenced by the sound of 1990s Britpop, the group was formed in Caracas in 2001, led by Luis Irán and composed with his brother Carlos Da Palma. They released the demo "Demente" in 2002 and recorded their album Aaah! Estos son Los Paranoias! with drummer David de Oliveira that same year, releasing it in 2005. The album cover references The Beatles' A Hard Day's Night. That year, they shared the stage with Jethro Tull at the Teatro Teresa Cultural Complex.

Their next album, Hey! Dónde están Los Paranoias?, was recorded with drummer Derwin Colls at Rafael Cadavieco's Sala de Máquinas studio (former drummer of Zapato 3), and was co-produced by him as well, being released in 2007. The singles "Sobre mí," "Prescripción," and "Algo" were promoted on MTV.

In 2008, they released the EP Leslie Sessions EP. The album Aquí fue, released in 2009, featured the incorporation of Iván Gozón as guitarist; the single "Acetaminofén" reached number one on Venezuela's Record Report Rock Pop chart and was among the top 10 most requested on MTV, along with "La máquina" and "Sin piedad." Around that time, they participated in the Movistar Música Festival, where R.E.M. and Travis also performed. Los Paranoias also presented the album at the 2010 Festival Nuevas Bandas.

After Gozón's departure, the band recorded their final album in 2012, titled Que se activen las alarmas, produced by Carlos Imperatori (former member of Dioslepague and Tumbador) and released the following year. The national tour was only half completed, as bassist Carlos Da Palma emigrated to the United Kingdom, which sealed the band's end. By 2019, Luis Irán had emigrated to the United States.

== Discography ==
- I. D. S. T. (2004)
- Aaah! Estos son Los Paranoias! (2005)
- Hey! Dónde están Los Paranoias? (2007)
- Aquí fue (2009)
- Que se activen las alarmas (2013)
