= Atkinson (band) =

Venezuelan rock band

- Origin: Caracas, Venezuela
- Genres: Rock
- Years active: 2008-2011
- Spinoff of: Sentimiento Muerto; Zapato 3
- Members: Wincho Schäfer; Rafael Cadavieco; Erik Aldrey

Atkinson was a Venezuelan rock supergroup originating from Caracas, formed by Wincho Schäfer, Rafael Cadavieco, and Erik Aldrey.

== History ==
Wincho Schäfer had been the bassist for the bands Sentimiento Muerto and PAN (both with Cayayo Troconis). Rafael Cadavieco was the drummer for Zapato 3, both of which were prominent bands. Erik Aldrey was a music producer and recording engineer for Los Amigos Invisibles. The trio formed the group in 2008.

In 2009, they released their debut album, Colonia para el alma, which achieved high positioning on national radio. The music video for its single "Así es como te amo" broke the record for views by a Latin American artist on Myspace.

Atkinson performed alongside the Irish band The Cranberries and played for 25,000 people as the opening act for the American band Aerosmith's 2010 concert in Venezuela.

After several months of recording, in 2011 they released their second album, Mota Foca, which featured political and social content. They presented it live on May 12 of that year and embarked on a national tour through Caracas, Maracaibo, Puerto La Cruz, Barquisimeto, Punto Fijo, Puerto Ordaz, and Mérida.

In November 2011, Wincho Schäfer announced his departure from the band, which subsequently led to the group's dissolution. Although Atkinson was short-lived, it is considered to have been a significant band in the history of Venezuelan rock.

== Members ==
- Wincho Schäfer – vocals, bass guitar
- Rafael Cadavieco – drums
- Erik Aldrey – guitar

== Discography ==
- Colonia para el alma (2009)
- Mota Foca (2011)
