= List of Rebelde Way characters =

The article contains a list of main characters in Rebelde Way (2002–2003), an Argentine telenovela. It was produced by Cris Morena. The band Erreway was formed during the development of this telenovela.

== Girls ==
=== Marizza Pía Spirito ===
Marizza Pía Spirito, later Andrade, is a main character of Rebelde Way and one of the four band members of Erreway. Born in Buenos Aires, July 24, 1987. She is portrayed by Camila Bordonaba.

She is a rebellious, extroverted, and sensitive teenager because her mother Sonia, a popular Argentinian vedette celebrity, never set any boundaries for her. To change this, Fabricio Spirito, Marizza's supposed father, forces her to attend the Elite Way School, a boarding school for privileged adolescents. She quickly becomes fond of her roommates Luján and Luna and as time passes she makes good friends with Manuel, Marcos, and Nico. Marizza forms a band with Manuel, Mía and Pablo.

She falls in love with Pablo and they start an on-off relationship. Marizza dates other boys to make Pablo jealous or get over him. She also befriends Mía and they become stepsisters when Sonia marries Franco, the father of her former enemy.

Marizza loves her mother hates the fact that she is always overshadowed by Sonia's beauty and fame. Most of the time the two of them are fighting, especially when Marizza finds out that her real father is Martín/Octavio Andrade, a new teacher at school.

==== 4 Caminos ====
At the beginning of the film 4 Caminos, Marizza and Pablo are not together. While Pablo tries to get Marizza's attention, she ignores him or gets mad at him. They become a couple again when Benito shows up at the hotel room they are staying in and presents tickets to Brazil. The two of them are the godfather and godmother of Candela, Mía and Manuel's daughter. Candela also says that Marizza became a famous singer.

=== Mía Colucci ===
Mía Colucci Cacéres is one of the main characters and a member of Erreway. Born in Buenos Aires, July 24, 1987. She is friends with Pablo and Marizza. she falls in love with Manuel in the first season, in season 2 she his girlfriend, She is the only child of famous fashion businessman Franco Colucci and his wife Marina. Mía was told that Marina died when she was just a baby, though she later finds out that her mother is alive and that she left Mía and Franco because she did drugs. She is portrayed by Luisana Lopilato.

Mía is the most popular and beautiful girl at Elite Way School. Because her father is a famous fashion businessman, she has many designer clothes. She also has the only room that she and her roommates use as a walk-in closet. Her best friends are Vico and Feli. She falls in love with Manuel at first sight, but she pretends to hate him. In the beginning of the first season she and Pablo consider dating so they can be the popular couple of the school. She is beautiful and mean, but she does not realize the latter.

An accomplished and talented dancer, she served as the school's sole choreographer prior to the arrival of Marizza. Known for her disciplined approach to maintaining a polished public image, she adheres to a strict diet, prioritizes regular exercise, and consistently refreshes her wardrobe. Her fashion sense is characterized by a refusal to repeat outfits; she frequently donates her previously worn clothing to students such as Luna and Vico. Each year, following the summer break, she hosts an "American fair," an event that serves both as a venue for donating her past wardrobe and as a platform to unveil her upcoming creative projects for the new school year.

Mía was originally Marizza's enemy, but they become friends and stepsisters when Franco marries Marizza's mother Sonia. She is in love with Manuel, but does not want to show it. At the end of season 1, Mía confesses her love to Manuel.

In season 2, Mía and Manuel are happy together, almost a perfect couple. However, Manuel drunkenly sleeps with Sabrina, and she breaks up with him. When Manuel loses his memory, Mía does everything to get his memory back. He remembers Pablo, but no one else. He eventually leaves for Mexico to see his family.

In the final episode, Manuel returns and begs Mía to forgive him and asks her to be together again. The two of them become a couple again.

==== 4 Caminos ====
In the film 4 Caminos (2004), Mía and Manuel are a couple that had parents. During the film, they have a baby, a girl named Candela. Mía discovers she has leukemia. The band returns to Buenos Aires because of Mía's therapy, but a short time later she dies.

=== Pilar Dunoff ===
Pilar Dunoff is the daughter of Principal Marcel Dunoff, the headmaster of Elite Way School. Her mother Claudia is also the professor of English language in Elite Way School. Because of that, she is disliked by most of the students. She is portrayed by Micaela Vázquez.

At the beginning of the series she writes an anonymous newspaper filled with gossip about her classmates (Marizza reveals that at the end of the first season, but she promises Pilar that she will not tell anyone). Guido also suspected her to be the writer of the newspaper, but could never prove it. At the beginning, she writes secret letters to Tomás, but later Guido finds out that Pilar was Tomás' secret admirer.

At the beginning of season one, Pilar pretends to date Tomás to help cover for him while he secretly dates Vico, who is in a relationship with Pablo.

Pilar dates Joaquín after he is dumped by Mía and Marizza. Her father supports her relationship with Joaquín and becomes their matchmaker, but they break up later.

In season two, Pilar dates Tomás. The divorce of their parents and relationship with Tomás makes her socialize a bit more, and she makes some friends in her class.

=== Luna Fernández ===
Luna Fernández received a scholarship as a very good student. She is calm, smart, romantic, quiet, always follow the rules, and also can do many things. She is portrayed by Georgina Mollo.

Mía once said that she was a very good manicurist and did better than her manicurist. She also fixes Marina's old frame. She has excellent grades and is liked by mostly everyone. Her aunt Sandra gets a job in Elite Way School's café. Luna concerns about her younger sister, Flor, who is sick – she cannot speak and hardly moves.

Luna's friends are Marizza, Luján, Mía, Manuel and almost everyone. She is a friend of Mía and Marizza, and because of this she sometimes became the victim of their fight because she cannot choose a side. She dates Tomás, but her true love is Nico. Their relationships has some problems, as Nico is a Jew and Luna is a Catholic. The two of them decide to marry in the end of the first season. They leave Elite Way School and go to the country with Luna's sister and aunt..

=== Luján Linares ===
Luján Linares is a skilled athletic tomboy. She was raised in foster care and her anonymous tutor pays for her scholarship. Luján tries to find out who he is. Her best friends are Marizza and Luna, later Laura. Marizza and Luján are almost the same: both are explosive and impulsive. She is portrayed by Jazmín Beccar Varela.

Luján is tormented by Blas, the school prefect. Luján hates him because of it, but Blas just wanted to make her a stronger person who can take care of herself. Luján finds out that he is her tutor and brother. Blas became her tutor after their father died. Blas dies in a car crash.

Luján is in love with Marcos. They become a couple in season one and break up in season two. In the final episode, she admits her feelings for him and they reconcile. Sonia and Franco adopt Luján, making her Marizza and Mía's sister.

=== Victoria Paz ===
Victoria "Vico" Paz received a scholarship for Elite Way School and is known there as the "ultimate playgirl". She was the target of Logia who destroyed all her clothes. Vico is friends with Mía and Feli, even they have fights. She is portrayed by Victoria Maurette. Mía likes to say that Vico is her "most successful project".

In season two she dates Rocco. She has many problems with her troubled father, who demanded money from her for a long time. At one point he was being hunted by the police; Vico and Rocco help him escape to the Argentinean mountains. Vico and Rocco partner together, writing and singing songs. In the end they leave together in order to live their musical dreams.

=== Felicitas Mitre ===
Felicitas "Feli" Mitre is a rich girl. Her mother is an ex-fashion model, and does not like her because she is fat. Because of her body shape, she has problems with dating. She has bulimia. She is portrayed by Ángeles Balbiani.

At the end, she becomes pregnant with Lalo's child.

=== Laura Arregui ===
Laura Arregui is as same as Luna: calm, smart, quiet, and always follow the rules. She has excellent grades and is liked by mostly everyone. She is portrayed by Mariana Seligmann. Her best friends are Marizza and Luján and she cares for her sister Lola. At the end, Laura dates Guido.

=== Dolores Arregui ===
Dolores "Lola" Arregui is Laura's younger sister. They later find out that Lola was adopted. At the end, she leaves to find her biological mother. She tries to be a rebel, like Marizza, to become attractive to Pablo. She is portrayed by Lis Moreno.

=== Sol Rivarola ===
Sol Rivarola is a rich beautiful girl. She is portrayed by Inés Palombo. She is the leader of Top Group, a group she made with Pilar, Fernanda, and Belén to rule the school and compete Mía's group (with Feli and Vico). Her dream is to be a fashion model, which her parents think is not a good career. She dates Blas.

=== Augustina Laumann ===
Agustina Laumann is a younger girl than the main characters. She is portrayed by Paola Salustro. At the end, she dates Francisco.

=== Fernanda Peralta Ramos ===
Fernanda Peralta Ramos is a wealthy side character portrayed by María Fernanda Neil. In the second season she becomes part of England's nobility because her mother married an aristocrat. She dates Tomás, Guido, Marcos and flirts with Manuel.

=== Belén Menéndez Pacheco ===
Belén Menéndez Pacheco is a wealthy side character portrayed by Belén Scalella. Sol says she is a little bit popular.

=== Sabrina Guzmán ===
Sabrina Guzmán is the band's manager in season two. She is portrayed by Gimena Accardi. She falls in love with Manuel and does everything to split up Mía and Manuel. After Mía and Manuel break up, Sabrina temporarily becomes Manuel's girlfriend.

== Boys ==
=== Pablo Bustamante ===
Pablo Bustamante is the youngest son of Sergio Bustamante and Mora Ortiz. Born in Buenos Aires, March 22, 1987. He is portrayed by Benjamín Rojas. His father Sergio is the mayor of Buenos Aires and abuses him mentally and physically. In addition, Sergio always compares him to his older brothers who are living abroad, and does not approve of Pablo being in a band because he is worried that it will affect his political image.

Pablo is the most popular boy in Elite Way School. His best friends are Guido, Tomás, and later Manuel. He is also a rebel in his own way due to the fact that he plays music. At the beginning of the series Pablo cannot stand Marizza as they are too different and keep arguing all the time. They eventually help each other in many situations and they start to develop feelings for one another.

Pablo plays the guitar and writes some songs for the band Erreway. He writes the love song "Dos Segundos" which is inspired by Marizza. Marizza and Pablo pretend to be a couple for a short while so that Pablo can play in the band without his father's knowledge. In one episode, after Nacho was discovered, Marizza told the school's café waitress Cata to play Pablo's song "Mi Vida". She finds out that Pilar told her friend, the writer of the newspaper, about Nacho. She tells Sergio that Tomás sang the song, not Pablo. Pablo gets angry at her because he thinks that Marizza forced Tomás to lie. When Tomás tells Pablo that Marizza did it to help him, Pablo is touched and a little confused because Marizza helped him. Near the end, Pablo shows Marizza that he does not want to be his father's puppet and she begins to realize and accept that she is in love with him. In the last episode they reconcile when Pablo finally stands up to his father.

==== 4 Caminos ====
In the film 4 Caminos, Marizza and Pablo are not together because, according to Marizza, he is womanizer. During the movie, they have many fights but become again a couple towards the end. Pablo wants to get Marizza's attention, but Marizza always ignores him or gets mad because she thinks he only wants to get her in bed and or wants to be with other girls. They kissed when Benito showed up in the hotel room with tickets to Brazil. Pablo and Marizza are the godparents of Mía and Manuel's daughter Candela. In the end, Candela says that Pablo becomes a famous producer.

=== Manuel Aguirre ===
Manuel Aguirre is a Mexican boy. Born in Mexico, January 8, 1985. He is portrayed by Felipe Colombo. He wants to avenge his father's suicide, which he believes was Franco Colucci's fault, but falls in love with Franco's daughter, Mía. His best friends are Nico, Marcos, Marizza, and later Pablo. He has problems with Logia (elite group of students who try to expel students with scholarships) and he tries to expose Logia. He was the first student that tries to face Logia, instead of running away by dropping out of school. Manuel finds out that his father's death is not Franco's fault and he gives up his revenge. He becomes Mía's boyfriend, and they go to the Galapagos Islands. Mía wants to preserve her virginity. After a lot of drinking, Manuel cheats on her with the new manager of Erreway, Sabrina. Mía and Manuel break up, but Manuel tries to win her love back. Manuel finds out he is ill, and he must undergo an operation. He loses his memory afterwards. He remembers Pablo, Marizza, his family, and Sabrina, but not Mía. He goes home to Mexico and gets all his memories back. In the end, Manuel comes back to Elite Way School. He asks Mía to forgive him and if she wants to be his girlfriend again. She says "yes", and they reconcile. Manuel plays the electric guitar in public, usually at the club.

==== 4 Caminos ====
In 2004 film 4 Caminos, Mía and Manuel are a couple. During the film, they have a baby girl and name her Candela. Candela, narrating this story, says that Manuel works in films.

=== Guido Lassen ===
Guido Lassen is one of Pablo's best friends, along with Tomás. He is portrayed by Diego Mesaglio. He is one of the rowdiest boys in Elite Way but a supportive friend. Pablo and Guido were not close at first, but because Pablo had a huge fight with Tomás (who was secretly dating Vico), Guido becomes his best friend. After Pablo reconciles with Tomás, Guido becomes best friends with him, too. During the second half of season one it was revealed that Guido, who values other people's opinions a lot, was a member of the Logia because they threatened to tell everyone that his family was not always wealthy, due he is the son of a family of butchers and is often ashamed of them. Even though he helped his classmates stop the Logia in the end, he was temporarily expelled from school.

He once pretended to like Feli as a favor to Mía and in return he thought that Mía would become his girlfriend.

=== Tomás Ezcurra ===
Tomás Ezcurra is Pablo's best friend and a close friend to Guido. He is portrayed by Jorge Maggio. He is very supportive to his friends. In some episodes, Tomás willingly takes the blame so that Pablo does not get punished. Tomas is somewhat shy, and admits to having trouble making friends because of it. He is the son of a rich business man in Buenos Aires. In the end, he dates Pilar, the daughter of the school principal.

=== Marcos Aguilar ===
Marcos Soria Aguilar is a close friend of Manuel and Nico. He is portrayed by Diego García. He secretly admires Marizza but is too shy to admit it to her. Marizza dates him temporarily to make someone else jealous and to make him more confident. He almost always listens to Marizza advice. Because of her advice he went on a total makeover that turned him from a nerd to a cool guy.

His parents are rich, but he feels his parents do not care for him. His brother, who was murdered, was once a member of Logia. He tried to enter Logia, to find out things about them. Those of the Logia realized Marcos's intentions and hurt him. In the end he dates Luján.

=== Nicolás Provenza ===
Nicolás "Nico" Provenza is a friend of Manuel and Marcos. He is portrayed by Guillermo Santa Cruz. He is a scholar of Elite Way School and one of the targets of the Logia. He is the only Jewish student in the school and hides his identity to avoid being discriminated by the Catholic student body; his identity is eventually revealed. He is one of the first persons to know about the band Erreway and he once managed the band. He loves Luna but has trouble maintaining their relationship due to their religious differences. At the end of the first season, they marry and leave Elite Way School and go to the country with Luna's sister and aunt.

=== Rocco Fuentes Echagüe ===
Rocco Fuentes Echagüe came in 2003 as the new fourth year student. He is portrayed by Piru Sáez. He always carries his camera. He loves punk music and fashion, which his classmates find strange. During his high school year he is confused about his sexuality. Rocco is in love with Vico and by the end of the series they are a couple. In the final episode, he toasts to the planet Earth, animals, and plants. He loves to help his friends and considers himself as a pacifist.

=== Francisco Blanco ===
Francisco Blanco appeared in the second season of the series and is portrayed by Francisco Bass. He is Tomas' cousin of northern Argentina. He came to Elite Way School with a scholarship as an athlete even if he did not pass his test because Dunoff wanted him for his athletic abilities. He pretends to go out with Lola as a favor to Laura. He ends up with Augustina at the end of the series.

=== Diego Urcola ===
Diego Urcola is a rich student of Elite Way School and belongs to a family of famous lawyers and judges. He is portrayed by Diego Child. In season one, he pretended to be Luján's boyfriend to make confuse Marcos. In season two, he has a relationship with Marizza, but they break up. After that, Diego always wants to help Marizza when she is confused or when she needs help.

=== Joaquín Arias Parrondo ===
Joaquin Arias Parrondo is the new student in Elite Way School in season one and is portrayed by Gastón Grande. He later becomes friends with other students in the school and has a relationship with Marizza and Mía at the same time. He also dates Pilar. He has a rich family background and is good in sports especially hang gliding. He was disliked by many of the students due to his boastful acts, and is eventually expelled after being involved in a drug incident.

=== Nachito ===
Nacho is the younger brother of the guy who stabbed and robbed Pablo in the community area. He is portrayed by Agustín Sierra. He serves as a witness with the letter sent by the journalist Néstor Montero as evidence to Mayor Bustamante's plot against the land of the community people. In later episodes of season one he becomes close to Marizza, Luján, and Luna because they took care of him while they hide his existence from the school.

=== Javier Alanis ===
Javier Alanis is the son of Sergio's girlfriend, Pablo's step brother, and is portrayed by Mariano Bertolini. He is in love with Marizza and stops at nothing to become her boyfriend; because of this he and Pablo become enemies. Javier frequently interferes in Pablo and Marizza's relationship. He is an antagonist in season 2.

== Adults ==
=== Sonia Rey ===
Sonia Rey is Marizza's mother and one of the most popular celebs in Argentina. She is portrayed by Catherine Fulop. She is very beautiful, charismatic, and easily gets attention, which makes her daughter Marizza somewhat jealous because her mother gets more attention than her. Sonia overprotects her daughter, although unlike Mía, Marizza is not very fond of her mom always getting cuddly around her and tends to shun her off.

Sonia falls in love with Franco, and the two of them adopt Luján, Marizza's best friend.

=== Santiago Mansilla ===
Santiago Mansilla is the new professor of ethics and philosophy. He is portrayed by Fernán Mirás. He thinks that morals are more important than math, history, or science. When he was younger, he had a wife and child, but they died in a car accident in the USA. Mansilla was judged for this crime and had to return in Argentina. At the end of season one, he proposes to Renata and the two of them leave the school to open their own school for poor kids.

=== Franco Colucci ===
Franco Colucci is one of the most famous fashion businessmen in Latin America. He is portrayed by Martín Seefeld. He has no time for his only child, Mía, and sends her to Elite Way School to get good education. Manuel works for him, who Franco feels is the son he never had. Franco feels some remorse for overprotecting Mía and spoiling her in the process.

Franco had problems with the rest of the Colucci family because of his marriage to Marina Cacéres, a rock musician. Marina did drugs, so she left Franco and Mía. Franco falls in love with Sonia and the two of them get married. When Marina returns, Franco tells Mía the truth. In the end, Sonia and Franco adopt Luján, one of Marizza's best friends.

=== Sergio Bustamante ===
Sergio Bustamante, Pablo's father, is the mayor of Buenos Aires. He is portrayed by Boy Olmi. Bustamante is the antagonist of the story. He does not like Marizza for dating Pablo because he thinks she is beneath him. He kicks Mora out of Pablo's life when Mora stood up for her son and tells Pablo that she left them.

He takes joy in torturing Pablo and embarrasses him in any given chance. He owns exactly 51% of Elite Way School. He always gets what he wants at any cost: for example, he pays a prostitute, Paola, to sleep with Pablo so he could lose his virginity and fall in love with her. The relationship is short-lived after he finds out why she met him. Pablo develops a hatred for his dad and eventually, with the help of Matias (the art teacher), he cuts loose.

In the end, Bustamante is arrested for corruption.

=== Marcel Dunoff ===
Marcel Dunoff is the long-suffering school principal and father of Pilar, and is portrayed by Arturo Bonin. Although he portrays a model of disciplined and honest person, he can be bribed by someone as powerful as Mayor Bustamante. He is very strict when it comes to Pilar. He used to have a relationship with Marizza's mother Sonia Rey, which is why he allows Marizza to attend Elite Way School.

=== Matías Miranda ===
Matías Miranda is the new art professor in Elite Way School and is portrayed by Federico D'Elia. He appears in season two after Martín Andrade leaves. He spent many years teaching in Spain. At first, the kids (especially Marizza and Pablo) do not like him because they were used to Andrade and Miranda is very strict. He becomes the students' guardian: he helps Luján face Blas' death, Felicitas with her pregnancy, Laura with her sister Lola and the situation with Lola's two mothers, and help and encourages Pablo to confront his father. In the final episode, he gives a job for the class – to prepare for the ceremony for the end of the school year. He is named special education worker and gains acceptance from all the kids.

=== Martín Andrade ===
Martín Andrade is the real father of Marizza and is portrayed by Miguel Ángel Cherutti. Marizza was told that her father is Fabrizio Spirito. In season two, he comes back as Octavio the art professor in Elite Way school and Marizza finds out the truth. After some time she accepts her father. He is a lot like Marizza, a rebel and a free spirit. He supports Marizza's relationship with Pablo.

=== Blas Heredia ===
Blas Heredia (real name Juan Fara) is the new school prefect and is portrayed by Pablo Heredia. He was hired so he can take a look at Luján. He was her secret tutor. Luján helped his father Ricardo Fara hide from the police when she was little. He is very rich and he decides to be a financial supporter for the girl. Blas has a huge crush on Mía and does not like Manuel. Mía and Blas date, but she breaks up because of Manuel. Blas wants to take revenge on both of them.

Blas' first care is Luján. He wants to make her a strong and responsible person who can take care of herself. Luján hates him because she believes he just likes to torture her. In the end, he is involved in a heavy car accident. Luján visits him in hospital and Blas tells her that he loves her like a sister before he dies.

=== Sandra Fernández ===
Sandra Fernández is Luna's aunt and is portrayed by Susana Ortiz. When Luna becomes a student of Elite Way School, Sandra gets a job in the school's café. She leaves her job and goes to the country with Luna, Nico, and Luna's sister Flor.

=== Marina Cacéres Colucci ===
Marina Cacéres Colucci is Mia's mother and is portrayed by Patricia Viggiano. When she was young, she was a musician but left show business when she met Franco and married him. After giving birth to Mía, she leaves Mía and Franco to enter drug rehabilitation. Mía was told that Marina died.

Marina returns and wants to tell Mía the truth. Franco tells Mía the truth and she wants to meet her mother no matter what Franco says. Mía and Marina meet and become closer and Mía forgives Franco. At one point, Mía wants to live with her mother, but Marina refuses because she is still insecure about the drugs.
