= Daniela Herrero =

Musical artist (born 1985)

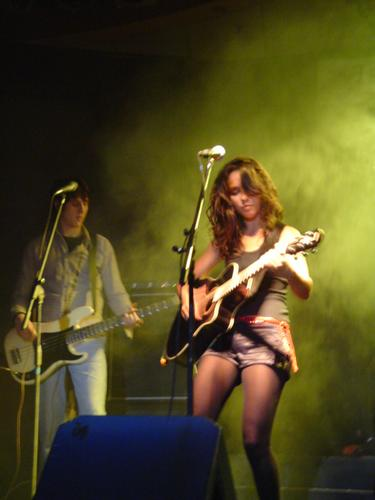
- Born: Daniela Laura Herrero; August 19, 1985 (age 41); Berazategui, Buenos Aires Province, Argentina
- Occupations: Actress; Singer
- Years active: 2001–present
- Children: 1
- Musical career
- Genre: Pop rock
- Instruments: Vocals; Guitar
- Labels: Sony Music; PopArt Music; DH Records

Daniela Laura Herrero (born August 19, 1985) is an Argentine Pop rock singer, songwriter and actress. She opened for Avril Lavigne on her Argentine segment of the Bonez Tour (2005).

== Discography ==
- Daniela Herrero (2001)
- No Voy A Mentirte (2003)
- El Espejo (2005)
- Altavoz (2010)
- Madre (2012)
- En Un Segundo (2015)

== Videos ==
- "Solo tus canciones"
- "Demasiado"
- "Cada vez"
- "Fuera de mi tiempo"
- "Como algo más"
- "Adoquines"
- "Sé"
- "Silencio"
- "Juntos a la par"
- "Hacerte bien"
- "En un segundo"
- "Las estrellas"

== Awards ==
- 2002, Nominee, Los Premios MTV Latinoamérica for Best New Artist – South
- 2004, Premios Carlos Gardel award for Best Female Album

== See also ==
- List of Latin pop artists
