= Los Impala =

Los Impala was a Venezuelan rock band formed in the city of Maracaibo in 1959, considered one of the pioneers of the genre in Venezuela.

== History ==
The band was formed in 1959. Its original lineup included Henry Prado on piano, Gilberto Urdaneta on bass, and Servando Alzatti on drums.

The band appeared on Renny Ottolina's television program in 1962. Some historians consider that Ottolina's support was decisive for their success.

In 1963, members of the defunct Zulian groups Los Flippers, Los Impala, and Los Tempest formed a new group, comprising former Flippers: Francisco Belisario (bass and vocals), Henry Stephen (bass and vocals), Nerio Quintero (drums), Edgar Quintero (guitar), and Omar Padauy (drums).

In 1966, Stephen left to begin his solo career, supported by Renny Ottolina, and was replaced by Rudy Márquez.

In September, they traveled to Europe and went on a tour, where they passed through England, France, Italy, the Netherlands, Denmark, and Portugal. The band remained there until late 1969. They shared the stage with The Hollies and The Rolling Stones; Los Impala jammed with Bill Wyman, bassist of the latter band.

The group returned to Venezuela in 1970, where they disbanded after appearing on the television program El Show del Pueblo on Venevisión on January 3 of that year.

In 1991, they reunited for a concert in Maracaibo.

== Band members ==
- Henry Stephen - vocals
- Servando Alzati - guitar
- Edgar Quintero - guitar
- Nerio Quintero - bass
- Pedro Alfonso - piano
- Omar Padauy - drums

== Discopraphy ==
- Conozca a Los Impala (1963)
- Los Impala (1964)
- Nuevamente Los Impala (1965)
- Impala '66 (1966)
- Los Impala y su música (1966)
- The Impala and Their Music (1966)
- Los Impala en Europa (1968)
- Los Impala (1968)
- Impala Syndrome (1969)
- Regresan Los Impala (1975)
