= La Compañía del Tango Nómada =

La Compañía del Tango Nómada is a project in world music in Mexico City, which was created by Carla Borghetti and Iván Peñoñori. There are collaborations of musicians from many countries and different experiences, with performances festivals throughout Mexico. The music covered includes tango, jazz, blues, bolero and cabaret.

It was founded in 2005.
