= Zapato 3 =

Venezuelan rock band

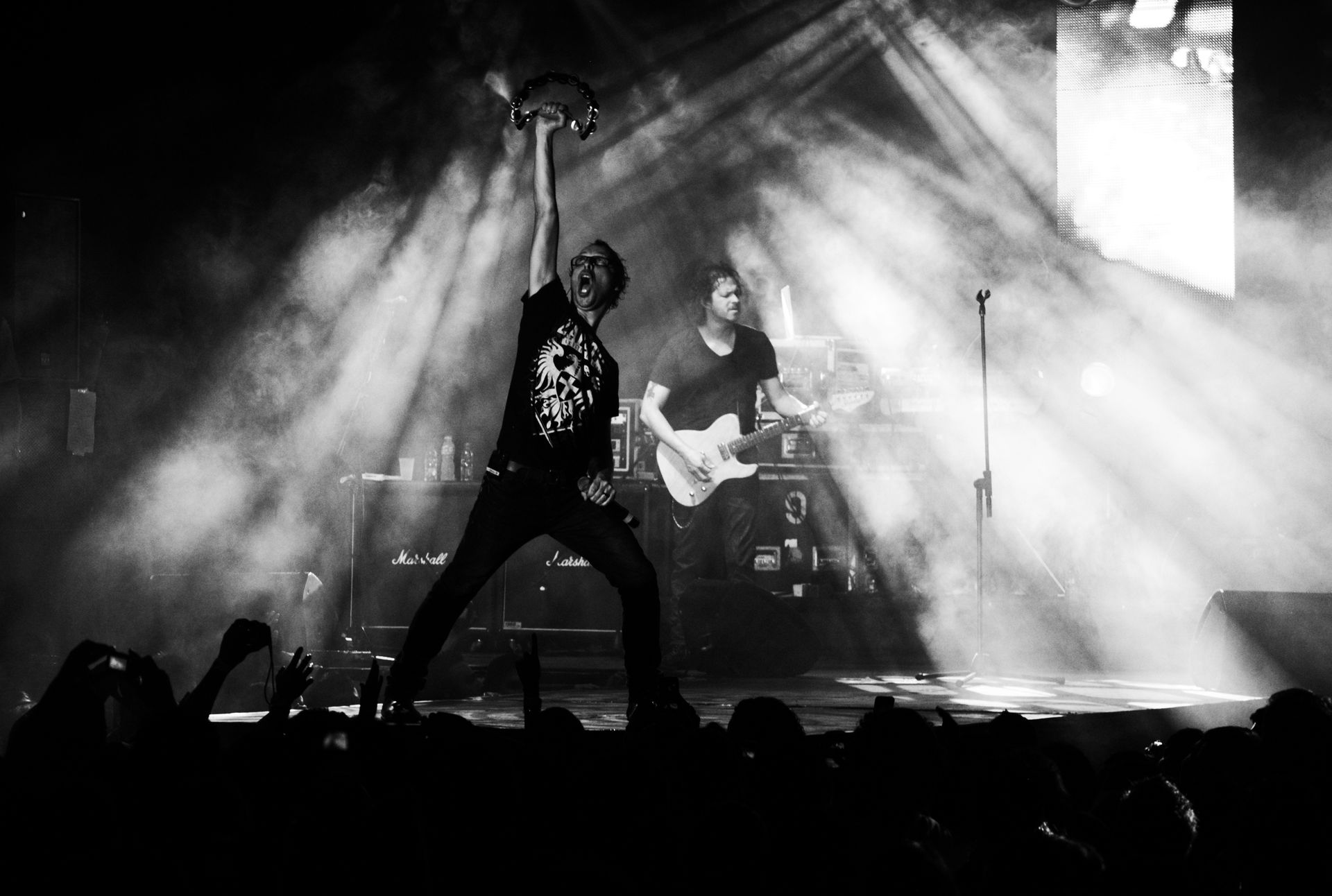
- Zapato 3

Background information
- Origin: Caracas, Venezuela
- Spinoffs: Atkinson
- Members: Carlos Segura; Rudy Pagliuca; Fernando Batoni; Jaime Verdaguer; Darío Adames
- Past members: Álvaro Segura; Rafael Cadavieco; Diego Márquez

Zapato 3 is a Venezuelan rock band formed in Caracas in 1983, historically led by brothers Carlos Segura (vocalist) and Álvaro Segura (guitar and backing vocals), and Fernando Batoni (bass). It was one of the most prominent bands in Venezuela in the 1990s.

== History ==
=== 1980s ===
Fernando Batoni, founding member of the band, related that the origin of Zapato 3 can be traced back to around 1983. He relates that he, along with his friend and neighbor, and also founding member of the group, Javier Avellaneda "Vieja," formed a miniteca (sound system to liven up parties) called Epsilon.

=== 1990s ===
In 1989, their first album appeared, called Amor, furia y languidez, signed by the independent label Grabaciones Clandestinas of broadcaster and journalist Eugenio Miranda. The band banned that album from the digital market because they were not satisfied with the result.

They signed a contract with the Venezuelan record label Sonográfica and released their second album, Bésame y suicídate, in 1991, produced by Durban Laverde, which sold 60,000 copies in the first three months. They were the national act chosen to open the first show of the Argentine band Soda Stereo that year at the Poliedro de Caracas.

In 1993, Diego Márquez left the group, so he was replaced by Rafael Cadavieco. Additionally, Jaime Verdaguer (from the band Radio Clip) joined on keyboards. That same year, they recorded Separación, also produced by Laverde.

In 1995, they released Cápsula para volar with Polygram, their debut on an international record label, recorded in Mexico. This album included a cover of "Vampiro," by Seguridad Nacional, and opened the doors for them to appear on MTV.

In 1998, Cadavieco left the group and was replaced by César Domínguez, who played on the recording of the album Ecos punzantes del ayer and on the following tour. This album was mixed by their former drummer Diego Márquez and featured the participation of Yátu, from Seguridad Nacional.

=== 2000s ===
In 2000, after multiple conflicts, the Segura brothers, César Domínguez, and Jaime Verdaguer left the group, which marked the end of the band in 2004. The members settled in the United States for political reasons around this time.

In 2009, a countdown appeared on the group's official page that ended on 10/10/10. In an interview conducted on October 10, 2010, on the radio station La Mega 107.3 FM during the program Fabricado Acá, Fernando Batoni, Rafael Cadavieco, Diego Márquez, Álvaro Segura, and Jaime Verdaguer announced that there was indeed a tour planned for those dates, but that the proposal made to them in the end did not convince them. However, they did not close the possibility of a return. "Conditions just have to be met," said Batoni, who spoke again for the first time in ten years with the Segura brothers in that interview, the same night on which their first reunion would have taken place.

=== 2020s ===
On February 16, 2022, the death of the band's drummer, Diego Márquez, was announced; according to reports from the group, he suffered from acute depression and decided to end his life. The instrumentalist had been residing in Switzerland for a couple of years.

In 2025, Álvaro Segura announced his departure from Zapato 3, so musician and producer Rudy Pagliuca (member of Malanga) took his place as guitarist.

== Discography ==
- Amor, furia y languidez (1989)
- Bésame y suicídate (1991)
- Separación (1993)
- Cápsula para volar (1995)
- Ecos punzantes del ayer (1999)
- La última cruzada live (2014)

== Bibliography ==
- Eugenio Miranda, Zapato 3: una fantástica historia de amor y aventura, Fondo Editorial Letras, 1999
- Guarache, Una Idea Muy Obscena. Ediciones B 2015
