= Henry Stephen (musician) =

Venezuelan rock musician and actor (1941–2021)

Henry Augustus Stephen Pierre (15 July 1941 – 5 April 2021) was one of the earliest Venezuelan proponents of rock and roll music.

== Biography ==
Henry Stephen was born in Cabimas, Zulia state, Venezuela. He once belonged to the "Los Impala" music group, and later became a solo artist with the 1969 hit song "Limón, Limonero". In 1974, RCA Records awarded him a Gold record for selling one million copies of the song.

Later in his career, he became an actor in Venezuelan telenovelas.

Stephen died from COVID-19 in Caracas on 5 April 2021, during the COVID-19 pandemic in Venezuela.

== See also ==
- Venezuelan rock
