= Javier Pantaleón =

Argentine singer

Javier Pantaleón (1941–1978) was an Argentine singer.

Born in La Quiaca, he was a founding member of the legendary Argentine folkloric group, Los Cantores del Alba.

== Author and coauthor of songs ==
- "Tocamelo a chacarera" (chacarera)
- "To my Quiaca" (takirari)
- "Chaya drunk" (chaya)
- "I regret mataco" (air bailecito)
- "Counterpoints in bagualas" (baguala)
- "Let there be" (bolero)
- "Verses of a student" (serenade)
- "I am the singer of the dawn" (poem-song)
- 'Weeping' (waltz)
- "This Christmas Without You" (waltz)
- "Skip sings" (baguala)
- "Pantaleon the bagualero" (baguala)
- "My years of love" (serenade)
- "The moment you leave" (bolero)
- "Girl, you're in love" (serenade)
- "Letter to a bride" (serenade)
- "From carnival guard" (bailecito)
- "To my Skip linda" (samba)
- 'Girl Animaná "(baguala)
- "The penalty in bloom" (bailecito)
- "We are not two" (Inca dance)
- "Without you there is no sun" (serenade)
- "I feel guilty" (serenade)
- "Concerto in solitude" (serenade)
- "Not anymore this loneliness" (serenade)
- "The love that I breathe" (serenade)
- "This verse is for you" (serenade)
- "Serenade for a flower
