= Los Mentas =

Venezuelan rockabilly band

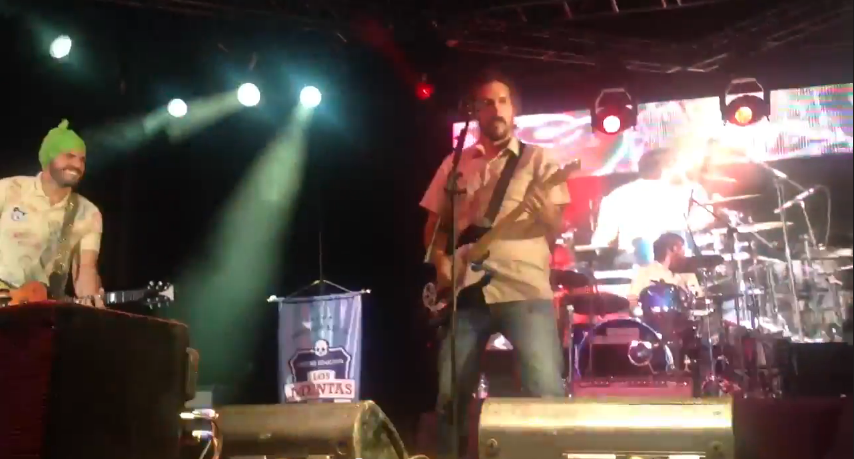
- Los Mentas

Background information
- Origin: Caracas, Venezuela
- Genres: Rockabilly
- Years active: 1998–present
- Spinoffs: La Pequeña Revancha
- Members: Juan Olmedillo; Carlos Aray; Héctor Paredes; Richard Blanco; Luis "Droopy" Pulido

Los Mentas is a Venezuelan rockabilly and punk band formed in Caracas in 1998. Their lyrics are often infused with dark humor.

== History ==
Los Mentas were formed in Caracas in 1998 and won the Festival Nuevas Bandas the following year. In 2000, they released their debut album, Taguara's Forever, and were invited to perform at the Rock al Parque festival in Colombia. By 2004, the quartet had put out Masacre en el Pin 5, whose single "Zombies en la morgue" was accompanied by an animated video that aired on MTV Latin America.

Their fourth studio album, Sopa, seco y jugo, arrived in 2008, the same year they played at the Vive Latino festival in Mexico. Two years later, they shifted toward a punkier sound with U. E. L. M. (Unidad Educativa Los Mentas), and in 2014 they released their sixth LP, Dios, El Diablo y El Dinero.

In 2015, the band returned to the Rock al Parque stage. More recently, they issued El Museo de los Pillos (2022), a collection of covers paying tribute to Venezuelan rock acts such as Sentimiento Muerto, Seguridad Nacional, and King Changó. In 2025, they performed live in Madrid.

== Discography ==
- Taguara's Forever (2000)
- Hasta que los bares nos separen (2002)
- Masacre en el pin 5 (2004)
- Sopa, seco y jugo (2008)
- U.E.L.M. (2010)
- Dios, el Diablo y el dinero (2014)
- El museo de los pillos (2022)
