= Archangel pigeon =

Breed of pigeon

Archangel
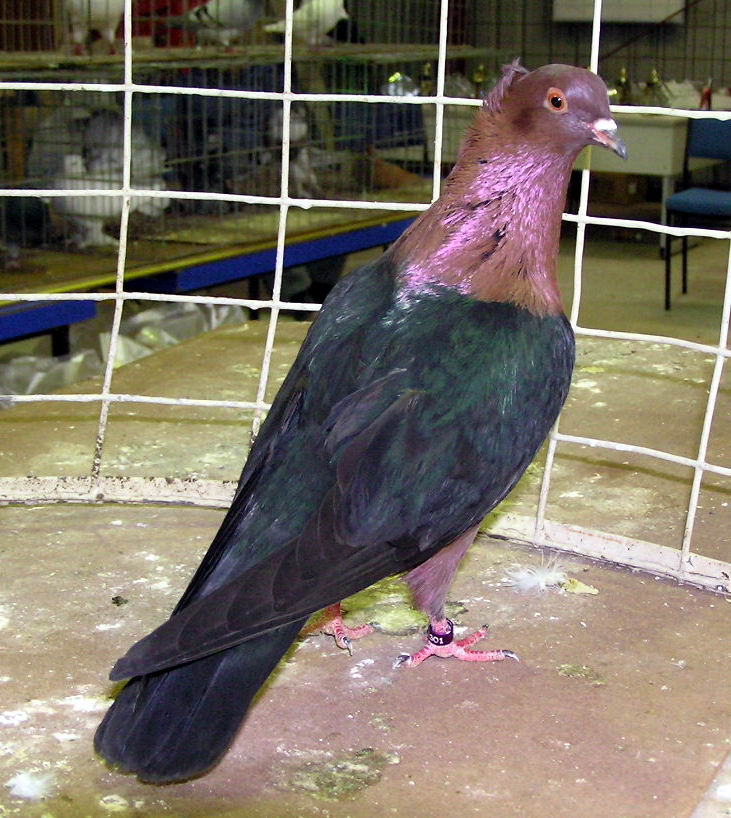
- Conservation status: Common
- Other names: Gimpel
- Country of origin: Croatia

Classification
- Australian Breed Group: Group 2 Color Pigeons
- US Breed Group: Fancy pigeons
- EE Breed Group: Colour pigeons (D/402)

The Archangel (Latin: Columba illyrica, Croatian: Arkanđeo, Albanian: Pëllumbi ilir) is a breed of fancy pigeon, notable for the metallic sheen of its feathers. Archangels, along with other varieties of domesticated pigeons, are all descendants from the rock pigeon (Columba livia). It is kept as an ornamental or fancy breed, valued for its unusual appearance. Archangels are small, weighing about 12 oz. They have unfeathered legs and dark orange eyes. They may or may not be crested. The body of the bird is bronze or gold with wings that are either black, white, or blue.

This breed is also known as the Gimpel, which is German for Eurasian bullfinch. The United States is the only country in which all color forms are referred to as "Archangels". In Great Britain, only the black and copper colored birds are called Archangels as the black and copper color type was created in Great Britain.

The Archangel is known as Gimpeltaube in Germany, where most color types were refined. This is a very old breed; the most likely place origin is Dalmatia / Illyria. Breeders maintain consistency within the breed by following the breed standard.

== Standard ==
- Element Characteristics:
  - Head: Lightly curved, longish and narrow with a fairly flat frontal. The crest develops from the back of the shoulders and runs up to the apex, and here developing into a sharp conical point upon the head. The feathers from both sides of the shoulders converge together into a ridge or niche which runs up the back of the neck to form the crest.
  - Eyes: Very vivid, the iris is dark orange in color and is surrounded by a very slightly developed cere which is light pink to flesh in coloration.
  - Beak: Long thin and straight, the upper beak being slightly curved at the tip. The color the beak is light horn which becomes darker close to the tip.
  - Neck: Fairly long and comparatively thin. The throat is well rounded out.
  - Breast: Moderately wide and slightly pronounced.
  - Back: Sloping down and blending well into the tail.
  - Wings: Moderately longe, tightly closed and lying nicely upon the tail without crossing. The tips should not extend to the end of the tail.
  - Tail: Long and narrow, tightly closed, being slightly longer than the flights. The tail must not be carried too low as to touch the ground.

== Gallery ==
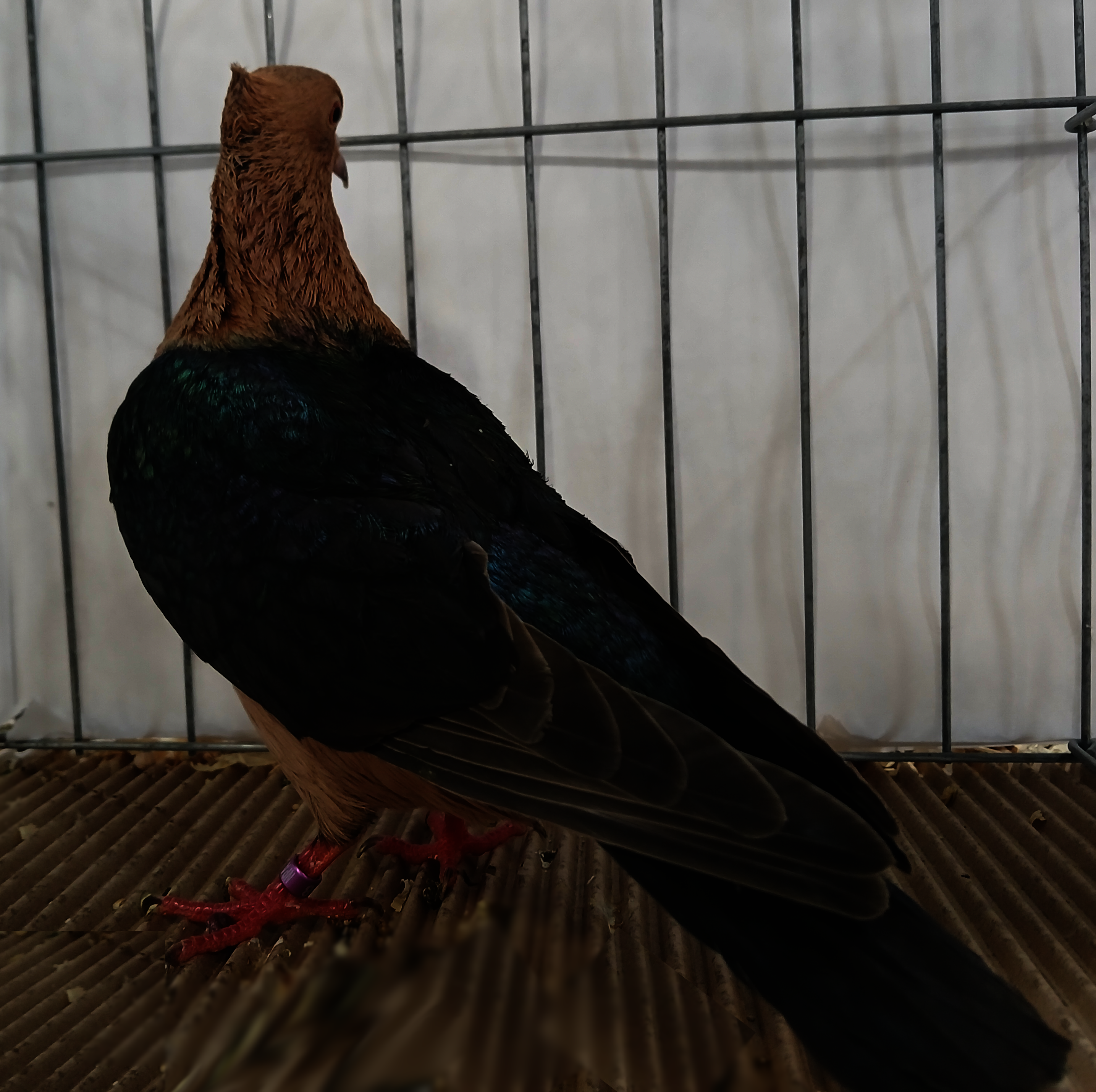
Gold

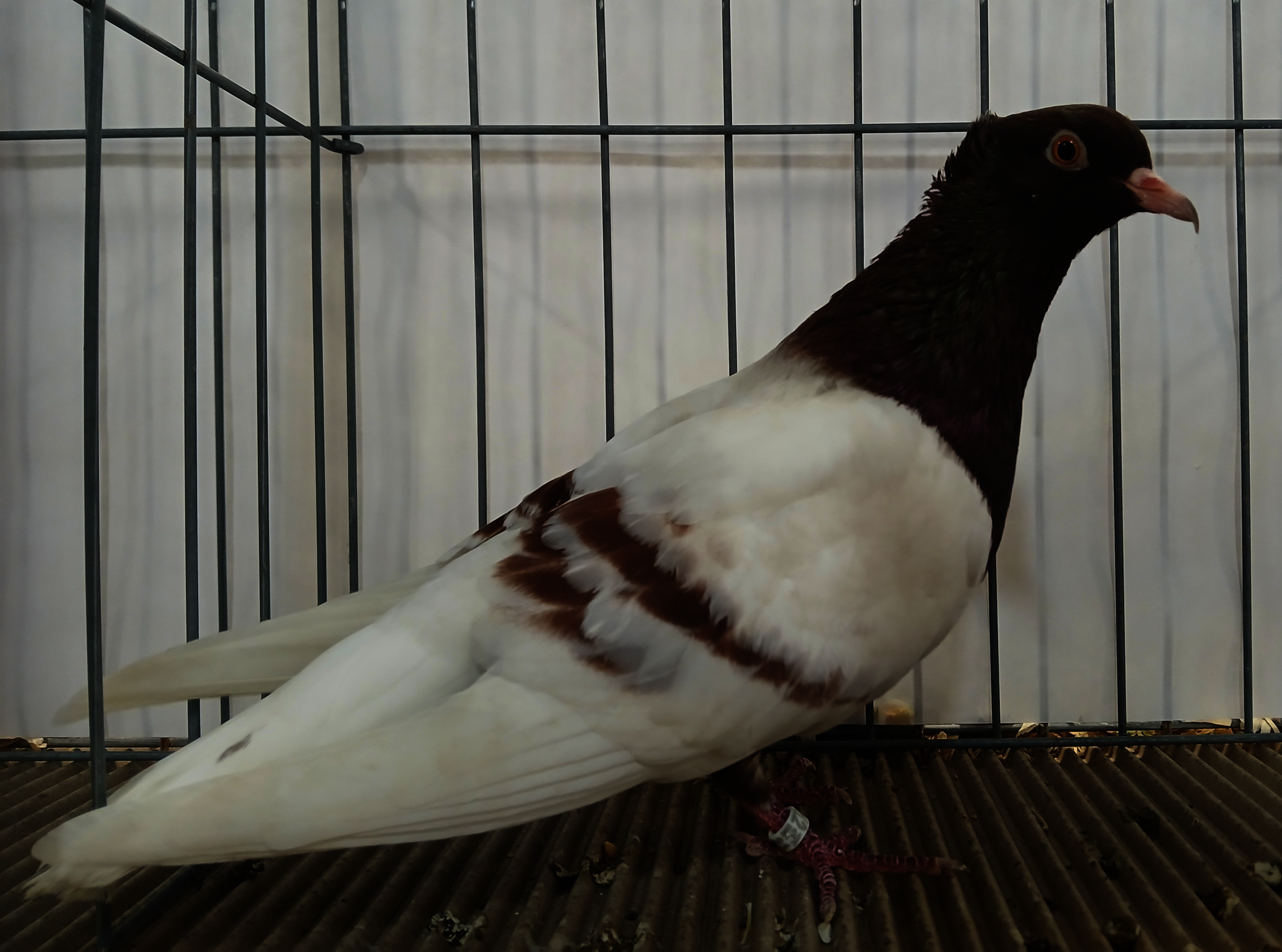
Red bar

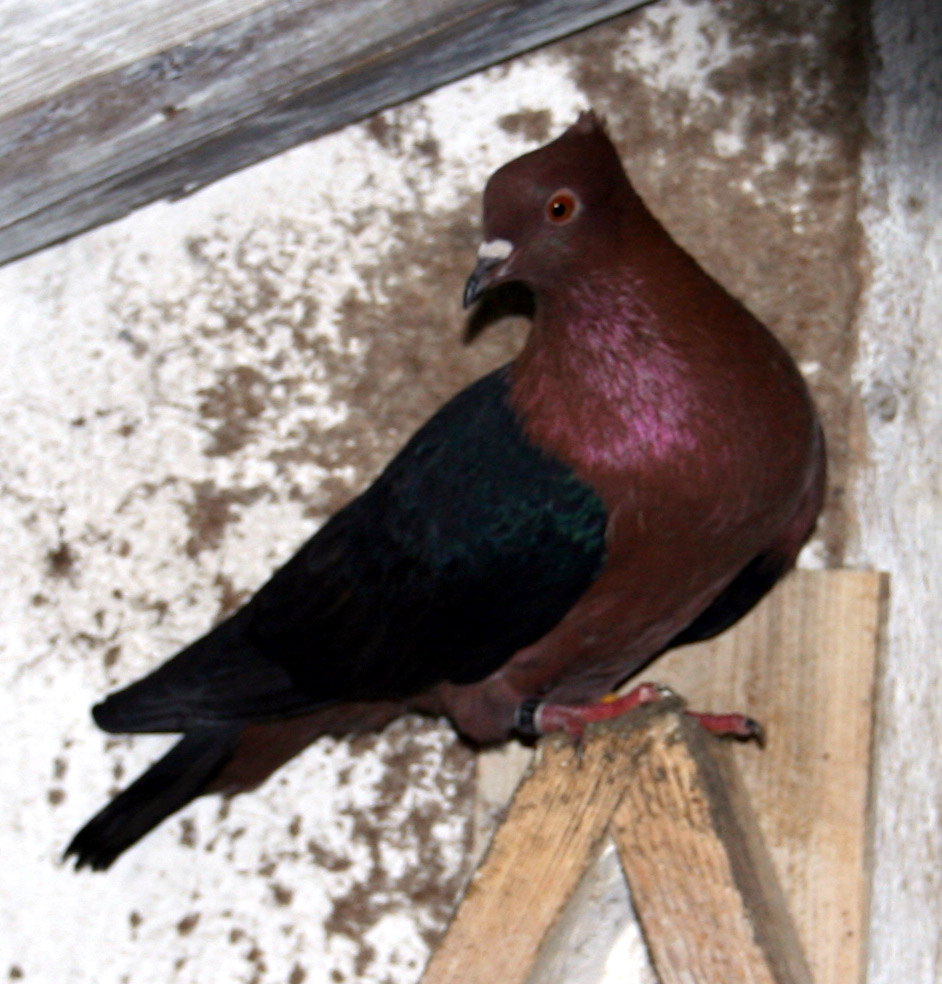
Bronze

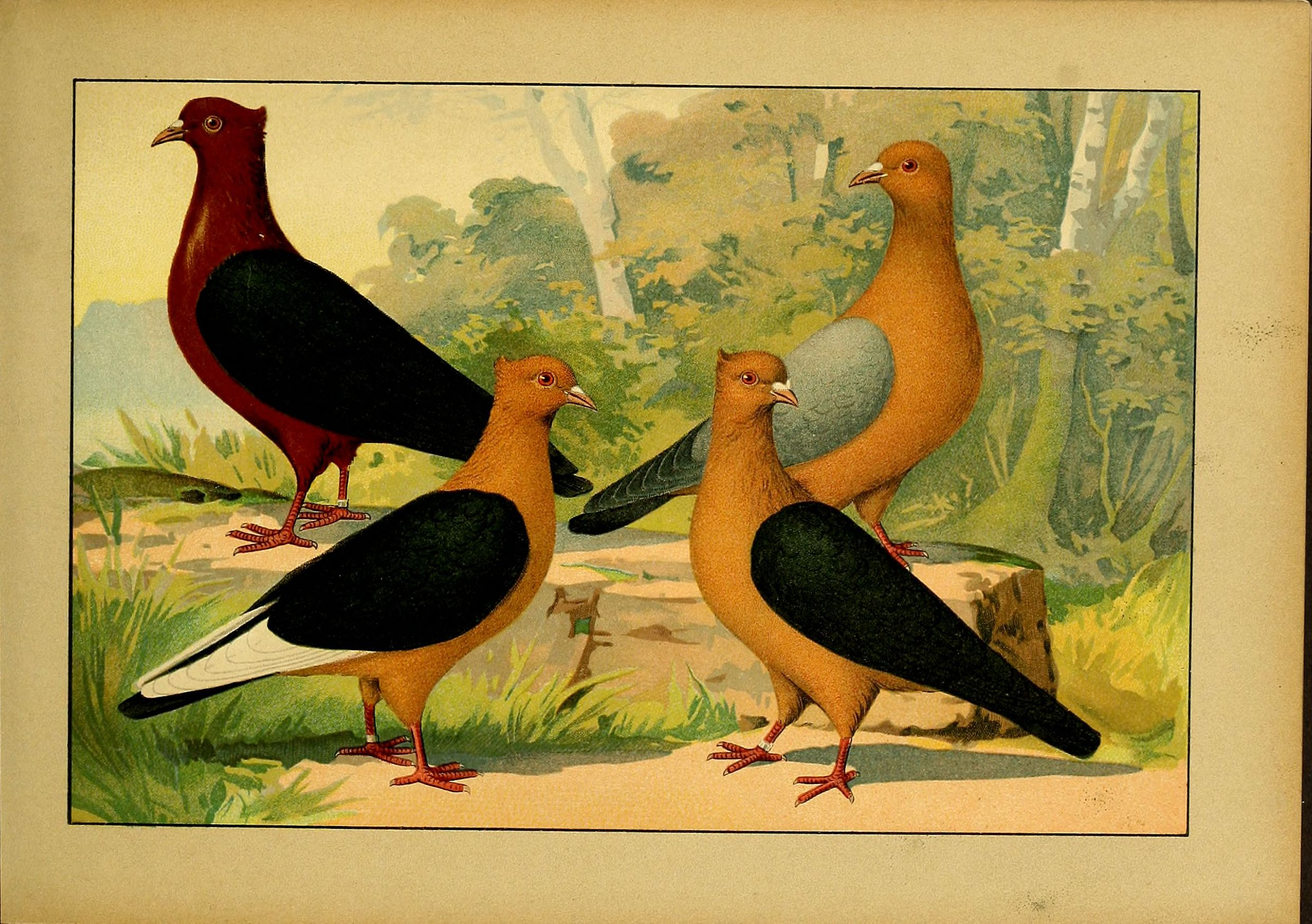
Schachtzabel 1906 Tafel 24

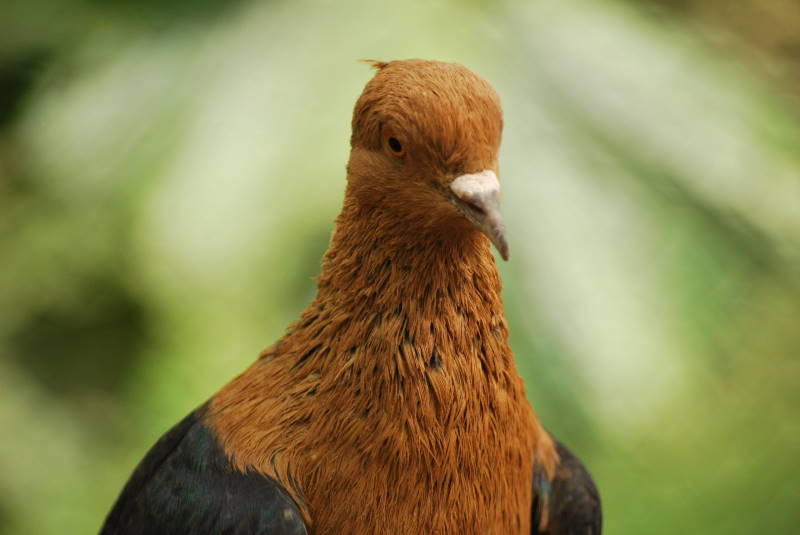
Head view

== See also ==
- Pigeon Diet
- Pigeon Housing
- List of pigeon breeds
