= Culto oculto =

Experimental music band

Culto ocultO
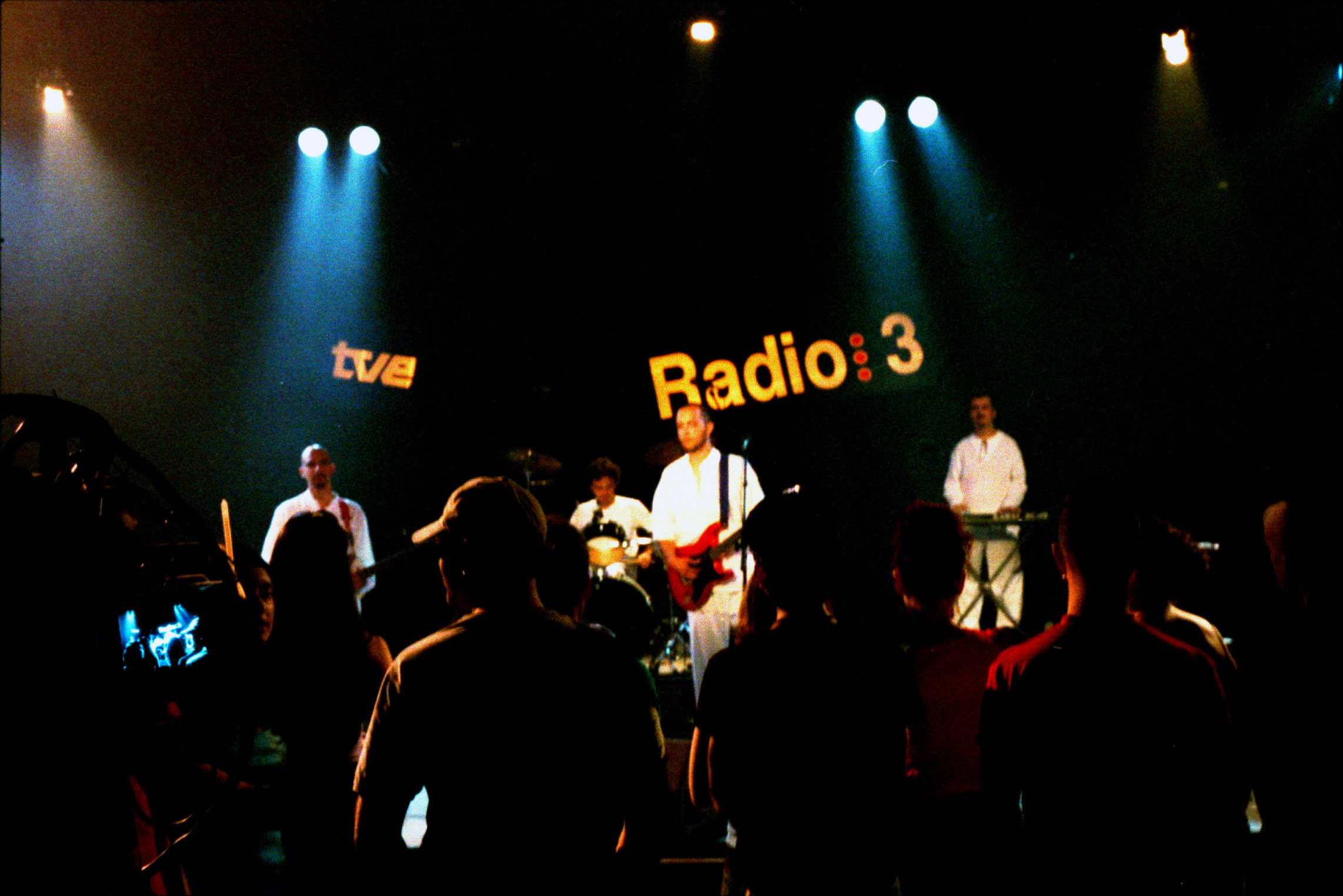
- Culto Oculto performing at RTVE in 2003.

Background information
- Origin: Caracas, Venezuela; Spain
- Genre: Post-rock
- Years active: 1989–present
- Labels: Culebra Records; Plutonrecords; FTS-records; MusicMangiatore
- Members: José Henriquez; Sydney GATO Reyes; Jose Juan Sanguinetti; Paulo M. De Oliveira
- Past members: Rafael Monsalve (a.k.a. "Tato"); Guiomar Marquez; Andres Rangel; Rafael Martínez (a.k.a. "Rafucho")
- Website: CultoocultO Official website

Culto ocultO (often called Cultooculto) is an experimental rock band formed in Caracas, Venezuela in the late 1980s. Its career has been characterised by a blend of elements from post-punk, psychedelic rock, experimental rock, no wave, electronic music and forms associated with the bolero, with an emphasis on sonic and theatrical experimentation. The blend spent much of its early career in Venezuelan underground scena before taking part in the Festival Nuevas Bandas in 1995 and beginning to perform internationally, with appearances in the United States, Mexico, Spain the United Kingdom, Portugal and Hungary.

== Formation and early years (1989-1996) ==
Culto ocultO was formed in 1989 by guitarist José Henriquez, bass player Sydney "Gato" Reyes and keyboard player Ricardo Da Silva, who identified with the post-punk movement of the time and conceived the project as more of a fellowship than a conventional band. After several years in Caracas underground, the band came to wider attention in 1995 when it performed at the 5th Festival Nuevas Bandas. A self-tittled demo recorded that year earned it some recognition and led to performances in Venezuela and abroad.

== Albums and international tours (1996-2003) ==
The band's first album, Flotar no es mas que existir.. un movimiento ondulatorio was recorded in 1996-97 and released by the Mexican label Culebra Continental, appearing in 1997. In February 1997 the band undertook a promotional tour of Miami, Los Angeles, Mexico, Chile, Argentina and Spain, giving interviews to media outlets that incluided Radio Nacional de España. The music video for the single "El mono y la lagartija was in rotation on MTV Latino for several months, durin which the band toured countries including the United States, England and Mexico, performing at venues such as CBGB in New York City and the Palacio de los Deportes in Mexico City.

In early 1999 it received nominations at the Venezuelan Pop & Rocks Awards for best video, best album and best live band, its second consecutive year of nominations.

The second album, "Baralt000mix", was released in 2000, and the third,Blanco, in 2002. Blanco was reissued by FTS-Records in 2006. In 2003 the band toured Spain and Portugal as part of the Blanco Tour 2003. During the tour it was interviewed on Curto Circuito, a youth programme on the Portuguese channel SIC Radical, and closed the Festival Radio Círculo at the Círculo de Bellas Artes in Madrid on 24 june.

== Hiatus and return (2007-present) ==
After the European tour, band members suspended the band's activities and began other musical projects. The band later settle in Spain and continued to perform in various European locations. In 2007 it performed at the 15th Sziget Festival in Budapest, Hungary, and in January 2010 it gave a special presentation in Caracas, announcing that it was working in a new album.

The band was never officially disbanded and gave sporadic performances on both sides of the Atlantic; in 2021 Henriquez, Reyes, Sanguinetti and De Oliveira resumed work together. Their fourth album, Puticlub, was released on 25 May 2023, with Javier Corcobado contributing to the production and recording.

== Band members ==
- José Henriquez, guitar, first vocal, computers
- Sydney Reyes (a.k.a. "Gato"), bass, vocal, computers
- José Juan Sanguinetti, drums
- Paulo M. De Oliveira, keyboards and computers

== Additional/guest musicians ==
- Rafael Martinez, Percussion
- Angela Gugliotta, Percussion
- José "Pinguino" Echezuria, guitar and producer
- Jorge Ramirez, guitar and producer

== former members ==
- Rafael "tato" Monsalve, drums
- Andres Rangel, drums
- Ricardo Da Silva, keyboards and vocal
- Guiomar Márquez, vocal

== Discography ==
- Flotar no es mas que existir.. un movimiento ondulatorio (1996)
- Baralt000mix (2000)
- Blanco (2002)
- Puticlub (2023)
