= Ángeles Balbiani =

Argentine actress, model, television presenter and journalist

- Born: Ángeles Constanza Balbiani Morea; August 7, 1981 (age 43); Buenos Aires, Argentina
- Occupations: Actress; Model; Television presenter; Journalist
- Years active: 2002-present
- Spouse: Félix Maglione (m. 2007; div. 2019)
- Partner: Juan Ciampi (2018-present)
- Children: 2
- Parent(s): José Manuel Balbiani Méndez and Bárbara Morea

Ángeles Constanza Balbiani Morea (born August 7, 1981) better known as Angie Balbiani is an Argentine actress, model, television presenter and journalist.

== Biography ==
Ángeles Constanza Balbiani Morea was born on August 7, 1981, in Buenos Aires, Argentina. She made her debut appearance in media as a child model, aged three. Balbiani was the student at the University of Dramatic Arts in Buenos Aires, when she landed her first role on television series Rebelde Way.

== Career ==
=== Television career ===
From 2002 to 2003, Balbiani landed the role of Felicitas Mitre on teenage soap opera Rebelde Way, created by Chiquititas author Cris Morena. Thanks to this role, Balbiani became a recognized television actress in many countries worldwide, including Eastern and Southern Europe, Israel and Latin America. She co-starred Luisana Lopilato, Camila Bordonaba, Benjamín Rojas and Felipe Colombo. In one episode of Rebelde Way, she performed Erreway song "Inmortal", and was a member of Erreway in television series for a very short time. Balbiani was also the companion of Erreway on their tours, Erreway en Grand Rex (2002), Nuestro Tiempo (2003) and Gira 2004 (2004).

In 2004, she got the role of Sofía Santillán in another series of Cris Morena, Floricienta, co-starring Florencia Bertotti and Juan Gil Navarro.

She has then made a pause in her career due to her marriage and pregnancy.

== Personal life ==
Balbiani's parents separated when she was nine; her mother later remarried to a man named Javier. She has an older sister, Bárbara, an older brother, José Manuel, and two younger brothers, Rodrigo and Marcial. She is nicknamed Angie, Angu, Reina, Simpática and Pendeja for her friends. Her favorite actor is Marlon Brando; favorite film Todo sobre mi madre. Balbiani's favorite music artist is Arjona and her favorite writer is Paul Auster. She said she would like to live in Milan or Florence.

Balbiani married Félix Maglione on June 17, 2007, in Buenos Aires. In 2008, she gave birth to the couple's first child, a boy, whom they called Benjamín Maglione. The couple divorced in 2019.

Since 2018, Ángeles Balbiani is in a relationship with Juan Ciampi. On December 10, 2021, she gave birth to her second child and first child with her partner, whom they called Cósimo Ciampi.

== Filmography ==
=== Television ===
Year	Title	Character	Channel
2002-2003	Rebelde Way	Felicitas Mitre	Canal 9/América TV
2004-2005	Floricienta	Sofía Santillán Torres-Oviedo	Canal 13

=== Theater ===
Year	Title	Character	Director	Theater
2002	Rebelde Way	Felicitas Mitre	Cris Morena	Teatro Gran Rex
2002-2004	Erreway	Herself	Cris Morena	
2004	Floricienta en el Teatro	Sofía Santillán Torres-Oviedo	Cris Morena	Teatro Gran Rex
2005	Floricienta, Princesa de la Terraza	Sofía Santillán Torres-Oviedo	Cris Morena	Teatro Gran Rex

=== Television Programs ===
Year	Program	Channel	Notes
2018	Pampita Online	KZO	Penalist
2018-2019	Pampita Online	Net TV	Penalist
2018-2020	Intrusos	América TV	Penalist
2019	Gossip	Net TV	Penalist
2020	Incorrectas	América TV	Panelist
2020–present	Editando tele	Net TV	Penalist
