= Archangel (2014 video game) =

- Developer(s): Black Tower Studios
- Publisher(s): Unity Games
- Platform(s): iOS, Android
- Release: January 9, 2014
- Genre(s): Action-adventure
- Mode(s): Single-player

Archangel is an action-adventure game developed by Black Tower Studios and published by Unity Games for iOS and Android in 2014.

== Reception ==
Reception

Aggregate score
Aggregator	Score
Metacritic	66/100

Review scores
Publication	Score
Gamezebo	2/5 stars
MacLife	3.5/5 stars
Pocket Gamer	3.5/5 stars
The Digital Fix	5/10
Digital Spy	4/5 stars

The iOS version received "average" reviews according to the review aggregation website Metacritic. Digital Spy said, "Archangel is slow to get started, but after gaining some abilities and spells the pace of combat picks up for a satisfying and long-lasting dungeon crawler." MacLife said, "While lacking the depth and visual diversity of its desktop counterparts, Archangel is a fun touch screen take on the action RPG." Pocket Gamer called it "a well-crafted dungeon-crawler with a handful of nice touches, but it could use a little more spark and imagination in its world design and core gameplay." However, The Digital Fix said of the iPad version, "Archangel takes several innovative steps towards making the dungeon-crawler viable for phones and tablets, including cloud saving for play on multiple devices, but ultimately it's just a pale, pale shadow of what the likes of Diablo 3, Torchlight 2 and even the free-to-play Path of Exile are capable of doing on the PC." Gamezebo gave it a negative review, saying, "There's just too much silliness to suffer through to dig into the parts of Archangel that are good. This is one of a wave of titles showing how pretty mobile games can look on up-to-date hardware, but the beauty is definitely only skin deep. Gameplay matters, even on phones and tablets."
