= Todosantos =

- Origin: Caracas, Distrito Capital, Venezuela
- Genres: Electronic, indie and Latin
- Years active: 2003–2009
- Labels: Superagencia (Venezuela), Ponirepublic (Mexico), Flamin Hotz (United States)
- Members: Alberto Stangarone, Ernesto Pantin, Francisco Mejía, Luis Montenegro and Mariana Martín.

Todosantos was an audiovisual electronic indie band from Caracas Venezuela, later relocated to Brooklyn, New York.

== History ==
The band formed in Caracas in 2003 by Ernesto Pantin (programming) and Alberto Stangarone (guitar, voice, programming). Initially, the band was called Todosantos Dub and its musical orientation was oriented towards electronic trends; beginning to appear in the same year 2003 in some events where with the use of laptop and absence of drums and percussion elements they manage to create an atmosphere of great acceptance.

In 2004, they expanded into a quartet with the addition of Francisco Mejía (bass, guitar, voice) and Luis Montenegro (programming, visual art). They were renamed Todosantos and their style begins to incorporate elements of rock, dark and post-punk, without neglecting the electronic base of their beginnings. They participate, as guests, in the Festival Nuevas Bandas 2004 achieving great acceptance.

Their recording debut comes with the album Aeropuerto (2005).

In 2008 they performed at MX Beat Soundfest in Toluca, Mexico, and South by Southwest in Austin, Texas.

Then Francisco Mejía and Luís Montenegro leave the band, and Mariana Martin enters Todosantos. After this, they settle in Brooklyn, NY where they separate after some time. In 2011, Alberto Stangarone and Alberto Pantín returned to Venezuela with Sunsplash and Cocobass where they continued their musical careers.

The band made official remixes for El Guincho & Simon Diaz.

== Legacy ==
Despite a short career held between Caracas and New York City; Todosantos's DIY ethics, no future vibes, and genre-bending aesthetics have been cited as influential by critically acclaimed Venezuelan artists such as La Vida Boheme (Grammy Winners), Los Mesoneros (Grammy Nominees), Americania, and experimental icon Arca among others. Todosantos's brief career bridged the gap between the Indie and electronic scenes, spearheading the rise of a new generation, willing to redefine what Venezuelan rock would sound and look like for years to come.

Todosantos shared stage with international artists such as Los Amigos Invisibles, Benny Blanco, Cut Copy, Digitalism, Jarvis Cocker, Spank Rock, Treasure Fingers, Dre Skull, Yacht, The Slits, Kinky & Plastilina Mosh among others.

== Discography ==
- Aeropuerto (2005)
