= Belén Scalella =

Argentine actress and singer

- Born: Belén Scalella; 19 August 1981 (age 44); Buenos Aires, Argentina
- Years active: 2000–present

Belén Scalella (born August 19, 1981, in Buenos Aires) is an Argentine actress and singer. She is known for her television roles of Belén Menendez Pacheco in Rebelde Way and Belu in El Refugio (de los Sueños). As a member of music group Rolabogan, she recorded one album titled Rolabogan (2006).

== Personal life ==
Scalella has never specified her date of birth. She stated she was born in 1982, and Leo as her horoscope sign, which means she was born in either July or August. However, in the Argentina electoral registers she appears as born on August 19, 1981.

Scalella cited Madonna and Aretha Franklin as her favourite singers.

== Filmography ==
Year	Title	Format	Role	Notes
2000	Chiquititas	TV series	Campanita	
2002–03	Rebelde Way	TV series	Belén Menendez Pacheco	
2003	Tiempo	Music Video	Herself	By Erreway
2006	El Refugio (de los Sueños)	TV series	Belu	See also: Rolabogan

== Discography ==
- 2006 — Rolabogan
