= Frederic Marshall (lawyer) =

Frederic Marshall (13 March 1839 – 1 August 1910) was a British barrister.

The fourth son of William Marshall of Northampton, he was educated at the University of London, graduating BA in 1862 and LLB in 1870. He entered the Inner Temple on 27 May 1867 and was called to the bar on 17 November 1870. He practised on the North Wales circuit, and was revising barrister for the counties of Merioneth and Montgomery from 1884 to 1892. He was made Queen's Counsel in 1893 and a bencher of the Inner Temple in 1900, and was a member of Convocation for the University of London.

Marshall was married firstly to Annie, daughter of J. B. Evans of Wansfield Hall, Staffordshire; she died in 1900. In 1902 he was married secondly to Marie Antoinette, daughter of François Antoine Sieffert of Paris. He lived at The Oaks, Alleyn Park, Dulwich, and had chambers at 3 Harcourt Buildings, Temple then 5 Essex Court, Temple.
