= Barbara Luna (singer) =

Argentine singer

- Born: Roque Pérez, Buenos Aires Province, Argentina
- Occupation: Singer
- Years active: 1998–present
- Website: www.barbara-luna.com (requires Adobe Flash Player; in French)

Barbara Luna is an Argentine singer, born in Roque Pérez, Buenos Aires Province to a musical family. She studied architecture in Argentina, then moved to France. She has lived and worked in France since the 1990s.

== Career ==
Luna's music is inspired by Native American, traditional African, salsa, and tango influences. She has appeared in World of Music, Arts and Dance, an international arts touring festival.

=== Discography ===
- 1998 – A la vida a la muerte
- 2001 – India Morena
- 2006 – Somos
- 2007 – Live à Athènes
- 2009 – Ruta Tres

== See also ==
- List of Argentine musicians
- List of singers
