= Mariana Esnoz =

Argentinean actress and singer

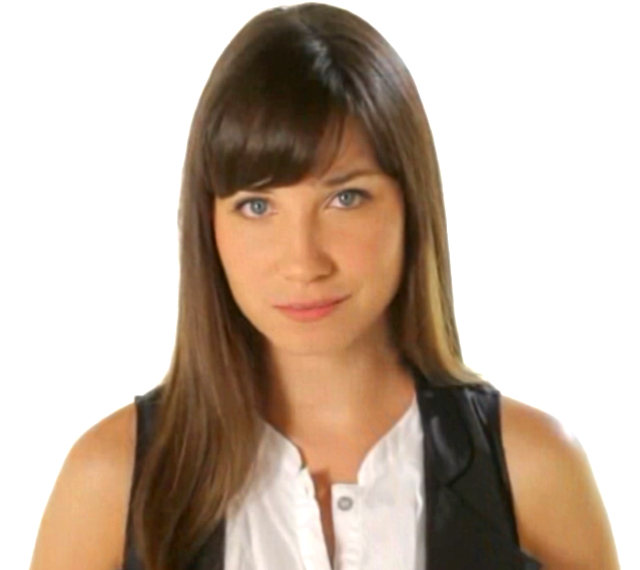
In 2012, Mariana Esnoz appeared in a video produced by the Wikimedia Foundation.

Mariana Esnoz (Spanish pronunciation: [maɾiˈana esˈnos]) (born February 25, 1984, Florida, Buenos Aires, Argentina) is an Argentinean Actor and singer.

== Career ==
Esnoz is best known for her role as Quela Musso in the teen drama Champs 12, where she also sang. In 2010 she appeared in two soap operas: Cain and Abel and Date Blind. She also starred in the plays Paris in America with Paula Castagnetti, and The Last Supper.

=== Television ===
- 2012 The Sole Veronique, The Thirteen
- 2010 Cain and Abel, Telefe
- 2010 All against John, Rosstoc Prod
- 2010 Date Blind : Valeria, Rosstoc Prod
- 2009 Champs 12 : Quela, Dori Media Group

=== Theatre ===
- 2011 Paris in America, the protagonist
- 2009 The Last Supper by Dan Rosen. Protagonist, production and translation. Award-winning star of March 2009.

== See also ==
- Cinema of Argentina
