= Carla Borghetti =

Argentine singer

Carla Borghetti (18 September 1971 in Buenos Aires) is an Argentine singer who specializes in Tango music.

== Biography ==
Borghetti was born into a musically active family. She studied voice performance at the Conservatorio Superior de Música "Manuel De Falla" in Buenos Aires.

== Singing career ==
Borghetti's first experience with public performance was in 1998 with the quartet Vuelta de Rocha, a tango performance group which competed in several Argentine contests. The group won second place in its category in the first Biennial contest of the Facultad de Ciencias Económicas de la Universidad de Buenos Aires.

In 2003 Borghetti relocated to México City, where she continued performing and competing. She participated in the FIME 2007 festival. She collaborated in music for theater, including Cada Quién su Frida (Ofelia Medina), Pacamambo and Willy Protágoras Encerrado en el Baño, both directed by Hugo Arrevillaga.

In 2005 she co-founded La Compañia del Tango Nomada with Iván Peňaňori (who serves as artistic director). The effort is a fusion of tango with other forms of popular music. She is also part of the Mexican company Latin Tango.

Her work in traditional tango has been gathered in a compilation album entitled Bagaje (Baggage).

She collaborated with Dina Rot in the album Buena semana, which contains Sephardic melodies.

In 2008 she was recognized for her Musical Innovation in the IV Festival de las Artes Escénicas y Alternativas in Mexico City.

In June 2009 she participated in the Feria de las Culturas Amigas de la Ciudad de México, hosted by the Argentine Embassy in Mexico and by the Culture Secretariat of the Mexican government.
