= Unos Panas Ahí =

Argentinean/Venezuelan rock band

- Origin: Caracas, Venezuela
- Genres: Alternative rock
- Years active: 2000 - present
- Members: Luis Poggi (vocals and guitar); Alfredo Poggi (vocals and bass); Eduard Perez (percussion); Marcos Tinedo (keyboards); Daniel Crespo (drums)

Unos Panas Ahí is an Argentinean–Venezuelan alternative rock band. Formed in Caracas in 2000, the group comprises the Poggi brothers, Luis Poggi (vocals and guitar), Alfredo Poggi (vocals and bass), Marcos Tinedo (keyboards), and Daniel Crespo (drums).

== History ==
Luis and Alfredo Poggi wrote and released the song "El Mamut Chiquitito" with their Venezuelan band Unos Panas Ahí, which became a hit. After the success of "El Mamut Chiquitito," the band released other singles, such as "Yo no quiero," "Macho que se respeta," and "Yo hago lo que quiero".

Unos Panas Ahí won awards in Venezuela, such as the Festival Alma Mater Nuevas Bandas in 2001, Urbe's Best Song of the Year in 2002, the Unimet Nuevas Bandas competition in 2002, and the UCAB music contest in 2002.

In March 2010, Unos Panas Ahí & The Poggi's recorded an English version of "El Mamut Chiquitito" ("The Little Mammoth Song") accompanied by a video similar to the original, which was uploaded to YouTube. The song was released on digital stores on April 20, 2010.

== Legacy ==
In 2018, the Spanish newspaper Marca included his song "El Mamut Chiquitito" on its list of "the 25 most ridiculous hits in the history of our music."

At the 2026 Viña del Mar Festival, Venezuelan comedian Esteban Düch performed a cover of "El Mamut Chiquitito", an occasion on which he won the Gaviota de Oro.

== Discography ==
=== EP ===
- Hermanos Poggi (2018)

=== Singles ===
- "El Mamut Chiquitito" or "The Little Mammoth"
- "Yo hago lo que quiero" (I do what I want)
- "Macho que se respeta" (Macho who is respected)
- "Yo no quiero" (I don't want)
