= Danilo Parra =

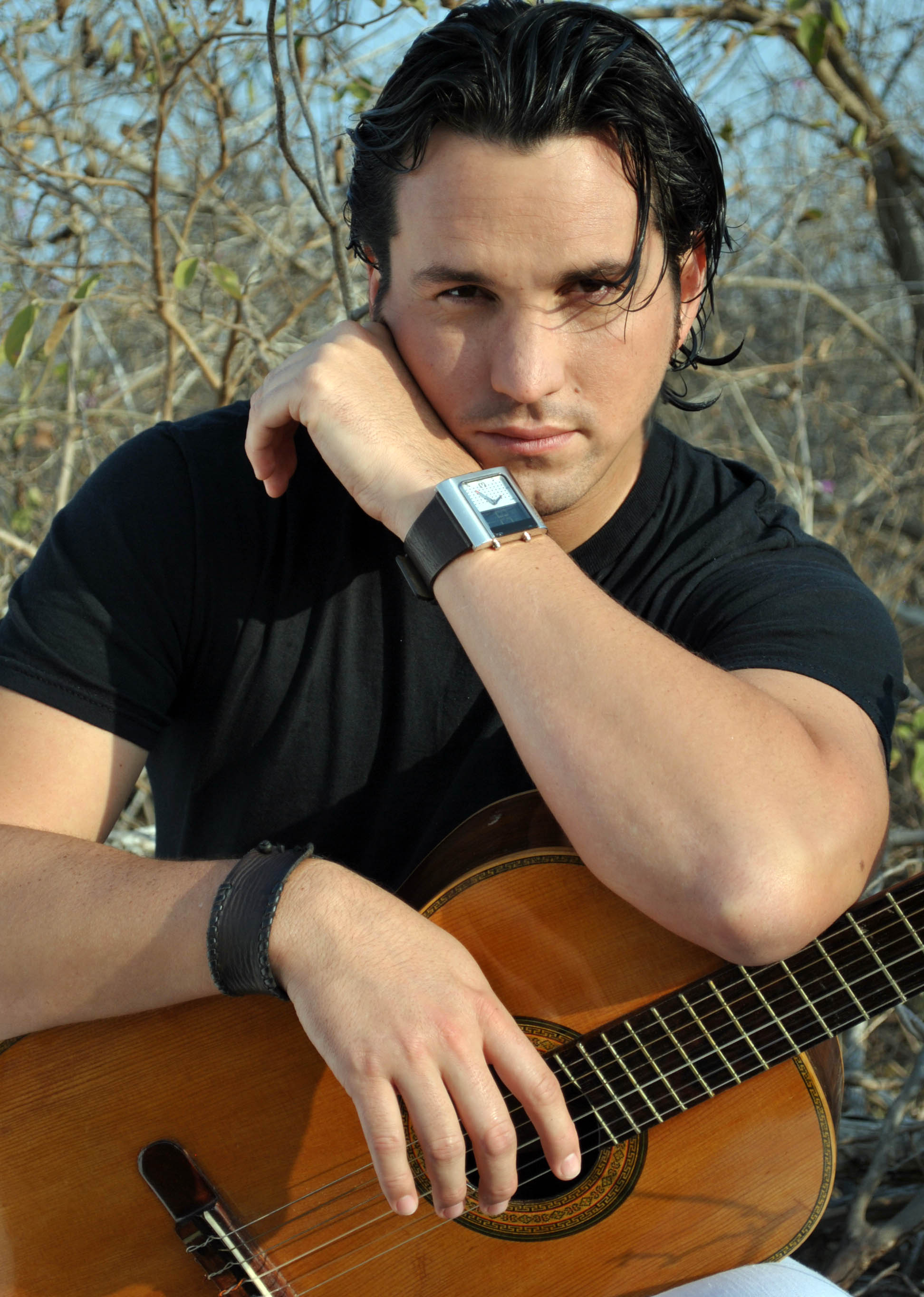
- Parra in 2013

Background information
- Also known as: Danilo
- Born: Danilo Parra
- Origin: Guayaquil, Guayas, Ecuador
- Genres: Romantic, Latin Pop
- Occupations: Singer, songwriter, producer
- Instruments: Vocals, guitar
- Label: Independent
- Website: www.daniloparra.com

Danilo Parra (born in Ecuador, May 14) is an Ecuadorian singer with Colombian, Italian and Spanish roots.

== Biography ==
Parra became a singer in 2002 and obtained an airplay deal in his country the following year. In 2002 he won the award "Revelacion del Año 2002" (Best New Artist) and at the end of 2003 the magazine La Onda recognized him as the "Best Singer of 2003." Later the magazine Hogar dedicated a page to his record production.

His song "Preciosa" was awarded the "Cancion del 2004" by some national TV programs. Parra was recognized as the "Artist of the year" in 2004.

== Discography ==
- SuperSingles (2003)
- Mis Canciones (2005)
- Mis Canciones/Mis Versiones (2007)
- Danilo Parra 3,618 (2009)
- El Mejor hombre del mundo (2011)
- Canto a Mi País (2014) feat Karlos Xavier Autor y compositor de Canto a Mi Pais
