= Domingo en llamas =

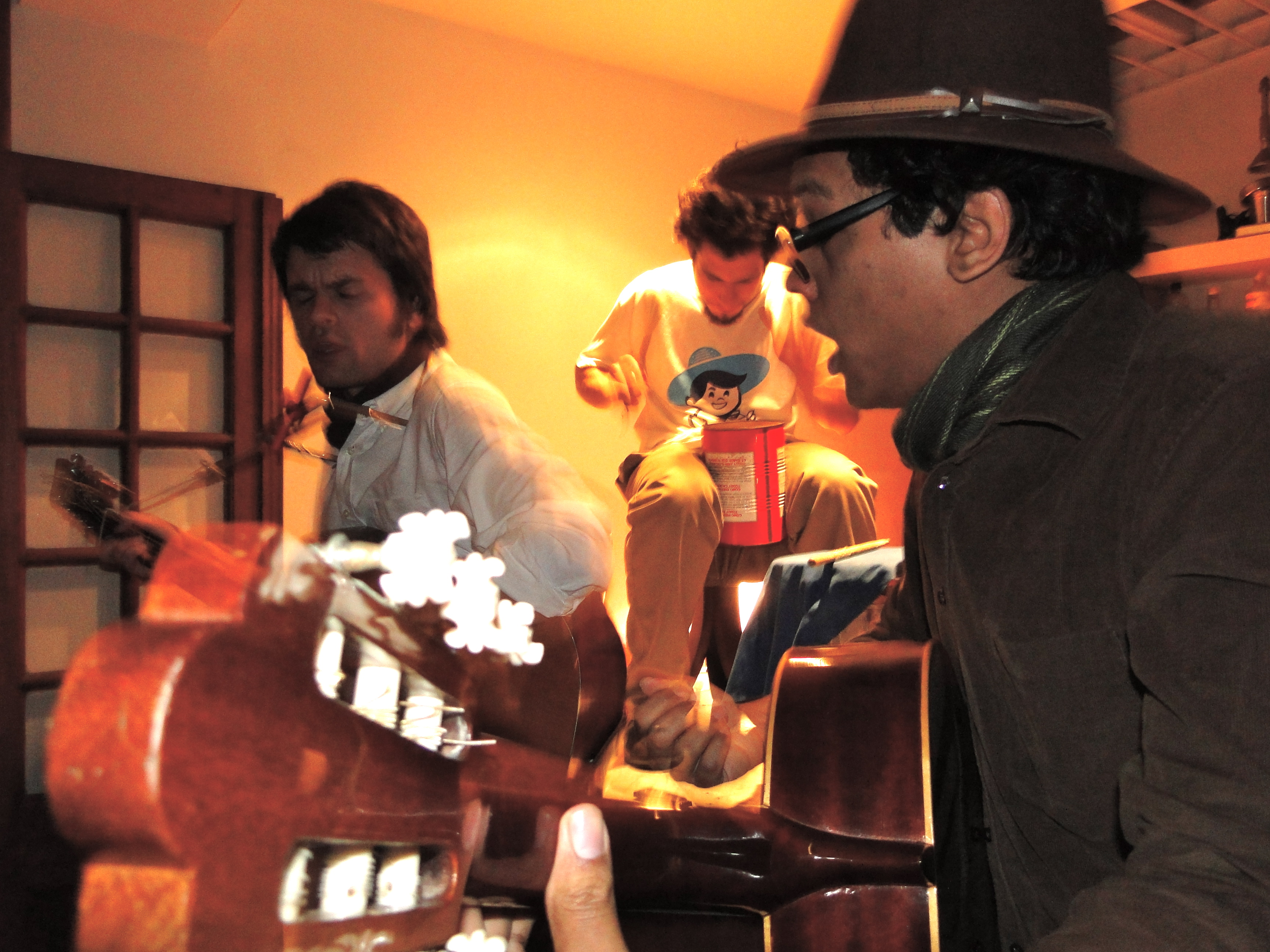
- José Ignacio Benítez (left)

Background information
- Origin: Caracas, Venezuela
- Genres: Rock, blues, jazz
- Years active: 2005-2017
- Members: José Ignacio Benítez

Domingo en llamas was a Venezuelan musical project started in Caracas in 2005 by José Ignacio Benítez, the only constant member, until 2017.

== History ==
José Ignacio Benítez was part of Master Gurú, a band that achieved some fame by winning the edition of the Festival Nuevas Bandas in 2003, disbanding shortly after this, in 2004, after which Domingo en llamas was created.

Between 2005 and 2014 Domingo en llamas independently released twelve albums, four which were published simultaneously in 2014, on which Benítez collaborated with Juanma Trujillo and Simón Hernández, as well as crediting the participation of different alter egos of himself. These last four albums were performed at the Festival de Cantautores, in a concert at the Centro Chacao Cultural in June 2016.

In 2017 the project announced via Facebook its end due to the Venezuelan economic crisis and Benítez's continuation in future projects, which included the release of the album Pajarera vertical with Gustavo Guerrero, then musical director of Natalia Lafourcade, and with Laura Guevara.

== Musical style ==
The project encompassed a wide range of genres ranging from folk, rock, jazz, blues, synth pop and traditional Venezuelan rhythms. The media outlet Analítica defined his music as "rock poetry and tropical psychedelia of high emotional impact".

Lirically, some of Benítez's compositions are declaimed. In the song Memorias de la democracia, the lyrics review the history of the last forty years of the 20th century in Venezuela.

== Legacy ==
In 2016, the project was selected by Univisión as part of the "99 current bands and artists (of Venezuelan alternative music) you should listen to."

== Discography ==
- Domingo en llamas (2005)
- Ciudades sumergidas (2006)
- Historias de disociados y proscritos (2006)
- Desiertos canónicos del folklore (2007)
- Color de presencia (2007)
- Fledermaus (2008)
- Truccatore (2009)
- Harto tropical (2010)
- El clan de las luces (2014)
- Canciones sobre un éxtasis de harta contemplación (2014)
- Adolfo Prieto 232 (2014)
- Nicanor (2014)
