= Seguridad Nacional =

Venezuelan punk rock band

Atkinson
- Origin: Venezuela
- Genres: Punk rock
- Years active: 1981-1994
- Past members: Gustavo Corma; Juan Bautista “Yátu” López; Abraham “Cangrejo” García (†)

Seguridad Nacional was a Venezuelan punk band, formed in 1981, considered a cult band.

== History ==
=== Beginnings ===
The group took its name from its rejection of the repressive body that operated in Venezuela during the dictatorship led by General Marcos Pérez Jiménez between 1952 and 1958.

Pioneers of Venezuelan punk rock, the band had its beginnings in 1981, led by Gustavo Corma on guitar and vocals, Abraham García "Cangrejo" on drums, and William Fermín. Juan Bautista "Yátu" López joined on bass and vocals in 1982, and together they built a proposal represented by punk, new wave, and hardcore, all sung in Spanish, which was unusual for the time.

Their first official show was in 1983 at a punk festival at the Poliedro de Caracas, where they expressed their negative stance toward President Herrera Campíns. Off the bill and sponsored by Gustavo, Yátu, and Cangrejo, Sentimiento Muerto also performed for the first time.

Over time, they would come to be considered a cult band, a foundational stone of the Venezuelan musical underground. Their influence became evident when the songs "Uñas Asesinas" and "Vampiro", covered years later by Zapato 3, became hits.

They were critical of the governments of Luis Herrera Campíns, Jaime Lusinchi, and Carlos Andrés Pérez. Due to their political positions, they were banned from radio stations and festivals.

=== Documento de actitud and separation ===
In 1991, they independently released their first album, titled Documento de actitud.

In 1994, they announced the band's separation, and each member continued their own musical endeavors.

=== First reunion ===
In 2005, two of their founding members, Yátu and Cangrejo went on a concert tour through the country.

=== Second reunion and death of Cangrejo ===
In August 2012, Gustavo Corma traveled to Venezuela and reunited with the rest of the band. The reunion was recorded in Temido Retorno, a documentary directed by photographer Reni Arias and released in 2013. By this time, the band expressed its support for Nicolás Maduro.

On July 22, 2025, Abraham "Cangrejo" García passed away.

== Members ==
- Gustavo Corma – vocals, guitar
- Juan Bautista “Yátu” López – vocals, bass guitar
- Abraham “Cangrejo” García – drums

== Discography ==
- Documento de actitud (1991)
