= Freddy Marshall =

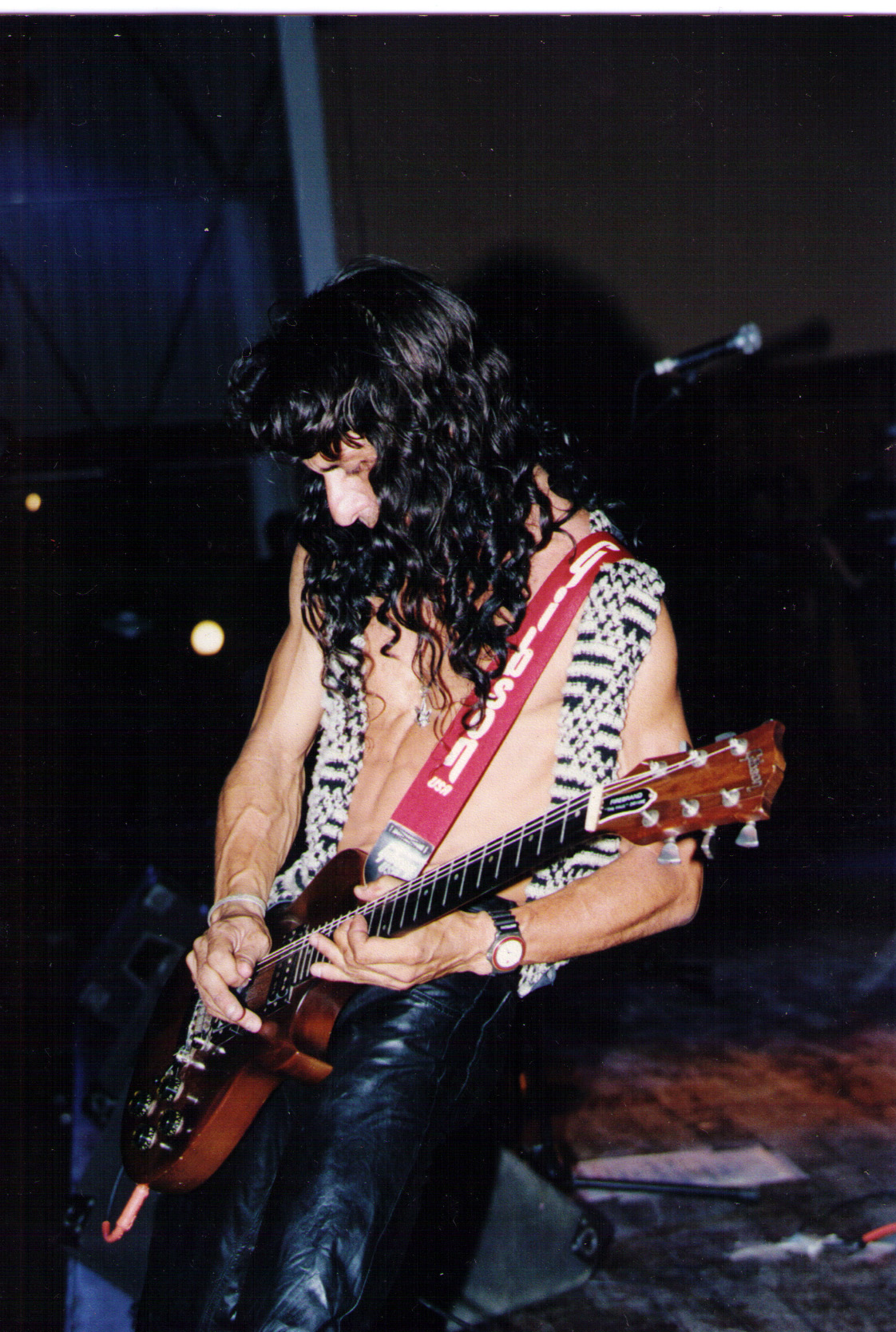

Background information
- Born: November 7, 1959 (age 66)
- Genres: Hard rock, Heavy metal
- Years active: 1975–present

Freddy Marshall, born in Caracas, Venezuela (November 7, 1959), is a musician and songwriter specializing in Heavy Metal. He is a founding member of Power Age and Arkangel, two of the most legendary and successful bands in the Latin American rock scene.

== Career ==
Marshall started his career as musician in 1975, when he and some high school mates formed a band called Badge. This band played covers of artists such as Led Zeppelin, Santana, Humble Pie, Traffic, Crazy Horse and Deep Purple, and Freddy Marshall performed as drummer.

Two years later, Marshall formed a new band called the Equos Reverber Band, where he started to play guitar and write his own songs. In 1978 he met Paul Gillman and the Picozzi (Giancarlo and Giorgio) brothers, who were trying to form a band and they asked Marshall to join the group. The name of the band was Power Age, considered the pioneer of the Heavy Metal music in Venezuela. This band played covers of stars like Aerosmith, Judas Priest, Kiss and AC/DC.

Freddy did not want to play covers, and through his leadership, the band began to include original material in their repertoire. The first original song performed by Power Age was a theme called "Paper Life", composed by Freddy Marshall during his stay in Equos Reverber Band.

For the next two years the band made several nationwide tours which attracted a large following among hard rock and metal fans. This caught the attention of various record labels, one of which, COLOR, offered them a contract to produce and record four albums. In 1980, Power Age changed its name to Arkangel and for the next 23 years the musical career of Freddy Marshall remained tied to the band.

During this time, the band recorded seven albums with Marshall composing some of the most powerful songs included in them. Songs like "El Vagon de la Muerte", "Nada es Eterno", "Despierta America", "La Procesion de Satanas", "Paper Life, "El Juicio Final" among others, became a kind of trade mark for the band`s musical style.

Arkangel shared stage with Scorpions, Joe Perry Project, Barón Rojo, Harlequim, Wrabbit, REO Speedwagon and Rick Wakeman when these artists performed in Venezuela, the band also took part in the Román Chalbaud's motion picture called "Cangrejo", with some of their songs being included in the sound track and appearing in some scenes of the film.

In addition to his work as musician, Marshall was the executive producer on the Arkangel's "No Más Apariencias", "Inmortal" and "El Angel de la Muerte" albums. In 2003 after a long and successful career, Freddy Marshall left Arkangel.

In 2013 after a long retirement, Freddy Marshall takes up again his career as producer releasing a new album called "Hard Times", including some of the best songs composed during his long stay in Arkangel.

In March 2020 Fred Marshall released his first solo album called Iron Horse, containing 8 new songs.

In October 2021 Marshall released a new album called Old Rockers Never Die.

== Discography ==
Eight albums by the band Arkangel.

•Arkangel 1981
•Rock Nacional 1982
•Represión Latinoamericana 1983
•La Respuesta 1987
•No Más Apariencias 1992
•Inmortal 1993
•El Angel de la Muerte 2000
•Hard Times (Arkangel) 2013

Solo albums

•Iron Horse (Marshall) 2020
•Old Rockers Never Die (Marshall) 2021
