= Piru Sáez =

Argentine actor and rock singer

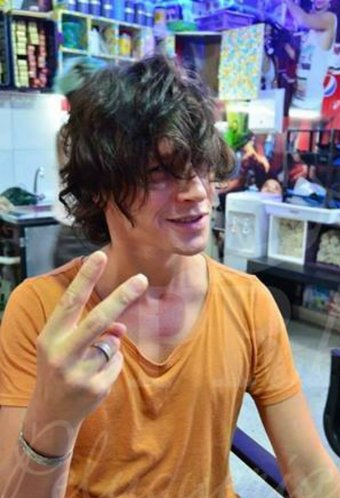
- Piru Sáez in 2014
- Born: Jose Carlos Sebastián Gómez Maraschio; May 20, 1983 (age 43); Mar del Plata, Argentina
- Years active: 2002–present

Jose Carlos Sebastián Gómez Maraschio (born May 20, 1983, in Mar del Plata, Argentina), professionally known as Piru Sáez, is an Argentine actor and rock singer. He is best known for portraying Rocco Fuentes Echagüe in Rebelde Way and Piru in Floricienta and El Refugio (de los Sueños), and being a member of musical group Rolabogan. Currently he is the singer of the Latin rock bands Coverheads and FOXLEY. Actually, the artist are working in a new album to release in 2023.

== Filmography ==
=== Television ===
- La opportunidad de tu vida (Sorpresa y 1/2, 2002) - Piru Sáez
- Rebelde Way (2003) as Rocco Fuentes Echagüe
- Floricienta (2004) as Piru
- El Refugio (de los Sueños) (2006) as Piru
- Champs 12 (2009, episodes 8-9) as Ciru

== Discography ==
=== With Rolabogan ===
==== Albums ====
- 2006: Rolabogan

==== Singles ====
- 2006: "Bailo"
- 2006: "Motivos"
- 2006: "Cada Puesta de Sol"

=== Solo singles ===
- 2003: "Nada Que Hablar"
- 2003: "Te dejé"

=== With Diecis1e7e ===
==== Albums ====
- 2008: Diecis1e7e

==== Singles ====
- 2007 "Identidad"
- 2007: "Euforia"
- 2007: "Inercia"
- 2007: "Gris"
- 2007: "Mañanas"
- 2007: "Hoy ya no es hoy"
- 2007: "Ayeres"
- 2007: "Instante"
- 2007: "Sentidos paralelos"
- 2007: "Bombas sobre mi"
- 2007: "Canción de luz"
- 2007: "Zöe"

=== Covers ===
- 2007: "Lunes por la madrugada" (Abuelos de la nada)
- 2007: "Persiana americana" (Soda Stereo)

=== With Coverheads ===
==== Albums ====
2012: Rock Cinco Estrellas

=== Singles ===
- 2012: Mujer de Fuego
- 2012: Nunca Sera Suficiente
- 2012: Creo En Milagros
- 2012: Que Me Queda
- 2012: Juego Cruel
- 2012: Flores Muertas
- 2012: Rebell Yell
- 2012: Aca Tenes
- 2012: Dame Tu Amor
- 2012: Helter Skelter
- 2012: Que Haces Por Dinero Nena?
- 2012: No Te Vayas Mal

=== With Foxley ===
==== Albums ====
2014: NUEVA GENERACIÓN

2018: WOW

=== Singles ===
- 2014: Donde Va a Parar
- 2014: Me Gusta
- 2014: Sin Vos
- 2014: La Paz
- 2014: Doble Vida
- 2014: Nueva Generación
- 2014: Derroche de Amor
- 2014: Siempre Estaba Ahí
- 2014: El Rey
- 2014: Primero Prefiero
- 2020: Nada
- 2020: Está vez ft: Emanero
- 2020: Mar del Plata
- 2021: Fluye
- 2021: Tanto y Mucho
