= Daniela Lalita discography =

Discography of Peruvian musician Daniela Lalita

Daniela Lalita albums discography
- EPs: 2
- Singles: 5
- Music videos: 6
- Other appearances: 18

The discography of New York-based, Peruvian-born musician Daniela Lalita consists of two EPs, five singles, three DJ mixes, six music videos, and 18 other appearances, in which she sometimes appears under the pseudonyms 'Lala8' or simply 'Lalita'.

Lalita started her music career in 2014. She signed with the British independent label Young, which is part of Beggars Group. Her debut EP Trececerotres from 2022 entered the UK Physical Singles Top 100. In 2026, three preceding singles were released from the EP TAC TAC, which was released on November 13, through the Orchard. Her debut full-length album is scheduled for release later that year.

== EPs ==
Title	EP details	Peak chart positions
Title	EP details	UK
Trececerotres	Released: September 16, 2022; Label: Young (YO258T); Format: 12-inch, digital download, streaming	94
TAC TAC	Released: November 13, 2026; Label: The Orchard/Inferno; Format: digital download, streaming	

== Singles ==
Title	Single details	Album
"Tenía Razón"	Released: July 12, 2022; Label: Young; Format: digital download, streaming	Trececerotres
"No Para"	Released: August 24, 2022; Label: Young; Format: digital download, streaming	Trececerotres
"Tiroteo"	Released: April 29, 2026; Label: The Orchard/Inferno; Format: digital download, streaming	TAC TAC
"Tac Tac"	Released: June 2, 2026; Label: The Orchard/Inferno; Format: digital download, streaming	TAC TAC
"Aurora"	Released: September 18, 2026; Label: The Orchard/Inferno; Format: digital download, streaming	TAC TAC

== DJ mixes ==
Title	DJ mix details	Ref.
"Daniela Lalita @ The Lot Radio 06-12-2017"	Released: June 12, 2017; Format: streaming	
"Daniela Lalita @ The Lot Radio 07:16:2018"	Released: July 16, 2018; Format: streaming	
"LRS fw 2019"	Released: September 10, 2018; Format: streaming	

== Other appearances ==
=== As lead artist ===
Title	Track details	Album	Ref.
"Swarovski Crystal Meth"	Released: September 17, 2016; Label: self-released; Format: streaming	Non-album singles	
"hmp"	Released: September 30, 2016; Label: self-released; Format: streaming	Non-album singles	
"El Bebe"	Released: May 12, 2017; Label: self-released; Format: streaming	Madre	
"Mi lucha"	Released: August 30, 2017; Label: self-released; Format: streaming	Non-album singles	
"el pica pica"	Released: February 26, 2018; Label: self-released; Format: streaming	Non-album singles	

=== As featured artist ===
Title	Year	Artist	Album	Ref.
"Toyota Man"	2019	Neon Indian	Non-album singles	
"AS Acá"	2020	Amnesia Scanner	Tearless	
"AS Tearless"	2020	Amnesia Scanner	Tearless	
"Kuvasz in Snow"	2020	Sega Bodega	Salvador	
"Premium Defects"	2021	FAKETHIAS & Lala8	Non-album singles	
"Drugs"	2021	Mura Masa	Curve 1	
"Sacrifices for the Greater Good"	2021	Bobby Krlic	Blue Beetle Soundtrack	
"Possession of a Weapon"	2023	Ashnikko	Weedkiller	
"Super Soaker"	2023	Ashnikko	Weedkiller	
"Love"	2023	Mura Masa	Non-album singles	
"Trenzas"	2024	Meth Math	Chupetones	
"Pinky Ring"	2024	TRISTÁN!	Music EP	
"Daniela's Song"	2024	Majidi. electric midi motoCrosz	music taught mankind to reason.	

== Music Videos ==
=== As lead artist ===
Title	Year	Director(s)	Link	Ref.
"Tenía Razón"	2022	Daniela Lalita	YouTube	
"No Para"	2022	Bradley Bell and Pablo Jones-Soler (Bradley & Pablo)	YouTube	
"Pisoteo"	2022	Daniela Lalita	YouTube	
"Atrás"	2022	Paul Gondry and Nate Boyce	YouTube	
"Trececerotres"	2023	Daniela Lalita	YouTube	
"Tiroteo"	2026	Daniela Lalita	YouTube	

=== As featured artist ===
Title	Year	Artist	Director(s)	Link	Ref.
"AS Acá"	2019	Amnesia Scanner	Hanna Nilsson and Rasmus Svensson (PWR Studio)	YouTube	
"Drugs"	2023	Mura Masa	Will and Ed Reids (The Reids)	YouTube	
"Trenzas"	2024	Meth Math	Winie Calvay and Asra Diogo-da-Silva	YouTube	
"Pinky Ring"	2024	Tristán!	Tristán Rodriguez and Martín Moreno (Fomotrauma)	YouTube	

== Film scores ==
=== Short films ===
Title	Year	Director(s)	Link	Ref.
"In Order to Endure Sin, the Slave Master Must Invest Capital for Eternity"	2017	Andre Bato	YouTube	
