= Daniela Lalita =

Peruvian musician, model, and artist

- Born: Daniela Czenstochowski; 1992 (age 33–34); Lima, Peru
- Education: Rhode Island School of Design; New York University
- Occupations: Singer-songwriter; producer; model; artist
- Years active: 2014–present
- Works: Discography
- Parents: Ilan Chester; Pilar Secada
- Musical career
- Genres: Folktronica; art pop; avant-pop; experimental electronic
- Instruments: Vocals; synthesizer
- Labels: Young; The Orchard/Inferno
- Website: danielalalita.com

Daniela Lalita (Spanish pronunciation: [daˈnjela laˈlita]); born 1992 as Daniela Czenstochowski; (Polish: [t͡ʂɛnstɔˈxɔfski], Spanish: [t͡ʃenstoˈxawski]) is a Peruvian musician, model, and artist. Around the age of 19, she moved to the United States to study apparel design at the Rhode Island School of Design and did several internships in the fashion industry. She debuted as a model at New York Fashion Week in 2015, then collaborated with Givenchy and Saint Laurent while appearing in international runway shows, magazines, and advertising campaigns.

In 2015, Lalita began studying music technology at New York University, where she was mentored by electronic music composer Morton Subotnick. Between 2016 and 2019, she released electronic music tracks on SoundCloud, performed as a DJ, and worked as a performance artist on interdisciplinary projects combining fashion, theater, film, and music. Her work frequently incorporates symbolic and psychological themes.

In 2022, she released her debut EP, Trececerotres, which entered the UK Physical Singles Top 100. Music videos were produced for all tracks; Lalita designed the costumes and directed several of the videos. The song "Tenía Razón" was featured on the soundtrack of FIFA 23. Since 2023, she has collaborated with Mura Masa and Ashnikko and has performed at international music festivals. Lalita directed the music video for the single "Tiroteo", which was released in 2026. Her second EP, TAC TAC, was released on November 13, 2026.

== Early life ==
Daniela Czenstochowski was born in 1992 in Lima, Peru, to Peruvian architect and former actress Pilar Secada and Venezuelan singer-songwriter and producer Ilan Chester. She grew up with her mother and grandmother in Lima.

From the ages of five to ten, Czenstochowski worked as a voice-over artist for television commercials and appeared in stage productions. She learned to play the piano as a child and studied ballet until the age of thirteen. Her mother, who had performed with several reggae and fusion bands, including as a chorist in La Liga del Sueño, often took her to musical performances, which had a formative influence on her. Her father, a follower of the Hare Krishna movement, introduced her to meditative kirtan chanting, a spiritual practice rooted in the voice.

== Career ==
=== 2010–2015: Design studies ===
Seal of the Rhode Island School of Design, Daniela Lalita's Alma mater

Around the age of 19, Lalita relocated from Lima to the United States to study apparel design at the Rhode Island School of Design. After graduating in 2014, she moved to Manhattan, New York. There, she interned with Sarah Gore-Reeves, the fashion director of Vogue México y Latinoamérica, and learned about the editorial side of the industry. She subsequently worked as a consultant for the fashion brand Eckhaus Latta, assisting in garment production and pattern development. In 2015, she collaborated with fashion designer Titi Guiulfo. Due to her growing interest in music, she applied her knowledge of fashion design to the creation of costumes for performances and music videos.

=== 2014–2018: Interest in music ===
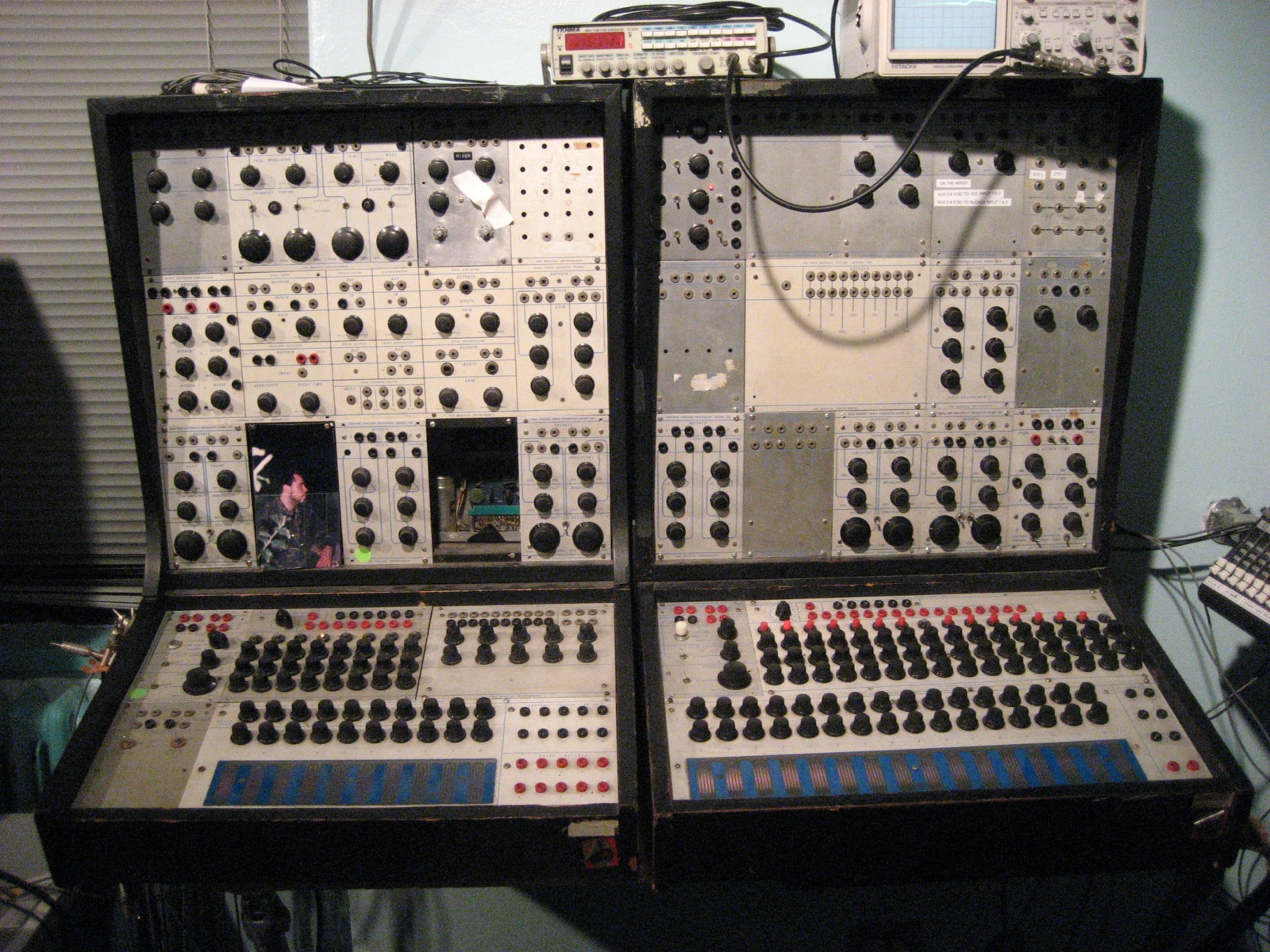
Buchla analog synthesizer at the New York University used by Daniela Lalita for her compositions

After completing her design studies, Lalita went to the NYU Steinhardt where she studied music technology. Her mentor was Morton Subotnick, a pioneer of electronic music who collaborated with engineer Don Buchla on one of the first analog synthesizers, which Buchla built to Subotnick's specifications. The modular synthesizer, which was named "Buchla" after him, is used by Lalita for her recordings.

She recorded her first track, "hmp", in 2014 and released it on SoundCloud in September 2016. The track was later used by director Lena Greene for the commercial work Beauty Papers Magazine X Comme Des Garçons X Ilan Rubin. In the following years, Lalita issued additional electronic music singles on the same platform and occasionally performed as a DJ.

=== 2015–2018: Experiences with film and performance art ===
In June 2015, Lalita narrated the episode "Daniela & Francesco" (S1 E6) in the TV series R.I.P., which was written and directed by Lena Greene and Lorraine Nicholson. She also collaborated with Coco Campbell on costume design for a stop-motion animated music video trilogy released in November 2015 for producer and DJ Tommy Trash. In February 2016, she provided the voice-over for the promotional film Introducing Fur by Ezra Ewen. In August of the same year, she participated in the Selkie Series with Ser Serpas and Gia Garison under the name "Swarovski Crystal Meth." This was a performance series curated by Alexandra Marzell at the National Sawdust in Brooklyn, presenting multidisciplinary works by emerging artists. Lalita composed music for the piece. In October 2016, she participated in a puppet show in Brooklyn alongside artists such as Rochelle Goldberg, Jacky Connolly, Ficus Interfaith, Martine Fougeron, and Veit Laurent Kurz and curated by Shelby Jackson and Paul Gondry. A puppet created by Lalita was later exhibited at the "Living Content Live" event, which was curated by Adriana Blidaru at Times Square, New York, in October 2018.

In October 2017, she presented Madre: A Disruptive Environment in New York, a multimedia performance piece developed in collaboration with choreographer Remy Maelen. She stated that she created this project to combine what she had learnt in apparel design with what she was currently learning in music technology. In Madre, she explores themes related to the archetypes of the "Great Mother", inspired by the work of Swiss psychiatrist and psychoanalyst Carl Jung. Lalita invited artists, actors, and models such as Grace Hartzel, Carly Mark, Martine Gutierrez, Lida Fox, along with her mother to take part in this work combining elements of fashion, film, theater, music, and visual art.

Lalita composed the score for In Order to Endure Sin, the Slave Master Must Invest Capital for Eternity, a short film directed by Andre Bato, which premiered at MoMA PS1 as part of a live performance by Hirakish and was released online by Dazed in November 2017. The following month, she starred in the horror short film Know Nothing, directed by Carly Mark. This film and photographs of her art performance Madre were part of the exhibition Vanquished by the Fickle Goddess, curated by Antonia Marsh and shown in Venice from February to March 2018.

=== 2019–2022: Guest appearances ===
Lalita appeared as a guest artist in several songs released between 2019 and 2021: The single "AS Acá" by deconstructed club artist duo Amnesia Scanner, the song "AS Tearless" on their album Tearless with composition and lyrics by Lalita, and the song "Premium Defects" by Fakethias, which opened a viral film for the fashion house Mugler. She opened for Caroline Polachek at the Warsaw club in Brooklyn in January 2020 and, in June 2022, appeared at the Sónar festival in Barcelona, supported by Amnesia Scanner.

=== 2022–2023: Debut EP Trececerotres ===
Lalita worked for five years on her debut EP Trececerotres, and released it on the label Young (Beggars Group) on September 16, 2022. The Spanish title is a reference to the apartment 1303 in Lima, where she lived with her mother and grandmother before moving to New York. The EP entered the UK Physical Singles Top 100 and received positive reviews, appearing on several year-end best-of lists for 2022. In critical reception, the work has frequently been associated with spirituality. Numéro described it as magical and melancholic, calling it "as bewitching as it is frightening". Lalita herself added:

"I think that there's a lot of darkness as well as lightness and as well as magic"; it is "ritualistic, vulnerable, sincere, honest, and raw".

The album was mastered by Joe LaPorta at Sterling Sound. The single "Tenía Razón", co-produced by Sega Bodega, was part of the influential FIFA 23 soundtrack. Lalita directed the music video for the song herself, released in July 2022. She also directed the music videos for two other songs on the EP: "Pisoteo", choreographed by Lourdes Leon and released in September 2022, and the title track "Trececerotres", which was released in February 2023.

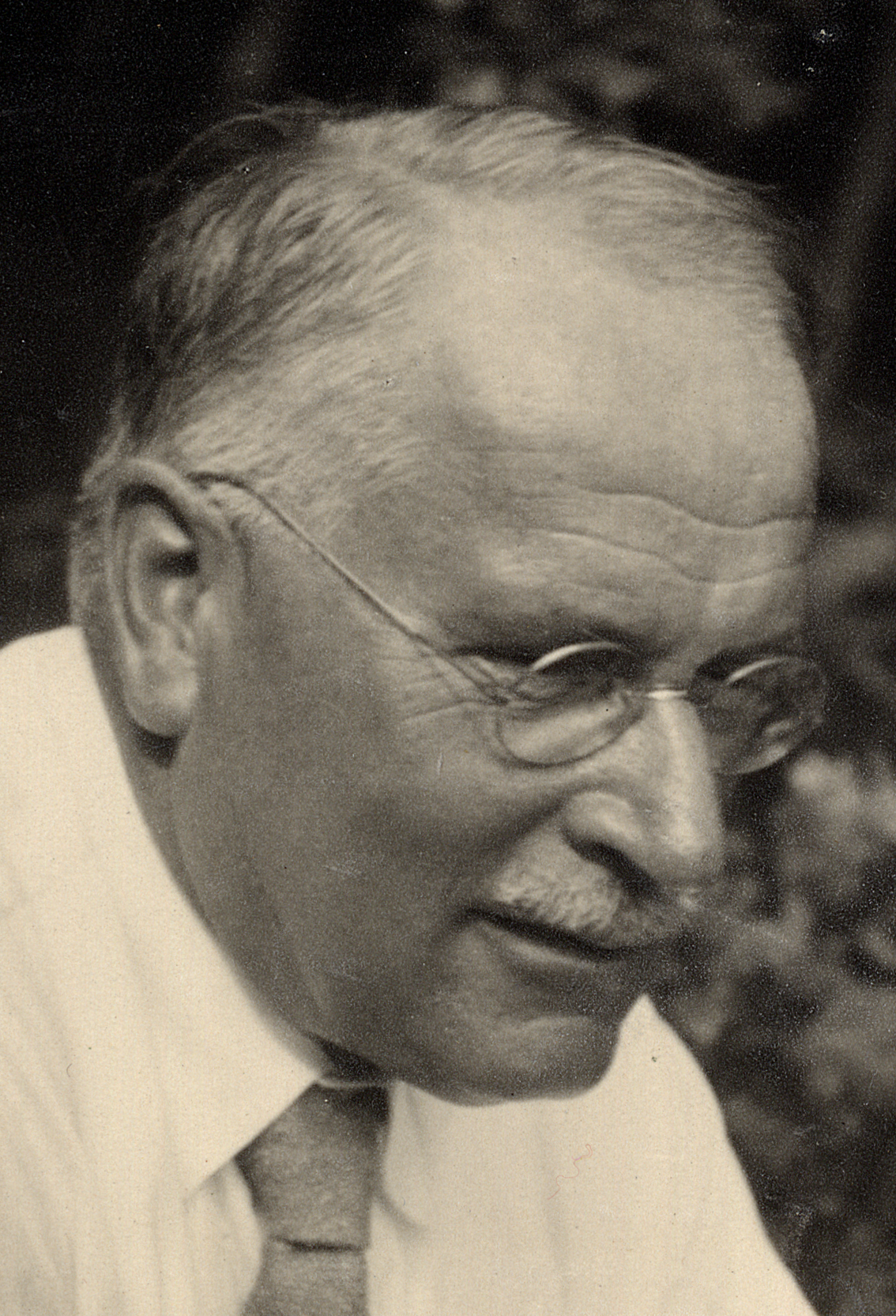
Daniela Lalita's works Madre and Trececerotres where inspired by the concept of the archetype of the "Great Mother" by Swiss psychiatrist and psychologist Carl Gustav Jung (1875-1961), c. 1935

=== 2023–2024: Further collaborations ===
Lalita was featured on the deep house singles "Drugs" (June 2023) and "Love" (September 2023) by Mura Masa. The first song also appeared on Mura Masa's album Curve 1, released in August 2024. Clash described it as "the perfect platform for Daniela Lalita's vocal, with the rising Peruvian figure – and Young label affiliate – supplying some finesse." The video in which she plays the leading role was named one of the six best creative music videos of 2023 by 1.4, an international annual award platform for creative short films. In July 2023, she performed her first live set at the Labirinto della Masone during the LOST Music Festival in Italy.

In August 2023, the song "Sacrifices for the Greater Good" by Bobby Krlic, featuring Lalita, was part of the soundtrack of the movie Blue Beetle. In the same month, she co-wrote two songs on Ashnikko's album Weedkiller, appearing as a featured vocalist on "Super Soaker" and producing "Possession of a Weapon". In February 2024, she was featured on Meth Math's experimental reggaetón album Chupetones on the song "Trenzas", and also appears in its music video.

=== 2024-present: EP TAC TAC and album preparation ===
In April 2024, Tristán!'s Music EP was released, which features Lalita on the art pop song "Pinky Ring". Tristán! is part of the Spanish label and collective Rusia-IDK, which Lalita contacted to work primarily as producers on her next album. In an interview with Mixmag in November 2024, Mura Masa said that he was also working on it as a producer. In September 2025, Lalita performed during Mietze Conte's DJ set in Brooklyn. She co-produced "Seoul Glow", which was included on Chase B's mixtape Be Very Afraid (Vol. 1), released on February 27, 2026.

The single "Tiroteo", written and produced by Lalita and Mura Masa, was released on April 29, 2026. Its music video, directed and edited by Lalita, was filmed in Peru, and features her mother in a supporting role. According to Rolling Stone, "Tiroteo" was one of the best new music releases of the week. In May 2026, Lalita was the DJ at the Met Gala afterparty to celebrate the opening of the Ray-Ban House. Additional singles, "Tac Tac"—written and produced by Lalita and Mietze Conte—and "Aurora" (feat. Dinamarca), were released on June 2 and September 18, 2026, respectively. Her second EP, TAC TAC, was released on November 13, 2026 through the Orchard. Blending experimental electronic, avant-pop, and Latin music, the five-track EP explores themes of intuition, delusion, pain, and transformation. The Fader writes that it's characterized by its gurgling basslines, intricate electronic percussion, and Lalita's soft, expressive vocals.

== Artistry ==
=== Musical style ===
Daniela Lalita's musical style has been described by critics as a fusion of several genres, including folktronica, art pop, experimental electronic, avant-pop, Latin pop, electroacoustic, industrial, dark pop, and experimental folk. It blends energetic club beats and pop elements, avoiding traditional verse-chorus structures, and is influenced by labels like PC Music and NUXXE, whose co-founder Sega Bodega co-produced Lalita's single "Tenía Razón". Lalita's music is seen as part of a global trend toward a return to tradition in electronic music, in which DJs and producers of club music are increasingly drawing on folkloric and centuries-old musical traditions.

=== Influences ===
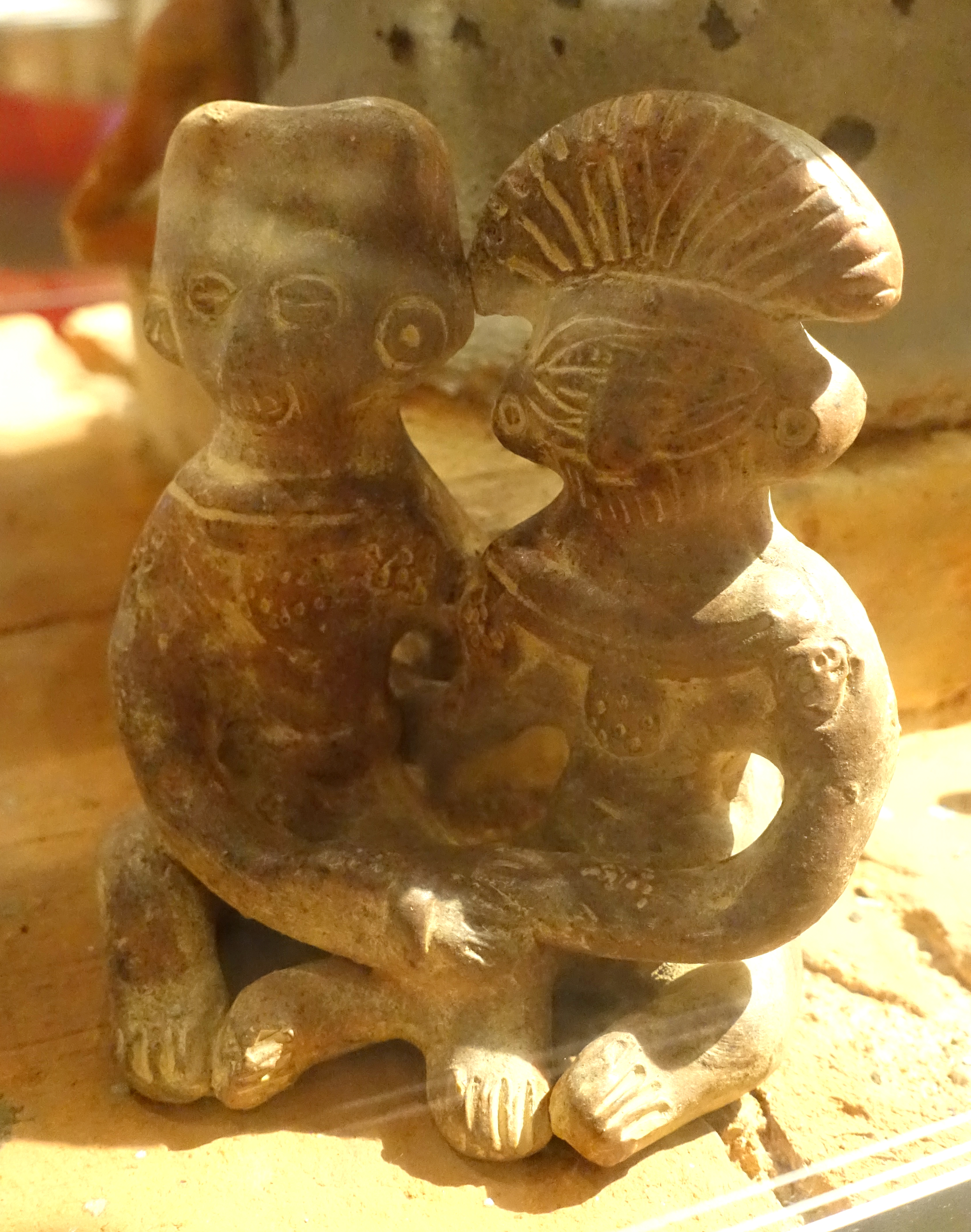
In Peru, Carl Jung's archetype of the "Great Mother" manifests itself in the worship of Pachamama, the earth and fertility goddess. She symbolizes the close connection to nature and reflects the collective unconscious of Andean culture. (Exhibit in the Kulenovic Collection - Karlskrona, Sweden)

Lalita cited a wide range of influences, including Carl Jung, Hildegard von Bingen, Morton Subotnick, Clive Barker, Amnesia Scanner, Aphex Twin, and many Warp releases from the 1990s. She described Jung as a particularly significant influence, especially his concept of the "Great Mother" archetype. In composing her own songs, she drew inspiration from Smithsonian Folkways recordings of ritual chants featured on the UNESCO album Ritual Chant and Music. For the EP TAC TAC, she cited film composers such as Vangelis, Jonny Greenwood, Eduard Artemyev, and Nino Rota as influences. She also said that she felt deeply connected to Peru through the songs her mother and grandmother sang during her childhood.

== Modeling ==
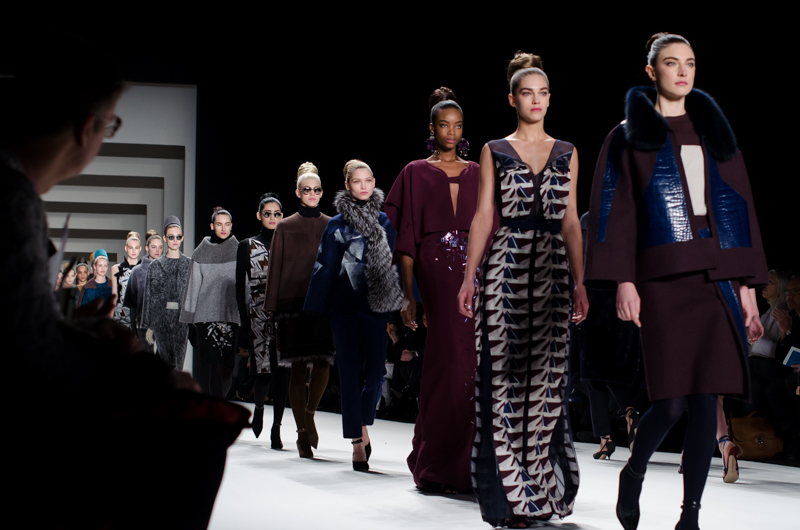
Haute couture fashion models walk the runway during New York Fashion Week, where Daniela Lalita began her modeling career at the SS16 show

Parallel to her artistic and musical development, Lalita has been modeling since 2015. During her design studies at Rhode Island School of Design, Lalita completed an internship at the fashion label VFiles. Two years later, in September 2015, she began her modeling career for the company at the Spring/Summer 2016 show during New York Fashion Week (NYFW). Between late 2015 and July 2016, Lalita appeared in photo shoots for The Cut. In August 2016, she was one of three models, along with Richie Shazam and Eloisa Santos, in the FW16 debut campaign film, which was filmed inside the Metropolitan Museum of Art for the New York label Músed. Cosas Perú named her the second best-dressed guest at the October 2016 MATE Gala, an annual fashion and charity event hosted by the Museo Mario Testino in Lima.

Vogue features Lalita in a video portrait as one of eight models breaking barriers in the fashion industry, and—as part of a feature on her small, New York-based modeling agency, No Agency—highlights that, in addition to her work as a model, she is also an artist and musician. In September 2017, she was part of the Eckhaus Latta SS18 show. A year later, she was cast by designer Raul Solis alongside Carly Mark for the SS19 show of his label LRS at NYFW. For this show, Lalita created a psychedelic DJ mix to accompany the collection musically. In addition to using her own music during a fashion show, she also incorporated elements of performance art into her runway fashion presentation at SS20 London Fashion Week in September 2019. Since then, she has increasingly focused on music as her primary form of artistic expression, while continuing to draw on her background in fashion design, film, and performance art, particularly in the creation of her music videos.

She has appeared at events such as the MTV Video Music Awards in September 2021, Paris Fashion Week in March and June 2022, London Fashion Week in September 2023, and Berlin Fashion Week in July 2025, where she appeared as an entertainer for the Berlin-based label Ottolinger. She worked with fashion house Givenchy in 2022 and appeared in a campaign film for Saint Laurent in February 2023. In September 2023, Lalita appeared on the cover of 10 Magazine's Fall/Winter issue in a portrait by Peruvian photographer Mariano Vivanco. She was featured in a Cosmopolitan article on the fashion colors of 2024 and appeared on the cover of Glamcult in July 2026 as well as on the cover of Coeval Magazine in October 2026.

== Personal life ==
Lalita is in a relationship with British artist George Rouy.

== Discography ==
=== EPs ===
- Trececerotres (2022)
- TAC TAC (2026)

=== Singles ===
- "Tenía Razón" (2022)
- "No Para" (2022)
- "Tiroteo" (2026)
- "Tac Tac" (2026)
- "Aurora" (2026)

== See also ==
- List of female electronic musicians
- List of experimental musicians
- List of folktronica artists
- List of art pop musicians
- List of avant-pop artists
