= TAC TAC =

EP by Daniela Lalita
- Released: November 13, 2026
- Genres: Experimental electronic; avant-pop; art-pop; Latin music; World music
- Length: 14:05
- Producer: Daniela Lalita

Daniela Lalita chronology
Trececerotres (2022)	TAC TAC (2026)

Singles from TAC TAC
- 1. "Tiroteo" Released: April 29, 2026; 2. "Tac Tac" Released: June 2, 2026; 3. "Aurora" Released: September 18, 2026

TAC TAC is an extended play (EP) by Peruvian musician Daniela Lalita, following her debut EP Trececerotres from 2022.

The EP was released on November 13, 2026, through the Orchard. It was mastered by Alec Ness, and was preceded by the singles "Tiroteo", "Tac Tac", and Aurora.

== Concept and production ==
According to Fame Magazine, TAC TAC explores themes including intuition, delusion, pain, and transformation, while the closing track, "La Bestia", points towards Lalita's subsequent album project.

The process used in the song "Tac Tac"—which involved layering only the plugins built into Ableton Live and using them in unconventional ways—shaped the production technique and sound design of the entire EP, which was created over the course of three years. The Fader writes that it's characterized by its gurgling basslines, intricate electronic percussion, and Lalita's soft, expressive vocals.

== Songs and reception ==
The first single from the EP, "Tiroteo", was co-written and co-produced by Mura Masa and released on April 29, 2026. The lyrics explore themes of emotional pain, loss and personal transformation, portraying suffering as a catalyst for renewal and rebirth. Critics highlighted the track's unconventional composition, atmospheric production and incorporation of huayno, a traditional Andean music genre. The song received further recognition through its inclusion in Pitchfork's Selects playlist, and Rolling Stone's weekly selection of the best new releases.

Tac Tac was released as the second single on June 2, 2026. It appears as the second track on the EP and was co-written and co-produced by the Vienna-based musician Mietze Conte, who is also featured as a second lead vocalist. Lalita described the lyrics as portraying the devil as a playful yet selfish child, exploring themes of apathy and innocent rebellion. The song received positive reviews for its playful, sinister atmosphere and blend of experimental and pop elements.

Aurora was released as the third single on September 18, 2026. It appears as the third track on the EP and was co-written and co-produced by the Madrid-based, Chilean-Swedish musician Dinamarca, who is also featured as a second lead vocalist. The song was praised by Bant Mag. for its angelic and spiritual sound and by FBi Radio for its rhythmic patterns and playful vocals. Teco Apple writes that it explores "the blurred lines between intuition and fantasy".

"Aqui", the fourth track on the EP, was co-written by Ron Kuivila. Beginning with an intimate, piano-centered sound that incorporates abstract and electronic elements, the track descends into a bodily, churning drum chant.

The EP closes with "La Bestia", a track combining dreamlike and cinematic elements with folk and electronic influences, exploring themes of body and identity.

== Music videos ==
A music video for the song "Tiroteo" was released alongside the single. It was directed and edited by Lalita, filmed in El Callao, Peru, and also features her mother, Pilar Secada, as part of the cast. Critics praised the video's black-and-white cinematography, choreography, Peruvian influences, and ritualistic imagery.

== Track listing ==
Trececerotres track listing
No.	Title	Writer(s)	Producer(s)	Length
1.	"Tiroteo"	Daniela Lalita; Mura Masa	Lalita; Mura Masa	2:17
2.	"Tac Tac"	Lalita; Mietze Conte	Lalita; Mietze Conte	1:54
3.	"Aurora"	Lalita; Dinamarca	Lalita; Dinamarca	2:44
4.	"Aqui"	Lalita; Ron Kuivila	Lalita	3:41
5.	"La Bestia"	Lalita	Lalita	3:29
Total length:				14:05

== Personnel ==
Credits were adapted from Tidal.

Musicians

- Daniela Lalita – lead vocals (1–5), synthesizer (1–5), programming (1–5)
- Mura Masa – programming (1)
- Mietze Conte – programming (2), lead vocals (2)
- Dinamarca - programming (3), lead vocals (3)

Technical

- Alec Ness – mastering engineer (1–5)
- Kayla Reagan – mixing engineer (1, 3, 5)
- Daniela Lalita – mixing engineer (2, 4)

Artwork and design

- Caroline Waxse – art production
- Sasha Glico - artwork
