= Veit Laurent Kurz =

German visual artist

Veit Kurz
- Born: 1985 (age 40–41); Erbach, Hesse, West Germany
- Education: Städelschule; Hochschule für Gestaltung Offenbach am Main
- Occupations: Visual artist; contemporary artist; sculptor; installation artist
- Website: megayaproject.com

Veit Laurent Kurz (born 1985) is a German visual artist based in Berlin. He creates installations that primarily consist of paintings, drawings, and sculptures, and later also incorporate video, sound, and text. His work is associated with post-technological approaches and explores constructed environments, combining organic motifs with synthetic materials and industrial surfaces.

He exhibits internationally, including at the Miguel Abreu Gallery, Le Magasin, the High Line, and Kunstverein Nürnberg, and was part of Produktion. Made in Germany Three (2017), a large-scale survey exhibition on contemporary art in Germany, organized by Kestner Gesellschaft, Kunstverein Hannover, and Sprengel Museum.

His work has been reviewed in publications including Artforum, Frieze, and Kunstkritikk, and has been featured in coverage of Gallery Weekend Berlin in Die Zeit.

== Education ==
Kurz studied at the Hochschule für Gestaltung Offenbach am Main from 2005 to 2009. He then attended the Städelschule in Frankfurt am Main from 2009 to 2012, where he studied fine arts under Michael Krebber.

== Career ==
Kurz began exhibiting in 2009. His installations frequently combine constructed environments with found or natural materials, a practice he has described as the assembly of hybrid systems reflecting relationships between bodies and environments.

In 2013, he collaborated with Anne Imhof at Portikus, which included the music performance of "Beautiful Balance". Kurz co-initiated the group exhibition S.O.A.P.Y. (Servants Order of Ancient Psychic Youth), which later developed into the collaborative project Vetjylien N'gyrz with Julien Nguyen.

Two ongoing projects, Herba-4 (2014–) and Corium (2021–), address themes related to environmental precarity and cross-border biopolitics. In an interview with The Blank, Kurz described his work as concerned with the interaction of ecological and psychological systems.

Kurz has developed a recurring fictional character, Der Dilldapp, adapted from a figure by German Romantic writer Clemens Brentano. The character was first created for Bed-Stuy Love Affair's presentation at the Whitney Museum of American Art in New York (2015), and also appears in later works, most notably in The Dilldapp Memorial (2019/2020).

In 2016, Kurz participated in a puppet show in Brooklyn alongside artists such as Rochelle Goldberg, Jacky Connolly, Ficus Interfaith, Martine Fougeron, and Daniela Lalita. He collaborated with Stefan Tcherepnin at MoMA PS1 as part of the "Sunday Sessions" program.

He subsequently collaborated with Tcherepnin, and Goldberg in the context of Reading International in 2017. Kurz participated with his installation "RElife" in Made in Germany Drei at Kestner Gesellschaft, Hannover. He transforms the romantic idyll of landscapes into whimsical, fairy-tale-like scenes. His biotope-like sculptures are interwoven with elements of architecture and design. Thematically, he links unbridled consumption with ecological disaster, treating both as two sides of the same coin.

In 2019, Monopol magazine listed Kurz's solo exhibition Nutrition and Drama at Isabella Bortolozzi Galerie among the highlights of Gallery Weekend Berlin.

Kurz presented a solo exhibition titled Thyroxin (2020) at Weiss Falk Gallery in Basel. An exhibition text notes references to the Chernobyl disaster and describes imagery related to radiation, poisoning, and psychological experiences such as anxiety and trauma. His solo exhibitions include Sequence 7: One Work, One Week at Miguel Abreu Gallery, New York (2020).

The influence of the history of experimental and organic architecture on Kurz's practice is visible in Winterfest: An Exhibition of Arts and Crafts, shown at the Aspen Art Museum in 2021.

In 2023, he was part of the exhibition Old Veins, New Tunnels at Galerie Heidi in Berlin, alongside Alicja Wahl, Alina Szapocznikow and Leidy Churchman.

Kurz's practice of world-building that draws from German folklore, psychology, and contemporary environmental crises is visible in the exhibition Art & Ecology (2025) at the contemporary art gallery What Pipeline in Detroit.

Along with eight other artists, Kurz is featured in the exhibition ibid. (2026) at the Kunstverein Nürnberg. In the same year, Kurz presented Green Sanctuary (C.O.T.B.) at Haus am Waldsee in Berlin, exploring ecological relationships and cultural ideas of nature through the imagined perspective of bees. The exhibition is part of his ongoing Circle of the Bee project.

== Major works ==
Kurz has exhibited in both solo and group exhibitions in Europe and the United States. Major installations include:

=== Herba-4 ===
Herba-4 is a fictional healing elixir conceptualized in 2014 that appears in sculptural dispensaries, mock advertising campaigns, and immersive installations. The project has been interpreted as a critique of greenwashing and corporate wellness culture. It has been exhibited at Le Magasin CNAC Grenoble (2017), Städtische Galerie Delmenhorst (2020), Kunsthalle Gießen (2021), and Kunstverein Dortmund (2022).

=== The Dilldapp cycle ===
The Dilldapp cycle is a recurring mythology in Kurz's work that adapts Clemens Brentano's romantic character into a contemporary fictional figure. It appears across sculptural, narrative, and performative formats, including The Dilldapp Memorial (2019/2020).

=== Corium ===
Corium (2021) is a project presented at the Into Nature – New Energy biennial, and exhibited at Kunsthalle Lingen, where it was shown in the context of artistic responses to energy production and ecological transformation. The work includes an installation and a video component and takes its title from the lava-like material formed during a nuclear reactor meltdown.

=== Metaphors & Mutations / Lava Trilogie ===
Lava Trilogie is a publication released in 2019 by Kunstverein Nürnberg – Albrecht Dürer Gesellschaft in conjunction with the exhibition Metaphors & Mutations. The project explores symbolic associations between volcanic terrain and nuclear energy.

== Reception ==
Kurz's work has been discussed in several contemporary art publications. In Artforum, his projects have been interpreted as drawing on mythological and narrative structures within contemporary contexts. Writing in Frieze, critics have highlighted the hybrid character of his installations, combining artificial materials with organic imagery and spatial staging. In Kunstkritikk, his work has been described as extending beyond conventional exhibition formats, while other reviews have emphasized its use of complex narrative systems and immersive environments.

== Representation ==
- Isabella Bortolozzi Gallery, Berlin
- Oskar Weiss Gallery (former Weiss Falk Gallery), Basel

== Publications ==
- Kurz, Veit Laurent, and Stefan Tcherepnin. Diary of Steit. Detroit: What Pipeline, 2015.
- Kurz, Veit Laurent, and Levi Easterbrooks. "The Bavarian Vampire 1–4." In Starship 17. Edited by Gerry Bibby, Nikola Dietrich, Martin Ebner, Ariane Müller, and Henrik Olesen. 2018.
- Kurz, Veit Laurent. "An Artist's Guide to the Best in Berlin, Basel and Beyond in 2018." Frieze, December 24, 2018.
- Kurz, Veit Laurent. "Scattered Impressions from an Archive." In Klima #06 – Mutabilities, edited by Loucia Carlier, Alicia Reymond, and Antonine Scali Ringwald, 84–88. Les Presses du réel, 2024.

== Awards ==
In 2020, Kurz received the 42nd Matteo Olivero Award, and the 4th Battaglia Foundry Sculpture Prize.
