= Ilan Chester =

Israeli-Venezuelan musician and composer

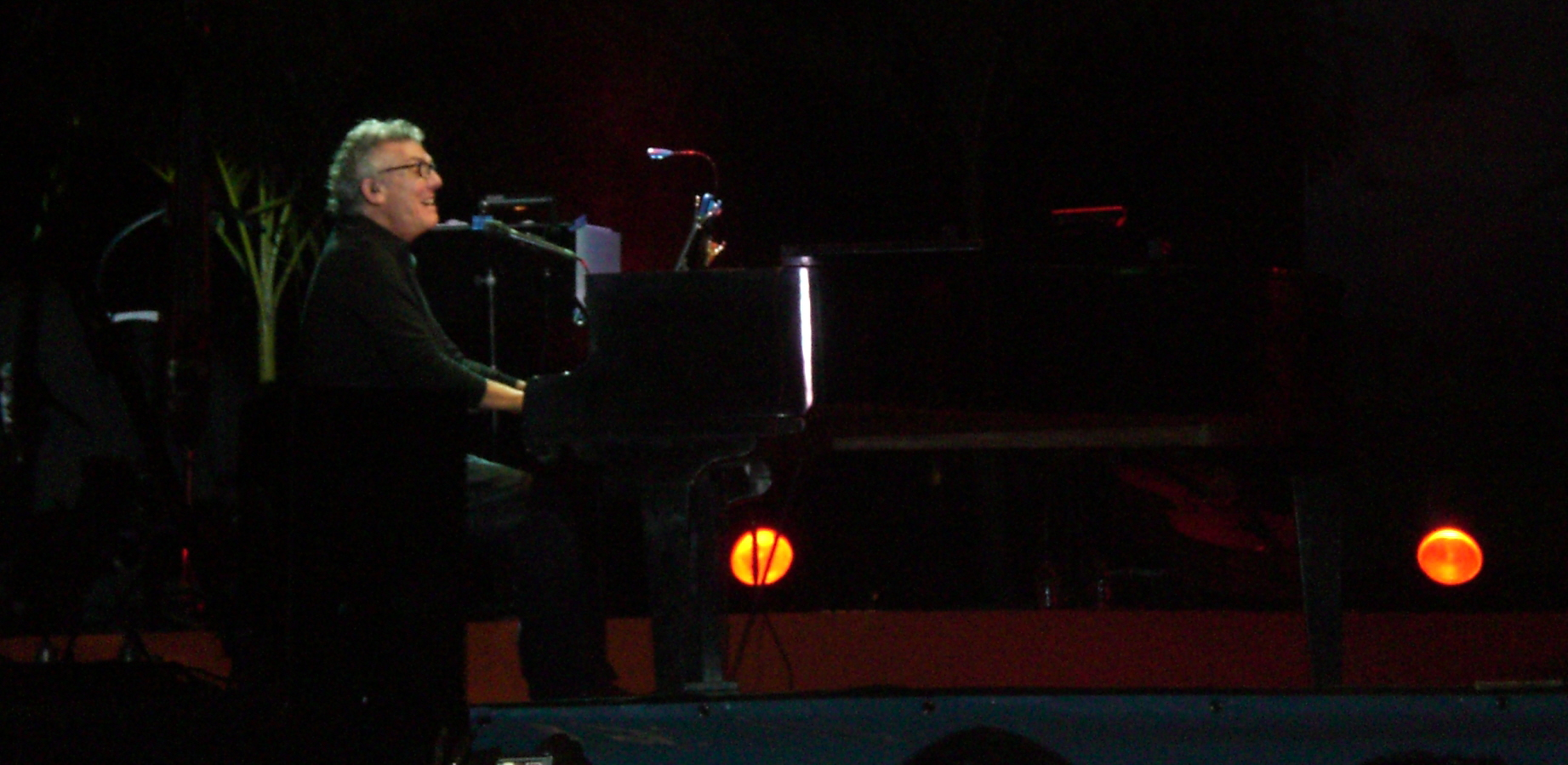
- Born: Ilan Czenstochowski Schaechter; July 30, 1952 (age 74); Jaffa, Tel Aviv, Israel
- Occupations: Musician; singer; songwriter; record producer
- Years active: 1965–present
- Children: Daniela Lalita
- Musical career
- Origin: Caracas, Venezuela
- Genres: Latin pop; rock; latin ballad
- Instruments: Vocals; piano; keyboard
- Labels: Color; Corporación Los Ruices; Philips; Sonográfica; Sony Music
- Website: ilanchesteroficial.com

Ilan Chester; born July 30, 1952 as Ilan Czenstochowski Schaechter; (Polish: [t͡ʂɛnstɔˈxɔfski], Spanish: [t͡ʃenstoˈxawski]) is a Venezuelan singer-songwriter, composer, pianist, and music producer of Israeli origin. Active since the 1970s, he has released over thirty albums and is considered one of the most influential figures in Venezuelan pop music. His work blends pop and rock with Venezuelan folk traditions and spiritual influences. He won a Latin Grammy Award in 2010 for the six-CD anthology Tesoros de la Música Venezolana ("Treasures of Venezuelan Music") and received a Latin Grammy Lifetime Achievement Award in 2017.

== Early life ==
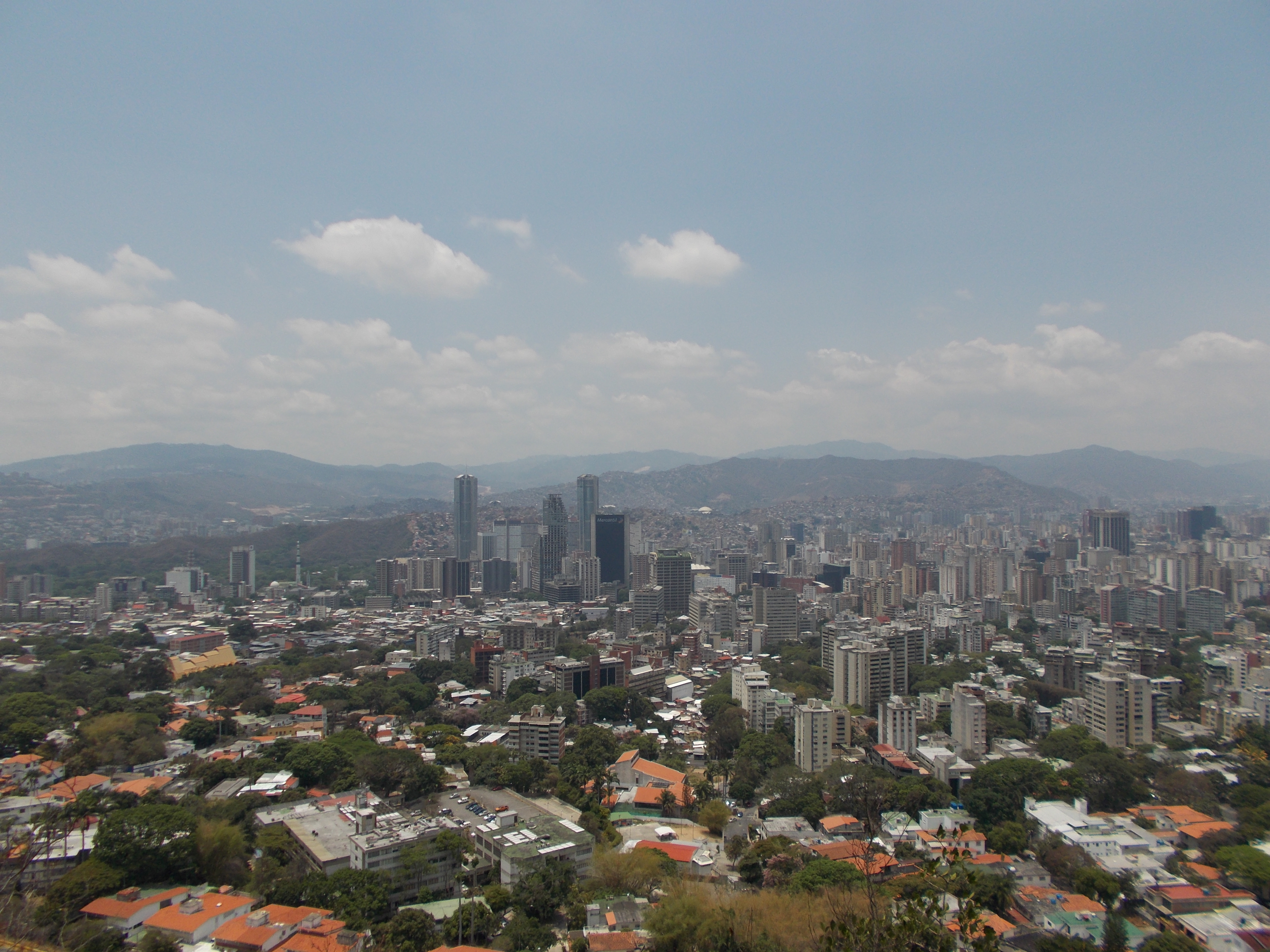
Caracas viewed from Cerro El Ávila. Illan Chester grew up in Caracas, and his 1983 song "Canto al Ávila" became closely associated with the city.

Chester was born in Jaffa, Tel Aviv, Israel, to Ashkenazi Jewish parents of Polish descent. In 1953, his father, Walter Czenstochowski Hecht (1924–1997), moved the family to Venezuela on a diplomatic assignment. Chester grew up in Caracas, learned to play the piano at an early age, and performed publicly as a child. His musical development was influenced by classical music, traditional Jewish and European melodies, Venezuelan folk music, Caribbean rhythms, American R&B, and British rock.

== Career ==
=== 1965–1981: Early career ===
Chester began his career in the second half of the 1960s as part of the bands Los Rítmicos and Los Trams. In the 1970s, he played with various bands from Caracas, including Way (1970–1972), and Azúcar, Cacao y Leche (1971–1972). Chester lived in England in the late 1970s, where he recorded two albums in English with the band Ananta: Night and Daydream\Wheels of Time (1978) and Songs from the Future (1980). Back in Venezuela, his band Melao opened for Queen at the Poliedro de Caracas during The Game Tour in 1981.

=== 1983–1995: Solo career ===
Chester gained broader recognition with his solo album Canciones de Todos los Días (1983); songs such as "Canto al Ávila" became closely associated with Caracas and helped establish his national reputation. Between 1984 and 1990, he released a number of albums, including Amistad (1984), Ilan Chester (Sólo Faltas Tú) (1985), Al pie de la letra (1987), and Opus n.° 10 (1990) that blended pop and rock structures with Venezuelan folk elements. In 1992, he released the Latin pop album Un Mundo Mejor. It includes his recording of the ballad "Todo Mi Corazón", written for Mexican singer Yuri, which later became an international charting single. He followed this with Terciopelo in 1994, a pop-rock album recorded with international session musicians.

=== 1996–present: Late career ===
In 1996, Chester retired from live performances but returned three years later. In 1998, he released Bhakti (Devotional Chants from India) and Cancionero del amor venezolano, a collection of Venezuelan romantic standards that proved commercially successful. The Christmas album Corazón Navideño (2001) later achieved platinum status. In 2004, he released the album Así. His large-scale project Tesoros de la Música Venezolana (2009) brought together numerous guest artists in a six-CD collection that offered a comprehensive overview of Venezuelan musical traditions. The project won a Latin Grammy Award in 2010 and is considered one of his most significant works. In 2017, he received a Latin Grammy Lifetime Achievement Award, honoring his significant contributions to Latin music. After a career spanning almost six decades in the music industry, he additionally began working as a lecturer on ancient Indian yoga culture. In July 2026, Chester collaborated with Ronald Borjas on a new version of his song "Pa'lante", released in support of humanitarian relief efforts following the 2026 Venezuela earthquakes.

== Musical style ==
Chester's music blends pop and rock elements with Venezuelan folk music influences, jazz harmonies, and Afro-Caribbean rhythms. His later orchestral and choral arrangements increasingly focused on Venezuelan folk traditions and religious themes from the Vedic tradition.

== Spiritual life ==
In the early 1970s, Chester became associated with the International Society for Krishna Consciousness. In 1973 he was initiated by A. C. Bhaktivedanta Swami Prabhupada and received the spiritual name Havi Das. He later traveled to India and has remained active within the Vaishnava Bhakti tradition. Chester has cited Krishna consciousness as an important source of personal and artistic inspiration.

== Personal life ==
Chester lived primarily in Venezuela and also had residences in India and Florida, USA. He has seven children, including Peruvian musician, model, and artist Daniela Lalita, from his relationship with former actress Pilar Secada. He was married to Mercedes Mayorca from 2003 until her death in 2018.

== Reception and Legacy ==
Chester is widely regarded as a key figure in Venezuelan pop music, and is known as the "Musician of Venezuela". His recordings of his own compositions shaped the country's urban pop sound in the 1980s, while his later projects dedicated to preserving cultural heritage contributed to a renewed interest in traditional Venezuelan repertoire.

== Discography ==
=== Studio albums (with Azúcar, Cacao y Leche) ===
Release	Album	Label
1971	Azúcar, Cacao y Leche	Top Hits – La Discoteca
1972	Azúcar, Cacao y Leche Vol. II	Top Hits – La Discoteca

=== Studio albums (with Ananta) ===
Release	Album	Label
1978	Night and Daydream/Wheels of Time	Touchstone Sound
1980	Songs from the Future	Touchstone Sound
1982	Summer	A.I.C.K.

=== Studio albums (with Melao) ===
Release	Album	Label
1981	Nuestra Magia	Corporación Los Ruices

=== Studio albums ===
Release	Album	Label
1979	Por Principio... Fin	Color/Corporación Los Ruices
1983	Canciones de Todos los Días	Philips/Sonográfica
1984	Amistad	Philips/Sonográfica
1985	Ilan Chester (Sólo Faltas Tú)	Philips/Sonográfica
1987	Al Pie de la Letra	Sonográfica
1990	Opus #10	CBS/Sonográfica
1992	Un Mundo Mejor	Sony Music/Sonográfica
1994	Terciopelo	Sony Music
1998	Cancionero del Amor Venezolano	Independent
1998	Bhakti	Alcione
1999	Ofrenda para un Niño	Independent
2000	Cancionero del Amor Venezolano II	Independent
2001	Corazón Navideño	Latin World
2002	Ilan Canta Onda Nueva	Independent
2003	Cancionero del Amor Puertorriqueño	Independent
2004	Así	Sonográfica
2007	Cancionero del Amor Venezolano III	Independent
2013	Symphony of the Soul	Independent

=== Live albums ===
Release	Album	Label
1988	Ilan en Vivo	Sonográfica
1995	Ilan Chester en Vivo	Sony Music
2000	Ilan C. en Vivo (Gira Nac. Amor Vzlano)	CD Manía El Nacional
2000	Sinfónico – en Vivo	Independent
2007	Franco de Vita & Ilan Chester en Concierto (En Vivo)	Sonográfica

=== Compilations ===
Release	Album	Label
1991	Lo Mejor de Ilan Chester	Sonográfica
1991	CD Colección Ilan Chester	Sonográfica
1993	De Colección	PolyGram/Polydor
1994	De Colección Vol. 2	Sonográfica
1998	CD Colección	Sonográfica
1999	32 Grandes Éxitos (Serie 32)	Sonográfica/Universal
2000	Ilan Chester: El Músico de Venezuela	CD Manía/El Nacional
2001	Solo Éxitos	Universal/Sonográfica
2003	20 Éxitos de Ilan Chester (Lo Máximo)	Sonográfica
2006	Hits	EMI International
2007	Franco & Ilan en Concierto (Lo Máximo)	Sonográfica
2009	Tesoros de la Música Venezolana	Últimas Noticias
2013	Todo Mi Corazón	Orosound Records
2015	Solo Éxitos (Serie Premium)	Sonográfica
2016	A Pasarla Bien	SG Music
2016	Las Historias del Músico	SG Music

== See also ==
- Music of Venezuela
