= Tiroteo (Daniela Lalita song) =

Single by Daniela Lalita
- Language: Spanish
- Released: April 29, 2026
- Genre: Latin; electronic; pop
- Length: 2:18
- Label: The Orchard/Inferno
- Songwriters: Daniela Lalita; Mura Masa
- Producers: Daniela Lalita; Mura Masa

Daniela Lalita singles chronology
| "No Para" (2022) | "Tiroteo" (2026) | "Tac Tac" (2026) |

Music video
- "Tiroteo" on YouTube

"Tiroteo" (English: "Gunfire") is a song by Peruvian musician Daniela Lalita, released on April 29, 2026. It was written and produced by her and Mura Masa. Lalita directed and edited the music video for the Latin electronic pop song, which was filmed in Peru. The visual style and performance are described as fitting its ritualistic nature.

== Background ==
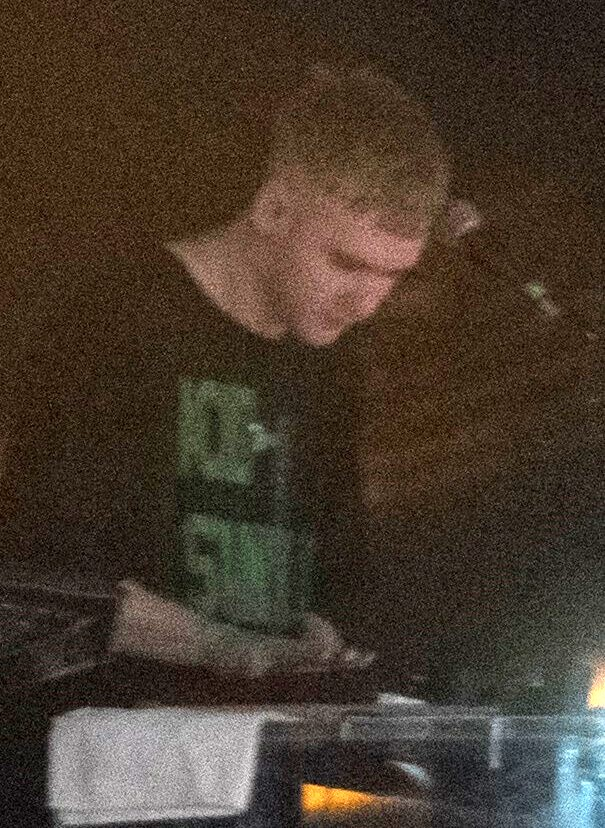
"Tiroteo" was co-written and co-produced by British record producer Mura Masa.

In 2023, Daniela Lalita collaborated with Mura Masa on the singles "Drugs" and "Love". She also appeared in the music video for "Drugs", later included on Mura Masa's album Curve 1. In a 2024 interview with Mixmag, Mura Masa said that Lalita was among the few artists he continued to produce for regularly.

== Production and composition ==
"Tiroteo" by Daniela Lalita
An excerpt from "Tiroteo" (English: "Gunfire") in which the song's title is rendered onomatopoetically ("T-t-t-t-tracatata") and integrated into the rhythm, illustrating the track's playful use of percussive vocalization within its Latin electronic style.

"Tiroteo" was written and produced by Lalita and Mura Masa. Kayla Reagan mixed the track, and mastering was completed by Alec Ness.

Musically, the song combines Latin, electronic, and pop music influences, and has been described by critics as a tribal electro and Latin pop track. It is composed in D minor, set in common time, and has a tempo of 150 beats per minute. Its chord progression follows Dm–Gm–Dm. Critics highlighted the song's atmospheric production and hypnotic rhythms.

== Lyrics ==
Tiroteo is about finding empowerment by using the pain of loss and catastrophe as a dissolving element that allows oneself to die, regenerate, and be born again with the use of one's own ammunition.

— Daniela Lalita, Fame Magazine

Fame Magazine writes: "The track doesn't resist suffering. It uses it as fuel." Lalita herself explains that, while writing the lyrics, she drew inspiration from how caterpillars use their own enzymes to break themselves down inside their cocoons, creating a nutrient-rich mass from which a completely new insect is formed. Teco Apple interpreted the song as exploring themes of emotional pain and rebirth through letting go of the past, whereas FM4 described it as turning a broken heart into a fresh start. Regarding the music video, Office Magazine notes that the symbolic choreography complements the expressive lyrics.

== Release and reception ==
"Tiroteo" was released on April 29, 2026. The Fader compared the song to Rosalía's "Malamente" and described it as a dance-oriented track. Fame Magazine wrote that, in contrast to Lalita's previous release Trececerotres, the single introduces a heavier artistic direction, incorporating ritualistic themes of transformation. In contrast, FBi Radio viewed the track as lighter and more upbeat than material from Trececerotres, and Triple J attributes this to the influence of Mura Masa.

Several reviewers emphasized the song's unconventional composition and production, particularly its incorporation of huayno, a traditional Andean music genre. Diffus described "Tiroteo" as tense and atmospheric, noting its departure from conventional pop songwriting. Critics also pointed to its irregular sense of timing and the influence of Lalita's former mentor, Morton Subotnick. FM4 viewed the song's caterpillar-to-butterfly imagery as a metaphor for rebirth. "Tiroteo" later reached number one on the station's FM4 Charts.

"Tiroteo" was featured in the Pitchfork Selects playlist. Rolling Stone named the track one of the week's best new releases, while Numéro ranked the music video among the best of May 2026.

== Music video ==
Daniela Lalita's mother, Pilar Secada, inside a submarine in a ritualistic scene from the black-and-white music video for "Tiroteo"

The music video for "Tiroteo" was released alongside the single. It was directed and edited by Lalita, filmed in El Callao, Peru, and also features her mother, Pilar Secada, as part of the cast. Critics praised the video's black-and-white cinematography, choreography, Peruvian influences, and ritualistic imagery.

== Credits and personnel ==
Credits were adapted from Tidal.

- Daniela Lalita – lead vocals, songwriter, producer
- Mura Masa – songwriter, producer
- Kayla Reagan – mixing engineer
- Alec Ness – mastering engineer
