= List of avant-pop artists =

The following is a list of notable avant-pop artists. Individuals are listed by surname.

== List ==
=== A ===
- A.R. Kane
- Allie X
- Tori Amos
- Laurie Anderson
- Animal Collective
- Fiona Apple
- Arca
- Atlas Sound
- Aurora
- Autechre

=== B ===
- Bad Brains
- The Beach Boys
- Beck
- Belly
- Björk
- Emily Blue
- David Bowie (between 1977–79)
- Lester Bowie
- Kate Bush
- The Byrds

=== C ===
- Camille
- Cardiacs
- Charli XCX
- Clinic
- Cobrah
- Coil

=== D ===
- Terence Trent D'Arby
- Depeche Mode
- Devo

=== E ===
- Eartheater
- Dorian Electra
- Brian Eno
- Enya

=== F ===
- The Feelies
- FKA Twigs
- The Flaming Lips

=== G ===
- Gauntlet Hair
- Githead
- Genesis
- Genesis P-Orridge
- GFOTY
- Grimes
- Paul Grimstad

=== H ===
- Here We Go Magic
- The High Llamas
- Holly Herndon
- Jenny Hval

=== J ===
- Grace Jones
- Daniel Johnston

=== K ===
- KÁRYYN
- Kelela
- Konstrakta
- Fela Kuti

=== L ===
- Daniela Lalita
- John Lennon and Yoko Ono

=== M ===
- Maneige
- John Maus
- Memory Cassette
- Mercury Rev
- Mis-Teeq
- Momus
- My Bloody Valentine
- Róisín Murphy

=== O ===
- Frank Ocean
- Of Montreal
- The Olivia Tremor Control
- Orchestral Manoeuvres in the Dark
- Os Mutantes

=== P ===
- Penguin Cafe Orchestra
- Ariel Pink
- Caroline Polachek
- The Pop Group
- P.J. Proby

=== R ===
- The Residents
- Rosalía
- Roxy Music (early records)

=== S ===
- Rina Sawayama
- Sevdaliza
- Shygirl
- SOPHIE
- Slapp Happy
- Slayyyter
- Spookey Ruben
- Jack Stauber
- St. Vincent
- Stavely Makepeace
- Stereolab
- The Sugarcubes
- A Sunny Day in Glasgow

=== T ===
- Talk Talk
- Talking Heads
- Trip Shakespeare
- Tune-Yards
- Tycho

=== V ===
- The Velvet Underground

=== W ===
- Scott Walker
- Was (Not Was)
- Ween
- Kanye West
- Brian Wilson (between 1965–67)
- Will Wood
- Win

=== X ===
- XTC

=== Y ===
- Yes

=== Z ===
- Frank Zappa

== See also ==
- Art pop
- Experimental pop
- Outsider music
- Avant-funk
- Vaporwave
