= No Para =

Single by Daniela Lalita

from the album Trececerotres
- Language: Spanish
- Released: August 24, 2022
- Studio: Sterling Sound, Edgewater, NJ
- Genre: Folktronica; art pop; avant-pop
- Length: 3:31
- Label: Young
- Songwriters: Daniela Lalita; Miguel Ballumbrosio
- Producer: Daniela Lalita

Daniela Lalita singles chronology
"Tenía Razón" (2022)	"No Para" (2022)	"Tiroteo" (2026)

Music video
- "No Para" on YouTube

"No Para" (English: "Do Not Stop") is a song by Peruvian musician Daniela Lalita. It was released on August 24, 2022, through Young as the second single from her debut EP Trececerotres (2022). The song was written by Lalita and Miguel Ballumbrosio.

== Recording and composition ==
"No Para" was recorded at Sterling Sound. Daniela Lalita co-wrote and produced the track, providing vocals and performing on a Buchla synthesizer. Additional programming and audio engineering were handled by Alex Epton. Mixing was completed by Gabriel Schuman. Mastering was carried out by Joe LaPorta at Sterling Sound.

The song is set in common time with a very fast tempo of 176 beats per minute. It is composed in the key of F♯m and follows a chord progression of C♯–F♯m–D–Bm. It features an Afro-Peruvian cajón, played by Miguel Ballumbrosio. The multifaceted vocal passages form the foundation of the track and the song's dark atmosphere is enhanced by minimalist and tribal electronics.

== Release and reception ==
Following its release on August 24, 2022, through Young, "No Para" was included in District Magazine's "Top 10 Tracks", the publication's weekly roundup of notable new music, in a list of songs of the year by Swiss newspaper Der Bund, and in a list of 100 songs of 2022. According to Remezcla, the song combines prominent vocals with a Buchla-based electronic arrangement and choral textures, reflecting Lalita's compositional approach. Acero highlighted Lalita's vocal range and emotional intensity. In the interview with the magazine, Lalita described how an unintentionally audible moment of vulnerability became an integral part of the work and central to the artistic intention of seeking emotional authenticity and personal understanding.

== Music video ==
The music video for "No Para" was directed by Bradley & Pablo and filmed at a volcanic site near Arequipa, Peru, at an altitude of approximately 16,000 feet above sea level. It features Lalita dressed in her own hand-sewn garments, re-enacting a ritual she had performed months earlier at the same location. Lalita has described the setting as being significant to her grandmother's worldview.

== Credits and personnel ==
- Daniela Lalita – lead vocals, synthesizer, programming
- Alex Epton – programming
- Miguel Ballumbrosio – cajón
- Joe LaPorta – mastering engineer
- Gabriel Schuman – mixing engineer
- Alex Epton – audio engineer
