= List of folktronica artists =

This is a list of artists classified as folktronica, a genre of indie electronic music comprising various elements of folk music and electronica; often incorporating hip hop, electronic or dance rhythms.

== Folktronica artists ==
- Alex G
- Alt-J
- Ásgeir
- Avicii
- Bat for Lashes
- Bibio
- Björk
- Boards of Canada
- Bon Iver
- The Books
- Bunt
- Caribou (fka Manitoba)
- Detektivbyrån
- Cosmo Sheldrake
- Eivør
- Ellie Goulding
- Four Tet
- Go_A
- Goldfrapp
- Hood
- Jakokoyak
- Daniela Lalita
- Lamb
- Madonna (Ray of Light-American Life eras)
- Juana Molina
- Beth Orton
- Maggie Rogers
- Mid-Air Thief
- Minute Taker
- Múm
- Patrick Wolf
- Sylvan Esso
- Talkdemonic
- Tanxugueiras
- Tunng
- Wintergatan
- James Yuill
- Yuko
