= Another Life (Amnesia Scanner album) =

Studio album by Amnesia Scanner
- Released: 7 September 2018
- Genre: Experimental
- Length: 39:29
- Label: PAN
- Producer: Amnesia Scanner

Amnesia Scanner chronology
AS Truth (2017)	Another Life (2018)	Tearless (2020)

Singles from Another Life
- 1. "AS Chaos" Released: 13 April 2018; 2. "AS AWOL" Released: 20 July 2018; 3. "AS Too Wrong" Released: 25 August 2018

Another Life is the debut studio album by Finnish electronic music duo Amnesia Scanner. It was released on 7 September 2018, by PAN.

== Critical reception ==
Professional ratings
Aggregate scores
Source	Rating
Metacritic	80/100
Review scores
Source	Rating
AllMusic	3.5/5 stars
Exclaim!	9/10
Pitchfork	7.5/10
PopMatters	8/10
Resident Advisor	4.0/5
Tiny Mix Tapes	4.5/5 stars

Another Life was met with "generally favorable" reviews from critics. At Metacritic, which assigns a weighted average rating out of 100 to reviews from mainstream publications, this release received an average score of 80 based on nine reviews. Aggregator Album of the Year gave the release a 83 out of 100 based on a critical consensus of seven reviews.

Maya-Roisin Slater of Resident Advisor reviewed "Another Life is a complete sensory overload you can't turn away from." Paul Simpson of AllMusic said: "Another Life is filled with the battering beats and showering feedback common to the duo's previous recordings, but they're molded into strange, sometimes grotesque pop songs. Jarring, mutilated electronic vocals are at the center of most of the album's songs, and the lyrics seem to celebrate technology while also expressing the horror of having no escape from it."

== Track listing ==
All tracks written by Amnesia Scanner.

No.	Title	Length
1.	"AS Symmetribal"	4:28
2.	"AS Unlinear" (featuring Pan Daijing)	2:12
3.	"AS A.W.O.L."	3:29
4.	"AS Another Life"	3:24
5.	"AS Daemon"	3:09
6.	"AS Too Wrong"	4:14
7.	"AS Spectacult" (featuring Oracle)	2:59
8.	"AS Faceless"	2:31
9.	"AS Chain"	2:17
10.	"AS Securitaz"	4:16
11.	"AS Chaos" (featuring Pan Daijing)	3:49
12.	"AS Rewild"	2:41
