= Tenía Razón =

Single by Daniela Lalita

from the album Trececerotres
- Language: Spanish
- Released: July 12, 2022
- Studio: Sterling Sound, Edgewater, NJ
- Genre: Folktronica; avant-pop; experimental electronic
- Length: 2:53
- Label: Young
- Songwriters: Daniela Lalita; Sega Bodega
- Producers: Daniela Lalita; Sega Bodega

Daniela Lalita singles chronology
"Tenía Razón" (2022)	"No Para" (2022)

Music video
- "Tenía Razón" on YouTube

"Tenía Razón" (English: "I Was Right") is a song by Peruvian musician Daniela Lalita. It was released on July 12, 2022 through Young as the lead single from her debut EP Trececerotres (2022). Written and produced by Lalita in collaboration with Sega Bodega, the song incorporates elements of folktronica, avant-pop, and experimental electronic music. It was later included on the soundtrack of the video game EA Sports FIFA 23.

== Recording and composition ==
"Tenía Razón" was recorded at Sterling Sound. Lalita performed vocals and played a Buchla modular synthesizer, in addition to co-writing and co-producing the track. Sega Bodega contributed additional programming and co-production. Vocal engineering was handled by Lalita, while mixing was completed by Gabriel Schuman. Mastering was carried out by Joe LaPorta at Sterling Sound.

The song is set in common time with a tempo of 103 beats per minute. It is composed in the key of E minor and follows a chord progression of Em–B–C–Cm. Lalita has cited melodies sung by her mother and grandmother during her childhood in Lima as an influence on the track.

== Lyrics ==
A form of self-exploration of the relationships we have with our past and future selves, with the intention of trying to love and understand ourselves in all our variations, no matter how many times those manifest as constant, antagonistic...and almost monstrous voices trying to destroy one's sense of self. Many of these internal battles and emotions are almost impossible to explain so I hope to connect with others who are experiencing similar emotions.

— Daniela Lalita, Marvin

According to Lalita, the song explores the relationship between past and future selves, emphasizing self-acceptance despite internal conflict. She said it addresses antagonistic inner voices and emotions that are difficult to articulate, aiming to resonate with listeners who share similar experiences.

== Release and reception ==
"Tenía Razón" was released on July 12, 2022 via Young and later featured on the FIFA 23 soundtrack. Critical reception highlighted Lalita's vocal performance and the track's experimental production. Reviewers noted the contrast between her initially subdued vocal delivery and its later transformation into layered textures over a rhythm influenced by Arca. Some critics compared her vocal style to that of Kate Bush, while others described it as resembling "primal chanting". Several commentators observed that the song generated intrigue regarding Lalita's artistic identity and sonic aesthetic. The Journal of Musical Things named "Tenía Razón" one of the five best songs of 2022.

== Music video ==
The music video for "Tenía Razón" was released alongside the single and directed by Lalita. Choreographed in collaboration with Isabel Legate, it features her mother, Pilar Secada, and explores themes of inner dialogue, mental health, and trauma. The visual concept draws on psychoanalytic interpretations of dreams as expressions of the subconscious. Critics have compared the choreography and trance-like movement to the work of Pina Bausch. The Peruvian online magazine Rock Achorao named it the best music video in Peru in 2022.

== Credits and personnel ==
- Daniela Lalita – lead vocals, synthesizer, programming
- Sega Bodega – programming
- Joe LaPorta – mastering engineer
- Gabriel Schuman – mixing engineer
- Daniela Lalita – engineer
