= Aurora (Daniela Lalita song) =

Single by Daniela Lalita
- Language: Spanish
- Released: September 18, 2026
- Genre: Latin; electronic; world
- Length: 2:44
- Label: The Orchard\Inferno
- Songwriter: Daniela Lalita
- Producer: Daniela Lalita

Daniela Lalita singles chronology
"Tac Tac" (2026)	"Aurora" (2026)

Music video
- "Aurora" on YouTube

"Aurora" is a song by Peruvian musician Daniela Lalita, released on September 18, 2026. It was written and produced by Lalita and features the Chilean-Swedish musician Dinamarca as a second lead vocalist.

== Production and composition ==
"Aurora" was written and produced by Lalita and features the Madrid-based, Chilean-Swedish musician Dinamarca as a second lead vocalist. Kayla Reagan mixed the track, and mastering was completed by Alec Ness. Musically, the song combines Latin, electronic, and world music influences. It is composed in D minor, set in common time, and has a tempo of 127 beats per minute. For the single cover, which shows Lalita inside a submarine, she used a still from the music video for "Tiroteo".

== Release and reception ==
"Aurora" was released on September 18, 2026. Bant Mag. noted that "Aurora" was less aggressive than her debut EP Trececerotres and described its sound as "angelic" and "spiritual". FBi Radio pointed out that, like Lalita's other two new singles, "Aurora" is characterized by rhythmic patterns that complement her playful vocals perfectly.

== Credits and personnel ==
Credits were adapted from Tidal.

- Daniela Lalita – lead vocals, songwriter, producer
- Dinamarca – lead vocals
- Kayla Reagan – mixing engineer
- Alec Ness – mastering engineer
