= Puppets and Puppets =

American fashion label

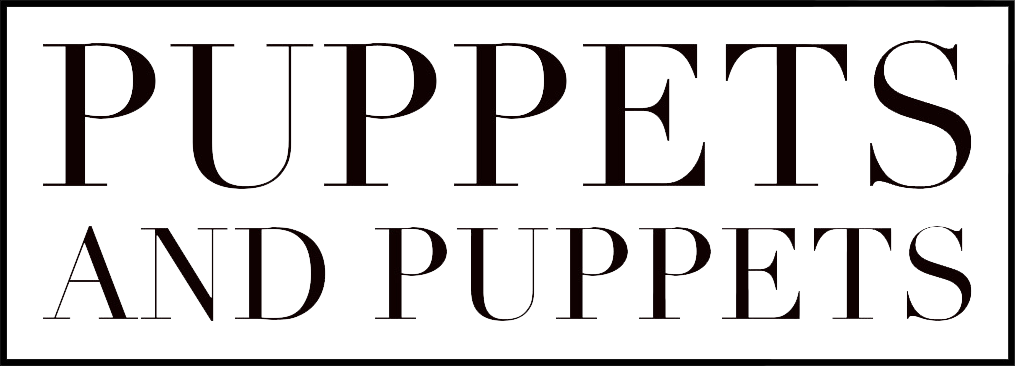
- Type: Private company
- Industry: Fashion
- Founded: 2018; 8 years ago
- Founder: Carly Mark and Ayla Argentina
- Headquarters: New York City, United States of America
- Products: Apparel, accessories,
- Website: www.puppetsandpuppets.com

Puppets and Puppets is a New York based fashion label found in 2018 by Carly Mark and Ayla Argentina, but is now run solely by Mark. In 2023, Mark was nominated for the Fashion Trust US St. John Knits award for ready-to-wear. In 2024, Mark announced her plans to relocate to London, downsize her team, and exit ready-to-wear focusing solely on accessories.

== Work ==
Puppets and Puppets began as a shared creative endeavor between Carly Mark and Ayla Argentina. Argentina did much of the sewing while Mark was the creative director and publicist. For British Vogue Mark explained that the creative division of labor as, "My main focus is the show itself and I oversee the art direction and decide the theme of the collection. It’s 50/50 creative input, but Ayla has garment construction ideas and fashion history knowledge that I wouldn’t think of." By 2023 it was noted in the Washington Post and Business of Fashion that Argentina had left the label.

=== Name ===
Puppets and Puppets' name derives from Mark's dog, a chihuahua mix named "Puppet." Both humorous and purposeful, Mark ironizes the weight of the word "puppet" in the fashion industry with the way models are treated and how trend followers act.

== Collections ==
Puppets and Puppets fluctuates between streetwear and "theatrical and humorous creations" The label has been noted for its dramatic silhouettes, Grunge aesthetics, use of recycled and reclaimed items, food themed details, and absurdist one-of-a-kind pieces. For instance, one notable accessory is the Cookie Leather Top Handle Bag. The bag is a simple leather bag with a hyperrealistic chocolate chip cookie adorned on its center.

The fashion critic Rachel Tashjian has noted the brand's ability to encapsulate the chic yet comfortable sophisticated women living in New York: "I saw a staffer at the Puppets and Puppets show who was dressed exactly as I see a lot of cool, sophisticated women dressing now. She looked thirty-something, and had on a very preppy slightly undersized Puppets crewneck sweater with a pair of satin leopard-print boardshorts trimmed with black lace, and very tasteful, Princess Diana-worthy almond-toe ballet flats. Very pulled together in this offbeat way, and a bit boyish."

=== Harelquin ===
Puppets and Puppets first collection was an anti-fast fashion showing of "wearable art pieces [which] mix a ’90s DIY aesthetic with over-the-top harlequinesque costume." The collection featured approximately 35% salvaged materials, either from eBay, the Salvation Army, or from Marks previous sculpture and video work.

=== American Psycho Meets the Romanoffs ===
Inspired by Fabergé Eggs, the Romanoffs, and American Psycho, Puppets and puppets presented their collection at Prince George Ballroom. Vogue commented on the recurring image of eggs throughout the collection by saying it, "...was like stepping into a Salvador Dalí painting filled with shoes fashioned from egg cartons and little bralette nipple coverings made to look like sunny side-up yolks." The shoes fashioned out of egg crates evoked the saying "walking on eggshells."

=== Moebius ===
Puppets and Puppets' fall 2020 collection was based on the sci-fi drawing of Jean Giraud, also known as Moebius, specifically his storyboards of the failed adaptation of Dune. Embellished with cookies and popcorn, the clothing was less commercial than their last two collections, but was more focused on story, with each model picking their character and Puppets and Puppets specifically designing a costume for them. Although none of the looks from these early collections were put into production, the trompe l'oeil chocolate chip cookie handbag from this season was a commercial success for the line. It has become a signature item for Puppets and Puppets. New colorways and limited-edition variations are released regularly.
