= The Kulenovic Collection =

The Kulenovic Collection was an art and decorative arts museum and private collection that opened in 2007 in Karlskrona, Sweden. The Collection has been in the spotlight for 80 years. The curator of The Kulenovic Collection is Rizha Kulenovic.

== Collections ==
The Kulenovic Collection includes works of art, Chinese ceramics, arts and crafts, and archaeological findings that during 600 years have been collector´s items for the influential Kulenovic-family. The family had their sphere of activity in the Balkans, Venice, Constantinople/Istanbul and Persia. Representatives of the Kulenovic family were since 1447, in eight generations forward, pashas at the sultanate in the Ottoman Empire and a parallel branch of the family were international businessmen and civil servants at the Doge in Venice.

== Collections history ==
The western art in the Collection covers a period from the Renaissance to around 1920. The Eastern objects originate from the Ottoman Empire, the countries around and the regions along the Silk Road from Istanbul to Peking.
