= Carly Mark =

American artist and writer

- Born: 1988; Detroit, Michigan, United States
- Education: School of Visual Arts
- Known for: sculpture, painting, video

Carly Mark (born 1988) is an American contemporary artist and writer working in a variety of media including sculpture, painting, and video. She is known for creating works that relate to commercial food packaging, specifically Haribo gummy bears. Currently, she is best known for her fashion label Puppets and Puppets.

== Life and career ==
Carly mark was born in Detroit, Michigan in 1988 and attended the Eliel Saarinen designed Cranbrook Kingswood High School. After growing up in the Midwest Mark moved to New York City at 18 to attend the School of Visual Arts. In 2014 she began creating artwork as a full-time endeavor.

Mark was formerly in a relationship with artist Jordan Wolfson.

In 2018 Mark founded the fashion label Puppets and Puppets with Ayla Argentina. By 2023 it was noted in the Washington Post and Business of Fashion that Argentina had left the label leaving it to be run solely by Mark.

== Work ==
Still from the 2016 video art piece, Good Buy Human.

Carly Mark's work centers on commercial food packaging, specifically the wrappers for Haribo gummy bears. She works in multiple media including sculpture, painting, and video. When Mark began painting individual bags of snack foods, she started by using materials she had readily available, notably tracing paper and watercolor. Zach Sokol of Vice describes her Haribo bag paintings as," revisionist advertisements" and "...gorgeous acrylic freakouts that mix and mash personal reference points with the flamboyant wrapping, such as Gold Bear bags featuring characters from films like Alien or Brazil and nods to art history like the postmodern architecture collective Memphis Group."

In 2015, Carly Mark edited an issue of, and conducted an interview with Lisa Frank for, Foundations magazine.

Mark's 2016 video Good Buy Human features Eric Wareheim from the double act Tim & Eric as an anthropomorphic gummy bear inserting a butt plug. The solo show which featured this video also exhibited a selection of her paintings, wallpaper she designed, as well as blown glass sculptures.

== Exhibitions ==
Carly Mark exhibited in many group shows between 2013 and 2016 including the Red Bull Music Academy, the Brooklyn Academy of Music and the Shanghai Biennale in 2013, The Frieze Art Fair in 2014, The Museum of Modern Art and Montreal's Division Gallery in 2015, and Frieze New York and The Armory Show in 2016.

Her first major solo show was in 2016 at The Breeder Gallery in Athens, Greece.
