= Glamcult =

Dutch magazine

Glamcult is an Amsterdam-based magazine that focuses on fashion, music, and art. Glamcult markets itself as an unbiased and socially progressive magazine, with international focus.

== History and profile ==
Glamcult was originally founded in 2003 by Rogier Vlaming and Wiebe de Ridder as an Independent Style Paper. Vlaming, the Editor-in-Chief, is now the sole publisher. In its first year as a newspaper, Glamcult was distributed by bike in the four biggest cities in the Netherlands. In 2008, Glamcult Independent Style Paper and Supernova Graphic Design, came together and formed Glamcult Studio & Glamcult Magazine.

From 2015, the newspaper developed into a bi-annual magazine and has featured creatives including Lizzo, FKA Twigs, SOPHIE, Cardi B, and Tommy Ca$h.

== Glamcult Studio ==
Glamcult Studio is Glamcult's sister company; a graphic design studio, owned and ran by Marline Bakker.
