= Tierra Sur =

Peruvian reggae band

Tierra Sur is a Peruvian reggae band founded in 1988 by musician Pochi Marambio.

The band has close ties to Lima's music scene and organized the city's first reggae festival there. It is regarded as one of the pioneers of reggae in Peru and helped popularize the genre nationally.

Their 1992 album Mi marimba included the hit song "Llaman a la puerta", which received significant airplay in Peru.
