= Trececerotres =

EP by Daniela Lalita
- Released: September 16, 2022
- Studios: Sterling Sound, Edgewater, NJ
- Genres: Folktronica; art pop; experimental electronic; avant-pop; electroacoustic; dark pop, industrial; experimental folk
- Length: 14:22
- Label: Young
- Producer: Daniela Lalita

Daniela Lalita chronology
Trececerotres (2022)	TAC TAC (2026)

Singles from Trececerotres
- 1. "Tenía Razón" Released: July 12, 2022; 2. "No Para" Released: August 24, 2022

Trececerotres is the debut extended play (EP) by Peruvian musician Daniela Lalita. The Spanish title refers to apartment number 1303 in Lima, where she lived with her mother and grandmother before relocating to New York.

The EP was released on September 16, 2022, through the independent British label Young, part of the Beggars Group. It was mastered by Joe LaPorta at Sterling Sound. The EP entered the UK Physical Singles Top 100 and was preceded by the singles "No Para" and "Tenía Razón"; the latter was part of the EA Sports FIFA 23 soundtrack. It received positive critical reception and appeared on several year-end best-of lists.

== Concept ==
According to Nuebo, Trececerotres draws on themes of "magic, ritual, healing, and the matrilineal relationship", reflecting Lalita's personal experiences growing up. The process of creating this work took five years, during which time she drew much of her inspiration for the composition from the teachings she had received from her mother and grandmother.

== Singles ==
The first single from the EP, "Tenía Razón", was co-produced by Sega Bodega and released on July 12, 2022. Lalita has described it as an exploration of the relationship between one's past and future selves, focusing on self-acceptance amid internal conflict. She has characterized the song as an attempt to articulate internal emotional struggles that are difficult to express verbally, with the intention of resonating with listeners experiencing similar feelings. Mexican magazine Marvin interpreted the song as addressing themes of self-trust and personal conviction in the face of external doubt.

No Para was released as the second single on August 24, 2022. It appears as the fourth track on the EP and combines expressive vocals with electronic instrumentation using a Buchla synthesizer.

== Music videos ==
A music video was released for each track on the EP:

The video for "Trececerotres", released on February 2, 2023, and directed by Lalita, depicts the artist seated and responding subtly to the song's dark ambient soundscape. In her own words:

"I've learned to develop my own paths, like offerings to a deity. I need to feed it and tame it. It's not horror and it's not evil, it's not about that. It's just what happens. So I make my own rituals. It's better when I create things and when I'm proud. It's better when you're watching me." (Note: Lalita, Daniela (February 2, 2023). Daniela Lalita - Trececerotres (Official Music Video). YouTube.)

Also the video for "Tenía Razón", released on the same date as the single, was directed by Lalita. The choreography by her and Isabel Legate involves her mother Pilar Secada. According to Lalita, it symbolizes her inner thoughts and draws inspiration from recurring dreams. "In psychoanalysis, dreams are the key to your subconscious"; "it's mainly about mental health and inner battles, dealing with trauma" she said. (Note: Lalita, Daniela (July 22, 2022). Daniela Lalita - Tenía Razón (Official Music Video). YouTube.)

"Atrás", directed by Nate Boyce and Paul Gondry (son of Michel Gondry) with additional cinematography by Sofia Sinibaldi and 3D modeling by Hilsth, was released on October 10, 2022. The video presents the song's themes of betrayal through "a fantastical and frightening world".

"No Para", directed by Bradley & Pablo with "Lalita dressed in her own hand-sewn garments, re-enacting a ritual she performed months prior in the same area" was filmed at a volcanic site near Arequipa, Peru, approximately 16,000 feet above sea level. Lalita has described the location as significant to her grandmother's worldview.

The video for the last song "Pisoteo", released on the same date as the EP, was directed by Lalita and choreographed by Lourdes Leon, showing her dancing in an abandoned, empty building. (Note: Lalita, Daniela (September 16, 2022). Daniela Lalita - Pisoteo (Official Music Video). YouTube.) It opens with the voice of Lalita's grandmother urging her to put her soul into everything she does, followed by Lalita's expressive dance alone in an empty room that channels this message, turning grief into a powerful act of artistic expression.

== Critical reception ==
The EP received positive reviews from Pitchfork, Dazed, and Gaffa. In an article about overlooked releases that deserve more attention, Isabelia Herrera of Pitchfork highlights Daniela Lalita's mastery of her voice, which extends in a "thousand different directions". Martyn Pepperell of Dazed noted that Lalita's expressiveness extends beyond her music to her visual presentation, including costume design and choreography. According to Javier Rodríguez-Camacho, music critic at Opinión, Daniela Lalita works on the border between electronics and conceptualism. The EP has been compared to "ancestral rituals" and "psychotropic journeys", and Numéro described it as magical and melancholic, calling it "as bewitching as it is frightening." With a view on Lalita "caring for her grandmother, who battled and ultimately survived cancer in early 2019", Isabelia Herrera wrote about the song "Pisoteo": "Her sepulchral performance makes her sound as if she were summoning her ancestors via gothic hymn." According to Our Culture Mag, this "intricate collection of experimental tracks" is characterized by a unique production style that combines traditional and modern elements.

== Track listing ==
Trececerotres track listing
No.	Title	Writer(s)	Producer(s)	Length
1.	"Trececerotres"	Daniela Lalita	Lalita	2:15
2.	"Tenía Razón"	Lalita; Sega Bodega	Lalita; Bodega	2:53
3.	"Atrás"	Lalita; Dasychira	Lalita; Ville Haimala	3:05
4.	"No Para"	Lalita; Miguel Ballumbrosio	Lalita	3:31
5.	"Pisoteo"	Lalita	Lalita	2:35
Total length:				14:22

== Personnel ==
Musicians

- Daniela Lalita – lead vocals (1–5), synthesizer (1–5), programming (1–5)
- Sega Bodega – programming (2)
- Alex Epton – additional programming (4)
- Gabriel Schuman – additional programming (5)
- Ville Haimala – additional programming (5)
- Miguel Ballumbrosio – cajón (4)

Technical

- Joe LaPorta – mastering engineer (1–5)
- Gabriel Schuman – mixing engineer (1–5)
- Daniela Lalita – engineer (1–5)
- Chris Z. Wang – recording engineer (1)
- Ville Haimala – engineer (3)
- Alex Epton – engineer (4)

Artwork and design

- Collin Fletcher – design, layout
- Myles Henrik Hall – photography
- Haley Menchel – art production
- Caroline Waxse – art production
- Mila Taylor-Young – production design
