= Tearless =

Studio album by Amnesia Scanner
- Released: June 19, 2020
- Genre: Deconstructed club; art pop; industrial rock; avant-garde reggaeton; post-dubstep; experimental
- Length: 30:24
- Label: PAN
- Producer: Amnesia Scanner

Amnesia Scanner chronology
Another Life (2018)	Tearless (2020)

Singles from Tearless
- 1. "AS Acá" Released: November 19, 2019; 2. "AS Going" Released: April 14, 2020; 3. "AS Tearless" Released: May 12, 2020

Tearless is the second studio album by Finnish electronic music duo Amnesia Scanner. It was released on June 19, 2020 by PAN.

== Critical reception ==
Professional ratings
Aggregate scores
Source	Rating
Metacritic	70/100
Review scores
Source	Rating
Exclaim!	5/10
Pitchfork	7.2/10
Uncut	5/10
Musikexpress	5/6

Chal Ravens of Pitchfork reviewed "Their music grapples with life in the Anthropocene, drawing from nu-metal and hardcore in songs that feel burned out and overwhelmed." The German magazine Musikexpress concludes: 'The world is coming to an end, and Amnesia Scanner once again summarise the present in an eclectically overdriven avant-electro-pop design.'

== Track listing ==
All tracks written by Amnesia Scanner.

No.	Title	Length
1.	"AS Enter"	2:35
2.	"AS Tearless" (featuring Lalita)	4:09
3.	"AS Flat" (featuring Code Orange)	3:13
4.	"AS Trouble"	2:35
5.	"AS Acá (transl. "Here")" (featuring Lalita)	3:18
6.	"Call Of The Center (Interlude)"	0:16
7.	"AS Too Late"	3:27
8.	"AS Going" (featuring Lyzza)	3:19
9.	"AS Labyrinth"	3:31
10.	"AS U Will Be Fine"	4:01
