= George Rouy =

British visual artist

- Born: 1994 (age 31–32); Sittingbourne, Kent, Great Britain
- Education: Camberwell College of Arts
- Occupations: Visual artist; contemporary artist

George Rouy (born 1994) is a British contemporary artist and painter. He is known for figurative paintings that depict distorted and often anonymous human figures, exploring the body, emotion, identity and transformation. His practice also encompasses music, performance and scenography.

== Early life and education ==
Rouy was born in Sittingbourne, Kent, in 1994. He left school at the age of 16 and later studied painting at Camberwell College of Arts in London, graduating in 2015.

As a child, Rouy spent much of his free time drawing and painting. At Camberwell, he initially encountered figurative painting at a time when it was considered unfashionable, but continued to develop his interest in the human figure. He has cited artists including Jenny Saville, Chris Ofili, Cecily Brown, Francis Bacon and Lucian Freud among his influences.

== Career ==
Rouy began exhibiting his paintings in London and New York in the late 2010s. In 2018, he was described by GQ as a young painter from Kent who had already held four solo exhibitions in London and New York. His work has been associated with a revival of figurative painting and is characterised by hazy, sensual and increasingly distorted depictions of the human form.

In 2024, Rouy entered into a joint representation agreement with Hauser & Wirth and Hannah Barry Gallery. The Art Newspaper reported that the arrangement made Rouy one of four artists under the age of 45 to be taken on by Hauser & Wirth through its joint-representation initiatives. His first exhibition with Hauser & Wirth, The Bleed, Part I, opened in London in October 2024. The Bleed, Part II opened at Hauser & Wirth in Los Angeles in February 2025. The exhibition continued Rouy's exploration of the human figure, with works positioned between figuration and abstraction.

Rouy has also worked across painting, music, fashion and performance. In February 2025, he collaborated with choreographer Sharon Eyal on BODYSUIT, a performance presented at Hauser & Wirth in Los Angeles. Rouy provided the music and scenography, while Eyal created the choreography.

== Artistic practice ==
Rouy's paintings focus predominantly on the human body. His figures are frequently faceless, fragmented or merged with one another, creating ambiguous forms that move between representation and abstraction. Rather than consistently working from live models, he has described using images found online as starting points and manipulating photographic references digitally before translating them into paintings.

His approach has been compared with that of earlier figurative painters, particularly Francis Bacon, although Rouy has emphasised the influence of photography, contemporary imagery and the work of artists such as Jenny Saville and Cecily Brown.

Rouy has also worked as a fashion model, walking in shows for fashion houses including Miu Miu and Saint Laurent.

== Exhibitions ==
Rouy's work has been exhibited internationally in galleries and museums, including presentations in London, New York, Paris, Los Angeles and elsewhere. His exhibitions include The Bleed, Part I at Hauser & Wirth in London in 2024 and The Bleed, Part II in Los Angeles in 2025. In 2026, Rouy was preparing his debut exhibition at Hauser & Wirth in New York. The exhibition was described by New York Magazine's Curbed as a significant step in his rapidly developing career.

== Reception ==
Reviewing Rouy's 2018 exhibition Smothered Awake at Steve Turner in Los Angeles, Sharon Mizota of the Los Angeles Times compared his figures with the fleshy forms of Fernando Botero and the sculptural forms of Henry Moore, while noting similarities to the distorted anatomy of Jean-Auguste-Dominique Ingres's La Grande Odalisque. She also interpreted the paintings as reworking subjects from Western art history in ways that explore ambivalence about sex and intimacy.

In 2022, Sleek described Rouy's practice as combining abstraction and representation. The magazine characterized his treatment of the human figure as an exploration of the experience of inhabiting and sharing space with a body, and noted his increasing use of distortion and abstraction in group scenes.

Writing about Rouy's 2023 exhibition BODY SUIT, The Art Newspaper noted that his paintings focused on the relationship between psychological landscapes and the physical body, with increasingly blurred and fluid applications of paint that resisted a single fixed interpretation.

In 2024, Wallpaper noted that Rouy's distorted figures had frequently been compared with the work of Francis Bacon and described his practice as having developed towards a more abstract treatment of the human form.

== Publications ==
=== Monographs ===
- Mills, Charlie. George Rouy: Selected Works 2017–2023. Herne Bay: Tarmac Press, 2023. ISBN 978-1-7396350-0-8.

=== Exhibition catalogues ===
- Linhares, Judith; Christensen, Rasmus Thor. New "Bad" Painting. Hadsten: Tryk D, 2018."George Rouy". Almine Rech.
- Elg, Jesper. Cut Down a Tree to Build a Wooden Horse, to Ride You May Get Splinters. Copenhagen: V1 Gallery, 2019."George Rouy". Almine Rech.
- Kuitca, Guillermo, ed. Les Citoyens: Uno sguardo di Guillermo Kuitca sulla collezione della Fondation Cartier pour l'art contemporain. Paris: Fondation Cartier pour l'art contemporain, 2021."George Rouy". Almine Rech.
- Troncy, Éric, ed. The Echo of Picasso. Málaga: Fundación Museo Picasso Málaga, 2023."George Rouy". Hauser & Wirth.
