= Rochelle Goldberg =

Canadian contemporary artist

Rochelle Goldberg (born 1984 in Vancouver, Canada) is a contemporary artist who lives and works in Vancouver and Berlin. Goldberg is best known for her sculptural works that challenge the fixity of the art object. Composed of living, ephemeral, and synthetic materials, ranging from chia seeds, oil, to ceramic, Goldberg's works are structured by "the logic of intraction," the artist's phrase for "an unruly set of relations in which the boundary between one entity is another is continually undermined." In her practice, intraction unfolds on both levels of form and content, rendering her sculptures "ontologically unreliable" and questioning "the distinction between living form and inert matter" through contact and permeation. At the same time, vision as "the privileged mode of access to knowledge" is cast into crisis.

== Education ==
Goldberg received her B.A. from McGill University in 2006, followed by a M.F.A. from Bard College in 2014. She has been the recipient of numerous grants and awards, including the Louis Comfort Tiffany Award (2015); Atelier Calder Artist-in Residence (2017); Battaglia Foundry Sculpture Prize (2018); Canada Council for the Arts Grant (2018); and Chinati Foundation Residency (2018).

== Works ==
Goldberg's work interrogates and blurs "the material and conceptual distinctions" between natural systems and the built environment. Taking into account living and nonliving micro and macro-actants, her practice often emphasizes transformations; mutations; and suspensions. Recurring themes in her work include predation, seeds, oil, the Anthropocene, and Mary of Egypt. Goldberg has stated: "I am interested in where interior and exterior collapse--the boundary is always leaking...I think of it as synaptic. That one thing touches the other the other touches the other. That dizzying space of recuperation becomes a labyrinth."

=== Major works ===
In 2015, Goldberg presented The Cannibal Actif at Federico Vavasoori in Milan, Italy. The installation consisted of a miniature forest of chia sprouts colonizing three areas of grey carpet, as well as a series of dark glazed ceramic sculptures under spotlights. The sculptures were shaped like coil serpents, with uneven patterns of scale marks on the surface. Furthermore, the floor and the columns were divided by slime trails of live snails covered in glitter. The accompanying text, “Notes on the Cannibal Actif,” described the marks as “like turtles that will soon collapse under the weight of their jewel-encrusted shells,” in a reference to Joris-Karl Huysmans's novel À rebours (Against Nature, 1883). In the basement was "Hungry Hungry #1, #2, #3, #4, #5" (2015), a set of sculptures in the shape of crocodile heads with open jaws alluding to Lucio Fontana’s glazed ceramic "Coccodrillo (Crocodile)" (1936–7). In ArtReview, Barbara Casavecchia characterized the installation as staged allegories of “enhanced rhythms of growth, decay, and forced revitalization” under the current cycle of consumption and the Anthropocene.

The following year, Goldberg staged a solo exhibition, The Plastic Thirsty, at SculptureCenter in New York. With plastic thirsty “as a condition [that] articulates the simultaneous occurrence of fluidity and dehydration in the industrial lubricant,” the show sought to question “modes of connectivity that equally transmit a loss of contact or a rupturing of terms.” Among the works in the site-specific installation were "For every living carcass I and II" (2016), a human-sized pair of desiccated fish skeletons; "Try Again, I, II, III, IV, V" (2016), a series of Magic 8 Balls; and "Iron Oracle" (2016), a contour-line sculpture of a steam engine coated to hip-height with chia seeds. In the accompanying catalogue, Ruba Katrib has noted that the sculptures emphasize the material interconnection between things and humans, not only acknowledging "the interrelationship of material conditions with states of mind,” but also hinting “at the psychic cost of their damage.” Later in 2016, Goldberg also participated in Mirror Cells, a five-artist sculpture exhibition, at the Whitney Museum of American Art. In the exhibition, Goldberg presented "No Where, Now Here" (2016), in which the artist evoked “environmental disaster” through oil-glazed pelicans on a bed of sprouting chia seeds.

In 2017, Goldberg held Intralocuters, her first solo exhibition at Miguel Abreu Gallery. The exhibition featured numerous glazed-ceramic heads, busts, and nearly life-sized figures, which represented the three Marys of the New Testament: Virgin Mary, Mary Magdalene, and Mary of Egypt. Loosely modeled on Donatello’s “Penitent Magdalene,” which juxtaposes a feminine face with masculine shoulders and feet, Goldberg's busts rested on palettes of tile in carved and painted fiberboard. Consisting of unexpected combinations of materials, including brass, fiber optics, vinyl and cast iron, the sculptures transformed the narrative of the Marys and examined the relationship between bodily decay, survival, and the tactile world. CURA reviewed that the exhibition's "theatrical quality" heightened “the generative collisions of time, matters, and material.”

Based on the Pétroleuses, a group of female supporters of the Paris Commune who allegedly threw bottles of lit petroleum in defiance, Goldberg presented Pétroleuse in 2018 at Éclair, Berlin. Situated in the former West Berlin bar frequented by male sex workers, the installation constituted of a bronze mask was staked at waist height over carpets; scattered LED strands; lit “matchsticks”; light switch plates; and loose celery roots. One of the works, “Digesting Gold” (2018), staged a series of glass bowls in a thin sheet of plastic film collecting water, gold dust, and atmospheric sediment. Oil in Pétroleuse has been described as an agent "capable of dissolving the singular into the collective," as well as one that stages “a metaphorically inflammatory environment without any clear organization (good/evil) other than imminent ignition, thus prefiguring radical release.”

In 2020, Goldberg staged Psychomachia, her second exhibition at Miguel Abreu Gallery. Included in the show were "Picnic" (2020), a baked bread dough laced with metal coins onto glass bowls; and “Soiled [Resurrected]” (2017–20), a work inspired by the story of Mary of Egypt. For the latter work, Goldberg deployed a rectangular foam floor piece from her previous exhibition Intralocutors. However, the chia seeds were replaced with organic and inorganic substances, such as dirt, sourdough, and aluminum facsimiles, which served as metaphors to the narrative and mutated throughout the exhibition. Artforum has stated that in the exhibition, Goldberg “combined art’s recent ecological turn with the ‘allegorical impulse’ that the critic Craig Owens ascribed to postmodernism in the 1980s.” Along this line, vanitas has also been observed as a second allegorical motif within the show.

== Exhibitions (selected) ==
Solo exhibitions of Goldberg's work have been staged at Miguel Abreu Gallery (New York, 2020 and 2017); The Power Station (Dallas, 2019); Casa Masaccio (San Giovanni Valderno, Italy, 2018); GAMeC (Bergamo, Italy, 2017); and SculptureCenter (New York, 2016). In 2018, she also mounted "Pétroleuse" with curator Milan Ther at Éclair, Berlin.

Goldberg has also participated in group exhibitions, including "Mirror Cells" (2016), curated by Christopher Lew and Jane Panetta at the Whitney Museum of American Art; and the Okayama Art Summit (2016), a biennial exhibition organized by Liam Gillick in Okayama, Japan. Cannibal Actif, her first monograph designed with Geoff Kaplan, was co-published by Totem and Sequence Press in 2017.
