= Amnesia Scanner =

Finnish electronic music duo

- Origin: Berlin, Germany
- Genres: Deconstructed club; electronic; experimental
- Labels: PAN; Gum Artefacts; YOUNG
- Members: Ville Haimala; Martti Kalliala
- Website: amnesiascanner.net

Amnesia Scanner is a Berlin-based electronic music duo created by Finnish-born Ville Haimala and Martti Kalliala, currently signed to the German experimental electronic music label PAN.

== Career ==
Following the release of a live album in 2014, they released their debut physical EP AS as a vinyl exclusive in 2016. They have also collaborated with Holly Herndon and Mykki Blanco. The duo had a previous project called Renaissance Man.

The duo's debut album, Another Life, was released in 2018. Another studio album, Tearless, was released in 2020.

== Discography ==
=== Studio albums ===
- Another Life (2018)
- Tearless (2020)
- Strobe.rip (2023) (with Freeka Tet)
- HOAX (2024) (with Freeka Tet)

=== EPs ===
- Angels Rig Hook (2015)
- AS (2016)

=== Mixtapes ===
- Cyber Monday (2015)
- LEXACHAST (2016) (with Bill Kouligas, reworked and released as an album in 2019)
- AS Truth (2017)

=== Live albums ===
- AS Live [][][][][] (2014)
