= Martine Fougeron =

French-American photographer

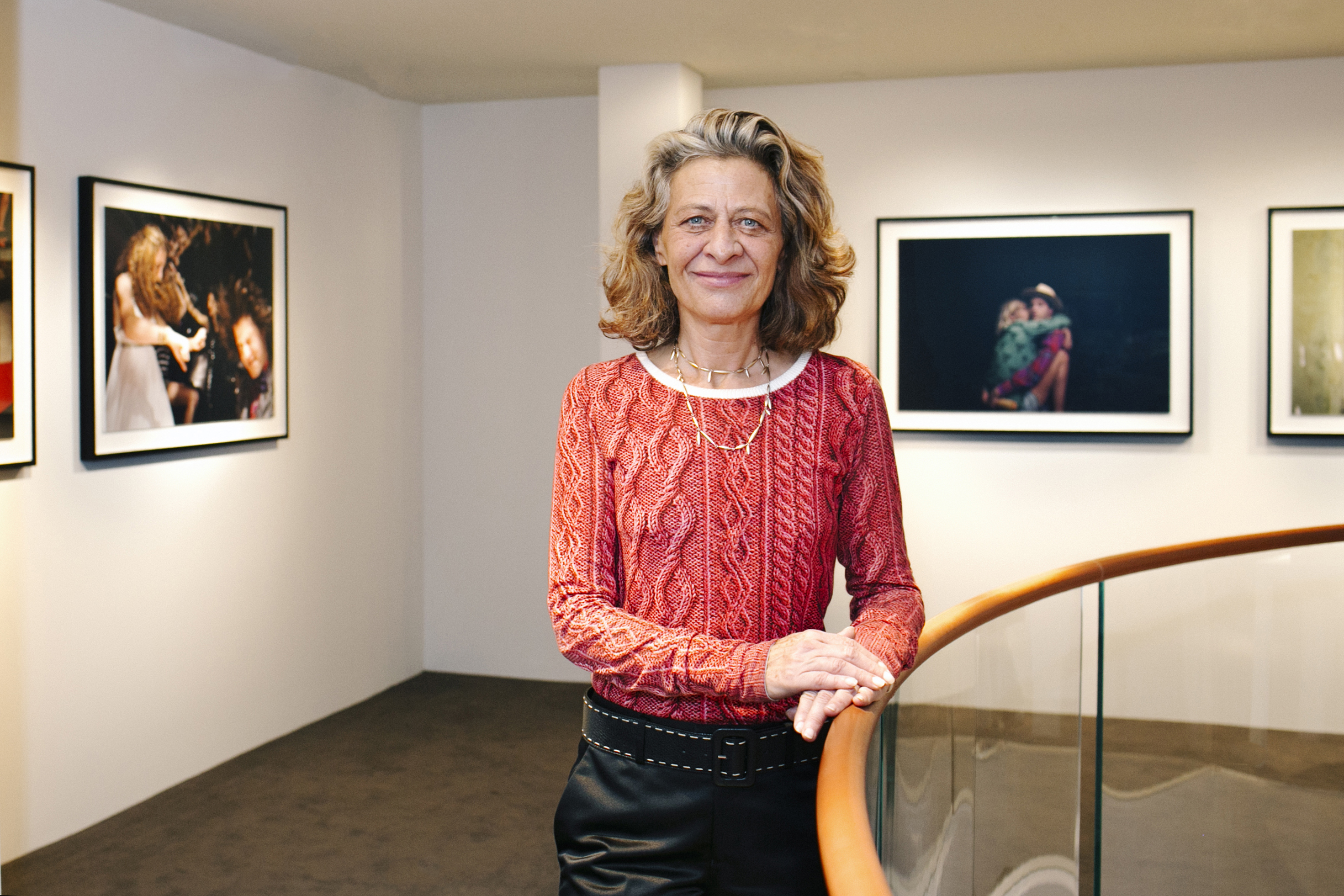
- Born: 1954, Paris, France
- Education: International Center of Photography
- Known for: Photography
- Website: www.martinefougeron.com

Martine Fougeron is a French-American photographer and filmmaker based in Paris and New York City. Her work has been exhibited and published extensively, and collected by numerous major museums including the Museum of Fine Arts, Houston, Philadelphia Museum of Art, and the Bronx Museum of the Arts. Fougeron has published one monograph to date: Nicolas et Adrien – A World with Two Sons, published by Steidl in 2019.

== Life and career ==
Martine Fougeron was born in Paris, France in 1954. She relocated to the United States as a child with her family, but spent her high school years in a boarding school near Paris, thereafter transitioning back and forth between France and the United States. As a teenager, she attended the Lycée Français de New York and the French boarding school l'Institut Saint Dominique. She graduated from Wellesley College in 1975, Sciences Po in 1979, and the International Center of Photography in 2006.

Fougeron relocated for work to New York in 1996. While pursuing a career as a creative director in the fragrance industry, she took up photography in 2002 in part to spend more time with her children. She embarked upon a multi-year project of photographing her sons and their friends in their formative years. The resultant series was displayed at the Gallery at Hermès in 2013 before its release in 2014 as the collection Teen Tribe. In 2016, a selection of the series was featured in the collection Family Photography Now, along with eight other photographers. The photographs have been widely exhibited and are the subject of the Nicolas et Adrien monograph published by Steidl in 2019.

In 2011, Fougeron began working on a series of images documenting life in the South Bronx. Titled The South Bronx Trades, the series was exhibited at The Bronx Museum of the Arts in 2014.

Fougeron's work is included in collections at the Museum of Fine Arts, Houston, Philadelphia Museum of Art, and the Getty Research Institute in Los Angeles.

Fougeron is on the Faculty of the International Center of Photography and has been a visiting lecturer at The Camera Club of New York and the School of Visual Arts, as well as an artist-in-residence at the Chennai Photo Biennale and the Lycee Français de New York. She is the founder of The Photography Master Retreat, an annual summer workshop in the south of France. In 2016, she was a resident artist at Yaddo, an artist community located in Saratoga Springs, New York. In 2009, she was included among Photo District News's list of 30 photographers to watch.

Fougeron is a frequent contributor to The New Yorker, The New York Times Magazine, FT Magazine WSJ and New York Magazine.

== Work ==
=== Nicolas et Adrien – A World with Two Sons ===
Fougeron's primary fine art photography project since 2005 has been her series Nicolas et Adrien – A World with Two Sons, which consists of two collections: "Teen Tribe" (2005–2010) and "The Twenties" (2010–2018). Critic Vince Aletti commented in a New Yorker article:

Fougeron's pictures of Adrien or Nicolas sleeping or lounging about in Greenwich Village and the South of France have a lovely looseness and spontaneity, but they never feel like snapshots. Color energizes the work and adds to its sensual undertow.

Cory Jacobs, curator of the Gallery at Hermès in New York City, noted on Artsy.net:

The gaze is telling in these pictures. The boys are figuring out who they are and who they want to become while staring out at both their mother and the artist, the push and pull of separating from family while gaining strength from it. Growing up is not always easy, but Fougeron gracefully shows us the metamorphosis in all its complicated beauty.

Images from this series have been featured in solo exhibitions in New York City, Los Angeles, and Philadelphia as well as France, Korea, China, and Switzerland. They were highlighted at a New York Photo Festival by Ken Johnson of The New York Times, have received numerous awards and are in the permanent collections of several museums, including The Bronx Museum of the Arts, Museum of Fine Arts, Houston, and the Philadelphia Museum of Art.

A book on Fougeron's work from this series, Nicolas et Adrien – A World with Two Sons, was published by Steidl in 2019.

Chris Allnutt in FT Week End commented on the book in January 2020:

"In 2005, French-American photographer Martine Fougeron began taking pictures of her two sons (then aged 14 and 15) in New York. Seeking to capture the spontaneity of their adolescence, she shot them as they ate, smoked and dreamt their way towards adulthood. The result is Nicolas & Adrien, a collection of 159 intimate prints taken over the course of more than a decade ... An evolving cast of friends, girlfriends and pets picks up the slack, offering an enchanting and bohemian backdrop to the coming of age story created by the photographs. "

=== Summertime à Esparon (film) ===
Synopsis: A family story starting in the 50s in a deserted hamlet in France. The Director's relatives' photographs and 16mm films are presented along with her own photographic work and narration around the summertime theme.

Summertime à Esparon was awarded best short documentary at the AVOFF Festival, the Berlin Shorts Award, the Paris International Short Awards and the Brussels World Film Festival.

=== The South Bronx Trades ===
Images from this series were featured in a solo exhibition The South Bronx Trades at the Bronx Museum of the Arts in 2016, curated by Sergio Bessa. Peggy Roalf, in an article in Dart magazine, quoted Elisabeth Biondi, Visuals Editor at The New Yorker 1996–2011, Independent Curator, Writer and Teacher, on Fougeron's work:

Ms. Fougeron decided to cover photographically each trade in four different ways. Her compelling portraits focus on the working people; her striking landscapes place the project geographically; her environmental pictures are both informative and reflective; and her close-ups are simply beautiful abstractions. Together it adds up to a remarkable artistic document of Port Morris and Hunts Point.

== Solo exhibitions ==
- Martine Fougeron: SummerTime, Le Musée du Château d'Assas, Institut d’Art, Le Vigan, France (June 23 - September 17, 2023)
- Martine Fougeron: The South Bronx Trades at The Bronx Museum of the Arts, NY (April 6 – June 26, 2016)
- Martine Fougeron: Teen Tribe: The Gallery at Hermès, Fondation d'Entreprise Hermès, NY (09-20/11-08-2013). Co-presented with the interdisciplinary festival Crossing the Line organized with the French Institute Alliance Française
- After Prom from the Tête-à-Tête Series, Gallery 339, Philadelphia, PA (11-12-2010)
- Tête-à-Tête, Sol Mednick Gallery, The University of the Arts, Philadelphia, PA (10-12-2008)
- Tête-à-Tête, Peter Hay Halpert Fine Art, NY, NY (02-04-2008)
- Tête-à-Tête, Julia Dean Gallery, Berenice Abbott Prize, Los Angeles (02-03-2007)

== Selected group shows ==
- Documentation and Expression, Daejeon International Photo Festival, Daejeon Artist House, Korea (November 13–24, 2024)
- Le corps social : Documenter l'individu dans la société : codes et paradoxe, Galerie Miranda, Paris, France (March 12- April 13, 2024)
- Her City, curated by MarkCraig and Valeri Larko, Leake Street Gallery, London, UK (March 20-April 30, 2023)
- Catalyst: Art and Social Justice at Gracie Mansion Conservancy, February 24, 2020 – August 2021. Curated by Jessica Bell Brown.
- Objective/Subjective, NYPH 11, Brooklyn, NY, The Future of Contemporary Photography curated by Elisabeth Biondi (May 2011)
- Beyond Words: Photography in The New Yorker, Howard Greenberg Gallery, New York City, curated by Elisabeth Biondi (September–October 2011)
- Perchance to Dream, Andrea Meislin Gallery, New York City, (June–August 2013)
- Bronx X Bronx Bronx Documentary Center, Bronx, NY (May–June 2014)
- This Side of Paradise, Andrew Freedman Home, Bronx, NY, curated by Manon Sloan of No Longer Empty (April–June 2012)

== Publications ==
- Nicolas et Adrien – A World with Two Sons. Göttingen, Germany: Steidl 2019. ISBN 978-3-95829-685-5
- Tête-à-Tête. New York: Peter Hay Halpert Fine Art, 2008. ISBN 978-0-9814964-0-5
- Family Photography Now, by Sophie Howarth and Stephen McLaren, Thomas & Hudson, 2016. ISBN 978-0-500-54453-2.
- The Bronx Artist Documentary Project, 2015, ISBN 978-0-692-43275-4.
- Trees in Focus, Objectif Arbres, Anne Fontaine Foundation, Assouline Publishing, 2013, ISBN 9781614281092.
- Adolescence, Landscape Stories, Vulcano Publisher, Italy
- Legs through the Lens, Eyrolles Editions, November 2012

== Collections ==
Fougeron's work is held in the following public and private collections:

- Bronx Museum of the Arts, Bronx, New York
- Museum of Fine Arts, Houston, Houston, Texas
- Philadelphia Museum of Art, Philadelphia, Pennsylvania
- Getty Research Institute, Los Angeles, California
- Joe Baio collection
