= Curve 1 =

Studio album by Mura Masa
- Released: 23 August 2024
- Genre: Electronic
- Length: 48:00
- Label: Pond Recordings
- Producer: Mura Masa

Mura Masa chronology
| Demon Time (2022) | Curve 1 (2024) |

Curve 1 is the fourth studio album by British producer Mura Masa. It was released on 23 August 2024 by his independent imprint Pond Recordings. The album features a return by Crossan to club-oriented music.

== Background and release ==
Following Demon Time (2022), Crossan released Curve 1 independently on Pond Recordings, emphasizing a return to dancefloor-driven material. Crossan said of the record: "I wanted to make something no frills, no cynical music industry narrative, no manipulative backstory. Just music that I think is really great and that people can gather around."

The digital album arrived on 23 August 2024, with physical editions following later that autumn.

== Critical reception ==
Curve 1 received generally favourable reviews. The Guardian awarded it four stars, describing it as one of Crossan's most rhythmically inventive releases and noting its balance of dancefloor intensity with bittersweet undertones. DIY Magazine similarly praised its club focus and cohesion.

== Track listing ==
All tracks are written and produced by Mura Masa; featured vocalists noted.

1. "Whenever I Want" – 4:29
2. "gimme" – 6:39
3. "We Are Making Out" (featuring Yeule) – 2:50
4. "SXC" – 3:58
5. "Drugs" (featuring Daniela Lalita) – 4:01
6. "giddyup" – 4:04
7. "Shuf (Adore U)" – 3:46
8. "rep 4 me" – 3:32
9. "Still" – 6:08
10. "FLY (Extended Mix)" (featuring Cherish) – 9:20

== Personnel ==
- Mura Masa – production, instrumentation, programming
- Yeule – vocals (track 3)
- Daniela Lalita – vocals (track 5)
- Cherish – vocals (track 10)

== Release history ==
| Region | Date | Format | Label |
|---|---|---|---|
| Worldwide | 23 August 2024 | Digital download, streaming | Pond Recordings |
| Select markets | 25 October 2024 | LP, CD | Pond Recordings |
