= Tac Tac =

Single by Daniela Lalita
- Language: Spanish
- Released: June 2, 2026
- Genre: Latin; electronic; pop
- Length: 1:54
- Label: The Orchard\Inferno
- Songwriters: Daniela Lalita; Mietze Conte
- Producers: Daniela Lalita; Mietze Conte

Daniela Lalita singles chronology
"Tiroteo" (2026)	"Tac Tac" (2026)	"Aurora" (2026)

"Tac Tac" is a Latin electronic pop song by Peruvian musician Daniela Lalita, released on June 2, 2026. It was written and produced by Lalita and the Austrian musician Mietze Conte. The song was created using an experimental production approach based on Ableton Live's built-in plugins. The song received positive reviews from critics, who highlighted its playful and experimental qualities.

== Production and composition ==
"Tac Tac" was written and produced by Lalita and the Vienna-based musician Mietze Conte. Lalita mixed the track, and mastering was completed by Alec Ness.

Musically, the song combines Latin, electronic, and pop music influences. It is composed in C sharp major, set in common time, and has a tempo of 127 beats per minute. According to Lalita, the song was produced using only Ableton Live's built-in plugins, which were layered and used in unconventional ways. She said that the process informed the production techniques and sound design of her subsequent work. For the single cover, Lalita used a still from the set of the music video for "Tiroteo", in which she is seen striking a dance pose in El Callao, Peru.

== Lyrics ==
Lalita stated that the lyrics of "Tac Tac" were inspired by her idea of the devil as a playful yet selfish child who provokes situations and relationships to observe their reactions. She described the song as exploring themes of apathy and "innocent rebellion", concepts she said she also observed in nature. Teco Apple considers this to be a provocative commentary on human indifference and behavior.

== Release and reception ==
"Tac Tac" was released on June 2, 2026. The Fader praised the song's blend of playful and sinister elements, calling it a children's-song-inspired club track, while Remezcla described it as a fun yet ambitious song that successfully balances experimentation and pop appeal.

== Credits and personnel ==
Credits were adapted from Tidal.

- Daniela Lalita – lead vocals, songwriter, producer, mixing engineer
- Mietze Conte – songwriter, producer
- Alec Ness – mastering engineer
