= Jacky Connolly =

American filmmaker and video artist

Jacky Connolly (born 1990) is an American filmmaker and video artist.

== Artistic practice ==
Connolly is known for her machinima filmmaking technique. She often uses The Sims, a life simulation game that she first played in the early 2000s, to create her films.

In 2022, Connolly participated in the 2022 Whitney Biennial curated by Adrienne Edwards and David Breslin.

=== Filmography ===
- Hudson Valley Ruins, 2016
- Ariadne, 2019

=== Exhibitions and screenings ===
- Ariadne, Downs & Ross, Downs & Ross - Jun – Aug 2019
- Hudson Valley Ruins, Atlanta Contemporary - Dec 2016 – Jan 2017
- Hudson Valley Ruins, The Whitney Museum of American Art - Jan 2017

== Education ==
Connolly earned a BFA in Photography, Art History, and Critical Studies from Bard College at Simon's Rock in 2011. In 2016, she earned an MFA in Digital Arts and MSc in Library and Information Science from Pratt Institute.
