= Pilar Secada =

Peruvian architect, actress, and musician

- Occupations: Architect; actress; musician
- Children: Daniela Lalita

Pilar Secada (Spanish pronunciation: [piˈlar seˈcada]) is a Peruvian architect, former actress, and musician best known for portraying Angelita Pasco ("La Momia") in the television comedy series Mil oficios (2001). During the 1990s she performed as a backing vocalist with the Peruvian rock band La Liga del Sueño. After leaving television, she pursued a career in architecture and real-estate design.

== Early life ==
Pilar Secada was born to Doris Martínez and spent part of her childhood in Peru's central eastern Amazonian region, where her family lived among an Asháninka community. She later moved to Lima with her daughter, Daniela Lalita, and her mother, before relocating to New York after her daughter reached adulthood.

== Career ==
=== Music ===
During the 1990s, Secada played in several reggae and fusion bands, including as a chorist in La Liga del Sueño, a Peruvian rock band from Lima that was associated with members of the theater and television comedy troupe Patacláun. The group included performers such as Pelo Madueño and Johanna San Miguel. Secada contributed vocals to the band's 1996 album Por Tierra, including choir vocals on the track "Buscando a Mrs. Appleton". In 2004, she was a chorist in Tierra Sur & Pochi Marambio's album Le Pediste A Dios.

=== Television and acting ===
In 2001, Secada joined the cast of the comedy-drama series Mil oficios, produced by Efraín Aguilar for Panamericana Televisión. The program became one of the most successful and culturally influential Peruvian television series of the early 2000s, and is often regarded as a precursor to later productions such as Así es la vida and Al fondo hay sitio. Secada portrayed Angelita Pasco, nicknamed "La Momia", a socially awkward character whose appearance and comedic timing made her one of the show's memorable recurring roles. Peruvian media later compared the character to Betty la Fea, noting her distinctive comedic portrayal. In 2003, she portrayed Claudia in the premiere production of Aldo Miyashiro's play Un misterio, una pasión in Lima. Secada also appeared in the Peruvian film Mariposa negra (2006), where she played an English teacher. In later years, Secada occasionally appeared in projects by her daughter, musician and model Daniela Lalita, such as in the multimedia performance Madre: A Disruptive Environment in October 2017, and in several music videos.

=== Later career ===
After her brief involvement in television and music, Secada became an architect and works in real estate design.

== Personal life ==
Secada has lived internationally and participated in social and charitable events, including Help Perú in New York.

== Discography ==
With La Liga del Sueño

- Por Tierra (1996)

With Tierra Sur & Pochi Marambio

- Le Pediste A Dios (2004)

== Filmography ==
=== Television ===
- Mil oficios (2001) – Angelita Pasco ("La Momia")

=== Film ===
- Mariposa negra (2006) – English teacher
