= Folktronica =

Indie electronic music genre

- Stylistic origins: Electronica; folk; downtempo; glitch; IDM; indie music; post-rock
- Cultural origins: 1990s–2000s
- Typical instruments: Electronic; acoustic

Other topics
- Ethnic electronica; freak folk

Folktronica is a genre of indie electronic music incorporating elements of folk music and electronica, often featuring uses of acoustic instruments and incorporating delicate, textural sound design. The Ashgate Research Companion to Popular Musicology describes folktronica as "a catch-all [term] for all manner of artists who have combined mechanical dance beats with elements of acoustic rock or folk".

== History ==
The 1991 album Every Man and Woman is a Star by Ultramarine was described in a 2014 PopMatters article as a progenitor of the genre; it featured a pastoral sound and incorporated traditional instruments such as violin and harmonica with techno and house elements. The term folktronica was coined in the late 1990s, presumably first by the British press in reference to the musician Kieran Hebden (Four Tet). In the early 2000s, indie electronic acts such as Múm, Four Tet, Isan, Bibio and the Books began releasing formative music in the genre.

According to The Sunday Times Culture's Encyclopedia of Modern Music, essential albums of the genre are Four Tet's Pause (2001) and Rounds (2003), Tunng's Mother's Daughter and Other Songs (2005), and Caribou's The Milk of Human Kindness (2005), some of which had a cross-genre influence on artists such as Bruce Springsteen, Radiohead and J Dilla.

In addition to its roots in underground indie and electronic music, some commentators have noted that elements of folktronica entered the mainstream through pop artists who experimented with blending acoustic textures and electronic production. Madonna incorporated aspects of folktronica into her early-2000s work, particularly on her 2003 album American Life, after starting to explore a similar genre-crossing by blending country and dance-pop on Music (2000). She has been credited with helping to introduce the hybrid sound to a broader audience beyond the indie scene.

== See also ==
- List of folktronica artists
