= Anissa =

Anissa may refer to:

- "Anissa" (song), a song by French singer Wejdene

== People with the given name ==
- Anissa (given name)
- Anissa Abi-Dargham, American psychiatrist and member of the faculty of Columbia University
- Anissa Helou (born 1962), cookbook author, teacher, and chef
- Anissa Jones (1958-1976), American child actress
- Anissa Jones (politician), American politician
- Anissa Mack (born 1970), American contemporary artist
- Anissa Meksen (born 1988) French kick boxer
- Anissa Pierce, real identity of DC Comics superhero Thunder
