= Anssi =

Anssi is a given name. Notable people with the name include:

- Anssi Jaakkola (born 1987), Finnish footballer
- Anssi Joutsenlahti, pensioned vicar and a member of the parliament of Finland
- Anssi Juutilainen (born 1956), Finnish ski-orienteering competitor and world champion
- Anssi Karttunen (born 1960), Finnish cellist
- Anssi Kela (born 1972), Finnish singer-songwriter multi-instrumentalist who has published five albums
- Anssi Kippo (born 1976), platinum-selling Finnish producer who founded Astia-studios in 1994
- Anssi Koivuranta (born 1988), ski jumper, formerly Nordic combined skier from Finland
- Anssi Löfman, Finnish ice hockey player who currently plays professionally in Finland
- Anssi Melametsä (born 1961), retired professional ice hockey player
- Anssi Rantanen, Finnish ice hockey defenceman who currently plays professionally in Finland
- Anssi Salmela (born 1984), Finnish professional ice hockey defenceman
- Anssi Viren (born 1977), Finnish football player

ANSSI may also refer to:

- Agence nationale de la sécurité des systèmes d'information (National Cybersecurity Agency of France)

== See also ==
- ANSI (disambiguation)
- Anisi
- Anissa (disambiguation)
- Ansa (disambiguation)
- Anse (disambiguation)
- Ansei
- Anzi (disambiguation)
