= Anissa (given name) =

Name list

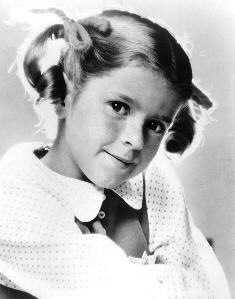
- American child actress Anissa Jones in 1970.
- Gender: Feminine
- Language: Arabic

Origin
- Meaning: “Friendly” or “Pure”

Other names
- Related names: Agnes, Anahit, Anaïs, Anis

Anissa or Anisa is a feminine given name derived from the Arabic language أنس (ʾanisa), meaning “to be friendly.”

Lebanese Maronite Christians also use the name as a form of Agnes because it derives from Persian Anahid, Anahit or Anaïs, meaning ‘immaculate’. The name was popularized during the 1960s and 1970s in the Anglosphere by child actress Anissa Jones, who portrayed Buffy Patterson-Davis on the American television series Family Affair.

== People ==
- Anissa Abi-Dargham, American psychiatrist and researcher
- Anissa Blondin (born 1992), Belgian model and beauty pageant titleholder
- Anissa Chan, Hong Kong educator
- Anissa Dellidj (born 1993), French-born Algerian footballer
- Anissa Haddaoui (born 1991), Dutch-Moroccan boxer, kickboxer, muay thai fighter and BJJ practitioner
- Anissa Hassouna (1953–2022), Egyptian politician
- Anissa Helou (born 1952), Lebanese-born British chef, teacher, and author
- Anissa Jones (1958–1976), American child actress
- Anissa Jones (politician), American politician
- Anissa Khedher (born 1980), French politician
- Anissa Khelfaoui (born 1991), Algerian Olympic fencer
- Anissa Lahmari (born 1997), French-born Moroccan professional footballer
- Anissa Mack (born 1970), American contemporary artist
- Anissa Meksen (born 1988), French-Algerian professional kickboxer, Muay Thai fighter, Savateur, and boxer
- Anissa Naouai (born 1982), American journalist and former television presenter
- Anissa Rawda Najjar (1913 – 2016), Lebanese feminist and women's rights activist
- Anissa Tann (born 1967), Australian soccer coach and former player
- Anissa Urtez (born 1995), American professional softball player
