= Anaïs (given name) =

- Gender: Female
- Language: Catalan, French

Origin
- Origin: Old Persian "Anahita"
- Meaning: Undefiled

Other names
- Alternative spelling: Anaís, Anais, Annais, Anaïse
- Variant forms: Anaise, Anaisa, Anaiss, Anays, Anayss, Naïs, Ani

Anaïs, Anaís, or Anais (French: [ana.is]) is a feminine given name.

== People with the given name ==
=== In literature ===
- Anaïs Nin (writer) (1903–1977), French-Cuban-American diarist, essayist, novelist and writer of short stories and erotica

=== In music ===
- Anaís (born 1984), Dominican Latin pop singer, winner of the second season of Objetivo Fama
- Anaïs (singer) (born 1965), French female singer, also part of duo Alice et Anaïs and the duo Anaïs et Didier Barbelivien
- Anaïs Cardot, French-Gabonese singer-songwriter
- Anaïs Delva (born 1986), French singer
- Anaïs Lameche (born 1987), Swedish singer
- Anaïs Mitchell (born 1981), American singer-songwriter and musician
- Anaïs Perrière-Pilte (1836–1878), French composer
- Anaís Vivas (born 1989), Venezuelan singer

=== In film and theater ===
- Anaís (actress) (born 1974), Mexican actress
- Anaïs Aubert, known as Mademoiselle Anaïs (1802–1871), French actress
- Anaïs Barbeau-Lavalette (born 1979), Canadian actress, film director, and screenwriter
- Anaïs Demoustier (born 1987), French actress
- Anaïs Fargueil (1819–1896), French actress
- Anais Granofsky (born 1973), Canadian actress, screenwriter, producer and director
- Anaïs Perrière-Pilte (1809–1878), French composer

=== In fashion ===
- Anais Catala, Iraqi-French model
- Anais Mali (born 1991), French model
- Anais Pouliot (born 1991), Canadian model
- Anaïs Veerapatren (born 1986), Mauritian beauty pageant

=== In sports ===
- Anaïs Bescond (born 1987), French biathlete
- Anaïs Caradeux (born 1990), French skier
- Anaïs Chevalier (born 1993), French biathlete
- Anais García Balmaña (born 1980), Spanish Paralympic swimmer
- Anaïs Lagougine (born 1988), French rugby union player
- Anaïs Laurendon (born 1985), French tennis player
- Anaïs Laurendon (born 1985), French tennis player
- Anaïs Michel (born 1988), French weightlifter
- Anaïs Morand (born 1993), Swiss figure skater
- Anais Oyembo (born 1980), Gabonese sprinter
- Anaïs Ribeyra (born 1992), French association footballer
- Anaïs Ventard (born 1996), French figure skater
- Anaïs Vincent (born 2000), French Para-cyclist

=== In other fields ===
- Anaïs Baydemir (born 1979), French-Turkish journalist and weather presenter
- Anaïs Napoleón (1831–1912), French-Spanish photographer
- Anaïs Toudouze (1822–1899), French artist and fashion illustrator
- Anaïse Kanimba, Rwandan activist

=== Fictional characters ===
- Anais Adler, portrayed by Eve O'Brien in Law & Order: Special Victims Unit (season 21, episode 8).
- Anais Barnes-Gaines, the daughter of Sheryll Barnes and Charlotte Gaines on FBI: Most Wanted
- Anais Six, one of the guardians―godlike computer programmes―in Railhead by Phillip Reeve.
- Anais Watterson, in the animated series The Amazing World of Gumball
- Anais, illegitimate daughter of King Foltest in The Witcher 2: Assassins of Kings video game
- Anaïs, portrayed by Anaïs Reboux in the film À ma sœur! (2001)
- Anais, the Latin American dub name for Fuu of Magic Knight Rayearth
- Madame Anaïs, brothel-keeper in the 1928 novel Belle de Jour and the 1967 film of the same name
- Saint Anais, Living Saint of Sisters of Battle Order of the Sacred Rose, in the video game Warhammer 40,000: Dawn of War – Soulstorm

== Wildlife ==
- Colibri d'Anaïs (Fr), also known as sparkling violetear (Colibri coruscans), is a species of hummingbird

== See also ==
- Anaïs (disambiguation)
