= Chris Baietta =

Venezuelan singer-songwriter (born 1984)

- Also known as: Less & Chris
- Born: Christopher John Baietta Manrrique; February 14, 1984 (age 42)
- Origin: Venezuela
- Genres: Reggaeton; Pop music
- Years active: 2005–present
- Formerly of: Equilibrio, Less & Chris

Christopher John Baietta Manrrique, (Barcelona, Venezuela, February 14, 1984), is a Venezuelan singer, songwriter and producer known by his stage name Chris Baietta. He was part of the group Equilibrio and the duo Less & Chris.

== Musical career ==
Chris Baietta began his musical journey after completing his basic education in Puerto La Cruz, Anzoátegui, deciding to participate in a casting for a group called Equilibrio, founded by Miguel Mendoza, better known as Nacho.

This selection process was attended by more than 300 people in search of fulfilling their musical dream, through this group that was appearing on the reality show Generación S, broadcast by the Venezuelan open signal channel Venevision. After a series of tests and preselections, Chris Baietta was officially called to join the ranks of Equilibrio.

=== Equilibrio (2005–2013) ===
In 2005, Chris Baietta, participated in the vocal quintet called Equilibrio (as Chris John), where he achieved many successes, among them with the song entitled "Dos Extraños", two promotional tours of Colombia; and interpret one of the musical themes of a successful telenovela called The Whole Life, broadcast by Venevisión. He was able to perform countless times on national stages, including the Poliedro de Caracas, in addition to a live performance, singing a duet with Franco de Vita. After eight years, the group disbanded, so Chris Baietta continued a series of activities, preparing to further advance his musical project.

=== Less & Chris (2014–2019) ===
In 2014, Chris Baietta undertook a new musical duet project called Less & Chris, managing to position himself at the top of the Venezuelan music charts, with hits such as "Pa´ que te actives" with Sixto Rein, "Rumba caliente", "Lagrimas no más Remix" with the famous group from Venezuela, Guaco, and "Me recordarás" alongside Gustavo Elis, among others. One of the most important achievements of the duo was a triple number one on the three most important billboards in their country: Record Report, National Report and Monitor Latino. They also had five nominations for the Pepsi Music Awards, which are awarded annually, under the sponsorship of that important company, in recognition of the best of Venezuelan music.

In 2015, they presented their album "Pa que te actives" at a concert in the city of Maracaibo. In 2016, they would launch "El Indicado". Then, when the duo decided to take a break from the stage, Chris Baietta entered the studios again to begin preparing what would be his first solo material.

=== Solo debut (2020–present) ===
In December 2020, Chris began a new stage in his musical career, as a soloist he released his first song entitled "Klobata", in collaboration with Troy La High and Fray Alvez. In 2021, he also presented "Ella me tiene" together with Niko La Fábrica and DAF 1012, and "Yo te conozco".

== Discography ==
=== With Equilibrio ===
- 2009: Me Recordarás

=== As Less & Chris ===
- 2015: Pa' que te actives

== Awards and nominations ==
In 2015, Less & Chris received three nominations at the Pepsi Music Awards as Urban Artist of the Year, Urban Theme of the Year and Urban Video of the Year with the song "Rumba Caliente".
