= Anaïs =

Anaïs, Anais or ANAIS may refer to:

== People ==
- Anaïs (given name), a female given name, especially popular in France and Greece (including a list of people with the name)
- Anaïs (singer) (born 1965), French singer
- Anaís (born 1984), Dominican Republic singer
- Anaís (actress) (born 1974), Mexican actress

== Places ==
- Anais, Charente, in the Charente department of France
- Anais, Charente-Maritime, in the Charente-Maritime department of France

== Science ==
- ANAIS, a particle detector experiment designed to detect dark matter

== See also ==
- Anaïs Anaïs, a perfume by the brand Cacharel that was launched in 1978
- Anahita (disambiguation)
