= Munaf Kapadia =

Founder of The Bohri Kitchen

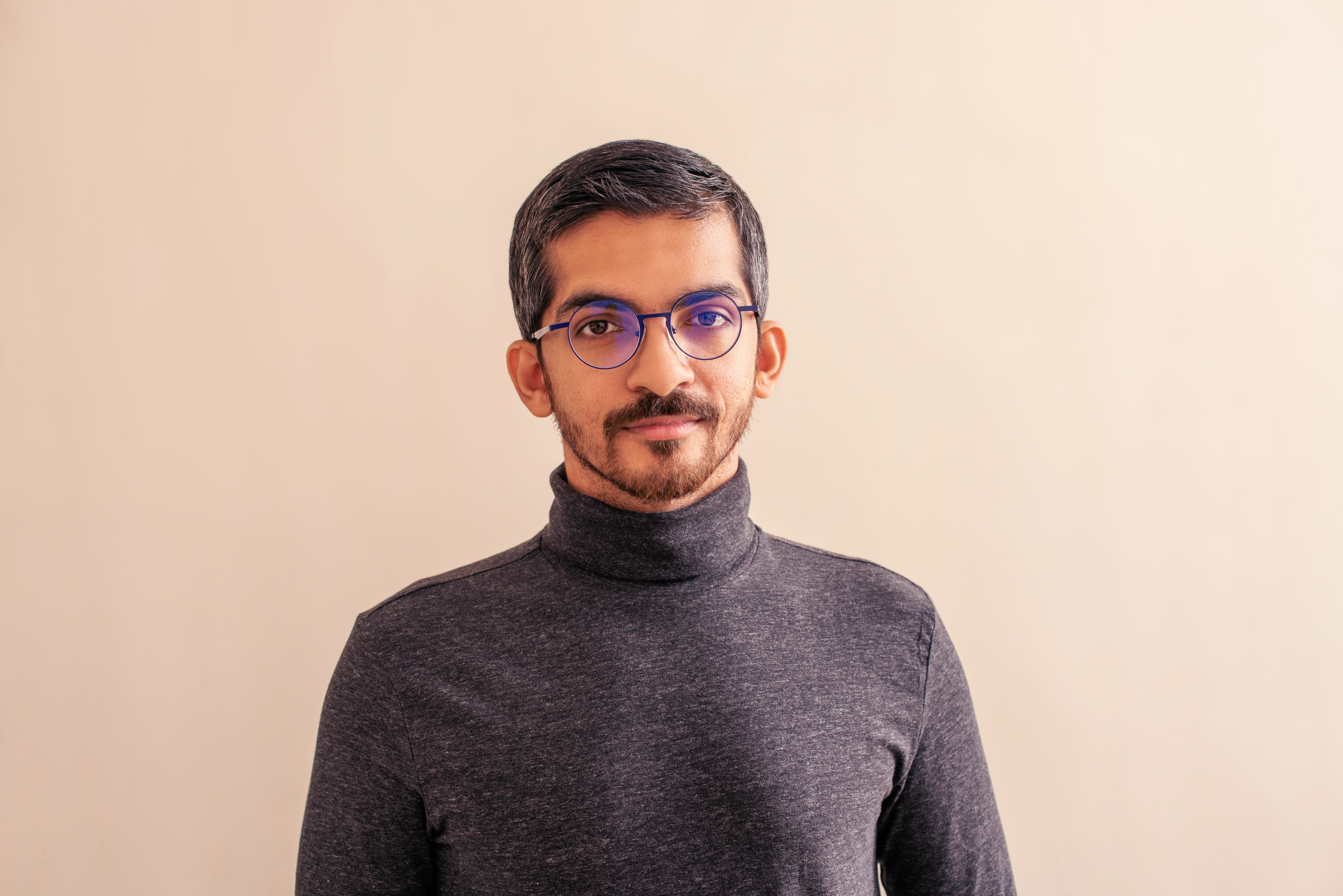
- Munaf Kapadia, 2020
- Born: 1988 (age 37–38); Mumbai, Maharashtra, India
- Education: Narsee Monjee Institute of Management Studies
- Occupations: Entrepreneur, author
- Writing career
- Language: English, Hindi
- Notable work: How I Quit Google to Sell Samosas
- Notable awards: Forbes 30 under 30

Munaf Kapadia is an Indian entrepreneur and author of the book How I Quit Google To Sell Samosas published by HarperCollins India in April 2021. He is the founder of The Bohri Kitchen and a Forbes 30 under 30 finalist (2017).

== Introduction ==
Munaf Kapadia (born 22 November 1988) is an Indian entrepreneur and author of the book How I Quit Google to Sell Samosas published by HarperCollins India. He is the founder of The Bohri Kitchen a food venture started by Kapadia and his mother in 2014. He was included in Forbes magazine's 30 under 30 list in 2017 for turning his mum's home cooked food into a renowned brand.

Munaf holds an MBA in marketing at SVKM's NMIMS and spent 4 years as Account analyst at Google India. In 2015, he quit his job at Google India to become the full time CEO of The Bohri Kitchen. The Bohri Kitchen began as a supper club run by Munaf and his mother that catered homemade Bohri food to guests in a sit-down experience at their home in Colaba. In 2017, Kapadia won the reality TV show Grilled, produced by Fox Life. In the same year he raised seed funding to set up cloud kitchens that would deliver Bohri food under The Bohri Kitchen brand.

In 2019, The Bohri Kitchen had five outlets across Mumbai. In 2020, HarperCollins India commissioned Munaf to write a book on his entrepreneurial journey, learnings and experiences running the Bohri Kitchen. The book – How I Quit Google to Sell Samosas, released worldwide in April 2021.

== Early life ==
Munaf Kapadia was born in Mumbai, India. He is the youngest of four children. He completed his school from Cathedral and John Connon School in Mumbai and attended H.R. College of Commerce and Economics and Narsee Monjee School of Commerce and Economics. In 2011, after graduating with an MBA in Marketing from SVKM NMIMs, Munaf joined Wrigley India as a trainee. He quit within 4 months to take up a role in Google India based out of Hyderabad.

== Career ==
Munaf started his career as a trainee with Wrigley India where he spent 3 months in Mysore as part of his training program in 2011. He quit Wrigley's and joined Google India in 2011 as an Analytical Lead. He spent 4 years at Google India before he resigned to become the full time Chief Eating Officer at The Bohri Kitchen.

The Bohri Kitchen is a food venture that Munaf started with his mother Nafisa Kapadia while he was still employed at Google India in 2014. He was inspired by his mother's cooking to start a weekend project under the brand name The Bohri Kitchen, a concept dining experience based out of the Kapadia home, allowed paid guests to experience the food and eating traditions of the Dawoodi Bohra community, on weekends.

The concept garnered press, critical acclaim and accolades from various quarters of the hospitality and film industry in Mumbai and India. The brand's immense popularity gained within a short period of time prompted Kapadia to quit his job at Google in July 2015. Since then, Munaf Kapadia and his mother have become the face of the Home Chef movement in India.

In 2016, Munaf set up a cloud kitchen in Worli out of which he did home deliveries for The Bohri Kitchen. In 2017, he raised 13.5 million in his first round of funding to scale the brands delivery footprint across Mumbai. In 2019, Munaf was operating 4 cloud kitchens and a Quick Service Restaurant outlet under The Bohri Kitchen generating a turnover of INR 40 million annually.

=== Author ===
In 2020, Munaf was commissioned by HarperCollins India to write a book about his experiences building and operating The Bohri Kitchen. The book How I Quit Google to Sell Samosas was released worldwide in April 2021.

== Reception ==
Munaf Kapadia has received praise and recognition for his work with The Bohri Kitchen in New York Magazine, Anissa Helou's book Feast: Food of the Islamic World (2018).

Kapadia has also cast a spotlight on the Dawoodi Bohra community, its rich cuisine and traditions through The Bohri Kitchen. He has also worked with the MTDC to boost tourism in the state through the promotion of regional cuisines. In 2017, Kapadia won the Fox Life's reality TV show Grilled. Munaf's efforts have been documented in travel and lifestyle publications such as Vogue India, Condé Nast Traveller and Verve Magazine.

Kapadia has been invited to share his journey as an entrepreneur on platforms such as TEDx and INK Talks.
