= Anais, Charente-Maritime =

Anais
- Commune
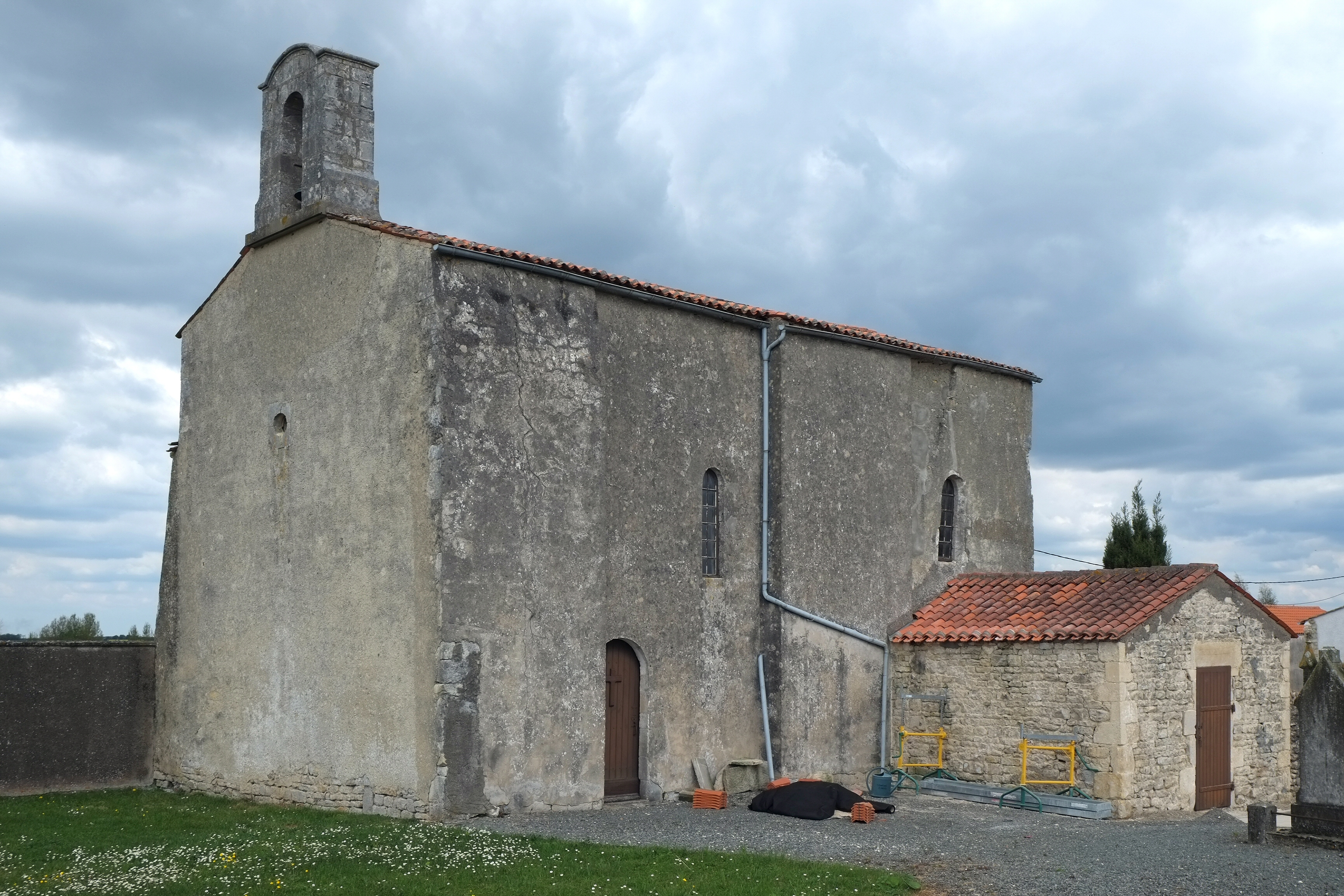
- The church in Anais
- Location of Anais
- Location within France Location within Nouvelle-Aquitaine
- Coordinates: 46°11′16″N 0°54′26″W
- Country: France
- Region: Nouvelle-Aquitaine
- Department: Charente-Maritime
- Arrondissement: Rochefort
- Canton: La Jarrie
- Intercommunality: Aunis Sud

Government
  - Mayor (2020–2026): Hervé Gaildrat
- Area^{1}: 9.44 km^{2} (3.64 sq mi)
- Elevation: 16 m (52 ft)
- Highest elevation: 29 m (95 ft)
- Lowest elevation: 3 m (9.8 ft)
- Population (2023): 314
  - Density: 33.3/km^{2} (86.2/sq mi)
- Time zone: UTC+01:00 (CET)
  - Summer (DST): UTC+02:00 (CEST)
- INSEE/Postal code: 17007 /17540
- ^{1} French Land Register data, which excludes lakes, ponds, glaciers > 1 km^{2} (0.386 sq mi or 247 acres) and river estuaries.

Anais (French pronunciation: [anɛ]; Occitan: Anaïs) is a commune in the Charente-Maritime department in the Nouvelle-Aquitaine region of southwestern France.

== Geography ==
Anais is located some 15 km east of La Rochelle and 5 km south by south-east of Nuaille-d'Aunis. It can be accessed by the D107 road from Dompierre-sur-Mer in the west passing through the centre of the commune south of the village and continuing to Bouhet. The D113 road also comes from Virson in the south passing through the southern part of the commune and continuing north-east to Le Gué-d'Alleré. Access to the village in the north of the commune is only by small country roads running off the D107 and the D113. Apart from the small village of Anais there is also a larger village called Les Grandes-Rivieres located on the D113 road.

The Curé stream forms the eastern boundary of the commune and the Virson forms the northern part of the western boundary and they both meet at a place called le Gouffre (the Pit) which is the start of the Canal du Curé on the municipal boundary of the neighbouring commune of Angliers.

The small village of Anais is built on a low limestone hill, at an altitude of about 13 metres. It is surrounded by numerous marshes, being located in the southern part of the Marais Poitevin which belongs geographically and historically to the plain of Aunis.

It is in this part of the Marais Poitevin that the course of the Curé enters the vast marshy bowl after leaving the last calcareous soils of Aunis in the neighbouring commune of Bouhet.

== Administration ==
List of Successive Mayors

From	To	Name	Party	Position
2001	2014	Gérard Grelier	SE	Retired
2014	2020	Bruno Gautronneau	DVG	
2020	2026	Hervé Gaildrat		

== Population ==
The inhabitants of the commune are known as Anaisiens or Anaisiennes in French.

Historical population
Year	Pop.	±% p.a.
1968	197	—
1975	195	−0.15%
1982	211	+1.13%
1990	231	+1.14%
1999	210	−1.05%
2007	284	+3.85%
2012	326	+2.80%
2017	320	−0.37%
2023	314	−0.31%
Source: INSEE

== Sites and Monuments ==
- The Church of Saint Peter from the 10th century.

== Transport ==
=== Nearest Railway Stations and Halts ===
- Surgères (TGV) 14 km
- Mer 17.8 km
- Aytré (halt) 18.1 km
- Mauzé-sur-le-Mignon (halt) 18.2 km
- Châtelaillon 18.5 km

=== Nearest Airport and aerodromes ===
- La Rochelle (Laleu) 22.1 km
- Rochefort-Saint-Agnant 33.8 km
- Niort-Souché 41.4 km

== See also ==
- Communes of the Charente-Maritime department
