= Miss Mujerzuela =

Studio album by Caramelos de Cianuro
- Released: August 22, 2000
- Recorded: 2000
- Genre: Latin rock
- Label: Latin World
- Producer: Caramelos de Cianuro Diego Márquez

Caramelos de Cianuro chronology
Harakiri City (1996)	Miss Mujerzuela (2000)	Frisbee (2003)

Miss Mujerzuela is the third album of the Venezuelan Latin Rock group Caramelos de Cianuro.

== Members ==
- Asier Cazalís (Vocalist)
- Alfonso Tosta (Drummer)
- Luis Golding (Bassist)
- Miguel González "El Enano" (Guitarist)

== Track listing ==
1. Asunto Sexual
2. La Llama
3. El Flaco
4. Las Estrellas
5. Veterana
6. Enfermo
7. Lava Blanca
8. Verónica
9. Misteriosa
10. Is it tonight?
11. Las Estrellas (acoustic)

== Guest musicians ==
- Percussion: Mauricio Arcas (tracks 01, 03, 05, 06, 07)
- Keyboards: Oswaldo Rodríguez (tracks 01, 03, 05, 06, 07, 08, 09) and Manuel Dizquez (track 02)
- Sequences: Oswaldo Rodríguez (tracks 02,10) and Manuel Dizquez (track 11)
- Trumpet: José Luis Osuna (track 06)
- First Violin: Alejandro Serna (track 04)
- Second Violin: Eddie Cordero (track 04)
- Viola: Pedro Tosta (track 04)
- Cello: Arturo Serna (track 04)
- Background Vocals: Ana Valencia, María José Valencia (tracks 04, 11) and Mariana Valencia & Vanessa Rodríguez (track 04)
