= Caramelos de Cianuro (album) =

Studio album by Caramelos de Cianuro
- Released: 2010
- Recorded: 2009
- Genre: Latin rock
- Length: 39:30
- Producer: Caramelos de Cianuro

Caramelos de Cianuro chronology
En Vivo (2009)	Caramelos de Cianuro (2010)

Caramelos de Cianuro is a studio album from the Venezuelan Latin rock band Caramelos de Cianuro.

== Members ==
- Asier Cazalís (Vocalist)
- Alfonso Tosta (Drummer)
- Pável Tello (Bassist)
- Miguel González "El Enano" (Guitarist)

== Track listing ==
1. Verano
2. Infierno VIP
3. Rubia Sol Morena Luna
4. Estrógeno
5. La Casa
6. 2 Caras 2 Corazones
7. Yo No Quiero Más Calor
8. Adiós Amor
9. La Carretera
10. Un Poco Solo
11. Lobby
