= ANSI (disambiguation) =

ANSI is the American National Standards Institute, a private nonprofit organization that oversees the development of voluntary consensus standards.

ANSI may also refer to:

== Computing ==
- ANSI character set (disambiguation)
- ANSI escape code sequences, an in-band signalling mechanism for terminals and terminal emulators
- ANSI, BASIC programming language standards

== Places ==
- Ansi City, an ancient city of the Goguryeo in modern Anshan city, China
- Ansi, Estonia, village in Saaremaa Parish, Saare County, Estonia

== People ==
- Al-Ansi, Arab tribe
- Aswad Ansi, Arab false prophet
- Ansi Agolli (born 1982), Albanian football player
- Ansi Molina
- Ansi Nika (born 1990), Albanian football player
- Nasser bin Ali al-Ansi (1975–2015), Al-Qaeda leader

== Other uses ==
- Area of Natural and Scientific Interest, used by the Government of Ontario, Canada to classify land zones
