= Desorden Público =

Venezuelan ska band

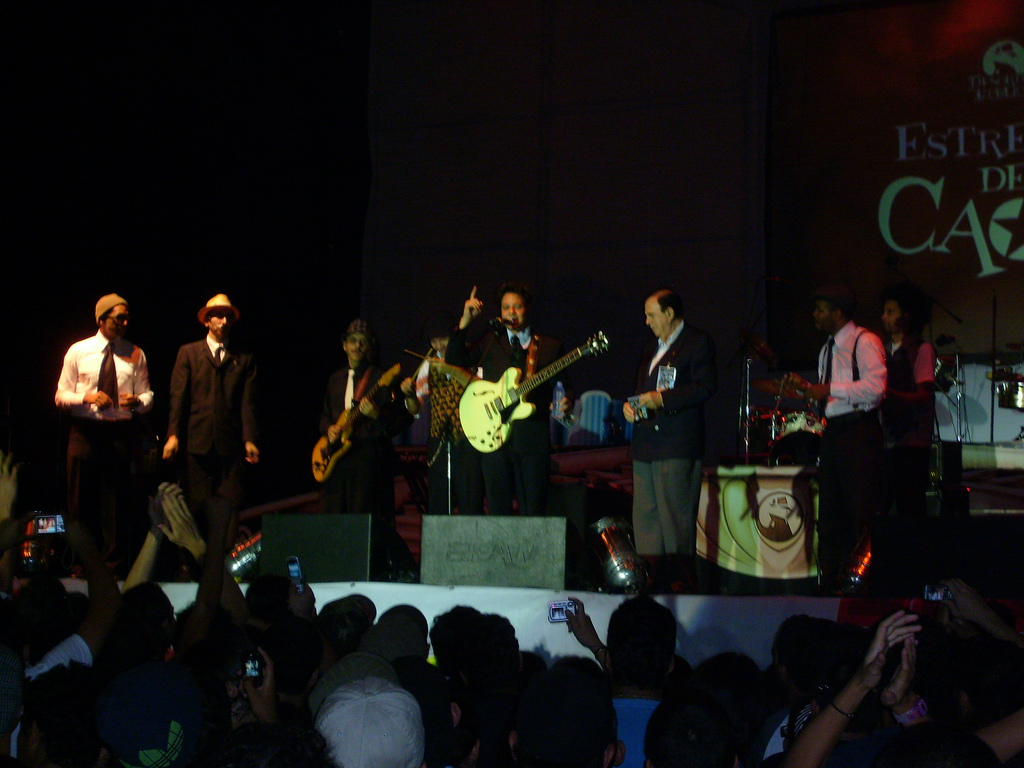

Background information
- Origin: Caracas, Distrito Capital, Venezuela
- Genres: Ska, Rock en español, Reggae
- Years active: 1985–present
- Labels: Sony, Guerra
- Members: Horacio Blanco; José Luis "Caplís" Chacín; Danel Sarmiento; Oscarelo; Magu; Hernan

Desorden Público is a Grammy nominated ska band founded in 1985 in Caracas, Venezuela.

The band's music mixes ska, latin rock, reggae and traditional Latin music styles. The group's lyrics are known for commenting on Venezuela's and Latin America's politics and society. Influenced by the English 2 Tone movement, Desorden Público's embraces different languages and promotes racial and social tolerance. The band has a dozen or so releases to their name and have had platinum sales, No. 1 and top 10 hits. They have tours that have taken them all over Latin America, North America and Europe.

Desorden Público was named Ska Artist of the Year at the Pepsi Venezuela Music Awards in 2012, 2013, 2014, 2015, and 2017.

== Discography ==
- Desorden Público (CBS, 1988). LP, reedited in CD in 1993
- En Descomposición (CBS, 1990)
- Canto Popular de la vida y muerte (1994)
- Plomo Revienta (1997)
- ¿Donde está el Futuro? (1998) compilation
- Diablo (2000)
- Todos sus éxitos (Sony Music, 2001), compilation
- The Ska Album (Megalith, 2004) compilation for the United States
- DP18 En Concierto (2004)
- Estrellas del Caos (2006)
- Sex (2006)
- Los Contrarios (2011)
- En Vivo - Teatro Teresa Carreño (2013)
- Orgánico - Rarezas Acústicas Vol.1 (2014)
- Guarachando en Navidad (2014)
- Bailando sobre las ruinas (2017)
- Pa' Fuera (2017)
