= Estrellas del Caos =

Album of the Venezuelan Ska band Desorden Público

Studio album by Desorden Público
- Released: 2006
- Recorded: 2005–2006
- Genre: Ska
- Label: Radio Pirata

Desorden Público chronology
Radio Pirata (2004)	Estrellas del Caos (2006)	Los Contrarios (2006)

Estrellas del Caos is a 2006 album, of the Venezuelan Ska band Desorden Público. It includes seventeen tracks.

== Track listing ==
1. El caos en clave / Presentación
2. Hardcore Mambo
3. Hipnosis
4. No vale la pena
5. Antarjami
6. Espiritual
7. El Tren de la vida
8. Pegajoso
9. Crack
10. San Antonio
11. Baila mi cha cha ska
12. Uma Vacina
13. Sepulturero
14. Política criminal
15. Monkey ska
16. La Mona cumbita
17. Ella me espera

== See also ==
- Venezuela
- Venezuelan music
- Desorden Público
