= Huáscar Barradas =

Venezuelan musician

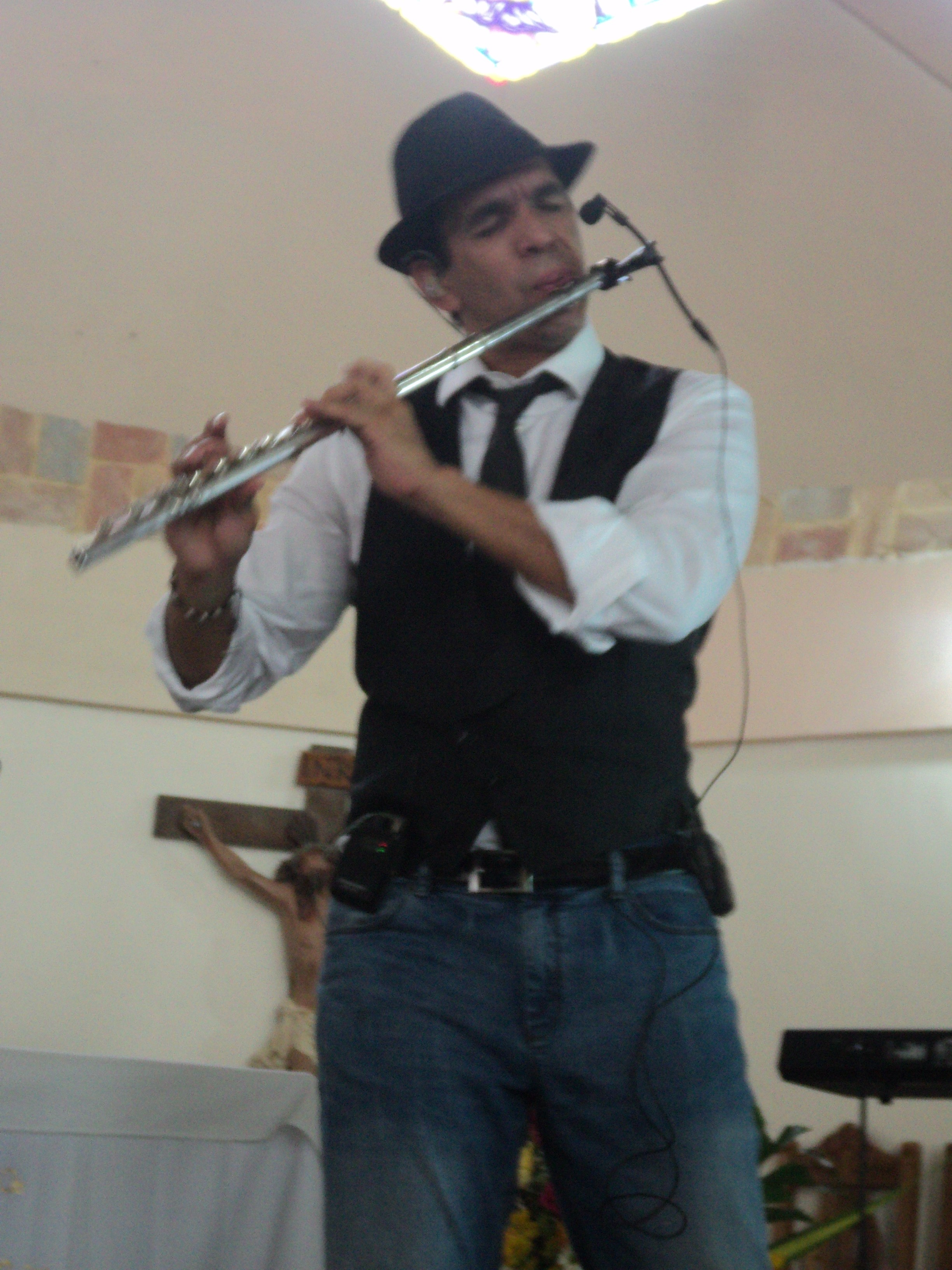
- Born: 1964 (age 61–62); Maracaibo, Venezuela
- Awards: Pepsi Venezuela Music Awards (2012, 2013)
- Website: www.huascarbarradas.com

Huáscar Barradas (born 1964) is a Venezuelan flautist and Professor of flute at the "Instituto Universitario de Estudios Musicales" in Caracas. As a flutist he has represented Venezuela at a range of international festivals and as both soloist and symphonic musician plays a wide range of music types. Barradas was the principal flute of Orquesta Filarmónica Nacional. As teacher previously has worked at the National Youth Orchestra of Venezuela and taught his course "The art of performing the flute" at different Conservatories in and out of Venezuela.

== Early life ==
He began his musical studies at the José Luis Paz Conservatory in his hometown of Maracaibo, in Venezuela. He also became a founding member of the first Children's National Orchestra, part of the National Network of Youth and Children's Orchestras of Venezuela (the world-renowned "El Sistema"). Along with his academic program, Huáscar began to play traditional Venezuelan music with the Estudiantina Juvenil, in the state of Zulia.

At the age of 12, Huáscar gave his first solo concert, and at 16, he joined La Máxima, a Caribbean-music band. At 17, he went to the United States, where he attended San Jacinto College in Texas and immediately won the Texas Junior College Competition. He then went to New York City to study at the Brooklyn College Conservatory with the great North American flutist Bernard Goldberg. He studied jazz at the City College of New York with jazz legend Ron Carter, and conducting with Vincent LaSelva at the Juilliard School of Music.

After graduating cum laude with a bachelor's degree in music performance, Huáscar returned to Venezuela, where he played for a year as the principal flutist for the Symphonic Orchestra of Maracaibo. He soon won a scholarship from the German government, which gave him the opportunity to study at Frankfurt's Superior School of Music. Once there, he studied baroque music with two eminent musicians: flutist and conductor Michael Schneider and Dutch flutist Dr. Mirijam Nastasy. He also attended master classes with such renowned flutists as Aurèle Nicolet and Peter Lukas Graf from Switzerland, and Robert Aitken from Canada. He remained in Germany for 5 years and there he recorded his first album Huáscar Barradas: Folklore from Venezuela, in 1992.

Huáscar returned to Venezuela and became the second flutist with the National Philharmonic Orchestra of Venezuela. The following year he was selected as the second flutist for the Municipal Symphonic Orchestra of Caracas. Upon his return to Venezuela he formed his own band, Huáscar Barradas y Maracaibo, that played with the influence of multiple rhythms: Venezuelan and Latin American folkloric music combined with the influences that he had acquired from his time in the United States and in Europe, including classical music, jazz, pop, hip-hop, and other contemporary trends.

== Huáscar Barradas Band ==
Huáscar continues to perform with his band in international venues. The band is composed of Elvis Martínez, bass; Diego "El Negro" Álvarez, percussion; Fernando Valladares, drums; Jonathan "Morocho" Gavidia, Afro-Venezuelan percussion; Miguel Siso, cuatro; Gilberto Ferrer, musical keyboard; Simón Bolívar, Caribbean percussion; Eduardo Betancourt, harps; and Hugo Fuguet, electric guitar.

== Recognitions and awards ==
Among multiple awards in Venezuela and abroad, Huáscar was nominated twice for the Latin Grammy: first in 2011 for the best long video for "Entre Amigos 2", and again in 2013 for the best instrumental album for Dos Mundos 2 with pianist Leopoldo Betancourt.

He was named Traditional Music Artist of the Year at the Pepsi Venezuela Music Awards in 2012 and 2013.

== Discography ==
- Folklore from Venezuela, 1993
- La Nueva Onda de La Música Venezolana, 1996
- Mundo Nuevo, 1997
- Gracias a la Vida, 1998
- Candela, 2001
- Trío Acústico Venezolano, 2002
- Encuentros, 2004
- Trío Acústico Venezolano No. 2, 2005
- My Favourite Thing, 2008
- Latineando, 2006
- Inéditos, 2007
- Reinvención, 2008
- Entre Amigos 2, 2009
- Dos Mundos, 2010
- Gaiteando, 2010
- Hallacas con Flauta 2, 2012
- Dos Mundos 2, 2012
- Karibe, 2013
