= Guaco (band) =

Venezuelan band

Guaco is a tropical music band from Venezuela that was formed in Maracaibo by Mario Viloria, Alfonso "Pompo" Aguado, and Fernando Domínguez in 1968. Viloria, the main founder, retired to focus on his college studies; he was the group's main composer for several years. His home was also the main place where practices were held in the group's early years. The name Guaco is attributed a bird named "Guaco" that would fly over Viloria's house every morning. The band began as a gaita zuliana group, and during the 70s diverged from the traditional way of playing the genre by integrating it with elements of salsa music (such as complex horn arrangements), and adding in violins and electric guitars which were very unusual instruments to be included in a gaita band. Today, the Guaco rhythm continues to evolve through a complex mixture of Gaita, Salsa, pop, jazz, funk and even rock and roll and Vallenato rhythms, concocting a recognizable and unique style that is considered to be a hallmark of the tropical music genre.

Guaco won Pepsi Venezuela Music Awards for Tropical Video of the Year in 2012, for Artist of the Year, Album of the Year, Song of the Year, Tropical Video of the Year, and Tropical Artist of the Year in 2013, for Best Tropical Artist in 2014, and for Salsa Song of the Year, Salsa Video of the Year, Tropical Fusion Album of the Year, and Album of the Year in 2015.

== Origin ==
It was founded by a group of young students, of which Mario Viloria, Fernando Plátano Domínguez, Alfonso Pompo Aguado and Luis Rincón stand out, later Gustavo Aguado joined. They aspired to compete with groups with a greater Gaita tradition existing at the time in the State of Zulia, such as Estrellas del Zulia, Rincón Morales, El Saladillo and Cardenales del Éxito.

In the beginning, they are part of the group: Maritza Morales who becomes the female voice, José Castillo cuatrista and composer, Heriberto Molina and the singers Alcides Bonilla, José Tineo and Tino Rodríguez. Along with them was Gustavo Adolfo Aguado León, Alfonso's brother who was already projecting himself as a soloist, but required special permission to perform, as he was a minor at the time.

The creation and the name of the group are attributed to Mario Viloria who takes the name of a white bird, colloquially known there as Halcón guaco to baptize the group, since a specimen of this bird flew over his house where the group practiced and rehearsed during its beginnings.

== Trajectory ==
=== Sixties ===
In the 1960s the group was known as Conjunto Gaitero Estudiantil Los Guacos del Zulia (The Student Gaitero Ensemble Los Guacos del Zulia). Their first production was recorded in 1964, under the Zulian Gaita genre, a style of traditional Venezuelan music that is traditionally played at Christmas. However, from their first albums, the desire to do something different and massive, was noticeable. In the 1960s, five productions were recorded, one per year: 1964, 1965, 1966, 1968, 1969. Most of the songs were composed by Mario Viloria. In 1967 Gustavo Aguado recorded with another Gaita group (Estrellas del Zulia), coincidentally the same year that Guaco would not record a production. Aguado returned to record in 1968 and continue to date.

In this first stage, Guaco was a traditional gaita group, without any electronic or non-typical elements, but in their lyrics and voice ensemble they hinted that they were looking for a contemporary sound in accordance with their personal tastes that chose between rock, sauce and soul.

SIDENOTE:The spanish word "gaita" originally refers to bagpipes, both the instrument and music made with. However, within the context of Venezuelan popular music, it has nothing to do with bagpipes and the word should therefore not be translated, just as much as the musical style Rock'n Roll needs not be translated into other languages.

=== Seventies ===
The 1970s are marked by the entry of Ricardo Hernández from the Santanita group. The talent of this Zulian begins to be projected from his first albums, reaching quotas of greater participation from 1979 and until 1985 when he becomes the most successful composer that the band has had.

Other famous singers who did internships within this stage were: Humberto Mamaota Rodríguez as composer and singer in 1972 and Argenis Carruyo, who would later opt for salsa in orchestras such as Dimension Latina. Argenis participates singing specific themes in several of the albums from this stage, among them: Bubu Guaco in 1972; Let nobody move in 1975 and A grave and a bongo in 1978, the latter two composed by Ricardo Hernández.

Later in 1975 the composers and singers Ricardo Portillo and Simón García entered, who had triumphed with Los Cardenales del Éxito. The first of them was a composer, cuatrista, singer and natural leader, while the second stood out for being a composer and creative.1

At the beginning of the 70s the arrangements of the songs were in charge of Nerio Franco, a multi-instrumentalist who came from the Los Blanco orchestra and who began as the group's pianist.3 Starting in 1977, the young pianist and orchestra director José Luis García, who would later form the successful group Carángano, assumes the reins of the musical direction of the band.

The central idea of the group at this time was to incorporate contemporary instruments with which the passage from the traditional Gaita to modernity was marked. Carlos Sánchez on bass, Romer Quintero and later Salvador Baglieri on guitar, Frank Velásquez on flute and sax from 1979 and a rhythm section that from 1978 included tamboras, conga and bongo.

Within this stage they also develop gaitas with lyrics that address contemporary issues such as drug use, poverty and pollution and others of a humorous nature whose most popular theme was "María La Bollera" (1976). This thematic and rhythmic variety and strong support from national record companies with productions and recordings made in Caracas opened the way for them to be well received by the youth of the time and to begin a process of opening up to other regions of the country where it was not. Zulian gaita is usual.

=== Stage 1979–1985 ===
The Guaco 79 album constitutes a turning point from which a leap in quality is made that would close the 70's. From this album, Guaco began to be known within the public and stations throughout the country.

Of the eleven songs that make up the album, six belong to Ricardo Hernández, who positions himself as Guaco's composer par excellence. This work has a conceptual character and a perfect mix between tradition and modernity and between partying and reflective character. Guaco achieves the consolidation and balance that had been developing since previous albums. César Miguel Rondón, author of El Libro de la Salsa, is in charge of writing a long analysis of the characteristics and songs of this album inside the album cover, classifying it as extraordinary.

The arrangements of this album are the responsibility of José Luis García and Gustavo Aguado interprets in full maturity, four of the most emblematic songs of the album, among them: «Noche sensational», later recorded by Cheo Feliciano on the album Sentimiento Tú (1980), paying a kind of homage to the music of Guaco.

The music of protest without reaching the political pamphlet is present in the songs: "Mosaico guaco" and "Our rights", which in the voice of Aguado reflect the feeling of Zulia who, through a hardship that has become daily, assumes his rage social through protest in songs.

This album marks the debut of Amilcar Boscan as a Guaco singer with a contradanza with montuno called: «Tribute to Aniceto Rondón». Chichilo Urribarri is called to sing: "Maracaibo Linda", a bagpipe with a great rhythmic cadence and effective lyrics, and Ricardo Portillo sings what is probably the best-known song on the album: "Venite pa' Maracaibo".

After this disc a massive desertion takes place, they leave the band: the pianist and musical director José Luis García, the singers Simón García and Ricardo Portillo, the guitarist Salvador Baglieri, the bassist Carlos Sánchez and Argenis Carruyo. These musicians, feeling the need to tackle new projects independently, form other groups and orchestras that ultimately enriched the musical panorama of Zulia and the country.

The first part of the 1980s is marked by the notable influence of Ricardo Hernández as a composer and Amilcar Boscan as a singer. Sundin Galué entered the group as bassist and singer until 1995, Alejandro Ávila played the piano until 1981 and was later replaced by Alirio Pérez between 1982 and 1988, Frank Velásquez remained on sax and flute until 1988 and Romer Quintero played the guitar until 1986.

Guaco 80 was recorded with this group, an album with 10 songs, 8 of which are by Ricardo Hernández, who also introduced his talent as an arranger. In this sense, the musician has declared: «The album Guaco 80 is mine; They are my arrangements and my songs.”4

The compositions that were most widely distributed were: «Homenaje a Jesús Lozano» and «Las Pulgas», in the voice of Amílcar Boscan. Another of the songs of great popularity was: "Maracucha", in the unmistakable voice of Gustavo Aguado. A song initially recorded without brass that was later added, in an arrangement made in Caracas, by Alberto Naranjo, director of Trabuco Venezolano. He also highlighted the song dedicated to the Virgin of Chiquinquirá, "Chinita", whose arrangements and polyphonies gave it an air of modernity that contrasted with those gaita groups that never took risks and remained faithful to tradition.

It remains within the repertoire of this album, lyrics of social denunciation (an idea that has always been present in the founders of Guaco) with bagpipes such as: "La reforma", an old song by Mario Viloria that had been recorded on the 1970 LP where he addresses the problems that Maracaibo has suffered for years and that have never been solved and "Differendum" at the time when Venezuela and Guyana maintained a territorial dispute.

The album Guaco 1981 confirms the artistic level reached in the two previous LPs. Ricardo Hernández remains as musical director and composer of eight of the songs on the album. The rhythmic and harmonic concept of the band belongs to the musicians born in Zulia and whose sound quality is beginning to make itself felt. At the sales level, they are promoted by the INTEGRA record label from 1979 to 1983. Therefore, within the promotion of the band that everyone wants to label within a musical genre, the criterion that "Guaco is Guaco" is maintained.

Amílcar Boscan consolidates himself as a fundamental interpreter with the songs: «El billetero», «A patinar» and «Tierra bonita». Gustavo Aguado repeats as an interpreter of a theme dedicated to the virgin: "Chinca y Ricardo" and another to Guayana Esequiba with the song: "Esequibo". Another of the songs that had media coverage due to its intimate and romantic nature was: "I will continue to gaiteando", in the voice of Sundin Galué, where the topic of the pipers' wives who feel "threatened" by the way of life dissipated or committed to the art carried by musicians.

A year later and with the same musical group, Guaco premiered its new long-playing album in 1982. The Hernández-Boscan duo repeated their successful association with the songs: «Pastelero» and «Por eso me feliz mi Maracaibo». Gustavo Aguado reserves the songs "Para ella" and "Para ti Chinita" by Ricardo Hernández himself.

The year is 1983 and Guaco records his fifth and last studio album for the Integra label. At this time, Guaco continues its modernization process, adding drums, a trumpet section, a trombone and violins under the executive production of the experienced Orlando Montiel. Amílcar Boscan debuts as a composer with the song "El Pavito" and also records the songs: "Cepilla'o" and "Adiós Miami", a song referring to middle-class Venezuelans who used to travel to the USA because of how cheap the dollars were. and that in that year they were subjected to exchange control and a strong devaluation of the currency.

Between 1984 and 1985 two albums were produced and recorded with the Sonographic label, a label for which the most renowned artists in the country recorded: Yordano, Ilan Chester and Franco de Vita. The band is an obligatory reference throughout the national territory, their albums increase their sales exponentially and in December they give massive concerts in various venues in the country, including the Poliedro de Caracas.

=== Stage 1986–1995 ===
The album called Guaco Tercera Temporada published in 1986 marks a turning point within the Zulian band marked by the departure of Ricardo Hernández and Amilcar Boscan. Daniel Somaróo and Sundin Galúe take center stage as singers and Heriberto Molina, a former Guaco collaborator, contributes the bulk of the songs, composing six of the ten that make up the album. The best-known songs of this production were performed by Gustavo Aguado: "Aguas de cristal" and "Virgen Guaquera" a bagpipe-aguinaldo dedicated to Chinita that included the participation of the group of singers from the Sonografica label: Franco De Vita Yordano, Ilan Chester, Colina (singer), Francisco Pacheco and Evio Di Marzo and it was a national success. «La radio», in the voice of Daniel Somaróo was another of the promoted songs.

Maduro (1987) and Leave a Mark (1988) are Guaco's next works in which the production passes from Gustavo Aguado to Willie Croes. Nelson Arrieta began his extensive career as a singer of the group that would last until 2002. The most outstanding songs were: "Zapatero", "Ask Carruyo" and "Cuatro Temporadas", all composed by Abdenago Neguito Borjas, who manages to be captured as a composer. for the group, after several attempts to incorporate him as a member of the band, in the 70s.

Betania 1989 is the last album produced for the Sonografía label. Four songs stood out and achieved wide diffusion within the country: "Fatal Attraction", "Let Nobody Move", "Sara" and "La Placita", the latter had a great media impact due to the participation of national artists: Cecilia Todd, Yordano, Elisa Rego, Sergio Pérez and Luz Marina.

From 1990 to 1993 Guaco became part of Sonorodven with whom he recorded five albums. Those corresponding to the years 90 and 91 were performed under the musical direction of Juan Carlos Salas. The most popular songs were: "I will never forget you" (a duet with Karina), "You are no longer you" (a duet with Gilberto Santa Rosa), "Invite me to your house" (with Project M) and "You are taking me" in the voice of Gustavo Aguado.

Later they recorded the first two volumes of Guaco Clásico where they paused in their innovation process to record traditional Zulian bagpipe songs and included some versions of their songs from the early stages with less elaborate instrumentation adapted to the traditional bagpipe, but without ceasing to include elements of modernity: "The arrival of peace" (a duet with Luis Enrique) is the newest theme and the one that was promoted to the greatest extent.

The cycle with Sonorodven closes with the album Triceratops published in 1993 and which marks the entry of Jorge Luis Chacín from Zulia as performer, composer and arranger. This album is considered by many to be one of the group's best productions. In this production, the singer Nelson Arrieta stands out with the song "Everything was left". The singer Kiara is a guest on the song “Always together”, Rafael Greco ―Zulian musician and composer who would join Guaco as a saxophonist― composes and sings in homage to Giusseppe Peppino Terenzio (musician and founding professor of the José Luis Paz conservatory in Maracaibo) the theme "My Uncle". "Detail in false" (authored by Jorge Luis Chacín) together with "Las caraqueñas" (by José Quintero), both in the voice of Gustavo Aguado, make up one of the most versatile and successful albums of the band. With the album Guaco Clásico, Volume III (published in 1994) another of the stages of the Venezuelan superband closes.

=== Stage 1995–2005 ===
At this time Guaco opts for a more international sound that is a mixture where jazz, Latin rock and salsa are present: not only in the instrumentation but also in the rhythm of the key. The following albums feature two trumpets, a trombone and a sax and songs that belong directly to Salsa begin to be covered, such as: Mi desengaño, Así son ponco, Remembranzas, Acere Bongo and Fuego en el 23 among others.

Archipiélago (1995) marks the debut of Luis Fernando Borjas as a singer, with songs composed by Jorge Luis Chacín that were highly promoted on the country's radio stations: "No la juzgue" and "Como ella es tan bella". Other well-known songs were "Que cobardía" (sung by Sundín Galué) and "Simón's dream" (voiced by Gustavo Aguado and with the special participation of Simón Díaz). The song "Como sera" (written and sung by J. L. Chacín) was also known.

In 1997 the album Amazonas was published under the musical direction of Juan Carlos Salas, the promotional single was the song composed and sung by Jorge Luis Chacín "Si tú la viera". This single success shows a natural wear and tear of the band who, after 25 years publishing one album a year, let two years go by without publishing. Later in 1999 they recorded an album of versions of the band's hits with the addition of four unreleased songs, including the one composed by José Alfonzo Quiñones and performed by Gustavo Aguado "La turbulencia".

In the year 2000 they resume the publication of another album with unreleased songs called Equilibrio, where the best known song was "Señor Weiss" composed and sung by Jorge Luis Chacín, who after this production leaves the band to dedicate himself to his own projects. Galopando in 2002, constitutes the last album where Nelsón Arrieta participates, who decides to start her career as a soloist. From this production the songs sung by Gustavo Aguado: «El buzo» and «Pa' Colombia» reached a certain media impact.

Guaco, the sound of Venezuela, published in 2005, marks the debut of Ronald Borjas replacing Nelson Arrieta. The band returns to the voice of this singer, the path of success with songs like: "Pídeme" and "Pasan los días". Gustavo Aguado interprets "Entraíto en años" to the rhythm of the accordion, trying once again to penetrate the Colombian market.

=== Stage 2006 to present ===
The album Equus, released in 2006, is mainly known for the song "Confusion" sung by Gustavo Aguado, which became the intro and farewell to the telenovela "Voltea pa' que te enamores" produced by the television channel Venevisión.

In 2010 the group resumes recording activity and begins recording its album Guajiro. The Venezuelan composer José Alfonzo Quiñones, who had already collaborated with several songs on previous albums, wrote the songs "Ella" sung by Gilberto Santa Rosa and "Amor a drip" in the voice of Ronald Borjas. Other collaborations were those of the Venezuelan Jesús Enrique Divine in the song "Bandido" and that of Hiyanú Alcántara in the song "Fruit Forbidden" that presents a rhythm very close to rap. "I want to tell you" sung by Luis Fernando Borjas was the promotional theme.5

After more than 45 years of artistic career, the group released in 2012 the album Sculpture, nominated for two Latin Grammy Awards and which sold 150,000 copies, earning it a triple platinum record. In this work, Guaco brought together the singers and exponents of the salsa genre Rubén Blades, Gilberto Santa Rosa and Luis Enrique. Featured songs from this album were "Dámelo todo", with the collaboration of the Venezuelan singer Claudia Santos) and "Vivo" (which was one of the promotional songs). From this album a promotional tour is made that allows the band to launch the first DVD of the band, which is called Historic Guaco, recorded in the city of Caracas and composed of 16 songs. 6 For this recording they had again Gilberto Santa Rosa and Luis Enrique and the Venezuelans Kiara, Nelson Arrieta and Jorge Luis Chacín. This material was distributed through a newspaper of national circulation.

In November 2013, the singer Elahim David joined Guaco, coinciding with the departure of Ronald Borjas from the band. José Alfonso Quiñones was the one who recommended the singer who, after a live test, remained within the band. Later Guaco incorporated the singer Diego Rojas.

These singers from Caracas made their debut on the album Presente continuo, released in 2014, and in which the artists Fonseca, Víctor Manuelle, the Spanish flamenco singer Enrique Heredia Negri and the Cuban Isaac Delgado were invited.8 About this work Ricardo Portillo, a former member of the group ignited a controversy (through social networks) when he wrote: "The same as always, creativity vanishes", implying that with the repetition of formulas that have been successful, sometimes the results are not achieved expected artistic.

This record work (like the last three) was made as an independent production and was distributed nationally by the EPA hardware store chain.

In 2016 Guaco announces on its social networks the official integration of the new member: Mark Meléndez. Also, won their first Latin Grammy.

The Bidimendional album where he shares with the Simón Bolívar Symphony Orchestra of Venezuela conducted by Gustavo Dudamel, in 2017 won a Latin Grammy Award for "Best Contemporary Tropical Album" reaching more than 70,000 copies sold thanks to an alliance with the cinema chain Cinex and Farmatodo. This production marks the debut of singer Mark Meléndez performing the song "Llenarte de amores", where the best known song was "Lágrimas no más" recorded by Luis Fernando Borjas in 2016, thus being the album's promotional song. Later, a remix with Less & Chris would be released.

In 2017 the documentary Guaco: Semblanza, directed by Alberto Arvelo, was released, the first film production made by the group followed by the concert with the Simón Bolívar Symphony Orchestra of Venezuela, conducted by Gustavo Dudamel.

== Band members ==
- Mario Viloria – Founder, Main Composer, Director, Vocals, Musical Director, Guitar (Retired)
- Alfonso "Pompo" Aguado – Founder (Retired)
- Gustavo Aguado – Founder, Director, and Vocals
- Juan Carlos Salas – Musical Director, Trumpet
- Diego Rojas – Vocals
- Marc Meléndez – Vocals
- Alexis Moreno – Charrasca
- Yonis Flores – Drum (Tambora)
- Vladimir Quintero – Congas
- Julio Rivera – Timbales
- Humberto Casanova – Drums
- Gustavo Molero – Bongo, Bells, and Percussion
- Rafael Greco – Tenor Sax
- Norman Cepeda – Trombone
- Edepson González – Keyboards
- Henry Paul – Bass
- Carmelo Medina – Guitar

== Discography ==
- Navidad Zuliana (Conjunto gaitero los Guacos del Zulia) – 1964–1965
- Maracaibo Cuatricentenario (Conjunto gaitero estudiantil los Guacos del Zulia) 1965–1967
- Festiival Gaitero (Conjunto gaitero estudiantil los Guacos del Zulia) 1966–1967
- El Obrero (Conunto Los Guacos del Zulia) – 1968–1970
- Maracaibo Cuatricentenario – 1969–1972
- Los Guacos – 1970–1971
- Guaco – 1971–1972
- Esta gaita si está en algo – 1972–1973
- Gaita a todo color con los Guaco – 1973–1975
- Guaco 73 – 1973–1974
- No diga que no los ha escuchado ni los ha visto – 1974–1975
- Guaco 75 – 1975–1976
- Guaco 76 – 1976–1977
- Grupo Guaco 77 – 1977–1978
- Criollo y Sabroso (Disco doble) – 1978–1979
- Guaco 79 – 1979–1980
- Guaco 80 – 1980–1982
- Guaco 81 – 1981–1982
- Guaco 82 – 1982–1984
- Guaco 83 – 1983–1984
- Guaco es guaco – 1984
- Guaco 85
- Tercera Etapa – 1986
- Maduro – 1987
- Dejando Huella – 1988
- Betania – 1989
- Atraccion Fatal – 1990
- Guaco 90
- Guaco 91
- Guaco 91 (Japanese version)
- Guaco 92
- Guaco 93
- Triceratops – 1993
- Guaco Clásico I
- Guaco Clásico II
- Guaco Clásico III – Sabroso
- Archipiélago
- Amazonas
- Cómo era y cómo es – 1999
- Guaco es Guaco – 2000 (Compilation album under Universal Masters Collection label)
- Equilibrio – 2001
- Galopando – 2002
- El sonido de Venezuela – 2005
- Equus – 2006
- Guajiro – 2010
- Escultura – 2012
- Guaco Histórico (DVD) – 2014
- Presente continuo – 2014
- Guaco Histórico 2 – 2016
- Bidimensional – 2017
