= Flor De Fuego =

Album by Caramelos de Cianuros

Flor de Fuego

Studio album by Caramelos de Cianuro
- Released: 2006
- Recorded: 2006
- Genre: Latin rock
- Producer: Caramelos de Cianuro

Caramelos de Cianuro chronology
La Historia: Grandes Exitos (2004)	Flor de Fuego (2006)	Caramelos de Cianuro (2010)

Flor de Fuego is the fourth studio album from the Venezuelan Latin rock band Caramelos de Cianuro.

Como Serpiente was released as a single and topped the national charts.

== Members ==
- Asier Cazalís (Vocalist)
- Alfonso Tosta (Drummer)
- Pável Tello (Bassist)
- Miguel González "El Enano" (Guitarist)

== Track listing ==
1. Como Serpiente
2. No Eres Tú
3. Baby Cohete
4. Delineador
5. Chewin Gum
6. Así
7. Guerra Lenta
8. Flor de Fuego
9. Electrobotic
10. Veneno
