= Eduardo Betancourt =

Venezuelan harpist

Eduardo Betancourt (born 1976) is a Venezuelan harpist from Caracas and one of the most recognized interpreters of Arpa llanera. He generally uses Camac Harps in his contemporary and traditional interpretations. He has played as a soloist and as a member of the bands of artists like Huáscar Barradas, Simón Díaz, Ilan Chester, Rafael "Pollo" Brito and Gilberto Santa Rosa. He won the Latin Grammy in 2010 with the Album "Tesoros de la Música Venezolana" and was nominated in 2016 with the album "Pa' Tío Simón" with Rafael "Pollo" Brito. He is sponsored by the French harp luthiers Camac Harps and is a professor at the Harp School. In the past, Eduardo Betancourt also participated in teaching with El Sistema, helping design a method to teach how to play instruments of traditional Venezuelan music.
