= Benavides (singer) =

Venezuelan singer and songwriter

Edmundo Benavides (born July 4, 1985 in Caracas, Venezuela) is a Venezuelan singer and songwriter. He began his artistic career in 2006 under the name Edmundo, and later changed his name to Benavides in 2011. In 2012, he was named the fourth most played artist of the year in Venezuela and in 2013 he became the seventh most played artist in the country. In 2013 he began his international career with his single (music) Mi Ex. He was also nominated for the Lo Nuestro Award as Best New Artist (tropical) of the year.

== Childhood ==
Edmundo David Benavides Porras was born in Caracas, Venezuela. His parents are Edmundo R. Benavides and Carmen Zenaida Porras. He began writing his own music at 8 years old and took his first guitar lessons at 12. He studied music at the Escuela Contemporánea de la Voz and also graduated as a Telecommunications engineer from the Universidad Católica Andrés Bello in 2008.

== Music career ==
=== Edmundo ===
His music career began in 2006 under the name Edmundo when he recorded his first album Mi Mundo. It contains ten songs all composed by Benavides in the style of Latin pop. It was produced by Milena Naranjo and Francisco Domingo. From this album, Benavides began promoting the single "Tan Solo Quiero". Afterwards, he promoted the single Te Haré Crecer in Venezuela. In mid-2010, Benavides promoted in Colombia the song "Un Medio". In Colombia his stage name was changed from Edmundo to Benavides.

=== Benavides ===
In 2011, Benavides began recording his second album Aquí Estoy. It contains ten songs all composed by the artist in the style of Tropical music. By mid-2011, he began promoting the single "Amor Imposible", produced by Daniel & Yein. In 2012, he promoted the single "Aquí Estoy", produced by Juan Miguel Dell'Orco and Daniel Espinoza. It reached first place in the Venezuelan musical charts. In June 2012, he released a version of his album Aquí Estoy through an alliance with El Nacional (Caracas) throughout Venezuela. In October of the same year, the album was released in stores and digital platforms.

Benavides also promoted the single "Mi Ex", produced by Daniel Baron, in 2012. This became his most successful song up to this point. This single became the sixth most played song of 2012 in Venezuela, making Benavides the fourth most played artist of the year in Venezuela. Its video reached the top of the list of HTV's Hot Ranking.

In 2013, Benavides released his single Dámelo Todo, produced by Daniel Baron, which stays at the top of the Venezuela charts for various consecutive weeks. Its video reached the top of Htv's Hot Ranking. He was nominated as Best Tropical Video of the Year for "Mi Ex" and Best Tropical Album for Aquí Estoy at the Pepsi Music Awards.

At the end of 2013, Benavides released his new single "Tu Rompecabezas", produced by Daniel Baron. Benavides ended 2013 as Top 10 of the most played artists of 2013 in Venezuela. In 2014, "Tu Rompecabezas" reached the Top 5 of the Venezuelan music charts. Benavides also begins his year as part of the "2014 Movistar Tour," traveling across Venezuela with his musical show.

In 2013, Benavides also debuted his Dámelo Todo Show in which he showcases his musical hits accompanied with choreographic dance and live music. This show was presented in several cities in Venezuela.

=== International career ===
In 2013, Benavides released his promotional single Mi Ex in the United States which quickly reaches the Top 10 of Billboard's Tropical Latin charts. The songs remains various weeks at the top of the charts, making Mi Expart of the Top 15 most played songs of the year. Benavides is also nominated to Premio Lo Nuestro as Best New Artist (Tropical) of the year.

== Discography ==
=== Mi Mundo (Edmundo) ===
1. Tan Solo Quiero
2. Un Medio
3. Te Haré Crecer
4. Volaré
5. En Una Estrella
6. Contigo
7. Te Admiro
8. Tienes Que Cambiar
9. Enséñame a Vivir
10. Mi Vida Eres Tu

=== Aquí Estoy (Benavides) ===
1. Aquí Estoy (versión tropical)
2. Mi Ex
3. Tu Príncipe Azul
4. Damelo Todo
5. Dime Que Hacer
6. Tu Rompecabezas
7. Vivir Sin Ti
8. Pecadora
9. Quiero Darte
10. Amor Impossible
11. Aqui Estoy (versión pop)

=== Videos ===
1. Aquí Estoy on YouTube
2. Mi Ex on YouTube
3. Dámelo Todo on YouTube
4. Tu Rompecabezas on YouTube
