= Caramelos de Cianuro =

Venezuelan rock band

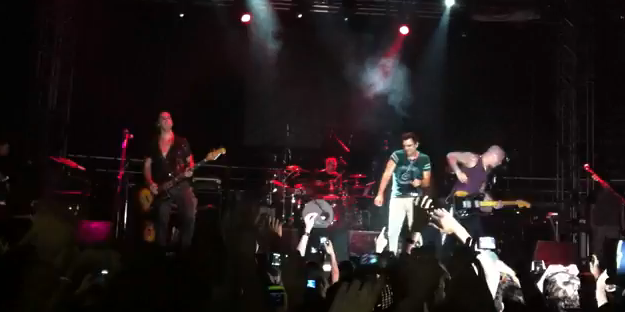

Background information
- Origin: Venezuela
- Genres: Latin rock, punk rock, alternative rock
- Years active: 1991–present
- Label: Latin World Entertainment
- Members: Asier Cazalis; Pável Tello
- Past members: Pablo Martínez; Luis Golding; Alfonso Tosta; Miguel González "El Enano"; Darío Adames
- Website: Caramelos de Cianuro

Caramelos de Cianuro (Cyanide Caramels in Spanish) is an alternative rock band from Venezuela formed in 1991.

== Career ==
The band was founded by vocalist and bassist Asier Cazalis, drummer Pablo Martínez and guitar players Luis Golding and Miguel Ángel "El Enano" González.

They recorded their first songs, "Nadando a Través De la Galaxia" (Swimming Across the Galaxy) and "Tu Mamá Te Va a Pegar" (Your mom is going to hit you), in 1992.

A year later, the group signed up with CNR and released an EP called Las Paticas de la Abuela, followed by the band's first album, Cuentos Para Adultos, in 1994. Performing a mixture of Latin Punk and alternative rock, Caramelos de Cianuro returned in 1996 with Harakiri City, released by Polygram. Two years later, original drummer Pablo Martínez was replaced by Alfonso Tosta, and the group went on tour with Colombian band Aterciopelados. In 2000 they released their album Miss Mujerzuela, which achieved platinum status in Venezuela in 2001.

In 2002, Caramelos de Cianuro released their album called Frisbee, which featured "El Último Polvo". This song's video got into MTV Latin America's Top Ten. In 2005, Luis Golding left the band and Pável Tello joined the band's line up shortly afterward. In 2006 they released their album, Flor De Fuego, with "Como Serpiente" promoted as the lead off single. In August 2008, Alfonso Tosta left the band and was replaced by Darío Adames. In 2010 the group released the album Caramelos de Cianuro, which gave the band multiple accolades thanks to the hit single "La Casa".

On March 22, 2012, their manager and friend of 10 years, Libero Iaizzo, was kidnapped in Caracas, Venezuela while Caramelos de Cianuro were in Mexico preparing for a concert. Though the ransom demand was met, Iaizzo was killed the next day with a shot to the head. That year's Pepsi Music Awards ceremony, at which Caramelos de Cianuro were named Refreshing Band and Rock Artist of the Year, included a tribute to Iaizzo. However, remarks involving his death and other violence in Venezuela were censored from Venevisión's television broadcast of the event. The band has since expressed both pain and concern regarding the steadily rising crime rates in Venezuela.

In 2015, the band released the album 8 with more of a soft rock and post punk sound, featuring "Secreto" as the first single supported by a music video. The album got the band multiple 17th Annual Latin Grammy Awards nominations, including "Best Pop/Rock Album" and "Best Rock Song".

Later in 2018 and after a busy touring schedule, the group released Live From Paris, a double album recorded during their concert at the French capital. During the following years, the band announced the departure of founding member and guitarist Miguel González "El Enano", along with drummer Dario Adames, transforming Caramelos de Cianuro into a two-piece creative act led by Asier Cazalis and Pável Tello, accompanied by a live band when touring.

In 2021, the rock duo announced the release of their new album, Control, recorded between Buenos Aires and Caracas, and produced by Juan Blas Caballero. The album was released in May and was supported by music videos and a world tour.

== Members ==
- Asier Cazalis - lead vocals
- Pável Tello "El Ruso" - bass, guitar, programming

=== Former members ===
- Pablo Martínez - drums (1991–1998)
- Luis Golding - bass (1991–2005)
- Miguel González "El Enano" - guitar (1991–2019)
- Alfonso Tosta - drums (1998–2007)
- Dario Adames - drums (2008 - 2019)

== Discography ==
- Las Paticas de la Abuela (EP) (1993, CNR)
- Cuentos para adultos (1993, CNR)
- Harakiri City (1996, Polygram)
- Miss Mujerzuela (2000, Latin World)
- Frisbee (2002, Latin World)
- Flor De Fuego (2006, Pepsi Music)
- En Vivo (2009, Pepsi Music)
- Caramelos de Cianuro (2010, Pepsi Music)
- 8 (2015, Pepsi Music)
- Live From Paris (2018)
- Control (2021)

== See also ==
- Music of Venezuela
- Rock en Español
