= Anaïs Napoleón =

French-Spanish photographer

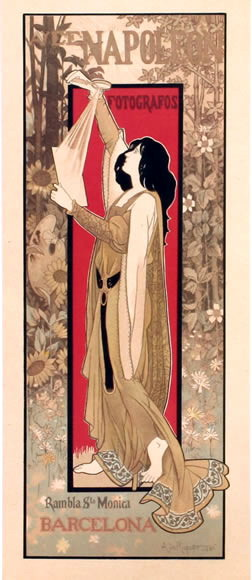
A poster made for their business in 1895 by Alexandre de Riquer

Anaïs Napoleón (Anne Tiffon Cassan; 1827 or 1831 in Narbonne, France – 1912 or 1916) was a French-Spanish photographer. She was one of the first women who made daguerreotypes in Spain. She was also a specialist in making business cards that included photographs. Napoleon was always very interested in learning about photographic advances and applied them to her work. Some evidence suggests that she was the only woman working with moving images.

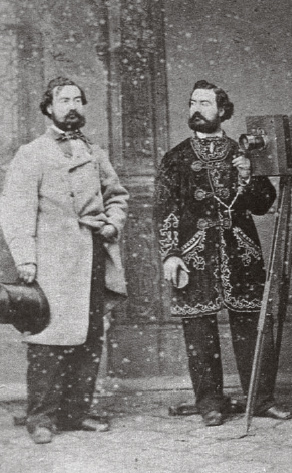
"Fernando" Napoleon in double self-portrait

She moved with her parents, Napoleon Tiffon (a "pedicure artist") and Marie Casan, to Barcelona in 1846, where they settled using the name "Napoleón". She married Antonio Fernández Soriano on 24 December 1850. In 1853, they settled into a small photography shop on the second floor of the boulevard in front of Santa Monica parish church. Anaïs called her husband Fernando because he did not like the name Fernandez. The business was named "Anais i Fernando", later renamed "los hermanos Napoleón". They specialized in portraits. The new business name was from Anaïs Napoleón's last name and not her husband's which was Soriano.

There is evidence of their activity in the La Rambla neighborhood from a notice published on July 31, 1853 in Correo de Barcelona. After acquiring the Lumière cinématographe, they opened a film theater on La Rambla de Santa Mónica and another on Avenida del Parelelo. They abandoned cinematography in 1908, but their photography studio was passed to their children, and after being run by three generations of the family, eventually closed in 1968. Anaïs Napoleón died in 1912. She is the founder of the Napoleón dynasty of photographers.

== Gallery ==
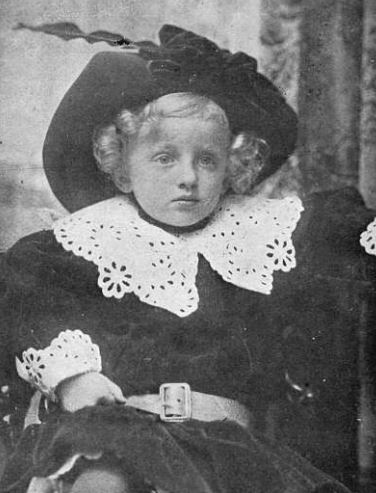
Son of Manuel de Montoliu (1908)

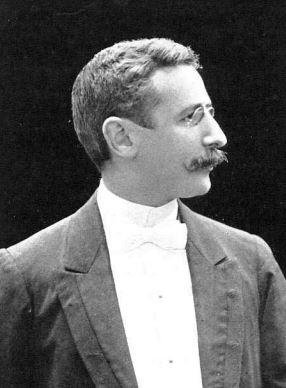
Francesc Carreras i Candi (1903)

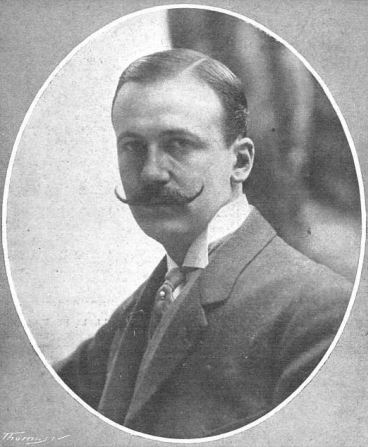
Joan Maria Guasch (1909)

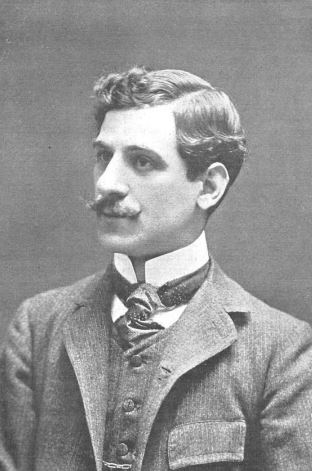
José León Pagano (1904)

== Bibliography ==
- Fontanella, L. (1981). La historia de la Fotografía en España desde sus orígenes hasta 1900. Madrid: Ediciones El Viso. p. 45. ISBN 84-86022-00-2. (in Spanish)
- López Mondéjar, Publio (1999). Historia de la fotografía en España (4th edition). Barcelona: Lunwerg editores. p. 65. ISBN 8477826609. (in Spanish)
- López Mondéjar, Publio (2000). 150 Years of Photography in Spain. Lunwerg. ISBN 978-84-7782-678-1.
