= Anzi =

Anzi may refer to:

- Anzi, Basilicata, Italy
- Anzi, Morocco
- Pan Anzi (born 1977), Chinese film director
- Martino Anzi (1812–1883), Italian priest, ethnologist, historian and botanist
- Stefano Anzi (born 1949), retired Italian alpine skier
