= ANSI character set =

ANSI character set has no well-defined meaning and has been used to refer to the following, among other things:

== Character sets ==
- ASCII, a character set with 128 characters
- Extended ASCII, a character set with 256 characters
- ANSEL, the American National Standard for Extended Latin Alphabet Coded Character Set
- ISO-8859, a collection of 8-bit character sets compatible with ASCII
- The C (programming language) § Character set (portable character set) defined by ANSI C

== Other uses ==
- Windows code pages, a collection of 8-bit character sets compatible with ASCII but incompatible with each other, especially those code pages that are partly compatible with ISO-8859, most commonly Windows Latin 1
  - Windows-1252 is referred to as "ANSI" especially often
- Code page 437, the character set of the original IBM PC (especially in the context of ANSI art which is used as graphics especially in BBS and made as demoscene products)
