= Anaís Vivas =

Venezuelan singer (born 1989)

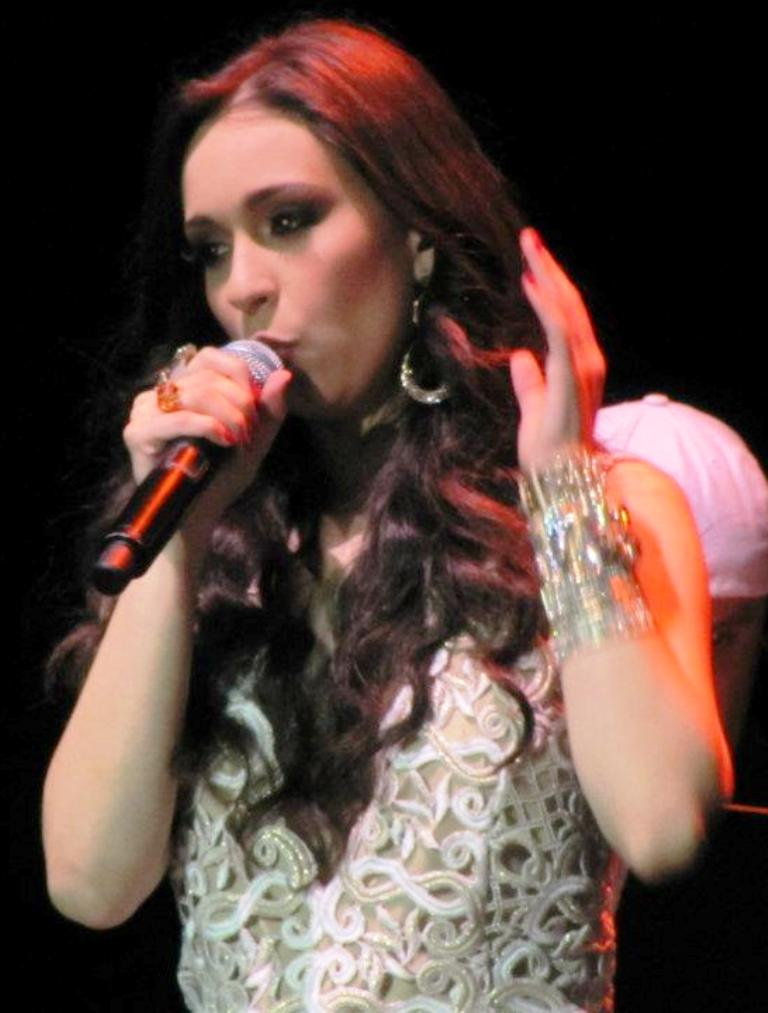
- Born: 25 August 1989 (age 37); Charlottesville, Virginia, U.S.
- Other name: Anaís Vivas Álvarez
- Education: Frost School of Music
- Occupations: Soprano singer Musical career
- Genres: Latin ballad, Latin pop
- Label: Independent
- Years active: 2011–present
- Spouse: Simón Rivas (m. 2020)
- Children: 1
- Parent(s): Virgilio Vivas; Ana Álvarez
- Awards: HTV Heat Awards (2015); Pepsi Venezuela Music Awards (2013, 2014)
- Website: www.anaisvivas.com

Anaís Vivas (born 25 August 1989) is a Venezuelan-American singer. She had remarkable success with her debut album Ser, which placed her songs "Muero por ti" and "Por el resto de mi vida" in the Record Report music chart in 2011 and obtaining international recognition with an HTV Heat Award for Best Female Artist.

== Biography ==
She was born in Charlottesville, Virginia. She is the eldest of two daughters of Venezuelan parents Virgilio Edmundo Vivas (1962) and Ana Isabel Álvarez (1961). Her sister is Ana Karina (1993). Before her first birthday, she moved to Caracas. During her childhood she studied music both in Caracas and Miami. In adolescence she studied at the Manuel Alberto López National Conservatory of Music in Caracas. In addition to preparing for singing, she ventured into dance (flamenco, tap, and jazz) and acting. Her debut in musical theater was with the role of Gretl von Trapp in The Sound of Music. At the age of 13 she made her debut as a soloist in performing the "Habanera" from the opera Carmen.

She completed her studies at the University of Miami's Frost School of Music, where she obtained a scholarship and earned a degree in Music Business and Entertainment Industries, with a mention in lyrical singing, specializing in musical theater. At the same time she was part of the Frost Chorale's soprano section, with whom she toured Florida and Spain.

=== Personal life ===
On December 16, 2015, she began a relationship with singer Simón Eduardo Ruiz (1986), originally from Maracaibo. On September 2, 2020, she announced their engagement. They married in Miami in December of that year. On August 17, 2022, she revealed her pregnancy, and on October 26, Camila Isabel was born.

== Musical career ==
=== 2011–2013: Debut album Ser ===
In September 2011 Vivas premiered "Muero por ti" on Venezuelan radio, her first promotional single, a pop ballad with melodies and nuances of lyrical singing. The single reached the top 10 on the National Record Report, making her one of the most-voted singers of the year. The music video, directed by Diego Osorio, was released weeks later and managed to enter the rotation of several music video channels.

In November 2011, Vivas premiered her first album named Ser, featuring the production of Juan Carlos Pérez Soto. Her second promotional single, entitled "Un mundo sin nunca", was written by the Puerto Rican singer Luis Fonsi. At the end of that year, she collaborated on the aguinaldo "Niño lindo" with Venezuelan singer-songwriter Rafael "Pollo" Brito.

That year she opened concerts in Caracas for singer Laura Pausini and the group Il Volo. In December 2012 she released the single "Diciembre otra vez" as part of a campaign for UNICEF, and in 2013 she released the video of her single "Ser", for which she had the participation of her fans, who shared their videos through her Facebook page.

She won in the Best Female Artist category at the Pepsi Venezuela Music Awards ceremony that year, and released the video for the song "Por el resto de mi vida".

=== 2014–present ===
In 2014 Vivas again managed to win in the category of Best Female Artist at the Pepsi Music Awards.

In 2015 she recorded the single "Corazón Oculto", the main theme of the Venezuelan film Hasta Que La Muerte Nos Separe, directed by Abraham Pulido. Months later, she won the HTV Heat Award for Best Female Artist, sharing the category with the singers Shakira, Gloria Trevi, Adriana Lucía, Duina del Mar, and Farina. This award was the first international recognition achieved in her career.

As of 2017, Vivas is working on the production of her second album with renowned music producer Humberto Gatica.

== Discography ==
=== Studio albums ===
- 2011: Ser

=== Singles ===
- "Muero por ti"
- "Un mundo sin jamás"
- "Nada mejor que tú"
- "Ser"
- "Por el resto de mi vida"

=== Other songs ===
- "Niño lindo" (with Rafael "Pollo" Brito)
- "Diciembre otra vez"
- "Corazón oculto"
- "Duendecillos en la Cama" (with Víctor Muñoz)
