= Anaïs Perrière-Pilte =

French composer (1809–1878)

Comtesse Anaïs Perrière-Pilte (Anais Marcelli; born Anne Laure Joséphine Hure; 1809 – December 1878) was a French composer noted for theatrical works who often used the pseudonym "Anais Marcelli." She usually wrote her own libretti, and had a theatre built in her home to produce opera. She died in Paris.

== Works ==
Selected works include:

- Jaloux de soi 1873 operetta
- Le sorcier 1866 operetta
- Le talon d'Achille 1875 operetta
- Les vacances de l'Amour 1867 opéra comique
