= Bouhet =

- Commune
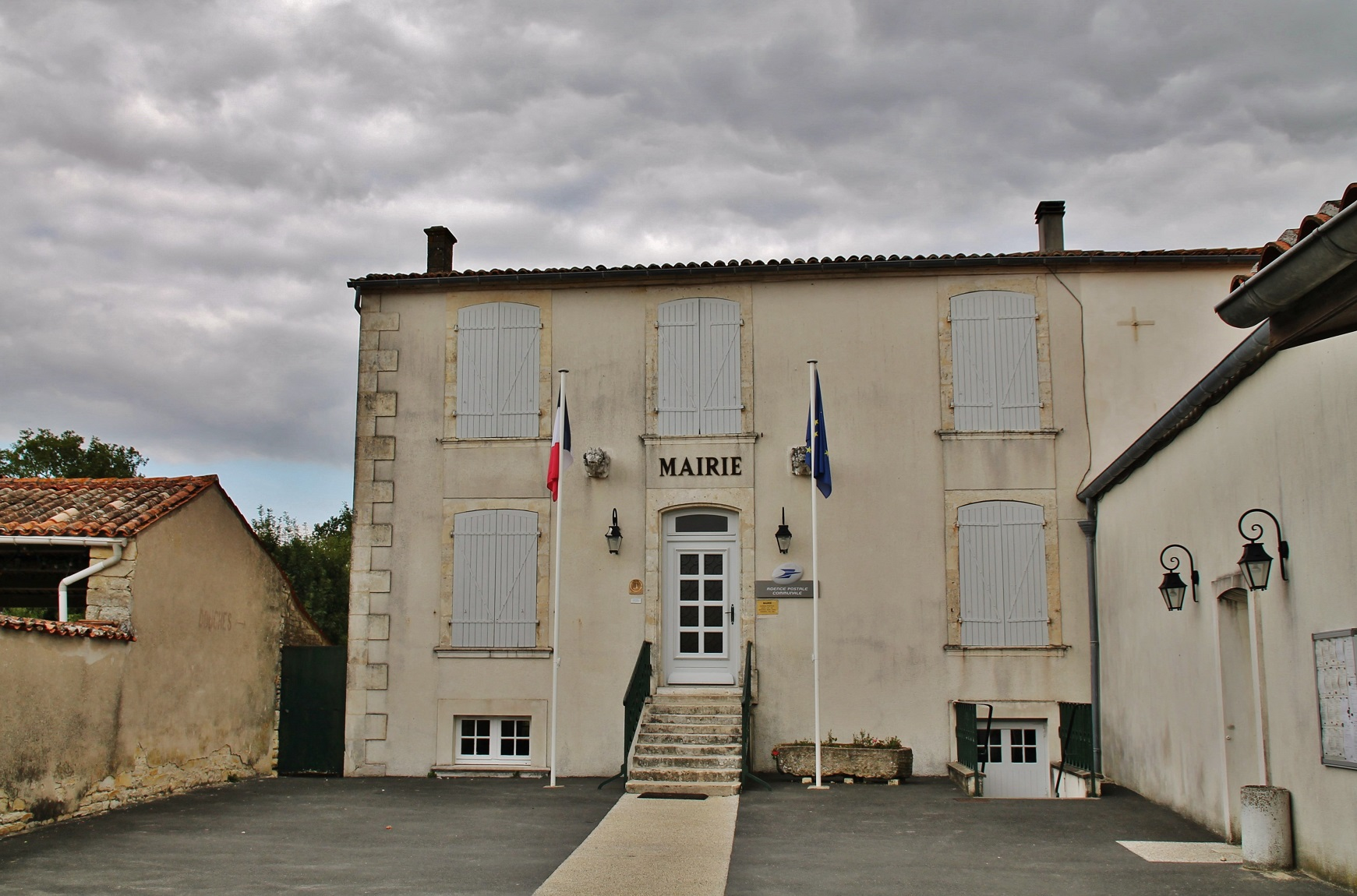
- The town hall in Bouhet
- Location of Bouhet
- Location within France Location within Nouvelle-Aquitaine
- Coordinates: 46°09′59″N 0°51′25″W
- Country: France
- Region: Nouvelle-Aquitaine
- Department: Charente-Maritime
- Arrondissement: Rochefort
- Canton: La Jarrie

Government
  - Mayor (2020–2026): Christophe Rault
- Area^{1}: 15.2 km^{2} (5.9 sq mi)
- Elevation: 22 m (72 ft)
- Highest elevation: 36 m (118 ft)
- Lowest elevation: 6 m (20 ft)
- Population (2023): 903
  - Density: 59.4/km^{2} (154/sq mi)
- Time zone: UTC+01:00 (CET)
  - Summer (DST): UTC+02:00 (CEST)
- INSEE/Postal code: 17057 /17540
- ^{1} French Land Register data, which excludes lakes, ponds, glaciers > 1 km^{2} (0.386 sq mi or 247 acres) and river estuaries.

Bouhet (French pronunciation: [bu.ɛ]) is a commune in the Charente-Maritime department in the Nouvelle-Aquitaine region in southwestern France.

== Population ==
Historical population
| Year | Pop. | ±% p.a. |
|---|---|---|
| 1968 | 303 | — |
| 1975 | 277 | −1.27% |
| 1982 | 377 | +4.50% |
| 1990 | 390 | +0.42% |
| 1999 | 410 | +0.56% |
| 2007 | 690 | +6.72% |
| 2012 | 856 | +4.41% |
| 2017 | 903 | +1.07% |
| 2023 | 903 | +0.00% |
Source: INSEE

== See also ==
- Communes of the Charente-Maritime department
