= Pepsi Venezuela Music Awards =

Music honors

- Awarded for: Venezuelan music
- Sponsored by: Pepsi-Cola Venezuela
- Date: 29 March 2012
- Location: Caracas, Venezuela
- Website: premiospepsimusic.com

The Pepsi Venezuela Music Awards (Spanish: Premios Pepsi Music Venezuela; PPM) are honors for the best music in Venezuela in various genres.

Its first edition took place on 29 March 2012 in Caracas and was broadcast on Venevisión. Since its second edition in 2013, it has been broadcast by Televen.

== History ==
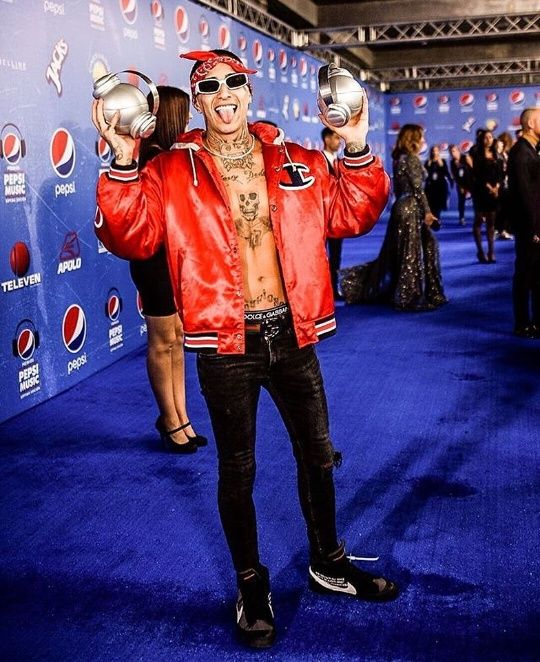
Neutro Shorty at the 2019 Pepsi Venezuela Music Awards

The Pepsi Music Awards were created to recognize Venezuela's musical talent in all its genres, connecting musicians among themselves, with their fans, and with the general public.

Each year, the process begins in October through nominations on the Pepsi Venezuela website. After that, nominations close and voting begins with a jury chosen by the Pepsi Music Academy. This culminates with ceremonies that take place in September of the following year.

The awards have more than 60 categories in which bands or artists who have worked actively from 1 January to 15 December can be nominated.

Each winning artist in a category receives a personalized statuette with their name and the name of the category. The awards are delivered through two galas – one private (not televised) and another broadcast nationwide.

== Pepsi Music Academy ==
The awards' governing body is the Pepsi Music Academy, comprising connoisseurs of Venezuela's music industry, independent of Pepsi-Cola Venezuela. It is responsible for the dissemination and design of the categories and regulations of each edition of the awards, ensuring compliance for the selection of the five nominees for each category, and later of the winners.

It is made up of two types of members differentiated by their participation in the awards' phases: Advisory Members – personalities with extensive experience and commitment to the country's music industry – and Specialist Members – knowledgeable opinion leaders of the music industry with specific strengths in one or more musical genres.

== General categories ==
- Artist of the Year
- Album of the Year
- Song of the Year
- Refreshing Artist
- Video of the Year
- Debut Artist
- Video Director
- Music Producer
- Songwriter of the Year
- Collaboration of the Year
- Female Artist of the Year

== Specific categories ==
- Classical Artist
- Electronic Artist of the Year
- Electronic Album of the Year
- Electronic Song of the Year
- Electronic Video of the Year
- Gaita Artist of the Year
- Gaita Album of the Year
- Gaita Song of the Year
- Hip Hop Artist of the Year
- Hip Hop Video of the Year
- Hip Hop Album of the Year
- Hip Hop Song of the Year
- Hip Hop DJ of the Year
- Jazz/Blues Artist of the Year
- Jazz/Blues Album of the Year
- Jazz/Blues Composer of the Year
- Traditional Music Instrumental Artist of the Year
- Traditional Music Instrumental Album of the Year
- Traditional Music Instrumental Composer of the Year
- Traditional Music Vocal Artist of the Year
- Traditional Music Vocal Album of the Year
- Traditional Music Vocal Song of the Year
- Pop Artist of the Year
- Pop Video of the Year
- Pop Album of the Year
- Pop Song of the Year
- Reggae/Ska Artist of the Year
- Reggae/Ska Video of the Year
- Reggae/Ska Album of the Year
- Reggae/Ska Song of the Year
- Rock Artist of the Year
- Rock Video of the Year
- Rock Album of the Year
- Rock Song of the Year
- Salsa Artist of the Year
- Salsa Song of the Year
- Salsa Album of the Year
- Salsa Video of the Year
- Tropical Artist of the Year
- Tropical Video of the Year
- Tropical Song of the Year
- Tropical Album of the Year
- Urban Artist of the Year
- Urban Video of the Year
- Urban Album of the Year
- Urban Song of the Year
- Trap Artist of the Year
- Trap Album of the Year
- Trap Video of the Year
- Trap Song of the Year
- Digital Artist of the Year

== Editions ==
=== Summary ===
Year	Edition	Location	Ceremony date	Broadcaster	Presenter(s)	Nominations
2012	1st	Quinta Esmeralda, Caracas	29 March 2012	Venevisión	Ramón Castro and Eglantina Zingg	35
2013	2nd	Eurobuilding Hotel, Caracas	28 May 2013	Televen	Erika de la Vega and Ramón Castro	38
2014	3rd	Eurobuilding Hotel, Caracas	24 September 2014	E! – Televen	Ramón Castro	39
2015	4th	Eurobuilding Hotel, Caracas	7 September 2015	Televen	Ramón Castro and Daniela Kosán	48
2017	5th	Tamanaco City Commercial Center	16 February 2017	Televen	Ramón Castro and Daniela Kosán	56
2018	6th	Tamanaco City Commercial Center	27 September 2018	Televen	Nacho	68

=== 2012 ===
The first edition of the awards took place on 28 March 2012 at the Quinta Esmeralda in Caracas and was broadcast by Venevisión. The presenters were Ramón Castro and Eglantina Zingg. The main winners of the night were Chino & Nacho. The main theme was "No A La Violencia".

This was the only edition to be shown by Venevisión, due to the network's censorship of a large part of the awards, drawing criticism from the artists present.

The following winners were presented awards on the televised broadcast:

- Artist of the Year: Chino & Nacho
- Album of the Year: Supremo (Chino & Nacho)
- Song of the Year: "El poeta" (Chino & Nacho)
- Refreshing Band: Caramelos de Cianuro
- Video of the Year: "La Casa" (Caramelos de Cianuro)
- Tropical Video of the Year: "Quiero Decirte" (Guaco)
- Debut Artist of the Year: Lasso
- Musical Producer: Oscarcito
- Rock Artist of the Year: Caramelos de Cianuro
- Tropical Artist of the Year: Grupo Treo
- Pop Artist of the Year: Franco De Vita
- Reggae Artist of the Year: Rawayana
- Hip Hop Artist of the Year: Cuarto Poder
- Ska Artist of the Year: Desorden Público
- Traditional Music Artist of the Year: Huáscar Barradas

=== 2013 ===
The second edition of the awards ceremony took place on 28 May 2013. It was held at the Eurobuilding Hotel in Caracas, transmitted by Televen on 29 May, and presented by Erika de la Vega and Ramón Castro.

The event had been scheduled for 12 March, with the broadcast the following day, but it had to be postponed after the death of President Hugo Chávez. Also, this year the sponsor began to produce Pepsi Streams, hour-long programs hosted by Alex Goncalves that were part of the national talent support platform, with presentations and interviews with the nominees.

The following winners were presented awards on the televised broadcast:

- Artist of the Year: Guaco
- Album of the Year: Guaco
- Song of the Year: Guaco
- Tropical Video of the Year: Guaco
- Refreshing Band: Servando & Florentino
- Video of the Year: Chino & Nacho
- Debut Artist of the Year: HolySexyBastards
- Musical Producer: Carlos Imperatori, Rudy Pagliuca, and Lasca
- Rock Artist of the Year: Caramelos de Cianuro
- Tropical Artist of the Year: Guaco
- Pop Artist of the Year: Lasso
- Reggae Artist of the Year: Desorden Público
- Ska Artist of the Year: Desorden Público
- Traditional Music Artist of the Year: Huáscar Barradas

=== 2014 ===
The third edition was held on 24 September 2014 at the Eurobuilding Hotel in Caracas. The gala was hosted by Ramón Castro. The "Blue Carpet" was streamed by E!, and the gala by Televen the next day.

Voting was opened on 27 July, and closed on 24 August. The event included a tribute to Simón Díaz.

The following winners were presented awards on the televised broadcast:

- Venezuelan Vocal Roots Music: C4 Trio and Rafael Brito
- Reggae Artist of the Year: Rawayana
- Salsa Artist: Oscar D'León
- Ska Artist: Desorden Público
- Tropical Artist: Guaco
- Artist Collaboration of the year: C4 Trio and Rafael Brito
- Hip Hop Artist: Cuarto Poder
- Best Rock Artist: La Vida Bohème
- Best Urban Artist: Oscarcito
- Best Pop Artist: Los Amigos Invisibles
- Composer of the Year: Simón Díaz
- Female Artist: Anaís Vivas
- Debut Artist of the Year: Lida Briceño
- Refreshing Artist: Benavides
- Artist of the Year: C4 Trío and Rafael Brito

=== 2015 ===
The fourth edition was carried out with the non-televised ceremony on 7 September 2015, while the "Blue Carpet" and televised gala were held on 9 September at the Eurobuilding Hotel in Caracas. The gala was hosted by Ramón Castro and Daniela Kosán, and broadcast by Televen two days later, on 11 September.

This year four new awards were included: Classical, World, Llanera, and Film Theme. Voting began on 15 July and ended on 24 August.

The following winners were presented awards on the televised broadcast:

- Best Venezuelan Traditional Music: Movida Acústica Urbana
- Best Tropical Fusion Artist: Caibo
- Best Gaita Artist: Gran Coquivacoa
- Best Hip Hop Artist: Apache
- Best Rock Artist: Charliepapa
- Debut Artist: La Pagana Trinidad
- Pop Artist of the Year: Laura Guevara
- Ska Artist: Desorden Público
- Salsa Artist: Nelson Arrieta
- Urban Artist of the Year: Sixto Rein
- Reggae Artist of the Year: Rastamaika
- Female Artist: Laura Guevara
- Best Llanera Artist: Rummy Olivo
- Theme of the Year: "Tú me quemas", Chino & Nacho feat. Los Cadillac's
- Refreshing Artist: Sixto Rein
- Artist of the Year: Edward Ramírez

=== 2017 ===
The fifth edition was held on 16 February 2017 at the Terrace of the Tamanaco City Commercial Center (CCCT) in Caracas. The televised gala was hosted by Daniela Kosán and Ramón Castro. The "Blue Carpet" and the final gala were broadcast a day later by Televen.

Voting was opened on 5 October 2016, and closed on 16 November. The non-televised gala was held on 15 February 2017 at the Polar Business Center Auditorium and hosted by La Vero Gómez and Manuel Silva.

This edition had originally been planned for late 2016, but was postponed until February 2017, and all works published in 2015 were eligible. "The fifth edition was about to fail, but a great effort was made," said the president of the Pepsi Music Academy, John Fabio Bermúdez. It was planned that in September, when it would be customary to present the statuettes, works from 2016 would be awarded.

The following winners were presented awards on the televised broadcast:

- Artist of the Year: Chino & Nacho
- Female Artist of the year: Anaís Vivas
- Tropical Fusion Artist of the Year: Chino & Nacho
- Gaita Artist of the Year: UDG Universidad de la Gaita
- Hip Hop Artist of the Year: Apache
- Llanera Artist of the Year: Jorge Guerrero
- Pop Artist of the Year: Víctor Muñoz
- Refreshing Artist of the Year: La Melodía Perfecta
- Reggae Artist of the Year: Ababajah
- Debut Artist of the Year: La Melodía Perfecta
- Rock Artist of the Year: Caramelos de Cianuro
- Salsa Artist of the Year: Nelson Arrieta
- Ska Artist of the Year: Desorden Público
- Venezuelan Traditional Music Artist of the Year: Rafael Brito
- Urban Artist of the Year: Sixto Rein
- Theme of the Year: "Me voy enamorando", Chino & Nacho feat. Farruko

=== 2018 ===
For the sixth edition of the gala, fans will be able to choose their favorite artists in more than 60 categories divided into 20 musical genres. Voting began on 17 July 2018. The event will be held on 27 September in the parking lot of the Tamanaco City Commercial Center (CCCT).

This edition introduced the genre of trap, due to the strength with which the musical movement has been developing in recent years. Likewise, the most outstanding influencers will be awarded in the Digital Artist category. John Fabio Bermúdez, president of the Pepsi Music Academy, highlighted the importance of these awards for the country's music industry. "There are more than 400 artists recognized with these awards, which undoubtedly have been taken into account by them as a great support."

The following winners were presented awards on the televised broadcast:

- Artist of the Year: La Melodia Perfecta
- Female Artist of the year: Corina Smith
- Tropical Fusion Artist of the Year: Guaco
- Gaita Artist of the Year:
- Hip Hop Artist of the Year: Akapellah
- Llanera Artist of the Year: Annaé Torrealba
- Pop Artist of the Year: Corina Smith
- Refreshing Artist of the Year: Micro TDH
- Reggae Artist of the Year: Agua Mala
- Debut Artist of the Year: Omar Koonze
- Rock Artist of the Year: Caramelos de Cianuro
- Salsa Artist of the Year: Jonathan Moly
- Ska Artist of the Year: Desorden Público
- Venezuelan Traditional Music Artist of the Year: Edward Ramirez and Rafa Pino
- Urban Artist of the Year: La Melodia Perfecta
- Theme of the Year: Rawayana
