= Anais Catala =

French model of Jewish faith

- Born: Paris, France
- Modeling information
- Height: 5 ft 8 in (1.73 m)
- Hair color: Dark Brown
- Eye color: Blue

Anais Catala is a half Iraqi and half French model of 3 thirds of Jewish faith.

Daughter of an Iraqi mother and French father, she was a delegate in Miss Earth 2007 competing as Miss Iraq and held the title for Miss Iraq 2007 being only 20 years old.

She resides in Paris, France. Anais is fluent in French, English and German.
