= Anissa Abi-Dargham =

American psychiatrist

Anissa Abi-Dargham, is an American psychiatrist and researcher. She is a psychiatry professor and vice-chair of research at Stony Brook University and professor emerita at the Columbia University College of Physicians and Surgeons.

She was previously the Chief of the Division of Translational Imaging in the Psychiatry Department at Columbia. She also served as Director of Clinical and Imaging Research in the Lieber Center for Schizophrenia Research, and Director of the Silvio O. Conte Center for the study of "Dopamine Dysfunction in Schizophrenia", both based at the New York State Psychiatric Institute.

== Education ==
She was born and raised in Beirut, Lebanon, where pursued her medical education at Saint Joseph's University before relocating to the United States in 1985. She completed her residency at the University of Tennessee, In Memphis, which was followed by a research fellowship at the National Institute of Mental Health. In 1992, Abi-Dargham completed her Post-Doctoral Fellow at Yale University School of Medicine.

== Research ==
Abi-Dargham has used molecular imaging techniques, such as single photon emission computed tomography (SPECT) and positron emission tomography (PET), to study the pathophysiology of schizophrenia, schizophrenia-related spectrum disorders, and addiction. With her collaborators, Abi-Dargham has done PET and fMRI studies on dopamine receptor density and network connectivity in both healthy individuals and patients with schizophrenia.. Her work has resulted in seminal publications describing the complex alterations of dopamine transmission in schizophrenia and their relationship to clinical symptoms, cognition and response to treatment, as well as their interrelatedness to glutamate dysfunction in schizophrenia.

These studies showed increased striatal dopamine release in schizophrenia, which has become one of the most established findings of schizophrenia research and is now being tested as a biomarker for risk to develop schizophrenia in prodromal patients.

The work with cortical D1 receptor has provided added rationale for testing D1 agonists in schizophrenia. A new direction for work in her imaging group now is dual diagnosis patients with comorbid schizophrenia and cannabis abuse. She and her team found that most drug addictions blunt dopamine release during the chronic phase of drug dependence, which results in poor outcomes. In a popular interview, she explained, "The bottom line is that long-term, heavy cannabis use may impair the dopaminergic system, which could have a variety of negative effects on learning and behavior." Ultimately this work is relevant to developing biomarkers and more focused treatment interventions for these disorders.

== Awards and honors ==
Abi-Dargham has received numerous awards, and published over 165 articles in major scientific journals. She is the deputy editor of imaging for both neuropsychopharmacology and biological psychiatry, President of the American College of Neuropsychopharmacology, and former president of the Brain Imaging Council for the Society of Nuclear Medicine. Additionally, she has a large portfolio of federal, charitable and industry-funded studies.

In 2016, she was elected to membership in the National Academy of Medicine.
