= Anissa Mack =

American artist

Anissa Mack (born 1970) is an American contemporary artist. Mack is a graduate of Wesleyan University in Middletown. Mack is known for her sculptural and mixed media works that take state fairs as inspiration. Her work is included in the collections of the Whitney Museum of American Art and the International Center of Photography. Mack's "Junk Kaleidoscope" was installed at the Aldrich Contemporary Art Museum from October 2017 to April 2018.
