= Anissa Helou =

Lebanese-born British chef, teacher, and author

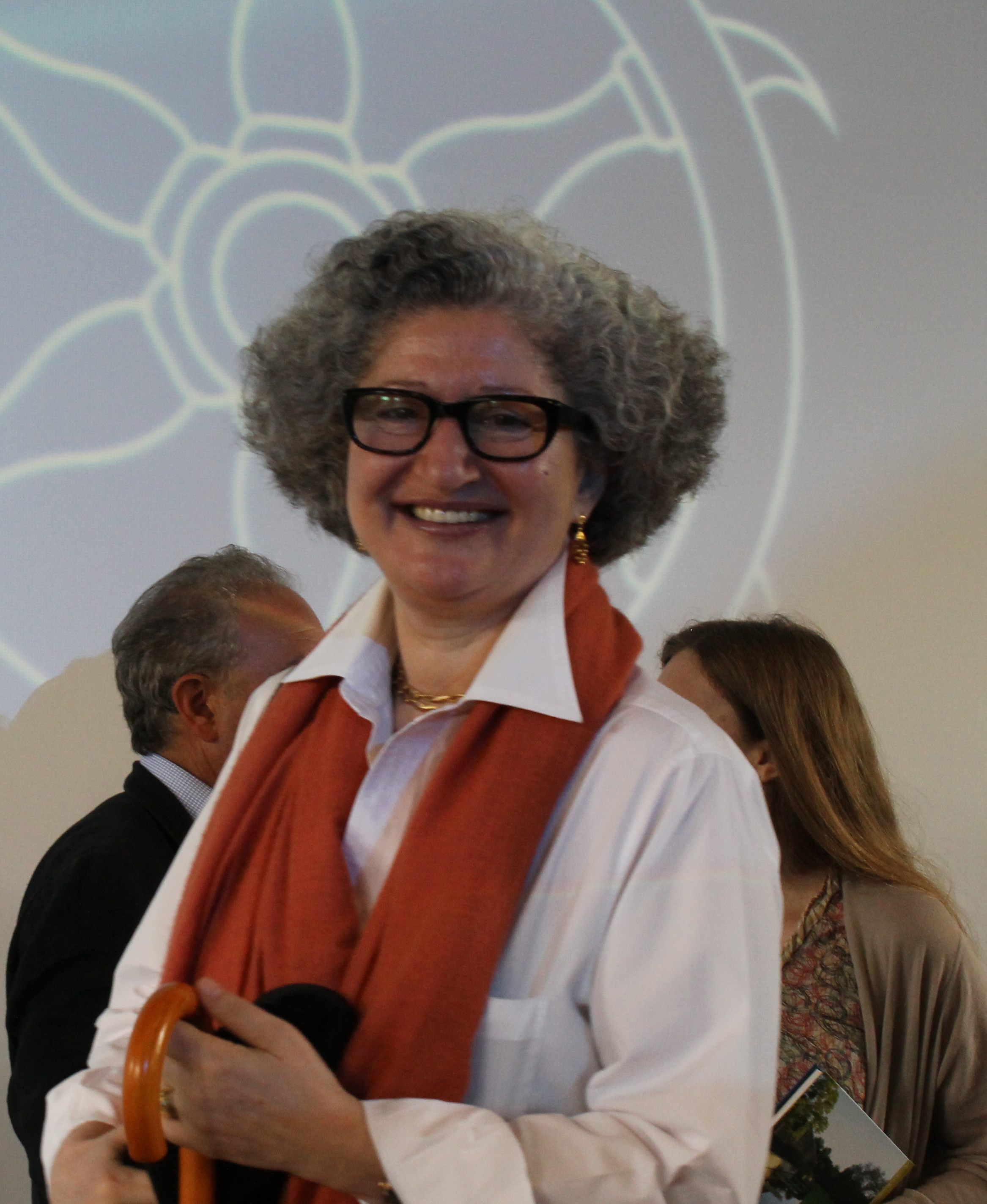
- Helou at the Oxford Symposium on Food and Cookery, 2012
- Born: 1 February 1952 (age 74); Beirut, Lebanon
- Education: Sotheby's Works of Art course
- Occupations: Chef; Food writer; Author; Teacher
- Years active: 1994–present
- Known for: Writing and teaching Mediterranean, Middle Eastern and North African cuisine
- Notable work: Lebanese Cuisine; Mediterranean Street Food; Levant; Feast: Food of the Islamic World

Anissa Helou (born 1 February 1952) is a London-based chef, teacher and author. She specialises in cooking and writing recipes for Mediterranean, Middle Eastern and North African cuisines. Her cookbooks have won numerous awards. She currently lives in London and runs a cooking school, Anissa's School.

== Biography ==
The daughter of a Syrian father from Mashta al-Helu and a Lebanese mother, Helou left her home in Beirut at the age of 21 to study interior design in London.

Following completion of the Sotheby's Works of Art course, Helou started working for the auction house, becoming their representative for the Middle East. At the age of 24, she opened an antique shop in Paris. Shortly thereafter, she became a freelance art consultant based in London. Then, between 1978 and 1986, Helou lived in Kuwait acting as an advisor to members of the ruling family, before returning to London in 1986.

Helou was inspired by the Lebanese Civil War and a friend in the publishing industry to write a cookbook. Her first work was titled, Lebanese Cuisine, and it was published in 1994. Robert Irwin described it as "no mere utilitarian manual, but a wistful evocation of feasts and picnics held in an easy going, Levantine environment which all but came to an end in 1975". The book was shortlisted for an André Simon Award.

In 1999, Helou changed her life by selling a number of collections at Christie's. She also sold her Victorian house and bought a two-story warehouse loft in Shoreditch, which she then converted into a modern, minimalist living and working space. She then opened Anissa's Kitchen in this location.

In 2013, Helou was listed by Arabian Business as one of the "500 most powerful Arabs in the world:, and one of the "100 most powerful Arab women".

Her book Levant was published in 2013 and was selected as one of The Observer Food Monthly's "20 food books of the year, one of "best books of 2013" by Gourmet Traveller , one of the "14 best cookbooks of 2013" by BuzzFeed and one of Marie-Claire Digby's "top 10 food books of the year" in 2013. Her book Feast: Food of the Islamic World was published in 2018.

== Books ==
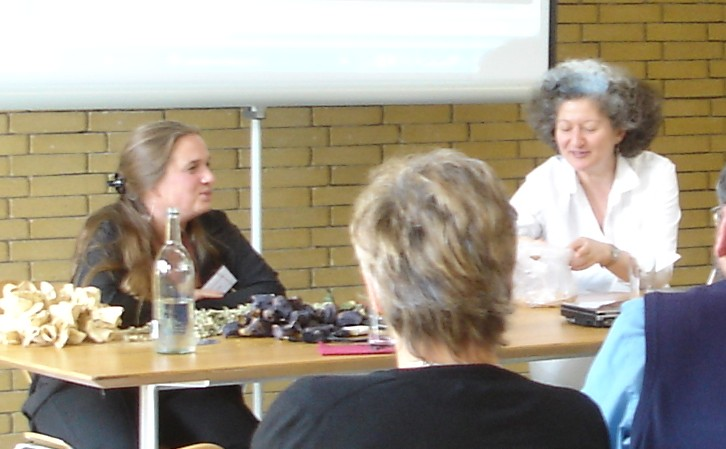
Aylin Tan (left) and Anissa Helou (right) speaking and tasting at the Oxford Symposium, 2008

- Savory Baking from the Mediterranean (2007) ISBN 9780060542191
- Modern Mezze (2007) ISBN 9781844004614
- The Fifth Quarter: An Offal Cookbook (2005) – "Most innovative UK food book", World Gourmand Awards 2005 ISBN 9781904573210
- Mediterranean Street Food (2002) – "Best Mediterranean in the English language", World Gourmand Awards 2022 ISBN 9780060891510
- Cafe Morocco (1999) ISBN 9780809226672
- Lebanese Cuisine (1994) – Andrew Simon Book Awards shortlist ISBN 9781906502188
- Levant: Recipes and memories from the Middle East (2013) ISBN 9780007448623
- Feast: Food of the Islamic World (2018) ISBN 9780062363039
- Lebanon: Cooking the Foods of My Homeland (2026) ISBN 9780063334922
