= Spoiled Milk Titties =

Song by Cupcakke

from the album Ephorize
- Released: January 5, 2018
- Genre: Dirty rap; R&B
- Length: 3:27
- Label: Self-released
- Songwriters: Elizabeth Eden Harris; Domagoj Knezović
- Producer: Def Starz

"Spoiled Milk Titties" is a song by American rapper Cupcakke from her third studio album, Ephorize.

== Background ==
"Spoiled Milk Titties" was first released on January 5, 2018 on Ephorize via TuneCore. The rapper announced that a video would be released for the song when the music video for her song "Crayons" hit 100,000 views on April 18, 2018, at 12:00PM Central Time.

== Composition and cultural references ==
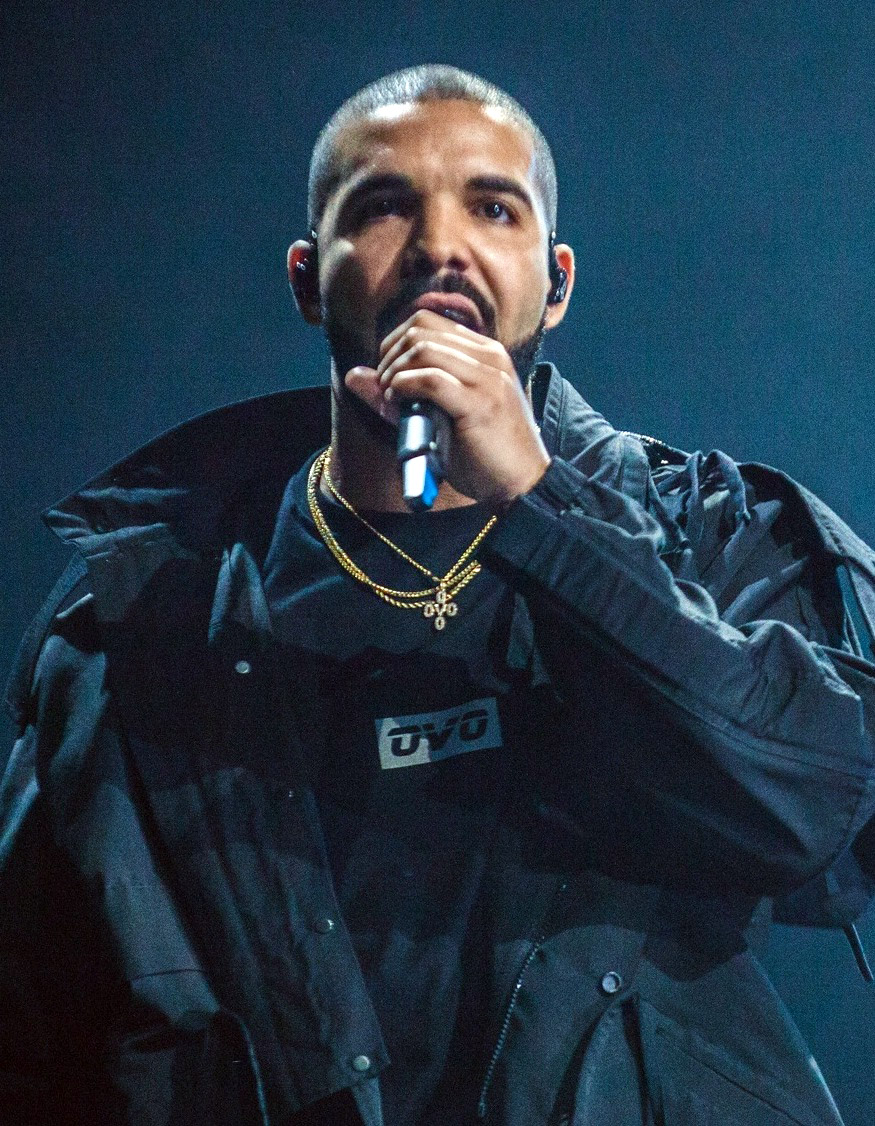
The opening line of the song includes the lyric: Slow strokes while we listenin' to Drake, referencing the Canadian rapper

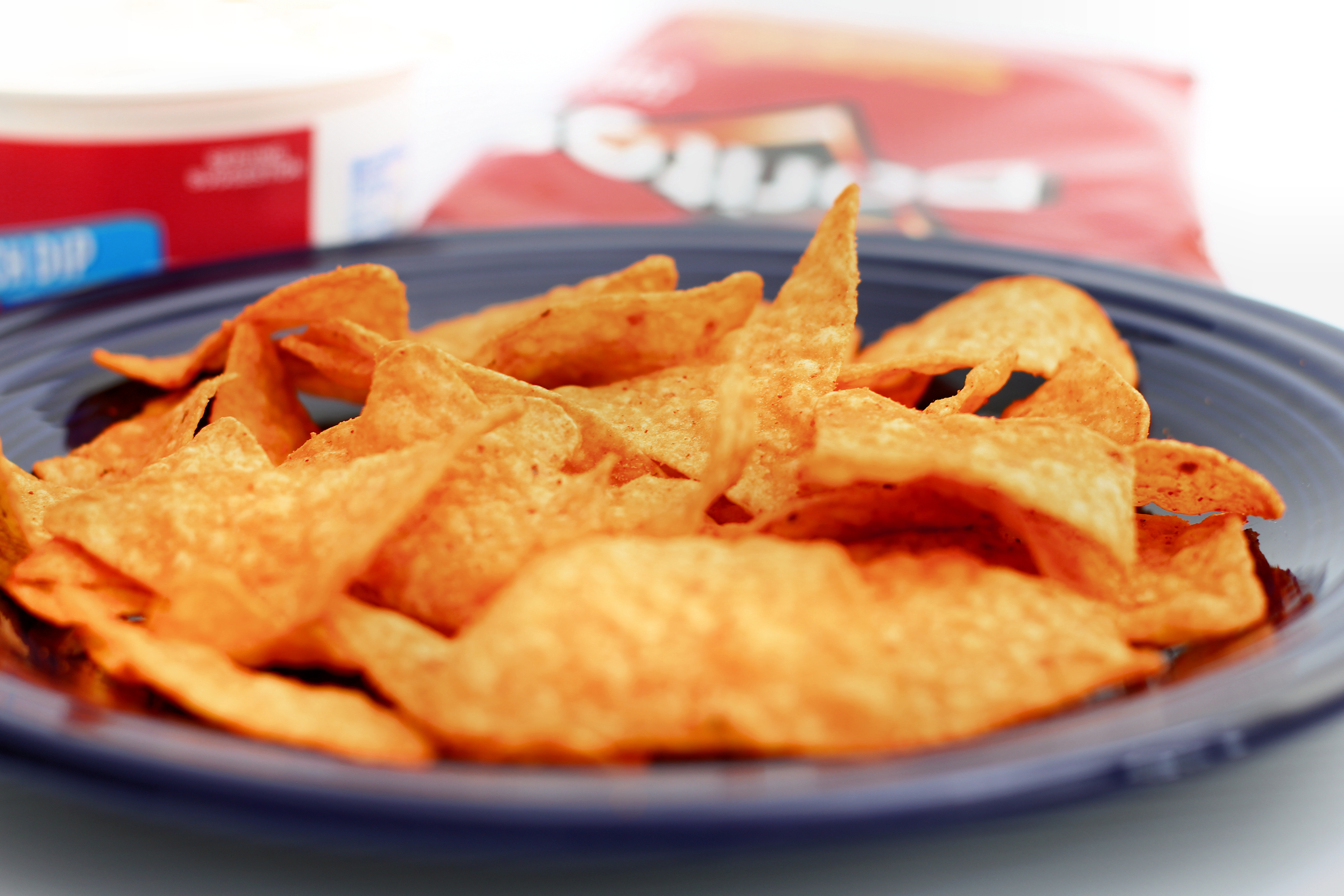
In the song's lyrics, Cupcakke claims that her Twat is an upside down Dorito

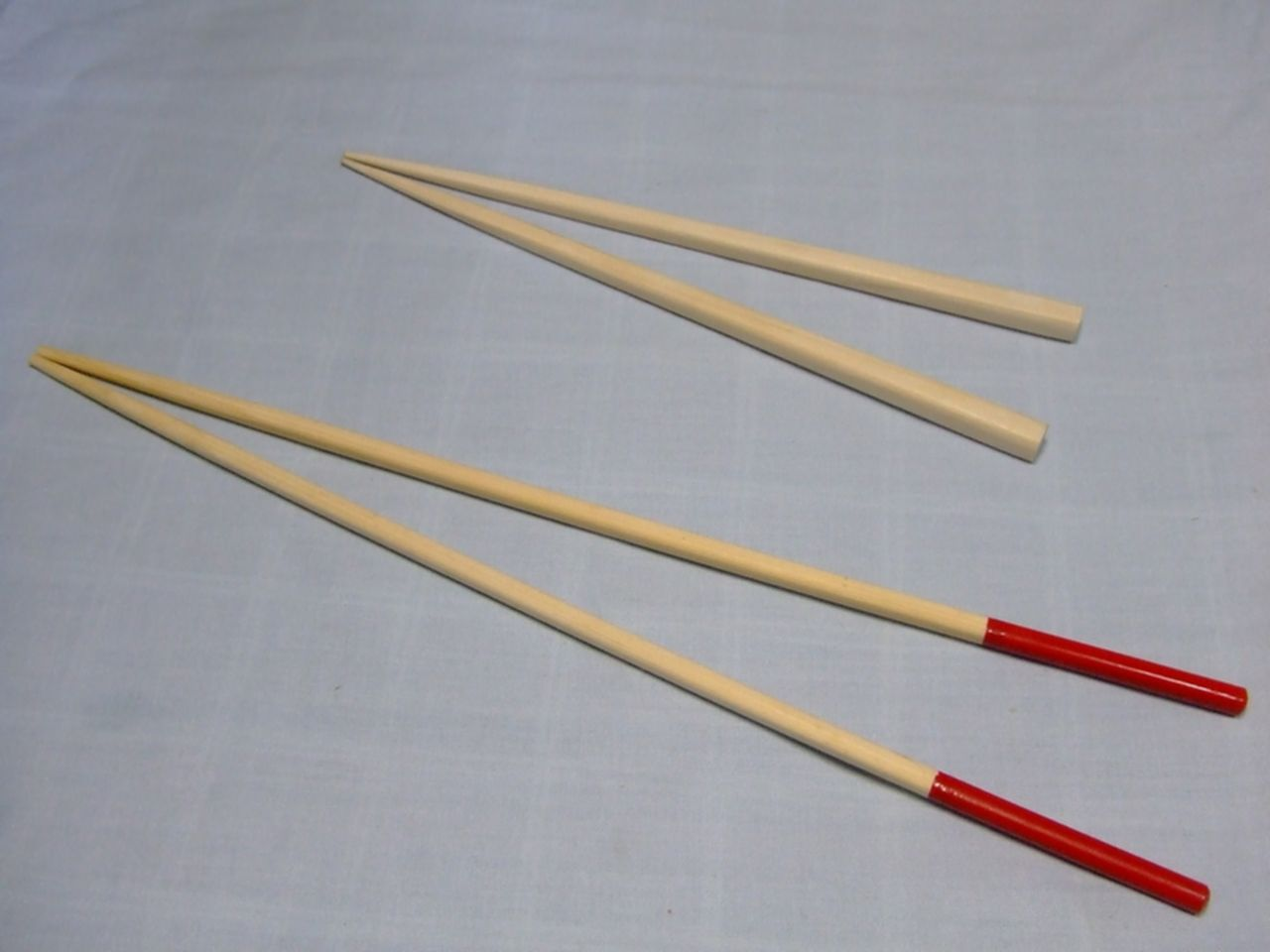
In a recurring lyrical theme, also referenced in the song Deepthroat, Cupcakke raps about picking up the dick with chopsticks and being careful when I hold it

Sonically, "Spoiled Milk Titties" evolves from a looped vocal sample into a Future Hendrix-style guitar solo. The song has vivid details with "over-the-top" sexual lyricism. Jazz Scott from Tiny Mix Tapes wrote that "Lyrically, cupcakKe hasn't sacrificed any of her raw playfulness... and her one-liners are still as pointed as they are hilarious: 'Relax me with massage, park your dick in my garage (Skrrrt!)/Do not touch my booty hairs, man, I'm feeling like Solange (uh-oh!)'".

== Music video ==
A music video was released for "Spoiled Milk Titties" via YouTube on April 18, 2018. Pitchfork called it a "spur-of-the-moment romantic excursion while she's on her way to the hospital." "The clip begins with a classic set-up: CupcakKe is off to the hospital to check on her breasts, which she explains to her neighbor are potentially spoiled", explains The Fader "before he intervenes with a suggestion to just come inside his extremely clean apartment for an impromptu romance session instead." According to Stereogum, the video starts with a "goofy introduction where CupcakKe is on her way to the hospital for her spoiled milk titties... Then a friendly guy in the neighborhood offers to check her out for free" which leads to "watching CupcakKe grind on the guy." HotNewHipHop calls it a " booty shaking visual" and chronicles that in the beginning of the video, when a guy stops her on the way to the doctor's office, she explains the meaning of "Spoiled Milk Titties": "You know how you leave a cup out for so long, a cup of milk is going to spoil eventually? I've been naked so much I think my titties are, like, spoiled." Then "they start hooking up, CupcakKe declares the guy her new Papi, and then throws down some of her most wildest verses."

== Critical reception ==
Lemonwire writes that the track is "playful and full of overt sexual references. Like any rapper, it's a bit tiring to hear Cupcakke go on about sex, but there is a refreshing aspect to her approach. Cupcakke doesn't mess around with innuendo; she says exactly what she means and she says it graphically." According to The 405, the song has "countless hilariously raunchy punchlines". Highway Queens calls it "grotesquely filthy" and writes that "she comes off sounding like Missy Elliott's more foul-mouthed daughter. There's no point being offended by these lyrics as they are exactly what a teenager who listens to a lot of rap music would write – she's playing up the controversy and relishing smashing through boundaries of taste and decency." It is explicit yet intimate, allowing you access to a realm of life most people keep closely guarded. The Outline states that Cupcakke "effortlessly braids her sex positivity with intimacy; they're two sides of the same, shame-rejecting coin."
