= Exit (Cupcakke song) =

Single by Cupcakke

from the album Ephorize
- Released: September 15, 2017
- Genre: Hip hop
- Length: 2:47
- Label: Self-released
- Songwriters: Elizabeth Eden Harris; Domagoj Knezović
- Producer: Def Starz

Cupcakke singles chronology
"Cumshot" (2017)	"Exit" (2017)	"Cartoons" (2017)

Exit is the first single by American rapper Cupcakke off her third studio album Ephorize. It was released on September 15, 2017 via TuneCore.

== Background ==
The rapper announced that a single would be coming out on September 15, 2017. She released the title and the cover art on Twitter.

== Promotion ==
A music video for "Exit" was released October 13, 2017.

== Critical reception ==
Highsnobiety commented that the song is "calling out an unfaithful ex, the Chicago rapper goes off and refuses to accept defeat." The Fader stated that "on the sweet diss track, the Chicago rapper goes off on an unfaithful ex...Even though CupcakKe was betrayed by her lover, she will not accept defeat when it comes to playing these games of the heart." Stereogum called it "a shuffling and glorious takedown track addressed to a cheating ex that gets in a ton of digs but also manages to be blisteringly introspective." Kristen Stegmoeller of Paper describes it as a "song about reading your cheating ex for filth before kicking him out of your place." To XXL, "Exit" shows that Harris has "got the crossover hit-making capabilities of Nicki Minaj or Ariana Grande." The Nation explained the song captures "that particular kind of pain that comes with realizing that something about your relationship is off, has gone suddenly sour—and also realizing that it’s neither your fault nor something you can control. Harris confronts those feelings of anger and frustration, acknowledging why they can be particularly pernicious while understanding just how magnetic the person who betrayed you can still be."
