= Dauntless Manifesto =

Studio album by Cupcakke
- Released: June 28, 2024
- Genre: Hip-hop
- Length: 44:21
- Label: Self-released
- Producers: 27corazones Beats; Suukoo; Yoshi; Hieloways; Chkody; NOROME; Cartier K; Vvsmalibu; Geam; Slug Beats; Fantom XXX; Def Starz; Black Eagle Beats; Elementrybeats; Hocii808; KYXXX; Smokeybeats; Mad Young; JustDanBeats

Cupcakke chronology
Eden (2018)	Dauntless Manifesto (2024)	The Bakkery (2025)

Singles from Dauntless Manifesto
- 1. "Grilling Niggas II" Released: July 1, 2024

Dauntless Manifesto is the fifth studio album by American rapper CupcakKe, released independently on June 28, 2024. It is her first full-length project in nearly six years since the release of Eden (2018). It was supported by the lead single "Grilling Niggas II", and viral TikTok hit "Backstage Passes."

== Background ==
In 2018, she released her fourth studio album, Eden. The following year, she was reportedly taken to a hospital in Chicago after tweeting that she was going to commit suicide. She went on a short hiatus, returning to music the following year with the single "Lawd Jesus". She continued to release a series of stand-alone singles, including "Squidward Nose" and the commercially successful "Discounts". The latter became her first charting single, debuting at number 10 on the Billboard Digital Songs component chart.

In 2021, she announced the release of her next album in an interview with People, which would be inspired on the self reflection that came from her mental health struggles over the years. Also in 2021, Cupcakke experienced social media virality on TikTok due to multiple songs being remixed with her sexually explicit lyrics.

Finally, in 2024, two days before the release of the album, she revealed the tracklist via Twitter as well as the cover art. Also via Twitter, she commented on the album's topics, tweeting "this album speaks on police brutality, body positivity, racism, poverty, suicide, self love, etc".

== Promotion ==
The song "Grilling Niggas II" served as the lead single for the album. A music video for the song was uploaded to YouTube on July 1, 2024, directed by Legit Looks. "Backstage Passes" however would serve as a promotional single for TikTok, as it goes viral. Other songs would also get TikTok treatment, such as "Little Red Riding Good", and "Queef".

To promote the album, CupcakKe embarked on the Dauntless Manifesto Tour, which included concerts in multiple cities from the United States and Canada.

== Critical reception ==
Professional ratings
Review scores
Source	Rating
Beats Per Minute	78/100
Clash	8/10
Jenesaispop	7.8/10
The Needle Drop	6.5/10

The album received mostly positive reviews from critics, who praised cupcakKe's lyricism as well as the variety of sounds in the album. Lucas Martins from Beats Per Minute described the album as "diverse in flows, production, and genre in a way that shows the true range of CupcakKe as an artist". Sam Franzini from Clash wrote that the album is "dizzying, broad in its scope and consistently surprising, never taking itself too seriously without undermining CupcakKe’s strength as a rapper". Fernando García from Jenesaispop singled out the songs "Grilling Niggas II", "Water Balloon", "Queef" and "Dementia" as the album's highlights while also praising the blend of CupcakKe's usual sexually charged lyrics with "a strong conviction for social justice". Arthur Diaz from SLUG wrote "with her fifth album, cupcakKe presents her most thoughtful project", praising the album's lyricism.

In a more mixed review, Anthony Fantano called the album "entertainment", also commenting that "After a while, I do need a horny break, maybe watch some Mr. Rogers or take a cold shower. What's unfortunate is that there aren't that many moments throughout this record where CupcakKe is deviating from that script, and when she does, it just feels so profoundly out of place.".

== Track listing ==
All tracks are written by CupcakKe, credited as Elizabeth Harris.

Dauntless Manifesto track listing
No.	Title	Producer(s)	Length
1.	"Grilling Niggas II"	27corazones Beats	3:04
2.	"Connect 4"	Suukoo; Yoshi	3:00
3.	"Water Balloon"	Hieloways	3:30
4.	"Rock Paper Scissors"	Chkody	3:11
5.	"Dora"	NOROMEO	2:15
6.	"Queef"	Cartier K; Vvsmalibu	2:25
7.	"Aura"	Geam	2:43
8.	"Dui"	Slug Beats	2:16
9.	"Double Homicide"	Fantom XXX	1:57
10.	"Little Red Riding Good"	Def Starz	3:16
11.	"Cody"	Black Eagle Beats	3:00
12.	"Nun Nun"	Elementrybeats; Hocii808	2:15
13.	"Yawn"	KYXXX; Smokeybeats	2:23
14.	"Dementia"	Def Starz	3:13
15.	"Backstage Passes"	Mad Young	2:17
16.	"Cruella"	JustDanBeats	3:29
Total length:			44:21
