= Ephorize =

2018 studio album by Cupcakke

Studio album by Cupcakke
- Released: January 5, 2018
- Recorded: 2017
- Genre: Hip-hop
- Length: 46:41
- Label: Self-release; TuneCore
- Producer: Def Starz; Turreekk

Cupcakke chronology
Queen Elizabitch (2017)	Ephorize (2018)	Eden (2018)

Singles from Ephorize
- 1. "Exit" Released: September 15, 2017; 2. "Cartoons" Released: November 10, 2017

Ephorize is the third studio album by American rapper Cupcakke. It was self-released on January 5, 2018 via TuneCore, after being announced on her official Twitter. The Ephorize Tour was later announced to promote the album and began on February 21, 2018.

== Background ==
On December 20, 2017, Cupcakke revealed the title and cover art of the album through Twitter. The track listing was announced on December 27, 2017, via her Twitter account.

On December 29, 2017, Cupcakke announced the album pre-order on Twitter.

== Composition ==
Pitchfork believed Ephorize's themes to be "self-esteem, LGBTQ issues, and the desire for genuine romance" and compared Cupcakke's "absurdist one-liners" to Ghostface Killah. HotNewHipHop believed the album to be "one of the most introspective bodies of work she's dropped off to date". The Observer described the album's production as a mix of "old-school hip-hop, futuristic pop and [..] Latin". Bijan Stephen from The Nation commented that "in nearly every song, you can hear shades of trap, drill, bounce, and reggaeton, with Harris's voice making the whole thing hang together."

"Duck Duck Goose" has been described as a sex rap song that "flirts with New Orleans bounce". "Total" was described as "[embracing] the muted dembow pop varietal known as tropical house". The synth flute lines in "Navel" were likened to the synth flutes used in "Mask Off". "Crayons", which has been dubbed a "pro-LGBTQ anthem", features reggaeton percussion, and lyrics "in praise of the queer community". "Meet and Greet" and "Wisdom Teeth" are drill songs "with added gloss". Lyrically, "Cartoons" has been described as "[flipping] children's icons into totems for not taking shit". "Self Interview" depicts "the external expectations put on women as they transition from childhood to adulthood", particularly through the line "Back then we had lipgloss and some overalls, that's the usual/Nowadays I gotta show skin and wear sew-ins to feel beautiful". The Red & Black described "Fullest" as "a fun, fast-paced song that takes certain elements common to Latin music and incorporates them into the track."

== Promotion ==
=== Singles ===
"Exit" was released as the first single off the album as a digital download on September 15, 2017. "Cartoons" was released as the second single on November 10, 2017.

=== Music videos ===
"Exit" received a music video on October 13, 2017. "Cartoons" received a music video on November 18, 2017. "Duck Duck Goose" received a music video on January 15, 2018. According to Michelle Kim of Pitchfork, the "NSFW" video features "a bunch of dildos" and Cupcakke dressed in a duck onesie. "Fullest" received a music video on February 20, 2018. The Fader wrote that "the 'Fullest' visual shows what really goes down when CupcakKe throws a house party— and what happens to sloppy uninvited guests." "Crayons" received a video on Sunday March 25, 2018. Rolling Stone added, "the Chicago rapper and a group of strangers rally to defend a gay couple who are harassed on the sidewalk. Their union turns into a street party, with the emcee proudly flying a rainbow flag."

=== Tour ===
A concert tour was announced via Harris's Twitter page in order to promote the album. The Ephorize Tour started February 21, 2018 in Chicago, Illinois and originally ended March 15, 2018 in Houston, Texas, but had a Pawtucket show postponed to April 20, 2018. This was Harris's first tour with shows in Europe.

== Critical reception ==
Professional ratings
Aggregate scores
Source	Rating
AnyDecentMusic?	7.3/10
Metacritic	84/100
Review scores
Source	Rating
The 405	8/10
Crack Magazine	8/10
Financial Times	3/5 stars
The Observer	4/5 stars
Pitchfork	8.3/10
Spectrum Culture	3.5/5 stars
Tiny Mix Tapes	4/5
Vice (Expert Witness)	A−
XXL	4/5

The album received universal acclaim from music critics, with several music sites praising its evolution from Harris's previous projects. MTV UK described it as "further proof that she's one of the most versatile, quick-witted and consistent rappers in the game." Exclaim! stated that "the latest offering hears Cupcakke presenting her most polished work to date, though she still slides in plenty of deliciously dirty one-liners throughout the new record." HotNewHipHop noted "cupcakKe's attitude is one of the many stand-out attributes in her music. While the raunchiness in her music has been a quality that she's known for, she still touches on more serious topics at the same time. Ephorize might be one of the most introspective bodies of work she's dropped off to date." Pitchfork awarded the album with the publication's "Best New Music" accolade, calling it Cupcakke's "best album yet, with terrific production and a barrage of raps that reveal Elizabeth Harris to be far more than her hilarious and absurdly raunchy one-liners". Writing for Vulture, Craig Jenkins noted that "Ephorize’s introspective moments give it depth to match its more colorful material's brusqueness and vulgarity." He also stated that "at her best, CupcakKe is a semi-automatic fully loaded with ridiculous puns." Veteran music critic Robert Christgau wrote of the album in his column for Vice: "It would be silly to assume all this homeless-shelter graduate's literotica is literal. But from the armpit-licking 'Spoiled Milk Titties' to the dickhead-picking 'Duck Duck Goose', believe she's gotten closer to real-life versions of the carnal variations she dreams up than the average Soundcloud trapper has to the carnage he's mumbling about."

=== Accolades ===
Year-end lists
Publication	List	Rank	Ref.
Highsnobiety	The 25 Best Albums of 2018	5	
Pitchfork	The 50 Best Albums of 2018	12	
Gaffa	Gaffa's Best Albums of 2018	15	
Thrillist	The Best Albums of 2018	15	
Rolling Stone	The 200 Greatest Hip-Hop Albums of All Time	195	

== Track listing ==
Adapted from ASCAP and BMI. All tracks were produced by Def Stars, except where noted.

All tracks are written by Elizabeth Harris.

Ephorize track listing
No.	Title	Producer(s)	Length
1.	"2 Minutes"		3:13
2.	"Cartoons"	Turreekk	2:31
3.	"Duck Duck Goose"	Def Starz	3:13
4.	"Wisdom Teeth"		2:40
5.	"Crayons"	Def Starz	3:11
6.	"Cinnamon Toast Crunch"		4:01
7.	"Exit"		2:47
8.	"Self Interview"	Turreekk	2:54
9.	"Navel"		2:37
10.	"Spoiled Milk Titties"		3:27
11.	"Total"		3:13
12.	"Post Pic"		3:29
13.	"Meet and Greet"	Turreekk	2:58
14.	"Single While Taken"		2:49
15.	"Fullest"		3:38
Total length:			46:41

== Charts ==
Chart (2018)	Peak position
New Zealand Heatseeker Albums (RMNZ)	6
US Heatseekers Albums (Billboard)	2
US Independent Albums (Billboard)	18
