= Crayons (song) =

Song by American rapper Cupcakke

Song by Cupcakke

from the album Ephorize
- Released: 2018
- Genre: LGBT hip hop; dancehall; hip house
- Length: 3:11
- Label: Self-released
- Songwriters: Elizabeth Eden Harris; Domagoj Knezović
- Producer: Def Starz

"Crayons" is a song by independent American rapper Cupcakke from her third studio album Ephorize. The track features a pro-LGBTQ message.

== Background ==
The song was first released on the album Ephorize. The rapper announced that when her "Fullest" music video garnered 200,000 views, she would release a music video for "Crayons".

== Composition ==
Sonically, the track uses "reggaeton percussion" and borrows reggaeton elements. The Orlando Weekly writes that "On 'Crayons,' Harris issues a big fuck you to anyone perpetuating discriminatory practices in lieu of equal rights for LGBTQ people." The Red & Black stated that "as the LGBT flag has all the colors of the rainbow, so do the crayons she mentions in her song. In the first verse, she asserts her stance and stands with the queer community, saying, Love is love, who give a fuck?" XXL wrote that the "LGBTQ-advocating track that showcases her chameleon-like ability to adapt to any beat she touches—this one pulls from reggaeton with its club-ready drums and spurts of pungent horns." Jazz Scott from Tiny Mix Tapes noted it as "fractured dancehall" and MTV dubbed it as a "pro-LGBT rights anthem." Pitchfork wrote that "As isolated horn blasts erupt, she lobbies for sexual and gender equality for all, weaning out the intolerant in the process" and called "Crayons" a "hip-house jam."

== Critical reception ==
According to the Chicago Tribune, the "song has garnered plenty of attention as well as critical acclaim for its strong, LGBTQ-affirming message." XXL praised "Crayons" for its "high energy and repetition", but stated that it "also reflects CupcakKe's occasionally lazy songwriting; it feels as if she came up with the hook in just a few minutes." The 405 states that the song "can still feel a tad clumsy and overstated" and goes on to say "'Crayons' finds her characteristic cleverness replaced by a well-intended jackhammer, repeating 'Boy on boy / Girl on girl', with CupcakKe pointing out she has a gay stylist. It's hard to find any fault with her, giving much needed voice in a homophobic musical arena, but one hopes she finds a way to more naturally graft it into her songwriting." Vulture described it as an "emotional sequel" to "LGBT", a song on Harris's debut album, Audacious, and went on to write "CupcakKe can turn raunch into a kind of high lyrical art, but beyond the pearl-clutching moments, the message of "Crayons" is just really nice. After stringing up her pride flag and announcing, "It's all about the taste of rainbows and colors. The gays gonna serve you life like a butler," she serves up matter-of-fact calls for equality that renounce double standards of judgment applied to gay men versus gay women, and calls for everyone to come together under the banner of love." Viri Garcia of The Cornell Daily Sun wrote that "'Crayons' not only demonstrates CupcakKe's growth as a writer and artist, but as a person. This time around, she shows a better perspective of the community and criticizes problematic stereotypes." Pitchfork writes that the song "embodies true allyship, representing the experiences of others without centering their proximity to CupcakKe's own" and goes on to praise it saying, "while "Crayons" has CupcakKe's usual share of quotables..., many lines are remarkably pithy and direct, delivered with her forward, take-no-prisoners tactics. She's great at stringing together zingers, but even better at making her point in the clearest way possible."

"Everyone deserves love no matter who you like or who you want to marry," she told Out Magazine last year. "If you like a gal [and/or] guy, that's on you, and have fun with it. That's who you are, and there's nothing wrong with that."

— Harris discussing gay marriage

== Music video ==
A video for "Crayons" was released on March 25, 2018 via YouTube. According to The Fader, the video features "a group of colorfully dressed people to provide visuals for her LGBT positive message" and that "she delivers sunshine and positivity in a way that only CupcakKe can." The Rolling Stone added, "the Chicago rapper and a group of strangers rally to defend a gay couple who are harassed on the sidewalk. Their union turns into a street party, with the emcee proudly flying a rainbow flag. Elsewhere in the clip, CupcakKe raps in a dark room while wearing a glow-in-the-dark fur coat. Noisey wrote that a song "which celebrates guy-on-guy shagging" and "LGBTQ+ love" now has a "day-glo video to match" and went on to say that it was "a delight to see CupcakKe frolicking in primary colours, surrounded by people who... are as adamant that homophobia and transphobia have no place in society today." HotNewHipHop summarized the video as "two boys holding hands and walking down the street, until they're called out by another man standing on the sidewalk, who clearly doesn't approve of their relationship. However, their argument is broken up when about 10-15 other people show up to instead hold a dance party." Amanda Wicks of Pitchfork wrote the rapper "celebrates equality with a big dance party in the streets." Stereogum wrote something of similar detail, stating that the rapper "[celebrates] all forms of love (and lust) by dancing in the streets and waving a rainbow flag."
