= Cartoons (Cupcakke song) =

Single by Cupcakke

from the album Ephorize
- Released: November 10, 2017
- Genre: Drill
- Length: 2:31
- Label: Self-released
- Songwriters: Elizabeth Eden Harris; Omer Agca
- Producer: Turreekk

Cupcakke singles chronology
"Exit" (2017)	"Cartoons" (2017)	"Quiz" (2018)

Cartoons is the second single by American rapper Cupcakke from her third studio album Ephorize. The song was released on November 10, 2017 via TuneCore. It received recognition from Cardi B, with the rapper posting a line from the song on her Twitter.

== Background ==
CupcakKe announced a single would be coming on November 10, 2017 via her Twitter page. "Cartoons" was then released as a digital download."

== Promotion ==
"Cartoons" received a music video on November 18, 2017.

== Critical reception ==
The Musical Hype wrote "'Cartoons'" opens mysteriously, with quirky, 'seedy-sounding' production that foreshadows the heat that's about to drop. Expectedly, cupcakKe enters turned up to the nth degree. The rhymes are quick, hard AF, and not nearly as childish or playful as the title might suggest. Even so, cupcakKe does deliver a cartoonish, catchy hook: If I see carats-carrots like Bugs Bunny / I’m Batman, robbin’-Robin for the money / Strip her, bare feet like the Flintstones / Make a Tom and Jerry whole way home / I’m a snack so I attract Scooby Doo’s / Give ‘em Smurf dick, that’s balls blue / I don’t look for niggas so fuck Waldo / Bitch, I’m cocky like Johnny Bravo." Andrew Matson from Mass Appeal commented, "Lyrically, 'Cartoons' is a flex-a-thon, with a chorus name-checking all kinds of cartoon characters CupcakKe makes the formal concept sound easy [...] Rhymes seem to come naturally to her, whether freeform or based on a theme." "Her flow is incredible as she raps over a unique beat filled with all sorts of metallic percussion. Her lyrical capabilities are as great as ever as she combines her sex positivity with some braggadocios bars" wrote The Next Wave Chicago. XXL calls it "a more traditional, hammering drill track that finds her firing off a barrage of flamboyant, quick-witted flexes in an impressive display of breath control."
