= S.T.D (Shelters to Deltas) =

2016 mixtape by Cupcakke

Mixtape by Cupcakke
- Released: June 19, 2016
- Genre: Hip-hop
- Length: 32:25
- Label: Self-release; TuneCore
- Producer: Def Starz; Energy Brooks; Benzo Fly; Dmaij; Seemaple; Stasia; PK Beats; Truda; Reddman Bangerz; The Famous Fe Chi

Cupcakke chronology
| Cum Cake (2016) | S.T.D (Shelters to Deltas) (2016) | Audacious (2016) |

Updated cover

Singles from S.T.D (Shelters to Deltas)
- 1. "Best Dick Sucker" Released: April 25, 2016; 2. "Panda (Remix)" Released: May 15, 2016

S.T.D (Shelters to Deltas) is the second mixtape by American rapper Cupcakke. It was self-released on June 19, 2016. It was preceded by her debut mixtape Cum Cake, and was promoted with its preceding singles, "Best Dick Sucker" and "Panda (Remix)".

Upon release, S.T.D received generally positive reviews from music critics, who complimented its explicit nature and the execution of topics throughout the album. The mixtape was given a position in Rolling Stone's "Best Rap Albums of 2016 So Far".

== Background and release ==
Cupcakke collaborated with artists, including Zachariah's "Hood Rich", Kilo's "Short Bus", Big Meechie and his single "Muve", M.A.N. II's "Man Pussy", and frequent producer on Cupcakke's mixtape, Benzo Fly and his Random Act's single "Like a Snapback".

S.T.D (Shelters to Deltas) was self-released for digital download and streaming on June 19, 2016, through iTunes, SoundCloud, Google Play and Spotify.

== Promotion ==
=== Singles ===
The preceding singles, "Best Dick Sucker" and "Panda (Remix)", were released on April 25, 2016, and May 15, 2016.

=== Music videos ===
S.T.D's first single "Best Dick Sucker" received a music video upon its release on April 25, 2016. "Opportunity" received a music video on June 25, 2016. "Doggy Style"'s music video was released on July 6, 2016. On July 14, 2016, the "Motherlands" music video was released. The music video for "Sweet N Low" was released on August 24, 2016. "Interruption" received a music video on September 11, 2016.

== Critical reception ==
Rolling Stone gave it a position in its "Best Rap Albums of 2016" list, with Christopher Weingarten calling the mixtape's lyrics "filthy and funny enough to make sure Blowfly's legacy will live on for years after his death". Miles Tanzer of The Fader accolades the mixtape with its lyrics, which he states that "Cool Fuck" and "Best Dick Sucker" were "anthemic tracks that discuss sex and cum with the fervor, comedy, and creativity of the world's best preachers".

== Track listing ==
Credits adapted from SoundCloud, ASCAP, and Broadcast Music, Inc.

S.T.D (Shelters to Deltas) track listing
| No. | Title | Writer(s) | Producer(s) | Length |
|---|---|---|---|---|
| 1. | "Best Dick Sucker" | Elizabeth Eden Harris | Energy Brooks | 2:29 |
| 2. | "Cool Fuck" | Harris | Truda | 1:02 |
| 3. | "Opportunity" | Harris | Reddman Bangerz | 4:48 |
| 4. | "Motherlands" | Harris | Stasia | 3:24 |
| 5. | "Doggy Style" | Harris | Def Starz | 3:18 |
| 6. | "Reality, Pt. 3" | Harris | | 2:05 |
| 7. | "Portions" | Harris | Energy Brooks | 2:47 |
| 8. | "O.C.D" | Harris | The Famous Fe Chi | 3:02 |
| 9. | "Sweet N Low" | Harris; Deshawn Ward | Seemaple | 2:37 |
| 10. | "Odd" | Harris | PK Beats | 2:16 |
| 11. | "Distraction" | Harris | Benzo Fly | 1:54 |
| 12. | "Interruption" | Harris | Benzo Fly | 2:43 |
| Total length: | | | | 32:25 |

S.T.D (Shelters to Deltas) SoundCloud bonus track
| No. | Title | Writer(s) | Producer(s) | Length |
|---|---|---|---|---|
| 13. | "Panda Remix" (featuring Dmaij) | Harris; Sidney Selby III; Adnan Khan | Dmaij; Menace | 4:04 |
| Total length: | | | | 36:29 |
