= Duck, duck, goose (disambiguation) =

Duck, duck, goose is a children's game.

Duck, duck, goose may also refer to:

- Duck Duck Goose (film), a 2018 Chinese animated film
- Duck, Duck, Goose!, a film short written and directed by D. C. Douglas
- "Duck Duck Goose" (song), by Cupcakke
- "Duck Duck Goose" (Eureka), Eureka episode

== See also ==
- DuckDuckGo, an internet search engine
