= Deep Throat =

Deep Throat, deep-throat or deepthroat may refer to:

== Arts and entertainment ==
- Deep Throat (film), a 1972 pornographic film
- Deep Throat (The X-Files), a character in The X-Files
  - "Deep Throat" (The X-Files episode), 1993
- Gray Fox (Metal Gear) (also written as 'Deepthroat'), a character in the 1998 Metal Gear Solid
- Deep Throat (album), 2002, by Henry Rollins
- "Deep Throats", a 2006 episode of Family Guy
- "Deepthroat" (song), 2015, by American rapper Cupcakke from the album Cum Cake

== Other uses ==
- Deep-throating, a type of fellatio
- Deep Throat (Watergate), the anonymous source (later revealed to be Mark Felt) in The Washington Post investigation of U.S. President Nixon's 1972 Watergate scandal
- The Deep Throat Sex Scandal, 2010 American play
