= Tit for Tat (disambiguation) =

Tit for tat is an English saying meaning "equivalent retaliation".

Tit for Tat may also refer to:

- Tit for Tat (play), a 1786 play by George Colman the Elder
- Tit for Tat (novel), an 1856 novel written anonymously
- Tit for Tat (1904 film), a French short silent film
- Tit for Tat (1921 film), a British silent comedy film
- Tit for Tat (1935 film), a short comedy film starring Laurel and Hardy
- "Tit for Tat" (7th Heaven), an episode of the TV series 7th Heaven
- "Tit for Tat (Ain't No Taking Back)", a 1968 Christmas song by James Brown
- "Tit for Tat" (Tate McRae song), 2025
- "Tit for Tat", a song by 6lack from his 2023 album Since I Have a Lover
- "Tit for Tat", a song by Eddy Grant from his 2006 album Reparation
- "Tit for Tat", a song by Cupcakke from her 2016 mixtape Cum Cake
- "Tit for Tat", a story from The Railway Series 1967 book: Small Railway Engines
- Tit for Tat, a song cycle for voice and piano; see List of compositions by Benjamin Britten#Vocal
- "Tit 4 a Tat", a song by Moka Only from the album Carrots and Eggs, 2008

== See also ==
- Reciprocity (disambiguation)
- Ek Se Badhkar Ek (disambiguation)
