= Quiz (song) =

Single by Cupcakke

from the album Eden
- Released: April 27, 2018
- Genre: Hip hop
- Length: 2:18
- Label: Self-released
- Songwriters: Elizabeth Eden Harris; Omer Agca
- Producer: Turreekk

Cupcakke singles chronology
| "Cartoons" (2017) | "Quiz" (2018) | "Hot Pockets" (2018) |

"Quiz" is a song by American rapper Cupcakke, released on April 27, 2018, as the first single from her fourth studio album Eden (2018). The song was written by Cupcakke herself and produced by Turreekk.

== Background ==
CupcakKe released a series of photos on her Instagram that added up to the cover of the song and revealed the artwork for a single on Twitter. The song was released on April 27, 2018, via TuneCore.

== Composition ==
"Quiz" was produced by Turreekk. Highsnobiety writes that the track is "sublimely manic", with the rapper's "in-your-face bars [melding]" with Turreekk's "abrasive production". According to Gay Times, "Quiz" thrives on the star's energetic flow and explicit lyrics, "as bouncy electronics and hard beats make it a welcome addition to her ever-growing catalogue." Over swirls of synths, warped drills, and hand claps, the rapper "tears through each verse like a Category 6 hurricane, destroying everything in her path." XXL notes how the rapper touches on some of her favorite food establishments with "vociferous pace", even referencing 50 Cent's acclaimed debut album title: Might buy the Uber man some, it depends on how the line fly/Or he could keep the 50 Cent change/Get rich or die tryin.

== Critical reception ==
Stereogum states that Cupcakke left her mark and "goes hard as hell over a beat that's pure energy". Spin calls it "the hardest, heaviest single from the musician since her track 'Cinnamon Toast Crunch'", with a "single punch of gross-out euphoria". Pitchfork called "Quiz" a roaring takedown "so riotous you can feel the weight of a mosh pit hurling around you" and dubbed it "pure party power", further stating that "Rowdy, rhythmic zig-zags feel ferociously amplified when paired with CupcakKe's lyrical intensity."
