= Fullest =

Song by Cupcakke

from the album Ephorize
- Released: January 5, 2018
- Genre: Hip hop; Bossa nova
- Length: 3:38
- Label: Self-released
- Songwriters: Elizabeth Eden Harris; Domagoj Knezović
- Producer: Def Starz

Fullest is the fourth single by independent American rapper Cupcakke from her third studio album Ephorize.

== Background ==
The song was originally released on January 5, 2018, as part of her album. The rapper later announced on Instagram that she would release the music video for "Fullest" if her post received 5,000 comments.

== Composition ==
Madeline Laguaite from The Red & Black described the song as "a fun, fast-paced song that takes certain elements common to Latin music and incorporates them into the track. CupcakKe is full of confidence and self-assurance throughout the song, with lines like 'You can't ever make me look foolish' and 'my bank account look the fullest.' The track winds down with the post-chorus and a claim that 'them bitches still ain't the fullest.'" Jazz Scott from Tiny Mix Tapes claimed it to be bossa nova.

== Music video ==
Harris released the music video for "Fullest" via her YouTube channel on February 20, 2018. Salvatore Maicki from The Fader described it as "vibrant and gloriously gaudy in all the ways a CupcakKe video should be" and went on to say "the 'Fullest' visual shows what really goes down when CupcakKe throws a house party— and what happens to sloppy uninvited guests." Dennis Hinzmann from Out wrote that "the rapper shows us what a house party for the Instagram generation looks like. Millennial pink palette: check. Inflatable pool animal: check. Neon backlighting to ensure everyone finds their best angle: check" and goes on to say "the party bumps around the rapper. That is, until some messy, uninvited guests show up. A coordinated withering glare followed by beachballs and squirt guns eject the would-be crashers, so the party can go on."
