= Vagina (song) =

2015 single by Cupcakke

Single by Cupcakke

from the album Cum Cake
- Released: October 9, 2015
- Genre: Dirty rap; comedy hip hop
- Length: 3:26
- Songwriters: Elizabeth Harris; Marlon Ward
- Producer: SeeMaple

Cupcakke singles chronology
"Vagina" (2015)	"Deepthroat" (2015)

"Vagina" is a song by American rapper Cupcakke, released on October 9, 2015 as the lead single from her first mixtape Cum Cake (2016). It gained popularity on the Internet, helping Cupcakke rise to fame before her follow-up song "Deepthroat" propelled her to further recognition.

== Background ==
According to Cupcakke, her inspiration to write the song came from the song "My Neck, My Back (Lick It)" by Khia. While Cupcakke recorded the song in the studio, the engineer was surprised at her using the word banana vulgarly and said "This is gonna be something else!" Cupcakke was encouraged to release the song by others, though her mother was initially hesitant, telling her "You want to keep the innocence in the child as much as you can, but you can only do so much." Cupcakke reassured her that it was "just a song". The music video went viral overnight, garnering 40,000 views, and was on WorldStarHipHop by the next day.

== Composition ==
The song features "sparse keyboard stabs and a driving beat", as well as moans from Cupcakke. A sexually explicit song, she repeatedly raps about being "wet".

== Music video ==
The music video shows Cupcakke topless and wearing rainbow pasties and sporty knee socks. She licks a large lollipop and cucumber.

== TikTok virality ==
In July 2021, the song renewed popularity through TikTok, when fan-produced mashups of the song known as "CupcakKe remixes" began gaining traction on the platform.
