= Queen Elizabitch =

2017 studio album by Cupcakke

Studio album by CupcakKe
- Released: March 31, 2017
- Genre: Hip hop
- Length: 38:52
- Label: Self-released; TuneCore

CupcakKe chronology
Audacious (2016)	Queen Elizabitch (2017)	Ephorize (2018)

Singles from Queen Elizabitch
- 1. "Cumshot" Released: February 24, 2017

Queen Elizabitch is the second studio album by American rapper CupcakKe. It was self-released on March 31, 2017. The album was preceded by its leading single "Cumshot". However, the album's track "CPR", got attention from the video-sharing app, TikTok. The song received over 100 million streams on the music-streaming app Spotify.

== Background and release ==
On March 28, CupcakKe revealed the album cover and track listing. Queen Elizabitch was self-released on March 31, 2017, in distribution to TuneCore.

On April 8, the album was briefly removed from streaming services due to a production discrepancy, but returned days later.

== Composition ==
According to Pitchfork writer Briana Younger, album opener "Scraps" features "disquieting keys and decaying synths". "33rd" has been described in The Fader as an "all-out pop banger". Pitchfork's Younger also described "Biggie Smalls" as a body-positive song about beauty standards and eating disorders, and its production as a "jungle-like trance". She pointed to "Tarzan" as a drill track, while she and The Fader, as well as Stereogum, referred to the album closer "Reality Pt. 4" as an a capella track reflecting on CupcakKe's life and politics.

== Promotion ==
=== Singles ===
"Cumshot" was released as a digital download on February 24, 2017 as the album's lead single.

=== Music videos ===
"Cumshot" received a music video on March 10, 2017. "Reality Pt. 4" received a black-and-white music video on April 19, 2017. The visual was described by Pranav Trewn of Stereogum as "dark". "Quick Thought" received a music video on May 14, 2017. It was directed by Brandon Holmes. According to Peter Helman of Stereogum, the video features CupcakKe as the leader of a "colorful stick-up crew armed with bright red guns". "CPR" received a music video on May 29, 2017, and was performed live at Lollapalooza 2017 alongside Charli XCX. "Biggie Smalls" came out with a music video on June 16, 2017. "33rd" received a video on July 2, 2017. "Barcodes" received a music video on July 17, 2017. "Scraps" received a music video on August 8, 2017.

== Critical reception ==
Professional ratings
Review scores
Source	Rating
Pitchfork	7.6/10
Vice (Expert Witness)	B+

Pitchfork writer Briana Younger wrote of the album thus: "The amazingly explicit Chicago rapper has begun to embody the totality of her experience on record. Social issues, violence, and wild sex are all approached with the same fiery conviction."

The album was included on Rolling Stone's "40 Best Rap Albums of 2017" list at position 17.

== Track listing ==
Queen Elizabitch
No.	Title	Writer(s)	Producer(s)	Length
1.	"Scraps"	Elizabeth Eden Harris	Harris	3:24
2.	"33rd"	Harris	Def Starz	3:40
3.	"CPR"	Harris	Harris	3:28
4.	"Author"	Harris	Harris	3:24
5.	"Quick Thought"	Harris	Harris	3:25
6.	"Biggie Smalls"	Harris	Def Starz	3:51
7.	"Barcodes"	Harris	Def Starz	3:01
8.	"Cumshot"	Harris	Def Starz	3:29
9.	"Civilized"	Harris	Harris	3:01
10.	"Toys "R" Us"	Harris	Harris	2:29
11.	"Tarzan"	Harris	Harris	3:05
12.	"Reality, Pt. 4"	Harris	Harris	2:34
Total length:				38:52
