= Eden (Cupcakke album) =

Studio album by Cupcakke
- Released: November 9, 2018
- Recorded: 2018
- Genre: Hip-hop
- Length: 33:44
- Label: Self-released
- Producer: Def Starz; Mike Kalombo; Turreekk

Cupcakke chronology
Ephorize (2018)	Eden (2018)	Dauntless Manifesto (2024)

Singles from Eden
- 1. "Quiz" Released: April 27, 2018; 2. "Blackjack" Released: August 3, 2018

Eden is the fourth studio album by American rapper Cupcakke, released on November 9, 2018. It is Cupcakke's second album of 2018, following January's Ephorize. It includes the singles "Quiz" and "Blackjack".

== Background ==
The album follows CupcakKe's announcement and subsequent of her plans to tour with Iggy Azalea on her Bad Girls Tour, which was later canceled after Azalea's then-management failed to pay the promised $330,000 for the tour. Cupcakke then announced that she would be going on her own tour after her album is released.

== Promotion ==
Cupcakke announced the album on Instagram, along with sharing a picture of herself covered in chocolate sauce and sprinkles while eating a strawberry, which was revealed to be the cover art.

== Critical reception ==
Professional ratings
Aggregate scores
Source	Rating
Metacritic	77/100
Review scores
Source	Rating
Pitchfork	7.9/10
Vice (Expert Witness)	(3-star Honorable Mention)

On Metacritic, the album has a score of 77, indicating "generally favorable reviews" based on five reviews. Ani Blum of Pitchfork rated the album 7.9 out of 10 and called its songs "slathered in sex", writing: "Each track on Eden propels into the next, and her flow stays tight, whether she's cooing or shouting. It is a masterclass in control." Blum ended the review by complimenting Cupcakke's ability to go "from a condemnation of police brutality in one minute to a line about a dick the size of Ariana Grande's ponytail in the next. That ability to blend the real and the absurd, the cartoon and the corporeal, distinguishes CupcakKe from any other rapper."

== Track listing ==
Eden track listing
No.	Title	Writer(s)	Producer(s)	Length
1.	"PetSmart"	Elizabeth Eden Harris; Mike Kalombo	Kalombo	3:37
2.	"Cereal and Water"	Harris; Omer Agca	Turreekk	2:58
3.	"Quiz"	Harris; Agca	Turreekk	2:18
4.	"Garfield"	Harris; Domagoj Knezović	Def Starz	3:37
5.	"Dangled"	Harris; Kalombo	Kalombo	2:59
6.	"Starbucks"	Harris; Knezović	Def Starz	2:35
7.	"Typo"	Harris; Agca	Turreekk	2:30
8.	"Prenup"	Harris; Knezović	Def Starz	3:25
9.	"Blackjack"	Harris; Andre Robertson; Yusef El	Bizness Boi	3:12
10.	"Fabric"	Harris; Agca	Turreekk	2:21
11.	"Don't Post Me"	Harris; Agca	Turreekk	2:14
12.	"A.U.T.I.S.M"	Harris; Agca	Turreekk	1:58
Total length:				33:44

Notes

- "A.U.T.I.S.M" is stylized as "A U T I S M" on some digital streaming platforms.
