= Cum Cake =

2016 mixtape by Cupcakke

Mixtape by Cupcakke
- Released: February 9, 2016
- Length: 43:49
- Label: Self-release; TuneCore
- Producer: SeeMaple; Jay Cross; Energy Brooks; Jmoney; Truda; Elizabeth Eden Harris; Def Starz; Prohibeo

Cupcakke chronology
Cum Cake (2016)	S.T.D (Shelters to Deltas) (2016)

Singles from Cum Cake
- 1. "Vagina" Released: October 9, 2015; 2. "Deepthroat" Released: November 17, 2015; 3. "Juicy Coochie" Released: January 27, 2016

Cum Cake is the first mixtape by American rapper Cupcakke. It was released on February 9, 2016, independently through TuneCore. The first single, "Vagina", was released on October 9, 2015, and achieved viral popularity the same year. "Deepthroat" and "Juicy Coochie" were later-released singles along with "Tit for Tat", "Exceptions", and "Pedophile". The mixtape was listed in Rolling Stone's December 2016 40 Best Rap Albums of 2016.

== Track listing ==
All tracks are written by Elizabeth Eden Harris.

Cum Cake – standard edition
No.	Title	Producer(s)	Length
1.	"Vagina"	SeeMaple	3:26
2.	"Search"	Jay Cross	3:06
3.	"Pedophile"	Energy Brooks	2:16
4.	"Yo Lost"	Jmoney	4:39
5.	"Deepthroat"	SeeMaple	3:19
6.	"Life"	Truda	3:55
7.	"Exceptions"	SeeMaple	3:05
8.	"Reality, Pt. 2"		1:58
9.	"Darling"		3:00
10.	"Furniture"	Scrillogy	2:06
11.	"Image"		3:21
12.	"Pinocchio"	SeeMaple	1:48
13.	"Tit for Tat"	Def Starz	2:12
14.	"Diss"	Prohibeo	2:45
15.	"Juicy Coochie"	Energy Brooks	2:43
Total length:			43:49

Cum Cake – SoundCloud edition
No.	Title	Producer(s)	Length
1.	"Vagina"	SeeMaple	3:26
2.	"Search"	Jay Cross	3:06
3.	"Pedophile"	Energy Brooks	2:16
4.	"Yo Lost"	Jmoney	4:39
5.	"Deepthroat"	SeeMaple	3:19
6.	"Life"	Truda	3:55
7.	"Exceptions"	SeeMaple	3:05
8.	"Reality, Pt. 1"		1:33
9.	"Reality, Pt. 2"		1:58
10.	"Jumpman (Remix)"		2:25
11.	"Darling"		3:00
12.	"Hot Nigga Freestyle"		2:16
13.	"Furniture"	Scrillogy	2:06
14.	"Image"		3:21
15.	"Pinocchio"	SeeMaple	2:12
16.	"Chiraq (Remix)"		1:41
17.	"Tit for Tat"	Def Starz	2:45
18.	"Kash Doll Diss"	Prohibeo	2:45
19.	"Juicy Coochie"	Energy Brooks	2:43
Total length:			51:42
