= Ek Se Badhkar Ek =

Ek Se Badhkar Ek (transl. one greater than the next – transl. tit-for-tat in Hindi) may refer to:

- Ek Se Badhkar Ek (1976 film), a 1976 Indian Hindi-language film
- Ek Se Badhkar Ek (2004 film), a 2004 Indian Hindi-language film by Kundan Shah
- Ek Se Badkar Ek, a 1995 Indian television show
- Ek Se Badhkar Ek (TV series), a 2008 Indian music and dancing competition television series that aired on Zee TV
- Ek Se Badhkar Ek - Chota Packet Bada Dhamaka, an Indian reality TV series

== See also ==
- Tit for Tat (disambiguation)
