= Deepthroat (song) =

2015 single by Cupcakke

Single by Cupcakke

from the album Cum Cake
- Released: November 17, 2015
- Genre: Dirty rap
- Length: 3:19
- Songwriter: Elizabeth Harris
- Producer: SeeMaple

Cupcakke singles chronology
"Vagina" (2015)	"Deepthroat" (2015)	"Juicy Coochie" (2016)

"Deepthroat" (also released as "CupcakKe Deepthroat") is a song by American rapper Cupcakke, released on November 17, 2015 as the second single from her first mixtape Cum Cake (2016). Along with her song "Vagina", it propelled her to fame through going viral online. The title of the song refers to a type of fellatio.

== Background ==
After her debut single "Vagina" gained viral attention, Cupcakke composed and released "Deepthroat", which achieved greater popularity on the Internet. Like most of her songs, "Deepthroat" contains sexually explicit lyrics; she particularly uses metaphors related to eating food. The music video of the song became viral on YouTube, WorldStarHipHop and Facebook, leading to Cupcakke's rise to prominence.

== Music video ==
The music video reached 23 million views on YouTube, before it was removed in March 2018 for violating the policy on sexual content. Cupcakke demanded the video to be put back on YouTube, which was eventually done.

== Impact ==
In September 2019, when Cupcakke announced a retirement on Instagram Live, she stated she felt as though she was "corrupting the youth" as she had seen young children singing along to her explicit songs, referring to "Deepthroat" as an example.

In April 2021, Cupcakke claimed on Twitter that the song influenced the modern generation of female rappers in regard to sexually explicit music. The comment was met with strong disagreement from some fans.

== Certifications ==
Region	Certification	Certified units/sales
New Zealand (RMNZ)	Gold	15,000^{‡}
United States (RIAA)	Gold	500,000^{‡}
^{‡} Sales+streaming figures based on certification alone.
