= Squidward Nose =

2019 single by CupcakKe

Single by Cupcakke
- Released: January 11, 2019
- Genre: Dirty rap
- Length: 3:11
- Producer: Def Starz

Cupcakke singles chronology
"Dangled" (2018)	"Squidward Nose" (2019)	"Bird Box" (2019)

Music video
- "Squidward Nose" on YouTube

"Squidward Nose" is a song by American rapper Cupcakke. It was independently released on January 11, 2019. The song refers to the character Squidward Tentacles from the Nickelodeon TV series SpongeBob SquarePants.

In the song, Cupcakke laments her sexual partner, saying, "His dick smaller than my toes / I'd rather ride Squidward nose." The song received attention through TikTok for its raunchy lyrics.

== Background ==
The song was originally planned to be called "Pinocchio Nose" but Cupcakke changed the character to Squidward when she realized Pinocchio is a child.

== Music video ==
A music video was released on February 21, 2019, and features comedian John Early. The music video features Cupcakke as a siren and Early as a diver. Squidward also appears at the end, where Cupcakke ends up riding his nose as stated in the lyrics.

== Reception ==
MTV News posted a somewhat nonplussed response to the video, calling it "equal parts SpongeBob SquarePants and sex". The singer is "immediately over the top from the opening moments... her half-laugh/half-smile expression lets you know that you're in for a wild ride." In closing, they say, "With this kind of work ethic and commitment to risqué subject matters, there's literally no telling what the rapper could be planning next."
