= Duck Duck Goose (song) =

Song by Cupcakke

from the album Ephorize
- Released: January 5, 2018
- Genre: Dirty rap
- Length: 3:13
- Label: Self-released
- Songwriters: Elizabeth Eden Harris; Domagoj Knezović
- Producer: Def Starz

"Duck Duck Goose" is a song by independent American rapper Cupcakke from her third studio album Ephorize, released January 5, 2018.

== Background ==
The song was first released on the album Ephorize. She announced that the video would be released when she accumulated 300,000 followers on her Twitter.

== Composition ==
"Duck Duck Goose" has been described as a sex rap song that "flirts with New Orleans bounce". According to XXL, it "features a synthy, pop-infused instrumental, the sound of CupcakKe's mock orgasms and the brand of cartoonish sexuality that thrust the ascendant Windy City artist into the spotlight two years ago. 'I thought I came but I peed on the dick/Pubic hair got inches, that's weave on the dick/Pussy like a tree, it got leaves on the shit/Bang bang this pussy, Chief Keef with the dick,' she spits, a nod to the For the Dick Challenge." Vulture called it "pure porno slapstick: 'Coochie guaranteed to put you to sleep so damn soon / Riding on that dick, I'm reading Goodnight Moon.'" Genius stated that the song "transforms the classic childhood game into a explicit venture" and Stereogum dubbed it as a "good-natured sex-rap".

"It's the adult game of duck duck goose," she says. "This is how the adults play it. Kids, stay in school and keeps tapping the heads of real human beings. Don't do what I'm doing kids, it's an adult game."

—Harris playfully discussing the idea in "Duck Duck Goose"

== Promotion ==
After getting 300,000 followers on her Twitter account, the music video was released on January 15, 2018 on Martin Luther King Jr. Day. Genius released a video with the rapper explaining the lyrics of the song.

The song was briefly played in the 2019 romantic-comedy film Jexi.

== Music video ==
According to The Fader, the "visual features the Chicago rapper showing off an extensive collection of dildos as well as a souvenir Statue of Liberty. It's pretty wild and definitely one to watch outside of office hours." Lauren O'Neill from Noisey wrote: "The video is both liberated and liberating... Her fearlessness and uninhibited nature make her an excellent role model, and it's people like her who are changing conversations about bodies and sex for the better." Spin commented that "the video is lightly pornographic and very playful". Stereogum added that "cupcakKe plays with a wide assortment of dildos and wears pasties that look like ducklings."

On March 20, 2018, the video for the song was removed from YouTube for "violating YouTube's policy on nudity or sexual content". It was later put back up, with a representative from YouTube stating, "[with] the massive volume of videos on our site, sometimes we make the wrong call". The rapper criticized the website for removing the video stating, "One more and my entire channel is gone," and tried to bring attention to the matter by "[re-tweeting] numerous fans demanding that YouTube re-upload the clips."
