= Discounts (song) =

2020 single by Cupcakke

Single by Cupcakke
- Released: June 26, 2020
- Genre: Hip hop
- Length: 2:56
- Label: Self-released
- Songwriter: Elizabeth Harris
- Producer: Fantom

Cupcakke singles chronology
"Lemon Pepper" (2020)	"Discounts" (2020)	"Elephant" (2020)

Music video
- "Discounts" on YouTube

"Discounts" is a song by American rapper Cupcakke. She independently released it as a single on June 26, 2020. It became her first charting single, debuting at number 10 on the Billboard Digital Songs component chart. The song received critical acclaim from music critics, who praised the production, vocal performance, solo songwriting and maturity.

== Background and composition ==
"Discounts" and its precursor "Lemon Pepper" were released not long after Cupcakke's hiatus of late 2019. She announced her retirement after being disappointed with "corrupting the youth" with her hypersexualized music. After two months, Cupcakke returned to social media writing "Jesus fasted for 40 days... and so did I."

In the Fantom-produced song, Cupcakke name-drops Azealia Banks and Megan Thee Stallion, and references Cardi B's bruised forehead after attempting to physically attack Nicki Minaj at NYFW 2018.

== Music video ==
After announcing it earlier that month, the video titled "Discounts" (The Movie), was officially released on July 28, 2020.

In it, CupcakKe is working at a grocery store and chatting with a male friend when a rude customer interrupts her. She starts rapping as the scene flips between the store and a house where she is counting money with her crew. Mothers (some wearing COVID masks) and their kids are shown shopping for food before closing time. Finally, she is robbed at gunpoint and believes the lady who didn't get a discount at the store sent her boys in. She grabs a pair of assault rifles from beneath the counter and fires at the masked robbers.

A new scene shows CupcakKe in a red room with neon letters "Drunk in Love" on the wall. Leather dominates the furniture and clothing. A more revealing strapless top shows the tattoos above her breasts and parts of her midriff. The rap continues as CupcakKe gets into a series of firefights with the masked men in the store. It concludes with her sneaking up behind one of them and knocking him out.

== Reception ==
"Discounts" received acclaim from critics. Critics described the song as "fierce" "fiery", and "bold". Jessica McKinney of Complex highlighted her "witty wordplay and rapid delivery". BrooklynVegan wrote, "CupcakKe remains prolific [...] She goes hard on this one".

== Charts ==
Chart (2020)	Peak position
Scottish Singles Sales (Official Charts)	70
UK Singles Downloads (Official Charts)	78
US Digital Song Sales (Billboard)	10
US R&B/Hip-Hop Digital Song Sales (Billboard)	6
US Rap Digital Song Sales (Billboard)	5
