= Cupcakke =

American rapper (born 1997)

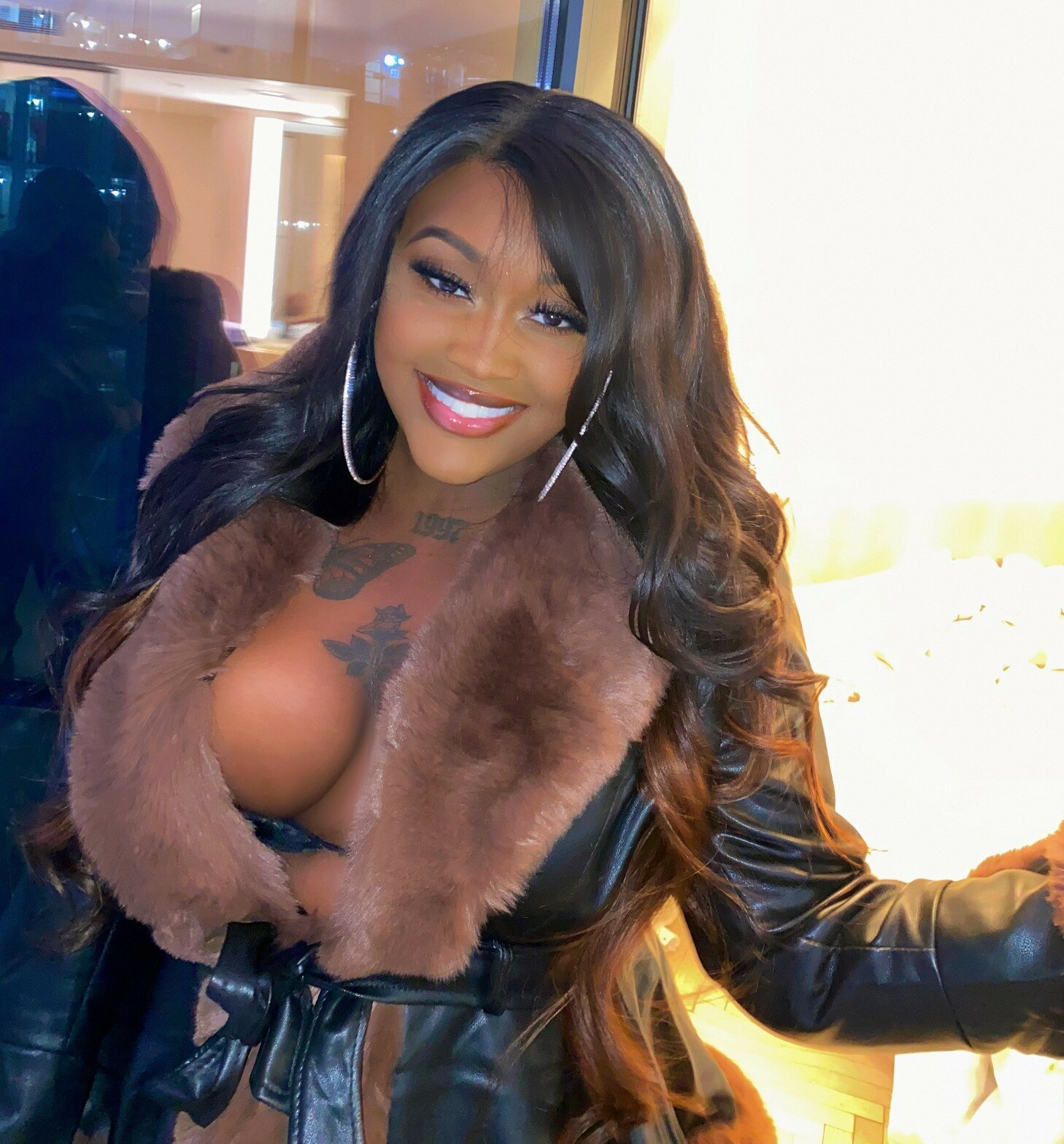
- Cupcakke in 2022

Background information
- Born: Elizabeth Eden Harris; May 31, 1997 (age 29); Chicago, Illinois, U.S.
- Genres: Hip-hop; dirty rap
- Occupations: Rapper; singer; songwriter
- Years active: 2012–present
- Website: cupcakke.net

Elizabeth Eden Harris (born May 31, 1997), known professionally as Cupcakke (often stylized as cupcakKe or CupcakKe; pronounced "cupcake"), is an American rapper and singer-songwriter known for her hypersexualized, brazen, and often comical persona and music.

Born in Chicago, Illinois, Cupcakke began her career as a rapper in 2012 by releasing material online. She drew attention in 2015 when she released two music videos, "Vagina" and "Deepthroat", on YouTube that went viral; the songs were later included on her debut mixtape, Cum Cake (2016), which was included on Rolling Stone's list of the Best Rap Albums of 2016 at number 23. A second mixtape, S.T.D (Shelters to Deltas), released in 2016, preceded her studio albums: Audacious (2016), Queen Elizabitch (2017), Ephorize (2018), and Eden (2018).

Aside from a brief retirement at the end of 2019, Cupcakke has been steadily releasing standalone singles, such as "Squidward Nose" (2019), "Discounts" (2020), "Mosh Pit" (2021), and "H2hoe" (2022). After 6 years since her last full-length release she released her fifth studio album Dauntless Manifesto (2024). Her sixth studio album, The Bakkery (2025), followed the year after.

== Early life ==
Elizabeth Eden Harris was born on May 31, 1997, in Chicago, Illinois, and was raised on King Drive, near Parkway Gardens. Harris was raised by a single mother and spent nearly four years in Chicago's homeless shelters starting at age seven. In the lyrics of her song "Ace Hardware", Harris recounts her experiences struggling with depression and being raped by her father, who is a pastor. She has referred to her father as a "deadbeat", "con artist", and "child molester." She attended Dulles Elementary School with other established Chicago rappers such as Lil Reese and Chief Keef. She got an early start into music and poetry at the age of ten by her involvement in her local church. It was also there that she got her start in performing, where she would perform for her local pastors by reciting poetry about her Christianity and faith.

When she was 13, she met a fellow churchgoer who encouraged her to turn the poetry into rap music, and she became infatuated with the art form. She cites 50 Cent, Lil' Kim, and Da Brat as early influences to her musical style.

== Career ==
=== 2012–2016: Early output, Cum Cake, S.T.D (Shelters to Deltas), and Audacious ===
Harris released her first music video, "Gold Digger" onto her official YouTube channel around 2012. She was around 14-15 at the time of its release. The original video has since been deleted. Over the next few years, she continued to release original music, as well as freestyles using beats from other artists through her YouTube channel, where she has amassed over 1.2 million subscribers.

In October 2015, the official music video for her song "Vagina" was released on YouTube via YMCFilmz. According to Cupcakke, she wrote the song because she was inspired by Khia's dirty rap song "My Neck, My Back (Lick It)" from 2002. One month later, Harris released "Deepthroat" on her own channel. Within weeks, the two videos went viral on YouTube, Worldstar, and Facebook. The songs later became singles for Harris' debut mixtape, Cum Cake, which was released in February 2016. Its release was also supported by further singles such as "Juicy Coochie", "Tit for Tat", and "Pedophile". A writer for Pitchfork, which included it on "9 Rap Mixtapes You Might Have Missed This Year", called the mixtape a "well rounded introduction to a skilled writer" and said it used songs "about love, loss, and hardship with its more explicit tracks to create a full profile of the up-and-coming Chicago rapper". "Pedophile" was also specifically noted for its "blunt commentary" on sexual assault.

In June 2016, Harris released her second mixtape, S.T.D (Shelters to Deltas). It was preceded by the single "Best Dick Sucker". Other tracks, such as "Doggy Style" and "Motherlands", were also later released as singles. The mixtape was listed among Rolling Stone's "Best Rap Albums of 2016 So Far".

In October 2016, Harris released her debut studio album, Audacious. The album was preceded by the single "Picking Cotton", which was described by MTV News as "a protest song about racist cops". Other tracks on the album such as "Spider-Man Dick" and "LGBT" were accompanied by music videos. In an interview Harris stated that she made the song "LGBT" "...strictly for the gay community to know that they are loved and don't need to feel judged."

=== 2017–2018: Queen Elizabitch, Ephorize and Eden ===
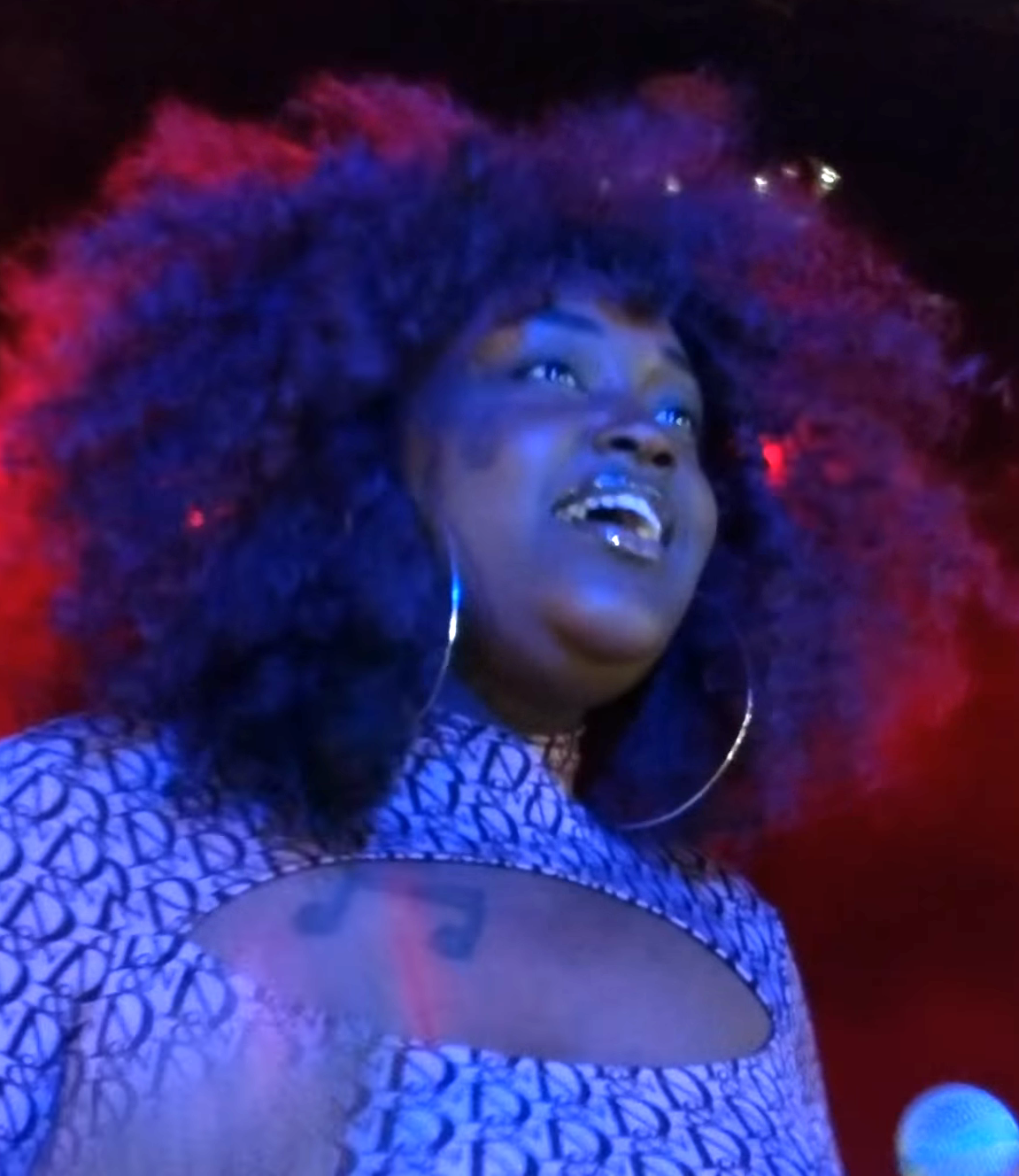
Cupcakke in 2018

In February 2017, Harris released "Cumshot", which served as the lead single to her second studio album. On March 7, English singer-songwriter Charli XCX premiered her song "Lipgloss", which featured Harris. The song was later included on XCX's mixtape, Number 1 Angel, which was released on March 10.

Her second studio album, titled Queen Elizabitch, was released on March 31, 2017. The Fader described it as "the type of nasty rap that made her a viral sensation, alongside all-out pop bangers like '33rd' and the confessional a cappella freestyle 'Reality, Pt. 4'." Stereogum also noted that the album "sees CupcakKe engaging with the current political climate and radio trends in a way that could help her cross over to a more mainstream audience".

On April 7, 2017, Queen Elizabitch was removed from online streaming services and digital music stores due to an illegal backing track that Harris had purchased from what she described as a "shady producer". She soon announced on Twitter that Queen Elizabitch would be re-released on April 16. She then released the singles "Exit" and "Cartoons" in November 2017.

Her third studio album, Ephorize, was released on January 5, 2018. Exclaim! called it "her most polished work to date" and noted that "she still slides in plenty of deliciously dirty one-liners throughout the new record." HotNewHipHop commented that "Ephorize might be one of the most introspective bodies of work she's dropped off to date." Pitchfork called it Cupcakke's "best album yet, with terrific production and a barrage of raps that reveal Elizabeth Harris to be far more than her hilarious and absurdly raunchy one-liners." She released music videos for the songs "Duck Duck Goose" and "Fullest". The former features her "showing off an extensive collection of dildos as well as a souvenir Statue of Liberty."

On November 9, 2018, Harris released her fourth studio album, Eden. She released music videos for the lead single "Quiz", and for the following singles "Hot Pockets" and "Blackjack".

=== 2019–2023: Hiatus and standalone singles ===
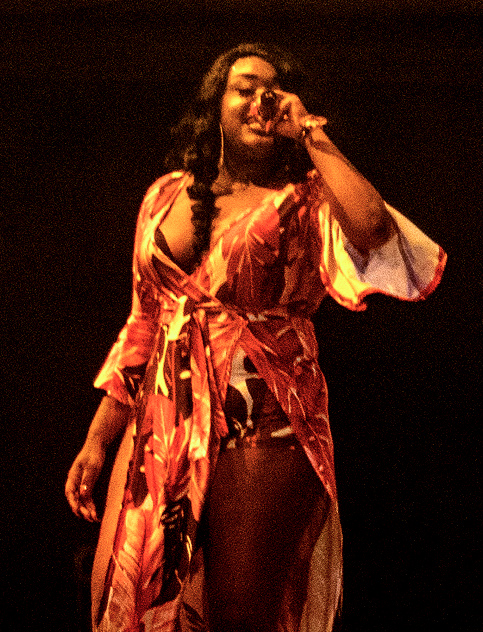
Cupcakke at Primavera Sound in 2019

On January 8, 2019, Harris was reportedly taken to a hospital in Chicago after tweeting that she was going to commit suicide. In a tweet posted the next day, Harris wrote "I've been fighting with depression for the longest. Sorry that I did it public last night but I'm ok. I went to the hospital & I'm finally getting the help that I need to get through, be happy, & deliver great music. Thanks for all the prayers but please don't worry bout me."

On January 11, 2019, the single "Squidward Nose" was released, and on February 21, a music video for the song featuring John Early premiered. On April 17, 2019, Harris released a remix of Lil Nas X's song "Old Town Road", titled "Old Town Hoe", on her YouTube channel, and its music video the following day.

In September 2019, Harris made several posts on social media criticizing several artists such as Camila Cabello (she accused Cabello of racism) and Shawn Mendes, followed by her retirement announcement in an Instagram Live video. She stated, "This live is going to be the last video that y'all [will] see of me. I am completely done with music". She said that she would no longer be releasing music to the public and that she would be removing her music from all streaming platforms. She stated that she was disturbed to see children in videos and young people at her shows singing along to her explicit songs, and felt she was corrupting the youth with her raunchy songs. Harris also told fans that she has a "very bad gambling addiction" and that she had lost $700,000 at a casino in September 2018. Harris' Instagram and Twitter accounts were deactivated after the livestream ended. Her music remained available on streaming platforms.

On November 7, 2019, Harris came out of retirement after a 40-day absence on all social media platforms with a tweet; "Jesus fasted for 40 days & so did I...... Nov 16th". On March 6, 2020, Harris released a new single, "Lawd Jesus". Harris uploaded her first video to YouTube since her previous deletion of all videos on her channel the previous year, with the double video for singles "Grilling Niggas" and "Lawd Jesus", on May 13, 2020.

On June 1, 2020, Cupcakke released the single "Lemon Pepper" with half of the proceeds going towards the Minnesota Bail fund. Another single, "Discounts" was released on June 26. The song received critical acclaim, peaking at number 78 on the UK Singles Downloads Chart and number 80 on the UK Singles Sales Chart, becoming her first single to do so. "Discounts" also reached number one on the US iTunes chart, which is her first song to do so. She is also the only female rapper to have a number-one song on the iTunes chart with no label.

On December 16, 2020, Harris received significant media attention after releasing "How to Rob (Remix)", a diss track. It was released on YouTube and sees Harris take aim at Megan Thee Stallion, Lizzo, and Lil' Kim, among others. The song received positive reviews.

On March 1, 2021, "Deepthroat" was certified Gold by the Recording Industry Association of America (RIAA), which denotes five hundred thousand units based on sales and track-equivalent on-demand streams. It is her first song to be certified by the RIAA. In June, Rolling Stone magazine reported that Harris will be co-hosting the upcoming OutTV reality show Hot Haus with Tiffany Pollard, which will mark the rapper's TV hosting debut. Harris said of the casting decision, "As soon as I heard what this show stood for, owning your sexuality and talent, I knew I had to be involved."

Later that same year, her songs went viral on TikTok, mainly in the form of remixes; she later joined the platform because of it to promote her single 'Marge Simpson'.

On May 31, 2022, Harris released the singles "Good Puss (Remix)" with Cobrah, "PTPOM (Shemix)" with Tay Money & ShantiiP, "H2Hoe", and "HDBG (Shemix)" with Erica Banks and Tweeday, in release order. In December, she would jokingly get her lawyers to combat cupcakKe remixes.

Within 2023, she would release two more songs before her return in 2024, both being "Lizzo Shemix" with Layton Greene & Moone Walker, and "ABRACADABRA" with Borgore and Chase Icon.

=== 2024–present: Dauntless Manifesto and The Bakkery ===
On June 23, 2024, Harris announced her fifth studio album, Dauntless Manifesto, marking her return to the industry after a six-year hiatus from full-length projects. Released independently on June 28, 2024, the album was a critical success. Lucas Martins of Beats Per Minute praised its diversity in "flows, production, and genre," while Sam Franzini of Clash described the work as "dizzying" and "consistently surprising." Fernando García of Jenesaispop highlighted the balance of sexually charged lyrics with a "strong conviction for social justice," specifically citing "Dementia" and "Grilling Niggas II" as standouts. While Anthony Fantano offered a more mixed review, noting that the serious moments sometimes felt "out of place" against her established lyrical "script," Arthur Diaz of SLUG deemed it her "most thoughtful project." Singles such as "Backstage Passes" and "Little Red Riding Good" achieved significant viral popularity on TikTok.

To support the release, Harris embarked on the Dauntless Manifesto Tour. The tour featured three legs: the first two spanned the United States and Canada, while the third extended to the United Kingdom, Ireland, and Norway, concluding on January 22, 2025. This was followed by the CupcakKe Live tour, which ran in two parts from March to May and August to December 2025.

On June 9, 2025, Harris released "One of My Bedbugs Ate My Pussy" as the lead single for her sixth studio album, The Bakkery. Announced on October 17 and released on October 24, 2025, the album was noted for its genre fluidity, incorporating elements of hip house, hyperpop, afrobeats, and electropop. Critics from Legends Will Never Die praised the project as her most "hilariously written" work, showcasing a "sharpened witty pen" that examined power, money, and body politics through the lens of desire.

The album's reception was largely positive, appearing on several "Best Albums of 2025" lists. Acclaimed tracks included the 2000s-inspired "Alcoholic," the hip house-influenced "UFO," and the rap-heavy "Ballerina Coupe" and "Akeelah." The song "Moan-a Lisa" was specifically lauded by fans for its vocal performance and production. In February 2026, Harris launched The Bakkery Tour, which achieved major commercial success, selling out every date across its North American run through April 2026.

== Philanthropy ==
In mid-2024, Harris donated approximately $15,000 to the Palestine Children's Relief Fund with the aim of providing aid and raising awareness about human rights violations in Gaza, as well as showing solidarity with Palestinian organizations. Following the release of the album "The Bakkery", Harris spoke out about the lack of mainstream media coverage of humanitarian situations in Palestine and the Congo.

== Discography ==
=== Studio albums ===
List of studio albums, with selected chart positions, sales, and certifications
| Title | Album details | Peak chart positions | | |
| Title | Album details | US Heat | US Indie | NZ Heat |
|---|---|---|---|---|
| Audacious | Released: October 14, 2016; Label: Self-released; Formats: Digital download, streaming | — | — | — |
| Queen Elizabitch | Released: March 31, 2017; Label: Self-released; Formats: Digital download, streaming | — | — | — |
| Ephorize | Released: January 5, 2018; Label: Self-released; Formats: CD, digital download, streaming | 2 | 18 | 6 |
| Eden | Released: November 9, 2018; Label: Self-released; Format: Digital download, streaming | — | — | — |
| Dauntless Manifesto | Released: June 28, 2024; Label: Self-released; Formats: Digital download, streaming | — | — | — |
| The Bakkery | Released: October 24, 2025; Label: Self-released; Formats: Digital download, streaming | — | — | — |

=== Mixtapes ===
List of mixtapes, with selected details
| Title | Album details |
|---|---|
| Cum Cake | Released: February 9, 2016; Label: Self-released; Formats: Digital download, streaming |
| S.T.D (Shelters to Deltas) | Released: June 19, 2016; Label: Self-released; Formats: Digital download, streaming |

=== Singles ===
==== As lead artist ====
List of singles as lead artist, with selected chart positions and certifications
| Title | Year | Peak chart positions | | | | Certifications | Album |
| Title | Year | US Dig. | US R&B/HH Dig. | SCO | UK Down. | Certifications | Album |
|---|---|---|---|---|---|---|---|
| "Vagina" | 2015 | — | — | — | — | | Cum Cake |
| "Deepthroat" | 2015 | — | — | — | — | RIAA: Gold | Cum Cake |
| "Juicy Coochie" | 2016 | — | — | — | — | | Cum Cake |
| "Best Dick Sucker" | 2016 | — | — | — | — | | S.T.D (Shelters to Deltas) |
| "Panda (Remix)" | 2016 | — | — | — | — | | S.T.D (Shelters to Deltas) |
| "Picking Cotton" | 2016 | — | — | — | — | | Audacious |
| "Cumshot" | 2017 | — | — | — | — | | Queen Elizabitch |
| "Biggie Smalls" | 2017 | — | — | — | — | | Queen Elizabitch |
| "Exit" | 2017 | — | — | — | — | | Ephorize |
| "Cartoons" | 2017 | — | — | — | — | | Ephorize |
| "Quiz" | 2018 | — | — | — | — | | Eden |
| "Hot Pockets" | 2018 | — | — | — | — | | Non-album single |
| "Blackjack" | 2018 | — | — | — | — | | Eden |
| "Squidward Nose" | 2019 | — | — | — | — | | Non-album singles |
| "Bird Box" | 2019 | — | — | — | — | | Non-album singles |
| "Ayesha" | 2019 | — | — | — | — | | Non-album singles |
| "Whoregasm" | 2019 | — | — | — | — | | Non-album singles |
| "Grilling Niggas" | 2019 | — | — | — | — | | Non-album singles |
| "Lawd Jesus" | 2020 | — | — | — | — | | Non-album singles |
| "Lemon Pepper" | 2020 | — | — | — | — | | Non-album singles |
| "Discounts" | 2020 | 10 | 6 | 70 | 78 | | Non-album singles |
| "Elephant" | 2020 | — | — | — | — | | Non-album singles |
| "Gum" | 2020 | — | — | — | — | | Non-album singles |
| "How to Rob (Remix)" | 2020 | — | — | — | — | | Non-album singles |
| "The Gag Is" | 2020 | — | — | — | — | | Non-album singles |
| "Back in Blood (Remix)" | 2021 | — | — | — | — | | Non-album singles |
| "Mickey" | 2021 | — | — | — | — | | Non-album singles |
| "Mosh Pit" | 2021 | — | 10 | — | — | | Non-album singles |
| "Moonwalk" | 2021 | — | — | — | — | | Non-album singles |
| "Huhhhhh" | 2021 | — | — | — | — | | Non-album singles |
| "Marge Simpson" | 2021 | — | — | — | — | | Non-album singles |
| "PTPOM (Shemix)" (with Tay Money featuring ShantiiP) | 2022 | — | — | — | — | | Non-album singles |
| "We Go Up (Remix)" | 2022 | — | — | — | — | | Non-album singles |
| "H2hoe" | 2022 | — | — | — | — | | Non-album singles |
| "Grilling Niggas II" | 2024 | — | — | — | — | | Dauntless Manifesto |
| "One of My Bedbugs Ate My Pussy" | 2025 | — | — | — | — | | The Bakkery |
| "Ballerina Coupe" | 2025 | — | — | — | — | | The Bakkery |
| "That's Like" | 2026 | — | — | — | — | | Non-album single |
"—" denotes a recording that did not chart or was not released in that territory.

==== As featured artist ====
List of singles as featured artist
| Title | Year | Album |
|---|---|---|
| "Man Pussy" (M.A.N. II featuring Cupcakke) | 2016 | 204ever |
| "Cabbage (Remix) (Ladies and Fellas)" (ETSWHORE featuring Cupcakke) | 2016 | Non-album single |
| "Pu$$y Market" (Gumball Machine featuring Cupcakke) | 2016 | Professional Fame |
| "PÜ$$Y (RemiXXX)" (George G featuring Cupcakke) | 2016 | Non-album singles |
| "2 Bad Azz Bitches" (Brian Castle featuring Cupcakke) | 2016 | Non-album singles |
| "Situation" (Xavi Got Bars featuring Cupcakke) | 2016 | Non-album singles |
| "Trouble in Hollywood!" (Mise Darling featuring Cupcakke) | 2016 | Plastic Love |
| "Boy" (K.I.D. featuring Cupcakke) | 2017 | Poster Child |
| "Get Ya Shine On" (So Drove featuring Cupcakke, Kreayshawn and TT The Artist) | 2017 | Non-album singles |
| "Loverboy" (Nico Raimont featuring Cupcakke) | 2017 | Non-album singles |
| "Queens of the Streets" (Petey Plastic featuring Cupcakke) | 2017 | Non-album singles |
| "Lick You" (Dante Dcasso featuring Cupcakke) | 2017 | Non-album singles |
| "Party Like a Pornstar" (Jamez Hunter featuring Cupcakke) | 2017 | Non-album singles |
| "Like a Snapback" (Benzo Fly featuring Cupcakke) | 2018 | Different Mind State |
| "Drip" (Keiston featuring Osha So Gutta and Cupcakke) | 2018 | Elevated |
| "Falling Fast" (Tucker William featuring Cupcakke) | 2018 | Falling Fast – The Remixes |
| "Ass & Titties" (Kazzie featuring Cupcakke) | 2018 | Non-album singles |
| "School Night" (Greer featuring Cupcakke) | 2018 | Non-album singles |
| "No Fats, No Femmes" (Big Momma featuring Cupcakke) | 2018 | MILF |
| "Bitter Chocolate" (Sage Charmaine featuring Cupcakke) | 2018 | Non-album single |
| "Ripe" (Banoffee featuring Cupcakke) | 2020 | Look at Us Now Dad |
| "Shake Sum" (Kidd Kenn featuring Cupcakke) | 2020 | Child's Play |
| "Abc, S" (YBCKIDMELO featuring Cupcakke) | 2020 | Non-album singles |
| "Down" (MkX featuring Cupcakke) | 2020 | Non-album singles |
| "Good PusS (Remix)" (Cobrah featuring Cupcakke) | 2022 | Non-album singles |

=== Guest appearances ===
List of guest appearances
| Title | Year | Other artist(s) | Album |
|---|---|---|---|
| "Bad Kids" | 2016 | Uma Kompton | The Trial of Uma Kompton |
| "Lipgloss" | 2017 | Charli XCX | Number 1 Angel |
| "I Got It" | 2017 | Charli XCX, Brooke Candy, Pabllo Vittar | Pop 2 |
| "Iced Out Dick" | 2018 | Lil Phag | God Hates Lil Phag |
| "LMK (What's Really Good)" | 2018 | Kelela, Princess Nokia, Junglepussy, Ms. Boogie | Take Me a Part, the Remixes |
| "Splish Splash" | 2018 | DreamDoll | Life in Plastic 2 |
| "Safari Zone" | 2019 | Aja | BOX Office |
| "Shake It" | 2019 | Charli XCX, Big Freedia, Brooke Candy, Pabllo Vittar | Charli |

=== Music videos ===
List of music videos
| Title | Year |
|---|---|
| "Money"^{†} | 2012 |
| "Figgas Over Niggas"^{†} | 2012 |
| "Like a Playground"^{†} | 2013 |
| "Simple as That"^{†} | 2013 |
| "Yo Lost"^{†} | 2014 |
| "Reality"^{†} | 2014 |
| "Vagina"^{†} | 2015 |
| "Deepthroat"^{†} | 2015 |
| "Pedophile" | 2016 |
| "LGBT" | 2016 |
| "Picking Cotton"^{†} | 2016 |
| "Exceptions"^{†} | 2016 |
| "Best Dick Sucker"^{†} | 2016 |
| "Image"^{†} | 2016 |
| "Juicy Coochie"^{†} | 2016 |
| "Tit for Tat"^{†} | 2016 |
| "Spiderman Dick"^{†} | 2016 |
| "Motherlands"^{†} | 2016 |
| "Sweet n Low"^{†} | 2016 |
| "Doggy Style"^{†} | 2016 |
| "Interruption"^{†} | 2016 |
| "Opportunity"^{†} | 2016 |
| "Budget"^{†} | 2016 |
| "Homework"^{†} | 2017 |
| "33rd"^{†} | 2017 |
| "Quick Thought" | 2017 |
| "Reality Pt. 4"^{†} | 2017 |
| "Ace Hardware"^{†} | 2017 |
| "Exit"^{†} | 2017 |
| "Biggie Smalls"^{†} | 2017 |
| "Cumshot"^{†} | 2017 |
| "Barcodes"^{†} | 2017 |
| "CPR"^{†} | 2017 |
| "Scraps"^{†} | 2017 |
| "Mistress"^{†} | 2017 |
| "Cartoons"^{†} | 2017 |
| "Crayons"^{†} | 2018 |
| "Quiz" | 2018 |
| "Spoiled Milk Titties"^{†} | 2018 |
| "Dangled" | 2018 |
| "Fullest"^{†} | 2018 |
| "Duck Duck Goose"^{†} | 2018 |
| "Hot Pockets" | 2018 |
| "Blackjack" | 2018 |
| "Old Town Hoe (Old Town Road Remix)" | 2019 |
| "Crazy Story (Remix)"^{†} | 2019 |
| "Squidward Nose"^{†} | 2019 |
| "Whoregasm"^{†} | 2019 |
| "Bird Box" | 2019 |
| "Discounts" | 2020 |
| "Grilling Niggas/Lawd Jesus" | 2020 |
| "Who Run It"^{†} | 2020 |
| "Mosh Pit" | 2021 |
| "Mickey"^{†} | 2021 |
| "Marge Simpson" | 2021 |
| "Grilling Niggas II" | 2024 |
| "Ballerina Coupe" | 2025 |
| "UFO" | 2025 |
| "Alcoholic" | 2026 |
"†" denotes a music video that was deleted

As featured artist

List of music videos as featured artist
| Title | Year |
|---|---|
| "Pu$$y Market" (Gumball Machine featuring Cupcakke) | 2016 |
| "Situations" (Xavi Got Bars featuring Cupcakke) | 2016 |
| "Hood Rich" (Zacharian featuring Cupcakke) | 2016 |
| "2 Bad Azz Bitches" (Brian Castle featuring Cupcakke) | 2016 |
| "Ass and Titties" (Kazzie featuring Cupcakke) | 2018 |

== Tours ==
- The Marilyn Monhoe Tour (2017)
- The Ephorize Tour (2018)
- The Eden Tour (2018–2019)
- Cupcakke Live (2023)
- Dauntless Manifesto Tour (2024–25)
- CupcakKe Live (2025)

== See also ==
- Music of Illinois
