= The Red & Black (University of Georgia) =

Student newspaper serving the University of Georgia

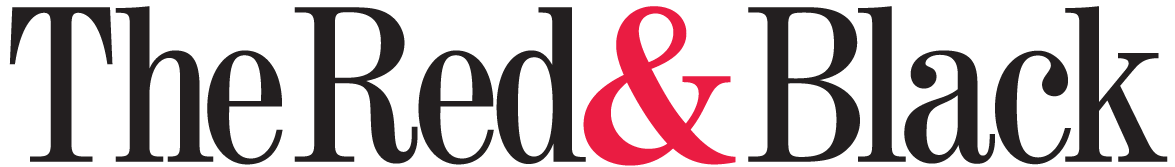

- The January 8, 2007 front page of The Red & Black
- Type: Student newspaper
- Format: Broadsheet
- Owner(s): The Red & Black Publishing Company, Inc.
- Publisher: Charlotte Norsworthy Varnum
- Founded: 1893
- Headquarters: 540 Baxter St. Athens, GA, 30605; United States
- Circulation: 10,000
- Website: redandblack.com

The Red & Black is an American independent, nonprofit weekly student newspaper serving the University of Georgia (UGA) in Athens, Georgia, updated daily on its website. Founded in 1893, the paper has operated independently of the university since 1980 and has received numerous national awards for collegiate journalism, including multiple Pacemaker Awards from the Associated Collegiate Press.

== History ==
Students published its first issue in tabloid format on November 24, 1893, from offices in the Academic Building on North Campus.

In the spring of 1895, the UGA faculty ordered that publication of the paper be discontinued; however, students revived the paper that fall as an independent venture with no oversight by the university. The private venture's success that Fall upset the faculty, and they took back control in January 1896 with the Athletic Association in charge of overseeing the paper.

Published weekly, The Red & Black was the official organ of the Athletic Council from 1896 to 1928. The paper advertised athletic competitions and reported on the culture of the university.

In 1928, the paper's administration moved under the Grady College of Journalism and Mass Communication as a laboratory for its students. It was being published semiweekly in 1968 when it changed to a broadsheet format and moved its offices to the new journalism building on campus.

In 1980, after numerous run-ins with the university's administrators, The Red & Black became independent of the university a second time, left to support itself through advertising. Its office moved off-campus, and its publication was directed by volunteer staff and student writers. In 1991, publication was expanded from four to five days a week.

Until fall of 2011, the paper had a Monday-to-Friday circulation of 17,000 during the academic year and was generally published in one section. Each Thursday, however, the paper produced a "Music Notes" section, which chronicled the local music scene and highlighted shows and festivals in Athens, and on Fridays during football season it published a "First & Goal" section providing in-depth coverage of the Georgia Bulldogs football team. During the summer session the paper published once a week, with a circulation of 8,500. The newspaper was awarded the Pacemaker Award in 2010 in both the newspaper and online categories, and was a newspaper Pacemaker finalist in 2009. It marks the fifth newspaper Pacemaker for The Red & Black, which it has previously won in 1935, 1937, 1941 and 1972.

=== Present day ===
On August 15, 2011, The Red & Black released a special edition announcing a shift in news distribution that it called "a media revolution." The paper's student managers announced that the periodical would primarily focus on its online content, to better keep up with demand for mobile news access. The paper is now published in a three-sectioned print version, which focuses on in-depth coverage. The website, which contains most of the newspaper's content, contains all of the features and articles previously found in the Monday-to-Friday paper, in addition to audio clips, videos, and other multimedia extras.

In 2019, The Red & Black won a Pacemaker award. The Red & Black was the national Mark of Excellence winner for 2019. In 2020, The Red & Black won a Pacemaker award. The Red & Black was the national Mark of Excellence winner for 2020. In 2020, The Red & Black won the Betty Gage Holland award. In October 2022, The Red & Black was recorded as having 211,696 total social media shares, making it the 8th student newspaper in terms of social engagement. It produced a total of 2,446 articles during the 2021/22 academic year.

In 2021, The Red & Black was named to the Associated Collegiate Press's Pacemaker 100, a list of the organization's top 100 Pacemaker-winning publications compiled for ACP's centennial; the recognition was presented at the Fall National College Media Convention in October 2022. The newspaper won the ACP Newspaper/Newsmagazine Pacemaker Award in 2024 and again in 2025, and won the ACP Online Pacemaker Award in 2026.

As of 2021, The Red & Black has an editorial staff, advertising staff, and professional staff. Within the editorial staff there are nine sections that correspond to different aspects of The Red & Black. The nine sections are news and enterprise, sports, culture, opinion, digital, photo, design, special publications, and training. Each section of the editorial staff has leadership positions. The editorial staff has three top leadership positions which are editor-in-chief, executive editor, and managing editor. The advertising staff has three top leadership positions which are student advertising manager, senior account executive, and account executive. The professional staff has four top leadership positions which are executive director, chief financial officer, creative services director, and newsroom adviser. The Red & Black operates as a 501(c)(3) nonprofit corporation and receives no funding or student activity fees from the university.

== 2012 walkout ==
On August 15, 2012, student editors and other staff at The Red & Black resigned, claiming interference by non-student managers. The paper's former editor-in-chief said The Red & Black had hired non-student employees "with veto power over students' decisions."

After a few days, the board of The Red & Black agreed to the students' demands for student editorial control without prior review. On August 20, the board released a statement saying the student editors and staff were returning to the newspaper. The editor-in-chief said the board had "met all the key points we asked for" and proved willing to listen.
