= TuneCore =

American independent digital music service

- Type: Public subsidiary
- Industry: Music
- Genre: Digital distribution Music publishing
- Founded: 2006
- Founder: Jeff Price, Gary Burke, Peter Wells
- Headquarters: New York City, U.S.
- Area served: Worldwide
- Key people: Matt Barrington (COO), Andreea Gleeson (CEO), Brian Miller (CRO), Lucy Huang (CTO & CPO)
- Products: Online Music Distribution; Music Publishing Administration
- Services: Open platform music distribution and publishing administration.
- Parent: Believe Music
- Website: www.tunecore.com

TuneCore is an American digital music distribution, publishing and licensing service founded in 2006. It has been a part of the French music company Believe Music since April 2015.

TuneCore distributes music through online retailers such as Deezer, Spotify, Amazon Music, Apple Music, Google Play, Tidal, Beatport and others. TuneCore also offers music publishing administration services, helping songwriters record their compositions and earn royalties internationally. TuneCore has been sued twice for copyright infringement; the first lawsuit was settled out of court, and the second is ongoing.

== History ==
=== Founding to 2014 ===
TuneCore was founded in 2006 by Jeff Price, Gary Burke, and Peter Wells.

TuneCore's first customer was Frank Black, lead singer of the Pixies. In December 2006, music instrument and equipment retailer Guitar Center bought a stake in TuneCore, giving the company access to the music retailer's customers.

In 2008, TuneCore was utilized by Nine Inch Nails to deliver the music from their album, Ghosts I–IV, to the Amazon MP3 store.

TuneCore fired Jeff Price, a co-founder and then-CEO, after the company faced a "cash-flow" crisis in 2012. Price has sued TuneCore for severance compensation and alleged that the company may have been insolvent, an accusation that the company appears to dispute.

=== Acquisition by Believe to present ===
TuneCore was acquired by Denis Ladegaillerie's Believe in April 2015. The acquisition opened up artists' access to Believe Digital's wider distribution network and label services. Both of the companies remained operationally separate, while jointly claiming to represent 25 to 30 percent of the new music uploaded to iTunes each day. After the acquisition, TuneCore and Believe used their newly increased leverage in negotiations with digital services including Spotify and Tidal to improve their services for their artists.

Also in 2015, TuneCore expanded its presence in the UK and Australia announcing dedicated websites, including localized currency and content for each region. It also introduced its YouTube Sound Recording service to collect revenue for artists when their sound recordings are used anywhere on YouTube.

In September 2015, TuneCore stepped up its live event offerings, throwing LA's independent music community its first ever Indie Artist Forum, focusing on educating and fostering collaboration amongst aspiring professional musicians while engaging on a dialog around the ins and outs of the current landscape of the independent music business.

On July 7, 2020, TuneCore expanded its presence in India announcing dedicated website including localized currency and content.

In 2021, Andreea Gleeson became the company's Chief Executive Officer.

In the United States, TuneCore represents approximately 10 percent of the 20 million songs on iTunes, and it accounts for almost 4 percent of all digital sales.

TuneCore has garnered media attention from ABC's World News Tonight, The Daily Mirror, and Pitchfork.

== Copyright fraud allegations ==
In multiple instances, TuneCore's services have been used to commit copyright fraud through online services like iTunes, Spotify, and YouTube. In 2019, Pitchfork reported that people had used independent distribution companies, including TuneCore, to upload unreleased tracks by Playboi Carti and Lil Uzi Vert to Spotify. Plays of these tracks resulted in revenue going to the uploaders rather than the original owners of the music. In 2020, TuneCore was sued by Round Hill Music for uploading and collecting revenue from iTunes for compositions owned by Round Hill. TuneCore and Round Hill Music later settled out of court. In November 2024, Universal Music Group, ABKCO Records, and Concord Music filed a lawsuit seeking $500 million in damages for TuneCore's distribution of copyright-infringing remixes of popular tracks.
