= Ashnikko discography =

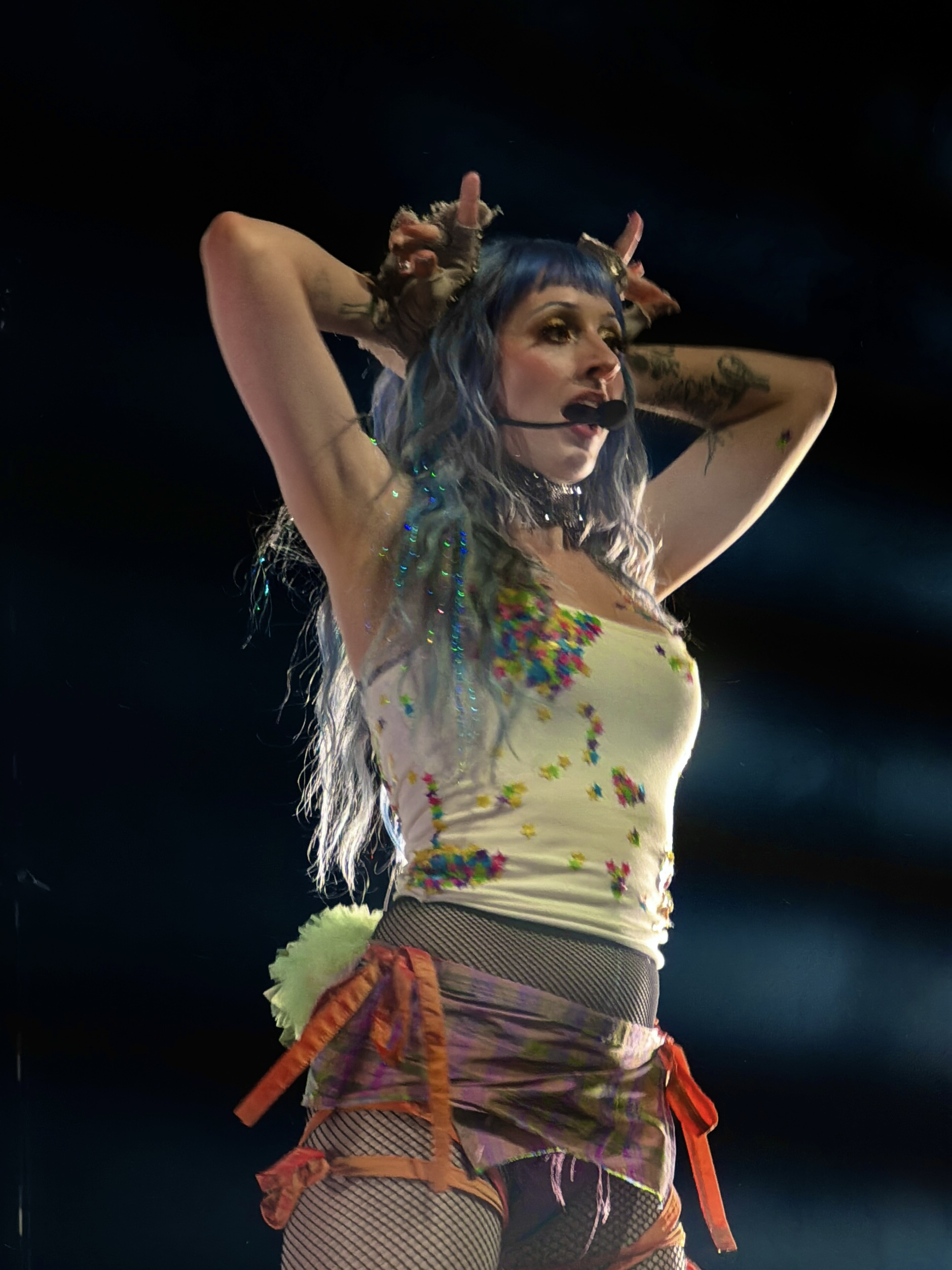
- Ashnikko performing at the Warfield Theatre during the Smoochies Tour in 2026
- Studio albums: 2
- EPs: 4
- Singles: 15
- Mixtapes: 1

Ashton Nicole Casey, professionally known as Ashnikko, has released two studio albums, one mixtape, four extended plays (EPs) and 15 singles (including four as a featured artist). Her first release was the single "Sass Pancakes" in 2017, which included 4 tracks. In 2018, she released an EP called Unlikeable, with 4 tracks, with "Blow" being the lead single. In 2019, she released the EP Hi, It's Me, with the track "Stupid" featuring Baby Tate becoming her first success, gaining popularity on the internet and achieving over 200 million streams.

In 2021, she broke into the mainstream with her mixtape Demidevil. Its most popular songs were: "Daisy" (over 500 million streams), "Deal with It" featuring Kelis (over 100 million streams) and "Slumber Party" (over 400 million streams). She also released a second version of "Daisy" called "Daisy 2.0", featuring the Vocaloid artist Hatsune Miku.

In 2023, she released her debut album, called Weedkiller, which has 13 tracks, featuring singles such as "Worms", "Cheerleader" and "You Make Me Sick!", which also had a remix by Dora Jar.

In 2024, she made a song for the Netflix series Arcane, called "Paint the Town Blue". She also released an EP with all of her "Halloweenie" songs, called Halloweenie I–IV, with 6 tracks.

In 2025, Ashnikko released her second studio album titled Smoochies, featuring singles such as "Itty Bitty", "Trinkets" and "Smoochie Girl".

During the pause between the albums, she released some singles and remixes: "Tantrum" (2020), "Daisy 2.0" featuring Hatsune Miku, the remixes with "Deal with It" (2021), the remixes with "Slumber Party" (2021), the single Panic Attacks in Paradise / Maggots (2021), which has the songs "Panic Attacks in Paradise" and "Maggots", "Carol of the Bells (Spotify Singles Holiday)" (2021), "Paint the Town Blue" (2024), the remixes with "Itty Bitty" (2025) and a feature with Victoria; "Daddy" (2025).

== Studio albums ==
List of studio albums, with details and peak chart positions
Title	Details	Peak chart positions							
Title	Details	US	AUS	BEL (FL)	GER	IRE	NZ	SCO	UK
Weedkiller	Released: August 25, 2023; Label: Parlophone, Warner; Format: Digital download, streaming, CD, LP, cassette	105	54	157	35	84	27	4	7
Smoochies	Released: October 17, 2025; Label: Parlophone, Warner; Format: Digital download, streaming, CD, LP, cassette	158	15	—	—	79	30	14	32
"—" denotes releases that did not chart, or charted on a subchart.

== Mixtapes ==
List of mixtape albums, with release date, label, certifications and peak chart positions shown
Title	Details	Peak chart positions						Certifications
Title	Details	US	AUS	CAN	IRE	SCO	UK	Certifications
Demidevil	Released: January 15, 2021; Label: Parlophone, Warner; Format: Digital download, streaming, CD, LP, cassette	107	46	89	69	9	19	BPI: Silver

== Extended plays ==
Title	Details
Sass Pancakes (with Raf Riley)	Released: March 17, 2017; Label: Digital Picnic, WMG; Format: Digital download, streaming
Unlikeable	Released: November 23, 2018; Label: Digital Picnic, Parlophone, WMG; Format: Digital download, streaming
Hi, It's Me	Released: July 12, 2019; Label: Digital Picnic, Parlophone, WMG; Format: Digital download, streaming, LP
Halloweenie I–VI	Released: October 11, 2024; Label: Parlophone, WMG; Format: Digital download, streaming, LP

== Singles ==
=== As lead artist ===
Title	Year	Peak chart positions										Certification	Album
Title	Year	US Bub.	US Alt. Airplay	US Pop	US Rock Airplay	AUS	CAN	IRE	NZ Hot	SCO	UK	Certification	Album
"Blow"	2018	—	—	—	—	—	—	—	—	—	—		Unlikeable
"Nice Girl"	2018	—	—	—	—	—	—	—	—	—	—		Unlikeable
"Invitation" (featuring Kodie Shane)	2018	—	—	—	—	—	—	—	—	—	—		Unlikeable
"No Brainer"	2018	—	—	—	—	—	—	—	—	—	—		Unlikeable
"Hi, It's Me"	2019	—	—	—	—	—	—	—	—	—	—		Hi, It's Me
"Stupid" (with Baby Tate)	2019	1	—	—	—	—	63	93	29	—	—	RIAA: Platinum; MC: Platinum; RMNZ: Gold	Hi, It's Me
"Working Bitch"	2019	—	—	—	—	—	99	—	—	—	—		Hi, It's Me
"Tantrum"	2020	—	—	—	—	—	—	—	—	—	—		Demidevil
"Cry" (featuring Grimes)	2020	—	—	—	—	—	—	—	37	—	—		Demidevil
"Daisy"	2020	3	32	36	40	53	74	40	14	44	24	RIAA: Platinum; BPI: Gold; MC: 2× Platinum; RMNZ: Platinum	Demidevil
"Deal with It" (featuring Kelis)	2021	—	—	—	—	—	—	—	9	—	84		Demidevil
"Slumber Party" (featuring Princess Nokia)	2021	—	—	—	—	—	91	57	30	—	70	RIAA: Gold; BPI: Silver; MC: Platinum; RMNZ: Gold	Demidevil
"Panic Attacks in Paradise"	2021	—	—	—	—	—	—	—	—	—	—		Non-album singles
"Maggots"	2021	—	—	—	—	—	—	—	—	—	—		Non-album singles
"You Make Me Sick!"	2023	—	—	—	—	—	—	—	—	—	—		Weedkiller
"Worms"	2023	—	—	—	—	—	—	—	—	—	—		Weedkiller
"Weedkiller"	2023	—	—	—	—	—	—	—	—	—	—		Weedkiller
"Possession of a Weapon"	2023	—	—	—	—	—	—	—	—	—	—		Weedkiller
"Cheerleader"	2023	—	—	—	—	—	—	—	—	—	—		Weedkiller
"Paint the Town Blue"	2024	—	—	—	—	—	—	—	37	—	—		Non-album single
"Itty Bitty"	2025	—	—	—	—	—	—	—	17	—	—		Smoochies
"Trinkets"	2025	—	—	—	—	—	—	—	—	—	—		Smoochies
"Sticky Fingers"	2025	—	—	—	—	—	—	—	—	—	—		Smoochies
"Smoochie Girl"	2025	—	—	—	—	—	—	—	—	—	—		Smoochies
"Wet Like" (featuring Cobrah)	2025	—	—	—	—	—	—	—	37	—	—		Smoochies
"—" denotes releases that did not chart, or charted on a subchart.

=== As featured artist ===
Title	Year	Album
"Mosquito" (Sente featuring Ashnikko)	2016	Non-album singles
"Not That Girl (Ashnikko Remix)" (Girli featuring Ashnikko)	2017	Non-album singles
"Pancake" (Jaded featuring Ashnikko)	2018	Non-album singles
"Break My Back" (Jarreau Vandal featuring Ashnikko)	2018	Anthology
"Fire Again" (Valorant featuring Ashnikko)	2022	Non-album singles
"Daddy" (Victoria featuring Ashnikko)	2025	Non-album singles
"Recollect" (Konomi Suzuki featuring Ashnikko)	2026	Non-album singles

=== Promotional singles ===
Title	Year	Album
"Halloweenie"	2018	Halloweenie I–VI
"Special"	2019	Hi, It's Me
"Halloweenie II: Pumpkin Spice" (Note: "Halloweenie II: Pumpkin Spice" is also included on Hi It's Me EP, but only on the physical edition of the project.)	2019	Halloweenie I–VI
"Halloweenie III: Seven Days"	2020	Halloweenie I–VI
"Halloweenie IV: Innards"	2021	Halloweenie I–VI
"Carol of the Bells (Spotify Singles Holiday)"	2021	Non-album single
"Halloweenie V: The Moss King"	2023	Halloweenie I–VI
"Halloweenie VI: Possess Me"	2024	Halloweenie I–VI

== Other charted songs ==
Title	Year	Peak chart positions	Album
Title	Year	NZ Hot	Album
"Skin Cleared"	2025	32	Smoochies

== Guest appearances ==
Title	Year	Other artist(s)	Album
"Kiss Kat"	2014	Nightwave	Nightlife
"Ballistic"	2017	Nonsens & Trekkie Trax Crew	Good Enuff X Trekkie Trax Compilation
"Fever"	2018	Yurrit, Terrell Morris	Life Experience, Pt. 1
"Confidence"	2019	Oscar Scheller	HTTP404
"R.I.P"	2019	Brooke Candy	Sexorcism
"Boss Bitch"	2019	Brooke Candy	Sexorcism
"Plastic Doll" (Ashnikko Remix)	2021	Lady Gaga	Dawn of Chromatica

== Songwriting credits ==
Year	Song	Artist(s)	Album
2019	"Happy"	Brooke Candy	Non-album single
2019	"XXXTC" (featuring Charli XCX and Maliibu Miitch)	Brooke Candy	Sexorcism
2019	"Cum" (featuring Iggy Azalea)	Brooke Candy	Sexorcism
2019	"Swing" (featuring Bree Runway)	Brooke Candy	Sexorcism
2019	"Encore" (featuring La Goony Chonga)	Brooke Candy	Sexorcism
2019	"Drip" (featuring Erika Jayne)	Brooke Candy	Sexorcism
2019	"Honey Pussy"	Brooke Candy	Sexorcism
2020	"Boss Bitch"	Doja Cat	Birds of Prey
2020	"Huh"	Faangs	Non-album single
2021	"Frost"	Tomorrow X Together	The Chaos Chapter: Freeze
2022	"Deep"	Hyo	Deep
