= Everything Sucks =

Everything Sucks may refer to:

- Everything Sucks (Descendents album)
- Everything Sucks (Reel Big Fish album)
- Everything Sucks (Princess Nokia album)
- Everything Sucks!, 2018 Netflix TV series
- Everything Sucks, a book by Hannah Friedman
- "Everything Sucks", a song by Dope on the album Felons and Revolutionaries
- "Everything Sucks", a song by Reel Big Fish on the album Turn the Radio Off
- "Everything Sucks", a song by Simple Plan on the album Taking One for the Team
- "Everything Sucks (When You're Gone)", a song by MxPx on the album Before Everything & After
