= Smoochies (album) =

2025 studio album by Ashnikko

- Standard cover

Studio album by Ashnikko
- Released: October 17, 2025
- Studios: House Mouse (Stockholm); Lotus Lounge (Stockholm); The Sanctuary (London); Studio23 (Los Angeles); Sleeper Sounds (UK); Studio Dune 54 (The Hague)
- Genres: Hyperpop; dance-pop; electroclash
- Length: 37:42
- Labels: Parlophone; Warner
- Producers: Slinger; Joep Le Blanc; Micah Jasper; Lotus IV; Oscar Scheller

Ashnikko chronology
Weedkiller (2023)	Smoochies (2025)

Singles from Smoochies
- 1. "Itty Bitty" Released: March 31, 2025; 2. "Trinkets" Released: August 12, 2025; 3. "Sticky Fingers" Released: August 29, 2025; 4. "Smoochie Girl" Released: September 19, 2025; 5. "Wet Like" Released: October 3, 2025

Professional ratings
Review scores
Source	Rating
AllMusic	3/5 stars
Classic Pop	3.5/5 stars
DIY	4/5 stars
Dork	3/5
NME	4/5 stars
Stereoboard	4/5 stars
Tom Hull – on the Web	B+

Smoochies is the second studio album by American rapper and singer Ashnikko, released on October 17, 2025, through Parlophone and Warner Records. The album was preceded by five singles "Itty Bitty", "Trinkets", "Sticky Fingers", "Smoochie Girl", and "Wet Like".

== Track listing ==
Smoochies track listing
No.	Title	Writer(s)	Producer(s)	Length
1.	"Smoochie Girl"	Ashton Nicole Casey; Slinger; Tove Burman	Slinger	3:01
2.	"Liquid"	Casey; Slinger; Skyler Stonestreet	Slinger	2:42
3.	"Trinkets"	Casey; Slinger; Elvira Anderfjärd; Burman; Luka Kloser	Slinger	1:56
4.	"Chichinya"	Casey; Slinger; Oscar Scheller; Stonestreet	Slinger	2:17
5.	"Skin Cleared"	Casey; Slinger; Noonie Bao; Spencer Stewart; Stonestreet; Linus Wiklund	Lotus IV; Slinger	2:45
6.	"Microplastics"	Casey; Slinger; Burman	Slinger	2:14
7.	"Full Frontal"	Casey; Slinger; Scheller	Scheller; Slinger	2:25
8.	"She's So Pretty"	Casey; Slinger; Micah Jasper; Steph Jones	Slinger; Jasper^{[a]}	1:51
9.	"Wet Like" (featuring Cobrah)	Casey; Slinger; Clara Sofie Blom Christensen; Stonestreet	Slinger	2:41
10.	"I Want My Boyfriends to Kiss"	Casey; Slinger; Jasper; Scheller; Stonestreet	Scheller; Slinger	2:24
11.	"Sticky Fingers"	Casey; Slinger; Anderfjärd; Burman; Kloser	Slinger	2:13
12.	"Lip Smacker"	Casey; Slinger; Anderfjärd; Burman	Slinger	2:31
13.	"Itty Bitty"	Casey; Slinger; Stonestreet	Slinger	2:42
14.	"Baby Teeth"	Casey; Slinger; Cleo Tighe	Slinger	2:33
15.	"It Girl"	Casey; Slinger; Joep Le Blanc; Burman; Andrew Jackson; Jasper; Scheller; Stonestreet	Blanc; Jasper; Slinger	3:22
Total length:				37:42

Notes

- ^{^[a]}signifies an additional producer
- "Sticky Fingers" contains a sample from "Kakhuri" by Trio Mandili.

== Personnel ==
Adapted from liner notes and Tidal.

- Ashnikko – vocals
- Cobrah – vocals (9)
- Slinger – bass, synthesizers, engineering (all tracks), guitar (1–4, 6–8, 12–15) strings (2, 11, 12, 15), backing vocals (2, 3, 5, 11, 12, 14, 15) piano (15), mixing (2, 4–15), executive producer
- Micah Jasper – guitar (8), programming (15)
- Joep Le Blanc – acoustic guitar, electric guitar, slide guitar (14), backing vocals, programming (15)
- Linus Wiklund – bass, drums, keyboards, programming (5)
- Oscar Scheller – bass, percussion (7, 10); synthesizer (7)
- Tove Burman – additional vocals (1), backing vocals (3, 6, 11)
- Skyler Stonestreet – backing vocals (2, 15)
- Elvira Anderfjärd – backing vocals (3)
- Luka Kloser – backing vocals (3)
- Steph Jones – backing vocals (8)
- Cleo Tighe – backing vocals (14)
- Nathan Boddy - mixing (1, 3), mastering

== Charts ==
=== Weekly charts ===
Weekly chart performance for Smoochies
Chart (2025)	Peak position
Australian Albums (ARIA)	15
Croatian International Albums (HDU)	1
Hungarian Physical Albums (MAHASZ)	13
Irish Albums (IRMA)	79
New Zealand Albums (RMNZ)	30
Polish Albums (ZPAV)	90
Scottish Albums (Official Charts)	14
UK Albums (Official Charts)	32
US Billboard 200	158

=== Monthly charts ===
Monthly chart performance
Chart (2025)	Position
Croatian International Vinyl Albums (HDU)	3

=== Year-end charts ===
Chart (2025)	Position
Croatian International Albums (HDU)	15
