= Everything Is Beautiful (Princess Nokia album) =

Studio album by Princess Nokia
- Released: February 26, 2020
- Genre: Hip-hop; alternative rock
- Length: 31:11
- Label: Platoon
- Producer: A. Lau; Carlostruly; Justus West; Chris Lare; Onyx Collective; Adam Pallin; Proda; Terrace Martin; Tony Seltzer

Princess Nokia chronology
Everything Sucks (2020)	Everything Is Beautiful (2020)

Everything Is Beautiful is the fourth studio album by American rapper Princess Nokia. It was released on February 26, 2020, on the same day as their third studio album, Everything Sucks. The album was meant to represent the "sensitive, feminine side of Princess Nokia" and was recorded mostly with live instrumentation. The album was preceded by the single, "Green Eggs & Ham". The album received positive reviews from critics.

== Production ==
The album was recorded over two years in New York, Los Angeles, and Puerto Rico.

== Critical reception ==
Professional ratings
Review scores
Source	Rating
And It Don't Stop	A−
The Independent	4/5 stars
Pitchfork	7.1/10
Tom Hull – on the Web	B+

The album received generally favourable reviews from critics. At Metacritic, which assigns a normalized rating out of 100 to reviews from professional publications, the album received an average score of 75, based on 6 reviews. Reviewing the album in his "Consumer Guide" column, Robert Christgau said the album is "not beautiful, exactly—more cute like the piano parts, which, while not exactly pop because she doesn't exactly have the pipes, color if not define every one of these 12 chirpy, chin-up tracks."

== Track listing ==
Everything Is Beautiful track listing
No.	Title	Producer(s)	Length
1.	"Green Eggs & Ham"	Adam Pallin	1:46
2.	"Happy Place"	Carlostruly; Tony Seltzer	2:19
3.	"Wash & Sets"	Adam Pallin	2:25
4.	"Gemini"	Tony Seltzer	3:05
5.	"Wavy"	Tony Seltzer	2:47
6.	"Sugar Honey Iced Tea (S.H.I.T.)"	Adam Pallin; Tony Seltzer	2:28
7.	"Soul Food y Adobo"	Tony Seltzer; A. Lau	2:22
8.	"Sunday Best" (featuring Onyx Collective and OSHUN)	Proda; Onyx Collective	3:48
9.	"Blessings" (featuring Terrace Martin)	Terrace Martin; Justus West	3:09
10.	"Heart"	Tony Seltzer	1:19
11.	"I Am Free"	Chris Lare	2:58
12.	"The Conclusion"	Tony Seltzer	2:45
Total length:			31:11

== Personnel ==
- Princess Nokia – vocals
- Andy Park – mixing
- Joe LaPorta – mastering
- Adam Pallin – producer (1, 3, 6)
- Carlostruly – producer (2)
- Tony Seltzer – producer (2, 4–7, 10, 12)
- A. Lau – producer (7)
- Oshun – vocals (8)
- Onyx Collective – vocals (8), producer (8)
- Proda – producer (8)
- Terrace Martin – vocals (9), producer (9)
- Justus West – producer (9)
- Chris Lare – producer (11)
