= Demidevil =

2021 mixtape by Ashnikko

Mixtape by Ashnikko
- Released: January 15, 2021
- Recorded: 2019–2020
- Genres: Pop; pop-trap
- Length: 25:24
- Labels: Parlophone; Warner
- Producers: Marcus Andersson; CallMeTheKidd; Ebenezer; Andrew Goldstein; J Mills; Oscar Scheller; Slinger

Ashnikko chronology
Hi It's Me (2019)	Demidevil (2021)	Weedkiller (2023)

Singles from Demidevil
- 1. "Cry" Released: June 17, 2020; 2. "Daisy" Released: July 9, 2020; 3. "Deal with It" Released: January 12, 2021; 4. "Slumber Party" Released: April 23, 2021

Demidevil (stylized in all caps) is the debut mixtape by American rapper and singer-songwriter Ashnikko. It was released on January 15, 2021, through Parlophone and Warner Records. The mixtape was supported by four singles: "Cry" featuring Grimes, "Daisy", "Deal with It" featuring Kelis, and "Slumber Party" featuring Princess Nokia.

== Background ==
Following the release of her 2019 EP, Hi It's Me, Ashnikko would return with the single "Tantrum" on March 6, 2020. Originally intended as the lead single for the mixtape, the song would later be demoted to a stand-alone single. The "DemiDevil" character was first portrayed in the "Tantrum" music video alongside Ashnikko herself and another character titled "Little Blue". The latter would later be revealed as a song title on the mixtape. Album track "Clitoris! The Musical" was first featured in the video "ASH WEDNESDAY 2020". Ashnikko first teased the mixtape in a series of videos in which she is gradually turning into her "demidevil" alter ego. The last of the three videos revealed the cover art, tracklist and release date for the mixtape. Ashnikko coincidingly, officially announced the mixtape on August 28, 2020, via her social media platforms.

Demidevil was met with several delays before its release. An initial date for October 9, 2020 was announced in August earlier that year. The mixtape then suffered its first delay in September due to "shipping delays" and other unknown reasons. The mixtape was then intended for a November 13 release. A second delay was announced in October 2020, with the mixtape having a scheduled release for February 19, 2021. In early 2021, Warner Music Group's merchandise team accidentally shipped out orders including physical copies of the mixtape earlier than its February 19 release. Following this error, Ashnikko would reveal a new date for the mixtape, January 15, 2021.

A deluxe edition CD, adding two bonus tracks ('Tantrum' and 'Daisy 2.0'), along with a sixteen-page booklet, is due for release on September 6, 2024.

== Composition ==
Demidevil is a pop and pop-trap album that takes influence from R&B, hip hop, pop punk, electropop, nu metal, and hyperpop.

== Singles ==
The lead single from Demidevil, "Cry", was released on June 17, 2020, and features Canadian musician Grimes. An animated music video was premiered alongside the track's release. This video would later be nominated at the UK Music Video Awards in the category of "Best Pop Video - UK".

The opening track, "Daisy" was released as the mixtape's second single on July 9, 2020. A music video in collaboration with Beats Electronics and TikTok was released on August 7, 2020. Commercially, "Daisy" peaked at #24 on the UK Singles Chart, becoming her first charting and first top 40 hit in the United Kingdom. The song also peaked at #3 on the Billboard Bubbling Under Hot 100 chart, becoming her second entry on the chart after "Stupid".

After being teased a day before its release, "Deal with It" featuring American singer Kelis was released as the mixtape's third single on January 12, 2021. It premiered on BBC Radio 1 and its music video was released along with the song's widespread release. With less than 3 days of tracking, the single charted at #84 on the UK Singles Chart, becoming her second ever charting track in the United Kingdom.

"Slumber Party" featuring American rapper Princess Nokia was released as the fourth single on April 23, 2021, after achieving viral success on TikTok. The song would be performed on the Late Night with Seth Meyers show on April 30, 2021. A music video was released on May 13, 2021.

== Critical reception ==
Professional ratings
Aggregate scores
Source	Rating
AnyDecentMusic?	6.7/10
Metacritic	74/100
Review scores
Source	Rating
AllMusic	3.5/5 stars
Clash	8/10
DIY	4/5 stars
Dork	4/5 stars
The Line of Best Fit	8/10
NME	4/5 stars
The Observer	4/5 stars
Pitchfork	6.9/10
PopMatters	6/10
RapReviews	5.5/10

According to the review aggregator Metacritic, Demidevil received "generally favorable reviews" based on a weighted average score of 74 out of 100 from 9 critic scores. El Hunt of NME wrote that Ashnikko's "first real body of work builds on the early hype, and draws from a far wider pot of musical influences than before: Nu-metal, pop-punk, The Neptunes-esque production tricks and campy musical theatre", and concluded that the record "shows that [she is] far more than a two-trend wonder – with a tank full of intriguing bangers that evade living under 'Daisy's formidable shadow."

Reviewing the album for AllMusic, Fred Thomas stated that "The project's ten tracks nicely mix Ashnikko's enormous personality and brazen confidence with infectious pop-trap production and hints of early-2000s nostalgia that range from subtle to overt."

Billboard included the album on their list of the best albums of the first half of 2021.

== Commercial performance ==
Demidevil debuted at number 107 on the US Billboard 200. It also debuted at number one on the US Heatseekers Albums (Billboard). In the United Kingdom, the album debuted at number 19 on the UK Albums (OCC). Overall, the album debuted in seven countries including Canada.

== Track listing ==
Demidevil track listing
No.	Title	Writer(s)	Producer(s)	Length
1.	"Daisy"	Ashton Casey; Slinger	Slinger	2:26
2.	"Toxic"	Casey; Kelly Kiara; Slinger	Slinger	2:42
3.	"Deal with It" (featuring Kelis)	Casey; Mark Crew; Daniel Priddy; Dagny Sandvik; Max Wolfgang; Chad Hugo^{[b]}; Pharrell Williams^{[b]}	Slinger; Andrew Goldstein; Crew^{[a]}; Priddy^{[a]}	3:11
4.	"Slumber Party" (featuring Princess Nokia)	Casey; Peter Elegbede; Robot Moonjuice; Destiny Ortiz	CallMeTheKidd	2:58
5.	"Drunk with My Friends"	Casey; Oscar Scheller	Scheller	2:08
6.	"Little Boy"	Casey; Scheller	Scheller	2:52
7.	"Cry" (featuring Grimes)	Casey; Claire Boucher; Ebenezer Fabiyi; Melissa Storwick	Ebenezer	2:06
8.	"L8r Boi"	Casey; Slinger; Scott Alspach^{[c]}; Lauren Christy^{[c]}; Graham Edwards^{[c]}; Avril Lavigne^{[c]}	Slinger; Goldstein	2:23
9.	"Good While It Lasted"	Casey; Marcus Andersson; Gina Kushka; Jon Mills	J Mills; Andersson; Scheller^{[a]}	3:02
10.	"Clitoris! The Musical"	Casey; Scheller	Scheller	1:36
Total length:				25:24

Notes

- ^{^[a]} signifies an additional producer.
- ^{^[b]} "Deal with It" samples the song "Caught Out There" as performed by Kelis and written by Chad Hugo and Pharrell Williams.
- ^{^[c]} "L8r Boi" interpolates the song "Sk8er Boi" as performed by Avril Lavigne and written by Lavigne, Lauren Christy, Scott Alspach and Graham Edwards.

== Personnel ==
Musicians

- Ashnikko – vocals
- Slinger – drums, synthesizer (tracks 1–3, 8); backing vocals, keyboards (1–3); sitar (1, 2), santur dulcimer (2), bells (3); flute, guitar, piano (8)
- Mark Crew – keyboards, programming (3)
- Dan Priddy – keyboards, programming (3)
- Kelis – vocals (3)
- CallMeTheKidd – keyboards, programming (4)
- Princess Nokia – vocals (4)
- Oscar Scheller – programming (5, 6, 9, 10); bass guitar, drums, synthesizer (5, 6, 9); keyboards (10)
- Ebenezer – programming (7)
- Grimes – vocals (7)
- Andrew Goldstein – guitar, keyboards, programming (8)
- Marcus Andersson – acoustic guitar (9)

Technical

- Chris Gehringer – mastering (1–4, 6, 8–10)
- John Greenham – mastering (5, 7)
- Mark "Spike" Stent – mixing (1, 3, 7, 8)
- Slinger – mixing (2), engineering (3, 8)
- CallMeTheKidd – mixing, engineering (4)
- Oscar Scheller – mixing (5, 6, 9, 10)
- Andrew Goldstein – engineering (3, 8)
- Ebenezer – engineering (7)
- Zukye Ardella – vocal engineering (4)
- Matt Wolach – mixing assistance (1, 3, 7, 8)

== Charts ==
Chart performance for Demidevil
Chart (2021–2024)	Peak position
Australian Albums (ARIA)	46
Canadian Albums (Billboard)	89
Hungarian Physical Albums (MAHASZ)	36
Irish Albums (IRMA)	69
Lithuanian Albums (AGATA)	22
Scottish Albums (Official Charts)	9
UK Albums (Official Charts)	19
US Billboard 200	107
US Heatseekers Albums (Billboard)	1

== Certifications ==
Region	Certification	Certified units/sales
Brazil (Pro-Música Brasil)	Gold	20,000^{‡}
United Kingdom (BPI)	Silver	60,000^{‡}
^{‡} Sales+streaming figures based on certification alone.
