= Ashnikko =

American rapper and singer (born 1996)

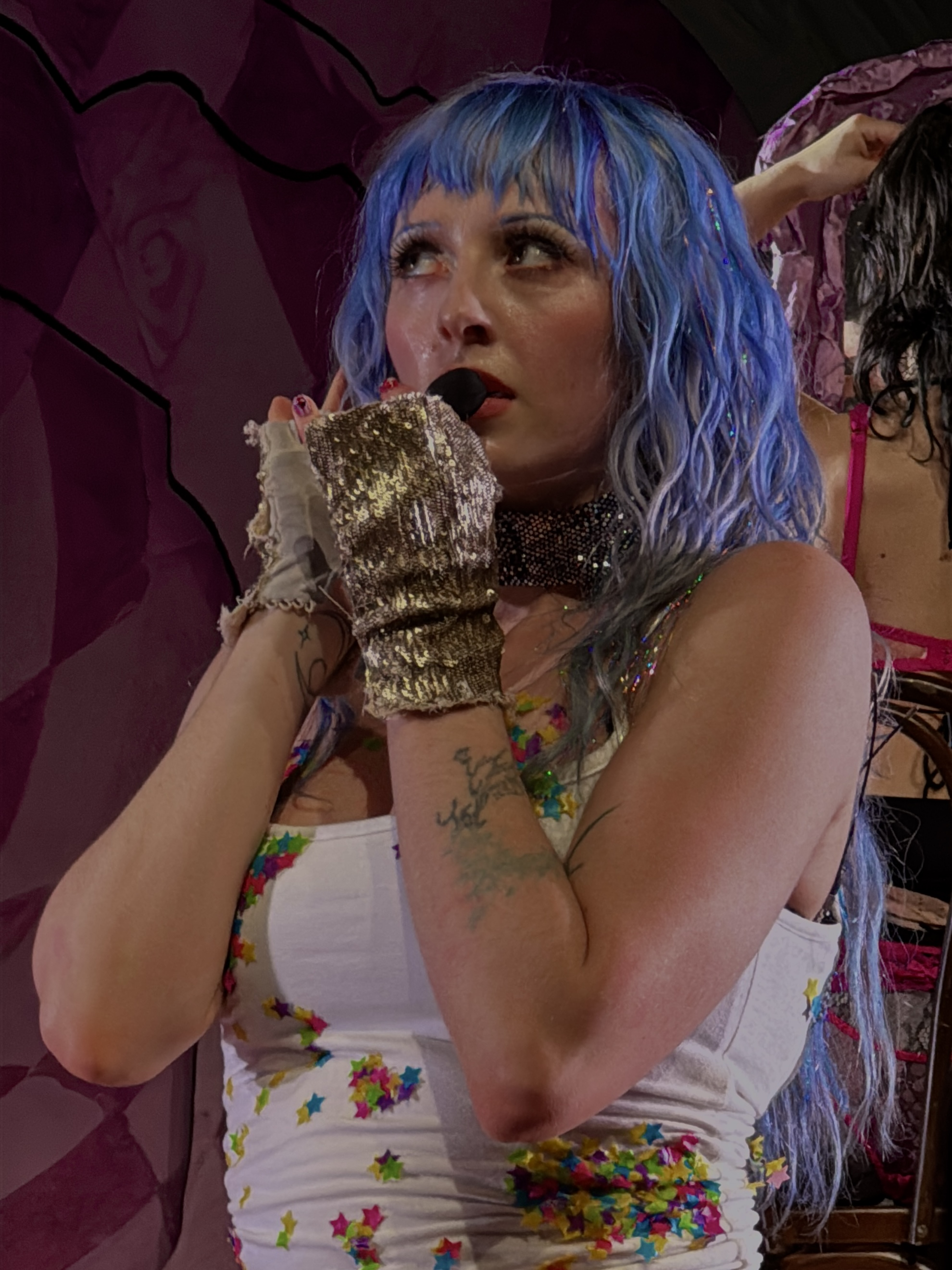
- Ashnikko in 2026

Background information
- Born: Ashton Nicole Casey; February 19, 1996 (age 30); Oak Ridge, North Carolina, U.S.
- Genres: Alt-pop; electropop
- Occupations: Rapper; singer; songwriter
- Works: Discography
- Years active: 2013–present
- Labels: Digital Picnic; Parlophone; Warner
- Website: ashnikko.com

Ashton Nicole Casey (born February 19, 1996), known professionally as Ashnikko (/æʃˈniːkoʊ/ ash-NEE-koh), is an American rapper, singer, and songwriter. Their (Note: Ashnikko is genderfluid and uses she/her and they/them pronouns. This article uses they/them for consistency.) 2019 single, "Stupid" (featuring Baby Tate), gained viral popularity on the video-sharing platform TikTok and was certified platinum by the Recording Industry Association of America (RIAA). Ashnikko's debut mixtape, Demidevil (2021), spawned the singles "Daisy" and "Slumber Party" (featuring Princess Nokia). Their debut studio album, Weedkiller (2023), was followed by their second studio album, Smoochies (2025), both of which narrowly entered the Billboard 200.

In addition to their solo work, Ashnikko has co-written songs for other artists, including "Boss Bitch" (2020) for Doja Cat and songs for Brooke Candy, Tomorrow X Together, and Hyoyeon of Girls' Generation.

== Early life ==
Ashton Nicole Casey was born on February 19, 1996, in Oak Ridge, North Carolina, and raised in the city of Greensboro. Their parents exposed them to diverse musical stylings, such as country music and Slipknot. They recall becoming interested in music, specifically rap music, when they listened to Arular by M.I.A. at the age of 10, but did not listen to male musicians until they were 16 years old.

As a teenager, their family moved to Estonia for their father's studies, spending a year there before relocating again to Riga, Latvia. At one point, they were the only American in Latvia to attend a Latvian public high school. At the age of 18, Casey moved to London by themself.

== Career ==
=== 2016–2019: Career beginnings and Hi It's Me ===
Ashnikko's first song, "Krokodil", was produced by Raf Riley and published to SoundCloud in July 2016. They released their first EP, Sass Pancakes, under Digital Picnic Records in 2017. The EP was produced by Raf Riley and features appearances from Avelino. Ashnikko's second EP, Unlikeable, was released in November 2018. The EP spawned the singles "Blow", "Nice Girl", "Invitation" featuring Kodie Shane, and "No Brainer".

Ashnikko released their third EP, Hi It's Me, in July 2019. The EP was preceded by the promotional single "Special" and was launched alongside the EP's title track and lead single, "Hi It's Me". The second official single, "Stupid", featuring Yung Baby Tate, gained viral popularity on the video-sharing platform TikTok. The song reached number one on the Billboard Bubbling Under Hot 100 chart, the Billboard Bubbling Under R&B/Hip-Hop chart, and the Spotify Viral 50 chart. "Stupid" was also certified gold in the United States in August 2020, as well as in Canada. Another song from the EP, "Working Bitch", also found popularity on TikTok. Ashnikko embarked on a North American tour supporting American rapper Danny Brown in October 2019. they released the promotional single "Halloweenie II: Pumpkin Spice" in October 2019. They co-wrote eight songs, two of which they are featured on, on Brooke Candy's debut album, Sexorcism, which was released in October 2019.

=== 2020–2021: Breakthrough and Demidevil ===
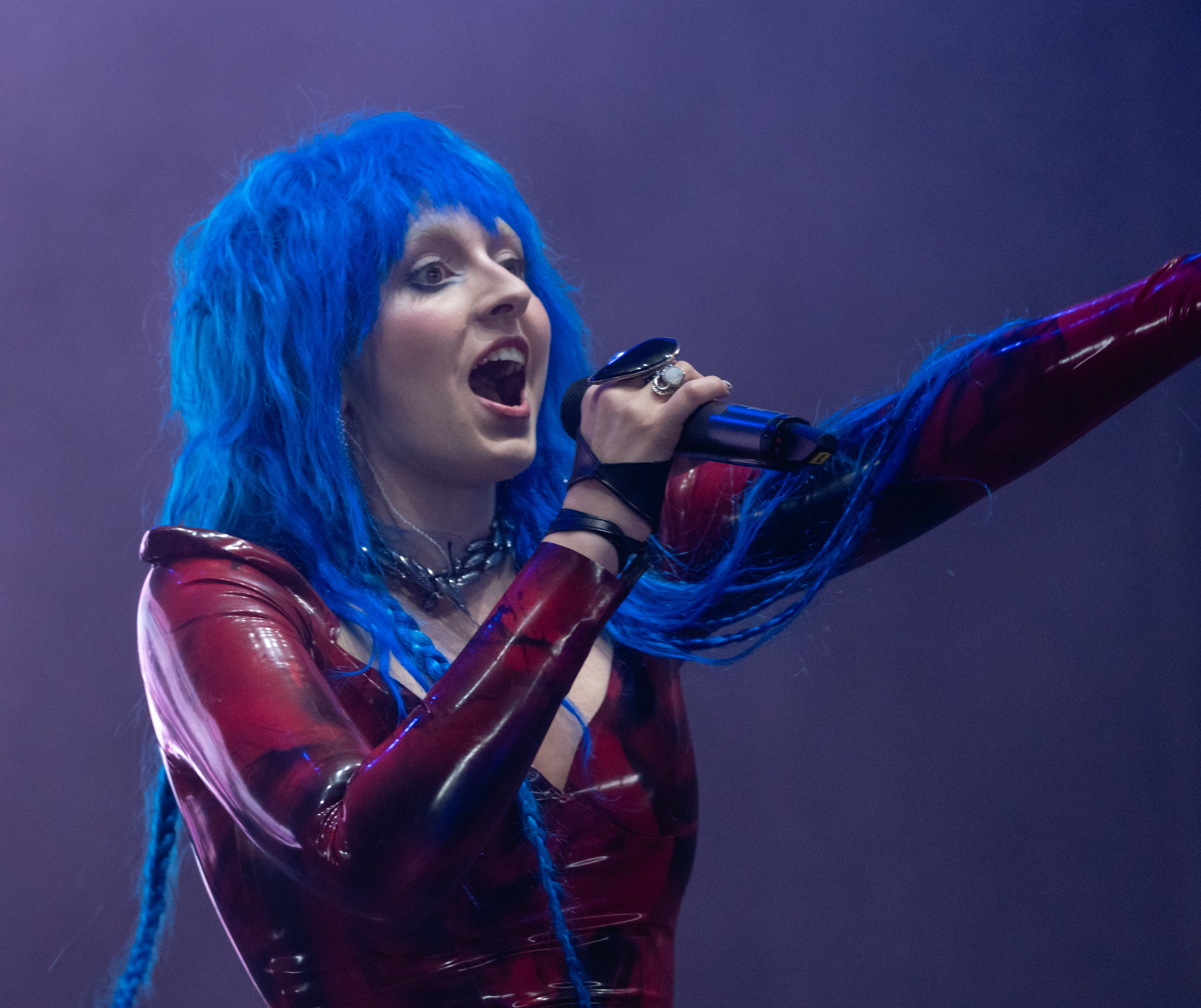
Ashnikko performing in 2021

Ashnikko co-wrote the song "Boss Bitch" with American rapper Doja Cat, which was included on the Birds of Prey soundtrack, Birds of Prey: The Album. Prior to the COVID-19 pandemic, Ashnikko was scheduled to accompany Doja Cat on her Hot Pink Tour throughout the United States in March 2020 before it was canceled. In March 2020, they released the standalone single "Tantrum". Later that month, they performed "Tantrum" live as part of The Fader's Digital Fader Fort event. "Cry", featuring Canadian musician Grimes, was then released in June 2020, alongside an animated music video. The song's music video was nominated for "Best Pop Video - UK" at the 2020 UK Music Video Awards. Following this, "Daisy" was released in July 2020, and a music video for the song was released in collaboration with Beats by Dre and TikTok a month later. "Daisy" became Ashnikko's breakthrough hit, charting internationally in countries including Australia, Belgium and the United Kingdom. It reached a peak of number 24 on the UK Singles Chart, becoming their first charting and first top 40 hit in the UK. Ashnikko's third Halloween song, "Halloweenie III: Seven Days", was released in October 2020. They were nominated for Best Push Act at the 2020 MTV Europe Music Awards.

"Cry" and "Daisy" both appear on Ashnikko's debut mixtape, Demidevil, which was released on January 15, 2021. "Deal with It" featuring Kelis and "Slumber Party" featuring Princess Nokia served as the third and fourth singles from the mixtape, respectively. In support of the mixtape, Ashnikko announced The Demidevil Tour, which was set to take place in October 2021, with shows in North America, the UK, and Ireland.

Ashnikko co-wrote the song "Frost" released on May 31, 2021, which figures in Korean boy band Tomorrow X Together – TXT's album The Chaos Chapter: Freeze and its repackage album The Chaos Chapter: Fight or Escape released on August 17, 2021. They sent the hyper-pop, trap-based song over to TXT in English. The song was then translated to Korean. In September 2021, they were featured on Lady Gaga's remix album, Dawn of Chromatica, where they produced a remix of the track, "Plastic Doll".

=== 2022–2024: Hiatus, Weedkiller and world tour ===
After a year hiatus since the release of the two-side singles "Panic Attacks In Paradise" and "Maggots" on September 29, 2021, Ashnikko released their first single, "You Make Me Sick!", on February 8, 2023. On March 1, they announced the release of their debut album, Weedkiller, for August 25, 2023; the Weedkiller World Tour across Asia, Oceania, North America and Europe started on March 24, 2023, in Japan and ended on December 11, 2023, in Ireland; and the second single from the album, "Worms", which was released a day later on March 2. On May 24 the third single titled "Possession of a Weapon" was released. The most recent single from the album is "Cheerleader", which was issued on July 28.

Ashnikko performed at the Coachella Arts and Music Festival on the second day of performances during the festival's two-week run on April 22, 2023, in Coachella, California.

Ashnikko also performed at the 2024 League of Legends Worlds Finals Opening Ceremony. They performed the song, "Paint The Town Blue" from Riot Games' series Arcane.

=== 2025-present: Smoochies and the second world tour ===
In August 2025, Ashnikko announced their second album, Smoochies, which released on October 17, 2025. The first single, "Itty Bitty" was released before the album announcement, on March 21, 2025. A music video for the second single, "Trinkets", was released along with the album announcement on August 12, 2025. The next single, "Sticky Fingers", was released on August 29, followed by "Smoochie Girl" on September 19, and "Wet Like" (featuring Cobrah) on October 3.

Ashnikko announced on August 14, 2025, that they are touring the Smoochies album in the UK and Ireland, and on September 15, that they are further touring in Northern Europe, the US, Australia, and New Zealand from January 26, 2026 until September 29, 2026.

== Artistry ==
Ashnikko is primarily alt-pop, and electropop. They described their style of music as "angry, punk, hip hop, sad-girl-feminist, bubblegum, poo-poo music", and has clarified that their music is not intended to be comedic or parody-based.

Ashnikko is known for their Tokyo-inspired street fashion. they are also known for their unique, bright blue hair, which is naturally brown. In the video for "Nice Girl" and some of their early vlogs, their hair is pastel green. Their hair in the "Daisy" music video is yellow, pink, and red.

Ashnikko has cited their musical influences as M.I.A., Gwen Stefani, Lil' Kim, Björk, Paramore, Avril Lavigne, Nicki Minaj, Missy Elliott, Dolly Parton, Janis Joplin, King Woman and Joan Jett, and has stated that their favorite song is "Bossy" by Kelis. they have also listed Doja Cat, Grimes, Tierra Whack, Rico Nasty, Hayley Williams, Princess Nokia, Kim Petras, and Charli XCX as their "peers" and artists they "really respect".

== Personal life ==
Ashnikko stated on Twitter in June 2019 that they identified as bisexual, but later clarified in a 2020 interview that they identified as pansexual. In May 2021, Ashnikko came out as genderfluid on Twitter, saying that "i just didn't feel ready to tell the internet yet but i guess now's a good time since everyone's doing a dissection into my sexuality and gender identity".

In July 2020, while discussing the meaning behind the lyrics of their single "Daisy", they said that while their family practices Christianity, they do not.

In December 2021, Ashnikko began dating fellow singer Arlo Parks. They split in 2024, with Ashnikko referencing the breakup in their debut performance of their upcoming song "Itty Bitty" while opening for Billie Eilish in December 2024.

=== Advocacy ===
Ashnikko has described themself as a feminist and has attributed discovering intersectional feminism through microblogging website Tumblr as a teenager as a turning point for them. They have been vocal about a range of social justice issues, having spoken out about the commercialisation of feminism in November 2019, while advocating for victims of police brutality through social media.

== Discography ==
- Weedkiller (2023)
- Smoochies (2025)

== Tours ==
=== Headlining ===
- The Demidevil Tour (2021)
- Weedkiller Tour (2023–2024)
- Smoochies Tour (2026)

=== Opening act ===
- Billie Eilish - Hit Me Hard and Soft: The Tour (2024–2025) (Note: Ashnikko will also open for Eilish on December 20, 2024.)

== Awards and nominations ==
Organization	Year	Category	Nominated work	Result	Ref.
MTV Europe Music Awards	2020	Best Push Act	Themself	Nominated	
Music Week Awards	2021	Music & Brand Partnership	Ashnikko x Beats By Dre	Won	
UK Music Video Awards	2019	Best Pop Video – Newcomer	"Hi, It's Me"	Won	
UK Music Video Awards	2020	Best Pop Video – Newcomer	"Drunk with My Friends"	Nominated	
UK Music Video Awards	2020	Best Pop Video – UK	"Cry"	Nominated	
UK Music Video Awards	2021	Best Hair & Make-up in a Video	"Deal with It" (ft. Kelis)	Nominated	
Shorty Awards	2021	Best Influencer & Celebrity TikTok Campaign	#BeatsDaisyChallenge (Ashnikko x Beats by Dre)	Nominated	
Ivor Novello Awards	2021	Best Contemporary Song	"Daisy"	Nominated	
Berlin Music Video Awards	2024	Best Performer	"Cheerleader"	Nominated	
Berlin Music Video Awards	2023	Best Animation	"Worms"	Nominated	
Berlin Music Video Awards	2023	Best VFX	"You Make Me Sick"	Nominated	
