= Jed Fish =

Jed Fish may refer to:

- Jed the Fish (born 1955), disc jockey
- Jedd Fisch (born 1976), American football coach
