= 1992 Deluxe =

Album by Princess Nokia

Studio album by Princess Nokia
- Released: September 8, 2017
- Recorded: 2016–2017
- Studio: Letter Racer Studio
- Genre: Hip-hop
- Length: 49:42
- Label: Rough Trade
- Producer: Benamin; Blanco; Bobby Johnson; D.A. Doman; DJ Bass Bear; ETRNL; HelloMyFuture; Kadi Haze; Low Pros; Mistah Mota; OG Wally West; OWWWLS; Ralz Beats; Saint; Sammy; Sound M.O.B.

Princess Nokia chronology
Metallic Butterfly (2014)	1992 Deluxe (2017)	A Girl Cried Red (2018)

Singles from 1992 Deluxe
- 1. "G.O.A.T." Released: June 28, 2017; 2. "Tomboy" Released: July 14, 2017; 3. "Brujas" Released: August 18, 2017; 4. "Kitana" Released: August 25, 2017

1992 Deluxe is the second studio album by American rapper Princess Nokia. It was released on September 8, 2017. It is an expanded version of her 2016 mixtape, 1992. The title derives from her birth year. It peaked at number 25 on Billboard's Heatseekers Albums chart.

== Critical reception ==
Professional ratings
Aggregate scores
Source	Rating
Metacritic	77/100
Review scores
Source	Rating
Drowned in Sound	9/10
Exclaim!	6/10
The Guardian	4/5 stars
The Observer	4/5 stars
Pitchfork	6.2/10
Q	4/5 stars
The Skinny	4/5 stars
Vice (Expert Witness)	A

At Metacritic, which assigns a weighted average score out of 100 to reviews from mainstream critics, 1992 Deluxe received an average score of 77% based on 8 reviews, indicating "generally favorable reviews".

Ben Beaumont-Thomas of The Guardian gave the album 4 stars out of 5, saying, "Her flow has the freewheeling energy of the battle freestyle, and often forgoes narrative in favour of a stream of boastful non-sequiturs about Mortal Kombat and Blue's Clues, but, through sheer force of charisma, her blunt edges still cause major damage." Writing for Noisey, Robert Christgau gave the album a grade of "A", calling Princess Nokia "the most complete New Yorker to hit hip-hop since Heems if not Nas."

NME listed it as the 32nd best album of 2017.

== Track listing ==
No.	Title	Writer(s)	Producer(s)	Length
1.	"Bart Simpson"	Destiny Frasqueri	Bobby Johnson	3:35
2.	"Tomboy"	Frasqueri; Gilberto Ramírez	Saint	3:37
3.	"Kitana"	Frasqueri; Alain Macklovitch; Lexus Arnel Lewis	Low Pros	3:17
4.	"Brujas"	Frasqueri; Reynaldo Hernandez; Christian Vargas	DJ Bass Bear; Blanco	2:59
5.	"Mine"	Frasqueri; Samuel Burgess	Sammy	3:25
6.	"Excellent"	Frasqueri; ETRNL	ETRNL	2:43
7.	"Saggy Denim" (featuring Wiki)	Frasqueri; Brandon Tillman; Raul Gonzalez	Sound M.O.B.	3:13
8.	"Green Line"	Frasqueri; David A. Doman; Alex Brofsky	Doman	3:50
9.	"ABCs of New York"	Frasqueri; James Richardson III	HelloMyFuture	3:25
10.	"Goth Kid"	Frasqueri; Richardson	HelloMyFuture; Benamin^{[a]}	3:56
11.	"Receipts"	Frasqueri; Richardson	HelloMyFuture; Benamin^{[a]}	3:23
12.	"G.O.A.T."	Frasqueri; William Herrera Jr.	OG Wally West	2:43
13.	"Brick City"	Frasqueri; Ravi Ollivierre	Ralz Beats	2:38
14.	"Flava"	Frasqueri; Bakari Chioke Cunningham	Kadi Haze	2:04
15.	"Different"	Frasqueri; Christopher Lare	OWWWLS	2:38
16.	"Chinese Slippers"	Frasqueri; Danny Guerrero	Mistah Mota	2:26
Total length:				49:42

Notes

- ^{^[a]} signifies a co-producer.

== Charts ==
Chart (2017)	Peak position
US Heatseekers Albums (Billboard)	25
