= Princess Nokia =

American rapper (born 1992)

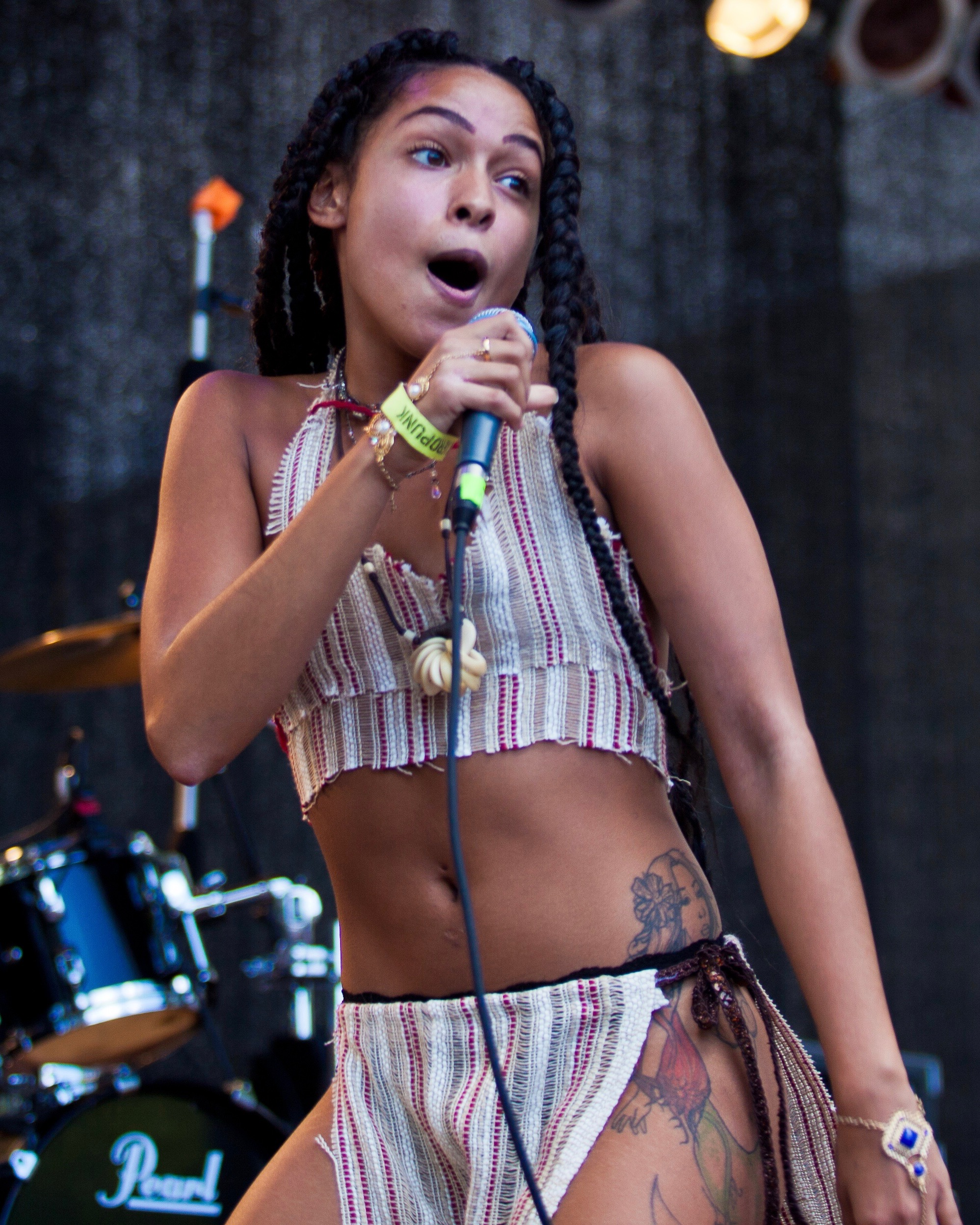
- Princess Nokia in 2014

Background information
- Also known as: Wavy Spice; Destiny Nicole Ortiz; Destiny
- Born: Destiny Nicole Frasqueri; June 14, 1992 (age 34); New York City, U.S.
- Genres: Hip-hop; emo rap; rap rock; trip hop; trap
- Occupations: Rapper; songwriter; singer; actress
- Labels: Artist House (current); Vice; Rough Trade; Platoon (former)

Destiny Nicole Frasqueri (born June 14, 1992), known professionally as Princess Nokia, is an American rapper, singer and songwriter. She (Note: Frasqueri uses she/her and they/them pronouns. This article uses feminine pronouns for consistency.) released her debut studio album, Metallic Butterfly, in 2014, followed by the 2015 mixtape Honeysuckle. As Princess Nokia, she rose to prominence for her 2017 studio album 1992 Deluxe. She released another mixtape, titled A Girl Cried Red, in 2018, followed by the release of two studio albums, Everything Sucks and Everything Is Beautiful, in 2020. In 2023, she released the EP I Love You but this is Goodbye. Her new album GIRLS was released via Artist House on October 10, 2025

== Early life ==
Frasqueri identifies as Afro-Indigenous and is of Puerto Rican descent. When Frasqueri was two, she lost her mother to AIDS. Between the ages of nine and sixteen, she was in foster care, during which her foster mother was physically abusive. After Frasqueri left foster care, she went to live with her grandmother. She subsequently started writing rhymes. Frasqueri lived around East Harlem and the Lower East Side of New York City at the time.

== Career ==
=== 2010–2018: Early career and career beginnings ===
In 2010, Frasqueri recorded and released her first song, titled "Destiny", under the stage name Wavy Spice on her SoundCloud page, and later released the song on her YouTube channel in mid-2012. Subsequently, she released her second song, titled "Bitch I'm Posh". She next released "YAYA", a song that chronicles her Taíno ancestry. She later released the singles "Vicki Gotti" and "Versace Hottie". Following the singles, Frasqueri changed her stage name to Princess Nokia, which she claimed was an alter ego, and introduced the character with the song "Nokia". The name was inspired by the brand of the Obama phone she was eligible for as a low-income earner under the Lifeline Program. On May 12, 2014, Frasqueri released her debut studio album, titled Metallic Butterfly, which debuted on Vice and SoundCloud. On September 8, 2017, she released her second studio album, 1992 Deluxe, an expanded version of her 2016 mixtape, 1992. It peaked at number 25 on the US Billboard's Heatseekers Albums chart. NME listed it as the 32nd best album of 2017.

Nokia debuted a radio show on Apple's Beats 1 Radio on February 18, 2018. Episodes aired every other Sunday and allowed listeners to get acquainted with the inner workings of Nokia's mind. The show has a total of six episodes labeled "The Voices in My Head with Princess Nokia." In September 2018, she was chosen as one of the six ambassadors by Maison Margiela to promote their new fragrance, Mutiny. In December 2018, Nokia released a "remastered and expanded version" of the album Metallic Butterfly, which includes three new bonus tracks. That same year, she released a mixtape titled A Girl Cried Red. Stefanie Fernández of NPR deemed it an expression of Frasqueri's artistic and emotional versatility and praised how she "transcends them."

=== 2019-2022: Everything Sucks And Everything is Beautiful ===
In 2019, Nokia had her debut performance as an actress in the independent film Angelfish. In September 2019, she released a song titled "Sugar Honey Iced Tea (S.H.I.T.)". It was described as "a bouncy, empowering bop built around dismissive lyrics about Nokia's enemies." In February 2020, Nokia released two albums: Everything Sucks and Everything Is Beautiful. Pitchfork described Everything Sucks as "locust swarm of angst, restless and frantic" and regarded Everything Is Beautiful as "warm and expansive" in comparison to the former. In March 2021, Nokia released a music video for the song, titled "It's Not My Fault". The single was released through Arista Records and marked the first one Nokia released through a major label.

In 2022, she voiced LaBrea, LaCienega's cousin in The Proud Family: Louder and Prouder.

=== 2025-Present: GIRLS ===
In 2025, Princess Nokia signed a label and management deal with independent NYC-based label Artist House. She released her single "Drop Dead Gorgeous" on June 27, 2025 and was included on the New Music Fix Playlist on BBC Music R6. Her second single "Blue Velvet" was released on September 2, 2025 and featured on BBC Radio 1’s New Music Show with Jack Saunders.

On 12 October 2025 Princess Nokia made her first UK TV appearance on Later... with Jools Holland performing a medley of the Blue Velvet and Medusa tracks.

Her album "GIRLS" was released on October 10, 2025.

== Artistry ==
Nokia's musical style has been described as "experimental" and "eagerly floating between genres such as rap, soul, rock and house." She lists rappers MC Lyte and Queen Latifah, girl group TLC, singer Shakira, as well as nu metal bands Korn and Slipknot as musical influences. Nokia also cites hardcore, punk, and rave cultures as influences for her performances.

== Personal life ==
Frasqueri identifies as bisexual and has stated such in a past interview and has also talked about how growing up near the queer community of New York City was an important part of her life. The early stages of Princess Nokia's musical career began through performing at gay clubs, as she gained popularity among the gay nightlife scene. She also identifies as a gender non-conforming person and uses both they/them and she/her pronouns. She has also referenced being on the autism spectrum in multiple songs, including her song "Period Blood".

Frasqueri is a strong supporter of intersectional feminism, founding the Smart Girl Club with Milah Libin, a podcast where she discusses healthy living and urban feminism. She is a practitioner of Santería, and has shared her own experience with clairvoyance and spirituality that she infuses her music with.

In 2017, Frasqueri punched a male concertgoer at the University of Cambridge, whom she accused of mouthing "dirty obscenities" at her. She later told the crowd that "that's what you do when a white boy disrespects you". Later that year, a video of a woman throwing hot soup in a man's face who was calling "a group of teenage boys" a racial slur whilst on a subway journey to Brooklyn surfaced. Frasqueri took responsibility for the incident, saying that "everybody on the train backed [her] up".

In 2023, Frasqueri's former backup dancer and friend, Tommy Playboy, died after being hit by a train in New York City.

== Discography ==
=== Studio albums ===
Title	Details	Peak chart positions
Title	Details	US Heat
Metallic Butterfly	Released: May 12, 2014; Label: Vice; Formats: Digital download, streaming	—
1992 Deluxe	Released: September 8, 2017; Label: Rough Trade; Formats: Digital download, streaming, vinyl	27
Everything Sucks	Released: February 26, 2020; Label: Platoon; Formats: Digital download, streaming	—
Everything Is Beautiful	Released: February 26, 2020; Label: Platoon; Formats: Digital download, streaming	—
GIRLS	Released: October 10, 2025; Label: Artist House; Formats: Digital download, streaming	—

=== Extended plays ===
Title	Details
I Love You but This Is Goodbye	Released: March 14, 2023; Label: Arista; Formats: Digital download, streaming

=== Mixtapes ===
- Honeysuckle (2015, as Destiny)
- 1992 (2016)
- A Girl Cried Red (2018)

=== Singles ===
==== As lead artist ====
Title	Year	Album
"G.O.A.T."	2017	1992 Deluxe
"Tomboy"	2017	1992 Deluxe
"Brujas"	2017	1992 Deluxe
"Kitana"	2017	1992 Deluxe
"Sugar Honey Iced Tea (S.H.I.T.)"	2019	Everything Is Beautiful
"Balenciaga"	2019	Everything Sucks
"Green Eggs & Ham"	2019	Everything Is Beautiful
"Practice"	2020	Everything Sucks
"I Like Him"	2020	Everything Sucks
"It's Not My Fault"	2021	Non-album singles
"Boys Are From Mars" (featuring Yung Baby Tate)	2021	Non-album singles
"No Effort"	2022	Non-album singles
"Diva"	2022	Non-album singles
"Closure"	2023	I Love You but This Is Goodbye
"Complicated"	2023	I Love You but This Is Goodbye
"Lo Siento"	2023	I Love You but This Is Goodbye
"Drop Dead Gorgeous"	2025	Girls
"Blue Velvet"	2025	Girls

==== As featured artist ====
Title	Year	Peak chart positions						Certification	Album
Title	Year	US	CAN	IRE	NZ Hot	UK	WW	Certification	Album
"Puerto Rican Judo" (with Ratking)	2014	—	—	—	—	—	—		So It Goes
"Wish You Would" (with Mykki Blanco)	2014	—	—	—	—	—	—		Spring/Summer 2014
"Steep Tech" (with Ratking)	2015	—	—	—	—	—	—		700-Fill
"Take Off" (with Branko)	2015	—	—	—	—	—	—		ATLAS
"The Last of the Real Ones" (with Fall Out Boy)	2017	—	—	—	—	—	—		Mania
"Outro" (with K. Michelle)	2017	—	—	—	—	—	—		Kimberly: The People I Used to Know
"Spit" (with Show Me the Body)	2017	—	—	—	—	—	—		Corpus I
"Fanta" (with Josh Forehead)	2017	—	—	—	—	—	—		Summer 2014
"Lmk_What's Really Good Remix_ feat_Princess Nokia_Junglepussy_Cupcakke_Ms. Boogie_100 Bpm" (with Kelela, Junglepussy, cupcakKe, and Ms. Boogie)	2018	—	—	—	—	—	—		Take Me A_Part, The Remixes
"Dame Aquí" (with Wiki)	2019	—	—	—	—	—	—		Oofie
"Get Paid" (with Aluna and Jada Kingdom)	2020	—	—	—	—	—	—		Renaissance
"Cynthia" (with Tony Seltzer and A. Lau)	2020	—	—	—	—	—	—		Avenues
"Madness" (with Silverstein)	2020	—	—	—	—	—	—		A Beautiful Place to Drown
"Slumber Party" (with Ashnikko)	2021	—	91	57	30	70	174	MC: Gold; RMNZ: Gold	Demidevil
"—" denotes a recording that did not chart or was not released in that territory.

=== Other certified songs ===
Title	Year	Certification	Album
"I Like Him"	2020	RIAA: Gold	Everything Sucks

== Filmography ==
=== Film ===
Year	Title	Role	Ref.
2019	Angelfish	Eva	
2022	Daughter of the Sea	Yanise	Short film
2025	Highest 2 Lowest	Rosa Fuentes	

== Awards and nominations ==
Award	Year	Category	Work	Result	Ref.
Sweden GAFFA Awards	2018	Best Foreign New Act	Herself	Nominated	
The A2IM Libera Awards	2018	Breakthrough Artist	Herself	Won	

== See also ==
- LGBT culture in New York City
- List of LGBT people from New York City
- NYC Pride March
- Nuyorican
- Puerto Ricans in New York City
