= Everything Sucks (Princess Nokia album) =

Studio album by Princess Nokia
- Released: February 26, 2020
- Genre: Hip-hop
- Length: 24:41
- Label: Platoon
- Producer: Chris Lare; Tony Seltzer; Powers Pleasant; Adam Pallin; Invisible Will

Princess Nokia chronology
A Girl Cried Red (2018)	Everything Sucks (2020)	Everything is Beautiful (2020)

Everything Sucks is the third studio album by American rapper Princess Nokia. It was released on February 26, 2020, on the same day as their fourth studio album, Everything Is Beautiful. The album has been described as "a brash, ruthless and insistent collection" of songs. The album was preceded by the single, "Practice", described by Nokia as having "brought punk to hip-hop." The album received generally positive reviews from critics.

== Production ==
A press release revealed that the album was "written primarily over one cathartic week in NYC" and was recorded by Nokia with collaborator Chris Lare. The album features additional production from Tony Seltzer, Powers Pleasant, Adam Pallin, and Invisible Will.

== Critical reception ==
Professional ratings
Review scores
Source	Rating
The Independent	4/5 stars
Pitchfork	6.7/10
Tom Hull – on the Web	B+

The album received generally favorable reviews from critics. At Metacritic, which assigns a normalized rating out of 100 to reviews from professional publications, the album received an average score of 74, based on 6 reviews.

== Track listing ==
Everything Sucks track listing
No.	Title	Producer(s)	Length
1.	"Harley Quinn"	Tony Seltzer	2:24
2.	"Crazy House"	Chris Lare	3:03
3.	"Welcome to the Circus"	Chris Lare	1:56
4.	"Gross"	Chris Lare	2:52
5.	"Fee Fi Foe"	Invisible Will	1:56
6.	"I Like Him"	Powers Pleasant	2:12
7.	"Practice"	Adam Pallin; Tony Seltzer	2:06
8.	"Balenciaga"	Tony Seltzer	2:29
9.	"Woes"	Chris Lare	2:22
10.	"Just a Kid"	Powers Pleasant	3:21
Total length:			24:41

== Personnel ==
- Princess Nokia – vocals
- Tyler Dopps – mixing
- Joe LaPorta – mastering
- Chris Lare – producer (2, 3, 4, 9)
- Tony Seltzer – producer (1, 7, 8)
- Powers Pleasant – producer (6, 10)
- Adam Pallin – producer (7)
- Invisible Will – producer (5)
