= Cry (Ashnikko song) =

2020 single by Ashnikko featuring Grimes

Single by Ashnikko featuring Grimes

from the album Demidevil
- A-side: "Daisy"
- Released: June 17, 2020
- Genre: Nu metal; rap rock; hyperpop
- Length: 2:05
- Label: Parlophone
- Songwriters: Ashton Casey; Ebenezer Fabiyi; Claire Boucher; Melissa Storwick
- Producer: Ebenezer

Ashnikko singles chronology
"Tantrum" (2020)	"Cry" (2020)	"Daisy" (2020)

Grimes singles chronology
"Delete Forever" (2020)	"Cry" (2020)	"Player of Games" (2021)

Music video
- "Cry" on YouTube

"Cry" is a song by American singer and rapper Ashnikko featuring vocals from Canadian singer-songwriter Grimes. It was released on June 17, 2020 through Parlophone Records as the lead single from Ashnikko's debut mixtape, Demidevil. It was produced by Ebenezer and written by Ashnikko, Grimes, Ebenezer, and Faangs. A nu metal, rap rock, and hyperpop track, its lyrics are dedicated to Ashnikko's ex-best friend who had sex with her ex-boyfriend.

The song was met with generally positive reviews from music critics, and was included on NPR's list of the best songs of 2020. The animated music video for the song was directed by Mike Anderson and released the same day as the song. It was nominated for Best Pop Video – UK at the 2020 UK Music Video Awards.

== Background and release ==
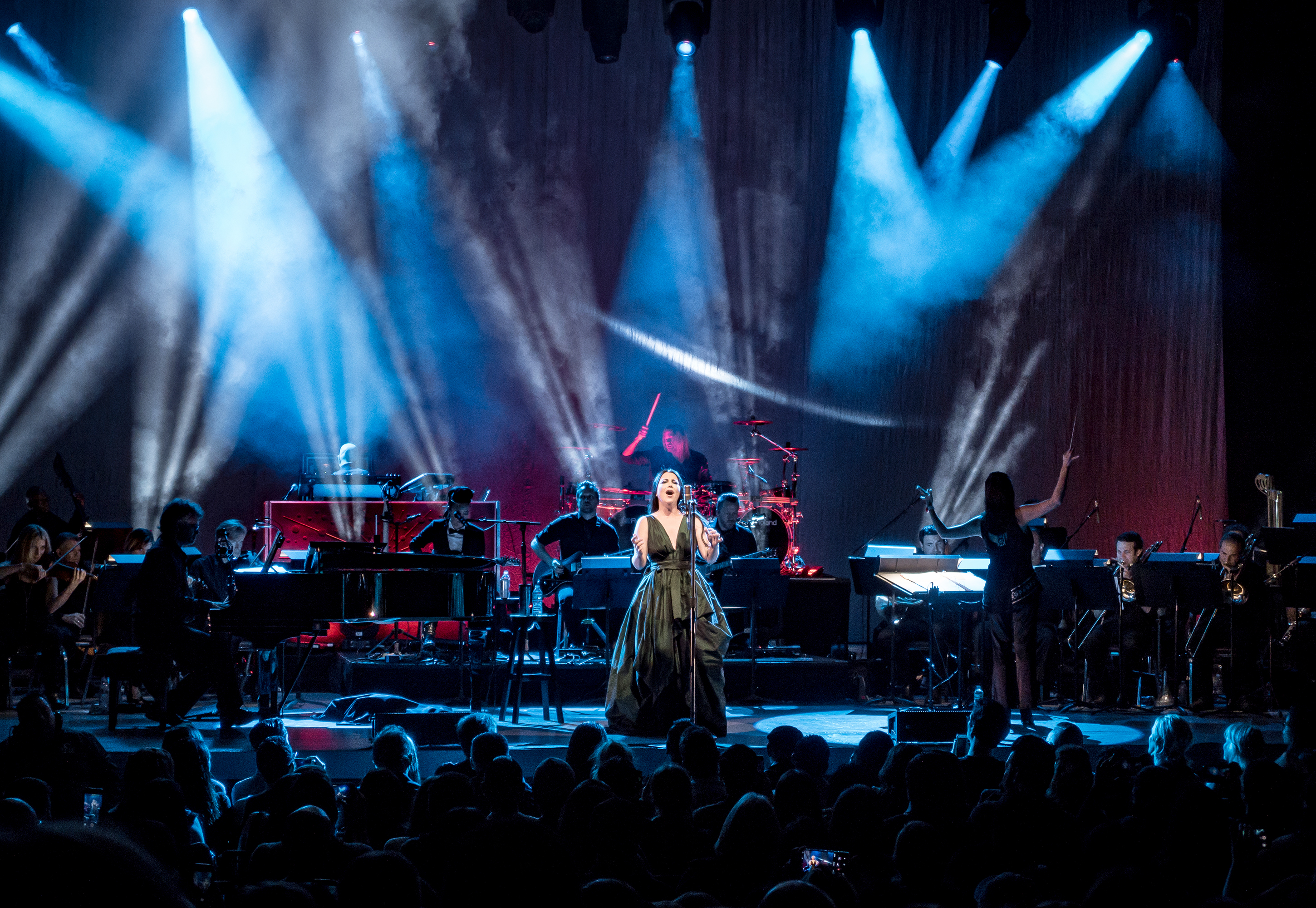
"Cry" was inspired by American rock band Evanescence (pictured)

Ashnikko originally wrote "Cry" out of a desire to write a song reminiscent of American rock band Evanescence as a joke, but came to like the sound of the track and decided to expand upon it. After Grimes followed Ashnikko on Instagram, Ashnikko sent her a direct message asking her to appear as a featured artist on one of her songs, to which Grimes agreed. The song was co-written with Canadian singer-songwriter Faangs.

The song was announced on May 27, 2020, while its release date was originally announced as June 3, 2020 via Ashnikko's Twitter account. The release was postponed in response to the George Floyd protests, with Ashnikko tweeting "Now is NOT the time to be promoting music." It was released as the lead single from her 2021 mixtape Demidevil, and became Grimes's first release after giving birth to X Æ A-12, her son with Elon Musk. The track was released on June 17, 2020. A heavy metal version of the song featuring the band Employed to Serve was released on August 4, 2020.

== Composition ==
"Cry"
A sample of the chorus of "Cry", which features Ashnikko "screaming" at an old best friend.

"Cry" has been described as nu metal, rap rock, and hyperpop. A distorted "emo-adjacent" guitar riff and trap drums make up the song's instrumentation. The first verse is rapped by Ashnikko, which transitions into a chorus sung by Ashnikko in a raspy, belted "scream", followed by the second verse sung by Grimes in an "eerie" whisper. The song's lyrics were written about an old best friend of Ashnikko's who had sex with her ex-boyfriend, with Ashnikko asking the friend, "Bitch, are you tryna make me cry?/Are you tryna make me lose it?". Grimes's verse features heavy reverb and paraphrases the first line of William Shakespeare's play Richard III with the lyric, "This is the winter of my discontent". AllMusic's Fred Thomas described the song as "jittery", while Elly Watson of DIY described it as "feisty". Ed Power of Hot Press deemed it "terrifying".

== Critical reception ==
Brendan Wetmore of Paper called the song "an ambitious burst of anger" and "one of [Ashnikko's] most expansive [songs], sonically". Ashley Reese of Jezebel wrote that the track "does a great job making the case that nu-metal revival is for the girls", adding, "Honestly, my only complaint is that the two-minute and five-second long song isn’t longer." Megan Townsend of Crack Magazine wrote that "Cry" was a "good introduction to [Ashnikko's] world as any", calling it "brilliant". Chris DeVille of Stereogum called it "crunching" and "guitar-powered", stating, "Where modern nu-metal/pop hybrids are concerned, it's as good as anything Rina Sawayama has done so far." In a PopMatters review of Demidevil, Nick Malone wrote that the song was one of several songs on the mixtape that was "serviceable, if forgettable", describing its chorus as "impassioned" and its verses as "weak".

NPR named "Cry" the 84th best song of 2020, with LaTesha Harris writing, "The strength of 'Cry' is in the duality...the track – campy hyperpop inspired by nu-metal acts like Evanescence – is expansive and vulnerable, oscillating between vicious, throat-punching shrieks and delicate, honeyed breaths."

== Music video ==
An animated character based on Ashnikko with several of Grimes's heads protruding from her limbs walks through a cityscape in the "Cry" music video.

The music video for "Cry" was released on the same day as the song. It was directed by Mike Anderson and made as a CGI animation, partially due to the COVID-19 pandemic as well as Grimes's pregnancy. The video was inspired by science fiction and anime.

=== Synopsis ===
The video begins with a green-haired girl running down an alleyway in a dilapidated city, then hiding behind a destroyed car. Ashnikko, who appears as a demon with three heads and chunks of her body missing, begins chasing after the green-haired girl, who shoots at Ashnikko but trips. Ashnikko picks the girl up by the neck to see that she is wearing a pendant with half of a broken heart before ripping her body in half.

A flashback shows Ashnikko, this time with no mutations, floating inside the head of a mecha in space, starting to cry when she sees her pendant, which has the other half of the broken heart. In a dark forest, Grimes, who is depicted as a group of identical fairies, shoots a beam of light into the sky, which hits the mecha, causing it to explode. Ashnikko starts floating in outer space, before Grimes taps her head, causing her to morph into her distorted, three-headed version. Back in the city, Ashnikko walks towards the green-haired girl and begins to mutate as Grimes's heads start to grow out of her limbs.

=== Reception and accolades ===
The video was named the fifth best music video released in June 2020 by Pitchfork, with writer Eric Torres writing, "Equal parts frantic action thriller and intergalactic anime, 'Cry' dazzles even as it turns grisly." Writing for Paper, Brendan Wetmore referred to the video as "a wild trip through Ashnikko's most glorious nightmares" and "an experience that is literally out of this world." Dork's Jamie Muir called the video a "must-watch" and "a gory out-of-this-world trip". In a less positive review of the video, Jezebel's Ashley Reese wrote, "I can take it or leave it." "Cry" was nominated for Best Pop Video - UK at the 2020 UK Music Video Awards.

== Personnel ==
Credits adapted from Tidal.

- Ashnikko – vocals, songwriting
- Grimes – vocals, songwriting
- Ebenezer – production, songwriting, programming, recording
- Matt Wolach – assistant production
- Melissa Storwick – songwriting
- John Greenham – mastering
- Mark "Spike" Stent – mixing

== Charts ==
Chart (2020)	Peak position
New Zealand Hot Singles (RMNZ)	37
