= Daisy (Ashnikko song) =

2020 single by Ashnikko

Single by Ashnikko

from the album Demidevil
- B-side: "Cry"
- Released: July 9, 2020
- Recorded: 2019
- Genre: Pop-trap; alternative pop
- Length: 2:26
- Label: Parlophone; Warner
- Songwriters: Ashton Casey; Thomas Slinger
- Producer: Slinger

Ashnikko singles chronology
"Cry" (2020)	"Daisy" (2020)	"Halloweenie III: Seven Days" (2020)

Alternative cover
- "Daisy 2.0" cover

Music video
- "Daisy" on YouTube

"Daisy" is a song by American singer-songwriter and rapper Ashnikko. It was released through Parlophone and Warner Music Group on July 9, 2020, as the second single from Ashnikko's debut mixtape Demidevil. The song was written by Ashnikko and Thomas Slinger and produced by Slinger. It is a pop-trap and alternative pop song with elements of EDM, and lyrically revolves around the character Daisy, whom Ashnikko created as a vigilante who kills rapists and leaves daisies behind as a calling card.

The music video for "Daisy" was released on August 7, 2020, and directed by Charlotte Rutherford. It was created in collaboration with Beats by Dre and TikTok, and heavily features user-generated content from TikTok. "Daisy" peaked at number 24 on the UK Singles Chart, becoming her first charting song as well as her first top-40 single in the United Kingdom. The song also peaked at number 3 on the Billboard Bubbling Under Hot 100 chart and number 74 on the Canadian Hot 100.

A remix of the song featuring Japanese vocaloid Hatsune Miku, "Daisy 2.0", was released on December 11, 2020. A cover by British band Wet Leg was released as a Spotify Single on September 21, 2022.

== Background ==
Upon releasing "Daisy", Ashnikko revealed that she had been waiting to release the song for a year. In an interview with Genius, she revealed that "Daisy" had been her favorite song she had ever written at the time of its release. The album cover for "Daisy" features the character of Daisy herself. For the "Daisy 2.0" cover and video, the character is seen as all grown up and with Hatsune Miku.

== Composition ==
"Daisy" has been described as an "empowering anthem", which combines pop-trap and alt-pop along with elements of EDM in its production. The song is written in the key of E♭ major. According to Ashnikko, "Daisy" was written from the perspective of the song's title character, Daisy, a rapist-killing vigilante and dominatrix who wears exclusively latex and platform shoes and leaves behind daisies as a calling card, hence the lyric, "I bite back, daisies on your nightstand".

== Critical reception ==
"Daisy" received positive reviews from music critics. Salvatore Maicki of The Fader praised the song, writing, "The song is as defiant as it is deranged, and we'll gladly lap up every second of it." Writing for God Is in the TV, Lloyd Best wrote, "Unhinged with a helping of genius and insanity from the jump, this trap-inspired anthem of empowerment is bold and energetic," and compared the song to the music of Grimes, Poppy, and Qveen Herby. The Line of Best Fit's Cerys Kenneally called the song "cold and empowering".

== Music video ==
The music video for "Daisy" was premiered on August 7, 2020, and directed by Charlotte Rutherford. The video was produced in collaboration with Beats Electronics and TikTok. The video consists of four different variations of Ashnikko, with each set representing the four new Beats Powerbeats Pro Headphone colors; Glacier Blue, Spring Yellow, Cloud Pink and Lava Red. For the video, Beats Electronics launched their first TikTok-based campaign, the #BeatsDaisyChallenge, which was spread out across four separate weeks, one for each color used in the video. The challenge encouraged people to create user-generated content based on the theme of the week, and some of the videos were selected to be incorporated into the music video itself.

=== Synopsis ===
The video begins with the "Glacier Blue" '90s/Y2K inspired theme, featuring Ashnikko balancing upon stacks of ice cubes in various positions, wearing a blue mesh unitard with metallic harnessing. The next theme that appears is the "Spring Yellow" version, which depicts her as a bumblebee sporting a striped bodysuit with spikes, sitting inside of a daisy. The "Cloud Pink" theme is shown next, and Ashnikko is shown tied up to a large screen, wearing long pink hair and a pink latex bodysuit. The fourth and final theme, "Lava Red", features Ashnikko in a red latex bodysuit in front of a chili pepper-themed backdrop, riding on top of a large plastic replica of a chili pepper which resembles a mechanical bull. The video also shows Ashnikko wearing the Beats Powerbeats Pro Headphones in each scene, and includes many of the TikTok videos created using the #BeatsDaisyChallenge hashtag.

=== 2.0. music video ===
In the video for "Daisy 2.0.", Ashnikko is animated in CGI and is dancing in a post-apocalyptic city with Hatsune Miku, and later in a swamp. During Hatsune Miku’s verse, she is shown floating near some trees without Ashnikko, and later floating in a bathtub filled with green water, with Ashnikko underwater. Then, they are shown inside a green ball in space, and the video ends with them on an island floating on air.

== Live performances ==
She performed the song for MTV on October 13, 2020, after being selected as their Push Artist of the Month for October 2020.

== Personnel ==
Credits adapted from Tidal.

- Ashton Casey – lead vocals, songwriting
- Slinger – songwriting, production, background vocals, drums, keyboards, sitar, synthesizer
- Matt Wolach – mixing assistant
- Chris Gehringer – mastering
- Mark "Spike" Stent – mixing

== Charts ==
Chart (2020)	Peak position
Australia (ARIA)	53
Belgium (Ultratip Bubbling Under Flanders)	16
Belgium (Ultratip Bubbling Under Wallonia)	40
Canada Hot 100 (Billboard)	74
Czech Republic Singles Digital (ČNS IFPI)	97
Global 200 (Billboard)	69
Greece International (IFPI)	36
Ireland (IRMA)	40
Mexico Ingles Airplay (Billboard)	24
New Zealand Hot Singles (RMNZ)	14
Portugal (AFP)	100
Romania (Airplay 100)	79
Scottish Singles Sales (Official Charts)	44
UK Singles (Official Charts)	24
US Bubbling Under Hot 100 (Billboard)	3
US Alternative Airplay (Billboard)	32
US Pop Airplay (Billboard)	35
US Rock & Alternative Airplay (Billboard)	40

== Certifications ==
Region	Certification	Certified units/sales
Austria (IFPI Austria)	Gold	15,000^{‡}
Brazil (Pro-Música Brasil)	3× Platinum	120,000^{‡}
Canada (Music Canada)	2× Platinum	160,000^{‡}
New Zealand (RMNZ)	Platinum	30,000^{‡}
Poland (ZPAV)	Platinum	20,000^{‡}
United Kingdom (BPI)	Gold	400,000^{‡}
United States (RIAA)	Platinum	1,000,000^{‡}
^{‡} Sales+streaming figures based on certification alone.

== Release history ==
Release dates and formats for "Daisy"
Region	Date	Format	Label	Version	Ref.
Various	July 9, 2020	Digital download; streaming	Parlophone; Warner	Original	
United States	November 10, 2020	Contemporary hit radio	Warner	Original	
Various	December 11, 2020	Digital download; streaming	Parlophone	2.0	
