= Weedkiller (album) =

Studio album by Ashnikko
- Released: August 25, 2023
- Recorded: 2021–2023
- Genre: Nu metal; trap metal; industrial pop; hyperpop; hip-hop
- Length: 33:05
- Label: Parlophone; Warner
- Producer: Ashnikko; Daniela Lalita; Dylan Brady; Ethel Cain; Frank Colucci; Micah Jasper; Oscar Scheller; Slinger

Ashnikko chronology
Demidevil (2021)	Weedkiller (2023)	Smoochies (2025)

Singles from Weedkiller
- 1. "You Make Me Sick!" Released: February 8, 2023; 2. "Worms" Released: March 2, 2023; 3. "Weedkiller" Released: April 6, 2023; 4. "Possession of a Weapon" Released: May 24, 2023; 5. "Cheerleader" Released: July 28, 2023

Weedkiller is the debut studio album by American singer-songwriter and rapper Ashnikko. It was released on August 25, 2023, through Parlophone and Warner Records.

The album has been supported by five singles; the lead single, "You Make Me Sick!", "Worms", "Weedkiller", "Possession of a Weapon" and "Cheerleader".

== Background ==
Weedkiller follows Ashnikko's 2021 debut mixtape Demidevil. Ashnikko then headlined her first tour to support the mixtape. "Panic Attacks in Paradise" and "Maggots" were released on September 29, 2021, as a double single. These were to promote an earlier work-in progress, which was intended as her debut album until it was scrapped. Ashnikko took a break from releasing music during 2021–2022 to start working on her debut from scratch.

On September 2, 2022, Ashnikko shared a link to Goga Sekulić's song "Sexy biznismen" (2006), dubbing it "album inspiration". On February 8, 2023, she released her new single "You Make Me Sick!" as the new lead single. She announced the release date, album cover, track list and world tour on March 1, 2023.

== Concept ==
The concept behind the album is described in press materials as being "a commentary on environmental disaster and the rapid evolution of technology" that tells "the story of a fae civilization occupied and destroyed by machines that feed on organic matter where the faerie protagonist seeks revenge by becoming part machine."

== Singles ==
"You Make Me Sick!" replaced "Panic Attacks in Paradise" and "Maggots" as the lead singles from the album. The track was released as the new lead single on February 8, 2023, and a music video for the single was released on the same day.

"Worms" was released on March 2, 2023, as the album's second single. Its official music video was released on March 8. The song's style was described as "sunny pop".

A month later, Ashnikko unveiled the song "Weedkiller", the title track from the album, returning to the post-industrial sound of "You Make Me Sick". The accompanying music video, filmed in Belgrade, was postponed for a week following the Belgrade school shooting.

On May 24, 2023, "Possession of a Weapon" was released as the fourth single from the album.

After previewing the song through her social media, Ashnikko announced "Cheerleader" as the fifth single for July 28.

== Critical reception ==
Professional ratings
Aggregate scores
Source	Rating
Metacritic	78/100
Review scores
Source	Rating
AllMusic	3/5 stars
Clash	8/10
DIY	5/5 stars
The Forty-Five	4/5 stars
The Line of Best Fit	8/10
MusicOMH	4/5 stars
NME	4/5 stars
Sputnikmusic	2.5/5

According to the review aggregator Metacritic, Weedkiller received "generally favorable reviews" based on a weighted average score of 78 out of 100 from 6 critic scores.

Otis Robinson of DIY writes that "Weedkiller is a funneling of rage – a quest to rediscover autonomy and cement identity - but despite the darkness is ridiculously fun, too. It's a triumphant debut – one that changes the game like a live wire in water." Writing for The Line of Best Fit, Elliot Burr describes the album as "a definitive project encapsulating body autonomy, queer love, humour and fury", and calls Ashnikko "a vocal chameleon whose performance stands out amongst the rich production traversing decaying foliage, fizzling suns and AI leaders." Alex Rigotti of NME wrote that "the boundary-smashing artist's songs refract themes of hope and survival through a multitude of moods and genres" and adds that "Weedkiller expertly weaves public and personal politics into an impressively captivating narrative for a debut.

In the review for the AllMusic, it was remarked that, "Ashnikko is part rage rapper, part feminist pop star, part disaffected rocker with emo-goth tendencies, but still somehow categorically none of the above."

== Track listing ==
Weedkiller track listing
No.	Title	Writer(s)	Producer(s)	Length
1.	"World Eater"	Ashton Casey; Oscar Scheller; Slinger; Michael Tucker	Slinger	2:27
2.	"You Make Me Sick!"	Casey; Scheller; Slinger	Slinger	2:18
3.	"Worms"	Casey; Slinger; Dylan Brady; Charlie Storwick	Slinger; Brady	2:28
4.	"Super Soaker" (featuring Daniela Lalita)	Casey; Slinger; Daniela Lalita	Slinger	2:27
5.	"Don't Look at It"	Casey; Scheller; Slinger	Slinger	2:09
6.	"Cheerleader"	Casey; Scheller; Slinger; Micah Jasper	Jasper; Scheller; Slinger	2:12
7.	"Moonlight Magic"	Casey; Slinger	Slinger	2:32
8.	"Miss Nectarine"	Casey; Camille Purcell; Slinger	Slinger; Scheller	2:18
9.	"Chokehold Cherry Python"	Casey; Scheller; Slinger	Slinger	2:39
10.	"Weedkiller"	Casey; Slinger	Slinger	2:06
11.	"Want It All"	Casey; Slinger; Everett Romano	Slinger	2:39
12.	"Possession of a Weapon"	Casey; Scheller; Lalita	Scheller; Lalita	2:35
13.	"Dying Star" (featuring Ethel Cain)	Casey; Ilsey Juber; Slinger; Ethel Cain	Casey; Frank Colucci; Cain; Scheller	4:15
Total length:				33:05

== Personnel ==
Musicians

- Ashnikko – lead vocals (1–13)
- Daniela Lalita – vocals (4), background vocals (12)
- Dylan Brady - guitar (3)
- Ethel Cain – vocals (13), guitar (13), piano (13)
- Micah Jasper - drums (6), synthesizer (6)
- Oscar Scheller – drums (6), synthesizer (12)
- Slinger – bass guitar (1–5, 7–8, 10–11, 13), guitar (1–3, 7, 9–11, 13), drums (1–5, 7–11), synthesizer (1–5, 7–11)

Technical

- Anthony Vilchis - engineering assistance, mixing assistance (3, 6)
- Chris Gehringer - masterer (1–3, 5–13)
- Frank Colucci - mixer (13)
- Manny Marroquin - mixer (3, 6)
- Matt Glasbey - engineer (13)
- Micah Jasper - engineer (6)
- Oscar Scheller – mixer, (8, 12), engineer (6, 8, 12)
- Slinger - mixer (1–2, 4–5, 7, 9–11), engineer (1–5, 7–11, 13)
- Trey Station - engineering assistance, mixing assistance (3, 6)
- Zach Pereyra - engineering assistance, mixing assistance (3, 6)

== Charts ==
Chart performance for Weedkiller
Chart (2023)	Peak position
Australian Albums (ARIA)	54
Belgian Albums (Ultratop Flanders)	157
Croatian International Albums (HDU)	24
German Albums (Offizielle Top 100)	35
Hungarian Physical Albums (MAHASZ)	3
Irish Albums (IRMA)	84
New Zealand Albums (RMNZ)	27
Scottish Albums (Official Charts)	4
UK Albums (Official Charts)	7
US Billboard 200	105
US Heatseekers Albums (Billboard)	2

== Release history ==
Release dates and formats for Weedkiller
Region	Date	Format(s)	Label	Ref.
Various	August 25, 2023	Digital download; streaming	Parlophone; Warner	
Various	August 25, 2023	CD; LP; cassette	Parlophone; Warner	
