= Cobrah =

Swedish rapper and singer (born 1996)

- Born: Clara Christensen; 15 October 1996 (age 30); Gothenburg, Sweden
- Origin: Stockholm, Sweden
- Genres: Electropop; deconstructed club; hip house; hip hop
- Occupations: Singer; songwriter; DJ; record producer; rapper
- Years active: 2018–present
- Labels: Artist Partner Group; Atlantic; Big Beat
- Website: https://www.cobrahcore.com/

Clara Christensen (born 15 October 1996), known professionally as Cobrah (formerly stylized in all caps), is a Swedish singer, songwriter and record producer. Prior to releasing music, Christensen worked as a primary school music teacher. She started using the name Cobrah in November 2018, with the release of her debut single "IDFKA", with the music video being nominated for Music Video of the Year at the Swedish Grammis.

Cobrah extended her discography in 2019 with an EP, Icon. Following the 2019 venture, she released another EP in 2021, eponymously titled Cobrah. It was nominated for Grammis 2022. The EP spawned the single "Good Puss", which later in 2022 got a remix featuring Cupcakke. Her EP Succubus won a Swedish Grammi 2024, in the category "Electro/Dance".

== Early life ==
Born Clara Christensen, she was raised in Gothenburg, Sweden. At the age of four, she moved from the urban part of the city to the suburban community. She was a flautist and in high school, studied musical theatre. As a teenager, she expressed adoration for goth clothing. As a result, she hid these pieces of clothing in her backpack and changed into them before going to school. In 2017, she moved to Berlin in order to find music producers to collaborate with.

== Career ==
=== 2017–2019: Early career and Icon ===
After moving to Berlin, Cobrah connected with various music producers and began experimenting with numerous types of music. She eventually stuck with the music producers Hannes Roover and Isaac Hördegård, the former of whom she met in Sweden before moving to Berlin. COBRAH created her record label, GAGBALL Records, to release her first single in 2018. She released her debut single, "IDFKA" (an acronym for "I Don't Fucking Know Anymore"), in 2018. In a 2020 interview about her debut single she said, "Like, honestly, everything... That song just keeps giving me a new meaning every week. It was about growing up and having a very ambivalent relationship with sex and romance. As I think most teenagers do, especially teenage girls that are looking for a place of belonging. It's easy to be taken advantage of, and it's very hard when you're a kid to realize when it happens." She released more singles throughout 2019 to promote the upcoming release of her debut EP, Icon. The singles include "Wet" and "U Know Me". After the promotion cycle of Icon, she released the single "Tea" in collaboration with British radio station Rinse FM and performed with Charli XCX.

=== 2020–2022: Cobrah ===
She released the single "Debut" in 2020, which was followed by critical acclaim. Paper praised Cobrah's style as "intense and visceral" and did an interview with her prior to release. She released her self-titled EP on her label GAGBALL on 21 May 2021. She followed up the release of Cobrah with the "Good PusS" remix, featuring Cupcakke. Cobrah was included on the 2022 edition of NME's essential new artists for the year.

=== 2023–2024: Succubus and world tour ===
In 2023, she gave her distribution rights to Atlantic Records and released "Suck" in June 2023, her first single with them. On 11 August, the second single, "Manic", was released and a third, "Feminine Energy", was released on 8 September alongside the announcement of her third EP, Succubus, which was released on 13 October. Succubus then won best Electro/Dance album of the year at the 2024 Swedish Grammis.

On 12 October, Cobrah announced a 14-date tour for 2024 across North America starting on 22 February in Vancouver and ending on 19 March in Atlanta. Later on, she also extended the tour across Europe after performing at two Australian headline shows and four festivals.

In 2024, her 2022 single "Brand New Bitch" was used as a theme, and in the marketing and trailers, for Yorgos Lanthimos' film Kinds of Kindness. In the film, the song appears in a scene where the lead actress Emma Stone dances energetically to the song.

=== 2025–present: Torn ===
On 29 October 2025, Cobrah released the single "Torn", which would later become the lead single from her debut album of the same name. On 29 January 2026, Cobrah announced the album for a 6 March 2026 release. The second single, "Hush", was released the same day. The third single, "Dog", was released on 2 March 2026. The music video accompanied the album release on 6 March. The "Torn Tour" was announced on 2 February 2026.

== Influences ==
Cobrah told Vogue Adria: "Although I make electronic music, and it sounds completely different [from Kate Bush's], I think when you're an artist, it's important to come into the music industry with an artistic, new, exciting point of view. And artists like Kate Bush really inspired me to find that within myself..." Cobrah makes music influenced by the BDSM scene in Stockholm, Sweden. She became immersed in the BDSM scene after she connected with photographer Katrin Unge.

== Personal life ==
Cobrah worked as a teacher until late 2020.

== Discography ==
=== Studio albums ===
Title	Album details
Torn	Released: 6 March 2026; Label: Gagball, Atlantic; Format: CD, LP, digital download, streaming

=== Extended plays ===
Title	EP details
Icon	Released: 29 March 2019; Label: Self-released; Format: Digital download, streaming
Cobrah	Released: 12 May 2021; Label: Self-released; Format: Digital download, streaming
Succubus	Released: 13 October 2023; Label: Gagball, Atlantic; Format: CD, LP, digital download, streaming
Succubus XXXtended	Released: 26 July 2024; Label: Gagball, Atlantic; Format: Digital download, streaming

=== Singles ===
List of singles as lead artist
Title	Year	Album
"IDFKA"	2018	Icon
"Wet"	2019	Icon
"U Know Me"	2019	Icon
"Tea"	2019	Non-album single
"Debut"	2020	Cobrah
"Dip N Drip"	2021	Cobrah
"Good Puss" (Note: Solo version of "Good Puss" is included on the Cobrah EP while remix with Cupcakke is a stand-alone release.) (solo or remix with Cupcakke)	2021	Cobrah
"Brand New Bitch"	2022	Kinds of Kindness
"Mami" (with Chris Lorenzo)	2022	Non-album single
"Suck"	2023	Succubus
"Manic"	2023	Succubus
"Feminine Energy"	2023	Succubus
"Record Deal"	2024	Non-album single
"QT" (with Lsdxoxo)	2025	DGTL ANML
"Torn"	2025	Torn
"Hush"	2026	Torn
"Dog"	2026	Torn
"Sign from God"	2026	Torn Apart

=== Other charted songs ===
List of songs, with selected chart positions, showing year released and album name
Title	Year	Peak chart positions		Album
Title	Year	NGR	NGR Air.	Album
"Fantasy" (Demi Lovato featuring Cobrah)	2026	98	47	It's Not That Deep (Unless You Want It to Be)

=== Remixes ===
Title	Artist(s)	Year
"Tsunami"	Yung Titties, BAZOKA	2018
"Wizz"	Coucou Chloe	2022

=== Guest appearances ===
Title	Year	Album
"Wet Like" (Ashnikko featuring Cobrah)	2025	Smoochies
"Fantasy" (Demi Lovato featuring Cobrah)	2026	It's Not That Deep (Unless You Want It to Be)

== Awards and nominations ==
=== Berlin Music Video Awards ===
The Berlin Music Video Awards is an international festival that promotes the art of music videos.

Year	Nominated work	Award	Result	Ref.
2026	"Hush"	Most Bizarre	Nominated	
