= Stupid (Ashnikko song) =

2019 single by Ashnikko

Single by Ashnikko featuring Yung Baby Tate

from the EP Hi, It's Me
- Released: October 22, 2019
- Genre: Industrial hip-hop; pop rap
- Length: 2:47
- Label: Digital Picnic; Parlophone
- Songwriters: Ashton Casey; Tate Farris; Oscar Scheller
- Producer: Oscar Scheller

Ashnikko singles chronology
"Hi It's Me" (2019)	"Stupid" (2019)	"Working Bitch" (2019)

Music video
- "Stupid" on YouTube

"Stupid" (stylized in all caps) is a song by American rapper Ashnikko featuring American rapper Yung Baby Tate from the former's third EP, Hi It's Me. It was released under Digital Picnic and Parlophone Records on July 12, 2019. Produced by Oscar Scheller, "Stupid" became popular on the video-sharing app TikTok, where celebrities like Miley Cyrus and Cody Simpson have danced to the song. It has been described as industrial and pop-rap. The song received positive reviews from music critics, who praised the song for its production, songwriting and vocal performances.

== Reception ==
Since September 2019, the song has been used in over 400,000 videos on TikTok, and has gained over 80 million streams on Spotify alone. Miley Cyrus gained over 2.3 million likes when she lip-synced the song on a TikTok video with Cody Simpson. The song topped the Billboard Bubbling Under Hot 100 chart, the Billboard Bubbling Under R&B/Hip-Hop chart, and the Spotify Viral 50 chart.

Cat Zhang from Pitchfork described the song as a "venemous [sic] rap song animated by its snide dismissal of men, ghoulish theatrics, and Pornhub shoutouts." Robin Murray from Clash said "[the song is] a sign of her personal and creative autonomy, with Ashnikko placing herself front and centre in a striking but de-sexualised way."

Ashnikko responded to the song's performance online when she took to Instagram to write, "Since 'Stupid' is having a weird little moment on tik tok I think that it's only fair that I force u all to help me actualise my lifelong dream of going viral". When asked in an interview with Billboard about how the song got the reaction that it did, Ashnikko said "It's quite a divisive song, isn't it? The lyrics are straight-to-the-point and blunt and honest."

== Credits and personnel ==
Credits adapted from Tidal:

- Oscar Scheller – producer, mixer, programmer, recorded by, writer
- Ashnikko – vocals, writer
- Yung Baby Tate – vocals, writer
- Zach Nicholis – engineer

== Charts ==
Chart (2019)	Peak position
Canada Hot 100 (Billboard)	63
Ireland (IRMA)	93
New Zealand Hot Singles (RMNZ)	29
US Bubbling Under Hot 100 (Billboard)	1
US Bubbling Under R&B/Hip-Hop Singles (Billboard)	1

== Certifications ==
Region	Certification	Certified units/sales
Brazil (Pro-Música Brasil)	Platinum	40,000^{‡}
Canada (Music Canada)	Platinum	80,000^{‡}
New Zealand (RMNZ)	Gold	15,000^{‡}
Poland (ZPAV)	Gold	25,000^{‡}
United Kingdom (BPI)	Silver	200,000^{‡}
United States (RIAA)	Platinum	1,000,000^{‡}
^{‡} Sales+streaming figures based on certification alone.
