= Gonzalo Torres (actor) =

Peruvian actor

- Born: May 20, 1969; Lima, Peru
- Other name: Gonzalete
- Education: Markham College
- Occupations: Actor, presenter, musician
- Years active: 1990–present
- Employer: TV Perú
- Known for: Pataclaun
- Spouse: Muss Hernández (m. 1996)
- Awards: Personalidad Meritoria de la Cultura (2023)

Gonzalo Miguel Torres del Pino (born May 20, 1969) is a Peruvian actor, comedian, television presenter, musician, announcer and historian. He is best known for his role as Gonzalete in Pataclaun, a TV series that aired from 1997 until 1999, also hosting documentary shows A la vuelta de la esquina (2005–2021) and Sucedió en el Perú (2000–present). He was also a member of local bands Nosequien y Los Nosecuantos and La Liga del Sueño.

== Early life ==
Torres was born in Lima on May 20, 1969, the youngest son of parents Juan Luis Torres Higueras (1933–1992) and María del Carmen Del Pino Abad. His father was an architect and a partial namesake of Arana Orrego Torres, the architectural firm behind the original design of Jorge Chávez International Airport. Both of his parents were from Callao, a city next to Lima. His father was from downtown Callao, while his mother was from La Punta. The family moved prior to Torres' birth.

He studied at Markham College, a bilingual international school, through which he became socially acquainted with the Sodalitium Christianae Vitae, without being a member.

== Career ==
=== Musical career ===
A musician who would later become a well-known figure of Peruvian rock, he joined local bands Nosequien y Los Nosecuantos (1991) and La Liga del Sueño (1994–1996) as a bass player. Other members of the latter band included Pelo Madueño and future co-star Johanna San Miguel.

=== Acting career ===
Torres started working as an actor in 1992. His television debut was as a cast member of Pataclaun, a sitcom that ran from 1997 to 1999, which launched its cast into national stardom. He acquired the nickname "Gonzalete" after his character in the show, from which he attempted to distance himself before ultimately embracing it.

In 2023, he was distinguished as a "Personalidad Meritoria de la Cultura", a title granted by the Ministry of Culture.

== Personal life ==
Torres married Muss Hernández on July 6, 1996, at a ceremony that took place at the Casa Hacienda San José, in El Carmen District, Chincha. Hernández was born in Venezuela in 1968, having emigrated with her family to Peru when she was 10 years old. The pair met while working at Pataclaun.

Torres is an active supporter of the Sport Boys, a football club from Callao.

== Filmography ==
=== Film ===
Year	Title	Role	Notes
2005	Piratas en el Callao		Voice
2008	Un cuerpo desnudo	Doctore	
2008	Cu4tro	Pedro	
2011	Las malas intenciones		
2013	¡Asu mare!	Teacher	Cameo
2015	¡Asu mare! 2	English teacher	Cameo
2016	Locos de amor	Ignacio	
2018	¡Asu mare! 3	Flamenco teacher	Cameo
2019	Recontraloca	Psychiatrist	
2019	Papá X Tres	Luis Mario	
2021	Un mundo para Julius	Juan Lastarria	
2022	Igualita A Mí		
2023	El Año del Tigre		

=== Television ===
Year	Title	Role	Notes
1996–1998	Pataclaun	Gonzalete	TV adaptation of stage show
2002	Qué Buena Raza		
2003–2004	Carita de Atún		
2005–2021	A la vuelta de la Esquina	Presenter	Documentary programme
2024–present	Sucedió en el Perú	Presenter	Documentary programme

=== Theatre ===
Year	Title	Role	Notes
1993–1999	Pataclaun		
2002–2004	Vestido de luces		
2005	El guía del Hermitage		
2005	El perro del hortelano		
2006	Morir de Amor		
2008	Noche de Tontos		
2009	El Método Grönholm	Enrique Font	
2009	La Pulga en la Oreja		
2011	El carvernícola		One-man show.
2014	Las Mataviejas		
2019–2020	Perfectos Desconocidos	Lucas	

== See also ==
- Carlos Alcántara (actor)
- Johanna San Miguel
