= Loco de Amor =

Loco de Amor (masculine), or Loca de Amor (feminine) may refer to:

== Television ==
- Locas de amor, an Argentine television series

== Films ==
- Locos de amor, a 2016 Peruvian jukebox musical romantic comedy film directed by Frank Pérez-Garland
  - Locos de amor 2, the 2018 sequel to this same film
  - Locos de amor 3, the 2020 sequel to these same films

== Music ==
=== Albums ===
- Loco de Amor (album), 2014, by Juanes
- Loco de Amor, 1992, by Nino Segarra

=== Songs ===
- "Loco de Amor" (Jerry Rivera song), 1996
- "Loca de Amor", 2004, by Belle Perez from The Best of Belle Perez
- "Loco de Amor", 1998, by Café Quijano from Café Quijano
- "Loco de Amor", 1989, by David Byrne from Rei Momo
- "Loco de Amor", 2014, by Juanes from Loco de Amor (album)
- "Loca de Amor", 1998, by Marta Sánchez from Desconocida

== See also ==
- Loco de Amor
- Loca de Amor
