= Locos de amor 3 =

- Theatrical release poster
- Directed by: Frank Pérez-Garland
- Written by: Carlos Galiano
- Produced by: Jorge Barboza; Marcos Camacho; Jorge Constantino; Diego Vives
- Starring: Ebelin Ortiz; Patricia Portocarrero; Katia Condos; Aldo Miyashiro; Leonardo Torres Vilar; Orlando Fundichely; Rebeca Escribens; Sergio Galliani
- Cinematography: Roberto Maceda Kohatsu
- Edited by: Angela Vera Temoche
- Production company: Tondero Producciones
- Distributed by: Tondero Producciones
- Release date: 13 February 2020
- Running time: 100 minutes
- Country: Peru
- Language: Spanish
- Box office: $657,239

Locos de amor 3 (lit. 'Crazy in love 3') is a 2020 Peruvian jukebox musical romantic comedy film directed by Frank Pérez-Garland and written by Carlos Galiano. It is the third part of Locos de amor (2016) and Locos de amor 2 (2018). This time it stars Katia Condos, Patricia Portocarrero and Ebelin Ortiz.

== Synopsis ==
This is the story of 3 best friends on the verge of 50, who have something in common: they suffer for love. Sarah has just made one of her dreams come true: to get married; but on her wedding day she discovers that her husband is unfaithful to her. Marta faces divorce proceedings, and Doris deals with her routine married life. Will these three women be able to achieve the maturity they need to solve their love conflicts?

== Cast ==
The actors participating in this film are:

- Ebelin Ortiz as Sarah
- Katia Condos as Marta
- Patricia Portocarrero as Doris
- Aldo Miyashiro
- Leonardo Torres Vilar
- Orlando Fundichely
- Rebeca Escribens
- Sergio Galliani

== Production ==
Locos de amor 3 was filmed in mid-August 2019 over four weeks in different locations such as Magdalena, Miraflores, Barranco, Residencial San Felipe, Surco and La Encantada de Villa.

== Release ==
Locos de amor 3 premiered on 13 February 2020, in Peruvian theaters, but was quickly withdrawn from the theaters due to the COVID-19 pandemic. It was later re-released online on 9 May 2020, on the Netzun platform.

== Reception ==
Locos de amor 3 drew 205,000 viewers in its first weekend in theaters. It exceeded 400,000 viewers in its second weekend.

== Sequel ==
On September 3, 2024, filming of a fourth installment titled Locos de amor: mi primer amor, began in Punta del Este, Uruguay, this time starring Brando Gallesi, Thiago Vernal, Arianna Fernández, Ray del Castillo, María Gracia Mora, Alexia Barnechea, Vasco Rodríguez, Monserrat Brugué, Job Mansilla, Quique Niza and Juan Ramos. The film was released on June 26, 2025, in Peruvian theaters.
