= Pataclaun =

Peruvian improvisation sitcom

- Genre: Sitcom
- Directed by: July Naters
- Country of origin: Peru
- Original language: Spanish
- No. of seasons: 2
- No. of episodes: 91

Original release
- Network: Frecuencia Latina
- Release: 30 November 1997 – 19 December 1999

Pataclaun is a Peruvian sitcom, produced by the cultural association by the same name. Originally broadcast from 1997 until 1999 on Frecuencia Latina, the series was characterized by irreverent black humour and its ability to mock Peruvian society. It stars Wendy Ramos, Carlos Alcántara, Monserrat Brugué, Carlos Carlín, Johanna San Miguel and Gonzalo Torres. Ramos, alongside July Naters, is also the scriptwriter of the show.

The series is characterized by an abundant use of idioms and slang expressions, while offering a biting critique to Peru's social and political problems. The actors, strong of their experience in theater, contribute significantly to the series originality through improvisation. The pilot episode, named ‘Wendy is Pregnant’ was later included as the first episode of the first season.

The series consists of two seasons, originally broadcast every Sunday at 7 pm. In the years following the series finale, there has been some controversy due to the missing payment of royalties to the actors despite the show's countless reruns on Latina and Panamericana Television channels. In 2023, the organisation Inter Artis filed a formal complaint on this issue.

Pataclaun was broadcast in other hispanophone countries such as Ecuador and Colombia.

== Plot ==
Wendy Janeth and Machín Alberto, a recently married couple, buy a small house on top of a hill, only to discover that three tenants already reside inside. Queca becomes Wendy's best friend and advisor. Tony, the show's ‘antagonist’, takes advantage of opportune moments to woo Wendy. Gonzalete, better known as ‘El curita’, attempts to impose morals and good manners, though he harbors a perverted side. Monchi, Wendy and Machín's daughter, is very attached to Gonzalete and is obsessed with money.

== Reception ==
Pataclaun was praised for the actors' performances and its ability to combine comedy with social satire. The programme has received critical acclaim on film and TV series portals; Filmaffinity reports a rating of 7.4/10. It was considered by University of Lima's Anexo magazine as the most important national production in the history of Peruvian television.

== Offshoots ==
In 2003, former cast members launched a new series, Carita de atún, attempting to replicate the success of Pataclaun. However, despite being made in the same format and on the same channel, the show failed to achieve the high ratings of the original series.

Most of Pataclaun cast reunited in the film ¡Asu mare! (2013), a Carlos Alcántara's autofiction that was a great success in Peru. Wendy Ramos, Carlos Carlín and Johanna San Miguel also participate in the films A los 40 and in ¡Asu mare! 2 and ¡Asu mare! 3.
