= ¡Asu mare! 3 =

2018 Peruvian comedy film

- Theatrical release poster
- Directed by: Jorge Ulloa
- Written by: Carlos Alcántara; Rasec Barragán; Carlos Galiano
- Produced by: Carlos Alcántara; Jorge Barboza
- Starring: Carlos Alcántara Vilar; Emilia Drago; Anahí de Cárdenas; Denisse Dibós; Javier Delgiudice; Melania Urbina
- Cinematography: Alejandro Chauvin
- Production company: Tondero Films
- Distributed by: Tondero Films
- Release date: 22 November 2018
- Running time: 102 minutes
- Country: Peru
- Language: Spanish

¡Asu mare! 3 is a 2018 Peruvian comedy film directed by Jorge Ulloa. Sequel to ¡Asu mare! and Asu mare 2, starring Carlos Alcántara. It premiered on 22 November 2018 in Peruvian theaters.

== Plot ==
Asu mare! 3 is set in Miami to where the protagonist obtained a visa to travel. Cachín and Emilia expect a new addition to the lives of the newlyweds by taking a vacation with friends. However, they run into his ex-girlfriend unexpectedly and plans change. To avoid misunderstandings with the Alcántaras and Rizo-Patrón, the spouses must live with the past of Brenda and her new son.

== Cast ==
- Carlos Alcántara as himself (Cachín, "Machín")
- Emilia Drago as Emilia Rizo-Patron
- Andrés Salas as Jaime Culicich "El Culi"
- Anahí de Cárdenas as Pamela (Emilia's friend)
- Ana Cecilia Natteri as Doña Chabela
- Denisse Dibós as Elena Rizo-Patrón (Mother of Emilia)
- Javier Delgiudice as Felipe Rizo-Patrón (Father of Emilia)
- Franco Cabrera as "Lechuga" (Cachín's friend)
- Ricardo Mendoza as "Tarrón" (Cachín's friend)
- Miguel Vergara as "El Chato" (Cachín's friend)
- Patricia Portocarrero as Florencia (Employee of the Rizo-Boss)
- Melania Urbina as Brenda
- Alessandro Durand as Kevin
- Pietro Sibille as Taxi driver
- Haydeé Cáceres
- Katy Esquivel
- Orlando Herrera
- Katia Condos
- Rodolfo Carrion "Felpudini"
- Christian Meier
- Monserrat Brugué
- Carlos Carlín: Doctor
- Wendy Ramos
- Johanna San Miguel
- Gonzalo Torres
- Daniel Marquina
- Lilian Schiappa as Secretary

== Production ==
After the success of the first 2 parts, Carlos Alcántara announced a third installment to "give a definitive ending to the story". The shooting of the film began in May 2018. The director is Jorge Ulloa, who directs Enchufe.tv, replacing Ricardo Maldonado. According to Ulloa, he first met Alcántará after the success of Patacláun in Ecuador.

== Reception ==
Attendance in its first week of release was 540,000 viewers, down from its prequel which reached 700,000. It ended with more than 2 million, the second most watched of 2018 and surpassed by Avengers: Infinity War. On 13 June 2020, after its re-release for América Televisión, it was the most watched of the day with 18 points according to RPP. It became the highest-grossing film of 2018 with a gross of $2.3 million.

== Spin-off sequel ==
Despite Carlos Alcántara's initial refusal, a fourth film by ¡Asu mare! was confirmed at the end of 2021 and it was declared that it would be a spin-off film titled ¡Asu mare! Los amigos. Its premiere is scheduled for February 9, 2023 in Peruvian theaters.
