= Locos de amor 2 =

- Theatrical release poster
- Directed by: Frank Pérez-Garland
- Written by: Bruno Ascenzo; Mariana Silva
- Produced by: Miguel Valladares Vives
- Starring: Carlos Alcántara Vilar; Vanessa Saba; Marco Zunino; Johanna San Miguel; Wendy Ramos; Julián Gil; Paul Vega; Erika Villalobos; Bruno Ascenzo
- Cinematography: Pepe Guevara
- Edited by: Angela Vera Temoche
- Music by: José Manuel Barrios
- Production company: Tondero Producciones
- Distributed by: Tondero Producciones
- Release date: February 14, 2018
- Running time: 104 minutes
- Country: Peru
- Language: Spanish

Locos de amor 2 (lit. 'Crazy in love 2') is a 2018 Peruvian jukebox musical romantic comedy film directed by Frank Pérez-Garland and written by Bruno Ascenzo and Mariana Silva. The film is a sequel to Locos de amor and stars Carlos Alcántara, Marco Zunino, Paul Vega, Vanessa Saba, Bruno Ascenzo, Johanna San Miguel, Wendy Ramos and Erika Villalobos. It was premiered on February 14, 2018, in Peruvian theaters.

== Synopsis ==
What happens if you put together a heartbroken music lover with a jilted romance counselor and her hot friend fresh from Miami? Or a woman desperate to be a mother with a single father and a failed husband in the middle? Or a woman who just wants to have fun with a man who only thinks of her? The result is a very funny romantic comedy where the characters discover that it is never too late to go crazy with love.

== Cast ==
- Carlos Alcántara as Vicente
- Marco Zunino as Santiago
- Vanessa Saba as Daniela
- Paul Vega as Luis Izquierdo
- Johanna San Miguel as Loneliness
- Julián Gil as Gianprieto
- Wendy Ramos as Marisol
- Erika Villalobos as Patricia
- Nicolás Galindo as Engineer
- Mayra Goñi
- Bernie Peace
- Bruno Ascenzo

== Production ==
The filming of the film began in August 2017, where new actors such as Marco Zunino, Vanessa Saba, Paul Vega, among others, joined. The film was filmed in different locations, such as Lima, Callao, Miraflores, Magdalena, Los Olivos and La Punta. The filming ended in mid-September after 5 weeks of filming.

== Soundtrack ==
- Todo se derrumbó dentro de mí by Emmanuel
- ¿Cómo te va, mi amor? by Pandora
- O quizás simplemente le regale una rosa by Leonardo Favio
- Lluvia by Luis Ángel
- ¿A quién le importa? by Alaska y Dinarama
- Sólo pienso en ti by Guillermo Dávila
- Hoy tengo ganas de ti by Miguel Gallardo
- Maldita primavera by Javiera y Los Imposibles
- Detrás de mi ventana by Yuri
- Será porque te amo by Ricchi e Poveri
- Vale la pena by Marcos Llunas
- Amante bandido by Miguel Bosé
- Te amaré by Miguel Bosé
- Debes comprenderme by i Pooh
- Un montón de estrellas by Polo Montañez
- Yo no te pido la luna by Daniela Romo
- Locos de amor by Yordano

== Sequel ==
In mid-August 2019, the start of filming for the third part for 2020, Locos de amor 3, was announced, this time starring Sergio Galliani, Aldo Miyashiro, Orlando Fundichely, Leonardo Torres Vilar, Ebelin Ortiz, Katia Condos, Patricia Portocarrero and Rebeca Escribens. It was released on February 13, 2020.
