= Monserrat Brugué =

Peruvian actress

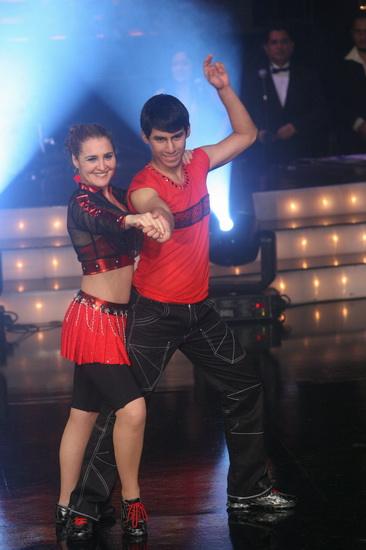
- Born: Montserrat María Brugué Inurritegui; 4 March 1967 (age 59)
- Occupation: Actress
- Known for: Role as "Monchi" on Patacláun
- Spouse: Single
- Children: Munay Ramos Brugué (2005)

Montserrat María Brugué Inurritegui (born 4 March 1967), more widely known as Monserrat Brugué or Monchi, is a Peruvian actress with more than 30 years of experience in the art world, covering work in television, cinema, and theatre. She is most known for her role as Monchi in the Peruvian TV show Patacláun.

== Biography ==
Brugué made her debut in acting in 1984 when she appeared in the Peruvian telenovela Carmín as its villain, Monchi, a name that come to define her career. Later, she joined the theater group Telba and began studying acting with Alberto Ísola. Brugué found fame thanks to her role as Monchi in the TV show Pataclaun (1997-1999), where she worked alongside Carlos Alcántara Vilar, Wendy Ramos, Johanna San Miguel, Carlos Carlín, and Gonzalo Torres. Brugué reprised the role of Monchi be for the television show El Santo Convento on América Televisión. The character would also appear in the 2015 comedy film ¡Asu mare! 2.

Brugué came in fifth place on the Peruvian dance reality show Bailando por un Sueño, hosted by Gisela Valcárcel, after three months of competition.

In 2008, she moved her family to Cusco to work as a theater teacher, but would return to Lima to act in a production of August: Osage County.

In 2016, Brugué returned to her role as Monchi for a YouTube series set in the universe of Patacláun called Los Planes De Ricky, or Ricky's Plans, aimed at educating children of sound financial practices. Funded by the Peruvian Bank of Credit, the show broke 3,000,000 views.

== Credits ==
=== Television ===
- 1985: Carmín as Monchi
- 1992: La Perricholi
- 1993: Las Mujeres de mi vida
- 1996: Travesuras con Monchi, Presented
- 1997-1999: Pataclaun as Monchi
- 2003: Carita de atún as Madrina
- 2007: Perú Campeón as Sofía
- 2007-2008: El santo convento as Monchi (Patacláun)
- 2008: Bailando por un Sueño, Contestant, placed fifth
- 2014: Conversando con la Luna as Mamá
- 2016: Los Planes De Ricky as Monchi (Patacláun)
- 2017: Mujercitas as Paloma Terranova
- 2017: Pensión Soto as Cucha
- 2020: Princesas as Ada Coronado
- 2026: Valentina valiente as Renée Dumont

=== Films ===
- 2001: Bala Perdida as Giovanna
- 2004: Doble Juego as Reina
- 2015: ¡Asu mare! 2 as an additional tertiary character and Monchi
- 2024: Mistura as Perm Lady
- 2025: Locos de amor: mi primer amor as Miss Pacca

=== Theater ===
- 1993: Pataclaun en la ciudad
- 1994: Pataclaun en...Rollado
- 1996: Pataclaun busca pareja
- 1997: El juicio final
- 2000: Pataclaun en...Venta
- 2002: Othello
- 2003: Princesa Cero
- 2005: Manzanas para recordar
- 2006: El círculo de arena
- 2007: Pinoccio
- 2008: Morir de amor
- 2008: The Feast of the Goat
- 2009: Una gran comedia Romana
- 2010: Cocina y zona de servicio (as Martina)
- 2010: August: Osage County (as Elí)
- 2013: Rosa de dos aromas (as Marlene)
- 2013: Sombras (as Mother)
- 2013: El círculo de arena
- 2014: Japón (as Ventura)
