= ¡Asu mare! Los amigos =

- Theatrical release poster
- Directed by: Carlos Alcántara
- Written by: Rasec Barragán; Renato Fernandez; Marco Rubina
- Produced by: Jorge Constantino; Milagros Valladares
- Starring: Andrés Salas; Franco Cabrera; Emilram Cossio; Miguel Vergara
- Cinematography: Mauro Veloso
- Edited by: Eduardo "Chino" Pinto
- Music by: Jorge Miranda
- Production company: Tondero Producciones
- Distributed by: Tondero Producciones
- Release date: February 9, 2023
- Running time: 120 minutes
- Country: Peru
- Language: Spanish

¡Asu mare! Los amigos (lit. 'Asu mare! The friends') is a 2023 Peruvian comedy film directed by Carlos Alcántara (in his directorial debut) and written by Rasec Barragán, Renato Fernandez and Marco Rubina. It is a spin-off film from the film trilogy !Asu mare!, which also serves as a sequel to the final film. It stars Andrés Salas, Franco Cabrera, Emilram Cossio and Miguel Vergara. It premiered on February 9, 2023 in Peruvian theaters.

== Synopsis ==
Cachin's friends are back. After overcoming many challenges, an inheritance will put them to the test, facing situations and dark characters that will try to boycott one of their dreams.

== Cast ==
The actors participating in this film are:

- Andrés Salas as “El Culi”
- Franco Cabrera as "Lechuga"
- Emilram Cossio as “Poroto”
- Miguel Vergara as "El Chato"

== Production ==
After the premiere of ¡Asu mare! 3, Carlos Alcantara, the protagonist of the trilogy, stated that there were no plans for a fourth installment. However, at the end of 2021, production of a fourth installment focused on Cachin's friends was confirmed with the preliminary title of ¡Asu mare! 4 and Chesu mare and a release planned sometime in 2022.

On March 3, 2022, Tondero Productions announced that Carlos Alcantara would direct the new film and that it would be released at the end of 2022. In June 2022, actor Ricardo Mendoza declared that he would not star in ¡Asu mare! 4 after a controversy surrounding his comedy web program Hablando huevadas in which he made offensive jokes.

=== Filming ===
Principal photography began on September 12, 2022, and ended on October 9 of the same year.

== Reception ==
On its first day, the film was seen by 55,000 viewers, making it the most successful Peruvian premiere since the start of the COVID-19 pandemic. It drew nearly 205,000 viewers by the end of its opening weekend.
