= Wake Show =

- Promotional release poster
- Directed by: Aldo Miyashiro
- Screenplay by: Aldo Miyashiro; Abril Cárdenas; Erika Villalobos
- Based on: Función velorio by Aldo Miyashiro
- Produced by: Gilberto Nue
- Starring: Reynaldo Arenas; Ximena Arroyo; Haysen Percovich; Manuel Calderón; Virginia Mayo; Diego Pérez; Christopher Gaona
- Cinematography: Roberto Maceda Kohatsu
- Edited by: Angela Vera Temoche
- Production company: AMA Producciones
- Release date: October 23, 2020 (AFF)
- Running time: 117 minutes
- Country: Peru
- Language: Spanish
- Budget: $450.000

Wake Show (Spanish: Función velorio, lit. 'Wake function') is a 2020 Peruvian drama film directed by Aldo Miyashiro from a screenplay he co-wrote with Abril Cárdenas and Erika Villalobos, based on the play of the same name by Miyashiro. The cast is made up of Reynaldo Arenas, Ximena Arroyo, Haysen Percovich, Manuel Calderón, Virginia Mayo, Diego Pérez and Christopher Gaona.

== Synopsis ==
Leonardo Oviedo is an ambitious theater director, whose works have not achieved the success he dreamed of. Looking for some recognition, he decides to write a play for four characters; a single performance, where all the actors have to die on stage. He chooses an old alcoholic actor, an overweight actress, an endearing boy with an intellectual disability, and a black actor, who has only been chosen because of the color of his skin. The work generates a media stir in both the good and bad sense, while the director is willing to fulfill this repugnant artistic ideal.

== Cast ==
- Reynaldo Arenas
- Ximena Arroyo
- Haysen Percovich
- Manuel Calderón
- Virginia Mayo
- Diego Pérez as Luchito
- Christopher Gaona as Julian
- Lucho Cáceres
- Emilram Cossío
- Tati Alcántara

== Release ==
It had its world premiere on October 23, 2020, at the 27th Austin Film Festival, then screened in early June 2021 at the New York City Independent Film Festival, in early August of the same year at the 39th Flickers' Rhode Island International Film Festival, and at the end of March 2022 at the 6th Houston Latin Film Festival.

== Accolades ==
Year	Award / Festival	Category	Recipient	Result	Ref.
2020	27th Austin Film Festival	Narrative Feature Award	Wake Show	Nominated	
2021	39th Flickers’ Rhode Island International Film Festival	Best Narrative Feature - First Prize	Wake Show	Won	
