= Igualita a mí =

Igualita a mí may refer to:

- Igualita a mí (2010 film), an Argentine comedy film
- Igualita a mí (2022 film), a Peruvian comedy film, a remake of the above
