= Seven Seeds =

- Theatrical release poster
- Spanish: Siete semillas
- Directed by: Daniel Rodríguez Risco
- Written by: Daniel Rodríguez Risco; Gonzalo Rodríguez Risco
- Based on: El secreto de las 7 semillas by David Fischman
- Produced by: Marcos Camacho; Jorge Constantino; José María Navarro Almonacid; Daniel Rodríguez Risco; Miguel Valladares
- Starring: Carlos Alcántara
- Music by: Jose Chick Aguirre
- Production companies: Tondero Films; DirecTV Cinema
- Distributed by: Meaningful Entertainment
- Release date: October 20, 2016
- Running time: 95 minutes
- Country: Peru
- Language: Spanish

Seven Seeds (Spanish: Sietes semillas) is a 2016 Peruvian comedy-drama film directed by Daniel Rodríguez Risco and written by Daniel & Gonzalo Rodríguez Risco. It is based on the book El secreto de las 7 semillas by David Fischman. It stars Carlos Alcántara. It premiered on October 20, 2016 in Peruvian theaters.

== Synopsis ==
Ignacio Rodríguez, a businessman, is admitted to the hospital due to a business and personal crisis. There he meets Lucho, his brother, who recommends him to visit a spiritual guide. Despite his disbelief, Ignacio decides to go see him and thus begins a journey of learning that leads him to find the inner peace he needed, and to revalue and recover the most valuable thing he has: his family.

== Cast ==
The actors participating in this film are:

- Carlos Alcántara as Ignacio Rodríguez
- Marco Zunino as Lucho
- Javier Cámara as Master
- Federico Luppi as Manuel
- Gianella Neyra as Miriam
- Ramón García as Castillo
- Jely Reategui as Carmen
- Katerina D'Onofrio as Cecilia
- Bernie Paz as Sergio
- Brando Gallesi as David

== Production ==
Principal photography began on April 11, 2016.

== Reception ==
Seven Seeds was seen by 28,445 viewers on its opening day in theaters. At the end of its first weekend it was seen by 253,463 viewers. It exceeded 530,000 viewers in its third weekend. In order of the year, the film attracted 611,256 viewers, becoming the fifth highest-grossing Peruvian film of 2016.
