= Brugué =

Brugué (Spanish pronunciation: [bɾuˈɣe]) is a Catalan surname. Notable people with the surname include:

- Monserrat Brugué (born 1967), Peruvian actress
- Roger Brugué (born 1996), Spanish footballer
