= La Liga del Sueño =

- Origin: Lima, Peru
- Genres: Pop punk, Rock en español
- Years active: 1991–2000, 2007–present
- Labels: Discos Independientes, Sony Latino
- Members: Jorge Madueño; Mauricio Chau; Alfonso Montesinos; Arturo Ríos
- Past members: Johanna San Miguel; Gonzalo Torres; Pilar Secada; Naty Barrios; José Javier Castro; Nacho Cisneros

La Liga del Sueño is a Peruvian pop punk band formed in Lima in 1991. The band is best known for the hits "La Peor de las Guerras" and "Mala Sangre".

== History ==
=== Formation and early years (1991–1997) ===
The band was formed in Lima by several members of the locally well-known clown troupe Pataclaun, including Pelo Madueño, Gonzalo Torres, and Johanna San Miguel. Early members José Javier Castro (visual artist), Naty Barrios (keyboards, sister of Mar de Copas' Manolo Barrios), Madueño, and Mauricio "Chino" Chau rotated between guitars, bass, keyboards, and lead vocals in each performance.

Their first public performance was on October 31, 1991, at the Centro Cultural Parra del Riego in Barranco, Lima, alongside established local musician Miki González. In their early shows the band used a cassette player in place of a live drummer, performing over pre-recorded rhythmic tracks while members exchanged instruments on stage.

In 1994 the band released their debut album Al derecho y al revés, which included the track "Aldina" and received brief rotation on MTV Latino. Two years later they released Por Tierra under the independent label Discos Independientes, which included the original version of "La Peor de las Guerras" and achieved local success, leading to the band's television appearances and growing radio airplay.

=== Mundo Cachina and international exposure (1998–2000) ===
The band was signed by Sony Music in 1998. Their third album Mundo Cachina, recorded at studios in Orlando, Florida, was released that year under Sony Latino. The fifteen-track album, composed largely by Madueño, includes "Mala Sangre", "La Peor de las Guerras", "No Es Amor", "Rodando", and "Semilla Negra". Sony granted the band full creative freedom throughout the recording process.

Mundo Cachina reached the top of Peruvian radio charts and received wide rotation through music videos for "Mala Sangre", "Semilla Negra", and "No Es Amor". The album is widely considered one of the most influential records in Peruvian rock, with tracks such as "Mala Sangre" and "No Es Amor" entering the collective memory of two generations of Peruvian listeners.

In 1999, the band was invited to Sony International's annual A&R Convention, where they performed alongside La Oreja de Van Gogh and Creed, among others. After extensive touring the band entered hiatus in 2000.

=== Reunion (2007–present) ===
In 2007, founding member "Pelo" Madueño announced the band's return. The band returned to stages at the Festival Vivo X El Rock in 2015 and, following that reunion, undertook a national tour and several major performances across Peru.

In 2023, to mark the 25th anniversary of Mundo Cachina, the original lineup — Madueño, Chau, Arturo Ríos, and Nacho Cisneros — reunited for a concert performing the album in full at the Centro de Convenciones Bianca in Barranco.

== Discography ==
- Al derecho y al revés (1994)
- Por Tierra (Discos Independientes, 1996)
- Mundo Cachina (Sony Latino, 1998)
