= Javier's Passion =

- Theatrical release poster
- Directed by: Eduardo Guillot
- Written by: Eduardo Guillot; Enrique Moncloa; Augusto Cabada
- Produced by: Eduardo Guillot; Gonzalo Galvao Teles; Luis Galvao Teles; Cielo Garrido
- Starring: Stefano Tosso; Lucho Cáceres; Sofía Rocha; Vania Accinelli
- Cinematography: César Fe
- Music by: Nuno Malo
- Production company: Huaca Rajada Cine SAC
- Distributed by: Imagia Films
- Release date: September 26, 2019
- Running time: 100 minutes
- Country: Peru
- Language: Spanish

Javier's Passion (Spanish: La pasión de Javier) is a 2019 Peruvian biographical drama film directed by Eduardo Guillot and written by Guillot, Enrique Moncloa & Augusto Cabada. The film tells the story of the poet Javier Heraud, his university life and his tragic death. It premiered on September 26, 2019, in Peruvian theaters.

== Plot ==
Peru, sixties. Javier Heraud, a passionate and non-conformist literature student, confronts his father who opposes his vocation as a poet. At the university, Javier meets Laura, whom he falls in love with, and a group of young poets and intellectuals with whom he will passionately devote himself to the world of poetry and politics. The conflict with his father worsens when Javier publishes his first collection of poems "El Río" and is invited to a youth meeting in the Soviet Union as a delegate of the left-wing political movement to which he belongs. Javier is dazzled by the Soviet Union and visits Paris, where he meets Mario Vargas Llosa and exchanges views on the Cuban Revolution, which is in full swing. With the conviction that the revolution is the only way to overcome inequalities in Latin America, fate takes him to Cuba to study film. Fascinated and identified with the achievements of the revolution, he decides to be consistent with his ideals, drop his studies and enroll, along with other Peruvians, in a guerrilla group in order to bring the revolution to Peru.

== Cast ==
- Stefano Tosso as Javier Heraud
- Lucho Cáceres as Jorge Heraud
- Sofía Rocha as Victoria Heraud
- Vania Accinelli as Laura
- Patricia Barreto as Cecilia Heraud
- Tommy Párraga as Héctor Béjar
- Sebastián Monteghirfo as Mario Vargas Llosa
- Fiorella Pennano as Laura's cousin
- Gabriel Gonzales as Degale
- Oscar Yepez as Alain
- Alejandro Guzmán as Mito

== Production ==
It was filmed in Lima, Paris and the jungle of Madre de Dios. It had the support of the Ibermedia fund of Spain, and the Ministry of Culture of Peru.

== Awards ==
- Winner PRIX DU PUBLIC 17 Festival Images Hispano – Américaines / Annecy – France 2022.
- Winner PRIX DU PUBLIC Festival Cinema Hispanique / Clemort Ferrand – France 2021.
- Winner GRAND PRIX Festival Cinema Peruvien de Paris, Le Soleil Tournant Best Film / Paris – France 2021
- Official Selection 13 Spanish Film Festival HISPANOMETRAJE / Belgrade – Serbia 2021
- Official Selection XVI Latin American Film Festival LAFF / Australia 2021
- FICG Official Selection Guadalajara International Film Festival / Guadalajara – Mexico 2020
- Official Selection CHICAGO LATINO FILM FESTIVAL / USA 2020
- Official Selection 42nd International Festival of New LATIN AMERICAN CINEMA HAVANA / Cuba 2020
