= Jimena Lindo =

Peruvian actress

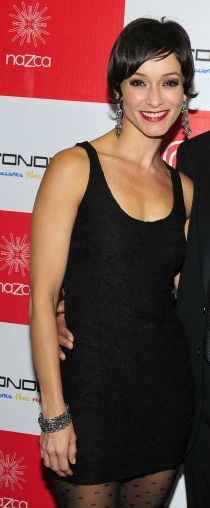
- Lindo in 2013.
- Born: Jimena Estefanía Lindo Biondi; December 9, 1976 (age 49); Lima, Peru
- Occupation: Actress
- Years active: 1996–present
- Children: 1

Jimena Estefanía Lindo Biondi (born 9 December 1976) is a Peruvian actress, dancer and TV presenter of Italian descent.

== Life and career ==
Daughter of Enrique Lindo and Ana María Biondi. She studied at the Peruvian-German School Alexander von Humboldt, where she showed an inclination for artistic activity since age five, participating in groups, courses and workshops in theater, ballet and contemporary dance. Graduated from college she studied Business Assistance.

Lindo started in acting training workshop of Roberto Angeles and the group Integro. She subsequently participated in a casting, which was called by the director Michael Gomez to attend the Peruvian series Tribus de la calle. At the end of it, she acted in two short films: Los milagros inútiles de Demerjac y El ascensor. She then starred in three telenovelas: Cosas del amor (1998), Travesuras del corazón (1998) and Isabella, mujer enamorada (1999). She also debuted as host in the cultural program Agenda CMC.

In 2000, she participated in her third short, Papapa Baltazar Caravedo, which won the award for Best Actress in Cade-Expecta (2001) in Lima. Shortly thereafter, she made her first starring role in the film El bien esquivo.

Lindo moved to Barcelona, Spain, where she lived for some years. In 2006, back to Peru, she starred Judith Vélez's debuts film La prueba, and was also present in several works of theater and television miniseries as Lobos de mar and Rita y yo. In 2007, she began a collaboration with artist Guillermo Castrillon, performing the dance-theater performances Escrito por una Gallina and Mujeres que habitan en mí.

In 2010, Lindo participated in the telenovela Los exitosos Gome$ and competed in the dance reality show El Gran Show.

In April 2011 she starred the play Las tres hermanas as Masha, premiered in April and directed by Francisco Lombardi. She also appeared in the telenovela Lalola.

In March 2012 debuts the play La cocina, starred by Lindo. Months later, she starred in the play Electra/Orestes.

In February 2013 she starred the play Proyección privada directed by Gilbert Rouvière. Her next play will be Casa de muñecas in the Teatro La Plaza.

== Filmography ==
=== Films ===
| Year | Title | Role | Notes |
|---|---|---|---|
| 1996 | Los milagros inútiles de Demerjac | | Short film |
| 1997 | El ascensor | | Short film |
| 1998 | Don't Tell Anyone | Drug-addict at disco | |
| 2000 | Papapa | Mili | Short film |
| 2001 | El bien esquivo | Hermana Inés Vargas de Carvajal | Main role |
| 2002 | Páramo | | |
| 2006 | The Trial | Miranda | |
| 2006 | Condominio | Leslie | |
| 2008 | Vidas paralelas | Bertha | Main role |
| 2013 | The Gospel of the Flesh | Julia / "Augusta" | Main role |
| 2014 | A los 40 | Cajera | Secondary role |
| 2016 | No estamos solos | Victoria | |
| 2016 | Locos de amor | Fernanda "Fer" Zavala / "Fernandita" | Main role |
| 2016 | Amor | Daniela | Short film |
| 2020 | The Best Families | "Lici" | |
| 2022 | ¿Quién dijo Detox? | Tati | |
| 2024 | Reinas | Elena | |

=== Television ===
| Year | Title | Role | Notes |
|---|---|---|---|
| 1996 | Tribus de la calle | | |
| 1998 | Cosas del amor | Laura | |
| 1998 | Apocalipsis | Karina | |
| 1998—1999 | Agenda CMC | Ella misma | Presenter |
| 1998—1999 | Travesuras del corazón | Flor Jiménez | |
| 1999 | Isabella, mujer enamorada | Alejandra Marina | |
| 2005 | Milagros | Sandra | |
| 2006 | Lobos de mar | Mariana | |
| 2007 | Rita y yo | Kiara | Main role |
| 2009 | Solteros casados | Brisa | |
| 2009 | Rita y yo y mi otra yo | Kiara | Main role |
| 2009—2012 | Mesa de noche | Herself | Presenter |
| 2010 | Los exitosos Gome$ | Alejandra "Alex" Álvarez | |
| 2010 | El Gran Show | Herself | Contestant, replaced |
| 2011 | Lalola | Victoria "Vicky" | |
| 2020 | Princesas | Fiorella Espinoza Troncoso | |
| 2025 | Eres mi sangre | Catalina Navarro Moncada de Rivera | |
| 2026 | Señora del destino | Mercedes López Talledo | |
