= Desconocido =

Desconocido (Spanish: "unknown" or "stranger") or Desconocida (feminine), or plurals, may refer to:

== Music ==
- Desconocida, 1998 album by Spanish singer Marta Sanchez

=== Songs ===
- "Desconocido" (1985), by Golpes Bajos
- "Desconocido", by Chambao, on the 2003 album Endorfinas en la Mente
- "Desconocidos", by Luis Villa, sung at the Spain in the OTI Festival 1998
- "Desconocidos" (2012), by Fantine (musician)
- "Desconocidos" (2018), by Manuel Turizo

== Other uses ==
- Desconocidas (Unknowns), a film directed by Venezuelan actor/director Luis Fernández
- El desconocido, Spanish title of the 2015 film Retribution by Dani de la Torre

== See also ==
- "Desconocido Soy", by David Byrne on his 2001 album Look into the Eyeball
