= The Strong Ones =

2019 Chilean film

- Chilean theatrical release poster
- Spanish: Los fuertes
- Directed by: Omar Zúñiga Hidalgo
- Written by: Omar Zúñiga Hidalgo
- Produced by: Omar Zúñiga Hidalgo; José Luis Rivas
- Starring: Samuel González; Antonio Altamirano
- Cinematography: Nicolás Ibieta
- Edited by: Carolina Marín
- Music by: Sokio
- Production companies: Cinestación; Terranova
- Release dates: 7 October 2019 (Valdivia); 12 March 2020 (Chile)
- Running time: 98 minutes
- Country: Chile
- Language: Spanish

The Strong Ones (Spanish: Los fuertes) is a 2019 Chilean film directed by Omar Zúñiga Hidalgo and starring Samuel González and Antonio Altamirano.

The movie is based on the original short film San Cristóbal, winner of the Teddy Award 2015 in the Berlin International Film Festival. González and Altamirano, the protagonists in the short film, reprised their roles in the full-length film.

The Strong Ones was released in 2019 as the opening film of the Valdivia International Film Festival. Then, it participated in several international festivals like OutFest and Mardi Gras Film Festival. It received theatrical release on 12 March 2020 in Chile; however, the COVID-19 pandemic suspended most cinemas a few days later. Finally, it was released for free in the Ondamedia streaming platform on 21 August 2020.

The movie was filmed in the city of Valdivia and neighboring Niebla, where an old Spanish fortress is used as background for the romance between the two protagonists. Los fuertes, the original name in Spanish, is a pun using the plural of fuerte, which can mean "strong" and "fortress".

== Plot ==
Lucas (played by Samuel González) travels to Niebla, a town in southern Chile, to visit his sister Carolina (played by Marcela Salinas) before leaving for Montreal, where he has received a scholarship for postgraduate studies. While in Niebla, Lucas befriends and falls in love with Antonio (played by Antonio Altamirano), a fisherman and part-time actor who reenacts the historical capture of Valdivia's fortresses.

== Cast ==
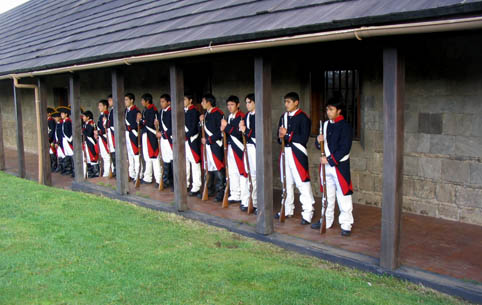
Actors representing Chilean soldiers in a historical reenactment in Niebla, as Antonio does in the film

- Samuel González - Lucas, an architect from Santiago that receives a scholarship in Montreal, Canada. Lucas and his conservative parents are estranged due to Lucas's homosexuality.
- Antonio Altamirano - Antonio Galindo, a young fisherman from Niebla. He also acts as a Chilean soldier in historical reenactments of the Capture of Valdivia for tourists visiting the town's fortress.
- Marcela Salinas - Catalina, Lucas' sister. She works as a dentist at the hospital in Niebla.
- Gabriela Fernández - Adriana, Antonio's grandmother and guardian after the death of his parents.
- Rafael Contreras - Martín, Catalina's partner.
- Nicolás Corales - Roca, Antonio's shipmate.
- Reynaldo Pacheco – Nimbles.

== See also ==
- LGBT rights in Chile
- List of LGBT-related films
