= Bleed. Scream. Beat! =

- Theatrical release poster
- Directed by: Aldo Miyashiro
- Written by: Aldo Miyashiro
- Produced by: Gilberto Nue
- Starring: Erika Villalobos; Kareen Spano; Manuel Calderón; Rómulo Assereto; Óscar Carrillo; Iván Chávez; Andrea Luna; Bruno Espejo; Fernando Castañeda; Katya Konychev.
- Cinematography: Cesar Fajardo
- Music by: Irene Vivanco
- Production company: Transversal Films
- Release dates: October 2017 (AFF); August 26, 2018 (Peru)
- Running time: 92 minutes
- Country: Peru
- Language: Spanish

Bleed. Scream. Beat! (Spanish: Sangra. Grita. Late!) is a 2017 Peruvian anthology crime drama thriller film directed by Aldo Miyashiro and written by Miyashiro, Erika Villalobos & Abril Cárdenas. It stars Erika Villalobos, Kareen Spano, Manuel Calderón, Rómulo Assereto, Óscar Carrillo, Iván Chávez, Andrea Luna, Bruno Espejo, Fernando Castañeda & Katya Konychev. The film won the Audience Award at the Houston Latino Film Festival.

== Synopsis ==
Ten actors star in three distinct stories, portraying a different character in each one of them; a man hurt by bullying, two women involved in an unexpected crime and the young woman who needs a heart to survive. This is his way of revealing us to a wild, chaotic and tender Lima at the same time. The game with photography and the change of atmosphere will be our main allies in this dizzying and thrilling journey.

== Cast ==
The actors participating in this film are:

- Erika Villalobos
- Kareen Spano
- Manuel Calderón
- Rómulo Assereto
- Óscar Carrillo
- Iván Chávez
- Andrea Luna
- Bruno Espejo
- Fernando Castañeda
- Katya Konychev

== Release ==
It premiered in October 2017 as part of the Official Competition in the Austin Film Festival. It premiered in Peruvian theaters on August 26, 2018
