= Lusers (film) =

- Theatrical release poster
- Directed by: Ticoy Rodríguez
- Written by: Fernando Castets
- Produced by: Carlos Alcántara Vilar
- Starring: Carlos Alcántara; Pablo Granados; Felipe Izquierdo
- Cinematography: Mauro Veloso
- Edited by: Danielle Fillios
- Music by: Angelo Pierattini
- Production companies: Tondero Films; Bamboosa
- Distributed by: New Century Films
- Release dates: 1 October 2015 (Peru & Chile)
- Running time: 96 minutes
- Countries: Peru; Chile; Argentina
- Language: Spanish

Lusers is a 2015 Chilean-Peruvian-Argentine adventure comedy film, starring the Peruvian Carlos Alcántara, the Chilean Felipe Izquierdo and the Argentine Pablo Granados. This film "revives" the classic joke of the Peruvian, the Chilean and the Argentine, respectively. It is produced by Tondero Films and Bamboosa, and directed by Ticoy Rodríguez, and was released on October 1, 2015 nationally and internationally. With this film, the distributors Tondero and Bamboosa will go abroad together for the first time.

== Synopsis ==
A Peruvian, a Chilean and an Argentinean live an eventful journey towards the World Cup in Brazil 2014 that leads them to endure hardships in the Amazonian jungle and eventually to become friends.

== Cast ==
- Carlos Alcántara as Edgar
- Felipe Izquierdo as Hannibal
- Pablo Granados as Rolo
- Gaby Espino as Black Widow
- Cristián de la Fuente as Pedro
- Claudia Portocarrero as Native
- Andrea Montenegro as Brazilian
- Carlos Carlín as Edgar's friend

== Soundtrack ==
- Another like you by Eros Ramazzotti
- Lusers (song)
- A friendship without borders by Pablo Granados
- Night Fever by Bee Gees (Spanish version)
- Life goes on the same by Sandro (in the end credits)

== Reception ==
On the day of its premiere, the film was seen by more than 40,000 spectators, surpassing The Martian, but it was not well received in Chile, only managing to attract 565 spectators on its first day. Lusers became the second most watched Peruvian film of 2015.
