= Back to School (2014 film) =

- Theatrical release poster
- Directed by: Bruno Ascenzo
- Written by: Bruno Ascenzo
- Produced by: Miguel Valladares; Carlos Alcántara Vilar
- Starring: Carlos Alcántara Vilar; Carlos Carlín; Katia Condos; Lali Espósito; Gianella Neyra; Wendy Ramos; Sofía Rocha; Stefano Salvini; Johanna San Miguel; Andrés Wiese
- Cinematography: Fergán Chávez-Ferrer
- Production company: Tondero Films
- Distributed by: New Century Films
- Release date: May 1, 2014
- Running time: 89 minutes
- Country: Peru
- Language: Spanish

Back to School (Spanish: A los 40, lit. 'At 40') is a 2014 Peruvian comedy film written and directed by Bruno Ascenzo. The fim stars Carlos Alcántara Vilar, Carlos Carlín, Katia Condos, Lali Espósito, Gianella Neyra, Wendy Ramos, Sofía Rocha, Stefano Salvini and Johanna San Miguel
Andrés Wiese

== Synopsis ==
Eight characters in their 40s face their past, present and future at a prom reunion party that leads them to question where their lives are headed.

== Production ==
The film was announced with a teaser on September 25, 2013. On November 12 of the same year, filming began in Lima. The comedians from Patacláun Carlos Alcántara, Carlos Carlín, Johanna San Miguel and Wendy Ramos were present.

== Cast ==
The actors participating in this film are:

- Carlos Alcántara as Luis Miguel Corrales.
- Carlos Carlín as Eddy Montalvo.
- Katia Condos as Francesca.
- Lali Esposito as Melissa.
- Gianella Neyra as Sofia.
- Andrés Wiese as Alejandro.
- Wendy Ramos as Lourdes Flores.
- Johanna San Miguel as Julia Dueñas.
- Sofía Rocha as Bárbara Martínez.
- Stefano Salvini as Mariano.
- Patricia Portocarrero as Anita Montalvo.
- Salvador del Solar as Esteban.

== Reception ==
=== Box-office ===
On May 1 it was released in Peru. Just 8 days after its premiere, the film exceeded 400 thousand viewers. In its entirety, it reached more than a million and a half viewers, generating a profit of 6 million, and obtaining the record of being the second highest-grossing film in the history of Peruvian cinema, as well as being the highest grosser in 2014.
