= Parece Amor =

Studio album by Mayra
- Released: 2013
- Genre: Pop
- Label: AMMG
- Producer: Manuel Garrido-Lecca; Jorge Sagobal Dellepiane

Singles from Parece Amor
- 1. "Horas"

Parece Amor is the first album of Peruvian actress and singer Mayra, released in 2013.

== Track listing ==
1. "Parece Amor"
2. "Pronto Regresará"
3. "Horas"
4. "Cállate"
5. "Ya No Habrá Un Después"
6. "Hasta El Fin De Los Mundos"
7. "La Última Vez"
8. "No Recuerdo"
