= Eres mi sangre =

- Genre: Telenovela
- Created by: Michelle Alexander
- Written by: Abel Enríquez; Juan Pablo Bustamante; Emmanuelle Kesch; Bryan Urrunaga
- Directed by: Josué Méndez; Francisco Álvarez
- Starring: Jimena Lindo; Reynaldo Pacheco; Sirena Ortiz
- Theme music composer: Juan Carlos Fernández
- Opening theme: "Eres mi sangre" by Eva Ayllón
- Country of origin: Peru
- Original language: Spanish
- No. of seasons: 1
- No. of episodes: 115

Production
- Executive producers: Hugo Coya; Adriana Álvarez; Michelle Alexander
- Camera setup: Multi-camera
- Production company: Del Barrio Producciones

Original release
- Network: América Televisión
- Release: 1 April – 9 September 2025

Eres mi sangre is a Peruvian telenovela created by Michelle Alexander. It aired on América Televisión from 1 April 2025 to 9 September 2025. The series stars Jimena Lindo, Reynaldo Pacheco and Sirena Ortiz.

== Plot ==
Catalina Navarro is an eighteen-year-old woman who gave birth to her son Salvador; he was the child of her relationship with Felipe Campos, a humble young man who worked for the police. However, her brother Bastian, a ruthless man due to his mother's contempt, separates Catalina from her newborn son and hands him over to Celso, his employee, who becomes Salvador's adoptive father at the insistence of his wife Rosario. Unable to have children of her own, Rosario decides to keep Salvador and raise him as her own, naming him Alonso Cruz.

More than thirty years have passed; Alonso now lives in Mexico, and his mother has come to visit him. Alonso has been promoted to financial analyst at Central Crédito Internacional, and his life seems perfect. Meanwhile, Catalina is celebrating her wedding anniversary with Leonardo Rivera, a murderer and mafia leader who appears to be a good person but is actually the complete opposite. Catalina married Leonardo at her family's insistence, even though she didn't love him, but rather Felipe. With Leonardo, Catalina has a daughter: Brigitte, a fashion influencer.

One night, Celso is chased by a mysterious person, who runs him over in the middle of the road. Celso is taken to the hospital, where he dies a few hours later. On the day of the accident, Alonso meets Gabriela, Bastian's daughter and Catalina's niece, with whom he begins a relationship that goes far beyond friendship. After Celso's death, Alonso blames the Navarro family for the death of his adoptive father and wants to take revenge for what happened. To continue investigating the Navarro family, Alonso proposes to Bastian that he work at the nationally renowned coffee company, Tierra Alta, which is owned by the Navarro family; but Bastian disagrees. Finally, Alonso gains Gabriela's support and manages to get a job at the company, hoping to uncover the whole truth, still unaware that there are more secrets than he expects.

== Cast ==
- Jimena Lindo as Catalina Navarro Moncada de Rivera
  - Merly Morello as young Catalina
- Reynaldo Pacheco as Alonso Cruz Rojas / Salvador Campos Navarro
  - Valentino Calderón as young Alonso
- Sirena Ortiz as Gabriela Navarro Mendoza / Gabriela Rivera Mendoza
- Rodrigo Sánchez Patiño as Bastian Navarro Moncada
  - Sergio Armasgo as young Bastian
  - Brandon Stieber as child Bastian
- Silvia Bardalez as Rosario Rojas de Cruz
  - Nathalia Vargas as young Rosario
- Gonzalo Molina as Leonardo Rivera
  - Diego Salinas as young Leonardo
- Brigitte Jouannet as Brigitte Rivera Navarro
- Marisa Minetti as Rocío Mendoza Gómez de Navarro
- Lilian Nieto as Helena Moncada de Navarro
  - Anneliese Fiedler as young Helena
- Miguel Álvarez as Mario Vivanco
- Andrea Mejía as Renata Juárez
- Rodrigo Chávez as Guillermo "Memo" Juárez
- Lelé Guillén as Lucía Navarro Ramos
- Jean Rivas as Óscar
- Javier Dulzaides as Pablo Pinedo Vásquez / Diego García
- José Luis Ruiz as Felipe Campos
  - Patrick D'Ambrosio as young Felipe
- Miguel Dávalos as Tobías "Toro" Ramírez
- Liliana Alegría as Silvia Ramos
  - Gretha Bazán as young Silvia

== Reception ==
The telenovela premiered on 1 April 2025, becoming the most watched program in its timeslot with a percentage of 15.5 points.
