= Pituca sin lucas (Peruvian TV series) =

Peruvian telenovela

- Genre: Telenovela
- Based on: Pituca sin lucas by Rodrigo Bastidas & Elena Muñoz
- Directed by: María Eugenia Rencoret; Gerardo Herrera
- Creative director: Guille Isa
- Starring: Jorge Aravena; Emilia Drago; Priscila Espinoza; Francisca Aronsson; Narelle Casabone; Jano Baca; Diego Villarán; Brandon Stieber; Kukuli Morante; Gustavo Mayer
- Opening theme: "Cuando nos volvamos a encontrar" by Carlos Vives & Marc Anthony
- Composers: José Lindley; Jesús Lévano
- Country of origin: Peru
- Original language: Spanish
- No. of seasons: 1
- No. of episodes: 151

Production
- Executive producer: María Eugenia Rencoret
- Producer: Bruno Córdova
- Editor: Nelson Valdés
- Camera setup: Multi-camera
- Production companies: Chasqui Producciones; Mega

Original release
- Network: Latina Televisión
- Release: 6 May – 2 December 2024

Papá en apuros is a Peruvian telenovela based on the 2014 Chilean telenovela of the same name, created by Rodrigo Bastidas y Elena Muñoz. It aired on Latina Televisión from 6 May 2024 to 2 December 2024. The series stars Jorge Aravena, Emilia Drago, Gustavo Mayer, Kukuli Morante and Fernanda Llanos.

== Premise ==
Techi de la Puente is a wealthy, married woman with three daughters. The great dilemma of her life begins when her husband experiences financial difficulties and flees the country, leaving her without any financial support. She is forced to start over, moving with her entire family to a middle-class district. In her new home, her neighbor is Manuel Gallardo, a widower with four children who works at the fish market. Although Techi and Manuel initially clash due to their different personalities, an unexpected and irresistible attraction begins to develop between them.

== Cast ==
=== Main ===
- Jorge Aravena as Manuel "El Tiburón" Gallardo
- Emilia Drago as María Teresa "Techi" de la Puente Lorenzzi de Rizo-Patrón
- Kukuli Morante as María Consuelo "Conchita" Méndez
- Gustavo Mayer as José Antonio Rizo-Patrón
- Martha Figueroa as Socorro "La Cocó" Lorenzzi
- Roberto Moll as Bernardo Iglesias
- Priscila Espinoza as María Gracia Rizo-Patrón de la Puente
- Jano Baca as Salvador Gallardo
- Paulina Bazán as Micaela Gallardo
- Sergio Gjurinovic as Felipe "Pipo" Arosemena
- Francisca Aronsson as María Belén Rizo-Patrón de la Puente
- Diego Villarán as Franco Gallardo
- Fernanda Llanos as Margarita Prieto Iglesias
- Henry "Chapasa" Peláez as Gregorio "Goyo" Choque
- Tito Vega as Enrique "Enrí" Andrade
- Narelle Casabonne as María Piedad "Piqui" Rizo-Patrón de la Puente
- Brandon Stieber as Alonso Gallardo

=== Recurring and guest stars ===
- Luis Hans Ortega as Miguel "Miguelito"
- Tati Alcántara as Loretta Diez Canseco
- Alfonso Dibós as Rafael
- Pía Ladrón de Guevara as Candela
- Jorge Moretti as Padre Gutiérrez
- Franco Silva as Benjamín
- Renzo Quintanilla as Patricio "Pato"
- Micky Moreno as Lorenzo
- Maritere Braschi as herself
- Wendy Wunder as herself
- Pau Misha as Alejandra
- Matías Gallo as Esteban
- Norka Ramírez as Sandra
- Nicolás Fantinato as Don Pastor
- Nydia Barandiarán as Génesis

== Reception ==
The telenovela premiered on 6 May 2024, positioning itself in fifth place in the audience during primetime with a percentage of 10.6 points, being surpassed by its competitor, the telenovela Al fondo hay sitio airing on América Televisión. The Kantar Ibope Media survey placed it in fourth place in its time slot on its premiere date, reaching that position with an amount of 733,000 viewers.
