= Grandes Éxitos: Los Mejores Años de Nuestra Vida =

Los Mejores Años de Nuestra Vida

Greatest hits album by Marta Sanchez
- Released: 2001
- Genre: Latin pop
- Label: Polygram

Marta Sanchez chronology
Desconocida (1998)	Los Mejores Años de Nuestra Vida (2001)	Soy Yo (2002)

Los Mejores Anos de Nuestra Vida: Greatest Hits is the first compilation of Spanish singer Marta Sanchez. This was released in United States on June 5, 2001. The first CD includes the singles on the original version and the second CD is a remix collection mostly from her previous album Desconocida. It sold 500,000 copies worldwide.

== Track listing ==
CD 1

1. Quiero Más de Ti – 3:26
2. Desesperada – 3:46
3. Arena y Sol – 3:15
4. De Mujer a Mujer – 4:52
5. Desconocida – 4:38
6. Negro Azabache (If I Ever Loose This Heaven) – 5:13
7. Los Mejores Años de Nuestra Vida (I Migliori Anni Della Nostra Vita) – 4:25
8. Vivo Por Ella (Vivo Per Lei) (Duet with Andrea Bocelli) – 4:26
9. La Belleza – 3:30
10. Moja Mi Corazón – 4:55
11. Lejos de Aquella Noche – 3:31
12. Dime la Verdad – 4:10
13. Amen – 3:50
14. Tal Vez – 3:47
15. Enamorada Sin Querer – 3:57
16. Y Sin Embargo Te Quiero – 4:32

CD 2

1. Desconocida [Bombay Mix] – 4:52
2. Desconocida [Fun Mix Radio Edit by Jean] – 3:44
3. Desconocida [Fun Mix Extended Mix by Jean] – 5:13
4. Desconocida [Lazy Mix Radio Edit by Jean] – 3:39
5. Desconocida [Latin Mix] – 3:54
6. Perfect Stranger – 4:31
7. Desperate Lovers [Extended] – 5:22
8. Desesperada [Extended] – 5:18
9. Where the Love Never Ends – 4:52
10. Quiero Más de Ti [LB Classic Mix] – 5:50
11. Quiero Más de Ti [Noryb Siul Big Ben Dub] – 4:27
12. Quiero Más de Ti [Sweet Briz Extended] – 8:32
13. Quiero Más de Ti [Sweet Briz Radio Edit] – 3:53
