= Perdóname (TV series) =

- Genre: Telenovela
- Created by: Michelle Alexander
- Written by: Aldo Miyashiro; Abel Enríquez; Érika Villalobos; Alejandro Alva; Abril Cárdenas; Gilberto Nué
- Directed by: Aldo Salvini; Julián Alexander; Sandro Méndez
- Creative director: Micaela Varese Zimic
- Starring: Érika Villalobos; Aldo Miyashiro
- Theme music composer: Estéfano
- Opening theme: "Yo Te Amo" by Chayanne
- Composer: Juan Carlos Fernández
- Country of origin: Peru
- Original language: Spanish
- No. of seasons: 1
- No. of episodes: 51

Production
- Executive producer: Ivanna de la Piedra
- Producers: Hugo Coya; Adriana Álvarez; Michelle Alexander
- Camera setup: Multi-camera
- Production company: Del Barrio Producciones

Original release
- Network: América Televisión
- Release: 27 September – 8 December 2023

Pérdoname is a Peruvian telenovela created by Érika Villalobos and Aldo Miyashiro. It stars Villalobos and Miyashiro and the plot is based on an incident of infidelity between them. The telenovela aired on América Televisión from 27 September 2023 to 8 December 2023.

== Premise ==
The telenovela follows Lara Ferradas, who learns through the media that her ex-partner, Lito Acosta, will be released after serving 15 years in prison for the mysterious murder of her brother, Pablo Ferradas. This news takes her completely by surprise, and Lara faces a difficult decision: forgive Lito or continue her life without him.

== Cast ==
- Érika Villalobos as Lara Ferradas Ferradas
- Aldo Miyashiro as Aquiles "Lito" Acosta Acosta
- Lourdes Berninzon as Victoria Ferradas
- Javier Valdés as Eduardo Ferradas
- Fernando Niño as Enzo Messina
- Gabriela Velázquez as Rosa Acosta "Mamá Rosa"
- Alexandra Graña as Cristina
- Emilram Cossío as Samuel Acosta Acosta
- Gilberto Nué as "Tuerquita" Acosta Acosta
- Pedro Sánchez as "Sugar" Acosta Acosta
- Sebastián Monteghirfo as Blass Monteverde
- Stephany Orúe as Margarita Rosales
- Ximena Arroyo as Dr. Flores
- Andrés Salas as Adrián Jiménez / Fabián Garza
- Santiago Suárez as Antonio "Toño" Rosales
- Raysa Ortiz as Leslie Bustamante
- Manuel Baca Solsol as Juan Vázquez "Fierro"
- Mikael Miyashiro as Joaquín Alberto Acosta Ferradas / Joaquín Alberto Messina Ferradas
- Vania Torres as Ivana
- Fernanda Miyashiro as Renata Acosta Ferradas / Renata Messina Ferradas
- Rafael Ferrero as Valentín Acosta Acosta
- Roberto Moll as Alberto Ferradas

== Reception ==
The telenovela premiered on 27 September 2025 with a percentage rating of 23.5 points, becoming the most watched program in primetime. The telenovela received a moderate reception from the audience, with mixed reviews regarding the acting performances of the lead actors.
