= Hablando huevadas: ¡Hijo de...! =

- Theatrical release poster
- Directed by: Eduardo Pinto
- Written by: Gerardo Morales
- Produced by: Jorge Luna; Ricardo Mendoza; Izan Alcázar
- Cinematography: Daniel Higashionna
- Release date: December 21, 2023
- Running time: 60 minutes
- Country: Peru
- Language: Spanish
- Budget: S/500.000

Hablando huevadas: ¡Hijo de...! (lit. 'Talking nonsense: Son of a...!') is a 2023 Peruvian comedy film directed by Eduardo Pinto (in his directorial debut) and written by Gerardo Morales. It is based on the videocast and theatrical show by Jorge Luna and Ricardo Mendoza, who star in the film along with Izan Alcázar. It premiered on December 21, 2023, exclusively in Cineplanet theaters.

== Synopsis ==
Ricardo and Jorge, two prominent comedians in Peru, are being legally prosecuted by the government. In this complicated scenario, a child appears claiming to be Ricardo's son, which adds an additional dimension to the trial and redefines the life of a father for him, with Jorge's support.

== Cast ==
- Jorge Luna as Himself
- Ricardo Mendoza as Himself
- Izan Alcázar as Gabriel Mendoza
- Emilram Cossío as Lawyer Julio
- Tabata Fernández as Melissa
- Kailani Pinedo as Shakira Luna
- Amil Mikati as Ronaldinho Luna
- Paco Caparó as Judge Renato Ruedas
- Mayra Goñi
- Alonso Acuña
- Gerardo Morales
- Sebastián Abad
- Joseph Argumedo
- Gino Bonatti
- Gino Pesaressi
- Gonzalo «Goncho» Iglesias
- Pablo Saldarriaga
- Alonso Cano
- Cheli Vera
- Abigail Fernández Santillán
- Santiago Valencoso
- Victoria Cornejo Echevarría
- Sergio Peña
