= Tu nombre y el mío =

- Genre: Telenovela
- Created by: Michelle Alexander
- Written by: Abel Enríquez; Juan Pablo Bustamante; Malena Newton; Martín Velásquez
- Directed by: Sandro Méndez; Julián Alexander; Aldo Salvini
- Creative director: Francisco Álvarez
- Starring: Mario Cortijo; Alessandra Fuller; Daniela Feijoó; Sirena Ortiz; Reynaldo Pacheco; Carolina Infante; Óscar Carrillo; Emilram Cossío; Sergio Armasgo; Bernardo Scerpella
- Theme music composer: Juan Carlos Fernández
- Opening theme: "Tu nombre y el mío" by Deyvis Orosco
- Country of origin: Peru
- Original language: Spanish
- No. of seasons: 1
- No. of episodes: 84

Production
- Executive producer: Ivanna de la Piedra
- Producers: Hugo Coya; Adriana Álvarez; Michelle Alexander
- Cinematography: Warren Lévano
- Camera setup: Multi-camera
- Production company: Del Barrio Producciones

Original release
- Network: América Televisión
- Release: 7 August – 2 December 2024

Tu nombre y el mío is a Peruvian biographical telenovela created by Michelle Alexander. It tells the story of singer and actor Deyvis Orosco, portrayed by Mario Cortijo. The telenovela aired on América Televisión from 7 August 2024 to 2 December 2024.

== Plot ==
Deyvis is a music enthusiast who dreams of shining on stage and carrying on his father Johnny's legacy. However, Johnny tries to protect him and give him a realistic perspective on his own artistic path. Over the years, Deyvis joins Grupo Néctar, the band his father founded with Pancho, where he performs as a musician; later, he joins Orquesta La Miel to test his talent on his own without Johnny's help. But it wasn’t until 2007 that Deyvis received the news of his father's death in a car accident in Argentina while he was on tour with the group. As a result, he took on the mission of leading Grupo Néctar, finding the strength to persevere and eventually becoming the "Sweetheart of Cumbia" (Bomboncito de la Cumbia).

== Cast ==
- Mario Cortijo as Deyvis Juniors Orosco Atanacio
  - Dominic Oré as child Deyvis
- Reynaldo Pacheco as Jorge Carlos "Johnny" Orosco Torres
- Carolina Infante as Eva Atanacio
- Daniela Feijoó as Hellen
  - Macarena Bachmann as child Hellen
- Alessandra Fuller as Cassandra Sánchez de Lamadrid Newton
- Sirena Ortiz as Adriana Rodríguez / Martínez
- Joel Calderón as Gustavo "Tavo" Méndez Cruz
  - Jean Christopher Rivas as child Gustavo
- Iván Chávez as Enrique "Kike" Orosco Torres
- Edward Llungo as Francisco "Pancho" Hurtado
- Sergio Armasgo as Francisco "Pancho Jr." Hurtado Chávez
- Óscar Carrillo as Marcial Montero
- Emilram Cossío as Jorge Darío "Koky / El Chacal" Ayala
- Jorge "Coco" Gutiérrez as David Huamán "El Cobra"
- Facundo Posincovich as Facundo López
- Bernardo Scerpella as Javier Rengifo
- Pold Gastello as Felipe Atanacio
- Úrsula Mármol as Doña Teodolina de Atanacio
- Ximena Díaz as Katty Morales
- Brigitte Jouannet as Carla Deyanira Jiménez Alzamora
- Daniel Cano as Willy del Rosario
- Lucía Oxenford as Fiorella Trigoso
- Javier Dulzaides as Matías Montero
- Merly Morello as Natalia "Naty" Montero / Ayala
- Stephany Orúe as Estrella Campos
- Ethel Pozo as Perla

== Reception ==
The telenovela premiered on 7 August 2024, positioning itself in second place in the audience during primetime with a percentage rating of 19.5 points, being surpassed by Al fondo hay sitio, also airing on América Televisión.
