= Ciudad Naufragio =

Studio album by Pelo Madueño
- Released: July 2004
- Recorded: 2003–2004
- Genre: Rock, pop rock
- Length: 45:00
- Label: Factoría Autor / Circus Music Management
- Producer: Pedro Rodríguez, Pelo Madueño

Pelo Madueño chronology
Ciudad Naufragio (2004)	No te salves (2008)

Ciudad Naufragio is the debut solo studio album by Peruvian musician Pelo Madueño, released in July 2004 through Factoría Autor and Circus Music Management. The album blends rock and pop rock styles, showcasing Madueño’s transition from his earlier band projects to a solo career.

== Background ==
After gaining recognition as a member of bands such as Narcosis and La Liga del Sueño, Madueño began working on solo material in the early 2000s. Ciudad Naufragio reflects his interest in combining introspective lyrics with melodic arrangements, while also featuring collaborations with notable artists such as Spanish singer-songwriter Joaquín Sabina.

== Reception ==
The album received moderate acclaim in Peru and Spain, with critics highlighting Madueño’s lyrical experimentation and the collaboration with Joaquín Sabina as a standout moment. Ciudad Naufragio established him as a distinctive voice in Latin American rock, paving the way for his later works.

== Track listing ==
1. "Naufragio City" – 0:53
2. "Alma de 80's" – 4:05
3. "¿Quién demonios ha escondido el color?" – 3:04
4. "Nuestro secreto" (featuring Joaquín Sabina) – 3:55
5. "Al final del camino" – 4:51
6. "Christine" – 3:20
7. "Out the Dope" – 0:59
8. "Aleluya" – 3:31
9. "Deberías morir" – 1:58
10. "A todo o nada" – 2:08
11. "Baby" – 4:34
12. "De regreso a casa" – 5:14
13. "Mujer maldita" – 5:44
14. "Mentiras" (written by Daniela Romo) – 2:10

== Personnel ==
- Pelo Madueño – vocals, production
- Pedro Rodríguez – production
- Joaquín Sabina – guest vocals on "Nuestro secreto"
- Additional session musicians – guitars, bass, drums
