= Cu4tro (film) =

- Theatrical release poster
- Directed by: Frank Pérez-Garland; Sergio Barrio; Christian Buckley; Bruno Ascenzo
- Written by: Christian Buckley; Frank Pérez-Garland
- Produced by: Christian Buckley; Frank Pérez-Garland; Miguel Valladares
- Cinematography: Mario Bassino
- Edited by: Roberto Barba
- Music by: Mar de Copas
- Production company: Nawi Producciones S.A.C
- Release date: October 15, 2009
- Running time: 85 minutes
- Country: Peru
- Language: Spanish

Cu4tro is a 2009 Peruvian anthology drama film directed by Frank Pérez-Garland, Sergio Barrio, Christian Buckley & Bruno Ascenzo. Based on a script written by Christian Buckley and Frank Pérez-Garland. The film presents 4 episodes where the protagonists go through the harsh experience of surviving in the absence of their loved one. It premiered on October 15, 2009, in Peruvian theaters.

== Synopsis ==
=== 1st episode ===
Cecilia, a young woman, returns to her apartment at night, finding herself exhausted, fighting against her own space, the worn-out everyday life and the overwhelming silence. In the end, she must face her deepest fears.

=== 2nd episode ===
Alex and Chiara, two brothers who must go shopping and organize the burial of their recently deceased father. In the store they meet the Seller with whom they will engage in a fun dispute to define the modality of the burial, where feelings from the most absurd to the deepest will surface.

=== 3rd episode ===
Víctor arrives at the house of Pedro, his childhood friend, who lives with his daughter after losing his wife. Gabriela, affected by the death of her mother, finds in Víctor someone she can trust, generating a close but bizarre bond.

=== 4th episode ===
Peter has to witness the last moments of the life of Raúl, a man who suffers from multiple sclerosis. The development of the plot will reveal how it affects him, since after several years of living as a couple, Peter finds himself in a relationship with an expiration date.

== Cast ==
The actors participating in this film are:

- Vanessa Saba as Cecilia
- Bruno Ascenzo as Alex
- Katia Condos as Salewoman
- Natalia Parodi as Chiara
- Miguel Iza as Víctor
- Gonzalo Torres as Pedro
- Gisela Ponce de León as Gabriela
- Renzo Schuller as Peter
- Paul Vega as Raúl
- Oscar López Arias as Tony

== Financing ==
Cu4tro was the winner of the Extraordinary Competition for Feature Film Projects, Conacine 2008, where they received S/. 450,000 to start filming.
