= Operación Triunfo (Peruvian TV series) =

TV Series

Operación Triunfo was the Peruvian version of the Spanish TV series of the same name and based on the international franchise Star Academy.

The inaugural and so far the only season in Peru was broadcast in 2012, on the Peruvian TV network América Televisión. The series was hosted by Gisela Valcárcel and the winner the show was then 19 year-old Mayra Goñi. As of January 2020, there is no announcement regarding a reboot.

== Contestants ==
Name	Hometown	State
Mayra Goñi	Lima	Winner
Ariadna Ponte	Arequipa	2nd Place
Lucas Torres	Trujillo	3rd Place
Cielo Torres	Tacna	4th Place
Marcela Navarro	Iquitos	5th Place
Marcos Golergant	Lima	Eliminated; August 11, 2012
Diego Delgado	Lima	Eliminated; August 11, 2012
Karolina Cruz	Iquitos	Eliminated; August 4, 2012
Christian Moreno	Chimbote	Eliminated; July 28, 2012
Ana Olórtegui	Lima	Eliminated; July 21, 2012
Carlos Bellido	Puno	Eliminated; July 14, 2012
Eva Solís	Lima	Eliminated; July 14, 2012
Mario Silva	Arequipa	Eliminated; July 7, 2012
Andreé Luján	Lima	Eliminated; June 30, 2012
Miguel Ángel Pérez	Lima	Eliminated; June 23, 2012
Evelyn Barturén	Chiclayo	Eliminated; June 16, 2012
Piero Campaña	Lima	Eliminated; June 9, 2012
Ciela Prado	Lima	Eliminated; June 2, 2012
