= Reynaldo Pacheco =

Bolivian actor (born 1987)

- Born: Reynaldo Andrés Pacheco Muguertegui; 24 July 1987 (age 38); La Paz, Bolivia
- Occupation: Actor
- Years active: 2000—present

Reynaldo Andrés Pacheco Muguertegui (born 24 July 1987) is a Bolivian actor and composer, known for portraying various Hollywood characters.

== Early life ==
Pacheco was born and raised in La Paz, Bolivia. At the age of 13, he joined a theater group at La Salle school and then went abroad as an exchange student, residing in Brilliant, Ohio. At 17, Pacheco produced his own play and joined the musical theater group at the Jefferson County Christian School. Upon returning to Bolivia, he enrolled in the Bolivian Catholic University San Pablo to study business administration and joined another theater group. He was also a member of La Rodilla del Telón, a traveling group of street artists of La Paz, and later became a prominent performer of La Paz Philharmonic.

Pacheco decided to abandon his business studies and to continue his career as an actor. He left Bolivia and began his education at Wabash College in Indiana, where he graduated with a bachelor's degree in French and in theater and political sciences. While studying at Wabash, Pacheco moved to France to study film, acting, and photography at Paris Nanterre University and the Sorbonne University. He later deepened his studies in theater history and writing on a month-long trip to London and Ecuador. Pacheco also lived in Chiapas and Oaxaca, in Mexico, where he worked as teacher.

In 2006, he was one of ten students accepted into an advanced arts program at the University of Southern California, where he graduated in 2009. Beginning in that same year, he began working as an actor in Los Angeles.

== Career ==
Pacheco first joined the cast of a comedy film, where he worked alongside Puerto Rican singer Ozuna. He then had a brief stint at his native Bolivia's cinema, working in leading roles, including in the biopic of Bolivian singer-songwriter Nilo Soruco.

In 2015, he played another role at a Hollywood production, joining the cast of Our Brand Is Crisis. The film made its world premiere at the Toronto International Film Festival on 11 September 2015, and was released nationwide in the United States on 30 October of the same year. For his role in the film, Pacheco received an Imagen Awards nomination for Best Supporting Actor in a Motion Picture.

Pacheco has also taken acting credits as a guest starring role in CSI: NY and another role in Without Men, where he starred alongside Eva Longoria and Kate del Castillo. He also had supporting roles in The Man Who Shook the Hand of Vicente Fernandez and in Beginners.

Reynaldo founded the Hollywood Academy of Performing Arts (HAPA), an international acting and screenwriting academy based in different cities in both, his native Bolivia and the United States, and later founded a social activism group, where he shares inspiring stories of struggling families from undeveloped countries.

== Personal life ==
In October 2015, Pacheco spoke about his connections with Bolivia during an interview about the movie Our Brand Is Crisis, which deals with the events of the 2002 Bolivian general election. Pacheco said that he had to improve his Spanish accent to interpret his character because it involved Spanish mixed with Quechua and Aymara. When questioned about then-President Evo Morales, he said that Bolivia was "going through a peak of economic growth", praising the government approach in promoting national pride for its diverse races, cultures, and social groups.

In the same interview, Pacheco said that he was never judged for leaving Bolivia, adding that people in Bolivia see him as someone who "realized a crazy dream" without abandoning (his) roots, with Pacheco highlighting that he never pretended to be someone else to fit in. Pacheco recalled that Scottish actor Ewan McGregor told him "not to erase (my) accent" because it represents your culture and where (I) come from.

== Filmography ==
Year	Title	Role	Notes	Ref.
2010	Beginners	Julio (Note: The character is called "Juan" in the film, but named "Julio" in the film's credits.)		
2011	Without Men	Julio		
2012	The Man Who Shook the Hand of Vicente Fernandez	Miguel	Western film	
2015	Our Brand Is Crisis	Eddie		
2019	The Strong Ones	Nimbles	Chilean production	
2019	Los Leones	Enrique	Frank Perozo production	
2024	Tu nombre y el mío	Jorge Carlos "Johnny" Orosco Torres	Television series	
2025	Eres mi sangre	Alonso Cruz Rojas / Salvador Campos Navarro	Television series	

== Nominations ==
Year	Award	Category	Nominated work	Result	Ref.
2016	Imagen Awards	Best Supporting Actor in a Motion Picture	Our Brand Is Crisis	Nominated	
