= Señora del destino =

2026 Peruvian telenovela

- Genre: Telenovela
- Based on: Senhora do Destino by Aguinaldo Silva
- Developed by: Abel Enríquez
- Written by: Emanuel Kesch; Martín Velásquez
- Directed by: Francisco Álvarez
- Creative director: Guillermo Palacios
- Starring: Jimena Lindo; Magdyel Ugaz
- Theme music composer: Juan Carlos Fernández
- Opening theme: "Estás ahí" by Marisol y La Magia Del Norte
- Country of origin: Peru
- Original language: Spanish
- No. of seasons: 1
- No. of episodes: 108

Production
- Executive producer: Ivanna de la Piedra
- Producers: Hugo Coya; Adriana Álvarez; Michelle Alexander
- Cinematography: Miguel Valencia; Warren Lévano
- Camera setup: Multi-camera
- Production company: Del Barrio Producciones

Original release
- Network: América Televisión
- Release: 8 April – 8 September 2026

Señora del destino is a 2026 Peruvian telenovela based on the 2004 Brazilian telenovela Senhora do Destino, created by Aguinaldo Silva. It aired on América Televisión from 8 April 2026 to 8 September 2026. The series stars Jimena Lindo and Magdyel Ugaz.

== Premise ==
Mercedes López leaves her hometown with her five children to seek new opportunities in Lima. Mercedes' life takes an unexpected turn when Lourdes kidnaps her youngest daughter, prompting her to start a search that stretches over years.

== Cast ==
- Jimena Lindo as Mercedes López Talledo
  - Brigitte Jouannet as young Mercedes
- Magdyel Ugaz as Belén
  - Daniela Feijoó as young Belén / Lourdes
- Sebastián Monteghirfo as David
  - José Miguel Argüelles as young David
- Óscar López Arias as Giovanni Carranza
- Jesús Neyra as Reynaldo Pérez López
  - Ian Tijero as child Reynaldo
- Ítalo Maldonado as Leandro Pérez López
  - Claudio Rubio as child Leandro
- Diego Villarán as Patricio Pérez López
  - Santiago Daniel as child Patricio
- Filippo Storino as Víctor Pérez López
  - Alessandro Greco as child Víctor
- Gilberto Nué as Sebastián López
  - Miguel Seminario as young Sebastián
- Iván Chávez as Aldo
  - Luis Baca as young Aldo
- Stefano Salvini as Eduardo
- Lelé Guillén as Natalia
- Valeria Ríos as Isabel
- Jano Baca as Marcelo López
- Valeria Conroy as Viviana
- Gia Rosalino as Claudia
- Daniela Olaya as Emilia
- Nathalia Vargas as Rebeca
- Rodrigo López Silva as Kevin "Pantera"
- Giovanni Arce as Tomás
- Miguel Álvarez as Javier
- Carlos Carlín as José Carlos
  - Sebastián Rubio as young José Carlos

== Reception ==
The telenovela premiered on 8 April 2026, becoming the most watched program in its timeslot with a percentage of 17 points.
