= Roberto Moll =

Peruvian actor

Roberto Moll Cárdenas (born 19 July 1948) is an actor who is best known for his work on telenovelas. He was born in Lima, Peru. Moll first starred with little roles in many telenovelas, but in 1985 he got a bigger role in the telenovela Cristal. Later he starred in other telenovelas like Abigail, Carmín, Kassandra, El Desafío and Reina de Corazones.

== Later career ==
In 2003 Moll starred with Astrid Carolina Herrera in telenovela La Mujer de Judas and in 2005 with Mario Cimarro in El Cuerpo del Deseo.

In 2010 he starred with Mauricio Ochmann and Sandra Echeverria in El Clon, where he portrays Augusto Albieri, a genetic specialist that created a clone of the hero.

He was portrayed Venezuelan President Cipriano Castro in the 2017 film La planta insolente.

== Personal life ==
In 1984 he married the Venezuelan actress Carmen Padrón, and they had one child, a daughter, before divorcing in 2000.

Moll suffered from a pneumonia in 2013. He stayed two weeks in a coma and was declared clinically dead, before recovering conscience.

== Selected filmography ==
- Perdóname (2023) as Alberto Ferradas
- Pituca sin lucas (2024) as Bernardo Iglesias
- Eres mi bien (2025-26) as Vicente Braulio Pacheco Bravo
- Valentina valiente (2026) as Edmundo Echegaray Salinas
