= ¡Asu mare! 2 =

- Theatrical release poster
- Directed by: Ricardo Maldonado
- Written by: Rasec Barragán; Roberto Simer; Alberto Rojas Apel
- Produced by: Miguel Valladares
- Starring: Carlos Alcántara Vilar; Emilia Drago
- Cinematography: Abel Irribaren
- Edited by: Eric Williams
- Music by: José San Miguel; Carlos San Miguel
- Production company: Tondero Films
- Distributed by: Tondero Films
- Release date: 9 April 2015
- Running time: 100 minutes
- Country: Peru
- Language: Spanish

¡Asu mare! 2 is a 2015 Peruvian semi-biographical comedy film. Sequel to the successful Peruvian film ¡Asu Mare! starring Carlos Alcántara. The film held the record for the most watched Peruvian film in Peru until it was dethroned by Avengers: Infinity War in 2018.

== Plot ==
The film is focused on Lima in the mid 90's. In this medley of the monologue by Carlos Alcántara, the plot adds real experiences to fictitious situations.

Cachín is an actor who works steadily in the series ''Patacláun''. With the luxuries, he has enough to live on and does what he likes. The labor issue already seems to be resolved. He is happy with his life, but something is missing: the love of his life, Emilia (Emilia Drago). After meeting her at a party, Cachín almost manages to win her over. However, Emilia's main boyfriend is Ricky (Christian Meier), a wealthy, handsome man, loved by the family. Cachín must face many difficult situations where social differences predominate, to be accepted by Emilia's family and friends. Because of this, he decides to change his identity to hide many aspects of his life and to hide his friends from Peepers.

== Cast ==
- Carlos Alcántara as Like himself (Cachín, "Machín").
- Emilia Drago as Emilia Rizo-Patron.
- Christian Meier as Ricky
- Ana Cecilia Natteri as Doña Chabela.
- Andrés Salas as Jaime Culicich "El Culi"
- Anahí de Cardenas as Pamela (Emilia's friend)
- Rodrigo Sánchez Patiño as Kurt
- Gonzalo Torres as English teacher
- Denisse Dibós as Elena Rizo-Patrón (Mother of Emilia)
- Javier Delgiudice as Ricardo Rizo-Patrón (Father of Emilia)
- Katia Condos as Emilia's aunt
- Franco Cabrera as "Lechuga" (Cachín's friend).
- Miguel Vergara as "El Chato" (Cachín's friend).
- Ricardo Mendoza as "Tarrón" (Cachín's friend).
- Daniel Marquina as Soldier, "police"
- Pietro Sibille as Taxi driver
- Patricia Portocarrero as Florencia (employee of the Rizo-Patrón)
- Yuca as Cameo during the movie
- Faridhe Alocantara as Niece of Carlos Peludo Cachin.

=== Cameos ===
- Carlos Carlín as himself, "Tony"
- Johanna San Miguel as herself, "Queca"
- Jerry Rivera as himself
- Julián Legaspi as Caligula

== Reception ==
- Asu Mare 2 has been the most watched film in Peru.
- Asu Mare 2 is the first film in history to sell over 100,000 admissions daily for 11 consecutive days. The record was held by ¡Asu Mare! (2013).

On Monday, 18 May, the film managed to surpass its prequel by a thousand viewers, becoming the most watched film in Peruvian cinema. The figure reached is 3,038,775 viewers, surpassing its prequel that had achieved 3,037,270 attendees. It has been mentioned that the film will continue in theaters until the end of May.

With this, the first two most viewed films in the history of Peruvian cinema are ¡Asu Mare! 2 and Asu Mare! in that order.

== DVD ==
In mid-2015 ¡Asu Mare! 2 in original DVD format in the markets of Lima.

== Sequel ==
At the end of 2015, Carlos Alcántara announced that there would be a possibility that ¡Asu Mare! 3. Despite the fact that director Ricardo Maldonado ruled out the making of ¡Asu mare! 3, Carlos Alcántara announced that the film should be released in 2018. Until now, the stand-up comedian has presented the play Cachineando as a continuation of ¡Asu Mare!
