= Leonardo Espinoza (footballer, born 1992) =

Chilean footballer

Personal information
- Full name: Leonardo Andrés Espinoza Solís
- Date of birth: 1 October 1992 (age 34)
- Place of birth: Santiago, Chile
- Height: 1.80 m (5 ft 11 in)
- Position: Forward

Team information
- Current team: Empire Strykers

Youth career
- Santiago Morning

Senior career*
Years	Team	Apps	(Gls)
2008–2017	Santiago Morning	75	(11)
2015	→ Deportes Ovalle (loan)	14	(0)
2017–2018	Deportes Iquique	25	(4)
2019	Deportes Temuco	22	(4)
2020–2021	Rangers	12	(1)
2021	Los Angeles Force	–	(–)
2021	Deportes Santa Cruz	5	(0)
2023–2024	MesoAmerica	–	(–)
2024–2025	Panathinaikos Chicago	–	(–)
2025	Empire Strykers (indoor)	9	(7)
2025	Newtown Pride	6	(2)
2026	Baltimore Blast (indoor)	–	(–)
2026	Hernandez United	–	(–)
2026–	Empire Strykers (indoor)	0	(0)

International career
- Chile U17
- Chile U20
- * Club domestic league appearances and goals

Leonardo Andrés Espinoza Solís (born 1 October 1992) is a Chilean former footballer who plays as a forward for American club Empire Strykers.

== Club career ==
A product of Santiago Morning, Espinoza was promoted to the first team in 2008 and made his professional debut the next year under Juan Antonio Pizzi. In the second half of 2015, he was loaned out to Deportes Ovalle in the Segunda División Profesional.

Following Santiago Morning, Espinoza spent seasons with Deportes Iquique, Deportes Temuco, Rangers de Talca in his homeland before moving to the United States to play for Los Angeles Force in 2021. With Deportes Iquique, he took part in the 2017 Copa Sudamericana.

Back to Chile, Espinoza joined Deportes Santa Cruz in September 2021.

Returning to the United States in 2023, Espinoza has played for MesoAmerica FC, Panathinaikos Chicago, Empire Strykers, Newtown Pride, Baltimore Blast and Hernandez United. He has helped Chilean players such as Franco Cabrera and Claudio Muñoz to join American clubs.

On 10 August 2026, Espinoza rejoined Empire Strykers for the 2026–27 season.

== International career ==
Espinoza represented Chile at under-17 and under 20 level.

== Personal life ==
Espinoza got a degree in business administration at the Gabriela Mistral University.
