= No te salves =

Studio album by Pelo Madueño
- Released: September 2008
- Recorded: 2007–2008
- Genre: Rock, pop
- Length: 45:00
- Label: Phantom Records
- Producer: Pelo Madueño

Pelo Madueño chronology
Ciudad Naufragio (2004)	No te salves (2008)	Nivel nacional (2012)

No te salves is the second studio album by Peruvian musician Pelo Madueño, released in September 2008 through the independent label Phantom Records. The album’s title references the poem of the same name by Uruguayan writer Mario Benedetti. It marked Madueño’s consolidation as a solo artist, blending urban rock and melodic pop influences.

== Background ==
Following the release of his debut solo album Ciudad Naufragio in 2004, Madueño spent several years writing and producing new material. No te salves was recorded between 2007 and 2008, with Madueño himself handling production duties. The record reflects themes of introspection, social commentary, and personal relationships.

== Reception ==
The album received positive reviews in the Peruvian music press, praised for its lyrical depth and polished production. The single "No hay estrellas en el mar" became one of Madueño’s most recognized songs, gaining radio airplay and cementing his reputation as a leading figure in contemporary Peruvian rock.

== Track listing ==
1. "No hay estrellas en el mar"
2. "El aire"
3. "No te salves"
4. "La distancia"
5. "En silencio"
6. "La ciudad está despierta"
7. "Un día más"
8. "Desaparecer"
9. "El tiempo"
10. "Final"
