= Locos de amor: mi primer amor =

- Theatrical release poster
- Directed by: Miguel Valladares Vives
- Written by: Bruno Ascenzo; Mariana Silva; Ítalo Cordano
- Produced by: Thiago Vernal
- Starring: Brando Gallesi; Thiago Vernal; Arianna Fernández; Ray del Castillo; María Gracia Mora; Alexia Barnechea; Vasco Rodríguez; Monserrat Brugué; Job Mansilla; Quique Niza; Juan Ramos
- Cinematography: Matías Lasarte
- Edited by: César Custodio; Gabriel Gardeazabal
- Production company: Tondero Producciones
- Release date: June 26, 2025
- Running time: 110 minutes
- Country: Peru
- Language: Spanish

Locos de amor: mi primer amor (lit. 'Crazy in love: my first love') is a 2025 Peruvian jukebox musical romantic comedy film directed by Miguel Valladares Vives (in his directorial debut) and written by Bruno Ascenzo, Mariana Silva and Ítalo Cordano. It is the fourth installment of the film series Locos de amor. It stars an ensemble cast made up of Brando Gallesi, Thiago Vernal, Arianna Fernández, Ray del Castillo, María Gracia Mora, Alexia Barnechea, Vasco Rodríguez, Monserrat Brugué, Job Mansilla, Quique Niza and Juan Ramos.

== Synopsis ==
During their senior year of school, a group of six teenage friends travel to Uruguay for their senior year, their last chance to be together before each goes their separate ways. There, they experience first love and heartbreak.

== Cast ==
- Brando Gallesi as Eduardo
- Thiago Vernal as Lucho
- Arianna Fernández as Milagritos
- Ray del Castillo as Miky
- María Gracia Mora as Veronika
- Alexia Barnechea as Evelyn
- Vasco Rodríguez as Tadeo
- Monserrat Brugué as Miss Pacca
- Job Mansilla as Professor Tito
- Quique Niza as Xavi
- Juan Ramos as Kike
- Joaquin Camelo as Vasco
- Franco Piffaretti as Seba

== Production ==
Principal photography lasted five weeks, beginning on September 3, 2024, in Punta del Este, Uruguay. Filming was also done on location in Montevideo and Peru.

== Release ==
The film was premiered on June 26, 2025, in Peruvian theaters.

== Box office ==
The film received mixed to negative reviews and sold fewer than 20,000 tickets in its first week in theaters. It ended its run in theaters with 34,000 viewers, becoming the lowest-grossing film in the series.
