= El gran León =

- Theatrical release poster
- Directed by: Ricardo Maldonado
- Written by: Marcos Carnevale; Hernan Rebalderia
- Produced by: Jorge Constantino; Carlos Alcántara Vilar; Marcos Carnevale
- Starring: Carlos Alcántara Vilar; Gianella Neyra
- Cinematography: Miguel Valencia
- Edited by: Barney Elliott; Gino Moreno
- Music by: José San Miguel; Carlos San Miguel
- Production company: Tondero Producciones
- Distributed by: Tondero Producciones
- Release date: December 28, 2017
- Running time: 100 minutes
- Country: Peru
- Language: Spanish

El gran León (lit. 'The great León') is a 2017 Peruvian romantic comedy film directed by Ricardo Maldonado and written by Marcos Carnevale & Hernan Rebalderia. It stars Carlos Alcántara and Gianella Neyra. It was released on December 28, 2017, in Peruvian theaters. This film is a remake of the Argentine film Corazón de León.

== Synopsis ==
León Godoy measures one meter thirty-six centimeters and is not intimidated by anyone. Less so before Ivana Cornejo, a beautiful divorced lawyer whom he meets by chance in life and with whom an immediate connection arises. Both must face and combat social prejudices -their own and others-, to verify that great love stories always present themselves in the least imagined ways.

== Cast ==
- Carlos Alcántara as León Godoy
- Gianella Neyra as Ivana Cornejo
- Cristian Rivero as Diego Bisoni
- Hernán Romero as Ernesto
- Katia Condos as Sabrina
- Patricia Portocarrero as Corina
- Stefano Tosso as Toto
- Martha Figueroa as Adriana

== Reception ==
=== Box-office ===
The film brought 45,566 people to theaters on its first day, ending its opening weekend with over 300,000 viewers.

=== Critical reception ===
El Comercio negatively criticized the film, saying, "El gran León is the creative laziness of the director, who in most of the film is dedicated to tracing, sometimes shot by shot, the original version... In the original version, the main actor achieves a character full of charm, sympathy, intelligence, and even a share of sadness, melancholic or sentimental reverie more typical of a good classic comedy. Alcántara, on the other hand, without the possibility of going very far with respect to his register of 'stand-up comedy' or of Creole picaresque, looks uncomfortable, limited, wrapped in a character that he does not understand".
