= Locos de amor =

- Theatrical release poster
- Directed by: Frank Pérez-Garland
- Written by: Bruno Ascenzo; Mariana Silva
- Produced by: Marco Moscoso
- Starring: Gianella Neyra; Jimena Lindo; Lorena Caravedo; Rossana Fernández Maldonado; Giovanni Ciccia; Gonzalo Revoredo; Carlos Carlín; Gonzalo Torres; Nicolás Galindo; Claudia Berninzon; Stefano Salvini; Ana Cecilia Natteri
- Cinematography: Pato Fuster
- Edited by: Javier Fuentes-León; Angela Vera Temoche
- Music by: José Manuel Barrios
- Production company: Tondero Films
- Distributed by: Tondero Films
- Release date: May 5, 2016
- Running time: 110 minutes
- Country: Peru
- Language: Spanish

Locos de amor (lit. 'Crazy in love') is a 2016 Peruvian jukebox musical romantic comedy film directed by Frank Pérez-Garland and written by Bruno Ascenzo and Mariana Silva. It stars Lorena Caravedo, Giovanni Ciccia, Carlos Carlín, Jimena Lindo, Gonzalo Torres, Rossana Fernández Maldonado, Nicolás Galindo and Gianella Neyra. It was released on May 5, 2016, in Peruvian theaters.

== Plot ==
The film tells the parallel stories of Lucía, Viviana, Gloria and Fernanda, four cousins who live in the same residence and face the various situations that life throws at them: loves, heartbreaks and endless tragicomic adventures, all within the framework of funny songs performed by the same actors.

Gloria is married to Martín and they have a son. Your period does not come and you think you are pregnant. When she goes to the doctor, the doctor tells her that she is entering menopause. Martín ignores Gloria's mood swings in this new stage of her life, so she decides to end her relationship with him. Going to party with Lucía, Viviana and Fernanda, he meets up with a friend from school, Santi Santibáñez, with whom he lives more than one adrenaline experience such as paragliding, buying a motorcycle and going to a youth disco. Noticing Santi's immaturity, Gloria goes to live with her sister Fernanda. Martín recognizes that he wasn't doing anything and decides to go and win her back, until he succeeds.

Fernanda is Gloria's younger sister, who thinks she will be promoted at her job; however, she ends up getting fired. This stresses her out and brings her physical problems, so her cousin Viviana recommends that she go do yoga. There she meets Juan Carlos who is the residential instructor, with whom she falls in love and with whom she lives a torrid romance. Fernanda unexpectedly becomes pregnant, but she does not want a serious relationship because he is much younger than her age. Juan Carlos decides to assume his responsibility showing that although young, he is very mature. Knowing this, Fernanda agrees to start a stable relationship with him.

Viviana, cousin of Gloria and Fernanda and a hairdresser at the residence, is married to Ignacio and is the mother of 2 children, but their love relationship is going very badly and to improve the situation, she plans a romantic evening in a hotel. However, Ignacio confesses that he is being unfaithful to him with Dalia, a worker at his company. Viviana breaks off the relationship and becomes more independent. Ignacio recognizes his mistake and seeks Viviana's forgiveness, but it is already too late for him.

On the other hand, the central story of the 4 is that of Lucía, the cousin of the three and a journalist who shares a room with Rodrigo, her co-worker, and has Gabriel, a congresswoman's lawyer, as a boyfriend; the latter buys a bachelor apartment and surprises Lucía. She expected a marriage proposal and is disappointed because he is selfish, buys her and does not think about the future as a relationship. Lucía finally accepts the purchase, but on one of the visits she makes to the apartment she finds a garment belonging to another woman, which is why she breaks off the relationship with Gabriel. Rodrigo, her roommate, who lived in love with her, comforts her and they fall in love. At the newscast where Lucía works, Rodrigo omits some information from her, so she breaks up with him too, but the next day she returns to ask for forgiveness and they reconcile. Finally both get married at the end of the film with the presence of all the characters.

The public will listen to fragments of romantic songs in Spanish from the 20th century, such as "Cosas del amor" by Ana Gabriel, "Dueño de nada" by José Luis Rodríguez and the same "Locos de Amor" by Yordano, sung in a comedic tone by this funny cast.

== Cast ==
- Gianella Neyra as Lucia
- Giovanni Ciccia as Rodrigo
- Gonzalo Revoredo as Gabriel
- Rossana Fernández Maldonado as Viviana
- Gonzalo Torres as Ignacio
- Claudia Berninzon as Dahlia
- Jimena Lindo as Fernanda
- Nicolas Galindo as Juan Carlos
- Lorena Caravedo as Glory
- Carlos Carlin as Martin
- Stefano Salvini as Lucas
- Bernie Paz as Santiago "Santi" Santibanez
- Ana Cecilia Natteri as Mrs. Carmela
- Mayra Goñi as Josefa
- Vanessa Saba
- Sofia Rocha

== Musical Themes ==
During the film you can listen to fragments of songs by Mocedades, Pimpinela, Camilo Sesto, among others. In total 18 songs are sung.

- "Vivir así es morir de amor" by Camilo Sesto
- "Bazar" by Flans
- "Pobre Diablo" by Emmanuel
- "Que sabe nadie" by Raphael
- "Piel de Ángel" (A escondidas) by Camilo Sesto
- "Quererte a ti" by Ángela Carrasco
- "A esa" by Pimpinela
- "Brindaremos por él" by Massiel
- "Dueño de nada" by José Luis Rodríguez "El Puma"
- "Si no te hubieras ido" by Marco Antonio Solís
- "Carmín" by Roxana Valdivieso
- "Ya te olvidé" by Yuridia
- "Cosas del amor" by Ana Gabriel y Vikki Carr
- "Eres tú" by Mocedades
- "Teorema" by Miguel Bosé
- "Gloria" by Umberto Tozzi
- "Sólo con un beso" by Ricardo Montaner
- "Locos de Amor" by Yordano
- "Quiero Ser" by Menudo (Credits)

== Reception ==
It reached one million viewers two months after its premiere.

=== Critical reception ===
The film received mixed reviews:

- The newspaper El Comercio qualifies it as "a good musical film, but a bad script."
- Another critic said: "“Locos de amor” is a missed opportunity to make a great musical film in Peru."

== Sequel ==
In 2017 a sequel was announced for 2018, Locos de amor 2 (Crazy in love 2), this time starring Carlos Alcántara, Johanna San Miguel, Wendy Ramos, Vanessa Saba, Marco Zunino, Érika Villalobos, Paul Vega and Bruno Ascenzo. It was released on February 14, 2018.
