= Pelo Madueño =

Peruvian singer-songwriter, producer, actor, and broadcaster

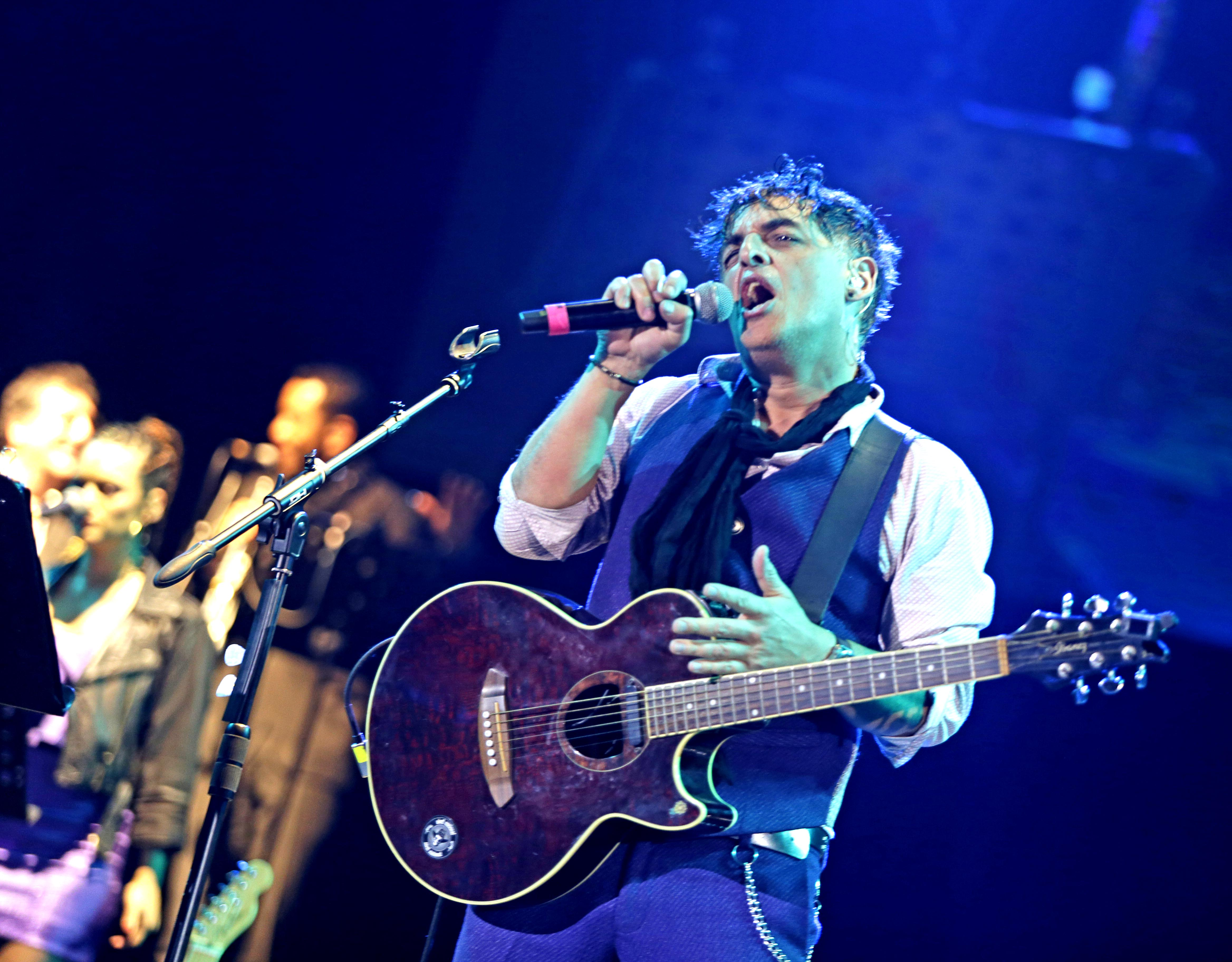

Background information
- Also known as: Loro Drogo; Pelo Parao
- Born: Jorge Enrique Madueño Vizurraga; 8 March 1968 (age 58); Lima, Peru
- Genres: Pop rock, alternative rock, punk rock, rock subterráneo
- Occupations: Singer-songwriter, actor
- Instruments: Guitar; Percussion; Voice
- Years active: 1984–present
- Labels: Narcosis Producciones; Pasajeros del Horror; Sony Music; Solver Records
- Website: pelomadueno.com

Jorge Enrique Madueño Vizurraga (born 8 March 1968), better known by his stage name Pelo Madueño, is a Peruvian singer-songwriter, producer, actor, and broadcaster. He was the drummer of the rock subterráneo (underground rock) bands Narcosis (1984–1986) and Eructo Maldonado (1986–1988). In 1988 he joined the Miki González band as a drummer, with which he moved away from punk and ventured into pop rock. In 1992 he formed the band La Liga del Sueño as a vocalist, guitarist, and percussionist, releasing three studio albums and achieving fame at a national level. He has been a producer for bands such as Madre Matilda, Camarón Jackson, and Ves Tal Vez. After the dissolution of La Liga del Sueño in 2000, he embarked on a solo career.

As an actor he was part of Patacláun theater seasons and has appeared in Peruvian films such as Ciudad de M. He currently hosts the program Radio BBVA on Radio Oxígeno.

== Career with Narcosis ==
In 1984 at age 16, Pelo Madueño was part of the rock subterráneo band Narcosis as a drummer, along with Wicho García on vocals and Fernando "Cachorro" Vial on guitar. With Narcosis he recorded the demo Primera dosis, which would be reissued on CD in 2000. The group broke up in 1986 after the concert "Acto de Magia".

== Between Narcosis and La Liga del Sueño ==
In 1985, together with Rafael Hurtado and Félix Torrealva, Madueño formed the rock subterráneo group Eructo Maldonado, with whom he released the albums Qué pachó? (1986) and Rómpele la pechuga! (1988). At the same time, he began to appear on some television programs and to move away from rock subterráneo. During some recording sessions in 1986, he met Miki González, who invited him to be a drummer in his band, one of the most successful and innovative pop rock groups at that time. With them he recorded the LPs Tantas veces (1987) and Nunca les creí (1989).

== Career with La Liga del Sueño ==
In 1991 Pelo Madueño joined up with other artists, mostly from rock subterráneo, and after experimenting with different formations and sounds, they began to perform in Lima and the provinces. They took the name La Liga del Sueño (The Dream League), and with various lineups, the band released the albums Al derecho y al revés (1994), Por Tierra (1996), and Mundo Cachina (1998).

== Solo career ==
After La Liga del Sueño went on hiatus in 2000, Madueño traveled to Spain and released his first solo album in July 2004, entitled Ciudad Naufragio. Its first single was "Alma de 80's", the video for which was recorded in the streets of Madrid. The album also features "Nuestro secreto", a duet sung with Joaquín Sabina.

In September 2008, he released his second production entitled No te salves, with the first single "Es hora".

In March 2009, along with Gian Marco, Marcello Motta, Joaquín Mariátegui, and Daniel F, he formed the charity supergroup El Enredo. That May he presented The Lovecats, a musical project that recreates rock songs in jazz versions. In July he released the second single from No te salves, titled "No hay estrellas en el mar", which features a black-and-white video directed by Tito Köster, with some scenes shot at the Gran Hotel Bolivar. In October he participated in the Movistar Expo Rock held in Chiclayo. In March 2010 he released the third single from the album, titled "Amiga". On 13 November he played at the Beer Garden, an event held in Arequipa, together with Andrés Calamaro and Jhovan Tomašević.

Madueño performed a sold-out concert on 20 June 2016 at the Gran Teatro Nacional in Lima, featuring songs from his time in La Liga del Sueño and his solo albums. This was recorded and released as the live album and DVD 20 años al borde.

He currently hosts the show Radio BBVA on Radio Oxígeno.

== Discography ==
=== Albums ===
==== With Miki Gonzalez ====
- Tantas veces (LP, 1987)
- Nunca les creí (LP, 1989)

==== With La Liga del Sueño ====
- Al derecho y al revés (1994)
- Por Tierra (1996)
- Mundo Cachina (1998)

==== Solo ====
- Ciudad Naufragio (2004)
- No te salves (2009)
- Nivel nacional (2012)
- 20 años al borde (live)

=== Music videos ===
==== With La Liga del Sueño ====
- "Mala sangre" (1994)
- "La peor de las guerras" (1996)
- "Semilla negra" (1998)
- "No es amor" (1998)

==== Solo ====
- "Alma de 80's" (2004)
- "Nuestro secreto" (2006)
- "Es hora" (2008)
- "No hay estrellas en el mar" (2009)
- "Amiga" (2010)
- "No te salves" (2011)
- "Calavera reguetón" (2012)
- "Es por amor" (2012)
- "Arena y blue" (2013)
