= Carlos Alcántara (actor) =

Peruvian stand-up comedian and actor (born 1964)

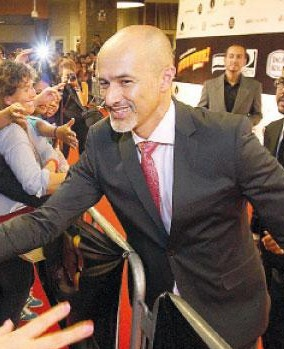
- Carlos Alcántara at the Asu Mare pre-premiere
- Born: Carlos Alberto Alcántara Vilar; 12 November 1964 (age 61); Lima, Peru
- Other name: Cachín
- Occupations: Stand-up comedian and actor
- Years active: 1981–present
- Spouse: Jossie Lindley (m. 2010)
- Children: 3

Carlos Alberto Alcántara Vilar (born 12 November 1964) also known as Cachín or Machín (due to the character he was cast in Pataclaun) is a Peruvian stand-up comedian and actor.

== Personal life ==
He was born in Lima. Alcantara grew up in a working-class family, in the Unidad Vecinal de Mirones in Cercado de Lima. Carlos first appeared in a film with Los 7 pecados capitales (The 7 Deadly Sins) of Leonidas Zegarra, in 1981 at age 17.

In 2010, after 17 years together, Alcántara married Jossie Lindley. They have three children.

== Career ==
Alcántara joined the Drama Club of Lima, where he debuted as an actor in 1986 with works like La malquerida, Los tres mosqueteros, Cuatro historias de alquiler, La mujer del año and Viva el duque nuestro dueño.

In 1991, he led the children's program Yan-Ken-Po with Gloria María Solari and Johanna San Miguel

Alcántara had participated as an extra and in small roles in various soap operas of the time, but managed high popularity as the star of Patacláun (1997–1999) playing "Machin" that due to the success of the plays of Patacláun.

Then, he appeared on the films Muerto de amor (2002), Ojos que no ven (2003), Polvo enamorado (2003) and Doble Juego (2004).

He participated in various television projects, until they started the television miniseries La gran sangre, which was broadcast on Frecuencia Latina, having him as the main character of the series where he represented "El Dragón", proficient character wielding martial arts and was the leader of an association of urban heroes along with "Mandril" (Pietro Sibille) and "Tony Blades" (Aldo Miyashiro). He finished the project participating in La gran sangre: la película in 2007.

In 2007 he began his one-person show Asu Mare, with which in the following years has made presentations to the Peruvian community abroad. He also appeared in the TV show El santo convento.

In 2008 he competed in the dance reality show Bailando por un sueño (Perú), which won the first season ended.

From 2009 to 2011 Alcántar was Dance jury member of the dance reality show El Gran Show.

In February 2011, Alcántara participated in the International Humor Festival organised by the Caracol of Colombia.

On April 11, 2013, the film Asu Mare, was released. It was inspired by his one-person show of the same name, starring and co-produced by Alcantara. It became the highest-grossing film in all of Peru with about twelve million dollars receipts at the box office.

== Television ==
=== Series and telenovelas ===
- Solo por ti (1981)
- El hombre que debe morir (1989)
- Mala mujer (1992)
- El ángel vengador: Calígula (1994)
- Obsesión (1996) as Samuel Iturrino.
- Patacláun (1997–1999) as Machín/Don Carloncho/Nandito.
- Cosas del amor (1998)
- Pobre diabla (2000) as Ramón Pedraza.
- Cazando a un millonario (2001) as Nero.
- Carita de atún (2002–2003) as Ángel.
- El santo convento (2007–2008) as Don Carloncho.

=== Miniseries ===
- Lobos de Mar (2005) as Leonardo.
- La gran sangre (2006) as "El Dragón".
- La gran sangre 2: contra Las diosas malditas (2006) as "El Dragón".
- La gran sangre 3: el encuentro final (2006) as "El Dragón".
- Broders (2010) as Charly González.

=== Programs ===
- Yan Kem Po (1991)
- Lima limón (2005), Co-host.
- Bailando por un Sueño (Perú) (2008), Winner of the first season.
- El Show de los sueños (Perú) (2009), Dance jury member.
- El Gran Show (2010), Dance jury member.
- El Gran Show (2011), Dance jury member.

== Films ==
- Los 7 pecados capitales (1981)
- Nunca más, lo juro (1991)
- Muerto de amor (2002)
- Ojos que no ven (2003) as Martín Chauca
- Polvo enamorado (2003) as Hernando
- Doble juego (2004) as Miguelón
- La gran sangre: la película (2007) as "El Dragón"
- ¡Asu mare! (2013)
- A los 40 (2014)
- ¡Asu mare! 2 (2015)
- Lusers (2015)
- El gran León (2017)
- Cebiche de tiburón (2017)
- Locos de amor 2 (2018)
- ¡Asu mare! 3 (2018)
- The House of Snails (2021) as Padre Benito
- Our (Perfect) Xmas Retreat (2021)
- She’s Just Like Me (2022)
- ¡Asu mare! Los amigos (2023)
- The Year of the Tiger (2023) as Samsa
- Treasure Hunters (2024) as Clemente Mondego

== Theatre ==
- Los tres mosqueteros (1987) as Aramis.
- Pataclaun en la ciudad (1993)
- Pataclaun en...rollado (1994)
- Pataclaun busca pareja (1996)
- Pataclaun en...venta (2000)
- El código Carlinchi (2005), stand-up comedy.
- Asu Mare (2007–2011), stand-up comedy.

== Image ==
Alcantara has appeared in various ads and commercials for the brand Brahma Beer in Peru, participating in television commercials almost every product.
