= Valentina valiente =

Peruvian telenovela

- Genre: Telenovela
- Created by: Miguel Zuloaga; Augusto Cabada
- Inspired by: Los ricos también lloran by Inés Rodena
- Written by: Augusto Cabada; Mariana Silva; Fortunata Barrios; Ítalo Cordano; Alexa Centurión; Augusto Gutiérrez; Jesús Álvarez
- Directed by: Jorge Tapia; Toño Vega; Miguel Zuloaga
- Starring: Mayra Goñi; Rodrigo Brand
- Theme music composer: Jorge «Chino» Sabogal & Walter Yaipén
- Opening theme: "Chica valiente" by Mayra Goñi & Hermanos Yaipén
- Composer: Jorge "Chino" Sabogal
- Country of origin: Peru
- Original language: Spanish

Production
- Executive producer: Nataly Mendoza Rodríguez
- Producers: Carol Ríos Polastri; Guillermo Lay Arcos
- Camera setup: Multi-camera
- Production company: Chasqui Producciones

Original release
- Network: Latina Televisión
- Release: 4 March 2026 – present

Valentina valiente is a Peruvian telenovela created by Miguel Zuloaga and Augusto Cabada. The series is inspired by the Mexican telenovela Los ricos también lloran. It premiered on Latina Televisión from 4 March 2026. The series stars Mayra Goñi and Rodrigo Brand.

== Plot ==
Valentina Ramos is a young woman from San Juan de Miraflores, who, along with her siblings, makes a living singing and playing music on buses and on the street, to help her grandmother Dolores García. In the town square, she meets Alejandro Osores, a wealthy man, whom she falls in love with. However, it is suspected that Valentina is the granddaughter of Edmundo Echegaray, a millionaire elderly man and partner of Frida Colmenares, who is characterized as a woman with bad intentions, with the goal of taking Edmundo's fortune, in addition to being the suspect of the fire at the Echegaray mansion. In addition, Macarena Maguiña, Alejandro's girlfriend and Frida's daughter, does not allow Valentina to be with Alejandro because they are both from different worlds. Valentina will face obstacles because of her love for Alejandro, with Macarena and her mother Frida make her life impossible.

== Cast ==
- Mayra Goñi as Valentina Ramos García
- Rodrigo Brand as Alejandro Osores
- Alessa Wichtel as Macarena Maguiña Colmenares
- Mariel Ocampo as Frida Colmenares Rossi
- Roberto Moll as Edmundo Echegaray Salinas
- Haydeé Cáceres as Dolores Asunta García Panizo
- Josué Subauste as Lolo Ramos García
- Gabriel Quintana as Javier "Chubi" Ramos García
- Matthew Lizarbe as Antonio "Tony" Ramos García
- Leandra Núñez as Kathy Varilla Peña
- Gustavo Borjas as Wilfredo Néstor Varilla Neyra
- Brahian Labarca as Rocky Julca Cruz
- Yeider Oré as Bryan Colchado Rojas
- Pierina Carcelén as Elsa Cecilia Cruz Morante
- Mara Minor as Jennifer "Jenny" Julca Cruz
- Katia Condos as Susana
- Flor Castillo as Guadalupe "Lupe" Rojas Farfán
- Ekaterina Konysheva as Ximena Aspíllaga
- Pietro Sibille as Leopoldo "Leo" Julca
- Axah as Brisa Garland
- Sebastián Olivencia as Gabriel Álvarez Calderón
- Patricia Barreto as Rita Quintana
- Mauricio Abad as Diego Navarro
- Milett Figueroa as Bárbara

== Reception ==
The telenovela premiered on 4 March 2026, positioning itself in eleventh place in the audience during primetime with a percentage of 5.7 points, being surpassed by the reality show Esto es guerra airing on América Televisión.
