= Tati Alcántara =

Peruvian actress

- Born: Tatiana Alcántara; Lima, Peru
- Other name: Tati
- Occupations: Actress, dancer, choreographer, singer, model & entrepreneur

Tatiana Alcántara known as Tati Alcántara is a Peruvian actress, dancer, choreographer, singer, model & entrepreneur. She currently runs her own dance academy called "ESCENI-K".

== Career ==
In 2004, she played Sandra Luna in the teen telenovela Besos Robados. In May 2009, she participated in the play Cabaret, as Lulu. The following year she starred alongside Marco Zunino, the musical Rent, as Mimi. In June 2011 she participated in the musical West Side Story.

In September 2011, she was involved in two programs in the dance reality show El Gran Show, replacing Maricielo Effio. Two months later, she participated in El Gran Show (2011): Reyes del Show.

In May 2012 she played Velma Kelly in the musical Chicago.

== Theatre ==
List of credits in theatre as an actress
Year	Title	Role	Notes
2005	La bella y la bestia	Bella	Lead role
2009	Crónicas de días enteros, de noches enteras	Singer woman	Teatro de la Alianza Francesa
2009	Cabaret	Lulu	Teatro Segura; May 13—June 21; October 1—October 31
2010	Rent	Mimi	Lead role November 18—November 28
2010	El musical 2010	Various roles	May 12—June 27
2011	Amor sin barreras (West side story)	Anita	Teatro Municipal de Lima; June 2—July 10
2012	Naturaleza muerta	Gabriela	Lead role
2012	Chicago	Velma Kelly	Lead role Teatro Municipal de Lima; June 7—July 22
2012	Company	Amy	

== Filmography ==
List of television credits as an actress
Year	Title	Role	Notes
2004	Besos robados	Sandra Luna	
2006	Amores como el nuestro	María Pía	
2024	Pituca sin lucas	Loretta Diez Canseco	

List of television credits as herself
Year	Title	Role	Notes
2007	Yala tengo	Host	
2010	Hola a todos	Choreographer	Dance segment
2010	Habacilar: Amigos y rivales	Contestant	Winner
2011	El gran show	Contestant	2 episodes
2011	El gran show: reyes del show	Contestant	5º Place
