= Nosequien y Los Nosecuantos =

Nosequien Y Los Nosecuantos
- Origin: Barranco, Lima, Peru
- Genres: Pop rock, experimental rock, ska
- Years active: 1988–2014, 2023–present
- Labels: Discos Delta, Discos Hispanos, Dea Music, Dalai Records, Sony Music
- Members: Raúl Romero; Héctor Llosa; Fernando Ríos>br>Pablo Boner; Pedro Silva

Nosequien y Los Nosecuantos, abbreviated to NSQ y NSC, is a Peruvian ska-rock band that has experimented with different genres and styles, from rap and reggae to Peruvian waltz and ska, and adds satiric elements, fronted by singer, comedian and TV host Raúl Romero, who used his comedic theatrical skills to add a unique experience in concerts.

== History ==
The band originated in the Lima district of Barranco in 1988, initially composed of Germán Vargas and Fernando Ríos, who shared influences from new wave and Latin American pop rock. Later, Raúl Romero and Alfredo Sillau, friends from university and work respectively, joined. Ricardo Mevius briefly joined as a guitarist. The band adopted a humorous and satirical style, both in their lyrics and their performances.

The band's name was suggested by Germán Vargas and accompanied by a logo designed with his sister, who informally took on the role of representative. They debuted that same year at the Pontifical Catholic University of Peru. In 1990 they added Jorge "Coco" Salazar on keyboards, completing the lineup that would record their first album.

Their first album, No somos nada , was recorded at Miki González 's studios. It included tracks such as "Vanidad," composed at the request of their label for radio, and "Magdalena," which became their biggest hit. The latter was notable for its use of euphemisms and double entendres.

Some songs, such as "Aló Gisela," "La Pacha," and "El Verano," faced accusations of plagiarism, which led to co-authorship being attributed to other composers. Tracks like "Las Torres", although not included on this album, began to gain popularity in their live performances.

The second album, Con el respeto que se merecen, incorporated a more political tone, reflecting the situation in Peru after the change of government in 1990. Germán Vargas left the band before recording due to internal disagreements. New members included Pedro Silva (drums) and Pablo Boner (keyboards).

The album included tracks such as "Las Torres ," a satire on terrorism and political corruption during the 1980s and 90s, and "Los Patos y las Patas," about social differences on Lima's beaches. Other songs stood out for their biting humor, such as "El rap del chicle choncholí" and "Monstruo de Armendáriz." In 1994, after a plagiarism dispute with the group Menudo, NSQ obtained recognition as the author of "Los Patos y las Patas."

In 1992 they released the compilation album Lo mejor (todo) de... , followed by 11 porotazos súper bailables (1993), which showed improvements in production and included hits such as "Mamá, mamá, mamá, no te robes mi Yamaha," "Yo fui lorna," and "Vargas Llosa." Political and social references continued, as well as satires of public figures.

In 1994 they released another compilation album, Etiqueta negra. In 1995 they released Walter, an album that marked a shift towards more social and environmental themes, with songs like "Ballena azul" and "Sube nomás". After this release, Alfredo Sillau left the band permanently, and they entered a period of inactivity.

In 2000, the band reappeared with Amorfo , featuring the singles "Sin calzoncito" and "Sinfonía de amor." The following year they released Nadie nos quitará lo bailado , a compilation album aimed at internationalization, which was distributed in Colombia, Ecuador, and Venezuela through Sony Music.

In 2004, they released Pisco Sour with the single "Yo de ti," achieving some impact in Latin American markets. During those years, they performed in Peru, the United States, and Europe, re-recording some of their songs for international audiences.

In 2006, Pedro Silva left the band and was replaced by Laureano Rigol. Although they composed new songs, no new albums were released. In 2010, for their twentieth anniversary, their discography was remastered under the title XX larga dura, a compilation album that includes previously unreleased material.

In 2011, the band ceased its activities. In 2013, Raúl Romero confirmed his departure, and in 2014 he publicly declared the group's dissolution. In April 2023, Fernando Ríos, Alfredo Sillau, Pedro Silva, and Pablo Boner announced their return under the name Nosecuántos.

== Members ==
- Raúl Romero - vocals
- Héctor Llosa - guitar
- Fernando Ríos - bass
- Pablo Boner - keyboard
- Laureano Rigol - drums

Former:

- Pedro Silva - drums
- Germán Vargas - drums (1989-1990)
- Jorge Salazar - keyboard, flute (1989-1990)
- Alfredo Sillau - guitar, backing vocals (1989-1995)
- Ricardo Mevius - guitar (1989)
- Gonzalo Torres - bass (1991)

== Discography ==
=== Studio albums ===
- No somos nada (1989)
- Con el respeto que se merecen (1991)
- 11 porotazos super bailables (1993)
- Walter (1995)
- Amorfo (2000)
- Pisco sour (2004)

=== Compilation albums ===
- Lo mejor (todo) de... Nosequien y los Nosecuantos (1992)
- Etiqueta negra (1994)
- Nadie nos quitará lo bailado (2001)
- XX larga duración (2011)
