= ¡Asu mare! =

Asu Mare
- Theatrical poster
- Directed by: Ricardo Maldonado
- Written by: Carlos Alcántara
- Produced by: Miguel Valladares; Carlos Alcántara
- Starring: Carlos Alcántara; Ana Cecilia Natteri; Gisela Ponce de León; Emilia Drago
- Music by: José San Miguel; Carlos San Miguel
- Production company: Tondero Films
- Distributed by: New Century Films
- Release date: 11 April 2013
- Running time: 100 minutes
- Country: Peru
- Language: Spanish
- Budget: 700 000 USD
- Box office: 11 852 786 USD

¡Asu Mare! is a 2013 Peruvian biographical comedy film. It is a movie adaptation of the stand-up comedy show by the same name by Carlos Alcántara, starring himself. Directed by Ricardo Maldonado (in his directorial debut) and produced by Tondero Films, the film premiered on 11 April 2013 nationwide.

This film brings together most of the actors from the Peruvian sitcom Pataclaun (1997—99).

== Plot ==
The story follows the adventures of Carlos Alcántara on his way to fame from his childhood in the "Unidad Vecinal Mirones". It is a recreation of his youth and experiences with his mother. In the beginning he explains how he started to admire music but later realized that he could not sing. So he later tried being an actor but got framed in the process. Later on, he finds himself down on his luck but a young boy who was a street performer gives him his clown nose and its from there that he plans to get some acting lessons. Later, he and a couple of close friends make a team known as Pataclaun that becomes a great hit in Peru. From there he gets to be well known around the country and gets fame. In the end he thanks his mom for all the support she gave him in the good and bad times.

== Cast ==
- Carlos Alcántara as himself
- Ana Cecilia Natteri as Isabel "Chabela" Vilar
- Gisela Ponce de León as Isabel "Chabela" Vilar (young)
- Emilia Drago as Emilia
- Dayiro Castañeda as Carlos Alcántara (child)
- Santiago Suárez as Carlos Alcántara (young)
- Andrés Salas as Culicich
- Anahí de Cárdenas as Emilia's friend
- Franco Cabrera as Carlos's friend

=== Guest appearances ===
- Gisela Valcárcel as herself
- Tatiana Astengo as Marujita
- Carlos Carlín as janitor
- Wendy Ramos as gypsy
- Johanna San Miguel as Socorro
- Gonzalo Torres as professor
- Katia Condos as lady at the party

=== Other appearances ===
- Juan Manuel Ochoa as Monfu
- Mario Velásquez as swindler
- Carlos Cano as Carlos's uncle
- Daniel Marquina as soldier
- Jossie Lindley as Emilia's mom
- Carolina Cano as girl at the beach
- Ana Rosa Liendo as teacher
- Carlos Cabrera as Ferrando
- Katia Palma as Carlos's aunt

== Box office ==
During the first week of May 14, 2013, the movie broke all time-records in Peru as the viewership increased to 2.34 million people compared to 2.31 million people from Ice Age 4 in 2012. It also broke records for the most viewers on opening day, and the fastest film to reach one million in ticket sales. It is the second highest grossing Peruvian film after The Motorcycle Diaries.

== Sequel ==
A sequel, titled ¡Asu mare! 2 was released on April 9, 2015. Ricardo Maldonado returned as director and Carlos Alcántara returned as writer and the protagonist
