= She's Just Like Me =

- Theatrical release poster
- Spanish: Igualita a mí
- Directed by: Felipe Martínez Amador
- Written by: Juan Vera; Daniel Cuparo; Mariano Vera
- Starring: Carlos Alcántara; Daniela Camaiora
- Cinematography: Nicolás Escobar Pazos
- Edited by: Chino Pinto
- Music by: Jorge 'Awelo' Miranda
- Production company: Tondero Producciones
- Distributed by: Tondero Producciones
- Release date: June 16, 2022
- Running time: 100 minutes
- Country: Peru
- Language: Spanish

She's Just Like Me (Spanish: Igualita a mí, lit. 'Equal to me') is a 2022 Peruvian comedy film directed by Felipe Martínez Amador and written by Juan Vera, Daniel Cuparo & Mariano Vera. It is a remake of the 2010 Argentine film Igualita a mí. It stars Carlos Alcántara and Daniela Camaiora. It premiered on June 16, 2022, in Peruvian theaters.

== Synopsis ==
Fredy, a 48-year-old bachelor with no children, continues to live as if he were a teenager. He loves staying up all night, he thinks he's a kid, and he's an eternal seducer of thirty-somethings. One night he meets Aylín, a 30-year-old girl, who arrives in Lima, and surprises him that she thinks she is his daughter. After the DNA test, the result confirms that, not only is he her father, but that Aylín is also pregnant by her ex-boyfriend. Father and future grandfather overnight! Fredy's life takes a 180 degree turn when he least expected it. Will you be prepared for everything that comes?

== Cast ==
The actors participating in this film are:

- Carlos Alcántara as Fredy
- Daniela Camairoa as Aylín
- Andrea Luna
- Renato Rueda
- Anahí de Cardenas
- Maju Mantilla
- Malory Vargas
- Melissa Paredes
- Sonia Seminario

== Production ==
Principal photography began at the end of October 2019 and lasted for 5 weeks in total.

== Release ==
She’s Just Like Me was scheduled to premiere in August 2020 in Peruvian theaters, but it was canceled due to the COVID-19 pandemic. Finally, it was released on June 16, 2022, in Peruvian theaters.
