= Sofía Rocha =

Peruvian actress (1967–2019)

- Born: Ana Sofía Verónica Rocha Azcurra; 4 October 1967; Lima, Peru
- Died: 25 March 2019 (aged 51); San Miguel, Lima, Peru
- Occupation: Actress

Ana Sofía Verónica Rocha Azcurra (4 October 1967 – 25 March 2019) was a Peruvian actress of theater, cinema and television.

== Biography ==
Rocha was trained as an actress in the Teatro del Sol group, the Umbral workshop and the LAMDA workshop. In 1994 she appeared in the television series Los de arriba y los de abajo. Later, she participated in the productions Los unos y los otros, Todo se vende todo se compra and Escándalo.

In 2006 she acted in the work Antígona, directed by Roberto Ángeles. She recorded for the film El acuarelista, which premiered the following year.

In 2007 she starred in the work A Marriage in Boston and later traveled to London, England, to take body language courses at The London Academy of Music and Dramatic Art. Rocha returned to Peru in 2010 and then starred in the work of Greek tragedy Medea, directed by Gisela Cárdenas.

In 2011 she starred in the children's theater play El juego de la Oca, and also participated in Sangre como flores, La pasión según García Lorca, Entonces Alicia cayó and La cura en Troya. On television she was in the Gamarra miniseries and Yo no me llamo Natacha 2.

In 2012 she appeared in the play El lenguaje de las sirenas, under the direction of Mariana de Althaus, and later participated in the work Nuestro pueblo.

In 2013 she acted in Corazón normal, under the direction of Juan Carlos Fisher. She also acted in Ricardo III. Rocha participated in the film A los 40 by Bruno Ascenzo, released in 2014.

On March 25, 2019, she was found dead in the district of San Miguel, after a fall from the sixth floor of the building where she lived.
