= Franco Cabrera =

Chilean footballer (born 1983)

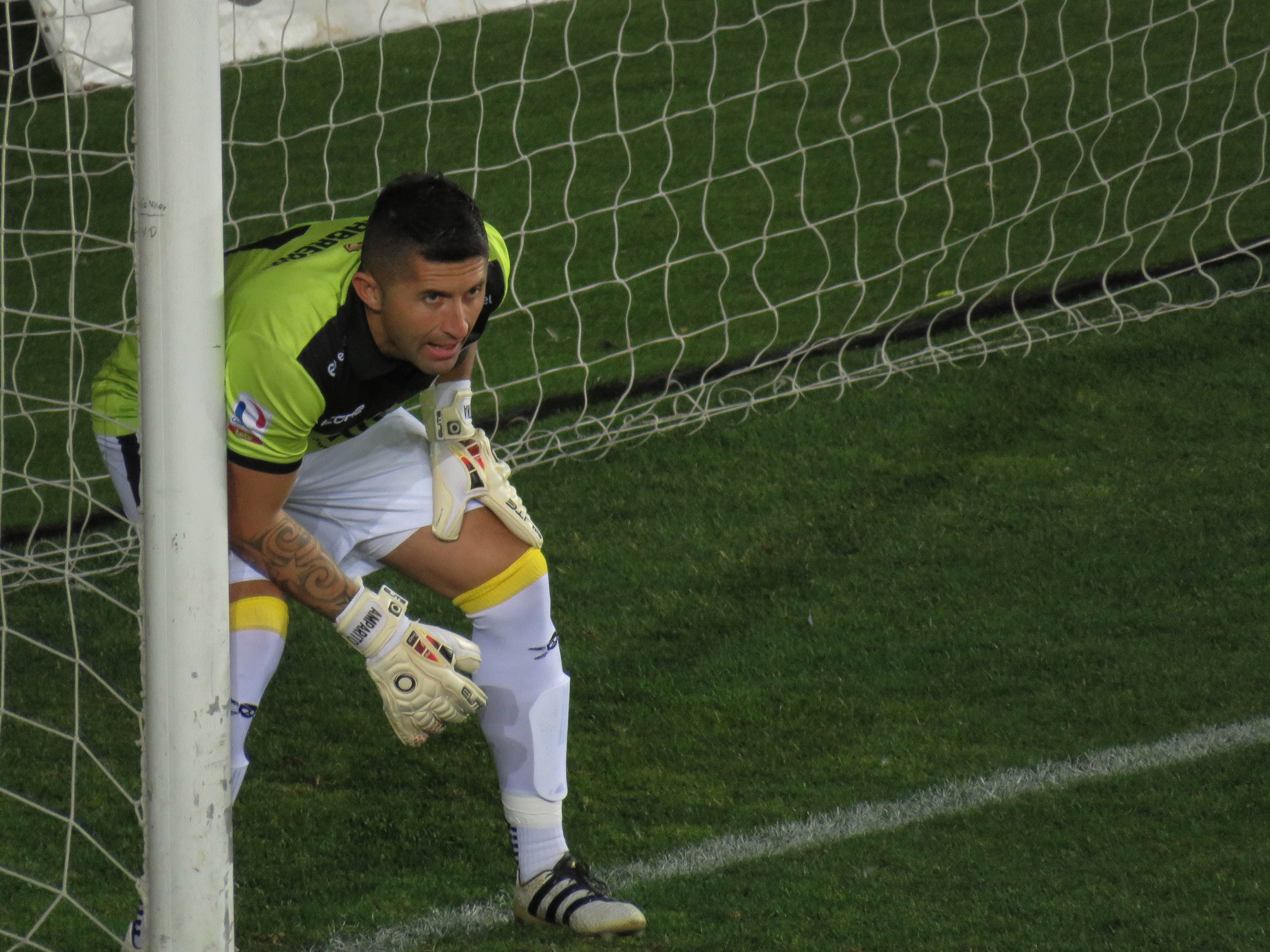
- Cabrera with Coquimbo Unido in 2017

Personal information
- Full name: Franco Ángelo Cabrera Torres
- Date of birth: 1 May 1983 (age 43)
- Place of birth: Santiago, Chile
- Height: 1.81 m (5 ft 11 in)
- Position: Goalkeeper

Youth career
- Unión Española
- Deportes Melipilla

Senior career*
Years	Team	Apps	(Gls)
2002–2008	Deportes Melipilla	130	(0)
2009–2011	Universidad de Concepción	34	(0)
2012	Unión San Felipe	0	(0)
2012	Unión San Felipe B	5	(0)
2013–2016	Iberia	99	(0)
2016–2017	Coquimbo Unido	29	(0)
2018	Ñublense	3	(0)
2019–2022	Santiago Morning	52	(0)
2022	Deportes Limache	11	(0)
2023	Deportes Recoleta	13	(0)
2024	San Antonio Unido	3	(0)
2024	MesoAmerica	–	(–)
2025	Concón National	6	(0)
Total		385	(0)
- * Club domestic league appearances and goals

Franco Ángelo Cabrera Torres (born 1 May 1983) is a Chilean former footballer who played as a goalkeeper.

== Club career ==
As a youth player, Cabrera was with Unión Española before joining the under-17 team of Deportes Melipilla, with whom he made his professional debut.

With an extensive career in the Chilean football, Cabrera played for clubs such as Universidad de Concepción, Coquimbo Unido, Santiago Morning, Deportes Recoleta, among others.

On 26 January 2024, Cabrera joined San Antonio Unido in the Segunda División Profesional de Chile. After playing three matches, he announced his retirement on 20 March of the same year, aged 40. However, he moved to the United States to play for MesoAmerica FC alongside his countryman Leonardo Espinoza.

In 2025, he returned to the football activity by joining Concón National in 2025, his last club.

== Honours ==
Deportes Melipilla

- Primera B (2): 2004, 2006

Universidad de Concepción

- Copa Chile (1): 2008–09
