= Mayra Goñi =

Peruvian actress and singer

Mayra
- Born: Mayra Alejandra Goñi Gastiaburu
- Origin: Lima, Peru
- Genres: Pop, Latin, Pop rock
- Occupations: Actress and singer
- Instrument: Vocals
- Label: Independent

Mayra Alejandra Goñi (better known as Mayra) is a Peruvian actress and singer. Yuru portrayed in the miniseries "Yuru: La princesa de la selva". In 2012 Goñi won the reality show "Operación Triunfo". In 2013 Goñi released her first album called "Parece Amor" which showed her first single called "Horas".

== Albums ==
- 2013: Parece Amor

== Singles ==
- 2013: Horas

== Singles ==
- 2020: Victima

== TV ==
- 2007: Yuru: La princesa amazónica. Yuru
- 2008: Magnolia Merino... Wendy Solis
- 2011: Eva. Rosa Ayllón
- 2012: La faraona... Marisol (adolescent)
- 2012–2013: Solamente Milagros
- 2013: Conversando Con La Luna
- 2014: La Mujer Boa
- 2020: Te volveré a encontrar
- 2026: Valentina valiente

== Realities ==
- 2012: Operación Triunfo... Winner

== Cine ==
- 2012: El Buen Pedro... Susan
- 2017: Av. Larco... La Prima
- 2023: Hablando huevadas: ¡Hijo de...!
