= Aldo Miyashiro =

Peruvian screenwriter & actor (born 1976)

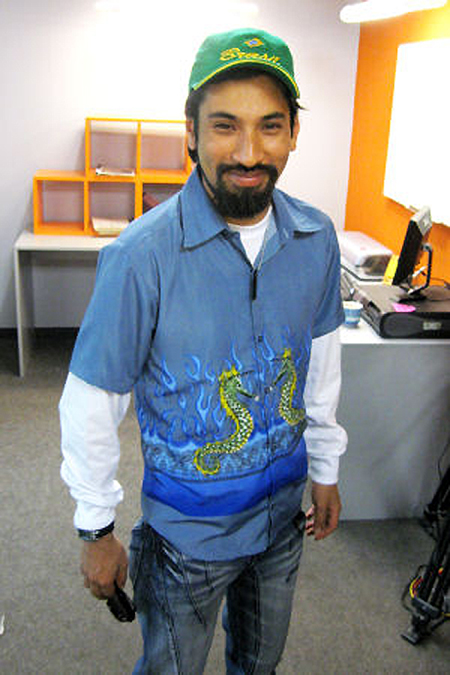
- Aldo Miyashiro in 2008
- Born: Aldo Marcos Miyashiro Ribeiro; February 9, 1976 (age 50); Lima, Peru
- Education: Pontifical Catholic University of Peru, National Superior School of Dramatic Art
- Occupations: Actor; playwright; presenter; producer; screenwriter
- Years active: 2003–present
- Children: 4

Aldo Marcos Miyashiro Ribeiro (born February 9, 1976) is a Peruvian actor, screenwriter, playwright, film director and presenter. Known mainly for his roles in the Misterio series and Tony Blades in the series La gran sangre, and also for leading his TV show La Banda del Chino. In addition, he is the director of the films Attacked: The Theory of Pain (2015), Bleed. Scream. Beat! (2017), & Wake Show (2020).

== Biography ==
Aldo Miyashiro was born on February 9, 1976 in Lima, Peru. He is of Peruvian and Japanese descent; studied at Colegio Champagnat (Lima). He was a student at the Pontifical Catholic University of Peru, after journalism at the Jaime Bausate y Meza School (where he began his theatrical activity) and acting at the ENSAD and the playwright's workshop Roberto Ángeles He is also a barrista for Club Universitario de Deportes.

In 2003, he premiered the play A mystery, a passion, which he brought to television in 2004 as the miniseries Misterio, where he performed to "Lock". The following year he starred in the miniseries Lobos de Mar.

In March 2005 he married the actress and singer Érika Villalobos, with whom they have two children.

His next television job as an actor and screenwriter was the series The Great Blood where he played Tony Blades. The series lasted four seasons (from 2006 to 2007) for Frecuencia Latina. In 2007 the miniseries film was released: The Great Blood: The Film. In 2008 he debuted as a presenter of the late show "Enemigos Íntimos" with Beto Ortiz by Frecuencia Latina. Two years later, the program moved to Panamericana Televisión under the name Enemigos Públicos.

At the Festival FIL-Lima 2009, his book A mystery, a passion was the best seller with approximately 1000 copies.

Along with his work as a presenter, he acted and wrote the script for two miniseries, he competed in the dance reality show El gran show, hosted by Gisela Valcárcel, where he obtained the fourth put after two months of competition.

He is currently working on the television program La Banda del Chino, directed by América Televisión.

== Television ==
=== Mini series ===
He acted and wrote the script for the following productions:

- Misterio (2005) as "Caradura" - Frecuencia Latina
- Lobos del mar (2005) as Tony Blades - Frecuencia Latina
- La gran sangre (2006-2007) as Tony Blades - Frecuencia Latina
- Golpe a golpe (2007) (guest role in the 1st episode) as Tony Blades - Frecuencia Latina.
- Chico de mi barrio (2010) as "Caradura" - Panamericana Televisión
- La fuerza (2011) as Mayor Zero - Panamericana Televisión.
- Señores Papis (2019) as Ignacio Moreno - América Televisión.
- Llauca (2021) as Jokker - Latina Televisión, GV Producciones and Movistar TV App
- Perdóname (2023) as Aquiles "Lito" Acosta - América Televisión.

=== Programs ===
- Enemigos íntimos (2008-2010), co-host with Beto Ortiz -
- Enemigos públicos (2010-2014), co-host initially with Beto Ortiz, then with Sandra Vergara, and finally with Mónica Cabrejos - Panamericana Televisión.
- El Gran Show season 1 (2011), participant "Hero" / 4th place - América Televisión.
- Malcriados (2011), producer - Panamericana Televisión.
- Todos los bravos (2012), producer - Panamericana Televisión.
- La batéria (January 19, 2015 - April 1, 2016), co-host with Viviana Rivasplata - Panamericana Televisión.
- La banda del Chino (2017-2024), host - América Televisión.
