= Johanna San Miguel =

Peruvian actress, presenter and comedian (born 1967)

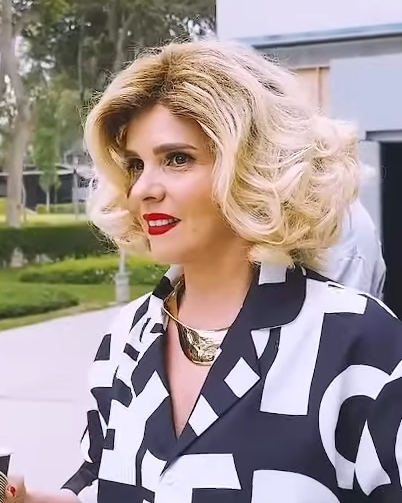
- Born: 14 November 1967 (age 58); Lima, Peru
- Occupations: TV Host, Actress, Comedian
- Known for: Carmín, Pataclaun, America espectaculos, Esto Es Guerra
- Children: 1

Johanna San Miguel (born 14 November 1967) is a Peruvian actress, presenter and comedian. Best known for being the host of the entertainment segment of "Primera Edición" morning news show. Her segment is called "America Espectáculos." and being in the teen soap opera "Carmín" and playing the fun and extroverted Queka in the popular show "Patacláun".

== Television ==
Her career in television started in 1984 with the teen soap "Carmín". In 1995, she participated in the popular soap "Los Unos y los Otros" (The Ones, and the Others), where she met the actor Carlos Carlin, who later became her partner in various successful theater projects. It was around this time that she became part of the cast of the comedy troupe "Patacláun" which had a TV show of the same name. That show was broadcast by Frecuencia Latina, where she and her character "Queca" became very popular. Four years later she did "Carita de Atún" (Tuna face, a mock reference to "Carita de Angel" or Angel face a popular kid soap opera) An avant garde show that parodied shmaltzy children's soap operas by infusing them with comedy and adding elements of theatre design in their sets.

== Radio ==
She co-hosted for a time along with Carlos Carlin, a radio show called "Yo te amo, yo tampoco." on Lima's Radio Planeta. Currently she's the host of radio a radio show called "Jamon, Jamon" in Lima's Studio92 radio.

== Theatre ==
Along with Carlos Carlin, she acted in successful plays like "Chancho Amor" (a play on the Spanish words: "tanto amor" but in this case meaning pig love) and "Puro Cuento" (a play on irreverent take on fairy tales with an adult and sexy twist).

Currently, Johanna, serves as host of the showbiz segment for the morning news program "Primera Edición" on America TV, in addition to conducting the radio program "Jamon, Jamon" on Lima's Studio92 radio.
