= Peruvian rock =

Music genre

Rock music emerged in Peru in the late 1950s, through listening to performers like Elvis Presley, Buddy Holly and Bill Haley, who popularized rockabilly in the United States. The first Peruvian rock bands appeared during this time. They included Los Millonarios del Jazz, Los Stars, Conjunto Astoria, Los Incas Modernos, and Los Zodiacs.

== History ==
=== 1960s ===
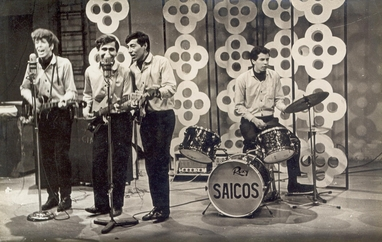
Los Saicos in 1965

New trends like British Merseybeat and American surf became popular, and a number of Peruvian bands built a loyal audience. Los Saicos blended psychedelic rock, garage rock and surf. Los Shains featured rock guitar hero Pico Ego-Aguirre (later in Pax). Traffic Sound, the first Peruvian supergroup, merged core players from Los Hang Ten's with other important musicians. Also popular were Los York's, Los Jaguars, Los Silvertons, Los Belkings and Los Doltons.

=== 1970s ===
After the military coup in October 1968, rock music was branded an alienating phenomenon by the government of General Juan Velasco Alvarado. There was a ban of concerts in key venues including a highly anticipated Carlos Santana concert in 1971. However, some AM radio stations continued to play rock music (such as Radio Miraflores, Radio 1160, and Radio Atalaya). Also, record companies continued to release LPs of rock bands (such as Led Zeppelin and Jimi Hendrix) in Peru. The movie Woodstock was shown in Lima every two or three years. Moreover, some bands left their mark, such as El Polen, Traffic Sound, Pax, We All Together, Telegraph Avenue, Black Sugar, Crossroads, Tripping Foxters, Red Amber (the first Peruvian progressive rock band), and Fragil (in the late 1970s). In the late 1970s, the band Breeze with Roxana Valdivieso released a self-titled album with English lyrics.

Peruvian rock descended into its most obscure era during the mid-1970s, losing the momentum it had laboriously gained. Disco and salsa dominated the airwaves for the remainder of the decade. Some rock musicians became jazz musicians, such as guitarist Richie Zellon.

=== 1980s ===
During the late 1970s and early 1980s, Peruvian rock bands were confined to the underground scene; with no radio or TV support. The half-hour TV show Disco Club led by singer-songwriter Gerardo Manuel (Rojas) was an occasional exception. Fragil released its first LP in 1981. Nevertheless, because of the deep crisis that the country was suffering, Peruvian rockers looked for a way to channel their frustrations. In this environment, it is no surprise that British punk rock became a major influence to a few young Peruvians rockers of this era, and quickly a small "underground" scene started brewing parallel to the free-again 'mainstream' scene. Bands like Leusemia, Narcosis, Autopsia, Guerrilla Urbana, Zcuela Crrada formed part of the first wave. The members of these bands were mostly from poor neighborhoods, but a few came from upper-class neighborhoods and had learned English in their schools.

Bands like Fragil, Rio, Miki Gonzales, Pax, JAS, Imagenes, Trama, Danai y Pateandolatas came from upper and middle-class backgrounds, uncovering the social division in Peruvian society. According to some scholars (mainly left-wing thinkers), the 'underground' scene was by far richer in creativity, though lacking technical skills; others thought the 'commercial' scene was more worthwhile, since the underground scene only reached a few hundred supporters per concert and was focused in the capital of Lima, being virtually unknown to the rest of the country.

Quickly several bands started appearing and creating subgenres within the umbrella 'underground' scene. Radio or TV support was nonexistent for them (the mainstream bands did have some), poverty and lack of technology prevented most bands from recording any moderate-quality material. Despite all this, the present and future looked much brighter than in the 1970s, since these bands, especially the mainstream ones, were pioneers in the rock scene after the 1975–1985 downturn.

At the same time, an underground scene of death metal and black metal developed in Lima, influenced by European bands. Local bands such as Mortem and Kranium were formed in the 1980s.

=== 1990s ===
The further growth of the underground scene and the liberalization of Peruvian society and economy allowed rock musicians to create sub-circuits, and rock became very diverse. Some of the best (but not necessarily best known) rock bands from Peru came out during this decade. Leusemia became the leaders of not only the 'underground' faction, but of all Peruvian rock, undergoing a change from very basic rock band to a prolific and influential group that included rock anthems, ballads and symphonic, almost progressive rock. For those who liked the 1980s post-punk, Dolores Delirio, Voz Propia and Cardenales were among the best at the goth sound.

Huelga De Hambre was one of Peru's grunge-influenced group. El Aire, G3, Arcana, Radio Criminal, Los Mojarras, Mar De Copas, La Liga del Sueño and Rafo Raez were very solid bands of diverse genres that were followed in the late 1990s by La Sarita, Ni Voz Ni Voto, Cementerio Club, D'Mente Comun and Líbido, greatly expanding rock music in Peru.

Due to financial difficulties and lack of support from promoters, most bands had to play the same few venues, where they build loyal and knowledgeable fanbases. Although the concerts were very small at the beginning (typically 50 people), as the decade progressed, more young people started to notice these bands and fill bigger venues with 500, 1000, or 2000 people. Towards the end of the decade, major concerts like "Acustirock", "El Niño Malo", "Antimiseria" and "Inrockuptibles" each brought in at least 10,000 fans.

Peruvian media began to pay attention to these bands in the late 1990s, giving exposure to bands of a decidedly more upper-class and 'safer' sounding rock. The most prominent bands of 'mainstream' 1990s Peruvian rock were Nosequien y Los Nosecuantos, Miki Gonzales and Arena Hash. From this last band, Pedro Suárez-Vértiz went on a solo career and became the most commercially successful Peruvian rocker of the decade, and is often considered the greatest Peruvian rocker in history.

The black metal and death metal scene remained an underground, with a few bands releasing self-produced material. Bands included black-metal acts Illapa, Belzec, and Nahual; and death-thrash metal acts like Dark Silence, Ensalve, and Hadez. Many conflicts between bands (which include trash-talking and rivalries) and critical political and economic issues led to the breakup of many metal groups.

A report on Peruvian rock included in the July 1999 issue of Maximum RocknRoll mentions the following bands: Aeropajitas, Manganzoides, 60s garage punk/garage revival, Asmereir, a blend of punk/ska/reggae/hardcore/thrash, Leusemia, that put out a double CD through Coyote Records titled Moxon, Histeria Kolectiva reminiscing of Leusemia, dios hastío euro-crustcore intense and desperate, Ataque Frontal classic I-spit-on-your-face band, one of the shapers of the scene, Psicosis ska/punk orchestra, 3 Al Hilo, punk rock and roll, Metadona female-fronted pop-punk, Magras punk/hardcore and reggae, P. T. K. this means Pateando Tu Kara, Sudor de Huevos (SDH)-punk, Los Rezios, Autonomia, Migraña, Irreverentes, Hazloquechuchapunkron, Perú No Existe, Generacion Perdida. It also mentioned fanzines: Caleta, Sub, Cuero Negro and Crash Boom Zap.

=== 2000s ===
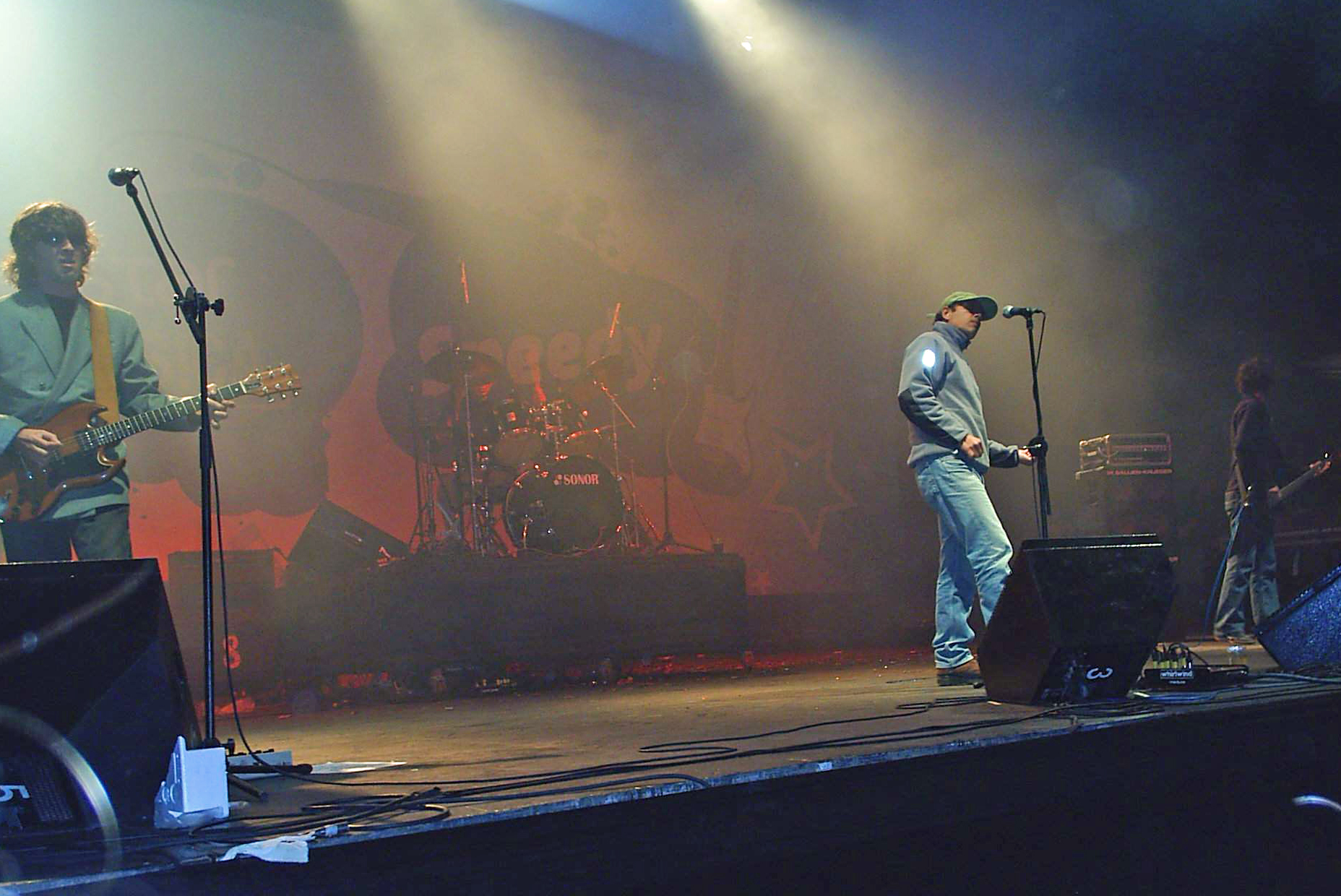
Mar de Copas performing in 2007

A mature and prolific rock scene soon gained exposure due to the improved economic presence of Peru in the region. Peruvian TV and the Latin American division of MTV took notice of Peruvian bands, and included them in their shows ahead of the Peruvian mainstream radio. Peruvian rock videos were in normal rotation alongside regionally known acts like Soda Stereo, Shakira and Jaguares.

Líbido became Peru's most successful band, selling hundreds of thousands of discs worldwide and receiving Grammy nominations and several Latin MTV awards. Soon other bands like Amen, Zen and TK found success. Aliados and Inyectores (both made up of ex-G3 members), Los Fuckin Sombreros, Campo De Almas, Pelo Madueño (drummer of the 1980s Peruvian rock band Narcosis and leader, vocalist and guitarist of the 1990s Peruvian rock band La Liga Del Sueño), 6 Voltios, Space bee, Zaraúz, Brinvonda, Turbopotamos, Vaselina, Leusemia, Pancho Pepe Jazz Band, Los Claxon, the Peruvian melodic punk band Dalevuelta, Tráfico, Uchpa which is a rock & blues band in Quechua, Jose Arbulú (the vocalist and lead guitar of Cementerio Club), and Area 7 (an exponent of Peruvian Nu-Metal and the country's only all-female metal band), were acts that developed at the local level. Peruvian electronic music has its representatives in bands like Theremyn 4, Unidad central, Deimos, Insumision, Ensamble, Vacuna tu hijo, Kollantes.

Dozens of new bands kept coming out and most of the 1990s bands were still playing and improving their recordings. The albums of the early rock banks, including Los Saicos, Traffic Sound, and We All Together were released on CDs. Radio stations became more receptive of mainstream Peruvian Rock, given its recent commercial success. Most of the Peruvian media continues to not promote popular underground acts such as punk and reggae.

=== 2010s ===
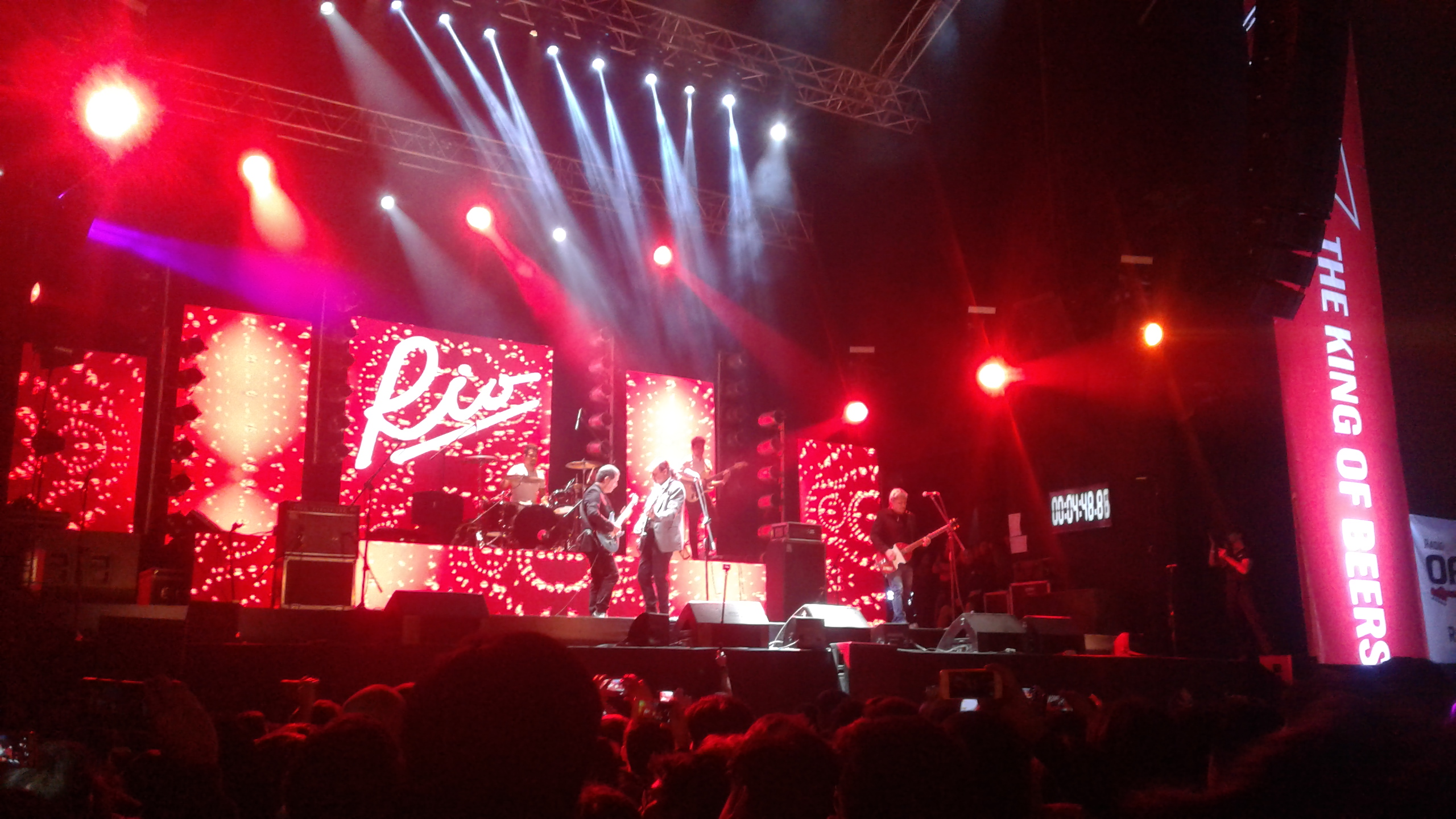
Grupo Rio in concert, 2018.

During the 2010s, many groups have emerged in the larger cities of Peru, especially in Lima. The growing world scene of psychedelic rock had led to the psychedelic sound being mixed with other genres, influencing Peruvian bands Cholo Visceral (blending with prog rock), Los Silver Mornings (vintage rock), Spatial Moods (blues), Onerom (jazz), and The Dead End-Alley Band and El Jefazo (stoner rock). In some Internet articles it is called "Nueva Psicodelia Latinoamericana" as a way to differentiate it from other kinds of psychedelic rock music that have emerged in Latinamerica during the 1970s, 1980s or 1990s.

== List of bands and solo performers ==
- Frágil
- Amen
- 6 Voltios
- Mar de Copas
- Crimson Death
- Dalevuelta
- Los Dickens
- Theremyn 4
- A.M.A.X.A
- (1957) Los Millonarios del Jazz
- (1958) Eulogio Molina y sus Rockanrollers
- (1959) Jorge Botteri
- (1962) Los Kreps
- (1962) Los Incas Modernos
- (1963) Los Sunset
- (1963) Los Golden Boys
- (1964) Los Zodiacs
- (1964) Los Saicos
- (1964) Los Shains
- (1965) Los Termits
- (1965) Los Doltons
- (1965) Los Drags
- (1965) Los Steivos
- (1965) Los Fannings
- (1965) Los Teddys
- (1965) Los VIPs
- (1965) Los Belkings
- (1966) Los Spectros
- (1966) Los Golden Stars
- (1966) Los York's
- (1966) Los Silverstons
- (1967) Los Holys
- (1967) Los Zanys
- (1967) Traffic Sounds
- (1968) The Mad's
- (1968) Los Comandos
- (1969) El Opio
- (1969) Los Far Fen
- (1969) The (St Thomas) Pepper Smelter
- (1969) Telegraph Avenue
- (1969) PAX
- (1970) Black Sugar
- (1970) Grupo Amigos
- (1970) Gerardo Manuel & El Humo
- (1971) El Alamo
- (1971) Smog
- (1971) Cacique
- (1971) We All Together
- (1972) El Ayllu
- (1972) El Polen
- (1972) Tarkus
- (1974) Red Amber
- (1976) Frágil
- (1982) Autocontrol
- (1983) Rio
- (1983) Leuzemia
- (1984) Feiser
- (1984) Narcosis
- (1985) M.A.S.A.C.R.E.
- (1986) Arena Hash
- (1986) Miki Gonzáles
- (1986) G-3
- (1986) Salón Dadá
- (1986) XDinero
- (1987) Trama
- (1987) Orgus
- (1988) No se quién y no se cuántos
- (1991) UCHPA
- (1991) La Liga del Sueño
- (1992) Mar de Copas
- (1993) Los Zopilotes
- (1993) Pedro Suárez-Vértiz
- (1994) Campo de Almas
- (1994) Dolores Delirio
- (1994) Ni Voz Ni Voto
- (1994) Huelga de Hambre
- (1995) Amen
- (1996) Madre Matilda
- (1995) Trémolo
- (1996) Deimos
- (1996) El Aire
- (1996) Libido
- (1996) Arcana
- (1996) Cementerio Club
- (1998) Semillas
- (1998) Dalevuelta
- (2000) Chaska
- (2000) Inyectores
- (2001) TK
- (2001) Chabelos
- (2001) Gaia
- (2002) La Negra
- (2002) Fuera del Resto
- (2002) ZEN
- (2003) Wayo
- (2003) Goat Semen
- (2004) Pamela Rodriguez
- (2005) YAWARHIEM
- (2005) Dos Vírgenes
- (2005) Emergency Blanket
- (2007) Alerta Rocket
- (2007) Los Silver Mornings
- (2007) Diego Dibós
- (2007) Grisho
- (2008) Pelo Madueño
- (2008) Autobus
- (2009) Jhovan
- (2010) Zhoria
- (2010) Difonía
- (2010) Los Luna
- (2010) Kanaku y El Tigre
- (2010) Los Casablanca
- (2011) Alejandro y Maria Laura
- (2011) Cholo Visceral
- (2011) Francois Peglau
- (2012) Gris Volta
- (2012) Spatial Moods
- (2012) Tourista (rock)
- (2013) Danitse
- (2013) Puto Man Insecto
- (2014) La Lá
- (2014) Almirante Ackbar
- (2014) Mundaka
- (2015) Los Lagartos
- (2015) Serto Mercurio
- (2015) Fabricio Robles
- (2015) Astronaut Project
- (2015) Banana Child
- (2015) Manuel Vera Tudela Wither
- (2016) El Cuarto de Juegos
- (2016) Bricheros
- (2016) Golden Cameleon
- (2017) Inzul
- (2017) Santa García
- (2017) Mecánica del Caos
- (2018) Lorena Blume
- (2019) Putzy

== See also ==
- Music of Peru
- Peruvian metal
