= Av. Larco =

Av. Larco, la película
- Theatrical release poster
- Directed by: Jorge Carmona
- Written by: Javier Fuentes León
- Based on: Av. Larco: El Musical by Rasec Barragán & Giovanni Ciccia
- Produced by: Miguel Valladares; Jorge Carmona
- Starring: Juan Carlos Rey de Castro; Nicolás Galindo; André Silva
- Cinematography: Patricio Fuster
- Edited by: Eric Williams
- Music by: Veronica Perez Orbezo
- Production company: Tondero Producciones
- Distributed by: Tondero Producciones
- Release date: 30 March 2017
- Running time: 90 minutes
- Country: Peru
- Language: Spanish

Av. Larco (also known as Av. Larco, la película) is a 2017 Peruvian jukebox musical comedy-drama film directed by Jorge Carmona. It is based on Av. Larco: El musical by Rasec Barragán & Giovanni Ciccia, which in turn is inspired by the song «Avenida Larco» by the Peruvian rock group "Frágil".

== Synopsis ==
Four school friends form a music band and dream of being famous. They play rock, a genre that at the end of the 1980s was in full swing due to the Peruvian social conflicts and the rise of the terrorism in the country. Astalculo, the band, participates in a contest whose final prize is to play in a concert in the Plaza de Acho, but first they must play in popular stages that will make them see the reality of the country in which they live. The competition forces them to get out of their privilege, see the other side of the city and face the problems of their country in conflict.

== Cast ==
- Juan Carlos Rey de Castro as Andrés Dulude
- André Silva as Pedro
- Nicolas Galindo as Javier
- Carolina Cano as Marite
- Daniela Camaiora as Lola
- María Grazia Gamarra as Susana
- Mayra Goñi as Rebeca
- Andres Salas
- Javier Valdés as father of Andrés
- Katia Condos as Andrés's mother
- Emanuel Soriano as Rebeca's brother
- Carlos Galiano

=== Special Participations ===
- Bruno Odar
- Erika Villalobos

== Awards ==
Year	Award	Category	Recipient	Result	Ref.
2017	Premios Luces by El Comercio	Best Supporting Actor	André Silva	Won	
2017	Premios Luces by El Comercio	Best Supporting Actor	Nicolás Galindo	Nominated	

== Production ==
The film is shot in seven weeks in various locations in the city of Lima. It premiered on Thursday, 30 March 2017, and two weeks later it exceeded half a million viewers.

== Soundtrack ==
Various artists from the Peruvian rock scene participated in cameos for the songs, such as Andrés Dulude and Tavo Castillo from Frágil, Daniel F from Leusemia, Manolo Barrios from Mar de Copas, Marcello Motta from Amen, Julio Pérez from La Sarita, among others.

=== Songs list ===
The songs that appear in the film are the following:

- «Al colegio no voy más» (Leusemia)
- «La universidad» (Rio)
- «Mayoría equivocada» (Autopsia)
- «Sucio policía» (Narcosis)
- «Avenida Larco» (Frágil)
- «Contéstame» (Rio)
- «Y es que sucede así» (Arena Hash)
- «Lo peor de todo» (Rio)
- «Decir adiós» (Amén)
- «Triciclo Perú» (Los Mojarras)
- «Demolición» (Los Saicos, Leusemia)
- «Suna» (Mar de Copas)
- «Más poder» (La Sarita)
- «Nostalgia provinciana» (Los Mojarras)
- «Lola» (Miki González)
- «Las torres» (Nosequien y Los Nosecuantos)
- «Astalculo» (Leuzemia)
- «Inmortales» (Cementerio Club)
- «Magdalena» (Nosequién y Los Nosecuántos)
- «Por tu amor» (Autocontrol)
- «Mujer noche» (Mar de Copas) (unreleased video)
