= Mojarra (disambiguation) =

Mojarra is a family, Gerreidae, of fish in the order Perciformes.

Mojarra may refer to:

- Mojarra, the reference implementation of Jakarta Faces (JSF; formerly Jakarta Server Faces and JavaServer Faces)
- La Mojarra, a place in Mexico
- Las Mojarras, a place in Argentina
- Los Mojarras, a Peruvian band
