= Rio (band) =

Peruvian band

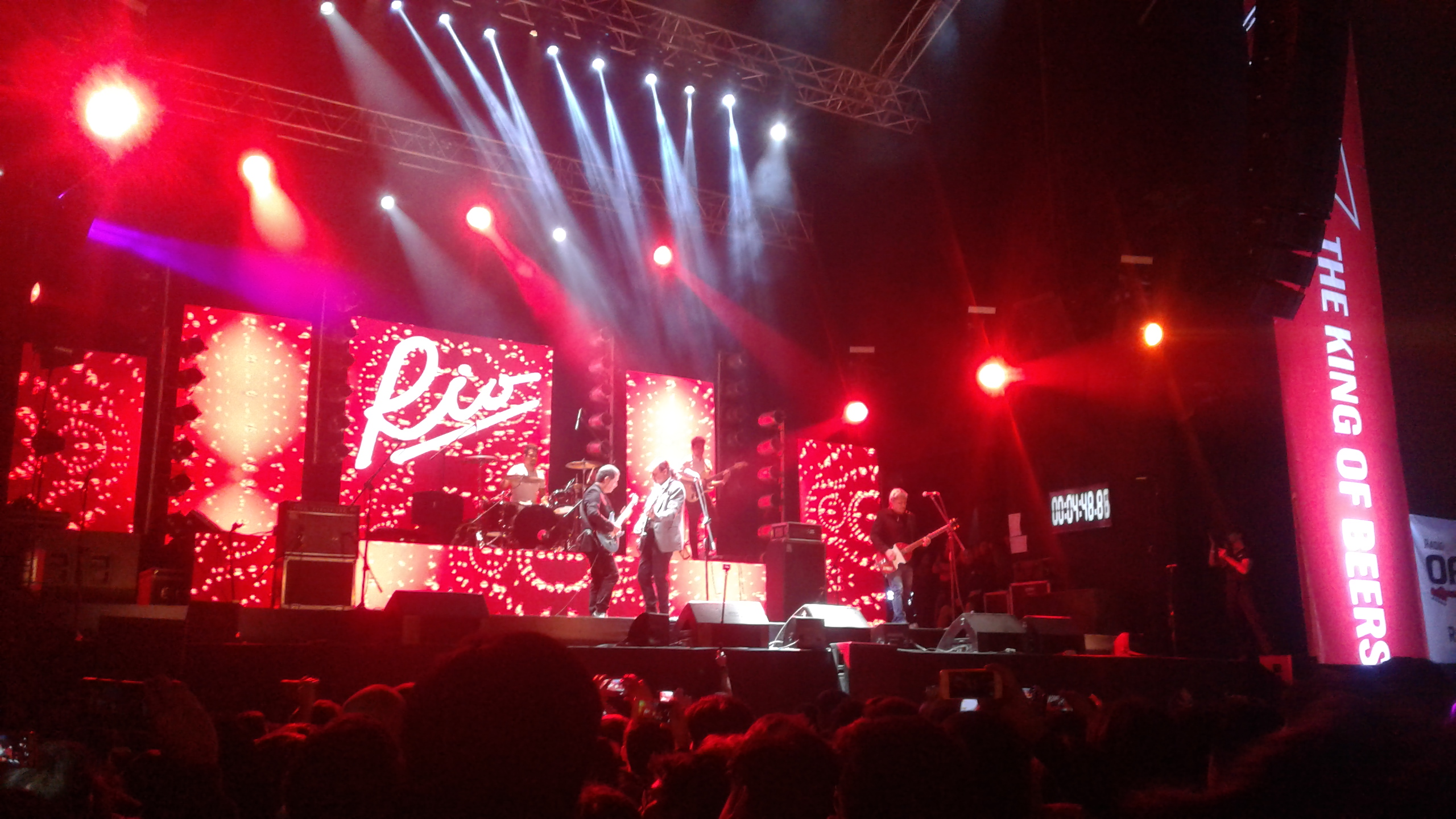
- Grupo Rio in concert, 2018

Background information
- Origin: Pueblo Libre, Lima, Perú
- Genres: New wave Pop rock
- Years active: 1984–present
- Members: Pocho Prieto; Lucio Galarza; José Galarza; Dani Castellanos; André Burgos; Juan Carlos Fernández
- Website: rio.com.pe

Rio (pronounced as Rió and not popularly as Río; stylized as RIO) is a Peruvian new wave and rock band formed in Pueblo Libre, Lima, in the 1980s and has almost 40 years of uninterrupted career. It is composed of Pocho Prieto (vocals and guitars), Cucho Galarza (bass), Chachi Galarza (guitar), the historical members, also Fred Aching (drums) and Juan Carlos Fernández (keyboards).

== History ==
The band was formed in early 1984 in the district of Pueblo Libre, Lima. Founders Arturo "Pocho" Prieto and brothers José "Chachi" and Lucio "Cucho" Galarza named the group Royal International Orchest, abbreviated as RIO. In this early stage, the group covered English songs.

In 1984, they began to write their own songs in Spanish and released Son Colegialas through the record label El Virrey. Their first release was not very successful due to problems with the publishing house. Nevertheless, they opened doors in the Cono Norte, where they began to give concerts. The following year, the group released "Televidente", recorded at Elías Ponce's studio, not at "El Virrey," and added Coco Tafur on keyboards. With this song, Rio's popularity grew to the point that they were hired for various gigs in Lima and even in the provinces.

After many tours, they released their third single, "La Universidad (cosa de locos)." The promotion of the band was greatly helped by the edition of videos that circulated in some musical programs at that time. In 1986, the group released their first album titled Lo Peor de Todo, presented at concerts in countries like Chile (including the show Sábado Gigante), Mexico, and Bolivia.

In 1988, they released their second album Dónde vamos a parar (1988), with songs like "Todo Estaba Bien," "Lo Empiezo a Odiar," and "Contéstame." This LP took Rio on tour across many countries in Latin America.

Their third production, Revolución, recorded and mixed in Santiago in November and December 1989 and released in January 1990 only in cassette format, did not achieve the success of its predecessors and went almost unnoticed. This album included songs like "Pierdo la Razón" and "Mónica."

A couple of years later, in 1992, Rio released their fourth album: Strip Tease, released in Chile and Bolivia. This album included songs like "Al Norte de América" or "Tienes que Pagarme Más," along with "Dulce y amargo" and "Tarará," which were promoted during the first half of 1989 but were not included in their previous album.

Two years later, they released their fifth album: Rock and Qué?, featuring songs like "Carol Quiere un Viaje a Londres" or "No Me cabe Duda."

Rio's subsequent albums were Relax (1996), Día de pesca (1997), and La cría in 1999. After this album, Rio took a break before releasing what would be their ninth album, Boomerang (2003), featuring songs like "Bella Luna," "Traicionera," and "Moriría por Ti.".

In 2004, they performed for the Peruvian community in Spain, in 2006 in New Jersey, and in 2007 in Los Angeles. Since then, they have continuously toured the United States and Europe.

In 2005, the group recorded the version "Por tu amor" by vernacular singer Sonia Morales, who also performed. That year, their album 20 años was released, featuring the band's successes from 1986 to 2006.

A concert was held in February 2015 to celebrate the band's 30th anniversary. The show lasted approximately 12 hours and featured performances by various Peruvian bands, including Libido, Mar de Copas, Amén, Raúl Romero, Zen, Cementerio Club, Los Mojarras, and others. On May 23, they participated in the largest festival in the history of Peruvian rock, the VIVO X EL ROCK 5 Festival, held at the Estadio Nacional in Lima. ]

In July 2017, on the occasion of the Peruvian national holidays celebrated in Japan, the Lima trio performed at Studio Coast in Tokyo before a packed auditorium of mainly Peruvian fans, who were accompanied by local professional musicians, who complemented them to masterfully perform their memorable 80s songs.

In November 2018, Rio announced a new studio album called 33 along with the "Presentación de 33" concert, which took place on November 24 at the Concha Acústica del Campo de Marte in Jesús María.

== Members ==
Current

- Pocho Prieto – vocals, guitar
- Lucio Galarza – bass
- José Galarza – guitar

Current touring

- Dani Castellanos – drums
- André Burgos – guitar
- Juan Carlos Fernández – keyboards

Former

- Eduardo Tafur – keyboards
- Kike Figueroa – drums
- Armando Pattroni – drums
- Isidoro Saldaña – drums
- Walter Fernández – drums
- Freddy Neira – keyboards

== Discography ==
=== Albums ===
- Lo Peor de Todo (1986)
- Dónde vamos a parar (1988)
- Revolución (1990)
- Strip Tease (1992)
- Rock and Qué? (1994)
- Relax (1996)
- Día de pesca (1997)
- La cría (1999)
- Boomerang (2003)
- Río en vivo (2006)
- Lo peor de todo – Grandes Éxitos (2008)
- Duetos & más (2009)

=== Singles ===
- "Son colegialas" (1984
- "Televidente" (1985)
- "La Universidad (cosa de locos)" (1986)
- "Lo Peor de Todo" (1987)
- "Contéstame" (1988)
- "Todo estaba bien" (1988)
- "Lo empiezo a odiar" (1988)
- "Al norte de América" (1991)
- "Carol quiere un viaje a Londres" (1993)
- "Eres mi Princesa" (2011)
- "Tributo a los independientes" (2017)
- "Amores que acaban" (2018
- "¡Vamos a volver!" (2020)
- "Tu y Yo" (2023)
- "Te Espero" (2024)

== See also ==
- Peruvian rock
- Rock music
