= Because What You Want & What You Get Are Two Completely Different Things Tour =

2025 concert tour by Guns N' Roses

- Tour by Guns N' Roses
- Poster with the concerts from May to July
- Location: Asia; Europe; North America; South America
- Start date: May 1, 2025
- End date: November 8, 2025
- Legs: 2
- No. of shows: 44
- Supporting acts: Rival Sons; Public Enemy; Sex Pistols; Girish and the Chronicles; Wolfmother; Catupecu Machu; Raimundos; Amen
- Attendance: 1.31 million (41 shows)
- Box office: $144.3 million (41 shows)

Guns N' Roses concert chronology
- 2023 Tour (2023); Because What You Want & What You Get Are Two Completely Different Things Tour (2025); 2026 Tour (2026)

The Because What You Want & What You Get Are Two Completely Different Things Tour was a concert tour by the American hard rock band Guns N' Roses. It began on May 1, 2025, in Incheon, South Korea, and concluded on November 8, 2025, in Mexico City, Mexico.

It was the first tour with the band's new drummer Isaac Carpenter following the departure of longtime drummer Frank Ferrer, who left Guns N' Roses on March 19, 2025.

The tour has grossed $144.3 million from 41 shows and was attended by more than 1.31 million people, making it one of the highest grossing and most attended tours of 2025.

== Set list ==
The following set list is taken from the concert held on 1 May 2025, in Incheon. It may not represent all concerts for the duration of the tour.

1. "Welcome to the Jungle"
2. "Bad Obsession"
3. "Mr. Brownstone"
4. "Chinese Democracy"
5. "Live and Let Die" (Wings cover)
6. "Slither" (Velvet Revolver cover)
7. "Perhaps"
8. "Estranged"
9. "Double Talkin' Jive"
10. "Coma"
11. "Sorry"
12. "Better"
13. "Knockin' on Heaven's Door" (Bob Dylan cover)
14. "It's So Easy"
15. "Rocket Queen"
16. Slash guitar solo
17. "Sweet Child o' Mine"
18. "November Rain"
19. "Wichita Lineman" (Jimmy Webb cover)
20. "Patience"
21. "Nightrain"
22. "Paradise City"

== Tour dates ==
List of 2025 concerts, showing date, city, country, venue, opening act, tickets sold, number of available tickets, and amount of gross revenue
Date (2025)	City	Country	Venue	Opening act	Attendance	Revenue
May 1	Incheon	South Korea	Songdo Moonlight Park	—N/a	—	—
May 5	Yokohama	Japan	K-Arena	—N/a	19,000 / 19,000	$1,975,192
May 10	Taoyuan	Taiwan	Taoyuan Sunlight Arena	—N/a	—	—
May 13	Bangkok	Thailand	Thunderdome Stadium	—N/a	—	—
May 17	Mumbai	India	Mahalaxmi Racecourse	Girish and the Chronicles	—	—
May 20	Sakhir	Bahrain	Al-Dana Amphitheatre	Winterburn	—	—
May 23	Riyadh	Saudi Arabia	Mohammed Abdo Arena	Gimmix	—	—
May 27	Abu Dhabi	United Arab Emirates	Etihad Arena	—N/a	—	—
May 30	Shekvetili	Georgia	Shekvetili Park	Rival Sons	—	—
June 2	Istanbul	Turkey	Tüpraş Stadyumu	Rival Sons	—	—
June 6	Coimbra	Portugal	Estádio Cidade de Coimbra	Rival Sons	—	—
June 9	Barcelona	Spain	Estadi Olímpic Lluís Companys	Rival Sons	—	—
June 12 (Note: The performance in Florence on June 12, 2025, was part of Firenze Rocks.)	Florence	Italy	Ippodromo del Visarno	Rival Sons	—N/a	—N/a
June 15 (Note: The performance in Hradec Králové on June 15, 2025, was part of Rock for People.)	Hradec Králové	Czech Republic	Park 360	Rival Sons	—N/a	—N/a
June 18	Düsseldorf	Germany	Merkur Spiel-Arena	Rival Sons	38,560 / 38,560	$4,788,071
June 20	Munich	Germany	Allianz Arena	Rival Sons	—	—
June 23	Birmingham	England	Villa Park	Rival Sons	33,568 / 33,568	$4,515,177
June 26	London	England	Wembley Stadium	Rival Sons	53,015 / 53,015	$7,965,258
June 29	Aarhus	Denmark	Eskelunden	Public Enemy	—	—
July 2	Trondheim	Norway	Dahls Arena	Public Enemy	—	—
July 4	Stockholm	Sweden	Strawberry Arena	Public Enemy	—	—
July 7	Tampere	Finland	Tampere Stadium	Public Enemy	—	—
July 10	Kaunas	Lithuania	Darius and Girėnas Stadium	Public Enemy	—	—
July 12	Warsaw	Poland	PGE Narodowy	Public Enemy	—	—
July 15	Budapest	Hungary	Puskás Aréna	Public Enemy	43,176 / 43,176	$3,780,451
July 18	Belgrade	Serbia	Ušće Park	Public Enemy	—	—
July 21	Sofia	Bulgaria	Vasil Levski National Stadium	Public Enemy	41,090 / 41,090	$5,682,351
July 24	Vienna	Austria	Ernst-Happel-Stadion	Wolfmother; Sex Pistols	42,589 / 42,589	$4,246,342
July 28 (Note: The performance in Luxembourg on July 28, 2025, was part of the Luxexpo Open Air series of concerts.)	Luxembourg	Luxembourg	Luxexpo The Box	Sex Pistols	—	—
July 31 (Note: The performance in Hauptstrasse on July 31, 2025, was part of Wacken Open Air.)	Wacken	Germany	Hauptstrasse	—N/a	—N/a	—N/a
October 1	San José	Costa Rica	Estadio Nacional	Slavon; Gëntry	—	—
October 4	San Salvador	El Salvador	Estadio Jorge "El Mágico" González (Note: The performance in San Salvador on October 4, 2025, was originally scheduled at Estadio Cuscatlán, but holding a concert days before the World Cup qualifying matches would damage the field.)	Ran42k	—	—
October 7	Bogotá	Colombia	Vive Claro	1280 Almas	—	—
October 11	Medellín	Colombia	Estadio Atanasio Girardot	Bajo Tierra	—	—
October 14	Santiago	Chile	Parque Estadio Nacional	La Mala Senda	—	—
October 17	Buenos Aires	Argentina	Estadio Tomás Adolfo Ducó	Catupecu Machu	—	—
October 18	Buenos Aires	Argentina	Estadio Tomás Adolfo Ducó	Catupecu Machu	—	—
October 21	Florianópolis	Brazil	Arena Opus	Raimundos	—	—
October 25	São Paulo	Brazil	Allianz Parque	Raimundos	—	—
October 28	Curitiba	Brazil	Pedreira Paulo Leminski	Raimundos	—	—
October 31	Cuiabá	Brazil	Arena Pantanal	Raimundos	—	—
November 2	Brasília	Brazil	Arena BRB Mané Garrincha	Raimundos	—	—
November 5	Lima	Peru	Estadio Nacional	Amen	—	—
November 8	Mexico City	Mexico	Estadio GNP Seguros	Public Enemy	—	—
Total					—N/a	—N/a

== Personnel ==
- Axl Rose – lead vocals, piano, percussion
- Slash – lead guitar, rhythm guitar, talkbox, slide guitar
- Duff McKagan – bass, backing vocals, lead vocals
- Dizzy Reed – keyboards, piano, percussion, backing vocals
- Richard Fortus – rhythm guitar, lead guitar, backing vocals
- Melissa Reese – keyboards, synthesizers, sub-bass, programming, percussion, backing vocals
- Isaac Carpenter – drums, percussion
