= Demolición =

Single by Los Saicos

from the album Wild Teen-Punk from Peru 1965
- B-side: "Lonely Star"
- Released: May of 1965
- Recorded: 1964; Lima, Peru
- Genre: Garage rock; proto-punk; surf rock
- Length: 2:54
- Label: Dis-Perú
- Songwriter: Erwin Flores

Los Saicos singles chronology
"Come On" (1964)	"Demolición" (1965)	"Camisa de fuerza" (1965)

Music video
- "Demolición'" on YouTube

Demolición (in English: "Demolition") is a song by the Peruvian rock band Los Saicos. It was the second promotional single and quickly became a success in their country.

== Promotion ==
Released as a single, "Demolition" became one of the most popular songs of Peruvian rock at the time. The song is an anthem of the group. The song is based on a catchy melody, with disorder and a rhythm very typical of punk music.

== Style and composition ==
The song was composed by the band's vocalist, Erwin Flores, during a rehearsal in 1964. It begins with the hummed cries of Flores: "ta-ta-ta-ta-ta-ta-ta-ta-ya-ya-ya" and its lyrics are anarchic: "Echemos abajo la estación de tren / Echemos abajo la estación de tren / Demoler, Demoler, Demoler / Demoler, demoler la estación de tren" (Let's destroy the train station / Let's destroy the train station / Demolish, demolish, demolish / Demolish, demolish the train station). In spite of the period Peru was going through, the lyrics lack any political content. Its lyrics imply that train stations must be deliberately demolished and destroyed as an act of complete rebellion.

The melody is repetitive and composed of four stanzas. Its harmonic structure comprises three simple major chords: A, D, and E.

The instrumentation is influenced by the surf rock of Dick Dale (which was very popular at the time) and its duration is only 2:53.

In 1965, the song was recorded by the label Dis-Perú in Peru and was published the same year. It was re-released by Electro-Harmonix some years later.

== Legacy ==
- This song was used in a British commercial for a brand of cat food, called Temptations.
- The song plays during the end credits of the anthology horror-comedy film Satanic Hispanics.

== See also ==
- Latino punk
- Garage rock
- Latin rock
