= Los Yorks =

Peruvian garage rock band

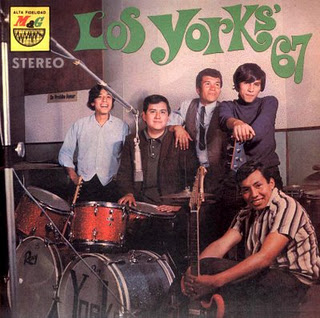
- Los Yorks in 1967

Background information
- Origin: Lima, Peru
- Genres: Garage rock, psychedelic rock, beat
- Years active: 1966–1969; 1971–1974
- Labels: El Virrey, MAG, Munster Records
- Past members: Pablo Luna; Roman Palacios; Walter Paz; Jesus Vilchez; Pacho Aguilar
- Website: www.myspace.com/losyorks

Los Yorks were a Peruvian garage rock band from Lima, active in the 1960s. Despite their relatively short career, the band was one of the most successful groups in their native country during the era. They were the first Peruvian band to have their own radio and television program, and made numerous media appearances throughout their career. They wrote many of their own songs in Spanish and had a visceral style, with vocalist Pablo Luna noted for moving frenetically during performances. The band's most famous single, "Abrazame", is sometimes seen as a benchmark song in Peruvian garage. Their music has become popular in the garage rock revival in recent years.

== History ==
=== Origins ===
The band came from the Rímac district of Lima, Peru. In 1964, guitarist, Roman Palacios met drummer, Fred Aguilar, and conceived the idea of forming a band. They named the band after New York City, to honor its musical influence. Subsequently, Walter Paz joined the group on guitar. They then went on to audition vocalists. One morning at the Tauro Theater, Palacios and Aguilar saw Pablo Luna sing for a media reception. His electrifying performance drew their attention, so, they invited him to rehearse with them. The band, who were all fans of "Los Saicos", played a few songs that well-known group. Luna joined the lineup.

=== Success ===
The band's first single, "Abrazame," was released on the MAG label in March 1967 and sold over 40,000 copies, an unusual case for that label. Later, for a brief period, Pablo Luna would not participate in the recordings. During this time, he was replaced by Enrique Palacios. The Yorks released their first LP, "Yorks' 67" on MAG. During the recording of this album, Miguel Quiroz played in place of Walter Paz. This is the album which catapulted them to national fame. The stations of the time programmed their songs allow them to be even better known in Lima and provinces. Songs such as "Abrazame", "Vete al infierno," among others, received the Golden Disk. They would share the stage with other contemporary bands such as "The Doltons", "The Shains" among others. For the recording of this album, Fernando Quiroz participated in place of Walter Paz. Fernando participated in most of the songs and the second guitar of other songs. Because of their newfound fame, they came to have their own TV and radio program, called "El show de Los York's" on channel 11. In 1968 they released their second LP, "York's 68," which consolidated their place in the national rock scene.

The additional fame allowed their label to offer more time and budgetary resources for the next LP, Yorks' 68. Some recorded tracks on the album featured the voice of Pablo Villanueva (better known in Peru as "Melcochita" tropical comedian and musician), who had played certain instruments and participated in some of the backing vocals and harmonies on the first LP. Despite the success of their records, the band did not enjoy an easy relationship with the MAG label. After a quarrel with the label's executives, they made arrangements to switch over to the El Virrey label. Unfortunately, MAG was not willing to dispense with Los Yorks, so they would have to finish out their contract first. The last album they would release on MAG was titled Yorks' 69, was a hodgepodge affair, hastily assembled by MAG, which the band regarded as an illegitimate and apocryphal release. Their next album, Rhythm and Feeling, appeared on El Virrey.

The Yorks finished mixing and editing their last LP, "York's, Rhythm and Feeling" which featured songs the songs "I Love You", "Easy Baby", "Suzie Q," among others. In the production of this album, they chose a dozen songs ranging from traditional to new wave of protest. In March 1971, just when the band enjoyed great popularity, pressure from the military government of Juan Velasco Alvarado began to criticize the style of the band "immoral" and "inciting". In 1974, the band broke up.

== Discography ==
=== Singles ===
- "Abrazame" (Palacios-Aguilar) (MAG, 1967)
- "Vete al infierno" (Palacios-Aguilar) (MAG, 1967)

=== Albums ===
- Los York's 67 (MAG, 1967)
- Los York's 68 (MAG, 1968)
- Los York's 69 (MAG, 1969)
- Ritmo y sentimiento (El Virrey, 1970)

=== Compilation ===
- El Viaje 1966-1974 (Munster Records, 2008)

=== Video ===
Video made with the review of the album THE Yorks - The Journey: 1966-1974, edited by Munster Records, Spain. Note Arturo Vigil and video by Luis Vigil.4.

== Band members ==
- Paulo Luna (lead vocals)
- Walter Pas (lead guitar)
- Roman Palacios (Rhythm guitar)
- Jesus Vilchez (bass)
- Pacho Aguilar (drums)

== See also ==
- Peruvian rock

== Additional information ==
- Fernando Tuesta, Reseña los Yorks, Blog PUCP Fernando Tuesta Soldevilla.
- Raul Cachay, "Diagnóstico: intoxicados por el ritmo" (Articulo). Edicion Impresa El Comercio, 2009.
