= HDH =

HDH could refer to:

- Dillingham Airfield, in Hawaii, United States
- Haa Dhaalu Atoll, an administrative division of the Maldives
- Hampstead Heath railway station, England
- Hawker de Havilland, an Australian aircraft manufacturer
- Hi-de-Hi!, a British sitcom
- Hipster Daddy-O and the Handgrenades, an American band
- Histidinol dehydrogenase
- Holland-Dozier-Holland, an American songwriting and production team
- Huelga De Hambre, a Peruvian band
- Kelvin Herrera, Wade Davis, and Greg Holland, a trio of American baseball pitchers with the Kansas City Royals
