= Guns N' Roses 2026 Tour =

2026 concert tour by Guns N' Roses

- Tour by Guns N' Roses
- Location: Asia; Europe; North America; Oceania; South America
- Start date: March 28, 2026
- End date: December 17, 2026
- No. of shows: 53
- Supporting acts: Halestorm; Raimundos; Stephen Wilson Jr; The Barbarians of California; Mammoth; Public Enemy; The Black Crowes; Ice Cube; Pierce the Veil; XCOMM; Girish and the Chronicles; Parikrama; 9 Dewa Gitar; Airbourne

Guns N' Roses concert chronology
- Because What You Want & What You Get Are Two Completely Different Things Tour (2025); Guns N' Roses 2026 Tour (2026)

American hard rock band Guns N' Roses toured throughout 2026. The tour was announced in November 2025.

On March 27, 2026, the day before the tour began, the group announced that keyboardist Melissa Reese would not be joining it "due to unforeseen personal reasons". No replacement was named.

The tour opened on March 28 at the Tecate Pa'l Norte festival in Monterrey, Mexico. It continued with a Brazil leg in April and dates across Europe, before a North American stadium run opened on July 23 at Carter-Finley Stadium in Raleigh, North Carolina, with support from acts including the Black Crowes, Public Enemy, and Ice Cube. As of October 2026, the tour is scheduled to continue through Asia and Oceania, with dates in India, Indonesia, Singapore, Australia, and New Zealand ending on December 17.

== Set list ==
The following set list is taken from the concert held on April 30, 2026, in Hollywood. It may not represent all concerts for the duration of the tour.

1. "Welcome to the Jungle"
2. "Bad Obsession"
3. "Mr. Brownstone"
4. "Slither" (Velvet Revolver cover)
5. "It's So Easy"
6. "Live and Let Die" (Wings cover)
7. "Sabbath Bloody Sabbath" (Black Sabbath cover)
8. "Estranged"
9. "You Could Be Mine"
10. "Yesterdays"
11. "Nothin'"
12. "Double Talkin' Jive"
13. "Better"
14. "Civil War" (with outro from "Voodoo Child (Slight Return)" by Jimi Hendrix)
15. "Shadow of Your Love"
16. "Atlas"
17. "Don't Cry"
18. "Rocket Queen"
19. "Wichita Lineman" (Jimmy Webb cover)
20. "Attitude" (Misfits cover)
21. "Coma"
22. Slash guitar solo (preceded by band introductions)
23. "Sweet Child o' Mine"
24. "Knockin' on Heaven's Door" (Bob Dylan cover)
25. "November Rain"
26. "This I Love"
27. "Nightrain"
28. "Paradise City"

== Tour dates ==
List of 2026 concerts, showing date, city, country, venue, opening act, tickets sold, number of available tickets, and amount of gross revenue
Date (2026)	City	Country	Venue	Opening act	Attendance	Revenue
March 28 (Note: The performance in Monterrey on March 28, 2026, was part of Tecate Pa'l Norte.)	Monterrey	Mexico	Parque Fundidora	—N/a	—	—
April 1	Porto Alegre	Brazil	Jockey Club (Note: The Porto Alegre show was originally announced for Estádio Beira-Rio.)	Halestorm	—	—
April 4 (Note: The performance in São Paulo on April 4, 2026, was part of Monsters of Rock 2026.)	São Paulo	Brazil	Allianz Parque	—N/a	—	—
April 7	São José do Rio Preto	Brazil	Recinto de Exposições Alberto Bertelli Lucatto	Raimundos	—	—
April 9	Campo Grande	Brazil	Autódromo Orlando Moura (Note: The Campo Grande show was added after the original announcement.)	Raimundos	—	—
April 12	Cariacica (Note: Originally announced as "Vitória".)	Brazil	Estádio Estadual Kleber José de Andrade	Raimundos	—	—
April 15	Salvador	Brazil	Arena Fonte Nova	Raimundos	—	—
April 18	Fortaleza	Brazil	Arena Castelão	Raimundos	—	—
April 21	São Luís	Brazil	Estádio Governador João Castelo	Raimundos	—	—
April 25	Belém	Brazil	Estádio Olímpico do Pará	Raimundos	—	—
April 30 (Note: The performance in Hollywood on April 30, 2026, was part of Formula 1 Miami Grand Prix week and was the band's first U.S. show since 2023.)	Hollywood	United States	Hard Rock Live	Stephen Wilson Jr	—	—
May 5	Hollywood	United States	Hard Rock Live	The Barbarians of California	—	—
May 7 (Note: The performance in Daytona Beach on May 7, 2026, was part of Welcome to Rockville.)	Daytona Beach	United States	Daytona International Speedway	—N/a	—	—
June 4	Gliwice	Poland	PreZero Arena	Mammoth	—	—
June 6	Gliwice	Poland	PreZero Arena	Mammoth	—	—
June 10	Dublin	Ireland	3Arena	Mammoth	—	—
June 13 (Note: The performance in Donington on June 13, 2026, was part of Download Festival.)	Donington	England	Donington Park	—N/a	—	—
June 18	Amsterdam	Netherlands	Ziggo Dome	Mammoth	—	—
June 20	Amsterdam	Netherlands	Ziggo Dome	Mammoth	—	—
June 23	Berlin	Germany	Uber Arena	Mammoth	—	—
June 25	Berlin	Germany	Uber Arena	Mammoth	—	—
June 28	Antwerp	Belgium	AFAS Dome	Mammoth	—	—
July 1	Paris	France	Accor Arena	Mammoth	—	—
July 3	Paris	France	Accor Arena	Mammoth	—	—
July 23	Raleigh	United States	Carter–Finley Stadium	Public Enemy	—	—
July 26	Saratoga Springs	United States	Saratoga Performing Arts Center	Public Enemy	—	—
July 29	Tinley Park	United States	Credit Union 1 Amphitheatre	Public Enemy	—	—
August 1	Hershey	United States	Hersheypark Stadium	Public Enemy	—	—
August 5	Toronto	Canada	Rogers Stadium	Public Enemy	—	—
August 8	Shakopee	United States	Mystic Lake Amphitheater	Public Enemy	—	—
August 12	East Rutherford	United States	MetLife Stadium	Public Enemy	—	—
August 16	St. Louis	United States	Busch Stadium (Note: The concert ended early because of rain and storms, after about 90 minutes.)	Public Enemy	—	—
August 19	Riverside (Note: Marketed as a Kansas City show.)	United States	Morton Amphitheater (Note: Doors were delayed due to severe weather, but the concert went ahead.)	The Barbarians of California	—	—
August 22	Las Vegas	United States	Allegiant Stadium	The Black Crowes	—	—
August 26	Edmonton	Canada	Commonwealth Stadium	The Black Crowes	—	—
August 29	Vancouver	Canada	BC Place	The Black Crowes	—	—
September 2	San Diego	United States	Snapdragon Stadium	The Black Crowes	—	—
September 5	Pasadena	United States	Rose Bowl	Ice Cube	—	—
September 9	Arlington	United States	Globe Life Field	Pierce the Veil	—	—
September 12	Ridgedale	United States	Thunder Ridge Nature Arena	The Barbarians of California	—	—
September 16	San Antonio	United States	Alamodome	Pierce the Veil	—	—
September 19	Atlanta	United States	Truist Park	XCOMM	—	—
November 14	Bengaluru	India	NICE Grounds	Girish and the Chronicles	—	—
November 17	Guwahati	India	Khanapara Veterinary Ground	Parikrama	—	—
November 21	Jakarta	Indonesia	Madya Stadium	9 Dewa Gitar	—	—
November 25	Singapore		National Stadium	—	—	—
November 29 (Note: The performance in Adelaide on November 29, 2026, was the bp Adelaide Grand Final Sunday concert.)	Adelaide	Australia	Adelaide Street Circuit	Airbourne	—	—
December 2	Townsville	Australia	Queensland Country Bank Stadium	Airbourne	—	—
December 5	Brisbane	Australia	Suncorp Stadium	Airbourne	—	—
December 8	Newcastle	Australia	McDonald Jones Stadium	Airbourne	—	—
December 11	Melbourne	Australia	Marvel Stadium	Airbourne	—	—
December 14	Sydney	Australia	ENGIE Stadium	Airbourne	—	—
December 17	Auckland	New Zealand	Eden Park	Airbourne	—	—
Total					—	—

List of cancelled concerts, showing date, city, country, venue and reason for cancellation
Date	City	Country	Venue	Reason
April 10, 2026	Rio de Janeiro	Brazil	Estádio Nilton Santos	Production logistics

== Personnel ==
=== Guns N' Roses ===
- Axl Rose – lead vocals, piano, percussion
- Slash – lead guitar, talkbox, slide guitar, pedal steel
- Duff McKagan – bass, backing vocals, lead vocals
- Dizzy Reed – keyboards, piano, percussion, backing vocals
- Richard Fortus – rhythm guitar, lead guitar, backing vocals
- Isaac Carpenter – drums, percussion

=== Guests ===
- Carrie Underwood – vocals during the songs "Sweet Child o' Mine" and "Paradise City" (September 19, 2026)
