= Miki González =

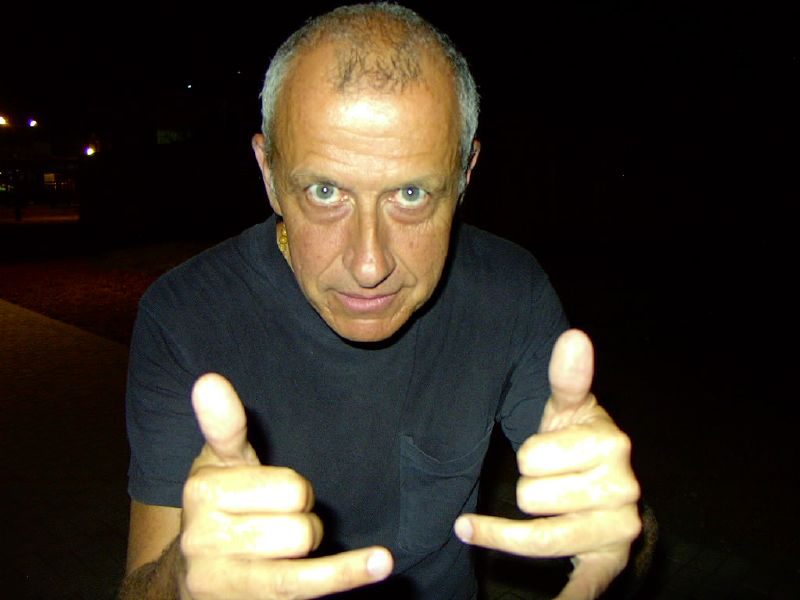
- Miki González in 2006.

Background information
- Born: Juan Manuel González Mascías; April 14, 1952 (age 74)
- Origin: Madrid
- Genres: Rock, pop rock, Peruvian music, New wave
- Occupations: Musician, songwriter, singer
- Instruments: Guitar and vocals
- Years active: 1984–present

Juan Manuel González Mascías (born April 14, 1952) better known as Miki González, is a Spanish-Peruvian musician, composer, and producer born in Madrid, Spain. He is recognized as a musical icon of the twentieth century in Peru, and his songs (such as "Akundún", "Dímelo, Dímelo" and "Vamos a Tocache") are frequently ranked among the best songs in Peruvian popular music.

Throughout his successful musical career, Miki became famous for being the pioneer in mixing rock with traditional Afro-Peruvian and Andean music.

He has collaborated with many artists, including: Mar de Copas, Narcosis, Charly García, Cementerio Club, Los Abuelos de la Nada, Andrés Calamaro, Jaime Cuadra, among others.

He studied and completed his musical training at the prestigious Berklee College of Music in Boston.

== Discography ==
- Puedes ser tú (1986)
- Tantas veces (1987)
- Nunca les creí (1989)
- Akundún (1992)
- Miki González (1995)
- González Blues (1996)
- Mikongo y su Kachanga (1998)
- Café Inkaterra (2004)
- Etno Tronics: Apu Sessions (2005)
- Inka Beats: Apu Sessions (2006)
- Inka Beats Iskay (2006)
- Hi-Fi Stereo (2007)
- Landó por bulerías (2009)
- Fiesta Inkaterra (2011)
- Caitro & Félix (2016)
- Perú Ethno Beats (2017)
- Inka Beats Kimsa (2019)

== See also ==
- Peruvian rock
