= Dolores Delirio =

Peruvian rock band

- Origin: Lima, Peru
- Genres: Gothic Rock, Post punk
- Years active: 1994 – present
- Labels: Navaja Producciones, Barbarosa Music, Sony Music Peru, Independent
- Members: Ricardo Brenneisen; José Inoñán; Joe Silva Quiroz; Arturo Ríos
- Website: www.doloresdelirio.com

Dolores Delirio is a Peruvian rock band formed in 1994 by guitarist Jeffrey Parra, drummer/lyricist Josué Vásquez, bassist/keyboardist Jose Inoñan and vocalist Ricardo Brenneisen. Throughout their fifteen-year career, the sound of the band has shifted from 1980s darkwave to gothic rock to hard rock and now is simply rock.

== History ==
=== Cero (1994–1997) ===
Their first album, Cero, was released by Navaja Producciones in 1995 as a cassette only. The recording of the album's ten songs took place in El Techo Studios in Lima and, to save time and money, Vásquez did not record his drums live; they were sequenced with a drum machine. The album contains Vásquez's "A Cualquier Lugar" and Brenneisen's "Carmen", two songs now considered classics for the band. Many people believe that Cero is the best Peruvian rock album of the 1990s, a mixture of post-punk and rock en español. The compact disc version was released in 1996.

=== Dolores Delirio (1997–1998) ===
In 1997 they released their self-titled second album Dolores Delirio, better known to fans as "Bajo un envenenado cielo plateado" due to the cover picture. Executive producer Mathin Chan felt that in order to capture the band in a more natural environment, the album needed to be recorded live, with some minor overdubbing done later in the studio. The album contains five live versions of songs that were in the first album and nine new songs.

A year later founding member guitarist Jeffrey Parra was killed in a car accident. The band continued with Luciano Agüero, and then Juan Carlos Anchante as the new guitarist.

=== Uña y Carne (1999) ===
In 1999 they released one of the best-selling albums in Peru, the compilation Uña y Carne, which contained all their best songs.

=== Raiz (2000–2001) ===
The following year they released Raíz, an album with more ambience and pop sounds. Songs like "Silencio" and "Orilla" showed the newfound maturity of the band.

=== El Ultimo Viaje - On and Off and On Again (2003) ===
In 2001 Dolores Delirio separated. In 2003 they reunited to do a farewell tour of the main cities of Peru and when the tour ended they again went into an indefinite hiatus to reunite again in 2005 with Gino Valdivieso as the guitarist.

=== The End of the Brenneisen Era (2006) ===
In 2006 lead singer Ricardo Brenneisen announced his departure from the band. Fans expected the dissolution of the band.

=== Histeria and Plastico Divino (2007–2009) ===
Dolores Delirio announced that they will continue with a new singer and release a new album. The lead singer was kept secret until 2007 when they announced that Luis Sanguinetti was the new lead singer and they were working on an EP entitled Histeria. Luis Sanguinetti is known for being the bassist for Leusemia for 8 years, and for his public fight with Leusemia's lead singer Daniel F. In December 2007 they released Histeria EP; it was one of the best-selling records in Peru during 2007. They released the singles "Histeria" and "Cielo/Infierno". In March 2008, they released their first studio album in eight years, Plástico Divino. After two years with the band, Sanguinetti left the band to move with his family to Cuzco.

=== Atrapa La Luz (2009- ) ===
In September 2009 a strange turn of events led Ricardo Brenneisen—who months before, in an interview to Terra.com, said that he would never return to Dolores Delirio—to rejoin the band. Currently the band is working on new material (two new songs) for a new compilation and preparing for a national tour of Peru at the end of the year.

== Band members ==
- José "Pepe" Inoñán - bass, keyboards and programming (1994–Present)
- Ricardo Brenneisen - vocals and lyrics (1994–Present)
- Joe Silva Quiroz - guitar (2010–Present)
- Roberto Sosa - guitar (1999–2003; 2015–Present)
- Arturo Ríos - drums (2010–Present)

== Past members ==
- Jeffrey Parra - guitar (1994–1998) - Deceased
- Luciano Agüero - guitar (1997–1998, 2002–2003)
- Gino Valdivieso - guitar (2005–2006)
- Luis Sanguinetti - vocals (1997, 2007–2009)
- Juan Carlos Anchante - guitar (1998–2000, 2001, 2003, 2006–2010)
- Josué Vásquez - batería (1994–2010)

== Discography ==
=== Main Albums ===
- 1995 - Cero (Navaja Producciones)
- 1997 - Dolores Delirio (Barbarosa Records)
- 2000 - Raíz (Sony Records Peru)
- 2008 - Plástico Divino (Independent)

=== Demo-Tapes ===
During 1994 and 1995, the band released three demo-tapes:

- "Dolores Delirio"
- "Concierto en La Católica-Artes"
- "En El Condorock"

=== Compilations ===
- 1999 - Uña y Carne (IEMPSA)

=== EPs ===
- 2007 - Histeria (Independent)

=== Live ===
- 1997 - Acustico en Nardo's Pub
- 2001 - Mas alla del Cero

=== DVDs ===
- 2010 - (en)auditorio

== Facts ==
- Dolores Delirio is a word play on the Spanish name "Dolores" which literally means "pain" and "Delirio" which means "delirium". The name in also a pun on famous Mexican actress Dolores Del Rio.
