= Dalevuelta =

- Origin: Lima, Peru
- Genres: Punk rock, Melodic hardcore
- Years active: 1998–2009; 2014–present
- Label: Independent
- Members: Renzo Lancho (vocals, guitar); Diego Del Rosario (bass); Walter "Chuki" Sotomayor (drums); Michael "Mike" Rodríguez (bass); Luis Naval (drums)

Dalevuelta is a Peruvian punk rock band from Lima, formed in 1998. Academic studies and specialized publications identify it as part of the independent scene that developed in Lima during the late 1990s and early 2000s. The band has been cited in academic and specialized literature as part of the consolidation of the genre in the country.

The band appears in reference works on punk in Latin America and historical compendiums of Peruvian rock.

== History ==
Sociological research by the Institute of Peruvian Studies (IEP) analyzes Dalevuelta as one of the projects linked to youth identities in the Lima punk scene of the early 2000s. Their emergence was noted internationally by the US publication Maximumrocknroll, which included the band in its report on new Peruvian groups.

After announcing a hiatus in early 2009, the group held reunion shows that were covered by the national press. Between 2015 and 2016, anniversary concerts were reported in Lima and Arequipa by local media.

Mentions of the band's activity outside Peru have appeared in specialized European media.

The band has been reported as participating in major festivals such as "Día del Rock Peruano" at the National Stadium of Peru.

Studies from the Pontifical Catholic University of Peru (PUCP) cite the band's early albums as examples of musical self-management within the independent rock scene.

== Critical reception ==
Coverage of the band's early work appeared in European music press. In 2002, the Spanish magazine La Factoría del Ritmo highlighted the group's local following and described its style as melodic with rockabilly and 1960s influences, characterizing the songs as "direct and effective".

In 2014, the newspaper El Comercio described the band's first two albums as indispensable within the chronology of contemporary Peruvian rock. Other media have included the band's releases in retrospective lists of notable Peruvian rock albums.

In 2025, the band was reported as a guest artist at a concert by Marky Ramone, an event covered by the Peruvian state news agency.

== Discography ==
- Fuimos lo que somos (1999)
- A mí qué chucha tú (2002)
- Mundo de papel (2004)
- Acústica (2005)
- A.S.N.O. (2008)
- Fuimos y lo somos (2014)
- 174517 A y B (2020)
- Sudamerican Psycho (2022)
- Grandes Éxitos Vol. 1 (2023)
- Grandes Éxitos Vol. 2 (2024)

== See also ==
- Peruvian rock
- Punk rock in Latin America
