= Songdo Moonlight Festival Park =

Park in Incheon, South Korea

- 송도달빛축제공원
- Interactive map of Songdo Moonlight Festival Park
- Location: Songdo-dong, Yeonsu-gu, Incheon, South Korea.
- Coordinates: 37°24′23″N 126°38′02″E
- Status: Open all year
- Parking: Available
- Website: www.insiseol.or.kr/park/songdo/facility/moonlight.jsp (in Korean)

Songdo Moonlight Festival Park (Korean: 송도달빛축제공원) is a park in Songdo-dong, Yeonsu-gu, Incheon, South Korea.

== Events ==
The park is popular for events. One such event held in the park is the Songdo Wind Festival (송도 바람축제), where families can fly kites and ride hot air balloons.

=== Festivals ===
Various cultural festivals came to be held at the festival park.

- Pentaport Rock Festival
- Songdo Beer Festival

=== Concerts ===
==== 2019 ====
- Ed Sheeran: ÷ Tour

==== 2023 ====
- KBS Grand Project concert – g.o.d

==== 2025 ====
- Guns N' Roses: Because What You Want & What You Get Are Two Completely Different Things

== Transport ==
The park is accesible by the Songdo Moonlight Festival Park station of Incheon Subway Line 1.
