= A la mierda lo demás =

A La Mierda Lo Demás

Studio album by Leusemia
- Released: 1998
- Studio: Huaspingo
- Genre: Punk rock, alternative rock

Leusemia chronology
Leusemia (2003)	A La Mierda Lo Demás (1998)	Moxón (2007)

A La Mierda Lo Demás ("Fuck the Rest") is the third album of the band Leusemia. After nearly seven years off the stage, the band decides to return and make a new album but changing its genre. They said "it would not be underground rock, if not progressive rock, because that was the fashion at the time. The real name of the album is called A la mierda lo demás: Asesinando el mito (Fuck the Rest: Killing the Myth)".

== Songs ==
1. Introdukción
2. Un lugar
3. En una invernal noche de surf
4. No hay futuro
5. Cuando las bocas se cierran
6. Siete años sobre un sueño
7. Al ramerío!
8. Por los caminos del alcohol
9. Oirán tu voz, oirán nuestra voz
10. Por la senda del pastel
11. Hablar nada más ke pekatión
12. El asesino de la ilusión
13. Al colegio no voy más
14. Barras malditas
15. Eskethú, el sionista ke no puso más
16. La caracola subterránea
17. Criptetésia infernal
18. Demolición
19. Outrodikción

BONUS TRACKS

1. En una invernal noche de surf/No hay futuro (vivo)
2. Hastalculo (vivo)
3. En este disímil lugar (vivo)
4. Al colegio no voy más (vivo)
5. Por la senda del pastel (vivo)
6. Demolición (vivo)

== Members ==
- Daniel F (vocals and guitar)
- Leo Scoria (bass)
- Kimba Vilis (drums)
