= Turbopótamos =

Peruvian skabilly rock band

- Origin: Lima, Peru
- Genres: Rock, ska, rockabilly, surf rock
- Years active: 2000–2010; 2016–present
- Labels: Discos Gordos, Mundano Records
- Members: Humberto Campodónico; Julio Pérez Luna; Bruno Sánchez
- Past members: Mayu Velasco; Marco Quintana; Ernesto Velarde; Juan Luis Loqal; Johann Frech; Hernando Suárez
- Website: turbopotamos.net

Turbopótamos is a Peruvian rock band formed in Lima in 2000. Their style, described as skabilly, fuses ska with rockabilly. They are considered one of the most representative bands of Peru's alternative rock scene.

== History ==
The band's self-titled debut album (2004) was selected by El Comercio as one of the best Peruvian albums of the year, giving them national recognition. That same year, they represented Peru at the Rock en Ñ festival alongside Mar de Copas and Pelo Madueño.

Their third album, No Love (2007), released by Discos Gordos, marked their international breakthrough, leading to tours in Argentina and Brazil.

In 2009, Turbopótamos performed at the Lima Hot Festival with R.E.M. and Travis before 35,000 people at the Estadio Nacional del Perú. They also opened for Oasis in Lima before 45,000 fans. That year, their music appeared in the Mexican film Voy a explotar and the Peruvian film El premio.

In 2010, they released two albums simultaneously: En Público (live) and En Privado (unreleased tracks). The band disbanded in 2011, and vocalist Humberto Campodónico was later honored by Apdayc for his song “Nada para mí”.

The band reunited in 2016, and in 2019 released Terremoto, their first studio album in 15 years. In 2024, they released the single Misión a Marte, continuing their evolution with urban and electronic influences.

== Streaming and legacy ==
On Spotify, Turbopótamos averages around 5,500 monthly listeners. Their most streamed track is “Ultra Beba,” with more than 547,000 plays, followed by “Adicto” (351,000), “El Metro” (285,000), and “El Ratón Matón” (227,000).

“Ultra Beba” in particular has become their defining streaming hit, also surpassing 178,000 views on YouTube.

The 2007 single “No Love,” has around 75,000 streams on Spotify, showing that their early fan favorites now lead in digital popularity.

== Discography ==
- Turbopótamos (EP, 2001)
- Turbopótamos (2004)
- No Love (2007)
- Terrorize You / Disco Flor (Single, 2008)
- 2012 (EP, 2009)
- En Público (2010)
- En Privado (2010)
- Terremoto (2019)
- Llora Llora Corazón (Single, 2019)
- Infierno Viral (Single, 2019)
- True Confession (Single, 2021)
- F (Single, 2022)
- Misión A Marte (Single, 2024)
- Deja Las Palabras (Single, 2025)
