= Fiorella Cava =

Peruvian musician

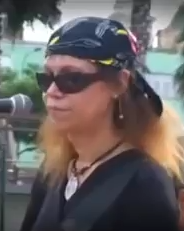
- Cava in 2012
- Born: May 31, 1960 (age 65); Lima, Peru
- Occupation(s): Musician and transgender rights activist

Fiorella Vincenza Cava Goicochea (Note: Fiorella was known as Sergio Vinicio Cava Goicochea before changing her legal name following a ruling by the Lima Superior Court.) (born May 31, 1960) is a singer, musician and activist for transgender rights in Peru.

== Personal life ==
Cava studied law at the Pontifical Catholic University of Peru and communication sciences at the University of Lima. At the same time, she began a career as a musician, which led her to prepare a law thesis on intellectual rights in the recording industry. Later, at the age of 23, she obtained the position of manager at the Consortium of Music Publishers of Peru.

Her musical career began with the band Hielo, with whom she recorded her first hit, El rock del vago, which was among the most listened to songs on Panamericana Radio in 1983. Three years later, in 1986, together with drummer Jesús Hurtado and bassist Alex Nathanson, she formed the band JAS. The following year, they released Mueres en tu ley, whose promotional single Ya no quiero más ska became the band's most recognized song. In 1992, they released their second album, "¿De qué te quejas?", which did not receive the same response as the first.

After the dissolution of JAS in 1995, Fiorella Cava stepped back from public life to begin her transition. After traveling through Argentina, Chile, and Spain, she decided to return to Lima to live openly with her new gender identity. In 2004, during her master's degree in History and Anthropology of Culture at the National University of San Marcos, she published Identidad, cultura y sociedad: un grito desde el silencio, one of the first academic texts on transgenderism in Peru. After a fourteen-year legal battle, the Superior Court of Lima ruled in 2012 in her favor, and she was able to legally change her name on her identity document. Her success was covered in Peruvian news, and she received media hostility, even being attacked by a group of far right in a park in Lima, a fact that she denounced. As a transgender rights activist, she founded the first transgender association in Peru, CISNE (Centro de Identidad y Sexualidad Nueva Existencia).

She would eventually return to music as a soloist, releasing Rituales vacíos in 2009 with producer Dante Gonzáles. In 2020, JAS reformed with new members, with Cava doing vocals, and released the double CD Antología 1986 – 2019. Since 2021, she has led an experimental musical project called C.A.V.A.

== Discography ==
=== With Hielo ===
- El rock del vago (1983)

=== With JAS ===
- Mueres en tu ley (1987)
- ¿De qué te quejas? (1992)
- Antología 1986 – 2019 (2020)

=== Solo works ===
- Rituales vacíos (2009)

== Publications ==
- Identidad, cultura y sociedad: un grito desde el silencio (2004)

== Filmography ==
- Sarita Colonia, la tregua moral

== See also ==
- JAS (band)
- LGBTQ rights in Peru
