= JAS (band) =

Peruvian rock band

- Also known as: J.A.S.
- Origin: Lima, Peru
- Genres: Peruvian rock; Ska; Post-punk
- Years active: 1986–present
- Labels: CBS; CAL Comunicaciones
- Members: Fiorella Cava (vocals, guitar)
- Past members: Joni Chiappe (keyboards)† Jesús "Jotache" Hurtado (drums); Coco Cortés (bass); Alex Nathanson (bass); César Leiva (keyboards)
- Website: facebook.com/JASPaginaOficial/

JAS (also styled J.A.S.) is a Peruvian rock and ska band formed in Lima in 1986. The band is best known for the track "Ya no quiero más ska", described as one of the most representative songs of Peruvian rock.

== History ==
=== Formation (1986) ===
JAS was formed in 1986 in Lima by Fiorella Cava (vocals and guitar), drummer Jesús "Jotache" Hurtado, and bassist Alex Nathanson. The name JAS derived from the initials of the founding members. The lineup was subsequently expanded with the addition of keyboardist Joni Chiappe and bassist Coco Cortés, who replaced Nathanson.

=== Mueres en tu ley and commercial breakthrough (1987–1989) ===
The band recorded their debut album at studios RAV in Lima between April and October 1987. The album, Mueres en tu ley, was released in December 1987 under CBS Discos del Perú, after the label signed the band on the strength of the single "Personalidad". The album included the tracks "Personalidad", "Ya no quiero más ska", "Hubo en el mundo", and "Me voy de aquí", several of which received music video rotation on Peruvian television. "Ya no quiero más ska" was written and recorded quickly, added to the album as a late replacement for another track the label had rejected. The song remained at the top of Peruvian radio charts for several months.

=== Hiatus and second album (1992) ===
Following the success of their debut, the band entered a period of reduced activity. In 1992 they released their second album, ¿De qué te quejas?, under the label CAL Comunicaciones, which did not achieve the commercial reception of their first record.

=== Return and later work (2005–present) ===
In 2005, Cava returned with a reformed lineup to release Vuelves en tu ley. In 2020, a new incarnation of JAS released the double-CD retrospective Antología 1986–2019, featuring the band's catalogue alongside previously unreleased material.

On 30 March 2023, founding keyboardist and co-founder Joni Chiappe died following a sudden illness. Chiappe had also been a member of the Beatles tribute band Un día en la vida, and had worked as a producer and arranger on numerous Peruvian rock albums.

== Legacy ==
"Ya no quiero más ska" has surpassed nine million streams on Spotify and has been described as an "immortal hit" and one of the most representative songs in the history of Peruvian rock.

Fiorella Cava has been recognised as one of the most prominent transgender musicians in Latin America and as a long-standing LGBTQ+ rights activist in Peru.

== Members ==
Current

- Fiorella Cava – vocals, guitar (1986–present)

Former

- Jesús "Jotache" Hurtado – drums (1986–?)
- Alex Nathanson – bass (1986–1987)
- Joni Chiappe – keyboards (1987–?, died 2023)
- Coco Cortés – bass (1987–?)
- César Leiva – keyboards

== Discography ==
=== Studio albums ===
Title	Year	Label	Notes
Mueres en tu ley	1987	CBS Discos del Perú	Debut album; recorded at Estudios RAV, Lima
¿De qué te quejas?	1992	CAL Comunicaciones	
Vuelves en tu ley	2005	CAL Comunicaciones	

=== Compilations ===
Title	Year	Notes
Evolución 1987–1996	1996	
Antología 1986–2019	2020	Double CD; released with reformed lineup
