= Huelga de Hambre =

Peruvian band

- Origin: Lima, Peru
- Genres: Punk, emo, alternative rock, grunge, rock, heavy metal
- Years active: 1994–2000, 2007
- Members: Jhovan Tomasevich (vocals, guitars); Diego Larrañaga (bass); Hugo Vecco (lead guitar); Jose Gallo (drums)
- Past members: Luis Grande (guitar) (1994 - 1997)
- Website: https://www.angelfire.com/fl/hdhbio/javaent.html

Huelga de Hambre (shortened as HDH, Spanish for "Hunger Strike") is a Peruvian band, formed in Lima, Peru, around April 1994. They started to play covers from Pearl Jam, Soundgarden, Smashing Pumpkins, Black Crowes and Soul Asylum. And released their only album, M4QUINA Y ESPIR1TU (English: Machine and Soul), in 1998. Huelga de Hambre quickly developed a distinctive quality sound with clear resemblance of their grunge influences. It has been coined as the best "reincarnation" of the Seattle scene in Peru.

Even though the band was not widely known in the US market, it was the most salient representative of grunge music in Peru, and probably South America. They played in international venues as the PULULAHUA '99 on the same stage as with acclaimed bands like Aterciopelados and La Ley. And they also play two concerts in the US promoting their first CD in 2000. They are considered by many as the best Peruvian band of the 90's. They did win the first place in IV Concurso de Música Moderna (English: IV Contest of Modern Music) held in Lima in 1995, which certainly put them under the spotlight in the Peruvian rock scene.

They separated in 2000 and some of them gave birth to Zen and Theremyn 4.

== Discography ==
- M4QUINA Y ESPIR1TU (Pedorrera Records - 1998)

== Origin of the Band's Name ==
The name of the band, Huelga de Hambre, is Spanish for Hunger Strike, a clear homage to the band Temple of the Dog. Temple of the Dog was formed by future members of Soundgarden and Pearl Jam, which comprises most of Huelga de Hambre's influences.

== Reunion ==
Huelga de Hambre got together on July 17, 2007 to play one concert in La Noche de Barranco to commemorate the 10th anniversary of the tragic decease of their former member and friend: Luis Grande. The reunion concert was a complete success. And it gave one more chance to nostalgic fans to see them once again.
