= 6 Voltios =

Peruvian punk rock band

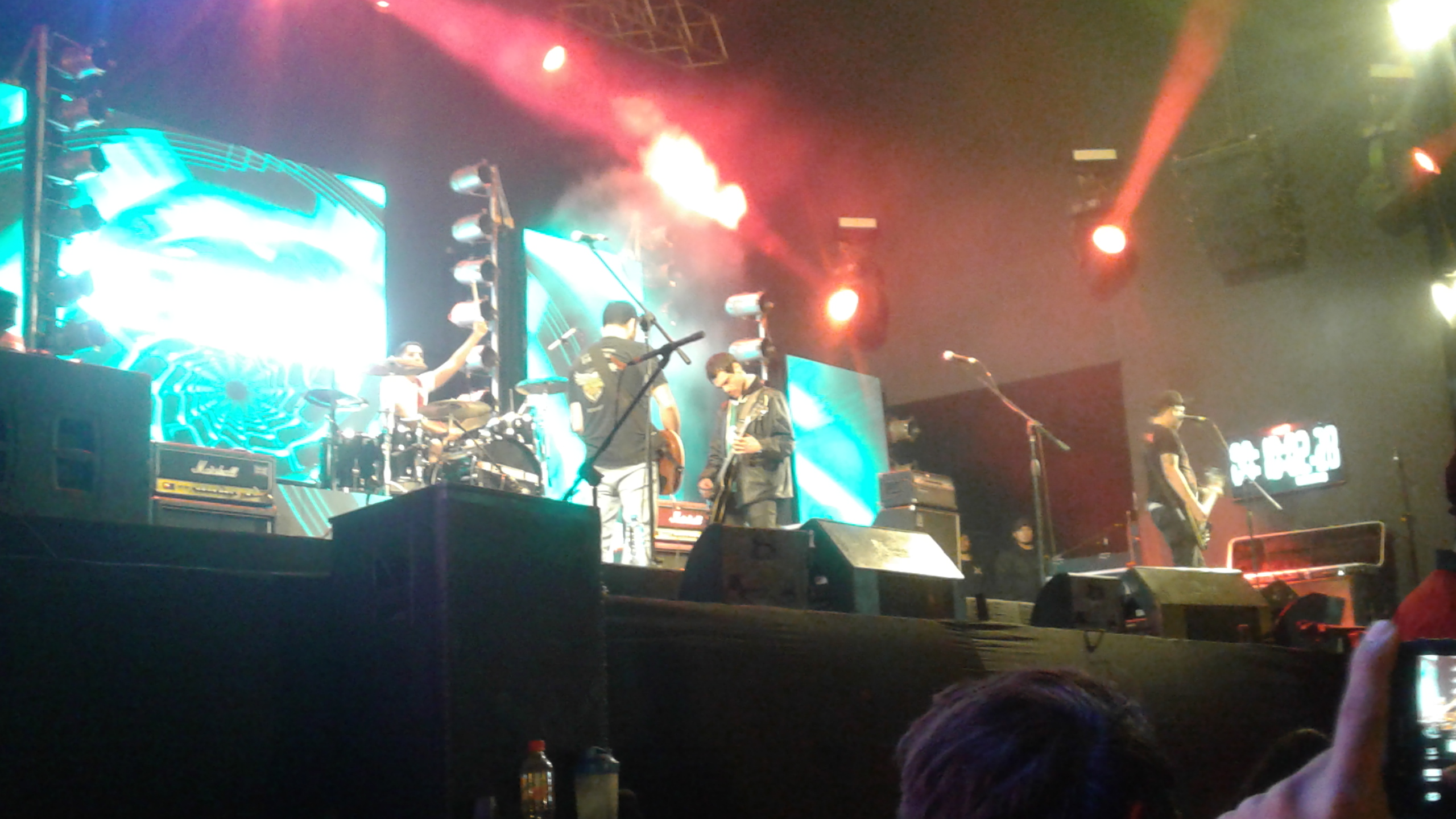

Background information
- Origin: Lima, Peru
- Genres: Punk rock
- Years active: 1998–Present
- Labels: Calavera Records
- Members: Alexis Korfiatis; Marcel Caillaux; Alvaro Charapaqui
- Past members: Emilio Bruce
- Website: http://www.6voltios.com

6 Voltios is a Peruvian punk rock band formed in 1998 that currently consists of Alexis Korfiatis, Marcel Caillaux and Mauritius Llona. The band won popularity since 1999, when they released their debut-album Desde el sótano. 6 Voltios has released 6 studio albums, all with the approval of the Peruvian and Latin population.

== Band members ==
Current members

- Alexis Korfiatis – lead vocals, guitar (1998–present)
- Álvaro Charapaqui – drums, backing vocals (2013–present)
- César Ríos – bass guitar, backing vocals (2013–present)

Former members

- Emilio Bruce – bass guitar (1998–2009;2013-2013)
- Mauricio Llona – drums, backing vocals (1998–2013)
- Marcel Caillaux – bass guitar, backing vocals (2009–2013)

== Discography ==
- 1999 – Desde el sótano
- 2001 – Generación Perdida
- 2002 – Tan solo una vez más
- 2003 – Día Plástico
- 2006 – Descompresión
- 2010 – 5 canciones que nunca debieron salir
