= XDinero =

Peruvian rock-ska band

- Also known as: Las Locas de Por Dinero
- Origin: Arequipa, Peru
- Genres: Rock and roll, ska, ragee, hard rock
- Years active: 1986–1997; 2000–present
- Label: Industrias Eléctricas y Musicales Peruanas S.A (IEMPSA)
- Members: Roni Carbajal Yrigoyen; Chris Little; Erick Condori; Arturo Cardenas; Remo Calcina; Miguel Lizarraga; Luis Cornejo; Anthony Ortega
- Past members: Héctor Vera; Renato Galvez
- Website: www.xdinero.pe

XDinero ('For Money' in English) is a rock-ska band from Peru formed in 1986.

== Biography ==
The band formed after band Baretto had separated, so they set out to form their own band and record their own songs. They signed with local label IEMPSA. The band XDinero was successful in the sur of Peru, its success was so great that it reached the capital Lima (which is very difficult for bands from outside of Lima). They toured in Europe and Latin America. The band escaped death on a bus route to aconcert in Ica. The band still tours in Peru

== Discography ==
=== Studio albums ===
- Triste Realidad (1997)
- Por las Huevas (1999)
- Tocar fondo y brillar (2010)
- El Endeudado (2024)
- Ya vendieron el país (2025)
- CAFÉ CON LECHE (2026)
