= PAX217 =

American Christian rock band

- Also known as: Pax
- Origin: Orange County, California, United States
- Genres: Christian rock; rap rock; alternative rock; reggae; funk rock
- Years active: 1994–2005; 2010–present
- Label: Forefront
- Spinoffs: AVNER
- Members: Dave Tosti; Jesse Craig; Josh Auer; Joey Marchiano; Bobby Duran; Chris "Tito" Duran; Aaron "Skwid" Tosti
- Past members: Ethan Luck; Dan Sessum

PAX217 is an American Christian rock band from Orange County, California. The band's music gained popularity in the Christian rock scene in the early 2000s. PAX217's lineup consists of David Tosti on vocals, Jesse Craig on guitar, Josh Auer on bass, Joey Marchiano on drums, Chris "Tito" Duran on keyboards, and Bobby "Bobbito the Chef" Duran on turntables. Former members include Ethan Luck on guitar, Dan Sessum on guitar, and David Tosti's younger brother Aaron "Skwid" Tosti, who later played in Hawk Nelson, on drums. The band began in 1994 and broke up in 2005, but reunited in 2010.

== Name origin ==
The name comes from "Pax" which is Latin for "peace" and the Bible verse Ephesians 2:17.

== Musical styles ==
The band's style is a mix of punk rock and rap with some reggae influences, and has been compared to 311, Skindred, P.O.D., and Earthsuit.

== Career ==
PAX217 was formed in 1994 in Orange County, CA by Dave Tosti, Ethan Luck (who was replaced by Dan Sessum, Thaddeus Williams, and later by Jesse Craig), Josh Auer, and Dave's younger brother Aaron Tosti. They recorded a demo tape and months later signed with Forefront Records. In August 2000, Aaron left the band and was replaced by Joey Marchiano. Brothers Chris and Bobby Duran later joined the band on percussion and turntables, respectively. With Forefront, they released two albums: Twoseventeen on March 2, 2000, which featured No Place Like Home and AM (which was included on the soundtrack of the film Extreme Days), and Engage on May 21, 2002. They released an independent EP titled Check Your Pulse in Summer 2004. The same year, Chris and Bobby Duran left the band. PAX217 held their last concert on October 21, 2005 in Chino, CA.

The band reunited nearly five years later on July 2, 2010. They also played a one-off reunion show at the House of Blues in Anaheim, CA on February 18, 2013.

On February 17, 2017, the band announced another reunion show. This was confirmed on March 11, 2017, when The O.C. Supertones announced on Facebook Live that PAX217 would be the special guest for the 20th anniversary of Supertones Strike Back Celebration. The concert was held on June 3, 2017 at Shoreline Church in San Clemente, CA. PAX217 released an album of this performance, along with a previously unreleased track, in February 2018.

== Related acts ==
=== AVNER ===
AVNER was a short-lived pop punk band formed by bassist and vocalist Josh Auer and drummer Joey Marchiano after the breakup of PAX217. Todd Cooper played lead guitar and sang background vocals for the group. Jesse Craig joined the group as a 2nd guitarist for a few months before moving on. They were best known for their comical stage demeanor and lively commercials/promotions/interactions with fans. AVNER broke up shortly after Marchiano signed on to tour as a roadie with some large-name acts and Cooper married Sara Watkins of Nickel Creek in 2008.

== Band members ==
Current

- Dave Tosti – lead vocals, guitar, keyboards (1994–2005, 2010–present)
- Jesse Craig – lead guitar (1997–2005, 2010–present)
- Josh Auer – bass guitar, backing vocals (1994–2005, 2010–present)
- Bobby Duran – turntables, sampler, programming, backing vocals (2000–2004, 2010–present)
- Chris "Tito" Duran – percussion (2000–2004, 2010–present)
- Aaron Tosti – drums, backing vocals (1994–2000, 2010–present)

Past

- Ethan Luck – lead guitar (1994–1996)
- Thaddeus Williams – rhythm guitar (1997–1998)
- Dan Sessum – lead guitar (1996–1997)
- Joey Marchiano – drums, percussion (2000–2005, 2010)

Timeline

== Discography ==
- Twoseventeen, 2000 (ForeFront)
- Engage, 2002 (ForeFront) U.S. No. 191
- Check Your Pulse EP, 2004 (independent)
- Live Album 6.3.17, 2018

== Music videos ==
- "Prism" (from Twoseventeen)
- "A.M." (from Twoseventeen)
- "No Place Like Home" (from Twoseventeen)
