= Las Mojarras =

Coordinates: 26°41′S 66°03′W

- Municipality and village
- Interactive map of Las Mojarras
- Country: Argentina
- Province: Catamarca Province
- Time zone: UTC−3 (ART)

Las Mojarras is a village and municipality in Catamarca Province in northwestern Argentina.
