= Narcosis (band) =

Peruvian band

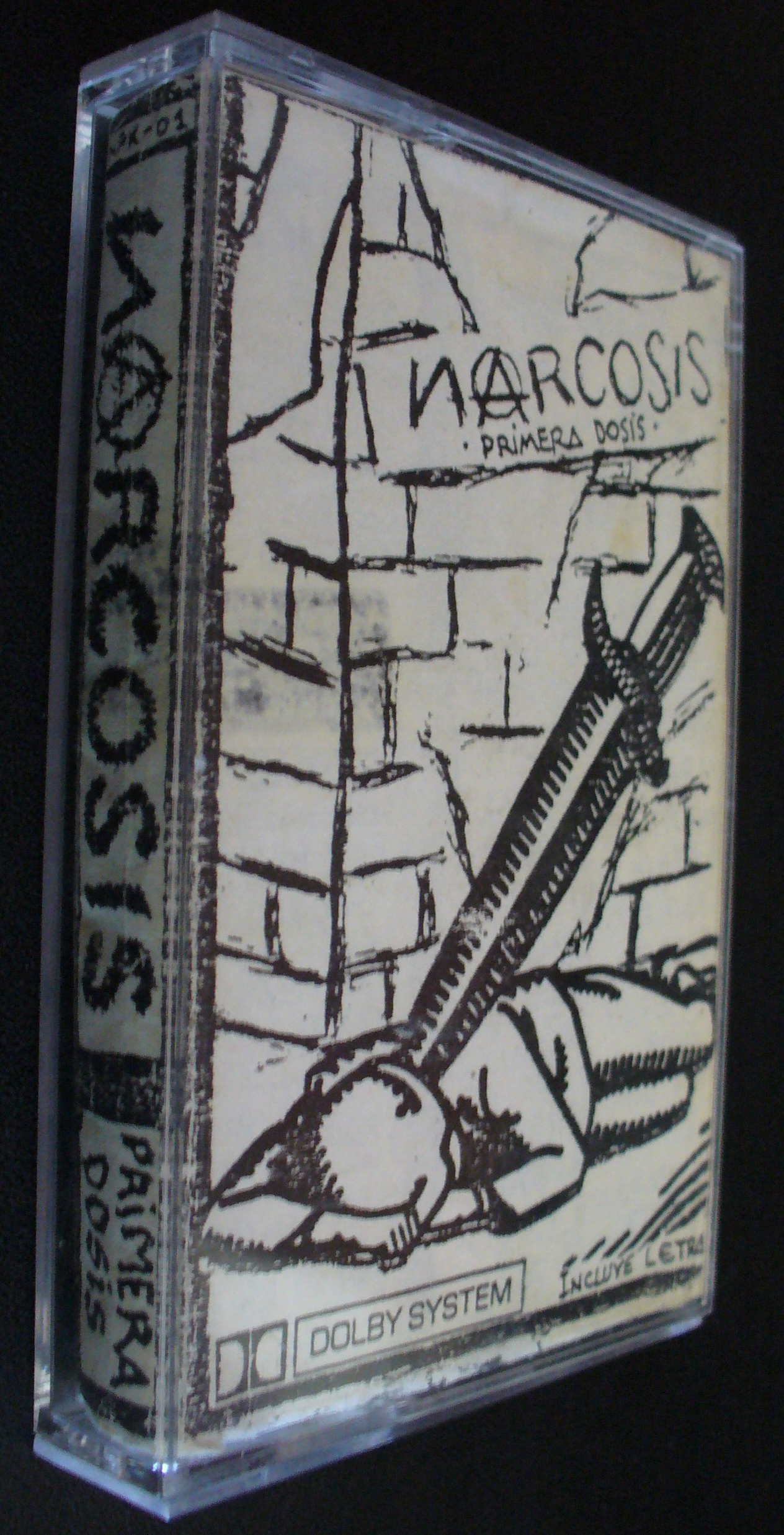
- "Primera Dosis" by Narcosis – 1985 cassette

Background information
- Origin: Lima, Peru
- Genres: Punk Rock, Anarcopunk, Peruvian Rock, Subterranean Rock
- Years active: 1984–1986, 2014–present
- Labels: Self-produced, Pasajeros del Horror
- Members: Luis "Wicho" García, Jorge "Pelo parao" Madueño
- Past members: Luis Piccini, Alvaro Carrillo "Gallito", Fernando "Cachorro" Vial

Narcosis is a Peruvian punk band originating in Lima. Formed in 1984, they were one of the first groups in the movement linked to Lima's underground punk rock scene of the 1980s. The band lasted a little over a year and released two self-funded albums. Despite its short existence, they are considered one of the most influential groups in Peruvian rock. Their debut album, a self-produced cassette tape called "Primera Dosis" (1985), has been called a "banner" and "point of reference" for Peruvian rock musicians, and the "most copied, recopied, and pirated album in the history of Peruvian rock." Despite being active for little more than a year, Narcosis is regarded as one of the most influential of Peruvian rock bands.

Narcosis is considered a cult group and has always spread its music outside the media. The band's lyrics, despite being their only available recording material, address topics such as: depression, the consequences of human indoctrination, blasphemy, negativity, the state of the world, anarchism, social activism, among other themes.

== History ==
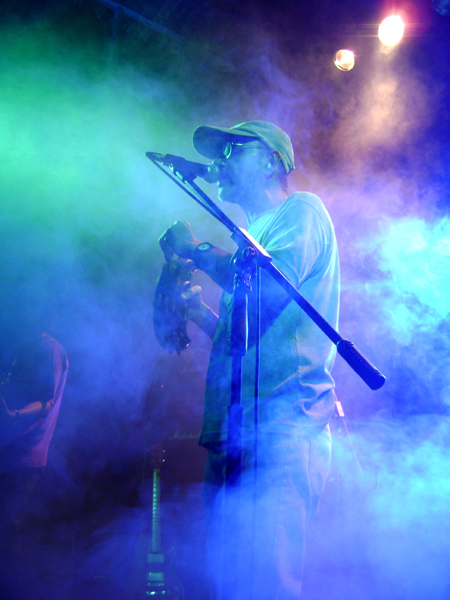
Wicho García on 2007, lead vocalist of the band.

=== Origin and Formation ===
The band has its origins in contacts made between Fernando Vial, Jorge Madueño and Alvaro Carrillo, when the latter two answered an ad placed in Segunda Mano ("Second Hand") magazine by Vial in late 1983. Carrillo later brought along a friend, Luis Piccini, who had a drum set. The band underwent several name changes. Initially, they were known as "Sociedad Anónima (S.A.)," (Anonymous Society), then "Los Descartados"(The Disposables or The Discarded), and later "Los Descartables" (The Thrown-Away or The Disposables). Madueño soon took over as drummer, as Piccini was too often unavailable for practice as he had a girlfriend. The band then settled on the name Narcosis, which Vial said was taken from the novel Siddhartha by Hermann Hesse: "It's simply a matter of fleeing from the self. It's a brief escape from being self, a brief narcosis against the pain and absurdity of life."

"The parallel movement of 'Underground Rock' was happening at that time in Lima and was made up of Punk and Hardcore bands that overlapped these Post-Punk groups." Narcosis' first gig was played at the Carnaby bar, where they filled the bill alongside now-classic Lima rock bands LeuZemia and Masacre, on October 6, 1984. Not long after that, the band was booked for another gig, this time at the Palizada Pub, but found itself short of a vocalist as Carrillo had left the group. Vial has said that Carrillo left the band due "reasons of fate", but elsewhere it has been suggested that part of the reason was that he and Carrillo had had difficulties. The spot was filled by Luís "Wicho" García, who was a friend of Vial's, and the band's final line-up was established.

==== "Primera Dosis," Successes and Concerts ====
Narcosis started practicing more, and writing their own music. In February 1985, they recorded their first album, Primera Dosis, in Madueño's living room using a portable 4-track tape recorder owned by García, which he rigged up with a microphone and a Walkman tape-player, thus allowing its use as mixing board.

The original run of Primera Dosis was of 200 cassette tapes. The album made an instant splash, being the first entirely-DIY rock album in Peru, and Narcosis was soon offered a recording contract by a Lima music label. The band, however, decided to continue independently. Their second album, Acto de Magia, recorded in 1985, is a live recording of a gig performed at the Magia bar in Lima's Barranco district. With limited resources, such as a portable 4-track recorder and a makeshift microphone, the demo became a symbol of artistic independence and cultural resistance in a context where commercial music dominated.

One of Narcosis' most notorious appearances took place on 17 February 1985, at the Rock en Rio Rímac festival in Lima's Rímac district. There, Narcosis played before a crowd of 5,000, alongside a number of other bands representing Lima's emerging "underground" scene. There was also a heavy police presence, and when Narcosis launched into their song "Sucio Policía" (Filthy Cop), the festival came to an abrupt end as the police showed their displeasure by firing into the air and rushing the stage.

In 1986 the band members drifted on their separate ways and into other projects. Vial joined the band Autopsia, García joined Miki González's band before becoming part of Mar de Copas, while Madueño joined the band Eructo Maldonado.

Narcosis reunited in 2001 for two 15th anniversary appearances, and have, since then, occasionally come together for other special events, sometimes with musician friends adding to the band's lineup. For example, they came together in 2007 for a concert in Medellín, Colombia and an appearance at Lima's "Onuba" dance club, for a series of retrospective 25th anniversary concerts in multiple Peruvian cities in 2011, coinciding with the release of a vinyl edition of Primera Dosis, and for a single show in mid-2013, and alongside more than a dozen other classic Peruvian rock and punk bands at the "Revolución Caliente" music festival in Peru's National Stadium in Lima, on October 25, 2014.

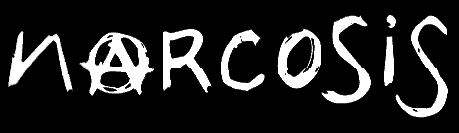

== Members ==
=== Final ===
- Luis "Wicho" García – vocals, production
- Jorge "Pelo parao" Madueño – drums
- Fernando "Cachorro" Vial – guitar (Vial died on 24 October 2020)

=== Former ===
- Luis Piccini – drums (1984)
- Alvaro Carrillo "Gallito" – vocals (1984)

== Discography ==
- 1985 – Primera Dosis, self-produced cassette album
- 1986 – Acto de Magia, self-produced cassette album
- 2003 – Narcosis, a retrospective CD produced on Fernando Vial's Pasajeros del Horror label.
- 2011 – Primera Dosis release on vinyl disc
