= Los Saicos =

Peruvian rock band

Background information
- Origin: Lince, Lima, Peru
- Genres: Proto-punk; garage rock; Latin beat; surf
- Years active: 1964–1966, 2006–2011, 2013–present
- Labels: DisPerú, El Virrey, Electro Harmonix, Repsycheld Records, DINSA, MCA
- Members: Erwin Flores; Rolando "El Chino" Carpio; César "Papi" Castrillón; Francisco "Pancho" Guevara

Los Saicos is a rock band formed in 1964 in Lima, Peru. Their use of fast tempos, screamed vocals and aggressive riffing has led publications to retrospectively credit them as pioneers of punk rock music.

During the mid-to late 1960s, Los Saicos became one of the most successful groups to come out of Peru, fashioning a unique surf-influenced garage rock sound. In addition to composing their own songs, written by band members Erwin Flores and Rolando Carpio, they are sometimes mentioned as the first South American band to exclusively record their own material.

They released six singles between 1965 and 1966, with their most notable being "Demolición" which later became widely recognized as well as an anthem in Peruvian rock music. Though they broke up in 1966, Los Saicos re-united in 2006 remaining active until the present day.

== History ==
=== 1960s ===
The band was formed in the middle class Lince district of Lima in 1964 by guitarist and vocalist, Erwin Flores and drummer, Francisco Guevara, who were just out of high school. They asked Roland "El Chino" Carpio, previously of the group Los Steivos to join them on lead guitar and also invited César "Papi" Castrillón, whom they taught to play bass. The band attempted to find a lead singer, and they auditioned several, but none proved satisfactory. So, they decided to have Erwin Flores and "Papi" Castrillón swap on lead vocals, with Flores singing the more rocking numbers in his rough, guttural voice and Castrillón handling the more melodic songs. Initially the name of their band was "Los Sádicos" (The Sadists), however, perhaps to avoid being banned for suggesting sadism, they dropped the letter "d" from the name, resulting in "Los Saicos." They liked the way the new name suggested not only the popular battery-powered Seiko watch, but also the title of the famous Alfred Hitchcock thriller, Psycho.

The band began by playing mostly local venues. On one occasion they played to a packed crowd as one of the acts on the bill of a show being held at the Tauro Cinema, in which they caught the attention of some of the numerous journalists and music industry executives attending the Association of Music Journalists in Peru, being held at that time in Lima, who were present. They were detained several times by the police, mostly for speeding but also for taking a sledgehammer, axe and fake TNT to the railway station for a record cover photo shoot. In early 1965, they appeared on the popular TV Show, El Show del Diana on Channel 9. They were chosen as "best of the week" and received a recording contract with the DisPerú label. The first single that they released for the label featured the songs, "Come On" and "Ana."

The single became a big hit in Peru. Later in 1965, they released the single, "Demolición," which became one of the biggest radio hits on the national charts that year. The song featured humorously anarchistic lyrics celebrating the demolition of a railway station. Los Saicos, released three more singles for the DisPerú label. In 1966, they signed to the larger IEMPSA label and cut one single, "Besando a Otra" / "Intensamente."

However, as their popularity began to wane in 1966, and exhausted from the pressures of constant activity, they decided to break up. Their members went on to pursue more conventional careers. Singer/rhythm guitarist, Erwin Flores and singer/bass player César "Papi" Castrillón, eventually moved to the United States. Flores recorded two solo albums that were later shelved. He then moved to the Washington, DC area where he got a degree in Physics and worked for a number of years with the National Aeronautics and Space Administration (NASA), sometimes moonlighting as a salsa singer for a Latin cover band in Maryland and Virginia. He is currently an executive for a pharmaceutical company. Coincidentally, Castrillón was living near Flores and they both became aware of their proximity after a few years. Castrillón is semi-retired and has taught occasional guitar classes at his church.

Guitar player Rolando Carpio, who died in early 2005, had made a point of not telling his children about his musical past until they discovered the fact by themselves. Drummer Pancho Guevara died in May 2015, in Lima.

== Reunion ==
In 1999, Spanish record label Electro Harmonix reissued the recordings of Los Saicos for the first time after being exposed to the band's music by Peruvian record collector and researcher Paul Hurtado de Mendoza. The compilation was pressed on a 10" vinyl record that was distributed worldwide, reaching a new audience that was soon fascinated by the punk pioneers efforts in 1965 Peru.

In 2006, the surviving Saicos got together in their hometown, Lince, Lima, for some commemorative events. They apparently had not played together in public since 1966. Erwin Flores made a public reappearance in Peru after 40 years, singing "Demolición" at a small concert with the garage band Manganzoides as a guest, in May 2006. He also performed that song in Madrid at the Joy Eslava Club, fronting Spanish band Wau y Los Arrghs! in 2009. In 2010 Los Saicos played on their first international concert ever at Spain, since the ABC newspaper called them 'the first punk band in the world'.

In 2011, Saicomania, a documentary about the band's career, was released at the Julieta theatre, Miraflores, Lima, Perú. On the same day, Los Saicos played together, with the presence of the local psychedelic garage band Los Silver Mornings. The documentary was later shown in public in San Francisco, with, among others, Jello Biafra from the Dead Kennedys in attendance. Los Saicos later played 2 other reunion shows in Buenos Aires, Argentina.

In 2022, César "Papi" Castrillón toured the United States and Mexico as Papi Saicos, performing the songs of Los Saicos with Mexico City/Seattle punk group Mala Suerte as his backing band. That year, the band headlined Freakout Festival in Seattle, MonkeyBee Festival III in Mexico City, and Psyched! Fest in San Francisco. The Black Lips appeared onstage with Castrillón for a rendition of "Demolición" at MonkeyBee Festival III.

== Legacy ==
Their entire recorded output has been officially reissued by Spanish label Munster Records on several formats, managing Los Saicos recordings worldwide as exclusive and dealing with licensing and synch requests since 2012.

Psychedelic garage punk band, The Black Lips have acknowledged Los Saicos as a major influence.

In Lima, on May 26, 2006, the band members received a Civic Medal for their contributions to music; a plaque was dedicated to their name. In addition to their considerable success in Peru during their heyday the 60s, in more recent years they have become recognized as pioneers in protopunk. Their sound and lyrical approach anticipated aspects of the later punk movement of the 70s. Although they were apparently unaware of US garage rock or obscure British bands such as the Downliners Sect, in many ways their story parallels that of 60s bands such as The Sonics and The Standells, as well as other groups in North America. As in North America, the success of The Beatles unleashed a wave of bands in Peru, which resulted in what some have called the "Golden Age" of Peruvian Rock." In this context Los Saicos played a major role.

== Discography ==
Albums

- Wild Teen-Punk From Peru 1965 (1999) - by Spanish label Electro Harmonix
- Saicos (2006) - by Repsychled Records
- ¡Demolición! - The Complete Recordings (2010) - by Munster Records
- Los Saicos [boxset] (2022) - by Munster Records

Singles

- "Come On" / "Ana" (March 1965) - Dis Perú
- "Demolición" / "Lonely Star" (May 1965) - Dis Perú
- "Camisa de fuerza" / "Cementerio" (1965) - Dis Perú
- "Te Amo" / "Fugitivo de Alcatraz" (October 1965) - Dis Perú
- "Salvaje" / "El Entierro de Los Gatos" (1965) - Dis Perú
- "Besando a Otra" / "Intensamente" (1966) - El Virrey
- "El Mercenario" / "Un Poquito de Cariño" (1969) - Dinsa
- "Viejo y Enfermo" / "Tu Nombre En La Arena" (2016) - MCA Studies (Mexico)
- "La Casa de Arroz" / "El Mercenario (Radio Edit)" (2016) - MCA Studies (Mexico)

== Band members ==
=== 1964–1966 ===
- Erwin Flores (lead vocals, rhythm guitar)
- Rolando "El Chino" Carpio (lead guitar)
- César "Papi" Castrillón (bass guitar, vocals)
- Pancho Guevara (drums, vocals)

== See also ==
- Latino punk
- Traffic Sound
