= Mar de Copas =

Background information
- Origin: Lima, Peru
- Genres: Alternative rock
- Years active: 1992–present
- Labels: Mar de Copas Productions S.A.
- Members: Luis Donaldo García Hildebrandt; José Manuel Barrios de la Puente; Phoebe Naufsika Condos; Eduardo José Leverone; César Zamalloa Diez Canseco
- Past members: Gerardo Cristobal; Jorge de Tramontana; Rocío Madueño; Christian Molina; Francisco “Pancho" Rodriguez; Claudia Salem; Felix Torrealva
- Website: Official Website

Mar de Copas is a Peruvian alternative rock band from Lima. They emerged from the South American independent music scene of the 1990s.

Mar de Copas sold over 50,000 copies of their first four albums in Peru, where an album with 5,000 copies sold is considered a "Disco de Oro" (Best-seller music award). No other Peruvian band has done the same. They are influenced by American and Spanish songwriters from the 1960s and 1980s, including music periods from La Nueva Ola and Alternative Rock.

== History ==
José Manuel Barrios

Mar de Copas was founded by Manuel Barrios (guitar and vocals) and Eduardo Leverone (drums) in 1992, after splitting up their band Los Inocentes. Barrios and Leverone have confirmed they are heavily influenced by Nino Bravo, Manolo Galván, Los Secretos, El Ultimo de la Fila, Pistones, The Smiths, R.E.M., The Church, James, Elvis Presley and Carlos Gardel.

They worked with fellow musicians Miki González and Felix Torrealva on their first album under the name "As de Copas". They invited their close friends Claudia Salem and Phoebe Condos to sing backing vocals for the first seven songs they wrote. Luis "Wicho" García, who at the time worked as the sound engineer at the recording studio of Miki Gonzáles promised to sing the remaining songs and remain as their lead singer. García was part of Narcosis with Jorge "Pelo" Madueño and Fernando "Cachorro" Vial. García also played an important role in other projects for Miki Gonzáles such as La Banda Azul. By 1993, Barrios and Leverone finished writing 12 songs, and changed the name of the band to "Mar de Copas". The band signed a contract with El Virrey record company to initially make 300 cassette copies for them. Their first album was named "Mar de Copas". Songs like "Fugitivo" and "Canción" were inspired in trips they made to Punta Sal and Tarma respectively. Rodrigo Quijano wrote the song "Canción" which is considered their most notable trova song. Barrios and Leverone wrote melodies based on country music in "Recompensa" and "Héroe del delito". "Faena" is attributed to bullfighting and "Mujer Noche", their signature song, was chosen for their first music video. In August 1993, the band played live for the first time at the Phantom Pub in Lima.

In 1994, El Virrey changed their name to Eureka Records. Felix Torrealva left the band and Cesar Zamalloa became the new bass player. Zamalloa played for Orgus, Cimarrones, Oblivium, and formed his own metal band called Ultramotor. After Zamalloa joined the band, Mar de Copas finished writing and editing 12 new songs between October and November in 1994. The album Entre los Arboles was finalized and recorded in chronologic order when the songs were written. By local success, their first two albums Mar de Copas and Entre los Arboles, were sold in CD format. Songs like "Entre los Arboles" and "Tras Esa Puerta" have become their best feats impossible to replicate in their latest albums. Miki Gonzalez played the lead guitar on "Aqui en el borde del mar", Phoebe wrote the lyrics in "Blu Ice", and Barrios sang the full song "Morir un poco", attempting to duplicate his success in "Una Historia Mas" as done on the first album. After the album was finished, each member started alternate music projects that lasted until 1997. Mar de Copas has been called a depressive band due to their lyrics such as "El dolor después del amor / vuélvete a morir / no sé si ese cuerpo que cayó fui yo al morir, / enamorado de la soledad". Barrios has stated that his songs were written at the worst times in his life and that recording albums is a natural process.

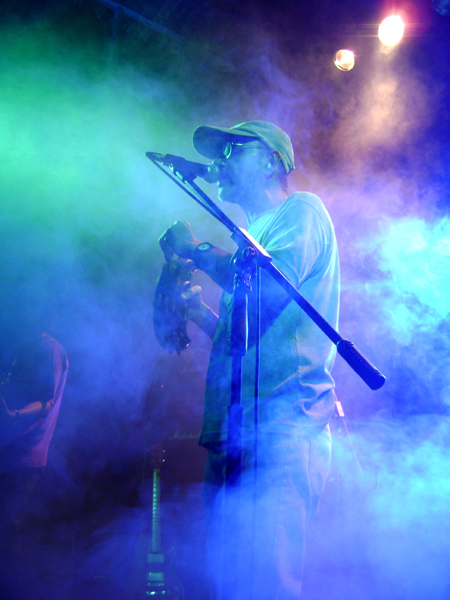
Luis García a.k.a. "Wicho"

Mar de Copas created their recording studio Villa Ruby and independent label Mar de Copas Productions S.A. In mid-1997, the band released their third album, III. The songs "C.P.A.M" and "L.B.", "Carta para amigos muertos" ("Letter for My Dead Friends"), and "Luis Barrios" (Manuel Barrios' brother), were the starting point for their recognition as "Banda de Culto" ("Cult band") in Perú. The band made the slang "caleta" commonly used in concerts by their fans when requesting songs that weren't part of their regular set list. "III" had no accompanying single. Barrios and Leverone wrote a song based on the Mexican Bolero called "Ni para rogar un beso" and their first vals "A Dios". "De tierra" is a song based on social issues from the 1990s and it became the name of their first recorded live concert at the Teatro Peruano Japonés years later. "L.B.", "Vaquera", and "Despedida" were included on the movie soundtrack of "No se lo digas a nadie". Despedida is considered one of their darkest songs as it relates to suicide and depression.

In 1998, the band re-released their first two albums with bonus tracks including songs like "Con el mar" (written by Zamalloa). In 1999, Mar de Copas released their fourth album Suna and three music videos. By then, they have influenced and produced for many bands in Lima such as Libido, Campo de Almas, TK, Dolores Delirio, Indigo, Cementerio Club, Wayo, Voz Propia, Daniel F, Zen and Los Hnos. Brother's. Their sound and lyrics evolved with the addition of new genres. For example, songs like "Samba" were inspired by Argentinean music. The song "Adios Amor" had inspiration from the war between Peru and Chile. The theme is about a Peruvian soldier who departed for the war on his wedding night and died in the battle of Tacna. "Adios Amor" became one of the favorite songs for radio stations in 1999. Mar de Copas had four hit singles that year. The band also recorded two Italian ballads: "Serenata" and "Desconcierto".

Eduardo Leverone

In 2000, Mar de Copas was the first local band to play at the "Gran Estelar de la Feria del Hogar", a festival that featured only international artists until that year. In 2001, the band moved to another studio in San Antonio Miraflores, Villa Ruby II. They had an active concert schedule for a year. In 2002, Mar de Copas released their first live double album "En Vivo". In November, Mar de Copas recorded a media album Ramera, which includes their four videos, an electric version of a song titled "Ramera", a demo song by Barrios titled "Cancion que dejo de andar", and four acoustic songs.

In 2004, Mar de Copas released Si algo asi como el amor esta en el aire and a month later presented the album live at El Parque de la Exposición. They received another "Disco de Oro" and had four number one songs: "Si algo asi como el amor esta en el aire", "Balada de un encuentro fugaz", "Perdido" and "Llevame". In October, the band recorded the first DVD Peruvian production De Tierra at the Teatro Peruano Japones. Mar de Copas edited these songs for their then-upcoming album De Tierra with acoustic songs and three unreleased demos: "Cada vez", "Vacio", and "Luis". In 2005, the DVD was released which includes the concert, rare footage of the band, videos, demos, and interviews of the band. By the end of the year, Mar de Copas made the soundtrack of "Un dia sin sexo" directed by Frank Pérez-Garland. In 2006, Claudia Salem left the band.

By the end of 2008, Mar de Copas played in Buenos Aires, Argentina at Centro Cultural Buen Ayre. In 2013 and after 9 years of their last album, the band released 2 albums, "Seis" and "Lado B". Seis features 12 songs and 2 new videos for "Siglo XX" and "Atardecer". The video for Atardecer was recorded with clip from fans and friends in the concert celebrating the release for their album at Embarcadero 41 in Barranco. It is also their first album to be available for purchase in iTunes. Lado B contains songs from movies, plays, and acoustic covers played in the last decade and recorded with electric guitars. Most of these songs were played in concerts "a capella" so they promised new versions to their fans. Covers included are "No Me Imagino" by Los Secretos and "Estación" by Sui Generis.

Since then, Mar de Copas is often the headliner of major rock concerts in Lima. They are the local band with most official album sales in Perú where piracy has increased since the 1990s. Mar de Copas plays a concert once a month at La Noche Bar in Barranco which considered today their home venue.

== Members ==
César Zamalloa

Current Members

- Manuel "Manolo" Barrios - lead guitar and vocals
- Luis "Wicho" García - vocals
- Phoebe Condos - keyboards and backing vocals
- Eduardo "Toto" Leverone - drums
- César Zamalloa - bass

Former members

- Claudia Salem (1993–2005) - backing vocals and tambourine
- Felix Torrealva (1993–1994) - bass

Guest musicians

- Miki González - guitar on "Aquí en el borde del mar" and harmonica on "Dulce y veloz"
- Victor "El Gato" Villavicencio - piano and keyboards on "Prison" and "Cancion"
- Miguel Navarro - English horn on "Cuenta la historia"

== Discography ==
- Mar de copas - 1993
- Entre los arboles - 1994
- III - 1997
- Suna - 1999
- 12 grandes exitos - 2000
- En vivo (double disc) - 2002
- Ramera (multimedia album) - 2002
- Si algo asi como el amor esta en el aire - 2004
- 12 canciones - 2004
- De tierra - 2004
- De tierra (DVD) - 2005
- Todos los singles 2011
- Seis - 2014
- Lado B - 2014

== Videography ==
Phoebe Condos

- "Mujer noche" is the first official video made by the original members, including former bassist Felix Torrealva. The second version of the song was recorded in 1998, especially to fit the video. The video has scenes from a concert at "La Pontificia Universidad Catolica del Peru" in 1993. "Mujer noche" was originally written and sung by Barrios. Hugo Martinez was director the video, while Giancarlo Paz was editor and Patricia Salazar was the visual arts manager.
- "Enloqueciendo", the second official video, was made as a 16 mm film. The video features cities and locations in northern Lima and Barranco. The script was written, directed, edited, and produced by Rafael Besaccia.
- The third official video, "Suna", features animated drawings. All the pictures are made by Rafael Besaccia with paint and brush on paper. The animations are based on classic techniques and visual poetry from the 20th century. Barrios states that "Suna" is an angel, and that the viewer will be able to follow and interpret the first person story throughout the video. At the end, there is an acoustic version of the song that was the suggested version of "Suna", but the band decided to add it as the ending of the song.
- "El rumbo del mar", the fourth official video contains pictures and recordings created since 1992. It portrays how the band has changed over the years and how they started. Some of the scenes are live concerts in "La Feria del Hogar", "La Noche Pub", and "La Estacion" in Barranco; there is also footage depicting the entrance to Villa Ruby, live recordings, and fans of the band. The video was produced and edited by Gerardo Cristobal.

"Mar de Copas" in the making of the video-Un día sin Sexo

- "Un dia sin sexo" is the fifth official Mar de Copas video. It was made for a Peruvian film of the same name. The video features clips from the movie and former member Claudia Salem before she left the band. The song was number one for seven weeks for the Peruvian radio station Studio 92. The theme of the video is to portrait the band on a distinctive red theater with bright lights on the background. The video was produced and directed by Frank Perez-Garland.
- The "De tierra" DVD is the first Peruvian DVD production, released in 2005. The DVD features a live unplugged concert played in 2004 with 17 songs that are not part of the band's usual concert lists. The DVD also has previously unreleased material of the band, including interviews, T.V. appearances, and other concerts.

== Related projects ==
- No Name was a Beatles tribute band formed in 1981 by Luis Garcia, Mario Gomez, Joseph Newell, Daniel Padilla, and Coco Mariazza.
- Narcosis was a punk band that lasted eight months and was formed in 1984 by Luis Garcia, Jorge Madueño, and Cachorro Vial. Narcosis recorded their only album, Primera Dosis, in 1985.
- La Banda Azul was a pop rock band formed in 1986 by Luis Garcia, Miguel "Coyote" Denegri, Edgar Cuentas, Augusto Castro, and Manuel Garrido-Lecca. They recorded one album, Cuestion de Lugar in 1987.
- Los Inocentes was a band formed in 1987 by Manuel Barrios, Gustavo Jimenez "La Planta", Arturo Rivas, and Toto Leverone.
- Orgus was a heavy metal band which lasted until 1990 and which featured Cesar Zamalloa as guitarist. The band was awarded second place for a music challenge between 120 local bands made by the Esquina magazine.
- Cimarrones was a rock band formed in 1990 by Daniel Flores, Constantino Alvarez, Cesar Zamalloa, and Chevo Ballumbrosio.

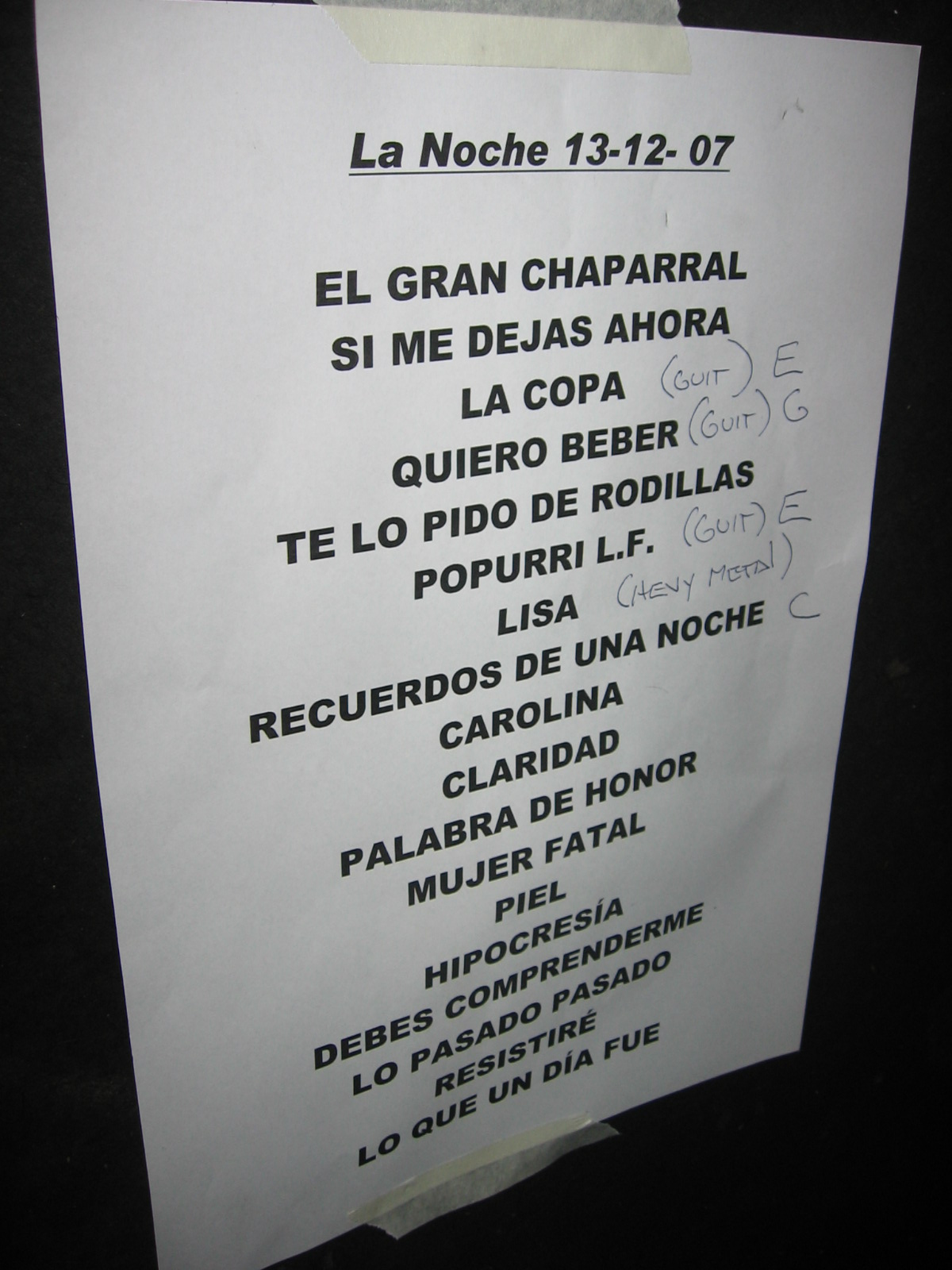
Los Trece Baladas: Set List

- El Aire was a rock band formed in 1996 by Jose Javier Castro on lead guitar and vocals, Cesar Zamalloa on bass, Manuel Barrios on guitar, and Constantino Alvarez on drums. Other artists that have helped the band include Luis Sanguinetti, Adrian Arguedas, Gonzalo Farfan, Carlos Criminal, Crinsom Sinclair, and Armando Andrade. The band has played with Mouse on Mars on May 16, 2008.
- Circo Ficcion was formed in 1996 by Cesar Zamalloa on bass, Ramon Perez-Prieto on guitar and vocals, Jorge de Tramontana on lead guitar, Constantino Alvarez on drums, and Grimaldo del Solar on guitar. This band recorded one album.
- In 1997, Avispon Verde was formed by Rafael Morales on keyboards, guitar, and vocals; Pierpa de Bernardi on drums; and Cesar Zamalloa on bass. This band had one album recorded.
- Los Trece Baladas was a cover band formed in 1998 by Manuel Barrios on guitar and vocals, Toto Leverone on drums, Cesar Zamalloa on bass, Abel "Capitan Pomada" Salcedo on guitar, and Jorge de Tramontana on lead guitar. Los Trece Baladas arranged covers of "La nueva ola" and they have gained international recognition from their albums Lo que un dia fue no sera and Volume 2. Some of the artists they covered include Nino Bravo, José José, Leonardo Favio, José Feliciano, Camilo Sesto, Nicola Di Bari, Juan Gabriel, Manolo Galvan, and Los Iracundos, among others.
- Los Hnos. Brother's was a hard rock band formed in 1999 by Cesar Zamalloa on bass, Eduardo Chaparro on vocals, Jorge de Tramontana on lead guitar, and Hector Quintanilla on drums.
- Ultramotor is a hardcore formed in 2001 by Cesar Zamalloa on guitar, Constantino Alvarez on drums, and Alfonso Montesinos on bass.
- Luis Garcia & Fernando Chirinos is a duo that sings and plays acoustic songs A cappella of Los Secretos, Antonio Vega, Pistones, Duncan Dhu, Gabinete Caligari, Nacha Pop, La Granja, Metadona, Narcosis, Enrique Urquijo y Los Problemas, El Ultimo de la Fila, Mama, Los Bolidos, 12 Garras, and Radio Futura.

== Soundtracks ==
- The 1998 Peruvian/Spanish movie "No se lo digas a nadie", directed by Francisco J. Lombardi, featured three Mar de Copas songs: "LB", "Vaquera", and "Despedida". The accompanying novel was written by Jaime Bayly and produced by Andres Vicente Gomez.
- The 2001 Peruvian/German movie "Y si te vi, no me acuerdo", directed by Miguel Barreda Delgado and produced by Stefan Kaspar, had 57 songs written and recorded by Luis Garcia.
- The 2001 Peruvian movie "Bala perdida", directed by Aldo Salvini and produced by Iguana Productions, had 36 original songs by Manuel Barrios and two by Luis García; García edited the songs a year later.
- The 2005 Peruvian movie "Un día sin sexo", directed by Frank Perez-Garland and produced by Fabrizio Aguilar, had five Mar de Copas songs, four of which were unreleased: "Viejo amor, nuevo amor", "Lisa en el espejo", "Llévame", "Falso amor", and "Un día sin sexo".
