= Mr. Brownstone =

Single by Guns N' Roses

from the album Appetite for Destruction
- A-side: "Welcome to the Jungle (US): It's So Easy (UK)"
- Released: June 8, 1987
- Recorded: 1987
- Genre: Hard rock
- Length: 3:46
- Label: Geffen
- Songwriter: Izzy Stradlin · Slash
- Producer: Mike Clink

Guns N' Roses singles chronology
"Mr. Brownstone" and "It's So Easy" (1987)	"Welcome to the Jungle" (1987)

"Mr. Brownstone" is a hard rock song by the American hard rock band Guns N' Roses, featured on their debut studio album, Appetite for Destruction (1987). Lead and rhythm guitarists Slash and Izzy Stradlin wrote the song in Stradlin's apartment while lamenting their addictions to heroin, for which "Brownstone" is a slang term.

== Composition ==
The lyrics are a distinct reference to drug tolerance that heroin usage causes: "I used to do a little, but a little wouldn't do it, so the little got more and more." They wrote the lyrics on the back of a grocery bag and then brought it to singer Axl Rose. Slash said the lyrics described a typical day in the life of him and Stradlin. It was the first song the band wrote after being signed by Geffen Records.

== Single release ==
"Mr. Brownstone" was the first Guns N' Roses single released outside of the United States and appeared as the A-side of "It's So Easy" in the United Kingdom. In the US, it was used as the B-side of "Welcome to the Jungle".

== Controversy ==
Seung-Hui Cho, the perpetrator of the Virginia Tech shooting, wrote a play titled "Mr. Brownstone" that took inspiration from the song's lyrics. The song "Shackler's Revenge" from the band's 2008 album Chinese Democracy was written in reaction to "the insanity of senseless school shootings and also the media trying desperately to make more out of one shooter's preference for the Guns song Brownstone to no avail."

== Certifications ==
Region	Certification	Certified units/sales
New Zealand (RMNZ)	Gold	15,000^{‡}
^{‡} Sales+streaming figures based on certification alone.
