= Theremyn 4 =

Theremyn_4
- Origin: Lima, Peru
- Genres: Electronic, IDM, techno, ambient, synthpop
- Years active: 2000–present
- Labels: Independent, Factoría Autor, Phantom Records
- Members: José Gallo
- Website: theremyn4.com

Theremyn_4 is a Peruvian electronic music project founded in 2000 by producer and musician José Gallo. Known for blending IDM, techno, ambient, and experimental sounds, the group has released multiple albums and performed at international festivals. They are considered one of the pioneering acts in Peru’s electronic music scene.

== History ==
Theremyn_4 was formed in Lima in 2000 by José Gallo, who sought to create an electronic project influenced by European and Japanese electronic music. Their debut album, Fluorescence (2000), introduced their experimental style, followed by Permafrost (2001).

The band gained wider recognition with Lima/Tokyo/Lima (2007), praised by Peruvian media for its fusion of IDM and techno elements. Subsequent albums such as Fiction Beats (2011) and Lost Moments (2014) consolidated their reputation, earning nominations at the Premios Luces organized by El Comercio.

== Performances ==
Theremyn_4 has performed at major festivals including Creamfields Lima, Pop Montreal (Canada), and Electrosono (Mexico). They have shared the stage with international acts such as Peter Hook, Alan Wilder (Recoil), and Cut Copy.

In 2023, José Gallo performed in Paris at a showcase organized by Radio France International, highlighting the band’s international reach.

== Awards and recognition ==
- Winner, Electronic category – John Lennon Songwriting Contest (2010)
- Nominee, Best Electronic Album – Independent Music Awards (2012)
- Nominee, Best Electronic Album – Premios Luces (El Comercio, 2011 and 2014)

== Discography ==
=== Studio albums ===
- Fluorescente verde en el patio (2000) – debut album, experimental IDM textures.
- Mi vida en infrarrojo (2001) – ambient/electronic explorations.
- Lima/Tokyo/Lima (2004) – breakthrough record, blending IDM, drum’n’bass, and techno.
- Spacetimebomb (2006) – futuristic, techno‑driven soundscapes.
- Inflamable (2009) – aggressive beats, electro‑rock influences.
- Fiction Beats (2011) – nominated for *Premios Luces*; synthpop and dance elements.
- The Next Wave (2014) – acclaimed as one of the best Peruvian albums of 2014.
- Lost Moments (2018) – introspective, cinematic electronic textures.
- Art, Noise + Speed (2023) – latest studio release, continuing their experimental trajectory.

=== Remix albums ===
- Peruvian Remixing Co. (2004) – remix album showcasing collaborations.
- Remixed Moments (2019) – reinterpretations of Lost Moments.
- Fluorescente verde en el patio REMIXES (2020) – anniversary remix project.

=== Re‑editions ===
- Fluorescente verde en el patio 20‑A (2020) – anniversary edition.
- Mi vida en infrarrojo 20‑A (2021) – remastered reissue.
- Lima/Tokyo/Lima 20‑A (2024) – expanded vinyl edition with new collaborations.

=== Singles and EPs ===
- Walking with You (2018)
- Carmín Ciclón 2020 (2020)
- Nazca Cowboy (2021)
- Art Stealers (2022)
- Supertrain 74‑24’ (2024)
- La Guarida Live Session (2025)
- El Escapista (2026)
