= Amen (Peruvian band) =

Peruvian rock band

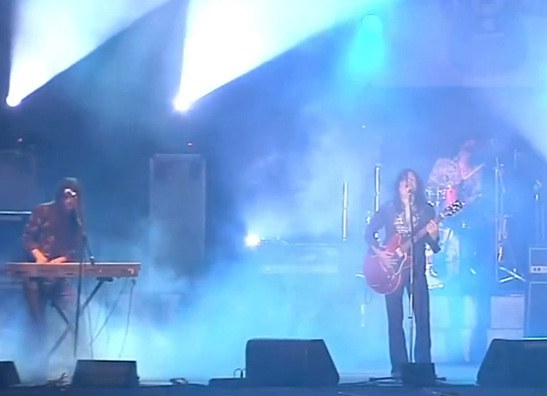
- Amen national band at Acustirock II

Background information
- Origin: Lima, Peru
- Genres: Blues rock, hard rock, rock and roll
- Years active: 1995–present
- Members: Marcello Motta; Henry Ueunten; Nathan Chara; Manuel Chávez
- Website: www.amen.pe

Amen is a rock band from Lima, Peru. In 2001, Amen started earning local fame through their song "Decir Adios" (Say Goodbye). The band participates in numerous big national performances in Peru. Amen and its vocalist Marcello Motta have won several contests and the Peruvian Association of Authors and Composers (APDAYC) music award.

== History ==
In 1995, Marcello Motta, Steve Suárez, and Renán Díaz had their first gig as a band in a festival organized in the Peruvian district of Ventanilla, where they live.

In 1997, Amen took part in two contests of new rock bands. The first one, organized by the Peruvian record label Discos Hispanos, had an award of a CD recording and an artistic contract for 10 years. The second contest was organized by Channel 9 and had the award of a music video production. Amen won both contests.

At the end of 1997, Amen recorded their first album, entitled Libre, containing twelve songs. Henry Ueunten recorded the keyboard portion of this album, which marked the beginning of his integration into Amen.

In December 2004, the band released their second album, named Amen. This album contains twelve songs, eleven composed by Marcello Motta and one composed by Freddy Velarde, Motta's uncle.

In December 2008, Amen released their third album, Tiempos de resurrección, containing thirteen songs and two bonus tracks. The first single of the album, La chata, reached the top of Peru's national record charts. The second promotional single was "Violar las leyes" (To violate the laws). Amen made a video for this track directed by Percy Céspedez.

== Band members ==
- Marcello Motta: vocals, guitar
- Henry Ueunten: keyboards
- Nathan Chara: bass
- Manuel Chávez: drums

== Discography ==
- Libre (1997)
- Amen (2004)
- Tiempos de resurrección (2008)
- Somos la gente, somos uno (2015)
- Somos la gente, somos dos (2015)
- Esto es guerra de titanes (2015)
- Infectado (2017)
