= Cementerio Club =

Peruvian alternative rock band

- Origin: Lima, Peru
- Genres: Alternative Rock, Indie Rock
- Years active: 1996–present
- Members: Jose Arbulú, Pedro Solano, Ricardo Solís, Luis Callirgos
- Past members: Caroline Cruz, Rocío Madueño

Cementerio Club is a Peruvian alternative rock band formed in 1996. In 1999 MTV began to play their videoclip of the song "Barco Viejo" and in 2001 MTV played another video of theirs called "Sometimes Bonita". In 2004, Cementerio Club was nominated for the "Best New Central Artist" category at the MTV Video Music Awards Latin America for their video "Inmortales", and won it. That same year, their album "Cementerio Aclubstico ¿Aún Crees En La Magia?" won "Album Of The Year" at MTV. Their bassist/guitar and leader José Arbulú has also released his debut album as a solo career called "Libres", the lead guitar Pedro Solano also has releases his debut album as a solo career called "+ Amor.

== Members ==
- José Arbulú (vocals, (Bass, Guitar)
- Pedro Solano (vocals, Lead Guitar)
- Ricardo Solís (Guitar)
- Luis Callirgos (drums)

== Discography ==
- Cementerio Club (1997)
- Cerca (2000)
- Canciones Desnudas Para Iluminar Los Cuerpos (2001)
- Vacaciones En Mediocielo (2003)
- Cementerio Aclubstico ¿Aun Crees En La Magia? (2004)
- Bailando En El Muladar (2007)
- Tiempo (2015)

== Singles ==
- Underground
- Barco viejo
- Tal vez mañana
- Ella va
- Sometimes bonita
- El mago
- Jade
- Inmortales
- Esfera de cristal
- Crepúsculo
- Hotel Apocalipsis
- No puedo esperar
- Ya no me pones
