= Los Mojarras =

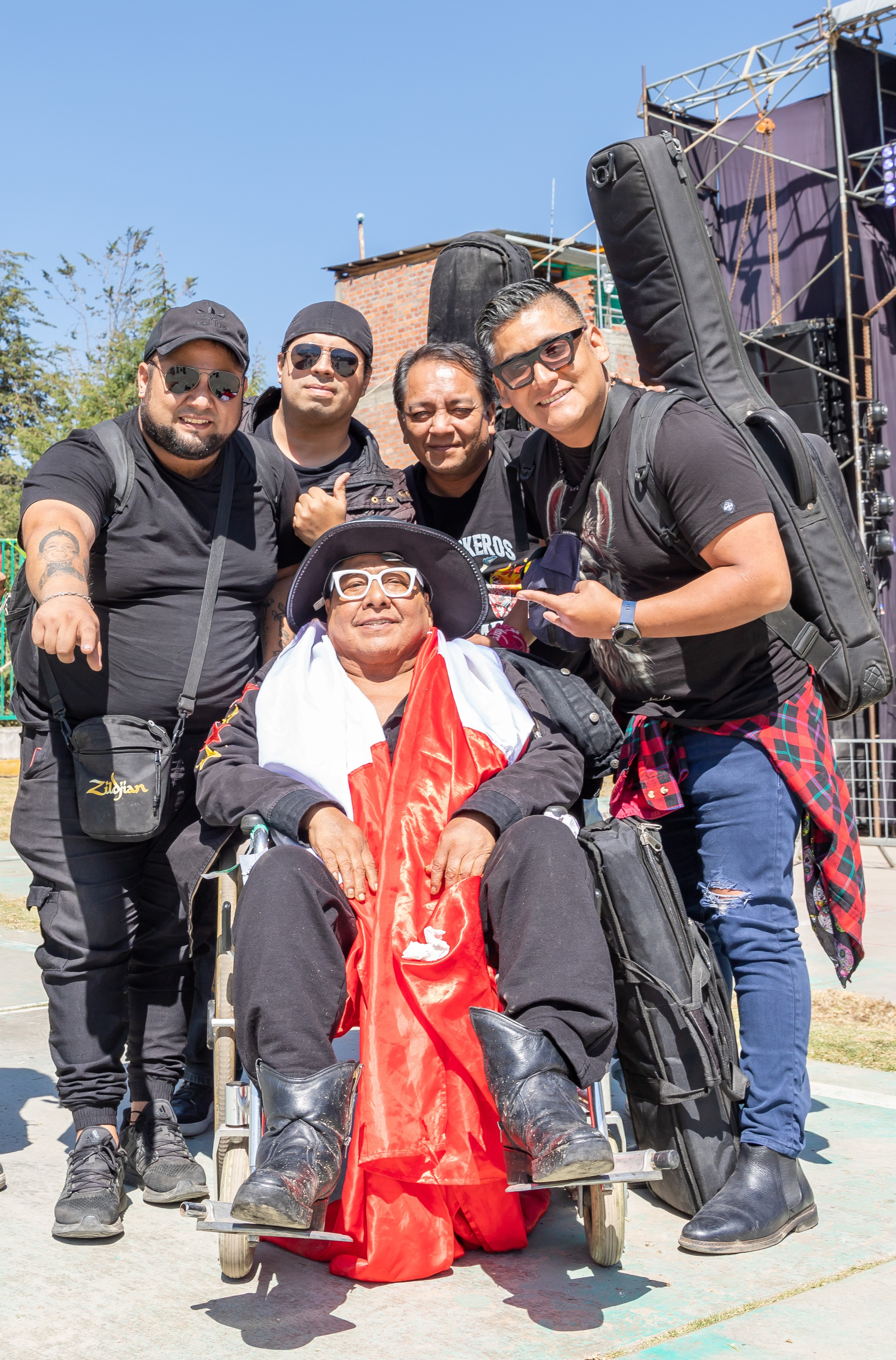
Los Mojarras in Quechua Fest 2026

Los Mojarras are a band from the province of El Agustino Lima Peru that formed in 1992. They released their first album in the same year, titled Sarita Colonia, and are still currently producing music and performing. Link label They have been politically active through their music, voicing political realities and views. Their music is referred to as Peruvian rock, however Luis A. Ramos-Garcia, a professor and researcher of Latin American theater and popular music from the University of Minnesota, describes their music as a "mixture of Chicha or Peruvian cumbia, Andean Cumbia, and Afro-Peruvian styling’s". Their style of music also includes blends of rock music. Critically analyzed, the music of Los Mojarras, can be thought of as a form of transculturation, in which the emergence of mixed cultures are expressed through the mixture of musical rhythms. This type of music can also be described a form of cultural hybridity, in which the music and its scene has become a new cultural production raised out of multiple existing cultures or shared meanings. As Jesus-Martin Barbero, a researcher and philosopher, who's disciplined in Cultural Studies; has stated "music is the result of mestizaje, the profane deformation of an authentic form." Link label Appropriated in musical terms, mestizaje can refer to the mixtures of different music produced as a response to the formations of new social identities; and in the search of belonging by new generations of Andean migrants in capital cities. This mixture of music has primarily been played by the "decedents of migrant Andeans, who grew up and/or were born in major cities such as Lima, in Peru". These migrants come from rural areas in Peru, moving to modernized cities often forced because of economic circumstances, exemplifying a form of local diasporic mobility. Los Mojarras lyrics range from the issues of societal displacement, dislocation of Andean migrants in major cities and working class migrant experiences and issues. Their music genre became recognized as a form of "new musical subjectivity by marginalized Urban-Andeans", that were expressing for the first time, within chicha music that has primarily been about love or romance; anger, agency, political issues and concerns. Los Mojarras created a space for people living within the marginalized sectors of Peru. These artists also brought “ attention to the problems situated within the hegemonic Creole-Spanish model maintained by privileged classes”, and narrating through music the conflicts between Limeños and Andean migrants, that arise within the city of Lima.

== Nostalgia Provinciana ==
The song “Nostalgia Provinciana” gives a perfect example of the cultural hybridity that was created through the migration of Andean migrants to Lima, Peru. Through both its lyrics and the imagery portrayed in the music video we can see the representations of cultural hybridity, as well as societal displacement and dislocation previously mentioned.

Music Video: Link label

There is a reoccurring image of an indigenous man, dressed as the European representation of Jesus Christ on the crucifix recognizing or reminding the colonization of the Americas through the introduction of Catholicism and its resulting mestizaje. The cross in which he is attached to, is actually a telephone pole and it is located at the edge of the city looking on as if observing what has happened to both his people and his new home. This can be representative of the re-colonization of indigenous people by the modern societal expectations that follow a Creole-Spanish model that excludes much of the culture of Andean migrants. The video also demonstrates cultural hybridity in the different types of clothing worn by the Andean people in the city, who are wearing modern or contemporary clothing and more traditional indigenous clothing. This shows how, even though the diaspora of the indigenous Andeans are now living in a different environment than their native one and they have adopted many of the hegemonic customs such as more modern fashions, they still pay homage to their roots. An example would be the way they still wear guaraches with contemporary styles of clothing, representing how they are still grounded in their culture and history. The Andean migrants living in Lima have formed a hybrid identity where they are a part of both the city and the rural "province" and a part of neither at the same time; demonstrating a mestiza consciousness.

Ahi se va una generacion de pueblos de migrantes / Que vivieron un mundo diferente/ A las de sus padres a la de nuestros abuelos / Asistieron a colegios con gente de ciudad/ Fusionando sus costumbres Link label

The lyrics of the song mention the process of how Andino migrants through generations of migration adaptation have established a sense of identity, but still struggle in maintaining a sense of belonging. The first verse of the song reveals the displacement through their migrant experiences. People had to leave the more rural areas and move to the city to be able to survive, get an education and find economic opportunities.

== Band members ==
- Hernan Condori "Cachuca" (Vocals, Guitar)
- Felipe Ascárate (Bass)
- Richard Martínez (Lead Guitar)
- Ismael Carhuanina (Drums)
- Cesar tataje (Keyboards)
- Dubber (Percussion)

== Discography ==
- Sarita Colonia (1992)
- Ruidos en la Ciudad (1994)
- Opera Salvaje Para Tribus Urabanas (1995)
- Todos Contra la Pared en Vivo (1998)
- Tour Perrada (1998)
