= Leusemia =

Leuzemia
- Origin: Lima, Peru
- Genres: Punk rock
- Years active: 1983–present
- Members: Daniel F, Kimba Vilis, Raúl Montáñez

Leuzemia is a Peruvian punk rock band. The name of the band is a misspelling of the Spanish word leucemia (meaning leukemia).

== History ==
The band was formed in Lima, Peru in 1983 by Daniel F (guitar, vocals), Kimba Vilis (drums), Raúl Montáñez (guitar). They played simple rock and roll in their early years; because of that they were linked with the punk movement. Leuzemia usually shared stage with other rock bands such as Narcosis, Autopsia, Guerrilla Urbana, and Zcuela Cerrada, that constituted the core of the underground Peruvian rock scene of the early 1980s.

Daniel F left the band shortly after the release of the first LP in 1985. The remaining members played some gigs without him, but finally dissolved the band in 1986.

Kimba Vilis and Raul Montañez kept playing separately. Daniel F released 11 tapes between the years 1986 and 1990. Kúrsiles Romanzas, the most famous of these, was among the most copied tapes of the underground scene at the time.

Ten years after the release of their first album, in 1995, Daniel F, Kimba Vilis and Raul Montañez got together again as Leuzemia to record "A la mierda lo demás, asesinando al mito". In the time Leusemia was absent from the scene, numerous bands were influenced by the music and the attitude of the band, though few of them had seen them live.

Today, Leuzemia continues to be an influential underground rock band in Peru, playing regularly in the same venues they have been playing for more than 25 years.

== Discography ==
- Leuzemia (1985)
- A la mierda lo demás (1995)
- Moxón (1998)
- Yasijah (2000)
- Al final de la calle (2001)
- Hospicios (2004)
