= List of people from Lima =

Coat of Arms of Lima

This is a list of notable people from Lima, Peru. It includes people who were born/raised in, lived in, or spent portions of their lives in Lima, or for whom Lima is a significant part of their identity, as well as music groups founded in Lima. This list is in alphabetical order.

Notable people

=== Artists and designers ===
- Grimanesa Amorós (born 1962), artist and light sculpture installations
- Armando Andrade Tudela (born 1975), artist
- Herman Braun-Vega (1933–2019), painter and artist
- Frederick Cooper Llosa (born 1939), architect and professor
- Federico del Campo (1837–1923), painter
- José Gil de Castro (1785–1840/41), portrait painter, cartographer and soldier who spent many years in Chile
- Fernando de Szyszlo (1925–2017), painter, sculptor, printmaker, and teacher.
- Pancho Fierro (1807/1809–1879), painter.
- Bernardo Fort-Brescia (born 1951), businessman and architect.
- Cristina Gálvez (1916–1982), sculptor.
- Gloria Gómez-Sánchez (1921–2007), artist
- Elena Izcue (1889–1970), illustrator, graphic artist, textile designer
- Daniela Lalita (born 1992), artist, musician and model
- Juan Lepiani (1864–1932), painter
- Felipe Lettersten (1957–2003), artist and sculptor of indigenous tribes and people
- Diego Montoya (born 1982 or 1983), visual artist and fashion designer
- Wynnie Mynerva (born 1993), multidisciplinary artist
- Jorge Piqueras (1925–2020), visual artist
- Luis de Riaño (1596–c. 1667), Cusco School painter
- Joaquín Roca Rey (1923–2004), sculptor
- Javier Tapia (born 1957), artist and painter
- Eduardo Tokeshi (born 1960), artist
- Boris Vallejo (born 1941), painter

=== Religious ===
- Jacinto Barrasa (1626–1704), 17th-century Jesuit preacher and historian
- Saint Martin of Porras (1579–1639), Afro-Peruvian Dominican friar
- Saint Rose of Lima (1586–1617), first Roman Catholic saint born in the Americas

=== Politicians ===
- Carlo Angeles (born 1993), member of Lima metropolitan council, activist
- Fernando Belaúnde (1912–2002), President of Peru (1963–1968 and 1980–1985).
- Javier Pérez de Cuéllar (1920–2020), former Secretary-General of the UN.
- Manuel Dammert (1949–2021), politician and sociologist.
- Alan García (1949–2019), President of Peru (1985–1990 and 2006–2011).
- Robert Garcia (born 1977), U.S. representative for California
- Daniel Hannan (born 1971), Member of European Parliament.
- Jim Himes (born 1966), U.S. representative for Connecticut
- José Jerí (born 1986), the 65th President of Peru.
- Pedro Pablo Kuczynski (born 1938), the 59th President of Peru (2016–2018).
- Luis Felipe de Las Casas Grieve (1916–1988), politician and engineer.
- Diego de Peñalosa (1621–1687) Governor of Spanish New Mexico in 1661–1664.
- Javier Valle Riestra (born 1932), lawyer and politician.
- Ricardo Rossel (1841–1909), author, poet, politician, scholar and entrepreneur.
- Antonieta Zevallos de Prialé (1918/1919–2006), Congress of the Republic of Peru member

=== Photographers ===
- Martín Chambi (1891–1973), photographer, from Puno, Peru.
- Elsa Cayo (born 1951), filmmaker, and photographer.
- Mario Testino (born 1954), fashion and portrait photographer.

=== Writers ===
- Xavier Abril (1905–1990), poet and essayist.
- Martín Adán (1908–1985), poet, hermeticism and metaphysical depth.
- Raúl Allain (born 1989), writer, poet, editor and sociologist.
- Rosa Arciniega (1909–1999), novelist with a Socialist bent.
- Jaime Bayly (born 1965), writer, journalist and media personality.
- Violeta Bermúdez (born 1961), lawyer, writer and diplomat.
- Samuel Brejar (1941–2006), poet.
- Alfredo Bryce (born 1939), novelist.
- Alonso Cueto (born 1954), author, university professor and newspaper columnist.
- María Emma Mannarelli (born 1954), feminist writer, historian and professor.
- Julia Ferrer (1925–1995), poet and writer.
- Mercedes Gallagher (1883–1950), writer and academic.
- Francisco García Calderón Rey (1883–1953), writer.
- Carlos Germán Belli (born 1927), poet.
- Doris Gibson (1910–2008), magazine writer and publisher.
- Javier Heraud (1942–1963), poet and member of the Ejército de Liberación Nacional (ELN).
- Rodolfo Hinostroza (1941–2016), poet, writer, journalist, food critic and astrologer.
- Alexis Iparraguirre (born 1974), short story writer.
- Fernando Iwasaki (born 1961), writer and historian.
- Alex Kuczynski (born 1970), writer and author.
- Lastenia Larriva (1848–1924), poet, writer, and journalist.
- Ana María Llona Málaga (born 1936), peot.
- Victor Llona (1886–1953), writer and translator.
- Carlos Lozada (born 1971), journalist and author.
- José María Eguren (1874–1942), writer.
- Rosa Mercedes Riglos (1826–1891), writer.
- Francisco Miró Quesada Cantuarias (1918–2019), philosopher, journalist and politician.
- Óscar Miró Quesada de la Guerra (a.k.a. Racso) (1884–1981), scientific journalist.
- Silvia Núñez del Arco (born 1988), writer and wife of journalist.
- Angélica Palma (1878–1935), writer, journalist and biographer.
- Clemente Palma (1872-1946), writer.
- Ricardo Palma (1833–1919), poet, novelist and short story writer.
- Felipe Pardo y Aliaga (1806–1868), poet, satirist, playwright, lawyer and politician.
- Daniel Peredo (1969–2018), journalist, announcer and writer.
- Julio Ramón Ribeyro (1929–1994), short story writer and novelist.
- Gabriel Rimachi Sialer (born 1974), writer, journalist, and archeologist.
- José de la Riva Agüero (1783–1858), soldier, politician, and historian.
- Gonzalo Rodríguez Risco (born 1972), playwright and screenwriter.
- María Rostworowski (1915–2016), historian.
- Isabel Sabogal (born 1958), bilingual novelist, poet, translator of Polish literature into Spanish and astrologer.
- Sebastián Salazar Bondy (1924–1965), playwright, essayist, poet, and journalist.
- Claudia Salazar Jiménez (born 1976), writer, editor, academic and a cultural manager.
- José Santos Chocano (1875–1934), poet, writer and diplomat.
- Manuel Scorza (1928–1983), novelist, poet, and political activist.
- Javier Sologuren (1921–2004), writer and poet.
- Guillermo Thorndike (1940–2009), journalist and writer.
- Juan Manuel Ugarte Eléspuru (1911–2004), painter, writer and historian.
- Claudia Ulloa (born 1979), writer.
- Alberto Valdivia Baselli (born 1977), poet, writer, essayist, literary scholar, and specialist.
- Diego Valverde Villena (born 1967), poet, essayist and polyglot.
- Blanca Varela (1926–2009), poet.
- Álvaro Vargas Llosa (born 1966), writer and political commentator and public speaker on international affairs.
- Virginia Vargas (born 1945), sociologist.
- Gabriela Wiener (born 1975), writer, chronicler, poet and journalist.
- María Wiesse (1894–1964), poet, writer, essayist, anthologist, and film critic.
- Álvaro Torres-Calderón (born 1975), poet and associate professor.

=== Entertainers ===
- Carlos Alcántara (born 1964), stand-up comedian and actor.
- Jorge Aravena (born 1969), telenovela actor.
- Silvana Arias (born 1982), actress.
- Roberto Ballesteros (born 1959), actor.
- Areliz Benel (born 1988), actress.
- Diego Bertie (1967–2022), actor and singer.
- Ricardo Blume (1933–2020), actor and theatre director.
- Gladys Zender (1939), Miss Universe 1957.
- Monserrat Brugué (born 1967), actress, television, cinema, and theatre.
- Roxana Brusso (born 1978), actress.
- Prisca Bustamante (born 1964), actress.
- Analí Cabrera (1959–2011), actress, vedette, athlete, and dancer.
- Carolina Cano (born 1985), actress and dancer of French descent.
- Pierina Carcelén (born 1979), actress, model and dancer.
- Jason Day (born 1985), actor.
- Salvador del Solar (born 1970), actor.
- Katerina D'Onofrio (born 1978), actress.
- Rebeca Escribens (born 1972), actress, TV Host., radio host and producer.
- Rossana Fernández-Maldonado (born 1977), actress, singer and TV host.
- Josetty Hurtado (born 1988), actress and dancer.
- Karina Jordán (born 1985), actress.
- Saby Kamalich (1939–2017), actress.
- Nathalie Kelley (born 1984), actress.
- László Kovács (born 1978), television actor.
- Amaranta Kun (born 1993), actress.
- Ismael La Rosa (born 1977), actor.
- Jimena Lindo (born 1976), actress, dancer and TV presenter.
- Tilsa Lozano (born 1982), actress and model.
- Santiago Magill (born 1977), actor who acts in soap-opera, TV series and films.
- José Manuel Peláez (born 1988), actor.
- Irma Maury (born 1950), actress.
- Roberto Moll (born 1948), actor.
- Verónica Montes (born 1990), international actress.
- Carmen Olmedo (1909-1985), actress, dancer, songwriter and vedette.
- Joaquín de Orbegoso (born 1979), actor.
- Giselle Patrón (born 1987), model and actress.
- Bernie Paz (born 1968), telenovela actor.
- Diana Quijano (born 1962), actress and model.
- Eugenio Retes (1895–1987), actor and writer.
- Cesar Ritter (born 1979), actor.
- Cristian Rivero (born 1978), television host, actor and male model.
- Sofía Rocha (1967–2019), actress of cinema, television and theater.
- John Ruddock (1897–1981), film and television actor.
- Oswaldo Salas (born 1962), film, TV and theater actor.
- Johanna San Miguel (born 1967), actress, presenter and comedian.
- Mónica Sánchez (born 1970), actress.
- Pietro Sibille (born 1977), actor.
- Vanessa Terkes (born 1978), film, television and stage actress.
- Magdyel Ugaz (born 1984), actress and television presenter.
- Valeria Vereau (born 1986), actress and producer.
- Micaela Villegas (1748–1819), entertainer and mistress.

=== Musicians ===
- Ádammo, rock-pop band.
- Arena Hash, pop band.
- Tati Alcántara (born 1977), actress, dancer, choreographer, singer, model & entrepreneur.
- Maria Alejandra Quintanilla, (born 1990), multidisciplinary auteur, co-director and recording artist.
- Ángel Aníbal Rosado (1942–2008), composer and musician.
- Rosa Mercedes Ayarza de Morales (1881–1969), composer.
- Eva Ayllón (born 1956), Afro-Peruvian folk singer.
- Susana Baca (born 1944), Grammy Award-winning folk singer.
- Cecilia Barraza (born 1952), singer of música criolla.
- José Bernardo Alcedo (1788–1878), composer.
- Cecilia Bracamonte (born 1949), singer.
- Anahí de Cárdenas (born 1983), actress, model, dancer and singer.
- Anna Carina (born 1981), dancer, actress and singer-songwriter.
- Benjamín Castañeda (1846–1913), composer, pianist and music educator
- Arturo "Zambo" Cavero (1940–2009), folk singer.
- Stephanie Cayo (born 1988), actress, singer and songwriter.
- Cementerio Club, indie pop band.
- Mar de Copas, indie pop band.
- Jaime Cuadra (born 1970), music producer, marketing specialist, singer, and composer.
- Fabiola de la Cuba (born 1966), singer.
- Sadiel Cuentas (born 1973), composer of contemporary classical music.
- Santino De La Tore (born 1973), musician, composer, songwriter, videographer and vocalist.
- Jaime Delgado Aparicio (1943–1983), jazz pianist, arranger, and conductor.
- Denisse Dibós (born 1967), actress, theatrical producer, music director, art educator, dance instructor, singer, and businessperson.
- Juan Diego Florez (born 1973), tenor vocalist.
- Rossana Fernández-Maldonado (born 1977), actress, singer and TV host.
- Frágil, progressive rock band.
- Eric Fukusaki (born 1991), singer.
- Aída García Naranjo (born 1951), educator, singer, and politician.
- Celso Garrido Lecca (1926–2025), composer.
- Mayra Goñi (born 1992), actress and singer.
- Immortal Technique (born 1978), hip hop artist.
- Liberato Kani (born 1993), hip-hop singer and songwriter.
- Karina (born 1968), Latin pop music singer, songwriter, and actress.
- Daniela Lalita (born 1992), musician, artist and model
- Líbido, rock band.
- Lissette (born 1947), singer, songwriter, and record producer.
- Jimmy Lopez (born 1978), composer.
- Pelo Madueño (born 1968), singer-songwriter, producer, actor, and broadcaster.
- Alicia Maguiña (1938–2020), composer and singer.
- Manzanita y su Conjunto, tropical music band.
- Maricarmen Marín (born 1982), actress, cumbia singer, dancer, and TV host.
- Gian Marco (born 1970), pop singer and composer.
- Christian Meier (born 1970), pop singer and actor.
- Rosa Merino (1790–1868), soprano singer.
- Betty Missiego (born 1938), singer.
- Mia Mont (born 1989), singer and songwriter.
- Adalí Montero (born 1982), singer and composer.
- Cecilia Noël, combines salsa, soul, jazz, funk, and Afro-Cuban traditions.
- Franco Noriega (born 1989), restaurant business, modelling, television, and the music industry.
- Bettina Oneto (born 1957), actress, humorist, singer, stand-up comedian, and producer.
- Ebelin Ortiz (born 1971), actress, television presenter, and singer.
- Ernesto Palacio (born 1946), tenor.
- Lorenzo Palacios Quispe (1950–1994), singer and musician.
- Clara Petrozzi (born 1965), violinist, violist, musicologist and composer.
- Jazmín Pinedo (born 1990), television presenter, television personality and former model.
- Felipe Pinglo Alva (1899–1936), considered the father of Peruvian folk music ("musica criolla").
- Gisela Ponce de León (born 1985), film, television and stage actress and singer.
- Amanda Portales (born 1961), singer, author and composer.
- Andrés Prado (born 1971), guitarist and musician.
- Lucha Reyes (1936–1973), folk singer.
- Pamela Rodríguez (born 1983), singer.
- Beth Rowley (born 1981), English singer-songwriter.
- Nicomedes Santa Cruz (1925–1992), Afro-Peruvian folk singer and poet.
- Leslie Shaw (born 1989), singer, model, dancer and actress.
- Ramón Stagnaro (1954–2022), guitarist and producer.
- Pedro Suárez Vértiz (born 1969), pop singer.
- Thes One (born 1977), Christopher Portugal, MC and producer of People Under The Stairs.
- TK, rock-pop band.
- Uchpa, rock and blues band.
- José María Valle Riestra (1859–1925), composer.
- Jesús Vásquez (1920–2010), singer.
- Milena Warthon (born 2000), singer-songwriter.
- Karin Zielinski (born 1982), composer, record producer and singer.

=== Sports ===
- Luis Abram (born 1996), footballer.
- Eusebio Acasuzo (born 1952), footballer.
- Daniel Agüero (born 1997), artistic gymnast.
- Kluiverth Aguilar (born 2003), footballer.
- Rotceh Aguilar (born 2001), footballer.
- Fiorella Aíta (born 1977), volleyball player.
- Jostin Alarcón (born 2002), footballer.
- Luis Alberto Olcese (born 1981), sailor.
- Oscar Albuquerque (born 1954), footballer.
- José Alegría (born 1980), footballer.
- Armando Alfageme (born 1990), footballer.
- Ingrid Aliaga Fernández (born 1991), chess player.
- Fernando Alva (born 1947), footballer.
- Piero Alva (born 1979), footballer.
- Ismael Alvarado (born 1980), footballer.
- Alfredo Álvarez Calderón (1918–2001), diver.
- Arturo Álvarez (1919–2015), swimmer.
- Nicolás Álvarez (born 1996), tennis player.
- Patricio Álvarez (born 1994), footballer.
- Álvaro Ampuero (born 1992), footballer.
- Víctor Anchante (born 1979), footballer.
- Jaime Aparicio (born 1929), hurdler.
- Koichi Aparicio (born 1992), footballer.
- Pedro Aparicio (born 1982), footballer.
- Pedro Aquino (born 1995), footballer.
- Ernesto Arakaki (born 1979), footballer.
- Hideyoshi Arakaki (born 1998), footballer.
- Alejandro Aramburú (born 1969), tennis player.
- Jorge Araujo (born 1979), footballer.
- Sandra Arévalo (born 1998), footballer.
- Humberto Arguedas (born 1937), footballer.
- Víctor Aspillaga (born 1985), rower.
- Milagros Arruela (born 1992), footballer.
- Mariafe Artacho del Solar (born 1993), beach volleyball player.
- Jorge Arteaga (footballer, born 1966) (born 1966), footballer.
- Jorge Arteaga (footballer, born 1998) (born 1998), footballer.
- Eduardo Astengo (1909–1979), footballer.
- Manuel Bacigalupo (1916–1965), cyclist.
- Rolando Bacigalupo (1914–1989), basketball player.
- José Balbuena (1918–2009), footballer.
- Josepmir Ballón (born 1988), footballer.
- Gerónimo Barbadillo (born 1954), footballer.
- Álvaro Barco (born 1967), footballer.
- Ronald Baroni (born 1966), footballer.
- Sergio Barreda (1951–2002), surfer and surfboard shaper.
- Sixto Barrera (born 1983), sport wrestler.
- Gerson Barreto (born 1995), footballer.
- Manuel Barreto (born 1982), footballer.
- Talía Barrios (born 1980), swimmer.
- Enrique Barzola (born 1989), mixed martial artist.
- Carlos Basombrío (born 1971), footballer.
- Jair Baylón (born 1989), footballer.
- Francisco Bazán (born 1980), footballer.
- Héctor Bazán (born 2001), footballer.
- Mario Bazán (born 1987), runner.
- Rodolfo Bazán (born 1938), footballer.
- Nelson Becerra (born 1987), footballer.
- Víctor Benítez (1935–2022), footballer.
- Gregorio Bernales (born 1976), footballer.
- Bianca Botto (born 1991), tennis player.
- Gerardo Bravo (born 1981), footballer.
- Jhonny Bravo (born 1985), footballer.
- Ricardo Bravo (born 1970), footballer.
- Freddie Brown (1910–1991), amateur cricketer.
- Iván Bulos (born 1993), footballer.
- Alessandro Burlamaqui (born 2002), footballer.
- Ignacio Buse (born 2004), tennis player.
- Diego Bustamante (born 1983), footballer.
- José Bustamante (born 2000), footballer.
- Renato Bustamante (born 1990), footballer.
- Jahir Butrón (born 1975), footballer.
- Moisés Cabada (born 1985), footballer.
- Carlos Cáceda (born 1991), footballer.
- Luis Calderón (1929–2022), footballer.
- Manuel Calderón (born 1990), footballer.
- Marcos Calderón (1928–1987), footballer.
- Raffaella Camet (born 1992), volleyball player.
- Ángelo Campos (born 1993), footballer.
- Herminio Campos (born 1937), footballer.
- Eddy Carazas (born 1974), footballer.
- Cristian Carbajal (born 1999), footballer.
- Gabriela Cárdeñas (1958–2022), volleyball player.
- Juan Carlos Bazalar (born 1968), footballer.
- José Carlos Godoy (1911–1988), basketball player.
- Juan Carlos Mariño (born 1982), footballer.
- Alfredo Carmona (born 1971), footballer.
- Giancarlo Carmona (born 1985), footballer.
- Hugo Carmona (born 1939), footballer.
- Luis Carranza (born 1998), footballer.
- Tarek Carranza (born 1992), footballer.
- André Carrillo (born 1991), footballer.
- José Carvallo (born 1986), footballer.
- Mario de las Casas (1905–2002), footballer.
- Yancarlo Casas (born 1981), footballer.
- Félix Castillo (1928–1978), footballer.
- Mirko Castillo (born 1962), footballer.
- Rafael Castillo (born 1960), football manager.
- Aldo Cavero (born 1971), footballer.
- Sebastián Cavero (born 2002), footballer.
- Luisa Cervera (born 1964), volleyball player.
- Julio César Uribe (born 1958), footballer.
- Miguel Cevasco (born 1986), footballer.
- Roberto Challe (born 1946), footballer.
- César Charún (born 1970), footballer.
- César Chávez-Riva (born 1964), footballer.
- Gianfranco Chávez (born 1998), footballer.
- Richard Chávez (born 2000), footballer.
- Leyla Chihuán (born 1975), politician and former volleyball player.
- Javier Chirinos (born 1960), footballer.
- Lyana Chirinos (born 1992), footballer.
- Carlo Chueca (born 1993), footballer.
- Raquel Chumpitaz (born 1962), volleyball player.
- Marko Ciurlizza (born 1978), footballer.
- Luis Collantes (born 1982), footballer.
- Paul Cominges (born 1975), footballer.
- Miguel Company (born 1945), footballer.
- Jairo Concha (born 1999), footballer.
- Joyce Conde (born 1991), footballer.
- Delia Córdova (1953–2016), volleyball player.
- Jair Córdova (born 1996), footballer.
- Deysi Cori (born 1993), chess player.
- Jorge Cori (born 1995), chess grandmaster.
- Cristina Cornejo (born 1985), weightlifter.
- Manuel Corrales (born 1982), footballer.
- Gary Correa (born 1990), footballer.
- Aldo Corzo (born 1989), footballer.
- Alexis Cossio (born 1995), footballer.
- Héctor Cruz (born 1991), footballer.
- Pedro de la Cruz (born 2002), footballer.
- Luis Cruzado (1941–2013), footballer.
- Rinaldo Cruzado (born 1984), footballer.
- Cristina Cuba (born 1996), volleyball player.
- Rodrigo Cuba (born 1992), footballer.
- Teófilo Cubillas (born 1949), footballer.
- Anderson Cueto (born 1989), footballer.
- César Cueto (born 1952), footballer.
- Miguel Curiel (born 1988), footballer.
- Luis Daniel Hernández (born 1977), footballer.
- Beto da Silva (born 1996), footballer.
- Willy Dasso (1917–1990), basketball player.
- Christian Dávila (born 1990), footballer.
- Luis de Souza (1908–2008), footballer.
- Alessandro de Souza Ferreira (born 1992), sports shooter.
- José del Solar (born 1967), footballer.
- Erick Delgado (born 1982), footballer.
- Violeta Delgado (born 1996), volleyball player.
- Tony DeSouza (born 1974), professional mixed martial artist.
- Davis Deza (born 1992), footballer.
- Carlos di Laura (born 1964), tennis player.
- Melissa Díaz (born 1983), footballer.
- Eduardo Dibós Chappuis (1927–1973), racing driver.
- Juan Diego Gutiérrez (born 1992), footballer.
- Juan Diego Li (born 1995), footballer.
- Jhojan Dominguez (born 2000), footballer.
- Sandy Dorador (born 1989), footballer.
- César Doy (born 1982), footballer.
- Ignacio Drago (born 1985), footballer.
- Jaime Duarte (born 1955), footballer.
- Francisco Duclós (born 1996), footballer.
- Alfonso Dulanto (born 1969), footballer.
- Gustavo Dulanto (born 1995), footballer.
- Mauricio Echazú (born 1989), tennis player.
- Diego Elías (born 1996), squash player.
- Roberto Elías (born 1940), footballer.
- Daniel Eral (born 1940), footballer.
- Jeremi Escate (born 2002), footballer.
- Gianfranco Espejo (1988–2011), footballer.
- Jorge Espejo (born 1976), footballer.
- Renato Espinosa (born 1998), footballer.
- Diego Espinoza (born 2001), footballer.
- Gianfranco Espinoza (born 1986), footballer.
- José Espinoza (born 1974), footballer.
- Leonor Espinoza (born 1998), parataekwondo practitioner.
- Guillermo Esteves (born 1986), football manager.
- Sidney Faiffer (born 1980), footballer.
- Denisse Fajardo (born 1964), volleyball player.
- Jefferson Farfán (born 1984), footballer.
- Rafael Farfán (born 1975), footballer.
- Ricardo Farro (born 1985), footballer.
- Carlos Fernández (born 1984), footballer.
- Daniel Fernandez (born 1985), chess grandmaster.
- Raúl Fernández (born 1985), footballer.
- Wenceslao Fernández (born 1979), footballer.
- Arturo Ferreyros (1924–2007), basketball player.
- Nicolás Figueroa (born 2002), footballer.
- Carlos Flores (born 1988), footballer.
- Emily Flores (born 1990), footballer.
- Juan Flores (born 1976), footballer.
- Scarleth Flores (born 1996), footballer.
- Juan Francisco Hernández (born 1978), footballer.
- Maguilaura Frias (born 1997), volleyball player.
- Nicolás Fuchs (born 1982), racing driver.
- Sergio Galdós (born 1990), tennis player.
- Plácido Galindo (1906–1988), footballer.
- Alberto Gallardo (1940–2001), footballer.
- José Gallardo (born 2001), footballer.
- Miriam Gallardo (born 1968), volleyball player.
- Paulo Gallardo (born 2001), footballer.
- Pedro Gallese (born 1990), footballer
- Gianmarco Gambetta (born 1991), footballer.
- Alan Garcia (born 1985), thoroughbred horse racing jockey.
- Cristian García (born 1981), footballer.
- Martín García (born 1970), footballer.
- Raziel García (born 1994), footballer.
- Rosa García (born 1964), volleyball player.
- Hugo Gastulo (born 1957), footballer.
- Déborah Gaviria (born 1978), tennis player.
- Raul Geller (born 1936), Peruvian-Israeli footballer.
- Óscar Gómez Sánchez (1934–2008), footballer.
- Jorge Góngora (1906–1999), footballer.
- Antonio Gonzales (born 1986), footballer.
- Carlos Gonzales Ávalos (born 1989), footballer.
- Christofer Gonzáles (born 1992), footballer.
- Juan González-Vigil (born 1985), footballer.
- Grimaldo González (1922–2007), footballer.
- Félix Goyzueta (born 1991), footballer.
- Richard Green (born 1949), footballer.
- Joao Grimaldo (born 2003), footballer.
- Rafael Guarderas (born 1993), footballer.
- Gino Guerrero (born 1992), footballer.
- Paolo Guerrero (born 1984), footballer.
- Michael Guevara (born 1984), footballer.
- Renzo Guevara (born 1983), footballer.
- José Guidino (born 1996), footballer.
- Carlos Guido (born 1966), footballer.
- Roberto Guizasola (born 1984), footballer.
- Efrain Gusquiza (born 1945), weightlifter.
- Alejandro Guzmán (born 1941), footballer.
- José Guzmán (born 1937), basketball player.
- Paolo de la Haza (born 1983), footballer.
- Aurora Heredia (born 1959), volleyball player.
- Manuel Heredia (born 1986), footballer.
- Éder Hermoza (born 1990), footballer.
- Luis Hernández (born 1981), footballer.
- Martín Hidalgo (born 1976), footballer.
- Hernán Hinostroza (born 1993), footballer.
- John Hinostroza (born 1980), footballer.
- Alejandro Hohberg (born 1991), footballer.
- Luis Horna (born 1980), tennis player.
- Katherine Horny (born 1969), volleyball player.
- Jaime Huerta (born 1987), footballer.
- Arklon Huertas del Pino (born 1994), tennis player.
- Conner Huertas del Pino (born 1995), tennis player.
- Carlos Huntley-Robertson (1908–1982), rugby union player.
- Anastasia Iamachkine (born 2000), tennis player.
- Luis Iberico (born 1998), footballer.
- Germain Iglesias (born 1959), footballer.
- Damián Ísmodes (born 1989), footballer.
- Tomás Iwasaki (1937–2020), footballer.
- Luis Jacob (1912, date of death unknown), basketball player.
- Carlos Jaguande (born 1969), footballer.
- Juan Jayo (born 1973), footballer.
- Camilo Jiménez (born 1996), footballer.
- Esperanza Jiménez (born 1942), volleyball player.
- María José López (born 1985), footballer.
- Juan José Oré (born 1954), footballer.
- Juan Joya (1934–2007), footballer.
- Sara Joya (born 1976), volleyball player.
- Enrique M. Jurado (born 1976), thoroughbred horse racing jockey.
- Israel Kahn (born 1988), footballer.
- Haruki Kanashiro (born 1977), footballer.
- Patricia Kú Flores (born 1993), tennis player.
- Eugenio La Rosa (born 1962), footballer.
- Guillermo La Rosa (born 1952), footballer.
- Christian La Torre (born 1990), footballer.
- Didier La Torre (born 2002), footballer.
- Daniel la Torre Regal (born 1997), badminton player.
- Paula la Torre Regal (born 1999), badminton player.
- Ernesto Labarthe (born 1956), footballer.
- Gianfranco Labarthe (born 1984), footballer.
- Enrique Labo Revoredo (1939–2014), football referee.
- Orlando Lavalle (born 1969), football manager.
- Víctor Lavalle (1911–1975), footballer.
- Tony Ledgard (born 1971), cyclist.
- Germán Leguía (born 1954), footballer.
- Angela Leyva (born 1996), volleyball player.
- Jenny Lidback (born 1963), golfer.
- Salomón Libman (born 1984), footballer.
- Mónica Liyau (born 1967), table tennis player.
- Antonio Lizarbe (born 1988), footballer.
- Luis Llontop (born 1985), footballer.
- Mathías Llontop (born 2002), footballer.
- Juan López (born 1934), coxswain.
- Jhilmar Lora (born 2000), footballer.
- César Loyola (born 1965), footballer.
- Nilson Loyola (born 1994), footballer.
- Salvador Lues (born 1999), rugby union player.
- María Luisa Doig (born 1991), foil and epee fencer.
- José Luis Carranza (born 1964), footballer.
- José Luis Noriega (born 1969), tennis player.
- Julio Luna Portal (born 1950), footballer.
- Teodoro Luña (born 1938), footballer.
- Jesús Luzardo (born 1997), baseball player.
- Daniela Macías (born 1997), badminton player.
- Flavio Maestri (born 1973), footballer.
- Alex Magallanes (born 1974), footballer.
- Natalia Málaga (born 1964), volleyball player.
- Eduardo Malásquez (born 1957), footballer.
- Kina Malpartida (born 1980), super featherweight class boxing world champion.
- Francesco Manassero (born 1964), footballer.
- Reimond Manco (born 1990), footballer.
- Juan Manuel Polar (born 1983), rally driver.
- Juan Manuel Vargas (born 1983), footballer.
- Antonio Maquilón (1902–1984), footballer.
- Carlos Marcenaro (1912–1988), middle-distance runner.
- Manuel Marengo (born 1973), footballer.
- José María Lavalle (1902–1984), footballer.
- José María Lúcar (born 1992), boxer.
- Jeisson Martínez (born 1994), footballer.
- Nahomi Martínez (born 1997), footballer.
- Roberto Martínez (born 1967), footballer.
- Rodrigo Masias (born 1981), basketball player.
- Marco Matellini (born 1972), sport shooter.
- Paola Mautino (born 1990), athlete, long jump and sprinting events.
- Fernando Maynetto (born 1955), tennis player.
- Javier McFarlane (born 1991), athlete, long jump and sprinting events.
- Jorge McFarlane (born 1988), athlete, long jump and sprinting events.
- Franco Medina (born 1999), footballer.
- David Mejía (born 2003), footballer.
- Julio Meléndez (born 1945), footballer.
- Miguel Mena (1986–2021), thoroughbred horse racing jockey.
- Héctor Menacho (born 1928), rower.
- Jesús Mendieta (born 1998), footballer.
- Enrique Mendizábal (1918–2017), sport shooter.
- Carlomagno Meneses (1927–2012), boxer.
- Lucca Mesinas (born 1996), world champion surfer.
- Antonio Meza-Cuadra (born 1982), footballer.
- Ramón Mifflin (born 1947), footballer.
- Alessandro Milesi (born 1999), footballer.
- Diego Mini (born 1999), badminton player.
- Iván Miranda (born 1980), tennis player.
- Miguel Miranda (1966–2021), footballer.
- Katherine Miranda Chang (born 1994), tennis player.
- José Moisela (born 1980), footballer.
- Anthony Molina (born 1990), footballer.
- Javier Molina (born 1985), footballer.
- Mauricio Montes (born 1982), footballer.
- Carlos Montoya (born 2002), footballer.
- Manuel Morales (born 1987), basketball player.
- Alessandro Morán (born 1972), footballer.
- Carlos Moscoso (1902–1957), footballer.
- Nemesio Mosquera (born 1936), footballer.
- Milagros Moy (born 1975), volleyball player.
- Darío Muchotrigo (born 1970), footballer.
- Sofia Mulanovich (born 1983), world champion surfer.
- Germán Muñoz (born 1973), footballer.
- Franco Navarro (born 1961), footballer.
- José Navarro (born 1948), footballer.
- Donny Neyra (born 1984), footballer.
- Liliana Neyra (born 1993), footballer.
- Augusto Nicolini (born 1972), sailor.
- Nicolas Nieri (1939–2017), footballer.
- Dánica Nishimura (born 1996), badminton player.
- Enio Novoa (born 1986), footballer.
- Carlos Olascuaga (born 1992), footballer.
- Aldo Olcese (born 1974), footballer.
- Percy Olivares (born 1968), footballer.
- Antonio Oré (1914–1994), basketball player.
- Raúl Orlandini (1952–2006), rally driver.
- Ariana Orrego (born 1998), artistic gymnast.
- Karla Ortiz (born 1991), volleyball player.
- Rodrigo Pacheco (born 1983), badminton player.
- Lauro Pacussich (born 1940), rower.
- Juan Pablo Farfán (born 1985), footballer.
- Juan Pablo Goicochea (born 2005), footballer.
- Juan Pablo Varillas (born 1995), tennis player.
- Juan Pablo Vergara (1985–2019), footballer.
- Pedro Pablo León (1943–2020), footballer.
- Juan Pajuelo (born 1974), footballer.
- Vanessa Palacios (born 1984), volleyball player.
- Andy Pando (born 1983), footballer.
- George Pastor (born 1963), footballer.
- Jorge Patiño (born 1911), sport shooter.
- Daniel Peláez (born 1985), footballer.
- Sergio Peña (born 1995), footballer.
- César Peñaranda (1915–2007), cyclist.
- Diego Penny (born 1984), footballer.
- José Pereda (born 1973), footballer.
- Lucciana Pérez Alarcón (born 2005), tennis player.
- Gabriela Pérez del Solar (born 1968), volleyball player and politician.
- Jean Pierre Fuentes (born 1991), footballer.
- Carmen Pimentel (born 1961), volleyball player.
- Óscar Pinto (born 2002), footballer.
- Claudio Pizarro (born 1978), footballer.
- Diego Pizarro (born 1990), footballer.
- Francisco Pizarro (born 1971), footballer.
- Andy Polo (born 1994), footballer.
- Giuliano Portilla (born 1972), footballer.
- Juan Postigos (born 1989), judoka.
- Amilton Prado (born 1979), footballer.
- Edgar Prado (born 1967), thoroughbred horse racing jockey.
- Claudio Puelles (born 1996), mixed martial artist.
- Pedro Puente (1907–1986), sport shooter.
- Víctor Puente (born 1941), rower.
- Jesús Purizaga (born 1959), footballer.
- Kevin Quevedo (born 1997), footballer.
- Nelinho Quina (born 1987), footballer.
- Marcelo Quiñones (born 1949), boxer.
- Oscar Quiñones (born 1941), chess master.
- Juan Quiñónez (born 1987), footballer.
- Henry Quinteros (born 1977), footballer.
- Piero Quispe (born 2001), footballer.
- Jesús Rabanal (born 1984), footballer.
- Rodolfo Rake (born 1979), tennis player.
- Alberto Ramírez (born 1941), footballer.
- Kevin Ramírez (born 1993), footballer.
- Luis Ramírez (born 1984), footballer.
- Christian Ramos (born 1988), footballer.
- Álvaro Raposo de Oliveira (born 1990), tennis player.
- Freddy Ravello (born 1955), footballer.
- Claudia Razzeto (born 1991), tennis player.
- Miguel Rebosio (born 1976), footballer.
- Luis Redher (born 1964), footballer.
- Pedro Requena (born 1991), footballer.
- Rony Revollar (born 1976), footballer.
- Renzo Revoredo (born 1986), footballer.
- Deyair Reyes (born 1992), footballer.
- Jeickson Reyes (born 1987), footballer.
- Bryan Reyna (born 1998), footballer.
- Juan Reynoso (born 1969), footballer.
- Oscar Rivadeneira (born 1960), boxer.
- Julio Rivera (born 1967), footballer.
- Manuel Rivera (born 1978), footballer.
- Víctor Rivera (born 1968), football manager.
- Claudia Rivero (born 1986), badminton player.
- William Robertson (1879–1950), cricketer.
- Alberto Rodríguez (born 1984), footballer.
- Aldair Rodríguez (born 1994), footballer.
- Kike Rodríguez (born 1991), footballer.
- Mario Rodríguez (born 1972), footballer.
- Martín Rodríguez (born 1968), footballer.
- Orestes Rodríguez Vargas (born 1943), chess player.
- Percy Rojas (born 1949), footballer.
- Roberto Rojas (1955–1991), footballer.
- Sebastián Rojas (born 1999), footballer.
- Frank Romero (born 1987), footballer.
- Ricardo Ronceros (born 1977), footballer.
- César Rosales (born 1970), footballer.
- Exar Rosales (born 1984), footballer.
- Daniella Rosas (born 2002), world champion surfer.
- Víctor Rossel (born 1985), footballer.
- Angelo Rovegno (born 1999), footballer.
- Leonardo Ruíz (born 2000), footballer.
- Marco Ruiz (born 1979), footballer.
- Waldir Sáenz (born 1973), footballer.
- Guillermo Salas (born 1974), footballer.
- Rodolfo Salas (1928–2010), basketball player.
- Ernesto Salazar (born 1990), footballer.
- Javier Salazar (born 1982), footballer.
- Ryan Salazar (born 1982), footballer.
- Santiago Salazar (born 1974), footballer.
- Sebastián Salem (born 1983), golfer.
- Wenceslao Salgado (1900–1980), sport shooter.
- Salvador Salguero (born 1951), footballer.
- Alexander Sánchez (born 1984), footballer.
- Arón Sánchez (born 2003), footballer.
- Daniel Sanchez (born 1990), footballer.
- Juan Sánchez (born 1997), footballer.
- Julia Sánchez (1930–2001), track and field sprinter.
- Maryory Sánchez (born 1997), footballer.
- Rodrigo Sánchez (born 1991), tennis player.
- Massimo Sandi (born 2002), footballer.
- Fernanda Saponara Rivva (born 2001), badminton player.
- Marco Saravia (born 1997), footballer.
- Jorge Sarmiento (1900–1957), footballer.
- Dominique Schaefer (born 1999), tennis player.
- Franz Schmidt (born 2000), footballer.
- Paloma Schmidt (born 1987), sailor.
- Kazuyoshi Shimabuku (born 1999), footballer.
- Matías Silva (born 1984), tennis player.
- Roberto Silva (born 1976), footballer.
- Valeria Silva (born 1985), swimmer/surgeon.
- Carlos Silvestri (born 1976), footballer.
- César Socarraz (1910–1984), footballer.
- Nolberto Solano (born 1974), footballer.
- Carlos Solis (born 1981), footballer.
- Rodolfo Soracco (1927–2018), basketball player.
- David Soria Yoshinari (born 1977), footballer.
- Eleazar Soria (1948–2021), footballer.
- Javier Soria (born 1974), footballer.
- Johan Sotil (born 1982), footballer.
- Cristofer Soto (born 1990), footballer.
- Diana Soto (born 1980), volleyball player.
- Jorge Soto (born 1971), footballer.
- José Soto (born 1970), footballer.
- Guillermo Suárez (1912–1947), long-distance runner.
- Alexander Succar (born 1995), footballer.
- Matías Succar (born 1999), footballer.
- Cecilia Tait (born 1962), volleyball player.
- Hector Takayama (born 1972), footballer.
- Jorge Talavera (born 1963), footballer.
- Jerry Tamashiro (born 1971), footballer.
- Xiao Taotao (born 1997), footballer.
- Renato Tapia (born 1995), footballer.
- Manuel Tejada (born 1989), footballer.
- Freddy Ternero (1962–2015), footballer.
- Alberto Terry (1929–2006), footballer.
- Raúl Tito (born 1997), footballer.
- Guillermo Tomasevich (born 1987), footballer.
- Israel Tordoya (born 1980), footballer.
- Rubén Toribio Díaz (born 1952), footballer.
- Claudio Torrejón (born 1993), footballer.
- Carlos Torres (born 1966), footballer.
- Jorge Torres (born 1999), footballer.
- Miguel Torres (born 1982), footballer.
- Jean Tragodara (born 1985), footballer.
- Louis Tristán (born 1984), long jumper.
- Miryam Tristán (born 1985), footballer.
- Alexis Ubillús (born 1972), footballer.
- Edwin Uehara (born 1969), footballer.
- Adrián Ugarriza (born 1997), footballer.
- Víctor Ulloa (born 1991), footballer.
- Ángel Uribe (1943–2008), footballer.
- Cenaida Uribe (born 1965), volleyball player.
- Édson Uribe (born 1982), footballer.
- Eduardo Uribe (born 1985), footballer.
- Juan Valdivieso (1910–2007), footballer.
- Aarón Valencia (born 2003), footballer.
- Dangelo Valencia (born 1999), footballer.
- Rosa Valiente (born 1996), volleyball player.
- Alex Valle (born 1977 or 1978), fighting game player.
- Duilio Vallebuona (born 1992), tennis player.
- Marcio Valverde (born 1987), footballer.
- Jorge Vargas (born 1942), basketball player.
- Carlos Vásquez (1942–1984), basketball player.
- Jaime Vásquez (born 1991), footballer.
- Jersson Vásquez (born 1986), footballer.
- Johan Vásquez (born 1984), footballer.
- Pilar Vásquez (born 1963), tennis player.
- Héctor Vega (born 1992), footballer.
- Mario Velarde (born 1990), footballer.
- Norma Velarde (born 1946), volleyball player.
- José Velásquez (born 1952), footballer.
- Juan Velásquez (born 1971), footballer.
- Jhonny Vidales (born 1992), footballer.
- Rodrigo Vilca (born 1999), footballer.
- Edgar Villamarín (born 1982), footballer.
- Alejandro Villanueva (1908–1944), footballer.
- Luis Villalta (1969–2004), boxer.
- Junior Viza (born 1985), footballer.
- Pedro Ynamine (born 1998), footballer.
- Jaime Yzaga (born 1967), tennis player.
- Matías Zagazeta (born 2003), racing driver.
- José Zamora (born 1987), footballer.
- Marcelo Zamora (born 1987), footballer.
- Carlos Zegarra (footballer) (born 1987), footballer.
- Carlos Zegarra (judoka) (born 1984), judoka.
- Pablo Zegarra (born 1973), footballer.
- Adrián Zela (born 1989), footballer.
- Juan Zevallos (born 1990), footballer.
- Claudia Zornoza (born 1990), badminton player.
- Ysrael Zúñiga (born 1976), footballer.

=== Other ===
- Gastón Acurio (born 1967), chef.
- Paddington Brown, bear.
- Manuel Buchwald (born 1940), geneticist.
- Juan Jose Cabezudo (died 1860), chef.
- Esteban Campodónico (1866-1938), medical doctor, university professor, and philanthropist
- Ángel Díaz Balbín (1955–1986), triple murderer and suspected serial killer.
- José Eusebio de Llano Zapata (1721–1780), scholar, writer and scientist.
- Pedro Pablo Nakada Ludeña (born 1973), serial killer.
