= Oneto =

Oneto is a surname. Notable people with the surname include:

- Bettina Oneto (born 1957), Peruvian actress and comedian
- Carlos Oneto (1929–2014), Peruvian actor, television personality and comedian, father of Bettina
- Luca Oneto (born 1996), Italian footballer
- Marco Oneto (born 1982), Chilean handball player
- Pepe Oneto (1942–2019), Spanish journalist
- Tomás Oneto (born 1998), Argentine footballer
- Vanina Oneto (born 1973), Argentine field hockey player
