= José Zamora =

José Zamora may refer to:

- José Rubén Zamora (born 1956), Guatemalan engineer and journalist
- José Zamora (footballer, born 1987), Peruvian football centre-back
- José Zamora (footballer, born 1988), Spanish football winger
