= José Bustamante =

José Bustamante may refer to:

- José Bustamante (footballer, born 1907) (1907–?), Bolivian football forward
- José Bustamante (footballer, born 1921) (1921/2–?), Bolivian football defender
- José Bustamante (footballer, born 2000), Peruvian football forward
- José Luis Bustamante y Rivero (1894–1989), President of Peru 1945–1948, President of the International Court of Justice 1967–1970
