= Ferreyros (surname) =

Ferreyros is a surname. Notable people with the surname include:

- Arturo Ferreyros (1924–2007), Peruvian basketball player
- Eduardo Ferreyros Kuppers (born 1959), Peruvian politician
- Ismael Benavides Ferreyros (born 1945), Peruvian politician
