= Wendy Sulca =

Peruvian singer of Huayno music (born 1996)

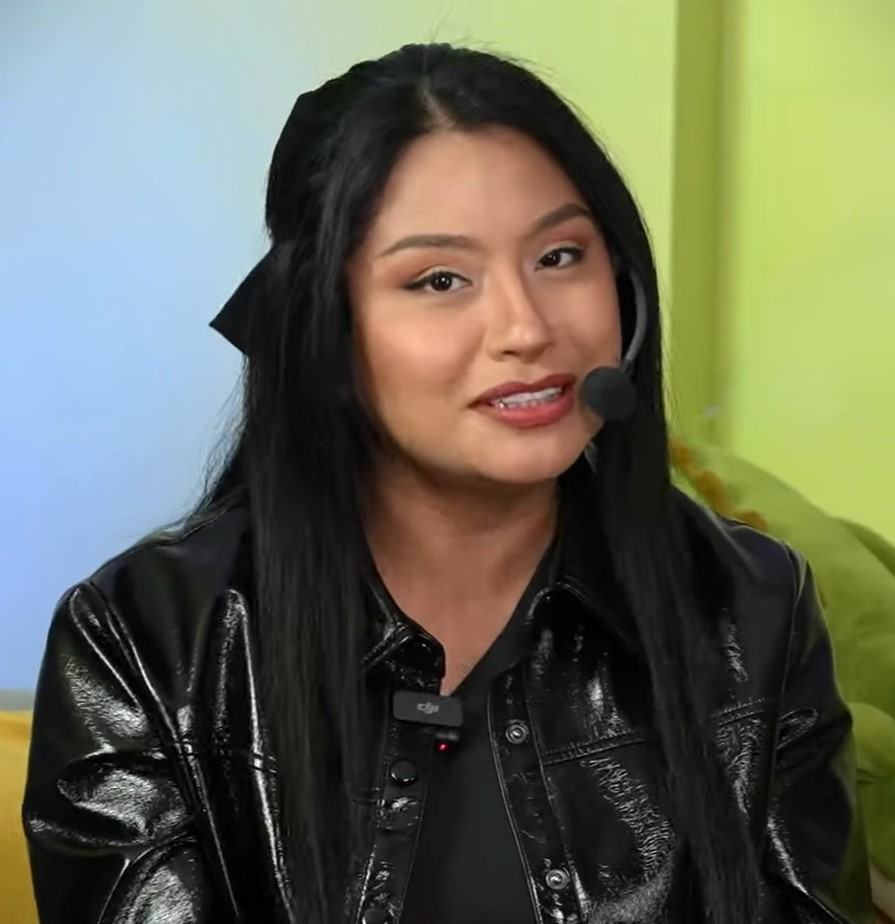
- Sulca in 2024

Background information
- Also known as: La Pequeña Wendy (Little Wendy)
- Born: Wendy Sulca Quispe; 22 April 1996 (age 30); San Juan de Miraflores, Perú
- Origin: Chiclayo, Lima, Peru
- Genres: Huayno, Andean
- Occupations: Singer-songwriter, vocalist
- Instrument: Vocals
- Years active: 2004–present

Wendy Sulca Quispe (born 22 April 1996) is a Peruvian singer of Huayno music.

== Career ==
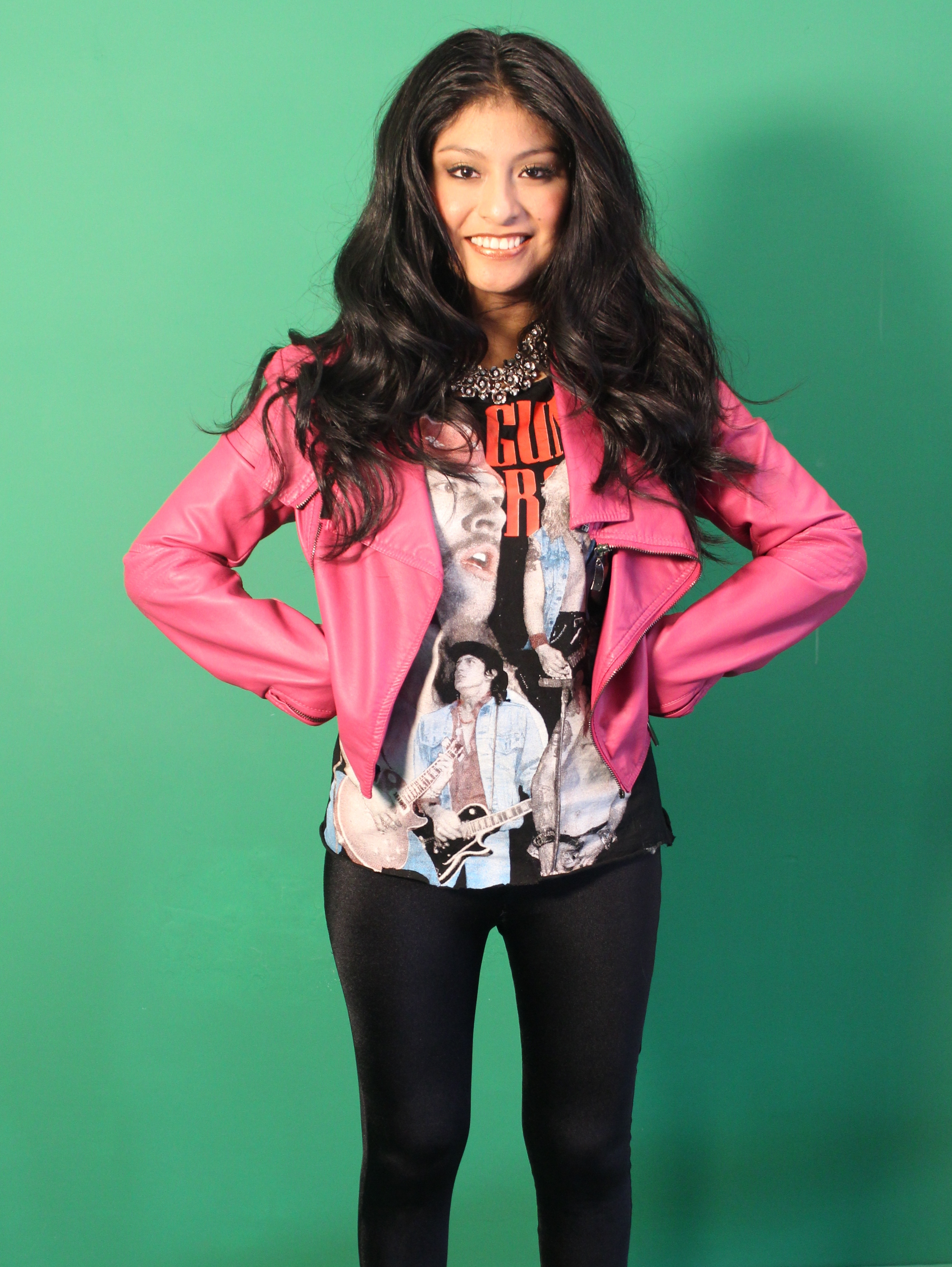
Sulca in 2014

In April 2010 Sulca released the song "En tus Tierras Bailaré" (In your land I shall dance) with the "YouTube stars" Delfín Quishpe and La Tigresa del Oriente. The song received attention in Latin American media and got one million hits in a few weeks. It was called a "Youtube We are the World" by Calle 13 singer Residente.

She was invited to participate in the music video for the song "Pal' suelo con Quique Montenegro" by Dante Spinetta along with Calle 13, Andrés Calamaro y La Tigresa del Oriente.

In December 2010, Sulca made a video called "Tetita Riquita". On 11 June 2011, Sulca performed her first tour to Chile playing in two discotheques, El Huevo in Valparaíso and Blondie in Santiago.

In 2018, Sulca shifted into more urban folk styles, collaborating with Mexican group Café Tacvba, and launching a World Cup-inspired song called "Boom Boom" with Quechua rapper Liberato Kani.
