= Teatro desde el teatro =

- Genre: Comedy; Theater acting
- Directed by: Ricky Tosso
- Starring: See list Ricky Tosso
- Country of origin: Peru
- Original language: Spanish
- No. of seasons: 7
- No. of episodes: 300

Original release
- Network: América Televisión
- Release: 22 August 2002 – 17 December 2008

Teatro desde el teatro was a Peruvian television series, produced from August 2002 to December 2008 by the América Televisión. It was led and directed by Ricky Tosso, along with a mixed variety of actors and entertainers, and was produced by Christian Andrade. The television series transmitted a total of 300 episodes through its 7 seasons.

It is considered one of the programs with an uncommon format for the stellar strip since it was a televised theater series, that is, a theater play was broadcast live each week. Some of them were adaptations of works in the public domain.

In 2011 Tosso proposed to relaunch the series with the participation of other artists, however, the project was halted after his death in 2016.

== Cast ==
Prominent actors who participated in at least one of the plays include:

- Bettina Oneto
- Yvonne Frayssinet
- Carlos Alcántara Vilar
- Gianfranco Brero
- Jesús Delaveaux
- Giovanna Valcárcel
- Rossana Fernández-Maldonado
- Mónica Torres
- Marisela Puicón
- Karina Calmet
- Ebelin Ortiz
- Christian Thorsen
- Brayan Enriquez
- Gian Piero Díaz
