= Bettina Oneto =

Peruvian actress, humorist, singer, stand-up comedian, and producer

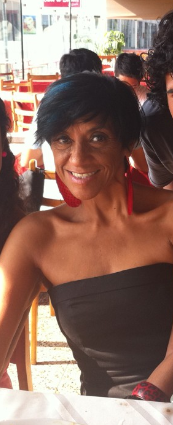
- Born: 27 August 1957 (age 67); Lima, Peru
- Occupation(s): Actress, comedian, producer, singer
- Children: Shantall Young Oneto
- Father: Carlos Oneto

Rosa Bertha Oneto Martínez (born 27 August 1957), better known as Bettina Oneto, is a Peruvian actress, humorist, singer, stand-up comedian, and producer.

== Biography ==
The daughter of comedian Carlos Oneto, Bettina Oneto debuted as a singer in a restaurant with a musical group in Toronto, Canada. She married Richard "Bimbo" Macedo (drummer of the rock group The Mad's), with whom she had her first daughter, Shantall Young Oneto. In 1978 she returned to Peru, where she began acting with Pepe Vilar on the program Teatro como en el teatro. She also appeared on various other programs, such as La comedia Peruana and Volver a vivir.

In 1981 she debuted as a vedette in the revue Paro general at the café-théâtre La Gata Caliente. She then moved to New York, where she attended courses in singing, theater, and dance.

She returned to Peru, where she starred in the revue Los valatos del 85, under the direction of Efraín Aguilar, along with Analí Cabrera, Doris Caballero, and Rodolfo Carrión.

She participated in cafés-théâtres such as El Ático, Sachariel, Canout, Monarisa, La Mueca, and Pimpinela.

From 1985 to 1988 she worked in the Orchestra of Carlos Brescia.

Oneto performed at the Peruvian National Theater, in the play El pájaro azul, playing "The Night". She married footballer Carlos Lazon, with whom she had two children. Beginning in 1998 she appeared in theatrical works directed by Osvaldo Cattone – Con el sexo no se juega, Annie, Marido mas mujer igual desastre, Filumena Marturano, and The Vagina Monologues.

She appeared on the television comedy program Risas y salsa, as well as Teatro desde el teatro.

In 1999 she was called on by the producers and directors of Jucare, and presented the play El espectáculo soy yo in Barranco Station. This was a success, running for three years and touring Japan and the United States. The following year she released an album with the recording of a live performance.

In 2006 she performed in the show ¿Hija de su Madre? In 2007 she starred in the drama Matrimonio a la peruana, and in 2008 she launched El espectáculo sigo siendo yo, compiling various performances from that year.

In 2011 she performed in the telenovela La bodeguita.

In 2012 she celebrated her 36-year artistic career with the show Viva la vida. That May through August, she appeared in the musical Hairspray as Motormouth Maybelle, under the direction of Juan Carlos Fisher at the Teatro Peruano Japonés. She then briefly participated in the dance reality program El Gran Show.

== Television credits ==
- Teatro como en el teatro (1978)
- La comedia Peruana
- Volver a vivir
- Risas y salsa (1997–1999)
- Teatro desde el teatro (2002–2008)
- Noche de estrellas (2003)
- La bodeguita (2011–2012) as Rochi
- El gran show (2011) as guest judge
- El gran show (2012) as contestant
- Pequeños gigantes (2013) as guest judge
- Tu cara me suena (2013–2014) as judge
