= SDLT =

SDLT may refer to:

- Santino De La Tore (born 1973), Peruvian musician
- Social-Democracy of the Latvian Territory, early 20th century predecessor of the Communist Party of Latvia
- Stamp Duty Land Tax, a tax on property purchase in the United Kingdom
- Super Digital Linear Tape, a data storage technology
