= En tus Tierras Bailaré =

Single by Wendy Sulca, Delfin Quishpe and Tigresa del Oriente
- Released: April 19, 2010
- Genre: Electropop, Andean music
- Length: 4:22
- Songwriters: Dario Helman; Gabriel Ricardo Kerpel; Daniel Horacio Martin; Sebastian Ezequiel Muller
- Producer: Gaby Kerpel

Music video
- "En Tus Tierras Bailaré" on YouTube

En Tus Tierras Bailaré (English: "In your lands I will dance") is a Spanish-language viral video that celebrates love for the land and people of Israel. It appeared in April 2010.

The song received attention in Latin American and rapidly got millions of hits. Calle 13 singer Residente called it YouTube's "We Are the World".

== The singers ==
The video features three lead singers and a number of back-up singers. The leads are Peruvian singers La Tigresa del Oriente, Wendy Sulca and Indigenous Kichwa Ecuadorian singer-songwriter Delfin Quishpe, known as "Delfín Hasta El Fín". Quishpe has expressed a desire to visit Israel.

== The video ==
The opening shot is of video Delfin Quishpe sitting in a living room watching television. People on television speak of war, fear, and the dangers of living in Israel, despite the obvious fact that they are not Israeli. Delfin rises to his feet and shouts "This cannot be," spreading his arms high and wide. The video segues to an introduction of each of the singers. The song then continues as a lovesong to Israel and Israelis. Gastón Cleiman, a Buenos Aires advertising man who wrote the song's lyrics describes it as, "a song against prejudice." The score is by Gaby Kerpel and Daniel Martin. Picky Talarico directed the video.

== Production ==
The tracks were recorded separately. Wendy and Bustos were recorded in Lima, while Delfin was recorded in Ecuador. The music was mixed and the video produced in Buenos Aires by Gaby Kerpel. The three performers were not acquainted and did not meet during the production of the video.

== Cultural impact ==
The video was intended by its creators to be taken as a genuinely naive work, a kind of online outsider art. It was taken for such by Alma Guillermoprieto who gushed over it in the ultra-sophisticated New York Review of Books, calling Latin America "the last great reservoir of innocent art," and continuing:

"Their self-confidence and optimism we can only envy, and yet they have lives we can barely imagine (how much did the rural violence provoked by Peru’s Shining Path guerrillas influence Wendy’s parents’ decision to migrate to the capital?); they make choices that to us seem inscrutable (what is that monkey doing behind the rowboat?). But millions of people admire these singers. What the video shows us is the chaotic transformation of a culture that has always had an infinite and joyful capacity for self-invention. This is not outsider but insider art of the deepest sort, forged in a hot-hot crucible, and it is we who stand on the outside, peering wistfully at the screen."

The video's great success has brought new opportunities for the three performers. A party promoter brought La Tigresa to Buenos Aires, where diners in an upscale restaurant greeter her by breaking into the chorus of "En Tus Tierras Bailaré." She was hailed as a gay icon and stopped in the street by fans wanting photos. There was talk of a world tour, ending in Israel.
