= Delfín Quishpe =

Ecuadorian singer-songwriter and politician (born 1977)

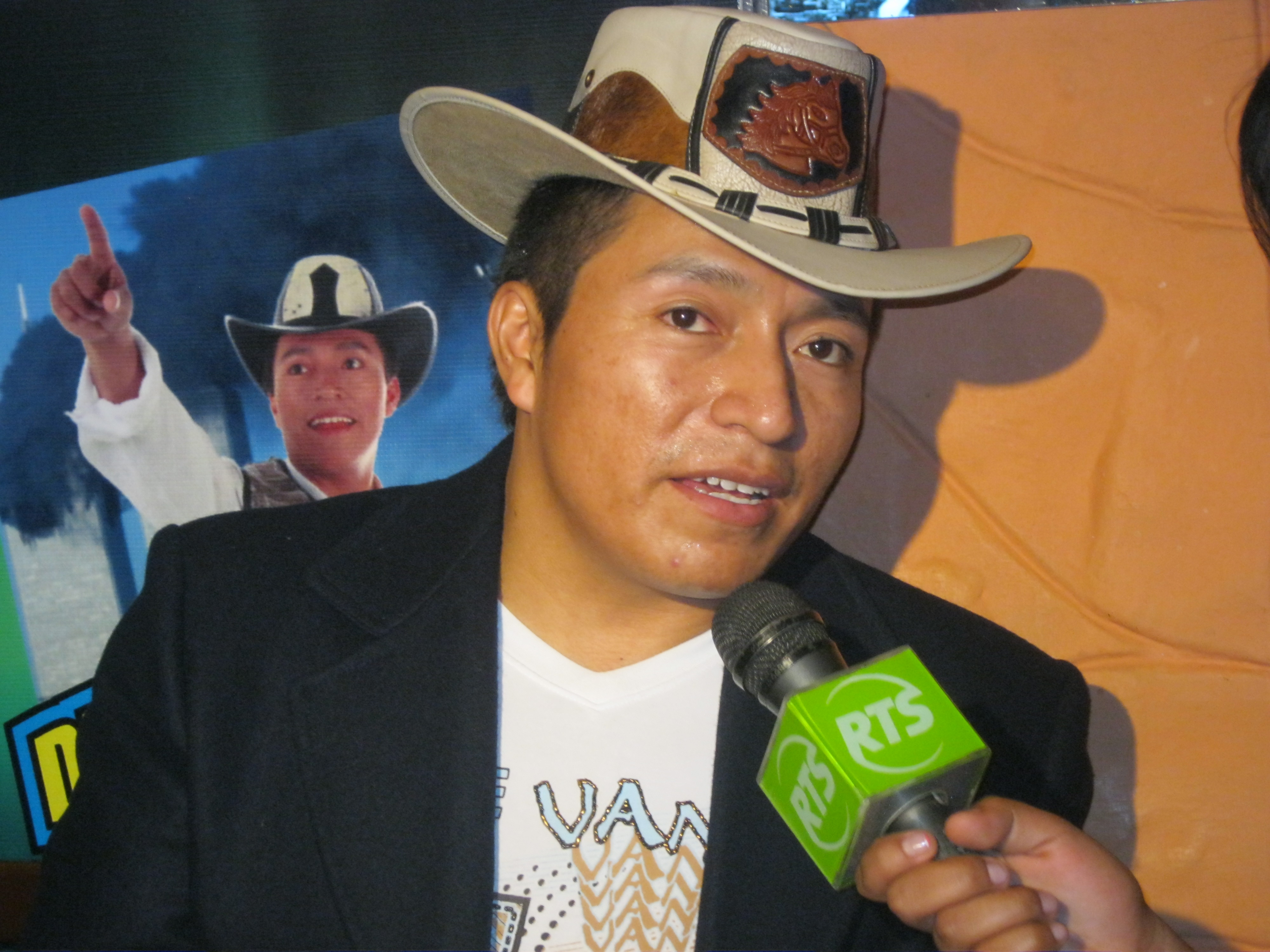
- Delfín Quishpe in Guayaquil (2012)

Mayor of Guamote
- In office 15 May 2019 – 1 February 2023
- Preceded by: Luis Chuquimarca
- Succeeded by: Miguel Marcatoma

Personal details
- Born: Delfín Quishpe Apugllón; 4 December 1977 (age 48) San Antonio, Guamote, Ecuador
- Party: Pachakutik
- Criminal charges: Influence peddling and corruption
- Criminal penalty: 5 years' imprisonment
- Criminal status: Imprisoned
- Musical career
- Also known as: Delfín Hasta el Fin
- Genres: Andean music, Technocumbia
- Instrument: Vocals
- Website: www.quishpe.com

Delfín Quishpe Apugllón (born 4 December 1977), known as Delfin Hasta el Fin (lit: Dolphin until the end) is an Ecuadorian singer-songwriter and politician, who performs a style he calls "Andean techno-folklore". His popularity largely came from the comical nature of his music. Quishpe's song "Torres Gemelas" (Twin Towers) remains the song that has received most attention. He was the mayor of his hometown, Guamote, from May 2019 to February 2023. In March 2021, he was arrested and later sentenced by the Ecuadorian Attorney General's Office, to 5 years in prison for influence peddling and corruption.

== Biography ==
Delfín Quishpe was born in a small town named San Antonio in Guamote, Ecuador, as the son of the merchant Anselmo Quishpe and Mercedes Apugllón.

== Career ==
In 2003, he recorded his second album, "El Gallito". It contained songs such as: "El Gallito Bandido", "El Delfincito", "Cuando Me Vaya", and "Cuaya Huay".

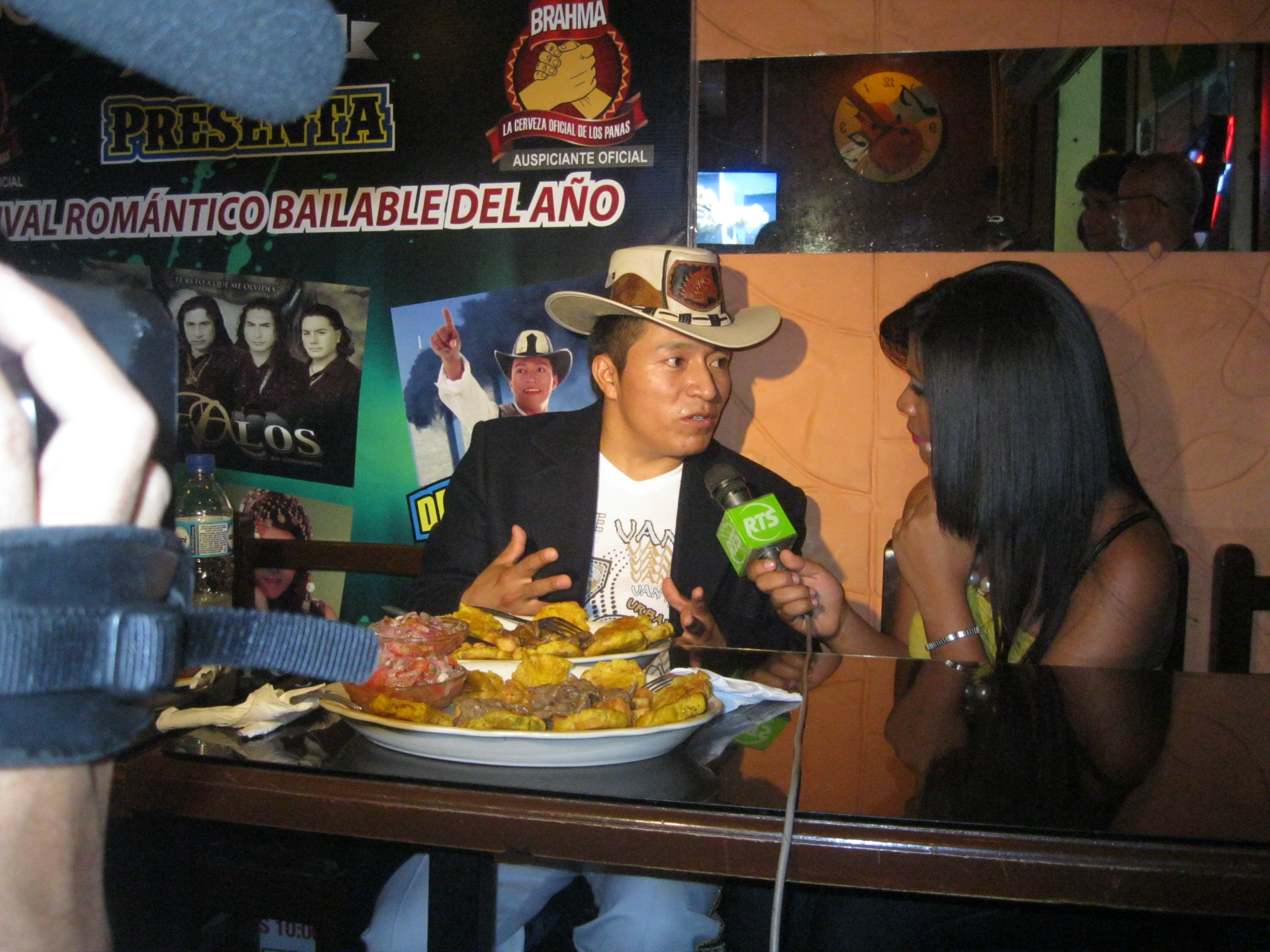
Delfín Quishpe in 2012

In 2006, "Torres Gemelas" (Twin Towers) was released. While the song is tragic in nature, the subject matter being Delfin losing a loved one in the terrorist attack of 9/11, the whimsical and kitschy nature of the song as well as the poor acting in the music video has made this song an internet meme.

In April 2010 Defín Quishpe released the song "En tus Tierras Bailaré", featuring the two Peruvian "YouTube stars" Wendy Sulca and Tigresa del Oriente. The song received attention in Latin American media and rapidly got more than one million hits in a few weeks. The song was later called a "Youtube We are the World" by Calle 13 singer Residente.

== Personal life ==
He has a wife, Rosario Urquiza Coro, and two children, one of whom died in 2018.
