= La Tigresa del Oriente =

Peruvian singer (born 1945)

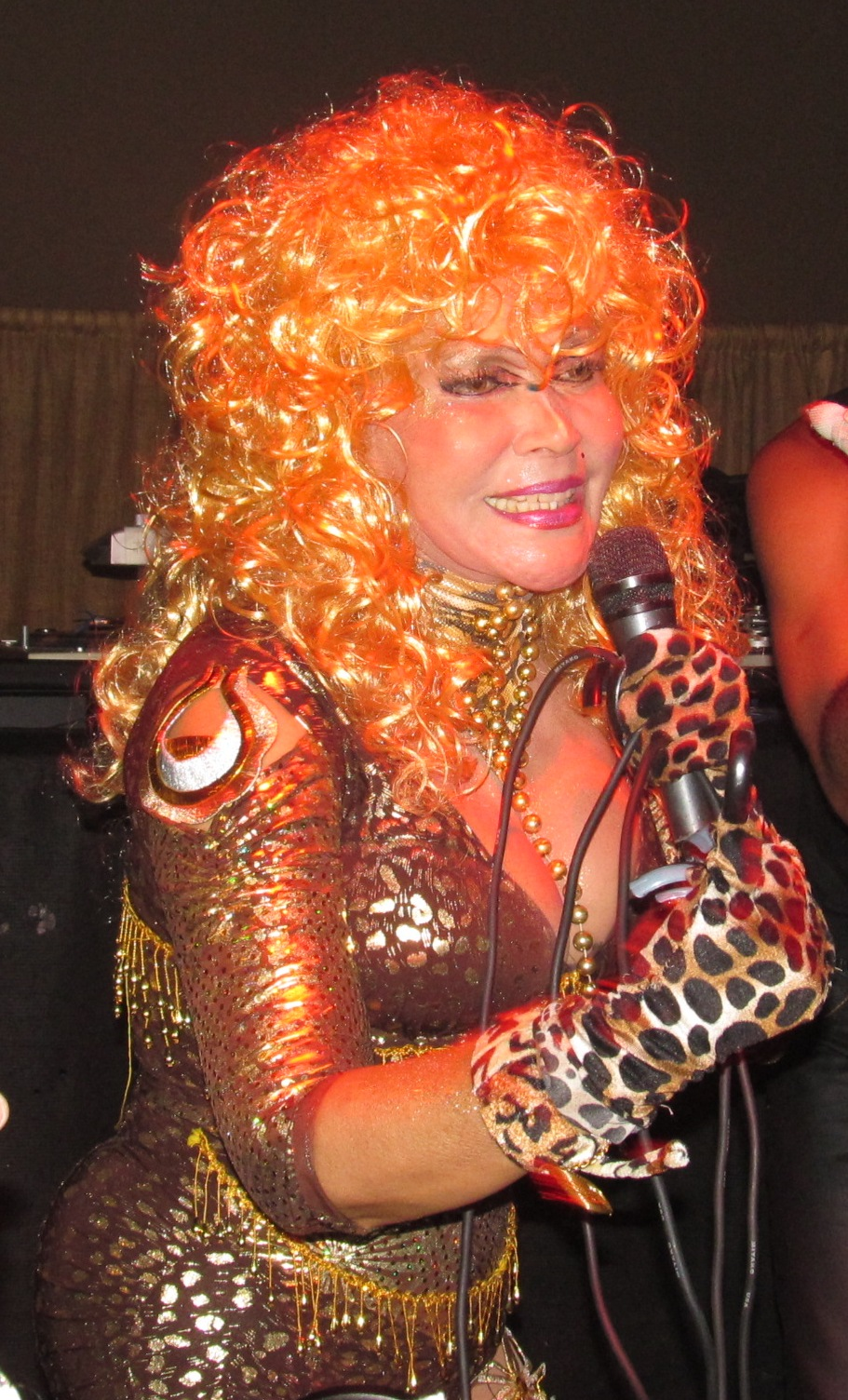
- La Tigresa del Oriente performing in Maracaibo (2011)

Background information
- Born: Juana Judith Bustos Ahuite; 22 November 1945 (age 80); Constancia, Loreto Region, Peru
- Genre: Peruvian cumbia
- Occupations: Singer-songwriter, hairdresser actress, model and makeup artist
- Instrument: Vocals
- Years active: 1964–present
- Labels: Warner Music Mexico (2007); Kántaro Records (2008–present)
- Website: Web official

Juana Judith Bustos Ahuite (born 22 November 1945) is best known as La Tigresa del Oriente (lit. 'The Eastern Tigress', the "east" being the Peruvian Amazon) is a Peruvian singer, hairdresser, actress, makeup artist and model. Due to the popularity of her videos on YouTube (the video for her single "Nuevo Amanecer" surpassed the 10-million-hit mark in 2009), she has become an internet meme and reached some international fame.

La Tigresa is known for her leopard garb, makeup and appearance, and for the choreographies staged by her dancing troupe, which includes three women and one man. Her first single "Nuevo amanecer (New Dawn)" became an Internet meme in Latin America.

Her videos for her first recording are unique, if low in budget, and were filmed in the Peruvian jungle with her "exotic" dancers. Other singles from Bustos include: "Mi canoa", "Carnaval en Iquitos", "Trabaja flojo trabaja", "Anaconda", "Tránsfuga de mi amor", "Hombre de Madera", and "Homenaje al Papa Juan Pablo II."

In 2011, she released her second record label plate Fiesta Felina, and later that same year took the English version of "Nuevo amanecer", entitled "New brighter day".

== Biography ==
Bustos was born in the village of Constancia in the region of Loreto. She was interested in singing and she tried to pursue it as a career. However, it was unsuccessful due to pressure from her parents, and later from her husband, whom she married in a failed hope for greater freedom. Bustos became a cosmetologist at an early age, and relocated to Lima, expecting to be involved in show business in some way, becoming a makeup artist for Lima's television stations and starting a career that lasted for over twenty years.

In 1999, with help from several friends, she started writing songs and created the concept for "La Tigresa" and was later convinced of recording several music videos. Around 2006, her videos appeared on YouTube and rapidly became popular and an internet meme. Since then, she has been invited to several Latin American television shows.

== International Fame ==
According to an interview in the Peruvian newspaper La República, Bustos signed a contract with Warner Bros. Records México for one year. Bustos travelled in July 2009 to Mexico, presenting in the "Muévete" TV show currently broadcast by Canal de las Estrellas.

In August 2009, La Tigresa del Oriente announced a special album from Argentina entitled "De la selva, su fiesta" from independent record label Silvando Discos, after failing to get anywhere with Warner Music Mexico.

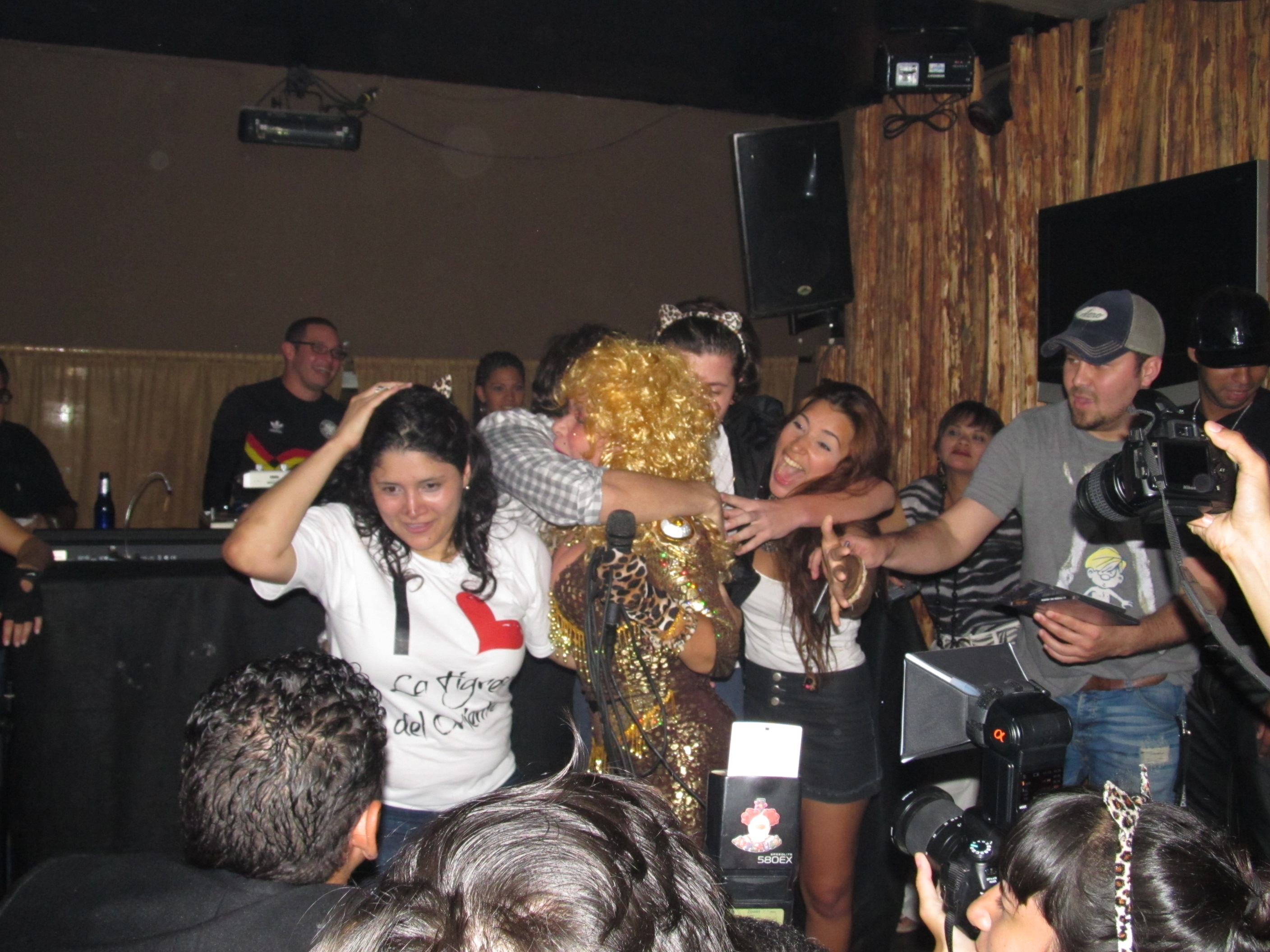
in Maracaibo (Venezuela)

In September 2009 Radio Cumbia Peru, the original uploaders of her popular videos on YouTube announced they were removing the videos from their channel, it was later made public that the reason behind this was that they were asking La Tigresa two thousand dollars for each video kept in the channel, which she declined after considering it blackmail, responding by publishing her videos on her official YouTube Channel.

Releasing her first new singles Felina and El Baile de la Tigresa online, and their respective videoclips soon afterwards. On 6 September 2009, Peruvian channel ATV released a new song called "El Reggaeton del Suri" featuring renowned singer El Pimpo Man, which became her third promotional single from the new album "Fiesta Felina". "La Tigresita" (its latest promotional item), a song dedicated to their fans little ones, in the words of the same Judith. Same will have its music video to debut in March 2011. All this as part of his new album to be released in 2011 announced by herself in her personal Twitter. Later the music videos were released "La Ñañita Loca" and "Mi Lindo Perú". Currently promoting in 2011 his theme "Adolescente".

On 28 December 2009 BBC published an interview describing Tigresa Del Oriente's road to popularity.

In early 2011, announced several tours and shows to Colombia (Barranquilla), Venezuela (Barquisimeto, Caracas and Maracaibo) and Mexico (Mexico City) in this year and the 19 February 2011 was presented at the Teatro Amira de la Rosa (Barranquilla), as a guest on "El Carnaval de las Artes". Where he and a musical show A with the audience. Same story was reviewed by the Colombian media as Caracol TV, RCN and print as El Tiempo, El Espectador, among others. Tigress was also invited to the program "Viva la Alegría" and "Ella es Niurka" Mexican channel Azteca 13, 23 February 2011, as a special artist. This is the second time Bustos visit Mexico City. To be presented later in Venezuela. That same year he visited Chile, United States, Egypt and Israel.

=== New brighter day (English version of Nuevo amanecer) ===
La Tigresa del Oriente, announced both on Peruvian television and in their social networks, was working on the musical recording of the new English version of her song Nuevo amanecer. The song is accompanied by the Peruvian group Rhythm, where the song title has the name New brighter day.

== Collaborations ==
In 2009, she worked with El Pimpo Man in the theme "El Swing de la Gata".

In April 2010 Tigresa del Oriente released the song "En tus Tierras Bailaré" with Wendy Sulca and Delfin Quishpe. The song received attention in Latin American media and got rapidly more than one million hits in a few weeks. The song has later been called a "Youtube We are the World" by Calle 13 singer Residente.

The interpreter also collaborated with Argentine singer Coco, in the video "No hay que discriminar", released on 10 June 2010. Himself is a slogan against discrimination, homophobia and racism. The clip also gained notoriety and was reviewed by the various media of the gay community including Spain, Mexico and Peru. In addition it is planned in the Gay Pride march in Argentina at the end of that month.

Other musical collaborations have been with the rock group Midas and his hit "Ella me provoca" and most recently with Dante Spinetta next to Residente Calle 13, and Wendy Sulca y Andrés Calamaro video for "Pa' tras". In addition to the English version of 'Beat It', with Los Terapeutas del Ritmo.

== Criticism ==
La Tigresa's stage act evokes strong reactions from the general public in Latin America. Critics denounce her stage act as campy (at best) or kitsch (at worst) and make fun of her appearance and lack of formal vocal training. The comments left about her imply, according to columnist Rafael Robles from the Peruvian newspaper La República, that she reached this level due to a social joke more than talent.

She has also generated controversy for statements that she has given, which says that the singer Lady Gaga has copied her animal print style, in the video for the singer, titled "Telephone" (a duet with Beyoncé) and other details Judith has been revealed in various interviews.
