= Rosa Arciniega =

Peruvian novelist

- Born: Rosa Amalia Arciniega de la Torre; October 18, 1909; Lima, Peru
- Died: 1999; Buenos Aires, Argentina
- Occupations: Novelist, essayist, journalist
- Known for: Avant-garde Peruvian writer and feminist
- Notable work: Engranajes, Mosko-Strom
- Movement: Feminism

Rosa Arciniega (born perhaps 1903, 1908, or 1909 in Lima; died 1999 in Argentina) was a Peruvian novelist with a Socialist bent. She was a pioneer of women's rights, and belonged to the generation of left-leaning intellectuals led by José Carlos Mariátegui.

As a young person, she traveled to Spain (where she published many of her works), affiliated herself with the Socialist party, and began her work as a journalist. She got married in 1924, and in 1936 she returned to Peru, at the beginning of the Spanish Civil War.

She is principally known for her biographies and several novels.

Her third novel, the 1933 dystopian Mosko-Strom. El torbellino de las grandes metrópolis, depicts a noisy mechanical world that worships progress and is indifferent to the welfare of human beings.

== Sources ==
- Mosko-strom: el torbellino de las grandes metropolis : novela, 1934 edition (second edition) on Google Books.
- WorldCat listing of the 1934 edition (second edition) of Mosko-Strom.
- La novela distópica de 1933 que anunciaba las urgencias del mundo de 2018, El País, 22 March 2019; discusses the resurging interest in Mosko-Strom.
- Libreria Sur showing that Mosko-Strom has been reissued in 2019.
- Terrores Vanguardistas: el miedo a la modernidad y la «llamada al orden» by Esperanza López Parada, in A través de la vanguardia hispanoamericana, ed. Manuel Fuentes and Paco Tovar, 2011, pp. 563 - 571, discusses Rosa Arciniega.
- La Mujer Nueva americana en España: Rosa Arciniega by María del Carmen Simón Palmer, in Mosaico transatlántico: Escritoras, artistas e imaginarios (España-EEUU, 1830-1940), ed. Beatriz Ferrús and Alba del Pozo, 2017, unpaginated ebook.
- Spanish-American Literature: A History, by Enrique Anderson Imbert, 1969, p. 652, briefly discusses the 1931 novel Engranajes, in addition to Mosko-Strom.
