= Carlos Olascuaga =

Peruvian footballer (born 1992)

Personal information
- Full name: Carlos Dante Olascuaga Viera
- Date of birth: July 22, 1992 (age 34)
- Place of birth: Lima, Peru
- Height: 1.75 m (5 ft 9 in)
- Position: Winger

Youth career
- 2005–2008: Universitario
- 2008–2010: Alianza Lima

Senior career*
Years	Team	Apps	(Gls)
2008–2011	Alianza Lima	6	(0)
2011	→ Cienciano (loan)	22	(4)
2012–2016	Universitario	63	(6)
2014–2015	→ Académica (loan)	5	(1)
2016	Juan Aurich	20	(2)
2016–2017	Universidad César Vallejo	55	(10)
2018	Sport Rosario	37	(6)
2019	Sport Boys	5	(0)
2019	Universitario	6	(0)
2020-2022	Ayacucho FC	60	(8)
2023	Deportivo Municipal	11	(1)
- * Club domestic league appearances and goals as of 22:38, 5 May 2020 (UTC)

Carlos Dante Olascuaga Viera (born 22 July 1992) is a former Peruvian footballer who played as a winger.

== Club career ==
He was promoted to the Alianza Lima first team in 2008 by Richard Páez along with his team-mates Aldo Corzo and Félix Goyzueta. His official debut was against Coronel Bolognesi FC in a 1-2 loss for his side. He also played for the Alianza Lima U20 side.

In January 2011, Olascuaga was loaned out to Cienciano for the start of 2011 season. On 21 February 2011 he made his debut for Cienciano in Cusco against Sport Boys. Olascuaga entered the match in the 62nd minute replacing Fernando Masías, which ended in a 3-0 win for Cienciano. On 11 May 2011 Olascuaga scored his first professional goal in the 3rd minute in a home match against Juan Aurich, which ended 2-1 in favor of Cienciano.

In July 2014, Olascuaga was loaned to Portuguese side Académica for 12 months. He made his official debut against Sporting CP in a Primeira Liga match. On 4 February, he scored his first, and only, goal against União da Madeira.

== Honours ==
=== Club ===
Universitario de Deportes

- Torneo Descentralizado (1): 2013

Ayacucho FC

- 2020 Fase 2
