= Luis Redher =

Peruvian footballer (born 1964)

Personal information
- Full name: Luis Alberto Redher Espinosa
- Date of birth: 27 August 1964 (age 62)
- Place of birth: Lima, Peru
- Position: Midfielder

Senior career*
Years	Team	Apps	(Gls)
–1989	Sporting Cristal		
1989–1990	Real Zaragoza	5	(0)
- Alianza Lima
- * Club domestic league appearances and goals

Luis Alberto Redher Espinosa (born 27 August 1964) is a Peruvian former footballer who played for Real Zaragoza in Spain during the 1989–90 season. He also played for Sporting Cristal and Alianza Lima.
