= Javier Tapia =

Peruvian-born artist (born 1957)

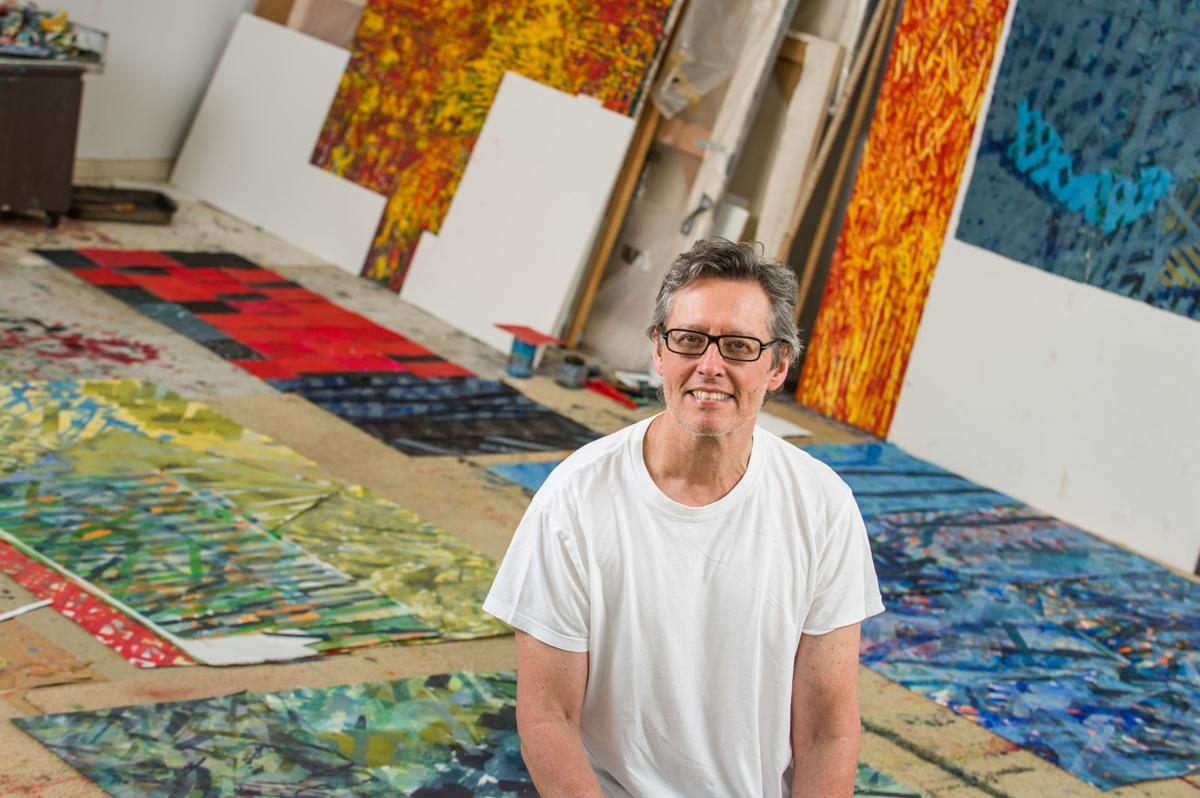
- Born: 1957 (age 68–69); Lima, Peru
- Known for: Artist, Watercolors Painter
- Notable work: The Gap, Back to the Ranch, Untitled, On the Road to Mount San Victoire, With the Wrong We See, The Great Intruder
- Website: https://www.mutualart.com/Artist/Javier-Tapia/F93F3E1618CAC9B1

Javier Tapia (born 1957) is a Peruvian artist and painter.

== Biography ==
Javier Tapia was born in 1957 in Lima, Peru, and grew up in a period of upheaval when guerrilla warfare dominated political and social movements across the country. He moved to the United States in the 1980s, witnessing various phases of humanity: good and evil, intellectual and primitive, connected and separate. Tapia takes these studio themes as abstract shapes and broad strokes to serve as a metaphor for chaos and control, or structure and disorder. In the tradition of the Peruvian Textile, he overlaps, subtracts, and reworks the watercolors, flipping the paper out as bold colors emerge like carvings. The active ingredients emit physically; Work becomes energetic, on the verge of chaos, but organized in the constraints of paperwork. He currently lives in Richmond, Virginia and works in the Virginia Commonwealth University's Faculty of Painting and Print Production, where he has been teaching since 1988.

== Education ==
From 1984 to 1987, Tapia studied at the University of Texas at Austin, where he earned his Bachelor of Fine Arts and Master of Fine Arts and was a recipient of a Presidential Scholarship.

In 2015, Tapia worked as an associate professor in the Faculty of Fine Arts and Typography at Virginia Commonwealth University.

In 2019, Tapia joined the staff of Virginia Commonwealth University. The school has also exhibited the department's art to view Javier's work.

== Artworks ==
Drawings and Paintings
Artwork Name	Size	Medium	year
Untitled	24 x 31 in	watercolor on paper	2018
Untitled 2	52 x 82 in	watercolor on paper	2012
Buscando Peyotl	200 x 300 cm	Oil on two canvases	2009 - 2010
Mambo del Parque O 'Higgins	150 x 150 cm	Mixed media on canvas	2008
Envy is everywhere	130 x 150 cm	Mixed media on canvas	2007
Bagual	150 x 150 cm	Oil on canvas	2008
Chambucha al aguaire	150 x 150 cm	Oil on canvas	2007
Two Sculptures on a Cave	150 x 180 cm	Oil on canvas	2007
Back in the ranch	150×180 cm	Canvas	2008
Don Carlos I. Fundo	150×180 cm	Oil and acrylic on canvas	2008
“EST 005” and “EST 011”	50×40 cm	Acrylic on canvas	2020
Untitled 3	100 x 80 cm	Oil on canvas	2012
Untitled 4	60 x 66 in	Watercolor on Arches paper	2012
Untitled 5	60 x 66 in	Watercolor on Arches paper	2013
Untitled 6	52 x 82 in	Watercolor on Arches paper	2013
On the Road to Mount San Victoire	60 x 66 in	Watercolor on Arches paper	2014
With the Wrong We See	61 x 45 in	Watercolor on Arches paper	2016
The Great Intruder	40 x 66 in	Watercolor on Arches paper	2016
The Gap	40 x 66 in	Watercolor on Arches paper	2016
The Gift	18 x 72 in	Watercolor on Strathmore paper	2019 - 2020

== Exhibitions ==
Solo Shows
Exhibition	Organization	Location	Date
Javier Tapia: High Density: Fragments, Stories and Traditions	Galleri Christoffer Egelund	Copenhagen, Denmark	APR 17,2015 - MAY 16,2015

Group Shows
Exhibition	Organization	Location	Date
Isabel Bigelow and Javier Tapia	Anthony Reynolds Gallery	London, United Kingdom	DEC 05, 2008 - JAN 17, 2009
Echo	Galleri Christoffer Egelund	Copenhagen, Denmark	APR 19,2013 - MAY 11,2013
SUMMERTIME'13	Galleri Christoffer Egelund	Copenhagen, Denmark	JUN 20,2013 - AUG 10,2013
Summertime 14: The Big Annual Group Show	Galleri Christoffer Egelund	Copenhagen, Denmark	JUN 06,2014 - AUG 16,2014
Travelling Dust	18th Street Arts Center	Santa Monica, Los Angeles, CA, US	NOV 07,2014 - DEC 12,2014
Good fortune, No blame	Galleri Christoffer Egelund	Copenhagen, Denmark	NOV 11,2016 - DEC 17,2016
A Decolonial Atlas: Strategies in Contemporary Art of the Americas	Vincent Price Art Museum	Monterey Park, California, USA.	APR 22,2017 - JUL 22,2017
A Decolonial Atlas: Strategies in Contemporary Art of the Americas	Tufts University Art Gallery	Medford, Massachusetts, US	JAN 16,2018 - APR 15,2018

Tapia does not have a specific collection because he also collaborates with other artists on numerous exhibitions. He has more exhibited at the Embassy Art Gallery of Peru, Washington, DC; Museo de Osma, Barranco, Peru; Bloom Galleries, Milan, Italy; Hunt Galleries at Mary Baldwin College, Staunton, Virginia; 1708 Gallery, and Anderson Gallery, both, Richmond, Virginia. With him he participated in the Strategies in Contemporary Art of the Americas in Vincent Price Art Museum exhibition. along with colleagues whose works are tied to the legacy of colonialism and challenge the dominant, accepted stories.

== Books ==
Published Books
Year	Title	Author	Publisher	Ref
2015	Ergentium	Javier Tapia, Eduardo Tapia	CreateSpace Independent Publishing Platform, 2015	

== Bibliography ==
Tapia, Javier, and Museo Pedro De Osma. "Javier Tapia En El Museo Pedro De Osma : Acuarelas : 6 De Julio-6 De Agosto Del 2000". Lima, Perú: Museo Pedro De Osma, 2000. Last modified August 6, 2000. https://primo.getty.edu/permalink/f/19q6gmb/GETTY_ALMA21133183980001551

Tapia, Javier. "The Schooling of Puerto Ricans: Philadelphia's Most Impoverished Community." Anthropology & Education Quarterly 29, no. 3 (1998): 297-323. Last modified September 1, 1998. https://imf-primo.hosted.exlibrisgroup.com/permalink/f/1thbp2d/TN_cdi_crossref_primary_10_1525_aeq_1998_29_3_297

Amano-Dolan, Christina. "VCUarts professor accused of racial profiling will not return to teaching this year". The Common Wealth Times. Last Modified August 21, 2019. https://commonwealthtimes.org/2019/08/21/vcuarts-professor-accused-of-racial-profiling-will-not-return-to-teaching-this-year/
