= Benjamín Castañeda =

Peruvian composer and teacher of music

Benjamín Castañeda Garrido (31 March 1846, Lima – 26 March 1913, Lima) was a Peruvian composer and teacher of music. His grammar of the Cantonese dialect may have been the first attempt published.

== Early life ==
Castañeda was born in Lima, the son of José Domingo Castañeda Salcedo and Rosa Ramona Garrido. He was educated in Lima at the seminary of Santo Toribio and began his piano training with a Prof. Nussart, a Frenchman. He went on to Nice, France, to study under Czech pianist Josef Proksch and his son Theodor. He is reputed to have been one of the first to introduce the music of Chopin to Lima, upon his return from France in 1865.

== Far East ==
Castañeda travelled to Japan and China in the late 1860s. His 137-page Cantonese grammar, the first ever such work published, appeared in Hong Kong in 1869, followed the next year with a report on Japan-China trade published in Lima. In 1877, his third work on the region, featuring Kwantung (Guangzhou) and Fukien (Fujian) Provinces, was published.

== Return to Lima ==
Having returned to Peru, for about thirty years he was the most sought-after piano teacher, having among his most prominent pupils José María Valle Riestra. He composed a Tratado de armonía (Treaty of Harmony) for the education of his children, refusing its publication. He married distinguished Lima pianist Maria Luisa Scotland (who survived him by 32 years).

== Compositions ==
Among his musical compositions are: Marcha nupcial (1871), Polka Ristori (1874), galopa Las regatas (1874), Funeral March, in honour of Francisco de Paula Vigil (1875), polca La feria (1876) and Corina Walz (1878).
