= Gabriel Rimachi Sialer =

Gabriel Rimachi Sialer (1974 in Lima) is a Peruvian writer, journalist, and archeologist.

Gabriel Rimachi Sialer is the author of the short story books Despertares nocturnos (2000), Canto en el infierno (2001), El color del camaleón (2005); El cazador de dinosaurios (2009); La sangrienta noche del cuervo (2011); La increíble historia del Capitán Ostra (2020); and Historias extraordinarias (2020). His stories have been published in the anthologies Asamblea portátil. Muestrario de narradores iberoamericanos (2009); El bosque imaginario. Antología binacional Perú–Ecuador (2010); King, homenaje hispanoamericano al rey del terror (2014); Mario y los escribidores. 27 relatos sobre el universo vargasllosiano (2019), Cuarentena. Historias para no salir de casa (2020), among others. He has run creative writing workshops in the city of Lima since 2005. In 2009 the publishing house Ediciones Altazor published a compendium of his best short stories titled El cazador de dinosaurios, highlighted among the best installments of that year by the newspaper El Comercio.

As an editor Rimachi Sialer has published the short story anthology Nacimos para perder (2007); y los ahora clásicos 17 fantásticos cuentos peruanos Vol. I (2008); y 17 fantásticos cuentos peruanos Vol. II (2012), which was named the best short story book of 2008 in Peru.

In 2010 he obtained the Scholarship for Literary Residence of the Grand Duchy of Luxembourg. In 2012 his short story Al morir la noche was selected by The Barcelona Review as the best story published on its pages during that year. In 2013, he was considered by the critic and researcher Ricardo González Vigil among the best storytellers of the decade in the national anthology El cuento peruano 2001-2010, edited by Ediciones Copé de Petroperú.

Rimachi Sialer is currently the editor of the publishing house Casatomada.
