= Wynnie Mynerva =

Peruvian multidisciplinary artist

Wynnie Mynerva (born 1993) is a multidisciplinary artist, with work spanning from painting, performance, video, and installation. Their work explores gender and sexuality while challenging political and religious concepts.

Born in the outskirts of Lima, Peru in Villa El Salvador, Mynerva was exposed to heightened political rife and violence towards gender, sexuality and social class. Their parents both migrated from Huarez, Peru alone when they were young children, and began earning money through cleaning houses and cars. Their parents met and built their house in the middle of Villa El Salvador, unknowing of the tumultuous culture of the capital city of Peru. Once born, Mynerva also contributed to building their house. First with matting, then of wood and finally adding cement to the structure. In an interview with Gabriela Wiener, Mynerva mentions El Salvador "represents the strength from which [they] come", and that it taught them how to "grow a plant in quicksand," which is why they feel that "there are very few impossible things".

Mynerva graduated from Bellas Art University in Lima, Peru, and followed in their parents' footsteps and migrated herself first to the United States, without being able to speak English or knowing how to write. They became the first woman in their family to earn money outside of domestic working when they exhibited art at the New Museum.

== Art ==
Mynerva uses her art as a cathartic expression of her trauma, desires and oppressive childhood experiences. Their art refuses to accept patriarchal schemes and conform to conventional, heterosexual standards imposed by society; it seeks to depict a world where sexual power is political power, and is praised as such. Their art reconstructs femininity through challenging religious themes, patriarchal norms, and sexual fantasies and by illustrating these concepts in a completely unique way.

=== Sweet Castrator at LatchKey Gallery ===
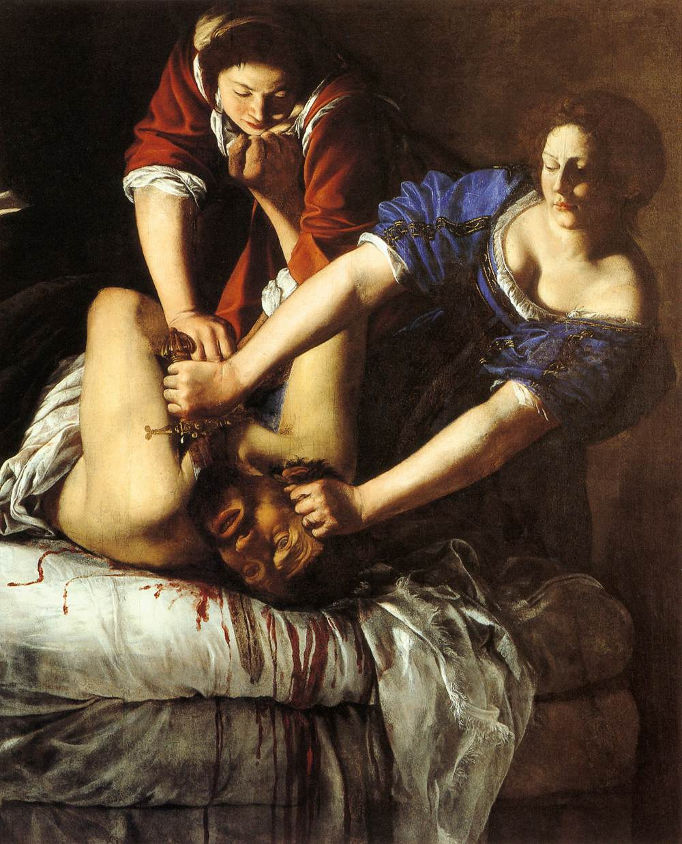
By Artemisia Gentileschi, circa 1620. A grotesque but compelling Baroque piece by one of the only known female artists from that time.

Mynerva's first solo exhibition in the United States was her painting and installation at LatchKey Gallery in New York. This gallery is an encapsulation of their own relationship with her past, and present day body as well as the religious and societal contributions to sexual stigma. The collection of paintings which depict their own sexual trauma, and protest the culture of male-inflicted sexual violence in Peru, and worldwide is split into two acts. Act one compromises the first half of the gallery and reflects Mynerva's memories of their sexual experiences from their past. Act two represents their present-day empowered sense of self displayed in three mural sized canvases. Some works include All My Tears (act one), which renders a naked figure huddled underneath a man ejaculating behind them, as well as Story of Revenge (act two), which reimagines Gentilleschi's Judith Slaying Holofernes (1612–13) as an onslaught on a man by two nude women with a kitchen knife. Mynerva's exploration of male torment through past experiences, biblical stories, and current perception creates an encapsulating accumulation of the female experience, and prompts a complete reconsideration of societal standards which have led us there.

=== The Original Riot at New Museum ===
Their first solo museum exhibition in the United States was The Original Riot, at New Museum in New York. As Mynerva's painting spanned the entire gallery, it was the museum's largest ever exhibition. It also included a sculpture replica of Mynerva's own rib, which they had surgically removed as part of their artistic involvement. This exhibition reimagines the story of Adam and Eve, hence why they had their "Adam's rib" removed. The huge painting depicts Eve giving Lilith her lowest "Adam's rib" bone, in an act of defying patriarchal power.

=== Dust of Love at Société ===
Mynerva's first solo exhibition in Germany is Dust of Love, which draws upon her personal experiences relating to violence within spaces of gender, race and sexuality. Mynerva's multidisciplinary practice is showcased in this exhibition, as it includes painting, video and body modifications. As it dissects the complex emotion of love, the installation challenges normative configurations of love and presents alternative conceptions of body and sexuality.
