= Richard Chávez =

Peruvian footballer (born 2000)

Personal information
- Full name: Richard Eusebio Chávez Chonate
- Date of birth: 12 December 2000 (age 25)
- Place of birth: Callao, Peru
- Height: 1.75 m (5 ft 9 in)
- Position: Midfielder

Youth career
- 2014–2019: César Vallejo

Senior career*
Years	Team	Apps	(Gls)
2020–2022	Carlos A. Mannucci	13	(0)
2022	→ Comerciantes (loan)	20	(2)
2023	Deportivo Llacuabamba	18	(1)
2024	Deportivo Coopsol	7	(0)
2024	Nuevo San Cristobal		
- * Club domestic league appearances and goals as of 21:49, 21 September 2024 (UTC)

Richard Eusebio Chávez Chonate (born 12 December 2000) is a Peruvian footballer who plays as a midfielder.

== Career ==
=== Club career ===
After five years at César Vallejo, Chávez moved to Peruvian Primera División side Carlos A. Mannucci for the 2020 season to get closer to professional football. He got his official debut on 2 February 2020 against FC Carlos Stein. Chávez was in the starting lineup but was replaced in the 73rd minute.

On 5 August 2020, his contract with Carlos A. Mannucci was extended until the end of 2023, after having played four games for the club. At the end of February 2022, Chávez was loaned out to Peruvian Segunda División club Comerciantes Unidos.

In January 2023, Chávez joined Peruvian Segunda División side Deportivo Llacuabamba. In March 2024, he signed with Deportivo Coopsol.

At the end of October 2024, Chávez moved to Peruvian Tercera División side Nuevo San Cristobal.
