= Ricky Tosso =

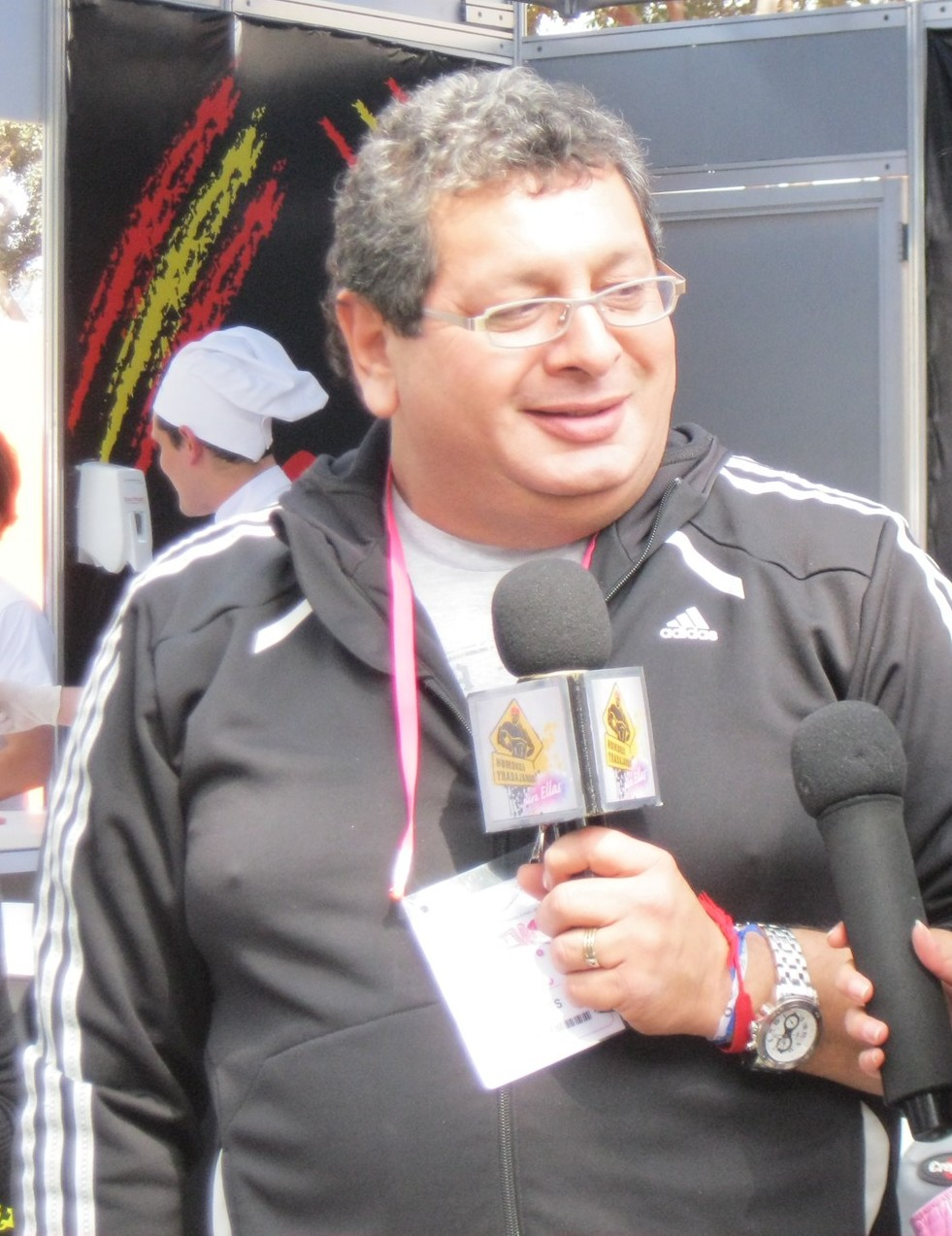
- Ricky Tosso in a TV interview
- Born: Ricardo Tosso Febres; 21 February 1960; Arequipa, Peru
- Died: 11 September 2016 (aged 56)
- Occupation: Actor

Ricardo "Ricky" Tosso Febres (February 21, 1960 – September 11, 2016) was a Peruvian actor born in Arequipa.

He started acting when he was 4 years old and appeared on many Peruvian TV shows during his career. He is the son of Ricardo Tosso, a well-known Peruvian actor and Angélica Febres.

His TV program Teatro desde el Teatro has become a classic of Peruvian television. In 2010 he appeared in the play El Enfermo Imaginario. On 11 September 2016, he died at the age of 56 from cancer.

== Career ==
- 1964-1967 - Mipayachi (PANTEL)
- 1977 - Mi Barrio (PANTEL)
- 1981 - El Show de Rulito y Sonia (America TV)
- 1983 - Tulio de America a Cholocolor (America TV)
- 1984-1985 - Los Detectilocos (America TV)
- 1988 - El Agente Fantastico (PANTEL)
- 1988 - Supercatonicomicos (PANTEL)
- 1989 - El Club de Ricky (PANTEL)
- 1989 - La Maquina de la Risa (America TV)
- 1990 - El Super Club de Ricky (RBC)
- 1993-1997 - Risas y Salsa (PANTEL)
- 1997 - Leonela (America TV)
- 1998-1999 - Risas de America (America TV)
- 1999 - Isabela (America TV)
- 2000 - Bia, Bia, Bia (Frecuencia Latina)
- 2001 - Vale la Pena Soñar (Frecuencia Latina)
- 2002–2008 - Teatro desde el Teatro (America TV)
- 2004 - Muero por Muriel (Iguana Productions)
- 2008 - El circo de Ricky y sus estrellas de la tele (Circo)
