= Samuel Brejar =

French poet (1941–2006)

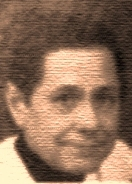
Samuel Brejar

Samuel Brejar born Gilberto Yabar-Valdez (Lima, Peru, July 28, 1941 – 2006) was a French poet who was born in Peru. Samuel Brejar is the pseudonym of Gilberto Yabar-Valdez.

== Early life ==
Samuel Brejar was born in Lima, Peru, on July 28, 1941. He was the grandson of Orihuelo-Yabar, a well-known and wealthy landowner in the Andes of southern Peru. His paternal origins were a mix of Spanish and Italian ancestry. On hIs maternal side, Brejar was part Quechua (i.e., Native Americans of Peru).

Brejar studied with the Jesuits in Lima. When his father died in a car accident while he was 16, he had to start working and pursue his studies in the evening. This taught him about the harsh reality faced by Peru's working class. This period may explain his communist political commitments. In addition, he changed his birth certificate in order to avoid military service.

He soon suffered the consequences of his political commitments, as he was imprisoned and tortured. On several occasions, he was arrested in Lima and went into exile in Chile or Argentina.

In the early 1970s, Brejar moved to Mexico where he met Noëlle Vuillermoz, a French student in ethno-history. They fell in love and he settled in France. They lived a few years in Paris and in Brittany.

Brejar was friends with Mexican poet Francisco Azuela. Brejar died in October 2006.

== Poetry and theatre ==
The purpose of Brejar's life was to write poetry and theatre. In Peru and Mexico, he had the opportunity to publish his first poems (e.g., "Todas las mordazas", 1965, "Hallazgos del comportamiento raro", 1967, "Legajos del archivista", 1969, "Los cantos destruidos", 1970, "Cuentero del duende", 1971, "Palabras matadas", 1972). However, in France Brejar wrote most of his poetic and theatrical works.

Poetry: "Writings of the Andean", 1978, "The Exiliades", 1981, "Slang of the Horde", 1983, "Ariel archives", 1985, "Book of words", 1992, "Qori Kontur", 2001.

Theatre: "Zeal for the summer", 1983, "The crocodiles massager" 1984, "The Kings empty-handed", 1985, "The night", 1989, "silence", "A fall afternoon Songe". The last two were unpublished.

== Journals ==
From June 1993 to December 2006, Samuel Brejar published Rimbaud Revue (i.e., semi-annual journal of international literature) in collaboration with his wife Noëlle Yabar-Valdez. Rimbaud Revue focused on new poets and writers, Spanish or French work from Europe or Latin America with poems, essays, studies, critics, chronics, stories, interviews, translations, reproductions of contemporary art, presentation of books and other revues.

== Reception ==
- Philippe Saubadine: "It’s a true native American requiem that Samuel Brejar creates with his lamentations and his grief of Ota¬ranta, protective soul of the clans, whose saga searches in the heart of memory to extricate sacrifices and massacres together in finding powerless and premonitory vocation." (1)
- Jean Breton: "Qori Kontur is a complex creation that enlightens us on what must be the experience of exile." (2)
- Roland Counard: "We celebrate the excellence of Rimbaud Revue." (3)
- Karel Hadek: "We much regret the decision of Samuel Brejar to end the publication of Rimbaud Revue which was undoubtedly a revue of majeure importance." (4)
