= Dangelo Valencia =

Peruvian footballer (born 1999)

Personal information
- Full name: Dangelo Stéfano Valencia Chávez
- Date of birth: 16 May 1999 (age 27)
- Place of birth: Lima, Peru
- Height: 1.70 m (5 ft 7 in)
- Position: Full-back

Youth career
- Deportivo Municipal
- Carlos A. Mannucci

Senior career*
Years	Team	Apps	(Gls)
2019–2021	Carlos A. Mannucci	6	(0)
2021	Deportivo Llacuabamba	18	(1)
2022–2023	Sport Chavelines		
2024–201?	Sport Machete		
- * Club domestic league appearances and goals as of 18:04, 23 August 2023 (UTC)

Dangelo Stéfano Valencia Chávez (born 16 May 1999) is a Peruvian footballer who plays as a full-back.

== Career ==
=== Club career ===
Valencia joined Carlos A. Mannucci from Deportivo Municipal. He got his professional debut for Carlos A. Mannucci in the Peruvian Primera División on 24 March 2019 against Universidad de San Martín. Valencia was in the starting lineup but was replaced by Diego Manicero in the half time. He made a total of six appearances during the 2019 season.

On 1 April 2021, Valencia joined Peruvian Segunda División side Deportivo Llacuabamba. On 1 March 2022, he moved to fellow league club Sport Chavelines.

In 2024, Valencia played for Sport Machete.
