= Frágil (band) =

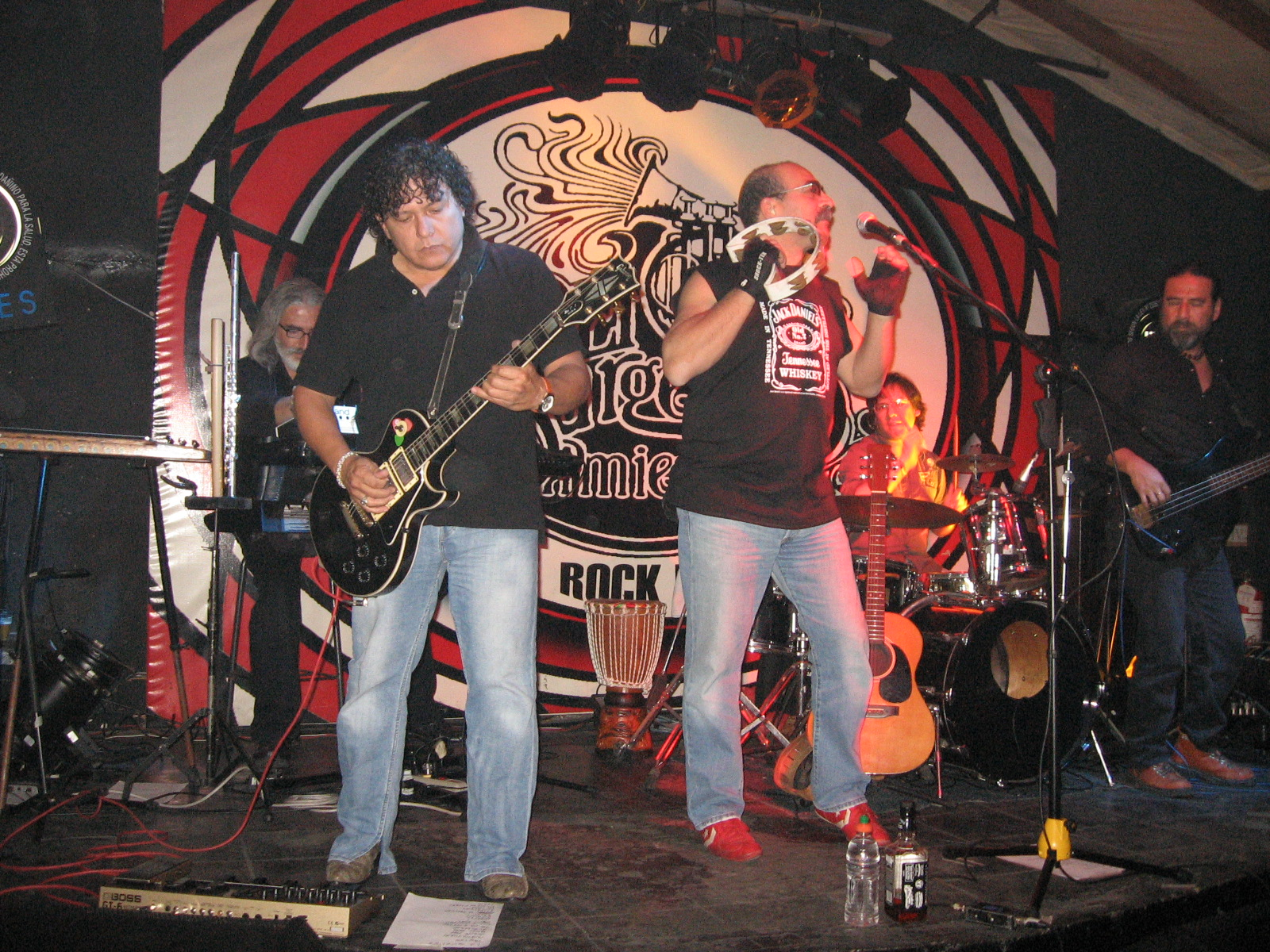
- Frágil in 2007

Background information
- Origin: Lima, Peru
- Genres: Progressive rock, symphonic rock, hard rock
- Years active: 1970–present
- Members: César Bustamante; Octavio Castillo; Andrés Dulude; Jorge Duránd; Luis Valderrama
- Website: www.fragilperu.com (defunct)

Frágil is a Peruvian rock band. Named after an eponymous Yes album (Fragile), Fragil started as a symphonic progressive/hard rock band influenced by Yes, Genesis, Emerson, Lake & Palmer, Jethro Tull, Black Sabbath, and Rainbow. They earned local fame through their single Av. Larco in the early 1980s.

== Band members ==
- César Bustamante: (Rickenbacker 4001S bass, 12-string guitar, Peruvian percussion, piano, synthesisers, Korg MS-20, organ, mellotron, ARP OMNI, acoustic guitar, keyboards and backing vocals)
- Octavio Castillo: Keyboards (Korg MS-20, Ensoniq, Arp OMNI, Piano, Hammond B3), flute, bass, steel guitar, mandolin, quena, ocarina, Peruvian percussion and backing vocals)
- Andrés Dulude: (vocals, 12 and 6-string guitars, acoustic guitar)
- Jorge Duránd: (Yamaha drumset, percussion, Peruvian percussion and backing vocals)
- Luis Valderrama: (Gibson Les Paul guitar, mandolin)
- Alex Rojas: lead and backing vocals.

== Former members and freelancers ==
- Jose Eduardo Coello (drums, percussion) (1970–1972)
- Arturo Creamer (drums 1978–1983) – 1 album recorded
- Harry Antón (drums 1972–1978 and 1984–1985) – 1 single recorded
- Armando Pattroni (drums 1986, 2010, 2019)
- Luis Salazar (guitars 1984–1985)
- Giuliana Villanueva (lead vocals 1985–1986)
- Franjo Antich (vocals 1982)
- Piñín Folgado (vocals 1984–1985) – 1 single recorded
- Jorge Pardo Valdespino (vocals 1994–1995)
- Santino Delatore (vocals 1996–1998) – 1 album recorded

== Discography ==
- Av. Larco (Arturo Creamer / Drums and Percussion) (1980)
- La nave blanca / Alrededor - 45 RPM single - (Piñín Folgado, Vocals / Harry Antón, Drums)
- Serranio (1989)
- Frágil (Compilation) (1990) Remastered (2007)
- Cuento Real (1992) Remastered (2007)
- Alunado (Santino de la Torre / Vocals) (1995)
- Sorpresa del Tiempo (Live with the Philharmonic Orchestra of Lima) (2003)
