= Félix Goyzueta =

Peruvian footballer (born 1991)

Personal information
- Full name: Félix Martín Goyzueta Romero
- Date of birth: January 3, 1991 (age 35)
- Place of birth: Pisco, Peru
- Height: 1.75 m (5 ft 9 in)
- Position: Center back

Team information
- Current team: Sport Áncash
- Number: 23

Youth career
- Alianza Lima

Senior career*
Years	Team	Apps	(Gls)
2008–2010	Alianza Lima	0	(0)
2011–2012	Cobresol FBC	2	(0)
2013–	Sport Áncash	3	(0)
- * Club domestic league appearances and goals as of June 2, 2013

Felix Goyzueta (born 3 January 1991) is a Peruvian footballer who plays as a center back for Sport Áncash in the Peruvian Segunda Division.

== Career ==
Born in Pisco, Goyzueta began playing football with Alianza Lima. He was promoted to the first team in 2008 by coach Richard Páez, along with his team-mates Aldo Corzo and Carlos Olascuaga where he never played an official match. By 2011, he was transferred to Cobresol FBC where he made his only two Peruvian Primera División appearances in the last two rounds of the 2011 tournament.
