= Leonardo Ruíz =

Peruvian footballer (born 2000)

Personal information
- Full name: José Leonardo Ruiz Alegría
- Date of birth: 25 July 2000 (age 26)
- Place of birth: Lima, Peru
- Height: 1.80 m (5 ft 11 in)
- Position: Forward

Youth career
- Sport Boys

Senior career*
Years	Team	Apps	(Gls)
2020	Sport Boys	9	(0)
2022	Vilavelhense	0	(0)
2022	União Mogi	1	(0)
2022–2023	Deportivo Llacuabamba	0	(0)
- * Club domestic league appearances and goals as of 11:29, 22 December 2020 (UTC)

José Leonardo Ruiz Alegría (born 25 July 2000) is a Peruvian footballer who plays as a forward.

== Career ==
=== Sport Boys ===
After a good season as top scorer for Sport Boys' reserve team with 10 goals in the 2019 season, he was promoted to the first team squad in January 2020. He got his official debut for Sport Boys on 15 February 2020 against Carlos A. Mannucci. Ruíz started on the bench, before replacing Eduardo Uribe in the 68th minute. He left the club at the end of 2020.

=== Brazil ===
In the beginning of 2022, Ruíz played for Brazilian club Vilavelhense. In April 2022, he moved to fellow country club, União Mogi.

=== Return to Peru ===
In the beginning of 2023, Ruíz joined Peruvian Segunda División side Deportivo Llacuabamba.
