= Jhojan Dominguez =

Peruvian footballer (born 2000)

Personal information
- Full name: Jhojan Humberto Dominguez Tasayco
- Date of birth: 9 July 2000 (age 26)
- Place of birth: Lima, Peru
- Height: 1.70 m (5 ft 7 in)
- Position: Winger

Team information
- Current team: Alianza Universidad

Youth career
- CD Pacífico
- 2016–2019: Deportivo Municipal

Senior career*
Years	Team	Apps	(Gls)
2020–2021	Deportivo Municipal	20	(0)
2021	→ Unión Comercio (loan)	3	(0)
2022	CNI		
2023	Comerciantes FC	29	(3)
2024	ADT	4	(0)
2025	Comerciantes FC	21	(10)
2026–	Alianza Universidad	0	(0)
- * Club domestic league appearances and goals as of 18:18, 3 January 2026 (UTC)

Jhojan Humberto Dominguez Tasayco (born 9 July 2000) is a Peruvian footballer who plays as a winger for Alianza Universidad.

== Career ==
=== Club career ===
Dominguez joined Deportivo Municipal from CD Pacífico in 2016. On 10 February 2020, Dominguez got his official debut for Municipal in the Peruvian Primera División against UTC Cajamarca. Dominguez was in the starting lineup on the left wing, but was replaced after 65 minutes.

On 1 May 2021, Dominguez was loaned out to Peruvian Segunda División club Unión Comercio for the rest of 2021. He was left without contract at the end of 2021. After a spell at CNI in 2022, Dominguez moved to Comerciantes FC at the end of November 2022.

On 31 December 2023, Dominguez signed with Peruvian Primera División side Asociación Deportiva Tarma. Ahead of the 2025 season, he returned to Comerciantes FC.

At the end of December 2025, Dominguez signed with Alianza Universidad.
