= Teatro Canout =

Theatre in Lima, Peru

Coordinates: 12°06′29″S 77°01′48″W

Canout Theatre
- Teatro Canout
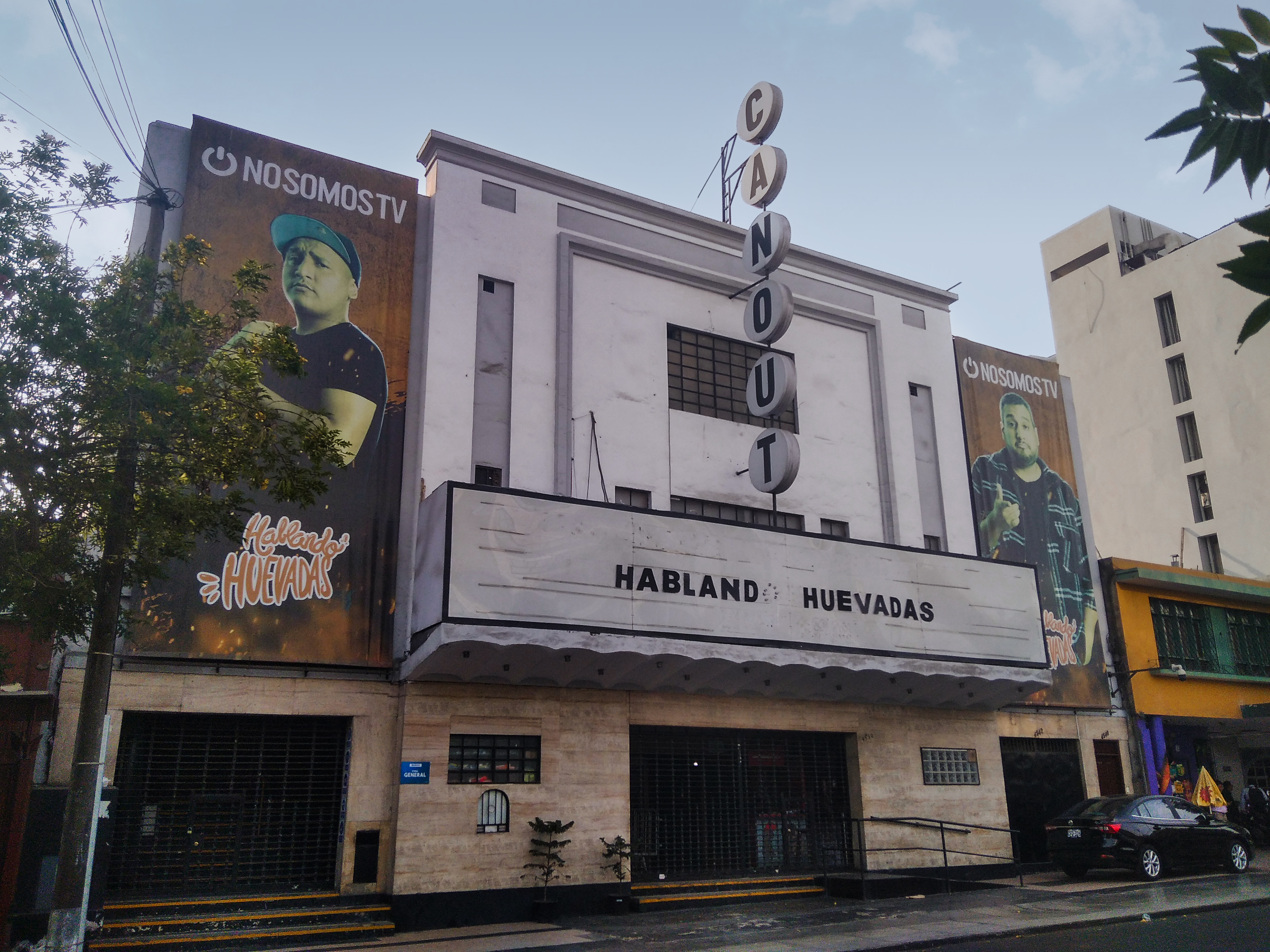
- Interactive map of Canout Theatre
- Address: Avenida Petit Thouars 4550
- Owner: Jorge Luna y Ricardo Mendoza
- Capacity: 1,000

Construction
- Opened: 24 March 1954

Website
- www.teatrocanout.pe

Canout Theatre (Spanish: Teatro Canout) is a theatre located at Petit Thouars Avenue in Miraflores District, Lima, Peru. It was inaugurated on March 24, 1954, as a cinema-theatre, and since then it has been the scene of a wide variety of shows, from film screenings to plays, concerts and cultural events. Once set to be closed and demolished in 2021 due to the economic effects of the then-ongoing COVID-19 pandemic in Peru, two local comedians saved the theatre by first renting and then and purchasing the building.

== History ==
The story of Canout begins in mid-1936, when Clara Canout Cevallos, widow of Muro, from Lima, daughter of a French engineer who settled in Peru after installing rice mills, made a promise to her father that she would make his surname last. in the time. Such a promise could be carried out thanks to the fact that she was co-heir to one of the largest fortunes in the department of Lambayeque, coming from her father-in-law, Francisco Muro Niño Ladrón de Guevara, a landowner in Ferreñafe. Under the financial support of the testamentary Muro, during a trip to Paris, Clara had the idea of installing a cinema-theatre behind her mansion that would bear her father's last name.

Since it opened its doors, the Canout experienced resounding success, becoming one of the most prominent cinema-theatres in Lima. In addition, various theatrical performances, concerts and cultural activities were offered on this stage. In 1979, the theatre underwent a transformation when it stopped showing films and became a dedicated exclusively to plays. Since then, it has been the scene of a wide variety of shows, from classic plays to independent productions.

In 2021, the theatre was on the verge of being demolished due to high maintenance costs and the inability of the then owner, Efraín Aguilar, to pay for them. However, it managed to be preserved thanks to the initiative of comedians Jorge Luna and Ricardo Mendoza, who rented the place to present and record their online show. Later, under the direction of their production company, they continued to perform other shows at the theatre. Finally, years later, they made its purchase official.

Currently, despite being a private property that serves as a venue for shows produced by its owners, the theatre is also rented for theatrical performances and various cultural events.

== See also ==
- Theatre in Peru
