= Aarón Valencia =

Peruvian footballer (born 2003)

Personal information
- Full name: Aarón Antony Valencia Valenzuela
- Date of birth: 1 June 2003 (age 23)
- Place of birth: Lima, Peru
- Position: Forward

Team information
- Current team: Sport Boys
- Number: 31

Youth career
- –2018: Sporting Cristal
- 2019–2021: Sport Boys

Senior career*
Years	Team	Apps	(Gls)
2021–	Sport Boys	2	(0)
- * Club domestic league appearances and goals as of 05:00, 19 August 2021 (UTC)

Aarón Antony Valencia Valenzuela (born 1 June 2003) is a Peruvian footballer who plays as a forward for Sport Boys.

== Career statistics ==
=== Club ===
As of 19 August 2021.

Club	Season	League			Cup		Continental		Other		Total	
Club	Season	Division	Apps	Goals	Apps	Goals	Apps	Goals	Apps	Goals	Apps	Goals
Sport Boys	2021	Peruvian Primera División	2	0	0	0	0	0	0	0	2	0
Career total			2	0	0	0	0	0	0	0	2	0
