= Santino De La Tore =

Peruvian musician and videographer (born 1973)

Santonio Delatore
- Born: Cesar Santino Delatore; June 6, 1973 (age 53); Lima, Peru
- Other names: Santino; SDLT
- Occupations: composer songwriter videographer vocalist
- Known for: Composing movie and television soundtracks
- Notable work: War of the Worlds; Prison Break; Homeland

Santino Delatore (born Cesar Santino Delatore, June 6, 1973, Lima, Peru), also known as Santino or SDLT, is a Peruvian musician, composer, songwriter, videographer and vocalist. He is best known for his music career in South America and his music placements in major Hollywood films and TV series, including Steven Spielberg's The War of the Worlds, and the TV series Prison Break, The Shield and Homeland.

== Early life ==
Santino Delatore was born Cesar Santino Delatore on June 6, 1973, in Lima, Peru. The youngest of five siblings, Santino was raised in a musical family. When he was a child, Santino joined his local Lima Cricket & Football Club. At 14, he was invited to play soccer professionally in Seattle, which he declinedto pursue music. At 18, Santino traveled to the Netherlands in search of record labels for his first band, Sentencia. At age 19, he joined the rock band Frágil.

== Music ==
=== 1987-1991: Sentencia debut ===
Santino's music career lifted off in the late eighties, with his debut appearance in the heavy metal band Sentencia. Santino recorded one album with the band before departing in 1991.

=== 1992-1997: Frágil and rise to fame ===
In 1992, Santino joined Frágil, South American progressive rock band. He remained the band's lead vocalist until 1997, when he decided to quit in order to "keep growing artistically". During the Frágil period, Santino toured both South America and the United States, appearing as a featured guest on Univision and Telemundo.He also now age 51 runs a music/singing/acting school called The Creative Factory.

=== 2002 – Present: Solo career and Hollywood placements ===
In 2002, the music industry veteran, Miles Copeland spotted Santino performing at a club in Los Angeles, and invited him to his castle in France to discuss his career. Per his suggestions, Santino launched his solo career. Santino's first solo album was released in 2005. Followed albums and solo projects, Santino became noted for his ability to infuse genres such as rock, rumba, reggae, trip hop, Latin, and jazz. Santino's music first caught the attention of Hollywood producers in 2005. Infierno was his debut placement, featured in Steven Spielberg's War of the Worlds in 2005.

== Music awards ==
Santino has received the Billboard Songwriting Award (2007) and the Icarus Prize (2009) for his contribution to Peruvian culture.

== Additional Projects ==
Santino went on to work as a producer and stage manager for Latin TV shows such as Trato Hecho, 12 Corazones, and El Tribunal Del Pueblo. He has directed over 100 music videos, establishing his own production company, SDLT Films.

== Discography ==
Release year	Album	Band/Project
1990	Hierro	Sentencia
1995	Alunado	Frágil
2006	Indiocumentado	Santino
2009	Llévame Contigo	Santino
Example	Latinocumentado	Example
2017	Sliding Roads	SDLT

== Music Placements ==
Film	Production
War of the Worlds	Paramount Pictures
Employee of the Month	Lionsgate
Win It All	Netflix
Gravy	Siren Digital - Hollywood

TV Series	Episode	Production
The Shield	Season 4 Episode 11	FOX
Prison Break	Season 3 Episode 3	FOX
America's Ballroom Challenge	Episode 101	PBS
Miami Medical	Episode 12	CBS
Chaos	Episode 104	CBS
Kidnapped	Season 1 Episode 12	NBC
The Glades	Episode 406	A&E Network
Alphas	Season 1 Episode 6	Syfy
Homeland	Episode 301	Showtime
Ray Donovan	Episode 301	Showtime
From Dusk Till Dawn	Episode 105	El Rey Network
Gang Related	Pilot Episode	FOX
Marvel's Luke Cage	Episode 112	Netflix

== TV Production ==
- Writer/Chief Writer/Associate Producer of El Tribunal del Pueblo (2000-2004)
- Writer/Chief Writer/Associate Producer of La Corte Familiar (2000-2004)
- Stage Manager/Assistant Director of Trato Hecho (2004-2006)
- Stage Manager of 12 Corazones (2006-2007)
- Producer of En La Zona - LATV Networks (2007 -2008)
- Producer of LATV en concierto - LATV Networks (2008-2009)
