= Liberato Kani =

Quechua-language hip-hop singer, songwriter

- Born: Lima, Peru
- Occupation: Singer-Songwriter
- Known for: Quechua-language hip-hop & rap, indigenous activism

Ricardo Flores Carrasco (Lima, Perú), known professionally as Liberato Kani, is a Quechua-language hip-hop singer and songwriter. Through his work, he is also a cultural and Indigenous Languages activist.

== Early life ==
Liberato Kani was born in the coastal city of Lima, growing up in San Juan de Lurigancho district. At the age of 9, his mother's death prompted him to move to Umamarca, Apurimac, located in Peru's highlands, where he lived with his paternal grandmother. While living in Apurimac he learned his family language, Southern Quechua and connected with Andean traditions. At the age of 13, Flores Carrasco returned to Lima where he finished high-school, attended college and started his music career.

== Musical career ==
At the age of 21, Flores Carrasco, was part of a hip-hop group called Quinta Rima. Then he became a soloist and adopted the professional name of Liberato Kani.

In 2016 he presented his first album Rimay Pueblo, which was internationally acclaimed, although it also faced criticism due the fusion of traditional Andean sounds with contemporary urban rhythms. He was able to perform at major arenas in Peru, including Teatro Nacional, Lima Book Fair, and Afuera Fest. In 2018 he made an international tour called Pawaspay (taking off, in Quechua) where he visited Chile, Spain, Cuba and the United States. In 2021 he launched his second album Pawaspay. In 2024, he did a six-city tour in the United States performing at shows across university campuses including Duke and Harvard among others.
