= José Bustamante (footballer, born 2000) =

Peruvian footballer

Personal information
- Full name: Francisco José Bustamante Abad
- Date of birth: 15 January 2000 (age 26)
- Place of birth: Lima, Peru
- Position: Forward

Team information
- Current team: Deportivo Llacuabamba
- Number: 29

Youth career
- –2020: Deportivo Llacuabamba

Senior career*
Years	Team	Apps	(Gls)
2020–	Deportivo Llacuabamba	4	(2)
- * Club domestic league appearances and goals as of 3 March 2020

José Bustamante (born 15 January 2000) is a Peruvian professional footballer who plays as a forward for Deportivo Llacuabamba.
