= Carlos Oneto =

Carlos Alberto Oneto Villavicencio (5 May 1929 – 1 April 2014) was a Peruvian actor, television personality, and comedian. He was known as Pantuflas (Slippers), and created the comedy group "EL Tornillo" ("The Screw").

Oneto died on 1 April 2014 in his native Lima, aged 84.

== Other websites ==
- Carlos Oneto at IMDb
