= Arturo Ferreyros =

Peruvian basketball player

Personal information
- Born: 12 October 1924; Lima, Peru
- Died: 2007 (aged 82–83)

Sport
- Sport: Basketball

Arturo Artemio Ferreyros Pérez (12 October 1924 – 2007) was a Peruvian basketball player. He competed in the men's tournament at the 1948 Summer Olympics.
