= Analí Cabrera =

Peruvian actress

- Born: Ana Luisa Cabrera Villarreal; 21 June 1959; Lima, Peru
- Died: 21 June 2011 (aged 52); Surquillo, Lima, Peru
- Other names: Chelita
- Occupations: Actress, vedette, athlete
- Years active: 1980–2011
- Spouses: Rodolfo Carrión (1982–1990); Luis Carrizales Stoll (1992–2004)

Ana Luisa Cabrera Villarreal (21 June 1959 – 21 June 2011), known by the stage name Analí Cabrera and also as Chelita, was a Peruvian actress, vedette, athlete, and dancer. She was part of the cast of the hit comedy television program Risas y salsa.

Her long and distinguished career was recognized and awarded by the Ministry of Labour and Promotion of Employment.

== Biography ==
=== Early years ===
Born on 21 June 1959 in Lima, Analí Cabrera was the eldest daughter of a family of 14. She belonged to the group Histrión in which, along with Adolfo Chuiman, she started in acting, although her first salaries were received as a café-théâtre dancer.

=== 1980–1999: Risas y salsa ===
Cabrera jumped to fame in the sketch called El jefecito, starring along with Antonio Salim in the Saturday comedy program Risas y salsa. She also participated in others, such as El Matrimonio, Amor imposible, and La guerra de los sexos.

She was married to Rodolfo Carrión, who played the secretary of El jefecito, for eight years.

=== Healthy living ===
After her divorce from Carrión, Cabrera had a 12-year marriage to television producer Luis Carrizales Stoll.

With the purpose of promoting healthy living and sports, she hosted the health program Pónte en forma con Analí and founded her own gym located in San Miguel District. She had sequences on the programs Buenos días, Perú on Panamericana Televisión and Para todos on Canal A.

=== Death ===
At approximately 5:35 am on 21 June 2011, her 52nd birthday, Cabrera died of breast cancer in the home of her partner's family, where she had lived for several years. After the news was made public, her followers, friends, several artists, and politicians declared their grief at her death, including the former President Alan García Pérez, who in dialogue with the press said, "We all know the profound significance this girlfriend will always have for all Peruvians. 'Chelita', a girlfriend that all Peruvians would have wanted to have." She was the partner of Havier Arboleda at the time of her death.

Her body was cremated, and then her ashes scattered on Naplo beach. Crowds of people came to the crematorium Jardines de la Paz to express many signs of affection for her family.

== Filmography ==
=== Television ===
- 1987: El jefecito as Graciela 'Chelita' Muchotrigo
- 1988–1989: Aeróbicos con Analí
- 1993–1994: Las mil y una de Carlos Álvarez
- 1997–1999: Risas y salsa, under the direction of Efraín Aguilar
- 1997: Adelgace bailando con Analí
- 2005: María de los Ángeles as Verónica

=== Film ===
- 2010: Rehenes
- 2011: La Huerta Perdida

== Theater ==
- 2008: Las viejas amistades
- 2009: Uno para las tres
- 2010: Sin cuenta de años
