= José Zamora (footballer, born 1987) =

Peruvian footballer (born 1987)

Personal information
- Full name: José Juan Zamora Gonzales
- Date of birth: January 24, 1987 (age 39)
- Place of birth: Lima, Peru
- Height: 1.77 m (5 ft 10 in)
- Position: Center back

Team information
- Current team: Alfredo Salinas

Senior career*
Years	Team	Apps	(Gls)
2008–2009	Colegio Nacional Iquitos	15	(1)
2010	Sporting Cristal	1	(0)
2011	Colegio Nacional Iquitos	19	(1)
2012	Los Caimanes	6	(0)
2012	Unión Comercio	1	(0)
2013	Colegio Nacional Iquitos		
2014	Pacífico	25	(0)
2015	San Simón	11	(0)
2016–	Alfredo Salinas	24	(0)
- * Club domestic league appearances and goals as of 20 November 2016

José Juan Zamora Gonzales (born January 24, 1987) is a Peruvian footballer who plays as a center back. He currently plays for Colegio Nacional de Iquitos.

== Club career ==
Zamora played the 2008 Copa Perú competition with Colegio Nacional de Iquitos and managed to help the club win promotion back to the Peruvian First Division that season. The following season, he stayed with the Iquitos based club. There Zamora made his Peruvian First Division debut in the 2009 Torneo Descentralizado in Round 3 at home to Sport Huancayo. He played the entire match and helped his side keep a clean sheet with a 2–0 win. Later that season Zamora scored his first goal in the First Division in Round 42 against Sporting Cristal. He scored in the 16th minute in the 3–1 home win at the Estadio Max Augustín.

On December 22, 2009, it was announced that Zamora would join Peruvian giants Sporting Cristal for the start of the 2010 Torneo Descentralizado season.
