= La otra orilla =

- Genre: Drama
- Created by: Michelle Alexander
- Written by: Rita Solf; Tito Céliz; Abel Enríquez
- Directed by: Sandro Méndez; Julián Alexander
- Starring: Carolina Infante; Gonzalo Molina; Alicia Mercado; Martín Velásquez; Irene Eyzaguirre; Laly Goyzueta
- Theme music composer: Juan Carlos Fernández
- Opening theme: "Mil abrazos" by Arianna Fernández
- Country of origin: Peru
- Original language: Spanish
- No. of seasons: 1
- No. of episodes: 40

Production
- Executive producers: Adrianna Álvarez; Ivanna de la Piedra
- Producers: Hugo Coya; Michelle Alexander
- Camera setup: Multi-camera
- Production company: Del Barrio Producciones

Original release
- Network: América Televisión
- Release: 3 August – 25 September 2020

La otra orilla is a Peruvian drama television series created by Michelle Alexander. It aired on América Televisión from 3 August 2020 to 25 September 2020. The series tells the story of several people working during the COVID-19 pandemic and how they strive daily to overcome adversity. It stars Carolina Infante, Gonzalo Molina, Alicia Mercado, Martín Velásquez, Irene Eyzaguirre and Laly Goyzueta.

== Premise ==
The series follows Gloria, an ICU nurse who lives with her husband, a teacher, and whose life has been changed by the COVID-19 pandemic as they are unable to be with their son. It also follows Sergio, a security guard for a television channel who falls in love with Patricia, a reporter from the media; and Magda, a street sweeper, goes in search of her daughter who has disappeared and only wants to see her again.

== Cast ==
- Carolina Infante as Gloria Gutiérrez Alcazar de Quiñones
- Gonzalo Molina as Pablo Quiñones
- Alicia Mercado as Patricia Quiñones Osorio
- Martín Velásquez as Sergio Salazar Pacheco
- Irene Eyzaguirre as Magda Chepén
- Laly Goyzueta as Lorena Osorio
- Francesca Vargas as Zoila Gutiérrez Alcazar
- Sol Nacarino as Ruth Castillo Chepén
- Juan Pablo Abad as Yastin Quiñones Gutiérrez
- Carlos Victoria as Humberto Gutiérrez
- Tula Rodríguez as Carmen Sotomayor
- Sylvia Majo as Abelarda
- Liliana Trujillo as Yolanda Pacheco de Salazar
- Óscar Carrillo as Martín Salazar
- Emilram Cossío as Román
- Joaquín de Orbegozo as Álvaro Astudillo
- Daniel Cano as Junior Ocaña Sifuentes / Morata
- Ismael Contreras as Apolonio
- Lissette Gutiérrez as Josefina Durand
- Yaremís Rebaza as Giordana
- Yaco Eskenazi as Gonzalo de la Cruz
- Pold Gastello as Angobaldo Di Angelo
- Fernando Bakovic as Dr. Rodrigo Mercado
- Renato Bonifaz as Eduardo Vivanco
- Alejandro Baca as Fermin
- Kiara Tangüis as Rosana

== Reception ==
The telenovela premiered on 3 August 2020 with a percentage rating of 18.6 points, becoming the most watched program in its timeslot.
