= Dos hermanas (TV series) =

- Genre: Telenovela
- Created by: Michelle Alexander
- Written by: Rita Solf; Abel Enríquez; Tito Céliz
- Directed by: Francisco Álvarez; Aldo Salvini; Sandro Méndez
- Starring: Melissa Paredes; Sebastián Monteghirfo
- Theme music composer: Juan Carlos Fernández
- Opening theme: "Te encontraré" by Erick Elera
- Country of origin: Peru
- Original language: Spanish
- No. of seasons: 1
- No. of episodes: 93

Production
- Camera setup: Multi-camera
- Production company: Del Barrio Producciones

Original release
- Network: América Televisión
- Release: 4 March 2020 – 12 July 2021

Dos hermanas is a Peruvian telenovela created by Michelle Alexander. It aired on América Televisión from 4 March 2020 to 12 July 2021. The telenovela stars Melissa Paredes and Sebastián Monteghirfo.

== Plot ==
In 1993, during the height of the terrorist attacks, Mery and Urpi are two sisters whose lives are changed when terrorists murder their parents, prompting them to flee to Lima. Once in the capital, they are placed in a shelter; however, the two sisters are separated; nothing is known of Urpi, while Mery escapes from the shelter and wanders the streets until she is adopted by Loyda Pérez, who invites her to live in her home with her children, Ramón and Betsy.

Many years later, Mery is married to Johnny, and has a daughter, Rosita. Against all odds, she sets out to find Urpi, who now goes by the name Fiorella, a professional who studied abroad and has returned to Lima to visit her adoptive family. Mery and Fiorella run into each other by chance on the street; however, since Fiorella doesn't remember anything, she resents Mery. Things change when Noelia, Fiorella's adoptive mother, is diagnosed with cancer, and she decides that Fiorella should take the reins of the Vitalia company, where none other than Mery and her adoptive sister, Betsy, are hired as assistants. Fiorella takes advantage of her new position to expresses her rejection of Mery, unaware of the truth. It will take a long time, and many obstacles, for the two sisters to reunite.

== Cast ==
- Melissa Paredes as María "Mery" Etelvina Vilca Pando de Ronceros
- Mayella Lloclla as Fiorella Berrospi Vargas
  - Naima Luna as child Fiorella
- Francesca Vargas as Urpi Rosa Vilca Pando / Professor Asunción Rosa Pando Malta de Vilca
- Sebastián Monteghirfo as Ramón Alfonso Aranibar Pérez
- Erick Elera as Johnny Ronceros Méndez
- David Villanueva as Guillermo de la Cruz Contreras
- Yaco Eskenazi as Gustavo Allemant Villanueva
- Marisol Aguirre as Noelia Vargas Ruiz de Berrospi
- Julián Legaspi as Fernando Berrospi Solari
- Pierina Carcelén as Ximena Berrospi Ballón
- Fiorella Luna as Martha Ruíz Sousa
- Silvia Bardalez as Loyda Pérez Choquehuanca de Araníbar
- Kiara Tanguis as Patricia "Patty" Alejandra Mendoza Adams
- Sandra Vergara as Betzabeth "Betsy" Araníbar Pérez de Chauca
- Marcello Rivera as Danilo Marlon Chauca Oquendo
- Brando Gallesi as Brayan Ronceros Méndez
- Alessia Lambruschini as Rosa "Rosita" Ronceros Vilca
  - Lambruschini also portrays Mery as a child
- Maríagracia Mora as Mayra Chauca Araníbar
- Mariano García-Rosell as Dante Cáceres Ramírez
- Karime Scander as Bianca Berrospi Vargas
- Zoé Fernández as Julia "Jully" Araníbar Ruíz
- Sandro Calderón as Pablo Pando Malta/Wilson
- Carolina Infante as Silvia Ramírez de Pando
- Alexandra Barandiarán as Gloria
- Natalia Montoya as Celeste Figueroa
- Fabián Calle as Fierrito
- Luciana León-Barandiarán as Alisson Ugarte
- Juan Carlos Pastor as Officer José Luis Joya Peña
- Pold Gastello as Carlomagno La Rosa
- Iván Chávez as Prosecutor Juan Sarmiento
- Emilram Cossío as Adrián Seminario
- Víctor Machengo Mendoza as Walter Castro
- Carlos Victoria as Mario González
- Alberick García as Anselmo Cáceres
- Tadeo Congrains as Peña
- Zoé Arévalo as Romina
- Alejandra Saba as Carla de la Puente
- Ismael Contreras as Jerónimo
- Elsa Olivero as Delia Choquehuanca
- Sylvia Majo as Professor Mercedes "Mechita"
- Alain Salinas as Professor Pedro Porfirio Vilca Pullido

== Release ==
Dos hermanas premiered on 4 March 2020. On 15 March, Del Barrio Producciones announced that filming of the telenovela was suspended due to the COVID-19 pandemic. Because of this, the telenovela paused its broadcast on 19 March, after airing only 11 episodes. The telenovela returned on 1 March 2021 with 2 recap episodes covering the 11 episodes previously broadcast. The new episodes began airing on 3 March.

== Reception ==
The telenovela premiered on 4 March 2020, positioning itself as the most-watched program during primetime with a percentage rating of 26 points. Its return episode on 1 March 2021 was the most-watched program in its timeslot with a percentage rating of 17 points.
