= List of La fea más bella characters =

It is a list of persons of Mexican telenovela La fea más bella.

== Characters ==
=== Main ===
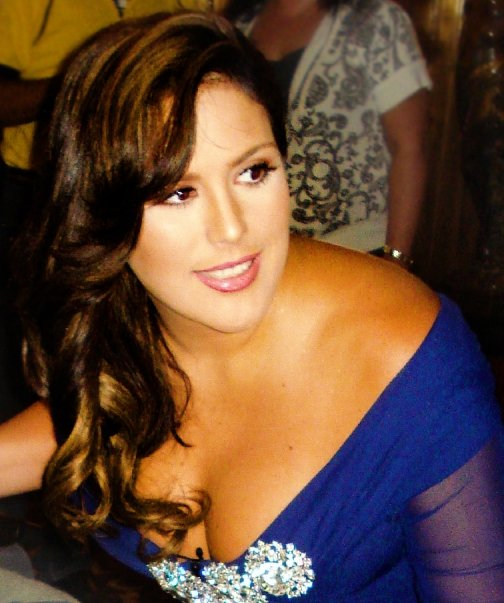
Angélica Vale is La fea más bella.

- Leticia "Lety" Padilla Solís de Mendiola/ Aurora Mayer De Salinas (Angélica Vale), She is an intelligent and charming but very ugly young woman. She seizes the chance to prove herself when she gets hired at Conceptos, one of Mexico's most prestigious media enterprises. She immediately falls in love with her boss, Fernando Mendiola despite the fact that he's already engaged to the jealously controlling Marcia. She is also hated by most of Conceptos staff who don't take her seriously and don't think she fits in. She helps her boss, (whom she calls "Don Fernando") fix his financial mistakes by tampering with the books after much hesitating and debating on the legalities of it. When Fernando hears that she has a love for her best friend Tomas (a false rumor from her friends) he is convinced by VP Omar to seduce her and pretending he is in love with her. Despite him being engaged, and having not only witnessed but help cover for his many infidelities, she accepts and further helps him. After she finds out she was just being used, she runs away to Acapulco where she meets Aldo and learns to open up her heart again. She ends up in a love triangle between the handsome, kind Aldo and the man she still has lingering feelings for, Fernando. She gets two makeovers during the course of the show; the first one transforms her into a classical seductress-type beauty ("Aurora") which makes her realize her potential but leaves her feeling uncomfortable and unsure of who she really is. The second makeover is at the very end which combines the simplicity and demureness of her old self with the classic beauty of the vampy "Aurora". Over time, Lety realizes her worth and her influence on others, which helps win over most of the Conceptos staff. Her wedding was also a dramatic, elaborate affair, taking place in the Cathedral of Monterrey and containing everyone from Conceptos, which is much of the cast. The broadcast of the wedding had the cast in a parade with thousands of fans crowding the streets to see Lety marry the man of her dreams.
- Fernando Mendiola Saénz (Jaime Camil), Son of Humberto Mendiola, he is elected as the new president of Conceptos when his fiancé, Marcia, votes for him. He's sarcastic and very much a playboy but he tries to work hard at the company, despite his inexperience. He's initially unhappy at having an ugly assistant but finds her intelligence to be an asset and keeps her around, even coming to her defense on occasion. He convinces his assistant, Lety, to help him doctor some books by taking advantage of her loyalty to him. Later on his is convinced to "date" her to keep her on his side, despite being engaged to Marcia. However, he slowly but surely falls in love with Lety but that's when she discovers he was just using her all along. She leaves and when she returns he finds it harder to convince her of his sincerity, especially when he discovers the new man in her life, Aldo. He jealously spies on Lety and Aldo when they start their burgeoning romance, enlisting his friend Omar to help. It takes him a while but he finally breaks up with Marcia, making it clear that he doesn't want her, and the only woman he really loves is Lety.
- Marcia Villarroel Drummond (Elizabeth Álvarez), Fernando's fiancée. She knows her fiance's reputation as a Casanova so she keeps Fernando under surveillance, or employs her friend Alicia to do so, whenever she can. She initially doesn't like Lety because she thinks Lety is helping Fernando carry on his affairs (which is actually partly true). She never thought Lety and Fernando would be carrying on an affair and when she found out she was devastated, adding a new reason as to why she hated Lety until nearly the end. Lety tries to regard her with respect, knowing that she was in the wrong dating her boss despite knowing he was engaged to Marcia. She and Fernando break up and after realizing he'll never love her back, she decides they really are better off friends. Eventually Marcia meets someone online and they begin dating; she also gets over her negative feelings towards Lety and even attends her lavish wedding.
- Alicia Ferreira de Mora (Patricia Navidad), Alicia Ferreira is everything that Lety is not: graceless and tactless but sexy and proud of it. She gets hired at Conceptos, not for her abilities or her resume like Lety, but as Marcia Villarroel's spy on Fernando. She's "The Ugly Club's" nemesis, they nickname her "la oxigenada" ("the Bleached Blonde"). She has serious monetary problems because she likes to buy herself lavish clothes and jewelry despite not having the salary for it. She often likes to brag that she studied "six semesters of finance at the Anahuac", as proof of her education and abilities. She ends up marrying Tomas, who she calls 'Tommy', after discovering how much money he makes at 'Conceptos'. Though she's shallow, vindictive, and spoiled, shades of her softer side start to appear towards the end of the series culminating in her returning the money she stole from 'Conceptos' after discovering Tomas was taking the blame for it. Alicia becomes pregnant with Tomas's child.
- Don Erasmo Padilla Galarza, (José José), Lety's father. He's extremely strict and still sees his daughter as a little girl who cannot look after herself. He values good morals above all else and he's terrified of big changes. He treats Tomas like a son, and the only boy who's allowed in Lety's room. He later helps out with Lety's company, "Filmo Imagen". After much prodding from his wife and daughter, he accepts that Lety is a beautiful, grown woman who can take care of herself. He suffers a heart attack and almost dies. He and Julieta renew their vows.
- Doña Julieta Solís de Padilla (Angélica María), Lety's mother. She is an excellent cook and a caring mother. Even when Lety does not want to tell her all that goes on in her life, she prays for her daughter's well-being and offers to lend an ear if she ever does want to talk. She treats Tomas like the son she's always wanted. feeding him whenever he stops by (which is often as he loves her cooking). She always supports her family and offers Lety and Tomas advice. Though she likes Aldo, she ends up being very supportive of Fernando and helps him win Lety back as she starts planning her wedding with Aldo.
- Luigi Lombardi (Sergio Mayer), homosexual fashion director. He's obsessed with beauty and glamor and will not stand anything less. He declares himself Lety's enemy because of those beliefs. He develops a huge crush on Aldo and for a while he and Alicia try to fight for Aldo's attentions (which Aldo doesn't seem to realize). The crush more or less stops when he discovers, along with everyone at Conceptos, that Aldo is in love with Lety. He later on becomes obsessed with the glamorous and mysterious Aurora (secretly Lety) and would go on to do a second makeover on her right near the end of the show (a makeover that is in the middle of the ugly and seductress extremes; leaving Lety with a lovely look befitting her). He does this for her as a thanks for her helping him reunite him with his ailing mother and formerly unaccepting father.

=== Recurring ===
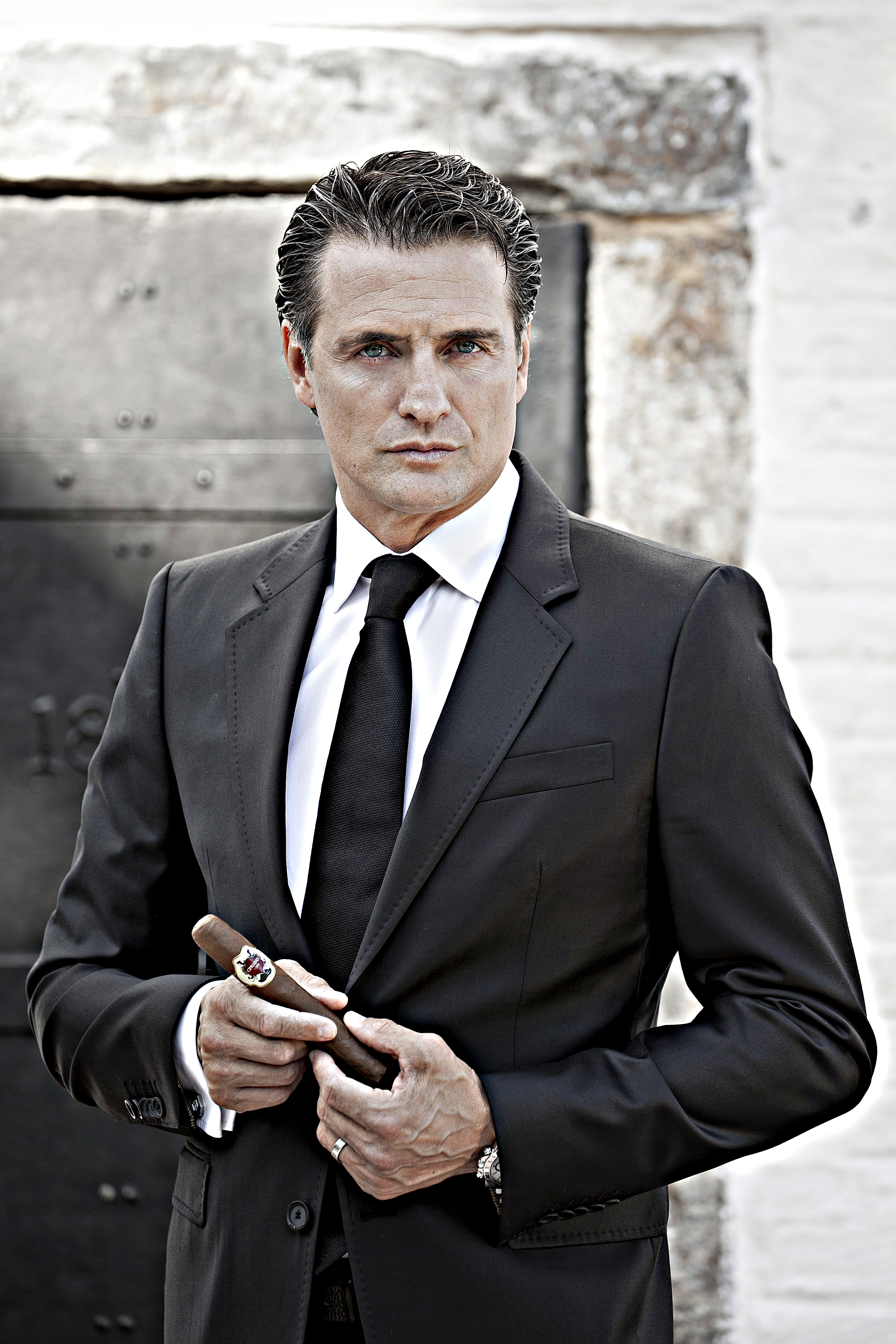
Juan Soler who plays Aldo

- Aldo Domenzaín (Juan Soler), A charming, handsome fisherman and chef with aspirations to own his own restaurant. He befriends Lety after saving her from drowning in the ocean He teaches her of the beauties of life and eventually falls in love with her much to the surprise of just about everyone, including Lety. He respects that she's still broken-hearted from her relationship with Fernando but he promises he'll win her heart, going so far as to follow her back to Conceptos and financially help the floundering company because he knows it's very important to Lety. Sometimes when Aldo has a heart to heart with Lety near water, a swan is seen swimming nearby. (a possible reference to the "ugly-duckling-to-swan"; the swan refers to Lety). He eventually gains ownership of Conceptos where he charms and befriends everyone there, except for Fernando. The two recognize each other as rivals for Lety's heart but try not to fight too openly for the sake of Lety. Tomas changes his appearance to look more like Aldo and try and win over Alicia. Aldo offers sympathies and advice and the two discover they share a mutual dislike for Fernando (because he broke Lety's heart) thus becoming good friends. In the end of the series, he is revealed to be a guardian angel who was sent to help and save Lety.

- Tomás Mora Gutiérrez (Luis Manuel Ávila), He is Lety's best (and initially only) friend. Being as ugly as Lety is, they relate to each other well and have always been like siblings, giving each other moral support. He is very intelligent, loyal, and caring but lacks common sense at times. He falls for the buxom but shallow Alicia Ferreira after he finds a picture of her in a magazine. Though she displays hostility towards him due to his appearance, he continues to try to win her over with gifts and money, which she gladly accepts. When he discovers Alicia has a huge crush on Aldo, he tries to change his hairstyle and clothing to match him (though the plan backfires on him when he doesn't pull the look off). He becomes good friends with Aldo and encourages him to pursue Lety, especially since it'll discourage Alicia's crush on Aldo. He eventually ends up marrying Alicia and getting her pregnant at the end of the show. He is somewhat of a show-off and fancies himself as the general manager of Filmo Imagen, the "dummy" company he and Lety created to help out Conceptos financially. He also tries to transform himself from an ugly duckling to a "Prince Charming" but doesn't do it nearly as dramatically as his best friend. Food and women, in that order, are his Achilles' heel.
- Carolina "Caro" Ángeles de Carvajal (Nora Salinas), formerly Conceptos ' public promoter. She seems to appear when Lety is going through personal conflicts and helps her out. She then becomes Lety's 2nd best friend. She's also friends with Aldo and offers a friendly ear when he wonders how to go about winning Lety's heart. She helps makeover Lety into a seductress type model they nickname "Aurora". She's the only contact 'Conceptos' has with the mysterious Aurora and she tries to cover for Lety/Aurora when she can. She starts falling for Omar despite helping Lety get back at him for helping Fernando toy with her heart. She tries to convince Lety/Aurora not to toy with Omar anymore after hearing of his pain and heartache from the man himself. In the end, she ends up sleeping with, and then starting a relationship with Omar, who has more or less learned the error of his womanizing ways.
- Omar Carvajal (Agustín Arana), He is Fernando's chauvinistic, womanizing best friend and accomplice. He is also Conceptos’ vice president. He believes firmly in bachelorhood and how to make the most of it. He usually supports Fernando's worst ideas and the advice he provides Fernando often turns out to be even worse than Fernando's own judgment. Omar believes that he is the ultimate Casanova and therefore he can woo any women he wants. In fact, he is the one who tells Fernando to seduce Lety in order to keep the company. He nicknames Lety "la gargolita" ("the little gargoyle"), which Fernando later comes to despise and angrily (with force) discourages. He meets his match in the mysterious woman, "Aurora" (secretly Lety) and falls head over heels for the stunning woman only to be rebuffed. He tries to woo the mysterious woman, confused but more determined every time she calls him on his playboy ways and leaves him planted. He seeks help from Carolina but eventually falls for her instead, thus ending his bachelor days.
- Ariel Villarroel Drummond (Raúl Magaña), Marcia's brother, Ariel is a greedy and selfish man only able to look after himself and his money. He wants to get the presidency of Conceptos no matter what. He's always sneaking behind Fernando's back, looking for flaws in his work. He gets the police on Tomas in the last episode, blaming him of a theft that was actually committed by Alicia, who then rushes to save him.
- Simón José "Simon Joseph" Contreras (Julio Mannino), He has a major crush on Paula María, although his job as the Conceptos messenger is not good enough for her standards. He is cute, sweet, fun, and always on the move. He eventually earns a diploma at Information Technology and wins over Paula Maria. They marry shortly afterwards. He and Celso keep close ties with the Ugly Club, but they aren't technically part of it because they are males, though sometimes others see them as part of the "Club" nevertheless.
- Don Humberto Mendiola (Carlos Bracho), Founder and first president of Conceptos, he is Fernando's proud father. He appreciates honesty and loyalty. He almost sues Lety when he discovered what she did to his company (with Fernando), but he's confronted by her dad, and they end up forming a compromise.
- Doña Teresa "Teresita" Saénz de Mendiola (Julissa), Fernando's mother likes to see her family together and is very fond of Marcia, siding with her against Lety, especially after the near bankruptcy of Conceptos (partly because of Lety and Fernando's book tampering) is discovered. Though she was distrustful of Lety at first, she ends up getting used to her.
- Celso Durán (Erick Guecha), He is Conceptos 's doorman. He is very humble and honest. He is usually accompanied by his bulldog, Sansón. Though he is the first person to be disgusted at Lety's original appearance on her first to "Conceptos", he ends up being one of her first work friends, besides Simon and "The Ugly Club". He often does other people's, especially Alicia's, bidding.
- Sara Patiño (Raquel Garza), Sara is Omar Carvajal's secretary. Her great height has impeded her from getting a good husband. Sara is very brave and will do anything to protect herself and the rest of "The Ugly Club". She ends up adopting a kid in the end.
- Irma "Irmita" Ramírez (Luz María Aguilar), She is the oldest member of "The Ugly Club" and Luigi Lombardi's right hand. As the least gossipy of the group, she is always there to advise her friends or to give her boss his Valerian drops when the "mimisky" (mee-mees-kee) hits him. Her husband, who abandoned her years ago, makes an unexpected visit shortly after Irmita faints of being overworked in the middle of the program, and dies several episodes later for not taking his prescribed medication.
- Efrén Rodríguez "El Cheque" (Carlos Bonavides ), Lola's irresponsible husband, whom she refers to as Señor Cheque (Mr. Check). He abandoned her and their children and he never has their monthly support payment on time. As he is not yet divorced from Lola, his relationship with his new sweetheart, Yazmín, can still be considered an affair.
- Jaimito Fuentes (Miguel Jiménez), Son of Paula María. He is a good kid who is always thinking of his mother. He also likes Simon, like a father, who has said that he wanted to become a messenger just like Simon. Jaimito had the opportunity to meet and live with his real father, instead he really wanted to be with Simon and found out so did his mother. Simon is happy to have him as a step-father when his mother marries.
- Juana Valdez (Gloria Izaguirre), Juana is the maid/janitor. She is the only member of "The Ugly Club" who does not complain about her love life. She is very good at anything esoteric, such as reading crystal balls or tarot cards. She predicts Lety's distant wedding in one of the earliest episodes of the program.
- Paula María Fuentes de Contreras (Niurka Marcos), Paula Maria is the receptionist and though she belongs to "The Ugly Club", she is quite pretty. However, because she wants the best for her and her son, Jaimito, she is very picky with the prospects she gets, always waiting for Prince Charming to come rescue her.
