= Days of Santiago =

2004 film

- Film poster
- Directed by: Josué Méndez
- Written by: Josué Méndez
- Starring: Pietro Sibille
- Release dates: 29 January 2004 (IFFR); 30 September 2004 (Peru)
- Running time: 83 minutes
- Country: Peru
- Language: Spanish

Days of Santiago (Spanish: Días de Santiago) is a 2004 Peruvian drama film written and directed by Josué Méndez. It was selected as the Peruvian entry for the Best Foreign Language Film at the 78th Academy Awards, but it was not nominated.

== Cast ==
- Pietro Sibille as Santiago Roman
- Milagros Vidal as Andrea
- Marisela Puicón as Elisa
- Ricardo Mejía as Papa
- Lili Urbina as Mama
- Alheli Castillo as Mari

== See also ==
- List of submissions to the 78th Academy Awards for Best Foreign Language Film
- List of Peruvian submissions for the Academy Award for Best International Feature Film
