= Lorenza (TV series) =

- Genre: Sitcom
- Created by: André Barren; Bárbara Torres
- Written by: Jurgan Jacobo; Víctor Acosta; Paula Aguilera; Eduardo Soto; Manolo Carmona
- Directed by: Juan Carlos de Llaca; Eduardo Soto
- Starring: Bárbara Torres; Moisés Arizmendi; Marcela Lecuona; Magda Karina; Violeta Isfel; Frank Medellín; Lander Errasti
- Country of origin: Mexico
- Original language: Spanish
- No. of seasons: 2
- No. of episodes: 25

Production
- Executive producer: André Barren
- Producer: Maricarmen Alpuche
- Editors: Luis Horacio Valdés; Andrés Riva; André Barren
- Production company: Televisa

Original release
- Network: Las Estrellas
- Release: 22 March 2019 – 1 December 2020

Lorenza, bebé a bordo, or simply Lorenza is a Mexican comedy television series created by André Barren and Bárbara Torres that aired on Las Estrellas from 22 March 2019 to 1 December 2020. The series stars Bárbara Torres as the titular character.

The series has been renewed for a second season, that premiered on 1 September 2020.

== Plot ==
Lorenza is a flight attendant of obsessive character, with an insistent dislike to men, caused by a love disappointment following an infidelity committed six years ago by Luis Enrique, her ex-boyfriend, with her twin sister Raymunda. In all this time, Lorenza has lost contact with Luis Enrique and Raymunda, despite the unsuccessful attempts of her ex-boyfriend and her sister, to look for her and ask her for forgiveness. Lorenza's life undergoes an unexpected turn, when she reunites with Raymunda, who, on the verge of dying, leaves her in charge of her one-year-old baby, Emiliano. Lorenza is looking for ways to cope with her new rhythm of life but everything gets complicated, so she decides to give him up for adoption to a children’s home, but she regrets before formalizing the process. However, Lorenza understands that she is not able to take care of the baby and in desperation asks for help to her nanny Chayo, who cared for her and her sister since they were little. Lorenza is given the task of searching for Emiliano's biological father with the help of his her friend Valentina and Chayo.

== Cast ==
=== Main ===
- Bárbara Torres as Lorenza Arteaga Vitte, a chief flight attendant and instructor of a low-cost airline called Aerosol. She is perfectionist, structured and likes to respect the rules however she turns chaotic and clumsy when she becomes the mother of her nephew Emiliano.
- Moisés Arizmendi as Luis Enrique Negroe Martínez, Lorenza's ex-boyfriend. He ended his relationship with Lorenza after he "mistakenly" cheated on her with her twin Raymunda. He is Lorenza's accomplice who will help her find Emiliano's father.
- Marcela Lecuona as Valentina Avendaño, Lorenza's best friend and confidant. She is also a flight attendant. She prefers unstable relationships and has never fallen in love, until she meets Luciano. Emiliano’s arrival to Lorenza's apartment causes her to rethink her way of life.
- Magda Karina as Juana Guadarrama, a social worker responsible for monitoring Emiliano’s file.
- Violeta Isfel as La Cuquis, a famous vlogger that gives tips to first-time moms. In front of the cameras is a charm, but outside of them, she is angry. She has seven children and has gotten married three times.
- Frank Medellín as Joaquín Rosado Del Monte, he works as a flight attendant in Aerosol with Lorenza and Valentina. He admires Lorenza for her professionalism. He is a good confidant and knows how to listen.
- Lander Errasti as Emiliano, Lorenza's 1 year old nephew, who already walks and speaks and at times drives Lorenza crazy. He already recognizes Lorenza as a mom.

=== Recurring ===
- María Prado as Rosario "Chayo" de la Cruz Gómez, she is an older woman, who was Lorenza and Raymunda’s nanny. She agrees to help take care of Emiliano temporarily.
- Oswaldo Zárate as Raúl Pedernal García, Luis Enrique’s best friend and accomplice. He has not had a stable relationship in years. He likes Valentina but she does not pay attention to him.
- Carlos López as Luciano Pérez Garris, he works in the street and looks for temporary jobs such as driving a taxi. He has a good heart and always seeks a solution to any adversity.

== Production ==
Production of the series began on 11 September 2018. Filming of the second season began on 8 June 2020.

== Episodes ==
=== Series overview ===
Series	Episodes	Originally released	
Series	Episodes	First released	Last released
1	13	22 March 2019	14 June 2019
2	12	1 September 2020	1 December 2020

=== Season 1 (2019) ===
No. overall	No. in season	Title	Original release date
1	1	"Bebé a bordo"	22 March 2019
Lorenza is a successful flight attendant, who suddenly changes her life after the death of her sister Raymunda, since she leaves her son Emiliano under her charge. But Lorenza does not know how to care of a baby. Guest star: Luis Gatica as Priest
2	2	"Mala mami"	29 March 2019
Lorenza is a victim of social media for having left Emiliano in the car. Juana, a social worker, seeks to take away the custody. In addition, she is reunited with Luis Enrique, her ex-boyfriend. Guest star: Alejandra Bogue as Ale
3	3	"Se busca nana"	5 April 2019
Lorenza and Valentina, end up in jail for driving with alcoholic breath, Luis Enrique pays their bail. Chayo, the nanny, is incompetent to care for Emiliano, so Lorenza decides to look for a new nanny.
4	4	"Buscando al papá"	12 April 2019
Lorenza, Valentina and Chayo search in Raymunda's office for clues to find Emiliano's father. Lorenza dresses like her sister and manages to fool Luis Enrique.
5	5	"El empacho"	19 April 2019
Emiliano suffers from indigestion and Lorenza takes him to the hospital, although Chayo applies a millennial remedy. Lorenza doesn't believe in the remedy so she takes Emiliano and Chayo on one of the flights and creates tremendous chaos.
6	6	"El negro del whats"	26 April 2019
Continuing the search for Emiliano's father, Lorenza disguises herself as Raymunda to obtain the DNA of Lalo Wow, a tantric sex professor and possible candidate to be Emiliano's father.
7	7	"¿A none está Emiliano?"	3 May 2019
Chayo cancels Lorenza to itake care of Emiliano, so she has to take him to a training session. When everything seems to be going well, Emiliano disappears and an entanglement is made in which Luis Enrique is involved.
8	8	"Patito, Patote"	10 May 2019
Valentina notices Lorenza too bitter because of lack of sex, so she gives her a sex toy, but she will be freed better with Patricio, possible father of Emiliano.
9	9	"Estimulación temprana"	17 May 2019
Lorenza and Luis Enrique take Emiliano to an early stimulation course taught by La Cuquis. Luis Enrique is popular among moms, Lorenza gets jealous and they argue, but they end up together in bed.
10	10	"Ce-los dije"	24 May 2019
Lorenza is feeling very bad for having slept with Luis Enrique and invites Lalo Wow on a date. Meanwhile, Juana Guadarrama prepares an unpleasant surprise to take custody of Emiliano.
11	11	"El ADN correcto"	31 May 2019
Lorenza seeks as never before the biological father of Emiliano to give him custody of Emiliano, this is how she meets Manuel and she is sure that the DNA test this time will be positive.
12	12	"La gran sorpresa"	7 June 2019
Lorenza is so happy that everything is going well that she reconciles with Luis Enrique. The trial is held for the custody of Emiliano, Juana does another DNA test.
13	13	"La huida"	14 June 2019
Lorenza is not willing to lose Emiliano, so she first hides from Juana and then decides to leave with him for good.

=== Season 2 (2020) ===
No. overall	No. in season	Title	Original release date
14	1	"El Regreso"	1 September 2020 (Note: Premiered early online through Las Estrellas website on 28 August 2020.)
In order to continue with Emiliano, Lorenza takes refuge in the Chiapas jungle, until Luis Enrique decides to go look for her because Chayo has gotten sick.
15	2	"Los celos"	8 September 2020
At Lorenza's welcome party, Luis Enrique introduces her to Mariana, the new chef of Buen Diente, who everyone loves, which will make Lorenza jealous.
16	3	"La otra jefa"	22 September 2020
After her return to Aerosol, Lorenza confronts the person who took her place, the new chief flight attendant: Romina Guzmán, a woman who hates her for a misunderstanding with her sister Raymunda.
17	4	"Mamá tóxica"	29 September 2020
Lorenza decides to put Emiliano in a course taught by Cuquis, the famous blogger, but discovers that she does not want to be separated from the little boy and provokes an argument with Luis Enrique.
18	5	"La suegra llegó"	6 October 2020
The unexpected visit of Sarita, Luis Enrique's mother, from Monterrey, causes a misunderstanding, so he will have to get rid of this predicament that involves the whole family.
19	6	"La prueba de embarazo"	13 October 2020
Lorenza considers Luciano a very bad match for her friend, so she proposes that she show him a pregnancy test with a false positive to see his reaction. Things will turn out as nobody expects.
20	7	"El oso de Emiliano"	20 October 2020
The toy bear that Emiliano has asked for so much as a birthday present is stolen during one of Lorenza's flights, so she decides to get another one, taking desperate measures and regardless of consequences.
21	8	"La Pelea"	27 October 2020
A joke towards Lorenza that Valentina initiates provokes a dispute between friends that antagonizes them. Chayo proposes an infallible plan for them to regain the complicity and friendship they had.
22	9	"El Colegio"	10 November 2020
After the bad influence that Lorenza considers everyone gives to Emiliano, she decides to put him in an excellent school, however one of the greatest tests is that he stops using a diaper.
23	10	"Me siento vieja"	17 November 2020
One morning, Lorenza discovers that she has her first gray hair, which causes her hysteria. She imagines what she and her family will be like when they grow up, so she decides to take extreme measures.
24	11	"Raymunda regresa"	24 November 2020
Lorenza dreams of her late sister Raymunda and decides to hire a medium to speak with her. This spirals out of control when Raymunda takes possession of Lorenza's body and causes family chaos.
25	12	"El ADN y el bautizo"	1 December 2020
Luis Enrique organizes Emiliano's baptism, Lorenza receives the news about the true biological father of the child, so she will have to make a decision, whether to reveal him or to follow her life.

== Awards and nominations ==
Year	Award	Category	Nominated	Result
2020	TVyNovelas Awards	Best Actress in a Comedy Series	Bárbara Torres	Nominated
