= Marisela Puicón =

Peruvian actress, singer and model (born 1981)

- Born: 1981 (age 44–45); Lima, Peru
- Occupations: Songwriter, Singer, actress
- Years active: 2000–present

Marisela Puicón is a Peruvian actress, singer and model who entered the industry in 2000 in commercials and later moved into television and theater. She found work with her band "Marisela Puicón y Los Latinos".

== Background ==
Marisela began her career in 2000 in the world of modeling. Her acting career began by playing a series of characters on Peruvian Telenovelas, miniseries and movies, including Pantaleon y Las Visitoras and Dias de Santiago.

In 1999 she began a new singing project, recording two albums Cumbia Mia and Fuciones Musicales. Marisela for most of her career has demonstrated her musical creativity like her acting, as one of the best products of the Peruvian media.

== Movies ==
- Yuli (2018)
- La sacamos del estadio (2018)
- Ciudad de los Reyes (2007)
- Pasajeros (2007)
- Dias de Santiago (2004)
- Pantaleon y las visitadoras (2000)

== Television ==
- La gran sangre III 2006
- Virgenes de la cumbia II 2006
- Camino a Casa 2006
- Virgenes de la Cumbia I 2006

== Music ==
- Escucha (2006)
- Cumbia Mia (2010)
- Proyecto Mariposa (2014–2015)
