= Avenida Perú =

- Created by: Original story: Gonzalo Rodriguez Risco; Michel Gómez; Adaptation and Screenplay for Andina de Televisión: Alfredo Ortiz de Zevallos; Nena Bravo; Pamela Limo; Marcela Hinostroza
- Directed by: Guillermo Isla
- Starring: Gerardo Zamora; Nidia Bermejo; Gabriela Gastelumendi; Jesús Neyra; Tula Rodríguez; Lorena Caravedo
- Opening theme: Avenida Perú
- Country of origin: Peru
- Original language: Spanish
- No. of episodes: 120

Production
- Executive producers: Guillermo Valenzuela; Benito Escobar; Florencia Martínez
- Producer: Michel Gómez
- Production locations: Lima, Peru
- Running time: 45 minutes
- Production companies: ATV; TL Producciones

Original release
- Network: ATV
- Release: May 20 – November 5, 2013

Avenida Perú (English: Peru Avenue) is a 2013 Peruvian telenovela produced by Michel Gómez and broadcast by ATV. It stars Gerardo Zamora, Nidia Bermejo and Gabriela Gastelumendi, with the participation of Jesús Neyra, Lorena Caravedo, Carlos Cano de la Fuente and Tula Rodríguez.

== Cast ==
- Gerardo Zamora as Hildebrando Huamán Rojas.
- Nidia Bermejo as María Fe Flores Donayre.
- Gabriela Gastelumendi as María Alejandra Monteverde Parodi.
- Jesús Neyra as Sebastián Neuhaus Cisneros / Mateo.
- Carlos Cano de la Fuente as Rogelio Concha y Maña.
- Javier Valdés as Felipe Monteverde Terry.
- Lorena Caravedo as Carmen León.
- Alexandra Graña as Andrea Stigler Velarde.
- Francisco Cabrera como Ulises Huarcayo Alva.
- Tula Rodríguez as Yessenia Amasifuén.
- Dante del Águila as Juan José Amasifuén.
- Carolina Cano as Monique Aguirre Córdova.
- Daniel Neuman as Jerson Mesías Luna.
- Milagros López Arias as Wendy Rosas Gamarra.
- Carlos Mesta as Jerónimo Flores Espinoza.
- Mónica Madueño as Maisa Parodi.
- Anaí Padilla Vásquez as Carola Ocaña Vargas.
- Claudio Calmet as Thiago Pereira Isasi.
- Sebastian Monteghirfo as Alfredo.
- Carlos Thorton as Gino.
- Jaime Phillips Calle as Warren Yáñez Zevallos.
- Miguel Ángel Álvarez as Ángel Rey.
- José Luis Ruiz as Fernando Rodriguez.
- Martín Velázquez as Darío.
- Sergio García-Blásquez as Brandon Solano Pérez.
- Daniela Camaiora as Valeria Calmet.
- Nicolás Fantinato as Benito Gálvez Rosado.
- Mónica Rossi as Rebeca Del Busto Alzalde.
- Javier Dulzaides as Lucas Flores Donayre.
- Oriana Cicconi as Dorita Sánchez.
- Macla Yamada as Lucía Del Busto.
- Natalia Montoya as Leticia Donayre Ortiz.
- Desirée Franco como Rubí Mesías Luna.
- Alonso Cano as Rubén.
- Carlos Lozano as Santiago.

=== Special participations ===
- Renzo Schuller as himself
- Gian Piero Díaz as himself.
