= Marisol Aguirre =

Peruvian actress, TV host, and model

- Occupations: Actress; television host; model
- Known for: starring in the telenovela "Gorrión."

Marisol Aguirre is a Peruvian actress, television host, and model. Currently resides in Peru. She is best known for starring in the telenovela "Gorrión" and hosting the TV show "Locademia de TV".

== Artistic career ==
Marisol made her television debut in 1992, when she hosted, with actor Sergio Galliani, the TV program "Locademia de TV" on the Peruvian state channel, which was a big TV hit that reached high ratings and, according to her own statements, planned the return of a successful project in the 1990s.

In 1994, she starred in the telenovela "Gorrión", where she met the actor Christian Meier, whom she married the following year.

After several years of absence, she would return briefly to TV in the telenovela "La noche" and then in 2002 with "Que buena raza", then it would continue until the date by telenovelas. She has acted in plays, mainly for children, and is dedicated to modeling as the official face of some cosmetic brands in Peru.

She reappeared on television in 2008 in the TV series "Esta sociedad 2". In 2009, she returned to host "El otro show", which was about the things that happen backstage and during rehearsals of "El Show de los sueños (Peru)".

In 2011, she appeared in the telenovela "Yo No Me Llamo Natacha" and then competed in "El Gran Show".

In 2013 she was in the American mini-series Greek Vacation.

== Television ==
- 2025: "Luz de luna"
- 2020: Dos hermanas
- 2011: "El Gran Show 2011 (season 2)" (5th Place)
- 2008: "Los Reyes de la Pista (Perú)" (2nd Place)
- 2008: "Bailando por un sueño (Perú)" (5th Place)

== Film ==
- 2018: "No Me Digas Solterona" María García
