= La familia P. Luche =

Mexican television sitcom (2002–2012)

- Also known as: The Plush Family
- Genre: Sitcom
- Created by: Eugenio Derbez; Jessica Cabrera; Marco Lagarde; Ricardo Álvarez
- Developed by: Pepe Sierra; Gus Rodríguez
- Written by: David Hernández; Pepe Sierra; Fran Hevia; Juan Carlos Garzón; Larissa Andrade; Enrique “Pointer” Gonzáles; Jesús Perrusquía; Alejandro Güemes; Marco Lagarde; Jessica Cabrera
- Directed by: Eugenio Derbez; David Hernández
- Starring: Eugenio Derbez; Consuelo Duval; Luis Manuel Ávila; Regina Blandón; Miguel Pérez; Bárbara Torres; Brayan Gibrán Mateo
- Theme music composer: Aleks Syntek
- Opening theme: "La familia P. Luche" by Aleks Syntek feat. Eugenio Derbez
- Country of origin: Mexico
- Original language: Spanish
- No. of seasons: 3
- No. of episodes: 80 (list of episodes)

Production
- Executive producer: Eugenio Derbez
- Producer: Elías Solorio Lara
- Running time: 30 minutes with commercials
- Production company: Televisa

Original release
- Network: Las Estrellas
- Release: 7 August 2002 – 16 September 2012

Related
- Derbez en cuando; XHDRbZ

La familia P. Luche ('The P. Lush Family') is a Mexican television sitcom created by Eugenio Derbez. The series aired from 7 August 2002 to 16 September 2012, on the Canal de las Estrellas. It is a spin-off of a recurring sketch from the comedy show XHDRbZ by Derbez and the network.

In the series, the characters live in a fictional city called "Ciudad P. Luche" where clothes and other objects are wrapped in plush. The word P. Luche, is a pun to the word plush in Spanish: peluche. The show is similar in style to the American sitcom Married... with Children, in that it depicts a comically dysfunctional family. La familia P. Luche, however, plays more like a live-action cartoon, complete with colorful sets and comic sound effects. The sitcom won a TVyNovelas Award for "Best Comedy Program" in 2008.

== Cast and characters ==
=== Main ===
- Ludovico P. Luche (Eugenio Derbez) is the father and leader of La Familia P.Luche. He is known for his laziness and low intelligence. He often shows that he is not happy with his life including his wife and kids; he is a terrible father and employee. He always wears blue clothes—mostly suits and ties—made of plush, and is a fan of Cruz Azul and Lorena Herrera.
- Federica Dávalos de P. Luche (Consuelo Duval) is the mother of La Familia P.Luche. She is known for being aggressive and over-dramatic with her kids and husband. She is very promiscuous, frequently flirting with other men, and is described as golosa (literally "greedy"). It is revealed in some episodes that she cheated on her husband twice: the first time with the butcher, and the second time with the milkman. She always wears pink clothes made of plush, mostly very provocative tops and skirts. She is a fan of Club América.
- Junior P. Luche (Luis Manuel Ávila) is actually a policeman whom Federica ran over with her car; when he awoke with amnesia, they managed to keep Federica out of jail by convincing him that he was one of their kids. They went on to treat him like a 12-year-old until he developed a childish personality and they decided to adopt him. Although he is nearly middle-aged and has a beard, everybody treats him like a child; he even goes to school. He always wears orange and yellow clothes made of plush and is a fan of Cruz Azul.
- Bibi P. Luche Dávalos (Regina Blandón) is considered "la rara" (the weird one) of the family. Bibi is the child of Federica and the butcher. Bibi is polite and correct, and has developed a great knowledge from studying, to her parents' despair as they beg her to act "normal." She is very smart and gets good grades; she loves her family but dislikes that they object to her studiousness. She is the only one in the family with common sense, with exception of Maradonio. She is also the most understanding, but her family thinks otherwise, but as it turns out it is not just her family who object her common sense, it is everyone. She always rolls her eyes when they deliver their phrase "Bibi, ¿por qué no eres una niña normal?" ("Bibi, why aren't you a normal girl?") She always wears purple clothes, but is the only character whose clothing is not made of plush. She also hates association with football, something the rest of the family fight over during games.
- Ludoviquito P. Luche Dávalos (Miguel Pérez) is the youngest child of the family and Federica's second son. The real Ludoviquito, however, is actually not seen after the first episode, in which he hypnotizes a rich boy at summer camp into believing that he is Ludoviquito. The show never reveals this boy's real name or who his real parents are; he identifies himself as the real Ludoviquito and believes Los P.Luche are his real family. He is a troublemaker, known for pulling pranks and stealing. He always wears green clothes made of plush, including tiny hats, and is a fan of Cruz Azul.
- Exelsa (Bárbara Torres) is the family's maid, although she is known for being lazy and hating to work, preferring to sleep or watch TV; Federica does the housework and even waits on her because she does not want her to leave. When asked to clean the house, she responds with "Yo solo soy la sirvienta" ("I'm just the maid"). She is from Argentina. She always wears a turquoise and white maid uniform made from plush. She is a fan of Boca Juniors.
- Maradonio P. Luche (Brayan Gibrán Mateo) is Ludovico's illegitimate son, (often referred to as such by Federica) mothered by Exelsa, who unknowingly impregnated herself with the sample Ludovico sold to pay for Bibi's "first period" party. Maradonio is a very precocious toddler who often points out the mistakes in Ludovico's logic; he is an expert gambler and is able to recite long poems without missing a beat. The family always carries him around carelessly. He always wears yellow and lime green clothes made of plush.

=== Recurring characters ===
- Martina de Galax (Dalilah Polanco) is the P. Luches' next-door neighbor, Flavio's wife and Federica's best friend.
- Flavio Galax (Pierre Angelo) is the P. Luches' next-door neighbor, Martina's husband and Ludovico's best friend.
- Chela (Silvia Eugenia Derbez) is the somewhat nosy and bitter apartment manager. "Chela" is both a nickname for "Graciela" and slang for beer, and Chela's surnames are based on Mexican brands. Silvia Eugenia Derbez is also Eugenio Derbez's real-life sister.
- Cristy (Catalina López) is the P. Luches' blind neighbor and Rigo's wife.
- Rigo (Pablo Valentín) is the P. Luches' blind neighbor and Cristy's husband.
- Lucrecia Dávalos-Malagón (Mercedes Vaughan) is Federica's sister and Don Camerino's girlfriend.
- Don Camerino (Juan Verduzco) is Ludovico's employer and Lucrecia's boyfriend. He owns half of P.Luche City, which everybody always says after his name in question form ("Don Camerino, owner of half of P.Luche City?").
- Abuela Francisca de Dávalos (Nora Velázquez) Lauro's wife and Federica and Lucrecia's mother.
- Abuelo Lauro Dávalos (Sergio Ramos) Francisca's husband and Federica and Lucrecia's father.
- "Gober" is the P. Luches' family dog.

== Episodes ==
=== Series overview ===
Series	Episodes	Originally released	
Series	Episodes	First released	Last released
1	38	7 August 2002	8 March 2004
2	24	19 March 2007	28 August 2007
3	18	8 July 2012	16 September 2012

=== Season 1 (2002–2004) ===
No. overall	No. in season	Title	Original release date
1	1	"Recuerdos"	7 August 2002
2	2	"La sirventa"	14 August 2002
3	3	"El cumpleaños de Ludoviquito"	21 August 2002
4	4	"Las cenizas"	28 August 2002
5	5	"La bomba"	4 September 2002
6	6	"Una novia para Don Camerino"	11 September 2002
7	7	"Ludovico en la escuela"	25 September 2002
8	8	"El primo de oro"	9 October 2002
9	9	"Brad Pittin"	16 October 2002
10	10	"Manifestación gay"	22 October 2002
11	11	"La mascota"	23 October 2002
12	12	"El concurso de reclamos"	20 November 2002
13	13	"Seminario de celosas"	4 December 2002
14	14	"El video de las cochinadas"	11 December 2002
15	15	"Regalo de aniversario"	18 December 2002
16	16	"Especial navideño de bloopers"	24 December 2002
17	17	"Federica desaparece"	22 January 2003
18	18	"Comandante Aligheri"	12 February 2003
19	19	"El Novio de Bibi"	19 February 2003
20	20	"El reto"	5 March 2003
21	21	"Viaje a Cancún"	2 April 2003
22	22	"Comentarista"	30 April 2003
23	23	"Regalos de navidad"	14 May 2003
24	24	"El embarazo de Federica"	28 May 2003
25	25	"Bibi es normal"	9 July 2003
26	26	"No estamos casados"	23 July 2003
27	27	"Un día de vida"	6 August 2003
28	28	"El ex"	3 September 2003
29	29	"La novia de Ludoviquito"	10 September 2003
30	30	"Consejos de matrimonio"	17 September 2003
31	31	"El represetante de Ludoviquito"	1 October 2003
32	32	"Vigilante"	15 October 2003
33	33	"Buenos Padres"	5 November 2003
34	34	"Reality show"	3 December 2003
35	35	"Primer periodo feliz de Bibi"	17 December 2003
36	36	"Recompensa"	14 January 2004
37	37	"La tele"	28 January 2004
38	38	"Nos vamos de viaje"	8 March 2004

=== Season 2 (2007) ===
No. overall	No. in season	Title	Original release date
39	1	"Perdidos"	19 March 2007
40	2	"Hogar, dulce hogar"	26 March 2007
41	3	"Amigos por conveniencia"	2 April 2007
42	4	"De regreso al trabajo"	9 April 2007
43	5	"Haciéndole al muertito"	16 April 2007
44	6	"Regalo de aniversario"	23 April 2007
45	7	"Lucha de empleos"	30 April 2007
46	8	"Cita a ciegas"	7 May 2007
47	9	"Gran confusión"	14 May 2007
48	10	"Carrera de perros"	21 May 2007
49	11	"Regresen a mis hijos"	28 May 2007
50	12	"Vamos al cine"	4 June 2007
51	13	"Pequeños ladrones"	11 June 2007
52	14	"Reunión escolar"	18 June 2007
53	15	"Secretos de un secuestro"	25 June 2007
54	16	"Los padres de Excelsa"	2 July 2007
55	17	"Cartuchos de esposos"	9 July 2007
56	18	"Identidad falsa"	16 July 2007
57	19	"El novio de Bibi"	23 July 2007
58	20	"Día de campo"	30 July 2007
59	21	"Quinceañera"	7 August 2007
60	22	"Niños de oro"	14 August 2007
61	23	"Sueño de telenovela"	21 August 2007
62	24	"Se busca un padre"	28 August 2007

=== Season 3 (2012) ===
No. overall	No. in season	Title	Original release date
63	1	"Hasta en la más mejores familias"	8 July 2012
64	2	"Viva el domingo"	15 July 2012
65	3	"Qué partida de dominó"	22 July 2012
66	4	"Federica enferma"	22 July 2012
67	5	"El atraco"	29 July 2012
68	6	"El súper episodio del súper"	29 July 2012
69	7	"Juego de roles"	5 August 2012
70	8	"Valle del Nabo"	5 August 2012
71	9	"Día de las madres"	12 August 2012
72	10	"Reparaciones"	12 August 2012
73	11	"El cumpleaños atrasado de Ludovico"	19 August 2012
74	12	"Bibi maneja"	19 August 2012
75	13	"El funeral de Merengues"	26 August 2012
76	14	"Federica ardiente"	26 August 2012
77	15	"La boda de Régulo"	2 September 2012
78	16	"El loco corte de pelo"	9 September 2012
79	17	"El genio bursátil"	9 September 2012
80	18	"La Navidad perfecta"	16 September 2012

== Production ==
=== Background ===
The series first started as a short skit in Derbez's previous shows, "Al Derecho y al Derbez" and "Derbez en Cuando" showing Ludovico, Federica, and an Asian kid starring as Ludoviquito, but when it aired it showed the change of Ludoviquito's actors and the other two kids. The explanation behind the change in actors for Ludoviquito was that he was not really Ludovico's son, but rather the product of a tryst between Federica and the milkman. While at summer camp, Ludoviquito manages to hypnotize the richest kid in camp to switch places with him. Ludovico and Federica don't even notice the difference, and not even the fact that he continually repeats "Yo soy Ludoviquito P.Luche (I am Ludoviquito P.Luche)" like a zombie makes them curious. Ludovico accidentally snaps Ludoviquito out of his trance, and the poor child begins to cry once he realizes the fate in which he is stuck.

=== Seasons 1–2 ===
The first season aired from 2002 to 2004 with frequent reruns of the episodes. The season finale stated that soon the second season would be produced (with the actors leaving a "goodbye" message like in the promotional commercial). The second season marked the show return at the end of the first quarter of 2007 (continuing with the plot that had ended the first season years ago, in which a plane where they were traveling crashing in an island and the family having passed around 5 years living there, to compensate the years that had passed after the first season), with the show now produced in a 16:9 (HDTV format) and airing constantly new episodes, using the same actors as in the first season (including the fact that the kids starring on it had grown up a lot).

=== Season 3 ===
A third season was announced to be in production in December 2010. Eugenio Derbez, the producer of the series, admitted that the new season will introduce a new character to the sitcom.

The season began on 8 July 2012, and ended on 16 September of the same year.

== Setting ==
- The sitcom is centered on a plush-wearing family who lives in a city called "Ciudad P. Luche" (P. Luche City). However, in the "Perdidos" episode, when the family lived mistakenly in Cancún for five years, Cancún's residents did not wear plush. So it can be assumed that only in Ciudad P. Luche people wear and use plush-related objects.
- The P. Luche apartment is the setting most of the time. It is an apartment in a tall building where its exterior appears in an animation piece. Inside, the sofa and rug are made of plush, and the home's walls are covered in brightly colored wallpaper.

== Awards ==
Year	Ceremony	Award	Result
2004	TVyNovelas Award	"Best Comedy Program"	Won
2008	TVyNovelas Award	"Best Comedy Program"	Won
