= Yuli (2018 film) =

- Film poster
- Directed by: Christian Carrasco
- Written by: Christian Carrasco
- Produced by: Karina Isla
- Starring: Marisela Puicón; Julián Legaspi
- Cinematography: Marco Alvarado
- Edited by: Gustavo Draghi
- Music by: Joaquín Rajadel
- Production companies: IntiKC Films; Madriguera Films
- Release date: October 11, 2018
- Running time: 100 minutes
- Country: Peru
- Language: Spanish

Yuli is a 2018 Peruvian science fiction action film written and directed by Christian Carrasco in his directorial debut. It stars Marisela Puicón and Julián Legaspi. It premiered on October 11, 2018, in Peruvian theaters.

== Synopsis ==
Yuli desperately observes on her bed the corpse that hours before had been her client, not knowing that under it is hidden a suitcase full of dollars that would be the salvation of her only daughter, victim of a serious illness. Hours go by and mafia hitmen already know their location and go after the loot. Sony, Yuli's unconditional friend, responds to her call, unaware of the dangers that await her... Yuli knows that only a great power can free her from death. Now it's just a matter of who will get there first.

== Cast ==
The actors participating in this film are:

- Marisela Puicón as Yuli
- Julián Legaspi as Cyborg
- Giovanna Valcárcel as Sony
- Jorge ‘Coco’ Gutiérrez
- Alexander Geks
- Aaron Alejandro Silverstone
- Alan Castillo
- Gustavo Cerrón
- Fernanda Pacheco
- Daniel Ceron
- Luis Rodríguez

== Production ==
Filming took place on locations in Lima and the Villa swamps in the summer of 2017. Post-production was done in Argentina and Indonesia.

== Reception ==
Yuli attracted 5,836 viewers throughout its run in Peruvian theaters.

== Future ==
Before the film's premiere, Christian Carrasco revealed that he was planning 2 sequels, with the script for both parts complete.
