= Los otros Concha =

- Genre: Telenovela
- Created by: Rita Solf
- Written by: Rita Solf; Bruno Alvarado; Tito Céliz; Cristian Lévano
- Directed by: Michelle Alexander; Francisco Álvarez; Aldo Salvini; Ani Alva Helfer; Sandro Méndez; Julián Alexander
- Creative director: Francisco Álvarez
- Starring: Tula Rodríguez; Paul Martin; Milene Vázquez; Andrés Vílchez; Sebastián Barreto; Raysa Ortiz; Sirena Ortiz; Amil Mikati; Miguel Dávalos; Fernando Niño; Miguel Álvarez; Gabriela Billotti; Fiorella Luna
- Music by: Juan Carlos Fernández
- Opening theme: "La comparsa" by Afrodisíaco
- Country of origin: Peru
- Original language: Spanish
- No. of seasons: 2
- No. of episodes: 161

Production
- Executive producer: Ivanna de la Piedra
- Producers: Hugo Coya; Adriana Álvarez; Michelle Alexander
- Cinematography: Warren Lévano
- Camera setup: Multi-camera
- Production company: Del Barrio Producciones

Original release
- Network: América Televisión
- Release: 13 March 2024 – 16 March 2026

Los otros Concha is a Peruvian telenovela created by Rita Solf for América Televisión, that premiered on 13 March 2024. It stars Tula Rodríguez, Paul Martin, Milene Vázquez, Andrés Vílchez, Sebastián Barreto, Raysa Ortiz, Sirena Ortiz, Amil Mikati, Miguel Dávalos, Fernando Niño, Miguel Álvarez, Gabriela Billotti and Fiorella Luna.

In August 2024, the series was renewed for a second season, which premiered on 17 December 2025. The final episode aired on 16 March 2026.

== Premise ==
The story centers on Emilio Concha Ritz, a congressman in Peru under investigation for illicit enrichment, who fakes his death to escape charges. Emilio is married Catalina Wissef, with whom he has two children: Josephine and Maximiliano. Emilio also has another family, consisting of Estela Vargas and their children: Walter, Jesusa and Pochito, and her godson, Güido. When both families learn of Emilio's supposed death, they attend his funeral and at that moment they meet their father's other family, revealing countless truths and entanglements.

== Cast ==
- Tula Rodríguez as Estela Ana Lucía Vargas Cóndor (seasons 1-2)
- Paul Martin as Emilio Enrique Concha Ritz / Emilio Enrique Soto (seasons 1-2)
- Milene Vázquez as Catalina Dessire Wissef Horna / Catalina Dessire Wissef Sanguinetti (seasons 1-2)
- Raysa Ortiz as Jesusa Lorena Concha Vargas / Jesusa Lorena Soto Vargas (seasons 1-2)
- Andrés Vílchez as Walter Enrique Concha Vargas / Walter Enrique Soto Vargas / Walter Enrique Concha Burns (seasons 1-2)
- Miguel Dávalos as Güido Collao Muñoz (seasons 1-2)
- Sirena Ortiz as Josefa Dominga Concha Vargas / Josephine Dominique Concha Wissef (seasons 1-2)
- Sebastián Barreto as Alfonso Alexander "Pochito" Concha Vargas / Alfonso Alexander "Pochito" Soto Vargas (seasons 1-2)
- Gabriela Billotti as Leticia Horna de Conde/ Leticia Sanguinetti Grados de Wissef (season 1)
- Miguel Álvarez as Leopoldo Ramírez Bazán (seasons 1-2)
- Carlos Victoria as Don Felipe Conde (season 1)
- Julián Legaspi as Julio "Julito" Ramírez Bazán (season 1)
- Fiorella Luna as Susana "Susanita" Conde Horna (season 1)
- Carla Arriola as Roberta Machuca (season 1)
- Stefano Meier as Bernard Watts de Osma (season 1)
- Fernando Niño as Profesor Amador Sarmiento (seasons 1-2)
- Elisa Costa as Eferling Conde Cáceres (season 1)
- Amil Mikati as Maximiliano Alejandro "Max" Concha Albert / Maximiliano Alejandro "Max" Concha Wissef (season 1)
- Mariano Ramírez as Chicho (seasons 1-2)
- Macarena Argote as Patricia Graciela "Patty" Ramírez Machuca (season 1)
- Valentina Saba as Stefánia Romel Dubois (season 2)
- Rodrigo Sánchez Patiño as Royal Romel Dubois (season 2)
- Denisse Dibós as Victoria Dubois (season 2)
- Sergio Armasgo as Ricardo "Ricky" Romel Dubois (season 2)
- José Luis Ruiz as Celso Malca (season 2)
- Marisa Minetti as Jacqueline "Jacquie" Ponce Villalva (season 2)
- Melissa Paredes as Nataly Leoneli Vargas (season 2)
- Julieta Alarcón as Eduarda "Lalita" (season 2)
- Silvana Goycochea as Tomasa "Tomasita" (season 2)
- Nicolás Osorio as Carlos Johnson Castro (season 2)

== Reception ==
The first season premiered on 13 March 2026, positioning itself as the most-watched program during primetime with a percentage rating of 20 points. The second season premiered on 17 December 2025, positioning itself in second place in the audience during primetime with a percentage rating of 18.8 points, being surpassed by Al fondo hay sitio, also airing on América Televisión.
