= Miguel Pérez (Mexican actor) =

Mexican actor (born 1993)

- Born: José Miguel Pérez Saint Martin; 17 September 1993 (age 32); Mexico City, Mexico
- Occupation: Actor Speaker
- Years active: 2002–present

José Miguel Pérez Saint Martin (born 17 September 1993) is a Mexican actor. He is best known for his role in the sitcom La familia P. Luche (2002–2012). He is also a director of the INPODE (Instituto Poblano del Deporte y Juventud).
