= Rosalba Oxandabarat =

Uruguayan journalist

Rosalba Oxandabarat (October 12, 1944 – April 11, 2023) was a Uruguayan journalist and film critic.

Her journalism career began at the weekly newspaper Marcha and continued during her exile in Peru, where she worked for various publications. She returned to Montevideo to join the weekly paper Brecha, which she would go on to direct. She contributed to Brecha until her retirement.

== Biography ==
Rosalba Oxandabarat was born in Salto, Uruguay, in 1944. On her mother's side, she was a descendant of the Uruguayan founding father José Gervasio Artigas.

Oxandabarat studied in the Architecture Department of the University of the Republic, where she was a student activist.

In 1970, she began writing for the weekly newspaper Marcha. After being exiled to Peru in 1974 during the dictatorship, she contributed stories to the newspapers La Crónica, El Caballo Rojo, 30 Días, and El Búho. Her writing included film and book reviews, interviews, and essays.

In the mid-1980s, she returned to Uruguay to work at the newly launched weekly newspaper Brecha. She eventually became the newspaper's culture editor and then its director, from 2008 to 2012, and she continued writing for Brecha until her retirement. She frequently returned to Peru, where in 1995 she served as Brecha's correspondent covering the Cenepa War.

Known for her work as a film critic, Oxandabarat was interested in cinema from a young age. Along with fellow Architecture Department alumni, she collaborated on the 1969 documentary Refusila. The following year, she became a founding member of the Cinemateca del Tercer Mundo (C3M) group, many of whom had joined her in exile in Peru. She was also a member of the Film Critics Association of Uruguay. Among her favorite directors were John Ford, Jean Vigo, and François Truffaut.

Oxandabarat was married to Julián Legaspi, with whom she had two children, Julián and Soledad. She died in Montevideo in 2023, at age 78.

== Awards and honours ==
She was honored by the Cámara Uruguaya del Libro (2012) and with a Premio Morosoli.
