= Julián Legaspi =

Uruguayan-Peruvian actor (born 1973)

Julián Alejandro Legaspi Oxandabarat (born 10 July 1973 in Montevideo) is a Uruguayan-Peruvian actor.

He was born in Uruguay to journalist Rosalba Oxandabarat and Julián Legaspi, who brought their son into exile in Peru during the dictatorship.

Legaspi became famous for his role in the miniseries El ángel vengador: Calígula.

== Televisión ==
- El ángel vengador: Calígula (1993) as Alejandro Samanéz "Calígula".
- Los de arriba y los de abajo (1994) as Cesar Valencia
- Malicia (1995) as Carlos Figari.
- Cuando los ángeles lloran (1995)
- La noche (1996) as Orlando Molina.
- Boulevard Torbellino (1997) as Carlo Del Campo.
- Secretos (1998) as Alberto Costa.
- Isabella, mujer enamorada (1999) as Sebastián Revilla.
- Pobre diabla (2000) as Luis Alberto Miller de las Casas.
- Soledad (2001)
- Luciana y Nicolás (2003) as Renato Echevarría.
- Besos robados (2004) as Samuel Lang.
- Así es la vida (2005) as Ricardo Mendoza Berckemeyer.
- Decisiones (2006), episode "Una luz al final del camino".
- Amores como el nuestro (2006) as Lenín Armas.
- Las dos caras de Ana (2006–07) as Javier Gardel.
- Los exitosos Gome$ (2010) as Ricardo Catalano.
- El enano (2010) as Fausto Mendieta.
- Ana Cristina (2011) as Andrés "Andrew" Gamio.
- Corazón de fuego (2011–12) as Vasco Suárez.
- Solamente milagros (2013), 1 episode as Santiago.
- Derecho de familia (2013), 1 episode as Gustavo.
- Camino a la gloria
- Ciro. El Ángel del Colca (2014)
- Historias Reales- El Aborto (2015)
- Al fondo hay sitio (2015) as Ángel
- Mi Esperanza (2018) as Anibal Gutierrez Ponce
- Dos hermanas (2020–21) as Fernando Berrospi Solari
- Los otros Concha (2024) as Julio "Julito" Ramírez Bazán
- Eres mi bien (2025–26) as Renato Molina
- Valentina valiente (2026) as Rodrigo Aspíllaga

== Films ==
- Yuli (2018) as Cyborg
- Vaguito (2024) as Pancho
