= Bárbara Torres =

Mexican actress

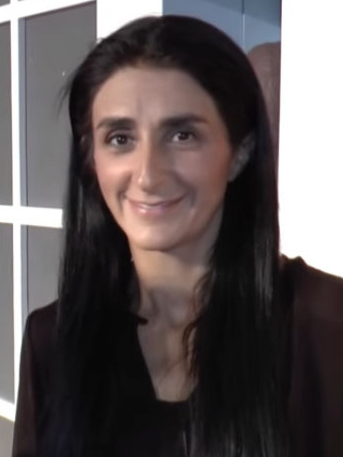
- Torres in 2018
- Born: April 11, 1971 (age 55); Mar del Plata, Buenos Aires, Argentina
- Citizenship: Argentina, Mexico
- Occupation: Actress
- Years active: 2002–present
- Spouse: Pedro Prieto (m. 1997)
- Children: 3

Bárbara Ernestina Torres (born April 11, 1971) is a Mexican television, theatre and film actress best known for her roles in Hospital El Paisa, VidaTV, and as Excelsa in La familia P. Luche.

== Early life and career ==
Barbara was born in Mar del Plata, 254 miles south of Buenos Aires (Argentina). While she was in high school, she studied at the Colegio Superior de Piano, in Mar del Plata, from which she graduated as a piano teacher. She started working at 17 years old. When she finished high school she moved to Buenos Aires, where she entered the Cunill Cabanellas National School of Dramatic Art, from which she graduated with two degrees: a degree in Dramatic Art and in Pedagogy (theatre teacher). In 1998 she moved to Mexico to work in TV commercials. However, she did a casting for the broadcaster Televisa and was hired to participate in La familia P. Luche, a project by Eugenio Derbez in which she worked for ten years until she finished the series.

Since 2013 she worked for two years on the play Por qué las mujeres aman a los pendejos ―Where she played a psychoanalyst named Inés Table―, which she took on tour throughout Mexico alongside the actor Juan Frese. In April 2014 she received an award in Monterrey for the 1,850 performances of the play Claudio, ¿eres... eso?, about discrimination against the LGBT community. In 2015 she worked with Daniela Luján in Blanca Nieves: El Musical, which was performed on Sundays at the Julio Prieto Theater. She also worked on the series Burócratas Inc. and participated in the late-night talk show Estrella2, both by Israel Jaitovich. She had her own theater show titled The Excelsa show. She also participated in the play Caperucita Roja with Javier Carranza.

In 2023, she was part of the cast of the reality television program La casa de los famosos México, from the TelevisaUnivision conglomerate, finishing 9th place overall.

== Selected filmography ==
- La casa de los famosos México (2023)
- Junta de vecinos (2021–2022)
- Sobreamor (2020)
- Lorenza (2019–2020)
- Papá a toda madre (2017–2018)
- Enamorándome de Ramón (2017)
- Despertar contigo (2016)
- La vecina (2015–2016)
- Como dice el dicho (2015)
- Esperanza del corazón (2011–2012)
- La rosa de Guadalupe (2010)
- Niña de mi corazón (2010)
- Humor a quien humor merece (2010)
- Desmadruga2 (2009)
- Adictos (2009)
- Qué tarde tan padre (2008)
- Muévete (2006)
- Hospital El Paisa (2004)
- La familia P. Luche (2002–2012)
