= Tula Rodríguez =

Peruvian exotic dancer

- Years active: 2000 -

Tula Rodríguez is a Peruvian actress and former showgirl dancer. She played the main role of Katlyn in the 2006 film Chicha tu madre.

== Filmography ==
- Pantaleón y las visitadoras (2000) as Peludita
- "Luciana y Nicolás" (2003) TV series as Juanita
- "Locas pasiones" (2004) TV series
- "Las Vírgenes de la cumbia" (2005) TV series
- "Amores como el nuestro" as Maribel Romero (2006)
- "Ferrando, de pura sangre" (2006) TV mini-series
- Chicha tu madre (2006) .... Katlyn
- Avenida Perú (2013) as Yesenia Amasifuén
- Al fondo hay sitio (2016) as Dora
- La otra orilla (2020) as Carmen Sotomayor
- Junta de vecinos (2021) as Jazmín Candela
- Los otros Concha (2024–26) as Estela Ana Lucía Vargas Cóndor
