= XHDRbZ =

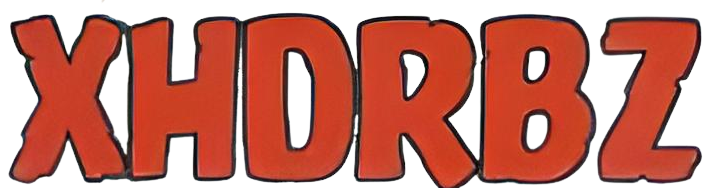
- Also known as: XHDЯBZ
- Genre: Sketch comedy
- Created by: Eugenio Derbez
- Directed by: Eugenio Derbez
- Creative director: Gus Rodríguez
- Starring: Eugenio Derbez
- Theme music composer: Suite Sync (2002, 2003); Sensaciones Sónicas (2004)
- Country of origin: Mexico
- Original language: Spanish

Production
- Executive producer: Eugenio Derbez
- Producers: Eugenio Derbez; Elias Solorio Lara
- Camera setup: Multi-camera
- Running time: 22 minutes
- Production company: Televisa

Original release
- Network: Canal de las Estrellas
- Release: 15 July 2002 – 10 March 2004

Related
- Al derecho y al Derbez; Derbez en cuando; De nuez en cuando; La familia P. Luche

XHDRBZ (Spanish pronunciation: [ˈekis ˈatʃe ðeɾˈβes]; stylized as XHDЯBZ, a wordplay for "XH", a Mexican broadcasting satellite code, and "DRBZ", consonants of Eugenio Derbez' last name) is a Mexican sketch comedy television series created by Eugenio Derbez. It premiered on Canal de las Estrellas on 15 July 2002. XHDRBZ emulated a television channel that broadcasts sketches. The series ended production in 2004, due to Derbez wanting to focus on other projects. The final episode aired on 10 March 2004.

== Format ==
The show emulated a TV channel. When the show began, the screen showed a notification saying that Televisa handed over the transmission to XHDRBZ. The show began with an introduction assimilating that of a Newscast. Each sketch is then presented as if it were a different show; at the end of each sketch showed its cast and credits, like in a real television program. When the actual show finished, it would present a notification that said Televisa would return to its usual broadcast.

== Musical theme ==
In 2002, the musical theme was interpreted by Gerardo Suárez and the music was produced by Suite Sync; in 2004 it was produced by Sensaciones Sónicas, and in 2004 Galilea Montijo took care of the choreography.

== Guests ==
Some of the many guests who have appeared on the show:

- Silvia Derbez
- Galilea Montijo
- Adela Micha
- Andrea Legarreta
- Leticia Calderón
- Brozo
- Héctor Suárez
- Pedro Armendáriz Jr.
- Omar Chaparro
- Silvia Pinal
- Victoria Ruffo and Gabriela Ruffo
- Adal Ramones
- Vicente Fox (President of Mexico at the time of the show)
- Cuauhtémoc Blanco
- Marco Antonio Regil
- Joaquín López Doriga
- Kate del Castillo
- Antonio de Valdez
- Enrique el "Perro" Bermúdez
- Alejandra Guzmán
- Cristina Saralegui
- Xavier Lopez Chabelo
- Amador Narcia
- Enrique Rocha
- Furcio
- Amira
- Lupita D'Alessio
- Sergio Corona
- Enrique Bermundes
- Jacobo Zabludovsky
- Jose Luis Cuevas
- Ernesto Alonoso
- Chespirito
- Miguel Hoffman

== Sketches ==
=== Shows ===
These are some of the shows featured in XHDRBZ. Most of the titles of these are a word game in Spanish, thus it might not make sense with the translation. Title in Spanish provided in brackets.

- The crazy conk (El Lonje Loco), a crazy monk who reads letters from an audience
- Filming (Peliculeando), an actor who shows his latest projects (videos that are the "true definition" of movies; for example, a car screeching is supposed to be "Shreeeeeeek" (Shrek), and a camper peeing on a campfire is supposed to be "Missipippi En Llamas" (Mississippi In Flames); "Missipippi" is an alternate spelling of "me hice pipi", which means, "I peed, or urinated".)
- Top 3 (Top 3 del Momento), this sketch was only seen one time on the program, Derbez portrays a stereotypical man who classifies three songs to the Top 3.
- Someone explain this to me! (¡Que alguien me explique!), Eugenio Derbez plays Hans Pujenhaimer, a German studying Spanish in Mexico, but can't seem to comprehend certain Spanish phrases
- Five incoherences (Las cincoherencias -wordplay), in the sketch, Gustavo "Gus" Rodríguez plays Simón Paz, a man who wears a white tuxedo mixing with white shows and a white wig while Derbez portrays as Nelson Guerra, a man in black besides with Simón Paz, both characters serves as the hosts of their program. In there they expose segments of interviews to mexican telenovelas that are/were aired on Las Estrellas, in which are enlisted to be the five incoherences.
- Medical cases of real life (Medicazos de la vida real) (wordplay, and reference to long-running anthology telenovela Mujer, casos de la vida real), it features Omar Chaparro playing as Pamela Juanjo Lee Jones, a woman who interviews every doctor who comes to visit her office (all being played by Eugenio Derbez), however in one episode, she is replaced by Doña Margara Francisca, who interviews Dr.Otto Rinco. Besides Lee Jones, she has an attendant who delivers the cards that the public sends to her, but mostly when she walks in, Lee Jones scolds her for unknown reasons and even discriminates her for being a "Man".
- Speaking White (Hablemos Blanco), A sketch in which Eugenio attempts to tell a story without vulgar language. He often says a sentence with a brief pause, showing a prop simulating the vulgar term, then says something completely different.
- Section Impossible (Sección Imposible), Sammy Perez and Miguel Luis interview people over holidays- or the city of Acapulco in one episode- with humorous results from their blunders. It uses "unintentional humor" as it is unscripted.
- (Calzón que me toquen bailo), parody of late-night shows like The Tonight Show.
- The little devil (El diablito), Eugenio Derbez plays a devil who makes people fall, trip, or slip (usually funny videos similar to those found on America's Funniest Home Videos) by pushing a big button
- Eugenialities (Eugenialidades - word play), a compilation of different sketches in one.
- Furxhio (bloopers), word play at another Televisa show called Furcio.
- The X-Files (Los ex-pendientes secretos X), parody of X-Files as the title says.
- The Macabre hour (La hora Macabrona), word play and hidden usage of the Spanish swear word "cabrón"
- Eloy Gameno ("El Oigame No") (The "Excuse Me, No" - word play), a flimsy guy who gets into wordplay arguments and ends up getting choked by the other person
- Merylin Menshow (Marilyn Manson), one of the many characters, satire and word play
- 100 unemployed people said.. (100 mexicans said, 100 desempleados dijeron), (TV game show, a parody of Family Feud) - satire)
- Alz and Heimer (Alz y Heimer) (word play with Alzheimer), An elderly couple with hearing issues who tell anecdotes that are misinterpreted by one another.
- XHDRBZ commercials (satire commercials)
- Lifestyles (Estilos de vida), a satire way of knowing how people in different countries live.
- Talks of love and trust (Pláticas de amor y confianza), a parody of those talk shows like Laura (talk show) or The Jerry Springer Show.
- Super Goalkeeper (Super Portero), A goalkeeper who tries to stop others from using sexual innuendo or words similar to brand names in tv to prevent copyright issues.
- One day in the life of... (Un Dia en la vida de..), a satire way of knowing how celebrities live their everyday life.
- Cooking with Mr. Pepe Roni (Cocinando con Don Pepe Roni) (word play with Pepperoni) A segment with an eccentric chef who uses puns and wordplay to cook strange variants of meals.
- The Plush Family (La familia P. Luche), a comedy tv show which would later become a spinoff of XHDRBZ.
- Adventures of Agent D. Zent (Las aventuras del Agente D. Zente - word play of the word decente), an agent that tries to find the "weirdest" cases.
- (Armando Hoyos) (word play with putting holes together) An etymology professor translating words bit-by-bit in a very literal way. He also shares "philosophical" ideas based on pop culture.
- Aderberaz reports (Reportajes de Aberberaz), parody of news reports.
- (Sin To Ni Zon), an animated game show that pokes fun at the cartoons at the time.
- Cooking with Tony (Cocinando con Toño) Toño de Valdés showing the easiest recipes.
- The Stroll Around Everywhere (La Paz sea por todas partes) (wordplay also meaning Peace Be Everywhere when pronounced as such), A segment meant to teach others about peace, love, and anger management hosted by the guru Nicolas Tranquilino. He always spirals into a rage because of his blundering production team. He is Eugenio's most violent and foul-mouthed character.

=== Soap operas ===
XHDRBZ broadcast certain soap operas, usually satires of real Mexican ones, including:-

- One of wolves (Una de lobos - Cuna de lobos (soap opera) satire)
- Bread-baker school (Escuela de panaderos)
- Suspicion (La sospecha)
- Trace of the past (El rastro del pasado)
- Between love and hate (Entre el amor y el odio)
- Mary from the neighbourhood (María la del Barrio- satire)

=== Short stories ===
Satire of classic short stories, novels, etc.

- Peter Pun (satire of Peter Pan, closest meaning: Peter Fart)
- Betty la feya y la bestia (satire, mix of "Beauty and the Beast" and "Ugly Betty")
- Romero y Chulieta (satire of Romeo and Juliet, closest meaning: Rosemary and Chop)
- Blanca Nueves (satire of Snow White meaning White Nines, wordplay on Nieves meaning snow)

=== Special broadcasts ===
- The best of the 2002 FIFA World Cup (Lo Mejor del mundial 2002) - Feature transmission during the 2002 Korea-Japan Worldcup.
- XHDRBZ First (Primer XHDRBZ)- Transmits various TV celebrities mentioning the XHDRBZ sketches they appeared in.
- XHDRBZ Last (Último XHDRBZ) - Transmission where the producer communicates through a sketch that the show will cease transmitting for a period of time.
