= La sacamos del estadio =

- Theatrical release poster
- Directed by: Oswaldo Aldana
- Written by: Oswaldo Aldana
- Starring: Emanuel Soriano; Macla Yamada; Bruno Odar; Andrea Luna; Javier Dulzaidas; Nicolás Fantinato; Marisela Puicón; José Dammert
- Cinematography: Oswaldo Aldana
- Edited by: Jhoel Mori
- Music by: Martín Choy-Yin
- Production company: Films Entertainment
- Distributed by: Andes Films
- Release date: June 7, 2018
- Running time: 76 minutes
- Country: Peru
- Language: Spanish

La sacamos del estadio (lit. 'We took her out of the stadium') is a 2018 Peruvian sports comedy film written and directed by Oswaldo Aldana in his directorial debut. It stars Emanuel Soriano, Macla Yamada, Bruno Odar, Andrea Luna, Javier Dulzaidas, Nicolás Fantinato, Marisela Puicón and José Dammert. It premiered on June 7, 2018, in Peruvian theaters.

== Synopsis ==
Nicolás, a soccer fan who dreams of going to the World Cup in Russia to follow his soccer team, which qualified after 36 years. His motivation is to be able to take his father, from whom he has inherited his passion and who could not see the qualifying match.

== Cast ==
The actors participating in this film are:

- Emanuel Soriano as Nicolás
- Macla Yamada as Patricia
- Nicolás Fantinato
- Marisela Puicón
- Andrea Luna
- Bruno Odar
- Nicolás Argolo
- José Dammert
- Javier Dulzaides
- Georgette Cárdenas
- Gianina Marquina
- Aaron Olazabal
