= Junta de vecinos =

Peruvian television series

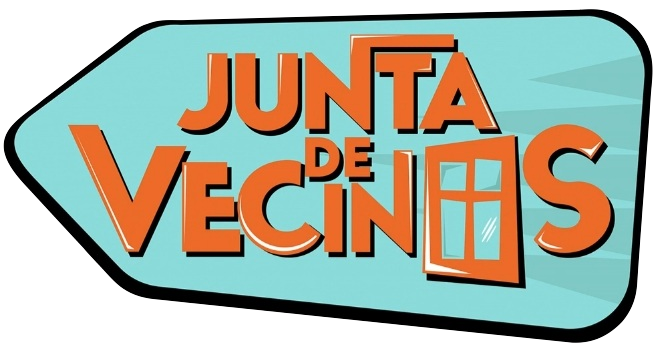
- Genre: Telenovela
- Created by: Mariana Silva
- Written by: Mariana Silva; Jesús Álvarez Betancourt; Italo Cordano; Ximena Basadre; Mateo Chiarella
- Directed by: Luis Barrios; Miluska Rosas
- Creative directors: Mariana Ramírez del Villar; Diana Solís
- Starring: Cynthia Klitbo; Bárbara Torres; Miguel Iza; Sergio Galliani
- Theme music composer: Jorge Sabogal
- Opening theme: "Junta de vecinos" by Tommy Portugal
- Composer: Jesús Levano
- Country of origin: Peru
- Original language: Spanish
- No. of seasons: 2
- No. of episodes: 132

Production
- Executive producers: Cecilia Rodríguez; Nataly Mendoza
- Producer: Miguel Zuloaga
- Cinematography: Fernando Vega; Alberto Vega
- Editor: Milagros Melchor
- Camera setup: Multi-camera
- Production company: ProTV Producciones

Original release
- Network: América Televisión
- Release: 13 December 2021 – 21 June 2022

Junta de vecinos is a Peruvian telenovela created by Mariana Silva. It aired on América Televisión from 13 December 2021 to 21 June 2022. The series follows the conflicts between the residents of a building and their neighbors. It stars Cynthia Klitbo, Bárbara Torres, Miguel Iza and Sergio Galliani.

== Plot ==
The story takes place in the Roma building, telling the stories of each of its residents, including Genoveva de la Colina, a Peruvian actress who emigrated to Mexico and managed to become one of the most sought-after actresses of all time, considered by the media as "the diva of divas". Genoveva makes a terrible mistake and because of this "regrettable incident", she is banned from the Latin market. After many years, she is forced to return to her deceased parents' house in Lima. There, she reunites with the love of her life, Américo Collareta, who years earlier had left her at the altar.

The building is guarded by Pachuco Domínguez, a cheerful and friendly doorman, who is so kind-hearted and supportive that he is an easy target for some neighbors. However, his fate will change with the death of Mr. Víctor, who leaves him everything he owns, including his apartment. He moves in with his wife Chela Chumacero and their son Kevin. Unlike Pachuco, Chela is extremely stingy and controlling. She is always coming up with some business venture and scolding him for not having the ambition she has to get ahead. Thus, various characters will appear in the residence, each with different experiences that they will have to live with.

== Cast ==
- Cynthia Klitbo as Genoveva de la Colina (seasons 1-2)
- Bárbara Torres (season 1) (Note: Torres portrays Chela from episodes 1 to 69.) and Camila Mac Lennan (season 2) (Note: Mac Lennan portrays Chela from episodes 70 to 80 in a guest role.) as Graciela "Chela" Chumacero Chavlín de Domínguez
- Miguel Iza as Padinton "Pachuco" Domínguez (seasons 1-2)
- Sergio Galliani as Américo Collareta (seasons 1-2)
- Karina Jordán as Dr. Natalia Alarcón Tarareta (seasons 1-2)
- Juan Ignacio Di Marco as Benjamín Pereira (seasons 1-2)
- Priscila Espinoza as Micaela Morales de la Colina (seasons 1-2)
- Bernardo Scerpella as Kevin Domínguez Chumacero (seasons 1-2)
- Ximena Palomino as Lucía Fernández / Lucía Domínguez Fernández / Lucía Collareta Fernández (seasons 1-2)
- Andrés Wiese as Sebastián Morales de la Colina / Lulu Rivar (seasons 1-2)
- Lilian Schiappa-Pietra as Verónica Teodora Arriola Monje (seasons 1-2)
- Fausto Molina as Juan José Lizardo "Jota" Concha Chamiz (seasons 1-2)
- Micheille Soifer as Danitza Arévalo (season 1)
- Tula Rodríguez as Jazmín Candela (season 1)
- Mariella Zanetti as Azucena Candela Candela (season 1)
- Claudio Calmet as Alonso Martínez (seasons 1-2)
- Luis Baca as Franco Gallardo (seasons 1-2)
- Patricia Barreto as Killa Poblete (seasons 1-2)
- Emanuel Soriano as Luis "Lucho" Gustavo (seasons 1-2)
- Almudena García as Martina Collareta (seasons 1-2)
- Fabián Alva as Rodrigo Martínez Alarcón (seasons 1-2)
- Patricia Alquinta as Frida María Tarareta (season 2)
- Andrea Luna as Valentina Santa María (season 2)
- Óscar Meza as Amaru (season 2)
- Juan Vidal as Dr. Elías Gamero (season 2)

== Reception ==
The telenovela premiered on 13 December 2021, positioning itself in second place in the audience during primetime with a percentage rating of 21.9 points, being surpassed by Luz de luna, also airing on América Televisión.
