= El Gran Show season 5 =

El Gran Show
- Season 5
- Hosted by: Gisela Valcárcel; Aldo Díaz; Cristian Rivero
- Judges: Morella Petrozzi; Carlos Alcántara; Pachi Valle Riestra
- Celebrity winner: Jesús Neyra
- Professional winner: Lucero Clavijo
- No. of episodes: 14

Release
- Original network: América Televisión
- Original release: August 6 – October 29, 2011

Season chronology
- ← Previous; Season 4 Next → Season 6

Season two of the 2011 edition of El gran show premiered on August 6, 2011.

In this season the score "11" was added, which symbolizes the perfection of the performance. It was enabled from the fourth week, being Anahí de Cárdenas and John Cáceres the first couple to obtain it.

On October 29, 2011, Jesús Neyra and Lucero Clavijo were crowned champions, Belén Estévez and Waldir Felipa finished second, while Maricielo Effio and Elí Vela finished third.

== Cast ==
=== Couples ===
On July 30, 2015, the heroes and dreamers were released in a special episode. For this season, several former participants returned, including Belén Estévez, Jesús Neyra, Maricielo Effio, Anahí de Cárdenas y Marisol Aguirre. Denny Valdeiglesias became the first participant to belong to the production of the show. Due to what happened last season with the six dreamers eliminated, only returned Carmen Varillas, Gloria Cerdán and Jhon Cáceres.

During week 7, Maricielo Effio suffered an injury while dancing in the versus, in addition to having a sprain of second degree, reason why was replaced by the actress and singer Tati Alcántara in weeks 8 and 9.

Celebrity	Notability (known for)	Dreamer	Status
Maribel Velarde	Vedette & TV host	Juan Manuel Grau	Eliminated 1st on August 13, 2011
José "Chatín" Almanza	Comedian	Roxana Dávila	Eliminated 2nd on August 27, 2011
Renato Bonifaz	Actor	Gloria Cerdán	Eliminated 3rd on September 10, 2011
Denny Valdeiglesias	Television producer	Tiffany Díaz	Eliminated 4th on September 17, 2011
Anahí de Cárdenas	Actress, singer & model	John Cáceres	Eliminated 5th on October 1, 2011
Erika Villalobos	Actress, singer & TV host	André Lecca	Eliminated 6th on October 8, 2011
Ariel Bracamonte	Television personality	Grecia Lazarte	Eliminated 7th on October 15, 2011
Marisol Aguirre	Actress, TV host & model	Jorge Avila	Eliminated 8th on October 22, 2011
Jean Paul Santa María	Model	Carmen Varillas	Eliminated 9th on October 29, 2011
Maricielo Effio	Actress & model	Elí Vela	Third place on October 29, 2011
Belén Estévez	Former vedette	Waldir Felipa	Runner-up on October 29, 2011
Jesús Neyra	Actor	Lucero Clavijo	Winners on October 29, 2011

=== Host and judges ===
Gisela Valcárcel, Aldo Díaz and Cristian Rivero returned as hosts, while Morella Petrozzi, Carlos Alcántara, Pachi Valle Riestra and the VIP Jury returned as judges. In week 10, the singer and choreographer Abel Talamántez replaced Alcántara.

== Scoring charts ==
Couple	Place	1	2	3	4	5	6	7	8	9	10	11	12	13	
Couple	Place	1	2	3	4	5	6	7	8	9	10	11	12	Top 4	Top 3
Jesús & Lucero	1	36	38	38	36	40	42	37	42	39	75	79	82	78	+85=163
Belén & Waldir	2	36	37	42	38	44	42	43	43	42	78	86	80	78	+80=158
Maricielo & Elí	3	40	40	38	40	42	41	36	42	44	73	78	79	75	+82=157
Jean Paul & Carmen	4	33	30	37	37	37	40	37	37	38	70	78	75	74	
Marisol & Jorge	5	32	33	36	37	39	38	39	40	37	72	78	69		
Ariel & Grecia	6	32	32	33	33	35	32	34	37	35	67	69			
Erika & André	7	34	34	38	32	35	35	44	37	35	72				
Anahí & John	8	33	38	40	43	39	41	42	36	38					
Denny & Tiffany	9	31	32	33	34	38	35	35							
Renato & Gloria	10	31	34	30	34	35	38								
Chatín & Roxana	11	34	31	32	33										
Maribel & Juan Manuel	12	30	33												

Red numbers indicate the sentenced for each week
Green numbers indicate the best steps for each week
the couple was eliminated that week
the couple was safe in the duel
the couple was eliminated that week and safe with a lifeguard
the winning couple
the runner-up couple
the third-place couple

=== Average score chart ===
This table only counts dances scored on a 40-point scale.

Rank by average	Place	Couple	Total points	Number of dances	Average
1	2	Belén & Waldir	741	19	39.0
2	3	Maricielo & Elí	732	19	38.5
3	1	Jesús & Lucero	724	19	38.1
4	8	Anahí & John	338	9	37.6
5	5	Marisol & Jorge	543	15	36.2
6	4	Jean Paul & Carmen	610	17	35.8
7	7	Erika & André	387	11	35.2
8	9	Denny & Tiffany	236	7	33.7
9	6	Ariel & Grecia	433	13	33.3
10	10	Renato & Gloria	198	6	33.0
11	11	Chatín & Roxana	130	4	32.5
12	12	Maribel & Juan Manuel	63	2	31.5

=== Highest and lowest scoring performances ===
The best and worst performances in each dance according to the judges' 40-point scale are as follows:

Dance	Highest scored dancer(s)	Highest score	Lowest scored dancer(s)	Lowest score
Latin pop	Maricielo Effio	40	Maribel Velarde	30
Salsa	Maricielo Effio; Belén Estévez; Jesús Neyra	40	Jean Paul Santa María	30
Merengue	Belén Estévez; Jesús Neyra	40	Renato Bonifaz	34
Jazz	Tati Alcántara	40	Ariel Bracamonte	32
Cumbia	Belén Estévez; Jesús Neyra	40	Denny Valdeiglesias; Ariel Bracamonte	33
Disco	Anahí de Cárdenas; Belén Estévez	40	Renato Bonifaz	30
Reggaeton	Anahí de Cárdenas	40	Denny Valdeiglesias	33
Tex-mex	Belén Estévez	40	Jean Paul Santa María	35
Festejo	Ariel Bracamonte	34	—	—
Tango	Érika Villalobos	40	—	—
Guaracha	Jesús Neyra	38	Denny Valdeiglesias	35
Merengue house	Tati Alcántara; Belén Estévez	40	Érika Villalobos	35
Adagio	Anahí de Cárdenas	38	Ariel Bracamonte	31
Marinera	Maricielo Effio	39	Ariel Bracamonte	37
Axé	Maricielo Effio; Belén Estévez	40	Ariel Bracamonte	34
Cha-cha-cha	Belén Estévez	40	Marisol Aguirre	34
Paso doble	Maricielo Effio	40	Jean Paul Santa María	36
Mix	Belén Estévez	40	Jesús Neyra	36
Freestyle	Jesús Neyra	40	Maricielo Effio	36
Quickstep	Belén Estévez; Maricielo Effio; Jesús Neyra	40	—	—

=== Couples' highest and lowest scoring dances ===
Scores are based upon a potential 40-point maximum.

Couples	Highest scoring dance(s)	Lowest scoring dance(s)
Jesús & Lucero	Cumbia, Merengue, Freestyle, Salsa & Quickstep (40)	Reggaeton (34)
Belén & Waldir	Disco, Cumbia (x2), Merengue, Tex-mex, Salsa (x2), Merengue house, Axé, Cha-cha-cha, Mix & Quickstep (40)	Latin pop (36)
Maricielo & Elí	Latin pop, Salsa (x2), Jazz, Merengue house, Axé, Paso doble & Quickstep (40)	Tex-mex, Latin pop & Freestyle (36)
Jean Paul & Carmen	Jazz (39)	Salsa (30)
Marisol & Jorge	Cumbia, Salsa & Axé (39)	Latin pop (32)
Ariel & Grecia	Cumbia (36)	Adagio (31)
Erika & André	Tango (40)	Reggaeton (31)
Anahí & John	Disco & Reggaeton (40)	Latin pop (33)
Denny & Tiffany	Salsa (38)	Latin pop (31)
Renato & Gloria	Latin pop (36)	Disco (30)
Chatín & Roxana	Latin pop (34)	Salsa (31)
Maribel & Juan Manuel	Jazz (33)	Latin pop (30)

== Weekly scores ==
Individual judges' scores in the charts below (given in parentheses) are listed in this order from left to right: Morella Petrozzi, Carlos Alcántara, Pachi Valle Riestra, VIP Jury.

=== Week 1: Latin Pop ===
The couples danced latin pop.

Running order

Couple	Scores	Dance	Music	Result
Belén & Waldir	36 (9, 9, 9, 9)	Latin pop	"Loca"—Shakira feat. El Cata	Safe
Jean Paul & Carmen	33 (8, 8, 8, 9)	Latin pop	"Lo Que No Sabes Tú"—Chino & Nacho feat. El Potro Álvarez y Baroni	Safe
Anahí & John	33 (9, 8, 8, 8)	Latin pop	"Dame Más"—Ricky Martin	Safe
Jesús & Lucero	35 (8, 9, 9, 9)	Latin pop	"Verano Azul"—Juan Magan	Safe
Denny & Tiffany	31 (7, 8, 7, 9)	Latin pop	"Bulería"—David Bisbal	Sentenced
Erika & André	33 (8, 8, 8, 9)	Latin pop	"Rabiosa—Shakira feat. El Cata	Safe
Chatín & Roxana	34 (8, 9, 8, 9)	Latin pop	"Tú No Eres Para Mi"—Fanny Lú	Safe
Maribel & Juan Manuel	30 (7, 8, 7, 8)	Latin pop	"Candela"—Noelia	Sentenced
Ariel & Grecia	32 (8, 8, 7, 9)	Latin pop	"Baila Baila"—Chayanne	Safe
Marisol & Jorge	32 (8, 8, 8, 8)	Latin pop	"Oye el Boom"—David Bisbal	Safe
Renato & Gloria	31 (7, 8, 8, 8)	Latin pop	"Danza Kuduro"—Don Omar feat. Lucenzo	Sentenced
Maricielo & Elí	40 (10, 10, 10, 10)	Latin pop	"Pa' Que lo Tengas Claro"—Franco & Oscarcito	Best steps

=== Week 2: Salsa ===
The couples (except those sentenced) danced salsa.

Running order

Couple	Scores	Dance	Music	Result
Marisol & Jorge	33 (8, 8, 8, 9)	Salsa	"Ven Morena"—Oscar D'León	Safe
Jesús & Lucero	38 (10, 10, 9, 9)	Salsa	"La Salsa Vive"—Tito Nieves	Safe
Anahí & John	38 (10, 10, 9, 9)	Salsa	"En Barranquilla Me Quedo"—Joe Arroyo	Safe
Renato & Gloria	34 (8, 8, 8, 10)	Merengue*	"Me Enamoro de Ella" / "Woman del Callao"—Juan Luis Guerra	Safe
Maribel & Juan Manuel	33 (8, 8, 8, 9)	Jazz*	"Echa Pa' Lante""—Thalía	—
Denny & Tiffany	32 (8, 7, 7, 10)	Cumbia*	"La Caderona"—Los Villacorta	Safe
Ariel & Grecia	32 (8, 7, 8, 9)	Salsa	"Juliana"—DLG	Safe
Erika & André	34 (8, 8, 8, 10)	Salsa	"Las Cajas"—Joe Arroyo	Safe
Belén & Waldir	37 (9, 9, 9, 10)	Salsa	"Químbara"—DLG	Safe
Maricielo & Elí	40 (10, 10, 10, 10)	Salsa	"Aguanile"—Willie Colón & Héctor Lavoe	Best steps
Chatín & Roxana	31 (8, 7, 8, 8)	Salsa	"Que Cosa Tan Linda"—Oscar D'León	Sentenced
Jean Paul & Carmen	30 (8, 7, 8, 7)	Salsa	"Que Se Sepa"—Roberto Roena	Sentenced

*The duel

- Renato & Gloria: Safe
- Maribel & Juan Manuel: Eliminated
- Denny & Tiffany: Safe

=== Week 3: Disco ===
The couples danced disco (except those sentenced) and a danceathon of salsa.

Running order

Couple	Scores	Dance	Music	Result
Renato & Gloria	30 (8, 7, 7, 8)	Disco	"Born to Be Alive"—Patrick Hernandez	Sentenced
Jesús & Lucero	38 (10, 10, 9, 9)	Disco	"Disco Inferno"—The Trammps	Safe
Anahí & John	40 (10, 10, 10, 10)	Disco	"You Should Be Dancing"—Bee Gees	Safe
Jean Paul & Carmen	37 (10, 10, 8, 9)	Pop Latino*	"Boom Boom" / "Salomé" / "Provócame""—Chayanne	Safe
Chatín & Roxana	32 (8, 8, 7, 9)	Latin pop*	"Fruta Fresca" / "Mi Caballito" / "Y Ahí Llego Yo"—Carlos Vives	Sentenced
Erika & André	38 (10, 10, 8, 10)	Disco	"Last Dance"—Donna Summer	Safe
Ariel & Grecia	33 (8, 8, 7, 10)	Disco	"Turn the Beat Around"—Gloria Estefan	Safe
Maricielo & Elí	38 (9, 10, 9, 10)	Disco	"Don't Stop 'til You Get Enough"—Michael Jackson	Safe
Belén & Waldir	40 (10, 10, 10, 10)	Disco	"Boogie Wonderland"—Earth, Wind & Fire	Best steps
Denny & Tiffany	33 (8, 8, 7, 10)	Disco	"I Will Survive"—Gloria Gaynor	Safe
Marisol & Jorge	36 (9, 10, 8, 9)	Disco	"On the Radio"—Donna Summer	Safe
Marisol & Jorge; Chatín & Roxana; Renato & Gloria; Ariel & Grecia; Anahí & John; Maricielo & Elí; Belén & Waldir; Jesús & Lucero; Jean Paul & Carmen; Denny & Tiffany; Erika & André	2	Salsa (The danceathon)	"Gozando en La Habana"—La Charanga Habanera	

*The duel

- Jean Paul & Carmen: Eliminated (but safe with the lifeguard)
- Chatín & Roxana: Safe

=== Week 4: Reggaeton ===
The couples danced reggaetón (except those sentenced) and a team dance of Bollywood.

Running order

Couple	Scores	Dance	Music	Result
Jesús & Lucero	34 (8, 8, 9, 9)	Reggaeton	"Noche de Entierro (Nuestro Amor)"—Luny Tunes	Safe
Maricielo & Elí	38 (9, 10, 9, 10)	Reggaeton	"Veo Veo"—Los Guajiros del Puerto	Safe
Erika & André	31 (7, 8, 8, 8)	Reggaeton	"Ella Me Levantó"—Daddy Yankee	Sentenced
Belén & Waldir	38 (9, 10, 9, 10)	Reggaeton	"Quema Quema"—Aldo & Dandy	Safe
Renato & Gloria	32 (8, 8, 8, 8)	Latin pop*	"Por Arriba, Por Abajo" / "La Bomba" / "María"—Ricky Martin	Sentenced
Chatín & Roxana	33 (7, 9, 8, 9)	Jazz*	"Cuban Pete"—Desi Arnaz / "Hey Pachuco"—Royal Crown Revue	—
Denny & Tiffany	32 (7, 8, 8, 9)	Reggaeton	"Culipandeo"—DJ Warner	Sentenced
Anahí & John	41 (10, 11, 10, 10)	Reggaeton	"El Ritmo No Perdona (Prende)"—Daddy Yankee	Best steps
Ariel & Grecia	33 (8, 9, 8, 9)	Reggaeton	"Gasolina"—Daddy Yankee	Safe
Marisol & Jorge	37 (8, 10, 9, 10)	Reggaeton	"Rakata"—Wisin & Yandel	Safe
Jean Paul & Carmen	37 (8, 11, 9, 9)	Reggaeton	"The Anthem"—Pitbull feat. Lil Jon	Safe
Marisol & Jorge; Chatín & Roxana; Ariel & Grecia; Belén & Waldir; Jean Paul & Carmen; Erika & André	0	Bollywood (Team A)	"Ishq Kamina"—Alka Yagnik & Sonu Nigam "Sabu Mayare Baya"—Akshaya Mohanty & Anuradha Paudwal	
Renato & Gloria; Anahí & John; Maricielo & Elí; Jesús & Lucero; Denny & Tiffany	2	Bollywood (Team B)	"Jai Ho"—A. R. Rahman "Discowale Khisko"—KK, Sunidhi Chauhan & Rana Mazumder	

*The duel

- Renato & Gloria: Safe
- Chatín & Roxana: Eliminated

=== Week 5: Cumbia ===
The couples danced cumbia (except those sentenced) and a team dance of hula.

Running order

Couple	Scores	Dance	Music	Result
Jean Paul & Carmen	35 (9, 9, 8, 9)	Cumbia	"La Ricotona"—Armonía 10	Safe
Anahí & John	39 (11, 11, 8, 9)	Cumbia	"Tu Hipocresía"—Grupo 5	Safe
Belén & Waldir	42 (11, 11, 10, 10)	Cumbia	"El Tao Tao"—Grupo 5	Best steps
Renato & Gloria	35 (9, 8, 9, 9)	Jazz*	"You're the One That I Want" / "We Go Together"—from Grease	Sentenced
Denny & Tiffany	38 (10, 9, 9, 10)	Salsa*	"Ricky Ricón" / "Muévete"—La Charanga Habanera	Safe
Erika & André	33 (8, 8, 8, 9)	Jazz*	"The Edge of Glory" / "Born This Way"—Lady Gaga	Sentenced
Ariel & Grecia	33 (8, 8, 8, 9)	Cumbia	"La Escobita"—Marisol y la Magia del Norte	Sentenced
Jesús & Lucero	40 (10, 10, 10, 10)	Cumbia	"La Terecumbia"—Tommy Portugal	Safe
Marisol & Jorge	39 (10, 10, 9, 10)	Cumbia	"Dos Locos"—Los Villacorta	Safe
Maricielo & Elí	40 (11, 10, 9, 10)	Cumbia	"Así Son los Hombres"—Marina Yafac	Safe
Ariel & Grecia; Maricielo & Elí; Belén & Waldir; Jean Paul & Carmen; Erika & André	2	Hula (Team A)	"Mash It Up"—Burning Flames	
Marisol & Jorge; Renato & Gloria; Anahí & John; Jesús & Lucero; Denny & Tiffany	0	Hula (Team B)	"I Command You"—Burning Flames	

*The duel

- Renato & Gloria: Eliminated (but safe with the lifeguard)
- Marrón & Tiffany: Safe
- Erika & André: Safe

=== Week 6: Merengue ===
The couples (except those sentenced) danced merengue. In the versus, the couples faced dancing jazz.

Running order

Couple	Scores	Dance	Music	Result
Anahí & John	39 (10, 10, 9, 10)	Merengue	"El Tiki Tiki"—Oro Duro	Safe
Maricielo & Elí	39 (10, 10, 9, 10)	Merengue	"Chicharrón"—Oro Sólido	Safe
Ariel & Grecia	32 (8, 8, 7, 9)	Jazz*	"Dov'è l'amore" / "Strong Enough" / "Believe"—Cher	Sentenced
Renato & Gloria	36 (9, 9, 8, 10)	Latin pop*	"Hips Don't Lie" / "La Tortura"—Shakira	—
Erika & André	33 (8, 8, 7, 10)	Jazz*	"Lejos de Ti"—Gian Marco	Sentenced
Belén & Waldir	42 (11, 11, 10, 10)	Merengue	"Ya Llegó el Verano"—La Banda Chula	Best steps
Jesús & Lucero	42 (11, 11, 10, 10)	Merengue	"Una Nalgadita"—Oro Sólido	Best steps
Marisol & Jorge	36 (9, 9, 8, 10)	Merengue	"La Tanguita Roja"—Oro Sólido	Safe
Denny & Tiffany	35 (9, 9, 7, 10)	Merengue	"El Blablazo"—Toño Rosario	Sentenced
Jean Paul & Carmen	40 (11, 11, 8, 10)	Merengue	"Conga Pal' Carnaval"—La Banda Chula	Safe

The versus
Couple	Judges' votes	Dance	Music	Result
Marisol & Jorge	Marisol, Marisol, Marisol	Jazz	"Claridad"—Menudo	Winners (2 pts)
Denny & Tiffany	Marisol, Marisol, Marisol	Jazz	"Súbete a mi Moto"—Menudo	Losers
Anahí & John	Jesús, Anahí, Anahí	Jazz	"Billie Jean"—Michael Jackson	Winners (2 pts)
Jesús & Lucero	Jesús, Anahí, Anahí	Jazz	"Thriller"—Michael Jackson	Losers
Renato & Gloria	Renato, Renato, Renato	Jazz	"El Apagón"—Yuri	Winners (2 pts)
Ariel & Grecia	Renato, Renato, Renato	Jazz	"Hombres al Borde de un Ataque de Celos"—Yuri	Losers
Erika & André	Erika, Jean Paul, Erika	Jazz	"Don't Stop Me Now"—Freddie Mercury	Winners (2 pts)
Jean Paul & Carmen	Erika, Jean Paul, Erika	Jazz	"Living on My Own"—Freddie Mercury	Losers
Maricielo & Elí	Maricielo, Maricielo, Maricielo	Jazz	"Open Your Heart"—Madonna	Winners (2 pts)
Belén & Waldir	Maricielo, Maricielo, Maricielo	Jazz	"Material Girl"—Madonna	Losers

*The duel

- Ariel & Grecia: Safe
- Renato & Gloria: Eliminated
- Erika & André: Safe

=== Week 7: Tex-Mex ===
The couples (except those sentenced) danced tex-mex. In the versus, the couples faced dancing jazz.

Maricielo Effio suffered an injury when he made her performance in the versus, so Marisol Aguirre and Jorge Ávila won the 2 extra points.

Running order

Couple	Scores	Dance	Music	Result
Maricielo & Elí	36 (9, 9, 8, 10)	Tex-mex	"El Chico del Apartamento 512"—Selena	Sentenced
Jesús & Lucero	37 (9, 9, 9, 10)	Tex-mex	"No Tengo Dinero"—Kumbia Kings feat. Juan Gabriel y El Gran Silencio	Safe
Belén & Waldir	43 (11, 11, 11, 10)	Tex-mex	"Techno Cumbia"—Selena	Safe
Ariel & Grecia	34 (8, 8, 8, 10)	Festejo*	"Raíces del Festejo"—Perú Negro	Sentenced
Erika & André	42 (11, 11, 10, 10)	Tango*	"El Tango de Roxanne"—Adalí Montero	Best steps
Denny & Tiffany	35 (8, 9, 8, 10)	Guaracha*	"La Corneta"—Daniel Santos / "Cachita""—Raison Group	—
Anahí & John	40 (11, 9, 10, 10)	Tex-mex	"Bidi Bidi Bom Bom""—Selena	Safe
Marisol & Jorge	37 (9, 10, 9, 9)	Tex-mex	"Baila Esta Cumbia"—Selena	Safe
Jean Paul & Carmen	35 (8, 9, 8, 10)	Tex-mex	"Bandido""—Ana Bárbara	Safe

The versus
Couple	Judges' votes	Dance	Music	Result
Marisol & Jorge	—	Jazz	"Toxic"—Britney Spears	Winners (2 pts)
Maricielo & Elí	—	Jazz	"Me Against the Music"—Britney Spears feat. Madonna	Losers
Jean Paul & Carmen	Jean Paul, Jean Paul, Jesús	Jazz	"Telephone"—Lady Gaga feat. Beyoncé	Winners (2 pts)
Jesús & Lucero	Jean Paul, Jean Paul, Jesús	Jazz	"Poker Face"—Lady Gaga	Losers
Erika & André	Erika, Erika, Erika	Jazz	"Hay que venir al sur"—Raffaella Carrà	Winners (2 pts)
Denny & Tiffany	Erika, Erika, Erika	Jazz	"Explota Mi Corazón"—Raffaella Carrà	Losers
Ariel & Grecia	Erika, Erika, Erika	Jazz	"Fiesta"—Raffaella Carrà	Losers
Anahí & John	Anahí, Anahí, Anahí	Jazz	"Arrasando"—Thalía	Winners (2 pts)
Belén & Waldir	Anahí, Anahí, Anahí	Jazz	"Mujer Latina"—Thalía	Losers

*The duel

- Ariel & Grecia: Safe
- Erika & André: Safe
- Denny & Tiffany: Eliminated

=== Week 8: Trio Salsa ===
The couples (except those sentenced) danced trio salsa involving a member of the troupe. In the versus, the couples faced dancing the world dances.

Due to the injury that Maricielo Effio suffered last week, Tati Alcántara danced instead.

Running order

Couple (Trio Dance Partner)	Scores	Dance	Music	Result
Jean Paul & Carmen (Stephanie Palacios)	35 (9, 9, 8, 9)	Salsa	"Juana Magdalena"—La Charanga Habanera	Safe
Erika & André (Pedro Ibañez)	37 (10, 8, 9, 10)	Salsa	"Gozando en La Habana"—La Charanga Habanera	Safe
Anahí & John (Raúl Romero)	34 (8, 8, 8, 10)	Salsa	"El Temba"—La Charanga Habanera	Sentenced
Ariel & Grecia	35 (9, 9, 8, 9)	Latin pop*	"Una Noche Más" / "Let's Get Loud"—Jennifer Lopez	Sentenciados
Tati & Elí	42 (11, 11, 10, 10)	Jazz*	"Express" / "Show Me How You Burlesque""—Christina Aguilera	Safe
Marisol & Jorge (Christian Navarro)	40 (10, 11, 9, 10)	Salsa	"El Águila"—Manolito y su Trabuco	Safe
Belén & Waldir (Gian Frank Navarro)	43 (11, 11, 11, 10)	Salsa	"Abre Que Voy""—Los Van Van	Best steps
Jesús & Lucero (Juan Pablo Lostannau)	40 (10, 11, 9, 10)	Salsa	"Temba, Tumba, Timba"—Los Van Van	Safe

The versus
Couple	Judges' votes	Dance	Music	Result
Jean Paul & Carmen	Jean Paul, Marisol, Jean Paul	(United States) Rock and roll	"Rock Around the Clock"—Bill Haley & His Comets	Winners (2 pts)
Marisol & Jorge	Jean Paul, Marisol, Jean Paul	(United States) Rock and roll	"Jailhouse Rock"—Elvis Presley	Losers
Jesús & Lucero	Tati, Jesús, Jesús	(Argentina) Tango	"Tanguera"—Sexteto Mayor	Winners (2 pts)
Tati & Elí	Tati, Jesús, Jesús	(Argentina) Tango	"El Choclo"—Ángel Villoldo	Losers
Ariel & Grecia	Erika, Ariel, Ariel	(Spain) Rumba flamenca	"Baila Me"—Gipsy Kings	Winners (2 pts)
Erika & André	Erika, Ariel, Ariel	(Spain) Rumba flamenca	"Bamboleo"—Gipsy Kings	Losers
Anahí & John	Anahí, Anahí, Belén	(Brazil) Samba	"Magalenha"—Sérgio Mendes feat. Carlinhos Brown	Winners (2 pts)
Belén & Waldir	Anahí, Anahí, Belén	(Brazil) Samba	"Jazz Machine"—Black Machine	Losers

*The duel

- Ariel & Grecia: Safe
- Tati & Elí: Eliminated (but safe with the lifeguard)

=== Week 9: Merengue House ===
The couples (except those sentenced) danced merengue house. In the versus, the couples faced dancing one unlearned ballroom dance.

Running order

Couple	Scores	Dance	Music	Result
Tati & Elí	42 (11, 11, 10, 10)	Merengue house	"Fiesta Caliente"—Ilegales	Best steps
Marisol & Jorge	37 (10, 10, 8, 9)	Merengue house	"Como un Trueno"—Ilegales	Safe
Jean Paul & Carmen	36 (9, 9, 8, 10)	Merengue house	"Dame de Eso"—Ilegales	Safe
Ariel & Grecia	33 (8, 8, 7, 10)	Disco*	"I Will Survive"—Desiré Mandrile	Sentenced
Anahí & John	38 (9, 10, 9, 10)	Adagio*	"Hey Jude"—Ádammo	—
Jesús & Lucero	37 (10, 9, 9, 9)	Merengue house	"El Tiburón"—Proyecto Uno	Safe
Erika & André	35 (9, 9, 8, 9)	Merengue house	"El Taqui Taqui"—Ilegales	Sentenced
Belén & Waldir	42 (11, 11, 10, 10)	Merengue house	"La Morena"—Ilegales	Safe

The versus
Couple	Judges' votes	Dance	Music	Result
Jesús & Lucero	Jesús, Jesús, Anahí	Jive	"Wake Me Up Before You Go-Go"—Wham!	Winners (2 pts)
Anahí & John	Jesús, Jesús, Anahí	Jive	"Crazy Little Thing Called Love"—Queen	Losers
Ariel & Grecia	Erika, Ariel, Ariel	Cha-cha-cha	"La Negra Tiene Tumbao"—Celia Cruz	Winners (2 pts)
Erika & André	Erika, Ariel, Ariel	Cha-cha-cha	"Ríe y Llora"—Celia Cruz	Losers
Jean Paul & Carmen	Jean Paul, Marisol, Jean Paul	Foxtrot	"Zip Gun Bop"—Royal Crown Revue	Winners (2 pts)
Marisol & Jorge	Jean Paul, Marisol, Jean Paul	Foxtrot	"Sparkling Diamonds"—Nicole Kidman	Losers
Tati & Elí	Tati, Belén, Tati	Rumba	"En Ausencia de Tí"—Laura Pausini	Winners (2 pts)
Belén & Waldir	Tati, Belén, Tati	Rumba	"Quédate"—Lara Fabian	Losers

*The duel

- Ariel & Grecia: Safe
- Anahí & John: Eliminated

=== Week 10: Latin Pop/Adagio Under the Rain ===
Individual judges' scores in the chart below (given in parentheses) are listed in this order from left to right: Morella Petrozzi, Abel Talamántez, Pachi Valle Riestra, VIP Jury.

The couples danced Latin pop (except those sentenced) and adagio under the rain. Maricielo Effio returned to the competition after being absent for two weeks.

Running order

Couple	Scores	Dance	Music	Result
Jean Paul & Carmen	37 (9, 9, 9, 10)	Latin pop	"Baila Baila"—Chayanne	Sentenced
Jean Paul & Carmen	33 (7, 8, 8, 10)	Adagio	"Mi Vida Eres Tú"—Carlos Mata	Sentenced
Jesús & Lucero	38 (10, 9, 9, 10)	Latin pop	"She Bangs"—Ricky Martin	Safe
Jesús & Lucero	37 (9, 9, 9, 10)	Adagio	"Abrázame Muy Fuerte"—Juan Gabriel	Safe
Maricielo & Elí	36 (10, 8, 8, 10)	Latin pop	"Baila Casanova"—Paulina Rubio	Safe
Maricielo & Elí	37 (9, 9, 9, 10)	Adagio	"Cuando Se Acaba el Amor"—Guillermo Dávila	Safe
Erika & André	38 (10, 9, 9, 10)	Cumbia*	"La Escobita"—Marisol Y La Magia del Norte	—
Erika & André	34 (8, 8, 8, 10)	Adagio	"El Privilegio de Amar"—Manuel Mijares feat. Lucero	—
Ariel & Grecia	36 (8, 9, 9, 10)	Cumbia*	"Cariñito"—Deyvis Orosco	Sentenced
Ariel & Grecia	31 (7, 8, 7, 9)	Adagio	"Víveme"—Laura Pausini	Sentenced
Belén & Waldir	41 (11, 11, 9, 10)	Latin pop	"Te aviso, Te Anuncio"—Shakira	Best steps
Belén & Waldir	37 (9, 9, 9, 10)	Adagio	"Amor en Silencio"—Marco Antonio Solis	Best steps
Marisol & Jorge	37 (9, 9, 9, 10)	Latin pop	"¿A quién le importa?"—Thalía	Safe
Marisol & Jorge	35 (8, 9, 8, 10)	Adagio	"Para Dormir Contigo"—Aranza	Safe

*The duel

- Erika & André: Eliminated
- Ariel & Grecia: Safe

=== Week 11: Quarterfinals ===
Individual judges' scores in the charts below (given in parentheses) are listed in this order from left to right: Morella Petrozzi, Carlos Alcántara, Pachi Valle Riestra, VIP Jury.

The couples danced cumbia (except those sentenced), axé under the rain and a team dance of jazz.

Running order

Couple	Scores	Dance	Music	Result
Maricielo & Elí	38 (10, 10, 9, 9)	Cumbia	"Maldito Corazón"—Ráfaga	Safe
Maricielo & Elí	40 (10, 10, 10, 10)	Axé	"Mueve la Pompa"—Axé Bahia	Safe
Jesús & Lucero	40 (11, 9, 10, 10)	Cumbia	"Mentirosa"—Ráfaga	Safe
Jesús & Lucero	39 (10, 10, 9, 10)	Axé	"Dança da Maozinha"—É o Tchan!	Safe
Belén & Waldir	43 (11, 11, 11, 10)	Cumbia	"Ráfaga de Amor"—Ráfaga	Best steps
Belén & Waldir	41 (11, 10, 10, 10)	Axé	"Dança Do Vampiro"—Axé Bahía	Best steps
Marisol & Jorge	37 (9, 9, 9, 10)	Cumbia	"La Indecorosa"—Karla	Sentenced
Marisol & Jorge	39 (10, 9, 10, 10)	Axé	"Beso en la Boca"—Axé Bahía	Sentenced
Ariel & Grecia	35 (9, 8, 8, 10)	Marinera*	"Nadie Como Tú"—Los Hermanos Ardiles	—
Ariel & Grecia	34 (8, 8, 8, 10)	Axé	"Dança Da Manivela"—Axé Bahía	—
Jean Paul & Carmen	39 (10, 10, 9, 10)	Jazz*	"Muchacho Provinciano"—Los Mojarras	Sentenciados
Jean Paul & Carmen	37 (9, 9, 10, 9)	Axé	"Ou Da Ou Desce"—Exporto Brasil	Sentenciados
Jesús & Lucero; Maricielo & Elí; Ariel & Grecia	0	Jazz (Team A)	"Girlfriend"—Avril Lavigne	
Marisol & Jorge; Belén & Waldir; Jean Paul & Carmen	2	Jazz (Team B)	"Mickey"—Toni Basil	

*The duel

- Ariel & Grecia: Eliminated
- Jean Paul & Carmen: Safe

=== Week 12: Semifinals ===
The couples danced guaracha (except those sentenced) and cha-cha-cha or paso doble. In the train, the participants faced dancing jazz.

Running order

Couple	Scores	Dance	Music	Result
Belén & Waldir	37 (10, 9, 8, 10)	Guaracha	"El Yerberito Moderno"—La Sonora Matancera feat. Celia Cruz	Safe
Belén & Waldir	42 (11, 11, 10, 10)	Cha-cha-cha	"Telephone"—Lady Gaga feat. Beyoncé	Safe
Jesús & Lucero	39 (11, 10, 8, 10)	Guaracha	"La Mamá y la Hija"—Alquimia la Sonora del XXI	Best steps
Jesús & Lucero	41 (11, 11, 9, 10)	Paso doble	"Déjà Vu"—Beyoncé feat. Jay-Z	Best steps
Maricielo & Elí	36 (9, 9, 8, 10)	Guaracha	"Burundanga"—La Sonora Matancera feat. Celia Cruz	Sentenced
Maricielo & Elí	42 (11, 11, 10, 10)	Paso doble	"Thriller"—Michael Jackson	Sentenced
Marisol & Jorge	35 (9, 9, 8, 9)	Reggaeton*	"Ella Se Arrebata"—Latin Fresh	—
Marisol & Jorge	34 (8, 9, 8, 9)	Cha-cha-cha	"Like a Prayer"—Madonna	—
Jean Paul & Carmen	38 (10, 10, 8, 10)	Reggaeton*	"Give Me Everything" / "I Know You Want Me (Calle Ocho)"—Pitbull	Sentenced
Jean Paul & Carmen	36 (9, 9, 8, 10)	Paso doble	"On the Floor—Jennifer Lopez feat. Pitbull	Sentenced

The train
Participants	Judges' votes	Dance	Music	Winners
Men	Jesús, Jesús, Jesús	Jazz	"Beat It"—Michael Jackson	Jesús (2 pts)
Women	Maricielo, Belén, Carmen	Jazz	"Ojos Así"—Shakira	Maricielo, Belén, Carmen (1 pt)

*The duel

- Marisol & Jorge: Eliminated
- Jean Paul & Carmen: Safe

=== Week 13: Finals ===
On the first part, the couples saved danced a mix (festejo/merengue/quebradita) while the couples sentenced danced marinera. Then all the couples danced a freestyle.

On the second part, the final three couples danced salsa and quickstep.

Running order (Part 1)

Couple	Scores	Dance	Music	Result
Jesús & Lucero	36 (9, 9, 8, 10)	Festejo; Merengue; Quebradita	"Le Dije a Papá"—Eva Ayllón "La Reina de la Pista"—Oro Sólido "La Quebradora"—Banda el Recodo	—
Jesús & Lucero	42 (11, 11, 10, 10)	Freestyle	"Comanche"—The Revels	—
Belén & Waldir	41 (11, 10, 10, 10)	Festejo; Merengue; Quebradita	"Ingá"—Eva Ayllón "Kikikí"—Rikanera "Vámonos de Fiesta"—Banda el Recodo	—
Belén & Waldir	37 (9, 9, 9, 10)	Freestyle	"Love the Way You Lie"—Eminem / "Bleeding Love"—Leona Lewis	—
Maricielo & Elí	39 (11, 9, 9, 10)	Marinera*	"La Concheperla"—Banda de la PNP	Safe
Maricielo & Elí	36 (8, 9, 9, 10)	Freestyle	"Holding Out for a Hero"—Bonnie Tyler	Safe
Jean Paul & Carmen	36 (8, 9, 9, 10)	Marinera*	"Saca Chispas"—Banda de la PNP	Eliminated
Jean Paul & Carmen	38 (9, 10, 10, 9)	Freestyle	"Fever"—Wisin & Yandel / "Party Rock Anthem"—LMFAO	Eliminated

Running order (Part 2)

Couple	Scores	Dance	Music	Result
Belén & Waldir	40 (10, 10, 10, 10)	Salsa	"Cachondea"—Fruko y sus Tesos	Runner up
Belén & Waldir	40 (10, 10, 10, 10)	Quickstep	"Sing, Sing, Sing (With a Swing)"—Benny Goodman	Runner up
Maricielo & Elí	41 (10, 11, 10, 10)	Salsa	"La Rebelión"—Joe Arroyo	Third place
Maricielo & Elí	41 (11, 10, 10, 10)	Quickstep	"Life Goes to a Party"—Harry James	Third place
Jesús & Lucero	43 (11, 11, 11, 10)	Salsa	"Aguanile"—Héctor Lavoe	Winners
Jesús & Lucero	42 (11, 11, 10, 10)	Quickstep	"Dancing Fool"—Barry Manilow	Winners

== Dance chart ==
The celebrities and their dreamers will dance one of these routines for each corresponding week:

- Week 1: Latin pop (Latin Pop)
- Week 2: Salsa (Salsa)
- Week 3: Disco & the danceathon (Disco)
- Week 4: Reggaeton & team dances (Reggaeton)
- Week 5: Cumbia & team dances (Cumbia)
- Week 6: Merengue & the versus (Merengue)
- Week 7: Tex-mex & the versus (Tex-Mex)
- Week 8: Trio salsa & the versus (Trio Salsa)
- Week 9: Merengue house & the versus (Merengue House)
- Week 10: Latin pop & adagio (Latin Pop/Adagio Under the Rain)
- Week 11: Cumbia, axé & team dances (Quarterfinals)
- Week 12: Guaracha, cha-cha-cha or paso doble & the train (Semifinals)
- Week 13: Mix (festejo/merengue/quebradita), freestyle, salsa & quickstep (Finals)

Couple	Week1	Week 2	Week 3	Week 4	Week 5	Week 6	Week 7	Week 8	Week 9	Week 10		Week 11		Week 12		Week 13			
Jesús & Lucero	Latin pop	Salsa	Disco	Reggaeton	Cumbia	Merengue	Tex-mex	Salsa	Merengue house	Latin pop	Adagio	Cumbia	Axé	Guaracha	Paso doble	Mix	Freestyle	Salsa	Quickstep
Belén & Waldir	Latin pop	Salsa	Disco	Reggaeton	Cumbia	Merengue	Tex-mex	Salsa	Merengue house	Latin pop	Adagio	Cumbia	Axé	Guaracha	Cha-cha-cha	Mix	Freestyle	Salsa	Quickstep
Maricielo & Elí	Latin pop	Salsa	Disco	Reggaeton	Cumbia	Merengue	Tex-mex	Jazz	Merengue house	Latin pop	Adagio	Cumbia	Axé	Guaracha	Paso doble	Marinera	Freestyle	Salsa	Quickstep
Jean Paul & Cármen	Latin pop	Salsa	Pop Latino	Reggaeton	Cumbia	Merengue	Tex-mex	Salsa	Merengue house	Latin pop	Adagio	Jazz	Axé	Reggaetón	Paso doble	Marinera	Freestyle		
Marisol & Jorge	Latin pop	Salsa	Disco	Reggaeton	Cumbia	Merengue	Tex-mex	Salsa	Merengue house	Latin pop	Adagio	Cumbia	Axé	Reggaetón	Cha-cha-cha				
Ariel & Grecia	Latin pop	Salsa	Disco	Reggaeton	Cumbia	Jazz	Festejo	Latin pop	Disco	Cumbia	Adagio	Marinera	Axé						
Erika & André	Latin pop	Salsa	Disco	Reggaeton	Jazz	Jazz	Tango	Salsa	Merengue house	Cumbia	Adagio								
Anahí & John	Latin pop	Salsa	Disco	Reggaeton	Cumbia	Merengue	Tex-mex	Salsa	Adagio										
Denny & Tiffany	Latin pop	Cumbia	Disco	Reggaeton	Salsa	Merengue	Guaracha												
Renato & Gloria	Latin pop	Merengue	Disco	Latin pop	Jazz	Latin pop													
Chatín & Roxana	Latin pop	Salsa	Latin pop	Jazz															
Maribel & Juan Manuel	Latin pop	Jazz																	

Modalities of competition
Couple	Week 3	Week 4	Week 5	Week 6	Week 7	Week 8	Week 9	Week 11	Week 12
Jesús & Lucero	Salsa	Bollywood	Hula	Jazz	Jazz	Tango	Jive	Jazz	Jazz
Belén & Waldir	Salsa	Bollywood	Hula	Jazz	Jazz	Samba	Rumba	Jazz	Jazz
Maricielo & Elí	Salsa	Bollywood	Hula	Jazz	Jazz	Tango	Rumba	Jazz	Jazz
Jean Paul & Cármen	Salsa	Bollywood	Hula	Jazz	Jazz	Rock and roll	Foxtrot	Jazz	Jazz
Marisol & Jorge	Salsa	Bollywood	Hula	Jazz	Jazz	Rock and roll	Foxtrot	Jazz	Jazz
Ariel & Grecia	Salsa	Bollywood	Hula	Jazz	Jazz	Rumba flamenca	Cha-cha-cha	Jazz	
Erika & André	Salsa	Bollywood	Hula	Jazz	Jazz	Rumba flamenca	Cha-cha-cha		
Anahí & John	Salsa	Bollywood	Hula	Jazz	Jazz	Samba	Jive		
Denny & Tiffany	Salsa	Bollywood	Hula	Jazz	Jazz				
Renato & Gloria	Salsa	Bollywood	Hula	Pop					
Chatín & Roxana	Salsa	Bollywood							
Maribel & Juan Manuel									

Highest scoring dance
Lowest scoring dance
Gained bonus points for winning this dance
Gained no bonus points for losing this dance
In italic indicate the dances performed in the duel
