= Vaguito =

- Theatrical release poster
- Directed by: Alex Hidalgo
- Written by: Rodolfo Esquivel; Alex Hidalgo
- Produced by: Oscar Rojas; Oromi León; Erick Del Águila; Alessandra Díaz; Ricardo Castillo; Guillermo Gallegos; Luis Mucha; Hugo Farro; Williams Granados
- Starring: Julián Legaspi; Fernando Arze; Fiorella Rodríguez
- Cinematography: Pino Alfieri; Antonio Rujel-Herrera
- Edited by: Alex Hidalgo
- Music by: Alex Hidalgo; Rodolfo Bustamante
- Production company: Bamboo Pictures
- Release date: April 18, 2024
- Running time: 94 minutes
- Country: Peru
- Language: Spanish

Vaguito (also known as Vaguito, te esperaré en la orilla, lit. 'Vaguito I'll wait for you on the shore') is a 2024 Peruvian drama film co-written, edited, co-scored and directed by Alex Hidalgo. Starring Julián Legaspi, Fernando Arze and Fiorella Rodríguez. It is based on a true story of a dog that was abandoned on the streets of Punta Negra, Peru and rescued by a fisherman.

== Synopsis ==
Vaguito, an abandoned dog, is rescued by Pancho, an honest leader of a fishing association. He finds himself facing a fishing mafia and his fight to deliver justice will trigger, together with the dog, a series of events that will make him the victim of betrayal on the high seas. After that tragedy, Vaguito will refuse to leave the beach and will stay to wait day after day for the friend he could not say goodbye to and who lies in the depths of the sea.

== Cast ==
- Julián Legaspi as Pancho
- Fernando Arze as Santino
- Fiorella Rodríguez as Marina
- Alexia Barnechea as Laura
- Daniela Darcourt as Lola
- Erick Del Aguila as Luis
- Alex Hidalgo as Simón
- Gina Palma as Cristel
- Américo Zuñiga as Julio

== Production ==
Principal photography began on August 1, 2023, in the Punta Negra, Peru.

== Release ==
Vaguito premiered on April 18, 2024, in Peruvian theaters, then was released on April 25, 2024, in Bolivian theaters, and on September 30, 2024, in Venezuelan theaters. It was also screened on April 24, 2024, at the Picture House Theater in Brownsville, New York.

== Reception ==
=== Box office ===
The film attracted 4,000 people on its first day in theaters, ranking seventh. After finishing its first week of exhibition, it ended up occupying third place with an audience of 100,000 viewers. By the start of its second week, it reached 171,000 viewers. On April 29, the number of attendees exceeded 277,000. By May 2, the film sold more than 630,000 movie tickets. In the middle of the same month it surpassed 900,000 viewers, becoming the most viewed Peruvian film of the year, surpassing Chabuca and Live or Dead: The García File. At the end of its run, it sold 913,846 tickets, becoming the ninth highest-grossing Peruvian film in history, surpassing Guerrero.

=== Controversy ===
Alex Hidalgo declared that part of the box office will go to supporting animal care shelters. However, this measure generated criticism for the lack of clarity about the money allocated. Some time later, the director say only 5% of the profits would go to the Vaguitos de 4patas shelter.

== Future ==
After the success of the film, Alex Hidalgo expressed his interest in making a sequel that would follow the life of Vaguito's son, proposing to title it 'Vaguito 2', 'Vaguito 2: El regreso' (lit. 'Vaguito 2: The return') or 'Vaguito: la venganza' (lit. 'Vaguito: The revenge ').
