= Luis Manuel Ávila =

Mexican actor

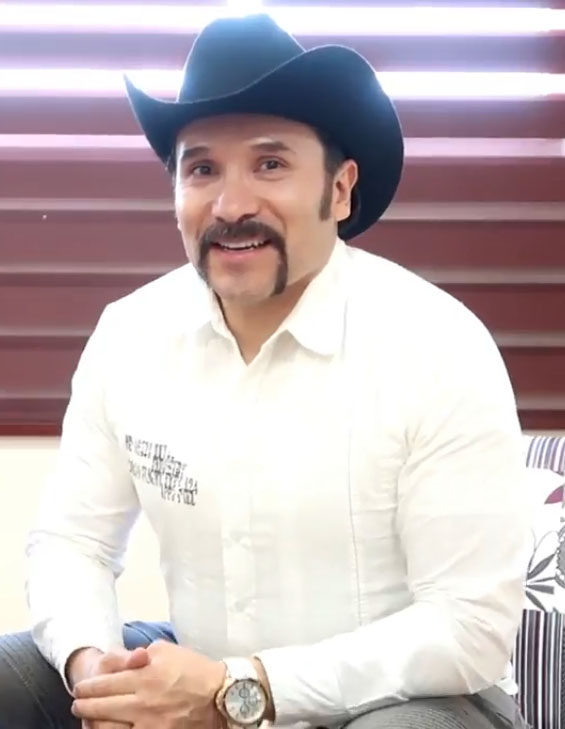
- Ávila in 2018
- Born: January 30, 1971 (age 55); Mexico City, Distrito Federal, Mexico
- Occupations: Actor; comedian; singer
- Years active: 1991–present

Luis Manuel Ávila (born January 30, 1971) is a Mexican actor and comedian who is best known for his roles of "Tomás Mora" in La fea más bella and "Junior P. Luche" in La familia P. Luche.

== Life ==
He was named best actor in the First Festival of University Theatre UNAM.

He has worked in different performing activities since 1991. Theater: "Esperando al Zurdo" "Macbeth & Co" "Romeo y Julieta" "Don Juan Tenorio" "Yo Madre Yo Hija" "Politico de Alcoba" and more, at this moment "La Caja".

Film: "Divina Confusión" El Octavo Pasajero" "Aspiración" "Debo No Niego" "En La Tierra". TV: "La Fea Más Bella" "Camaleones" "Las Tontas No Van Al Cielo" "Triunfo del Amor" "Por Ella Soy Eva" and actually "La Familia Peluche season 3".

He has a career as a comedian since 1995 with his characters Librado, Junior, Tomás and Zamora.

Lately he has focused his career into the world music with his two albums "Biografía" and actually "El Riesgo" as part of the duet LOS LUISES who are visiting throughout Mexico and various cities in USA.

== Biography ==
At the age of 18, Luis Manuel Ávila entered the UNAM (National Autonomous University of Mexico) to study Business Administration. He got his bachelor's degree. He decided to pursue an acting career despite having an excellent academic performance to the point of obtaining, together with his thesis partner, the recognition for the Best Bachelor Thesis in Administration at the National Level by ANFECA (National Association of Faculties and Schools of Accounting and Administration).

== Filmography ==
=== Telenovelas ===
- 2013: La Tempestad – Olinto
- 2012: Por Ella Soy Eva – Onésimo Garza Torres
- 2011: Triunfo del Amor – Lucciano Ferreti
- 2009: Camaleones – Eusebio Portillo
- 2008: Las Tontas No Van al Cielo – Zamora
- 2006/2007: La Fea Más Bella – Tomás Mora Gutierrez
- 2004: Misión SOS – "'Raus Raus'"

=== TV series ===
- 2012: La Familia Peluche Third Season – "Junior P.Luche"
- 2012: Como Dice el Dicho – "Nino Rosales"
- 2007: La Familia Peluche Second Season – Junior P.Luche
- 2007: Objetos Perdidos – Various Characters
- 2006: Vecinos – Albañil/Casimiro Perez
- 2003/2005 Mujer, Casos de la Vida Real – "Various Characters"
- 2002–2004: La Familia Peluche First Season – Junior P.Luche
- 2000: Furcio – "Various Characters"
- 1998/1999: Derbez en Cuando – "Various Characters"
- 1998: El Balcón de Verónica – "Various Characters"

=== Films ===
- Divina Confusión (2007) – Policía 1
- Ahí viene Verónica (1999)

=== Short films ===
- Aspiración
- Luna y Mar
- Portaequipaje
- El Octavo Pasajero
- En La Tierra
- Debo No Niego

=== Theater ===
- El Juego que Todos Jugamos
- Macbeth & Co
- Romeo y Julieta
- Tramoya
- Invitación a la Muerte
- El Gran Inquisidor
- A Tu Intocable Persona
- Así Pasa Cuando Sucede
- Don Juan Tenorio
- Bolero
- El Baúl
- Yo Madre Yo Hija
- La Pareja Dispareja
- Político de Alcoba
- La Caja

=== Musicals ===
- Aladino
- El Jorobado de Nuestra Señora de París
- Scherezada

=== Dubbing ===
- Dragon Ball Super: Super Hero - Gohan
- Saint Seiya: The Lost Canvas - Cerberus Dante
