= Yaco Eskenazi =

Peruvian actor (born 1979)

Jacobo Eskenazi Álvarez (born 14 December 1979) is a Peruvian actor and former footballer.

== Football career ==
Before going into television, Eskenazi was a professional footballer.
