= List of Peruvian submissions for the Academy Award for Best International Feature Film =

Best International Feature Film submissions from Peru

Highlights
- Debut: 1967
- Submissions: 33
- Nominations: 1
- Oscar winners: none

Peru has submitted films for the Academy Award for Best International Feature Film (Note: The category was previously named the Academy Award for Best Foreign Language Film, but this was changed to the Academy Award for Best International Feature Film in April 2019, after the Academy deemed the word "Foreign" to be outdated.) since 1967, when it became the fourth Western Hemisphere country to enter the Oscar Foreign Film race, after Mexico, Brazil and Argentina. The award is handed out annually by the United States Academy of Motion Picture Arts and Sciences to a feature-length motion picture produced outside the United States that contains primarily non-English dialogue.

As of 2026, Peru was nominated only once, for The Milk of Sorrow (2009).

== Submissions ==
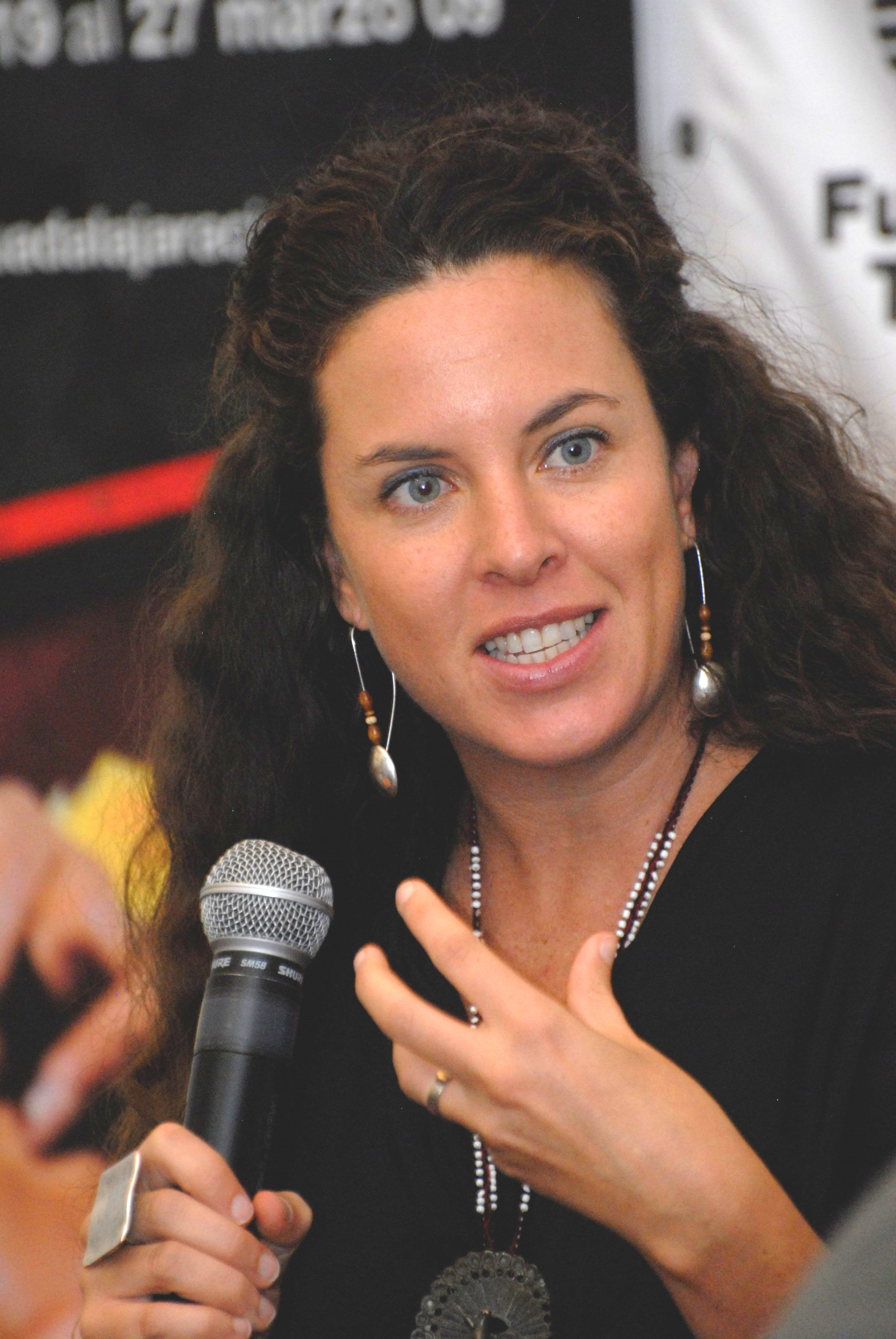
Claudia Llosa directed The Milk of Sorrow (2009), Peru's first film to be nominated.

The Academy of Motion Picture Arts and Sciences has invited the film industries of various countries to submit their best film for the Academy Award for Best International Feature Film since 1956. The International Feature Film Committee oversees the process and reviews all the submitted films. Following this, they vote via secret ballot to determine the five nominees for the award.

Francisco José Lombardi had six films selected as the country official entry, the most by any filmmaker, while Armando Robles Godoy had three films submitted. Claudia Llosa was the first female filmmaker to have a film selected, and her film The Milk of Sorrow (2009) was the country first and only nomination.

Most of the films submitted are primary in Spanish, Quechua, or Aymara. Below is a list of the films that have been submitted by Peru for review by the Academy for the award by year and the respective Academy Awards ceremony.

| Year (Ceremony) | Film title used in nomination | Original title | Language(s) | Director | Result |
|---|---|---|---|---|---|
| 1967 (40th) | No Stars in the Jungle | En la selva no hay estrellas | Spanish | Armando Robles Godoy | Not nominated |
| 1969 (42nd) | The Green Wall | La muralla verde | Spanish | Armando Robles Godoy | Not nominated |
| 1972 (45th) | Mirage | Espejismo | Spanish | Armando Robles Godoy | Not nominated |
| 1983 (56th) | Maruja in Hell | Maruja en el infierno | Spanish | Francisco José Lombardi | Not nominated |
| 1985 (58th) | The City and the Dogs | La ciudad y los perros | Spanish | Francisco José Lombardi | Not nominated |
| 1988 (61st) | The Mouth of the Wolf | La boca del lobo | Spanish, Quechua | Francisco José Lombardi | Not nominated |
| 1990 (63rd) | Fallen from Heaven | Caídos del cielo | Spanish | Francisco José Lombardi | Not nominated |
| 1991 (64th) | Alias 'La Gringa' | | Spanish | Alberto Durant | Not nominated |
| 1993 (66th) | Report on Death | Reportaje a la muerte | Spanish | Danny Gavidia | Not nominated |
| 1994 (67th) | Without Compassion | Sin compasión | Spanish | Francisco José Lombardi | Not nominated |
| 1999 (72nd) | Captain Pantoja and the Special Services | Pantaleón y las visitadoras | Spanish | Francisco José Lombardi | Not nominated |
| 2003 (76th) | Paper Dove | Paloma de papel | Spanish | Fabrizio Aguilar | Not nominated |
| 2005 (78th) | Days of Santiago | Días de Santiago | Spanish | Josué Méndez | Not nominated |
| 2006 (79th) | Madeinusa | | Spanish, Quechua | Claudia Llosa | Not nominated |
| 2007 (80th) | Crossing a Shadow | Una sombra al frente | Spanish | Augusto Tamayo | Not nominated |
| 2009 (82nd) | The Milk of Sorrow | La teta asustada | Spanish, Quechua | Claudia Llosa | Nominated |
| 2010 (83rd) | Undertow | Contracorriente | Spanish | Javier Fuentes-León | Not nominated |
| 2011 (84th) | October | Octubre | Spanish | Daniel Vega Vidal and Diego Vega Vidal | Not nominated |
| 2012 (85th) | The Bad Intentions | Las malas intenciones | Spanish | Rosario Garcia-Montero | Not nominated |
| 2013 (86th) | The Cleaner | El limpiador | Spanish | Adrián Saba | Not nominated |
| 2014 (87th) | The Gospel of the Flesh | El evangelio de la carne | Spanish | Eduardo Mendoza de Echave | Not nominated |
| 2015 (88th) | NN | NN: Sin identidad | Spanish | Héctor Gálvez | Not nominated |
| 2016 (89th) | Videophilia (and Other Viral Syndromes) | Videofilia: y otros síndromes virales | Spanish, English | Juan Daniel F. Molero | Not nominated |
| 2017 (90th) | Rosa Chumbe | | Spanish | Jonatan Relayze | Not nominated |
| 2018 (91st) | Eternity | Wiñaypacha | Aymara | Óscar Catacora | Not nominated |
| 2019 (92nd) | Retablo | | Quechua, Spanish | Alvaro Delgado-Aparicio | Not nominated |
| 2020 (93rd) | Song Without a Name | Canción sin nombre | Spanish, Quechua | Melina León | Not nominated |
| 2021 (94th) | Powerful Chief | Manco Cápac | Spanish, Quechua | Henry Vallejo | Not nominated |
| 2022 (95th) | Moon Heart | El corazón de la luna | No dialogue | Aldo Salvini | Not nominated |
| 2023 (96th) | The Erection of Toribio Bardelli | La erección de Toribio Bardelli | Spanish | Adrián Saba | Not nominated |
| 2024 (97th) | Yana-Wara | | Aymara | Óscar Catacora and Tito Catacora | Not nominated |
| 2025 (98th) | Kinra | | Quechua, Spanish | Marco Panatonic | Not nominated |
| 2026 (99th) | Night Has Come | Vino la noche | Spanish | Paolo Tizón | Pending |

== Shortlisted Films ==
Since 2011, Peru has occasionally announced a list of finalists or eligible films that varies in number over the years (from 3 to 11 films) before announcing its official Oscar nominee. The following films have been preselected by the Ministry of Culture.

| Year | Films |
|---|---|
| 2011 | The Inca, The Silly Girl, and the Son of a Thief · The Last Chanka Warrior · The Vigil |
| 2012 | El Buen Pedro · Dark Heaven · The Illusionauts · Lars and the Mystery of the Portal · Reshinn, Blood of Anaconda |
| 2014 | Guard Dog · El mudo · Trip to Timbuktu · Viejos amigos |
| 2022 | Indigenous' Slayer · The Invisible Girl · Long Distance · Operation Condor · Un romance singular · The Shape of Things to Come · Willaq Pirqa, the Cinema of My Village |
| 2023 | How to Deal With a Heartbreak · Queens Without a Crown |
| 2024 | The Four Altars · The Inheritance of Flora · Islandia · The Last Laugh · Lima Is Burning · The Most Feared Skin · Redemption · Reinaldo Cutipa · ~~Reinas~~ · Viejas amigas |
| 2025 | Ashes, the Movie · Mistura · Nanito · Quadrilateral · Zafari |

== See also ==
- List of Academy Award winners and nominees for Best International Feature Film
- List of Academy Award–winning foreign-language films
