= List of films about the internal conflict in Peru =

Below is an incomplete list of feature films, television films or television series which include events of the internal conflict in Peru. This list does not include documentaries, short films.

== 1980s ==
Year	Country	Main title (Alternative title)	Original title (Original script)	Director	Subject
1982	Cuba; Peru	The Wind of Ayahuasca	El viento del ayahuasca	Nora de Izcue	Drama, Romance.
1988	Peru; Spain	The Mouth of the Wolf	La boca del lobo	Francisco José Lombardi	Action, Drama, War. Socos massacre

== 1990s ==
Year	Country	Main title (Alternative title)	Original title (Original script)	Director	Subject
1990	France; Peru	Neither with God Nor the Devil	Ni con Dios ni con El Diablo	Nilo Pereira del Mar	Action, Drama.
1991	Peru; Spain; Cuba; United Kingdom	Alias 'La Gringa'		Alberto Durant	Action, Drama, Romance.
1993	Cuba; Peru	Report on Death	Reportaje a la muerte	Danny Gavidia	Action, Drama. El Sexto Prison mutiny
1993	Peru	You Only Live Once	La vida es una sola	Marianne Eyde	
1995	Peru	Go, Run, Fly	Anda, corre, vuela	Augusto Tamayo San Román	Drama, Romance.
1997	Peru	God takes but doesn’t forget	Dios Tarda Pero No Olvida	Palito Ortega Matute	Drama.
1998	Peru	Courage	Coraje	Alberto Durant	Drama. María Elena Moyano
1999	United States	Lima: Breaking the Silence		Menahem Golan	Crime, Drama. Japanese embassy hostage crisis

== 2000s ==
Year	Country	Main title (Alternative title)	Original title (Original script)	Director	Subject
2002	Spain; United States	The Dancer Upstairs		John Malkovich	Crime, Drama, Thriller. Based on a novel The Dancer Upstairs.
2003	Peru	Paper Dove	Paloma de papel	Fabrizio Aguilar	Drama.
2003	Peru	What the Eye Doesn't See	Ojos que no ven	Francisco José Lombardi	Crime, Thriller, Drama. Vladivideo, Government of Alberto Fujimori
2004	Peru	Days of Santiago	Días de Santiago	Josué Méndez	Drama.
2006	Spain; Peru	Black Butterfly	Mariposa negra	Francisco José Lombardi	Drama.
2008	Peru		Vidas paralelas	Rocío Lladó	Action, Drama.
2009	Spain; Peru	The Milk of Sorrow	La teta asustada	Claudia Llosa	Drama, Music.
2009	Peru		Tarata	Fabrizio Aguilar	Drama. Tarata bombing
2009	Peru; Spain; Germany		Paraíso	Héctor Gálvez	Drama.

== 2010s ==
Year	Country	Main title (Alternative title)	Original title (Original script)	Director	Subject
2010	Peru		Rehenes	Bruno Ortiz Leon	Drama. Japanese embassy hostage crisis, Operation Chavín de Huántar
2011	Peru; Argentina; Germany	The Bad Intentions	Las malas intenciones	Rosario García-Montero	Comedy, Drama.
2012	Peru	The Corner of the Innocents	El rincón de los inocentes	Palito Ortega Matute	
2013	Venezuela; Peru	Knives in the Sky	Cuchillos en el cielo	Alberto Durant	Drama, Family, War.
2014	Peru; Argentina; Spain	Magallanes		Salvador del Solar	Drama. Based on a novel La pasajera.
2014	Peru; France; Colombia; Germany	NN	NN: Sin identidad	Héctor Gálvez	Drama.
2014	Argentina; Peru	Trip to Timbuktu	Viaje a Tombuctú	Rossana Díaz Costa	Drama.
2014	Peru	Guard Dog	Perro Guardián	Bacha Caravedo; Chinón Higashionna	Drama, Thriller.
2016	Colombia; Peru	One Last Afternoon	La última tarde	Joel Calero	Drama.
2016	Peru		La Última Noticia	Alejandro Legaspi	Drama.
2017	Chile; Peru	The Last Hour	La hora final	Eduardo Mendoza de Echave	Drama, History, Thriller. Capture of Abimael Guzmán
2017	Peru	The Pink House	La casa rosada	Palito Ortega Matute	Drama.
2017	Peru	Av. Larco	Av. Larco, la película	Jorge Carmona	Comedy, Musical. Based on the play Av. Larco: el musical.
2018	United States; Mexico	Bel Canto		Paul Weitz	Drama, Music, Romance, Thriller. Based on a novel Bel Canto.
2018	Peru	Whoever that fails	Caiga quien caiga	Eduardo Guillot Meave	Thriller. Based on the book Caiga quien caiga. Vladivideo, Government of Alberto Fujimori
2019	Peru; Spain; United States; Switzerland	Song Without a Name	Canción sin nombre	Melina León	Drama.
2019	Peru; Canada		Norte	Fabrizio Aguilar	Drama.
2019	Peru	The Clash	La bronca	Vega brothers	Drama.

== 2020s ==
Year	Country	Main title (Alternative title)	Original title (Original script)	Director	Subject
2023	Peru	The Most Feared Skin	La piel más temida	Joel Calero	Drama.
2024	Peru	Tattoos in Memory	Tatuajes en la memoria	Luis Llosa	Drama. Based on the autobiography of Memorias de un soldado desconocido. Lurgio Gavilán
2025	Peru	Hearth of the Wolf	El corazón del lobo	Francisco José Lombardi	Drama, War. Based on a novel El miedo del lobo.
2025	Peru	Chavín De Huántar: The Rescue of the Century	Chavín de Huántar: el rescate del siglo	Diego de León	Action, History, Thriller. Japanese embassy hostage crisis, Operation Chavín de Huántar
2025	Peru	1982		Juan Carlos Garcia	Drama.

== Television films ==
Year	Country	Main title (Alternative title)	Original title (Original script)	Director	Subject
1996	Peru		La captura del siglo	Cusi Barrio	Drama. Capture of Abimael Guzmán
