= Cinema of Iquitos =

The cinema of Iquitos, also known as Amazonian cinema, is an important film development and one of the historic pioneering event of cinema of Peru. Due to the rubber boom and the arrival of foreigners, film interest began in the early 20th century, along with the evolution of cinema of the United States in Hollywood. Cinema in Iquitos had no established date of origin. The first film, however, was made in 1900. The first films were shown in the Casa de Fierro with an Edison machine, which reproduced the images using a carbide lamp and the constant movement of the operator. Iquitos is mentioned as a metonym of cinema in the Peruvian Amazon.

The most important pioneer of cinema in Iquitos and the Loreto Region is Antonio Wong Rengifo, also a pioneer of film art in Peru, with his most important work being Bajo el sol de Loreto. Alongside this, other filmmakers such as Werner Herzog, Armando Robles Godoy, Nora Izcue, Federico García, and Dorian Fernandez Moris prolonged the cinematic presence in the city.

== History ==
=== Origins ===
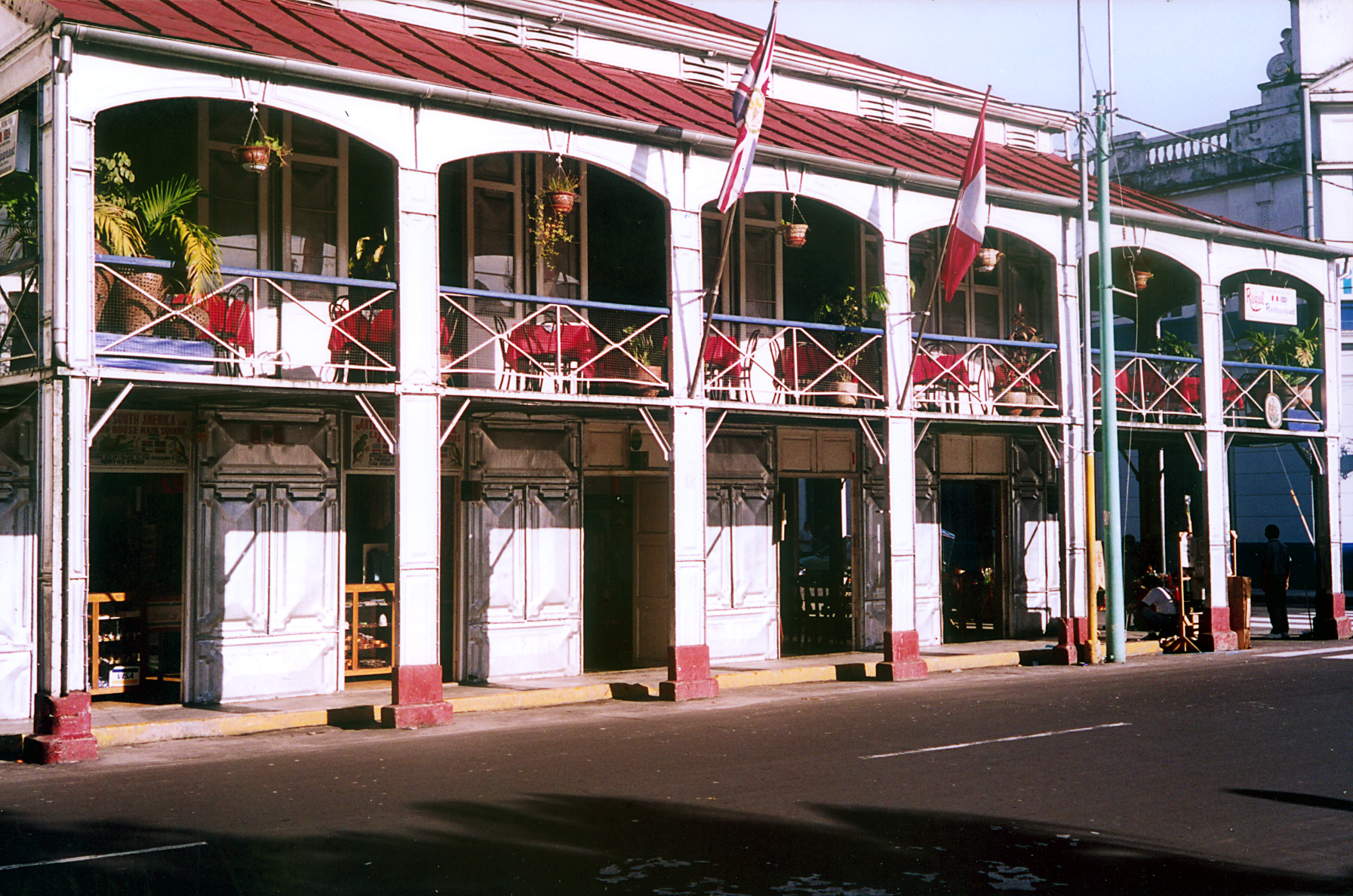
In the Iron House, the first film projection was presented with an Edison machine in 1900.

Until around the 1880, Iquitos did not have a film set. Interest in film production grew alongside the film industry booming elsewhere in the world. There is not enough accurate visual record the exact birth of cinema in Iquitos. In 1890, following the rhythm of the European organization of the city, scientific technology began arriving.

The first film made in 1900 was recorded. A movie was projected for the first time in the Iron House with an Edison machine, which reproduced the images using a carbide lamp and the constant movement of an operator. Before the fact, in 1898, Clement Alcala and Francisco de Paula Secada obtained land on the north side of the Plaza de Armas, and built a rustic-roof building, naming it Alhambra. They installed a tiny carousel brought from Manaus, Brazil. In 1902, with the rubber boom and its international impact, Edward Fuller purchased Alhambra. It hence became the first movie theater in town with Lumière brand projectors.

In the continuous city growth following the success of the rubber extraction, and its connection with Europe, the bourgeoisie grew in the city. Arnaldo Reategui traveled to France in 1905, and bought a projector with a large collection of movies—in black-and-white and technicolor—from cinema house Pathé Freres and Léon Gaumont. He was affiliated with Luis Pinasco and built a cinema called Jardín Strassburgo, located on the first block of Sargento Lores street. The first stage of Iquitos film concluded in 1914, with a prominent presence of French filmmakers. Georges Méliès and Gaumont sent several films on celluloid for the aristocratic film billboard of Iquitos. The film making attracted audiences, and blockbusters were reaching £4,500.

=== Rubber crisis and the prominence of Antonio Wong ===
Although the crisis hit Iquitos and had its effect on the industry, the arrival of new films did not stop. Films with a theatrical demeanor were gradually replaced by those more directed towards fiction. The filmmaking attracted new aspirations and acting talents, and the star system was present in the market. The distribution of Charlie Chaplin silent films were introduced by the Spanish businessman Jose Altimira.

The most important pioneer of cinema in Iquitos and the Loreto Region in general was Antonio Wong Rengifo, also a pioneer of film art in Peru. It is mainly known for shaping their ideologies, aspirations and other thoughts in his films. Wong Rengifo, in the course of his film making, followed the changing technology in the United States. In 1936, he premiered his film Bajo el sol de Loreto, a film which examines the main economic engine, and the valuation of the Peruvian Amazon (called "Selvak" in the film). He is thought to give an active representation of the amazonian culture in his films. Wong worked as a cameraman, developed his own films and edited them, and wrote his scripts inspired by Iquitos culture.

=== Developments to date ===
In October 1957, Wong started the production of a film, with Mexican actress Amalia Aguilar, to be shown at the First International Fair of Iquitos. Due to a fire, however, his film study was consumed by fire and never made it to cinemas. The same year, a group of filmmakers came from Hollywood, accompanied by Harma Lewis and Keith Larsen, to shoot 29 short films for the anthology Adventure in the Amazon, directed by Tom McGowan (a little-known, recherché filmmaker in database), and produced by Warner Bros. The series was eventually canceled due to transportation spending.

By the 1960s, film was representing the beauty and calm of the jungle, and Iquitos was home to most regional and international filmmakers. In the 1970s, the cinema of Iquitos was influenced by Decree Law Number 19327, entitled "Law for the Promotion of Film Industry." The decree facilitated the production of new films, and the presentation of the Amazon image.

The film went on to a more complex film language with themes about the richness of the jungle, the imperialist power, mining and resource processing, and use of the natives as a portrait of tourism. During these years, there were notable films such as No Stars in the Jungle (1966) and The Green Wall (1969) by Armando Robles Godoy; Aguirre, the Wrath of God (1972) and Fitzcarraldo (1982) by Werner Herzog; The Ayahuasca Wind (1983) by Nora Izcue and The Partner of God (1986) by Federico Garcia. In 1990, Iquitos was gradually used as a stage for national and international soap operas; it was the backdrop for Anaconda (1997) by Luis Llosa; Captain Pantoja and the Special Services (2000) by Francisco Lombardi; The Motorcycle Diaries by Walter Salles and Daughters of Belén (2004) by Javier Corcuera.

In 2002, publicist Dorian Fernandez-Moris founded Audiovisual Films—founded as Audiovisual—and began with a team of twenty people. He began with short films like El otro lado, Runamula and 501, and subsequently made a series of workshops to increase interest in Iquitos cinephile. In 2006, he released Chullachaqui (based on an Amazon known legend), Immortal, and the film El último piso (18 February 2010). The latter was filmed at the tallest building in the city. In 2012, Audiovisual Films produced General Cemetery in Iquitos, and is scheduled for release in October 2012.

== List of films ==
₪ - Filmed in Iquitos F - Filmed outside Iquitos T - Filmed in Iquitos and the Peruvian Amazon
Year		Title	Studio	Cast and crew	Genre	Medium	Ref.
1932		Frente del Putumayo (In Front of Putumayo)	Foto Wong	Antonio Wong Rengifo (director)	Documentary	Live action	
1933		Sepelio del Sargento Fernando Lores (Burial of Sergeant Fernando Lores)	Foto Wong	Antonio Wong Rengifo	Documentary	Live action	
1936		Bajo el sol de Loreto (Under the Sun of Loreto)	Foto Wong	Antonio Wong Rengifo (director, camarógrafo, productor, montajista y difusor)	Romance	Live action	
1941	₪	Luces y sombras de Loreto (Lights and shadows)	Foto Wong	Antonio Wong Rengifo	Documentary	Live action	
1943	₪	Inauguración del Municipio (Inauguration of the Municipality)	Foto Wong	Antonio Wong Rengifo	Documentary	Live action	
1945	T	Amazonía peruana (Peruvian Amazon)	Foto Wong	Antonio Wong Rengifo	Documentary	Live action	
1950	T	Conozca Loreto (Know Loreto Region)	Foto Wong	Antonio Wong Rengifo	Documentary	Live action	
1966	T	En la selva no hay estrellas (No Stars in the Jungle)	Antara Film del Peru / Argentina Sono Film S.A.C.I.	Armando Robles Godoy (director/scriptwriter); Jorge Aragón, Willie Griffiths, César David Miró, Jorge Montoro, Luis Otero, Susana Pardahl	Adventure	Live action	
1969	T	La muralla verde (The Green Wall)		Armando Robles Godoy	Drama	Live action	
1970	T	Machiguengas y piros		Gerhard Baer	Documentary	Live action	
1972	T	Aguirre, the Wrath of God	Werner Herzog Filmproduktion/Hessischer Rundfunk (HR)	Werner Herzog (director/scriptwriter); Thomas Mauch (cinematography); Klaus Kinski, Helena Rojo, Del Negro, Ruy Guerra, Peter Berling, Cecilia Rivera	Aventure, drama	Live action	
1974	F	Informe sobre los shipibos (Report on the Shipibo)	Inca Films	Francisco Lombardi (director/scriptwriter)	Aventure, drama	Live action	
1974	F	Los hombres del Ucayali (The Men of the Ucayali)	Inca Films	Francisco Lombardi (co-director/scriptwriter); Emilio Moscoso (co-director)	Drama	Live action	
1976	F	Aguarunas	CETUC	José Luis Rouillon A. (director); Nilo Pereira del Mar (cinematography); Guillermo Palacios P. (sound); Margarita León (narration)	Documentary	Live action	
1977	F	De los hombres y de los árboles (From the Men and the Trees)	Telecine-Ricardo Fleiss	Ricardo Fleiss (director); Gerardo Manero (cinematography); Rosalba Oxandabarat (narration)	Documentary	Live action	
1978	F	Cuentos inmorales (Inmortal Stories)	Inca Films	Francisco Lombardi (director); Emilio Moscoso (production)	Documentary	Live action	
1979	F	Una serpiente de oro (A Gold Snake)	Reátegui	Tulio Riveras (director); Emanuel Dussart (fotografía); René Andrade (narración); Hitler Mego (montajista)	Documentary	Live action	
1982	T	Fitzcarraldo	Werner Herzog Filmproduktion / Wildlife Films Peru	Werner Herzog (director/scriptwriter); Thomas Mauch (cinematography); Klaus Kinski, Claudia Cardinale, José Lewgoy, Miguel Ángel Fuentes, Paul Hittscher, Huerequeque Enrique Bohórquez	Drama, adventure	Live action	
1983	₪	El viento del ayahuasca (The Ayahuasca Wind)	Kinoks Filmaciones S.R.L. / Instituto Cubano del Arte y la Industria Cinematográfica.	Dora de Izcue (director); Jorge Vignaíi (co-cinematography); Gianfranco Annichini (co-cinematography); Justo Vega (film edition)	Thriller, drama	Live action	
1985	₪	Radio Belén	CRONOS	Gianfranco Annichini (director)	Documentary	Live action	
1985	₪	El hombre solo (The Lonely Man)	CRONOS	Gianfranco Annichini (director)	Documentary	Live action	
1986	₪	El socio de Dios (The God Partner)	Cinematográfica Kuntur S.A.	Federico García (director/co-scriptwriter); Roger Rumrill (co-scriptwriter); Juan Márquez (film editor)	Documentary	Live action	
1999	₪	Pantaleón y las visitadoras (Captain Pantoja and the Special Services)	América Producciones / Inca Films / Tornasol Films	Francisco Lombardi (director); Bingen Mendizábal (music); Enrique Moncloa (co-scriptwriter); Giovanna Pollarolo (co-guionista); Mario Vargas Llosa (novel); Salvador del Solar, Angie Cepeda, Mónica Sánchez, Pilar Bardem, Gianfranco Brero, Gustavo Bueno	Comedy, drama	Live action	
2003	F	Buscando el azul (Looking for the Blue)	Teleandes	Fernando Valdivia (director)	Drama	Live action	
2006	T	Chullachaqui	Audiovisual Films	Dorián Fernández-Moris (director); Nelson Mori (scriptwriter); Miguel Gonzáles, Ângela Vargas, Marco Vargas, Frescia Ortega, Cristian Calampa, Fernando Méndez, Gabriela Monsalve	Supernatural horror	Live action	
2008	₪	Amazónico soy (Amazonian I am)		José María Salcedo (director); Abraham Padilla (music); Carlos García (film editor)	Documentary drama	Live action	
2008	₪	Los árboles tienen madre (Trees Have a Mother)			Drama	Live action	
2009	₪	Mi hermano María Paula (My brother María Paula)		Piero Solari (director)	Drama	Live action	
2010	₪	El último piso (The Top Floor)	Audiovisual Films	Dorian Fernández-Moris (director); Francisco Bardales (scriptwriter); Duller Vásquez, Glady Vásquez, Joel Huamán.	Drama	Live action	
2012	₪	Cementerio general (General Cemetery)	Audiovisual Films	Dorian Fernández-Moris (director); Javier Velasquez (scriptwriter); Airam Galliani, Marisol Aguirre, Flavia Trujillo, Leslie Shaw, Nikko Ponce, Diva Rivera, Jürgen Gómez	Supernatural horror, found footage	Live action	
