= Cinema of Peru =

- No. of screens: 625 (2017)
  - Per capita: 1.8 per 100,000 (2017)
- Main distributors: Tondero Films (49.1%); Big Bang Films (12.7%); La Soga Producciones (10.1%)

Number of admissions (2017)
- Total: 51,785,998
- National films: 4,791,197 (9%)

Gross box office (2017)
- Total: PEN 567 million
- National films: PEN 49.4 million (8.7%)

While the Peruvian film industry has not been nearly as prolific as that of some other Latin American countries, such as Mexico or Argentina, some Peruvian movies produced enjoyed regional success. Historically, the cinema of Peru began in Iquitos in 1932 by Antonio Wong Rengifo (with a momentous, initial film billboard from 1900) because of the rubber boom and the intense arrival of foreigners with technology to the city, and thus continued an extensive, unique filmography, with a different style than the films made in the capital, Lima.

In Lima, the first Peruvian sound film (with synchronized music and some talking sequences) was Alberto Santana's Resaca, which was released in 1934. This was followed by another sound film entitled Cosas de la vida in 1934. The first all-talking picture, Buscando Olvido, was finally released in 1936.

More recently some bestselling novels by Peruvian author and talk show host Jaime Bayly, including No se lo Digas a Nadie and La Mujer de mi Hermano, have been made into movies. In fact, Francisco Jose Lombardi, perhaps the most important Peruvian filmmaker of recent years, has made most of his films from adaptations of important Peruvian novels. Peru also produced the first animated 3-D film in Latin America, Piratas en el Callao. This film is set in the historical port city of Callao, which during colonial times had to defend itself against attacks by Dutch and British privateers seeking to undercut Spain's trade with its colonies. The film was produced by the Peruvian company Alpamayo Entertainment, which made a second 3-D film one year later: Dragones: Destino de Fuego.

In February 2006, the film Madeinusa, produced as a joint venture between Peru and Spain and directed by Claudia Llosa, was set in an imaginary Andean village and describes the stagnating life of Madeinusa performed by Magaly Solier and the traumas of post-civil war Peru.

Claudia Llosa, who shared elements of Gabriel García Márquez's magic realism, won an award at the Rotterdam Film Festival. Llosa's second feature, The Milk of Sorrow ("La Teta Asustada"), was nominated for the 82nd Academy Awards for Best Foreign Language Picture, the first Peruvian film in the academy's history to be nominated and, won the Golden Bear award at the 2009 Berlinale.

On April 11, 2013, The film ¡Asu Mare! premiered nationwide. This film is an adaptation of a stand-up comedy starring Carlos Alcántara Vilar. The film is actually an autobiography, in which Carlos Alcantara tells his life story and how he became the actor he is today. The film was written and produced by Carlos Alcantara and was a huge box-office hit. Since the release, the actor has gained a lot of popularity. The film is a testament that the comedy genre can strike the right chord in the Peruvian film audience.

The Peruvian film industry has witnessed unprecedented development during the late 2010s. In 2015 the number of cinema tickets sold in Peru was 46 million in comparison to Argentina's 52.1 million. Peru's television industry has also witnessed a comeback from the 1990s as indicative of the first half of 2016. Subscriptions to Peru cable company Movistar TV represented the third highest increase in Latin America, following that of Mexico and Brazil. According to PWC's Global Media Outlook 2019-2023 report, Peruvian total box office was $181 million that is expected to grow to $242 million by 2023. Despite, Peru being one of the smallest Latin American markets the number of screens increased to 661 in 2018 and would amount to 789 by 2023. In terms of Latin America in general, production levels are rising in the countries of Peru, Mexico, Colombia, Brazil and Argentina with the region expected to raise revenue from $2.4 billion in 2018 to $3.2 billion by 2023 with an annual growth rate of 5.7%.

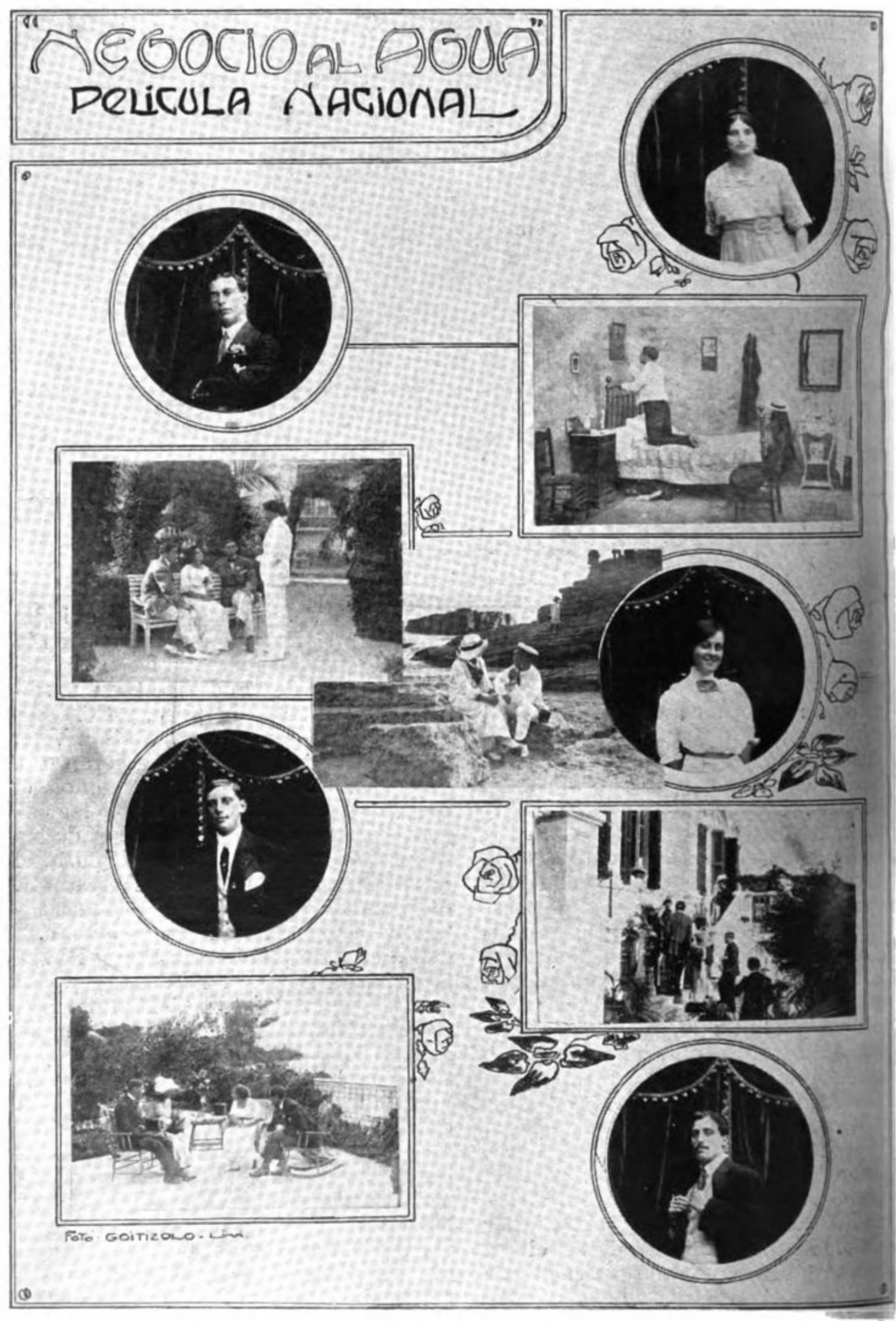
Negocio al Agua (1913) The first Peruvian film of fiction and satire. Films thereafter such as Del Manicomo Al Matrimonio (1913) in the silent period were known for its ritualized, hyper-expressive, melodramatic acting.

2018 has been a record year for the box office of Peruvian cinema ever since the highs in 2013. Attendance amounted to a record seven million viewers. For the first time, Peruvian films were released monthly and all the films in the top ten national premieres managed to accumulate six-digit figures in their respective box office. The three main distributors in Peru are Tondero Films (49.1%), Big Bang Film (12.7%) and La Soga Producciones (10.1%).

== History ==
=== Background (1897-1918) - Silent Period ===
The first performance of a film (using the cinematograph of the Lumière brothers) was performed in February 1897, at the Confiteria Jardin Strasbourg (now Club de la Unión), in Lima, Peru. A month earlier, moving images had been projected with the apparatus called Vitascope invented by Thomas Alva Edison.

The early 1900s witnessed a reconstruction of society during the rule of Nicolas De Piérola. As a civic leader in Peruvian history, Piérola emphasized the growth of state activity that also included the cinema industry. The audience who witnessed at first, the screenings of the Vitascope and the Cinematographer were from the aristocracy and the images they observed were from landscapes of other countries such as Eiffel Tower or the Champs-Elysées. Gradually, street exhibitors who purchased the motion picture film cameras took the first images of Peru during 1899. These were the first images of Peruvian geography projected by a cinematographic camera that included places such as the road to La Oroya at Chanchamayo or the Cathedral Basilica of Lima. Thereafter an age of documentary film making started as cameramen traveled to Peru, the Pacific Ocean, the Andes, and the Amazon regions to record landscapes, ceremonies, feasts, rites, public works as a means of visual identification. In 1904 businessman Juan José Pont, after a tour of different South American countries, was encouraged to record with the cinematograph different places of Lima.

The cinematographic experience from 1909 to 1912 was noted for its journalism. News documentary genre was popular through Jorge Enrique Goitizolo segments about bulls, military ceremonies, races and the carnival. Fernando Lund's Compañía Internacional Cinematográfica (Cinematographic Company) delighted the audience about journeys from southern Peru, Bolivia, regattas and hydroelectric facilities in Chosica. The documentaries also featured political events such as the general strike in Lima, the last combat of the government troops with the revolutionaries of Don Orestes Ferro and the combat at the Chira River. The pioneers of these times set the first stage for short films industry in Peru whose initial length was about ten minutes. The first Peruvian shorts originated under the documentary genre within the genre of informative journalism.

The Cinema Theater Company (Empresa del Cinema Teatro) was founded in 1915 in Lima. Together with the opening of the famous show center Teatro Colón in Lima in 1914 a new film audience was started. The first Peruvian film of fiction named Negocio al Agua (Water Business) released in the theater on 14 April 1913 based on Comedia en 5 Partes (Comedy in 5 Parts) produced by Cinema Teatro. The script was written by acclaimed poet and satirical writer Federico Blume and Corbacho. The film had a duration of about 10 minutes qualifying it as Peru's first comedy short film. On 18 June 1913, the second tragicomedy film of Peru released called Del Manicomio Al Matrimonio (1913 Film) (From Asylum to Marriage) in direct response to Negocia al Agua The film consisted of six parts and was estimated to last about 11 minutes. The film was directed by María Isabel Sánchez-Concha, Peru's first female director. Negocia al Agua's promotional activities were organized by women and it depicted family relationships.

=== 1919-1930 - Leguía Era ===
The decade of the Twenties witnessed a revival in the cinema industry marked by documentary news and cinematographic footage of galas, carnivals, banquets, horse races etc. The decade was marked by the prosperous regime of Augusto B. Leguía whose imposition of the modernization movement called the Oncenio (Patria Nueva) created new areas of occupation such as reporters and writers. The government used the camera to display the celebratory and prosperous times of Peru although the film industry was noted for its discontinuity ever since the 26 July 1922 release of Camino de la Venganza, noted as the first Peruvian national feature film. It was a drama filmed by the photographer and painter Luis Ugarte and starred Teresita Arce. Guillermo Garland Higginson as a talented cameraman popularized documentary travelogues such as Viaje a Cusco y Chanchamayo (1929) that featured sweeping panorama's of Cusco, Koricancha, Sacsayhuamán, Ollantaytambo and Machu Picchu. The restoration efforts of negatives by Archi, have made it possible to verify the existence of the travelogues.

A significant film was Luis Pardo created by Enrique Cornejo Villanueva in 1927 which also starred Teresita Arce. The film was shot in the manner of the Douglas Fairbanks tapes. The 1928 release of La Perricholi by Enzo Longhi was released with great fanfare and demonstrated Peruvian film potential. The film was noted for its clothing, richness in details, composition and sets in Rospigliosi Castle and the Quinta de Presa mansion in Rímac. The film was screened at the Seville Exhibition of 1928.

The 1930 film El Carnaval Del Amor by Pedro Sambarino was the first juxtaposition film between the city and the countryside. Sambarino who came back from Bolivia directing the country's first film called Corazón Aymara wanted to hire a script writer well known in Peru. Peru's first reporter Ángela Ramos was noted for her cinematographic and short stories. Sambarino hired Ramos for the script that highlighted the juxtaposition of a city carnival and the countryside's Pachamanca Peruvian Harvest Feast. The film was well received by the public through reviews in journals.

However, the Peruvian film industry was still in name only in the early 1930s. The endeavor to create the industry in stone was undertaken by talented directors from local and foreign countries whose goal was to establish continuity with production companies. Peruvian film directors Ricardo Villarán and Ricardo Garland were directing films in Argentina and US respectively. Polish actress, Stefanía Socha released a film called Los Abismosde la Vida in 1929. The script belonged to journalist and poet Julio Alfonso Hernández. As one of Peru's first overseas woman pioneers in film making who arrived in Peru in 1926, Socha created an acting academy for cinema called "Peru Film."

Chilean director Alberto Santana was the most noticeable of the group whose entrepreneurial spirit set the first steps in creating a Peruvian film industry. Santana's company Patria Films premiered films in the genres of comedy and melodrama during the silent period such as Como Chaplin (1929), Las Chicas Del Jirón de la Unión (1930), and the melodrama classic Yo Perdí Mi Corazón en Lima (1933). However the film industry did not materialize until the 1940s. The stage for cinema bought acclaimed actors to publicity such as Teresita Arce and Mario Musseto.

Teresita Arce became the first popular Peruvian actress. Arce was noted for her creative arts in a bourgeois theatre company. Luis Ugarte's Camino de la Venganza featured Teresita Arce as the main role of Juanacha, a young native woman who must defend against the exploitation of the miner McDonald. Arce also acted as the bride of the bandit Luis Pardo in the film of the same name. Teresita Arce's career spans to the 1960s that featured her performing in theater and radio dramas.

The 1930s was marked by turbulent political and economic events. The rise of the Arequipa Revolution by Luis Miguel Sánchez Cerro as well as the reduction in purchasing power of the middle class due to a global financial downturn of 1929 severely deterred the rise of the film industry in Peru. Peruvian film making was known for its ritualized, hyper-expressive, melodramatic content. Peruvian cinema also contrasted with the cinemas of other Latin American countries that were known for their nationalism, avant-garde, indigenous themes. Peruvian directors focused on a flat and direct cinema, conceived to move feelings and arrive without complications for the public. Additionally, the film mentality of Peru markedly contrasted with its peers as the arrival of sound in 1927 greatly affected the melodramatic silent cinema market in Peru. In comparison to this great anachronism, Luis Pardo, one of the most popular tapes of Peruvian cinema, was released in October 1927, the same year as Alan Crosland's sound film The Jazz Singer. As a result, the sound period created a crisis in the silent era period.

La Lunareja (The Moon) 1946 by Bernardo Roca Rey. Features the cast of Matilde Urrutia (seated right) next to Antonio Flores Estrada, Bernardo Roca Rey (left), María Rivera. Located in the film Library of Lima. Based on an episode of the war for the emancipation of the Spanish crown.

=== 1934-1950 - Sound Period ===
The first time sound would be incorporated in a Peruvian film will be Alberto Santana's Resaca released in July 1934. Director Sigifredo Salas heralded a new era in sound films by first releasing the optical sound film Buscando Olvido in 1936 and then a series of fourteen long-running plot films between 1937 and 1940 produced by the company Amauta Films that was founded in 1937. Amauta talkies were known for their populist comedies and dramas set within the framework of the middle class or in the suburbs. This initiative became the first steps in promoting the initial ingredients of a film such as popular voice, speech and songs. They were also known to capture and imprint the Peruvian culture into cinema with narratives that address themes of the suffering of the people who endured to survive in the midst of marginal living conditions. Amauta Films' popular works were the trilogy release of Gallo de mi Galpón, El Guapo del Pueblo and Palomillas del Rímac directed by Sigifredo Salas. Peruvian literature flourished in this time written by notable authors such as Felipe Pardo y Aliaga and Manuel Ascencio Segura whose works were used by Amauta Films.

By 1940, eleven million people made up the Peruvian audience and according to information gathered by Ricardo Bedoya, film critic and academic at the University of Lima, the number of theaters increased to 242. Amauta Films, became the noteworthy production company in this decade whose mission was to capture and imprint the Peruvian culture into cinema.

The early 1940s witnessed the same events as the early 1930s. The years were beset by shortage of photographic supplies caused by World War II. The nascent Peruvian film industry innovated by going into the sound industry. However, the directors were still innovating in the field and later found itself again in anachronistic competition with Mexican cinema called the "espectaculares" that is said to have captured the public imagination of Latin America during the 1940s. Therefore, few films released during the 1940s. A notable few included La Lunareja (The Moon) by Bernardo Roca Rey about an episode of the war for the emancipation of the Spanish crown. The film was based on a screenplay by Ricardo Palma and wardrobe design by Mocha Graña. The film was an attempt at reviving the film industry of Peru.

In July 1944, a law by President Manuel Prado was signed to promote the production of national weekly news and documentaries that would be shown in cinemas across Peru. The state by means of fixed prices set up a news industry served within the cinema halls. Production companies shifted their attention from the field of fiction to Peruvian documentary. From 1944 to 1948, approximately five production studios, including Nacional Film and production company Huascarán filmed about three hundred and fifty documentary and news programs that gave new insight to the different regions of Peru.

=== 1950-1960 - The School of Cuzco ===
The film industry in Peru revived in the 1950s as local as well as foreign directors came to Peru appraising its exotic locations such as the sierra and the jungle. Hollywood directors found Peru to be a new frontier as directors such as Sol Lesser and Edward Movius created B-series adventure films such as Paramount's Tarzan and Cold War movie (Sabotaje en Laselva) Sabotage in the Forest (1952). Out of all the films that found the locales and low production cost of Peru appealing was the Italian movie L'Imperio del Sole (The Empire of the Sun) by Enrico Grass. Additionally with Mario Craveri's movies, the cinemas captured the global imagination about the legendary life of Peru. Peru became the "country of gold" as the films showed the culture of Peru such as indigenous people wearing traditional Andean apparel like the pollera who lived in the mountains of Machu Picchu.

In terms of local production, the industry found common ground again in 1955 when the cinema club El Foto Cine-Club Cuzco (The Photo Cine-Club of Cuzco) was founded in Cuzco, the former capital of the Inca Empire. The institution served as a training base for filmmakers who wanted to film the diverse Andean world. Nicknamed Escuela del Cuzco (School of Cuzco) by historian Georges Sadoul, the institution developed the talents of acclaimed directors. A new wave of film directors from Victor and Manuel Chambi, Luis Figueroa and Eulogio Nishiyama led the way in publishing Andean cinema in the Quechua language. The club members were dedicated to maintaining cinematographic activity in the interior of the country and their short documentaries reflected the density of the indigenous populations, their social gestures and the variation of color of the landscape. The debut began on 27 December 1955 with the projection of the film The Children of Paradise by Marcel Carné, shown at the Colón cinema in that city. After this film, Manuel Chambi and Luis Figueroa toured the streets of Cusco, recording the pre-Inca, Inca, and colonial constructions that are intermingled in the buildings of the imperial city. The result of this experience was the short Las Piedras (The Stones) released in 1956. From then on the Chambi brothers would host a variety of short film documentaries during the 1950s of the Cusco region that included Carnaval de Kanas (1956), Corrida de Toros y Condors (1957), Machu Picchu (1962) and De la Recolección a la Agricultura (1974).

The club's most noteworthy and ambitious film was Kukuli (1961), directed by Eulogio Nishiyama, Luis Figueroa and César Villanueva. The movie entered into the 2nd Moscow International Film Festival. Constructed around an Andean mythological story about the fight of a man against the ukuku ice bear for the love of a maiden, the film contained native poetry and landscapes. Although the club disbanded in 1966, their filmography deeply entrenched the Cuscan experience of Andean universe, the indigenous world and the peasants to the Peruvian film industry. The initiative was the first attempt at converting reality to culturally authentic cinematography.

Cholo (1972 Film)

In 1958, the first commercial broadcast of a television program in the country took place. The medium heralded new areas in the film industry such as animators, models, soap opera actors and voice actors. The 1960s saw the publication of the Hablemosde magazine that refreshed the Peruvian film industry that was previously following the model of Mexican production. The decade bought new filmmakers to the industry such as Francisco Lombardi, José Carlos Huayhuaca, Augusto Tamayo San Román and Nelson García. Armando Robles Godoy became an acclaimed director during these times whose films entered into international film festivals. The director gave the Peruvian cinema a stable legal framework. From the drectorial debut Ganarás el Pan to No Stars in the Jungle (1966), La Muralla Verde (The Green Wall) (1970), Espejismo (Mirage) (1973), these films became landmarks in world cinema. The short film industry, that once served as the backbone of Peruvian film industry waned and did not flourish for the first time. In 1968, Sociedad Peruana de Cinematografía (Peruvian Society of Cinematography) was formed for the promotion of cinema. Its managers were: Armando Robles Godoy, Manuel Chambi, Isaac Leon Frias, Jorge Volkert, Miguel Reynel and Luis Figueroa Yábar.

=== 1970 - Peruvian Film Nationalism ===
The 1970s witnessed the proliferation of Peruvian cinemas with over 1,200 short films and 60 feature films. The government by General Juan Velasco Alvarado enacted the Ley de Promoción a la Industria Cinematográfica (Law for the Promotion of the Film Industry) (Law # 19327). The law levied cinema taxes as well as promoted the exhibition of Peruvian films. The rule was in favor by government members Franklin Urteaga and rear admiral of the Ministry of Industries Alberto Jiménez de Lucio. The state waived the tax levied on film tickets as a bid to boost domestic production. An additional requirement of the law was mandatory display of Peruvian production that reflected the message that all of Peruvians would find in common with such as the solidarity with the revolution (Peruvian War of Independence). Arturo Sinclair's Agua Salada (1974), one of the first fiction shorts made in Peru was released after the law was passed that depicted a mystical theme combining images and music. The short films during this time period would be based on tourism, documentaries about figurines or Peruvian archaeology, festivals, and landscapes in the sierra.

The new cinema law was in force for twenty years that paved the way for a renaissance in the cinema industry. The era was known for "the decade of the short boom" as short films became popular again. 300 theaters in that time had to comply with the production of short film industry. Short films of twenty minutes duration were released making the industry a lucrative business for many companies. The Alvarado government additionally kept high tariffs on the dollar as foreign entry films would be seen as a competitive disadvantage to the burgeoning Peruvian film industry of the 1970s.

The acclaimed Cholo was released that starred football player Hugo Sotil. The film marked the rise of the multicultural Lima society. A new film audience was established that reached over a million viewers for films. Notable Peruvian releases in this decade included The City and the Dogs by Lombardi, Gregorio by Grupo Chaski and arguably the most popular Peruvian film in the 20th century, La Fuga del Chacal (The Escape of The Jackal) directed by Augusto Tamayo.

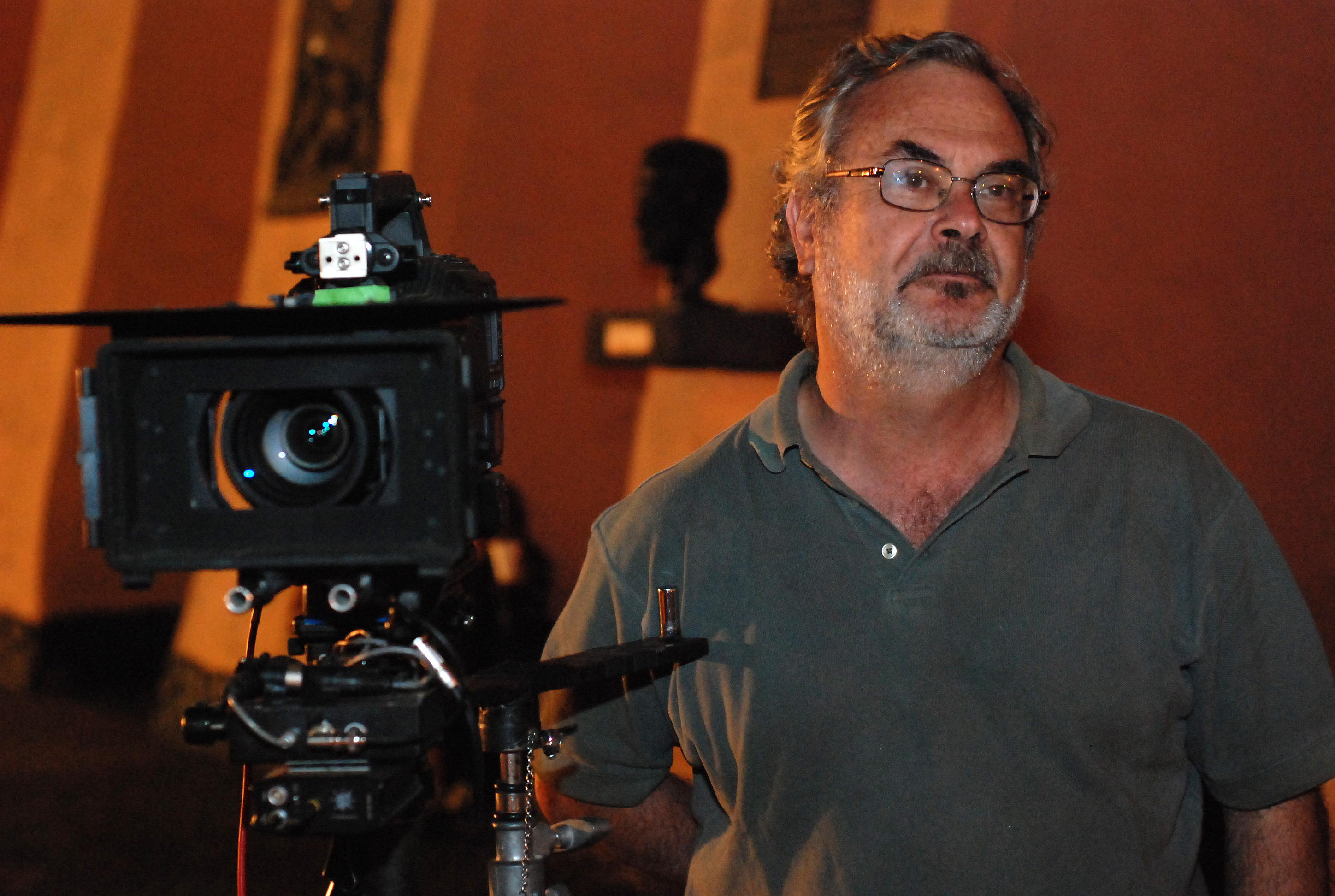
Writer, director, screenwriter and film television producer Augusto Tamayo San Román

In 1980 the ruling by Fernando Belaúnde, reversed the decision of the earlier government to restrict access to cinema as films of all nations were allowed to be displayed in Peru. In the 80s, in terms of the short film industry, stories started to represent the themes of fiction centered around urban areas. However, an excessive production without quality found the industry not lucrative for companies. Some short filmmakers still continued to draw attention to their attractive, novel and original creations. José Antonio Portugal short films Crónica de dos Mundos (1979) and Hombres de Vento (1984) as well as Juan Carlos Huayhuaca's El Enigma de la Pantalla y El Último Show were well known. By the start of the 1991 El Festival de Cortometraje (Short Film Festival), many thought the short film industry was in its final stages because of the lack of interest. However, a few notables stood out in the festival such as Rosa Maria Alvarez Gil's Luna de Almendra, Edgardo Guerra's Para Vivir Mañana, Enrique Verástegui and Aldo Salvini's El Gran Viaje del Capitán Neptuno (Great Voyage of Captain Neptuno) that would give new hope to the Peruvian cinema.

Grupo Chaski production company became a noted cultural association that started in 1985. With their 16mm projector a catalog of 25 Peruvian films were made that highlighted Peruvian lifestyle like migrations. With their network group (Red de Microcines), broadcast of films was accessible to the people in the remote areas of Peru.

=== 1990s ===
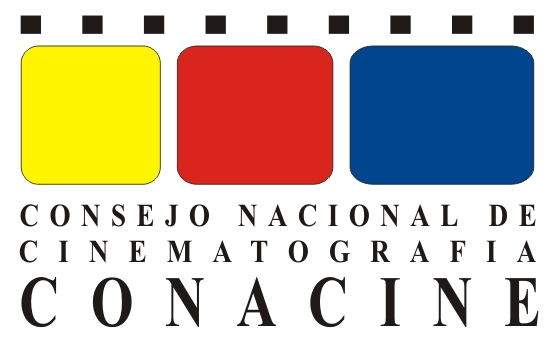
Logotype of the National Council of Peruvian Cinematography (CONACINE).

In the 1990s, under president Alberto Fujimori's government, a revolutionary new film bill would be enacted that would replace the former one. In mid-1994 a new film bill was drafted that would provide financial fund for the production of films. However, the president exercised the right to move the bill back to Congress, due to disapproval of the bill. In October 1994, Congress enacted the final Peruvian Film Law # 26370. Its rules are a combination of the 70s Peruvian nationalism regulation with the 80s decade of universal access to films. The originality of this law rests on the recognition of cinema as a "cultural and communication fact." Thereby, the state has the objective to promote the national films through a decentralized, autonomous body of the film industry called CONACINE (Consejo Nacional de Cinematografía Peruana) (National Council of Peruvian Cinematography).

The association would implement Peru's first promotional state awards festival with six feature-length projects and 48 short films recognized annually. The film festival system was strengthened with the law as a jury of specialists will award and merit those films that promote the values of Peru. However unexpected urban attacks to Peru reduced cinematographic enthusiasm in the 1900s. Despite setbacks, the spirit of the film industry was still intact, as the short film industry felt compelled by the new film law to direct new films. As a result, the CONACINE festival saw 29 short films in November 1996, 20 shorts in February 1997, 27 in August 1998 and 36 in September 1998.

On the 28th of December 1995, marking the centenary of the first feature film made by the Lumière brothers; the government designated three representatives to the National Council of Cinematography: CONACINE, National Institute of Culture and National Institute of Defense of Competition and Protection of Intellectual Property (Indecopi). They were committed to work for key values such as to promote national production and to preserve audiovisual heritage. From 1996, CONCAINE was awarded by President Alberto Fujimori in the Congress of Andean filmmakers of Cusco a disbursement of 500,000 soles, equivalent to S/991,137 in 2017, as the guild's first budget. However, by the year 1999, the budget did not break even as the guild found itself under debt from economic pressure of the time period.

=== 2000s - Present ===
Today, Peruvian cinema adapts the rich history and culture of the Andean tradition, Amazonian mythology and legends and brings them to the cinema halls. From 1997 to 2015, 206 films have been produced that not only reflects the rich traditions of Peru but also serves as a medium to portray the suffering and consequences of the internal conflict in Peru. The rise of such an industry that portrays the culture of Peru amidst its history has given the movement the name "regional cinema of Peru." In 2011, the National Council of Cinematography came to an end as the 1990s Film Law finished its last term. In 2018 Peru passed a minor film bill that gave more incentive towards the fifty five indigenous communities of the country. By late 2019 the new Peruvian Film Law # 022-2019 was passed as an emergency decree by the Ministry of Culture. The bill would take effect after 2020 setting up a decentralized authority in charge of economic stimulus, film education and promotion of films. Miguel Valladares, manager of Tondero Films says the bill will allow viewers to "discover a new Peruvian cinema."

Peruvian films in recent years are being sought out for their comedy, biographical, musical genres. Peru the country itself is ideal for location scouting for directors from within and abroad. The large number of life zones make Peru an ideal destination for audiovisual production. Critically acclaimed films in the 2000s include Jonatan Relayze directed Rosa Chumbe, Daniel and Diego Vega Vidal's October that won the award in Vladivostok International Festival for the performance by Carlos Gassols as well as Andes Mountains classic Eternity (Wiñaypacha).

The Peruvian Image and Sound Archive (ARCHI) has been the primary force in preserving Peru's audiovisual history dating back to the 1900s. Founded in 1991, Archi still preserves the history of Peruvian cinema by digitizing exclusive archives that would otherwise would have been sold abroad. They are currently undertaking a project with the National Library of Peru to create a state film archive.

== Animation ==
Peruvian animation industry is known for its record release of the first South American CGI animated film. In Latin America in general, there has been renewed interest in animation ever since the late 2010s. Ventana Sur's Animation! and Mexico's Pixelatl festivals have inaugurated the creative potential of animators to an international level. Financial backing is the only factor that holds back the Latin American animation industry such as those in Peru.

The Peruvian animation industry is among the most dynamic among the Latin American countries whose products include Condorito: La Película released in 2017 and Amazon rain forest mythology animation Ainbo: Spirit of the Amazon released in 2021. Latin American animators are known to present the indigenous local stories with universal themes that can strike the right chord for both domestic as well as international audiences. Milton Guerrero, president of the Peru Animation Guild, says the guild have seen a rise in companies that include over twelve companies with an average of 200 workers. Revenues reach $10 million per year, with significant growth rates projected for 2019. However the challenges facing the industry is exporting of their turnover to producers in other countries and lack of staff. The guild has started initiatives to broaden the benefits of this industry with projects such as in-house training internships and development programs for animators.

Animation in Peru accurately portray the Andean mythology and Tahuantinsuyo era. The directors inspired from their own history and background have developed such features as children's animated television series Punolo, Aventuras de Altura, animated series Kawsayninchikpaq (meaning "for our life") that features the septuagenarian Andean worldview protagonists Surimana and Uturunku and Incan animated feature Kayara. The second Peruvian-Spanish Animation co-production meeting was held in 2021.

== See also ==
- List of Peruvian films
- Elcine
- Lima Film Festival
- Inkafest
- National and International Short Film Festival of Cuzco Peru
- Latin American cinema
- Peruvian cinema legislation

== Literature ==
- 100 años de cine en el Perú: Una historia crítica (Spanish Edition) by Ricardo Bedoya ISBN 978-8489358461
- Carbone, Giancarlo. El cine en el Perú: 1897–1950. Testimonios. Lima: Universidad de Lima, 1991
- Carbone, Giancarlo. El cine en el Perú: 1950–1972. Testimonios. Lima: Universidad de Lima, 1993 ISBN 9789972453120
