= Aristóteles Picho =

- Born: Aristóteles Picho Martínez; 8 March 1957; Huancayo, Junín Region, Peru
- Died: 21 December 2013 (aged 56); Lima, Lima Province, Peru
- Education: Escuela Nacional Superior de Arte Dramático
- Occupations: Actor; director; writer; acting teacher
- Years active: 1983–2013

Aristóteles Picho Martínez (8 March 1957 – 21 December 2013) was a Peruvian actor, director, writer and acting teacher.

Born in Huancayo, Junín Region, Picho studied at the Escuela Nacional Superior de Arte Dramático and began his career in 1983. Picho also taught playwriting at the Pontifical Catholic University of Peru and the University of Lima.

Aristóteles Picho died of heart attack on 21 December 2013, aged 56, in Lima, Lima Province.

== Filmography ==
| Year | Title | Role | Notes |
|---|---|---|---|
| 1985 | The City and the Dogs | The Snake / Boa | |
| 1988 | The Mouth of the Wolf | El Chino | |
| 1991 | Alias 'La Gringa' | | |
| 1993 | Report on Death | Supay | |
| 1993 | La vida es una sola | | |
| 1994 | Todos somos estrellas | Actor on TV set | |
| 1999 | Captain Pantoja and the Special Services | El Sinchi | |
| 1999 | Coraje | García | |
| 2000 | Proof of Life | Sandro | |
| 2001 | Lost Bullet | Charlie | |
| 2003 | A Martian Named Desire | | |
| 2003 | Paper Dove | Fermin | |
| 2009 | El premio | Carpenter | |
| 2013 | The Gospel of the Flesh | | (final film role) |
