= Lost Bullet =

Lost Bullet may refer to:

- Lost Bullet (2001 film), a Peruvian surrealist crime drama film
- Lost Bullet (2020 film), a French action thriller film
- Lost Bullet (novel), a British mystery novel
