= Aurore Avarguès-Weber =

French neuroscientist (born 1983)

- Born: 1983 (age 42–43); Givry, Saône-et-Loire, France
- Education: Université Toulouse III - Paul Sabatier
- Children: 2
- Awards: L'Oréal-UNESCO For Women in Science Awards (2015); CNRS Médaille de Bronze (2019)
- Scientific career
- Fields: Cognitive neuroscience; Ethology
- Workplaces: Centre de recherche sur la cognition animale (Toulouse); Queen Mary University of London
- Thesis: [ Cognition visuelle chez l'abeille Apis mellifera: Catégorisation par extraction de configurations spatiales et de concepts relationnels] (2010)
- Doctoral advisor: Martin Giurfa
- Other academic advisors: Lars Chittka; Jean-Christophe Sandoz

Aurore Avarguès-Weber (born 1983) is a French cognitive neuroscientist and ethologist who is researching the behaviour of bees at the Centre de Recherche sur la Cognition Animale in Toulouse.

In 2015, for investigating the brain mechanisms of visual cognition of social insects, she received an International Rising Talent Fellowship, one of the L'Oréal-UNESCO Awards for Women in Science. She has also received a CNRS Bronze Medal.

== Early life ==
Avarguès-Weber is from Givry, in France. After graduating high school in Chalon-sur-Saône, she chose to study in a Classe Préparatoire in Lyon, and developed a passion for biology and physiology.

== Education and research ==
Avarguès-Weber studied at the Ecole Normale Superieure de Cachan. She then researched her PhD in the lab of Martin Giurfa at the Research Centre for Animal Cognition (Centre de Recherches sur la Cognition Animale, CRCA) in Toulouse, defending her thesis in 2010. She then undertook two post-doctoral research positions, one under Lars Chittka at Queen Mary University, and one with Jean-Christophe Sandoz in Gif-sur-Yvette.

She currently works in the CRCA's EXPerience-dependent PLAsticity in INsects (EXPLAIN) team. Though she initially wanted to study orangutans, Avarguès-Weber has focused on bees since 2007. The results of her research have implications for both computer science and facial recognition. Amongst other things, her lab has shown that bees are capable of numerical cognition and mathematical abstraction: they can add and subtract, and they recognise the concept of zero. She has also shown that bees can recognise face-like patterns. She is currently developing a virtual reality system to test more complex abilities of bees.

== Awards and achievements ==
Averguès-Weber has received an International Rising Talent Fellowship, and was awarded the L'Oréal-UNESCO Awards for Women in Science in 2015, along with prize money of 20,000 euros. In 2019, she received the Bronze Medal from the CNRS, the French national centre for scientific research. The Bronze Medal recognises the first works of researchers; Averguès-Weber was recognised for her work on the cognition of bees.

== Selected publications ==
- Configural processing enables discrimination and categorization of face-like stimuli in honeybees (2009) Journal of Experimental Biology.
- Aversive Reinforcement Improves Visual Discrimination Learning in Free-Flying Honeybees (2010) PLOS ONE
- Simultaneous mastering of two abstract concepts by the miniature brain of bees (2012) Proceedings of the National Academy of Sciences.
- The forest or the trees: preference for global over local image processing is reversed by prior experience in honeybees (2014) Proceedings of the Royal Society B: Biological Sciences
- Recognition of Human Face Images by the Free Flying Wasp Vespula vulgaris (2017) Animal Behavior and Cognition
- Bumblebee social learning can lead to suboptimal foraging choices (2018) Animal Behaviour. 135: 209–214.
- Does Holistic Processing Require a Large Brain? Insights From Honeybees and Wasps in Fine Visual Recognition Tasks (2018) Frontiers in Psychology
- Aminergic neuromodulation of associative visual learning in harnessed honey bees (2018) Neurobiology of Learning and Memory. 155: 556–567.
- Numerical cognition in honeybees enables addition and subtraction (2019) Science Advances

She has also written articles about her research for the general public for the magazine Pour la Science.

== Personal life ==
Avarguès-Weber has four children.
