= The Erection of Toribio Bardelli =

2023 film by Adrián Saba

- Theatrical release poster
- Directed by: Adrián Saba
- Written by: Adrián Saba
- Produced by: Carolina Denegri
- Starring: Gustavo Bueno
- Cinematography: Christian Valera
- Edited by: Justin Beach; Maksim T. Kuzin
- Music by: Hugo Huanqui
- Production companies: Flamingo Films; Animalita; 3 Moinhos
- Distributed by: V&R Films
- Release dates: 15 August 2023 (Lima); 26 October 2023 (Peru)
- Running time: 82 minutes
- Countries: Peru; Brazil
- Language: Spanish

The Erection of Toribio Bardelli (Spanish: La erección de Toribio Bardelli) is a 2023 black tragicomedy film written and directed by Adrián Saba. An international co-production between Peru and Brazil, the film stars Gustavo Bueno, with Gisela Ponce de León, Rodrigo Sánchez Patiño, Michele Abascal and Lucélia Santos. The film was selected as the Peruvian entry for the Best International Feature Film at the 96th Academy Awards, but it was not nominated

== Synopsis ==
Toribio Bardelli is an older man, who together with his four children, now adults, form a dysfunctional and failed family. About to turn 70, Toribio will pursue his only goal in life: to have an erection again.

== Cast ==
- Gustavo Bueno as Toribio Bardelli
- Gisela Ponce de León as Sara Bardelli
- Rodrigo Sánchez Patiño as Silvestre Bardelli
- Lucélia Santos as Celestine
- Michele Abascal as Luz Bardelli
- Coco Chiarella as Elderly Friend
- Lizet Chavez as Malaga
- Beto Benites as Ruben
- Liliana Albornoz as Prostitute
- Milena Alva as Pharmacist
- Rodrigo Palacios as Luz's Co-Worker
- Víctor Prada

== Production ==
=== Financing ===
At the end of July 2015, the film received an economic stimulus of 550,000 soles from the Directorate of Audiovisual, Phonography and New Media delivered by the Ministry of Culture of Peru to start its development phase. On 20 November 2018, it received an economic boost from Ibermedia and a short time it received 4,000 euros after winning the Best Pitch award at the 4th Ventana del Cine Madrileño to start production.

=== Filming ===
Principal photography lasted 5 weeks in Lima District, Surco, Miraflores and Barranco, Peru in 2019.

== Release ==
The Erection of Toribio Bardelli had its world premiere on 15 August 2023 as part of the Fiction competition at the 27th Lima Film Festival. It competed in the Progressive Cinema Competition – Visions for the World of Tomorrow section at the Rome Film Festival 2023 in October. It was released theatrically in Peru on 26 October 2023.

== Reception ==
=== Critical reception ===
Eddson Esquives from La Cinestación rated the film 6 out of 10, noting that "it's a story that loses strength as it progresses," expressing that supporting characters didn't contribute significantly to the protagonist's development, and indicating the shallow approach to addressing the grief the family is going through, although he highlights the acting capacity of Gustavo Bueno, Gisela Ponce de León and Rodrigo Sánchez.

Sandro Mairata of La República, mentioned that the film should not have been selected for its competition within the framework of the 27th Lima Film Festival, pointing out technical errors, poor direction of actors, and a script that seems not to be fully developed.

In August 2023, the Ministry of Culture of Peru selected The Erection of Toribio Bardelli in their shortlist for their submission to the 96th Academy Awards for Best International Feature Film alongside Queens Without a Crown and How to Deal With a Heartbreak. The Erection of Toribio Bardelli ultimately was the official submission for the category.

=== Accolades ===
Year	Award / Festival	Category	Recipient	Result	Ref.
2023	27th Lima Film Festival	Best Picture	The Erection of Toribio Bardelli	Nominated	
2023	18th Rome Film Festival	Best Film	The Erection of Toribio Bardelli	Nominated	
2024	19th Luces Awards	Best Film	The Erection of Toribio Bardelli	Nominated	
2024	19th Luces Awards	Best Actor	Gustavo Bueno	Won	
2024	19th Luces Awards	Best Actor	Rodrigo Sánchez Patiño	Nominated	
2024	15th APRECI Awards	Best Supporting Actress	Michele Abascal	Nominated	

== See also ==
- List of submissions to the 96th Academy Awards for Best International Feature Film
- List of Peruvian submissions for the Academy Award for Best International Feature Film
