= The Mouth of the Wolf =

The Mouth of the Wolf can refer to:

- The Mouth of the Wolf (1988 film), a 1988 Peruvian film
- The Mouth of the Wolf (2009 film), a 2009 Italian film
