= General Cemetery (disambiguation) =

General Cemetery may refer to:

Cemeteries

- Sheffield General Cemetery, UK
- Boroondara General Cemetery, Australia
- Ipswich General Cemetery, UK
- Hull General Cemetery, UK
- Melbourne General Cemetery, Australia

Other

- General Cemetery (Cementerio General in Spanish) a Peruvian supernatural horror film directed by Dorian Fernandez Moris.
