= The Cleaner (2012 film) =

2012 Peruvian drama film

- Promotional release poster
- Directed by: Adrián Saba
- Written by: Adrián Saba
- Starring: Adrian du Bois
- Cinematography: César Fe
- Music by: Karin Zielinski
- Release dates: 24 September 2012 (Zinemaldia); 21 March 2013 (Peru)
- Running time: 95 minutes
- Country: Peru
- Language: Spanish

The Cleaner (Spanish: El limpiador) is a 2012 Peruvian dystopian drama film written and directed by Adrián Saba. The film was selected as the Peruvian entry for the Best Foreign Language Film at the 86th Academy Awards, but it was not nominated.

== Cast ==
- Adrian du Bois as Joaquin
- Víctor Prada as Eusebio

== See also ==
- List of submissions to the 86th Academy Awards for Best Foreign Language Film
- List of Peruvian submissions for the Academy Award for Best Foreign Language Film
