= List of submissions to the 40th Academy Awards for Best Foreign Language Film =

1967 Best Foreign Language Film submissions

Highlights
- Oscar winner: (Czechoslovakia) Closely Watched Trains
- Submissions: 16
- Debuts: 2

This is a list of submissions to the 40th Academy Awards for Best Foreign Language Film. The Academy Award for Best Foreign Language Film was created in 1956 by the Academy of Motion Picture Arts and Sciences to honour non-English-speaking films produced outside the United States. The award is handed out annually, and is accepted by the winning film's director, although it is considered an award for the submitting country as a whole. Countries are invited by the Academy to submit their best films for competition according to strict rules, with only one film being accepted from each country.

For the 40th Academy Awards, sixteen films were submitted in the category Academy Award for Best Foreign Language Film. Belgium and Peru submitted films to the competition for the first time. The five nominated films came from France, Japan, Spain, Yugoslavia and the Czechoslovakia.

Czechoslovakia won for the second time with Closely Watched Trains by Jiří Menzel.

== Submissions ==
Submitting country	Film title used in nomination	Original title	Language(s)	Director(s)	Result
Belgium	Le départ		French	Jerzy Skolimowski	Not nominated
Brazil	Case of the Naves Brothers	O Caso dos Irmãos Naves	Brazilian Portuguese	Luis Sérgio Person	Not nominated
Czechoslovakia	Closely Watched Trains	Ostře sledované vlaky	Czech, German	Jiří Menzel	Won Academy Award
Denmark	Once There Was a War	Der var engang en krig	Danish	Palle Kjærulff-Schmidt	Not nominated
France	Live for Life	Vivre pour Vivre	French	Claude Lelouch	Nominated
West Germany	Tattoo	Tätowierung	German	Johannes Schaaf	Not nominated
Hungary	Father	Apa	Hungarian	István Szabó	Not nominated
India	The Last Letter	आख़िरी खत	Hindi	Chetan Anand	Not nominated
Italy	China Is Near	La Cina è vicina	Italian	Marco Bellocchio	Not nominated
Japan	Portrait of Chieko	智恵子抄	Japanese	Noboru Nakamura	Nominated
Mexico	The Adolescents	Los adolescentes	Spanish	Abel Salazar	Not nominated
Peru	No Stars in the Jungle	En la selva no hay estrellas	Spanish	Armando Robles Godoy	Not nominated
Philippines	Because of a Flower	Dahil sa isang bulaklak	Tagalog	Luis Nepomuceno	Not nominated
Spain	El Amor Brujo		Spanish	Francisco Rovira Beleta	Nominated
Sweden	Here's Your Life	Här har du ditt liv	Swedish	Jan Troell	Not nominated
Yugoslavia	I Even Met Happy Gypsies	Skupljaci perja	Romani, Serbo-Croatian	Aleksandar Petrović	Nominated

== Sources ==
- Margaret Herrick Library, Academy of Motion Picture Arts and Sciences
