= The Dreamer (2016 film) =

- Theatrical release poster
- Directed by: Adrián Saba
- Written by: Adrián Saba
- Produced by: Carolina Denegri; Adrián Saba
- Starring: Gustavo Borjas
- Cinematography: César Fe
- Edited by: Justin Beach
- Music by: Nuria Saba
- Production companies: Animalita; Flamingo Films; Insolence Productions
- Release dates: February 16, 2016 (Berlinale); January 26, 2017 (Peru)
- Running time: 80 minutes
- Countries: Peru; France
- Language: Spanish

The Dreamer (Spanish: El soñador) is a 2016 romantic drama film written, co-produced and directed by Adrián Saba. Starring Gustavo Borjas as a young gang member who longs to escape his criminal environment while developing his first love, in a plot that plays between the real and the dreamlike.

The Dreamer had its world premiere at the 66th Berlin International Film Festival on 16 February 2016, in the Generation 14plus section.

== Synopsis ==
Sebastian has a talent: opening locks. That seems to be the only reason why he is part of a gang that robs industrial buildings and warehouses in Lima. His life is complicated, but Sebastián manages to survive by escaping into a world of dreams. One day, Emilia, the sister of the band's leaders, appears in this world and Sebastián will find it difficult to distinguish between reality and dreams.

== Cast ==
- Gustavo Borjas as Sebastian "Chaplin"
- Elisa Tenaud as Emilia
- Herbert Corimanya as Samuel
- Valentín Prado as Yara
- Eugenio Vidal as Jaén
- Manuel Gold as Teta
- Tatiana Espinoza as Mom
- Adrién Du Bois as El Niño
- Luis Kanashiro as El Chino
- Milena Alva as Orphanage Director
- Américo Zuñiga as Orphanage Caretaker
- Lucho Sandeval as Police 1
- Virachandra Williams as Police 2
- Bárbara Falconi as Hotel Reception

== Production ==
Adrián Saba began writing the script for the film in 2013, taking up all of that year and part of the next. Principal photography lasted 5 weeks in Lima, Callao, Ica, Junín, Arequipa and in the snowy mountains of Ticlio.

== Release ==
The Dreamer had its world premiere on February 16, 2016, at the 66th Berlin International Film Festival, then screened on August 7, 2016, at the 20th Lima Film Festival. Its commercial premiere was scheduled for September 1, 2016, in Peruvian theaters, but was delayed and released on January 26, 2017.

== Accolades ==
Year	Award / Festival	Category	Recipient	Result	Ref.
2016	66th Berlin International Film Festival	Youth Jury Generation 14plus - Best Film	The Dreamer	Nominated	
2016	20th Lima Film Festival	Best Picture	The Dreamer	Nominated	
2016	20th Lima Film Festival	International Critics' Jury Award - Special Mention	The Dreamer	Won	
2016	20th Lima Film Festival	Ministry of Culture Jury Prize	The Dreamer	Won	
2016	52nd Chicago International Film Festival	Gold Hugo - New Directors Competition	The Dreamer	Nominated	
