= Alexian Kernel =

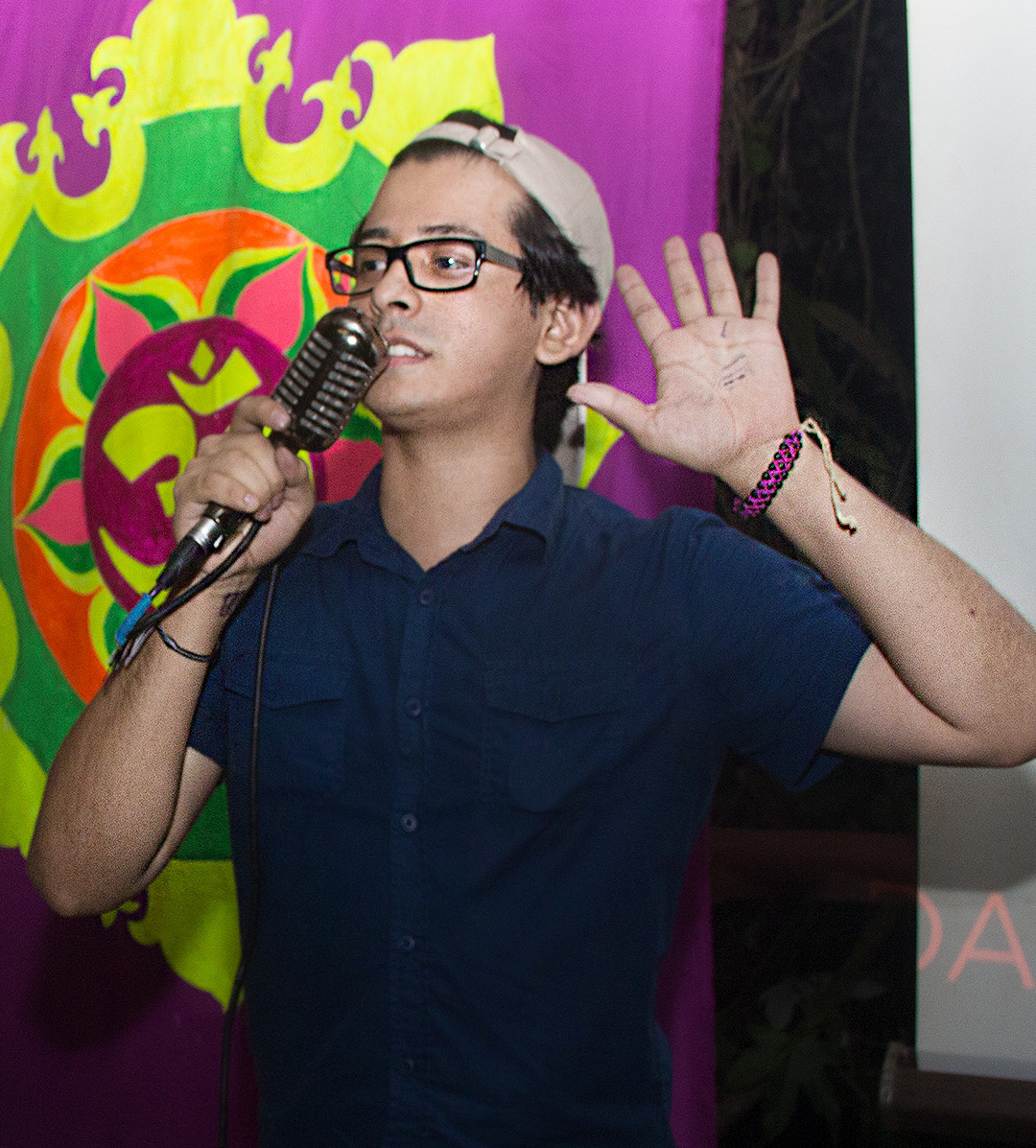
- Born: Percy Alexander Meza Bravo; April 18, 1992 (age 34); Iquitos, Loreto Region, Peru
- Education: Scientific University of Peru
- Occupations: Musician, visual artist, filmmaker
- Years active: 2011 – present
- Known for: Cementerio General (2013)
- Musical career
- Genres: Electronic; Electro house
- Labels: Frenchdak Records, Independent
- Website: alexiankernel.com

Percy Alexander Meza Bravo (born April 18, 1992), also known by his stage name Alexian Kernel, is a Peruvian electronic musician, film editor and visual artist. Born and raised in the City of Iquitos, he has been selected since 2013 as one of the 20 most influential online people in that city, and the first artist of the Peruvian Amazon of the 21st century available on major digital music platforms such as Spotify and iTunes.

== Life and music career ==
=== 1992-2010: Beginnings ===
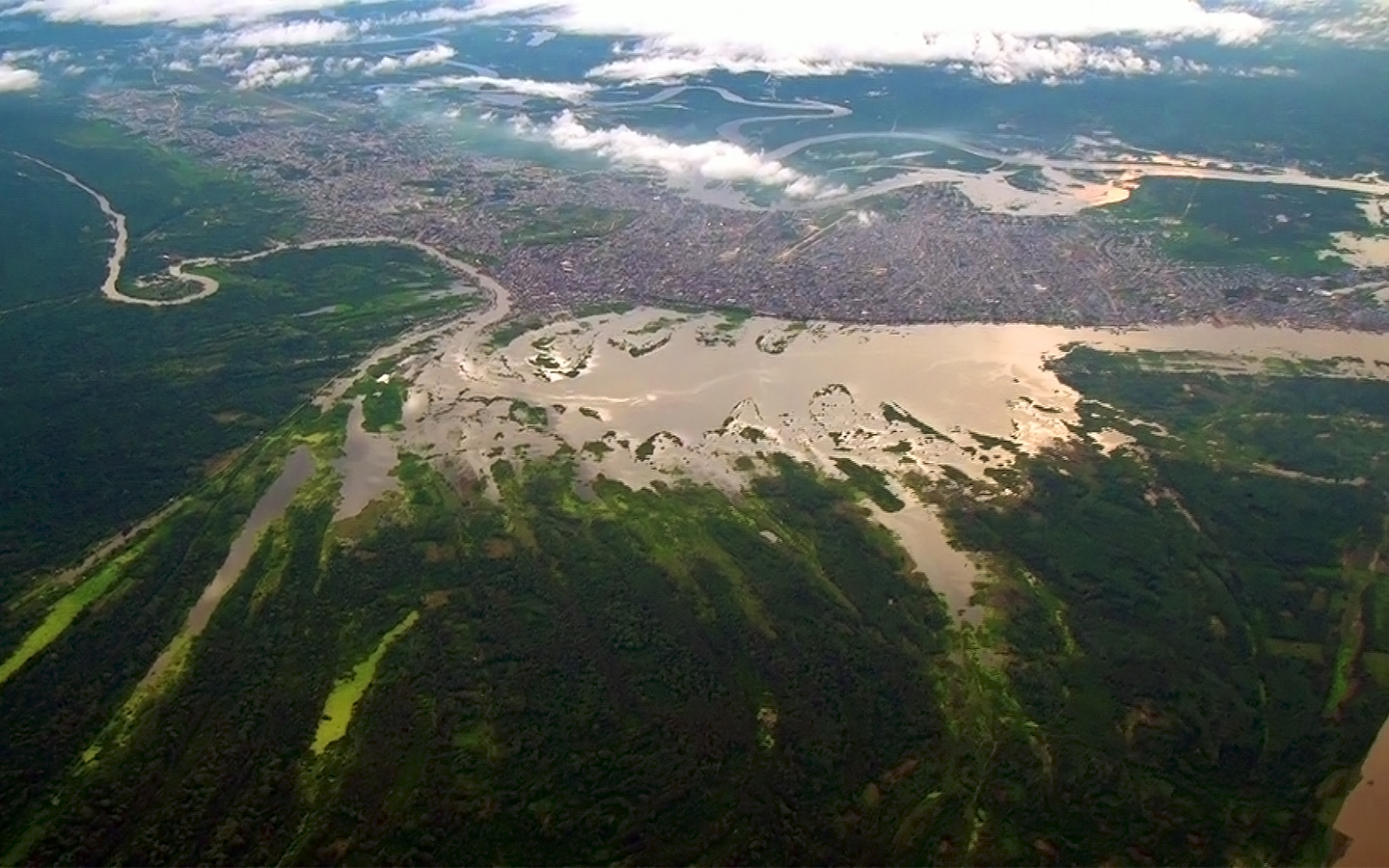
Alexian Kernel born in the important Amazonian city Iquitos.

Percy Alexander Meza Bravo was born on April 18, 1992, in Iquitos, Peru. He attended Scientific University of Peru where he graduated with a Bachelor of Communication Sciences.

Before entering the music, Kernel had a brief beginning in Literature, writing stories and novels of science fiction, horror and fantasy; all were published as e-books.

In 2010, Kernel became interested in music when a friend showed him FL Studio, a digital audio workstation. Motivated and inspired by artists like Mr. Oizo, The Chemical Brothers, Calvin Harris, Björk and Crystal Castles also The Prodigy and Kraftwerk, he began composing ambient/experimental-oriented tracks. Originally, he was known as Percy Meza before adopting the new alias. In 2012, he adopted the alias Alexian Kernel, created from his middle name "Alexander" and the German word kernel, which means nucleus. The decision of this movement was due to the intention to separate his "earthly personality" from music, which is more colorful and versatile.

=== 2014-present: Official entry to Spotify and iTunes ===
After the implementation of broadband in Iquitos on March 18, 2014, which brought about a great cultural revival in the city, Kernel entered the music industry by streaming with the release of "A-OK" and "Hey Young Charapa "on iTunes and Spotify. This made him the first young artist to enter large music platforms in a region that was virtually "hopeless" and affected by the lack of connectivity.

Directed by Paco Bardales, Kernel produced the music video for "Downtown Iquitos", included as a two-chapter short-film in 2014. In early 2016, he released another single titled "Smooth Ready".

On March 21, 2017, Kernel digitally launches "Do It Right," which it considers to be its "most pop release" to date. The song was programmed to belong to a large studio album, but was separated to release it as a virtual single, with two bonus songs: "Big-City Crush" and "Smooth Ready (Instrumental Mix)". To date, the song "Do It Right" has won more than 3,000 streams on Spotify, mainly featuring Los Angeles listeners.

== Film and graphic design career ==
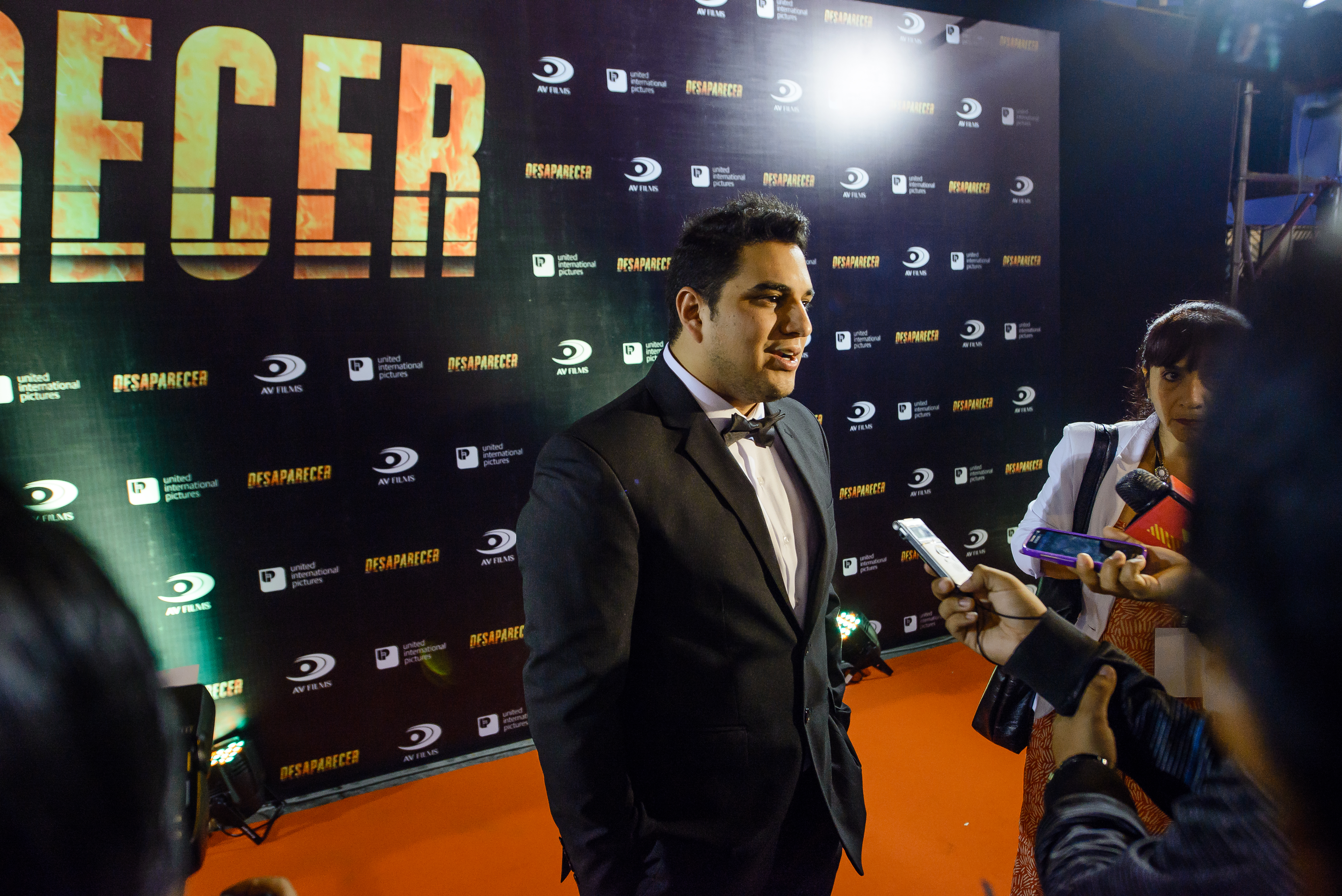
Kernel participated with the well-known Peruvian filmmaker Dorian Fernández-Moris (in image) in General Cemetery y Maligno.

Outside his musical alias, Meza is very dedicated to film scene as film editor, visual artist and writer. He worked as offline editor in very popular Peruvian film Cementerio general directed by Dorian Fernández-Moris, which was the highest -grossing film in Peru in 2013. After participating as screenwriter and actor in college-short film Ciudadanos Astrales in 2014, he returned to work for Dorian Fernández-Moris for Maligno in 2016 as graphic designer and digital artist.

After participating as a scriptwriter in a short film Citizens Astrales in 2014, he returned to work with Fernández-Moris for Maligno in 2016 as graphic designer of the official poster and digital artist. The design team of the official poster was composed by Alexian Kernel in graphic design, Enrique Pezo in photography and Fernández-Moris as creative producer. The art work featured one of the corridors of the Regional Hospital of Iquitos, with actress Fiorella Pennano impersonating the film's antagonist.

Kernel designed the graphic material for Netflix from the films General Cemetery and Secreto Matusita (internationally titled as The Secret of Evil), available from the end of January on the streaming platform.

== Discography ==
| Year | Title | Tracks | Notes |
|---|---|---|---|
| 2014 | Instant Freedom | "A-OK" | Single |
| 2014 | Instant Freedom | "Hey Joven Charapa" | Single |
| 2016 | Smooth Ready | "Smooth Ready" | Single |
| 2016 | Resplandor (Original Book Soundtrack) | "The Urban Gang" | EP |
| 2016 | Resplandor (Original Book Soundtrack) | "The Storm" | EP |
| 2016 | Resplandor (Original Book Soundtrack) | "Big Bang" | EP |
| 2016 | Ciudadanos Astrales: Banda Sonora Original | "El Retorno de Marcus" | Studio album |
| 2016 | Ciudadanos Astrales: Banda Sonora Original | "Bajo la campana" | Studio album |
| 2016 | Ciudadanos Astrales: Banda Sonora Original | "Ojos pesados" | Studio album |
| 2016 | Ciudadanos Astrales: Banda Sonora Original | "Primicia" | Studio album |
| 2016 | Ciudadanos Astrales: Banda Sonora Original | "Sesiones" | Studio album |
| 2016 | Ciudadanos Astrales: Banda Sonora Original | "Santo Tomás" | Studio album |
| 2016 | My Pocket Iquitos | "Intro" | Studio album |
| 2016 | My Pocket Iquitos | "Amazon Rave" | Studio album |
| 2016 | My Pocket Iquitos | "Motocarro Guru" | Studio album |
| 2016 | My Pocket Iquitos | "The Friends" | Studio album |
| 2016 | My Pocket Iquitos | "We Build the Maze" | Studio album |
| 2016 | My Pocket Iquitos | "Hormiga Brava" | Studio album |
| 2016 | My Pocket Iquitos | "Downtown Iquitos"* | Studio album |
| 2017 | Do It Right | "Do It Right" | Single |
| 2017 | Do It Right | "Big-City Crush" | Single |
| 2017 | Do It Right | "Smooth Ready" (Instrumental Mix) | Single |

=== Other tracks ===
- "The Friends" (2012)
- "Fast River" (2012)
- "Big Bang" (2013)
- "La Pandilla Urbana" (2013)
- "La tormenta" (2013)
- "Downtown Iquitos" (2014)

== Filmography ==
- General Cemetery (2013)
- Ciudadanos Astrales como Harold (2014)
- El Pétalo de los 33 (2014)
- Maligno (2016)
