= Teresita Arce =

Peruvian actress

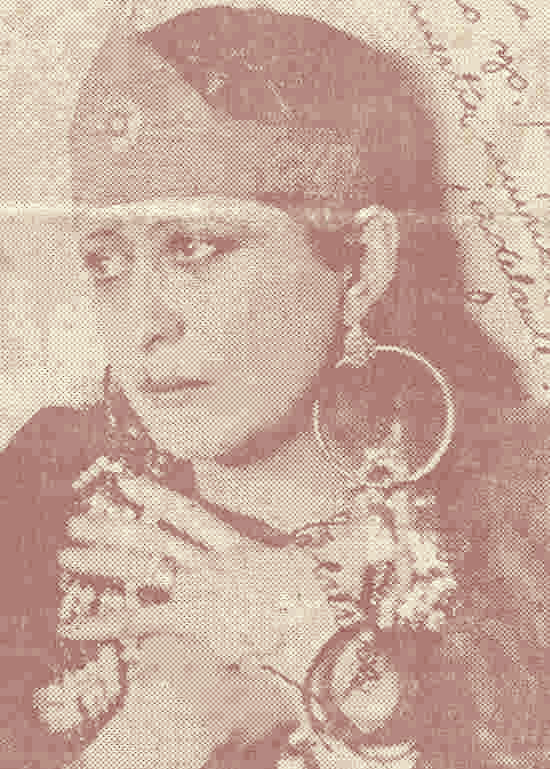
- from a Lima film magazine
- Died: 28 August 1981
- Other name: María Teresa Arce Ojeda
- Occupations: Actor; radio personality
- Known for: early Peruvian film actress
- Spouse(s): Mr Reilly, Guillermo Mesinas Barrantes
- Children: two daughters

Teresita Arce-Bouroncle O’Higgins or María Teresa Arce Ojeda ( ? – 28 August 1981) was a Peruvian actress who had a long career that began in the first films made in Peru.

== Life ==
Arce's place or date of birth is not certain, and her full name has two versions. It is said that she came from a Guatemalan heritage and as a child she was singing and dancing. She came to notice in the early years of the Peruvian film industry.

Arce was noted for her work in theatre company. She had a short marriage to an Irishman named Reilly in 1920 that resulted in two daughters. Luis Ugarte directed Camino de la Venganza (The Road to Vengeance) in 1922. The film featured Teresita Arce as the main role of Juanacha, a young native woman who acts against the exploitation of a mine operator named McDonald. He is killed after he kidnaps her. Arce became the first popular Peruvian actress.

Arce played the role of the bride of the bandit Luis Pardo Novoa in the romanticised film Luis Pardo. The film was made by Enrique Cornejo Villanueva in 1927 starring himself in the title role.

Peruvian radio in 2018 recounted how Arce became a comic personality on the radio around Lima when the radio was a prime means of communication. She created "Chola Purificación Chauca" who would talk about current events and she was well known and mentioned in a book by Mario Vargas Llosa. She came to grief when she made a joke about the powerful Prado family.

Her second marriage to Guillermo Mesinas Barrantes in 1955 was attended by a large crowd, and it was filmed as a Peruvian newsreel.

Arce continued to perform on the stage and the radio until the 1960s. She died in 1981.
