= Mirage (1972 film) =

- Film poster
- Directed by: Armando Robles Godoy
- Written by: Bernardo Batievsky; Armando Robles Godoy
- Produced by: Bernardo Batievsky
- Starring: Miguel Angel Flores
- Cinematography: Mario Robles
- Music by: Enrique Pinilla
- Release date: 1972
- Running time: 82 minutes
- Country: Peru
- Language: Spanish

Mirage (Spanish: Espejismo) is a 1972 Peruvian drama film directed by Armando Robles Godoy. Robles Godoy wrote the screenplay together with Bernardo Batievsky. It is the only Peruvian film to date to be nominated for a Golden Globe Award.

== Plot ==
A story about a young man who inherits a broken down estate at the edge of the Peruvian desert, with no explanation about the former owners or what had become of the once thriving house. By searching through the rocks and sands for relics, he discovers the answers to the mystery, told in flashback. The film combines the boy's search with other socio-economic issues relevant to Peru in a confusing, but insightful manner.

== Cast ==
- Miguel Angel Flores - Juan
- Helena Rojo - Rina
- Hernán Romero - Father Jorge
- Orlando Sacha - Don Francisco
- Gabriel Figueroa - Professor
- Rómulo León - Gabriel
- Raquel Meneses - María

== Awards and nominations ==
The film was selected as the Peruvian entry for the Best Foreign Language Film at the 45th Academy Awards, but was not accepted as a nominee.

Won

Cartagena Film Festival

- Best Film

Chicago Film Festival

- Best Foreign Language Film

Nominated

Golden Globe Awards

- Best Foreign Film – Foreign Language

== See also ==
- List of submissions to the 45th Academy Awards for Best Foreign Language Film
- List of Peruvian submissions for the Academy Award for Best Foreign Language Film
