= Alias 'La Gringa' =

1991 film

- Film poster
- Directed by: Alberto Durant
- Written by: Alberto Durant
- Starring: Germán González
- Production companies: Instituto Cubano de Arte e Industria Cinematográficos; Channel 4 RTVE
- Release date: 19 September 1991
- Running time: 92 minutes
- Country: Peru
- Language: Spanish

Alias 'La Gringa' is a 1991 Peruvian drama film directed by Alberto Durant. The film was selected as the Peruvian entry for the Best Foreign Language Film at the 64th Academy Awards, but was not accepted as a nominee. El Frontón is the main setting for the film.

== Cast ==
- Germán González as La Gringa
- Elsa Olivero
- Orlando Sacha
- Juan Manuel Ochoa
- Enrique Victoria
- Gonzalo de Miguel
- Ramón García
- Aristóteles Picho

== See also ==
- List of submissions to the 64th Academy Awards for Best Foreign Language Film
- List of Peruvian submissions for the Academy Award for Best Foreign Language Film
