= NN (film) =

2014 film

- Theatrical release poster
- Spanish: NN: Sin identidad
- Directed by: Héctor Gálvez
- Written by: Héctor Gálvez
- Starring: Paul Vega
- Release dates: 11 April 2014 (Lima); 17 September 2015 (Peru)
- Countries: Peru; Colombia; Germany; France
- Language: Spanish

NN (Spanish: NN: Sin identidad) is a 2014 drama film written and directed by Héctor Gálvez. The film was selected as the Peruvian entry for the Best Foreign Language Film at the 88th Academy Awards but it was not nominated. It is a co-production between Peru, Colombia, Germany and France.

== Cast ==
- Paul Vega
- Antonieta Pari
- Isabel Gaona
- Lucho Cáceres
- Gonzalo Molina
- Manuel Gold
- Amiel Cayo
- Fiorella Díaz
- Andrea Pacheco

== See also ==
- List of submissions to the 88th Academy Awards for Best Foreign Language Film
- List of Peruvian submissions for the Academy Award for Best Foreign Language Film
