= The Green Wall =

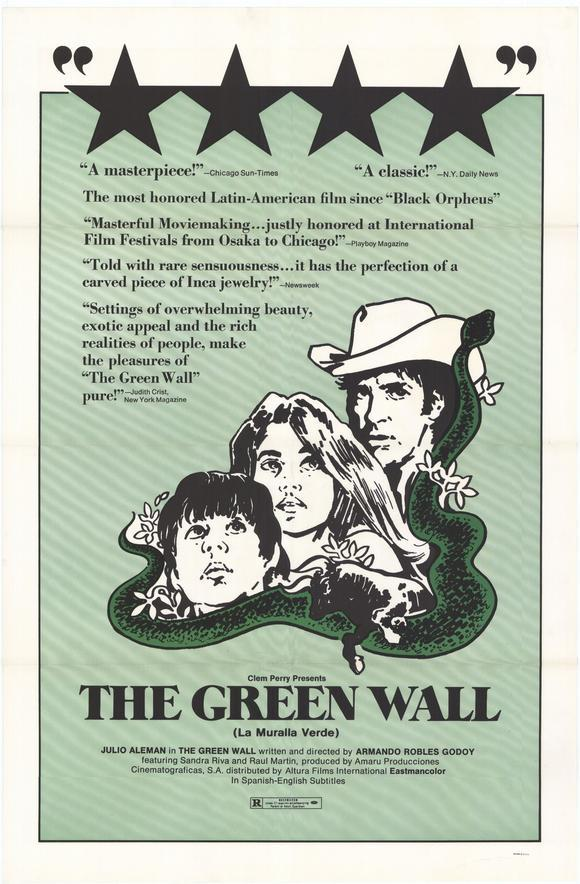
- Directed by: Armando Robles Godoy
- Written by: Armando Robles Godoy
- Produced by: Amaru Producciones
- Starring: Julio Alemán, Sandra Rivas, Raul Martin (aka) Martin Giurfa
- Cinematography: Mario Robles
- Release date: 5 April 1970
- Running time: 110 minutes
- Country: Peru
- Language: Spanish

The Green Wall (Spanish: La muralla verde) is a 1970 Peruvian drama film directed by Armando Robles Godoy. Robles Godoy also wrote the screenplay based on his short story by the same title. The film won the Golden Hugo Award at the Chicago International Film Festival in 1970 and was selected as the Peruvian entry for the Academy Award for Best Foreign Language Film at the 42nd Academy Awards, but was not accepted as a nominee. After being released in the United States, Roger Ebert named it the 5th best film of 1972.

== Cast ==
- Julio Alemán as Mario
- Sandra Riva as Delba
- Raúl Martin (aka) Martin Giurfa as Rómulo
- Lorena Duval as Madre de Delba
- Enrique Victoria as Padre de Delba
- Jorge Montoro as Jefe de tierras de montaña
- Juan Bautista Font as Director de colonización
- Escolástico Dávila as Escolástico

== See also ==
- List of submissions to the 42nd Academy Awards for Best Foreign Language Film
- List of Peruvian submissions for the Academy Award for Best Foreign Language Film
