= Adrián Saba =

Peruvian filmmaker

- Born: Adrián Bernardo Saba De Muinck; 31 December 1988 (age 37); Madrid, Spain
- Other name: Chaplin
- Occupations: Film director Screenwriter; Film producer
- Notable work: The Cleaner; The Dreamer; The Erection of Toribio Bardelli
- Relatives: Edgar Saba (father); Els De Muinck (mother); Nuria Saba (sister)

Adrián Saba (born December 31, 1988) is a Peruvian-Spanish filmmaker. He is best known for writing and directing the films The Cleaner and The Erection of Toribio Bardelli, both were selected as the Peruvian entry in the Best International Feature Film at the 86th Academy Awards and the 96th Academy Awards respectively. He also wrote and directed the film The Dreamer which premiered at the 66th Berlin International Film Festival.

== Biography ==
Adrián Saba was born in Madrid, Spain on December 31, 1988, son of the Peruvian playwright Edgar Saba and the Dutch director Els De Muinck. At the age of five, the family moved to Lima, his father's hometown. He spent the rest of his childhood and adolescence in the Peruvian capital, where he began to show interest in the world of cinema and theater. He lived in New York for several years, currently residing in Madrid. His sister is the singer-songwriter Nuria Saba.

== Career ==
At the age of 18, he received a Fulbright scholarship to train as a film director at Hofstra University in New York. His graduation thesis, the short film El Río (2010) (based on a story by Julio Cortázar), which won the first prize at the 11th Martil Film Festival.

In 2011, he founded the production company Flamingo Films. In 2012, he released his first film The Cleaner, which received a special mention in the New Directors category at the San Sebastián International Film Festival and also triumphed in the New Voices/New Visions category at the Palm Springs International Film Festival.

In 2013, the Cinéfondation of the Cannes Festival selected Adrián as one of the six chosen to be part of its artistic residency program La Résidence in Paris. In that space he developed the script for his second feature film The Dreamer (2016), premiering at the 66th Berlin International Film Festival and winning the award for Best Peruvian Film at the 20th Lima Film Festival.

In 2023, he premiered his third film The Erection of Toribio Bardelli at the 27th Lima Film Festival where it competed for Best Picture.

== Filmography ==
Year	Title	Director	Writer	Producer	Other	Notes
2010	El Río	Yes	Yes	No	No	Short film
2012	The Cleaner	Yes	Yes	Yes	No	
2014	Pocho	Yes	Yes	No	Yes	Short film, composer
2016	The Dreamer	Yes	Yes	Yes	No	
2023	The Erection of Toribio Bardelli	Yes	Yes	No	No	
