= A Martian Named Desire =

Un marciano llamado deseo
- Film poster
- Directed by: Antonio Fortunic
- Written by: Antonio Fortunic
- Produced by: Carmela Castellano
- Starring: Christian Meier; Robin Hunter; Bruno Odar; Aristóteles Picho; Adolfo Chuiman
- Cinematography: Micaela Cajahuaringa
- Edited by: Antonio Fortunic; Rafael Zalvidea
- Music by: Luis Quequezana
- Production company: Focus Producciones S.R.L
- Release date: July 24, 2003
- Running time: 85 minutes
- Country: Peru
- Language: Spanish

A Martian Named Desire (Spanish: Un marciano llamado deseo) is a 2003 Peruvian science fiction romantic drama film directed by Antonio Fortunic. Starring Christian Meier and Robin Hunter, the film covers the theme of the bricheros, who are Peruvians looking for an American partner to obtain permanent residence through marriage with her and to be able to go live in the United States. It featured the participation of the intellectual Marco Aurelio Denegri (playing himself), being the only time he was part of a movie. It was shot in the Peruvian cities of Lima and Cusco.

== Synopsis ==
Jorge is a young man from Lima who does not like living in Peru, arguing that there are no opportunities in this country and that everything is not going well here, so he wants to live in the United States. Despite having a job offer, his visa is refused at the American embassy for the second time and he goes into despair. However, he meets López, a friend from his school who tells him that he is going to live in the United States because he married a young woman from the North American country. He suggests that she also do that as it is the easiest way to go there legally and recommends that she visit Cuzco due to the high influx of tourists. Upon arrival, Jorge meets with Querubín, his best friend and who had lived there for several years dedicating himself to crafts and being married to his wife Andrea. In addition, he befriends Sublime, Querubín's brother-in-law who was a city policeman. Pretending to be a tour guide, Jorge meets Shirley, an American who was visiting Cuzco looking to contact the members of the Intergalactic Circle, an association led by the Master, who had the idea that the constructions of the Inca civilization were made by extraterrestrials and the young American espoused these beliefs. After attending the meeting, some tourists comment that they saw UFOs on the Inca trail almost reaching Machu Picchu, so both should go to the citadel. Then, Jorge pretends to be an alien named Arrech to conquer Shirley, achieving it in that form. However, the American becomes pregnant as a result of their encounter and he must find a way to explain all the lies he told her, even if he runs the risk of losing her.

== Cast ==
- Christian Meier as Jorge Gonzáles / Arrech
- Robin Hunter as Shirley
- Bruno Odar as Cherub
- Aristotle Picho as Sublime
- Adolfo Chuiman as The Master
- César Ritter as "Ganso" López
- Mónica Sánchez as Andrea
- Marco Aurelio Denegri as himself
- Carlos Alcántara Vilar as gentleman in the embassy

== Reception ==
El Comercio negatively rated the film for considering it "vulgar and offensive"

== See also ==
- A Streetcar Named Desire
