= The Inca, The Silly Girl, and the Son of a Thief =

- Theatrical release poster
- Directed by: Ronnie Temoche
- Written by: Ronnie Temoche
- Produced by: Verónica Oliart
- Starring: Carlos Cubas; Flor Quesada; Manuel Baca; Evelyn Azabache
- Cinematography: Micaela Cajahuaringa
- Edited by: Ronnie Temoche; Martìn Vaisman
- Music by: Pochi Marambio
- Production company: Perfo Studio
- Release dates: August 2011 (Lima); September 1, 2011 (Peru)
- Running time: 104 minutes
- Country: Peru
- Language: Spanish

The Inca, The Silly Girl, and the Son of a Thief (Spanish: El inca, la boba y el hijo del ladrón) is a 2011 Peruvian romantic drama film written and directed by Ronnie Temoche in his directorial debut. Starring Carlos Cubas, Flor Quesada, Manuel Baca and Evelyn Azabache.

== Synopsis ==
In a small town in northern Peru, three simple and marginal characters have or possess nothing, but they are not resigned to living without love. "El Inca" is a rude catchascan fighter who, in old age, loses his job. Seeing himself finished, without money or family, he wanders the streets looking for something that gives meaning to the last years of his life. “La Boba”, an illusory waitress at a roadside restaurant, dreams of finding the ideal man, the love of her life, among the travelers she serves, and in the few minutes they devour her dishes. But when she thinks she finds it, her problems start. "The Thief's Son" has no peace. Everyone points to him with contempt for being the son of the heartless criminal who swindled the entire town. Only María loves him, his young wife who is about to give birth. With no hope in sight, determined to do anything, he will look for a better destiny for himself and his family.

== Cast ==
The actors participating in this film are:

- Evelyn Azabache
- Manuel Baca
- Oscar Beltrán
- Carlos Cubas
- Alejandra Guerra
- Flor Quezada

== Financing ==
The Inca, The Silly Girl, and the Son of a Thief won The Global Film Initiative (GFSI) award and the Conacine 2010 Post Production II and Distribution Contest II award where they contributed money to finish the film.

== Release ==
The Inca, The Silly Girl, and the Son of a Thief premiered in August 2011 at the Lima Film Festival, and was released commercially on September 1, 2011, in Peruvian theaters.

== Awards ==
Year	Award	Category	Recipient	Result	Ref.
2012	27th Trieste Latin American Film Festival	Best First Feature	The Inca, The Silly Girl, and the Son of a Thief	Won	
