= Report on Death =

1993 film

- Film poster
- Directed by: Danny Gavidia
- Written by: Danny Gavidia
- Starring: Diego Bertie
- Release date: 13 May 1993
- Running time: 95 minutes
- Country: Peru
- Language: Spanish

Report on Death (Spanish: Reportaje a la muerte) is a 1993 Peruvian drama film directed by Danny Gavidia. The film was selected as the Peruvian entry for the Best Foreign Language Film at the 66th Academy Awards, but was not accepted as a nominee.

== Cast ==
- Diego Bertie
- Marisol Palacios
- Carlos Cano de la Fuente
- Carlos Gassols
- Martha Figueroa
- Aristóteles Picho

== See also ==
- List of submissions to the 66th Academy Awards for Best Foreign Language Film
- List of Peruvian submissions for the Academy Award for Best Foreign Language Film
