= Redemption (2023 film) =

- Theatrical release poster
- Directed by: Miguel Barreda
- Written by: Miguel Barreda
- Starring: Tatiana Astengo; John R. Dávila; Lucero López Ponce
- Cinematography: Leandro Pinto Le Roux
- Music by: Cristianpol Valdivia Astorga
- Production company: Vía Expresa Cine y Video
- Distributed by: V&R Films
- Release date: November 30, 2023
- Running time: 97 minutes
- Country: Peru
- Languages: Spanish; Peruvian Sign Language; Quechua

Redemption (Spanish: Redención) is a 2023 Peruvian drama film written and directed by Miguel Barreda. It stars Tatiana Astengo, John R. Dávila and Lucero López Ponce. It is about a religious couple who take in a rape victim with the purpose of adopting the baby when it is born. It premiered on November 30, 2023, in Peruvian theaters.

== Synopsis ==
Obsessed with raising a child, a couple of followers of a religious sect decide to house a young pregnant woman, a rape victim, in their home until the baby is born so they can adopt it.

== Cast ==
- Tatiana Astengo as Norma
- John R. Dávila
- Lucero López Ponce as Luisa
- Joaquín Navarrette as The Guy
- Mario Bedoya as Doctor
- Lina Alviz as Ticket Seller
- Julia María Montesinos as The Aunt
- Hugo Salazar

== Production ==
Principal photography lasted 5 weeks between February and early March 2022 in Arequipa, Peru.

== Accolades ==
Year	Award	Category	Recipient	Result	Ref.
2024	15th APRECI Awards	Best Actress	Tatiana Astengo	Nominated	
