= Lost Bullet (2001 film) =

Bala perdida
- Theatrical release poster
- Directed by: Aldo Salvini
- Screenplay by: Aldo Salvini; Luis Felipe Alvarado; Alfonso Pareja
- Based on: Noche de cuervos by Raúl Tola
- Starring: Rodrigo Sánchez Patiño; Pablo Saldarriaga; Daniela Sarfati; Monserrat Brugué; Ramsay Ross; Aristóteles Picho
- Cinematography: Juan Durán
- Production company: Iguana Producciones
- Distributed by: Iguana Producciones
- Release date: October 4, 2001
- Running time: 89 minutes
- Country: Peru
- Language: Spanish

Lost Bullet (Spanish: Bala perdida) is a 2001 Peruvian surrealist crime drama film directed by Aldo Salvini (in his directorial debut) from a screenplay he co-wrote with Luis Felipe Alvarado and Alfonso Pareja, based on the book Noche de cuervos by Raúl Tola. Starring Rodrigo Sánchez Patiño, Pablo Saldarriaga, Daniela Sarfati, Monserrat Brugué, Ramsay Ross and Aristóteles Picho. It premiered on October 4, 2001, in Peruvian theaters.

== Synopsis ==
X arrives with his friends in Cusco. The idea is to have a good time during the days of your stay in that magical city and that has the characteristics of the cities of southern Peru (that mixture of mystery and suspense in its streets). A guy Charly paints the other side of the city for him, X is willing to try everything, as long as he is only a few days in Cusco, he has to make the most of it. An unexpected ending can occur.

== Cast ==
The actors participating in this film are:

- Rodrigo Sánchez Patiño as X
- Aristóteles Picho as Charlie
- Pablo Saldarriaga as Rafa
- Daniela Sarfati as Pamela
- Ramsay Ross as Timothy
- Nicolás Galindo as Cirrosis
- Alberto Ísola as Brothel drunk
- Monserrat Brugué como Giovanna
- Gianfranco Brero as X's father
- Melania Urbina as Prostitute
- Norma Martínez
- Salvador del Solar
- Gabriel Calvo
