= Socos massacre =

1983 Civilian massacre during the Peruvian conflict

Socos Massacre
- Part of Peruvian conflict
- Location: Socos, Ayacucho, Peru
- Date: November 13, 1983 ( )
- Target: Civilians
- Attack type: Massacre
- Weapons: Firearms, grenades
- Deaths: 32
- Injuries
- Perpetrators: Sinchis of the Peruvian Civil Guard, led by Lieutenant Luis Alberto Dávila Reátegui
- Assailant
- No. of participants
- Defender
- Inquiry: Judicial process
- Coroner
- Charges: Qualified homicide and attempted homicide
- Verdict: Guilty (initially)
- Convictions: 11 initially, later amnestied.
- Convicted: Luis Alberto Dávila Reátegui members of the Civil Guard
- Litigation

The Socos massacre, or Soccos massacre (Spanish: masacre de Socos) occurred on 13 November 1983, when a group of Sinchis of the Peruvian Civil Guard in a state of drunkenness, led by Lieutenant Luis Alberto Dávila Reátegui, killed 32 people from the town of Socos, in the Department of Ayacucho, during the Peruvian conflict.

== Background ==
Because of municipal elections being held in 1983, on 27 August of that year, a detachment of the Civil Guard was deployed in Socos under the command of Luis Dávila Reátegui. The elections, where the Popular Action candidate won, were scheduled for 13 November, taking place normally.

== Events ==
On the night of 13 November, in the house of Alejandro Zamora Cárdenas, there was a celebration for the engagement of Zamora's daughter, Maximiliana with Adilberto Quispe Janampa. As part of the celebration, partygoers partook in food and drinks. Previously, the lieutenant governor of Socos had requested authorization from the Civil Guard for the event, and it was granted Zamora's house was only 200 meters from the local Civil Guard station.

During the celebration, the lieutenant governor drunkenly said in Quechua: "These sinchis are thieves, yesterday they ate the community beef. They are abusive, one day we will throw them away...". The sinchis, who were also drunk, asked Mario Jeri Gavilán to translate what the lieutenant governor said. After this, a group of the Civil Guard entered the house with their faces covered and carrying weapons. The officers ordered the residents to return to their homes, but they were intoxicated. Saturnina Sulca Noa, the governor's wife, rebuked them for their behavior and accused them of carrying out acts against the population. Then, the sinchis requested documents, while at the same time firing shots into the air. Ordering the guests to go out into the streets, the residents were made to walk towards Quebrada de Balcón. Before reaching the ravine, they stopped in Allpa Mayo where they separated the young women and sexually abused them. Upon reaching the ravine, the residents, including children, were killed with machine gun bursts. Then, they grouped the corpses together and detonated grenades so that the bodies would be covered by earth. The civil guards later declared that they had heard Sendero slogans during the party, which is why they detained those in attendance.

The only witness of the massacre (María Cárdenas) was able to save herself because she went unnoticed after she fell into a well. After emerging from her hiding place, she recounted what had happened. Upon hearing what had happened, Victoria Cueto and Vicente Quispe Flores organized the population and went to the police to report the incident; however, Cueto and Quispe were later murdered. The crime was attributed to a Shining Path commando because after the murder they shouted Shining Path slogans, but witnesses stated that the hooded men were wearing military boots.

== Judicial process ==
On 8 February 1984, criminal proceedings were opened by the First Court of Huamanga for qualified homicide and attempted homicide, and on 15 July 1986, eleven defendants were convicted, including six Sinchis, for the murder and attempted murder of the 32 residents of Socos, while 15 defendants were acquitted. The defendants were sentenced between 10 and 25 years in prison, but the first was released on 1 December 1988, and the last on 17 June 1991 (on conditional release). Civil Guard Lieutenant Luis Alberto Dávila Reátegui, sentenced to no less than 25 years in prison, was conditionally released on 5 April 1991.

After the amnesty law enacted by the Fujimori government in 1995, those responsible for the massacre took advantage of the measure and were granted amnesty.

== In popular culture ==
Peruvian director Francisco Lombardi based his 1988 film The Mouth of the Wolf on this massacre.

== See also ==
- Peruvian conflict

== Bibliography ==
- Final Report of the Truth and Reconciliation Commission: 2.7.Las ejecuciones extrajudiciales en Socos (1983). Lima 2003.
