= The Mouth of the Wolf (1988 film) =

1988 film

- Film poster
- Directed by: Francisco José Lombardi
- Written by: Augusto Cabada; Gonzalo Herrero; Giovanna Pollarolo
- Starring: Gustavo Bueno; Toño Vega
- Release date: 8 December 1988
- Running time: 128 minutes
- Country: Peru
- Language: Spanish

The Mouth of the Wolf (Spanish: La boca del lobo) is a 1988 Peruvian drama film directed by Francisco José Lombardi that is based on the Socos massacre. The film was selected as the Peruvian entry for the Best Foreign Language Film at the 61st Academy Awards, but was not accepted as a nominee.

== Plot ==
A military detachment arrives in Chuspi, a small town in the Department of Ayacucho. The story follows Vitin Luna (Toño Vega), who is attempting to make his ways up the ranks and enter officer school, his companion Kike Gallardo (José Tejada) and other troops must face the Communist guerrilla group Shining Path during the internal conflict in Peru, an invisible army that devastated the area and is seemingly superior. The troops are sent from the coastal metropolis of Lima and are racist towards the impoverished Andean peasants in the town due to cultural differences, seemingly arriving in a foreign land. Both groups use violence and terrorism against the local population to gain control, with the troops using tactics similar to the Dirty War.

During the first night in the town, a Peruvian flag raised over the barracks is taken down and replaced by a Shining Path flag. Troops respond by ransacking houses in the town and arrest one man, beating him for not responding, though the man only knew how to speak Quechua and did not understand the troops. After the death of Luna's commander, the strict lieutenant Iván Roca (Gustavo Bueno) arrives to rally the remaining troops. Luna sees Roca as his mentor; however, the officer has a dark past that will lead him to use brutal methods in the anti-subversive fight.

After returning from a fruitless patrol to find guerrilla fighters, return to a Chuspi that was attacked and covered with pro-communist graffiti. Roca responds to the incident by gathering all residents of the town in to the main plaza, raising a large Peruvian flag and forcing citizens to sing the National Anthem of Peru, "Somo libres" ("We are free"), while troops shove individuals who are not singing.

One night, Gallardo strolls to a shop where Julia, a shopkeeper who had previously rejected his advances, is closing for the night and forces his way in to rape her. Luna witnesses what had occurred and when Julia and a relative approach Roca the following day to tell the officer about the incident, Luna remains silent and the allegations are dismissed by Roca. Later that night, Kike and another soldier interrupt a celebration of a marriage proposal in the town, with the two being attacked while attempting to forcibly enter the event and being accused of raping Julia. Kike returns to the barracks accusing the partygoers of collaborating with guerillas in the area, leading to all of the villagers present being detained while others are violently interrogated. While torturing a man, Roca kills him in a rage after he is spit on.

In an attempt to cover up the incident, Roca orders his troops to march the villagers to a cliff and execute them, with Luna refusing to shoot. Luna is detained for violating direct orders and the cliff is demolished with explosives, covering the bodies of those massacred. When the troops return to their garrison, the imprisoned Luna mocks the hypocrisy of Roca calling him a coward, with the two playing Russian roulette down to the final chamber. Roca refuses to pull the trigger, demanding Luna to shoot him, though Luna refuses and fires the last round into the wall behind the lieutenant. Luna then last seen leaving the barracks and walking down the road while removing his military uniform.

== Cast ==
- Gustavo Bueno as Lt. Roca
- Toño Vega as Vitin Luna
- José Tejada as Gallardo
- Gilberto Torres as Sgt. Moncada
- Bertha Pagaza as Julia
- Antero Sanchez as Lt. Basulto
- Aristóteles Picho as El Chino

== Recognition ==
Year	Event	Nation	Category	Result	Source
1988	Festival de San Sebastián	Spain	Jury Prize	Won	
1988	Havana Film Festival	Cuba	2nd. Coral Award	Won	
1988	Havana Film Festival	Cuba	Award of the International Catholic Film Organization (OCIC)	Won	
1988	Havana Film Festival	Cuba	Glauber Rocha Award - Prensa Latina	Won	
1988	Havana Film Festival	Cuba	Cultural Tabloid Award "The Bearded Cayman"	Won	
1988	Havana Film Festival	Cuba	"Roque Dalton" Award from Radio Habana Cuba Station	Won	
1988	Havana Film Festival	Cuba	"La Giraldilla" Award, of the People's Power of the City of Havana	Won	
1988	Three Continents Festival	France	Montgolfière d'or	Nominated	
1988	Academy Awards	United States	Academy Award for Best International Feature Film	Pre-nominated	
1989	Berlin International Film Festival	Germany	-	Included	
1989	Cartagena Film Festival	Colombia	Best Film	Won	
1989	Cartagena Film Festival	Colombia	Best Director	Won	
1989	Cartagena Film Festival	Colombia	Best Script	Won	
1989	London Film Festival	United Kingdom	-	Included	

== See also ==
- List of submissions to the 61st Academy Awards for Best Foreign Language Film
- List of Peruvian submissions for the Academy Award for Best Foreign Language Film
