= Danny Gavidia =

Peruvian film and television director and cinematographer

Danny Gavidia (born January 24, 1963) is a Peruvian film and television director/cinematographer. He is best known for directing the Telemundo series El Señor de los Cielos, Enemigo Intimo and the film Reportaje a la Muerte.

== Career ==
Gavidia started his career directing Peruvian telenovelas María Emilia, Pobre Diabla, Soledad, Gorrión, Canela and Nino. He went on to direct the telenovela Al Son del Amor for Puerto Rican television. He has been in charge of feature films such as Reportaje a la Muerte, as well as a dozen short films and music videos.

From 2002 to 2003 he was made Director and Executive Producer of the Discovery Channel Latin America series Casos Medicos. The episodes followed different medical cases happening throughout Caracas, Mexico City, Guadalajara and Buenos Aires.

From 2004 to 2009, Gavidia worked for Telemundo Studios in Miami, where he directed the telenovelas Prisionera, Anita No Te Rajes, El Cuerpo del Deseo, Tierra de Pasiones, La Viuda de Blanco, Pecados Ajenos, Mas Sabe el Diablo, and El Rostro de Analia. He also directed the made-for-TV film El Primer Golpe.

In early 2010 he began directing the second season of Disney-Discovery Channel reality show Amazing Race Latinoamerica.

Since 2014 he has directed multiple series for Telemundo including El Señor de los Cielos (seasons 1-5), El Chema, Señora Acero (season 3), and Enemigo Intimo. He directed the telenovela El Baron in 2019.

== Personal life ==
Danny Gavidia was born in Lima, Peru on January 24, 1963.

== Filmography ==
Film
Year	Title	Role	Notes
1989	Juliana	Cinematographer	
1992	La Misma Carne, La Misma Sangre	Cinematographer/Camera Operator	
1992	La Lengua de los Zorros	Cinematographer	
1992	Viaje de Pascual y Pedro	Director/Producer	Short
1992	Una Pequeña Mirada	Director/Producer	Short
1992	La Ilusión de una Niña	Director/Producer	Short
1992	El Aniversario	Director/Producer	Short
1993	Reportaje a la Muerte	Director	
1996	Go, Run, Fly	Cinematographer	

Television
Year	Title	Role	Notes
1984	Malahierba	Director	
1994	Nino	Director	
1995	Canela	Director	
1995	Al Son Del Amor	Director	
1995	Gorrión	Director	154 episodes (1994-1995)
1996	Hombres de Bronce	Director	
1999	Maria Emilia	Director	
2001	Pobre Diabla	Director	
2002	Soledad	Director	
2003	Estos Chicos de Ahora	Director	Panamericana Television
2003	Casos Medicos	Director/Executive Producer	Discovery Channel Latam
2004	Prisionera	Director	
2004	Anita, No te Rajes	Director	
2005	El Cuerpo del Deseo	Director	123 episodes
2006	Tierra de Pasiones	Director	
2006	La Viuda de Blanco	Director	
2007	Dame Chocolate	Director	
2008	Pecados Ajenos	Director	
2008	El Rostro de Analía	Director	
2009	Mas Sabe El Diablo	Director	
2010	Mas Sabe El Diablo: El Primer Golpe	Director	TV movie
2010	Amazing Race Latin America	Director	Season 2
2011	Puertas al mas Álla	Director/Producer	2 seasons
2012	Corazon Valiente	Director	
2013	El Señor de los Cielos	Director	Seasons 1-5 (2013-2017)
2016	Señora Acero	Director	Season 1,3
2016	El Chema	Director	
2018	Enemigo Intimo	Director	Season 1-2 (2018-2020)
2018	El Barón	Director	
