= Martin Giurfa =

Argentinean-French neurobiologist and neuroethologist

Excellence-Class Professor Martin Giurfa
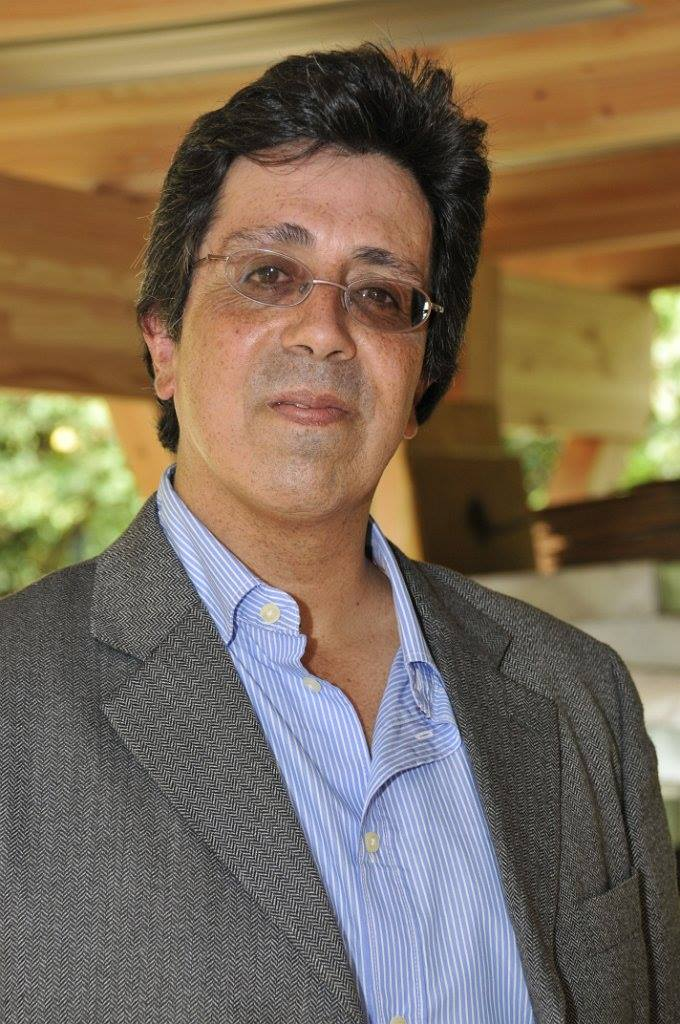
- Born: September 1962 (age 63); Lima, Peru
- Education: Faculty of Exact and Natural Sciences, University of Buenos Aires, Free University of Berlin
- Scientific career
- Fields: Neuroethology, Neurosciences, Animal Behavior Cognition, Learning & Memory, Invertebrates
- Workplaces: Sorbonne University; Paul Sabatier University; Free University of Berlin; University of Buenos Aires
- Doctoral advisor: Josué Núñez
- Other academic advisors: Randolf Menzel, Héctor Maldonado
- Website: www.ibps.sorbonne-universite.fr/en/research/neuroscience/insect-cognitive-neuroethology-eng; twitter.com/martingiurfa

Martin Giurfa is an Argentinean-French neurobiologist and neuroethologist (born September 1962), member of the German National Academy of Sciences Leopoldina, the Académie royale des sciences, des lettres et des beaux-arts de Belgique, and the Institut Universitaire de France (IUF). He is acknowledged for his work on the neural mechanisms of cognition in invertebrates, which he mostly explores using honeybees as models for understanding basic principles of learning and memory.

== Life and career ==
=== Early years in South America ===
Martin Giurfa was born in Lima, Peru, from an Argentinean mother who raised him alone and registered him as an Argentinean citizen. He grew up in Lima where he attended the French School Lycée franco-péruvien and moved to Buenos Aires, Argentina at the end of 1980 to study Biology at the University of Buenos Aires. Argentina was still under control of the military dictatorship (National Reorganization Process) and Martin Giurfa enrolled in the student movement resisting dictatorial oppression. Under the banner of the Partido Intransigente, a left-wing party, he played an influential role in that movement and in 1984, after the return of the democracy to Argentina, he became president of the Student Union of his faculty, the Faculty of Natural and Exact Sciences.

As many students in the Faculty of Exact and Natural Sciences, he benefited then from the return to Argentina of numerous prestigious Argentinean scientists who were in exile during the dictatorship and who participated in the academic reconstruction of the country (see Historia de la ciencia y la tecnología en Argentina). He met Prof. Josué Núñez, who trained him in the field of insect behavioral physiology and contacted him with German academia, in particular with Prof. Randolf Menzel Free University of Berlin, a leading neurobiologist working on color vision, learning and memory in honeybees.

=== Career in Europe ===
After obtaining his PhD Degree from the University of Buenos Aires under the supervision of Josué Núñez, he moved to Germany in 1990, to work at the institute of Neurobiology of the Free University of Berlin under the supervision of Prof. Menzel. He was first Fellow of the Deutscher Akademischer Austauschdienst and then Fellow of the Alexander von Humboldt Foundation. His first works focused on color and shape vision in honeybees leading to the discovery of color preferences. and color detection mechanisms by bees.

His work on symmetry categorization by honeybees in 1996 followed by his demonstration of concept learning in bees represented a turning point for the field of insect behavior, as they promoted a novel cognitive perspective to analyze honeybee behavior and decision making. This framework represented conceptual switch for a research domain, which had mostly attributed limited cognitive capacities to insects until then. In 1997, he obtained his Habilitation Degree of the Free University of Berlin and became group leader and assistant professor at the institute of Neurobiology of that University.

In 2001, he moved to Toulouse, France, as a Professor of Neurosciences of Paul Sabatier University. In 2003, he created the Research Center on Animal Cognition, a multidisciplinary research institute depending both on Paul Sabatier University and the French National Centre for Scientific Research, which focuses on the mechanisms of cognitive processing in various animal species and which he directed until 2017. From 2008 to 2012, he was President of the National Committee of Neurosciences of the French National Centre for Scientific Research and served in numerous French and European boards of neurosciences. In 2016, he adopted the French nationality. He has produced significant contributions dissecting the neural mechanisms of learning and memory in bees and other insects.

In 2023, he moved to Paris following an offer to become the director of the Institute of Biology Paris-Seine (IBPS) of Sorbonne University. He is currently and Exceptional-Class Professor of Neurosciences of Sorbonne University and will start his function of IBPS director in 2025.

Giurfa is a recipient of the Silver Medal of the French National Centre for Scientific Research and of an Advanced Fellowship from the European Research Council (ERC). He is also an elected member of the German National Academy of Sciences Leopoldina, the Royal Academies for Science and the Arts of Belgium and a senior member of the Institut Universitaire de France (IUF). In 2013, He was distinguished with the Raices Award of the Argentinean Government. He is an Honors Professor of the University of Buenos Aires and the Fujian Agriculture and Forestry University.

Giurfa has published ca. 200 articles in international scientific journals in the fields of insect cognition, insect neurobiology and insect behavior, many of them being highly cited. He is an Associate Editor of several scientific journals such as EJN, Learning & Memory, Animal Cognition and Frontiers in Behavioral Neurosciences among others. He is a member of Faculty of 1000 and deploys an intensive science dissemination activity to render scientific knowledge accessible to broad audiences. During the COVID-19 pandemics he established a highly attended series of virtual scientific seminars “to provide scientific stimulation and keep morale high in difficult times”.

== Research achievements ==
Martin Giurfa has pioneered the field of insect cognition and has investigated during several decades' elemental and non-elemental forms of learning. He adopted conceptual frameworks from experimental psychology and neuroethology to address questions on olfactory learning and memory in honeybees and performed the first experiments showing concept learning in insects trained to solve visual discriminations. He grounded thereby a field he termed “cognitive neuroethology” in which the neural bases of the cognitive capacities of animals are studied in the framework of their natural environment. He has developed his research addressing questions both at the behavioral level, establishing various novel protocols for insect conditioning and at the neural level, using multiple invasive techniques to record neural activity in the bee brain such as calcium imaging recordings, electrophysiology and neuropharmacological interference, among others. His work has led to the establishment of virtual reality scenarios for honey bees in which he studies their visual learning and decision-making. His discoveries have changed the way scientists regard insects and have brought, in particular, wide attraction and respect towards honeybees.

== Bibliography ==
=== Journal articles: most highly cited ===
- Giurfa M, Eichmann B, Menzel R (1996) Symmetry perception in an insect. Nature 382:458- 461. doi: 10.1038/382458a0.
- Giurfa M, Zhang S, Jenett A, Menzel R, Srinivasan MV (2001) The concepts of 'sameness' and 'difference' in an insect. Nature 410(6831):930-933. doi: 10.1038/35073582.
- Menzel R, Giurfa M (2001) Cognitive architecture of a mini-brain: the honeybee. Trends in cognitive sciences 5 (2), 62–71. doi: 10.1016/s1364-6613(00)01601-6.
- Stach S, Benard J, Giurfa M (2004) Local-feature assembling in visual pattern recognition and generalization in honeybees. Nature 429(6993):758-761. doi: 10.1038/nature02594.
- Guerrieri F, Schubert M, Sandoz JC, Giurfa M (2005) Perceptual and neural olfactory similarity in honeybees. PLoS Biology 3(4): e60. doi: 10.1371/journal.pbio.0030060.
- Giurfa M (2007) Behavioral and neural analysis of associative learning in the honeybee: a taste from the magic well. Journal of Comparative Physiology A 193 (8), 801–824. doi: 10.1007/s00359-007-0235-9
- Giurfa M, Sandoz JC (2012) Invertebrate learning and memory: fifty years of olfactory conditioning of the proboscis extension response in honeybee. Learning & memory 19 (2), 54–66. doi: 10.1101/lm.024711.111.
- Devaud JM, Papouin T, Carcaud J, Sandoz JC, Grünewald B, Giurfa M (2015) Neural substrate for higher-order learning in an insect: Mushroom bodies are necessary for configural discriminations. Proceedings of the National Academy of Sciences USA 112(43):E5854-62. doi: 10.1073/pnas.1508422112.
- Giurfa M (2013) Cognition with few neurons: higher-order learning in insects. Trends in Neurosciences 36(5):285-94. doi:10.1016/j.tins.2012.12.011.
- Avarguès-Weber A, Combe M, Dyer A, Giurfa M (2012) Simultaneous mastering of two abstract concepts by a miniature brain. Proceedings of the National Academy of Sciences USA 109:7481- 7486. doi: 10.1073/pnas.1202576109.

=== Books ===
Galizia G, Eisenhardt D & Giurfa M. (eds.) 2012. Honeybee Neurobiology and Behavior. Springer, 509pp.
