= No Stars in the Jungle =

- Film poster
- Directed by: Armando Robles Godoy
- Written by: Armando Robles Godoy
- Produced by: Antara Film del Peru
- Starring: Ignacio Quirós
- Cinematography: Jorge Pratz
- Distributed by: Argentina Sono Film S.A.C.I.
- Release date: 1967
- Running time: 90 minutes
- Country: Peru
- Language: Spanish

No Stars in the Jungle (Spanish: En la selva no hay estrellas) is a 1967 Peruvian adventure drama film directed by Armando Robles Godoy. The film won the Golden Prize at the 5th Moscow International Film Festival in 1967. The film was also selected as the Peruvian entry for the Best Foreign Language Film at the 40th Academy Awards, but was not accepted as a nominee.

== Cast ==
- Ignacio Quirós as Man
- Susana Pardahl as Woman
- Luisa Otero as Old Woman
- Jorge Montoro as Indian
- César David Miró as Kid
- Manuel Delorio as Landholder
- Jorge Aragón as Rubber Planter
- Demetrio Túpac Yupanqui as Commoner

== See also ==
- List of submissions to the 40th Academy Awards for Best Foreign Language Film
- List of Peruvian submissions for the Academy Award for Best Foreign Language Film
