= General Cemetery =

- Teaser poster
- Directed by: Dorian Fernández-Moris
- Written by: Javier Velasquez
- Produced by: Luis Fernández
- Starring: Airam Galliani; Nikko Ponce; Leslie Shaw; Marisol Aguirre; Jürgen Gömez
- Cinematography: Miguel Ángel Valencia
- Edited by: Roberto Benavides; Dorian Fernández-Moris; Percy Meza
- Production company: Audiovisual Films
- Release date: 25 July 2013
- Running time: 88 minutes
- Country: Peru
- Language: Spanish

General Cemetery (Spanish: Cementerio general) is a 2013 Peruvian supernatural horror film directed by Dorian Fernandez Moris. Written by Javier Velasquez, the plot is based on urban legends in the city's main cemetery. The film stars Airam Galliani, Nikko Ponce, Leslie Shaw, Marisol Aguirre, among others. It is produced by Iquitos-based Audiovisual Films company. The filming began in January 2012 in Iquitos. Moreover, it is an indirect sponsored film due to its ample, solicited budget support by state-owned and privately held entities.

General Cemetery is the first full-length horror film in Peru. The film includes extensive found footage scenes, a new film style in the country.

== Premise ==
Set in Iquitos, the story follows Andrea (Airam Galliani), a 15-year-old girl, who suffers after the death of her father. Her friends from school convince her to try and contact her father using a ouija board. However, this triggers a series of terrifying events.

== Production ==
General Cemetery was conceived in early 2011. The screenplay was co-written by Javier Velasquez and Dorian Fernández. The story is based in urban legends about the city's main cemetery, which were condensed in the script, and compacted to the investigation of facts.

Airam Galliani was selected to her role, when Fernandez-Moris found her in the Ensamble acting workshop.

Attempting to follow the found footage style, Fernández-Moris was influenced by Paranormal Activity, Cloverfield, REC and The Blair Witch Project.
