= Queens Without a Crown =

Reinas sin corona
- Theatrical release poster
- Directed by: Gino Tassara
- Written by: Gino Tassara; Lucía Covarrubias
- Produced by: Edith Tapia
- Starring: Daniela Romo; Francisca Aronsson; Alexandra Graña
- Cinematography: Andres Magallanes; Alonzo Ordaya
- Edited by: Gustavo Gonzales
- Music by: Lucía Covarrubias; Norton Tizado
- Production company: Sinargollas Producciones
- Distributed by: Cinecolor Films
- Release date: March 9, 2023
- Running time: 100 minutes
- Country: Peru
- Language: Spanish

Queens Without a Crown (Spanish: Reinas sin corona) is a 2023 Peruvian drama film directed by Gino Tassara and written by Tassara and Lucía Covarrubias. Starring Daniela Romo, Francisca Aronsson and Alexandra Graña. It is inspired by real events and takes as a reference the story of the girl Jimenita, "the monster of Pachacamac", "the monster of the bicycle", "Clímaco: the crazy man with the hammer", the attack on Arlette Contreras, among other cases.

== Synopsis ==
Jimena lives tormented looking for help to report the attacks she has been receiving, however her mother Sonia lives in a parallel world. His grandmother Deifilia, who leads a network of child trafficking, will not be the best help. Everyone around Jimena is complicit in what is happening, but only a few will try to help her.

== Cast ==
The actors participating in this film are:

- Alexandra Graña as Sonia
- Francisca Aronsson as Jimena
- Daniela Romo as Deifilia
- Claudio Calmet
- Rossana Fernández Maldonado
- Katia Salazar
- Kukuli Morante
- Matías Raygada
- Omar García
- Julio Marcone
- Mariano Ramírez
- Elena Romero
- Edith Tapia

== Production ==
Principal photography of the film began on March 24, 2022, in the Municipality of La Punta and ended on May 10 of the same year. The movie was filmed in Mexico and Peru.

== Release ==
The film was scheduled to premiere on March 30, 2023, in Peruvian theaters, but it was brought forward to March 9, 2023, to coincide with International Women's Day.
