= Armando Robles Godoy =

Peruvian film director

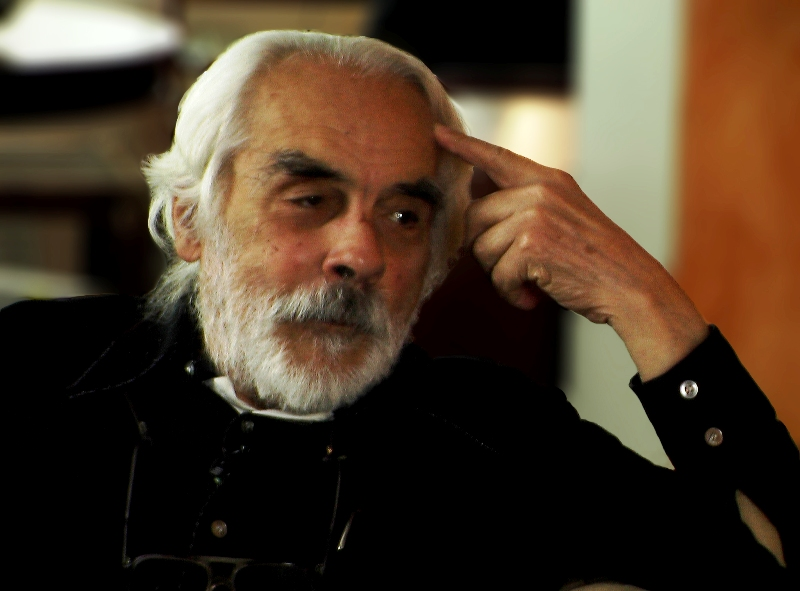
- Armando Robles Godoy (2006)
- Born: February 7, 1923; New York, United States
- Died: August 10, 2010 (aged 87); Lima, Peru
- Occupations: Film director Screenwriter; Writer; Journalist
- Years active: 1965–2010

Armando Robles Godoy (February 7, 1923 – August 10, 2010) was a Peruvian film director. He was son of the Peruvian composer Daniel Alomía Robles and Carmela Godoy. His 1967 film En la selva no hay estrellas won the Golden Prize at the 5th Moscow International Film Festival in 1967. In 1971 he was a member of the jury at the 7th Moscow International Film Festival. Director of Espejismo, so far the only Peruvian film to have been nominated to a Golden Globe award.

== Works ==
- Veinte casas en el cielo
- El amor está cansado
- La muralla verde y otras historias
- Un hombre flaco bajo la lluvia
- 12 cuentos de soledad
- El Cementerio De Los Elefantes

== Selected filmography ==
- Ganarás el pan (1964)
- En la selva no hay estrellas (No Stars in the Jungle,1967)
- La muralla verde (The Green Wall, 1970)
- Espejismo (Mirage, 1972)
- Sonata Soledad (1978)
- Imposible Amor (2003; first Peruvian feature film shot in digital)

== See also ==
- List of Peruvian submissions for the Academy Award for Best Foreign Language Film
