= Punishment (disambiguation) =

Punishment is the authoritative imposition of something negative or unpleasant on a person or animal in response to behavior deemed wrong by an individual or group.

Punishment or The Punishment may also refer to:

== Common uses ==
- Punishment (psychology)
- Capital punishment
- School discipline, punishment at school

== Arts, entertainment, and media ==
- Punishment (album), a 2011 album by American hardcore band Endwell
- "Punishment" (poem), a poem by the Irish poet Seamus Heaney published in 1975
- Punishment (TV series), a 1981 Australian soap opera
- Punishment (film) or Boot Camp, a 2008 North American film
- The Punishment (1912 film), an American short film
- The Punishment (1976 film), a Romanian film
- The Punishment (2022 film), a Chilean-Argentine film
- The Punishment (2023 film), a Peruvian-Colombian film
- "Punishment", a 1992 song by Biohazard from Urban Discipline
- "Punishment", a 2011 song by Man Overboard from their self-titled album
- "The Punishment", a 1998 song by Tarot
- "Punishment", a 2025 song by Mac DeMarco from Guitar

== See also ==
- Reinforcement
- Team Punishment, a mixed martial arts training camp
