= Charles Kelsey =

Charles Kelsey may refer to:

- Charles G. Kelsey (18??–1872), New York lynching victim
- Charles S. Kelsey (1822–1901), Wisconsin politician
- Charles William Kelsey (1877–1975), Canadian stained glass artist
