= Ancaster incident =

1826 attack on George Rolph in Upper Canada

The Ancaster incident was an attack on the Upper Canadian government official and politician George Rolph on June 3, 1826, in Ancaster, Upper Canada. Members of the Tory elite, motivated by suspected adultery and dislike of Rolph, dragged Rolph from his home and proceeded to tar and feather him. At the subsequent trials, government officials such as the solicitor general Henry John Boulton and the attorney general refused to prosecute the cases; instead, they recused themselves or acted as counsel for the accused. This led to several proceedings, in which Rolph was represented by his brother John Rolph, to determine which judges and court proceedings would be used for the trials. None of the defendants were criminally prosecuted, and Rolph received a verdict of £20 from two of the defendants; his appeal to increase the amount paid was unsuccessful.

Reformers, the political opponents of the Tories, cited the incident as evidence of the Tories' engaging in political violence to maintain their power, contributing to the Reformers' victory in the 1828 elections for the Legislative Assembly of Upper Canada. The Gore District magistrates dismissed Rolph from his position as their clerk, leading to a legislative inquiry into the dismissal and Rolph's reinstatement to the role. John Walpole Willis, a judge in the civil lawsuit's appeal, admonished government officials for not pursuing criminal charges. This incident contributed to the legislative assembly investigating the abuse of power perpetuated by public prosecutors. Historians have cited the incident to highlight the tensions between the ruling elite and the growing agrarian society in Upper Canada, resulting in the Tories using violence in an attempt to retain their political and social influence within the province.

== Background ==
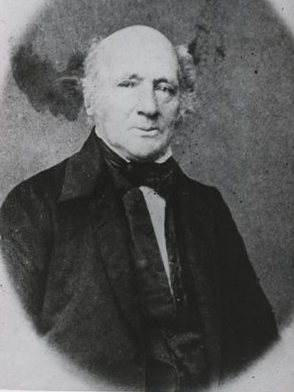
George Rolph, the victim of the attack

In the 1820s, citizens in places around the world questioned government reforms proposed by the ruling aristocracy. In Upper Canada, the ruling class was the Family Compact, colloquially called the Tories. They often appointed their members to political positions, believing their rule would provide more economic prosperity and political stability than leaders chosen through a democratic process. Those opposed to Tory rule were called reformers and wanted to expand the rights of citizens, particularly recent immigrants to Upper Canada from the United States. These policies threatened the political power of the Tories. Both groups relied upon sufficient appeal of their ideological system among the general population to obtain and maintain political power.

George Rolph was appointed as a clerk of the peace for Gore District in 1816. This position gave Rolph power over regional government affairs and caused him to work closely with members of the Tory elite. Rolph refused to associate with the Tories socially, avoiding galas and declining to give a toast at parties. He also refused to use his position to support the entrenchment of the ruling aristocrats, causing them to be hostile towards him. Many in the Tory elite believed that if Rolph left his position, a clerk friendlier to implementing Tory objectives would be appointed.

Rolph was a reformer; his brother John Rolph was elected to the Legislative Assembly of Upper Canada in 1824 under the Reform party label. John proposed that members of the Legislative Council of Upper Canada be elected rather than appointed to their positions; this change would make it more difficult for Tories to become members of this body. This and other Reform proposals caused the Gore District elite to dislike John, and by extension his brother George. John stated in a letter that his enemies, referring to Tories, were pursuing him and George due to his opposition to Upper Canadian society. At the time of the attack, John was in England to petition the Colonial Office to give citizenship rights to Americans who had moved to Canada. It is possible that some attackers of this incident wanted to signal their displeasure to John about his advocacy for this policy change.

A woman named Mrs. Evans left England with her child and travelled to Canada with George Rolph. Rolph allowed her to stay in his home, as she claimed that her husband was physically abusive towards her. Although she occupied a section of the home different from Rolph's bedroom, this arrangement caused rumours to spread that Rolph was committing adultery with Evans. A week before the incident, Evans's husband visited the nearby town of Dundas and tried to convince her to return to England with him.

== Incident ==
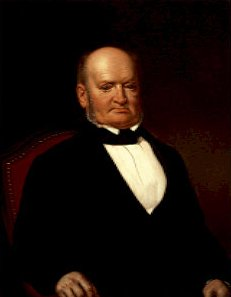
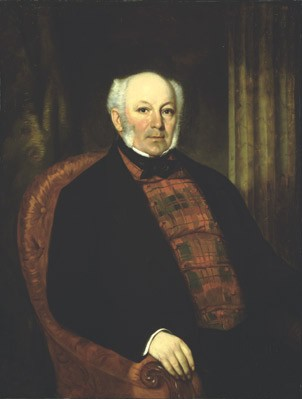
George Gurnett (left) and Allan MacNab were two of the perpetrators of the attack.

On the night of June 3, 1826, (Note: Some sources state that the incident happened on June 2–3; others state that it happened on June 3–4.) a group of Tory men met at the home of James Hamilton, a doctor and magistrate in Gore District. They chose to meet there because of its proximity to Rolph's home. The idea to tar and feather Rolph was probably suggested by Titus Simons; the practice was popular in New England, where Simons lived before his family fled to Canada as loyalists during the American Revolution. Other members of the group were Alexander Robertson, Simons's son-in-law, George Gurnett, Allan MacNab, and Alexander Chewett. Hamilton also invited his friend John Paterson to join the group, but Paterson refused and described this invitation in a subsequent trial. The group dined and drank alcohol before leaving.

The men went to the inn where Mr. Evans was staying, and all except one were dressed in disguises. They threatened Evans, accusing him of selling his wife, then dragged him out of the inn to speak with him about the matter outside.

The group, probably consisting of most of the same members that visited Evans, arrived at Rolph's home in Ancaster, Upper Canada. They were dressed in disguises consisting of sheets for clothing, with masks or black make-up disguising their faces. The disguises were probably meant to make Rolph and other witnesses believe that the assailants were of the lower-class community, making it harder to identify them. The mob invaded the home at around midnight, bound and blindfolded Rolph, dragged him outside to a field, removed his clothes, and applied tar to his skin while threatening him with more harm, including castration. On the way to the house, the group lost the feathers they were planning on using, so they gathered feathers from Rolph's pillow and applied them on top of the tar. The group also threatened to maim Rolph. This incident left Rolph half-conscious. It was noted at the civil trial afterwards that Mrs. Evans was not in Rolph's bed when the raid happened.

== After the incident ==
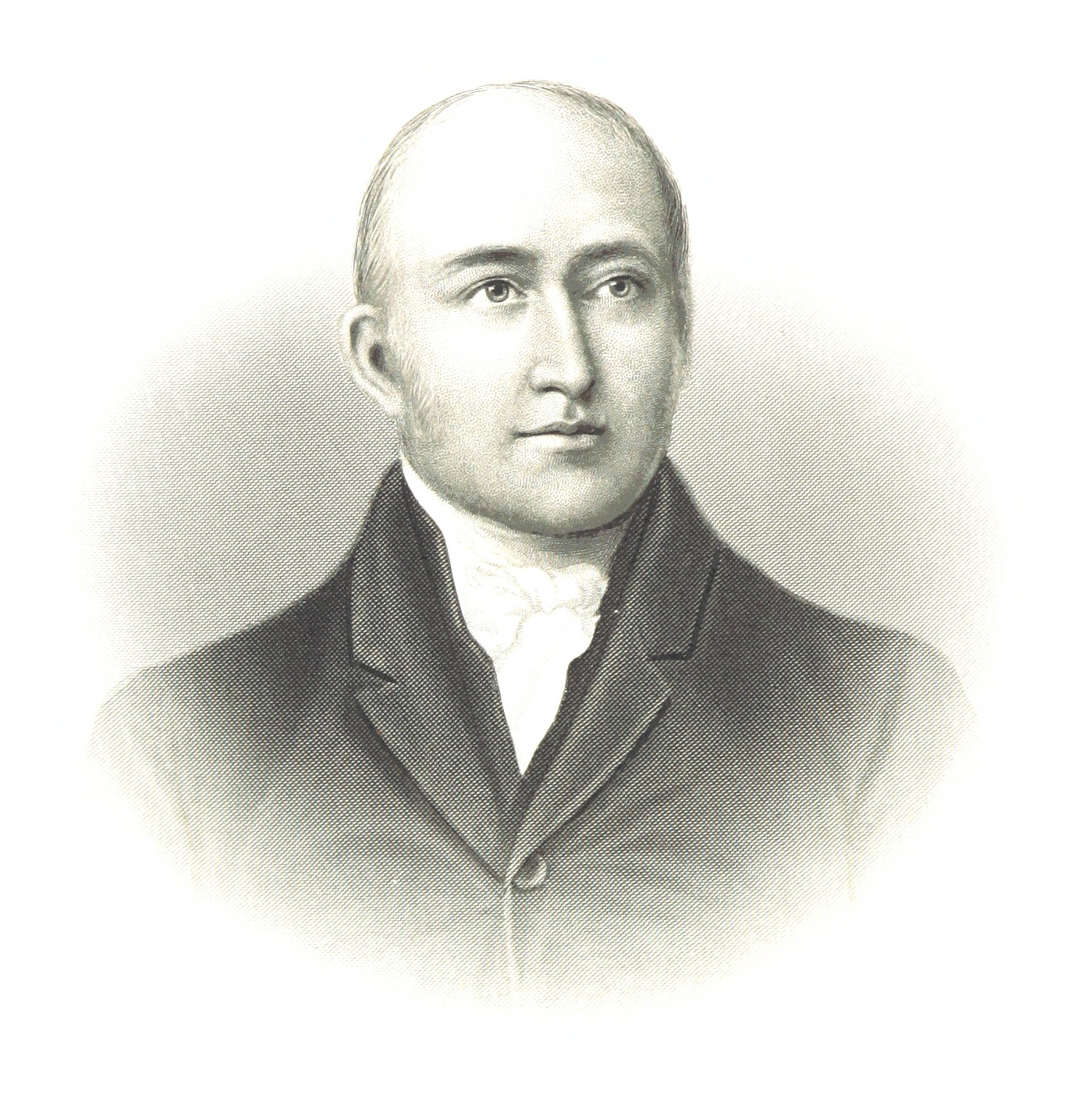
George Rolph hired John Rolph, his brother, to represent him during the lawsuits.

Rolph hired his brother, John Rolph, as his lawyer during the litigations. John advised George to postpone laying criminal charges, as it would be his word against that of the accused assailants. Instead, they waited until the assailants told others of their role in the incident.

In November, Rolph sent an affidavit to the province's lieutenant governor, Peregrine Maitland, implicating Hamilton as one of the attackers. Rolph asked Maitland to investigate Hamilton's role in the attack, as they worked together in the justice office of the region. Maitland responded that he could not initiate any action against Hamilton until a jury determined that Hamilton was guilty of a crime, and encouraged Rolph to initiate a civil lawsuit.

== Civil trial ==
Ten months after the incident, George filed a civil lawsuit in the District of Gore Assizes Court against the three assailants he could identify: Simons, Hamilton and Robertson. His lawsuit was for £1000 (equivalent to £91,372.27 in 2025) for trespassing on his property and assault. Rolph filed the case in this court because it would be presided over by a visiting judge and local jury, and avoid the biases of the magistrates in Gore District.

The civil trial began on August 25, 1827. The judge was James B. Macaulay. George, as the plaintiff, retained his brother John as his lawyer, with William Warren Baldwin serving as one of his co-counsels. The defence was led by Henry John Boulton who was the solicitor general of the province but was acting as a private attorney. MacNab and Chewett were also lawyers for the defence and refused to testify at the trial to avoid self-incrimination. Gurnett and Andrew Steven, the deputy clerk for the Crown, also refused to testify for the same reason, and Steven argued that his subpoena to be a witness was improper. When the judge questioned the four about this excuse, Boulton stated that their refusals were proper, and the judge deferred to Boulton's judgement and told Rolph that if this judgement was appealed successfully, Rolph could sue these four witnesses for damages. This ruling prevented Rolph from asking these witnesses under oath about the identities of the other perpetrators.

John Rolph raised concerns that two of the accused in the incident were lawyers for the defence. Maitland assured those involved that the trial would be fair. The trial began in August 1827 and was reported nationally and internationally, with a full gallery during most of the proceedings.

=== Plaintiff's arguments ===
In the opening statement, John stated that, although hesitant to represent his brother, he felt it would be a disservice if he represented others while declining his services to a relative. He described the action as "brutal" because the assailants were members of the aristocracy in Upper Canada and should have behaved as gentlemen. He noted that the jury was composed of men who were not members of the elite and that no one of their social standing participated in the attack. John argued during the trial that the assault was planned at the dinner Hamilton had scheduled at his home, and the tarring and feathering would have required the mob to purchase the materials ahead of time. John also stressed that the incident happened at night, which he argued meant that Upper Canadian law required additional criminality to the offence.

Witnesses testified that Simons told a neighbour about some of the details of the attack and that he was only ashamed that they lost the feathers and had to damage Rolph's property to get more. This implicated Simons as a member of the mob. A witness later stated that he saw Simons outside of the village at 2 am, but was unsure if Simons was in disguise.

=== Defence's arguments ===
Macaulay refused to allow evidence that stated that the attackers were trying to separate Rolph from Mrs. Evans or that they were punishing Rolph for committing adultery, declaring that neither was a legal justification for the incident. The defence's arguments would constantly reference this argument, hoping that the jury would feel the attack was justified. The defence did not try to establish that the accused were innocent of committing the incident. Two witnesses spoke about Robertson's involvement with the incident: the sheriff, who overheard Robertson say that he was not present at the attack, and Robertson's brother, who stated that he did not think Robertson would participate in this kind of incident.

After a short deliberation, the jury found Simons and Hamilton liable and each had to pay £20 in damages to George. Macaulay instructed the jury to acquit Robertson due to the lack of evidence presented at the trial against Robertson; the jury obliged.

== Civil trial aftermath ==
After the trial, Maitland asked Macaulay to issue a report on the trial's decision. Macaulay's report stated that a belief that Rolph was committing adultery was not a strong enough justification for the attack, so he refused to allow evidence which addressed this accusation. After reading the report, Maitland stated that Simons and Hamilton would not be reappointed as judges in 1827 due to their guilty verdict in this case. Maitland's civil secretary noted that if the two had grounds to successfully appeal this verdict, they might have been reappointed to the positions.

In an attempt to regain his position, Simons sent two affidavits from community members who said that Simons was with them the night of the attack and therefore could not have participated. Simons stated that he did not call these men as witnesses at the trial because their testimony might have identified other members of the mob, who would have been Simons's friends, and thus caused them to have to pay damages to Rolph. Simons also stated that it was a legal strategy to not call the witnesses: the plaintiff was relying on these witnesses to help their argument, so their argument and the awarded damages were weakened. Also, if defence witnesses were called to testify, the court's proceedings would have allowed Rolph to give the last speech to the jury before deliberations. By withholding these witnesses, Simons's lawyers were able to give their closing arguments after Rolph. In April 1828, Maitland appointed Simons as a commissioner of the peace, effectively rescinding his dismissal.

== Civil trial appeal ==
Rolph appealed both the amount of damages awarded and Robertson's not-guilty verdict to the Court of King's Bench in Upper Canada. The chief justice of the court, William Campbell, went to England before the trial in 1828 because of poor health. Therefore, the appeal was only heard by two of the three judges: John Walpole Willis and Levius Peters Sherwood. John Rolph continued to represent his brother as the plaintiff and was joined by co-counsels for the arguments. Boulton continued to be the lead counsel for the defence.

John Rolph argued in the appeal that a new trial was necessary. He said that Robertson would have been found guilty if witnesses such as MacNab or Steven were compelled to testify. His co-counsels cited cases where associates of crime were able to testify about the actions of others without describing their own conduct, with the judge ruling after each question was asked to determine if it was appropriate to ask, thereby avoiding self-incrimination by the witness. Rolph stated that Macaulay should have held these witnesses in contempt of court for not testifying. Rolph noted that at the civil trial, Boulton suggested that Rolph could seek these testimonies upon appeal, but at the appeal opposed the King's Bench interfering with the trial's decision. Rolph also argued that the amount awarded in damages was too low, that Boulton did not charge the attorneys who suggested to the witnesses that they should not testify (although ordered to do so by Macaulay), and that Boulton was allowed to allude to the suspicion of adultery without Rolph allowed to address the concern.

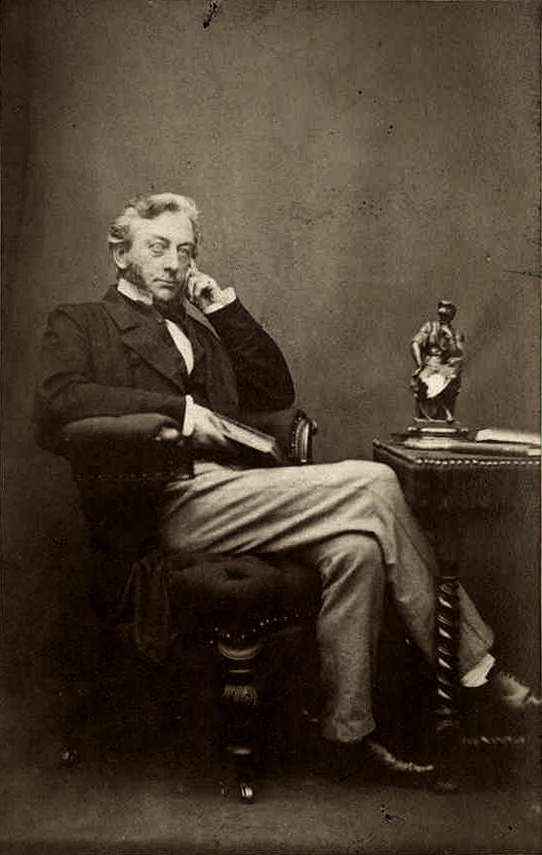
Willis was one of the two judges during the appeal.

The defence, once again led by Boulton, argued that the witnesses should not be forced to testify as they might self-incriminate themselves. He also stated that if the trial judge's decision was overruled, any plaintiff in Upper Canada could pay a witness to refuse to testify in a case, and then use that refusal to appeal an unfavourable decision. A successful appeal that forced the men to testify might also cause other cases to be successfully appealed, Boulton argued, causing the Upper Canadian courts to become overburdened with new trials. He challenged that if Rolph thought they were also perpetrators, they should sue them for further damages. Boulton also argued that a new trial would burden Robertson, as he would be found innocent again, and that the £40 awarded to Rolph was a substantial amount of money because it was enough for Rolph to run for the Legislative Assembly of Upper Canada. Boulton defended his decision to not criminally charge the defendants because he wanted to avoid the perception that he was trying to increase his workload for his government job, as he received a fee from the government for every case he prosecuted.

During the appeal, Willis admonished Boulton for acting as defence counsel as the defendants could be criminally charged for the events and, as solicitor general, he would have to act as the plaintiff in such a case. Boulton was also admonished for not criminally charging the witnesses who refused to testify. Chewett and MacNab were also accused of convincing witnesses not to testify, and Boulton delayed submitting supporting affidavits to the identity of witnesses for several months so that witness testimony could not be used to aid in Rolph's appeal. Willis ruled in favour of having a new trial and holding the witnesses who refused to testify in contempt. Sherwood stated at the trial that Rolph could have complained about Boulton's role as defendant to their court or a local magistrate if he thought it would interfere with his duties as the solicitor general. If a grand jury issued an indictment and Boulton still refused to prosecute the case, then the court could have initiated the prosecution instead. Sherwood ruled in favour of the defence, letting the ruling at the civil trial remain. Since Campbell did not participate in the hearing, this led to a tied vote which meant the appeal failed.

== Grand jury investigation and criminal trial ==
In April 1828, a grand jury was established to determine if criminal charges should be given to the perpetrators: the case was called King vs. Simons et al. During the proceedings, the jury received evidence that implicated others in the attack; it is unknown how this information was obtained. The grand jury recommended criminal indictments for ten defendants, administered by the attorney general of Upper Canada and submitted to the Court of the King's Bench. The defendants were the three named in the civil trial (Simons, Hamilton and Robertson), the four who refused to testify as witnesses in the trial (MacNab, Chewett, Gurnett and Steven) and three other defendants: John Law, Peter H. Hamilton, and John D. McKay.

The Gore District magistrates and the accused insisted that the criminal case be tried in the local courts, as this would allow the defendants' friends to control the process. MacNab argued during King vs. Simons et al that Rolph was trying to bypass the local court system to discredit the named defendants and characterize the attack as a government-sanctioned riot conducted by local officeholders. The accused also wanted the trial to start shortly after the indictments were announced, which could only happen if the case was heard at the local courts. John Rolph argued that his brother, as prosecutor in the case, had the right to take time to prepare for the trial. He also argued that the jury should be able to issue a ruling without undue pressure from the judge. The judge twice ordered the jury to leave the courtroom and consider the arguments. When they returned the first time, they reissued the indictment; when they returned the second time, they admonished the court for not transmitting their ruling.

The judge allowed MacNab to cross-examine George Rolph and the grand jury. MacNab claimed that the jury did not receive evidence implicating most of the defendants and called Rolph negative descriptors such as "ass" and "scoundrel" without admonishment from the judge. Rolph refused to answer MacNab's questions, stating that he did not have to respond to an accused party to the case. MacNab then asked the court to issue his questions, which they agreed to do. These questions were repetitive, and Rolph believed they were asked so that he would give inconsistent information in his responses. He therefore refused to answer further questions orally and insisted that the questions be submitted in written documents to which he and his lawyer could respond. On April 15, John Rolph presented a writ signed by Willis, telling the magistrates to halt their proceedings and send the case to the King's Bench. Each defendant was required to post a £50 bond to guarantee their attendance at future court hearings, and each had to have half the funds paid by two separate sureties, with no overlap among the sureties who paid for another defendant.

The criminal trial was scheduled to begin in September 1828. The attorney general declined to prosecute the case, and neither Rolph appeared at the trial because they believed it was the attorney general's role to pursue the case. MacNab claimed that the April sessions in front of the grand jury were a publicity stunt by the Rolphs to characterize the attack as an "official riot". The hearing resulted in the defendants' release without further consequences, ending the criminal trial.

== Aftermath ==
In the 1828 elections for the Legislative Assembly of Upper Canada, Tory politicians lost their parliamentary majority to Reformers. George Rolph was one such Reformer, elected as one of two representatives of Gore District. One factor in the Tory loss was the perception that they were engaged in political violence against their enemies; the Ancaster incident was cited as an example. When Tory supporters accused Reformers of disloyalty to Britain (of which Upper Canada was a colony), Reformers would respond with examples of violence and Tory refusal to prosecute their supporters, as occurred with this incident.

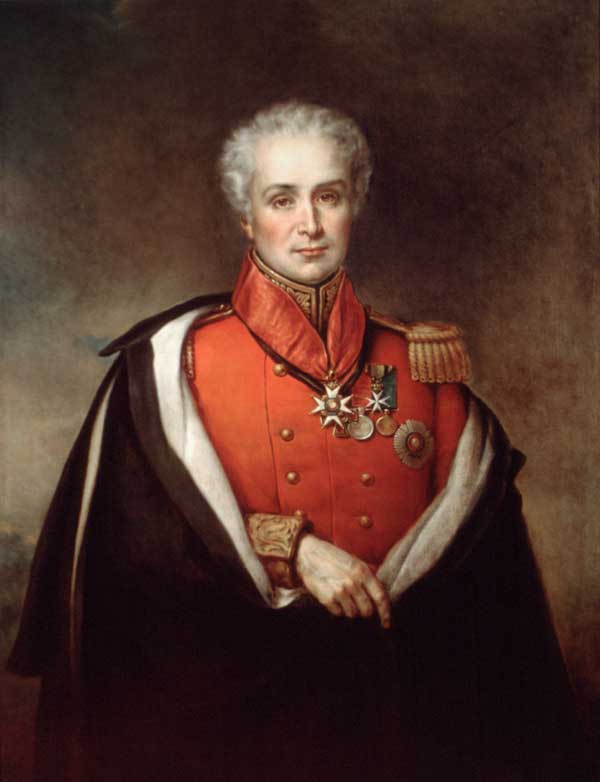
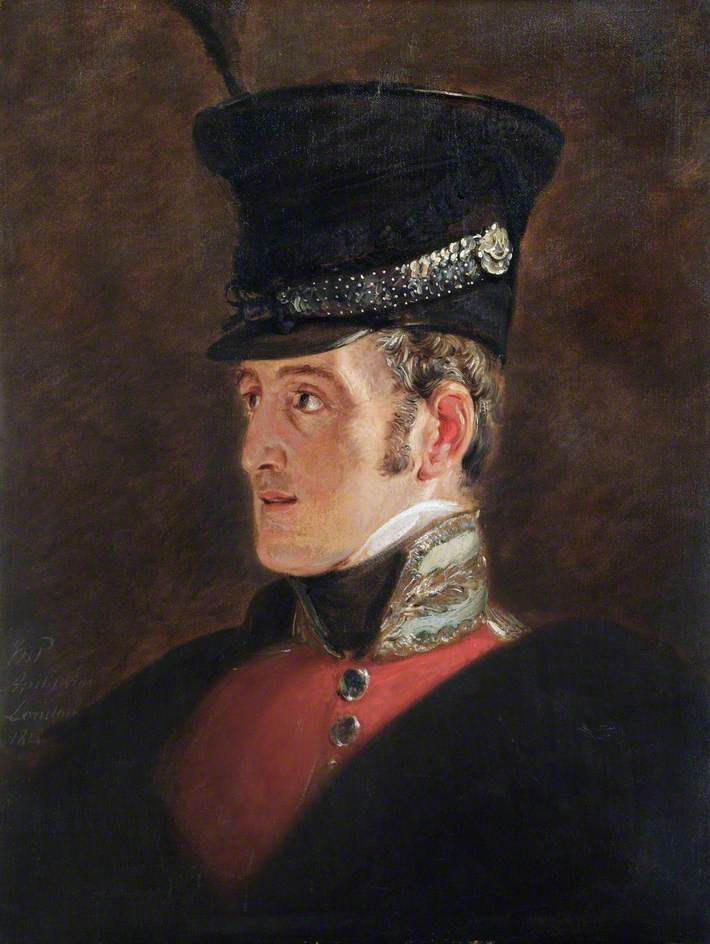
Maitland (left) refused to remove Rolph from his role as clerk of the court while he was lieutenant governor. When he replaced Maitland, Colborne (right) affirmed the dismissal.

During the grand jury assize, George Rolph used his position as clerk of the court to delay court proceedings, claiming that magistrates for the county had perjured themselves. The magistrates suspended Rolph from his clerkship. They requested that Maitland remove him from the role, citing unspecified concerns about his conduct in the role and allegations that, as their clerk, he should have allowed his criminal trial to be heard by their court. His removal was protested by Rolph and seventeen members of the county's grand jury, stating that Rolph had not done anything improper. Maitland refused the request, so the magistrates dismissed Rolph on their own in April 1829, giving five accusations including Rolph's insistence that he only speak to the magistrates through his attorney. Supporters of Rolph protested his removal to the new lieutenant governor, John Colborne. They stated that his dismissal highlighted political tension between the ruling Tory elite and the farmers of the region, and called for the magistrates to be replaced by farmers. Colborne affirmed the dismissal. A select committee of Upper Canada's legislative assembly condemned the magistrates for their actions and recommended Rolph's reappointment to the role.

During the appeal, Willis admonished government officials for not pursuing criminal prosecution in the case. William Warren Baldwin, a lawyer and politician in Upper Canada, criticized the Upper Canadian solicitor general John Robinson for not fulfilling the obligations of his government role in pursuing criminal charges in this incident, blaming Boulton's representation of the defendants for the lack of prosecution.

Simons died in August 1829. MacNab wrote a letter to Simons's brother stating that the estates of Simons and Hamilton were being levied to pay a portion of the cost of the tar and feathers used in the attack; he proposed that each of them pay £10 for their share of the cost. Robertson's reputation in the Ancaster area might have been damaged during the trials, affecting his business as a merchant. He returned to London, England, by 1832.

== Legacy ==
The attack was part of a series of actions by young Tory members who attacked symbols of the reform movement. In Gore District, another tar and feather assault in November 1827 targeted Jacob Hagle, a magistrate in Dundas, for marrying a woman several years younger; these assailants might have consisted of the same men who attacked Rolph, and might have been emboldened to attack Hagle because of the lenient damages they paid to Rolph. The next month, an unnamed lawyer's premises was broken into, with documents and property destroyed. In January 1829, an effigy of Colborne was hung in Hamilton. These incidents were collectively known as the "Gore District outrages". Outside the county, similar incidents included the Types Riot against William Lyon Mackenzie and the Niagara Incident when the government tore down William Forsyth's property to gain access to fortifications. These and other incidents caused the Legislative Assembly of Upper Canada to form a select committee to investigate the abuse of power perpetuated by public prosecutors.

This incident and its subsequent court cases highlighted the Upper Canadian social tensions between the growing farming communities and the established social elite. John Rolph mentioned this in the civil trial by calling the defendants "gentlemen" and congratulating the jury members, who were farmers, for being "yeomen". At the grand jury trial, the Tory local magistrates challenged the indictments of the grand jury, who were probably composed of farmers, in an attempt to have the criminal trial controlled by the local elite. Many members of the grand jury wrote letters to Colborne describing political dissension in the Gore district caused by corrupt magistrates, citing the judge's actions in this case as an example. The incident also showed the decline of the Tory dominance of Upper Canada's political and legal system, resulting in their use of violence to try to reverse this decline.

Boulton's refusal to initiate a criminal trial against the defendants followed a general philosophy of attorneys general and solicitors general in Canada: to pursue criminal cases only when the incident disturbed the public peace. In all other matters, they believed victims should seek justice in the civil courts. This policy allowed attorneys general such as Boulton to be hired as lawyers for civil cases, earning extra income. Reformers were infuriated with this practice, as demonstrated in this incident, as they believed the Crown should be advocates for justice and initiate criminal lawsuits in the protection of their citizens. Incidents such as the Ancaster incident show the tension of lawyers in Upper Canada between upholding the concept of everyone being equal under the law and the Tory elite wanting to prevent legal ramifications for their actions.

Reformers also disagreed with Boulton's legal argument at the trial, during which he stated that the defendants' actions were justified because they thought Rolph was committing a crime against public decency. In the Reformers' opinion, an attorney general tasked with defending the law stated that citizens were allowed to break certain laws, contradicting his role in upholding the laws.

== Citations ==
- Bailey, Thomas Melville, ed. (1981). Dictionary of Hamilton Biography. Vol. 1: Origins to 1875. Hamilton, Ontario: Dictionary of Hamilton Biography. ISBN 9780969102304.
- Godfrey, Charles (1993). John Rolph: Rebel with Causes. Madoc, Ontario: Condam Publishing. ISBN 0921453043.
- Johnson, Leo A. (1991). "The Gore District "Outrages," 1826–1829: A Case Study of Violence, Justice and Political Propaganda". Ontario History. 83 (2): 109–126. ISSN 0030-2953.
- McLaren, John (2011). Dewigged, Bothered, and Bewildered British Colonial Judges on Trial, 1800–1900. Toronto: University of Toronto Press. ISBN 9781442699779.
- Petty, Ross (2022). "The 1826 Ancaster Tar and Feathers Outrage: Three Defendants' Perspectives". Ontario History. 114 (2): 196–220. doi:10.7202/1092218ar. ISSN 0030-2953.
- Romney, Paul (1986). Mr Attorney The Attorney General for Ontario in Court, Cabinet, and Legislature 1791–1899. Toronto: University of Toronto Press. ISBN 9781487580209.
- Romney, Paul (1996). "Upper Canada in the 1820s: Criminal Prosecution and the Case of Francis Collins". In Murray Greenwood, Frank; Wright, Barry (eds.). Canadian State Trials, Volume I. Toronto: University of Toronto Press. pp. 505–521. ISBN 9781487596187.
- Romney, Paul (1999). Getting It Wrong: How Canadians Forgot Their Past and Imperilled Confederation. Toronto: University of Toronto Press. ISBN 9781442675315.
- Weaver, John C. (1995). Crimes, Constables, and Courts Order and Transgression in a Canadian City, 1816–1970. Montreal: McGill-Queen's University Press. ISBN 9780773565227.
- Wilton, Carol (1995). "Lawless Law: Conservative Political Violence in Upper Canada, 1818–41". Law and History Review. 13 (1): 111–136. doi:10.2307/743957. JSTOR 743957 – via Hein Online.
- Wright, Barry (1992). "Sedition in Upper Canada: Contested Legality". Labour / Le Travail. 29: 7–57. doi:10.2307/25143568. ISSN 0700-3862. JSTOR 25143568.
