= The Bad Intentions =

2011 film

- Theatrical release poster
- Spanish: Las malas intenciones
- Directed by: Rosario García-Montero
- Written by: Rosario Garcia-Montero
- Produced by: Benito Mueller; Wolfgang Mueller; Rosario Garcia-Montero; Paul Typaldos
- Starring: Fatima Buntinx
- Cinematography: Rodrigo Pulpeiro
- Edited by: Rosario Suarez
- Production companies: Barry Films; Garmont Films
- Distributed by: Ondamax Films (World-wide); 3C Films Group (Argentina)
- Release dates: February 2011 (Berlin); 13 October 2011 (Peru)
- Running time: 110 minutes
- Countries: Peru; Argentina; Germany
- Language: Spanish

The Bad Intentions (Spanish: Las malas intenciones) is a 2011 drama film written and directed by Rosario García-Montero. The film premiered at the 61st Berlin International Film Festival in 2011. It won the award for Best Latin American Feature Film at the 2011 Mar del Plata Film Festival. It was also selected as the Peruvian entry for the Best Foreign Language Oscar at the 85th Academy Awards, but it did not make the final shortlist. The film's lead actress Fátima Buntinx was nominated for a Young Artist Award as Best Young Actress in an International Feature Film. It is a co-production between Peru, Argentina and Germany.

== Plot ==
Cayetana de los Heros is a lonely and solemn 8-year-old child growing up in Peru during the turbulent 1980s. She is from a wealthier middle-class family and even has a chauffeur drive her to and from school. Her parents are divorced, and she hardly ever sees her disinterested father, the quintessential Latino playboy, much to her dismay. Instead, she resides with her remarried mother and stepfather in a gated property on the outskirts of Lima, cared for primarily by servants while they travel abroad.

The film begins with a picture show and an unseen narrator recounting the fatal sacrifices former Peruvian military leaders made for their country. The scene then cuts to a classroom full of girls as a siren suddenly goes off and the children are evacuated from the building. A driver picks her up from school referring to her as Miss Cayetana, but she is unfazed by the status and remains mostly silent on the way home though at one point when a beggar approaches car she offers him her medication and comments that it suppresses the appetite.

At home later, Cayetana sits alone at the table in front of a full plate of food and doesn't touch it at all, until a maid scolds her and clears the table. The maids fuss over her in the morning so that she looks pretty for her mother's return, but she has to be dragged out of the closet in which she is hiding to go meet her mother because she doesn't want to see her. Eventually, she sits stiffly on her mother's lap as her stepfather looks on and gives her gifts, but the reunion doesn't last long when Cayetana reacts to her mother's pregnancy news by storming out of the room into her bedroom. She then decides to run away, but gets lost and is forced to return home. It is then she decides to punish her mother by withdrawing all affections and dying on the baby's delivery date.

At school, her cousin Jimena, who is chronically ill, is a source of companionship and reprieve, following her to the bathroom when she dumps her lunch in the trash and offering to share her own lunch. Cayetana withdraws even deeper into herself and begins to act out at home. Her worried parents' send her away on vacation to Lima with Jimena's family after the holiday festivities, not knowing what else to do with her.

The vacation is pleasant with boating, swimming, playing on the beach with Jimena, and leisurely meals. For the first time in a long while, Cayetana is truly content and happy, until her mother and stepfather arrive unannounced hoping to surprise Cayetana. She refuses to hug or even speak to her by now noticeably pregnant mother. Jimena suffers a medical emergency one night and is whisked off to hospital leaving Cayetana to wander the beach alone eventually climbing a very steep sand dune and experiencing a hallucination/vision of the Peruvian heroes and Jimena, who tells her that she loves and will always watch over her.

When Cayetana is dropped off at vacation's end it is obvious that the political situation has worsened significantly, as her house has been robbed. Soon Cayetana's mother and stepfather leave for the hospital, leaving her once again with the servants. A few days later, she is taken to the hospital and dropped off to see her newborn half-brother. While there she wanders the wards aimlessly ending up outside the door of Jimena's room where a doctor is testing the latter with coordination exercises and helps Jimena do the test by miming the actions unseen by the doctor. It is clear that Jimena's mind is no longer all there and she is incredibly weak, not recognizing Cayetana at all. When Cayetana finally makes her way to the maternity ward and nursery, she picks the wrong baby out as her mother's son for some reason and hisses with obvious jealousy that she will not be upstaged by him. She no longer wants to die. From there she goes into where the babies are kept in the hospital and finds her new baby brother.

== Cast ==
- Fátima Buntinx as Cayetana
- Katerina D'Onofrio as Inés
- Melchor Gorrochátegui as Isaac
- Kani Hart as Jimena
- Jean-Paul Strauss as Francisco
- Paul Vega as Ramón

== Soundtrack ==
Title	Songwriters	Performers
"La Negrita"	Traditional	Rosario García-Montero
"La Catalina"	Traditional (Spain)	Rosario García-Montero
"A la molina no voy mas"	Traditional (Peru)	Rosario García-Montero
"Tengo una muneca"	Traditional	Rosario García-Montero
"Es mi vida"	Salvatore Adamo, EMI Music	Salvatore Adamo

== See also ==
- List of submissions to the 85th Academy Awards for Best Foreign Language Film
- List of Peruvian submissions for the Academy Award for Best Foreign Language Film
