= Juana Burga =

Peruvian model

- Born: Lima, Peru
- Modeling information
- Hair color: Dark Brown
- Eye color: Brown
- Agency: The Lions (New York); Elite Model Management (Paris, Milan, London, Amsterdam, Copenhagen); Sight Management Studio (Barcelona); Modelwerk (Hamburg); Munich Models (Munich)

Juana Burga Cervera is a Peruvian model, actress, and activist. She is the only Peruvian fashion model to have walked in New York, London, Milan, and Paris Fashion Weeks. Cosas Magazine Peru named her the most successful Peruvian model of all time, and Ellos & Ellas Magazine named her one of the most powerful Peruvian women in March 2017.

== Career ==
In addition to modelling and acting, Burga is an Ambassador in Peru, where she works to protect the artisans who produce sustainable fibres and then export the material around the world. In her opinion, she is "Peru's engine of sustainable fashion." Juana has been documenting Peruvian textile-artisans for the past three years and launched an exhibition on the artisans in Lima, Peru, in November 2017. Juana is also a supporter of the Parley for the Oceans organisation, and she recently returned from a trip to the Maldives. She attended Parley's Ocean School alongside Chris Hemsworth, Diego Luna, MIA, and others in order to learn about the issues and find solutions to plastic pollution in the oceans.

In 2017, she starred in The Unseen (Los Ultimos), a post-apocalyptic movie. In 2023, she starred The Most Feared Skin (La piel más temida), a Peruvian-Colombian drama film.

Burga currently resides in New York City and travels frequently to Peru.

She is married to Martín Landgreve, a Danish film director.

== Agencies ==
- The Lions (agency) - New York City
- Elite Model Management - Paris
- Elite Model Management - Milan
- Elite Model Management - London
- Munich Models
- Sight Management - Barcelona
- Unique Models - Copenhagen
- Modelwerk - Hamburg

== Awards ==
Burga won the 2007 Elite Model Look contest of Peru.
