= Katerina D'Onofrio =

Peruvian actress (born 1978)

- Born: Katerina D'Onofrio Dibós; 6 June 1978 (age 47); Lima, Peru
- Occupation: Actress

Katerina D'Onofrio Dibós (born 6 June 1978) is a Peruvian actress.

== Career ==
In 2006, D'Onofrio appeared on Season 2 of La Gran Sangre as Venus, the leading role that led her to fame. A member of the group "the evil goddesses", she played the partner of a main character at the time of his death. A year later, also in an antagonistic role, she participated in Un amor indomable.

In early 2011, she appeared in The Bad Intentions as Ines, the mother of Cayetana. Directed by Rosario García-Montero, this won the Best Peruvian Film Award at the Lima Festival and the Special Jury Prize at the Gramado Film Festival. In August 2011, she played Leonor in the telenovela La Perricholi, a woman born in the Viceroyalty of New Granada.

In 2012–13, D'Onofrio performed in the plays Botella borracha and El sistema solar, the latter by Mariana de Althaus.

In 2014, she debuted on the series Mi amor, el wachimán as Lieutenant Angélica.

In 2015, she was invited to perform at Microteatro-Lima in the successful play ¿Te comió la lengua el ratón?, where she played the character Paula. The play was written by Federico Abrill and Jimena Del Sante, directed by Del Sante, and co-starred the international actress Diana Quijano.

In 2017, she appeared in the Ecuadorian film Verano no miente.

In 2023, she appeared in the Peruvian-Colombian film The Most Feared Skin.

== Filmography ==
=== Films ===
| Year | Title | Role | Director |
|---|---|---|---|
| 2011 | The Bad Intentions | Inés | Rosario Garcia-Montero |
| 2013 | La amante del libertador | Sor Elena | Rocío Lladó |
| 2013 | Algo huele raro en la maleta | Berenice | Guille Isa (short) |
| 2014 | Nómades | | |
| 2014 | Extirpator of Idolatries | Mythical character | Manuel Siles |
| 2014 | Sebastian | Lucía | Walter Ciurlizza |
| 2016 | Siete Semillas | Shareholder | Daniel Rodríguez Risco |
| 2016 | La última tarde | Laura | Joel Calero |
| 2017 | Me haces bien | Rebeca | Jesus Alvarez Betancourt |
| 2017 | Verano no miente | Julia | Ernesto Santisteban |
| 2023 | The Most Feared Skin | | Joel Calero |

=== Television ===
| Year | Title | Character | Notes |
|---|---|---|---|
| 2006 | La Gran Sangre 2 | Venus | Antagonist role |
| 2007 | La Gran Sangre 4 | Venus | Guest actress |
| 2007 | Un amor indomable | Carola | Antagonist role |
| 2009 | El enano | Yesenia | |
| 2010 | Broders | Jenny | 1 episode |
| 2011 | La Perricholi | Leonor | |
| 2014 | Mi amor, el wachimán | Angélica | |
| 2015 | Ramírez | Beatriz | |
| 2017 | Pensión Soto | Linda | |

== Theater ==
- Ángeles (2003, dir: Javier Echevarría)
- Jesus Christ Superstar (2006, dir: Mateo Chiarella)
- El mago en el país de las maravillas (2006, dir: Javier Valdés)
- El duende (2008, dir: Ernesto Barraza Eléspuru)
- Un musical para navidad (2008)
- El misterio del ramo de rosas as the nurse (2009, dir: Carlos Tolentino)
- Viaje a la luna (2010, dir: Mateo Chiarella Viale)
- Jarana (2010, dir: Carlos Tolentino)
- Break as Pamela (2011, dir: Ernesto Barraza Eléspuru)
- Ficción (2011, Spanish Cultural Center)
- Botella borracha as Jimena (2012–13)
- Karamazov as Grushenka (2014, dir: Mariana de Althaus)
- El sistema solar as Edurne (2012–15)
- Una historia Original de Vanessa Vizcarra (2015)
- ¿Te comió la lengua el ratón? as Paula (2015)

== Awards and nominations ==
| Year | Award | Category | Work | Result |
|---|---|---|---|---|
| 2012 | El Comercio Luces Awards | Best Theater Actress | El sistema solar | Nominated |
| 2017 | Punta del Este International Film Festival | Best Actress | La última tarde | Winner |
