= La Gran Sangre =

Peruvian action adventure television series

- Created by: Jorge Carmona; Aldo Miyashiro
- Starring: Carlos Alcántara; Aldo Miyashiro; Pietro Sibille et al.
- Country of origin: Peru
- Original language: Spanish

Production
- Running time: 40-45 minutes per episode (without advertisements)

Original release
- Network: Frecuencia Latina

La Gran Sangre ("The Great Blood") is a Peruvian action adventure television series about a fictional group of social outcasts who work as soldiers of fortune in the city of Lima, Peru.

Despite being thought of as mercenaries, the trio always acts on the side of the good guys and help those who are in need. The series' innovative visual style inspired by comic books consists on a combination of live action scenes and short animated sequences (creators have stated Frank Miller's Sin City graphic novels and Quentin Tarantino movies as influences). This, along with an action-packed plot and appealing characters turned it into a big success all over the country.

The show ran for four seasons on Frecuencia Latina Peruvian television network. Additionally, in August 2007 opened the first movie in this series.

== Origins ==
While shooting a car chase scene for the mini-series "Lobos de Mar" Jorge Carmona and Aldo Miyashiro thought about making their next project about a group of urban heroes. Ivan Lozano, the art director developed the character design using animation giving the creative duo the idea of combining live action with animation and comic book language.

== Premise ==
La Gran Sangre is the name that Dragon, Mandril and Tony Blades, gave themselves after making a pact in which they swore to protect the oppressed. Friends since they were kids, each one of them had to live very difficult experiences in order to discover their true calling as justicieros (vigilantes).

The group became a legend in the streets of Lima, known and respected by everyone, the three heroes protected the city for a long time, until Tony supposedly betrayed the others causing the breakup of the group. The once inseparable friends ended their brotherhood and the criminals returned to the streets. After breaking the blood pact that united them, they took different paths and swore not to see each other again.

Years later, when La Gran Sangre was nothing but a myth to many, a desperate businessman whose 15-year-old daughter had been kidnapped accomplished what seemed impossible: find Dragon, the former leader of the group, now a martial arts expert committed to help teenagers from a rough neighborhood keep away from drugs and gangs. Dragon was reluctant to search for his old friends, but finally, he realized they were the only ones that could save the girl's life, and after much struggling to convince Mandril and Tony, they made a new pact and became La Gran Sangre again.

== Cast and characters ==
=== Main characters ===
- Carlos Alcántara as Dragon (Seasons: 1; 2; 3): The leader of La Gran Sangre, he was a police officer who was accused of a crime he didn't commit, kicked out of the force and finally thrown in jail. Abandoned by his wife he did his time and grew angry against the justice system that he always protected and turned its back on him in exchange. It was during those years in prison that he met the man who would later introduce him to his master. He was absolved for good behavior, and began his training in martial arts, combining traditional techniques such as kung fu with street fighting. along with Tony and Mandril, his childhood friends, makes a promise to protect the innocent and the oppressed and seal it with a blood pact giving birth to La Gran Sangre. After the group broke up he disappeared from the public eye and opened a dojo in a rough neighborhood of the city where he teaches martial arts to teenagers as a way to improve their self esteem and keep them off gangs and drugs.
- Aldo Miyashiro as Tony Blades (Seasons: 1; 2; 3; 4)
- Pietro Sibille as Mandril (Seasons: 1; 2; 3; 4)

=== Additional team members ===
- Norka Ramirez as Raquel (Seasons: 1; 2; 3)
- Joel Ezeta as Johan (Seasons: 1; 2; 3; 4)
- Lucho Caceres as Cobra (Seasons: 1; 2; 3)
- Roxana Yepez as Ivana (Only as Ivana, season: 4)

=== Recurring antagonists and supporting characters ===
- Juan Manuel Ochoa as Mesias (Season: 4)
- Rómulo Assereto Uno (Season: 4)
- María Claudia Carmona Elena(Season: 4)

=== Los Malignos (the evil gang) ===
- Conde (played by Haysen Percovich)(Seasons: 1; 3; 4)
- Seca (played by Roxana Yepez)(Only as Seca, seasons: 1; 2; 3)
- Verdes (played by Ivan Chavez)(Seasons: 1; 3)

=== Las Diosas Malditas (the evil goddesses) ===
- Diana (played by Camila MacLennan)(Season: 2; 4)
- Medusa (played by Erika Villalobos)(Season: 2; 4)
- Venus (played by Katerina D'Onofrio)(Season: 2; 4)
- Gaia (played by Francesca Brivio)(Season: 2)
- Ceres (played by Lizeth Chavez)(Season: 2)

=== Gringo's gang ===
- Gringo (played by Diego Caceres)(Season: 3)
- Ming Nao (played by Angie Jibaja)(Season: 3)
- Doncella (played by Lita Baluarte)(Season: 3)
- Roble (played by Carlos Cardozo)(Season: 3)

=== Supporting characters ===
- David Kam as El Maestro (Dragon's master) (Season: 2 / Guest starring: 1; 3)
- Anahi Vargas as Tota (Season: 2 / Guest starring: 3)
- Liz
- Brujo

=== Other bad guys ===
- Cholo
- Maestro del mal (evil master)

== Season synopses ==
=== Season One ===
A 15-year-old girl named Allison Tamani has been kidnapped. It's been 20 days and the police can't find her. Every clue seems to vanish, and her father, a wealthy businessman is desperate. A video in which the girl appears living in subhuman conditions is shown in every local news show. The criminals ask for a 1 million dollar ransom, and threaten to cut off parts of Allison's body if her father fails to pay it on time.

Dragon, Mandril and Tony Blades, are the former members of a group called La Gran Sangre, which in other times dedicated to solve similar cases and to defend those who were in need. Separated for many years, each one lives their own life not knowing each other's whereabouts. From different sides of the city the three of them watch the news and feel profound indignation.

Mr. Tamani, convinced that nobody but them can save his daughter, manages to reach Dragon with the hope he will reform La Gran Sangre. After much doubt he decides to fulfill his destiny and accepts, not knowing that reunite his old friends is a task more difficult than he believed and that the girl's kidnapper is no other that Conde, Dragon's mortal enemy whom everybody believed dead after their last encounter, waiting for his bloody revenge.

=== Season Two ===
Raquel, Cobra and Johan are admitted as new official members and the restructured group decide to move in together. As they continue to fight crime in the streets, a series of organized robberies suddenly gets them involved in a big case.

A reckless band of female thieves, Diana, Venus and Medusa, who call themselves "las diosas malditas" (the evil goddesses) are sacking the national heritage. The political and cultural high spheres cannot trust the police. In the middle of the confusion the director of the National Bank proposes that La Gran Sangre take over the case and bring the goddesses to justice.

The case seems simple, but the three criminals would be able to challenge the abilities of La Gran Sangre in an unexpected way. Not only are they young and attractive, but also members of the upper social class of Lima, unknown environment for the heroes.

=== Season Three ===
After the death of Mandril, chaos and uncertainty takes over the members of La Gran Sangre. Raquel, Johan and Cobra try to convince Dragon and Tony to not give up on the team, but both cave in to their pain, and feeling devastated, each one takes his own path.

Meanwhile, Conde has recovered from his defeat and is ready to face his old enemy. To accomplish this he joins efforts with a new force of evil: Gringo, a powerful drug lord who embraces the fight against La Gran Sangre. Alongside him will fight Ming Nao, expert in seduction; Doncella, expert in poisons; and Roble expert in Wrestling. Joining them will also be Seca and Verdes who have been feeding up their rage against La Gran Sangre during their time in jail.

This time the evil gang has the upper hand. La Gran Sangre must overcome their own issues first, in order to defeat the group of merciless villains and survive.

=== Season Four ===
After the defeat of El Conde, peace reigns over the city. However, the heroes go each their separate way, with no plans of getting back together in the near future.

However, peace is quickly threatened by El Mesías (The Messiah), who leads the M.P.S.P. (Movement for the salvation of Perú), a terrorist organization aiming to take over the country. Mandril must reunite with Tony and handle the case on their own, as Dragon has travelled to China and is impossible to reach him. Other villains of the series make their comebacks in this final season.

== Merchandise ==
=== Comics ===
A 10-issue mini-series telling the backstory of La Gran Sangre was released by Capitan Perez Producciones after the end of season one.

=== Soundtrack ===
A soundtrack album featuring music used in the show was released at the same time the first issue of the comics came out. The songs were written and performed specially for the show by various artist many of whom belong to well-known Peruvian rock bands such as La Sarita and D'Mente Comun.

Track listing:

1. "Intro (tema principal)"
2. "Angel, demonio"
3. "Cumbia Pacha"
4. "Ciudad Dormida"
5. "Sueños de papel"
6. "La cosa no sigue mas"
7. "Vida (en esta ciudad)"
8. "Madre"
9. "El solitario"
10. "Malas noticias"
11. "El pacto"
12. "Calles"
13. "Piensa con claridad"
