= Tarring and feathering =

Form of public torture and humiliation

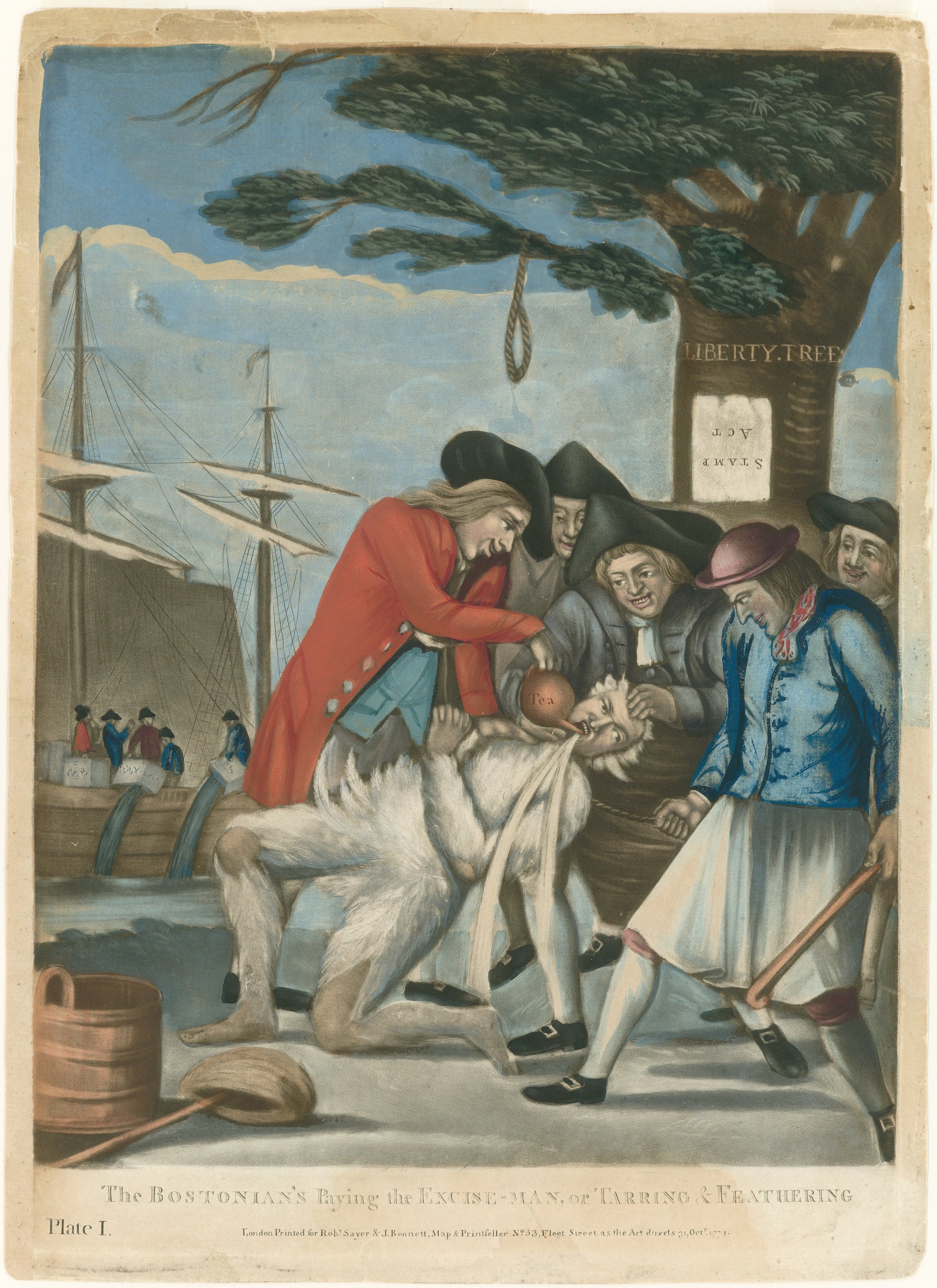
1774 cartoon by Philip Dawe depicting the tarring and feathering of John Malcolm

Tarring and feathering is a form of public torture where a victim is stripped naked (or to the waist), wood tar is either poured or painted onto them, and feathers are thrown on them or they are rolled around on a pile of feathers so that they stick to the tar.

Used primarily as extrajudicial punishment or for revenge, it was used in medieval Europe and its colonies in the early modern period, as well as on the early American frontier, mostly as a form of vigilante justice. The image of a tarred-and-feathered outlaw remains a metaphor for severe public criticism.

Tarring and feathering was a common punishment in the Thirteen Colonies during the American Revolution. The most famous instance of tarring and feathering in the colonies was that of John Malcolm, a Boston customs official who was tarred and feathered by Patriots.

== Early history ==
The earliest mention of the punishment appears in orders that Richard I of England issued to his navy on starting for the Holy Land in 1189. "Concerning the lawes and ordinances appointed by King Richard for his navie the forme thereof was this ... item, a thiefe or felon that hath stolen, being lawfully convicted, shal have his head shorne, and boyling pitch poured upon his head, and feathers or downe strawed upon the same whereby he may be knowen, and so at the first landing-place they shall come to, there to be cast up" (transcript of original statute in Hakluyt's Voyages, ii. 21).

A later instance of this penalty appears in Notes and Queries (series 4, vol. v), which quotes James Howell writing in Madrid in 1623 of the "boisterous Bishop of Halberstadt, a German Protestant military leader ... having taken a place where there were two monasteries of nuns and friars, he caused divers feather beds to be ripped, and all the feathers thrown into a great hall, whither the nuns and friars were thrust naked with their bodies oiled and pitched and to tumble among these feathers, which makes them here (Madrid) presage him an ill-death." (The Bishop was apparently Christian the Younger of Brunswick.)

In 1696, a London bailiff attempted to serve process on a debtor who had taken refuge within the precincts of the Savoy. The bailiff was tarred and feathered and taken in a wheelbarrow to the Strand, where he was tied to a maypole that stood by what is now Somerset House as an improvised pillory.

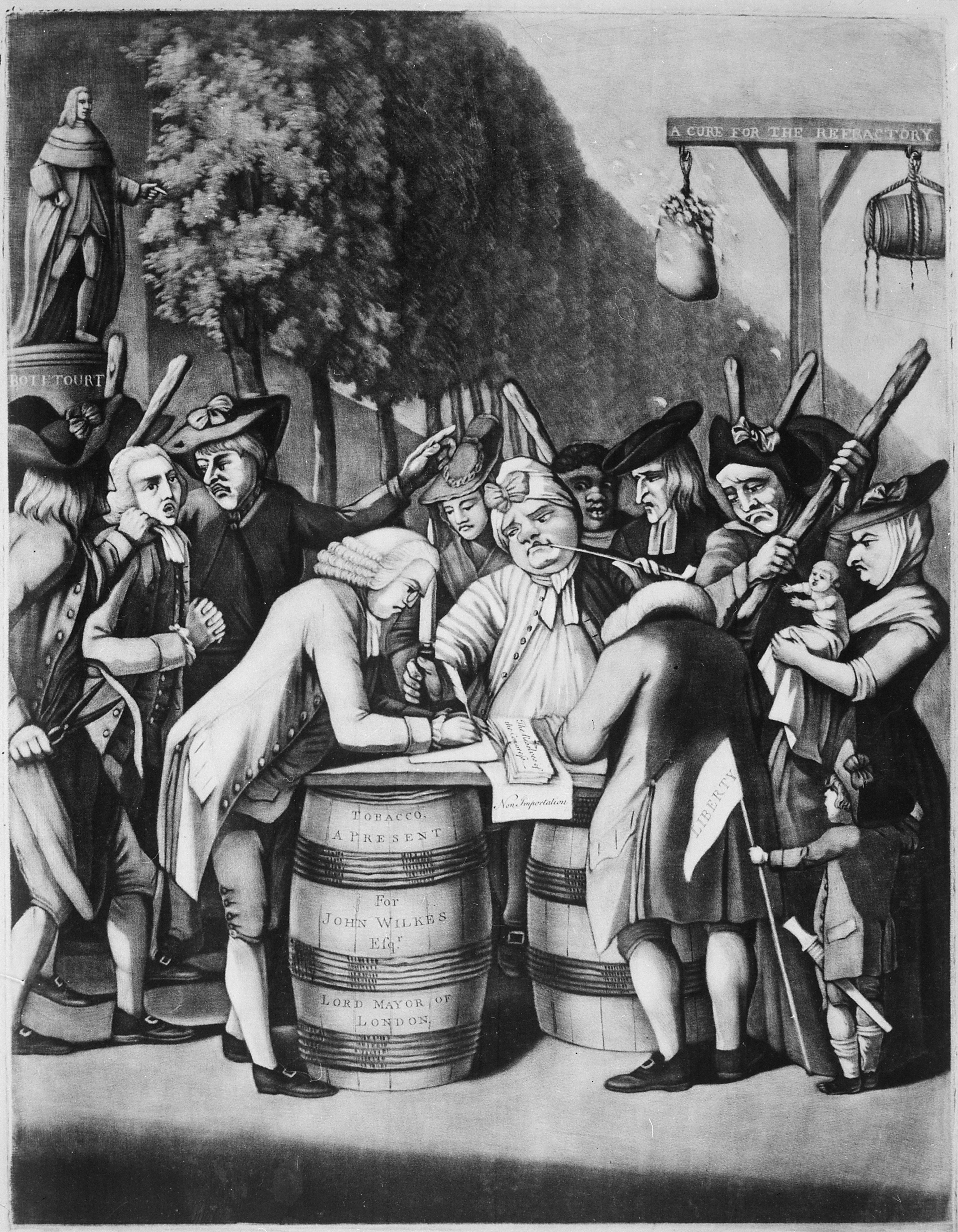
"The Alternative of Williamsburg" – a 1775 British print by Phillip Dawe showing Loyalists being forced to sign either the associations or Resolutions drawn up in Williamsburg in August 1774. The note on gibbet at upper right reads: "A Cure for the Refractory"—a bagful of feathers and a cask of tar.

== 18th-century North America ==
The practice of tarring and feathering was exported to the Americas, gaining popularity in the mid-18th century. Throughout the 1760s it saw increased use as a means of protesting the Townshend Revenue Act and those who sought to enforce it. After a period of few tarrings and featherings between 1770 and 1773, the passage of the Tea Act in May 1773 led to a resurgence of incidents.

During the crisis in the Thirteen Colonies over the Stamp Act 1765, Archibald McCall, a wealthy Loyalist landowner, was targeted by a Patriot mob in Westmoreland and Essex County, Virginia. He insisted on collecting the tax that the Act placed on stamps and other documents. In reaction, a mob formed and stormed his house in Tappahannock, Virginia. They threw rocks through the windows, and McCall was seized, tarred and feathered.

In 1766, Captain J. William Smith was tarred, feathered, and dumped into the harbor of Norfolk, Virginia, by a mob that included the town's mayor. A vessel picked him out of the water just as his strength was giving out. He survived and was later quoted in a letter as saying that they "be-dawbed my body and face all over with tar and afterwards threw feathers on me." Smith was suspected of informing on smugglers to Crown customs official, as was the case with most other tar-and-feathers victims in the following decade.

The practice appeared in Salem, Massachusetts in 1768, when mobs attacked low-level employees of the customs service with tar and feathers. In October 1769, a mob in Boston attacked a customs service sailor the same way, and a few similar attacks followed through 1774. Customs Commissioner John Malcolm was tarred and feathered on two occasions. First, in November 1773, he was targeted by sailors in Portsmouth, New Hampshire, before undergoing a similar, albeit arguably more violent, ordeal in Boston in January 1774. Malcolm was stripped, tarred, feathered, beaten, and whipped for several hours. He was then taken to the Liberty Tree and forced to drink tea until he vomited.

In February 1775, Abner Bebee, a Loyalist of East Haddam, Connecticut, was tarred and feathered before being taken to a hog sty and covered in dung. Hog dung was then smeared in his eyes and forced down his throat. Bebee was subjected to this as a perceived punishment for expressing Loyalist sentiment by his local Committee of Safety.

A particularly violent act of tarring and feathering took place in August 1775 northeast of Augusta, Georgia. Landowner and loyalist Thomas Brown was confronted on his property by members of the Sons of Liberty. After putting up some resistance, Brown was beaten with a rifle, fracturing his skull. He was then stripped and tied to a tree. Hot pitch was poured over him before being set alight, charring two of his toes to stubs. Brown was then feathered by the Sons of Liberty, who then took a knife to his head and began scalping him.

Such acts were often associated with the Patriot side of the American Revolution. An exception occurred in March 1775, when a number of soldiers from the 47th Regiment of Foot tarred and feathered Thomas Ditson, a colonist from Billerica, Massachusetts, who attempted to illegally purchase a musket from one of the regiment's soldiers. Ditson was tarred and feathered before having a placard reading "American Liberty: A Speciment of Democracy" hung around his neck whilst regimental musicians played "Yankee Doodle".

During the Whiskey Rebellion, local farmers inflicted the punishment on federal tax agents. Beginning on September 11, 1791, western Pennsylvania farmers rebelled against the federal government's taxation on western Pennsylvania whiskey distillers. Their first victim was reportedly a recently appointed tax collector named Robert Johnson. He was tarred and feathered by a disguised gang in Washington County. Other officials who attempted to serve court warrants on Johnson's attackers were whipped, tarred, and feathered. Because of these and other violent attacks, the tax went uncollected in 1791 and early 1792. The attackers modeled their actions on the protests of the American Revolution.

== 19th century ==
On June 3, 1826, George Rolph, of Upper Canada was tarred and feathered by supporters of the Tories in what became known as the Ancaster incident.

On March 24, 1832, in Hiram, Ohio, Joseph Smith and Sidney Rigdon were dragged from their homes, beaten, stripped, and tarred and feathered by a mob. The attackers, motivated by opposition to their doctrines, also attempted to poison Smith, leaving him with a lost tooth and chemical burns.

In 1851, Thomas Paul Smith, a 24-year-old African-American from Boston, outspoken in his opposition to school desegregation, was tarred and feathered by a group of African-American Bostonians opposed to segregation.

Also in 1851, a Know-Nothing mob in Ellsworth, Maine, tarred and feathered Swiss-born Jesuit priest, Father John Bapst, in the midst of a local controversy over religious education in grammar schools. Bapst fled Ellsworth to settle in nearby Bangor, Maine, where there was a large Irish-Catholic community, and a local high school there is named for him.

In 1872, schoolteacher Charles G. Kelsey was tarred and feathered for pursuing a young woman from a wealthy family. He was murdered shortly after in mysterious circumstances. His assailants were acquitted of riot and assault and never brought to trial for murder.

== 20th century ==
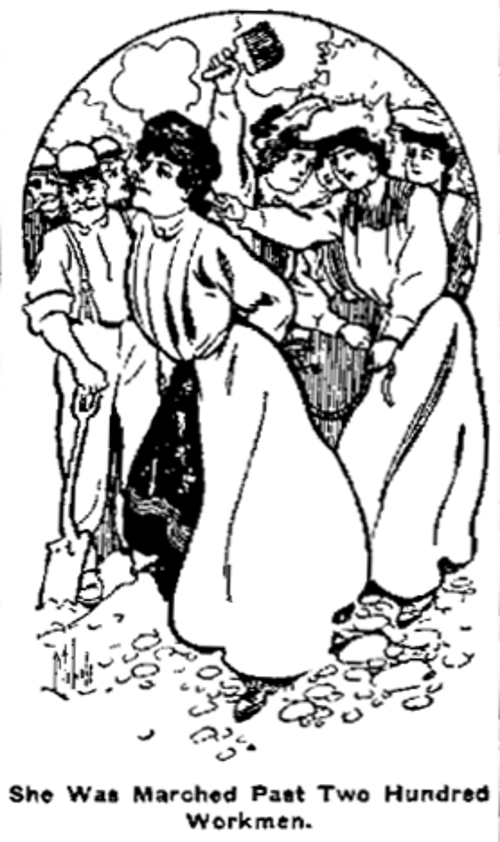
Image accompanying story of "Female Whitecaps Chastise Woman" from the Ada Evening News of November 27, 1906. The article describes an incident in East Sandy, Pennsylvania, where four married women tarred and feathered Mrs. Hattie Lowry.

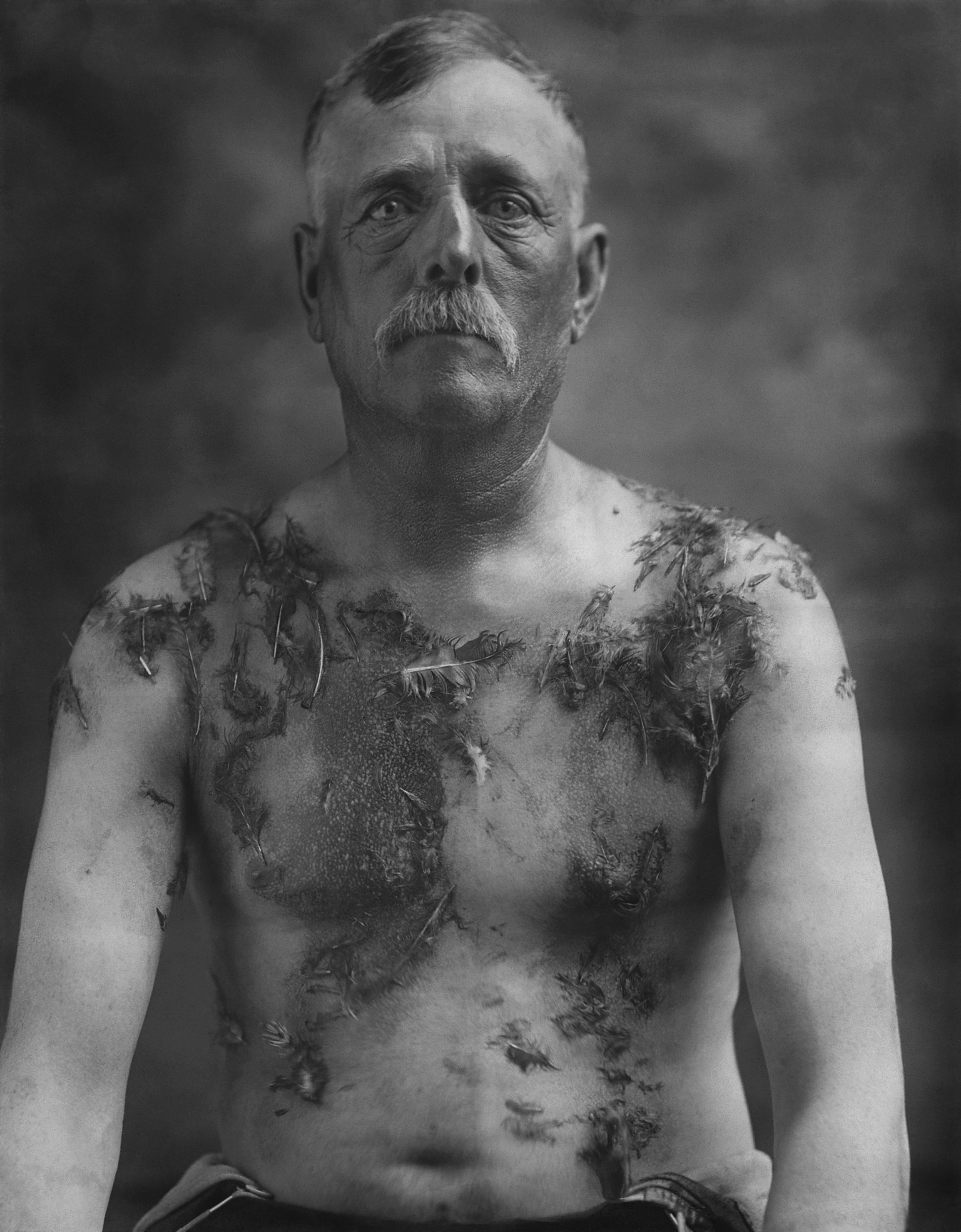
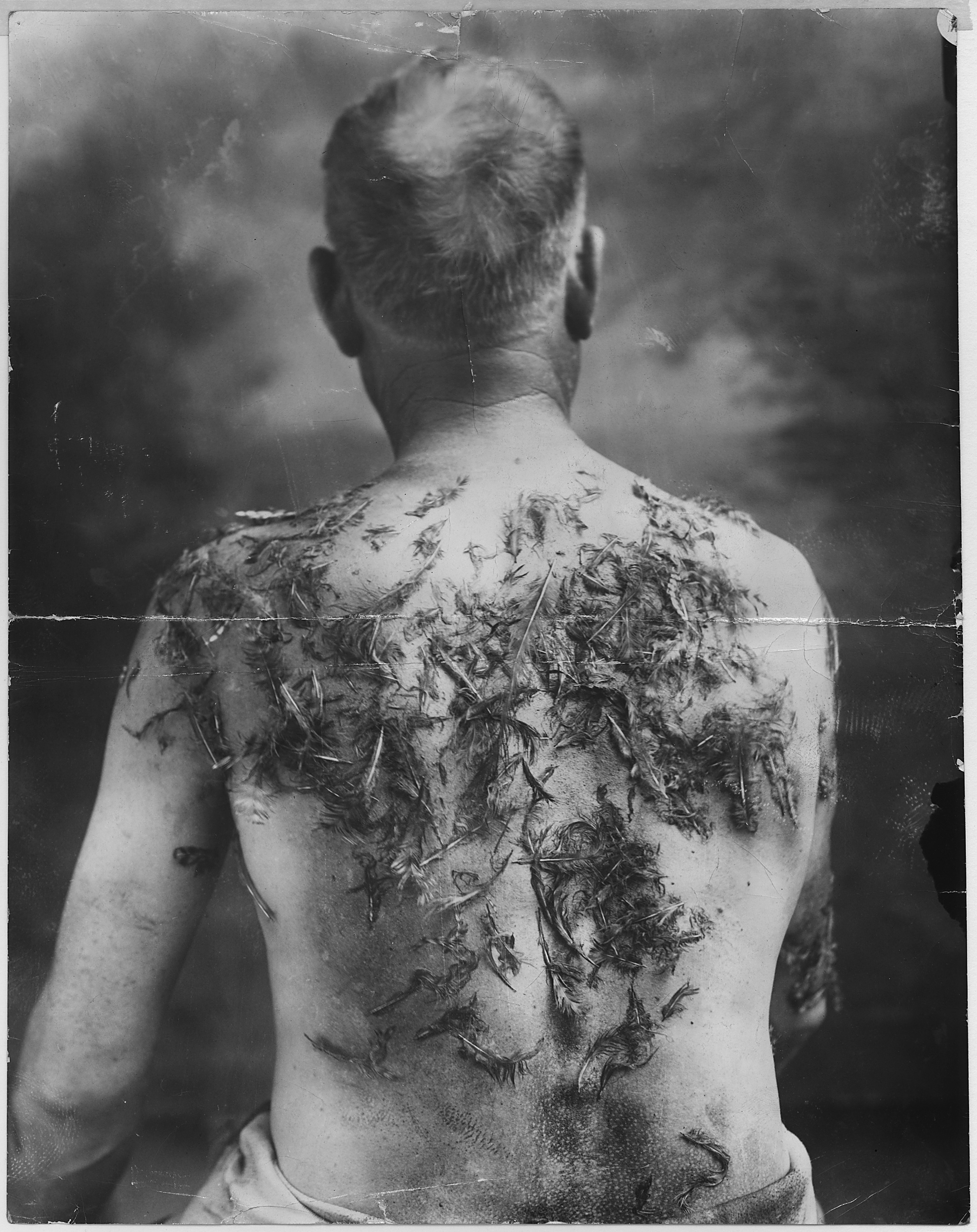
German-American farmer John Meints of Luverne, Minnesota, was tarred and feathered in August 1918 during World War I for allegedly not supporting war bond drives. Minnesotan historians have cited this incident as an example of nativism and anti-German sentiment in Minnesota during World War I.

The November 27, 1906, edition of the Evening News of Ada, Oklahoma, reports that a vigilance committee consisting of four young married women from East Sandy, Pennsylvania, corrected the alleged evil conduct of their neighbor, Mrs. Hattie Lowry, in whitecap style. One of the women was a sister-in-law of the victim. The women appeared at Mrs. Lowry's home in open day and announced that she had not heeded the spokeswoman and leader. Two women held Mrs. Lowry to the floor while the other two smeared her face with stove polish until it was completely covered. They then poured thick molasses upon her head and emptied the contents of a feather pillow over the molasses. The women then marched the victim to a railroad camp, tied by the wrists, where two hundred workmen stopped work to watch the spectacle. After parading Mrs. Lowry through the camp, the women tied her to a large box where she remained until a man released her. Three of the women involved were arrested, pleaded guilty and each paid a $10.00 fine.

In 1912, the American anarchist Ben Reitman was "tarred and sagebrushed" by vigilantes in the aftermath of the San Diego free speech fight. Sagebrush was used because feathers were not available.

There were several examples of tarring and feathering of African Americans in the lead-up to World War I in Vicksburg, Mississippi. According to William Harris, this was a relatively rare form of mob punishment to Republican African-Americans in the post-bellum U.S. South, as its goal was typically pain and humiliation rather than death.

During World War I, anti-German sentiment was widespread in the United States and many German-Americans were attacked. For example, in August 1918 a German-American farmer, John Meints of Luverne, Minnesota, was captured by a group of men, taken to the nearby South Dakota border and tarred and feathered—for allegedly not supporting war bonds. Meints sued his assailants and lost, but on appeal to a federal court he won, and in 1922 settled out of court for $6,000. In March 1922, a German-born Catholic priest in Slaton, Texas, Joseph M. Keller, who had been harassed by local residents during World War I due to his ethnicity, was accused of breaking the seal of confession and tarred and feathered. Thereafter Keller served a Catholic parish in Milwaukee, Wisconsin.

Future Australian senator Fred Katz – a socialist and anti-conscriptionist of German parentage – was publicly tarred and feathered outside his office in Melbourne in December 1915. A week before the 1919 Australian federal election, former Labor MP John McDougall was kidnapped by a group of about 20 ex-soldiers in Ararat, Victoria, and subsequently tarred and feathered before being dumped in the town's streets. He had earlier been revealed as the author of an anti-war poem that was perceived as insulting Australia's soldiers. Six men were charged with inflicting grievous bodily harm, but pleaded down to common assault and were fined £5 each. Many newspapers supported their actions.

A group of black-robed Knights of Liberty – a faction of the Ku Klux Klan – tarred and feathered seventeen members of the Industrial Workers of the World (IWW) in Oklahoma in 1917, during an incident known as the Tulsa Outrage. They claimed responsibility for a number of other tarring and feathering incidents over the next year in Oklahoma, the Midwest, and California. In the 1920s, vigilantes were opposed to IWW organizers at California's harbor of San Pedro. They kidnapped at least one organizer, subjected him to tarring and feathering, and left him in a remote location.

The edition of the Miami Daily News-Record (Miami, Oklahoma) for Wednesday, May 28, 1930, contains on its front page the arrests of five brothers (Isaac, Newton, Henry, Gordon and Charles Starns) from Louisiana accused of tarring and feathering S. L. Newsome, who was a prominent dentist. This was in retaliation for the dentist having an affair with one of the brother's wives.

Similar tactics were also used by the Provisional Irish Republican Army (IRA) during the early years of the Troubles. Many of the victims were women accused of being in romantic relationships with policemen or British soldiers.

Robert E. Miles, a white supremacist theologist and Grand Dragon of the Michigan Ku Klux Klan, received a 4-year sentence for the 1971 tarring and feathering of a school official.

== 21st century ==
In August 2007, loyalist groups in Northern Ireland were linked to the tarring and feathering of an individual accused of drug-dealing.

In June 2020, multiple graves and memorials to Confederate soldiers at Crown Hill Cemetery in Indianapolis, Indiana, were tarred and feathered as a part of the George Floyd protests.

== In popular culture ==
Tarring and feathering has been commonly referenced in historic and contemporary popular culture, particularly in the United States.

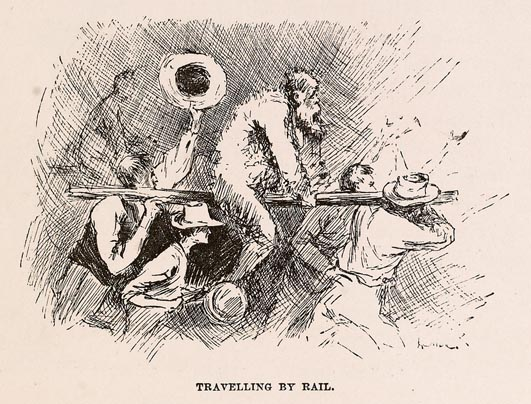
A fictional depiction of this practice in Mark Twain's 1884 novel Adventures of Huckleberry Finn

=== Literature ===
The use of tar and pitch in punishments appearing in such medieval works as Anglo-Norman sermons, The Purgatory of Saint Patrick by Marie de France and Dante's Inferno have been seen as precursors for the idea of tarring and feathering. The latter also features the element of feathers when a "human thief is painfully transformed into a grotesque simulacrum of nature's thief, the magpie".

==== North America ====
The punitive social ritual of tarring and feathering has appeared in numerous American works of both "canonical literature and dime novels", even as the actual practice became less frequent, "dramatizing debates between summary punishment on the one hand, and individual rights on the other". This outward blackening by tar was generally equated with blackness of character, which again was linked to racist notions of the inferiority of black-skinned slaves, while the feathers were sometimes regarded as "nodding to [American-]Indian headdresses". "John Trumbull, James Fenimore Cooper, Nathaniel Hawthorne, and Edgar Allan Poe, among numerous others, draw on tarring and feathering to portray anxieties about the "experiment" of democracy in which egalitarian alignment of society yielded a racialized social opprobrium." The earliest representations in literature were in the context of the American Revolution, in a poem by Philip Freneau and in John Trumbull's M'Fingal from 1776, which in its literary form of "the mockepic genre [...] resonated with the euphemistic, tongue-in-cheek language used in newspapers". This background reappeared in Jimmy Carter's 2003 novel The Hornet's Nest, which features a "stunning" scene with the tarring and feathering of loyalist Thomas Brown. The torture was presented as the pivotal event for the radicalization of that character.

James Fenimore Cooper's Redskins from 1846 presented the act of tarring and feathering in the context of the Anti-Rent War as the "unwarranted, imbalanced threat of violence from misguided, irrational, and selfinterested crowds". In the works of Nathaniel Hawthorne, tarring and feathering appeared as problematic side-effect of democracy and nationalism in the United States of America of his time, progressing from a symbolic regicide in the American Revolution to fratricide. In "My Kinsman, Major Molineux" (1831), Robin, the nephew of the eponymous character, seeks him in vain throughout the story. Finally, Robin sees the Major taken by in a procession, tarred and feathered, having fallen out of the favour of his community. Here Hawthorne examined the effect this punishment has on the "community after engaging in such a brutal act", while he used it as "a metaphor of persecution and victimization" in "Old News: The Old Tory" (1837) and "The Custom-House", the introduction to The Scarlet Letter (1850). In Doctor Grimshawe's Secret (1882) Hawthorne puts both perspectives together "as characters alternate between victims and perpetrators with each passing moment". In the stories "The Liberty Tree" and "Tory's Farewell" from the collection Grandfather's Chair (1842), Hawthorne shows tarring and feathering as a sign of "mob mentality that dismisses common sense" and is unwarranted as a means of political and social dispute.

"Dramatizations of the ritual in antebellum literature reveal the deep political and psychological anxieties about the use of violent social coercion to establish the always shifting class and racial boundaries of U.S. nationalism." Edgar Allan Poe's humorous short story, "The System of Doctor Tarr and Professor Fether" (1845), featured the staff of an insane asylum being tarred and feathered as a means of torture. In his short story "Hop-Frog; Or Eight Chained Ourang-Outangs" (1849) appeared the "image of the tarred and feathered body as ape", which "for Poe, is the embodiment of white terror associated with the chaos of rioting and insurrection." Both stories are written against the background of the abolitionism debate, and the tarring and feathering is also seen as the outward sign of a "power inversion", which can be related for Poe's society both to the relationship of slave and master, as well as abolitionists and anti-abolitionists. Psychiatric history researcher Wendy Gonaver assumed that "Tarr and Fether" "mocks the conceit that bourgeois liberalism can contain the violent madness of revolution". The story was very loosely adapted by The Alan Parsons Project into the song "(The System of) Dr. Tarr and Professor Fether" on the Tales of Mystery and Imagination album. A more racialized context, where tar is used to blacken the skin against abolitionists and sympathizers "to correspond to the purported color of the slaves they were trying to free" is prevalent in the atmosphere preceding the American Civil War. This was reflected in literary works like Harriet Beecher-Stowe's novel Dred from 1856 and Rose Mather (1868) by Mary Jane Holmes.

The Adventures of Huckleberry Finn (1885) by Mark Twain "perhaps more than any other literary work, immortalized the punishment": the King and the Duke are tarred, feathered, and ridden on a rail after performing the Royal Nonesuch to a crowd that Jim had warned about the rapscallions. Twain points out the dehumanizing effect of the ritual and "that even those who deserve blame do not warrant punishment outside the law". In 1958 the social punishment appears as a humorous element in James Thurber's modern fable "What Happened To Charles": the duck Eva, who eavesdrops on every conversation she hears but never gets anything quite right, is ironically tarred and un-feathered, i.e. plucked, after she mistakes "shod" (having shoes put on) for "shot" and spreads the rumor that the horse Charles has been killed (he turns up alive and wearing new horseshoes). In Philip Roth's 2004 alternate history novel The Plot Against America, the 8-year-old protagonist has a daydreaming fear of himself and his family being tarred and feathered. Here this "antiquated punishment from Western mythology" symbolizes the humiliation the Jewish family suffers in a climate of antisemitism. In Anne Cameron's The Journey (1982) it is an example of misogyny in the American West.

Scholar of American literature Marina Trininc observed in 2013 that tarring and feathering has also appeared in recent American novels against the background of terroristic attacks in the US and worldwide.

==== Europe ====
Tarring and feathering in North America was reported and discussed in many British newspapers in the 1770s, often in an exaggerating manner, emphasizing different sensibilites between the two populations and denigrating North American attitudes, while a majority of American newspapers presented such acts in a sympathetic and euphemistic way. Charles Dickens satirized this tone of the latter in Martin Chuzzlewit (1842–1844) in the figure of Mr. Chollop: This American was an "advocate of Lynch law, and slavery; and invariably recommended, both in print and speech, the "tarring and feathering" of any unpopular person who differed from himself" and "was much esteemed for his devotion to rational Liberty".

In Northern Irish literature, "[t]arring and feathering women who are accused of dating males of the other community (especially British soldiers) are a common topos". A graphic depiction of the practice occurs in Robert McLiam Wilson's 1989 novel Ripley Bogle, where in West Belfast a woman made pregnant by a corporal of the Royal Engineers is punished. Seamus Heaney's 1975 poem "Punishment" juxtaposes the tarring and feathering of Catholic women who fraternized with British soldiers with the punishment of Iron Age bog body the Windeby Girl (since revealed to be a man) who was at the time thought to have been punished for infidelity, suggesting that the punishment meted to women in Northern Ireland is very much rooted in ancient tribal traditions. This connection has been criticized by scholar of English literature Richard Danson Brown as "sloppy thinking" which removes the modern punitive ritual from the political realm. In Eoin McNamee's novel Resurrection Man (1994), both sides of the Northern Ireland conflict are shown employing these "ritual punishments for consorting with the enemy", emphasizing the Troubles "as a period of the destabilization of ethical norms".

In fairy tales tarring and feathering is only rarely found, but it appears in a number of droll stories (most prevalent in Northern and Eastern Europe) after the middle of the 19th century. The character types "klutz at housework", "dumb woman", and "unwanted male suitor" — all caricatures of human weaknesses — are ridiculed by tarring and feathering. Sometimes the function of tar and feathers is replaced by other substances like eggs and bran, or by being put into fool's motley. In some stories tarred and feathered characters are misrepresented or mistaken for an unknown animal or the devil, and sometimes do not even recognize themselves. In a few cases tarring and feathering is done deliberately as part of a ruse.

=== Comics ===
The punishment of tarring and feathering in the American Old West has been "forever more given to posterity in comics". It is used in ironic fashion in the comic series Lucky Luke, where a number of antagonists, usually cardsharps and swindlers, are shown tarred and feathered. In Don Rosa's The Terror of the Transvaal (1993), the sixth chapter of The Life and Times of Scrooge McDuck, syrup and feathers are used to punish a treacherous thief.

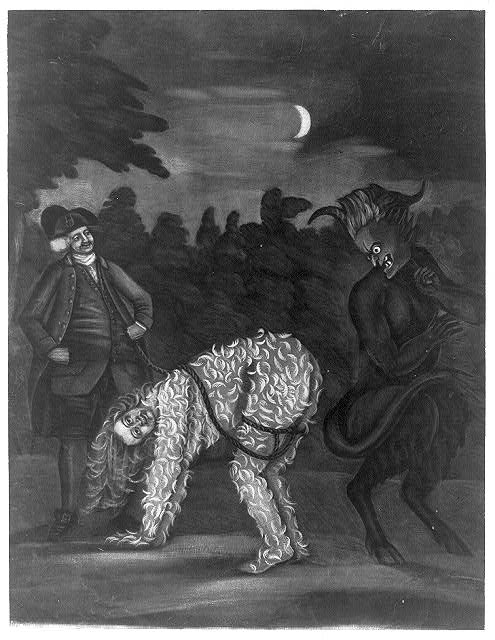
British satirical mezzotint print of a tarred and feathered man (1770)

=== Art ===
In the 1770s, when tarring and feathering was perceived as a novelty and became increasingly frequent in British America, a number of prints showing this punishment were published in England. According to historian Barry Levy these pictures both catered to a sense of thrill, as well as anti-American sentiments. One mezzotint from 1775 also depicted women - "probably seductively and fearfully pornographic," being tarred and feathered before any such a case was actually recorded. Marina Trininc remarked that English prints emphasized the feathers, as e.g. geese symbolized "weak intellects and moral unnaturalness", while the "racialized dimensions of this punishment", the association of the tar with black skin, "were lost in translation across the shores".

The neo-expressionist painter Jean-Michel Basquiat exhibited the paintings Black Tar and Feathers, and Untitled (Yellow Tar and Feathers) in 1982, the later a painting that scholar Fred Hoffman interprets as containing "young black heroic figures" and speaking of "a rising above the pain, suffering and degradation associated with the act of being 'tarred and feathered'". In the view of art historian Leonard Emmering, the "blackness of tar is [...] associated with Basquiat's skin color", and his Tar and Feathers painting "refers to the racist practice of tarring and feathering black men."

=== On stage ===
Tarring and feathering appeared in several English plays in the 1770s as a novel element used in "a satirical and comedic context". The appearance of a victim of the punishment was also used as a costume in a masked ball and other public appearances of that time. Much later, in Meredith Willson's musical The Music Man (1957), tarring and feathering is demanded as punishment of the main character Harold Hill, con man and Trickster figure, for his scam.

=== Television and film ===
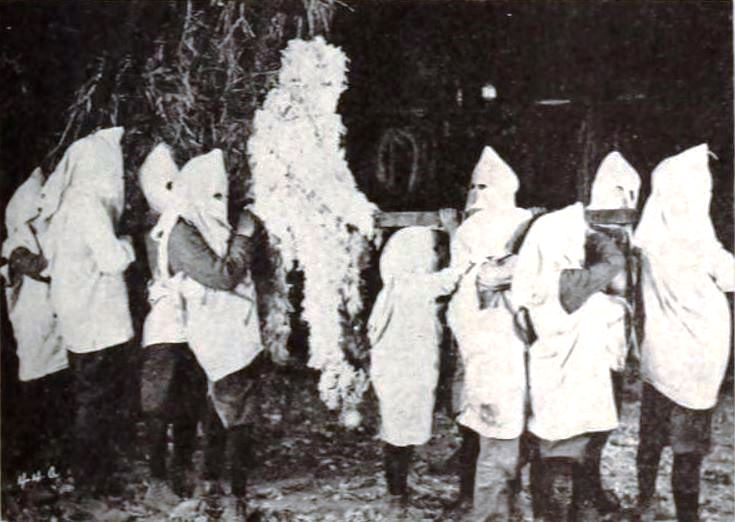
A victim of tarring and feathering depicted in American short film Mother's Angel (1920)

Tarring and feathering has been depicted in television and film in different functions, for drastic effect, realistically, or in a humorous manner: In the 1972 John Waters "trash cinema" film Pink Flamingos, Connie and Raymond Marbles (played by Mink Stole and David Lochary), are tarred and feathered. Here this act of retribution for a series of misdeeds against the film's protagonist, Babs Johnson (Divine), is one of the signs showing her "defiance of feminine cultural norms". The episode "Join or Die" of 2008 HBO miniseries John Adams has Adams witnessing an angry Boston mob tarring and feathering a Crown tax official. While effective as a "chilling portrayal" of the procedure, the situation around it is historically inaccurate. In American Horror Story: Freak Show episode 8 "Blood Bath" (2014), The Lizard Girl's father is tarred and feathered in retaliation for his role in his daughter's intentional disfigurement. This is presented as a both gruesome and satisfying act of retribution. In the film Revenge of the Nerds (1984) characters Lewis Skolnick and Gilbert Lowe are tarred and feathered by the Alpha Betas in response to their attempt to seek admittance to the fraternity. Despite the overall funny tone of the movie, the scene connects to "a public form of humiliation used throughout history", "a sort of lynch mob mentality" directed against the minority, here the eponymous nerds. In the episode "The Gang Cracks the Liberty Bell" (2008) of the television series It's Always Sunny In Philadelphia, Mac and Dennis, while dressed as British fops, are tarred and feathered by characters dressed as American colonists in light-hearted "hilarious scenes".

A number of the depictions on screen refer to the era of the American Wild West, some in a mythologizing and some in a more realistic manner. In the film Little Big Man (1970), adapted from the 1964 novel by Thomas Berger, con man Meriweather, played by Martin Balsam, and title character Jack Crabbe, played by Dustin Hoffman, are shown being tarred and feathered for selling a phony medicinal elixir. The cruel procedure is used as a tragicomic element illustrating this "revisionist retelling of the Wild West saga", as the leader of the perpetrating mob turns out to be Jack's long lost sister. In Daniel Knauf's Carnivàle, in an episode called "Lincoln Highway" (2005), Clayton "Jonesy" Jones, the crippled co-manager, is tarred and feathered almost lethally. The procedure here is presented as a deserved punishment for the accidental death of several children at the Ferris wheel under Jonsey's responsibility. While anachronistic for the 1930s setting, it is one of a number of references to the American frontier. Similarly, the 2012 film Lawless, set in the 1930s, has been considered a "Western-gangster film hybrid". A bootlegger being tarred and feathered was one of the violent images that shaped the impression that the film made. In an episode of the Deadwood TV series, African-American character Samuel Fields is tarred and feathered in a racist "eruption of mob violence that acts to express and purge the anger of the town's whites" in scenes clearly depicting the horror of the procedure. The season 1 episode "God of Chaos" (2011) one of the AMC TV series Hell on Wheels, a character, The Swede, is depicted being tarred and feathered before getting run out of town.

In animation, tarring and feathering has been used for comic effect with no serious or lasting impact on the characters. In the Road Runner and Wile E. Coyote short film, Guided Muscle (1955), Coyote tries to apply a tar-and-feather machine to Road Runner, who already has feathers. As usual in these cartoons, Coyote becomes the victim of his backfiring plan, but is humiliated rather than seriously harmed by the procedure. In the TV series The Simpsons, characters are tarred and feathered in several episodes as dark humour. For Bart Simpson as a perpetrator, Divya Carolyn McMillin cited the procedure as an example of a character who "was unapologetic and acted on impulse", making him appealing to youths, which was possible in animation, in contrast to real life, as no consequences for Bart were shown.

Marina Trininc observed in 2013 that tarring and feathering has appeared in recent American films and series against the backdrop of terroristic attacks in the US and worldwide.

=== Video games ===
In the video game Curse of Monkey Island, Guybrush Threepwood is tarred and feathered by monkey crew members of a pirate ship, treating the procedure in a less-than-serious manner. He later uses this to pose as El Pollo Diablo, a giant chicken who has terrorized the area.

=== Music ===
Tarring and feathering appeared as a topic in music already in the 18th century: A verse from an early (British) version of "Yankee Doodle" relates to an incident involving a "Yankee" Minuteman named Thomas Ditson of Billerica, Massachusetts:

Yankee Doodle came to town,
For to buy a firelock,
We will tar and feather him,
And so we will John Hancock.

More recently it has been used in the title of several works: The second track of the cult British Indie band Cardiacs 1987 Mini LP Big Ship was titled "Tarred and Feathered". The music video for this song was infamously played on Channel 4's The Tube, and was remarked for the song's unusual nature and the band's unusual visual appeal. The 2010 EP from The Hives is called Tarred and Feathered. The 2005 album Gutter Phenomenon by metal band Every Time I Die contains an "explosive" song punningly titled "Guitarred and Feathered".

Tarring and feathering is featured within the lyrics of songs such as in the Merle Haggard hit "(My Friends Are Gonna Be) Strangers" (1964). In lyrics by Liz Anderson, there is a line saying he "should be taken out, tarred and feathered" for his foolishness of trusting the woman who would betray and leave him. Haggard's biographer David Cantwell found that the performance influenced how this image was perceived: In a version by Roy Drusky it comes off "as self-effacing", but when "Haggard sings the line, it's as if he's identifying exactly the punishment he deserves." To be tarred and feathered is mentioned in the chorus of the song "To Kingdom Come", from The Band's album Music from Big Pink (1968), as one of the fates to be feared. The 1996 R.E.M. song "Be Mine" contains the lyric "I'll ply the tar out of your feathers," purportedly a reference to tarring and feathering. In satirist Tom Lehrer's album An Evening Wasted with Tom Lehrer (1959), his introduction to the song We Will All Go Together When We Go mentions an acquaintance of his who was "financially independent having inherited his father's tar-and-feather business".

Depicting artists being tarred and feathered has also been used as a means of promoting music: The avant-garde electronic music artist Fad Gadget (Frank Tovey) often performed on stage while tarred and feathered. He was photographed in tar and feathers for the cover of his album Gag (1984). Artist Martynka Wawrzyniak described the function of this device as allowing "you to step outside of your comfort zone and do something different". Tovey himself "interpreted the shock value of his presentations as 'commercial suicide'" as they were "challenging, or degrading to the pop star ideal". Popular music scholar Giuseppe Zevolli saw this as the artist "exploring the link between his role as a performer and the power of media to influence their audiences." The Hives band members were likewise depicted on the album cover of Tarred and Feathered, presented in newspaper style, and subtitled "Cheating with other people's songs!", as the EP contained only songs covered from other artists.

=== Metaphorical uses ===
The image of the tarred-and-feathered outlaw remains a metaphor for public humiliation many years after the practice had become uncommon, such as in this example from Dark Summer by Iris Johansen: "But you'd tar and feather me if I made the wrong decision for these guys." Perhaps the earliest instance of such metaphorical use appears in a letter by Benjamin Franklin from 1778.

In more recent years, tarring and feathering can refer to cancel culture, or mass vendetta campaigns on social media.

=== Influence ===
Archaeologist Rainer Atzbach assumed that the public awareness of tarring and feathering has contributed to another legend present in popular culture, the use of hot tar and pitch as a defensive weapon in medieval castles.

== See also ==
- Category:Tarring and feathering in the United States
- Charivari – Folk custom shaming a community member
- Extrajudicial punishment – Punishment carried out without legal processes or a trial
- Public humiliation – Form of punishment whose main feature is dishonoring or disgracing a person
- Riding the rail – Punishment mostly prevalent in the United States
- Vigilante – Act of preventing and punishing crimes without legal authority
