= Punishment (poem) =

Poem by Seamus Heaney

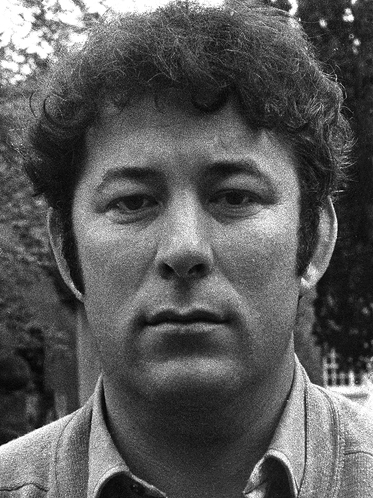
Seamus Heaney in 1970

"Punishment" is a poem by Irish poet Seamus Heaney first published in his 1975 collection North. It, along with "Bog Queen", "The Grauballe Man", "Strange Fruit" and "The Tollund Man", is inspired by P.V. Glob's book, The Bog People. "Punishment" highlights similarities between Europe's ancient past and The Troubles in Northern Ireland.

== Inspiration ==
The inspiration for the bog-body poems came after Heaney read the book The Bog People by P.V. Glob, a 1965 archeological study of bodies that were preserved in the bogs of Northern Europe. He published the first such poem, "The Tollund Man", in his 1972 collection Wintering Out. Heaney elaborated on this inspiration in his essay "Feeling Into Words", stating that "the unforgettable photographs of these victims blended in my mind with photographs of atrocities, past and present, in the long rites of Irish political and religious struggles".

== Analysis ==
The poem is made up of eleven stanzas with four lines each. The first two stanzas consist of Heaney describing how he imagines the woman might have looked just prior to her execution for adultery. He then describes what the body looks like now, after preservation in the bog. The final six stanzas explore the speaker's voyeuristic relationship with the condemned and laments that, although they "would connive/ in civilized outrage", they would "understand the exact/ and tribal, intimate revenge."

Mary P. Brown, a lecturer at the New University of Ulster, found Heaney's conflicted emotions to represent an indictment of art itself, writing that, "Heaney's self accusation in the last four stanzas of the poem is directed at both the man and the poet. The poem has been bought at the expense of action: art stands accused." Stephanie Alexander recognizes a theme of violence and complicity that remains constant across time, writing that, "the bog has become an uncanny reflection of contemporary life, an archive that houses both the past and present, and the narrator seems helpless but to do anything but reenact the violence again". Some critics responded negatively to this association between past and present violence. Ciaran Carson accused Heaney of becoming "the laureate of violence--a mythmaker, an anthropologist of ritual killing, an apologist for 'the situation,' in the last resort, a mystifier".

== The Troubles ==
The lines, "I who have stood dumb/ when your betraying sisters,/ cauled in tar,/ wept by the railings," draw a connection between the past and the conflict in Northern Ireland contemporary to when the poem was written. During the Troubles, the Irish Republican Army (IRA) was known to have used tarring and feathering as a way to punish Irish women who were involved with British soldiers.
