= The Most Feared Skin =

2023 film by Joel Calero

- Theatrical release poster
- Directed by: Joel Calero
- Written by: Joel Calero
- Produced by: Joel Calero
- Starring: Juana Burga
- Cinematography: Llano ABC
- Edited by: Roberto Benavides
- Production companies: Factoría Sur Producciones SRL; Bhakti Films SAS
- Release dates: August 13, 2023 (Lima); April 25, 2024 (Peru)
- Running time: 121 minutes
- Countries: Peru; Colombia
- Language: Spanish

The Most Feared Skin (Spanish: La piel más temida), also known as The Punishment, is a 2023 drama film written, produced and directed by Joel Calero. It stars Juana Burga accompanied by Amiel Cayo, Lucho Cáceres, María Luque and Katerina D'Onofrio. It is the second film in the Calero's memory trilogy, following One Last Afternoon (2016), and preceding Family Album (2024).

== Synopsis ==
Alejandra returns to Cusco to sell her family’s colonial house, but discovers her father is alive and imprisoned for his ties to the Shining Path, leading her to reconnect with her past.

== Cast ==
- Juana Burga as Alejandra
- Amiel Cayo as Victor
- Lucho Cáceres as Américo
- María Luque as Dominga
- Katerina D'Onofrio

== Production ==
Principal photography was scheduled to begin in May 2020, but was delayed due to the COVID-19 pandemic. Filming lasted a month and a half in Andahuaylillas, Maras, Anta, Tocto and Cusco, Peru.

== Release ==
The Most Feared Skin had its world premiere on August 13, 2023, in Galas section at the 27th Lima Film Festival. Its commercial premiere is scheduled for April 25, 2024, in Peruvian theaters.

== Accolades ==
Year	Award / Festival	Category	Recipient	Result	Ref.
2024	15th APRECI Awards	Best Supporting Actress	María Luque	Won	
2024	11th Trujillo Film Festival	Best Fiction Feature Film	The Most Feared Skin	Nominated	
2024	11th Trujillo Film Festival	Best Fiction Feature Film - Honorable Mention	The Most Feared Skin	Won	
2024	11th Trujillo Film Festival	APRECI Jury Awards - Best Film	The Most Feared Skin	Won	
2024	39th Trieste Ibero-Latin American Cinema Festival	Special Jury Prize of the Official Section	The Most Feared Skin	Won	
