= George Rolph =

Upper Canadian politician and lawyer (1794–1875)

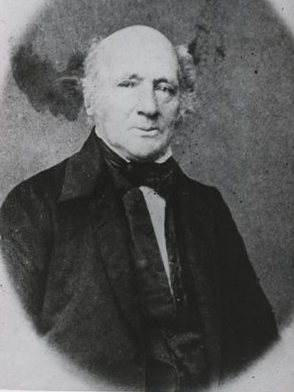
- Rolph, unknown date
- Born: 7 April 1794; Thornbury, Gloucestershire, England
- Died: 25 July 1875 (aged 81); Dundas, Ontario, Canada
- Occupation: Lawyer

George Rolph (7 April 1794 – 25 July 1875) was a lieutenant, lawyer, government official and politician in Upper Canada. Born in England, he immigrated to Canada in 1811, eventually settling in Upper Canada. During the War of 1812 he was a lieutenant of the 1st Regiment Norfolk Militia and participated in the Battle of Fort Detroit, for which he was awarded a gold medal for outstanding service. After the war, Rolph became a lawyer in Dundas, Upper Canada, and was appointed to various government roles.

In 1826, members of the ruling elite tarred and feathered him, motivated by Rolph's lack of nepotism for the group. He successfully sued two members of the group in a civil lawsuit; he appealed this decision, stating that others should also have to pay him for the incident, but was unsuccessful. In 1828 he was elected to the Legislative Assembly of Upper Canada, representing Halton County. The Upper Canadian lieutenant governor dismissed Rolph from his role as clerk for Gore county court upon recommendation from the court's magistrates, citing five accusations of misconduct. After an inquiry from the legislative assembly, Rolph was reinstated into the role.

In 1829 Rolph began acquiring the law practice of his brother John Rolph and the following year was unsuccessful in his reelection to the legislative assembly. In 1835, he opposed the incorporation of Dundas as a village, stating that donations from local citizens were enough to fund the area's government services. Upon his death in 1875, he donated a portion of his estate to become a city park. Rolph Street in Hamilton, Ontario, is named for him.

== Early life ==
George was born on 7 April 1794, in Thornbury, Gloucestershire. His parents were Thomas Rolph and Frances Petty. Rolph's parents emigrated to Canada in 1811 and brought Rolph, his brother Thomas Jr. and her sister Mary Ann with them. The family settled in homesteads in Les Cèdres near Montreal, Lower Canada. Friends of his father described the possibility of better homesteads in Upper Canada, so his father bought land in Charlotteville and moved the family there to manage a farm.

== War of 1812 ==
Upon the outbreak of the War of 1812, Rolph joined the newly formed 1st Regiment Norfolk Militia and was appointed as a lieutenant. In July 1812, British Major-General Isaac Brock brought reinforcements to besiege Fort Detroit, including the Norfolk militia. To convince the fort's commander, American Brigadier General William Hull, that there were several thousand troops ready to attack it, Brock had his regiments perform drills several times daily. When Hull surrendered, Brock presented Rolph with a gold medal for outstanding service during the siege. Rolph also participated in the Battle of Queenston Heights in October 1812 and the Battle of Stoney Creek in June 1813.

Rolph remained with the 1st Norfolk regiment through 1814. He participated in the Battle of Lundy's Lane. After the war, Rolph was nominated to receive an Upper Canada Preserved Medal for his war service; none of the nominees were successful because the awarding judges could not agree on who should receive the medals.

== Law career and incident ==
After the war, George took law classes at Osgoode Hall in York, Upper Canada. He was called to the Bar of Upper Canada in 1816 and moved to Dundas, bringing his mother to live with him. At that time, he was the second-largest landowner of the town. His family's connection to a prominent government official named Thomas Talbot allowed him to be appointed to the roles of clerk of the peace (the first person appointed to this position), registrar of the surrogate court, and clerk of the court for Gore county in 1816. Rolph practiced law throughout the Hamilton and Ancaster region. In 1823, Rolph was appointed as captain of the 1st Regiment Gore militia.

Rolph did not associate himself with members of the region's aristocratic elite, refusing to attend galas or give toasts at public dinners. This caused the elite to become hostile towards Rolph as he did not use his position to support their causes. Rolph gave asylum to a woman named Mrs. Evans, who was fleeing her abusive husband. Rumours spread that Rolph was committing adultery with Evans, even though Evans was living in a different part of the house. In June 1826 a group of men invaded his home at night, dragged him outside, and tarred and feathered him. Six were accused of being in the mob during the incident: George Gurnett, Titus Simons, James Hamilton, Alexander Robertson, Allan MacNab, and Alexander Chewett.

His brother, John Rolph, agreed to represent George in a trial against the assailants. John suggested that they wait before laying charges, and the accused bragged to members of the community about being the assailants. Rolph used this information to begin a civic action against the assailants in August 1827, suing for £1000 each. At the trial, the defence stated that the crime was intended to inform George Rolph of the community's opinion on his supposed adultery with Evans. The jury's verdict was for Simons and Hamilton to pay £20 each in damages.

== Political career ==
George was elected to the Legislative Assembly of Upper Canada. He was reelected in 1828, representing Halton County. The Gore county magistrates suspended Rolph from his role as their clerk and recommended that Maitland make the suspension permanent, which Maitland refused to do. In April 1829 the magistrates voted to remove Rolph from the role permanently, giving five accusations of misconduct including his insistence to only speak to the magistrate through his attorney. The new lieutenant governor of Upper Canada, John Colbourne, affirmed the dismissal. The legislative assembly conducted an inquiry into this event and determined that the magistrates acted improperly and recommended Rolph's reappointment to the role.

In 1829, Rolph's brother John began to focus on his medical career and gave most of his cases to Rolph; the two operated law offices in Vittoria and Ancaster and were the largest law practice west of York. Rolph was not reelected in the 1830 elections to Upper Canada's legislative assembly. By 1832, Rolph acquired the totality of his brother's law practice.

In 1835, people in Dundas proposed incorporating the village, giving elected officials the ability to tax the inhabitants for public services. Rolph led the opposition against this scheme. He stated that the elected body was unnecessary because the townspeople already had other capabilities to fund services and that they could be managed by volunteers instead of paid individuals. Rolph's opposition decreased his reputation in the community because he was benefiting from services funded by donations from others who were less financially successful; those in favour of the incorporation felt landowners such as Rolph should be compelled to contribute more financially for public services.

== Personal life ==
Rolph married Georgianna Clement in 1836 in Wales. They had two daughters. Rolph died on 25 July 1875, in Dundas. Upon his death, he donated part of his land for a town park. Rolph Street in Hamilton, Ontario, is named for him.

== Works cited ==
- Bailey, Thomas Melville, ed. (1981). Dictionary of Hamilton Biography. Vol. 1: Origins to 1875. Hamilton, Ontario: Dictionary of Hamilton Biography. ISBN 978-0-9691023-0-4. OCLC 1064988595.
- Godfrey, Charles (1993). John Rolph: Rebel with Causes. Madoc, Ontario: Condam Publishing. ISBN 0-921453-04-3.
- Johnson, J. K. (1988). Becoming Prominent Regional Leadership in Upper Canada, 1791–1841. Montreal: McGill-Queen's University Press. ISBN 9780773561571.
- McNairn, Jeffrey L. (2021). "Incorporating Contributory Democracy: Self-Taxation and Self-Government in Upper Canada". In Mauduit, Julien; Tunnicliffe, Jennifer (eds.). Constant Struggle Histories of Canadian Democratization. Montreal: McGill-Queen's University Press. pp. 148–171. ISBN 9780228009948.
- Petty, Ross (2022). "The 1826 Ancaster Tar and Feathers Outrage: Three Defendants' Perspectives". Ontario History. 114 (2): 196–220. doi:10.7202/1092218ar. ISSN 0030-2953.
