= Kelsey Outrage =

1872 lynching in Long Island, New York

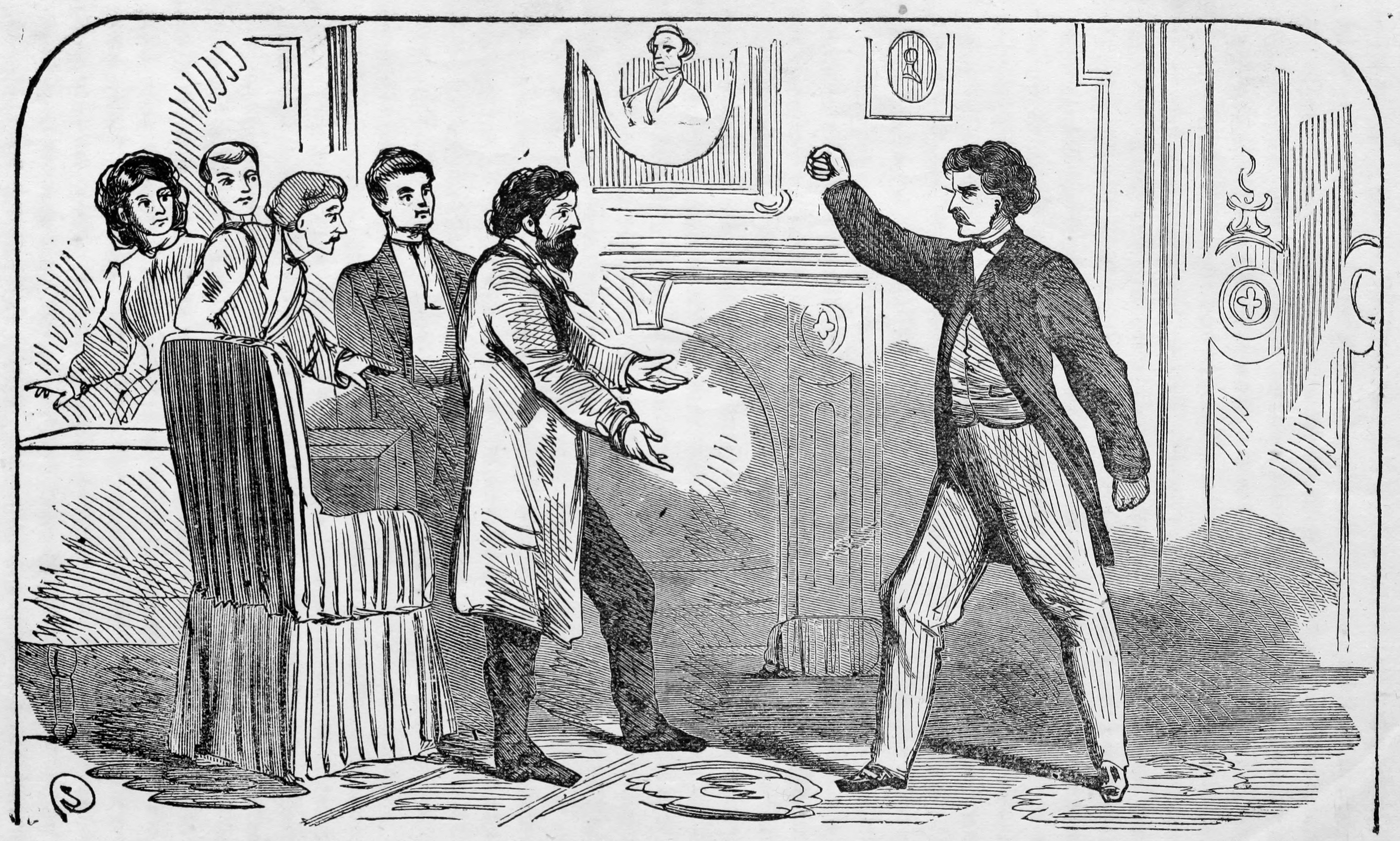
- Period depiction of the "Tar Party" laying their plans
- Date: November 4, 1872; 153 years ago
- Location: Huntington, New York, U.S.
- Type: Lynching
- Deaths: Charles G. Kelsey
- Charges: None

The Kelsey Outrage was a 1872 lynching in Huntington, New York.

== Background ==
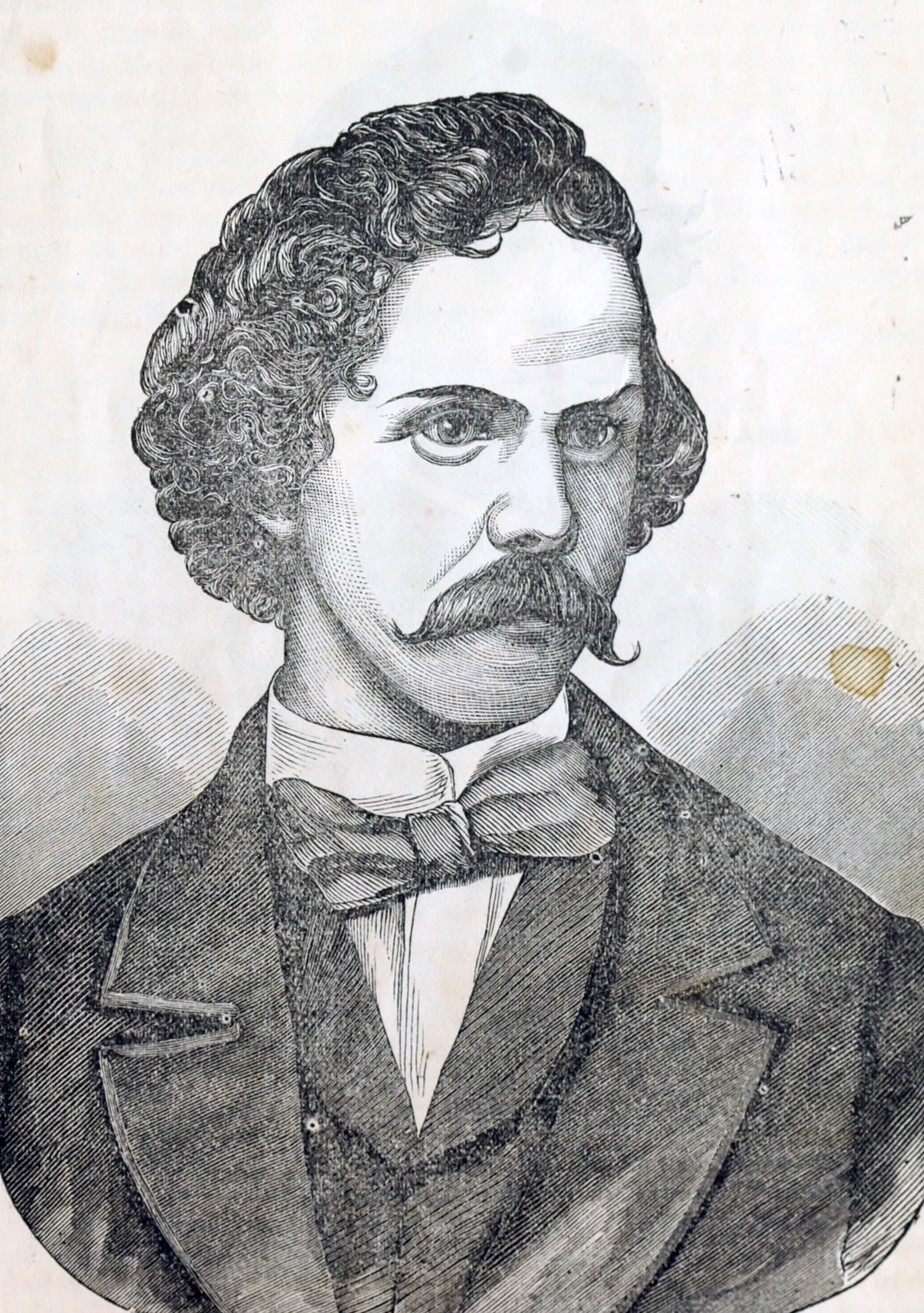
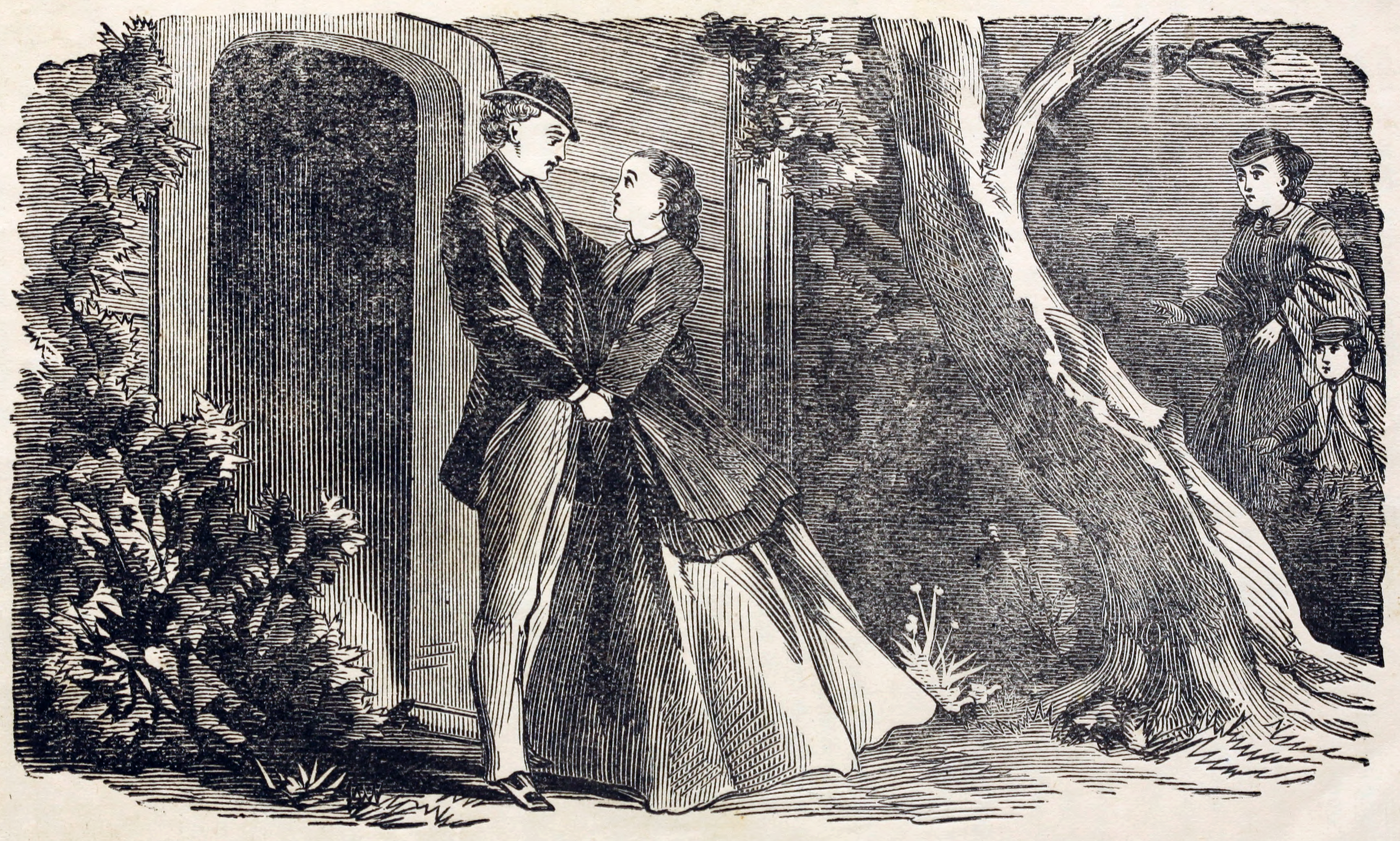

Charles G. Kelsey was an educated farmer, Sunday-school teacher, and occasional poet in his mid-30s who developed a romantic interest in Julia Smith, a woman in her early 20s who had been orphaned and raised by her grandmother, Charlotte Oakley, in a mansion on the Main Street of Huntington, New York. Kelsey and Smith had met at the Second Presbyterian church where Kelsey taught when Smith was a teenager. Smith's guardian and fellow church congregants did not approve of their relationship and age difference. Smith turned towards Royal Sammis, a 25-year-old from a prominent family in the town, and the pair became engaged, but Kelsey continued to pursue Smith, writing poetry and love letters long and acrid.

The night before Kelsey's killing, an early November day in 1872, Smith's aunt, Abby Smith, set a trap. After swapping bedrooms with Julia, the aunt reported that Kelsey entered through the bedroom's window and put his hand on her breast. She shouted and he exited through the window.

== Killing ==
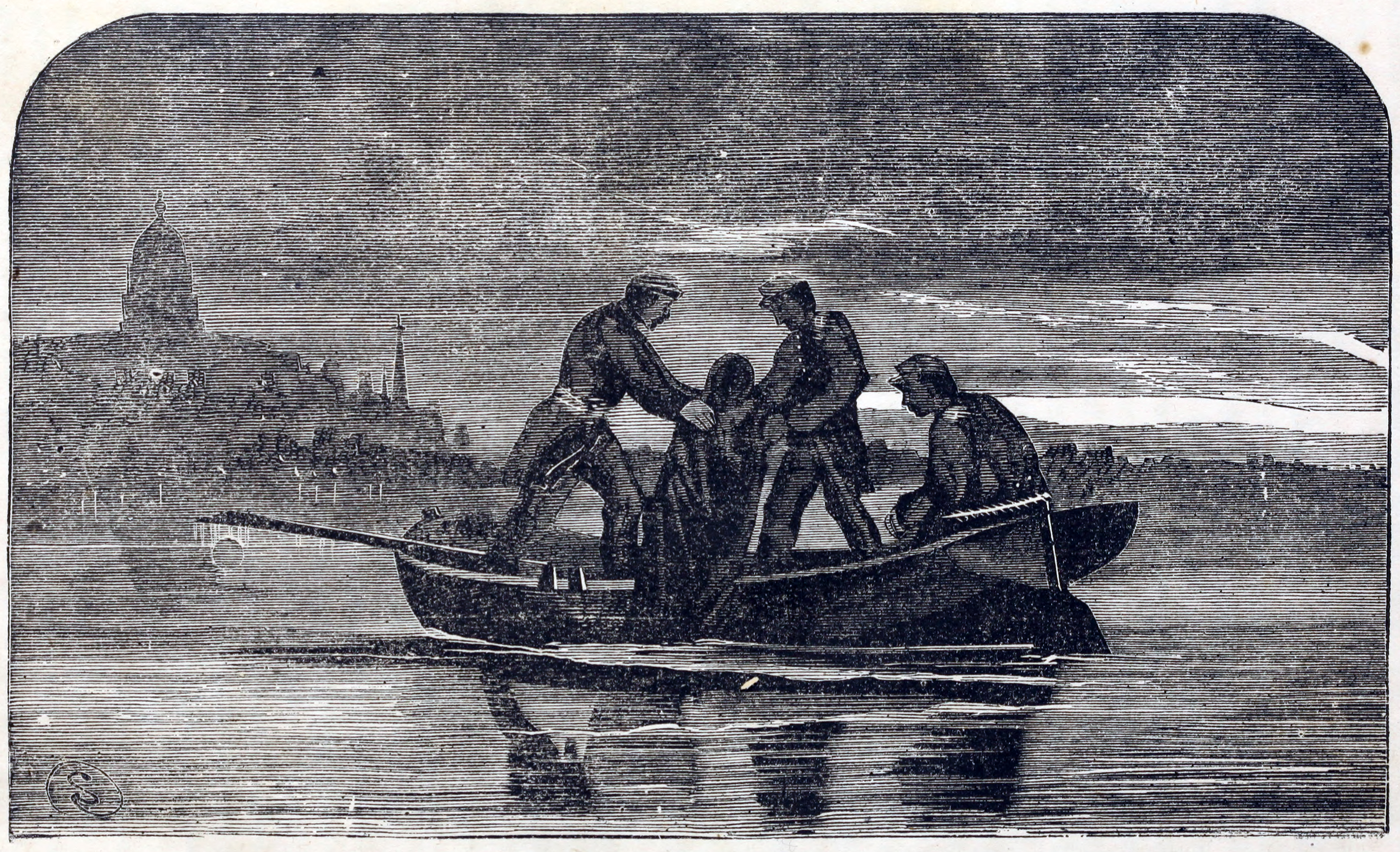
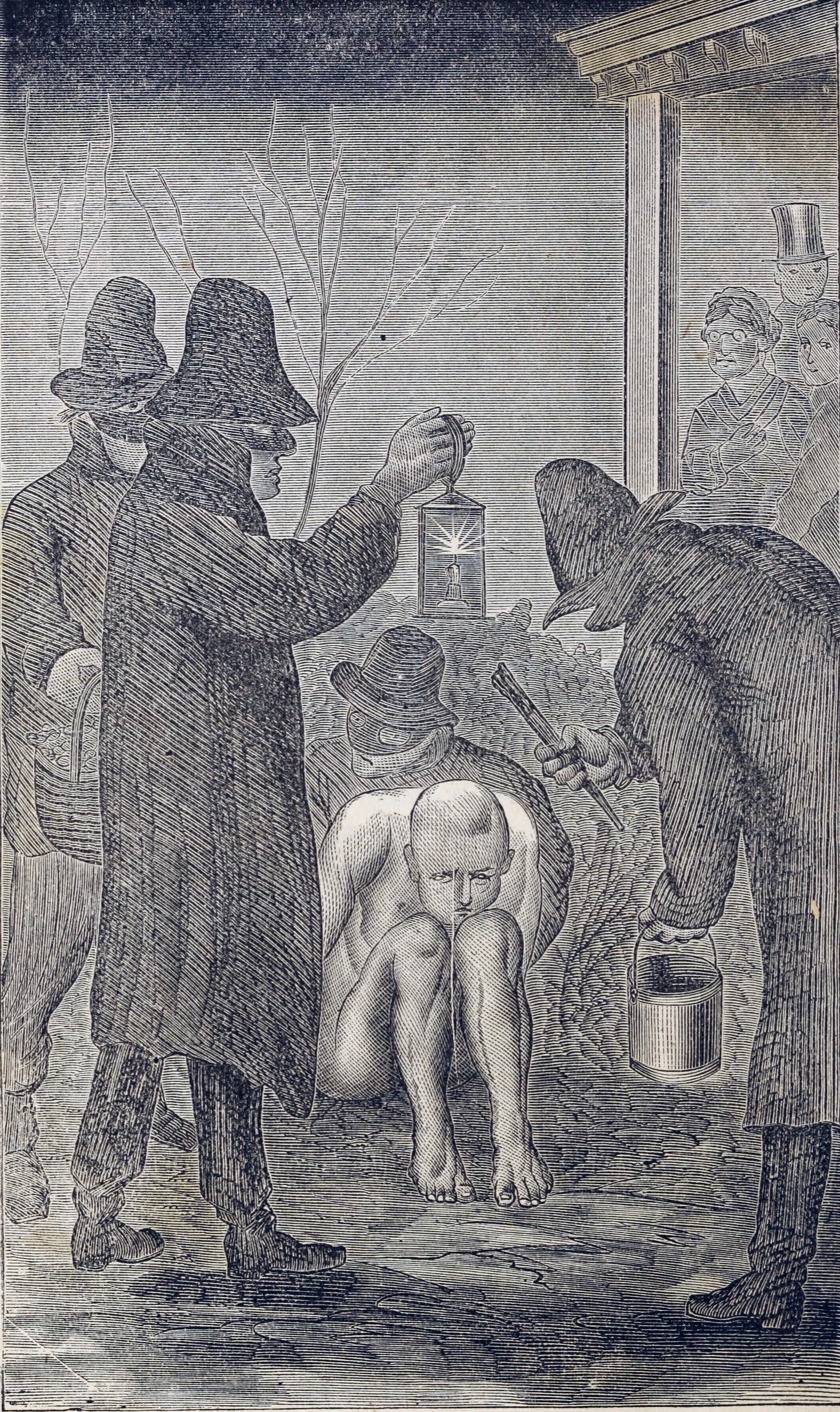

On November 4, 1872, the day following the incident with Smith's aunt, Kelsey saw a light in the house's window, which was believed to be a signal between Kelsey and Smith. As he entered the backyard, a masked group descended on Kelsey, cutting his facial hair, stripping him naked, tarring and feathering him. The men showed Kelsey to women who had gathered at a nearby barn and let him go. Kelsey began to walk towards a house he shared with his sister on Spring Street, but he was not seen alive again.

== Evidence and case ==
The next day, a fisherman in Lloyd Neck found a bloody shirt, necktie, and lemons on the beach. Kelsey's sister later said that he had purchased the lemons at her request. Following hearings, the Justice of the Peace charged Royal Sammis, Claudius Prime, and George Banks with riot and assault. Winter postponed the search for Kelsey, and the Huntington town board issued a $750 reward for Kelsey's body. Smith married Sammis the next June, 1873. In late August, a pair of fishermen in Oyster Bay Harbor found the floating lower half of a body, from its second lumbar vertebra. The black pants and attached gold watch chain were identified as likely Kelsey's. Beneath the pants, the body's legs were tarred and feathered, and its genitals had been severed. The Huntington town board initially decided to offer the fishermen half the reward for only finding half the body but later capitulated. The upper half of the body was never recovered.

Huntington's Second Presbyterian Church held a funeral for Kelsey with his recovered legs in September 1873. At the time, the body's identity was still contested and the minister would not allow the legs inside the church. The event was known as "the funeral of the legs".

Doctors in the coroner's inquest reported that Kelsey had bled out from the castration, during which he had been alive. They believed his body has been severed by the pressure of a rope around his waist that had been weighted and thrown in the water. The October coroner's jury concluded that Kelsey was murdered and that Sammis and five others had aided and abetted through the tar and feathering outrage, yet did not name a murderer. New York Governor John Adams Dix opened a $3,000 reward (equivalent to $81,000 in 2025) for information leading to the conviction of the murderer. The next month, a Suffolk County grand jury indicted Sammis and Banks for riot and assault, and Sammis and his younger brother, Rudolph, for second-degree murder.

Prosecuted by Suffolk District Attorney James H. Tuthill, the case took years to come to trial. In October 1875, a Suffolk County jury acquitted Royal Sammis and George Banks of the riot and assault charges. The murder charges never went to trial.

== Aftermath ==
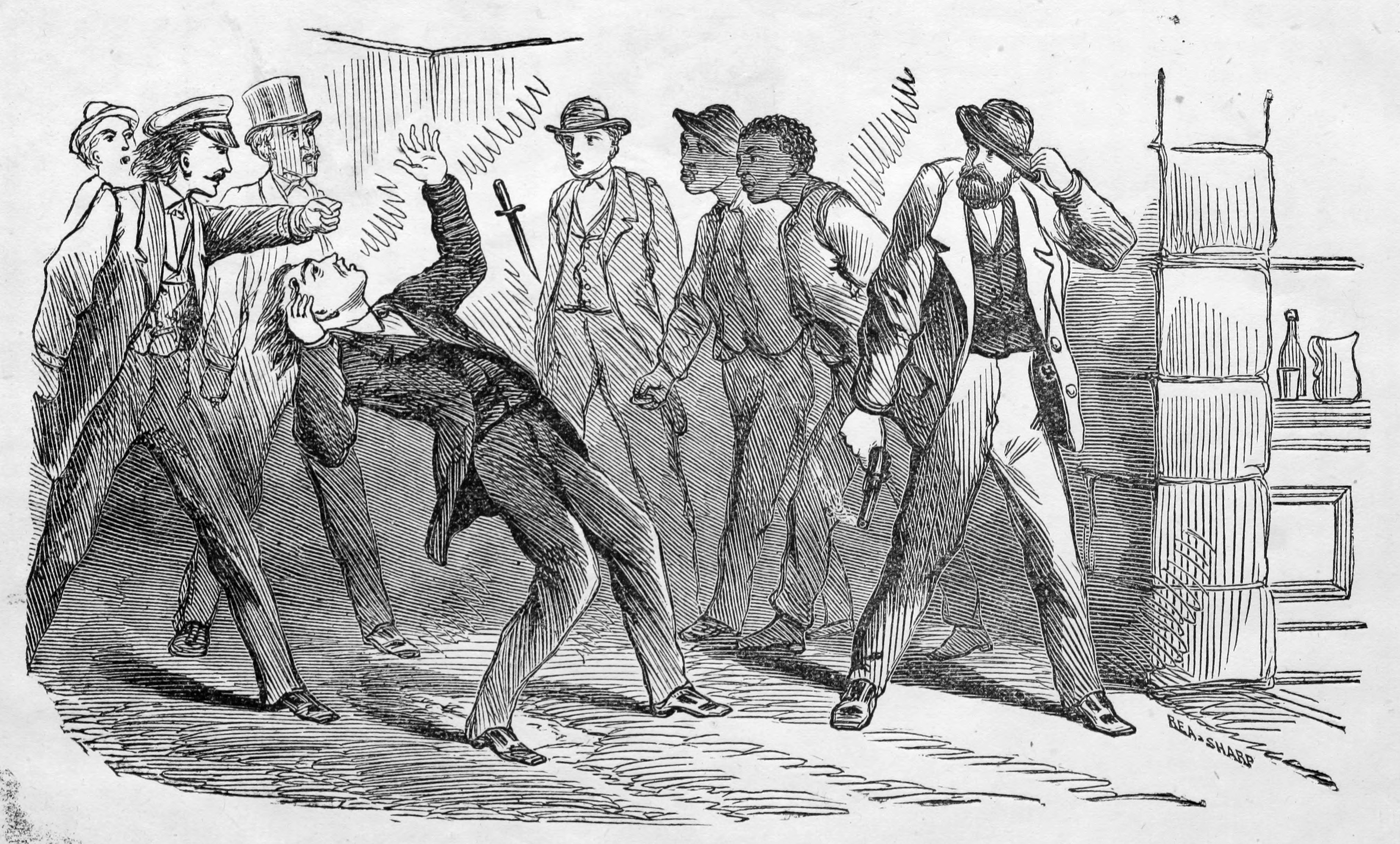
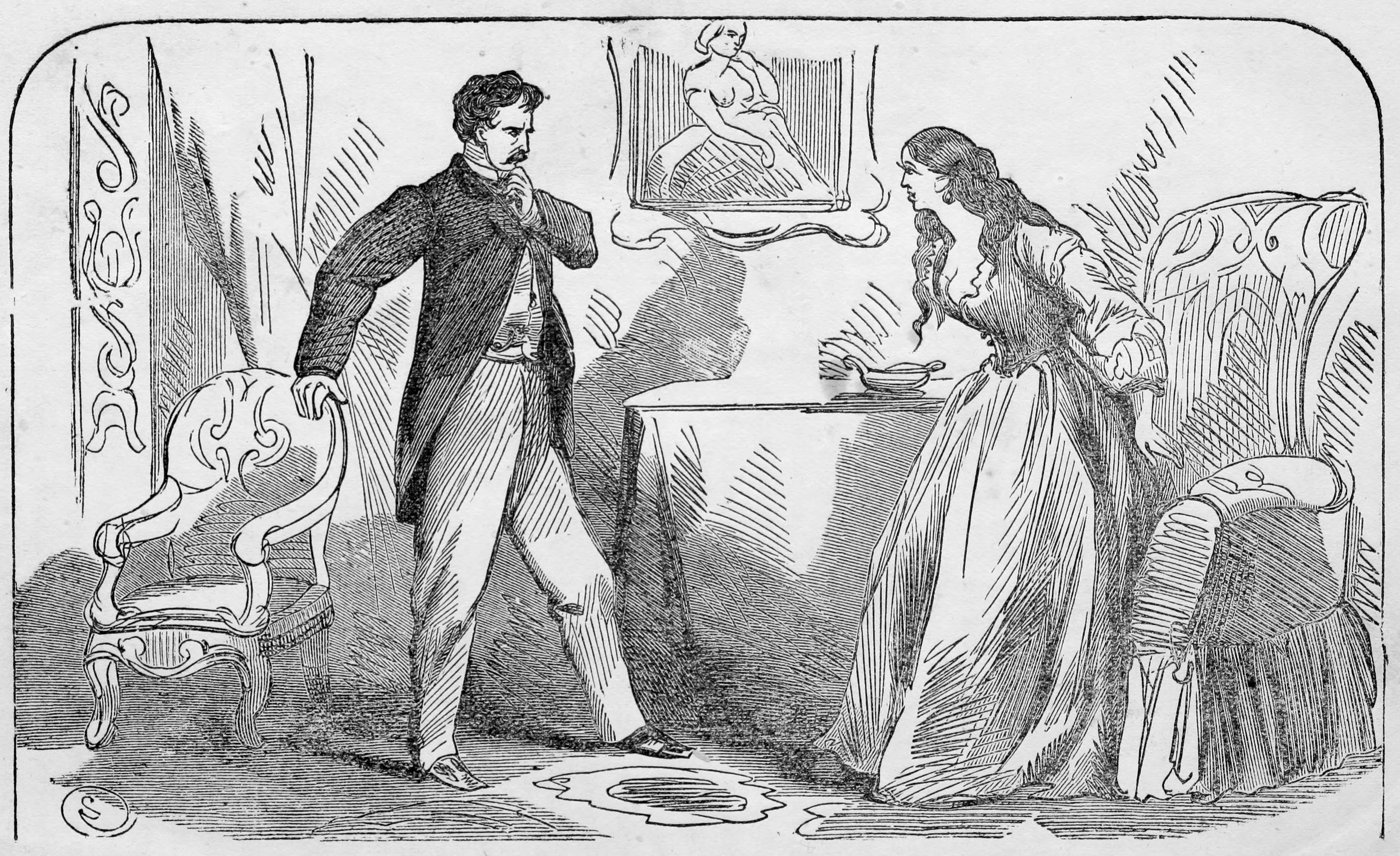

The story made national news as a sensation and Huntington became called "Tar Town". The Brooklyn Eagle said the incident had stained the image of Long Island with a brutality more befitting of the American frontier. The town's 2,500 residents divided as "Tars" and "Anti-Tars", either supporting or opposing the mob's actions. The incident spawned the popular phrase "as dead as Kelsey's nuts", which persisted over the following decades and into the 21st century.

A 1873 account of the outrage was largely destroyed by the Sammis and Smith families. Sammis descendants remained in Huntington through the late 20th century. The historical barn associated with the tar and feathering incident was torn down in January 2001 after conservators found it beyond repair.
