= List of Panamericana Televisión telenovelas =

Panamericana Televisión is a Peruvian television network that is owned by Panamericana Televisión Inversiones S.A.C. It was founded on July 21, 1957, by Genaro Delgado Parker (1929-2017). El caso Caryl Chessman was the first telenovela produced by the network.

== 1960s ==
=== 1960 ===
Title	Ep.	Author	First aired	Last aired	Ref.
Amar es vivir	30	Humberto Bravo			
Historia de tres hermanas	80	Juan Ureta			
Esta es su vida	40	Enrique Victoria			

=== 1961 ===
Title	Ep.	Author	First aired	Last aired	Ref.
Almas solitarias	30	Rafael Garrida			
El abogado del diablo	20				
Los culpables	15	Juan Ureta			
Mañana comienza el amor	40	Gloria Travesi			

=== 1962 ===
Title	Ep.	Author	First aired	Last aired	Ref.
Mama	15				
El cuarto mandamiento	30	Queca Herrero			
Difamada	20	Gloria Travesi			
Las madres nunca mueren	80	Gloria Travesi			
Acusada	30	Juan Ureta			
La parroquia de mi barrio	40				
La cobarde	15	Gloria Travesi			
Ansiedad	30	Gloria Travesi			
Cara sucia	60	Felipe sanguinetti			

=== 1963 ===
Title	Ep.	Author	First aired	Last aired	Ref.
Mujercitas	30	Fernando Travesi			
El pecado y la virtud	15	Jose Caparros			
Muñeca negra	20	Gloria Travesi			
Los novios	40	Queca Herrero			
Entre tu amor y la fe	20	Queca Herrero			
Intriga infame	40	Felipe Sanguinetti			
Horas de angustia	15	Queca Herrero			
Maria Laura	50	Juan Ureta			

=== 1964 ===
Title	Ep.	Author	First aired	Last aired	Ref.
El secreto de sor Teresa	60	Juan Ureta			
La mascara	30	Gloria Travesi			
Los diez pecados del hombre	30	Gloria Travesi			
El error de los padres	15	Gloria Travesi			
La huerfana	40	Jose Caparros			
La via Dolorosa	30	Jose Caparros			

=== 1965 ===
Title	Ep.	Author	First aired	Last aired	Ref.
Dos amores	30	Gloria Travesi			
Amor sin fronteras	20	Gloria Travesi			
Corazon Herido	30	Queca Herrero			
El hermano	15	Queca Herrero			

=== 1966 ===
Title	Ep.	Author	First aired	Last aired	Ref.
El pecado de los Bromfield	50	Gloria travesi			
La Red	50	Queca Herrero			

=== 1967 ===
Title	Ep.	Author	First aired	Last aired	Ref.
Con ella vino el odio	60	Gloria Travesi			

=== 1968 ===
Title	Ep.	Author	First aired	Last aired	Ref.
Los hipocritas	100	Gloria Travesi			

=== 1969 ===
Title	Ep.	Author	First aired	Last aired	Ref.
Simplemente María	300	Celia Alcantara			

== 1970s ==
=== 1970 ===
Title	Ep.	Author	First aired	Last aired	Ref.
Natacha	200	Abel Santacruz			
El adorable profesor Aldao	100	Alberto Migre			
Secuestro en el cielo	20	Gloria Travesi			

=== 1971 ===
Title	Ep.	Author	First aired	Last aired	Ref.
Rosas para Veronica	100	Abel Santa Cruz			
La inconquistable Viviana Hortiguera	60	Alberto Migre			
Un verano para recordar	60	Juan Ureta			

=== 1972 ===
Title	Ep.	Author	First aired	Last aired	Ref.
Mujeres que trabajan	100	Abel Santa Cruz			
La fabrica	100	Geraldo Vietri			
Corazon de oro	100	Gloria Travesi			
Margie	80	Rosa Franco			
Encontre mi destino	100	Rosa Franco			

=== 1973 ===
Title	Ep.	Author	First aired	Last aired	Ref.
Me llaman Gorrion	95	Abel Santa Cruz			
Lo que trajo El mar	100	Juan Ureta			
Los Torres	80	Gloria Travesi			
La heredera	80	Juan Ureta			
Ambicion	80	Juan Ureta			

=== 1974 ===
Title	Ep.	Author	First aired	Last aired	Ref.
Destino	100	Juan Ureta			

=== 1975 ===
Title	Ep.	Author	First aired	Last aired	Ref.
El buen ambiente	80	Carlos Velasquez			

=== 1976 ===
Title	Ep.	Author	First aired	Last aired	Ref.
El diario de Pablo Marcos	120	Juan Rivera Saavedra			

=== 1977 ===
Title	Ep.	Author	First aired	Last aired	Ref.
Lucia Sierra	50	Rosa Franco			

=== 1978 ===
Title	Ep.	Author	First aired	Last aired	Ref.
Una Larga Noche	120	Bianca Casagrande			

=== 1979 ===
Title	Ep.	Author	First aired	Last aired	Ref.
Del amor y otros sueños	50	Bianca Casagrande			

== 1980s ==
=== 1980 ===
Title	Ep.	Author	First aired	Last aired	Ref.
Tres mujeres tres vidas	100	Juan Ureta			

=== 1984 ===
Title	Ep.	Author	First aired	Last aired	Ref.
Paginas de la vida	150	Juan Ureta			

=== 1985 ===
Title	Ep.	Author	First aired	Last aired	Ref.
La casa de enfrente	120	Herman Herman			
Carmin	120	Augusto Tamayo			
En familia	100	Rodolfo Ledo			
Carmin 2	120	Fernando Barreto			

=== 1986 ===
Title	Ep.	Author	First aired	Last aired	Ref.
Saña	50	Maria Cristina Ribal			

=== 1987 ===
Title	Ep.	Author	First aired	Last aired	Ref.
La Doña	50	Rodolfo Ledo			

=== 1988 ===
Title	Ep.	Author	First aired	Last aired	Ref.
Cero en conducta	50	Juan Ureta			

=== 1989 ===
Title	Ep.	Author	First aired	Last aired	Ref.
El hombre que debe morir	150	Janet Cleair			

== 1990s ==
=== 1990 ===
Title	Ep.	Author	First aired	Last aired	Ref.
Natacha	200	Fernando Barreto			

=== 1994 ===
Title	Ep.	Author	First aired	Last aired	Ref.
Gorrion	100	Fernando Barreto			

=== 1995 ===
Title	Ep.	Author	First aired	Last aired	Ref.
Canela	100	Rocio Silva Santistevan			

=== 1996 ===
Title	Ep.	Author	First aired	Last aired	Ref.
Nino	80	Gigo Aranda			

=== 1998 ===
Title	Ep.	Author	First aired	Last aired	Ref.
Gabriela	120	Gigo Aranda			

=== 1999 ===
Title	Ep.	Author	First aired	Last aired	Ref.
Andrea Tiempo de amar	50	Gigo Aranda			
Travesuras del corazon	100	Roxana Valdivieso			
Procura amarme mas	100	Pablo Serra			

== 2000s ==
=== 2000 ===
Title	Ep.	Author	First aired	Last aired	Ref.
María Rosa, búscame una esposa	120	Salamanca			
Vidas prestadas	100	Alfonso Pareja			

=== 2001 ===
Title	Ep.	Author	First aired	Last aired	Ref.
Con los pelos de punta	80	Roxana Valdivieso			

=== 2002 ===
Title	Ep.	Author	First aired	Last aired	Ref.
Estos chikos de ahora	200	Efrain Aguilar			

=== 2004 ===
Title	Ep.	Author	First aired	Last aired	Ref.
Tormenta de pasiones	120	Lucia Irurita			

=== 2005 ===
Title	Ep.	Author	First aired	Last aired	Ref.
Los del Solar	1000	Michel Gomx			

=== 2006 ===
Title	Ep.	Author	First aired	Last aired	Ref.
Amores como el nuestro	100	Eduardo Adrianzen			
