= List of entertainers in Mexico =

Mexico is considered as the Hollywood of Latin America because of the strength of its music and television industry as well as its history of Cinema. Foreign artists have started or continued their career in Mexico, especially in the telenovela industry.

In music, several artists have re-located or started their career in Mexico because it is the largest Spanish-speaking country in the world. Bands like La Quinta Estación started their career in Mexico because they think only a few Spanish artist become famous internationally and from Mexico they have been able to become known in Argentina, Chile and the United States.

== Africa ==
=== Kenya ===
- Arap Bethke, actor

== Americas ==
=== Argentina ===
- Amanda Miguel (singer)
- Raúl Astor (actor, show host)
- Cristian Bach (actress)
- Patricio Borghetti (actor)
- Grecia Colmenares (actress)
- Rosa María Bianchi (actress)
- Chela Castro (actress)
- Juan Carlos Colombo (actor)
- Lucy Gallardo (actress)
- Javier Gómez (actor)
- Margarita Gralia (actress)
- Mariana Karr (actress)
- Sergio Kleiner (actor)
- Libertad Lamarque (actress, singer)
- Saul Lisazo (actor)
- Marga López (actress)
- Marcela López Rey (actress)
- Maky (actress)
- Roxana Martínez ("La Tetanic") (actress, model)
- Cecilia Ponce (model, actress)
- Manuel Puig (writer, screenwriter)
- Martin Ricca (actor, singer)
- Sebastián Rulli (actor, model)
- Sabrina Sabrok (model)
- Juan Soler (actor)
- René Strickler (actor)
- Thelma Tixou (model/actress)
- Barbara Torres (actress/comedian)
- Diego Verdaguer (singer)

=== Brazil ===
- Denisse de Kalaffe (singer/songwriter)
- Guy Ecker (actor)
- Marcus Ornellas (actor)

=== Canada ===
- Fannie Kauffman (actress)

=== Chile ===
- Rafael Araneda (TV host)
- Lucho Gatica (singer)
- Jorge González (lead singer of Los Prisioneros)
- Alejandro Jodorowsky (film director)
- La Ley (rock band)
- Kudai (pop band)
- Olivia Collins (actress)

=== Colombia ===
- David Galindo (actor)
- Juan Pablo Gamboa (actor)
- Danna García (actress)
- Harry Geithner (actor)
- Shakira (singer)
- Daniel Arenas (actor)

=== Costa Rica ===
- Crox Alvarado (actor)
- Vica Andrade (actress, model)
- Maribel Guardia (actress/singer)
- Mary Esquivel (vedette/actress)
- Rafael Rojas (actor)
- Chavela Vargas (singer)

=== Cuba ===
- Amalia Aguilar (actress)
- Aylín Mújica (actress)
- Carmen Montejo (actress)
- César Évora (actor)
- Fannie Kauffman (actress)
- Francisco Gattorno (actor)
- Jacqueline García (actress, show host)
- Julia Marichal (actress)
- Julio Camejo (actor)
- Karen Juantorena (actress)
- Liz Vega (actress)
- María Antonieta Pons (actress)
- Mario Cimarro (actor)
- Niurka Marcos (actress/singer)
- Óscar Ortiz de Pinedo (actor)
- Pedro Sicard (actor)
- Rafael Bertrand (actor)
- Raquel Olmedo (actress)
- Rene Lavan (actor)
- Rosa Carmina (actress)
- Ninón Sevilla (dancer/actress)
- William Levy (actor)
- Zully Montero (actress)

=== Dominican Republic ===
- Anthony Alvarez (actor)
- Carlos Cámara (actor)
- Andrés García (actor)
- Carlos de la Mota (actor)

=== Guatemala ===
- Álvaro Morales (sportscaster)
- Ricardo Arjona (singer)
- Deborah David (model)
- Héctor Sandarti (comedian)

=== Paraguay ===
- Wanda Seux (vedette)

=== Peru ===
- Patricia Pereyra (actress)
- Ricardo Blume (actor)
- Roberto Ballesteros (actor)
- Saby Kamalich (actress)
- Tania Libertad (singer)

=== Puerto Rico ===
- Yerye Beirute, (actor)
- Armando Calvo, (actor)
- Braulio Castillo, (actor)
- Iris Chacón, (vedette/actress)
- Chayanne, (singer/actor)
- Mapita Cortés, (actress)
- Mapy Cortés, (actress)
- Alba Nydia Díaz, (actress)
- Adamari López, (actress)
- Johnny Lozada, (singer/actor)
- Ricky Martin, (singer/actor)
- Charlie Masso, singer/actor
- Luis Miguel, (singer/actor)
- Carlos Ponce, (singer/actor)
- Osvaldo Ríos, (actor)

=== United States ===
- Pepe Aguilar (singer)
- Alexis Ayala (actor)
- Angélica María (singer/actress)
- Chabelo (comedian/tv host)
- Elizabeth Campbell (actress))
- Erik Estrada (actor)
- Alex González (drummer of Maná)
- Ha*Ash (band)
- Marisela (singer)
- Yolanda Montes "Tongolele" (dancer/actress)
- Luis José Santander (actor)
- Julieta Venegas (singer)
- Manoella Torres (singer)
- Michelle Vieth (actress)

=== Uruguay ===
- Marcelo Buquet (actor)
- Sergio Fachelli (singer and songwriter)
- Bárbara Mori (actress)

=== Venezuela ===
- Rosita Arenas (actress)
- Grecia Colmenares (actress)
- Fernando Carrillo (actor)
- Gaby Espino (actress)
- Enrique Guzmán (singer/actor)
- Lupita Ferrer (actress)
- Miguel de León (actor)
- Alicia Machado (actress)
- Luis José Santander (actor)
- Gabriela Spanic (actress)
- Raúl Vale (singer/actor/comedian)

== Europe ==
=== Albania ===
- Xhevdet Bajraj (writer)

=== Austria ===
- Barbara Angely (actress)
- Isabel del Puerto (actress)

=== Bulgaria ===
- Dobrina Cristeva (actress)

=== Czech Republic ===
- Miroslava (actress)

=== England ===
- Azela Robinson (actress)
- Beatriz Sheridan
- Jacqueline Voltaire (actress)

=== France ===
- Brigitte Aubé (actress)
- Angelique Boyer (actress)
- Elizabeth Katz (actress)
- Christiane Martel (actress)

=== Germany ===
- Christa Linder (actress)
- Sabine Moussier (actress)

=== Italy ===
- Rosángela Balbó (actress)
- Ángel Di Stefani (stunt double/actor)
- Martha Roth (actress)
- Maura Monti (actress)
- Nicky Mondellini (actress)

=== Latvia ===
- Wolf Rubinski (actor)

=== Lithuania ===
- Estanislao Shilinsky Bachanska (actor)

=== Montenegro ===
- Sasha Montenegro (vedette)

=== Netherlands ===
- Roberto Vander (actor)

=== Norway ===
- Eva Norvind (actress)

=== Poland ===
- Arleta Jeziorska (actress)
- Maya Mishalska (actress)
- Dominika Paleta (actress)
- Ludwika Paleta (actress)
- Zbigniew Paleta (violin player/movie score)
- Kristoff (actor/TV personality)

=== Romania ===
- Joana Benedek (actress)

=== Russia ===
- Irina Baeva (actress)
- Julián de Meriche (actor)

=== Spain ===
- Luis Buñuel (film director)
- Isabelita Blanch (actress)
- Plácido Domingo (singer)
- Angelines Fernández "La bruja del 71" (actress)
- Prudencia Grifell (actress)
- Ofelia Guilmáin (actress)
- Emilia Guiú (actress)
- Belinda (singer/actress)
- Frances Ondiviela (actress)
- Juan Orol (filmmaker/actor)
- Mercedes Molto (actress)
- Sara Montiel (actress and singer)
- Monica Naranjo (singer)
- Mercedes Pascual (actress)
- La Quinta Estación (rock band)
- Francisco Rabal (actor)
- Enrique Rambal (actor)
- Ivan Sanchez (actor)
- Anna Silvetti (actress)
- Yolanda Ventura (singer/actress)
- Rocío Dúrcal (singer)
- Shaila Dúrcal (singer)

=== Ukraine ===
- Ana Layevska (actress)

== Asia ==
=== Iran ===
- Irán Eory (actress)

== See also ==
- Demographics of Mexico
- Immigration in Mexico
