= Hernán Romero =

Peruvian actor (1942–2025)

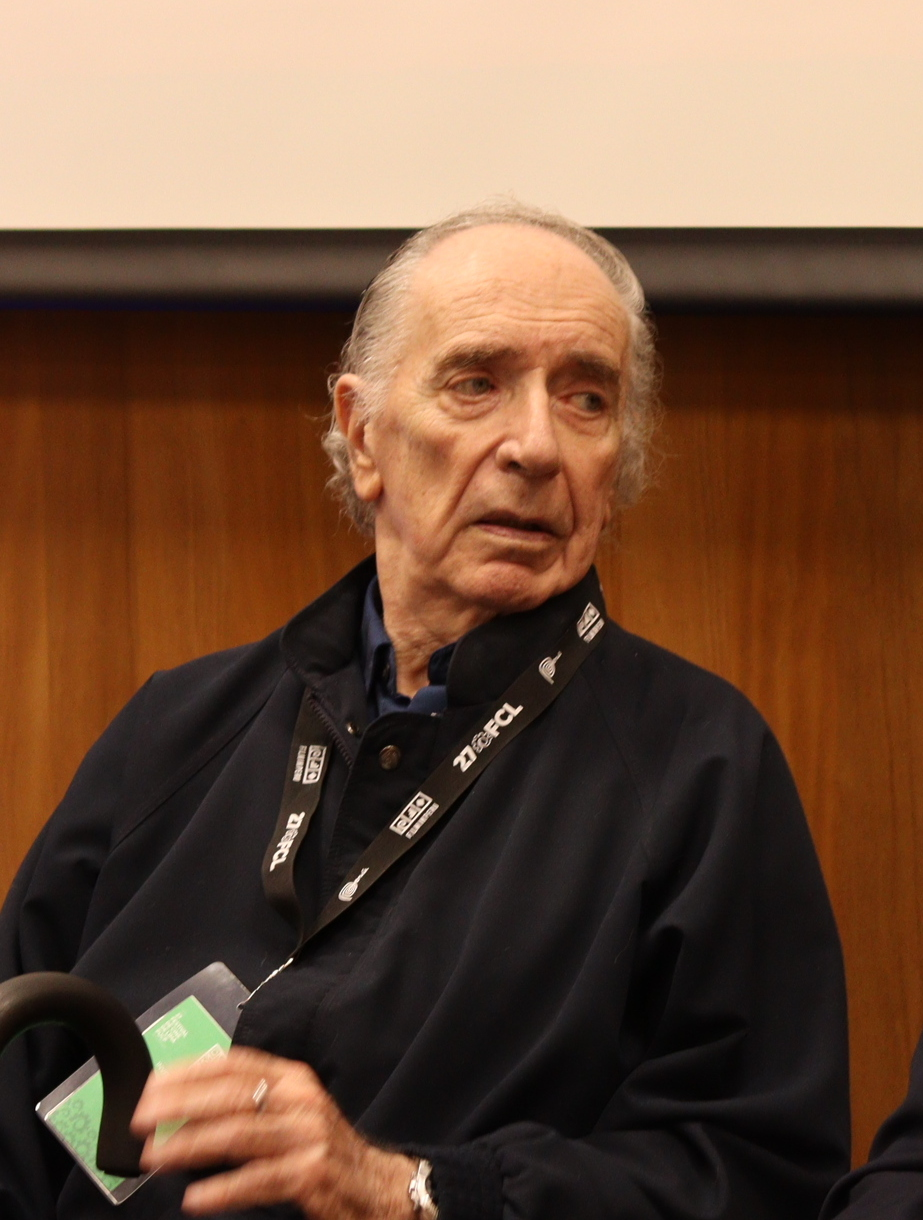
- Romero in 2023
- Born: 5 June 1942; Callao, Peru
- Died: 23 September 2025 (aged 83)
- Occupation: Actor
- Years active: 1961–2023

Hernán Romero Berrio (5 June 1942 – 23 September 2025) was a Peruvian actor. He was one of the most recognized actors of his country, with an acting career spanning more than six decades. He appeared in more than 90 stage productions, 25 telenovelas, and 15 films, and was noted for his powerful stage presence.

Romero began his career in the early 1960s at the Pontifical Catholic University of Peru. On stage, he performed in both classical and contemporary works, while on television he starred in telenovelas such as Simplemente María, El adorable profesor Aldao, Gorrión, Luz María, and Pobre diabla. His film appearances included The Green Wall (1970), Fallen from Heaven (1990), and Red Ink (2000).

== Early life and education ==
Romero was born in Callao on 5 June 1942. He studied at the Colegio Sagrados Corazones Recoleta and the Colegio Militar Leoncio Prado before entering the Pontifical Catholic University of Peru to study law. During his first year, while enrolled in the Faculty of Letters, he and several classmates staged a play. Impressed by their enthusiasm, the dean appointed Ricardo Blume as their theatre instructor.

== Career ==
=== Theater ===
Romero made his stage debut on 14 December 1961 at the Pontifical Catholic University of Peru in a production of Tristan and Iseult directed by Ricardo Blume. From then on, he established himself as a respected figure in the national arts, appearing in plays including Romeo y Julieta, El gran teatro del mundo, La mujer del domingo, Don Juan Tenorio, La ópera de los tres centavos, La muerte de un viajante, Las manos sucias, and Ojos bonitos cuadros feos, among others.

Alongside Ricardo Blume, Romero founded the Teatro de la Universidad Católica.

=== Film and television ===
Romero began working in television around 1965. In the 1970s, he worked in Colombia, Venezuela, and Mexico, returning to Peru in the mid-1980s. He appeared in telenovelas and series including Simplemente María, El adorable profesor Aldao, Matrimonios y algo más, El ángel vengador: Calígula, Gorrión, Nino, Escándalo, Cosas del amor, Pobre diabla, Un amor indomable, and Los otros libertadores. He also directed and produced documentaries and commercials.

In cinema, Romero starred in films such as The Green Wall (1970), Fallen from Heaven (1990), and Red Ink (2000). His last film role was in The Last Laugh (2023), where he played the father of César Ritter.

== Personal life ==
Romero was married to actress Martha Figueroa, with whom he had a daughter, Patricia. In the 1990s, he married actress Malena Elías, with whom he had a daughter, Ximena.

=== Illness and death ===
In March 2023, Romero suffered a spinal injury from a fall, which forced him to withdraw from the play Eutanasia. He later reappeared at the Lima Film Festival.

Romero died on 23 September 2025, at the age of 83, after a prolonged illness that had kept him away from public life in his final months. His remains were laid in state at the Ministry of Culture in Lima on 24 September 2025.

=== Honors and recognition ===
Over the course of his career, Romero received honors from the Ministry of Culture, the Congress of the Republic, the Ministry of Labour, the Municipality of Lima, the Municipality of Santiago de Surco, the Pontifical Catholic University of Peru, the Universidad Inca Garcilaso de la Vega, and the Scientific University of the South.

On 18 August 2023, during the closing ceremony of the 27th Lima Film Festival, the Pontifical Catholic University of Peru paid tribute to Romero's 62-year artistic career.

== Selected filmography ==
=== Feature films ===
- The Green Wall (1970)
- Fallen from Heaven (1990)
- Without Compassion (1994)
- Don't Tell Anyone (1998)
- Red Ink (2000)
- El bien esquivo (2001)
- El gran León (2017)
- Irresistible Seducers (2022)
- The Last Laugh (2023)

=== Television ===
The following works are listed by Diario Expreso.

- Locura de amor (1967)
- Santa Rosa de Lima (1967)
- Si no fueras tú (1969)
- Simplemente María (1969–1971)
- El maestro (1969)
- El canillita (1969)
- El adorable profesor Aldao (1971)
- La inconquistable Viviana Hortiguera (1972)
- El diario de Pablo Marcos (1976)
- Volver a vivir (1978)
- Matrimonios y algo más (1983)
- Páginas de la vida (1984)
- El hombre que debe morir (1989)
- El ángel vengador: Calígula (1993)
- Gorrión (1994)
- Nino (1996)
- Escándalo (1997)
- Gabriela (1998)
- Cosas del amor (1998)
- Pobre diabla (2000)
- Soledad (2001)
