= The City and the Dogs =

1985 film

- Film poster
- Directed by: Francisco José Lombardi
- Screenplay by: José Watanabe
- Based on: The Time of the Hero by Mario Vargas Llosa
- Produced by: Francisco José Lombardi
- Starring: Pablo Serra; Gustavo Bueno; Luis Álvarez; Juan Manuel Ochoa; Eduardo Adrianzén; Liliana Navarro; Alberto Isola
- Cinematography: Pili Flores Guerra
- Edited by: Gianfranco Annichini; Augusto Tamayo San Román
- Music by: Enrique Iturriaga
- Release dates: 11 May 1985 (Cannes); 18 June 1985 (Peru)
- Running time: 135 minutes
- Country: Peru
- Language: Spanish

The City and the Dogs (Spanish: La ciudad y los perros) is a 1985 Peruvian drama film directed by Francisco José Lombardi. It is based on The Time of the Hero, a 1963 novel by Nobel Prize laureate Mario Vargas Llosa, which tells the story of a group of young military cadets at the Leoncio Prado Military Academy in Lima.

The film was selected as the Peruvian entry for the Best Foreign Language Film at the 58th Academy Awards, but was not accepted as a nominee.

== Cast ==
- Alberto Ísola as Mayor Garrido
- Gustavo Bueno as Lt. Gamboa (Teniente Gamboa)
- Luis Álvarez as The Coronel (El Coronel)
- Juan Manuel Ochoa as The Jaguar (El Jaguar)
- Eduardo Adrianzén as The Slave (El Esclavo)
- Liliana Navarro as Teresa
- Miguel Iza as Arrospide
- Pablo Serra as The Poet (El Poeta)
- Jorge Rodríguez Paz as The General (El General)

== See also ==
- List of submissions to the 58th Academy Awards for Best Foreign Language Film
- List of Peruvian submissions for the Academy Award for Best Foreign Language Film
