= La casa al final de la calle =

Mexican telenovela

- Genre: Telenovela
- Written by: Antonio Monsell
- Directed by: Jorge Fons
- Starring: Angélica Aragón; Leticia Calderón; Héctor Bonilla; Eduardo Palomo; Luis Bayardo; Saby Kamalich; José Alonso
- Opening theme: La casa al final de la calle by Amparo Rubín
- Country of origin: Mexico
- Original language: Spanish
- No. of episodes: 170

Production
- Executive producer: Juan Osorio
- Production locations: Mexico City, Mexico; London, England, United Kingdom; Paris, France
- Cinematography: Antonio Acevedo

Original release
- Network: Canal de las Estrellas
- Release: January 16 – September 8, 1989

Related
- El Extraño Retorno de Diana Salazar; Morir para vivir

La casa al final de la calle (English title: The house at the end of the street) is a Mexican telenovela produced by Juan Osorio for Televisa in 1989.

Angélica Aragón, Leticia Calderón, Héctor Bonilla and Eduardo Palomo starred as protagonists, Margarita Gralia and Guillermo García Cantú starred as co-protagonists, while José Alonso starred as antagonist. Luis Bayardo and Saby Kamalich starred.

== Cast ==
- Héctor Bonilla as César Peralta
- Angélica Aragón as Leonor Altamirano Nájera
- Leticia Calderón as Teresa Altamirano Nájera
- Luis Bayardo as Roberto Gaytán
- Saby Kamalich as Esperanza de Gaytán
- José Alonso as Bronski
- Margarita Gralia as Rebeca Ulloa
- Guillermo García Cantú as Braulio
- Eduardo Palomo as Claudio Juárez
- Lilia Aragón as Iris Carrillo
- Octavio Galindo as Gustavo
- Dunia Zaldívar as Guadalupe
- Gina Moret as Gloria
- Alejandra Peniche as Laura
- Narciso Busquets as Don Renato
- Ernesto Vilchis as Virgilio
- Alejandra Vidal as Elsa
- Paco Rabell as Iglesias
- Maricarmen Vela as Ligia Andrade
- Teresa Rábago as Luisa
- Cecilia Romo as Verónica
- Jaime Ortiz Pino as Dr. Balbuena
- Nando Estevane as Marcelo
- Beatriz Martínez as Dra. Ponce
- Miguel Macía as Márquez
- Luis de Icaza as Alex
- Marta Verduzco as Eva Estrada
- Blas García as Rubén
- Tere Mondragón as Engracia
- José Luis Padilla as Patricio
- Josefina Echánove as María
- Tina Romero as Marina Durán
- Claudio Obregón as Sergio Escobar
- Luis Couturier as Víctor Gálvez
- Alonso Echánove as Rafael Lozada
- Elizabeth Katz as Eva Estrada (young)
- Guillermo Gil as Óscar

== Awards ==
Year	Award	Category	Nominee	Result
1990	8th TVyNovelas Awards	Best Actress	Angélica Aragón	Nominated
1990	8th TVyNovelas Awards	Best Actor	Héctor Bonilla	Won
1990	8th TVyNovelas Awards	Best Antagonist Actor	José Alonso	Nominated
1990	8th TVyNovelas Awards	Best Young Lead Actor	Guillermo García Cantú	Nominated
1990	8th TVyNovelas Awards	Best Male Revelation	Eduardo Palomo	Won
1990	8th TVyNovelas Awards	Best Direction	Jorge Fons	Won
1990	8th TVyNovelas Awards	Best Production	Juan Osorio	Won
