= Saint Thérèse of the Child Jesus Church =

Catholic church in Lima, Peru

Coordinates: 12°04′08″S 77°02′03″W

Saint Thérèse of the Child Jesus
- Santa Teresita del Niño Jesús
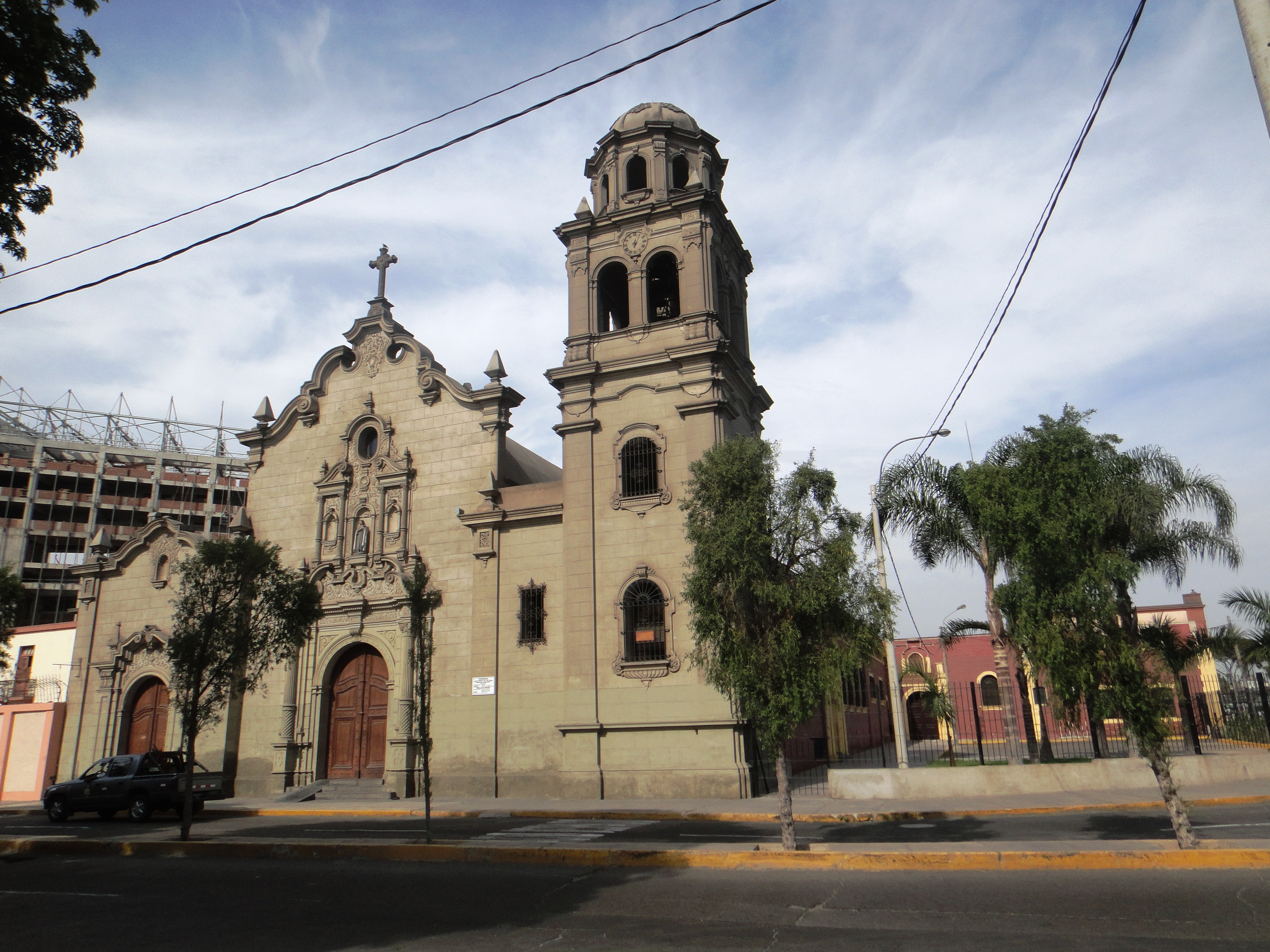
- The parish in 2011

Religion
- Affiliation: Catholic
- Rite: Roman Rite
- Ecclesiastical or organisational status: Parish
- Ownership: Archdiocese of Lima
- Governing body: Catholic Church in Peru
- Status: Active

Location
- Location: Santa Beatriz, Lima
- Country: Peru
- Interactive map of Saint Thérèse of the Child Jesus

Architecture
- Funded by: Augusto B. Leguía; Teresa Álvarez-Calderón
- General contractor: The Foundation Company
- Completed: 1946

The Parish of Saint Thérèse of the Child Jesus (Spanish: Parroquia de Santa Teresita del Niño Jesús) is a Catholic parish church located at the intersection of the fourth block of José Díaz street and Madre de Dios avenue in Santa Beatriz, a neighbourhood of Lima District in Lima, Peru. Located near the National Stadium of Peru, it was established by the Canons Regular of the Immaculate Conception, operating under the jurisdiction of the Archdiocese of Lima.

== History ==
The decision to build a new temple followed the demolition of the vice-parish dedicated to Our Lady of Guadalupe due to the construction of the Palace of Justice. The building was in charge of the Congregation of Canons Regular of the Immaculate Conception, who chose a nearby location as the site of the future parish. The congregation originally reached Peru in 1905, when a community was founded in Chachapoyas, after which they established themselves in Lima in 1908, where they took over the parish of Saint Simon and Saint Jude in Callao, and later in Ica, where a school and retreat were built.

Following negotiations between President Augusto B. Leguía and Teresa de la Cruz Candamo, daughter of former president of Peru Manuel Candamo and Teresa Álvarez-Calderón and founder of the Congregation of the Canonesses of the Cross, a plot of land was granted by Leguía in 1925, located next to the National Stadium, in the residential neighbourhood and former agricultural estate known as Santa Beatriz.

The first stone was laid on September 30 of the same year to commemorate the death of Thérèse of Lisieux, after whom the parish was named, in a ceremony attended by Leguía. Both Leguía and Álvarez-Calderón were sponsors. The parish's construction was overseen by engineer Alberto Jochamowitz and executed by the Foundation Company of Canada. Its tower was designed by Jochamowitz, while its construction was executed by engineer Eugenio Olivares. Financial difficulties led to community efforts to benefit the intermittent construction, such as that of the congregation's women's committees, who carried out various activities and managed to acquire 200,000 bricks gifted by the community. The building was ultimately completed in 1946, when its dome was finished.

A school of the same name was originally established by educator Rosa Victoria Palacios Tapia in 1913, who also served as its director.

=== Simplemente María ===
In 1969, the church was the location for episode 225 of the soap opera Simplemente María ("Simply María"), where the titular character (Saby Kamalich) married Esteban Pasciarotti (Braulio Castillo), her love interest. According to Ricardo Blume, an actor in the series, the series was so popular at the time that the Military Junta would suspend meetings to watch the broadcast.

The fictional wedding became the focus of both national and international attention, as it was controversially serviced by a real priest and attended by a crowd of 2,000 people at the church itself, with over 10,000 people present in the public square outside of the church, which made filming difficult and made necessary the presence of local police. Some members of the crowd were reported to have fainted, with many others crying. Series producer Vlado Radovich pointed out that there was some confusion as to whether the wedding was between the characters or the actors themselves, while the local press—such as notable newspaper Expreso—covered the event as fact. El Comercio released a retrospective report a year later titled Simplemente Absurdo ("Simply Absurd").

The priest that officiated the wedding, Teodoro Piscinelli, initially refused to perform the ceremony due to being forbidden to do so by the city's archbishop. Following a promise by one of the series' executive producers that PANTEL would repair the church's leaking roof, Piscinelli relented and allowed the event to happen. Due to the worldwide popularity of the event, the news reached Vatican City, and the Holy See removed Piscinelli from the city, being assigned to another country. He was eventually posted to a "small parish in the Amazon River basin" when last heard from, according to Radovich.

=== Recent history ===
The Archdiocese of Lima began administering the parish in 2005, prior to which it had served as the order's headquarters.

The National Stadium underwent renovations from 2010 to 2011, with a design that adapted to the parish and its convent, located adjacent to its southern side.

== See also ==
- National Stadium of Peru
