= Red Ink =

Red Ink may refer to:

- Red ink or rubrication, the addition of text in red ink to a manuscript for emphasis
- Red Ink (1960 film), a Hungarian romantic drama film
- Red Ink (2000 film), a Peruvian-Spanish crime drama film

== See also ==
- Red inkplant, or Phytolacca octandra
