= The Time of the Hero =

Novel by Mario Vargas Llosa

First Spanish edition (publ. Seix Barral)

The Time of the Hero (Original title: La ciudad y los perros, literally "The City and the Dogs") is a 1963 novel by Peruvian writer and Nobel laureate Mario Vargas Llosa. It was Vargas Llosa's first novel and is set among the cadets at the Leoncio Prado Military Academy in Lima, which he attended as a teenager. The novel portrays the school so scathingly that its leadership burned many copies and condemned the book as Ecuadorian propaganda against Peru.

It won the 1962 Premio Biblioteca Breve for best unpublished novel and the 1963 Premio de la Crítica Española. The novel has been widely acclaimed by literary experts. In 2006 it was included in the book 1001 Books You Must Read Before You Die. In 2008 it appeared on El Pais list "Favorite Books of 100 Spanish Authors". In 2013 it was included on The Daily Telegraph's list "500 Must Read Books".

== Style and themes ==
The novel is notable for its experimental and complex employment of multiple perspectives in a non-linear fashion. Its technique is influenced by William Faulkner's work, particularly the novel Light in August.

It is a story about adolescence and the transition of youths to manhood, but also portrays a microcosm of Peruvian society. It features themes such as masculinity, hierarchy, secrecy and the military.

== Plot summary ==
The story is set at the Leoncio Prado Military Academy, where adolescent and young boarders receive their secondary education under a regime of strict military discipline. Vargas Llosa critiques military culture and its way of life, in which specific values, such as aggression, bravery, masculinity, and sexuality, are actively fostered in a manner that stunts the personal development of the boys at the boarding school.

The central conflict of the story concerns the theft of an examination paper by the cadet Cava, carried out under orders from Jaguar, the brutal leader of a group of cadets called The Circle. The theft is reported by a lowly cadet called "The Slave," whom Jaguar consequently murders during military maneuvers. Concerned for the school's reputation, the administrators choose to ignore further evidence of Jaguar's guilt. However, a third cadet, "The Poet," attempts to expose The Jaguar. These events pit the cadets against one another, as well as against the school authorities.

== Background ==
The novel is based on Vargas Llosa's own experiences of Leoncio Prado Military Academy, which he attended as a teenager in the early 1950s. He worked on the manuscript for the novel while he was living in France and it was published as his first novel in 1962.

== Film adaptation ==
The novel was adapted into a 1985 film by Peruvian director Francisco Lombardi.
