= Rosas para Verónica =

- Genre: Telenovela; Romance; Drama
- Created by: Gloria Travesí
- Directed by: Carlos Barrios Porras
- Starring: Saby Kamalich; Ignacio López Tarso; Carlos Tuccio; Walter Rodriguez
- Country of origin: Peru
- Original language: Spanish
- No. of episodes: 102

Production
- Production location: Lima
- Running time: 60 minutes
- Production company: Producciones Panamericana

Original release
- Network: Panamericana Televisión
- Release: 1971 – 1971

Related
- El adorable profesor Aldao; Un verano para recordar

Rosas para Verónica (English title:Roses for Veronica) is a Peruvian telenovela by Producciones Panamericana and directed by Carlos Barrios Porras for Panamericana Televisión.

== Cast ==
- Saby Kamalich...Veronica
- Ignacio López Tarso...Ramiro
- Carlos Estrada
- Carlos Tuccio
- Walter Rodriguez
- Carola Duval
- Aracely Marquez
- Maria Cristina Ribal
- Maria Isabel Chiri
- Miguel Arnáiz
