= El renacer de Luna =

- Genre: Telenovela
- Based on: Morir para vivir by Félix B. Caignet
- Developed by: Jaime Sierra; Helena Aguilera
- Written by: Carlos Ruiz; Paulina González; José Adrián Mazoy
- Directed by: Sandra Schiffner; Luis Vélez
- Starring: Marisol del Olmo; Matías Novoa; Flavio Medina; Marlene Favela; Claudia Ramírez; Eduardo Zucchi; Mar Sordo; Graco Sendel; Jorge Luis Pila
- Theme music composer: Jorge Eduardo Murguía; Mauricio L. Arriaga
- Opening theme: "Estando aquí" by Yuri
- Composer: Berenice González
- Country of origin: Mexico
- Original language: Spanish
- No. of seasons: 1
- No. of episodes: 80

Production
- Executive producer: Roy Rojas
- Cinematography: Héctor Maeshiro
- Editors: Christopher Cruz; Víctor Manuel Quiroz; Noe Galindo
- Camera setup: Multi-camera
- Production company: TelevisaUnivision

Original release
- Network: Las Estrellas
- Release: 22 June – 9 October 2026

El renacer de Luna (English: Luna's Rebirth) is a Mexican telenovela produced by Roy Rojas for TelevisaUnivision. It is based on the 1989 Mexican telenovela Morir para vivir created by Félix B. Caignet. The series stars Marisol del Olmo, Matías Novoa and Mar Sordo. It aired on Las Estrellas from 22 June 2026 to 9 October 2026.

== Plot ==
Luna Arteaga is studying music in Los Angeles while pursuing her dream of becoming a singer. However, her life changes when she learns that her father in Mexico is seriously ill and that the mezcal estate, El Despertar, is facing the worst crisis in its history. Luna returns to Mexico, unaware that behind all the conflicts her family is facing lies a web of ambition, betrayals, and secrets sown over the years by Dalila Mondragón, the woman she always believed to be her mother. Luna enrolls at the Musiart Lab Academy, where she not only meets Saúl Duarte, a charming young man who will fight for her love no matter the consequences, but also a group of talented young people with whom she forms a band. Along the way, Luna will face situations that will change her destiny and lead her to discover secrets that could turn everything she thought she knew upside down.

Close to Luna's circle is Maya Mistral, a strong, modern woman who has protected her sons, Mael and Javi, from the violence inflicted by her husband, Pancho, until Sebastián, an honest and sensitive doctor, enters her life to bring her happiness once again. A mature and courageous love blossoms between them. However, the shadow of the secrets surrounding Maya and the constant threat from Pancho will put their relationship to the test, and they will have to risk everything to live their freedom together.

== Cast ==
=== Main ===
- Marisol del Olmo as Maya Mistral Álvarez
- Matías Novoa as Sebastián Castillejos Armenta
- Flavio Medina as Francisco "Pancho" Cadena Montoya
- Marlene Favela as Dalila Mondragón Urrutia
  - Victoria Arocho as young Dalila
  - Lily Kate Navarro as child Dalila
- Claudia Ramírez as Amalia Villarreal Rodríguez "Meche"
  - Thelma Madrigal as young Amalia
- Eduardo Zucchi as Saúl Duarte Lara
- Mar Sordo as Luna Arteaga Mondragón
- Graco Sendel as Rodrigo Torres Paz
- Jorge Luis Pila as Félix Torres Martínez
- Mauricio Henao as Federico Grajales Iturralde
- Sebastián Poza as Ismael "Mael" Cadena Mistral
- Ale Müller as Salma Córdoba Esparza
- Davi Ulloa as Jaime Alonso Balderas
- Ana Sofía Gatica as Yesenia Zarco Garza and Tara Zarco Garza
- Fabián Robles as Jacobo "Boco" Conrado Cadena Montoya
- Rocío Verdejo as Clementina Mondragón Méndez
  - Ana Paula Montessoro as young Clementina
  - Sofía Michelle as child Clementina
- Amaranta Ruíz as Theo Mezquite López
- Lalo Palacios as Calendario Cruz Gómez
- Gabriela Zamora as Francisca "Panchita" Limantour Villeneuve
- Laura Vignatti as Paola Ruiz
- Jorge Gallegos as José Castro Olvera
- Ricardo Silva as Dr. Claudio Valverde
- Sophia Venero as Gala Hernández Higuera
- Ale Bellón as Ligia Gasca Silva
- Renata Durán as Selene Castillejos
- Isabella Serdán as Erika Flores González
- Juan Pablo Velasco as Javier "Javi" Cadena Mistral
- René Casados as Leonardo "Leo" Ochoa Ramos
  - Alejandro Valencia as young Leo

=== Recurring and guest stars ===
- Omar Fierro as Armando Duarte
- Alejandro de la Madrid as Andrés Arteaga Villarreal
  - Andoni Belausteguigoitia as young Andrés
- Enrique Cueva as Odilón Vicente Chagala
- Abel Fernando as Abel Ordoñez Castañeda
- Enrique Amador as Dr. Salvador Salazar
- Polo Monárrez as Joel Vigorito
- Galilea Sandoval as Lupita Mezquite
- Yleana Dávila as Albina Lara
- Tony Grimaldi as Bertoldo
- Noah Flores as Luisito
- Chiara Henaro as Valeria
- Karolina Gutzce as Albertina
- Yuridia Verduzco as Tina
- Luna Scarella as Catalina
- Guada Espinoza as Mística
- Sergio Álvarez as Lawyer Linares
- Daniel Chávez as Jorge
- Arturo Alvar as Daniel
- Manuel Duarte as Sergio
- Indra Duarte as Gabriela
- Edgardo Delher as Victorio
- Lorena Bojorquez as Rocío

== Production ==
In January 2026, Marisol del Olmo, Matías Novoa and Mar Sordo were cast in starring roles, with Graco Sendel cast as an antagonist. In February 2026, Marlene Favela, Flavio Medina, Claudia Ramírez, René Casados, Jorge Luis Pila and Eduardo Zucchi joined the cast. Filming of the telenovela began on 12 March 2026.

== Ratings ==
Viewership and ratings per season of El renacer de Luna
Season	Timeslot (CT)	Episodes	First aired		Last aired		Avg. viewers (millions)
Season	Timeslot (CT)	Episodes	Date	Viewers (millions)	Date	Viewers (millions)	Avg. viewers (millions)
1	Mon–Fri 6:30 p.m.	78	22 June 2026	3.65	9 October 2026	3.87	3.41

== Episodes ==
No.	Title	Original release date	Mexico viewers (millions)
1	"El hombre que solías ser"	22 June 2026 (Note: Premiered early online through Las Estrellas website on 19 June 2026.)	3.65
2	"Para triunfar hay que ser valiente"	23 June 2026	3.48
3	"La oscuridad te sonrió"	24 June 2026	2.58
4	"El amor es un proceso imposible de detener"	25 June 2026	3.18
5	"Robaste mi canción"	26 June 2026	3.27
6	"Para el amor no hay cura"	29 June 2026	3.04
7	"Escucha la voz de tu corazón"	30 June 2026	1.94
8	"Mi voluntad sobre 'El Despertar'"	1 July 2026	3.40
9	"Me voy a casar con Rodrigo"	2 July 2026	3.40
10	"El elixir que quiero probar"	3 July 2026	3.36
11	"Me casaré con Rodrigo"	6 July 2026	3.00
12	"Ves la tormenta y no te hincas"	7 July 2026	3.64
13	"Debo proteger a mi hija de su propia madre"	8 July 2026	3.53
14	"¿Estás enamorado de mí?"	9 July 2026	3.48
15	"Eres una caja de Pandora"	10 July 2026	3.62
16	"Mi mamá ya sabe"	13 July 2026	3.32
17	"Tenemos que trabajar juntos"	14 July 2026	3.63
18	"Esto sí es mi culpa"	15 July 2026	3.19
19	"Está encadenada a mí"	16 July 2026	3.12
20	"Estábamos destinados a encontrarnos"	17 July 2026	3.44
21	"El tiempo pasa y no perdona"	20 July 2026	3.50
22	"Nunca dejes de cantar"	21 July 2026	3.19
23	"¡No me dejes, papá!"	22 July 2026	3.29
24	"Yo soy la dueña de este lugar"	23 July 2026	3.53
25	"¿De dónde conoce a mi papá?"	24 July 2026	3.15
26	"¡Teníamos un trato!"	27 July 2026	2.96
27	"Te confío mi herencia"	28 July 2026	3.14
28	"El amor puede quebrarse"	29 July 2026	3.41
29	"No jueges con fuego"	30 July 2026	3.54
30	"¡Deja de difamar a mi mamá!"	31 July 2026	3.64
31	"Jugar su propio juego"	3 August 2026	3.54
32	"Luna no puede saberlo"	4 August 2026	3.46
33	"Tu corazón está fallando"	5 August 2026	3.74
34	"Un bastardo con derecho a todo"	6 August 2026	3.68
35	"Despertar juntos al éxito"	7 August 2026	3.37
36	"El tiempo que le queda de vida"	10 August 2026	3.05
37	"Nunca pude olvidarte"	11 August 2026	3.20
38	"El Despertar es tuyo"	12 August 2026	3.26
39	"No puedo vivir sin ella"	13 August 2026	N/A
40	"Lo nuestro es destino"	14 August 2026	3.36
41	"Quédate en mi cama"	17 August 2026	3.26
42	"No derrumbes lo nuestro"	18 August 2026	N/A
43	"Esta paz tiene tu nombre"	19 August 2026	2.87
44	"¡De mí no se van a burlar!"	20 August 2026	3.40
45	"Jamás conocerás el amor"	21 August 2026	2.84
46	"Sé feliz por los dos"	24 August 2026	3.29
47	"Busco un talento como el tuyo"	25 August 2026	3.22
48	"El amor ya no es suficiente"	26 August 2026	3.51
49	"Que nuestro amor no se contamine"	27 August 2026	3.45
50	"¡Ya no soy una niña!"	28 August 2026	2.85
51	"Bienvenida a mi hacienda"	31 August 2026	3.55
52	"Morir para vivir"	1 September 2026	3.46
53	"Se protege a quien se ama"	2 September 2026	3.65
54	"Necesito parecerme a ella"	3 September 2026	3.83
55	"Nadie va a escuchar sus gritos"	4 September 2026	3.58
56	"Un don envenenado"	7 September 2026	3.34
57	"Querías guerra, ¿no?"	8 September 2026	3.09
58	"¡Te voy a hundir!"	9 September 2026	3.57
59	"Los sueños no se cumplen, se construyen"	10 September 2026	3.66
60	"El karma te alcanzó"	11 September 2026	3.28
61	"La sangre llama"	14 September 2026	3.72
62	"Una boda trágica"	15 September 2026	3.05
63	"Quiero que me traiciones"	16 September 2026	3.77
64	"Nadie escapa a su destino"	17 September 2026	3.40
65	"Los muertos no lloran"	18 September 2026	3.78
66	"Me voy a vengar de ti, Dalila"	21 September 2026	3.43
67	"Controla tus emociones"	22 September 2026	3.40
68	"Cosechas el mal que sembraste"	23 September 2026	3.77
69	"Aquí empieza mi venganza"	24 September 2026	4.83
70	"Una traición al destino"	25 September 2026	3.61
71	"Ojo por ojo"	28 September 2026	3.98
72	"Nunca perdiste la memoria"	29 September 2026	3.81
73	"Por amor se rompe la profecía"	30 September 2026	3.48
74	"¡Nadie se mete con Dalila Mondragón!"	1 October 2026	3.52
75	"Tú no mandas en El Despertar"	2 October 2026	3.34
76	"Yo no juego, yo ejecuto"	5 October 2026	3.55
77	"Ustedes no pueden detenerme"	6 October 2026	3.40
78	"No tengo perdón de Dios"	7 October 2026	3.58
79	"¡Fuera del Despertar!"	8 October 2026	3.92
80	"Un nuevo comienzo"	9 October 2026	3.87

== Music ==
El Renacer de Luna

Soundtrack album by Various artists
- Released: 7 August 2026
- Length: 42:02
- Label: Fonarte Latino

The soundtrack to the series was released by Fonarte Latino on 7 August 2026.

All tracks are written by J. Eduardo Murguía and Mauricio L. Arriaga.

No.	Title	Performer(s)	Length
1.	"Estoy bien"	Mar Sordo; Eduardo Zucchi; Ana Sofía Gatica; Ale Müller; Ale Bellón; Davi Ulloa; Sebastián Poza	3:41
2.	"Mi mejor momento"	Sordo; Zucchi	3:23
3.	"Un nuevo ciclo"	Sordo; Zucchi; Gatica; Müller; Bellón; Ulloa; Poza	3:57
4.	"Tan solo recuerda"	Sordo; Zucchi; Gatica; Müller; Bellón; Ulloa; Poza	3:44
5.	"Libre para amar"	Müller; Bellón	3:22
6.	"Si estamos juntos"	Sordo; Zucchi; Gatica; Müller; Bellón; Ulloa; Poza	4:15
7.	"Que necesito un nuevo amor"	Sordo; Gatica; Müller; Bellón	3:35
8.	"Quédate conmigo"	Gatica	3:42
9.	"Aunque me tiemble el corazón"	Sordo; Zucchi; Gatica; Müller; Bellón; Ulloa; Poza	4:29
10.	"Todo lo que tengo"	Zucchi; Ulloa; Poza	3:25
11.	"Como no decirte gracias"	Zucchi; Gatica; Müller; Bellón; Ulloa; Poza	4:29
Total length:			42:02
