= Jorge Chiarella Krüger =

Peruvian journalist (1943–2021)

Jorge Chiarella Krüger (1 November 1943 – 1 April 2021) was a Peruvian actor and theatre director.

== Biography ==
Krüger was the son of Jorge Chiarella Füller and the pianist Natalia Kruger Mora. He married the playwright, educator and actress Celeste Viale Yerovi. He was the father of the theater director Mateo Chiarella Viale.

He has been linked to the theater since 1961, when he founded the Theater of the Catholic University of Peru (TUC) together with Ricardo Blume. He was director of the Theater of the National University of Engineering (1967-9), a member of the Association of Amateur Artists (AAA), director of the Telba theater group (1973-9) and founder and director of Alondra theater group (1981). He carried out various theatrical activities: as a director, actor, composer of incidental music, specialist in sound effects and promotion of theatrical events, acting and directing teacher. He was also assistant director of Ricardo Blume and Atahualpa del Cioppo, and co-author of works for children, managing for two years the children's television program La casa de cardboard.

He also participated as an actor in several films in his country, and in Walter Salles' Motorcycle Diaries.

He died in Lima on April 1, 2021, at the age of 77, from COVID-19.

== Filmography ==
Year	Title	Role	Notes
1994	Sin compasión	Mayor Portillo	
1999	Coraje	Pascual	
2001	El bien esquivo	Alcalde de Corte	
2002	Muerto de amor	Don Máximo	
2003	Ojos que no ven	Dr. Pacheco	
2003	Polvo enamorado	Padre Esteban	
2004	The Motorcycle Diaries	Dr. Bresciani	(Peru)
2016	La Última Noticia		
2019	Rapto	Hombre Mayor	(final film role)
