= Mariella Trejos =

Colombian-Peruvian actress (1948–2023)

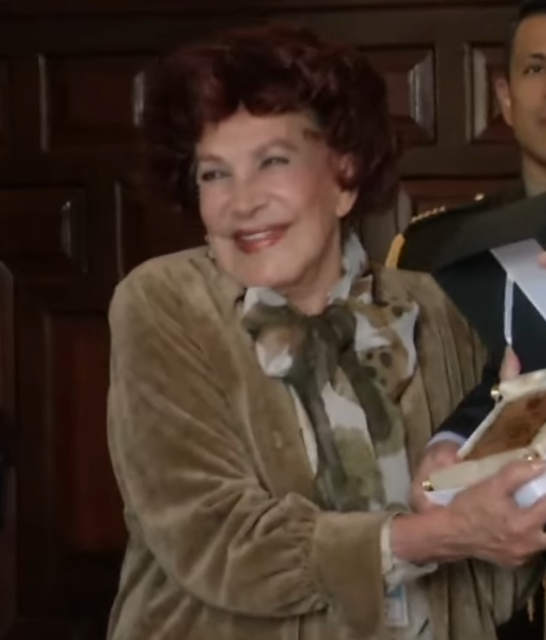
- Born: 22 July 1948; Cali, Colombia
- Died: 27 August 2023 (aged 75); Lima, Peru
- Occupation: Actress

Mariella Trejos Benítez (22 July 1948 – 27 August 2023) was a Colombian-Peruvian actress. She starred in movies and musicals, as well as in several Peruvian telenovelas, including Torbellino, Carmín, Simplemente María, Asi es la vida, and Al fondo hay sitio.

Benítez was recognized as a Meritorious Personality of Culture for her valuable contribution to the Peruvian theater, by the Ministry of Culture. Her career spanned more than fifty years.

== Career ==
After completing her studies, Trejos began to look for artistic works. She moved to Bogotá, where she was living with her cousin, while searching for a role in a play. After a hectic period, she auditioned for an international Mexican comedy troupe and got in. In doing so, she got an opportunity to travel through some Latin American countries. However, due to problems and the delinquency of her own representative, her cast (including herself) was stranded in Buenos Aires, where she was eventually convinced to go live in Peru. She moved there permanently in 1964.

Initially, Trejos worked as a model for contests in humorous sketches, sharing the set with characters such as Tulio Loza; she was also an actress in radionovelas. In 1965, she was hired by Panamericana Televisión, for four years she moved in complementary roles in series with modest success. Then in 1969, Trejos landed one of the main characters in the channel's new proposal, Simplemente María, a resoundingly successful telenovela on the South American continent, which increased her celebrity status.

In 1984, Trejos played a role of Violeta Ramos in telenovela Carmín. Three years later she participated in her second film, La fuga del Chacal, which was a box office success in Peru.

== Death ==
Trejos suffered from bedsores and severe gastritis, and died on 27 August 2023, at the age of 75.

== Selected filmography ==
- Simplemente María (1969)
- Without Compassion (1994)
- Todo sobre Camila (2002)
- Al fondo hay sitio (2011)
