= Susana Dosamantes =

Mexican actress (1948–2022)

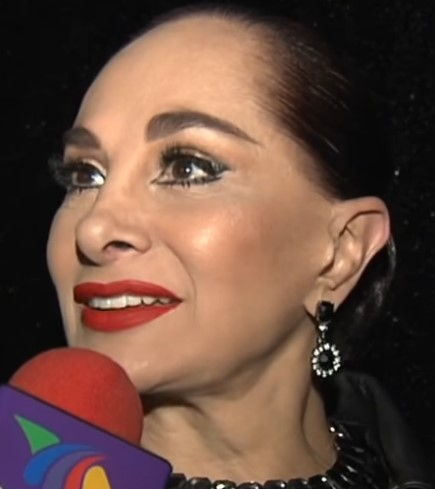
- Dosamantes in 2017
- Born: María del Perpetuo Socorro Guadalupe Susana Dosamantes Rul Riestra; 9 January 1948; Guadalajara, Jalisco, Mexico
- Died: 2 July 2022 (aged 74); Miami, Florida, U.S.
- Occupation: Actress
- Years active: 1968–2022
- Spouses: Enrique Rubio González (m. 1969; div. 1974); Carlos Vasallo Tomé (m. 1974; div. 1988); Luis Rivas (m. 1988)
- Children: Paulina Rubio Dosamantes; Enrique Rubio Dosamantes-Rul

María del Perpetuo Socorro Guadalupe Susana Dosamantes Rul Riestra (9 January 1948 – 2 July 2022), known professionally as Susana Dosamantes (Spanish pronunciation: [suˈsana ðosaˈmantes]), was a Mexican actress. She won the 1990 TVyNovelas Best Antagonist Actress award for her role in the 1989 telenovela, Morir para vivir.

From 1968 onwards, she worked in around 50 movies and television series, including a number of Spanish-language soap operas. She starred in the films Rio Lobo, Day of the Assassin and Hit Man, and also starred in the hit telenovelas Eva Luna, Tres veces Ana and Si nos dejan.

== Personal life ==
María del Perpetuo Socorro Guadalupe Susana Dosamantes Rul Riestra was born on 9 January 1948 in Guadalajara, Mexico. She was the daughter of Mario Dosamantes Rul and María Elena Susana Riestra Alcaraz.

She is the mother of Mexican pop diva Paulina Rubio.

== Death ==
Dosamantes died on 2 July 2022 at the age of 74, due to pancreatic cancer.

== Filmography ==
Film roles
Year	Title	Role	Notes
1969	Los recuerdos del porvenir	Julia Andrade	
1970	Remolino de pasiones	Gaby	
1970	Flor de durazno	María	
1970	Paraíso	Amiga de Vicky	
1970	Rio Lobo	María Carmen	
1971	Siete Evas para un Adan	Betty	
1972	Kalimán, el hombre increíble	Nila	
1973	La yegua colorada	Isabel Fuentes	
1974	Jalisco nunca pierde	Alejandra	
1975	Más negro que la noche	Aurora	
1976	El hombre	Martha	
1979	Day of the Assassin	The Princess	
1981	El sexo de los ricos	Diana	
1982	Hit Man	Laura	
1983	El día del compadre	Bertha	
1986	Escuadrón	Roxana	
1990	La metralleta	Diana "La metralleta"	
1990	La ley de la mafia	Dinorah	
1990	El estrangulador de la rosa	Paola Luna	
1990	Comando marino	Comandanta	
2012	El arribo de Conrado Sierra	Doña Josefa	
2018	El fantasma de mi novia	Abuela María	

Television roles
Year	Title	Role	Notes
1971	Muchacha italiana viene a casarse		
1972	Las gemelas		
1972	El carruaje	Concepción	
1972	El edificio de enfrente	Celia	
1973	La hiena	Dayanara	
1974	Ana del aire	Norma	
1974–1976	El chofer	Pilar	
1975	A Home of Our Own	Magdalena (adult)	Television film
1975	Lo imperdonable	Ángela Fonseca Flores	Series regular
1977	Corazón salvaje	Aimee	Series regular
1978	María José		
1980	Aprendiendo a amar	Teresa	20 episodes
1981	Infamia	Lidia Santana	Main role
1983	Amalia Batista	Amalia Batista	Main role; 265 episodes
1989	Morir para vivir	Rosaura Guzmán de Iturralde	Series regular
1997	Amada enemiga	Regina Proal de Quijano	Main role
2003	Rebeca	Matilde Linares	Series regular
2005	El Amor no Tiene Precio	Lucrecia Cevallos	Series regular
2006	Marina	Alberta Morales de Alarcón	Series regular
2008	El juramento	Luisa Robles Conde	Series regular
2010	Eva Luna	Marcela Arismendi	Series regular
2011–2012	Corazón apasionado	Úrsula Campos Miranda de Villacastín "La Generala"	Series regular; 111 episodes
2016	Tres veces Ana	Ernestina Rivadeneira	Series regular; 108 episodes
2017	El vuelo de la victoria	Gloria Santibáñez	Guest role; 25 episodes
2021	Si nos dejan	Eva "Tita" Montiel	Series regular
