= Leoncio Prado Gutiérrez =

Peruvian soldier and adventurer

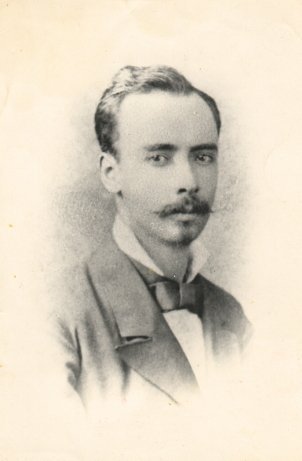
- Born: August 24, 1853; Huánuco, Peru
- Died: July 15, 1883 (aged 29); Huamachuco, Peru
- Military career
- Allegiance: Peru; Cuba
- Branch: Peruvian Navy; Mambí Army
- Service years: 1863–1883
- Rank: Colonel
- Conflicts: Peruvian civil war of 1867; Chincha Islands War; Ten Years' War; War of the Pacific

Leoncio Prado Gutiérrez (25 August 1853 – 15 July 1883) was a Peruvian soldier and adventurer who participated in various military actions against Spain; in Cuba and the Philippines in the 1870s. He also participated in other wars such as the Chincha Islands War (1865–1866) and the War of the Pacific (1879–1883), dying in the latter.

== Biography ==
From an early age he was attracted to the military career. His father, who at that time was the commander of the Lanceros de la Unión regiment (Union Lancers Regiment), allowed him to enter that military corps at the age of 8 years, having the rank of corporal at 9 years old. In 1865 he participated in the victorious revolution led by his father against President Juan Antonio Pezet. After the war he began studies at the College of Our Lady of Guadalupe.

At the age of thirteen he left his school to fight against the Spaniards in the squadron that sailed to the south of Chile and participated in the Battle of Abtao, where he was promoted to guardiamarina. Then he participated in the Battle of Callao in 1866 and was then promoted to the rank of ensign.

At the age of 21, he went to Cuba to participate in the fight for the independence of the Caribbean country. There he became a soldier of the so-called Ten Years' War. He then fought under the orders of Máximo Gómez and alongside leaders such as Antonio Maceo Grajales and José Maceo, Guillermo Moncada and others on the Eastern front.

In November 1876, almost without weapons or ammunition, Leoncio Prado and ten other men captured the Spanish steam Moctezuma, with the objective of taking the war to the sea. He raised the Cuban flag on the ship and renamed it Céspedes. He was pursued by several Spanish warships and after a time of persecution he was forced to self-sink his ship. Due to his actions in the war, he was granted the rank of colonel of the Cuban army.

In 1877, he organized an expedition with the aim of achieving the independence of the Philippines from Spain, but the attempt failed because his ship sank in a storm near China, from which he managed to save himself.

When Leoncio Prado was 26 years old, the war with Chile broke out in 1879, the so-called War of the Pacific, so the young officer returned to Peru to defend his country. He participated in the Navy and later in the Army. First, he was entrusted with the organization of a torpedo boat that was to act on the island of Alacrán in the port of Arica against the Chilean naval forces. Later, integrating the Army of the South in 1880, he was commissioned to form a military body with which he participated in the Battle of Tacna in May. Following the Peruvian defeat in that battle, he led a Guerrilla warfare around Tacna, until he was captured by the Chileans at Tatara in July. But then he was released on condition of not fighting in the war again, which he did not comply with. He later participated in the Sierra campaign, dying shortly after the Battle of Huamachuco in 1883.

The Leoncio Prado Military Academy is named after him.
