= Without Compassion =

1994 film

- Theatrical release poster
- Directed by: Francisco José Lombardi
- Screenplay by: Augusto Cabada
- Based on: Crime and Punishment by Fyodor Dostoyevsky
- Produced by: Francisco José Lombardi; Gustavo Sánchez
- Starring: Diego Bertie
- Cinematography: Pili Flores-Guerra
- Edited by: Luis Barrios
- Release dates: 20 May 1994 (Cannes); 7 December 1994 (France)
- Running time: 120 minutes
- Countries: Peru; Mexico; France
- Language: Spanish

Without Compassion (Spanish: Sin compasión) is a 1994 drama film directed by Francisco José Lombardi from a screenplay written by Augusto Cabada. It is based on the 1866 novel Crime and Punishment by Fyodor Dostoyevsky. It was screened in the Un Certain Regard section at the 1994 Cannes Film Festival. The film was selected as the Peruvian entry for the Best Foreign Language Film at the 67th Academy Awards, but was not accepted as a nominee.

== Cast ==
- Diego Bertie as Ramón Romano
- Adriana Dávila as Sonia Martinez
- Jorge Chiarella as Mayor Portillo
- Marcello Rivera as Julian Razuri
- Ricardo Fernández as Leandro Martinez
- Carlos Oneto as Priest
- Hernán Romero as Alejandro Velaochaga
- Mariella Trejos as Señora Aliaga
- Humberto Modenesi as Señor Aliaga
- Juan Jose Criados as Nico
- Isabel Solari as Paula
- Mónica Domínguez as Journalist

== Awards and nominations ==
- Havana Film Festival: Best Actor (Diego Berti) (Won)
- Goya Awards :Best Spanish Language Foreign Film (Nominated)

== See also ==
- List of submissions to the 67th Academy Awards for Best Foreign Language Film
- List of Peruvian submissions for the Academy Award for Best Foreign Language Film
