= Irresistible Seducers =

- Theatrical release poster
- Seductores irresistibles
- Directed by: Jorge E. Velarde; Rodrigo Viaggio
- Screenplay by: Rodrigo Viaggio; JC. Montoya
- Story by: Rodrigo Viaggio
- Produced by: Karol de la Borda; Rodrigo Viaggio
- Starring: Hernán Romero
- Cinematography: Marco Alvarado
- Edited by: Jorge E. Velarde; Rodrigo Viaggio; Renato Ortega
- Production company: Valori Films
- Distributed by: West Bay
- Release date: June 9, 2022
- Running time: 95 minutes
- Country: Peru
- Language: Spanish

Irresistible Seducers (Spanish: Seductores irresistibles) is a 2022 Peruvian comedy film directed by Jorge E. Velarde and Rodrigo Viaggio in their directorial debut. It stars Hernán Romero accompanied by Viaggio, Jose Dammert, Jesús Neyra and Jean Franco Vertiz. The story follows four friends who struggle to find girlfriends, so they seek the help of a seduction sensei.

== Synopsis ==
Giacomo Casanova is a seduction sensei who helps Arturo, who girls always ignore; Renzo, a former model struggling in his relationship; Camilo, supported by his older brother, but wants to meet girls; and Joaquim, an enthusiast who wants to learn his master's secrets.

== Cast ==
- Hernán Romero as Giacomo Casanova

=== La cruda verdad ===
- Jean Franco Vertiz as Joaquim de Almeida
- Paloma Yerovi as Pamela Crovetti
- Karol de la Borda as Francesca
- Laura Chirinos as Susana
- Edgar Pariona as Chato Bartender
- Turby Risco as Waiter
- Renzo Panduro Durand as "El Gilero Agarrado"

=== La prueba ===
- Jesús Neyra as Renzo Castellares
- Rodrigo Viaggio as Camilo Castellares
- Ingrid Altamirano as Fatima
- Haydée Cáceres as Bitter Old Woman
- Marale Rodríguez as Samantha "Sami"
- Urpi Gibbons as Neighbor Nora
- Fabiola Corcelles as Kiara, Nora's partner
- Issa Ringgold as Priscilla
- Ysolinne Huerta as Regina
- Niko Fantinato as Butler Henry
- Carola Mazzel as Margaret "Sugar Mommy"
- Connie Chaparro as Charlotte

=== Al maestro con cariño ===
- José Dammert as Arturo Seinfeld
- Jesús Delayeaui as Pedro, Arturo's stepfather
- Laura Borlini as Elvira, Arturo's mother
- Kukuli Morante as La YouTuber
- JC. Montoya as El Pesado de Carlos
- Hylenne Escalona as El Pesado de Carlos Lover
- Arlees Mellet as Tunez
- Maf Valega as Penelope
- Angela Mesa as Saleswoman
- Airam Galliani as Crazy Bar Lounge Girl
- Vania Accinelli as Romina
- Carlos Márquez asFriend of Carlos "El Veneco" Nightclub
- Sergio Velarde as Arturo's Dead Dad

== Release ==
Irresistible Seducers was scheduled to be released on June 2, 2022, in Peruvian theaters, but was delayed until June 9 of the same year. Then, it was released on July 28, 2023, in Spanish theaters.

== Box office ==
The film lasted a week in theaters, selling 5,340 tickets.

== Sequel ==
In mid-2023, a sequel titled Irresistible Seducers 2 was confirmed, with principal photography completed at the end of November 2024.
