= 8th TVyNovelas Awards =

1990 Mexican TV awards

- Date: April 2, 1990
- Location: Centro de Espectáculos “Premier“, México D.F.
- Hosted by: Joaquín Cordero & Roxana Saucedo

Highlights
- Most awards: Mi segunda madre (6)
- Most nominations: Mi segunda madre (10)

Television/radio coverage
- Network: Canal de las Estrellas
- Produced by: Raúl Velasco

The 8th TVyNovelas Awards were an academy of special awards to the best soap operas and TV shows. The awards ceremony took place on April 2, 1990 in Centro de Espectáculos “Premier“, México D.F. The ceremony was televised in Mexico by Canal de las Estrellas.

Joaquín Cordero and Roxana Saucedo hosted the show. Mi segunda madre won 6 awards, the most for the evening, including Best Telenovela. Other winners Dulce desafío and La casa al final de la calle won 4 awards, Teresa won 3 awards, also including Best Telenovela, Carrusel won 2 awards and Lo blanco y lo negro and Morir para vivir won 1 each.

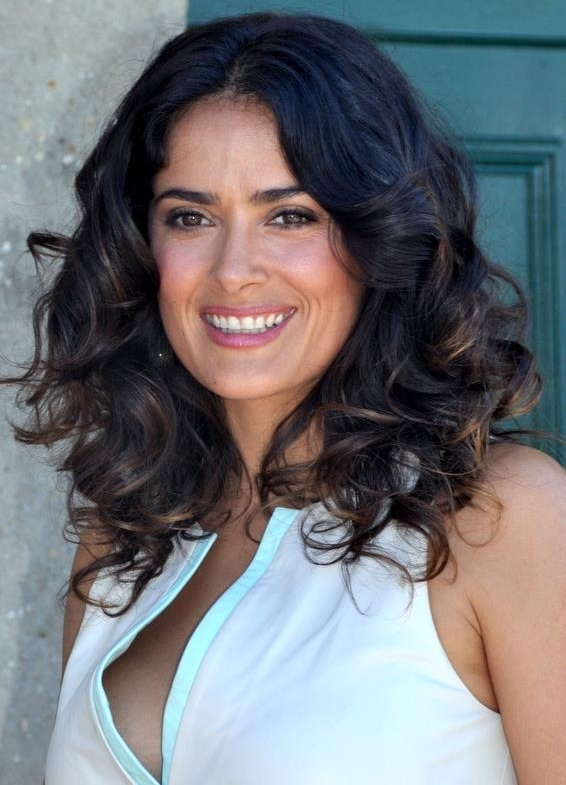
Salma Hayek, winner for Best Female Revelation.

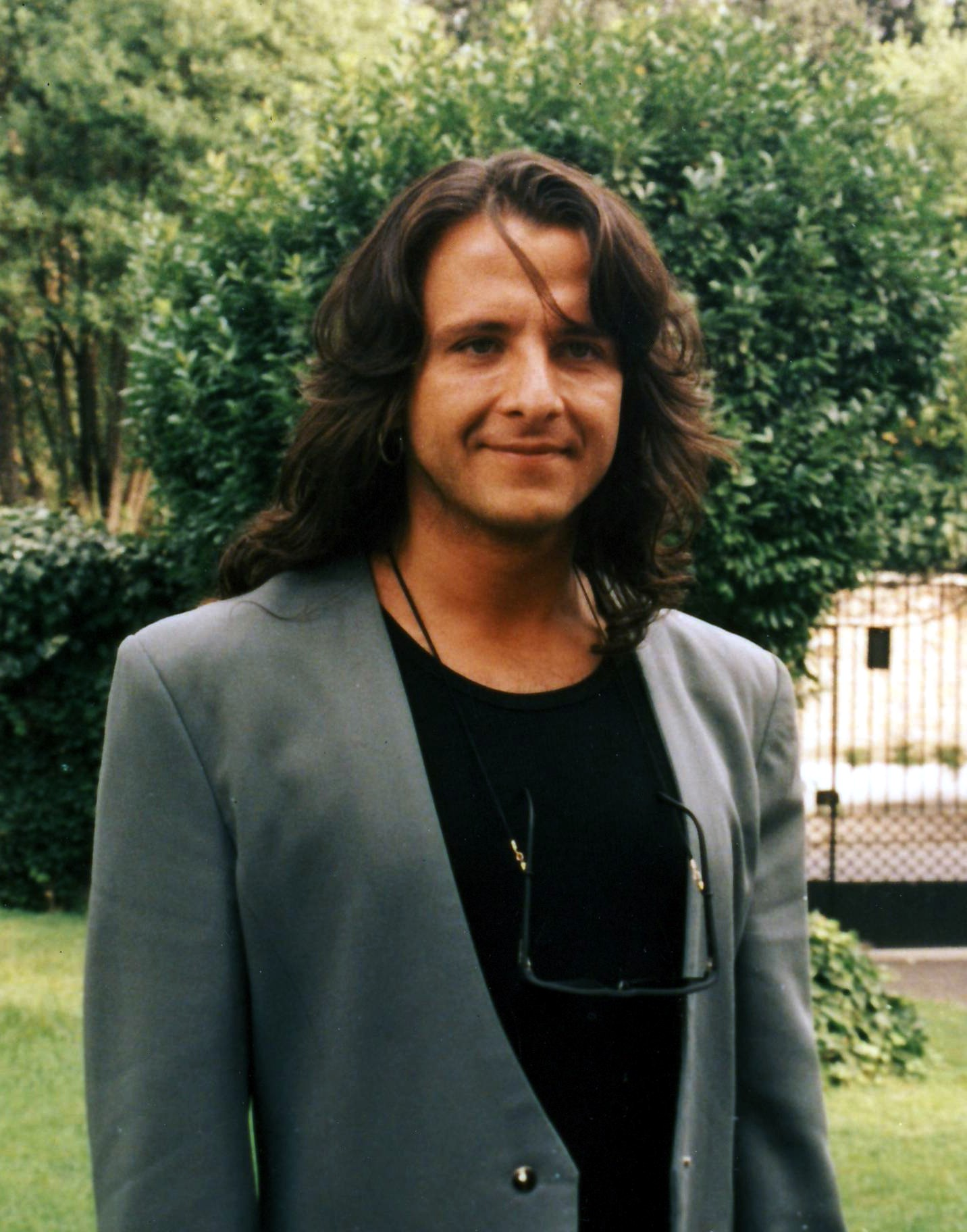
Eduardo Palomo, winner for Best Male Revelation.

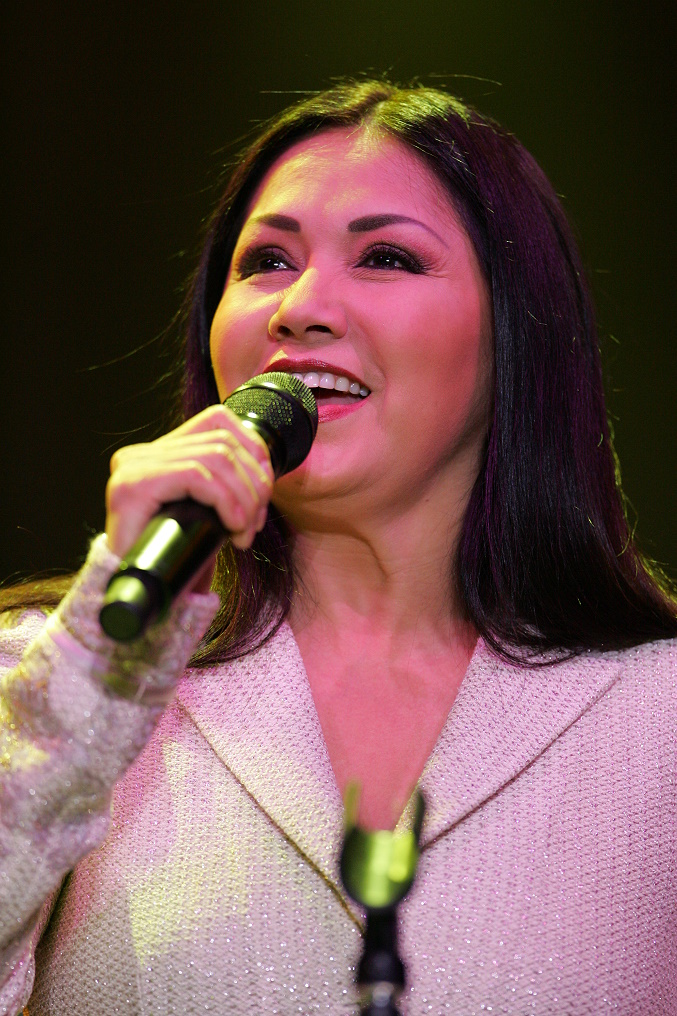
Ana Gabriel, winner for Best Female TV-Singer.

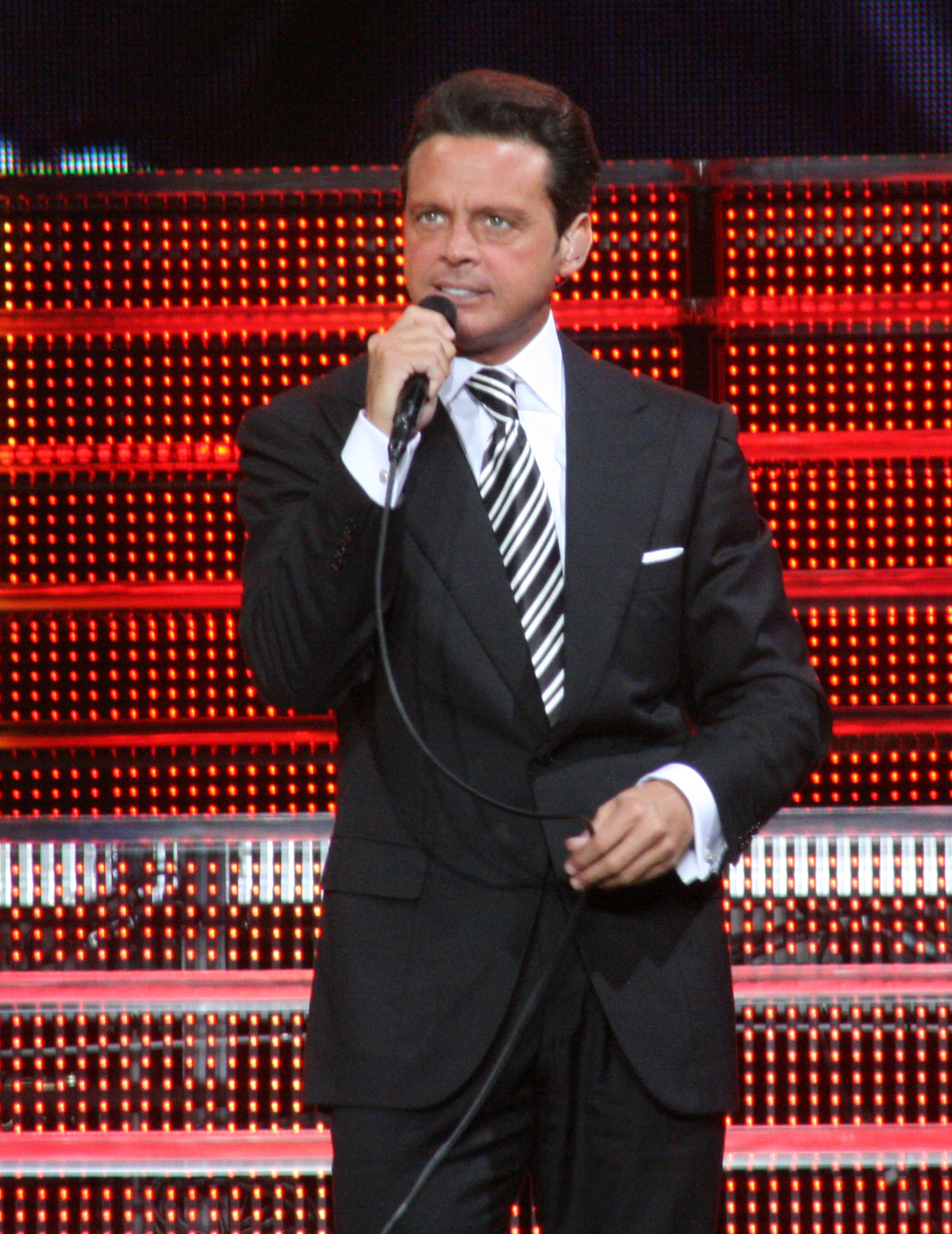
Luis Miguel, winner for Best Male TV-Singer.

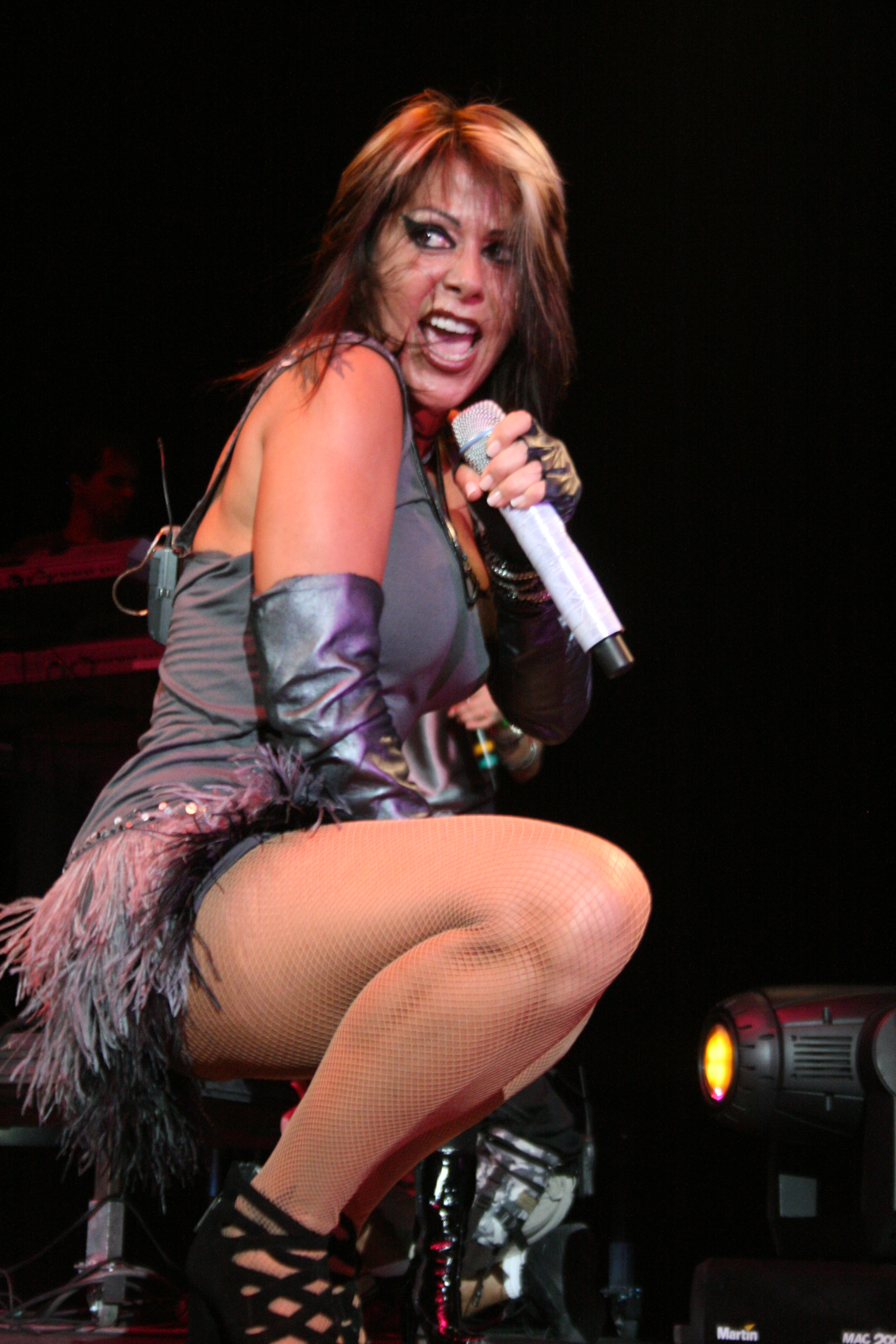
Alejandra Guzmán, winner for Revelation as a TV-Singer.

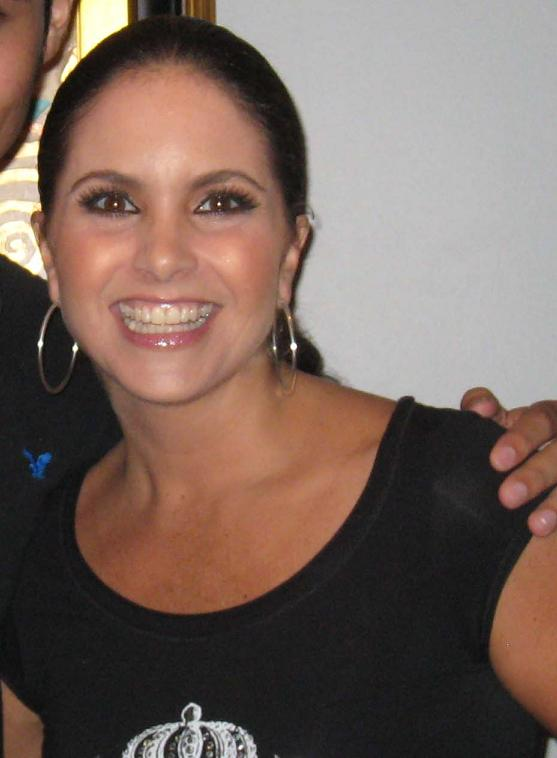
Lucero, awarded with 2 Special Awards for Best Young Singer and Most Beautiful Female Hair.

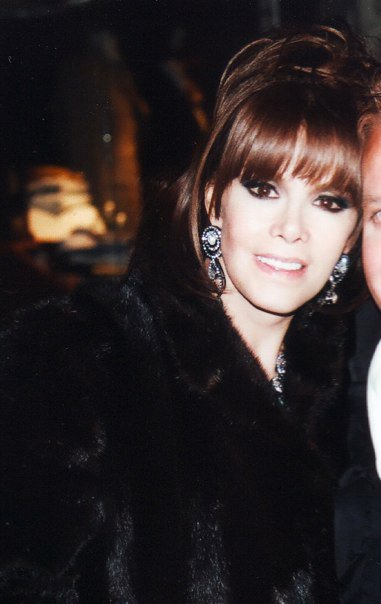
Lucía Méndez, awarded with a Special Award for her Career as an Actress.

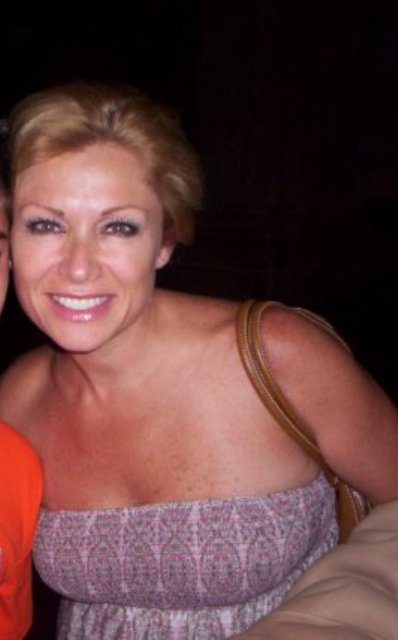
Leticia Calderón, awarded with a Special Award for Most Beautiful Smile in Telenovelas.

== Summary of awards and nominations ==
Telenovela	Nominations	Awards
Mi segunda madre	10	6
Dulce desafío	9	4
La casa al final de la calle	7	4
Teresa	7	3
Simplemente María	3	0
Carrusel	2	2
Lo blanco y lo negro	2	1
Morir para vivir	1	1

== Winners and nominees ==
=== Telenovelas ===
Best Telenovela	Best Production
Mi segunda madre; Teresa; Dulce desafío	Juan Osorio – La casa al final de la calle
Best Actress	Best Actor
María Sorté – Mi segunda madre; Angélica Aragón – La casa al final de la calle; Victoria Ruffo – Simplemente María	Héctor Bonilla – La casa al final de la calle; Enrique Novi – Mi segunda madre; Manuel Saval – Simplemente María
Best Antagonist Actress	Best Antagonist Actor
Susana Dosamantes – Morir para vivir; Alejandra Maldonado – Mi segunda madre; Gabriela Goldsmith – Simplemente María	Fernando Ciangherotti – Mi segunda madre; José Alonso – La casa al final de la calle; Sergio Klainer – Dulce desafío
Best Leading Actress	Best Leading Actor
Patricia Reyes Spíndola – Teresa; Beatriz Aguirre – Dulce desafío; Elsa Aguirre – Lo blanco y lo negro	Ernesto Alonso – Lo blanco y lo negro; Claudio Brook – Teresa; Enrique Lizalde – Dulce desafío
Best Young Lead Actress	Best Young Lead Actor
Adela Noriega – Dulce desafío; Daniela Castro – Mi segunda madre; Patricia Pereyra – Teresa	Eduardo Yáñez – Dulce desafío; Guillermo García Cantú – La casa al final de la calle; Miguel Pizarro – Teresa
Best Female Revelation	Best Male Revelation
Salma Hayek – Teresa; Ana Patricia Rojo – Dulce desafío; Chantal Andere – Dulce desafío	Eduardo Palomo – La casa al final de la calle; Alfredo Adame – Mi segunda madre; Rafael Rojas – Teresa

=== Other Awards ===
Best Debut Actress	Best Debut Actor
Chantal Andere – Dulce desafío	Alfredo Adame – Mi segunda madre
Best Child Actress	Best Child Actor
Ludwika Paleta – Carrusel	Jorge Granillo – Carrusel
Best Direction	Best Direction of the Cameras
Jorge Fons – La casa al final de la calle	Alejandro Frutos – Mi segunda madre
Best Original Story or Adaptation
Eric Vonn – Mi segunda madre

=== Comedy and Variety Programs ===
Best Comedy Program	Best Musical and Variety Program
Los comediantes	Siempre en domingo
Best Comedy Actress	Best Comedy Actor
Anabel Ferreira – ¡Anabel!	Jorge Ortiz de Pinedo – Dr. Cándido Pérez
Best Hostess	Best Host
Verónica Castro – Aquí está ...!	Raúl Velasco – Siempre en domingo
Revelation as a Hostess	Best Young Singer
Rebecca de Alba	Lucero
Best Female TV-Singer	Best Male TV-Singer
Ana Gabriel	Luis Miguel
Revelation as a TV-Singer	International Revelation as a TV-Singer
Alejandra Guzmán	Pablo Ruiz

=== Special awards ===
- Career as an Actress: Lucía Méndez
- Career as an Actor: Adalberto Martínez "Resortes"
- Career as a Comedian: Roberto Gómez Bolaños
- Most Beautiful Female Hair: Lucero
- Most Beautiful Male Hair: Eduardo Yáñez
- Most Beautiful Smile in Telenovelas: Leticia Calderón

=== Awards delivered after the show ===
Delivered by popular vote, after the transmission of the awards ceremony on TV

- Most Elegant Woman: Lola Beltrán
