= Fallen from Heaven =

1990 film

- Film poster
- Directed by: Francisco José Lombardi
- Screenplay by: Augusto Cabada; Giovanna Pollarolo
- Story by: Francisco José Lombardi
- Based on: Los gallinazos sin plumas by Julio Ramón Ribeyro
- Starring: Elide Brero
- Release dates: 3 September 1990 (MWFF); 1 November 1990 (Peru)
- Running time: 121 minutes
- Countries: Peru; Spain
- Language: Spanish

Fallen from Heaven (Spanish: Caídos del cielo) is a 1990 drama film directed by Francisco José Lombardi. The film was selected as the Peruvian entry for the Best Foreign Language Film at the 63rd Academy Awards, but was not accepted as a nominee.

== Plot ==
Set in Lima, the capital of Peru, at the end of the 1980s. The time is characterised as a period of political instability, severe economic crisis and violence related to the Internal conflict in Peru.

In this film three stories are intertwined, whose characters belong to three different generations. One of the stories is Lizandro and Cucha's, an elderly couple who have lost their only child. Owners of several properties, their time is dedicated to collecting their tenants' rent; all their efforts are concentrated on constructing having a mausoleum designed for their deceased child.

The next story is about Humberto, a successful radio broadcaster whose programme gives hope to people. Humberto is a lonely man with a facial deformity as a consequence of an accident. He gives shelter to a depressive woman that he calls "Veronica", after rescuing her from an attempting to commit suicide by jumping off a cliff. She has an ugly scar on her stomach which deters her from having intimacy with men.

Last is the story of a blind woman called Meche, who lives in a humble hut near a cliff, with her grandsons, whom she exploits and mistreats, obliging them to go the dumps to collect food to feed "Campeón", a pig recently given as a gift by Lizandro and Cucha. Meche plans to get money by selling the animal to be able to pay for a cure for her blindness. This last story is based on the Peruvian tale "Los gallinazos sin plumas", written by Julio Ramón Ribeyro.

== Cast ==
- Elide Brero
- Gustavo Bueno
- Rafael Garay
- Carlos Gassols
- Marisol Palacios
- Delfina Paredes
- Nelson Ruiz

== See also ==
- List of submissions to the 63rd Academy Awards for Best Foreign Language Film
- List of Peruvian submissions for the Academy Award for Best Foreign Language Film
