= Markéta =

Markéta is a feminine Czech given name, equivalent to English Margaret. Notable people with the name include:

- Markéta Hajdu (born 1974), Czech hammer thrower
- Markéta Irglová (born 1988), Czech musician and actress
- Markéta Jánská (born 1981), Czech model
- Markéta Pekarová Adamová (born 1984), Czech former politician
- Markéta Vondroušová (born 1999), Czech tennis player
- Markéta Štroblová (born 1988), Czech pornographic actress
