= Leoncio Prado Military Academy =

Peruvian military school

- Spanish: Colegio Militar Leoncio Prado
- Other name: CMLP
- Motto: Spanish: Disciplina, Moralidad, Trabajo
- Motto in English: Discipline, Morality, Work
- Type: Military high school and preparatory school; Public School (I.E.E.)
- Established: 27 August 1943; 82 years ago
- Founders: Manuel Prado Ugarteche; Elías La Rosa
- Accreditation: Ministry of Education; Ministry of Defense
- Affiliations: Peruvian Armed Forces
- Director General: CRL. EP. Edilmer Chávez Guevara
- Location: La Perla District on the border of Callao and the San Miguel District, Lima, Peru
- Language: Spanish
- Named in honour of: Leoncio Prado Gutiérrez
- Website: www.leoncioprado.com

The Leoncio Prado Military Academy (Spanish: Colegio Militar Leoncio Prado) is a Peruvian educational institution founded on 27 August 1943 by President of the Republic Manuel Prado Ugarteche and Secretary of Education Elías La Rosa.

The academy came to worldwide notice as the setting of the novel The Time of the Hero by the Peruvian writer and Nobel laureate Mario Vargas Llosa. A military-style high school with boarding facilities, it serves as both a military high school and the preparatory school for potential officers of the Peruvian Armed Forces, who make up most of its alumni.

== Creation ==
On 18 January 1944, through Law 9890, the Academy was named after Leoncio Prado Gutiérrez, one of the Peruvian heroes of the War of the Pacific (and the President's half-brother through their father Mariano Ignacio Prado's first marriage). On 15 July 1944, it was officially inaugurated and started to function. The first authorities of the Academy were Headmaster Army Colonel José del Carmen Marín Arista and Academic Director Dr. Manuel Velasco Alvarado.

In 1945, Colonel Juan Mendoza Rodríguez took over the direction of the school. Among the first teachers at the Academy were Gustavo Pons Muzzo, Alfredo Rebaza Acosta, Walter Peñalosa Ramella, Humberto Santillán Arista, Flavio Vega Villanueva, Ricardo Cazorla Sormani, and Luis Bedoya Reyes.

== Location and structure ==
The school is located in the La Perla District on the border of Callao and the San Miguel District, Lima on Costanera Avenue, number 1541.

The structure was originally based on the 'Guardia Chalaca Barracks', made of two pavilions without doors or windows. Later on, the school was furnished with other facilities like a dining room, bedrooms, an infirmary, laboratories, administrative offices, an auditorium, a swimming pool, a stadium, a library, a gym, and a coliseum enclosure.

== Academic reform ==
Between 1977 and 1981 it went through a period of reform aimed at transforming it from a military secondary school to a Professional Education Centre, based on the Academic Reform standards which were being implemented at the time. Most of the teachers of the previous era migrated away from the school and a new group of teachers joined the Academy.

In 1982, it was decided to keep it as a secondary school. Currently, its academic programme is based on the guidelines of Peru's Ministry of Education.
