= Elizabeth Katz =

Mexican actress and former model

Elizabeth Katz is a Mexican actress and former model. She was born in France.

After obtaining a small role in the telenovela La casa al final de la calle ("The house at the end of the street") on Televisa, she obtained the role of a French model in Amor de Nadie. In 1995, she took on the role of "Mariana" in the Mexican film Mujeres infieles ("Unfaithful women").

== Films ==
- La mujer de los dos (1996)
- Mujeres infieles (1995) as Mariana
- Camarena vive (1990)

== Telenovelas ==
- Morir dos veces (1996) as Lucy
- Amor de nadie (1990) as Ivette
- La casa al final de la calle (1988) as Eva (young)
