= Francisco José Lombardi =

Peruvian film director

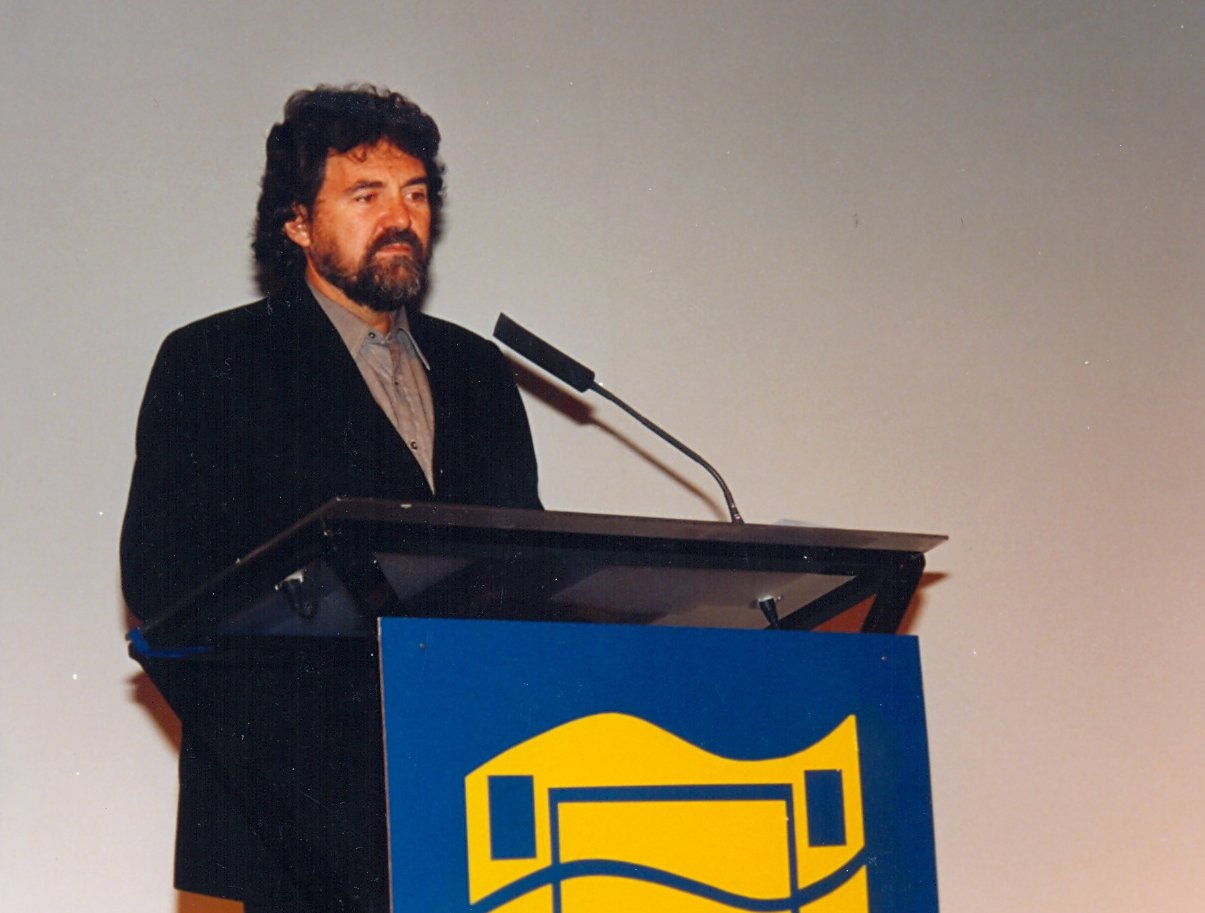
- Born: 3 August 1949 (age 76); Tacna, Peru
- Occupations: Film director Film producer Screenwriter
- Years active: 1977-present

Francisco José Lombardi (born 3 August 1949) is a Peruvian film director, producer and screenwriter. He has directed 17 films since 1977. He received the Silver Shell for Best Director in 1985 for his film The City and the Dogs based on the novel La ciudad y los perros by Mario Vargas Llosa. His film Without Compassion was screened in the Un Certain Regard section at the 1994 Cannes Film Festival.

== Filmography ==
- Maruja in Hell (1983)
- The City and the Dogs (1985)
- The Mouth of the Wolf (1988)
- Fallen from Heaven (1990)
- Without Compassion (1994)
- No se lo Digas a Nadie (Don't Tell Anyone) (1998)
- Captain Pantoja and the Special Services (2000)
- Tinta roja (2000)
- Ojos que no ven (What the Eye Doesn't See) (2003)
- Black Butterfly (2006)
- A Naked Body (2009)
- Ella (2010)
- Dos besos: Troika (2015)
- La decisión de Amelia (2022)
- Heart of the Wolf (2025)
