= Morir para vivir =

Mexican telenovela

- Genre: Telenovela; Romance; Drama
- Created by: Félix B. Caignet
- Written by: Fernanda Villeli; Edmundo Báez
- Directed by: Benjamín Cann
- Starring: Claudia Ramírez; Eduardo Capetillo; Susana Dosamantes; Raúl Román; Otto Sirgo; Carlos Bracho; Anna Silvetti
- Opening theme: Morir en paz by David Haro
- Ending theme: Morir para vivir by Erik Rubin
- Country of origin: Mexico
- Original language: Spanish
- No. of episodes: 75

Production
- Executive producer: Ana Martín
- Production locations: Morelos, Mexico; Mexico City, D.F., Mexico
- Cinematography: Luis Monroy
- Running time: 21-22 minutes (episodes 1-10); 41-44 minutes (episodes 11-75)
- Production company: Televisa

Original release
- Network: Canal de las Estrellas
- Release: September 11 – December 22, 1989

Related
- El renacer de Luna

Morir para vivir (English title: Die to live) is a Mexican telenovela produced by Ana Martín for Televisa in 1989.

Claudia Ramírez and Eduardo Capetillo starred as the protagonists, while Susana Dosamantes starred as the antagonist.

== Plot ==
Rosaura Guzmán is a woman whose evil knows no limits. Years ago, she sent to prison her own sister, Mercedes, accusing her of a crime she did not commit, so that she could stay with her husband, Andrés Guzmán, with whom Rosaura was in love. Alicia, the little daughter of Mercedes and Andrés, grew up thinking that Rosaura was her real mother, while she was serving her sentence in prison.

Fifteen years later, Rosaura's love for Andrés has ended and she is now the lover of the engineer Federico Iturralde, who was hired by Andrés himself to do drilling work on the hacienda where they live. Andrés begins to suspect that his wife is unfaithful to him with Iturralde, so Rosaura goes to ask for help from Bocó, the most famous sorcerer in the region. He gives her a poison that she pours little by little into Andrés's drinks until he causes a catatonic state very similar to death. Everyone, including Alicia, believes Andrés dead, who is buried alive

Rosaura prepares to celebrate her triumph without suspecting that Alicia and Federico have fallen in love, but when she finds out, she decides to eliminate her stepdaughter just as with her husband. Alicia is about to be buried alive when Teo, her dear old nurse, discovers a tear slipping down her cheek. The nurse asks for help from Dr. Sebastián Quijano (whom Andrés had asked to take care of Alicia in case he died), but then Bocó appears to try to prevent her from saving the young woman. During the struggle between the two men, Bocó loses his life when hitting his head, so the doctor decides to replace Alicia's body with the corpse of the witcher. The next day, the burial is carried out without Rosaura or anyone else knowing what happened. Meanwhile, the doctor takes Alicia to her home in Mexico City, where the young woman slowly recovers from what happened.

In front of Don Sebastián's house is a guest house owned by Milagros, a cheerful and kind woman who cares for her tenants as if they were part of her family. Alicia does not suspect that one of the guests is her real mother, Mercedes, who has been teaching piano since she was released from prison. Fate leads Alicia to become his student; over time, between the two women a great mutual love is born without any suspicion of the relationship that unites them

Víctor also lives in Milagros' house, a boy who has come from Guadalajara to the capital with the intention of becoming a great musician. Alicia's kindness makes Victor fall in love with her; However, Alicia does not want to know anything about love after what she experienced with Federico. Her heart is still filled with resentment and there is only one thing that drives her to continue living: the desire to take revenge on her father's murderer and the man who broke her heart. This time, it is Alicia who is not willing to stop at anything or anyone.

== Cast ==
- Claudia Ramírez as Alicia Guzmán/Andrea Quijano Guzmán
- Eduardo Capetillo as Víctor
- Susana Dosamantes as Rosaura Guzmán de Iturralde
- Raúl Román as Federico Iturralde
- Otto Sirgo as Sebastián Quijano
- Carlos Bracho as Andrés Guzmán
- Anna Silvetti as Mercedes Guzmán
- Silvia Mariscal as Elena
- Leonorilda Ochoa as Milagros
- Erik Rubin as Armando
- Rafael Rojas
- Rosita Pelayo as Rosi
- Carlos Espejel as Gus
- Eugenio Cobo as Pedro
- Óscar Morelli
- Miguel Gómez Checa as Genaro
- Jorge Abraham as Vicente
- Bruno Bichir as Julio
- Héctor del Puerto as Jorge
- Mario García González as Florentino
- Julia Marichal as Teo
- Adriana Olivera as Carolina
- Roxana Saucedo as Norma
- Jorge Zepeda as Bocó
- Claudia Fernández as Lorena
- Queta Carrasco as Aurora
- Rosa Carmina as Mireya
- Maleni Morales
- Álvaro Guerrero
- Mónica Miguel
- Lilia Aragón as Greta
- Lorena Velázquez as Etelvina
- Roberto Hernández as Chinto
- Verónica Langer as Martha
- José Ángel García as Roberto
- Beatriz Monroy as Eufemia
- Montserrat Ontiveros as Estrella
- Laura Zaizaras as Vicky
- Sara Campos as Luz
- Eduardo Castell as Dr. Herrera
- María Cristina Michaus as Gitana
- Francisco Javier Jiménez as Sacerdote
- Norma Rodríguez as Lupe
- Luis de Llano Macedo as Luis de la Pradera
- Sergio Ramos «El Comanche» as El Pérfido
- José Luis Rodrigo as Francisco

== Awards ==
Year	Award	Category	Nominee	Result
1990	TVyNovelas Awards	Best Antagonist Actress	Susana Dosamantes	Won
