= Elvira Travesí =

Argentinian actor (1919–2009)

- Born: December 11, 1919; Buenos Aires, Argentina
- Died: July 15, 2009 (aged 89); Madrid, Spain

Elvira Travesí (December 11, 1919 – July 15, 2009) was an Argentinean actress.

== Biography ==
Travesí was born in Argentina in December 1919 and moved to Peru with her family as a young child. When she was young, she worked as an actress with her two sisters Angelita and Gloria. , She married Juan Ureta and had two daughters, Gloria Maria and Liz, and lived in the central of Lima, Peru, afterwards living in Las Magolias (a building) in the residential area of San Felipe in Jesus Maria.

Considered the "first lady of the national scene", Travesí played an integral part in the rise of Peru's film industry in the 1930s. A member of the "Amauta Films" studio she acted in several costumbrist films produced during the era. Her more popular films include: "De carne somos" in 1938, "Los Confilictos de Cordero", and "Barco Sin Rumbo" in 1940.

She had a theater production company with the name of Atico 77.

In the middle of the 1980s, due to the oppressive economic situation in Peru, she moved to Madrid, Spain, where she stayed with her children.

She returned to Peru in 2003 to receive a tribute at the 6th festival of film of Lima. In addition, the Municipality of Peru paid homage to Travesí for her impeccable career.

Travesí suffered from a cerebral seizure in March 2009. She died in Madrid, Spain on July 15, 2009.

== Theater ==
- a Celestina (1967)
- Las troyanas
- La opinión de Amy (1999) ... Evelyn Thomas
- Mariposa, mariposa (1977)

== Television ==
- Historia de tres hermanas (1960)
- Las madres nunca mueren (1961)
- Acusada (1962)
- Mañana comienza el amor (1962)
- Caras sucias (1963).
- La cobarde (1963).
- Difamada (1963).
- Ansiedad (1963).
- El secreto de Sor Teresa (1964)
- Amor sin fronteras (1965)
- Dos amores (1965)
- La loba (1966)
- Simplemente María (1969)
- El maestro (1969)
- La boda diabólica (1969)
- La codicia de los cuervos (1969)
- Fugitivos de amor (1970)
- Nino, las cosas simples de la vida (1971)
- Se necesita una muchacha (1975)
- Una larga noche (1977)
- Nuestros héroes de la Guerra del Pacífico (1979)
- Tres mujeres, tres vidas (1984)
- Páginas de la vida (1984)

Series

- Teleteatro Estelar de los Domingos (1959)
- Tres Mujeres, Tres Vidas (1979)
- La Comedia Dramática Española (1986) (1 episodio)
  - Los árboles mueren de pie
- Lleno por favor (1994) (1 episodio)
  - "¡Y que cumplas muchos más!"
- 7 vidas (1999) (1 episodio)
- Policías, en el corazón de la calle (2001) (1 episodio)
  - "Tan cerca de tus brazos maniatados"
- El comisario (2004) (1 episodio)
  - "Pico cerrado"
- Hospital Central (2004) (1 episodio)
  - "Hijos difíciles"

== Film ==
- De carne somos (1938)
- Gallo de mi galpón (1938)
- El miedo a la vida (1938)
- Corazón de criollo (1938)
- Tierra linda (1939)
- Barco sin rumbo (1940)
- Los conflictos de Cordero (1940)
- Annabelle Lee (1968)
- Boda diabólica (1969)
- Estación de amor (1974)
- Melgar, el poeta insurgente (1981)
- Maruja en el infierno (1983)
- El aire que respiro (2005) (corto)
