= Simplemente María (1969 TV series) =

Peruvian 1969 television series

- Genre: Telenovela
- Created by: caridad Bravo Adams
- Written by: Gloria Travesí; Queca Herrero; Enrique Victoria
- Story by: Celia Alcantara
- Directed by: Carlos Barrios Porras; Carlos Gassols
- Starring: Saby Kamalich; Ricardo Blume
- Opening theme: "Simplemente María, María "
- Country of origin: Peru
- Original language: Spanish
- No. of episodes: 300

Production
- Executive producer: Alberto Terry
- Producer: Vlado Radovich
- Cinematography: Ricardo Figueroa
- Editor: cesar Ceferino Pita
- Production company: Empresa Editora Panamericana

Original release
- Network: Panamericana Television
- Release: May 15, 1969 – August 20, 1970

Related
- Simplemente María (1972); Simplemente María (1989); Simplemente María (2015)

Simplemente María (Simply María) is a Peruvian telenovela. It ran from 1969 to 1970. It starred Saby Kamalich as a woman who goes from a struggling single mother trying to improve herself to being a married fashion designer. The show is cited as increasing interest in sewing and adult literacy. Saby Kamalich would be presented with a gold sewing machine by the Singer Corporation as the show increased their sales in Peru.

Other characters included Esteban (Braulio Castillo), who began as her teacher and ended the series as her husband after a long relationship, while Ricardo Blume played both the man who seduced her and the son the relationship produced. The show was seen as an encouragement for upward mobility. It also dealt with issues of class and ethnicity. It has been said that it was "maybe the most popular television program of all time in Peru," and it also had fans in the rest of Latin America.

The fictional wedding that took place at a small church in Lima in a 1969 episode became one of the most important and controversial events that year, with over 12,000 fans being present at the church and its surroundings.

== Full Cast ==
- Saby Kamalich ... María Ramos
- Braulio Castillo ...Esteban
- Ricarado Blume .... Roberto Caride -Anthony Ramos
- Elvira Travesí ... Pierina
- Mariella Trejos ... Teresa
- Regina Alcóver .... Ita
- Fernando Larrañaga...Pierre
- Carola Duval ... Ines Caride
- Inés Sánchez Aizcorbe... Angélica
- Hernan Romero ... Carlos
- Gloria María Ureta...
- Lorena Duval... Alejandra
- Liz Ureta
- Benjamin Arce
- María Isabel Chiri
- Anita Martinez
- Eduarado Cesti
- Aldo Zignago
- Lucia Irurita
- Álvaro Gonzáles
- Ricardo Tosso
- Delfina paredes
- Hudson Valdivia
- Luis Alvarez
- Orlando Sacha
- Lola Vilar
- Mari carmen Gordon
- Juan Bautista Font
- Pepe Cipolla
- Pablo Fernández
- Martha Figueroa
- Pepe Vilar
- María Cristina Ribal
- Alfredo Bouroncle
- Alberto Soler
- German Vegas Garay
- Carlos Gassols
- Alfonzo Kafitti
- Augusto Varillas
- Gladys Rodriguez
- Luis La Roca
