= José Watanabe =

Peruvian poet (1946 – 2007)

José Watanabe

José Watanabe (1946 – 2007) was a Peruvian poet who won a number of literary awards.

Watanabe was born in Laredo, a large sugar cane farm in northern Peru. His father Harumi Watanabe was a Japanese immigrant, and his mother Paula Varas was a Peruvian of Andean origin. In a very intimate way, Watanabe fused his two deep cultural backgrounds in brief but intense poetic work.

In 1970, Watanabe shared, with Antonio Cillóniz, first prize in the "Young Poet" contest organized by "Cuadernos trimestrales de Poesía". This award has also been bestowed upon poets such as Javier Heraud and César Calvo. He won the award Young Poet of Peru in 1971 with his first book, Album de Familia.

After a silence of almost two decades, he resumed publishing in 1989 with El huso de la palabra. After that came Historia Natural (1994), Cosas del Cuerpo (1999) and Habitó entre Nosotros (2002). In 2000, he published in Colombia an anthology entitled El Guardián del Hielo and in 2004 he published in Spain Elogio del Refrenamiento, a comprehensive anthology that won numerous accolades.

"He is one of the few living Peruvian authors that can be qualified as essential" wrote Esperanza López Parada in Babelia, the literary supplement of El País.

Watanabe was also involved in the film industry as a screenwriter, production designer and art director. He died in April 2007. Several biographies, translations, and literary studies of Watanabe have been published since he died, and an exhibit about him, The Eye and its Reasons, was shown at the House of Peruvian Literature in 2019.

== Books published ==
- El huso de la palabra (Lima, 1989).
- Cosas del cuerpo (Lima, 1999).
- Habitó entre nosotros (Lima, 2002).
- Lo que queda bien abierto (Monte Ávila, Caracas, 2005, anthology)
- Banderas detrás de la niebla (Pre-Textos, Valencia, 2006-Peisa, Lima, 2006)
