= Red Ink (2000 film) =

- Directed by: Francisco Lombardi
- Screenplay by: Giovanna Pollarolo
- Based on: Tinta roja by Alberto Fuguet
- Starring: Giovanni Ciccia; Gianfranco Brero; Fele Martínez; Lucía Jiménez
- Cinematography: Teo Delgado
- Edited by: Danielle Fillios
- Music by: Bingen Mendizábal
- Production companies: América Producciones; Tornasol Films; Producciones Inca Films
- Distributed by: Alta Films
- Release dates: September 22, 2000 (Zinemaldia); November 1, 2000 (Peru)
- Running time: 121 minutes
- Countries: Peru; Spain
- Language: Spanish

Red Ink (Spanish: Tinta roja) is a 2000 drama film directed by Francisco Lombardi from a screenplay written by Giovanna Pollarolo, based on the novel by Alberto Fuguet.

== Plot summary ==
Two university students, Alfonso Fernandez Ferrer and his girlfriend Nadia, report to the editor of a tabloid newspaper to begin their stints as trainees. Nadia is given first choice and chooses the entertainment section as her assignment. Alfonso indicates that he too wanted the entertainment section but is advised that, since the newspaper's policy is to assign only one trainee to each section and Nadia has already chosen entertainment, Alfonso must work in a different section. To Alfonso's consternation, he is assigned to serve as a trainee to Don Saul, the editor of the police crime section.
