= El adorable profesor Aldao =

Peruvian 1970 television series

- Genre: Telenovela
- Created by: Alberto Migre
- Written by: Enrique Victoria
- Directed by: Martin Clutet
- Starring: Regina Alcóver; Julio Aleman; Hernan Romero; Patricia Aspillaga
- Opening theme: El adorable profesor Aldao (Song) performed by Raúl Vásquez
- Composer: Raúl Vásquez
- Country of origin: Peru
- Original language: Spanish
- No. of episodes: 100

Production
- Executive producer: Alberto Terry
- Producer: Vlado Radovich
- Production location: Lima
- Cinematography: Ricardo Figueroa
- Editor: Cesar Ceferino Pita
- Running time: 50 minutes

Original release
- Network: Panamericana Televisión
- Release: 1970 – 1970

Related
- Carmín; Besos Robados

El adorable profesor Aldao is a Peruvian Telenovela produced by Vlado Radovich for Panamericana Televisión in 1970

== Cast ==
- Regina Alcóver ...Viviana Hortiguera
- Julio Alemán ...Mariano Aldao
- Patricia Aspíllaga ....Constanza
- Hernan Romero
- Elvira Tizon ...Delmira
- Nora Guzmán ... Madre superiora
- Esmeralda checa ... Peralta
- Yola Polastri
- Liz Ureta
- Gabriela Linares
- Francisco Solari
- Irene de Zela
- Miriran Gonzáles
- Carmen Stain
- Maria del Carmen Ureta
