= Saby Kamalich =

Peruvian-Mexican actress (1939–2017)

- Born: Sabina Fantoni Kamalich; 13 May 1939; Lima, Peru
- Died: 13 September 2017 (aged 78); Mexico City, Mexico
- Occupation: Actress
- Years active: 1959—2017
- Spouse: Carlos Tuccio
- Children: 4
- Parent(s): Antonio Fantoni; Maria Kamalich

Saby Kamalich, born Sabina Fantoni Kamalich, (13 May 1939 in Lima, Peru – 13 September 2017 in Mexico City, Mexico) was a Peruvian-Mexican actress, known for her work in television and film. She became famous for playing the title character in the Peruvian telenovela Simplemente María in 1969. Aside from her telenovela roles, Kamalich starred in several Mexican film productions, including Valente Quintero (1973), with Antonio Aguilar, Narciso Busquets, and Sara García.

== Biography ==
Kamalich was born to Modesto Fantoni, and Maria Romina Kamalich. She first became interested in acting as a young woman when Braulio Castillo, the Puerto Rican actor, went to work in Peru. Kamalich admitted to El Vocero, a newspaper in Puerto Rico, that she had platonic feelings for Castillo. The two would later maintain a lifelong friendship.

Looking for better job opportunities, Kamalich moved to Mexico in 1970, where she had participated in three stage productions, and more importantly in Panamericana's 1969 version of the well-known telenovela (Spanish soap opera), Simplemente Maria. The Peruvian version, was the fourth filmed of Simplemente Maria, which had already been a hit in Argentina, Brazil and Venezuela.

Simplemente Maria made Kamalich famous across Latin America, in markets such as Guatemala, Nicaragua, Uruguay, the Dominican Republic, and the aforementioned countries, Venezuela, Puerto Rico and Mexico. After, she appeared in a considerable number of telenovelas, usually playing benevolent characters. One exception was her 2005 participation in Gitanas, where she plays a villain. In Gitanas, she had the opportunity to act with Saul Lisazo, who played her son, among other actors.

In 2005 she also acted in another Telemundo serial, Corazón partido where she reappeared as villain yet again in the role of "Virginia Graham". In 2007 Kamalich participates in another telenovela produced by Telemundo. Madre Luna which was shot in Colombia, she played the role as a villain. This was the first time in many years that Kamalich left Mexico (where she has resided for over 3 decades) to a foreign country (Colombia) to participate in this telenovela (Madre Luna). Among the most significant telenovelas are: 1971's Rosas Para Veronica, which was another major hit, Mi Rival (1973) and Amor Prohibido (1979), which was also later remade.

After the decade of the 1970s was over, Kamalich's telenovela career slowed somewhat. During the 1980s, she participated in ten productions, including 1988's Amor en Silencio ("Silently Loving You"). During the 1990s, her work became even more sporadic, but she did participate in Carrusel de las Américas, which was the sequel of the children's telenovela hit Carrusel, alongside Ludwika Paleta. In 1998, she and Lucía Méndez acted together in Tres veces Sofia (Three Times Sofia).

Kamalich was scheduled to be awarded the Eduardo Arozamena Medal for her contributions to acting. She won the prestigious Ariel award for best acting performances in Mexico for best supporting actress in Mariana. Apart from that, she made a film, Simplemente Maria, based on the successful telenovela. In 2012, she was to Berenice del Toro in La Mujer de Judas (2012) but did not show up on the first day of shooting due to health problems. She was replaced by Marta Verduzco. Later that year, she was set to come back with La Otra Cara del Alma.

== Death ==
Saby Kamalich died on 13 September 2017 at the age of 78.

== See also ==
- List of entertainers in Mexico
