= Rolf (disambiguation) =

Rolf is a male given name and a surname.

Rolf may also refer to:

- Rolf (Airedale Terrier) (died 1919), a dog claimed to perform arithmetic and communicate intellectually
- Rolf (company), a Russian car dealer
- Tropical Storm Rolf, a Mediterranean tropical cyclone that made landfall in France in 2011

== See also ==
- Rolph, a surname
- Rolfe (disambiguation)
- Rolfing, a type of massage
- ROFL, an acronym for "Rolling On the Floor Laughing"
