= The boy Jones =

Teenage intruder into Buckingham Palace (1824 – c. 1893 or 1896)

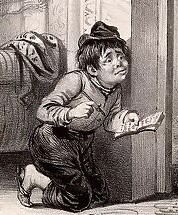
Depiction of Jones, 1840s

Edward Jones (7 April 1824 – c. 1893 or 1896), also known as "the boy Jones", was an English stalker who became notorious for breaking into Buckingham Palace several times between 1838 and 1841.

Jones was fourteen years old when he first broke into the palace in December 1838. He was found in possession of some items he had stolen, but was acquitted at his trial. He broke in again in 1840, ten days after Queen Victoria had given birth to Princess Victoria. Staff found him hiding under a sofa and he was arrested and subsequently questioned by the Privy Council—the monarch's formal body of advisers. He was sentenced to three months' hard labour at Tothill Fields Bridewell prison. He was released in March 1841 and broke back into the palace two weeks later, where he was caught stealing food from the larders. He was again arrested and sentenced to three months' hard labour at Tothill Fields.

To remove Jones from Britain, the Thames Police tried to surreptitiously coerce him into employment as a sailor. After a voyage on a merchant ship to Brazil, Jones returned to London, where he worked for a month before disappearing and signing up to the Royal Navy—again at the instigation of the Thames Police. He was a ship's boy on HMS Warspite and had further duty on Inconstant and Harlequin. He deserted twice before being allowed to leave the service in 1847. After his return to Britain, Jones was arrested in 1849 for burgling houses in Lewisham, Kent (now South London), and sentenced to transportation to Australia for ten years. He returned to Britain in late 1855 or early 1856 and was again arrested for burglary, before he returned—of his own accord—to Australia. The details of his death are not known, although it was possibly in Bairnsdale in the east of Australia on Boxing Day 1893 or in Perth, in the west of Australia in 1896.

Jones's exploits were extensively covered in the press, and several songs, ballads, poems and cartoons were created. He has been used as the basis for fictional characters and, because of the connection to Queen Victoria, is mentioned in several history books.

== Biography ==
=== Early life, 1824–1838 ===
Edward Jones was born on 7 April 1824 in Charlotte Street, Westminster, London, the eldest of seven children of Henry Jones, an impecunious tailor, and Mary (née Shores). (Note: The historian Paul Thomas Murphy considers the identity of Jones's mother as unconfirmed, although a Mary Jones residing with Henry and Edward in 1841 was likely either his mother or stepmother.) Mary was a 16-year-old seamstress in Henry's employ when the couple married in 1822. Edward had some basic education: he was literate and excelled at arithmetic, but left school before he was twelve. He professed an interest in becoming an architect. The Weekly Chronicle reported that as a child, Jones "manifested a very restless spirit, ... always inquisitive, active and thirsting for information". According to his father, however, Jones was lazy, pessimistic, melancholic and reserved; Henry also said his son did not mix with his siblings and treated them with open contempt.

Jones was apprenticed to two pharmacists between 1836 and 1838. He was dismissed from one of the positions for demonstrating a "mischievous and restless disposition". He was also apprenticed to a Thomas Griffiths, a builder with premises on Coventry Street, where he lasted for a year before being dismissed. In August 1838 he became an apprentice to a carver and gilder, but left on 11 December.

=== Break-ins, 1838–1841 ===
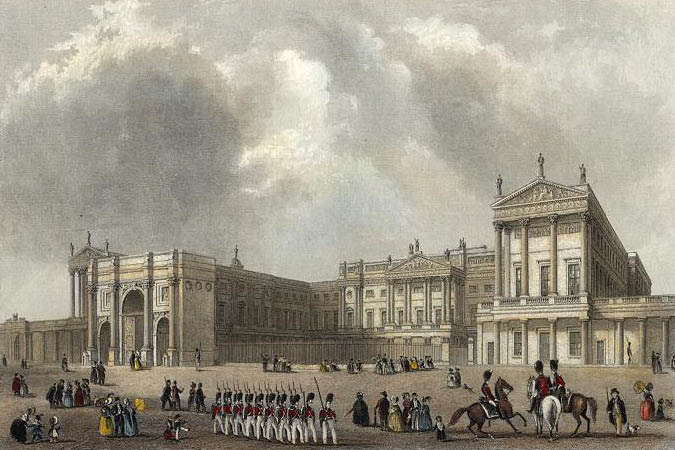
Buckingham Palace in 1837, with Marble Arch as the front gate

==== December 1838 ====
At 5:00 am on 14 December 1838 Jones was found in Buckingham Palace—the main residence of the monarch—by William Cox, one of the night porters. Among the items in Jones's possession were a regimental sword, some underwear, three pairs of trousers, some foreign coins and a likeness of Queen Victoria. She was not in residence at the time, but was staying at her country palace, Windsor Castle. He was covered in bear's grease and soot, which led palace staff to think he had climbed down the chimney and tried to make his way out the same way. When he was taken to the police station, he claimed his name was Edward Cotton, the son of a tradesman. When asked where he came from, he said "I came from Hertfordshire twelve months ago, and I met a man ... who asked me to go with him to Buckingham-house. I went, and have been there ever since." (Note: Murphy notes that despite his name and story being uncovered quickly at the time, more recent biographies and histories continued to refer to Jones as "Edward Cotton". These included Cecil Woodham-Smith, Queen Victoria: Her Life and Times, 1: 1819–1861 (1972), Stanley Weintraub, Victoria: Biography of a Queen (1987) and Robert Rhodes James, Prince Albert (1984).)

Jones appeared in front of the magistrates at the police station in Queen Street on 19 December. News of a boy living secretly in Buckingham Palace had become known among the public, and the court was full of viewers and journalists. His real name and background were told to the court, and he admitted that he had lied about having lived in the house for the previous year, and had only spent "a day or two" in the palace. He was asked about the various items he had on him and said he found them on the lawn; the magistrate disbelieved his story and sent him for trial. On 28 December 1838 Jones appeared for trial at the Westminster court of sessions. William Prendergast, Jones's solicitor, described how his client had a "warmth of spirit which ... had manifested itself in an inordinate curiosity to obtain a view of Buckingham Palace; and a very natural inclination it was". Griffiths gave a character reference for Jones and said that he would have him back as an apprentice; after Prendergast told the court that Jones had promised he would not break into the palace again, he was acquitted.

Jones was re-apprenticed to Griffiths after the trial. Several members of the public travelled to meet Jones, paying his father for the experience. The American novelist James Fenimore Cooper was one who visited, but found Jones to be a "dull, undersized runt, remarkable only for his taciturnity and obstinacy". An offer to take the boy to the US was turned down by Jones's father. Another offer Jones received was from a theatre manager, who was planning to stage Intrusion; or a Guest Uninvited, a comedy based on Jones's exploits. Jones was to receive a salary of £4 a week for coming on stage at the end of the night to take a bow. Jones's father, concerned his son would be a laughing stock, declined the offer. (Note: £4 in 1838 equates to approximately £383 in 2025, according to calculations based on the Consumer Price Index measure of inflation.) Jones was sacked for a second time by Griffiths and, in 1840, began working for another chemist, but his unpunctuality led to his again losing his position.

==== November and December 1840 ====
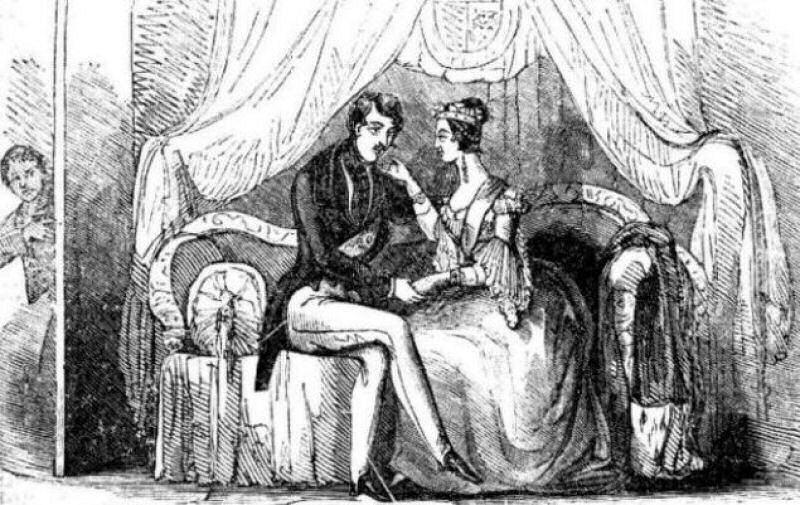
Jones spying on Prince Albert and Queen Victoria; from the Sunday Chronicle, April 1841

On 30 November 1840 Jones scaled a wall on Constitution Hill to access the grounds of Buckingham Palace. He entered the building through a window, but there were too many people moving around and he left the way he had come. He entered again on the following night. Victoria was in residence with her daughter, Princess Victoria, who had been born ten days previously. Just after midnight the domestic staff at the palace found Jones hiding under a sofa in an anteroom near the Queen's bedroom. Neither the Queen nor her baby was woken by the event. In her diary the following morning, Victoria recorded the following:

Albert told me ... that a man had been found, under the sofa in my sitting room. ... The audience room, and [Baroness Louise] Lehzen's were searched first and then mine, Kinnaird, looking under one corner of the sofa, on which I had been rolled into the bedroom but said nothing. Lehzen however pushed it away, and there on the ground, lay a lad who was seized and would not speak, but he was quite unarmed. After he had been taken downstairs, he said he had meant no harm, and had only come to see the Queen! We have since heard that he was in the palace once before, was half-witted, and had merely come, out of curiosity. But supposing he had come into the bedroom – how frightened I should have been.

Police based at the palace arrested Jones and took him into custody at the Gardner's Lane police station; he told officers that he "sat upon the throne, saw the Queen, and heard the Princess Royal cry". When he was arrested he did not struggle, nor had he stolen anything; he was unarmed and polite to his captors. At midday on 3 December he was taken from the police station to offices of the Home Department in Whitehall where he was interrogated by the Privy Council—the monarch's formal body of advisers. (Note: The Privy Councillors in attendance were the Marquess of Normanby, the Home Secretary; the Earl of Uxbridge, Lord Chamberlain; the Earl of Errol, Lord Steward; and the Earl of Clarendon, Lord Privy Seal. Also present were Charles Murray, the Master of the Household; Fox Maule, the Under-Secretary of State for the Home Department; Thomas Hall, the Chief Metropolitan Police Magistrate; and Colonel Charles Rowan, the Commissioner of the Metropolitan Police.)

During his questioning Jones said he would show the members where and how he entered, and he was taken to the palace, explained his route and method, and returned to the council to continue being questioned. He told the council that his reason for entering the palace was because he wanted to write a book about the Queen and "wanted to know how they lived at the Palace" and that he thought "an account of the Palace, and of the disposition and arrangement of the chambers, and particularly of the dressing room of Her Majesty, would be very interesting".

Jones's father was summoned to the council; he suggested his son was insane. Two police doctors examined Jones and concluded that although "his head was of a most peculiar formation", they could not decide on his sanity. As he had been unarmed and not stolen anything, the council decided that a summary punishment was the best course of action; Thomas Hall, the Chief Metropolitan Police Magistrate wrote a warrant to send Jones to Tothill Fields Bridewell prison for three months' hard labour.

==== March 1841 ====
Jones was released from Tothill on 2 March 1841. Hall suggested that he should become a sailor, but Jones and his parents refused. He tried to find a job, but his notoriety preceded him and he was unable to find employment. Less than two weeks later, on the evening of 15 March, he entered Buckingham Palace again. At 1:30 am on 16 March he was found by a police patrol near the palace's Picture Gallery, eating food stolen from the kitchens. (Note: After Jones's previous break-in, fourteen constables and two police sergeants had been given night guard duty at the palace; it was one of these patrols that saw and recognised Jones.) He was again arrested and, later that day, questioned by the Privy Council, with Hall attending in his magistrate's capacity. No-one else was allowed into the hearing—including Jones's parents—and the only witness called was the police sergeant who had made the arrest. Unlike the previous hearing, there were no leaks of the events to the journalists waiting outside, and the only statement given was that Jones had been sent back to Tothill for a further three months' detention with hard labour. Jones's father, unhappy at the treatment of his son, complained to journalists about an "un-English secret court".

=== Later life, 1841–1893 ===
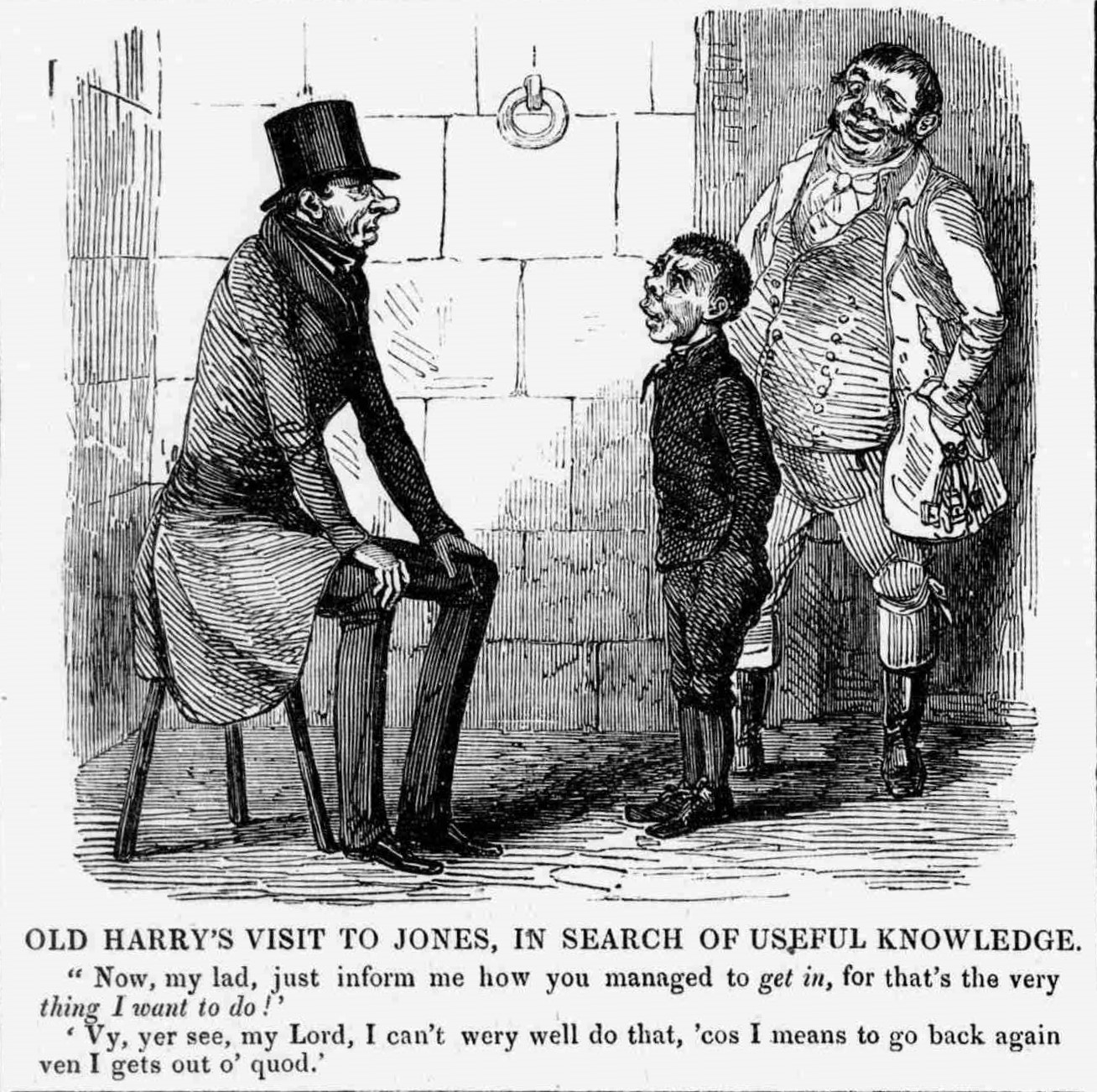
Cartoon of the boy Jones in The Odd Fellow, April 1841

Jones was released from Tothill on 14 June 1841. His movements were monitored by police, and he was reported as being in the vicinity of Constitution Hill and Buckingham Palace on several occasions. Jones and his family were soon visited by William James, their landlord, who brought with him James Evans, who said he was an agent able to get Jones a job on a ship. Evans was, however, an Inspector of the Thames Police, who had orders to get Jones employed on a ship to remove him from Britain.

Jones was persuaded to go to Gravesend, Kent, an entry port for the Thames. Evans told him the ship Diamond was waiting for him and he would be able to secure a job; Evans promised him five guineas to help get the necessary clothing and as an incentive. (Note: A guinea was a gold coin whose value was officially fixed at twenty-one shillings. Five guineas in 1841 equates to approximately £471 in 2025, according to calculations based on the Consumer Price Index measure of inflation.) When they got to Gravesend, the captain of Diamond recognised Jones as the palace intruder and refused to have him on board. The ship left for Cork, Ireland, where it was due to take on passengers before its planned journey to Australia.

Evans, James and Jones returned to London, where Evans was instructed by his superiors to get to Cork and ensure Jones was put on Diamond. The three men travelled to Cork, but the captain again refused to allow Jones on board his ship. Evans, concerned that he would be in trouble with his superiors, persuaded Tom Clancy—one of the Irish emigrants wanting to travel to Australia—to take the berth and pretend he was Jones to the other passengers. This he did, and when Clancy arrived in Melbourne, it was mentioned in the local press. His subterfuge only lasted three weeks after arrival, and newspapers in Australia reported the mistaken identity of the new immigrant to the country.

Looking for another ship to take Jones, the three men travelled to Liverpool, where they met Captain Ramsay, whose ship Tiber was due to sail for Bahia, Brazil. Ramsay took Jones onto his crew and they sailed to Brazil and back, returning to Liverpool on 30 November 1841. Jones left Liverpool with 2 shillings 6 pence, (Note: 2s 6d in 1841 equates to approximately £12 in 2025, according to calculations based on the Consumer Price Index measure of inflation.) and walked back to London, a distance of 210 miles (340 km). He slept in barns and outhouses and after he ran out of money, he ate raw turnips. He arrived back in London on 18 December.

In early January 1842 Jones began work for Mr Elgar, a tobacconist, in a role organised for him by his father. After a few weeks he told his employer that there were suspicious men watching him. One of them, who was dressed like a Royal Navy midshipman, had been into the shop and, Jones said, sat grinning at him. On the way into work on 4 February he saw the man he thought of as the midshipman, and asked Elgar if he could go home. He went home, put on a clean shirt and went out again between 10:00 and 11:00 am and did not return home. His father reported the disappearance to the police, who searched Buckingham Palace, but found no evidence that Jones had been there.

==== Royal Navy, 1842–1848 ====
Depictions of the boy Jones in the humorous magazine Punch

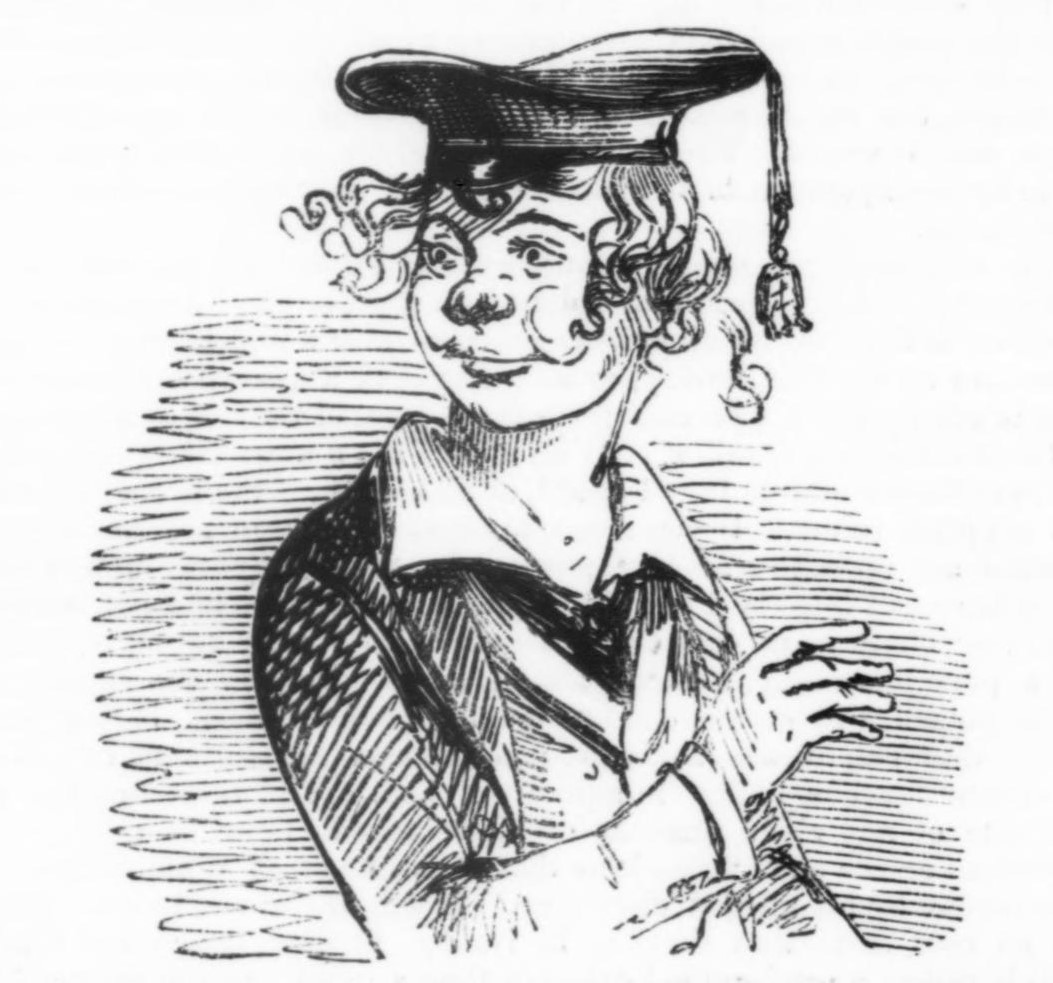
Jones, depicted as a sailor; July 1844 issue

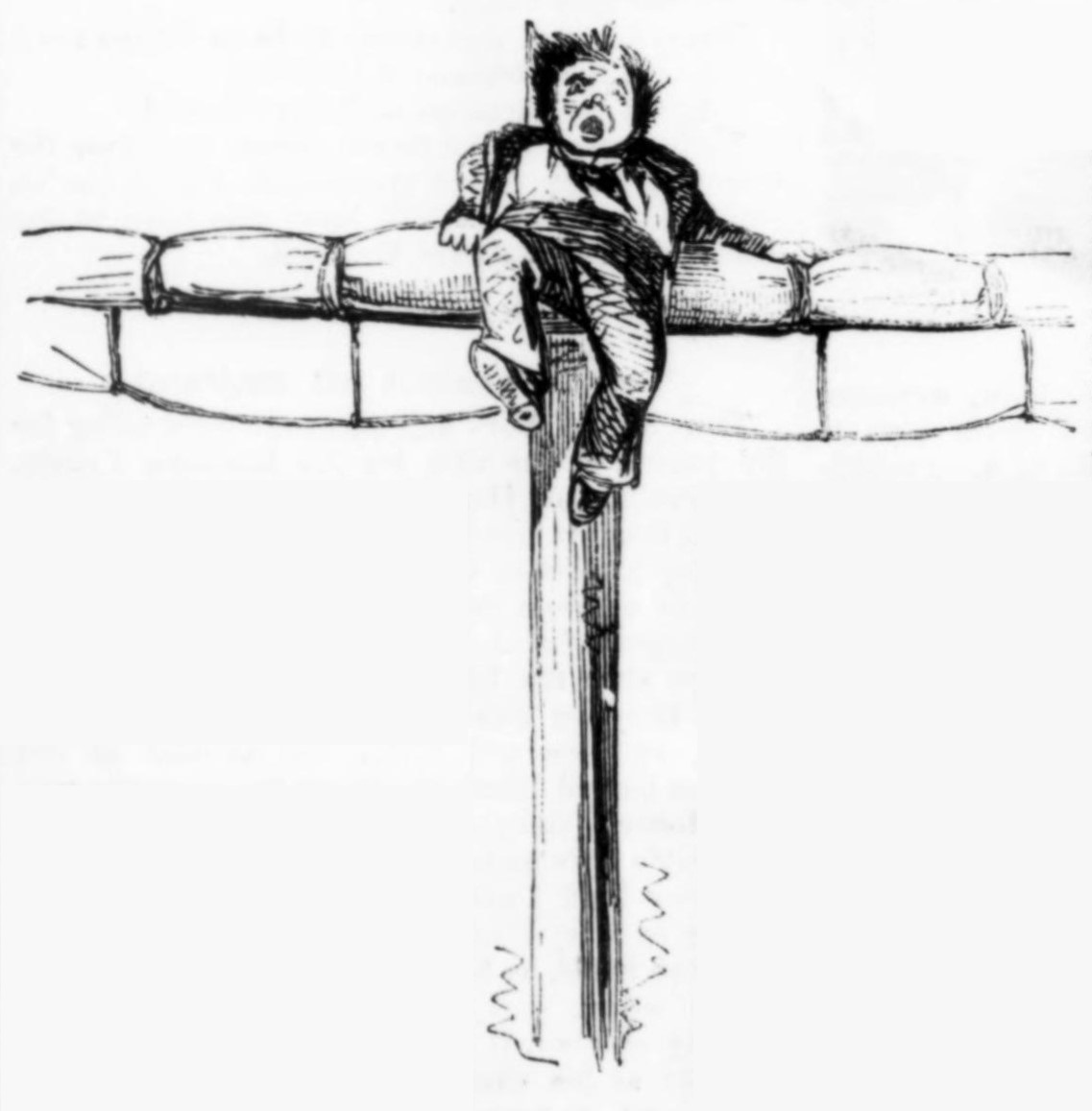
Jones while mast manning; August 1844 issue

Within two days of his disappearance, Jones's father had received a letter from "a Captain, and Well-wisher to your son" that said "I am requested by your son Edward to inform you he has sailed on board the ____, for America, on Friday last". (Note: The name of the ship had been replaced with a line in the letter.) Soon after, Elgar received a letter from Jones informing him that James—the family's landlord—had taken him to Portsmouth dockyard, where he had been introduced to Captain Lord John Hay of HMS Warspite, a 74-gun third-rate ship of the line. Jones informed Elgar that he was now in the Royal Navy for the next four years and would shortly be sailing to America. The Times considered that "suspicion strongly points to the same parties who rendered themselves so notoriously conspicuous in his former abduction; and though the father of the boy is in such reduced circumstances as to be unable to take legal measures, it is probable means may be found to fathom this mysterious matter", an assessment with which Jan Bondeson, Jones's biographer, agrees.

Jones served on Warspite as a second-class ship's boy, possibly Hay's servant, and then, from May 1842, as first-class ship's boy. He was then also made a mast man on the mizzen-topmast. Warspite returned to Portsmouth that October and Jones was allowed shore leave, although he was accompanied by a midshipman to ensure he did not try to abscond. He evaded his watcher, swapped his uniform jacket for a black coat, and walked back to London. Hay alerted the Admiralty, who informed the police; they increased security at the palace and put some of Jones's known haunts under surveillance. He was soon arrested at his parents' house and returned to Portsmouth. When police asked him why he had deserted, Jones informed them that he was tired of being mocked by his shipmates about breaking into the palace.

Bondeson notes that little is known about Jones's life in the Royal Navy. It is recorded that in early 1844 he fell overboard while Warspite was off the North African coast, but was soon rescued. In December that year, he jumped overboard at Athens and swam to shore. He was pursued and captured by a search party and his rum ration was stopped for the remainder of his time on Warspite.

In December 1845 Jones was promoted to ordinary seaman and transferred to HMS Inconstant, a 36-gun fifth-rate ship of the line. He served on board for a year and when the ship returned to Britain, Jones was transferred to HMS Harlequin, a Racer-class brig-sloop that was to continue on patrol duty in the Mediterranean. In October 1847 Jones's father petitioned the Admiralty to allow his son to return home. This was granted and Jones was discharged from the navy in Smyrna (modern İzmir, Turkey), and given free passage home. He arrived back in London in January 1848.

==== Britain, 1848–1853 ====
In August 1849 several burglaries and petty thefts occurred in Lewisham, Kent (now South London); a man wearing sailor's dress had been seen at the times the crimes were committed. On 24 August a man was arrested after a wealthy solicitor had been burgled in Lewisham Road; he was found to have the stolen goods in his possession. He gave his name as John Frost, and was tried at the Old Bailey under that name and sentenced to transportation to one of the Australian penal colonies for ten years. While waiting for departure at Newgate Prison, he was recognised as Jones. He was moved to the prison hulks, where he remained for over three years.

==== Australia, 1853–1893 or 1896 ====
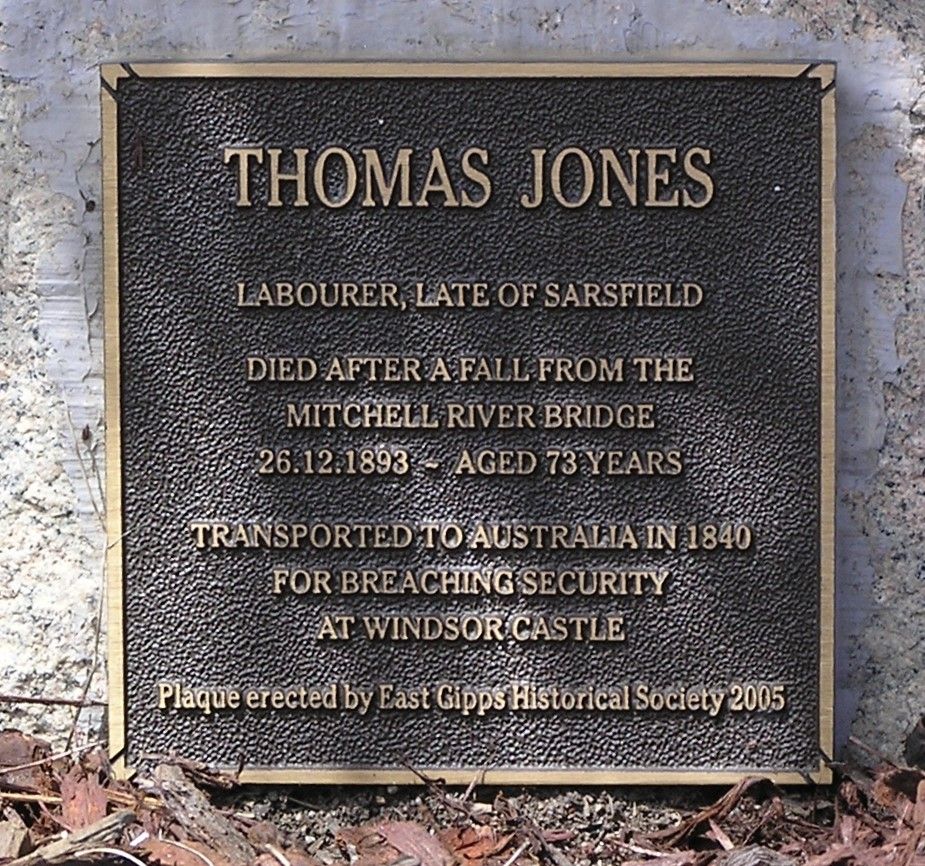
Jones's memorial plaque at the Bairnsdale Cemetery. The date that he was transported and the description that he breached Windsor Castle are both erroneous.

In January 1853 Jones was transported on the Pyrenees, a four-masted barque, to the penal colony in Fremantle, Western Australia, arriving on 30 April. Instead of being incarcerated, the day after he arrived he was given a ticket of leave—a document of parole which allowed him some freedoms. He was remembered in the memoirs of Edmund Du Cane, the soldier and prison administrator who organised convict labour in the region, who recalled:

The only case that ever occurred of trespass in my grounds ... was when once the celebrated "boy Jones" (whose lofty aspirations towards high life had not met with success) broke out of the depot about ten o'clock to complain that the lights had been put out too early!

Jones returned to England in late 1855 or early 1856. He broke into the Plymouth home of Major-General George Morton Eden on 10 May 1856, but was soon arrested by the Devonport police. He was tried, found guilty and sentenced to six months of hard labour.

According to Bondeson, there is limited information about Jones after his release from hard labour, but it is probable that he returned to Australia, possibly at the suggestion of his brother, who was a civil servant in the colony. The contemporary journalist Henry Lucy reports that he received a letter from a reader who told him that Jones became the town crier in Perth, Western Australia. According to this possible version, Jones died in 1896. Lucy related that:

When he went forth, bell in hand, to perform his important functions, the naughty boys of Perth were accustomed to gather round him and make pointed inquiries as to the approaches to Buckingham Palace, the health of the Queen, and the appearance of the baby who is to-day Dowager Empress of Germany. The man Jones, angered beyond self-restraint, occasionally made dashes at the enemy, committing assaults which made his appearance in the police court familiar. (Note: The "Dowager Empress of Germany" refers to Queen Victoria's daughter, Victoria, Princess Royal.)

Bondeson considers it more likely that Jones—known locally as Thomas Jones—was living near Bairnsdale, Victoria. On Boxing Day 1893, while drunk, he fell asleep on the parapet of a bridge over the Mitchell River. He rolled off, hit his head and died. He was buried in an unmarked grave in the town's cemetery. A memorial plaque was erected by the East Gippsland Historical Society in 2005 in his memory.

== Coverage in the media ==
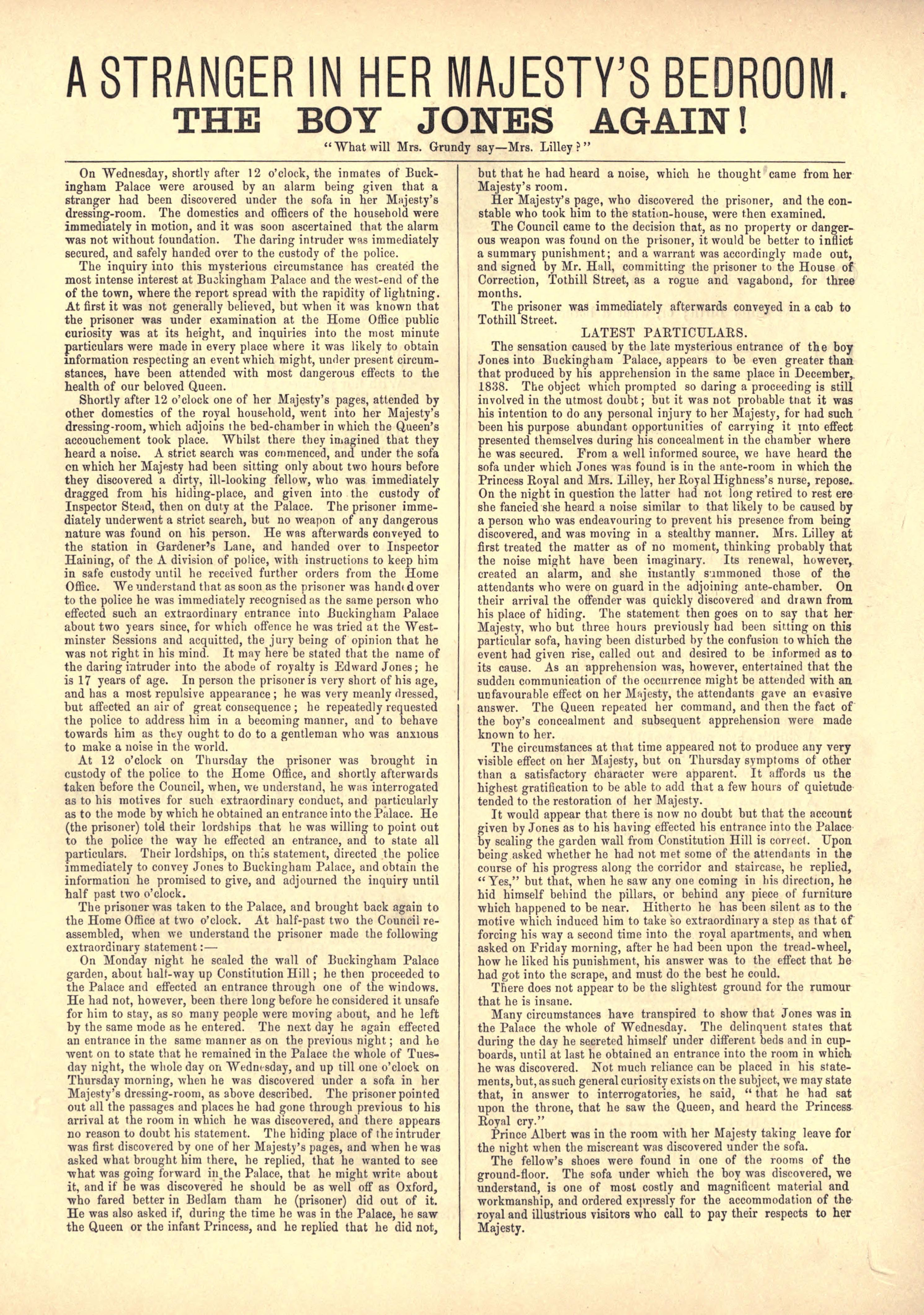
A cheap news sheet published in 1871 about Boy Jones's exploits

After Jones broke into the palace in December 1840, there was a high level of interest in him shown by the newspapers and satirical magazines, as well as gossip among the public; Bondeson considers that Jones became "the media celebrity of the day". The report of the events in The Times observed that "The subject engrosses public attention at the west end of town. Nothing else is talked of".

The poet Samuel Rogers had alluded to the Renaissance architect Inigo Jones when he nicknamed Jones "In-i-go Jones"; the novelist Charles Dickens recorded in his literary magazine All the Year Round that Jones gained the name because of his "extraordinary powers of finding an entrance into the palace". Charles Hindley, the biographer of the printer James Catnach, observed that Jones was the subject of satirical pieces in the press, as well as several cartoons printed for street sale. These included works such as "Her Majesty's Chimney Sweep", "The Royal Sooter", "The Buckingham Palace Hero" and "The Royal Flue Faker". Jones was included in fictional stories by the humorous magazine Punch, which also included cartoons of him. In 1842 George Cruikshank's The Comic Almanack published a poem about Jones after he put to sea with the Royal Navy:

For though his name is Jones, and though he did
Enter the Palace, and not touch the knocker,
There is no reason why Jones's kid
Should be consigned to Davy Jones's locker.

— "The boy Jones sent to sea"

== Legacy ==
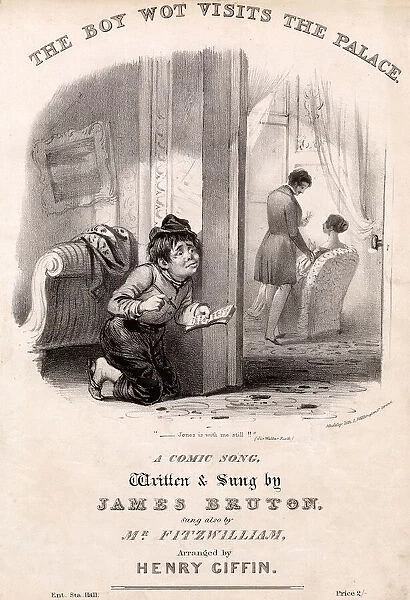
Sheet music for "The Boy Wot Visits the Palace"

Jones's notoriety and nickname became part of London slang in the mid-1800s. Initially it was used as "it's that boy Jones again!" when something unexpected happened; it changed over time to be "Boy Jones", as a nickname for an informant.

Factual coverage of Jones's life has appeared in several histories of Queen Victoria, a BBC Radio history documentary in October 1992 titled That Boy Jones, and Paul Murphy's entry for the Oxford Dictionary of National Biography in 2010. Later that year Bondeson's full history of Jones's life, Queen Victoria's Stalker, was published.

Jones's story has been covered in works of fiction. In the mid-1840s the writer George W. M. Reynolds published the series The Mysteries of London, which includes Henry Holford, a pot-boy; this character was a combination of Jones and Edward Oxford—the man who attempted to assassinate Victoria in 1840. Jones's story inspired the children's book The Boy Jones by Joan Howard, which was published in 1943, and a 1949 novel, The Mudlark, by Theodore Bonnet. The novel was adapted as a 1950 film of the same name in which the title character is portrayed by Andrew Ray. In 2002 a two-act play, written and directed by Sky Gilbert, was staged. Robert Forrest-Webb turned the story into a musical, Jones, in 2006; Peter Gritton wrote the music. Jones's break-ins were dramatised in the second season of the period drama Victoria (2017), where Jones is portrayed by Tommy Rodger, and in a 2021 animated short film.

Jones was the subject of two ballads from the 1840s: "The Boy Wot Visits the Palace" by James Bruton and "The Boy That was Found in the Palace" by Catnach. The second of these describes the moment he was discovered under the sofa:

You have heard of the chap that they found t'other day
In Buckingham Palace, I can tell you the truth –
'Twas in the next chamber to where the Queen lay,
They found me, this very identical youth.
At first, they all thought I had come there to plunder,
But I had no notion of stealing, not I –
Pages, nurses and officers, pulled me from under
The very identical couch where she lay.

— James Catnach, "The Boy That was Found in the Palace"

== See also ==
- Michael Fagan

== Notes and references ==
=== Sources ===
==== Books ====
- Ashton, John (1903). Gossip in the First Decade of Victoria's Reign. London: Hurst and Blackett. OCLC 1546552.
- Baird, Julia (2017). Victoria the Queen: An Intimate Biography of the Woman Who Ruled an Empire. New York: Random House. ISBN 978-0-8129-8228-2.
- Bondeson, Jan (2012). Queen Victoria's Stalker: The Strange Story of the Boy Jones. Stroud: Amberley. ISBN 978-1-4456-0697-2.
- Cathcart, Helen (1969). The Royal Bedside Book. London: W. H. Allen. ISBN 978-0-4910-0133-5.
- Cruikshank, George; Thackeray, William Makepeace; Smith, Albert; à Beckett, Gilbert Abbott; Mayhew, Horace; Mayhew, Henry (1878). The Comic Almanack; an Ephemeris in Jest and Earnest. London: Chatto and Windus. OCLC 1014105545.
- Du Cane, Edmund (January 1862). "The Convict System in the Colonies". Bentley's Miscellany 1862-01: Vol 51. Open Court Publishing Co. pp. 513–527. ISSN 1751-8466.
- Helbig, Alethea (1985). Dictionary of American Children's Fiction, 1859–1959: Books of Recognized Merit. Westport, CT: Greenwood Press. ISBN 978-0-3132-2590-1.
- Hindley, Charles (1878). The Life and Times of James Catnach (late of the Seven Dials), Ballad Monger. London: Reeves and Turner. OCLC 1114759603.
- Jones, Paul (2019). The Cabinet of Linguistic Curiosities: A Yearbook of Forgotten Words. Chicago, IL: University of Chicago Press. ISBN 978-0-2266-4684-8.
- Lucy, Henry (1920). The Diary of a Journalist. London: John Murray. OCLC 474306213.
- Moss, Alan; Skinner, Keith (2015). Scotland Yard's History of Crime in 100 Objects (Kindle ed.). Stroud, Glos: The History Press. ISBN 978-0-7509-6655-9.
- Plunkett, John (2004). "Regicide and Regimania: G. W. M. Reynolds and The Mysteries of London". In Maunder, Andrew; Moore, Grace (eds.). Victorian Crime, Madness and Sensation. Aldershot, Hants: Ashgate. pp. 15–30. ISBN 978-0-7546-4060-8.
- Poole, Steve (2018). The Politics of Regicide in England 1760-1850: Troublesome Subjects. Manchester: Manchester University Press. ISBN 978-1-5261-3061-7.
- Raikes, Thomas (1856). A Portion of the Journal Kept by Thomas Raikes, Esq. London: Longman, Brown, Green, Longmans & Roberts. OCLC 5045780.
- Telotte, Leigh Ehlers (2020). Victoria, Queen of the Screen: From Silent Cinema to New Media. Jefferson, NC: McFarland. ISBN 978-1-4766-7904-4.

==== Journals and magazines ====
- Dickens, Charles (5 July 1884). "The Boy Jones". All the Year Round. Vol. 34, no. 814. Chapman & Hall.
- Pentland, Gordon (April 2023). "'An Offence New in Its Kind': Responses to Assassination Attempts on British Royalty, 1800–1900". Journal of British Studies. 62 (2): 418–444. doi:10.1017/jbr.2022.177.
- "Varieties". Blackwood's Lady's Magazine. Vol. X. April 1841. p. 282.

==== News ====
- "Apprehension of a Stranger in her Majesty's Dressing-Room". The Times. 4 December 1840. p. 5.
- "The Boy Jones". The Times. 22 December 1841. p. 4.
- "The Boy Jones". The Times. 7 July 1841. p. 5.
- "The Boy Jones Again". The Times. 20 October 1842. p. 5.
- "The Boy Jones Again". Westmeath Independent. 6 October 1849. p. 4.
- Caldwell, Rebecca (11 February 2002). "A Thin Palace Plot". The Globe and Mail.
- de Bruxelles, Simon (2 February 2011). "Victoria's Secret: the Boy Stalker who Stole the Queen's Knickers". The Times. p. 11.
- "Devonshire". Royal Cornwall Gazette. 4 July 1856. p. 8.
- "Extraordinary Disappearance of the Boy Jones". The Times. 9 February 1842. p. 7.
- "An Interloper Discovered in the Queen's Palace". The Standard. 15 December 1838. p. 3.
- "The Late Intrusion into Buckingham Palace". The Times. 5 December 1840. p. 4.
- "Police". The Times. 15 December 1838. pp. 6–7.
- "The Queen's Visitor Again!". Weekly Chronicle. 21 March 1841. p. 5.
- "A Singular Case". The Atlas. 15 December 1838. p. 791.
- "Queen Victoria and the Stalker". Western Mail. 30 October 2010. p. 15.
- "Third Appearance of the Boy Jones at Buckingham Palace". The Times. 17 March 1841. p. 6.
- "Untitled". The Bairnsdale Advertiser. 28 December 1893. p. 2.
- "We have Received from a Correspondent". The Times. 7 December 1840. p. 4.
- "Westminster Sessions, Friday, Dec. 28". The Times. 29 December 1838. p. 7.

==== Websites ====
- Clark, Gregory (2023). "The Annual RPI and Average Earnings for Britain, 1209 to Present (New Series)". MeasuringWorth. Archived from the original on 1 April 2023.
- Murphy, Paul Thomas (2010). "Jones, Edward [nicknamed the Boy Jones]". Oxford Dictionary of National Biography (online ed.). Oxford University Press. doi:10.1093/ref:odnb/98193. (Subscription, Wikipedia Library access or UK public library membership required.)
- Queen Victoria. "Journal Entry: Thursday 3rd December 1840". Queen Victoria's Journals.
- "That Boy Jones". BBC Genome. 26 October 1992.
- "The Curious Case of the Boy Jones". FilmFreeway. Archived from the original on 9 October 2023.
- "The Mudlark (Original)". British Film Institute.
- "Tommy Rodger". Curtis Brown.
