= Rolfe =

Rolfe may refer to:

== People ==
- Rolfe (surname)
  - Robert Allen Rolfe, botanist for whom "Rolfe" is the standard abbreviation
- Rolfe (given name)

== Places ==
- Rolfe, Iowa, United States, a city
- Rolfe, West Virginia, United States, an unincorporated community

== Entertainment ==
- Rolfe Photoplays, an American motion picture production company
- Rolfe DeWolfe, the animatronic ventriloquist in The Rock-afire Explosion

== See also ==
- Rolfe's Chop House, a New York City eating establishment
- Rolfe Barn, Concord, New Hampshire, United States, on the National Register of Historic Places
- Rolf, a male given name and surname
- Rolfes, a surname and given name
- Rolfing, a holistic health discipline named after Ida P. Rolf
