= Rigdum Funnidus =

Rigdum Funnidus may refer to:

- Rigdum Funnidus, a collective pen-name of Horace Mayhew, Henry Mayhew and Robert Brough, nineteenth century editors of George Cruikshank's The Comic Almanack
- Rigdum Funnidus, a race horse, fl. 1796
