= Neville-Rolfe =

Neville-Rolfe is a British double-barrelled surname which may refer to:

- Lucy Neville-Rolfe (born 1953), British politician and businesswoman
- Sybil Neville-Rolfe (1885–1955), British social hygienist

== See also ==
- Neville (name)
- Rolfe (surname)
