= Rolfe (surname) =

The uncommon English surname Rolfe derives ultimately from the Old Scandinavian and Germanic pre 5th century personal name "Hrodwulf". This was composed of the elements hrod, meaning "renown", and wulf, a wolf. In Norse the contracted form was Hrolfr, in Danish and Swedish Rolf, and it is said that these personal names reached England first through their popularity with Scandinavian settlers before the Norman Conquest of 1066. The Normans thereafter introduced their own form of the name, generally found as "Rou" or "Roul" and often Latinised as "Rollo".

Notable people with the surname include:

- B. A. Rolfe (1879–1956), American musician, bandleader, radio personality, and film producer
- Chris Rolfe, American soccer player
- Emma Rolfe (1860–1874), English murder victim
- Frank Rolfe, American owner of trailer parks
- Frederick Rolfe (1860–1913), also known as "Baron Corvo", British writer and photographer
- Guy Rolfe, English actor
- James Rolfe (composer) (born 1961), Canadian composer
- James Rolfe (born 1980), American YouTuber, filmmaker, and actor
- John Rolfe (disambiguation), several people
- John Carew Rolfe, American classicist
- Lilian Rolfe, French World War II spy
- Louis Rolfe, British track cyclist
- Louisa Rolfe, British senior police officer
- Red Rolfe, American baseball player
- Rob Rolfe, drummer in English post-hardcore band Enter Shikari
- Robert Allen Rolfe (1855–1921), British botanist
- Thomas Rolfe, child of Lady Rebecca and John Rolfe
- William James Rolfe (1827–1910), American Shakespearean scholar

== See also ==
- Rolf
- Rolph
