= Rolfe (given name) =

Rolfe is a masculine given name which is borne by:

- Rolfe Humphries (1894–1969), American poet
- Rolfe Kanefsky (born 1969), American screenwriter and director
- Rolfe Kent (born 1963), British composer
- W. Rolfe Kerr (born 1935), an emeritus general authority of The Church of Jesus Christ of Latter-day Saints
- Rolfe Sedan (1896–1982), American actor
- Rolfe DeWolf, a fictional Wolf character and member of the Rock-Afire Explosion animatronic band that performed at ShowBiz Pizza locations

== See also ==
- Rolf, a given name and surname
