= Rolph =

Rolph is a surname and a masculine given name, and may refer to:

== Surname ==
- C. H. Rolph, pen-name of C. R. Hewitt (1901–1994), English police officer, journalist, editor, and author
- Ebony Rolph (born 1994), Australian basketball player
- Gary Rolph (born 1960), English football player
- George Rolph (1794–1875), Canadian lawyer and politician
- James Rolph (1869–1934), American politician
- Jessica Rolph (born 1974), American businesswoman
- John Rolph (1793–1870), Canadian physician, lawyer, and political figure
- John Rolph (judge), American lawyer and officer in the United States Navy's Judge Advocate General corps
- Sue Rolph (born 1978), British swimmer
- Thomas Rolph (1885–1956), American politician, representative from California
- Thomas Rolph (cricketer) (1840–1876), Canadian-born cricketer and lawyer, son of George Rolph

== Given name ==
- Rolph Barnes (1904–1982), Canadian athlete
- Rolph Grant (1909–1977), West Indian cricketer
- Rolph van der Hoeven (born 1948), Dutch academic and economist
- Justin Rolph Loomis (1810–1898), American academic
- Rolph Payet (born 1968), Seychelles academic and diplomat
- Rolph Ludwig Edward Schwarzenberger (1936–1992), British mathematician
- Michel-Rolph Trouillot (1949–2012), Haitian American academic and anthropologist

== See also ==
- Rolf
- Rolfe (surname)
