= Rolfes =

Rolfes may refer to:

== Surname ==
- Christine Rolfes (born 1967), American politician
- Hans Rolfes (1894–1935), German flying ace
- Herman Rolfes (born 1936), Canadian politician
- Ilona Rolfes (born 1973), German microwave engineer
- Simon Rolfes (born 1982), German footballer

== Given name ==
- Rolfes Robert Reginald Dhlomo (1906–1971), South African journalist and novelist

== See also ==
- Rolfe (disambiguation)
