= Jan Bondeson =

Swedish-British rheumatologist and author (born 1962)

- Born: 17 December 1962 (age 63)
- Occupations: Rheumatologist, scientist, author, lecturer

Jan Bondeson (born 17 December 1962) is a Swedish-British rheumatologist, scientist and author, working as a senior lecturer and consultant rheumatologist at the Cardiff University School of Medicine. He has also written non-fiction on topics such as medical anomalies and unsolved murders. In 2003 he told an interviewer, "I've always had a profound interest in history, especially the history of medicine, and a bit of a fancy for the macabre and odd." Bondeson is the biographer of a predecessor of Jack the Ripper, the London Monster, who stabbed 50 women in the buttocks, of Edward "the Boy" Jones, who stalked Queen Victoria and stole her underwear, and Greyfriars Bobby, a Scottish Terrier who supposedly spent 14 years guarding his master's grave.

== Career ==
Bondeson attended medical school at Lund University, Sweden, and qualified in 1988. He became a specialist in rheumatology and internal medicine, and defended his PhD thesis in 1996. He was awarded several scholarships to continue his scientific career at the Kennedy Institute of Rheumatology in London. He became a pioneer of the experimental use of adenoviral gene transfer to study intracellular signalling, and investigate the regulation of important cytokines and matrix metalloproteinases. In 2000, he was promoted to become senior lecturer and consultant rheumatologist at Cardiff University, doing a mixture of clinical work, teaching and research. Here, his research has concentrated on the role of synovial macrophages in osteoarthritis, and regulation of degradative enzymes in this disease. Bondeson has more than a hundred publications in refereed scientific journals, and continuing research grant support from Arthritis Research UK.

=== Writing ===
Bondeson has also written a series of books in the areas of the history of medicine and zoology, and some studies about curious historical episodes. His Cabinet of Medical Curiosities was published in 1997. Buried Alive, a historical study of the signs of death and the risk of being prematurely buried by mistake, was supported by a scholarship from the Wellcome Trust. The London Monster tells of a series of stabbings of London women between 1788 and 1790. The Great Pretenders (2003) is a study of historical cases of disputed identity, such as the Lost Dauphin of France, Kaspar Hauser and the Tichborne Claimant. Queen Victoria's Stalker (2010) concerns Edward "the Boy" Jones, a weird teenager who became obsessed with the youthful Queen Victoria and broke into Buckingham Palace to stalk her. After stealing the Queen's underclothes and spying on her in her dressing room, he was captured by government agents and forced to serve in the Royal Navy for more than five years without charge or trial.

In 2011, Bondeson published Amazing Dogs, a cabinet of canine curiosities exemplifying the cultural history of dogs. The most newsworthy chapter deals with German fascination with allegedly super-intelligent dogs: the so-called 'New Animal Psychology' movement believed that if they were trained to communicate using a sign language, they could become the intellectual equals of their owners. Remarkably, these beliefs were shared by some of the Nazis, who made experiments to create superdogs loyal to the Nazi Herrenvolk. The same year, Bondeson published Greyfriars Bobby, the Most Faithful Dog in the World, a thorough biography of Greyfriars Bobby, a Scottish Skye Terrier who supposedly kept vigil over his master's grave for 14 years. Original sources and newly discovered illustrations are employed to reinterpret the story of Greyfriars Bobby and describe the pan-European myth of the "Dog on the Master's Grave" and the many other graveyard or cemetery dogs at large in Victorian times. In 2012, he published Those Amazing Newfoundland Dogs, a full-length cultural history of the Newfoundland breed, with a profusion of old illustrations.

In 2013 came The True History of Jack the Ripper, about a 1905 novel about Jack the Ripper written by Guy Logan. The following year, his Murder Houses of London described Central London's archaeology of capital crime, in the shape of houses where notable murders had been committed. In 2015 came two more books on London's murder houses, covering South London and all the suburbs. In February 2016, his Rivals of the Ripper was a full-length study of unsolved murders of women in London during the late Victorian era. The most notable chapter deals with a string of unsolved murders of young girls in the West Ham area in the 1880s and 1890s, raising the possibility that a serial killer had been at work. In August 2016, he published Strange Victoriana, a collection of medical freaks, ghosts, strange animals, mysteries and Forteana from Victorian times, with illustrations from the old periodical Illustrated Police News. In January 2017 he produced The Ripper of Waterloo Road, about the murder of Eliza Grimwood in 1838, suggesting that she was one of four victims of a previously unrecognized early Victorian serial killer. In December 2017 came Victorian Murders, a collection of murder stories with illustrations from the Illustrated Police News, including the Llangibby Massacre of 1878 and the unsolved murder of Ann Reville in Slough in 1881. One notable chapter in the book concerns the 'Maidenhead Mystery' of 1893 and the Dutch serial killer Hendrik de Jong, thought by some at the time to have been Jack the Ripper. In March 2018 he published The Lion Boy and Other Medical Curiosities, his third book of strange and unexpected events in the history of medicine. One chapter concerns Johnny Trunley, an example of extreme obesity in Edwardian times, known as the Fat Boy of Peckham.

In July 2018, Phillimore's Edinburgh featured the old postcard artist Reginald Phillimore and his many felicitous paintings of various Edinburgh landmarks in Edwardian times, with a second volume, the 2020 Phillimore's East Lothian, dealing with some of his most superior cards from his own county. In 2020, he also published Murder Houses of Edinburgh, about the 'black plaque' houses of the Scottish capital. In 2021, he published Doctor Poison, the first biography of the murderous American doctor George Henry Lamson based on modern research. For many years, Bondeson has been a regular contributor to the Fortean Times, and he also writes for Edinburgh Life, East Lothian Life, Listed Heritage, Journal of the Whitechapel Society and Haunted Magazine, and used to contribute to BBC History and Picture Postcard Monthly magazines, as well as to the now defunct crime magazines True Detective, Dagger and Ripperologist. He also contributes to the Edinburgh Evening News and East Lothian Courier newspapers, among others.

== Selected works ==
- The Prolific Countess, Stichting oud Loosduinen 1996. Dutch translation.
- A Cabinet of Medical Curiosities, Cornell UP 1997 / IB Tauris UK paperback 1997 / WW Norton US paperback 1999. Japanese, Spanish, Portuguese, Swedish and Italian translations.
- The Feejee Mermaid and Other Essays in Natural and Unnatural History, Cornell UP 1999 / paperback 2014. Spanish and Swedish translations.
- The Two-Headed Boy and Other Medical Marvels, Cornell UP 2000 / paperback 2004. Chinese translation.
- The London Monster: A Sanguinary Tale, U Penn Press 2000. Da Capo Press paperback 2002. UK reissue in 2003 by History Press / paperback 2005.
- Buried Alive: The Terrifying History of Our Most Primal Fear, WW Norton 2001 / paperback 2002. German, Dutch and Spanish translations.
- The Great Pretenders: The True Stories behind Famous Historical Mysteries, WW Norton 2003 / paperback 2004. Japanese and Portuguese translations.
- The Pig-faced Lady of Manchester Square [revised UK version of Two-headed Boy], History Press 2004 / paperback as Freaks in 2006.
- Blood on the Snow: The Killing of Olof Palme, Cornell UP 2005 / paperback 2013. Danish translation.
- The Cat Orchestra and the Elephant Butler [revised UK version of Feejee Mermaid], History Press 2006 / paperback as Animal Freaks in 2008.
- Queen Victoria's Stalker: the strange story of the Boy Jones, Amberley Pub & Kent St UP 2010 / UK paperback 2011. Thai translation.
- Amazing Dogs: A Cabinet of Canine Curiosities, Amberley Pub & Cornell UP 2011 / UK paperback 2013. Italian translation.
- Greyfriars Bobby, the Most Faithful Dog in the World, Amberley Pub 2011 / paperback 2012.
- Those Amazing Newfoundland Dogs, CFZ Press 2012.
- The True History of Jack the Ripper [with Guy Logan], Amberley Pub 2013.
- Murder Houses of London, Amberley Pub 2014 / paperback 2015.
- Murder Houses of South London, Troubador Pub 2015 / reissue 2021.
- Murder Houses of Greater London, Troubador Pub 2015 / reissue 2021.
- Rivals of the Ripper, History Press 2016 / paperback 2021.
- Strange Victoriana, Amberley Pub 2016 / paperback 2018.
- The Ripper of Waterloo Road, History Press 2017.
- Victorian Murders, Amberley Pub 2017 / reissue 2019.
- The Lion Boy and Other Medical Curiosities, Amberley Pub 2018.
- Phillimore's Edinburgh, Amberley Pub 2018.
- Phillimore's East Lothian, Stenlake Pub 2020.
- Murder Houses of Edinburgh, Troubador Pub 2020 / reissues 2021 and 2022.
- Doctor Poison, Troubador Pub 2021.

== See also ==
- Nazi talking dogs
