= Hundesprechschule Asra =

German institution for performing dogs

The Hundesprechschule Asra or Tiersprechschule Asra (Asra school for talking dogs or Asra school for talking animals) was an institution for performing dogs that existed in Leutenberg, Thuringia, Germany, from 1930 until near the end of World War II. The founder, Margarethe Schmidt taught her dogs a number of tricks, including vocal expression, and had them perform in public. In 2011, a non-fiction book published in Great Britain by Jan Bondeson, Amazing Dogs: A Cabinet of Canine Curiosities led to interest in the English-speaking press. The book used it as an example of Nazi-sponsored animal research. However, there is no evidence of a connection to the Nazi war effort, and the school was privately run.

== History ==
The Hundesprechschule Asra was founded in 1930 by Margarethe Schmidt, whose father was the owner of the Leutenberg paper mill. She lived in Villa Viola, a house on the edge of the town of Leutenberg with her mother. (Note: Bondeson, von den Berg, and English-language newspapers spell her name "Schmitt." Many newspapers wrongly locate the school near Hanover.) The school was named Asra after an alleged particularly talented Great Dane,^{2} who was the mother of five of the six dogs at the school. Another dog, a terrier, was added later as a rescue. Near the end of the war, in 1945, the villa was occupied by increasingly large numbers of refugees and Margarethe Schmidt closed the school and moved to West Berlin.

Schmidt regularly demonstrated the dogs' alleged abilities in public in Leutenberg and the surrounding area. A printed brochure stated that "the animals not only add, subtract, multiply and divide, but also know the time ... . They read, ... judge colors, characterize those present precisely." A 13-year-old child evacuee described such a performance in November 1944, saying that the dogs could tell the time, describe people, and correct misspellings. He stated in a letter that the dogs "could speak and calculate and think" and expressed themselves by repeatedly ringing a bell. He stated that it was "not nonsense". Another contemporary witness, however, called the performance, which he saw as a child in the winter of 1945/46, "clearly a fraud". A different witness at the time, who was a frequent visitor to Villa Viola as a teenager in the 1940s and saw the performances several times, spoke of "artifices" or "tricks". They said the dogs could neither speak ("a drawn-out Maaamma was the only thing you could halfway understand") nor calculate; it was more a "trick" in which the dogs scratched at a block with a bell until the desired number was reached and they received a reward.

Max Müller, director of the municipal veterinary service in Munich and honorary professor at the veterinary faculty of LMU Munich,^{2} visited the school in 1942, at which time there was also a cat. He wrote an article about it in the Tierärztliche Mitteilungen. As "one of the greatest advocates of 'tapping-speaking' animals during the 1930s", Müller was firmly convinced that dogs were capable of independent thought. In his essay, Müller reports that the dogs can reproduce a series of words aloud and use them meaningfully, but were limited by the structure of their vocal apparatus. Furthermore, he reported that they could solve arithmetic problems, tell the date and read words by repeatedly barking or pressing an electric bell. He said they responded more fluently using a code of a number of barks (or rings of an electric bell in the case of the terrier) for each letter. However, according to some contemporary accounts, the training was only a show; the dogs' utterances were largely incomprehensible and their counting was a trained response. Another person who had attended a performance compared it to the circus, and recalled that the dogs did not speak, supposedly because it was too cold.

Müller also mentions that Margarethe Schmidt had offered Adolf Hitler "to make herself and her dogs available for the purposes of Wehrmacht use" and had received an affirmative response from the Führer's office. He expressed his hope that "according to the Führer's instructions, the members of the Wehrmacht will have the opportunity to convince themselves of the independent thinking of these animals and their direct and indirect ability to speak as part of the KdF (Strength Through Joy) program." However, there is no evidence that Schmidt actually appeared with her dogs for the Wehrmacht. There had been work in Germany on teaching dogs to reason and communicate throughout the nineteenth century. Beginning in 1910 a German pointer named Don became famous for being able to say that he was hungry and ask for cakes.^{56–64} The 'New Animal Psychology' (German: neue Tierpsychologie) had been developed by Karl Krall and others to characterize the reasoning abilities of animals, particularly canine examples such as the Airedale Terrier Rolf. This line of thought had many adherents in Germany in the 1920s.^{35–53} The 'New Animal Psychologists' believed that certain animals, such as dogs and horses, were nearly as intelligent as humans and could be trained to unlock their intellectual potential. According to an article published in Psychology Today, the Rolf case proved influential in the acceptance and development of the Nazi talking dog program using Hundesprechschule Asra.^{46–47}

== Public reception ==
In her 2008 dissertation The "New Animal Psychology" and its Scientific Representatives (from 1900 to 1945), Britt von den Berg, citing Müller's 1943 essay, mentions the Asra dog-speaking school as a "curiosity" and places it in the context of the great interest in speaking, calculating or thinking animals and in animal psychology in general that existed in Germany in the first half of the 20th century and was originally triggered by the case of Clever Hans.

== Jan Bondeson's Amazing Dogs ==
In early 2011, Swedish-British author Jan Bondeson mentioned the Hundesprechschule Asra in his Amazing Dogs: A Cabinet of Canine Curiosities as an example of Nazi experiments in animal-human communication.^{50} He told an interviewer, "Hitler was himself interested in the prospect of using educated dogs in the war effort, and he advised representatives of the German army to study their usefulness in the field." In the chapter 'Some Canine Intellectuals,' he briefly mentions the Asra dog-speaking school, based on von den Berg's dissertation. Bondeson mixes Müller's report with other reports of "talking dogs" from the Nazi era and misunderstands Müller's reference to troop support, which he quotes as follows: "According to Müller, representatives of the Wehrmacht had received instructions from the 'Führer' to convince themselves of the usefulness of these trained dogs in front-line operations." He also asks the rhetorical question of how such bizarre projects could have taken place if not with the support of the Nazi regime, and concludes with the question of whether the Nazis had tried to "develop a breed of super-intelligent stormtrooper dogs" that could communicate with their human masters.

These unsubstantiated speculations were reported by the British Daily Telegraph on May 24, 2011, after Bondeson's book was published. This article not only links the Asra dog-talking school to other "talking dogs" that Bondeson described in the book, but also claims that "the Nazis" wanted to build an "army of talking dogs". Bondeson himself told the Daily Telegraph that the dogs were acquired by the Office of the Reichsführer SS and that he suspected that they were intended to relieve SS officers of the burden of guarding concentration camps; however, these plans never came to fruition. Bondeson also told the Süddeutsche Zeitung that Hitler had recommended that senior SS officials take a look at the talking school and find out whether the communication techniques could be used for war.

In the days that followed, this report was picked up and spread by other press outlets, especially in the English-speaking world. This led to further distortions and false reports. Examples of the false rumors include that in the dog training school, the animals were trained by "veterinarians and animal psychologists"; that Hitler himself founded the school near Hanover; that the Nazis wanted to build up a troop of independently thinking war dogs that would take on tasks such as guarding, reconnaissance and covert surveillance, and for this purpose Nazi officials were sent out to recruit intelligent dogs for the school.

Many newspapers reported the school as a project to aid the war effort by training dogs to work as concentration camp guards, or in surveillance, and that promising dogs were recruited for it. Maureen Dowd wrote in an op-ed piece in The New York Times about strange Nazi plans that "[the] story set off a panting spate of 'Heel Hitler,' 'Furred Reich,' 'Wooffan SS' and 'Arf Wiedersehen' headlines in British tabloids and plenty of claims that Hitler was 'barking mad.'" Bondeson told the German Süddeutsche Zeitung that Hitler had ordered the SS to investigate the possible military utility of the training, and the newspaper labeled a picture of a Munich telepathy experiment from the book as having been taken at Asra.^{1}

Bondeson ascribed most of the successes to the Clever Hans effect, and said that press coverage had exaggerated what he wrote. In light of the media frenzy, Bondeson said in an interview with the BBC on 28 May 2011 that his work had been "trivialised" by the press. In the 1930s, there were a growing number of animal psychology schools that were promoted by the Nazis, especially Hitler, and examined for possible military use. Nazis encouraged research in animal psychology and were looking for military applications, "but that's a million miles away from the press claims—which get taller by the day—that the Nazis had a legion of talking, machine-gun-toting hounds, on the point of being unleashed on the allies."

While the press hype was short-lived, the myth of the "Nazis' talking dogs" survived on the Internet. As recently as 2019, a Russian-language website from Ukraine reported that at the school, experts had tried to give the animals a sense of poetry and fine literature; that there had been experiments on telepathic dog-human communication; and that Eva Braun's terrier had learned foreign languages there. They also reported that Adolf Hitler had supported the school because he was convinced that scientifically trained dogs could conquer the world.

Margarethe Schmidt's nephew and contemporary witnesses vehemently denied that Hundesprechschule Asra was sponsored by the Nazis, saying that if it had been, she would have been punished after the war. The performances were the only source of income for her and her mother, and although there were many committed party members in the town, Schmidt "complained over and over again about chicanery on the part of the authorities." Margarethe Schmidt and her mother had no other income during these years other than that from the dog show. In a postcard dated May 3, 1943, Schmidt complained that she no longer received any food for her dogs because she did not pay taxes and was neither breeding her animals nor doing "scientifically notable" training." She wrote that "dogs that dance, make please-please and say 'Mama'" were a scientific achievement. On the front of this postcard, the animals are shown with the caption "Six attentive artists". At the end of the war she wrote that there was a plan to kill the dogs, resettle her, and seize the house from her mother. Local contemporary witnesses described the unmarried "Hunde-Grete" or "Hunde-Schmidten" as "a bit eccentric" or as an "artist [...] a weird bird". When refugees were quartered in the villa after the end of the war, Schmidt closed the school and moved to West Berlin. She died there in the late 1950s or early 1960s according to her nephew. Nothing is known about the whereabouts of the dogs.

== See also ==
- Talking animal § Dogs (reports about "talking" dogs in other countries)
- Dog communication § Human speech

== Sources ==
- Max Müller. "Über das Sprechen von Tieren in Wortbegriffen des Menschen. Die Leutenberger Tier-Sprechschule ASRA." Tierärztliche Mitteilungen 24.7/8 (1943) 71–72 (in German)
- Britt von den Berg: Die „Neue Tierpsychologie" und ihre wissenschaftlichen Vertreter (von 1900 bis 1945). Tenea Verlag, Bristol/Berlin 2008 (zugleich veterinärmedizinische Dissertation, Tierärztliche Hochschule Hannover 2008), ISBN 978-3-86504-258-3 (Digitalisat, PDF, 8,1 MB) (mit Foto von Schmidt und ihren Hunden auf S. 124)
- Jan Bondeson: Amazing Dogs. A Cabinet of Canine Curiosities. Amberley, Stroud 2011, ISBN 978-1-84868-946-6
- Bildpostkarte: Schüler der Tier-Sprech-Schule ASRA v. der Huenenburg
