= Augustus Mayhew =

English journalist and author

Augustus Septimus Mayhew (1826 – 25 December 1875) was an English journalist and writer, born in London. He wrote in collaboration with his brother Henry such works as The Greatest Plague of Life, or the Adventures of a Lady in Search of a Good Servant (1847, illustrated by George Cruikshank), and he joined H. S. Edwards in the production of such farces as The Goose and the Golden Eggs (Strand Theatre, 1859); Christmas Boxes (Strand, 1860); The Four Cousins (Globe Theatre, 1871). From 1848 to 1850 he edited The Comic Almanac, to which he had been a contributor since 1845, and his individual productions include Paved with Gold, or the Romance and Reality of the London Streets (1857) and Faces for Fortunes (three volumes, 1865).

== Sources ==
- New General Catalog of Old Books and Authors
