= HMS Harlequin (1836) =

Brig-sloop of the Royal Navy

- Harlequin

History

United Kingdom
- Name: Harlequin
- Namesake: Harlequin
- Ordered: 28 March 1832
- Builder: Pembroke Dockyard
- Laid down: November 1832
- Launched: 18 March 1836
- Completed: 25 October 1836
- Commissioned: 16 August 1836
- Fate: Sold for scrap, August 1904

General characteristics
- Class & type: Racer-class brig-sloop
- Tons burthen: 432 81/94 bm
- Length: 100 ft 6 in (30.6 m) (Gun deck); 78 ft 10 in (24.0 m) (Keel)
- Beam: 32 ft 6 in (9.9 m)
- Draught: 12 ft 6 in (3.8 m)
- Depth: 15 ft 3 in (4.6 m)
- Complement: 110
- Armament: 2 × 9-pdr cannon; 14 × 32-pdr carronades

HMS Harlequin was a 16-gun Racer-class brig-sloop built for the Royal Navy during the 1830s.

== Description ==
Harlequin had a length at the gundeck of 100 feet 6 inches (30.6 m) and 78 feet 10 inches (24.0 m) at the keel. She had a beam of 32 feet 6 inches (9.9 m), a draught of 12 feet 6 inches (3.8 m) and a depth of hold of 15 feet 3 inches (4.6 m). The ship's tonnage was 432 81/94 tons burthen. The Racer class was armed with a pair of 9-pounder (or 18-pounder) cannon and fourteen 32-pounder carronades. The ships had a crew of 120 officers and ratings.

== Construction and career ==
Harlequin, the fifth ship of her name to serve in the Royal Navy, was ordered on 28 March 1832, laid down in November 1832 at Pembroke Dockyard, Wales, and launched on 18 March 1836. She was completed on 25 October at Plymouth Dockyard and commissioned on 16 August of the same year.
