= Rolf (Airedale Terrier) =

German Airedale Terrier noted for its intelligence

Rolf (died 1919) was an Airedale Terrier that was claimed to have been able to perform arithmetic and communicate with humans on an intellectual level.

== Claims ==
According to Rolf's owner, Paula Moekel of Mannheim, Germany, the dog could communicate with humans by tapping out letters with his paw. He assigned the highest number of taps to less common letters. According to Moekel, the dog was a poet, a bibliophile and a 'speaker' of several languages. In her biography of Rolf she even claimed that the dog dabbled in deep theology and philosophy. These claims attracted attention in Germany, as they came at the height of the 'New Animal Psychology' movement. The 'New Animal Psychologists', led by Dr. Karl Krall, believed that certain animals, such as dogs and horses, were nearly as intelligent as humans and could be trained to unlock their intellectual potential. A colleague of Krall's, Professor H.E Ziegler of the University of Stuttgart, studied Rolf at his home and came away impressed, as did a Dr. William McKenzie. However, a study by doctors Wilhelm Neumann and Ferdinand Lothar concluded that Rolf was merely reacting to unconscious signals from his master. According to an article published in Psychology Today, the Rolf case proved influential in developing the Nazi talking dog programme.

== See also ==
- List of individual dogs
- Clever Hans effect
- Talking animal

== Bibliography ==
- Bondeson, Jan, (2011), Amazing Dogs: A Cabinet of Canine Curiosities, Amberley Pub & Cornell UP.
- Moekel, Paula, (1920), Mein hund Rolf, ein rechnender und buchstabierender Airedale-terrier, Stuttgart, R. Lutz.
