= Thomas Rolph (cricketer) =

Canadian cricketers

Personal information
- Full name: Thomas Lawford Rolph
- Born: 13 February 1840; Dundas, Upper Canada
- Died: 5 September 1876 (aged 36); Barnwood, Gloucestershire, England
- Batting: Unknown
- Bowling: Unknown
- Relatives: George Rolph (father); John Rolph (uncle); Alfred Renshaw (brother-in-law)

Domestic team information
- Years: Team
- 1860: Cambridge University

Career statistics
Competition	First-class
Matches	1
Runs scored	0
Batting average	0.00
100s/50s	0/0
Top score	0
Catches/stumpings	1/–
- Source: Cricket Archive, 25 April 2020

Thomas Lawford Rolph (13 February 1840 – 5 September 1876) was a Canadian-born lawyer and a cricketer who played in a single first-class cricket match for Cambridge University in 1860. He was born in Dundas, Canada, and died at Gloucester in England.

The elder son of the Canadian politician George Rolph, Thomas Rolph was educated in England at Cheltenham College and at Trinity Hall, Cambridge. He played cricket as a middle-order batsman for his school, but when selected for a single match for Cambridge University against the Cambridge Town Club he failed to score in either innings and was not picked again. He played a few minor cricket matches for amateur sides both during his time at Cambridge and afterwards, but played no more first-class cricket.

Rolph graduated from Cambridge University in 1863 with a Bachelor of Arts degree. He became a solicitor and was part of the London firm of Renshaw and Rolph, with offices in Cannon Street. He married Edith Anna Renshaw on 8 December 1875.

He died in Barnwood, Gloucestershire on 5 September 1876, aged 36.

His brother-in-law Alfred Renshaw played first-class cricket for the Marylebone Cricket Club in 1871.
