= John Rolfe (disambiguation) =

John Rolfe (1585–1622) was an English settler of Virginia and husband of Pocahontas.

John Rolfe may also refer to:

- John Carew Rolfe (1859–1943), American classicist
- John Rolfe (actor) (1935–2020), British actor
- John Rolfe (sport shooter) (fl. 1990s), British sports shooter

== See also ==
- John Rolph (1793–1870), Canadian politician
- John Rolph (judge) (fl. 1970s–2000s), American judge
- John Ralph (born 1954), New Zealand-born, American chemist, wood scientist, and professor
