= Horace Mayhew (journalist) =

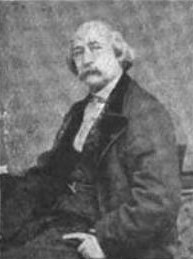
Horace Mayhew, from a photograph by Bassano

Horace Mayhew (1816 – 30 April 1872) was an English journalist, a writer of humorous sketches and a sub-editor of the magazine Punch.

== Life ==
He was born in London, son of Joshua Dorset Joseph Mayhew, a lawyer, and his wife Mary Ann Fenn. Henry Mayhew, a co-founder of the magazine Punch, and the writer Augustus Mayhew were brothers. He initially trained to be a lawyer, but turned to journalism. In 1845 he was one of the contributors to George Cruikshank's Table Book. For a time he was Mark Lemon's sub-editor on the staff of Punch. In December 1847 his play Plum Pudding Pantomime was produced at the Olympic Theatre.

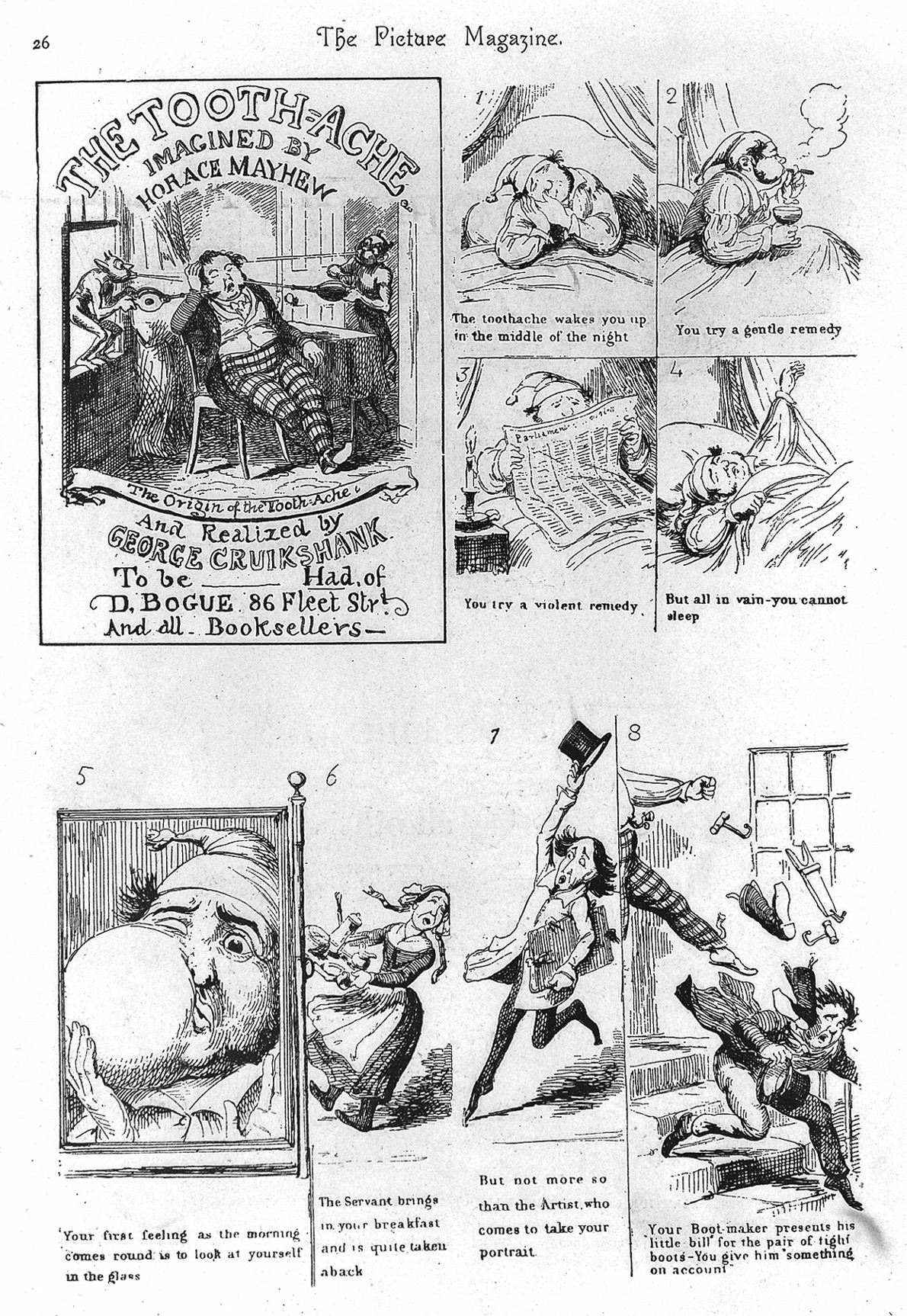
The Toothache, "imagined by Horace Mayhew and realized by George Cruikshank".

In 1848 Mayhew published the humorous sketches Change for a Shilling, Model Men, Model Women and Children, and an edition of Cruikshank's Comic Almanac; in 1849 A Plate of Heads, with Paul Gavarni's drawings; The Toothache, with drawings by Cruikshank; another issue of the Comic Almanac, with Cruikshank's illustrations; and Guy Faux.

From 1852, the year it passed under Douglas Jerrold's editorship, he became a frequent contributor to Lloyd's Weekly Newspaper. In 1853 he wrote Letters left at the Pastry-cook's. The death of his father about 1857 left him in easy circumstances, and he wrote little in later years. Mayhew married in 1868 Emily Sarah Fearon, the widowed daughter of an army officer; they had no children.

John Andrew Hamilton wrote: "He was a handsome, captivating man, a brilliant talker and raconteur, and was very popular in society."
