= Henry Mayhew =

British writer and activist (1812–1887)

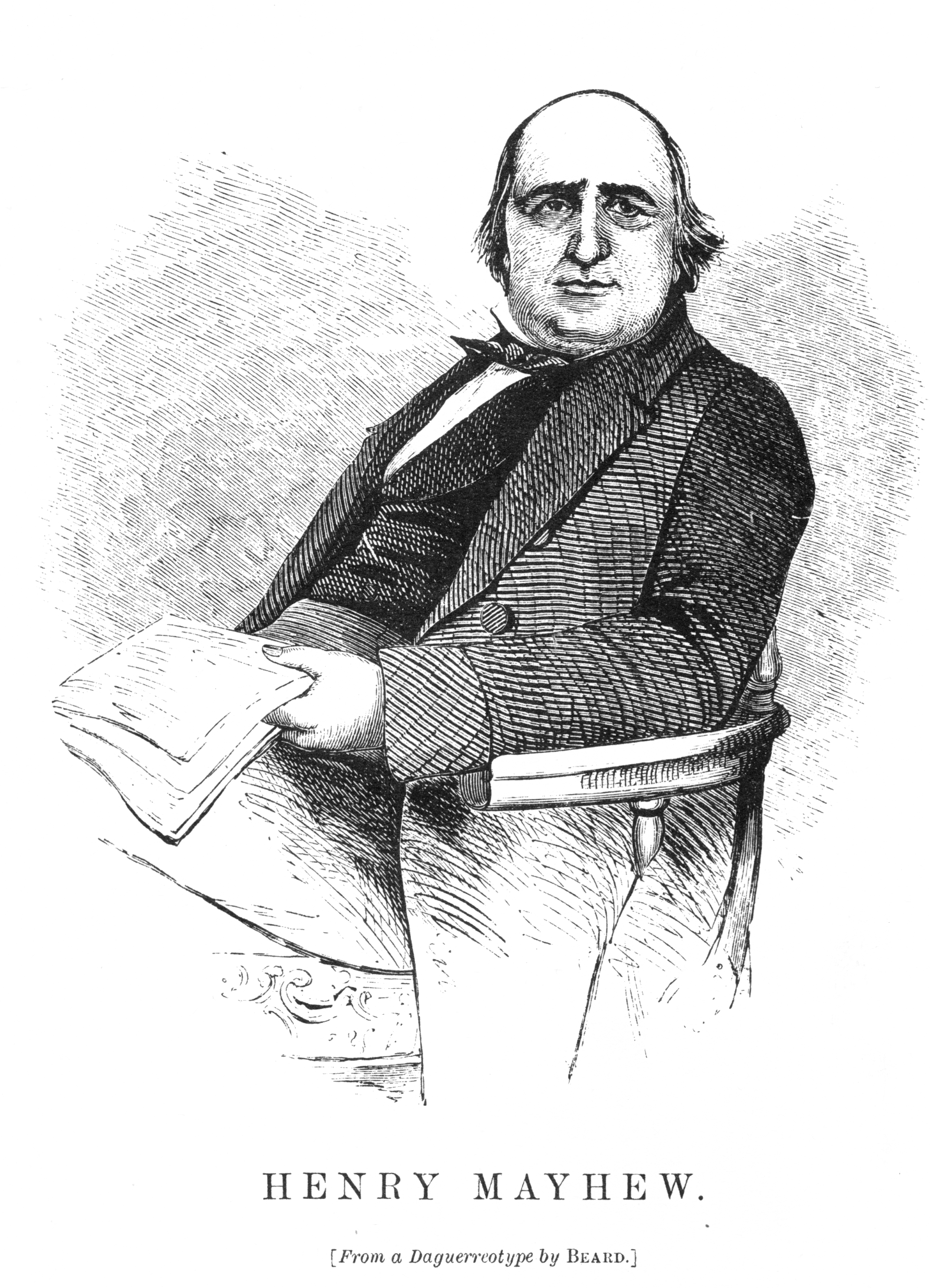
- Portrait of Mayhew, woodcut print after a daguerreotype by Richard Beard in London Labour and the London Poor, vol. I (1851)
- Born: 25 November 1812; Crewe
- Died: 25 July 1887 (aged 74); London
- Education: Westminster School
- Occupations: English journalist, playwright, and advocate of reform.
- Known for: Co founder of Punch magazine and London Labour and the London Poor

Henry Mayhew (25 November 1812 – 25 July 1887) was an English journalist, playwright, and advocate of reform. He was one of the co-founders of the satirical magazine Punch in 1841, and was the magazine's joint editor, with Mark Lemon, in its early days. He is also known for his work as a social researcher, publishing an extensive series of newspaper articles in the Morning Chronicle that was later compiled into the three-volume book London Labour and the London Poor (1851), a groundbreaking and influential survey of the city's poor.

== Biography ==
=== Early life ===
He was born in London, the thirteenth of 17 children to Joshua Mayhew. He was educated at Westminster School before running away from his studies to the sea. He then served with the East India Company as a midshipman on a ship bound for Calcutta. He returned after several years, in 1829, becoming a trainee lawyer in Wales. He left this career to become a freelance journalist. He contributed to The Thief, a readers' digest, followed quickly by founding a weekly comic journal – Figaro in London (1831–1839). Mayhew reputedly fled his creditors and holed up at the Erwood Inn, a small public house in the village of Erwood, south of Builth Wells in Wales.

=== Paris and writing ===
In 1835, Mayhew found himself in a state of debt and, along with a fellow writer, escaped to Paris to avoid his creditors. He spent his time writing and in the company of other writers including William Thackeray and Douglas Jerrold. Mayhew spent over 10 years in Paris, returning to England in the 1850s, whereupon he was involved in several literary adventures, mostly the writing of plays. Two of his plays – The Wandering Minstrel (1834) and But, However (1842) – were successful, whilst his early work Figaro in London was less successful.

=== Punch magazine ===
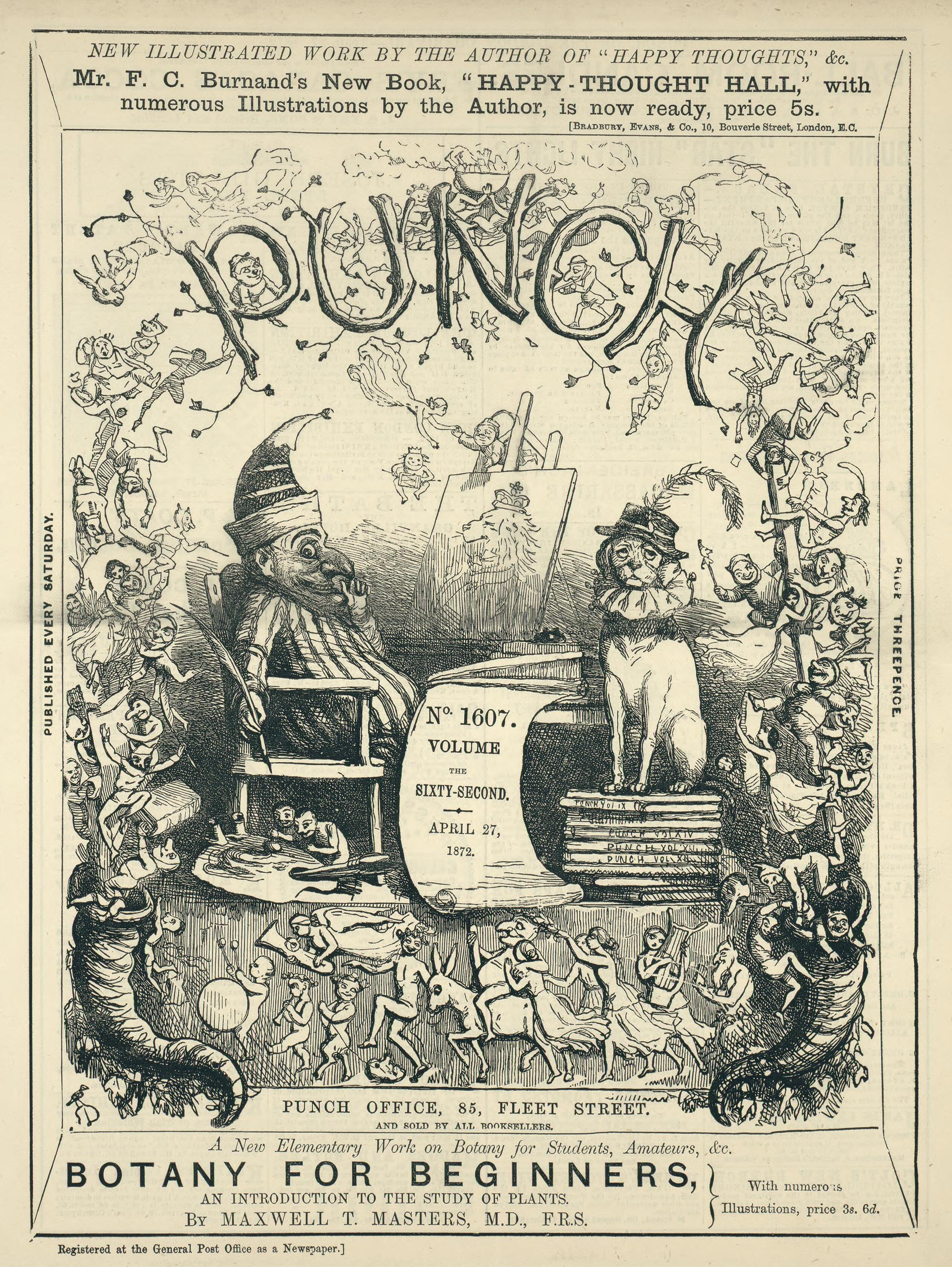
Punch was co-founded by Mayhew in 1841.

On 17 July 1841, Mayhew cofounded Punch magazine. At its founding, the magazine was jointly edited by Mayhew and Mark Lemon. The two men hired a group of writers and illustrators to aid them. These included Douglas Jerrold, Angus Reach, John Leech, Richard Doyle, and Shirley Brooks. Initially, the magazine was subtitled The London Charivari, referencing the satirical humour magazine published in France under the title Le Charivari (a work Mayhew read often whilst in Paris). Reflecting their satirical and humorous intent, the two editors took for their name and masthead the anarchic glove puppet Mr. Punch.

Punch was an unexpected success, selling about 6,000 copies a week in the early years. However, sales of as many as 10,000 issues a week were required to cover all costs of the magazine. In December 1842, the magazine was sold to Bradbury and Evans; Mayhew resigned as joint editor, and he continued at the magazine as "suggestor in chief" with Mark Lemon reappointed as editor. Mayhew eventually severed his connection with the magazine, writing his last article in February 1845. His brother Horace stayed on the board of Punch until his own death.

The Punch years gave Mayhew the opportunity to meet talented illustrators whom he later employed to work from daguerreotypes on London Labour and the London Poor. Following Punch, Mayhew launched Iron Times, a railway magazine. However, this venture lost Mayhew so much money that he was forced to appear in a court of bankruptcy in 1846.

=== Formative work ===
In 1842, Mayhew contributed to the pioneering Illustrated London News. By this time, he had become reasonably secure financially, had settled his debts, and married Jane Jerrold, the daughter of his friend Douglas Jerrold. She lived until 1880.

==== London Labour and the London Poor ====
The articles comprising London Labour and the London Poor were initially collected into three volumes in 1851; the 1861 edition included a fourth volume, co-written with Bracebridge Hemyng, John Binny, and Andrew Halliday, on the lives of prostitutes, thieves, and beggars. This extra volume took a more general and statistical approach to its subject than volumes one to three.

Mayhew wrote in volume one: "I shall consider the whole of the metropolitan poor under three separate phases, according as they will work, they can't work, and they won't work". He interviewed everyone – beggars, street-entertainers (such as Punch and Judy men), market traders, prostitutes, labourers, sweatshop workers, even down to the "mudlarks" who searched the stinking mud on the banks of the River Thames for wood, metal, rope, and coal from passing ships, and the "pure-finders" who gathered dog faeces to sell to tanners. He described their clothes, how and where they lived, their entertainments and customs, and made detailed estimates of the numbers and incomes of those practising each trade. The books show how marginal and precarious many people's lives were, in what, at that time, was the richest city in the world.

Mayhew's richly detailed descriptions give an impression of what the street markets of his day were like. An example from volume one:

The pavement and the road are crowded with purchasers and street-sellers. The housewife in her thick shawl, with the market-basket on her arm, walks slowly on, stopping now to look at the stall of caps, and now to cheapen a bunch of greens. Little boys, holding three or four onions in their hand, creep between the people, wriggling their way through every interstice, and asking for custom in whining tones, as if seeking charity. Then the tumult of the thousand different cries of the eager dealers, all shouting at the top of their voices, at one and the same time, is almost bewildering. "So-old again," roars one. "Chestnuts all'ot, a penny a score," bawls another. "An 'aypenny a skin, blacking," squeaks a boy. "Buy, buy, buy, buy, buy– bu-u-uy!" cries the butcher. "Half-quire of paper for a penny," bellows the street stationer. "An 'aypenny a lot ing-uns." "Twopence a pound grapes." "Three a penny Yarmouth bloaters." "Who'll buy a bonnet for fourpence?" "Pick 'em out cheap here! three pair for a halfpenny, bootlaces." "Now's your time! beautiful whelks, a penny a lot." "Here's ha'p'orths," shouts the perambulating confectioner. "Come and look at 'em! here's toasters!" bellows one with a Yarmouth bloater stuck on a toasting fork. "Penny a lot, fine russets," calls the apple woman: and so the Babel goes on.

Some of the London street traders did not like the way Mayhew wrote about them. In spring/summer 1851, they established a Street Trader's Protection Association to guard themselves against the journalist.

His articles about the extreme poverty of some of those he came into contact with moved readers of the Morning Chronicle to send money to the newspaper for Mayhew to distribute to the most needy. He sometimes found employment for those in need of work.

== Family ==
Mayhew was the grandfather of Audrey Mayhew Allen (b. 1870), an author of a number of children's stories published in various periodicals, and of Gladys in Grammarland, an imitation of Lewis Carroll's Wonderland books.

== Influence ==
Mayhew's work was embraced by and was an influence on the Christian Socialists, such as Thomas Hughes, Charles Kingsley, and F. D. Maurice. Radicals also published sizeable excerpts from the reports in the Northern Star, the Red Republican, and other newspapers. The often sympathetic investigations, with their immediacy and unswerving eye for detail, offered unprecedented insights into the condition of the Victorian poor. Alongside the earlier work of Edwin Chadwick, they are also speculated as a decisive influence on the thinking of Charles Dickens

Mayhew's work inspired the script of director Christine Edzard's 1990 film The Fool. Mayhew has appeared as a character in television and radio histories of Victorian London; he was played by Timothy West in the documentary London (2004), and David Haig in the Afternoon Play A Chaos of Wealth and Want (2010). In the 2012 novel Dodger by Terry Pratchett, Mayhew and his wife appear as fictionalised versions of themselves, and he is mentioned in the dedication.

== Publications, plays and public speeches: a select list ==
Although Mayhew is most remembered for his works of non-fiction, he also authored many plays, farces, novels, public speeches (many of which have been transcribed and subsequently published) alongside his numerous works of non-fiction and newspaper articles.

- 1831 Figaro in London, weekly, radical paper, co-founded and edited by Mayhew)
- 1832 The Thief, periodical
- 1834: The Wandering Minstrel: A Farce in One Act, farce, first performed at the Fitzroy Royal Theatre, 16 January 1834)
- 1838: But, however: A Farce in One Act, play by Henry Mayhew and Henry Bayliss)
- 1841-1842: Punch, satirical magazine, co-founded with Mark Lemon, Ebenezer Landells and possibly others)
- 1844: The Comic Almanack , vol 2, 1844, co-authored with William Makepeace Thackery, Gilbert Abbott à Beckett, Horace Mayhew (brother) and Albert Smith)
- 1847: The Greatest Plague of Life: or, the Adventures of a Lady in Search of a Good Servant, Carey and Hart, London. Satirical novel, co-authored with his brother Augustus Mayhew
- Oct. 1849–Oct. 1850: Survey of Labour and the Poor, series of 82 letters, surveying the conditions of the nation's labouring population as published in The Morning Chronicle
  - 1851–1862: London Labour and the London Poor, 4 volumes, 1851 (I), 1861 (II, III), and 1862 (IV, reprinted 1865), based on the Morning Chronicle articles
- 1851 The Adventures of Mr. and Mrs. Sandboys and Family, who Came up to London to Enjoy Themselves and See the Great Exhibition, George Newbold, London, 1851 [comic novel]
- 1856: "The Great World of London", pamphlet series
- 1862: The Criminal Prisons of London: And Scenes of Prison Life
- 1871: London Characters and the Humorous Side of London Life: with upwards of seventy illustrations, Stanley Rivers, London 1871.
