= Rolf =

Rolf is a male given name and a surname. It originates in the Germanic name Hrolf, itself a contraction of Hrodwulf (Rudolf), a conjunction of the stem words hrod ("renown") + wulf ("wolf"). The Old Norse cognate is Hrólfr. An alternative but less common variation of Rolf in Norway is Rolv.

The oldest evidence of the use of the name Rolf in Sweden is an inscription from the 11th century on a runestone in Forsheda, Småland. The name also appears twice in the Orkneyinga sagas, where a scion of the jarls of Orkney, Gånge-Rolf, is said to be identical to the Viking Rollo who captured Normandy in 911. This Saga of the Norse begins with the abduction of Gói daughter by a certain Hrolf of Berg, (the Mountain). She is the daughter of Thorri, a Jotun of Gandvik, and sister of Gór and Nór. The latter is regarded as a first king and eponymous anchestor of Nórway. After a fierce duell (Holmgang) where none is able to overcome the other, Hrolf and Nór become friends; Góí apparently was abducted willingly and marries Hrolf. Nór marries Hedda, Hrolf's sister. Goi may be identical, or reflect the story of the Jotunn and Åsynja Gefhjón who fools the Swedish King Gylfi of Uppsala, plowing the lands where the great lakes in Sweden are, making the island of Zealand (and some more of the Danish islands, but not Fyn) and establishes the high seat of the Scyldings at Lejre (Hliðarbru) the proposed main artificial island. Hroðulf of the Beowolf epic may be conferred as well as the Saga of Hrolf Kraki. Rolf is a first name or part of a double name or a longer name in Sweden, Norway, Germany, Finland and Denmark, and to a lesser extent in Iceland.

In Europe, the name Rolf is most popular in Sweden where, as of 2012, there were 54,737 people with Rolf as their first name or part of a double or a longer name. At the same time there were 511 people in Sweden with Rolf as their last name. As a given name, Rolf reached its peak in popularity in the decade of the 1960s.

The name day for Rolf in both Norway and Sweden is August 27. The Day for Rolf on the Finnish-Swedish calendar is March 6.

Notable Rolfs or Hrolfs include:

== Given names ==
- Hrólf Kraki, legendary king of Denmark
- Göngu-Hrólfr, Norwegian jarl that Orkneyinga Saga identifies with Rollo, the Viking conqueror of Normandy
- Rolf Becker (1935–2025), German actor
- Rolf Beeler, Swiss cheese entrepreneur
- Rolf-Göran Bengtsson (born 1962), Swedish equestrian jumper
- Rolf Benirschke (born 1955), American footballer and game show host
- Rolf Bernhard (born 1949), Swiss long jumper
- Rolf Billberg (1930–1966), Swedish musician
- Rolf de Heer (born 1951), Dutch-Australian film director
- Rolf Ekéus (born 1935), Swedish diplomat
- Rolf Ericson (1922–1997), Swedish musician
- Rolf Falk-Larssen (born 1960), Norwegian speed skater
- Rolf G. Fjelde (1926–2002), American playwright, educator and poet
- Rolf Forsberg (1925–2017), Swedish-American playwright, film and theater director
- Rolf Gindorf (1939–2016), German sexologist
- Rolf Gölz (born 1962), German road and track cyclist
- Rolf Groven (1943–2025), Norwegian painter
- Rolf Harris (1930–2023), Australian entertainer and sex offender
- Rolf Hauge (officer) (1915–1989), Norwegian army officer
- Rolf Hochhuth (1931–2020), German author and playwright
- Rolf Jacobsen (poet) (1907–1994), Norwegian author
- Rolf Kanies (born 1957), German actor
- Rolf Knie (born 1949), Swiss painter and actor
- Rolf Løvland (born 1955), Norwegian composer
- Rolf Mützelburg (1913–1942), German U-Boat commander during World War II
- Rolf Mützenich (born 1959), German politician
- Rolf Nevanlinna (1895–1980), Finnish mathematician
- Rolf Rämgård (born 1934), Swedish politician and skier
- Rolf Rheborg (1922–1983), Swedish Navy rear admiral
- Rolf Riehm (1937–2026), German composer, oboist and academic teacher
- Rolf Roosalu (Rolf Junior), Estonian singer
- Rolf Jacob Sartorius (born 2002), American singer and internet meme
- Rolf Schimpf (1924–2025), German actor
- Rolf Schläfli (born 1971), Swiss decathlete
- Rolf Singer (1906–1994), German mycologist
- Rolf Skoglund (1940–2022), Swedish actor
- Rolf Sohlman (1900–1967), Swedish diplomat
- Rolf Sohlman (born 1954), Swedish actor
- Rolf Sørensen (born 1965), Danish road bicycle racer
- Rolf Steiner (born 1933), German retired mercenary
- Rolf Stommelen (1943–1983), German racing driver
- Rolf Daniel Vikstøl (born 1989), Norwegian footballer
- Rolf Wenkhaus (1917–1942), German actor
- Rolv Wesenlund (1936–2013), Norwegian actor
- Rolf Widerøe (1902–1996), Norwegian particle physicist
- Rolf Wirtén (1931–2023), Swedish politician
- Rolf M. Zinkernagel (born 1944), Swiss immunologist
- Rolf Zuckowski (born 1947), German singer-songwriter

== Surname ==
- Ernst Rolf (1891–1932), Swedish actor and singer
- Tom Rolf (1931–2014), Swedish-born American film editor, son of Ernst
- Ida P. Rolf (1896–1979), American biochemist and founder of rolfing

== Fictional characters ==
- Rolf, a cranky cartoon tiger in the Animal Crossing game series
- Rolf, a Peach Creek Cul-de-Sac kid from the Cartoon Network animated series Ed, Edd n Eddy
- Rolf, tragic hero of Phantasy Star II
- Rolf, a character in the Fire Emblem series
- Rolf Gruber, the delivery boy (and Nazi volunteer) in the play The Sound of Music
- Rowlf, an easy-going Muppet dog who plays the piano
- Rolf, a German Shepherd dog from Polish film Border Street
- Rolf, a character and protagonist in Isabel Allende's third novel Eva Luna
- Rolf, a fighter in the video game Galaxy Fight: Universal Warriors
- Rolf, son of Rolf, a self-proclaimed nobleman from the video game Mount & Blade
- Rölf, a recurring canine character in Non sequitur
- Rölf, one of the four eponymous brothers of The Fusco Brothers

== See also ==
- Rolph, a surname
