= Pinta Art Show =

Pinta Art Show annually exhibits modern and contemporary artworks from Latin American artists in international settings. Based in New York City, the art fair also travels to London, allowing visitors, galleries, artists, collectors, curators, and cultural institutions to strengthen their existing knowledge and develop new connections with the Latin American art world. Pinta features works by both emergent and established visual artists. Art pieces range in diversity from concrete, neo-concrete, and kinetic to conceptual and abstract.

== Background ==
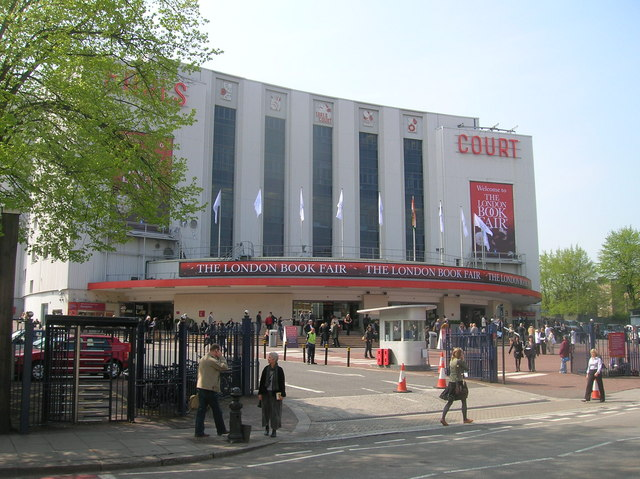
Earls Court Exhibition Centre, where Pinta London premiered in 2007.

Pinta New York takes place in New York City every year; its first exhibition occurred in 2007. The show coincides with Christie's and Sotheby's Latin American art auctions as well as several major exhibitions in museums and cultural institutions during the month of November. This art fair was the first to focus solely on Latin American artists to be held in New York City.

Pinta London premiered from 3–6 June 2010 at Earls Court Exhibition Centre, featuring approximately 50 galleries from the Americas and Europe.

As of 2007, Pinta is headed by Diego Costa Peuser, Alejandro Zaia and Mauro Herlitzka. Diego Costa Peuser, the Fair Director, is currently the publisher of Arte al Día Internacional magazine, and he is also the director of the arteaméricas fair in Miami and of Buenos Aires Photo. Chairman Alejandro Zaia is also Chair of Conexion PR/ZCM, a public relations firm based in Miami and South America. Mauro Herlitzka, Pinta's Institutional Director, is the current President of Fundación Espigas.

== New York, U.S. Exhibitions ==
=== 2011 ===
Held from 10–13 November 2011.

=== 2010 ===
Held from 11–14 November at Pier 92. Featured artists including:

- Antonio Asis
- Hércules Barsotti
- Sandra Bermudez
- Leda Catunda
- Marta Chilindron
- Gustavo Diaz
- Claudia Edinger
- Adrian Guerrero
- Ides Kihlen
- Hirosuke Kitamura
- Vik Muniz
- Raom & Loba
- Res
- Ofelia Rodriquez
- Pedro Ruiz
- Ivan Serpa
- Courtney Smith

=== 2009 ===
Held from 19–22 November at Metropolitan Pavilion. Featured artists included:

- Teresa Aninat & Catalina Swinburn
- Claudia Bueno
- Leda Catunda
- Valdir Cruz
- Marina Di Paola
- Willie Doherty
- Darío Escobar
- Enio Iomi
- Richard Garet
- Fabiano Gonper
- Wifredo Lam
- Gerd Leufert
- Juan Mele
- Lygia Pape
- Teresa Pereda
- Rosana Ricalde
- Antonia Robirosa
- Doris Salcedo
- José Luis Serzo
- Dionne Simpson
- Horacio Zabula

=== 2008 ===
Held from 13–16 November at Metropolitan Pavilion, with 56 galleries. Featured artists included:

- Soledad Arias
- Fernando Bryce
- Diego Bianchi
- Martha Boto
- Lothar Charoux
- Carlos Cruz-Diez
- Lucio Dorr
- Alex Flemming
- Paula Gabriela
- Ana Gallardo
- Gyula Kosice
- Maria Noël
- Nadín Ospin
- Alejandro Otero
- Macjob Parababis
- Luis Romero
- Mira Schendel
- Eduardo Stupia
- Sandra Valenzuela
- Viviana Zargón

=== 2007 ===
Held from 16–20 November at Metropolitan Pavilion, with 34 galleries. Featured artists included:

- Alexandre Arrechea
- Tony Bechara
- Waltércio Caldas
- Eugenia Calvo
- Arturo Duclos
- Darío Escobar
- León Ferrari
- María Freire
- Gego
- Nicolas Guagnini
- Wifredo Lam
- Marco Maggi
- Damián Ontiveros Ramírez
- Liliana Porter
- Fanny Sanín
- Xul Solar
- Jesús Rafael Soto
- Eduardo Ramírez Villamizar

== London, U.K. Exhibitions ==
=== 2011 ===
Held from 6–9 June at Earls Court Exhibition Centre. Featured artists include:

- Alejandra Alarcó
- Waltercio Caldas
- Saint Clair Cemin
- Emilio Chapela
- Patricio Ditborn
- Felipe Ehrenberg
- Elizabeth Jobim
- Judith Lauand
- Raúl Lozza
- Santiago Montoya
- Maggie Murua
- Iván Navarro
- Sachiyo Nishimura
- Wanda Pimentel
- Dulce Pinzon
- Arturo Quintero
- Nuno Ramos
- Carmen Reategui
- Eduardo Rincón
- Shoplifter
- Regina Silveira
- Estela Sokol
- Pedro Tyler
- Pablo Vargas Lugo
- Cássio Vasconcellos
- Manuela Viera-Gallo
- Ani Villanueva
- Carlos Zuniga

Galleries in attendance:

- Aina Nowack, AAC, Madrid
- Aninat Isabel, Santiago
- Anita Schwartz Galeria de Arte, Rio de Janeiro
- Arevalo Gallery, Miami
- Artana Latin American Art, The Hague
- Artworx.b146, Zurich
- Baró Galeria, São Paulo
- Blanca Berlín Galería, Madrid
- Bolsa de Arte, Porto Alegre
- Celma Albuquerque, Belo Horizonte
- Christopher Paschall Galeria s. XXI, Bogotá
- Cosmocosa, Buenos Aires
- Distrito 4, Madrid
- Durban Segnini, Miami
- Edel Assanti, London
- Espacio Mínimo, Madrid
- Estudio Arte 8, Caracas
- Frederico Sève Gallery, New York
- Galería AFA, Santiago
- Galería Barcelona, Barcelona
- Galería Cayón SL, Madrid
- Galería Enrique Guerrero, Mexico, DF
- Galería La Caja Negra, Madrid
- Galería Lucia de la Puente, Lima
- Galeria Matilde Bensignor, Buenos Aires
- Galeria Nara Roesler, São Paulo
- Galería Rafael Ortiz, Sevilla
- Galeria Sicart, Barcelona
- Galerie Thomas Schulte, Berlin
- GC Estudio de Arte, Buenos Aires
- Guillermo de Osma Galería, Madrid
- Habana, Habana
- Hardcore Art Contemporary Space, Miami
- Henrique Faría Fine Art, New York
- Josée Bienvenu, New York
- LGM Arte Internacional, Bogotá
- Luciana Brito Galeria, São Paulo
- Maddox Arts, London
- Magda Bellotti, Madrid
- Max Estrella, Madrid
- Pan American Art Projects, Miami
- Praxis International Art, New York
- Ruth Benzacar Galería de Arte, Buenos Aires
- Salar Galería de Arte, La Paz
- Sammer Gallery, LLC, Miami
- Selma Feriani Gallery, London
- Stephen Friedman Gallery, London
- Tasneem Gallery, Barcelona
- Tatiana Kourochkina galeria d'art, Barcelona
- Teresa Anchorena, Buenos Aires
- The Americas Collection, Miami
- Vermelho, São Paulo
- Y Gallery, New York

=== 2010 ===
Held from 3–6 June at Earls Court Exhibition Centre. Including featured artists:

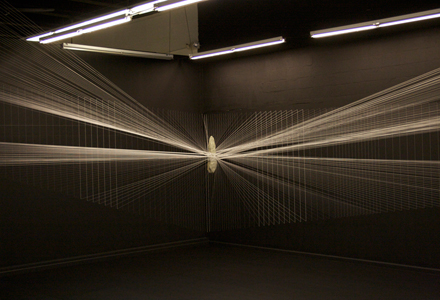
A Milton Becerra installation displayed at Pinta London 2010.

- Milton Becerra
- Carlos Blanco
- Starsky Brines
- Leonora Carrington
- Nicola Costantino
- Juan Downey
- Laura Erber
- Julie L. Friel
- Joel Grossman
- Carmen Herrera
- Daniel Juarez
- Glenda León
- Los Carpinteros
- Hugo Lugo
- Catalina Mena
- Mondongo
- Yoshua Okón
- Laura Ortiz
- Jorge Pardo
- Rolando Peña
- Lucia Pizzani
- Liliana Porter
- Omar Rayo
- Rosana Ricalde
- Cristina Rochaix
- Sergio Sister
- Malú Stewart
- Gladys Triana
