= Julia Codesido =

Peruvian painter

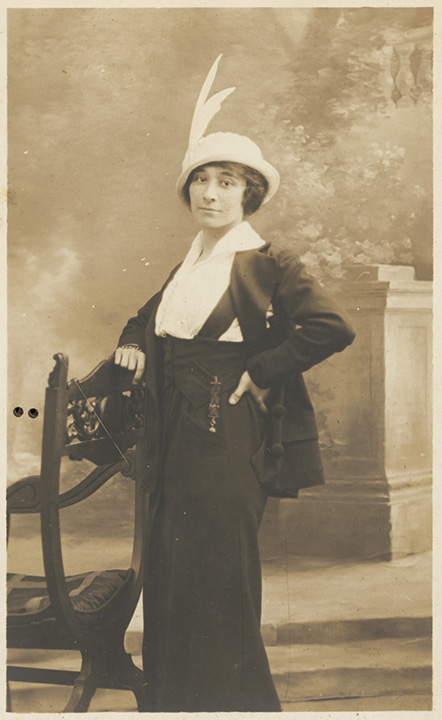
- Julia Codesido in 1913
- Born: Julia Manuela Codesido Estenós; August 5, 1883; Lima, Peru
- Died: May 7, 1979 (aged 95); Lima, Peru
- Education: National School of Fine Arts of Peru
- Occupation: Painter
- Known for: One of the first Peruvian women painters associated with the indigenist movement
- Movement: Indigenist movement
- Awards: National Culture Award (Peru) (1976)

Julia Manuela Codesido Estenós (5 August 1883, Lima – 8 May 1979, Lima) was a Peruvian painter, one of the most significant representatives of the Peruvian plastic movement, popularly known as "indigenismo".

== Life ==
Julia Codesido was born in Lima on 5 August 1883. She was a daughter of the jurist and diplomat Bernardino Codesido Oyaque and Matilde Estenós Carreño. Codesido spent her childhood accompanied by her older sister Matilde and her younger brother Bernardino José. She studied at the Colegio San Pedro, located in the center of Lima, and finished her studies in 1899.

Codesido traveled to Europe with her family at age of seventeen, where she visited Switzerland, Spain, England and France; the last two due to the appointment of her father as consul of Peru. During her stay in Europe, which coincided with the so-called "Belle Époque", Julia Codesido had her first inclinations for art. She made her first formal art practice in the workshop of Teófilo Castillo at the Quinta Heeren, where she stayed as an apprentice for three months.

By 1919 she was at the National School of Fine Arts of Peru, in Daniel Hernández's workshop, and in 1922 she requested a transfer to the workshop of José Sabogal, who had been appointed assistant professor of painting in 1920. Upon entering the National School of Fine Arts (ENBA), Julia Codesido formed a quintet with Teresa Carvallo, Elena Izcue (painting), Carmen Saco (sculpture) and Beatriz Neumann (artistic photography) who became the representatives of the artistic outbreak of the first women to join and who would be part of the nascent National School of Fine Arts (ENBA).

In the 1920s, Codesido was one of the leading representatives of indigenous painting and one of the very few women enrolled in the National Superior Autonomous School of Fine Arts of Peru.

== Art ==
After completing her studies in 1924, she held her first solo exhibition in the Alcedo National Music Academy hall in 1929. Julia Codesido was described as an artist with a "preference for the vernacular." Thus standing out because of her artistic nature and her ability to combine color and design in her expressive style. Two years later she showed her work at San Marcos University in Lima, Perú. In 1931, she was appointed professor of drawing and painting at the National School of Fine Arts of Peru after having been an assistant to Sabogal. Towards 1935, she left for Mexico, where she exhibited in the Gallery of Exhibitions of the Palace of Fine Arts, presented by David Alfaro Siqueiros.

In 1936 she had her first presentation in the United States at Alma Reed's Delphic Studios in New York City. Codesido's paintings of The Market (La Feria) and Threshing in the Andes (La trill de los andes) were part of this exhibition.

In 1943, Codesido exhibited in the Latin-American Collection at the Museum of Modern Art.

Codesido returned to Paris in 1953 where she exhibited, at the "Petit Palais", together with the Bolivian artist Marina Núñez del Prado and the Brazilian sculptor Irene Arnau. The artist also participated in numerous group and individual exhibitions. In 1959, she exhibited at the Museum of Modern Art again.

Codesido's expressionist style, her use of both color and design, along with the strong influence of Peruvian indigenous culture in her works contributed to her standing out amongst fellow artists. Her approach towards perspective as well as her strong sense of color garnered descriptions of her art from fellow artists as "decorative". Codesido's research and interest in the indigenous culture of Peru within her art took a modern approach in later years as she moved towards abstraction.

In 1946 she was appointed a member of the Peruvian Art Institute, having as its main function to form the museum collection of popular art and crafts of the now known National Museum of Peruvian Culture, founded on the initiative of Luis E. Valcárcel.

Julia Codesido dedicated many years to investigating the roots of Peruvian culture, which were nuanced with various individual and collective collections in Peru and abroad, until she died on 8 May 1979.

== Plastic work ==
The plastic work of Julia Codesido can be summarized in three stages. The first covers the years 1919 to 1924, includes academic training at the National School of Fine Arts directed by Daniel Hernández. The arrival of José Sabogal to the School of Fine Arts in 1920, influenced her style and, by 1925, the authors indicate the beginning of her second Peruvian stage called "indigenista". In this period the influence of Sabogal is undeniable both in thematic and technique.

Due to the trip she made to Mexico and where she exhibited in the Exhibition Gallery of the Palacio de Bellas Artes in 1935, her painting underwent an evolution as it received the influence of Mexican mural painting.

Julia Codesido's work stood out from the "Indigenista" group because she was an artist who transcended the trend, since her painting not only received external influence, such as Mexican or European mural painting, but she assimilated and reworked it, obtaining as a result a painting with its own characteristics. This period is known as the third stage that spans from 1945 to her last days.

== Works in public access collections (selection) ==
Lima Art Museum:

- Jungle Women, 1949. Oil on canvas. 80 x 63 cm.
- India Huanca, 1932. Oil on canvas. 120 x 95 cm.
- Portrait of José Carlos Mariátegui, 1926. Oil on canvas. 50.5 x 60.5 cm.

Centre Pompidou, Paris:

- Indias Huanca. 1931. Oil on canvas. 106 x 116 cm.

Museum of the National University of San Marcos, Lima:

- Storm, ca. 1950. Oil on canvas.
- Indian. Lithography
- Market. Lithography

== Awards and honors ==
Codesido was awarded in 1976 with the National Prize of Culture of Peru.

A crater on the planet Mercury was named in her honor in November 2024.
