= Armando Villegas =

Peruvian-born Colombian painter (1926–2013)

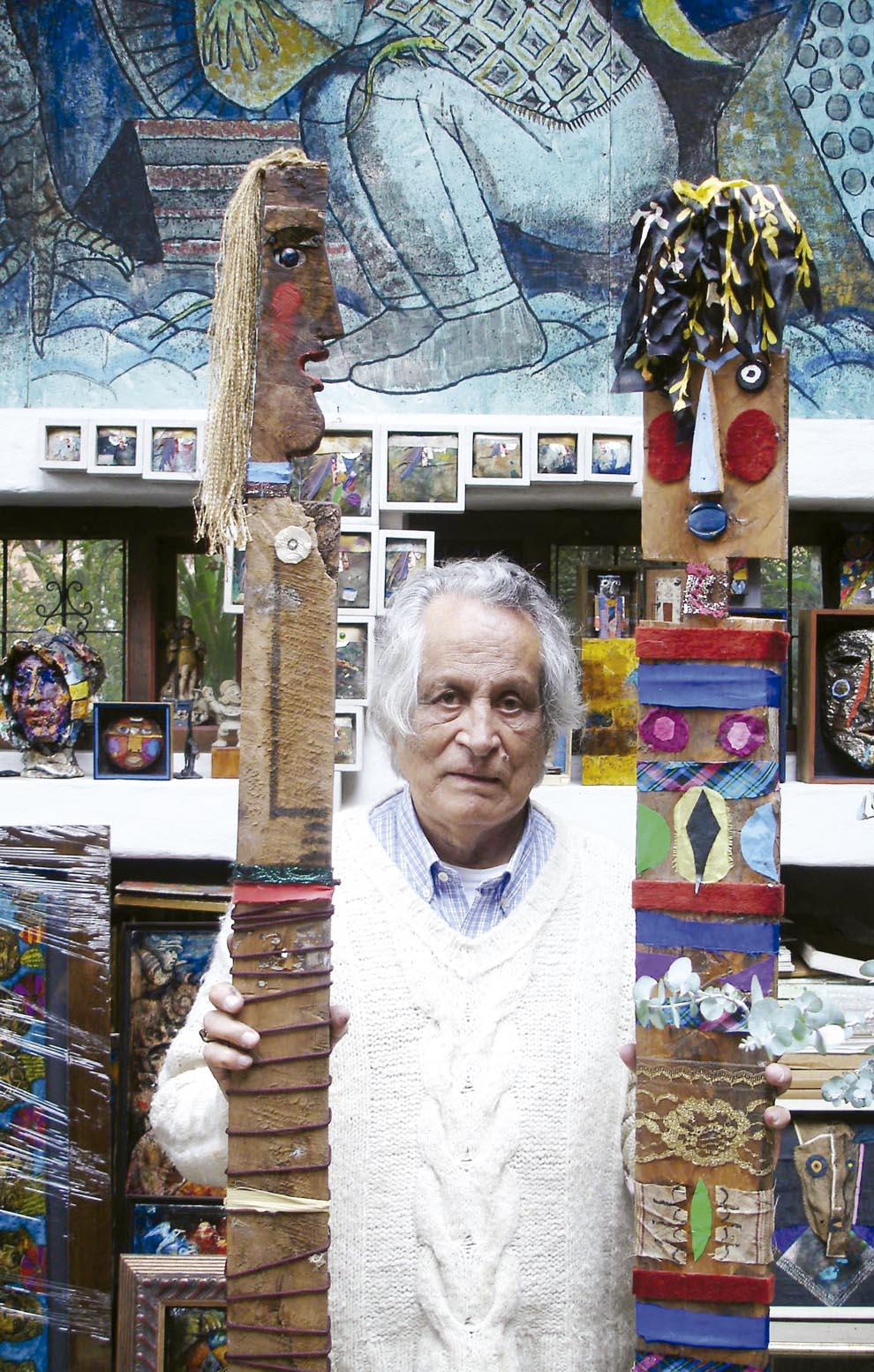
- Villegas in 2009
- Born: Armando Villegas; 1926; Pomabamba, Ancash Region, Peru
- Died: 29 December 2013 (aged 87); Bogotá, Colombia
- Education: Escuela Nacional Superior Autónoma de Bellas Artes; National University of Colombia
- Occupation: Painter
- Years active: 1954–2013
- Children: 2

Armando Villegas (1926 – 29 December 2013) was a Peruvian-born Colombian painter whose career spanned nearly six decades. He produced more than 15,000 works, notably the "guerreros" (warriors) series, and founded the Museo Bolivariano de Arte Contemporáneo in Santa Marta.

== Early life and education ==
Villegas was born in 1926 in Pomabamba, Ancash Region, Peru. He spoke Quechua from childhood and continued to speak it throughout his life. His early artistic influences included the traditional tocapus textiles woven by his aunts, featuring geometric patterns and vibrant colors from nature.

He began his artistic education at the Escuela Nacional Superior Autónoma de Bellas Artes in Lima, where he studied under Juan Manuel Ugarte Eléspuru. In 1951, Villegas received a scholarship to study muralism at the National University of Colombia's School of Fine Arts, working under Ignacio Gómez Jaramillo. He completed his master's degree at the National University of Colombia.

== Career ==
=== Early work and breakthrough (1950s–1970s) ===
Villegas joined the Bogotá gallery El Callejón, where he worked in various capacities, including as a framer and curator. The gallery showed his first solo exhibition in 1954, a selection of abstract work.

The exhibition received a highly favorable review from Gabriel García Márquez, then a young journalist for El Espectador, who wrote, "I have the satisfying impression of witnessing the beginning of an astonishing pictorial work." The review began a lifelong friendship between the two artists.

In 1955, Villegas participated in the Primera exposición colectiva de pintura abstracta (First Collective Exhibition of Abstract Painting) at the Biblioteca Nacional de Colombia, alongside Eduardo Ramírez Villamizar, Judith Márquez, Marco Ospina, and Guillermo Silva.

In 1958, Villegas's Azul violeta verde luz (Blue Violet Green Light) won second place at the XI Salón Nacional de Artistas, in the same competition where Fernando Botero took first place. It was a significant achievement for a foreign artist to present abstract work in a country that had been mainly provincial and focused on domestic themes in its academic traditions. His work was also included in critic Marta Traba's exhibition "Pintura abstracta de Colombia" (Abstract Painting of Colombia) at the Biblioteca Luis Ángel Arango.

During this period of working in abstraction, he created pieces influenced by Quechua tocapus textiles he had observed in his childhood. In 1963, critic Eugenio Barney Cabrera listed Villegas among the talented young Colombian abstract artists, alongside Ramírez Villamizar, Silva Santamaría, and Judith Márquez.

=== Figurative period and the warriors (1973–1990s) ===
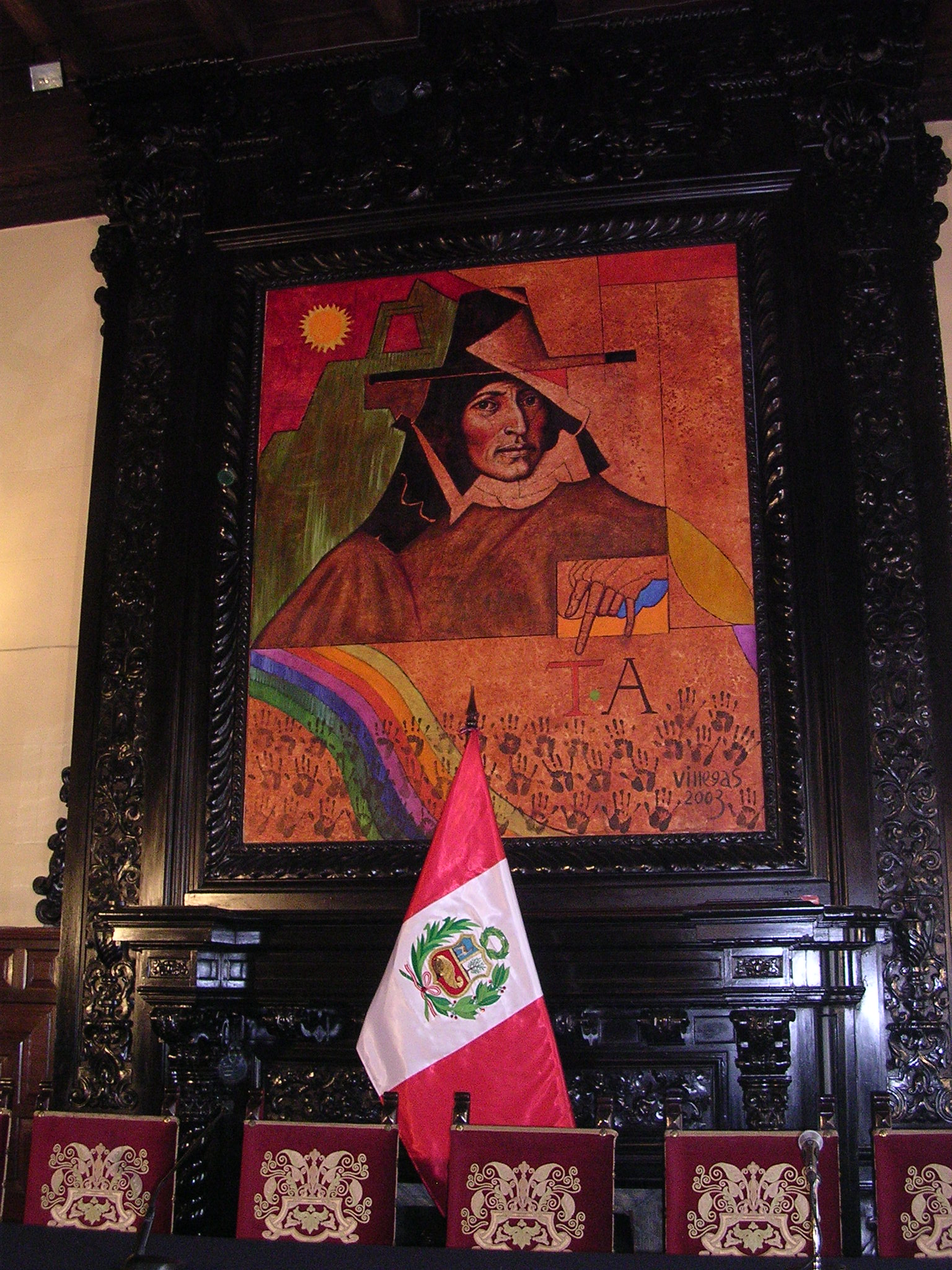
Villegas' painting of Túpac Amaru II (2003) in Peru's Presidential Palace

In 1973, Villegas visited the Dominican Republic on behalf of the United Nations to promote the arts. The Caribbean influenced his palette and led to the development of his most recognized series, the "guerreros" (warriors), a shift after two decades of abstract work.

The warrior figures stand at the center of each painting, wearing elaborate and fantastical headdresses. Villegas painted them in dark, somber tones and surrounded them with plants and animals from across the Americas. The warriors face the viewer with expressions described as alternately naive and defiant. The warrior series was partly inspired by his second wife's surname, Sonia Guerrero Dah-Dah.

=== Later work and multimedia exploration ===
Villegas later returned to abstraction and took up sculpture. He created "soft sculptures" and collages using found objects from his studio and home, including soccer balls, jewelry cases, kitchen gloves, coins, fabric coats, used shoes, and discarded materials from his students.

== Cultural contributions ==
Villegas founded the Museo Bolivariano de Arte Contemporáneo at the Quinta de San Pedro Alejandrino in Santa Marta and served as its first director.

He established the Fundación Armando Villegas to preserve his artistic legacy and convert his house into a public museum to display his works and private collection. The foundation also received a donation of pre-Columbian pieces that Villegas had collected, which the Villegas Guerrero family donated to the Instituto Colombiano de Antropología e Historia (ICANH). The foundation is currently led by his son Daniel Villegas as director and his widow Sonia Guerrero as president.

Villegas taught at the University of the Andes alongside David Manzur Londoño, training future artists including Fanny Sanín.

== Recognition and legacy ==
Villegas belonged to a notable group of Colombian artists that included Alejandro Obregón, Guillermo Wiedemann, Eduardo Ramírez Villamizar, Fernando Botero, and Enrique Grau. This group was famously captured in a photograph by Hernán Díaz. Critic Marta Traba and others at times excluded Villegas from this group, even publishing versions of this photograph altered to remove him.

In 2008, Davivienda honored Villegas as part of their annual tribute to Colombian artists.

In 2013, the year of his death, Villegas was nominated for the Prince of Asturias Awards in the arts category. He produced over 15,000 works in various formats and techniques, ranging from miniatures in oil and watercolor to murals measuring six meters in length and iron or wooden sculptures over two meters tall.

== Personal life ==
Villegas spent three-quarters of his life in Colombia, and both his wives and children from his two marriages were Colombian. Villegas became a naturalized Colombian citizen in 1993. His second wife was Sonia Guerrero Dah-Dah. He had at least one son, Daniel Villegas, who became director of the Fundación Armando Villegas.

He maintained his studio in the Usaquén neighborhood of Bogotá for the final 33 years of his life.

=== Death ===
Despite battling cancer, Villegas continued working through his later years. He died on 29 December 2013, aged 87, in Bogotá, Colombia.

== Bibliography ==
- Giraldo, Juan David, ed. (2008). Armando Villegas, homenaje (in Spanish). Bogotá: Villegas Editores. ISBN 978-958-8306-16-2.
