= Javier Cabada =

Spanish-born American painter (b. 1931)

- Born: Javier Arroyo Cabada; October 25, 1931 (age 94); Barcelona, Spain
- Education: National Superior Autonomous School of Fine Arts, Lima, Corcoran School of the Arts and Design
- Occupation: Visual artist
- Known for: painting
- Spouse: Consuelo Pilares Cabada

Javier Cabada (born October 25, 1931) is a Spanish-born American visual artist. He is known for painting colorful, abstract works. His works have been exhibited in galleries and museums such as the Royal Institute of Thailand in Bangkok, Thailand; the Tretyakov Gallery in Moscow, and the Corcoran Gallery of Art in Washington, D.C. Cabada lives in Washington, D.C.

== Background ==
Javier Cabada was born on October 25, 1931, in Barcelona, Spain.

He studied painting at the National Superior Autonomous School of Fine Arts, Lima in Lima, Peru, under Óscar Allain Cottera. He also studied at the Corcoran School of the Arts and Design, and the Ecola Massana in Barcelona.

He has lived in the United States since the early 1960s, and attained U.S. citizenship in 1976.

== Career ==
Cabada works as a painter, but has also worked as a printmaker.

He counts Richard Serra, Francis Bacon, Frank Gehry, Jean-Michel Basquiat, and Alberto Giacometti among his artistic influences, not only for their style, but also for their process and perfectionist natures. He experimented with several different styles before settling on acrylic on canvas.

His earlier work was considerably more figurative than his later abstract works and was generally cartoonish and whimsical. Many of his early subjects were flowers, dancers, and portraits of classical composers and musicians.

From 1973 to 1983, his painting of Frédéric Chopin was on exhibition in the John F. Kennedy Center for the Performing Arts in Washington D.C., and his portrait of Elvis Presley featured on the front cover of Music Educator's Journal in 1970.

In 2024, Cabada Contemporary was opened in Washington, D.C., a gallery featuring artwork by Javier and his daughter Sabrina.

== Museum collections ==
Cabada's works are in the following collections:

- Detroit Institute of Arts in Detroit, Michigan
- Museum of Art, Dayton, Ohio
- Goethe House Museum in Frankfurt, Germany
- Art Institute of Chicago in Chicago, Illinois
- Museum of Stafford, Stafford, Connecticut
- Harvard University, Cambridge, Massachusetts
- Michigan State University, East Lansing, Michigan
- University of Alabama, Birmingham, Alabama
- National Marine Museum, Quantico, Virginia
- Cafritz Art Collection, Washington, D.C.
- John F. Kennedy Center for the Performing Arts, Washington, D.C.
- Georgetown University, Washington, D.C.
- National Portrait Gallery, Washington, D.C.; two works held at the Walter Reed Army Institute of Research
- IBM Art Gallery, New York City, New York
- University of Maryland, College Park in College Park, Maryland
- Ruth and Elmer Wellin Museum of Art at Hamilton College in Clinton, New York
