= Elena Izcue =

Peruvian illustrator, graphic artist (1889–1970)

- Elena Izcue c. 1919
- Born: Elena Izcue Cobián; April 19, 1889; Lima, Peru
- Died: September 27, 1970 (aged 81); Lima, Peru
- Other names: Elena de Izcue Cobián
- Education: National Superior Autonomous School of Fine Arts, Lima, Académie de la Grande Chaumière
- Occupations: Illustrator, graphic artist, painter, educator, textile designer

Elena Izcue (née Elena Izcue Cobián; 1889–1970) was a Peruvian illustrator, graphic artist, painter, educator, and textile designer. She was known for her modern decorative art and designs that celebrated a pre-Columbian art aesthetic.

== Early life and education ==
Elena Izcue Cobián was born in 1889, in Lima, Peru; she was a twin and her sister was Victoria. Their parents were María Antolina Cobián, and José Rafael de Izcue. At a very young age, both daughters had to work, and they worked as teachers.

In 1910, Izcue was appointed professor of drawing at the School Center of Callao. In the publication La Escuela Moderna (1914), she designed the cover using pre-Columbian elements.

In 1919, she began her studies at the National Superior Autonomous School of Fine Arts, Lima. She was a student of Daniel Hernández Morillo and José Sabogal. While in school she became interested in pre-Hispanic art, and met Philip Ainsworth Means, an American anthropologist working as the director of the archaeology section of the National Museum of Peru. This connection to Means allowed her access to view the pre-Columbian pieces in the museum.

== Career ==
She published two volumes of the book, Peruvian Art in School: a Manual for Teaching Drawing in Peruvian Schools (1926 and 1929) (Spanish: El arte peruano en la escuela: un manual para la enseñar deldibujo en las escuelas peruanos), which was well received by Peruvian president Augusto B. Leguía, and Izcue was awarded a two-year pension to study in Paris. She traveled with her twin sister Victoria Izcue to Paris, where they visited various workshops to help them establish a decorative arts practice. In 1933, she continued her studies for a year at the Académie de la Grande Chaumière, and under painter Fernand Léger. The sisters traveled for a month to New York City in 1935, for an exhibition of their work shown alongside archeological works from Peru at the Fuller Building, and after they returned to Paris, where they remained until 1938 due to the looming threat of World War II. On their way home to Peru, they stopped in New York City to advise on the design the Peruvian Pavilion at the 1939 New York World's Fair.

In the summer of 1939, they arrived in Lima. By 1940 the National Workshop of Applied Graphic Arts was formed in Lima, under the direction of Elena and the administration of Victoria. She continued this teaching until 1950, after in which she dedicated the next twenty years to the creation of her own work of textile designs, paintings, and drawings.

== Death and legacy ==
She died on September 27, 1970, in Lima. Her artwork can be found in museum collections, including at the Denver Art Museum in Denver, Colorado; and the Museo de Arte de Lima in Lima, Peru.

In 2024, at the 60th Venice Biennale Izcue's artwork was posthumously shown alongside other artists from Peru, including José Sabogal, Julia Codesido, Santiago Yahuarcani (born 1960), Rember Yahuarcani (born 1985), and Violeta Quispe (born 1989).

== Publications ==
- La Escuela Moderna (in Spanish). Elena Izcue (cover artist). 1914.
- Larco Herrera, Rafael, ed. (1923). La leyenda de Manco Capac (in Spanish).
- Izcue, Elena (1926). El arte peruano en la escuela: un manual para la enseñar deldibujo en las escuelas peruanos [Peruvian Art in School: a Manual for Teaching Drawing in Peruvian Schools] (in Spanish). Vol. I. Paris: Editorial Excelsior.
- Izcue, Elena (1929). El arte peruano en la escuela: un manual para la enseñar deldibujo en las escuelas peruanos [Peruvian Art in School: a Manual for Teaching Drawing in Peruvian Schools] (in Spanish). Vol. II. Paris: Editorial Excelsior.
