= Oscar Allain =

Peruvian painter (1922–2025)

- Born: 19 September 1922; Lima, Peru
- Died: 17 December 2025 (aged 103); Lima, Peru
- Education: National Superior Autonomous School of Fine Arts
- Style: Costumbrista, neoindigenist
- Spouse: Yola Santisteban Vásquez
- Relatives: Raúl Allain (grandson)

Signature
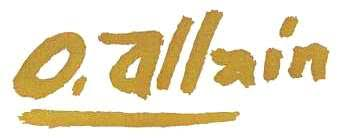

Óscar Guillermo Allain Cottera (19 September 1922 – 17 December 2025) was a Peruvian painter of French descent.

== Life and career ==
Allain was born in Lima, Peru, on 19 September 1922. He was the son of the marriage of the military man Guillermo Allain Soto and the novice Juanita Cottera Palomino. His father proposed that he study the militarization of the Chorrillos Military School. His mother died at the age of 22.

Allain studied at the National Superior Autonomous School of Fine Arts (ENSABAP) in Lima. He was a disciple of Alejandro González Trujillo ("Apu-Rimak") at the centennial National School of Fine Arts as a member of the so-called "golden generation". He worked as a professor at the Víctor Morey Peña Higher School of Fine Arts in Iquitos and at the Hermilio Valdizan National University in Huánuco.

Allain was a paradigmatic, testimonial and expressive painter of the coast, mountains and jungle of Peru. His plastic art captured the colors, faces and characters such as the painting of the artists Pancho Fierro, Francisco Laso, José Sabogal and Teodoro Núñez Ureta that expresses the man of Peru with his peculiarities.

Allaim participated in notable museums in Paris, Amsterdam, Madrid and London, observing the essential paintings. Throughout his career, he exhibited in galleries in Peru and beyond, such as the Cultural Center of San Marcos with the exhibition of the private collection of Bill and Cristina Kallop.

Allain relocated to Paris, France, for several decades. He lived in the Place de la Concorde and attended the flea market where he bought a military painting about his ancestors who were Sephardic Jews who had moved from Spain to Bordeaux, France, because of a terrorist threat. In France, Allain painted on the banks of the Seine river like the Impressionist painters, with the good fortune that the public bought his paintings as they were nearing completion. Among the various pictorial motifs we find women dressed in white represented in a watercolor entitled "Las chismosas". Allain pointed out that he liked to paint customs.

The independent painters are integrated by Ricardo Grau, Óscar Allain, Francisco González Gamarra, Sérvulo Gutiérrez, Juan Barreto, Carlos More, Domingo Pantigoso, Víctor Humareda, Carlos Quizpez Asín, Federico Reinoso, Bernardo Rivero, Ricardo Sánchez, Adolfo Winternitz and Sabino Springett, among others.

Allain formed the group 8 pintores which was made up of the painters Ángel Chávez López, Aquiles Ralli, Enrique Galdos Rivas, Fernando Sovero, Gamaniel Palomino, Julio Camino Sánchez and Manuel Zapata Orihuela.

He was a member of the Association of Plastic Artists of Peru (ASPAP), and the Society of Authors and Composers of Peru (SAYCOPE).

Allain died on 17 December 2025 at the age of 103.

== Pictorial work ==
Allain's pictorial work seeks to reinterpret the art and culture of Peru. The independent master is a creator, an integrator who assumes the diverse identities of Peru, a country of diverse nationalities since the ancestors populated this wonderful nation.

This scenario encouraged Allain's creative spirit, highlighting the mastery with which he captures the world of the common man with his land, diversity of customs and traditions in a realistic, telluric symbology, creating his canvases with the colors of the homeland, flora and the fauna of the coast, mountains and jungle of Peru. In this historical framework, we find the diversity of human beings as protagonists of their ancestral genius that they obtain from the outside world.

In his journey around the world, Allain developed his pictorial experimentation, capturing the spirit, strength and resistance of man in his daily life with the intensity of the brush that processes his expressionist proposal to discover the feelings, the soul and the bones of the common man through the unity of color, shape and movement.

Allain with the pictorial technique of "telluric expressionism" is sensitive and eloquent to observers and experts of plastic art. This pictorial technique is characterized by light, dark and chiaroscuro strokes and the subtlety of the observation of his canvases.

The writer José Antonio Bravo recognizes the value of his pictorial paintings and his transcendence in the article "Allain and everyday Peru". Characters such as the northern cholas, the fishermen, the banana vendors are part of his pictorial creation.

The painter Allain is accurate in his judgment about painting and its social role. The independent master expresses that painting is pure emotion because art does not mean portraying reality. Pictorial criticism makes his paintings recognized by the national and international public.

His long-standing pictorial work can be found in various places in Peru and the world. Master Allain has exhibited in countries such as France, Holland, Spain, England and the United States.

== Criollismo ==
The painter Óscar Allain has been artistically influenced by Teófilo Allain by the music of the "cholo" Carlos Pantoja who was also a neighbor of the Barrios Altos and the Cercado de Lima, a place where criollismo is intensely lived and the famous Amancaes fair.

Allain also worked as an announcer on Radio Delcar and on Radio Central. This locution work has created links with criollismo. Allain had as friends the criollo composers and singers Lucy Smith, Pablo Casas Padilla, Manuel Acosta Ojeda, Lorenzo Sotomayor Lishner, Luis Takahashi Nuñez, Carlos Hayre Ramírez, Alicia Maguiña Málaga, María de Jesús Vásquez Vásquez.

As a boxer, he obtained a trophy in the bantamweight category, however, the promoter Max Aguirre recommended that he not continue in the art of fists so that he could write a journalistic column in the newspaper La Crónica. The path of writing related him to writers such as Martín Adán and Juan Gonzalo Rose. The independent master is a walker who travels all over Peru.

His painting is also influenced by the world of bohemia and music. The Rímac, the Barrios Altos and La Victoria are the triangle of criollismo in Peru. Óscar Allain was influenced by this source and painted much of that history of singers, dancers and marinera dancers. Allain is the artist who bears witness to his time with his own style.

== Awards and distinctions ==
Among the awards and distinctions he has received we can find the following:

- "World Award for Artistic Excellence" from the Hispanomundial Union of Writers.
- Grace Pension of the Peruvian State.
- Civic Medal of the Municipality of La Victoria.
- Civic Medal of the Municipality of Jesús María.
- Civic Medal of the Municipality of San Isidro.
- Civic Medal of the Municipality of Lima.
- Civic Medal of the Peruvian Petroleum Engineering Service of the East (SEPIPSA).
- Civic Medal of the National Association of Breeders and Owners of Peruvian Paso Horses (ANCPCPP).
- Medal of Culture of the National Institute of Culture of Lambayeque.
- Medal of the National Society of Fine Arts of Peru.
- Artistic Palmas in the Degree of Grand Master of the Ministry of Education.
- Retrospective of Óscar Allain from the Pancho Fierro Municipal Art Gallery.
- Participation in the edition of the pictorial exhibition "Art Night".
- Participation in the Fourth Havana Biennial, Cuba.
- Exhibition of the Museum of the Americas of Puerto Rico.
- Exhibition "The Color of my Land" of the 465th anniversary of the National University of San Marcos.
- Pictorial exhibition at the Convention of Peruvian Institutions of the United States and Canada in New York City.
- Collective exhibition "Between the figurative and the abstract" of the Ministry of Culture.
- Collective exhibition of the artists of the Association of Plastic Artists of Peru (ASPAP) of the Ricardo Palma Cultural Center.
- Collective exhibition "Marinera for the world" of the gallery "Raúl Joo Meléndez" of the College of Architects of La Libertad.
- Collective tribute exhibition of the Association of Plastic Artists of Peru and Petroleum of Peru.
- Participation in the Congress of the Marinera of the House of Latin America.
- Participation in the educational strategy "I learn at home" of the Ministry of Education.
- Participation in the XVI General Assembly and Congress of the International Association of Plastic Arts of the United Nations Educational, Scientific and Cultural Organization (AIAP-UNESCO).
- Representation of Peru in the Family Integration event of the Organization of American States (OAS).
- Issuance of stamps of the Postal Services of Peru (Serpost) with motifs of Allain's pictorial work.
- In the celebration of his first centenary of his birth, he was considered the dean of painters and patriarch of the Creoles of Peru.
- Waltz song in his tribute entitled "Painter of sensations" composed and recorded by the criollos Willy Terry and Carlos Castillo.

== Bibliography ==
- Espinoza Sánchez, Jorge (2009). Peruanos ilustres del siglo XX. Urrutia Editores.
- Lavarello Vargas de Velaochaga, Gabriela (2009). Artistas Plásticos en el Perú. Siglos XVI-XVII-XVIII-XIX-XX. G. Lavarello Vargas de Velaochaga.
- Tello Garust, Guillermo (1997). Pinturas y Pintores del Perú. Talleres Gráficos C&C.
- Huerto Wong, José (2000). Huellas de Bellas Artes: Reseña histórica de 1917-1999 de la docencia, la plástica y la vida institucional en la Escuela Nacional Superior Autónoma de Bellas Artes del Perú (ENSABAP). Análisis y Conclusiones: Ensayo Pedogógico. Editora Magisterial.
- Pinacoteca Del Banco Central De Reserva Del Perú. Museum of the Central Reserve Bank of Peru. 1997.
- Ugarte Eléspuru, Juan Manuel (1970). "Pintura y escultura en el Perú contemporáneo". Ediciones de Difusión del Arte Peruano.
- "Óscar Allain: El incansable pintor de sensaciones". Centro de Estudios Literarios Antonio Cornejo Polar. 1996.
- "Cuarenta años pintando ha cumplido Óscar Allain". Centro de Estudios Literarios Antonio Cornejo Polar. 1986.
- Quijada Macha, Eloísa María (1991). "Óscar Allain: pintura y otras claridades". Centro de Estudios Literarios Antonio Cornejo Polar.
- Chiri Jaime, Alberto Sandro (2000). "Quiero pintar lo que me dé la gana: Entrevista con Óscar Allain". Centro de Estudios Literarios Antonio Cornejo Polar.
