= Raúl Allain =

Peruvian writer, poet, editor and sociologist

- Born: Raúl Alfonso Allain Vega; 11 November 1989 (age 36); Lima, Peru
- Education: National University of San Marcos
- Occupations: Writer; sociologist; political analyst; international consultant; columnist

Raúl Alfonso Allain Vega (born 11 November 1989) is a Peruvian writer, poet, editor and sociologist.

== Life ==
Allain is the son of Manuel Alfonso Allain Santisteban and Patricia María del Pilar Vega González and grandson of Óscar Allain Cottera, an artist. In 2007, Allain entered the National University of San Marcos to study sociology. He has a degree in sociology.

== Career ==
Allain is the author of La cientificidad del consciente: Conjeturas (2011) and various texts that have been published in Latin American media. His texts have been published in the anthologies Abofeteando a un cadáver (2007), Poesía y narrativa hispanoamericana actual (2010), Lima: visiones desde el dibujo y la poesía (2010), Veinte poetas: muestra de poesía contemporánea (2010), El Papa Francisco en el Perú / Versos y prosa (2018) and Antología de poetas críticos (2019), among others.

As an editor, Allain has published anthologies on poetics, visual arts, and journalism Poéticas: selección de artes poéticas por poetas peruanos contemporáneos (2010), Suicidas Sub 21 (2010), Convergencias: muestra de poesía contemporánea (2011), Poiesis hispanoamericana: selección de poesía contemporánea (2012), Eros & Tánatos: poesía y arte contemporáneos (2012), Suicidas del 89 (2013), ¡Yo no hice nada!: sobre la idiosincrasia peruana (2013), ¡Palaciego In Memoriam!: selección de textos de Humberto Pinedo (2018), Poiesis Hispanoamericana: segunda edición (2023), among others.

The anthologies Suicidas Sub 21, Convergencias: muestra de poesía contemporánea y Poiesis hispanoamericana: selección de poesía contemporánea are registered in the Mario Vargas Llosa Library of the House of Peruvian Literature.

Suicidas Sub 21, a literary group that Allain created during university, brought together authors and poets, that were students from various universities. Among the authors who wrote for the group were Laura Rosales, Alejandro Mautino Guillén, Indira Anampa and Esteban Poole.

The House of the Peruvian Poet, chaired by José Guillermo Vargas published the number RAÚL: El oficio sociológico en la poesía of the magazine La Casita Estrecha which includes his most recent literary production and takes stock of his poetic work.

Estudió en la Universidad Nacional Mayor de San Marcos. Sociólogo de profesión y poeta de nacimiento. Por esa línea encontramos a su abuelo, el extraordinario poeta del color Óscar Allain, de quien hereda el talento y la sencillez. Llama la atención que un joven poeta haya adquirido un lenguaje propio, con maniobra horizontal y vertical de rupturas, tratando de examinar las circunstancias y la sensibilidad de los sentidos frente a la naturaleza. De esa observación desarrolla su discurso lírico. Sociólogo él, observa el mundo y sus circunstancias, proclamando los desafueros y abusos de una sociedad pervertida que no puede ordenarse o humanizarse. Su oficio sociológico, hace un maridaje lírico con la poesía, bañándonos en un lenguaje propio y cuidadoso, cuando lo amerita, o desaforado cuando se trata de la denuncia. Usando su propio lenguaje: "gusto escribir sobre la teoría social, pero en verso; por tanto, la influencia del electromagnetismo sobre la vida cotidiana del hombre". Todo esto, le constituye su "Razón universal", por lo que -cuando escribe- apela a la poesía de la razón, propiciando el mundo de la ruptura. Siendo esto así, estamos de su lado, por cuanto nos responde a la pregunta: ¿Para qué sirve el arte? ¿Para qué sirven los poetas? Y lo más terrible: ¿Para qué servimos? Salud.

— José Guillermo Vargas, "RAÚL: El oficio sociológico en la poesía"

In March 2011, his article "¿Por qué no votar por la salud pública?" was published in the magazine Ágora: papeles de arte gramático.

In December 2012, he was considered a young author by the magazine Monolito.

In December 2013, the proclamation of the scientific variables it raises is seen in the article "La educación peruana: una gran estafa" by the historian, poet and journalist Humberto Pinedo.

In March 2014, Humberto Pinedo wrote about Allain's aspiration for the Nobel Prize in the article "¡La aurora boreal de Moreno Ravelo!".

In May 2014, his article "El racismo en el Perú – El cholo que cholea al 'cholo'" was published, which has been a reference for the master's thesis in social anthropology "Los usos de la 'coca': jóvenes, movilidad y universidad en el nordeste argentino" of the National University of Misiones and reference for the Endophobia page.

In November 2016, 'Análisis de Humberto Pinedo sobre la obra reciente de Raúl Allain' is published.

In May 2017, her article "Maquinaciones electromagnéticas: Violación de los derechos humanos y la esfera privada" was published, which has been used as a support and reference document by the Association of Victims of Organized Harassment and Electronic Torture (VIACTEC).

In December 2019, he participates in the working groups of the XXXII Congress of the Latin American Sociological Association (ALAS), "Towards a new horizon of historical meaning of a civilization of life", which took place in Lima, Peru.

In May 2021, he participates in the preparation of the dossier "Perú: un sueño postergado", published by the Latin American Information Agency (ALAI).

In June 2021, his article “Femicide and criminal policy” is published, translated by the Pressenza International Press Agency in the organization The Good Men Project. In February 2022, "Emotional Education: An Anthropological Approach" is also published. In May 2022, "Investigating Is the Essence of Journalism" is published. And in November 2022, "Humanising Work in the Age of 'Digital Slavery'".

In July 2021, his article "Corrupción y salud mental en América Latina" was published, citing the research "El experimento de Daniel Alcides Carrión" from the Dos de Mayo National Hospital and explaining the power of corruption expressed in mental health in Latin America and the Caribbean.

In August 2021, his article "En denuncia del servilismo tecnológico" was published, which cites the Criminal Code of the country of Haiti and makes a social denunciation of torture and other cruel, inhuman or degrading treatment or punishment through the concept of mind control.

In September 2021, his article "La operación política de Perú Libre" is published, citing the press release "Rechazamos el Decreto Supremo 015" of the human rights non-governmental organization (NGO) Waynakuna Perú, explaining the organization's corruption ruler Perú Libre (PL) and has been a reference for the Waynakuna Peru page.

In March 2023, his article "La (de)construcción del Perú" was published, citing the dossier "De la tensión al paroxismo" of the Red Digital newspaper, which reported on the critical presidential elections that the rural teacher and professor Pedro Castillo would win as symbolic and unprecedented image in the Bicentennial of the Independence of Peru.

In April 2023, his article "Perú, país pionero en América Latina" was published, explaining Peru's participation as a pioneer country in the Global Alliance to Eradicate Forced Labor, Modern Slavery, Human Trafficking and Child Labor -Alliance 8.7- and cites the pioneering research "El experimento de Daniel Alcides Carrión" from Peru.

In July 2023, his article "Una mirada a la Lima prehispánica: su historia, problemática y retos" was published at the Peruvian Books Cultural Center.

He has been a columnist for magazines such as Voltaire Network. He is a columnist for the newspaper Expreso, the newspaper La Industria, the newspaper El Mercurio, the magazine Biografia, the magazine Lima Gris, the magazine La Onda digital and Ssociólogos, a Spanish news outlet and sociology. His articles published in his column Maquinaciones are taken by various means.

== Awards and honors ==
In July 2019, Allain was awarded the "World Award for Cultural Excellence" from the Hispanomundial Union of Writers, chaired by Carlos Hugo Garrido Chalén. He subsequently received the "World Award for Sociological Excellence 'El Águila Internacional'". In December 2020 he was awarded the "World Award for Journalistic Excellence 'César Vallejo'". In June 2021 he was awarded the "World Award for Excellence in the Defense of Human Rights 'El Águila de Oro'". In June 2022 he was awarded the "World Award for Excellence in the Defense of Peace with Social Justice 'César Vallejo'". In May 2023 he was awarded the "World Award for Journalistic Excellence 'César Vallejo'".

In November 2021, Allain was included among the collaborators of the Anniversary of the newspaper El Mercurio Digital.

Allain currently directs the publishers, Río Negro.

International Consultant for the Association of Victims of Organized Harassment and Electronic Torture (VIACTEC).

== Bibliography ==
=== Article ===
- Hacia un Derecho Humano Público frente a la esclavitud digital, Diario Expreso. Peru, 2018 (Towards a Public Human Right against digital slavery)
- Salud mental e inclusión social, Diario Expreso. Peru, 2019 (Mental health and social inclusion)
- ¿El Perú es un narcoestado?, Diario Expreso. Peru, 2019 (Is Peru a narco-state?)
- Multilingüismo y pluriculturalidad en el Perú, Diario Expreso. Peru, 2019 (Multilingualism and multiculturalism in Peru)
- La corrupción bajo el manto del escándalo, Diario Expreso. Peru, 2020 (Corruption under the cloak of scandal)
- El racismo en el Perú – El cholo que cholea al «cholo», Ssociólogos. Spain, 2014 (Racism in Peru - The cholo who choles the «cholo»)
- Maquinaciones electromagnéticas: Violación de los derechos humanos y la esfera privada, Ssociólogos. Spain, 2017 (Electromagnetic machinations: Violation of human rights and the private sphere)
- Populismo y manipulación social, Ssociólogos. Spain, 2020 (Populism and social manipulation)
- Hacia una sociología de Lima, Ssociólogos. Spain, 2020 (Towards a sociology of Lima)
- Caso Solsiret: la violencia no tiene género, Ssociólogos. Spain, 2020 (Solsiret case: violence has no gender)
- Crisis política en el Perú, Lima Gris. Peru, 2020 (Political crisis in Peru)
- La economía a prueba de la pandemia del Covid-19, Lima Gris. Peru, 2020 (The economy tested by the Covid-19 pandemic)
- El costo social de la corrupción, Lima Gris. Peru, 2021 (The social cost of corruption)
- Perú elimina la inmunidad parlamentaria, Lima Gris. Peru, 2021 (Peru removes parliamentary immunity)
- Vacunagate: la nueva «crisis moral» del Perú, Lima Gris. Peru, 2021 (Vacunagate: Peru's new «moral crisis»)

=== Anthology ===
- Abofeteando a un cadáver, Bizarro Ediciones - Centro Cultural de España. Peru, 2007 (Slapping a corpse)
- Poesía y Narrativa Hispanoamericana Actual, Vision Libros - Lord Byron Ediciones. Spain, 2010 (Current Hispano-American Poetry and Narrative)
- Lima: visiones desde el dibujo y la poesía, Iván Fernández-Dávila. Editor. Peru, 2010 (Lima: visions from drawing and poetry)
- Veinte poetas: muestra de poesía contemporánea, I.F-D. Editor. Peru, 2010 (Twenty Poets: Contemporary Poetry Sample)
- Catástasis 2011, Ediciones OREM. Peru, 2011 (Catastasis 2011)
- Antología Décimo Aniversario de Lord Byron Ediciones, Liber Factory - Lord Byron Ediciones. Spain, 2013 (Tenth Anniversary Anthology of Lord Byron Editions)
- Mixtura Poética, Amantes del País Ediciones - Gaviota Azul Editores. Peru, 2013 (Poetic Mixture)
- Bienagradecido, Amantes del País Ediciones - Gaviota Azul Editores. Peru, 2017 (Grateful)
- El Papa Francisco en el Perú / Versos y prosa, Amantes del País Ediciones. Peru, 2018 (Pope Francis in Peru / Verses and prose)
- Antología de poetas críticos, Cisnegro. Mexico, 2019 (Critical Poets Anthology)

=== Anthology editor ===
- Poéticas: selección de artes poéticas por poetas peruanos contemporáneos (poetry), Raúl Allaín. Editor. Peru, 2010 (Poetics: selection of poetic arts by contemporary Peruvian poets)
- Suicidas Sub 21 (poetry), Raúl Allain / Iván Fernández-Dávila. Editores. Peru, 2010 (Suicides Sub 21)
- Convergencias: muestra de poesía contemporánea (poetry), Editorial Río Negro. Peru, 2012 (Convergences: contemporary poetry show)
- Poiesis Hispanoamericana: selección de poesía contemporánea (poetry), Editorial Río Negro. Peru, 2012 (Poiesis Hispanoamericana: selection of contemporary poetry)
- Eros & Tánatos: poesía y arte contemporáneos (poetry and plastic), Editorial Río Negro. Peru, 2012 (Eros & Tánatos: contemporary poetry and art)
- Suicidas del 89 (poetry), Editorial Lucífuga. Peru, 2013 (Suicides of '89)
- Versolibrismo: poesía y arte contemporáneos (poetry and plastic), Editorial Río Negro. Peru, 2013 (Versesolibrismo: contemporary poetry and art)
- ¡Yo no hice nada!: sobre la idiosincrasia peruana (essays), Amantes del País Ediciones. Peru, 2013 (I didn't do anything !: about the Peruvian idiosyncrasy)
- ¡Palaciego In Memoriam!: selección de textos de Humberto Pinedo (journalism), JustFiction Edition. Latvia, 2018 (¡Palaciego In Memoriam!: a selection of texts by Humberto Pinedo)
- "Poiesis Hispanoamericana: segunda edición". (poetry). Latvia: JustFiction Edition. 2023. ISBN 978-620-6-74100-8. (Poiesis Hispanoamericana: second edition)

=== Essay ===
- La cientificidad del consciente: Conjeturas, Editorial Emooby. Portugal, 2011 (The Scientificity of the Conscious: Conjectures)
