= Teófilo Castillo =

Peruvian painter (1857–1922)

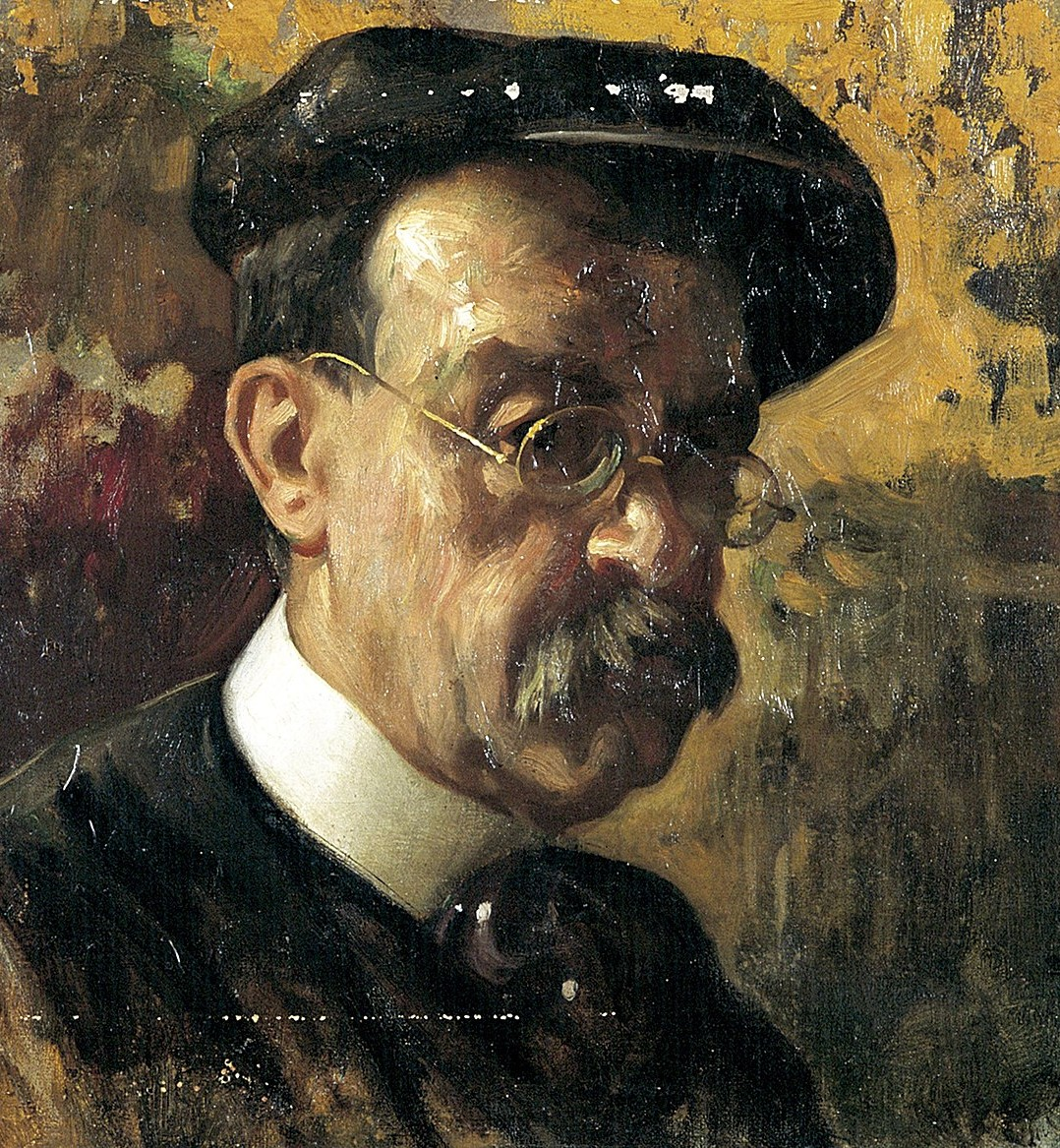
- Self-portrait (c.1910)
- Born: Teófilo Castillo Guas; 2 October 1857; Carhuaz, Peru
- Died: 7 December 1922 (aged 65); San Miguel de Tucumán, Argentina
- Education: Seminario de Lima,
- Occupations: Impressionist painter, art critic, photographer
- Spouse: María Gregoria Gaubeka
- Children: 8, including Carlos Aitor Castillo

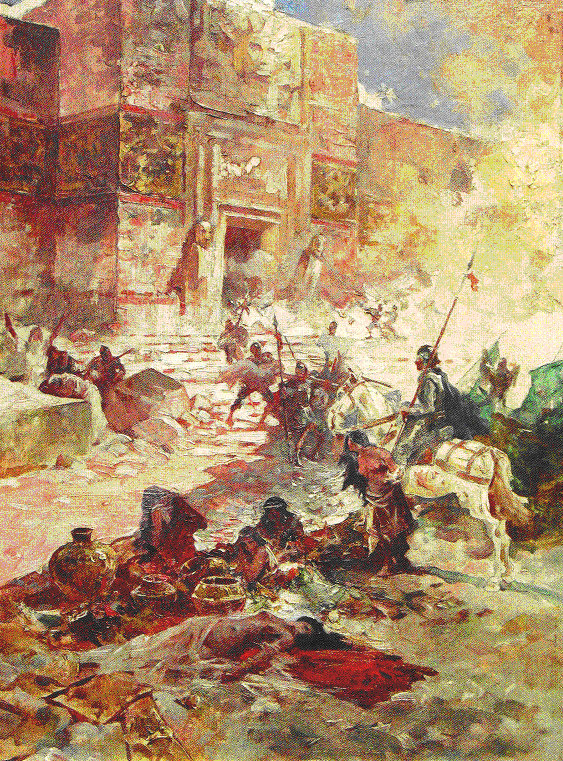
The Sacking of Qurikancha

Teófilo Castillo Guas or Guash (2 October 1857, Carhuaz – 7 December 1922, Tucumán) was a Peruvian Impressionist painter, art critic and photographer.

== Early life and education ==
Teófilo Castillo Guas, or Guash, was born on 2 October 1857, in Carhuaz in the Ancash Region, Peru.

He studied at the Seminario de Lima, then continued his studies in Spain and France. Upon returning to Peru, he held an exhibition of his works that were inspired by the Peruvian Traditions of Ricardo Palma.

== Career ==
In 1888, he moved to Buenos Aires, where he was married and worked as a photographer in addition to painting. He went back to Lima in 1906 and opened his own studio.

Two years later, he briefly revisited Spain, then worked as an art critic and portrait painter. He also became artistic director for the magazines Prisma, La Ilustración Peruana and Variedades, where he published color reproductions of his major works.

He was an enthusiastic promoter for the establishment of the Escuela Nacional Superior Autónoma de Bellas Artes (now National Superior Autonomous School of Fine Arts, Lima), and he recommended Daniel Hernández Morillo as the most qualified person to become the school's first Director. Hernández received the position, but Castillo was not even invited to join the staff. Disappointed and disillusioned, he left Peru for good in 1920.

He settled in Tucumán, where he became editor of the magazine Sol y Nieve. He also produced a huge canvas depicting General Manuel Belgrano presenting the Flag of Argentina to the Congress of Tucumán in 1816, which was purchased by the Argentine government for 20,000 Pesos. Shortly after, he was named an honorary Professor at the local art academy.

His son, Carlos Aitor Castillo (1913–2000), also became a well-known painter.
