= Fanny Sanín =

Colombian born artist from Bogotá (born 1938)

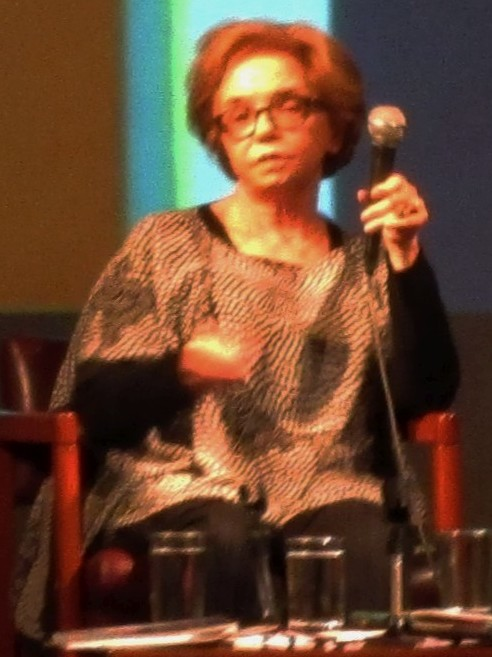
- Born: 1938 (age 87–88); Bogota, Colombia
- Education: University of Los Andes; University of Illinois; Chelsea School of Art
- Known for: Painting
- Movement: Geometric abstraction
- Website: fannysanin.com

Fanny Sanín Sader (born 1938) is a Colombian-born artist from Bogotá who resides in New York City. The daughter of Gabriel Sanín Tobón and Fanny Sader Guerra, she is best known for her paintings of abstract geometric forms and colors. She is considered to be part of the second generation of abstract artists from Colombia.

She was awarded an Honoris Causa de Magíster en Artes (honorary master's degree of art) by University of Antioquia in February, 2015.

Her work has been featured in a volume entitled, Fanny Sanín: The Concrete Language of Color and Structure, which appeared in 2019.

== Education and training ==
She graduated with a Master of Fine Arts from the University of Los Andes in 1960, studying under David Manzur Londoño and Armando Villegas. She continued her studies in the areas of printmaking and art history at the University of Illinois. While living in London in the late 1960s, she studied engraving at the Chelsea School of Art.

== Work ==
Sanín has cited a number of specific influences, including Ellsworth Kelly, Wassily Kandinsky, and Henri Matisse. Her work is often compared to that of Carmen Herrera and Lygia Clark.

Sanín's work is in several public collections, including the Allen Memorial Art Museum in Oberlin, Ohio, where Sanín donated a painting in 2017. Acrylic No. 1, 2005 was donated by the artist in honor of the scholarly work of Edward J. Sullivan, Helen Gould Sheppard professor of Fine Arts at New York University. Additionally, the museum acquired three studies for this painting: Study for Painting No. 1 (3) 2005, Study for Painting No. 1 (5) 2005, and Study for Painting No. 1 (7) 2005.

== Exhibitions and collections ==
In 1993 her painting Acrylic No. 6 was added to the permanent collection of the Art Museum of the Americas. Some of her other works have been added to the permanent collections of the Museo de Arte Abstracto Manuel Felguérez, National Museum of Women in the Arts, the Smithsonian American Art Museum, and the Museo Nacional de Colombia.

Among the temporary exhibits in which she has participated are the Pinta Art Show (2007) and the Durban Segnini Gallery's Abstracción y Constructivismo: Continuidad y ruptura de la modernidad Latinoamericana (2015).

From July 14 to October 29, 2017, the National Museum of Women in the Arts exhibited Equilibrium: Fanny Sanín that examined “her methodical process through a selection of some the artist’s earliest abstract expressionist works as well as two complete series of preliminary drawings and their attendant, finished geometric compositions.”

In 2023 her work was included in the exhibition Action, Gesture, Paint: Women Artists and Global Abstraction 1940-1970 at the Whitechapel Gallery in London.

In Summer 2025 her work was featured the Americas Society featured her work in Fanny Sanín: Geometric Equations; the exhibition was accompanied by catalog of the same name (ISBN 978-1879128613).
