= David Manzur =

Colombian painter (born 1929)

David Manzur Londoño (born December 14, 1929) is a Colombian painter, two time Guggenheim Fellowship winner and alumni of the Art Students League and Pratt Institute of New York. His subjects include still lifes, mounted knights, and saints. In 2019 Manzur was awarded the Grand Cross of the Order of Boyacá, Colombia´s highest peacetime decoration. In the year 2020 king Felipe VI bestowed upon him the Order of Isabella the Catholic as a recognition for his work and his ties with Spain.

== Early life and education ==
Manzur was born in Neira, Caldas, Colombia. His father, Salomón Manzur, was a Lebanese businessman; his mother, Cecilia Londoño Botero, was Colombian. He spent his childhood and adolescence in Bata, Equatorial Guinea, in the Canary Islands, and in Seville, living through the Spanish Civil War and World War II in Africa and Europe. After returning to Colombia in 1947, he settled in Bogotá, where he began to study art, music, and acting. He had a brief theatrical career. He studied art at the School of Fine Arts in Bogotá and at the Art Students League and Pratt Institute in New York, and received two consecutive Guggenheim Fellowship and a fellowship from the Organization of American States.

While in the United States, he was assistant to Naum Gabo, the Russian Constructivist sculptor and pioneer of Kineticism.

== Career ==
On returning to Colombia he founded an art workshop that was in existence for more than 20 years and trained many artists. He had his first solo exhibition at the Colombian National Museum when he was 24, featuring figurative works. During the 1960s and 1970s, Constructivism was an important part of his work, and he produced mostly abstract works and experimented with materials such as wood, thread, and wire.

Influenced by Spanish Baroque art, in particular by painters such as Velázquez, Zurbarán, and Sanchez Cotán, and using elements drawn from the 19th-century American realists William Harnett and John F. Peto, Manzur returned to figurative art, painting still lifes, the ecstasy of St. Teresa, the story of St. Sebastian, and especially horses in various situations.

In recent years Manzur has turned to new subjects. The Ciudades Oxidadas (rusted cities) which he exhibited in the first decade of the 21st century, which showed his special interest in the deterioration of the planet and was the result of extensive travel and research.

Manzur was also an educator who taught at the University of the Andes alongside Armando Villegas, training such future artists as Fanny Sanín.

Manzur's exhibition to mark his 90th birthday was called "El Oficio de la Pintura" at the Bogotá Museum of Modern Art and curated by Eugenio Viola. It showcased works of each one of the seven decades of Manzur´s work, it was received with critical and public acclaim.

He showcased his latest works at the International Art Fair of Bogotá ARTBO. The fair paid homage to his life and work on its 20th edition.

== Awards ==
- 1961: Guggenheim Fellowship, Guggenheim Foundation
- 1962: Guggenheim Fellowship, Guggenheim Foundation
- 1964: Pratt Institute scholarship, Organization of American States
- Prize, 1st INTERCOL salon for young artists, Bogotá Museum of Modern Art
- 1970: First Prize, Government of Antioquia, 2nd COLTEJER Biennial, Medellín
- 2005: Order of the Congress of the Republic of Colombia
- 2019: Order of Boyacá. The Grand Cross.
- 2020: Order of Isabella the Catholic.
