= Francisco González Gamarra =

Francisco González Gamarra (June 4, 1890, Cusco, Peru – July 15, 1972 Lima, Peru) was a Peruvian composer, painter, and academic administrator. As a composer he began his career writing music in styles of the Classical and Romantic periods, but later developed a highly original style which blended Western European classical music with the traditional music of Peru. His Suite for orchestra won him the "Premio Nacional de Música 'Dunker-Lavalle'" award.

He was director of the National Superior Autonomous School of Fine Arts, Lima (Spanish: Escuela Nacional Superior Autónoma de Bellas Artes del Perú) from 1949 to 1950.
