= María Wiesse =

Peruvian poet, writer, essayist and anthologist

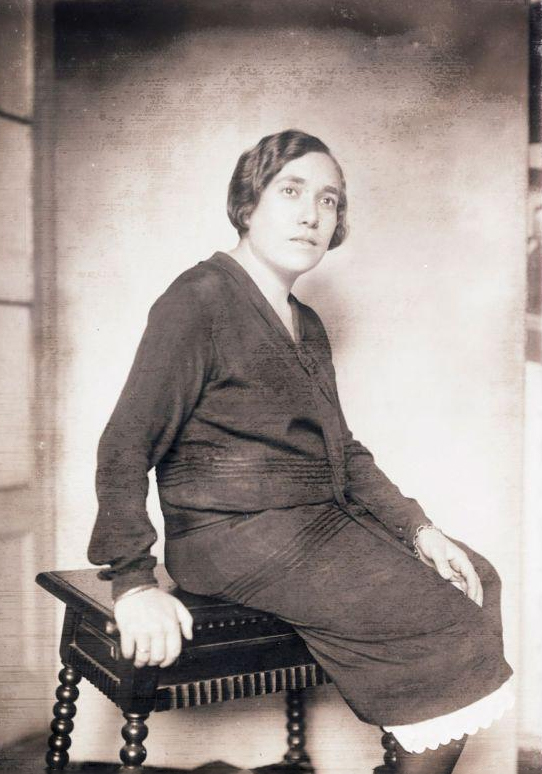
- María Wiesse in the 1920s
- Born: María Jesús Isabel Wiesse Romero; November 19, 1890; Lima, Peru
- Died: July 29, 1964 (aged 73); Lima, Peru
- Occupations: Writer, journalist, essayist, film critic
- Known for: Early Peruvian woman writer and cultural critic; pioneer in film criticism
- Notable work: Nieve y cenizas, Cuentos del mar y de la tierra, Eva
- Movement: Feminism, Vanguard literature
- Spouse: José Sabogal (m. 1922)

María Jesús Isabel Wiesse Romero (19 November 1890 in Lima – 29 July 1964 in Lima) was a Peruvian poet, writer, essayist, anthologist, and film critic.

== Early life and education ==
María Wiesse was born on 19 November 1894 in Lima. Her parents were Teresa Romero Paz and Carlos Wiesse Portocarrero, a historian and a professor at the Universidad Nacional Mayor de San Marcos. Wiesse spent her childhood in Lausanne, Switzerland and later in London, where her father worked as a lawyer for the Peruvian Corporation. In 1902 she returned to Peru at the age of eight, and concluded her studies with the French nuns of the Colegio Sagrados Corazones Belén.

== Career ==
In 1916, Wiesse started her journalistic career with cultural notes in the newspapers La Crónica, El Perú and El Día. Later she collaborated with the newspapers La Prensa and El Tiempo. In 1918, Wiesse published two comedies: "The older sister" (comedy in one act and three pictures); and "The modistón".

Around 1923 Wiesse founded the National Council of Women of Peru. Between 1923 and 1926, Wiesse traveled constantly outside Peru, she is even a source of study of the work of her husband’s travel book that he wrote about the visit that both made to Mexico, with annotations of the cultural life and the rapprochement to the social environment of that country.

In 1924-1926, Wiesse published three volumes of poetry and poetry prose entitled Motivos lricos, Nocturnos and Glosas franciscanas. Between 1926 and 1930, she published as series of articles in the magazine Amauta, founded and directed by José Carlos Mariátegui. Amauta magazine was focused on the influence of cinema on the social and cultural environment of Lima, and Wiesse published there her reviews on films and music, as well as other related articles. She also tended to write on contemporary politics, art, and everyday life.

Apart from producing her own publications, Wiesse was a regular contributor to several magazines such as Variedades, Mundial, Social, Hora del Hombre, Messenger in agriculture, Almanaque Agropecuario del Perú, and in newspapers such as La Crónica. Wiesse also wrote biographies on Santa Rosa de Lima, on Sabogal, her husband, and on her friend José Carlos Mariátegui. She published several books of stories, including Nocturnos (1925) and Nueve relatos (1954), as well as the novels La huachafita (1927), Diario sin dates (1948) and Tríptico (1953).

Wiesse directed a magazine Familia aimed at Lima's women of the middle and upper classes, where she focused on literary and musical themes to this determined reading public. She had a music program on Radio Nacional.

María Wiesse died on 29 July 1964 in Lima.

== Personal life ==
In 1922, she married the painter José Sabogal (1888-1956), with whom she had two children: José Rodolfo Sabogal Wiesse (1923-1983) and Rosa Teresa Sabogal Wiesse (1925-1985).

== Published works ==
=== Travel diary ===
- Croquis de viaje, (Lima, 1923)

=== Poetry ===
- Motivos líricos (con maderas originales de José Sabogal), (1924)
- Nocturnos, (Lima, 1925)
- Glosas franciscanas (con maderas originales de José Sabogal), (Lima, 1926)
- Trébol de cuatro hojas, (Lima, 1932)
- Canciones, Lima, Imprenta Lux, mayo de 1934;
- Estancias, Lima, 1945;
- Rosa de los vientos, Lima, 1949;
- Jabirú (diversiones al margen de la poesía), (Lima, 1951)

=== Novels ===
- La huachafita (ensayo de novela limeña), (Lima, 1927)
- Rosario (historia de una niña), (Lima, 1929)
- Diario sin fechas (novela), (Lima, 1948)
- Tríptico, (Lima, 1953)

=== Stories ===
- Nueve relatos (con maderas de José Sabogal), (Lima, 1933)
- Quipus, (relatos peruanos para niños), (Lima, 1936)
- Aves nocturnas, (Lima, 1941)
- El mar y los piratas, (Lima, 1947)
- La flauta de Marsías (leyendas de la música), (Lima, 1950)
- Pequeñas historias, (Lima, 1951)
- Linterna mágica, (1954)
- La torre bermeja, (1955)
- El pez de oro y otras historietas absurdas, (Lima, 1958)

=== Theater ===
- La hermana mayor (comedia en un acto y tres cuadros); El modistón (entremés), (Lima, 1918)

=== Biographies ===
- Santa Rosa de Lima, Lima, Casa Editorial F. y E. Rosay, 1922.
- José María Córdova (1799-1829, ensayo biográfico). Lima, Tip. de la "Voce d'Italia", 1924.
- La romántica vida de Mariano Melgar (con maderas de José Sabogal). Lima, Club del Libro Peruano, 1939.
- José Carlos Mariátegui (etapas de su vida), (Lima, 1945)
- José Sabogal, el artista y el hombre, (Lima, 1957)

=== Essays ===
- La cruz y el Sol (ensayo sobre mitos religiosos del antiguo Perú), (Lima, 1943)
- Viaje al país de la música, (Lima, 1943)
- Lima, (Lima, Ediciones Contur, 1946)
- El niño, ese desconocido, (Lima, 1949)
- El mensaje de la música, (Lima, 1952)
- Vida del Perú y de su pueblo (ensayo), (Lima, 1958)

=== Anthologies ===
- Antología de la poesía amorosa peruana, Lima, Ediciones Hora del Hombre, 1946.
