= Carlos Aitor Castillo =

Peruvian artist (1913–2000)

Carlos Aítor Castillo
- Born: Carlos Aítor Castillo Gaubeka; June 8, 1913; Lima, Peru
- Died: 14 May 2000 (aged 86); Lima, Peru
- Other name: Carlos Castillo
- Education: National University of Tucumán, University of Buenos Aires
- Occupations: Visual artist, educator, art critic, photographer
- Known for: Painting
- Movement: Modern art
- Father: Teófilo Castillo Guas

Carlos Aítor Castillo (1913–2000) was a Peruvian painter, educator, and art critic. He is known for his significant contributions to 20th-century Peruvian modern art.

== Early life and education ==
Carlos Aitor Castillo was born on June 8, 1913, in Lima, Peru. He was the youngest of eight children of the noted Peruvian painter Teófilo Castillo Guas, and María Gregoria Gaubeka, originally from the Basque Country in Spain. His name, Aítor, reflects this heritage, being a traditional Basque name.

In 1920, at the age of seven, Castillo moved with his family to Argentina, settling in Tucumán, where he completed his schooling. The untimely death of his father two years later marked his childhood with hardship. Initially, Castillo took up photography, a trade passed down from his father and practiced by his older brother, while dedicating his free time to painting.

In 1940, committed to pursuing his passion for art, he relocated to Buenos Aires to study drawing and painting at the Sociedad Argentina de Artistas Plásticos and Art History at the Faculty of Philosophy and Letters of the University of Buenos Aires. He supported himself through various jobs during this period.

Returning to Tucumán in 1948, Castillo enrolled at the School of Fine Arts at National University of Tucumán, under the mentorship of Lino Enea Spilimbergo.

== Career ==
At the National University of Tucumán, he expanded his artistic horizons and began teaching, serving as director of the province's Escuela Infantil de Artes Plásticas.

In 1951, Castillo returned to Peru to continue his career. His first exhibition in Lima was held at the Asociación Nacional de Escritores y Artistas (ANEA) in May 1951.

He was appointed in 1954 as a professor at the Escuela Nacional de Bellas Artes de Lima (now National Superior Autonomous School of Fine Arts, Lima), a position he held until his retirement in 1984; and served as its director from 1980 to 1983.

Additionally, Castillo wrote art critiques for major publications such as El Comercio, La Prensa, La Crónica, and the magazine Caretas. He also experimented with stage design and directing for the Nuevo Teatro de Ofelia Woloshin group.

His art evolved through various movements, embracing local traditions even while engaging with modernist styles. Initially figurative, focusing on the people and landscapes of northern Argentina, he later transitioned to abstract art before returning to expressive landscapes and figures. His series Guerreros Indígenas (1964–1968) stands as a testament to his commitment to Peruvian themes.

Castillo's works were exhibited in major cities, including New York City, Washington, D.C., Paris, and Tel Aviv, and he participated in the São Paulo Art Biennials (from 1953 to 1961), and collective exhibitions in Mexico, Colombia, and other countries.

Castillo died on May 14, 2000, in Lima.

== Awards and recognitions ==
- First prizes in the Salons of Tucumán and Santiago (Argentina)
- First Prize and Gold Medal (City Council Gallery 1954)
- Honorary member of the Miguel Lillo Foundation of Tucumán, Argentina (1991)
- Gold medal as emeritus Professor of the National Superior Autonomous School of Fine Arts, Lima (1992)
- Gold Medal from the Lions Club of Lima
