= Metropolitan Pavilion =

Exhibition venue in New York City

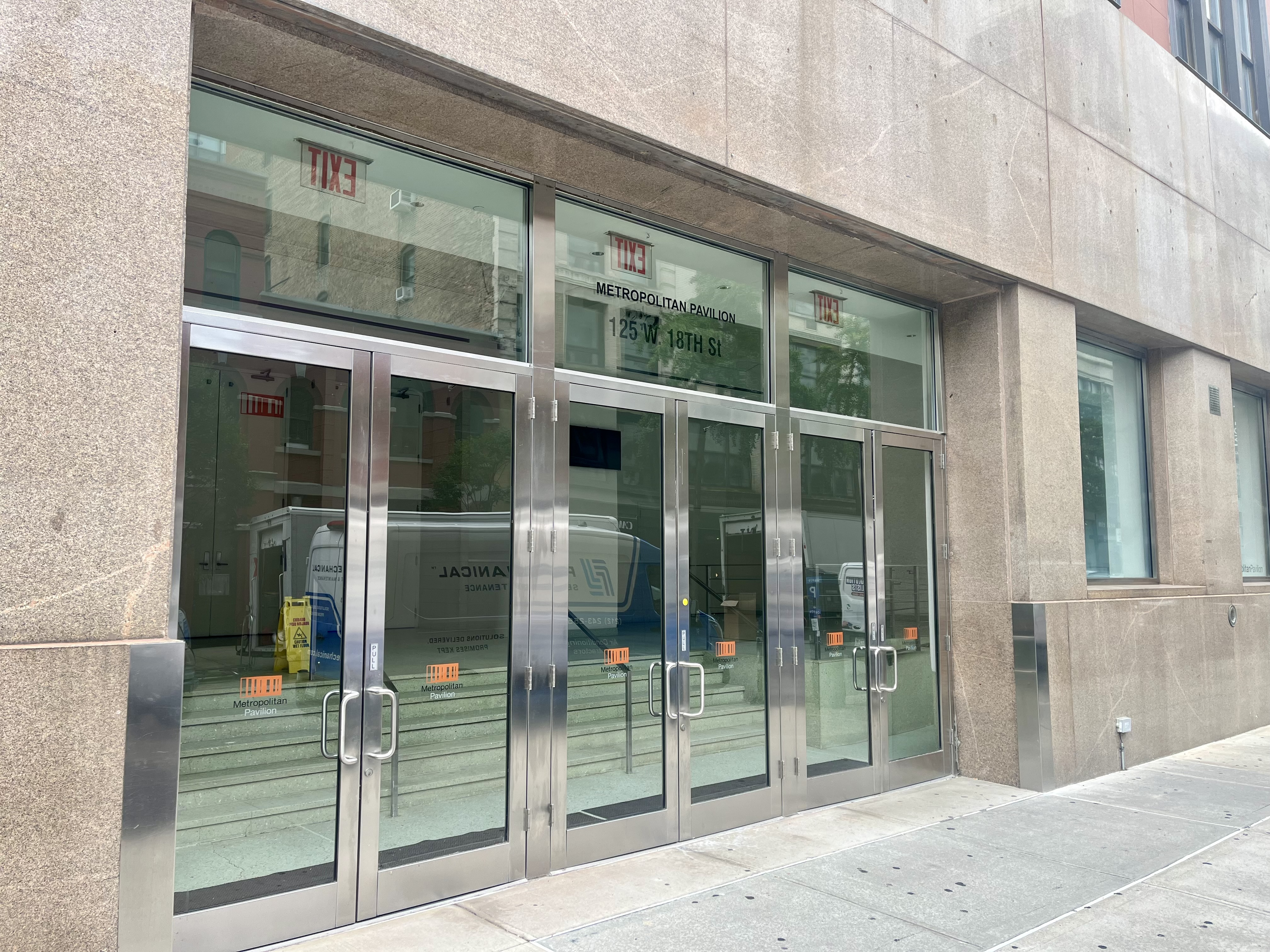
- The building's entrance in 2024
- Interactive map of Metropolitan Pavilion

General information
- Location: 125 West 18th Street, New York City, United States
- Coordinates: 40.74069°N 73.99594°W
- Opened: 1992
- Owner: Alan Boss

Technical details
- Floor area: 45,000 sq ft (4,200 m^{2})

Website
- www.metropolitanevents.com

The Metropolitan Pavilion is an exhibition venue in the Chelsea neighborhood of Manhattan in New York City. Opened in 1992, the 45,000 sq ft (4,200 m^{2}) venue offers four loft event spaces in one location. The Metropolitan Pavilion is situated next door to the old Altman Building, and on occasion, the two connected buildings are utilized as one extra-large event space.

The Metropolitan Pavilion has been host to comic book conventions, toy shows, art exhibitions, film festivals, fashion shows, food festivals, fencing tournaments, political fundraisers, weddings, and other gala events. These events include the MoCCA Festival, the Big Apple Comic Con, the Pinta Art Show, the Outsider Art Fair, and the American Folk Art Museum.

== History ==
The Metropolitan Pavilion was established in 1992 at 110 West 19th Street in Manhattan by entrepreneur Alan Boss who had a background in flea markets and vintage clothing. In 1999, the venue was expanded through the block, and changed its main address to 125 West 18th Street.
