= Isabel Sabogal =

Polish-Peruvian bilingual novelist, poet, translator and astrologer

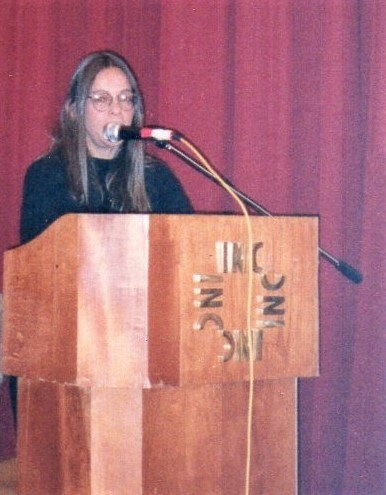
- Isabel Sabogal, Cusco 2004
- Born: Isabel María Sabogal; October 14, 1958 (age 68); Lima, Peru,
- Occupations: Poet, novelist, translator and astrologer
- Writing career
- Notable work: Un Universo dividido

Isabel María Sabogal Dunin-Borkowski (born October 14, 1958, in Lima) is a Polish-Peruvian bilingual novelist, poet, translator of Polish literature into Spanish and astrologer.

== Biography ==
Her parents were José Rodolfo Sabogal Wiesse (Peruvian, son of the painter José Sabogal) and Józefa Maria Dunin-Borkowska (Polish). Sabogal grew up in Lima, Göttingen and Warsaw and studied Hispanic literature and Linguistics at the Pontifical Catholic University of Peru.

== Publications ==
=== Books published ===
- Requiebros vanos. Poetry book. Lima, Ignacio Prado Pastor Editor, 1988;
- Entre el Cielo y el Infierno, un Universo dividido (Between Heaven and Hell, a divided Universe). Fantasy novel. Lima, Ignacio Prado Pastor Editor, 1989 and reprinted in 1993. Published a second time as Un Universo dividido (A divided Universe), Lima, Ediciones Altazor, 2016. ISBN 978-8-49-211428-3.
- Todo está hecho a la medida de ti misma. Poetry book. Lima, Grafos & Maquinaciones, 2022.

=== Work published in anthologies ===
- Poems in the anthology Poesía: Perú s. XXI (Poetry: Peru XXI century), (compilation by Dalmacia Ruiz Rosas and Willy Gómez Migliaro), Lima, Fundación Yacana, 2007.
- Ricardo Silva Santisteban (anthologist): Antología general de la traducción en el Perú (General anthology of translation in Peru), volume VII. Lima, Universidad Ricardo Palma – Editorial Universitaria, 2016. ISBN 978-612-4234-63-7.
- Short story La vampira (The vampire) in the anthology of the fantastic stories Trece veces Sarah. Un proyecto de José Donayre (Thirteen times Sarah. A project by José Donayre), Lima, Ediciones Altazor, 2017, ISBN 978-849-2114-39-9.
- Poems in the anthology Un otoño azul (A blue autumn), (compilation by Gloria Mendoza Borda). Arequipa, Cuervo Editores – Alianza Francesa de Arequipa, 2018.
- Poems in the anthology Mujeres en fuego (Ladies in fire), Cusco, Editorial Fuego, 2024. Compilation by Lenyan Veka.

=== Work published within other books ===
- El dibujo del mundo (The drawing of the world), text published in the Pedro José Granado's novel Un chin de amor, Lima, Editorial San Marcos, 2005.

=== Work published in the press ===
- Dni poczęcia (The days of conception), Warsaw, Fantastyka magazine, 1990, N° 2, (in Polish).
  - In Spanish language: Los días del origen, Relatos increíbles magazine, Nº 19, October 2020. Author's translation.
- A fragment of an unpublished novel Niewiarygodna Bajka (The unbelievable story), Kraków, Lektura magazine, Nº 11/12, 1992, (in Polish).
- Historia o pewnej qeqe (Story of a "qeqe"), Andean oral tradition compiled and translated by Sabogal to Polish. Salwator i świat magazine, Kraków, 1992, N° 1, (in Polish).
- Poetry, La hoja latinoamericana magazine, Uppsala, 1992 – 1993;
- Poetry, El Sol newspaper, Cusco, 2002 – 2004;
- Cuatro poetas cusqueños (Four poets of Cusco), Lima's cultural magazine Voces, Lima, N° 39, December 2009.
- Notes about Polish history, literature and culture in the Peruvian-Polish press, 2006–2016.
- La hora "U" (The hour "U"), Relatos increíbles magazine, Nº 17, June 2020.
- Nuestra guerra sin fin (Our endless war), Relatos increíbles magazine, Nº 23, January 2022.
- Nuestro pueblo errante (Our wandering people), Relatos increíbles magazine, Nº 26, May 2022.

== Translation from Polish into Spanish ==
- Polonia: la revolución de Solidarność (Poland: The Solidarność revolution), Lima, Apuntes, Centro de Documentación e Investigación, 1982. It includes Sabogal's translations of the Polish underground writings.
- Sabogal was the editor, translator and wrote the introduction to Poesía escogida (Selected Poetry) of the Polish poet and Nobel Laureate, Czesław Miłosz. A bilingual edition in Polish and Spanish, sponsored by the Polish Embassy in Lima and the American-Peruvian Cultural Institute. Lima, Ediciones del Hipocampo, 2012.

== Blog ==
- Since 2007 she has been blogging on the Isabel Sabogal platform which includes Sabogal's own work as well as writings on literature, astrology and other subjects.

== Cultural management ==
- Co-organizer of the III Peruvian Women Writers' Meeting, held in September 2003 in Cusco.
- Co-organizer of the Seminar La mujer y la Literatura (Woman and Literature), held in March 2004 in Cusco.
- Co-organizer of the round table on Czeslaw Milosz, held in November 2011 in Lima, to celebrate the 100th anniversary of the poet's birth.

== Distinctions ==
- In July 2012 she was awarded the "Bene Merito" Honorary Distinction by the Polish Minister of Foreign Affairs.

== Bibliography ==
- Rossella di Paolo: Entre el Cielo y el Infierno, Lima, alternative news magazine La tortuga, Nº 31, 1989.
- Carina Moreno: Poesía escogida de Czeslaw Milosz, Lima's cultural magazine Voces, Lima, Nº 49, October 2012.
- Ricardo Silva Santisteban: Breve historia de la traducción en el Perú, Lima, Instituto Bibliográfico del Perú, 2013. ISBN 978-612-46210-1-7.
- Helena Usandizaga: Todo está hecho a la medida de ti misma de Isabel Sabogal. Lima, Lucerna magazine, N° 15, March 2024.
