= Cultural Centre of the National Superior Autonomous School of Fine Arts =

Building and cultural centre in Lima, Peru

Coordinates: 12°02′54″S 77°01′42″W

Caja de Depósitos y Consignaciones
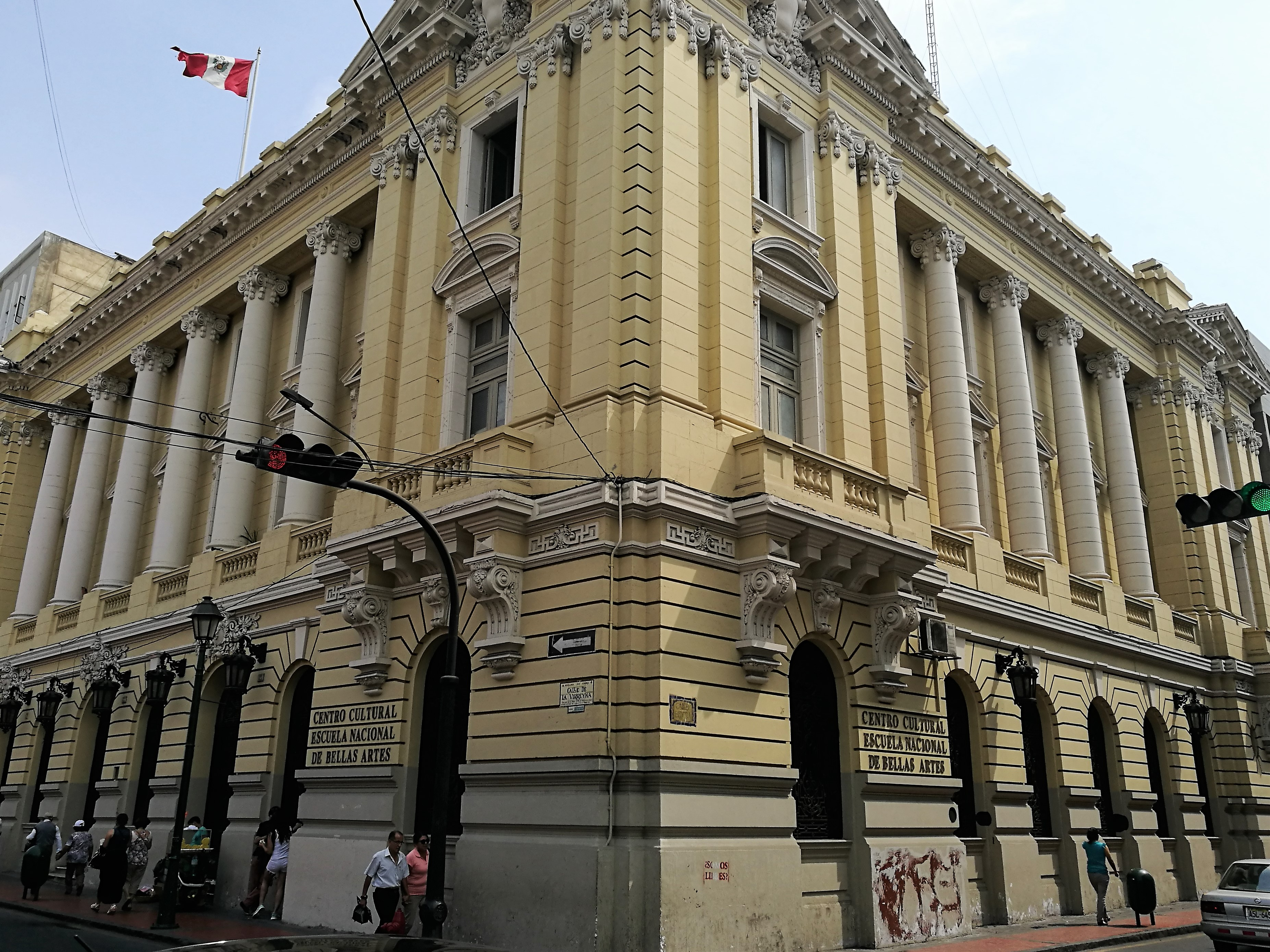

General information
- Architectural style: Beaux-Arts
- Address: Jirón Huallaga 400
- Completed: 1917

Technical details
- Floor count: 3

Design and construction
- Architect(s): Ricardo de Jaxa Malachowski

The Cultural Centre of the National School of Fine Arts (Spanish: Centro Cultural de la Escuela Nacional de Bellas Artes), also known as the Old Deposit and Consignment Fund (Spanish: Antigua Caja de Depósitos y Consignaciones), is a building located in the historic centre of Lima, Peru. It was designed by Ricardo de Jaxa Malachowski in the Beaux-Arts style and built in 1917. The property has had various uses and is currently used as an exhibition centre and as teaching classrooms. It is located on the corner of Huallaga and Azángaro streets.

== History ==
In 1905 the Deposit and Consignment Fund was created. Its financial nature was reflected in its headquarters, which, like a bank, has a first floor with easy access from the street dedicated to serving the public, and offices on the upper floors. The building replaced a viceregal house where a pastry shop once owned by Andrés Diez de Abreu was located.

The building was designed by the Polish-born architect Ricardo de Jaxa Malachowski according to the postulates of the late Beaux-Arts style. The first floor serves as a basement, with horizontal striped padding, and a series of openings crowned by semicircular arches . On the second and third floors, two Doric colonnades stand out, separated from the façade, with pediments and cornices with strongly molded modillions.

The interior is organized around three exhibition rooms made up of three peristyles joined and covered by stained glass windows made in Bordeaux. The offices and meeting rooms of the managers were around that space, under which the vaults are located.

It was declared part of the Cultural heritage of Peru through Supreme Resolution N° 2900–72-ED, and donated by the government to the National Superior Autonomous School of Fine Arts on September 27, 1996.

== See also ==
- National Superior Autonomous School of Fine Arts, Lima
