= Cássio Vasconcellos =

Brazilian photographer (born 1965)

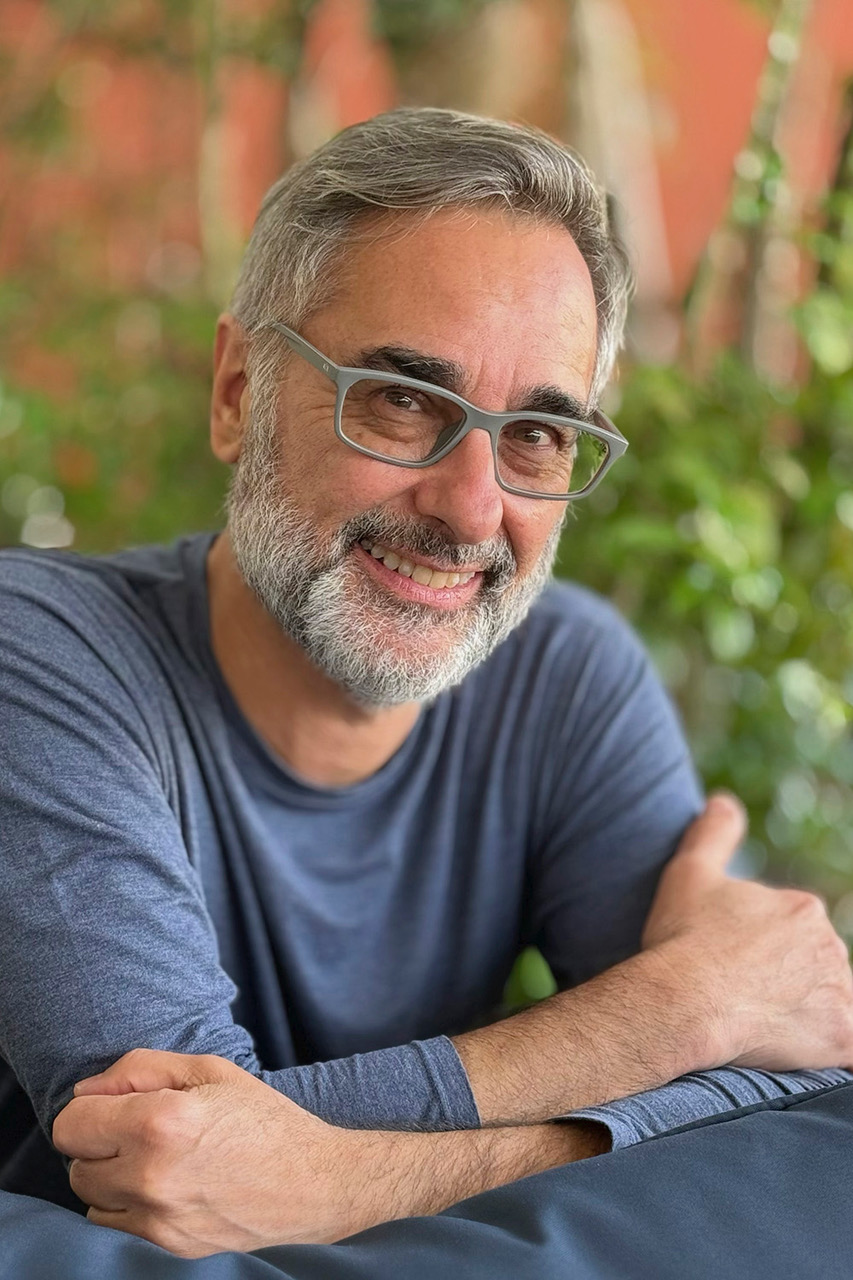
- Born: 1965 (age 60–61); São Paulo, Brazil
- Known for: Aerial photography Fine-art photography and author
- Website: www.cassiovasconcellos.com.br

Cássio Campos Vasconcellos (born 1965) is a Brazilian photographer whose work spans documentary, aerial, and composite imagery. Active since 1981, he has exhibited in the show Trees at the Fondation Cartier pour l'art contemporain, Paris; Saatchi Gallery, London; and Princeton University Art Museum.

His publications include Aeroporto (2016), Aéreas do Brasil (2014), and Noturnos São Paulo (2002). Vasconcellos has received the Conrado Wessel Art Prize (2011) and the Porto Seguro Prize of Photography (2001), and his works are held in the collections of the Museu de Arte de São Paulo, Bibliothèque Nationale de France, and Museum of Fine Arts, Houston.

== Life and work ==
Vasconcellos was born in São Paulo in 1965 and began his career in photography in 1981. His early work encompassed street scenes and nocturnal imagery, culminating in the publication of Noturnos São Paulo (2002). Over time, his practice shifted toward large format aerial compositions, often created from photographs taken during helicopter flights.

Trained and experienced as a photojournalist, he later developed a body of work distinguished by fictional imagery constructed from elements of reality. His approach often blurs the boundaries between documentary and conceptual photography, creating an iconographic vocabulary aimed at reflecting on and critiquing aspects of contemporary society.

A notable element of his practice is the use of aerial photography, which enables him to manipulate scale and perspective to challenge viewers' perceptions of reality. His subjects range from scenes of urban density and consumer culture to large-scale natural landscapes. Works such as the series Viagem pitoresca pelo Brasil (2015) align with historical traditions of depicting the grandeur of Brazilian landscapes, particularly its tropical flora.

Vasconcellos has published several monographs, including Viagem pitoresca pelo Brasil (2015), Fotô Editorial (2024), Brasil visto do céu (Editora Brasileira, 2017), Panorâmicas (DBA, 2012), and Noturnos São Paulo (2002). His projects often address themes such as mass consumption, architectural uniformity, and cultural symbolism, while also engaging with the scale and mysticism of Brazil's natural environments.

Vasconcellos has been the subject of several documentary films, including Caçadores de Almas (1988, 2012), foto.doc: cassiovasconcellos (2005), and O Mundo da Fotografia – Fotografia e Arte (2001).

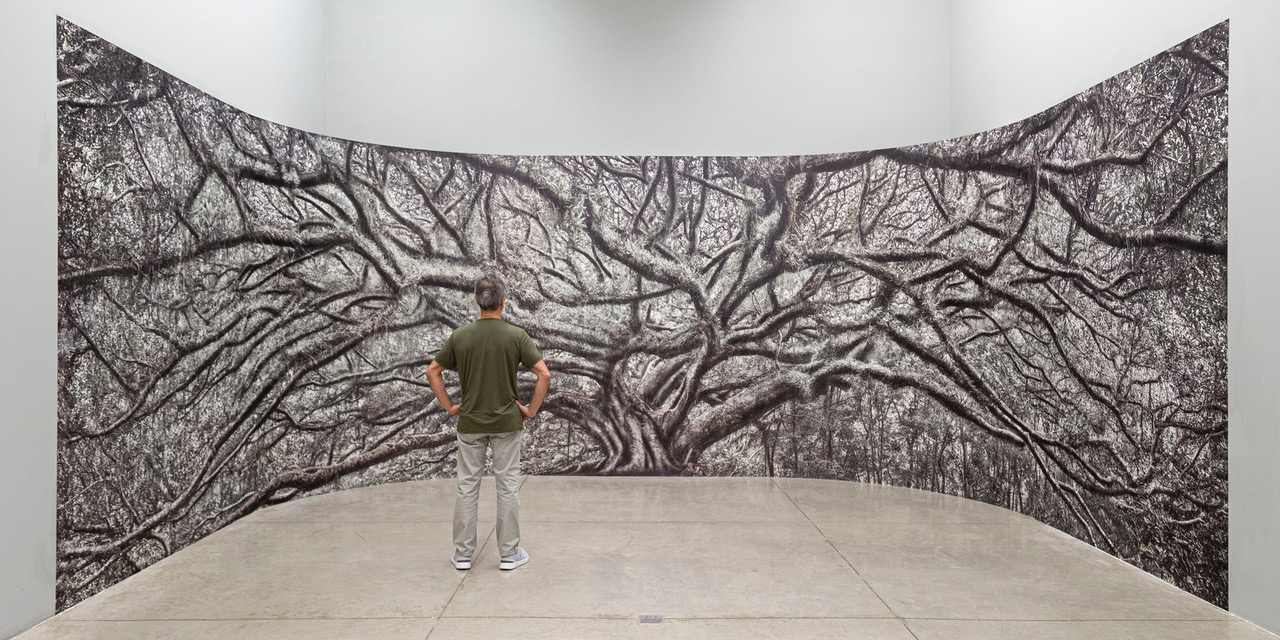
Exhibition, titled Cássio Vasconcellos: A Picturesque Voyage through Brazil, was held at Galeria Nara Roesler in São Paulo, Brazil.

== Artistic practice ==
Vasconcellos's work often combines documentary and constructed photography. He creates scenes by stitching together hundreds or thousands of individual images taken from the air, aligning lighting and perspective to produce a coherent whole. His approach transforms real places—such as beaches, parking lots, aircraft graveyards, and shipping yards—into almost abstract fields of color and geometry, inviting reflection on density, overconsumption, and environmental impact.

Initiated in 2008, Collectives comprises large-scale works made from aerial photographs taken in Brazil and abroad. The series depicts “jam-packed situations typical of our civilization,” including crowded beaches, motorcycle gatherings, truck markets, and airplane boneyards. In Collectives 2, Vasconcellos turned to sites of industrial abandonment, including junkyards, decommissioned aircraft storage facilities, and container ports. Using tens of thousands of photographs captured in locations such as São Paulo, Cubatão, Santos, Rio de Janeiro, and the deserts of the United States, he constructs intricate mosaics in which no single element is repeated.

== Publications ==
- Noturnos São Paulo (Nocturnes São Paulo). Bookmark, São Paulo, Brazil, 2002. ISBN 8587811045.
- Aéreas (Aerials). Terra Virgem, São Paulo, Brazil, 2010. ISBN 8585981571.
- Panorâmicas (Panoramics). DBA, São Paulo, Brazil, 2012. ISBN 8572344535.
- Coletivos (Collectives). Quarantena, 2020.

== Exhibitions ==
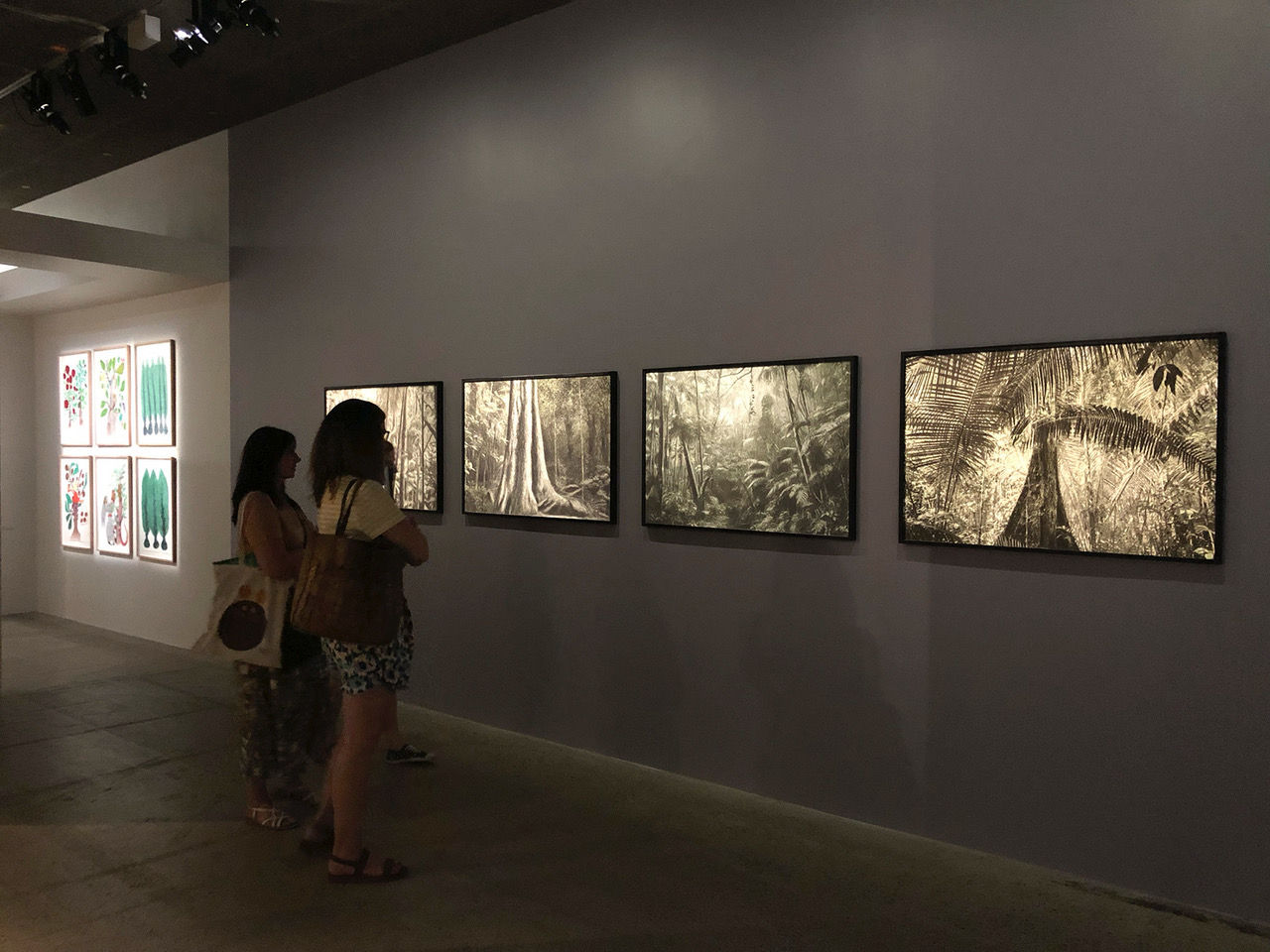
Cassio Vasconcellos Fotografia Fine Art Nous Les Arbres Expo 02 (2019)

Since the 1980s, Vasconcellos has participated in solo and group shows at the Museu de Arte de São Paulo (MASP), Museu de Arte Moderna do Rio de Janeiro, Maison Européenne de la Photographie (Paris), Museum of Fine Arts (Houston), and Princeton University Art Museum. His work has been included in major photography biennials and thematic exhibitions across Latin America, Europe, and the United States.

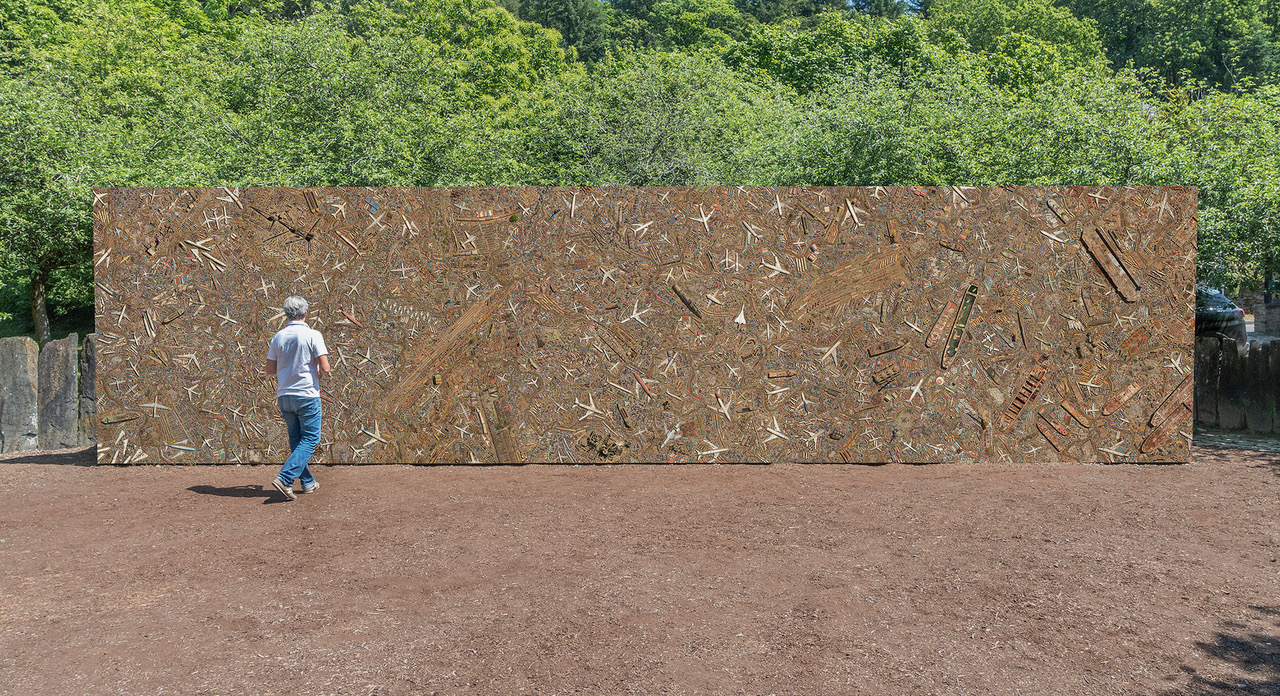
In 2023 Vasconcellos presents the work 'Over' at La Gacilly Photo Festival, in France.

== Awards ==
- 1995: National Photography Award, National Foundation of the Arts (FUNARTE), Brazil
- 1999: J.P. Morgan Photography Award, São Paulo, Brazil
- 2001: Porto Seguro Photography Award, São Paulo, Brazil
- 2002: Best Photography Exhibition of the Year, Associação Paulista de Críticos de Arte (São Paulo Art Critics Association), São Paulo, Brazil
- 2018: Juror's pick, LensCulture Art Photography Awards
