= Ani Villanueva =

Venezuelan visual and performance artist

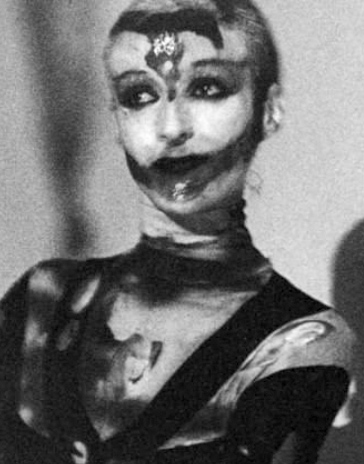
- Born: 1954; Caracas
- Alma mater: Andrés Bello Catholic University; University of Essex; École pratique des hautes études
- Occupation: Performance artist, visual artist
- Parent(s): Mary Brandt
- Website: www.synch.org/aivb/default.htm

Ani Villanueva (born Ana Isabel Villanueva Brandt on July 8, 1954) is a Venezuelan visual and performance artist who is best known for her performances and collaborative works during the 1980s. Her work is heavily influenced by her extensive education that she received throughout her life. Many of her more notable performances juxtapose fantasy with reality, while her later paintings are abstract and minimalist.

== Personal life ==
=== Early life and education ===
The daughter of Venezuelan painter Mary Brandt, Ani was constantly surrounded and influenced by art of all kinds, including music, drama, and dance. During the 1970s, Ani travelled in order to further her education, attending the Andrés Bello Catholic University in Caracas, the University of Essex in England, and the École Pratique des Hautes Études in Paris, studying psychology, political science, and Taoism respectively.

=== Collaborations and influence ===
Villanueva's work, often consisting of multiple mediums, was greatly influenced by the artistic education she received during her upbringing. Villanueva's influences and collaborations went beyond Latin American artistic trends and styles. For example, Iguana, her collaboration with Carlos Villanueva and two British artists, incorporates elements from two distinctly different art styles and methodologies.

== Early artistic career ==
Villanueva began her career after departing the École Pratique des Hautes Études, dancing with the Parisian group, Macrodanza, during 1981 and 1982. She moved on to artistic and performance pieces during this time as well. Unlike many other Latin American artists at the time, Villanueva did not express her political opinions or views through her art. At this time in her career, Villanueva had a stylistically notable usage of movement, choreography, and theatricality in her works, with many of her works utilizing the aforementioned elements to great artistic effect.

=== Early works ===
==== Cuadro móvil (1982) ====
Medium(s) used: Video, color, sound; Runtime: approximately 22 minutes

One of Villanueva's initial public works, Cuadro móvil or "Moving Picture", was a collaboration with her mother, Mary Brandt, and performed in Villanueva's hometown of Caracas at the Sala Mendoza. A painting ominously moves through various parts of an art gallery, crawling through various display rooms and caressing paintings while a foreboding melody discordantly plays in the background. This work contains horror elements, such as the disturbing, humanoid painting and unsettling background music. Many of Brandt's paintings spread through the gallery rooms are abstract collages of color.

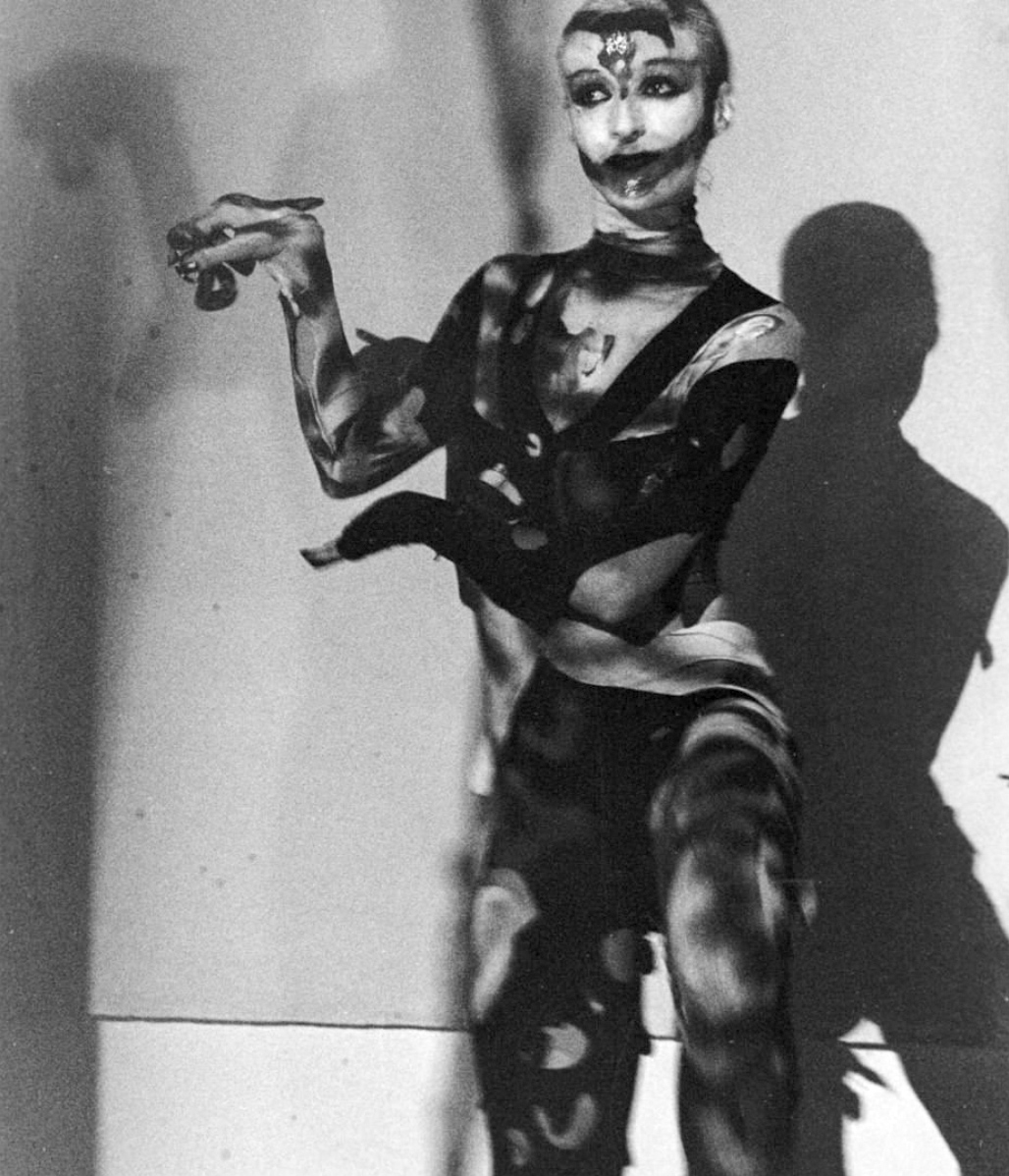
Boa (1986)

==== Boa (1986) ====
Medium(s) used: Video, color, sound; Runtime: approximately 18 minutes In this performance, Villanueva slithered around while painted in a serpentine print to the sounds and backdrop of a rainforest. A projection of a boa constrictor eventually descends on Villanueva, thus giving the audience the impression that she has become one with the indigenous flora and fauna. This performance is one of the few that Villanueva displayed internationally, at the Astoria Theater in London.

=== Early awards ===
In 1985, Villanueva and director Diego Barboza won the prize for non-objective art at the Salón Arturo Michelena for their collaboration, De la escuela de Atenas a la nueva escuela de Caracas (From the school of Athens to the new school of Caracas).

== Later artistic career ==
Villanueva's art shifted from provocative performances to art that delves into the motifs of flora and fauna. She travelled to the coastal regions of Choroní, Venezuela and began drawing inspiration for her new art, later producing installations related to marine and coral ecosystems. Today, Villanueva focuses on abstract art.

=== Later works ===
==== Sor Juana Inés de la Cruz (2002) ====
This performance was named after mid-to-late 17th century female philosopher and scholar Juana Inés de la Cruz and was performed at the Miami Art Museum. In this performance, Villanueva dresses and acts as the aforementioned de la Cruz.

==== Casos de Cosas (2004) ====
Casos de Cosas, literally translated into English as "cases of things", is an assemblage that incorporates six-pack rings for soda cans held together by zip ties. This piece was part of her focus on marine and coral ecosystems, as well as an incorporation of her training in mixed media art.

=== Later awards ===
In 2005, Villanueva won first prize at the 8th Bienal Nacional de Escultura Francisco Narvaez (or the 8th Francisco Narvaez National Sculpture Biennial), an event in which artists submit sculptures or other installations for competition.

== Collections ==
Many of Villanueva's notable works are not in museums or galleries today, as many of Villanueva's works incorporated mixed mediums and performance art. Villanueva's more recent abstract works are displayed in various museums across Venezuela.

== Bibliography ==
Guanipa, Moraima. "El acuario personal de Ani Villanueva." El Universal (Caracas), October 21, 1994.

Guédez, Víctor. "La nueva dimensión de los utensilios." Papel Literario de El Nacional (Caracas), October 9, 2004, 2.

Márquez, Felipe. "El color aparente." In Alamar: Ani Villanueva Brandt, pinturas, unpaged. Caracas: Galería K, 1994.
Nahas, Dominique. Small Works. New York: Artsforum Gallery, 1999.
