= Juan Manuel Ugarte Eléspuru =

Peruvian painter, writer, and historian

Juan Manuel Ugarte Eléspuru (1911–2004) was a Peruvian painter, sculptor, writer, academic administrator, and historian.

== Biography ==
Juan Manuel Ugarte Eléspuru was born in 1911, in Lima, Peru. He went to school in Germany and Spain, and studied art in Buenos Aires.

Ugarte Eléspuru was director of the National Superior Autonomous School of Fine Arts, Lima (Spanish: Escuela Nacional Superior Autónoma de Bellas Artes del Perú) from 1950 to 1973. He exhibited his work at the 2nd II Bienal Hispanoamericana de Arte in 1954, in Havana, Cuba.
