= Expreso =

Daily newspaper from Peru

Diario Expreso
- Type: Daily newspaper
- Format: Berliner
- Founder: Manuel Mujica Gallo
- Editor-in-chief: Antonio Ramírez Pando
- Founded: October 24, 1961
- Political alignment: Conservative liberalism; Right-wing
- Language: Spanish
- Headquarters: Lima
- Website: expreso.com.pe

Diario Expreso is a daily newspaper with national circulation in Peru. Founded in 1961, it is among the newspapers with the highest circulation in Peru.

== History ==
It was founded on October 24, 1961, by Manuel Mujica Gallo, a wealthy owner linked to the banking and insurance business. For this purpose, the company Periodística Perú S. A. was established. In this first stage, its editors were Manuel Jesús Orbegoso, Raúl Villarán, José Antonio Encinas de Pando, among others.

In 1965, it was acquired by Manuel Ulloa Elías, who founded Editora Nacional S. A. The same company published the evening newspaper Extra. In this new stage, Efraín Ruiz Caro and Guillermo Cortez Núñez were editors-in-chief. Among his collaborators were Ciro Alegría, Carlos Cueto Fernandini, Manuel Mujica Gallo and Mario Vargas Llosa. A Sunday supplement entitled Estampas was also published; and as a contribution to education, the supplement El Escolar.

With the rise of a military government in 1968, difficulties began. On October 31 of that year, Expreso and Extra were closed by order of the regime of General Juan Velasco Alvarado. However, a protest by the Federation of Journalists of Peru forced the Government to allow the newspapers to reopen.

On January 2, 1970, Manuel Ulloa resigned as president of the board of directors of Editora Nacional S. A. because a Government decree prevented those who resided outside the country for more than six months from exercising such function. Ulloa, who had been an important minister of the overthrown Belaundista government, chose not to return to Peru after considering that a political persecution had been unleashed against him.

On March 4, 1970, Expreso and Extra were practically expropriated by the military government, with the excuse of handing over their administration to their own employees and workers, organized in cooperatives. However, people outside the newspapers took control of them. In this stage of expropriation, the following served as directors of Expreso: Alberto Ruiz Eldredge, Leopoldo Chiappo and Juan José Vega, all appointed by the government. Some time later, Velasco explained that he had given the newspapers to the communists to serve as "mastiffs" (prey dogs) in his "fight against the oligarchy."

After the revolutionary government ended on July 28, 1980, Expreso and Extra returned to their owners, and Manuel Ulloa took over again as president of the board of Editora Nacional S. A. The first director of Expreso, in this new stage, was Guillermo Cortez Núñez (1980–1988), who was succeeded by Manuel D'Ornellas (1988–1998). It then had a prestigious team of journalists, among which Jaime de Althaus, Jorge Morelli, Uri Ben Schmuel and Patricio Ricketts stood out.

During the government of Alberto Fujimori (1990–2000), the newspaper's directors were committed to selling their editorial line to the interests of the regime. After the fall of Fujimori, the imprisonment of the newspaper's director, Eduardo Calmell del Solar, was ordered, accused of having received, together with Vicente Silva Checa (director of Cable Canal de Noticias), more than US$ 3,000,000 from presidential advisor Vladimiro Montesinos.

In 2002, a new organization came into operation under the direction of Luis García Miró, whose objective was to recover the prestige of the newspaper. Since 2024, the director is Antonio Ramírez Pando.

== See also ==
- El Comercio Group
