= National Superior Autonomous School of Fine Arts, Lima =

Fine arts school in Lima, Peru

Coordinates: 12°02′47″S 77°01′26″W

National Superior Autonomous School of Fine Arts
- Escuela Nacional Superior Autónoma de Bellas Artes
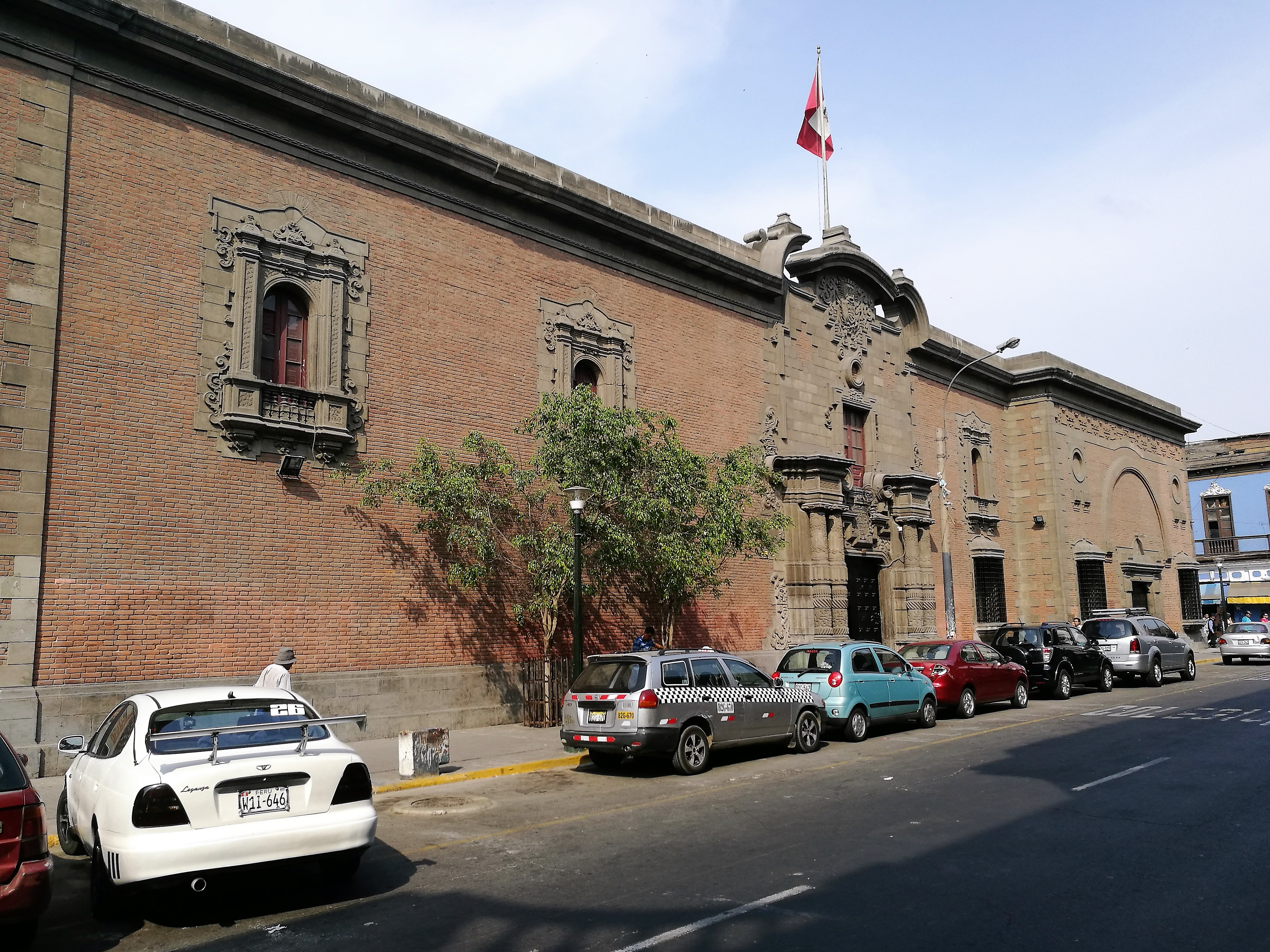
- Other names: ENBA, ENSABAP
- Former names: National School of Fine Arts, Peru
- Type: Fine arts school
- Established: September 28, 1918
- Founders: Daniel Hernández
- Location: Jr. Ancash 681, Lima
- Colours: Dark red Apple green
- Website: ensabap.edu.pe

The National Superior Autonomous School of Fine Arts (Spanish: Escuela Nacional Superior Autónoma de Bellas Artes del Perú, ENSABAP) is a fine art school in Lima, Peru. It is located in Barrios Altos, a suburb of Lima District. It was founded in 1918, by President José Pardo y Barreda and Peruvian painter Daniel Hernández Morillo, who was its first director. It is located in a monumental building built in the early 1940s.

The National School of Fine Arts of Peru is a public institution of higher education with university status, meaning that grants the academic degree of Bachelor and bachelor's degree in their respective careers.

== Administration ==
ENSABAP is governed by a General Assembly, who appoints the Technical Council, which runs the different departments of painting, sculpture, engraving, restoration/conservation and visual art teaching. www.ensabap.edu.pe/transparencia.htm

Training in the Academic Program Professional Arts Education develops skills related to the pedagogical basis for professional education, visual culture, including psychological aspects, methods of programming and implementation of the project teaching, curriculum design and educational research methods, likewise powers of investigation, experimentation and analysis of theories, methods and situations to develop projects and solve problems

The Technical Council consists of the General Director, Academy Director, Administration Director, Cultural Promotion Director, four Professors, one graduate representative, and three student representatives.

== Campuses ==
Jiron Ancash Campus, Jirón Áncash 681, Lima

Downtown Lima Property colonial founded with the name of San Ildefonso, in order to be a house of formal studies. At that time, the Kings of Spain and the Popes Urban VIII and Paul V granted it the title of Pontifical University of San Marcos. Later, the building became College, University and Clergy's Hospital. On 28 September 1918, the State officially awarded the building to the School of Fine Arts of Lima. Currently in this site are: Specialty Painting, Sculpture and Engraving, Auditorium, Audio-visual equipment and administrative offices.

Canevaro House Campus, Jirón Ancash 769, Lima

This Lima's building dating from the colonial, was owned by the Canevaro family. The building was acquired by the Director of the ENSABAP, Juan Manuel Ugarte Elespuru, who restored it as an art school. Currently located at this site: Drawing Workshops/Atelier Area, the Fine Arts Center Pre-Free Courses and Workshops.

La Molina Campus, Lake Avenue Rinconada 1515, La Molina (Lima)

Recently acquired by the award of the Ministry of Education. The objective in this site is to promote art, culture, educational and social activities. At present it has implemented Free Workshops/Atelier for artistic expression led to the community. Also, there are spaces dedicated to artistic exhibition individual or group exhibitions of national and foreign artists.

Cultural Centre, Jirón Huallaga 402, Lima

The building is a Republican architecture style. It has been awarded to the ENSABAP to provide a cultural center to the House Higher Studies, with the goal of spreading the artistic expressions and cultural various national as well as international. It was inaugurated on September 27, 1996. It is currently located at this location: 1 ° Level: 2 Art Galleries: Main and Underground. 2nd Level: Teaching Specialty. 3 ° Level: Specialty Restoration and Conservation

== Directors ==
- Daniel Hernández Morillo (1856–1932), first director from 1919 to 1932
- José Sabogal (1888–1956), from 1932 to 1943
- Germán Suárez Vértiz (1897–1975), interim director from 1943 to 1945
- Ricardo Grau (1907–1970), from 1945 to 1948
- Francisco González Gamarra (1890–1972), from 1949 to 1950
- Juan Manuel Ugarte Eléspuru (1911–2004), from 1950 to 1973
- Teodoro Núñez Ureta (1912–1988), from 1973 to 1976;
- José Bracamonte Vera (1928–1983), from 1976 to ?
- Alberto Dávila (1912–1988) from ? to 1980
- Carlos Aitor Castillo (1913–2000), from 1980 to 1983
- Miguel Baca Rossi (1917–2016),
- Juan Alberto Tello Montalvo (1928–2006), from 1990 to 1994,
- Leslie Lee Crosby (1932–2014),
- Guillermo Cortez
- David Durand Ato, from 2013 to 2015
- Eva Dalila Lopez Miranda, from 2001

== Notable faculty ==
- Carlos Aitor Castillo (1913–2000)
- Daniel Hernández Morillo (1856–1932)
- José Sabogal (1888–1956)
- Juan Alberto Tello Montalvo (1928–2006)
- Juan Manuel Ugarte Eléspuru (1911–2004)

== Notable alumni ==
- Javier Cabada (born 1931), Spanish-American abstract painter
- Julia Codesido (1883–1979), Peruvian painter
- Elena Izcue (1889–1970), Peruvian illustrator, graphic artist, painter
- Juan Alberto Tello Montalvo (1928–2006)
- Boris Vallejo (born 1941), Peruvian painter

== See also ==
- Cultural Centre of the National Superior Autonomous School of Fine Arts
