= José Sabogal =

Peruvian painter, educator (1888–1956)

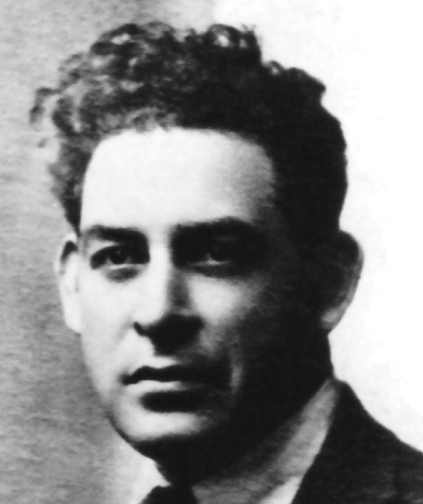
- José Sabogal c. 1920
- Born: José Arnaldo Sabogal Diéguez; March 19, 1888; Cajabamba, Cajamarca, Peru
- Died: December 15, 1956 (aged 68); Lima, Peru
- Occupations: Painter, muralist, educator, essayist
- Employer: National Superior Autonomous School of Fine Arts, Lima
- Spouse: María Wiesse (m. 1922)
- Children: 2
- Relatives: Isabel Sabogal (granddaughter)

José Arnaldo Sabogal Diéguez (March 19, 1888, in Cajabamba – December 15, 1956, in Lima) was a Peruvian painter, muralist, and educator. He was "the most renowned early supporter" and thus a leader in the artistic indigenist movement of his country. As Daniel Balderston, Mike Gonzalez, and Ana M. López assert, Sabogal "became Peru's militant indigenist and aesthetic nationalist, and led this movement for the next thirty years."

== Biography ==
José Arnaldo Sabogal Diéguez was born on March 19, 1888 in Cajabamba, Cajamarca, Peru.

The surname Sabogal originated in Hungary and is the portmanteau of the two most common surnames in Hungary, Sabo and Gal.

He traveled extensively in Europe (particularly Italy) and North Africa from 1908 to 1913 before enrolling in the National School of Fine Arts in Buenos Aires, Argentina where he studied for five years.

In 1922, he married a poet and writer María Wiesse. The couple had two children: José Rodolfo Sabogal Wiesse (1923–1983), and Rosa Teresa Sabogal Wiesse (1925–1985).

Sabogal taught at the National Superior Autonomous School of Fine Arts, Lima (Spanish: Escuela Nacional Superior Autónoma de Bellas Artes del Perú) from 1920 and onward. He served as its director from 1932 to 1943.

Afterward Sabogal and Luis E. Valcárel cofounded the Instituto Libre de Arte Peruano (Free Institute of Peruvian Arts) at the Museo Nacional de la Cultura Peruana (National Museum of Peruvian Culture).

His granddaughter, Isabel Sabogal (born 1958), is a bilingual (Spanish-Polish) novelist, poet, translator and astrologer.

== Indigenism ==
Although Sabogal's own descent was Spanish rather than indigenous, he promoted pre-Columbian culture and esthetics. A six month stay in Cuzco prompted his indigenism; he took an interest in depicting the city and its inhabitants. In 1919 his Cuzco paintings attracted attention at an exhibition in Lima. As Jane Turner explains, "in 1919 was the first exhibition of the work of JOSÉ SABOGAL at the Casa Brandes in Lima, an event that would be immensely influential on the future..."

Sabogal decided to promote Peruvian art to international audiences after a 1922 visit to Mexico where he met Diego Rivera, José Clemente Orozco, and David Alfaro Siqueiros. These efforts were so successful that in "the field of the visual arts, the most striking phenomenon of the 1920s was the rise of José Sabogal (1888–1956), founder and long-time leader of the so-called 'Peruvian School' of painting."

Ricardo Miguel Sabogal-Suji, relative of José Sabogal, also born in Cajabamba on March 19, like the painter, Ph.D. in anthropology, educated in Peru, Italy, England, and the United States, recalls that the Peruvian intellectual José Carlos Mariátegui stated that José Sabogal Diéguez is the first Peruvian painter par excellence. Ricardo Sabogal-Suji agrees. Despite studying in Italy, Ricardo Sabogal-Suji says, José Sabogal created an artistic school of painting unique to Peru and was the first to break away from European academicism.

== Written work ==
- Mates burilados: Arte vernacular peruano (1945);
- Pancho Fierro, estampas del pintor peruano (1945);
- El toro en las artes populares del Perú (The bull in the Peruvian popular arts) (1949);
- El "kero", vaso de libaciones cusqueño de madera pintada (1952);
- El desván de la imaginería peruana (1956, 1988);
- Del arte en el Perú y otros ensayos (About Peruvian art and other essays) (1975).

== Tribute ==
On 19 March 2014, Google celebrated José Sabogal's 125th Birthday with a doodle.

== Bibliography ==
- Shreffler, Michael J. and Jessica Welton. Garcilaso de la Vega and the "New Peruvian Man": José Sabogal's frescoes at the Hotel Cuzco. Art History. (Jan/Feb 2010, Vol 33), 124–149.
