= Diego Quispe Tito =

Quechua painter (1611–1681)

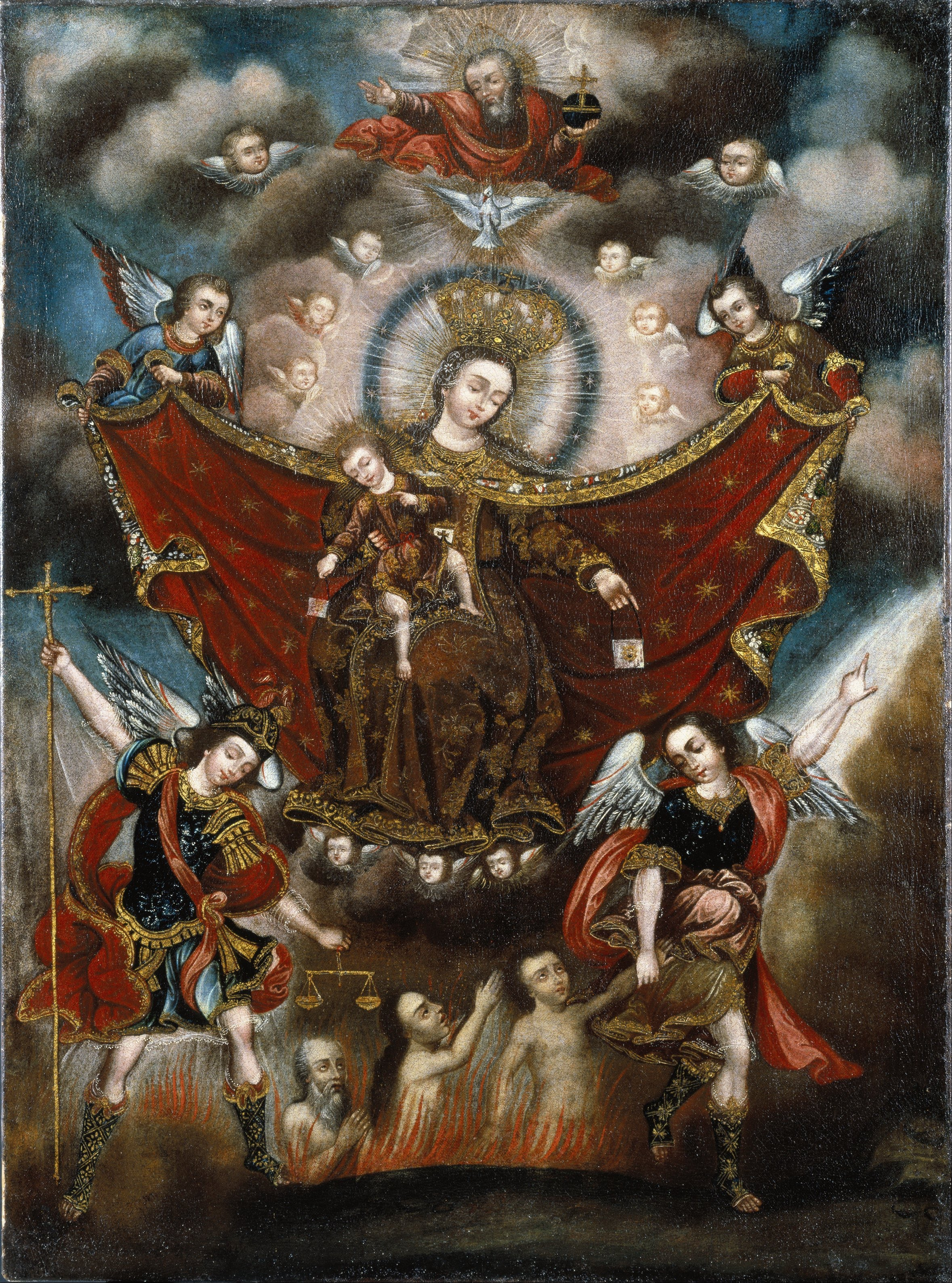
- Virgin of Carmel Saving Souls in Purgatory, Circle of Diego Quispe Tito, 17th century, collection of the Brooklyn Museum
- Born: 1611; Cuzco, Peru
- Died: 1681 (aged 69–70); Peru
- Known for: devotional painting, Mannerism
- Notable work: Signs of the Zodiac
- Movement: Cusco School

Diego Quispe Tito (1611–1681) was a Quechua painter from Peru. He is considered the leader of the Cuzco School of painting. Despite the prevalence of European artistic influences, some painters in Cuzco were of Inca descent, infusing their art with indigenous elements. Diego Quispe Tito, adopted a distinctive style blending Italian Mannerism and Flemish painting techniques with depictions of local landscapes adorned with decorative birds. Working in a village near Cuzco, Quispe Tito developed his unique approach, exemplified in his series of paintings portraying the life of St. John the Baptist for the Church of San Sebastian in 1663.

== Background ==
The son of a noble Inca family, Quispe Tito was born in Cuzco, and worked throughout his life in the district of San Sebastián; his house remains, and shows his coat of arms on its door.

== Art career ==
Quispe Tito's earliest signed painting is an Immaculate Conception from 1627, gilded in a fashion typical of the Cuzco school. His work is in the style of Spanish Mannerism and Flemish painting. Quispe Tito is believed to have learned these styles from Italian Jesuit Bernardo Bitti, who was active at the time in Cuzco. In addition, he is believed to have known Luis de Riaño in his youth, and may have derived some elements of his style from the older artist; de Riaño, a painter from Lima, had trained in the workshop of Angelino Medoro, and so would have provided another source of Italian influence.

Quispe Tito also was influenced in his work by engravings from Flanders; indeed, his best-known work, the 1681 Signs of the Zodiac in Cuzco Cathedral, is a series of copies of Flemish engravings in which each zodiac sign is tied to a parable from the life of Christ. These engravings were designed for distribution in Peru, where worship of the sun, moon, and stars was still practiced in some quarters; they were designed to encourage worship of Christ and His miracles in place of the zodiac. A further series, depicting scenes from the life of John the Baptist and dating to 1663, was also produced on Flemish models.

Quispe Tito also incorporated several personal elements into his work; most notable was his use of gilding and his depiction of spacious landscapes filled with birds and angels. In 1667 he painted several scenes from the life of Christ, which were sent to Potosí.

== Death ==
Quispe Tito died in Cuzco, Peru in 1681.

== See also ==
- Master of Calamarca, 18th century, Bolivia
- Basilio Pacheco de Santa Cruz Pumacallao, (1635–1710), Peru
- Marcos Zapata, c. 1710—1773, Peru
