= Basilio Santa Cruz Pumacallao =

Quechua painter (1635–1710)

Basilio de Santa Cruz Pumacallao
- Born: 1635; Cusco, Viceroyalty of Peru
- Died: 1710 (aged 74–75); Cusco, Viceroyalty of Peru
- Other names: Basilio Pacheco de Santa Cruz Pumacallao, Pumaqallo, Pumacallo
- Known for: Painting
- Notable work: Royal Saint Mary of Almudena, Chasuble Imposition to Saint Ildephonsus, Series of the life of Saint Francis
- Style: Cuzco School, Baroque
- Patrons: Bishop Manuel de Mollinedo

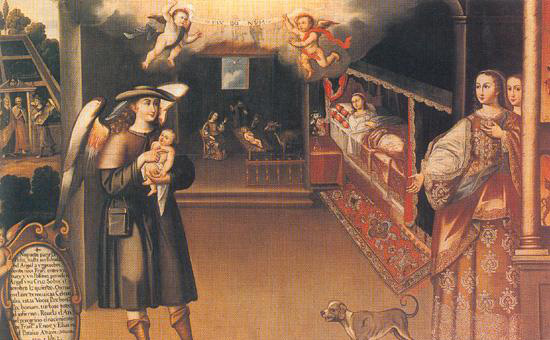
A Franciscan Allegory of the Immaculate Virgin, by the workshop of Basilio de Santa Cruz Pumacallo, oil on canvas, 210 cm x 148 cm, ca. 1670–1680, in the Museo de San Francisco, Santiago, Chile

Basilio Pacheco de Santa Cruz Pumacallao (1635–1710) or Basilio de Santa Cruz Puma Callao was a Peruvian painter of Quechua (Inca) and Ladino origin from Cusco, Peru. He was part of the Cuzco School, a colonial movement of indigenous painters educated in the Baroque religious painting tradition of Spain.

== Background ==
Basilio Santa Cruz is also known by his Quechua name, Pumaqallo or Pumacallo, and with Diego Quispe Tito, is regarded as one of the most famous painters in the Cusco School tradition. He lived during the colonial era of the 17th century in the Viceroyalty of Peru. His primary patron was Bishop Manuel de Mollinedo. His work combined the parallel influences of Peru and Spain and is characterized by its dynamic composition, lavish decoration, and large scale.

Initially art historians believed Basilio Santa Cruz to be a Spanish friar, but historian Jorge Cornejo Bouroncle discovered contracts commissioning paintings from the artist, revealed that he was Basilio de Santa Cruz Pumacallao, with a distinctly Quechua surname, confirming his identity as an Indian.

== Style ==
His style is highly distinct from that of contemporary artist Diego Quispe Tito, because it is not based specifically on engravings imported from Europe but also paintings by Spanish artists. This influence can be attributed to the artworks that the Bishop Mollinedo brought back from Madrid. His studio created an extensive series of paintings depicted the life of St. Francis.

== Collections ==
Santa Cruz's artwork can be seen at the Cathedral of Cusco. In its basilica are two enormous paintings by him, featuring Saint Christopher's Apotheosis and Saint Isidore, respectively. Past the transept hang two more of Santa Cruz's large canvases, the "Chasuble Imposition to Saint Ildephonsus" and "The Ecstasy of Saint Philip Neri." A final piece of his work hangs in the Chapel of Saint Joseph. It is entitled, "Royal Saint Mary of Almudena", portraying a Virgin widely revered in Spain. The cathedral also owns his monumental oil paintings, Charles II and the Queen of Spain Adoring the Virgin of Almudena and Virgin of Bethlehem with Bishop Mollinedo.

His work also still stands in Convento de San Francisco del Cusco (Church and Convent of San Francisco, Cuzco) and includes "Series of the life of Saint Francis", in which only the last picture is signed by the artist. It is dated 1667. The Iglesia de la Merced has Santa Cruz's "Martyrdom of Saint Laurence", a painting with angels in the style of Spanish painter Bartolomé Esteban Murillo. Basilio Santa Cruz de Pumacallao created iconographies of arcabuceros, that is, angels with muzzle-loaded firearms, so characteristic of the Cuzco School and so different from the angels imagined in Europe at the same time.

Corpus Christi Procession in Cuzco, a late 17th-century oil on canvas painting in the collection of the Museo Arzobispol del Arte Religioso, has been attributed to him.
