= Angelino Medoro =

Italian painter (1567–1631)

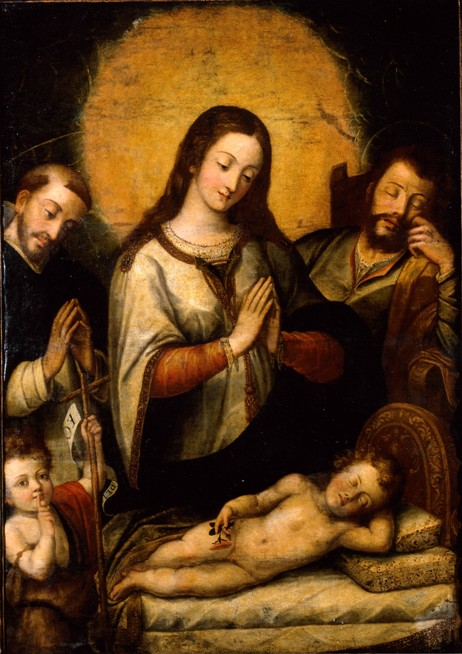
Holy Family with Saint John the Baptist and a Dominican Saint (1622), by Angelino Medoro, Museum of Fine Arts of Seville

Angelino Medoro (1567–1631) was an Italian painter, active in Latin America. His work in the Viceroyalty of Peru was greatly influential on Cuzco School art movement.

== Biography ==
Angelino Medoro was born in 1567 in present-day Italy, however there is conflicting information on the city of birth. He was born in either Rome, which was part of Papal States during this time; or Naples, which was part of the Kingdom of Sicily. Medoro is thought to have studied art in Rome, followed by travelled to Seville, and to New Kingdom of Granada (present-day Colombia). His only surviving artwork in Europe was the painting "Flagellation of Christ" (1586) in Seville, but in Peru and Colombia about 25 works painted by him have been preserved, due to its protection.

Medoro, alongside Bernardo Bitti, and Matteo da Lecce (or Matteo Pérez de Alesio in Spanish) were the three founders of Peruvian colonial painting. His earliest work in the Americas was Virgen de la Antigua (1587–1588) in the Santo Domingo church in Bogotá. In 1617, he painted a portrait of Saint Rosa of Lima at Santuario Santa Rosa de Lima (also known as Church of Santa Rosa in Lima).

His students included Pedro de Loayza (or Pedro Loayza), Luis de Riaño, and Juan de Mesa.

Medoro returned to Spain after 1620, and died in Seville in 1631.

== See also ==
- Pedro Bedón
- Spanish colonization of the Americas
