= Sinchi =

Sinchi or Sinchis may refer to:

- Sinchis, a police battalion during the 1981 internal conflict in Peru
- Sinchi Amazonic Institute of Scientific Research, a Colombian research institute
- Sinchi FC, a soccer club from China
- Sinchi Roca, 13th-century Incan Emperor

== See also ==
- Antonio Sinchi Roca Inka, 17th-century Quechua painter
