= Cusco school =

Roman Catholic art movement from Cusco, Peru

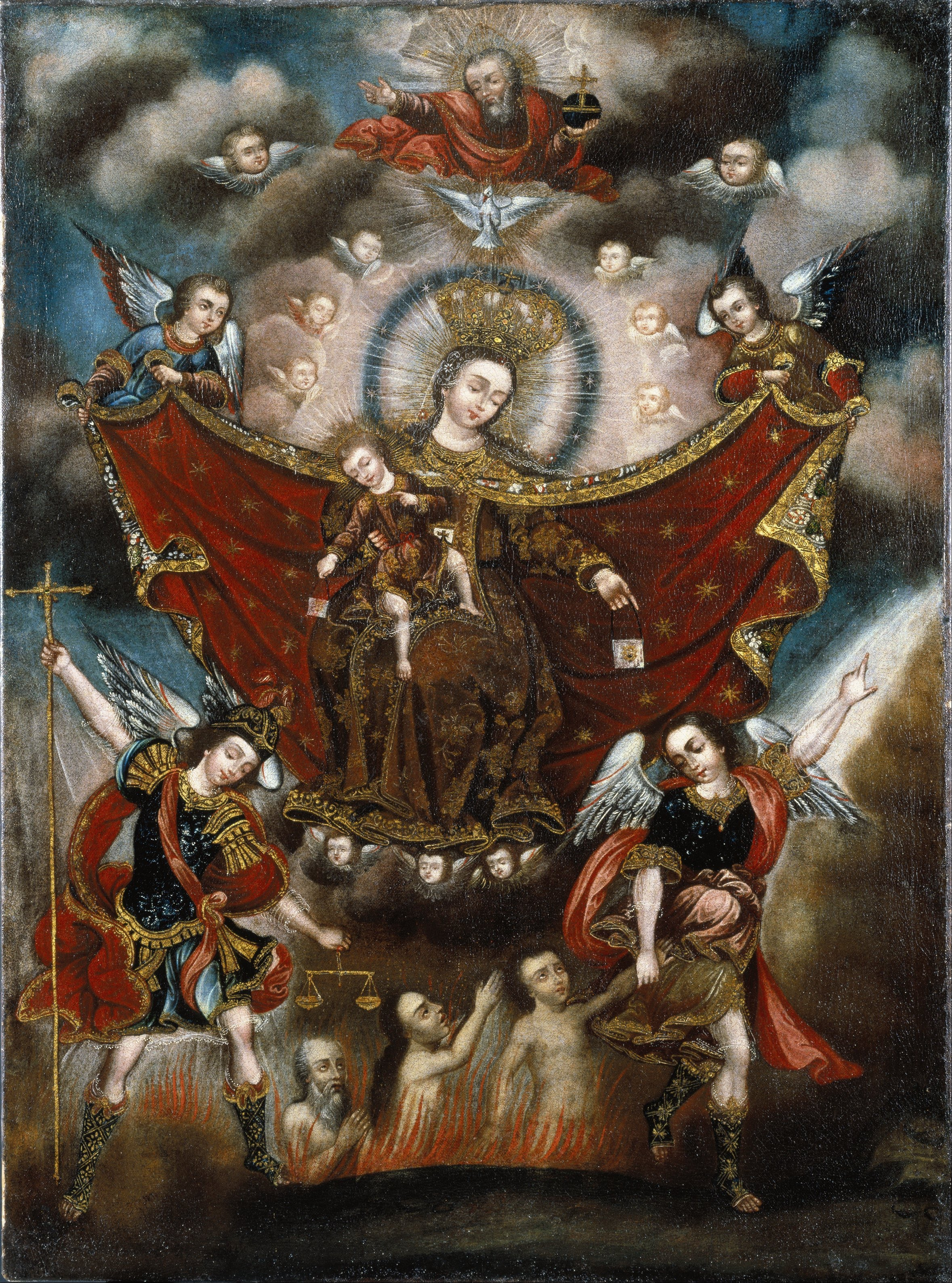
Virgin of Carmel Saving Souls in Purgatory, Circle of Diego Quispe Tito, 17th century, collection of the Brooklyn Museum

The Cusco school (escuela cuzqueña) or Cuzco school, was a Roman Catholic artistic tradition based in Cusco, Peru (the former capital of the Inca Empire) during the Colonial period, in the 16th, 17th and 18th centuries. It was not limited to Cusco only, but spread to other cities in the Andes, as well as to present day Ecuador and Bolivia.

Many colonial Cusco school paintings are preserved, most of them currently at Cusco, but also in other areas of Peru, the town of Calamarca (Bolivia) and in museums of Brazil, United States and England.

== History ==
The tradition originated after the 1534 Spanish conquest of Peru, and it is considered the first artistic center that systematically taught European artistic techniques in the Americas. The Spanish contribution, and in general European, to the Cusco school of painting, is given from very early time, when the construction of the Cathedral of Cusco begins. However, it is the arrival of the Italian painter Bernardo Bitti in 1583, that marks a beginning of the development of Cuzqueño art. The Jesuit introduced in Cusco one of the fashionable currents in Europe of the time, Mannerism, whose main characteristics were the treatment of figures in a somewhat elongated way, with the light focused on them.

During his two stays in Cusco, Bitti was commissioned to make the main altarpiece of the church of his Order, replaced by another after the earthquake, and painted some masterpieces, such as The Coronation of the Virgin, currently in the museum of the church of La Merced, and the Virgen del pajarito, in the cathedral.

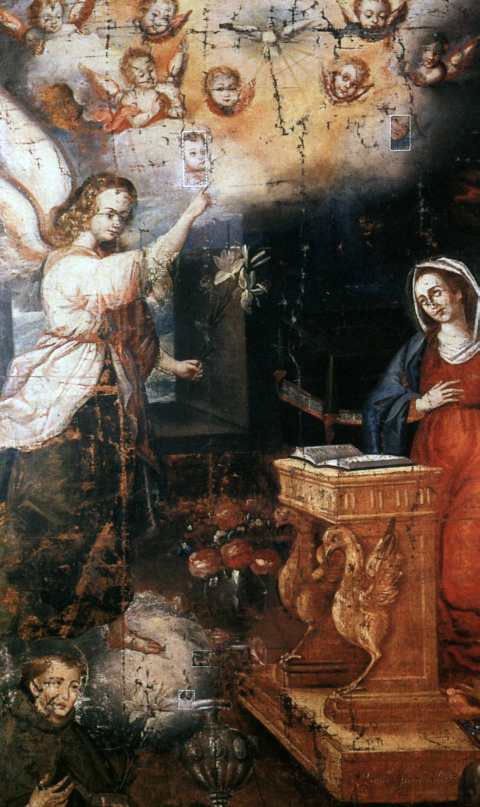
The Annunciation of the Virgin, painting by Luis de Riaño of 1632. Disciple in Lima of the Italian Angelino Medoro, Riaño was installed at Cusco to 1630, where his techniques and themes were very influential. Painting located at Museo Pedro de Osma de Barranco, Lima

Another of the great exponents of Cusqueño mannerism is the painter Luis de Riaño, born in Lima and a disciple of Italian artist Angelino Medoro. In the words of the Bolivian historians José de Mesa and Teresa Gisbert, authors of the most complete history of Cuzqueño Art, Riaño lords in the local artistic environment between 1618 and 1640, leaving among other works, the murals of the church of Andahuaylillas. Another standout in these first decades of the 17th century is the muralist Diego Cusihuamán, with works in the churches of Chinchero and Urcos.

The presence of Baroque style in Cuzqueña painting is mainly the result of the influence of tenebrism through the work of Francisco de Zurbarán and through inspiration from engravings of Flemish art from Antwerp. Marcos Ribera, born in Cusco in 1630, is the major exponent of this tendency. Five pieces of apostles by him can be seen in the church of San Pedro, two in the altarpiece and another in a side reredos. The monastery of Santa Catalina of Arequipa keeps La Piedad, and that of St. Francis, some of the canvases that illustrate the life of the founder of the Order, belonging to various authors.

The increasing activity of Amerindian-Quechua and Mestizo painters towards the end of the 17th century, makes the term Cusco school conform more strictly to this artistic movement. This painting is "Cuzqueña", not only because it comes from the hands of local artists, but mainly because it moves away from the influence of the predominant trends in European art and follows its own path.

This new Cuzqueño art is characterized thematically by the interest in Costumbrista subjects such as the procession of Corpus Christi, and by the presence for the first time of Andean flora and fauna. A series of portraits of Amerindian caciques and genealogical and heraldic paintings also appear. As for the technical treatment, there is a misunderstanding of the perspective added to a fragmentation of the space in several concurrent spaces or compartmentalized scenes. New chromatic solutions, with a predilection for intense colors, are another typical feature of the nascent pictorial style.

An event which occurred at the end of the 17th century, was decisive for the direction taken by Cuzqueña painting. In 1688, after continuous conflicts, there was a rupture in the corporation of painters that ended with the removal of the Amerindian-Quechua and Mestizo painters due, according to them, to the exploitation they were subjected by their Spanish colleagues. From this moment, free of the impositions of the corporation, the Amerindian and Mestizo artists were guided by their own sensibility and transfer to the canvas their mentality and their way of conceiving the world.

The most famous series of the Cuzco school is undoubtedly that of the sixteen paintings of the Corpus Christi series, which originally were in the church of Santa Ana and are now in the Museum of Religious Art of the Archbishopric of Cusco, except for three that are in Chile. From an anonymous painter of the late-17th century (some researchers attribute them to the workshops of Diego Quispe Tito and Pumacallao), these canvases are considered true masterpieces because of the richness of their color, the quality of the drawing and how well they achieved the portraits of the main characters of each scene. The series has enormous historical and ethnographic value, because it shows in detail the various social strata of Colonial Cusco, as well as many other elements of a festival that already was central in the life of the city.

The most original and important Amerindian painter is Diego Quispe Tito, born in the parish of San Sebastián, near to Cusco, in 1611 and active almost until end the century. It is in the work of Diego Quispe Tito that some of the characteristics of Cuzqueña painting are prefigured, such as a certain freedom in the handling of perspective, a previously unknown role of the landscape and the abundance of birds in the leafy trees that are part of the same. The motif of the birds, especially the Amazon forest's parrot, is interpreted by some researchers to refer to the Inca nobility.

The most valuable part of Quispe Tito's work is located in the church of his native town, San Sebastián. One highlight is the series of twelve compositions on the life of St. John the Baptist, in the main nave of the church. Of great mastery are also the two enormous canvases dedicated to Saint Sebastian, that of the asaetamiento and that of the death of the saint. Also famous is the series of the Zodiac that the artist painted for the Cathedral of Cuzco towards 1680.

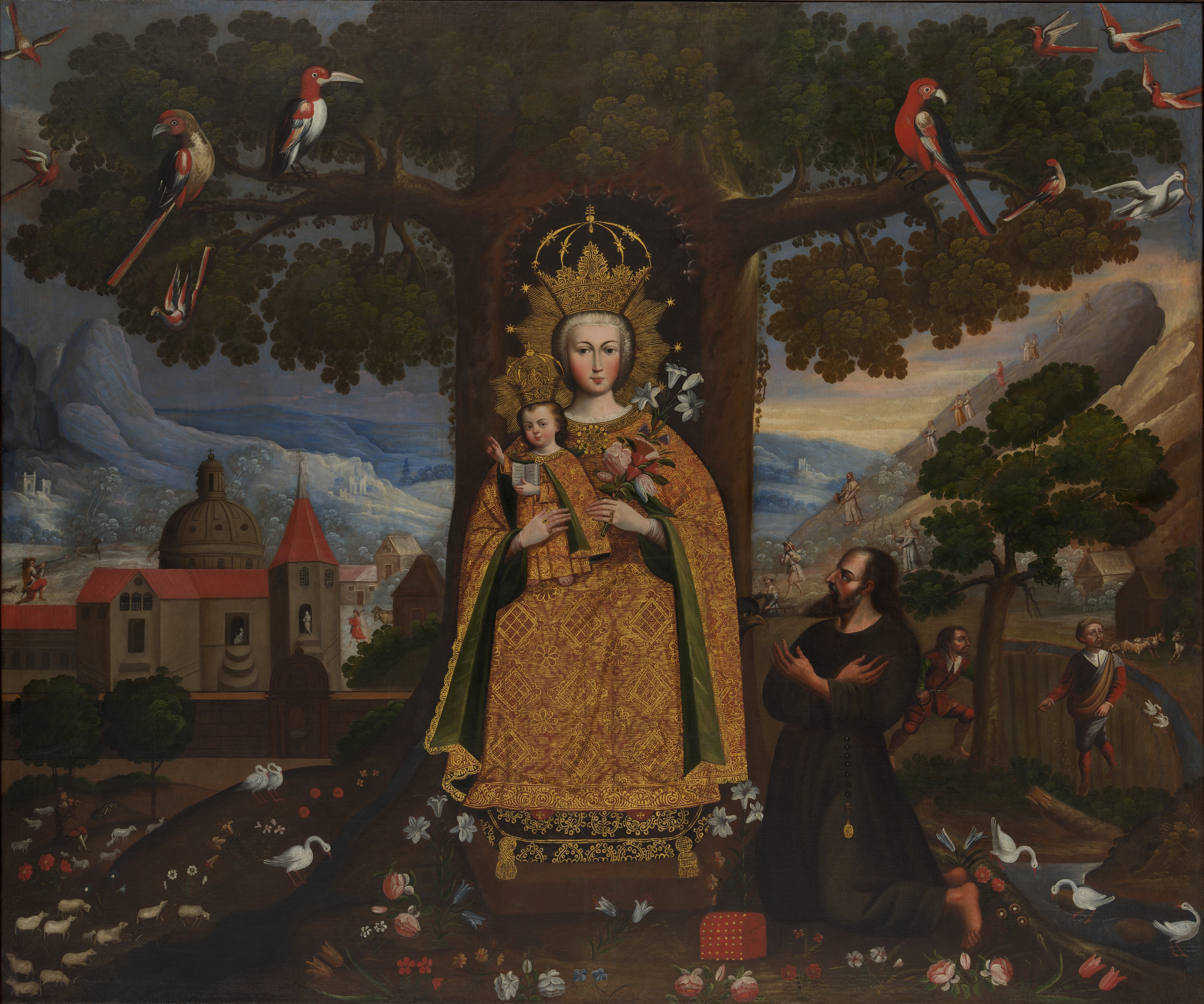
Our Lady of Valvanera, c. 1770–80, Metropolitan Museum of Art

Another outstanding painter of the Cusco school is Basilio Santa Cruz Pumacallao, of indigenous ancestry like Quispe Tito, but unlike him, much more attached to the canons of Western painting within the Baroque current. Active in the second half of the 17th century, Santa Cruz leaves the best of his work in the Cathedral of Cusco, as he was commissioned to decorate the walls on the side of the choir and the arms of the transept. In the picture of the Virgin of Bethelem, located in the choir, there is a portrait of the bishop and patron Manuel de Mollinedo y Angulo who helped the development of the Cusco Painting School and the city.

Such is the fame reached by the Cusqueña painting of the 17th century, which during the following century produces a singular phenomenon that curiously left its mark not only in art but in the local economy. Industrial workshops made canvases in large quantities for merchants who would sell these works in cities such as Trujillo, Ayacucho, Arequipa and Lima, or even in much more distant places, in the current Argentina, Chile and Bolivia. The painter Mauricio García, active towards the mid-18th century, for example, signed a contract to deliver about five hundred canvases in seven months. This was what was known as "ordinary" painting to differentiate it from the painting of fine brocateado, with a much more elaborate and colorful design.

The most important artist of the 18th century is Marcos Zapata. His pictorial output, which spans more than 200 paintings, ranges between 1748 and 1764. The best are the fifty large canvases that cover the high arches of the Cathedral of Cusco and that are characterized by the abundance of flora and fauna as a decorative element.

== Authors ==
The Cuzqueña paintings were a form of religious art whose main purpose was didactic. The Spanish, who aimed to convert the Incas to Catholicism, sent a group of religious artists to Cusco. These artists formed a school for Quechua people and Mestizos, teaching them drawing and oil painting. The designation "Cusqueña," however, is not limited to the city of Cusco or to indigenous artists, as White Criollo artists participated in the tradition as well.

A major patron of the Cuzco artists was Bishop Manuel de Mollinedo y Angulo, who collected European art and made his collection available to Peruvian artists. He promoted and financially assisted such Cusqueña artists such as Basilio Santa Cruz Pumacallao, Antonio Sinchi Roca Inka, and Marcos Rivera.

== Style ==
The defining characteristics of the Cusqueña style are believed to have originated in the art of Quechua painter Diego Quispe Tito.

Cusqueña paintings are characterized by their use of exclusively religious subjects, their lack of perspective, and the predominance of red, yellow and earth colors. They are also remarkable for their lavish use of gold leaf, especially with images of the Virgin Mary. Though the Cusqueño painters were familiar with prints of Byzantine, Flemish and Italian Renaissance art, their works were freer than those of their European tutors; they used bright colors and distorted, dramatic images. They often adapted the topics to depict their native flora and fauna as a backdrop in their works.

Warrior angels became a popular motif in Cusqueña paintings.

Most Cusqueña paintings were created anonymously because of Pre-Columbian traditions that define art as communal. An exception is one of the last members of the Cuzco school, Marcos Zapata (c. 1710–1773). Other known artists of the Cuzco school include Diego Cusihuamán, Gregorio Gamarra, Basilio Santa Cruz Pumacallao (1635–1710), and Antonio Sinchi Roca Inka. Related to the school is the Master of Calamarca, active in the 18th century in Bolivia.

== Collections ==
The largest collection of paintings from the Cusco school is in the Cusco Cathedral. The Lima Art Museum and the Inca Museum also house important collections.

A large quantity of Cusco school paintings remain from Colonial times. In recent years there has been a significant increase in demand from both Latin American art collectors and certain museums for paintings from the Cusco school period. In 2010, the American government repatriated two Cusco and Lima style paintings to Peru that had been illegally brought into the United States in 2005.

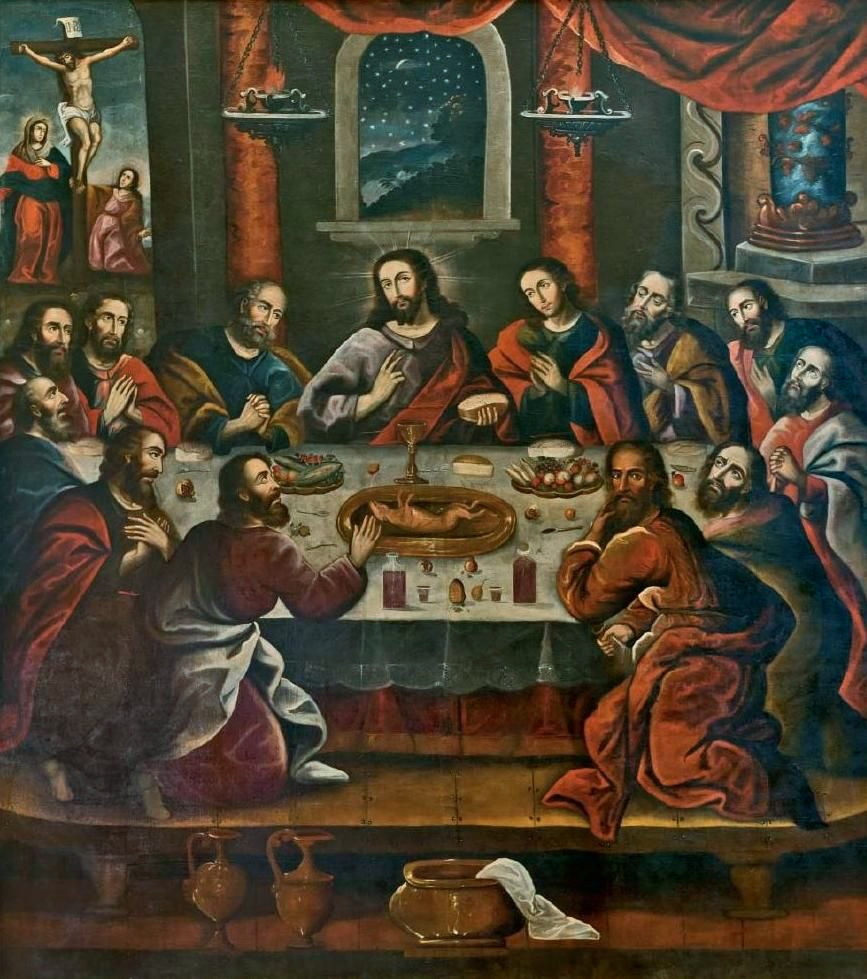
The Last Supper, 1753, by Marcos Zapata, in the Cuzco Cathedral. The festive animal to be consumed is a guinea pig.

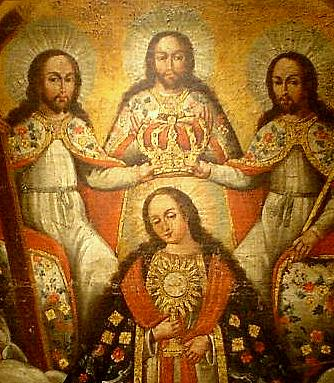
Rare painting showing Jesus Christ figure for three times, representing the sacred trinity, 16th century, private collection - Brazil

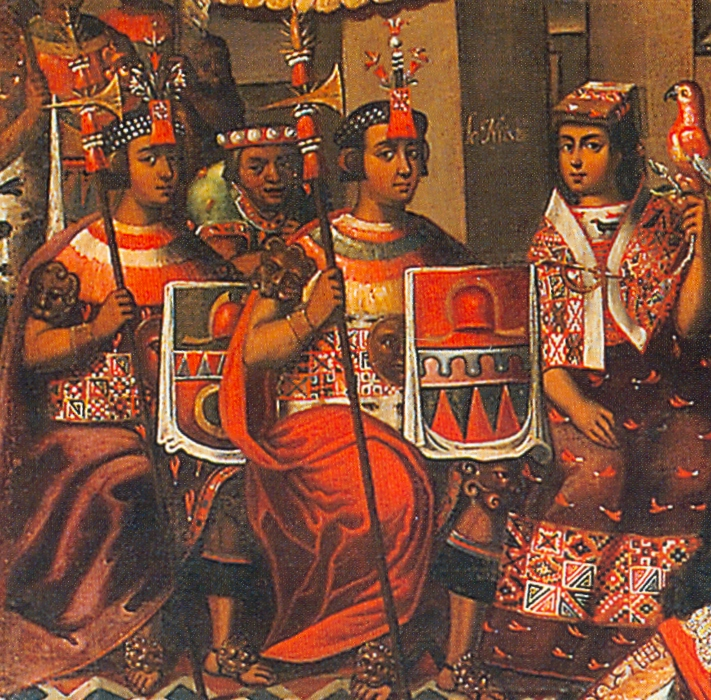
The Marriage of Captain Martin de Loyola to Beatriz Ñusta, detail, c. 1675-1690, Church of la Compañía de Jesús, Cusco

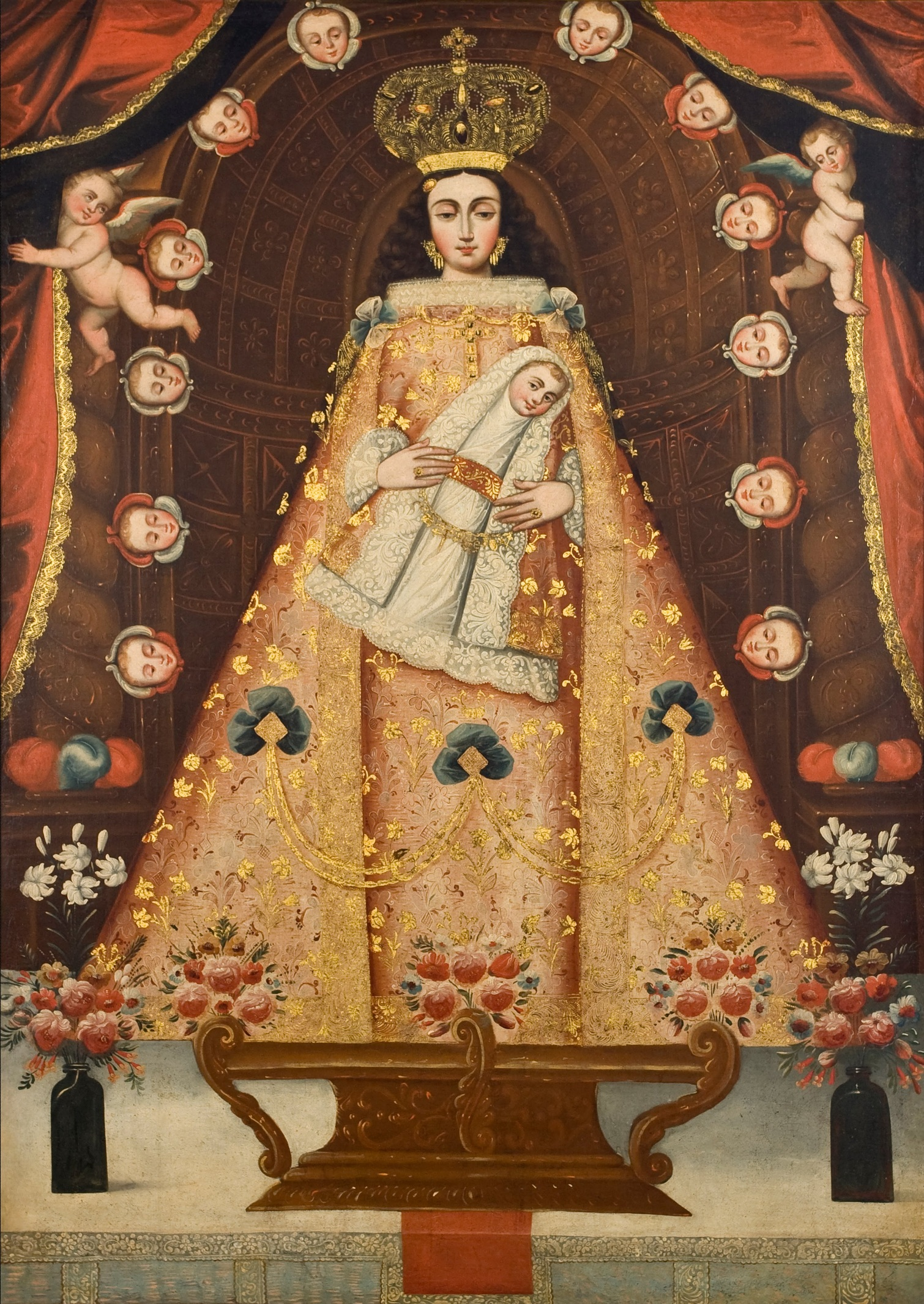
Our Lady of Bethelem, anonymous, 18th century

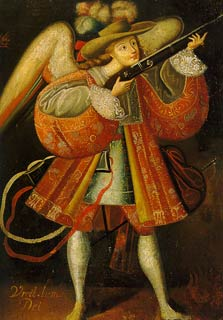
Archangel Uriel, anonymous, 18th century

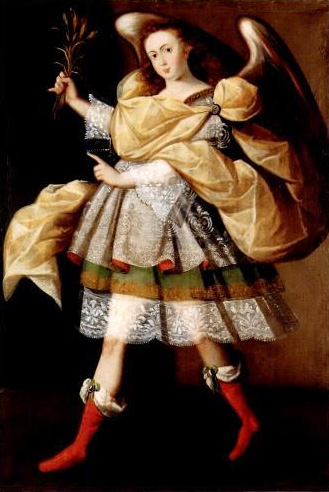
Master of Calamarca, Angel with wheat stalks from the church of Calamarca

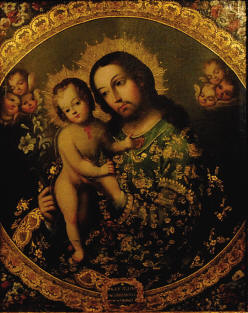
St. Joseph with Child, anonymous, oil on canvas, 40.5" x 32.2", 18th century

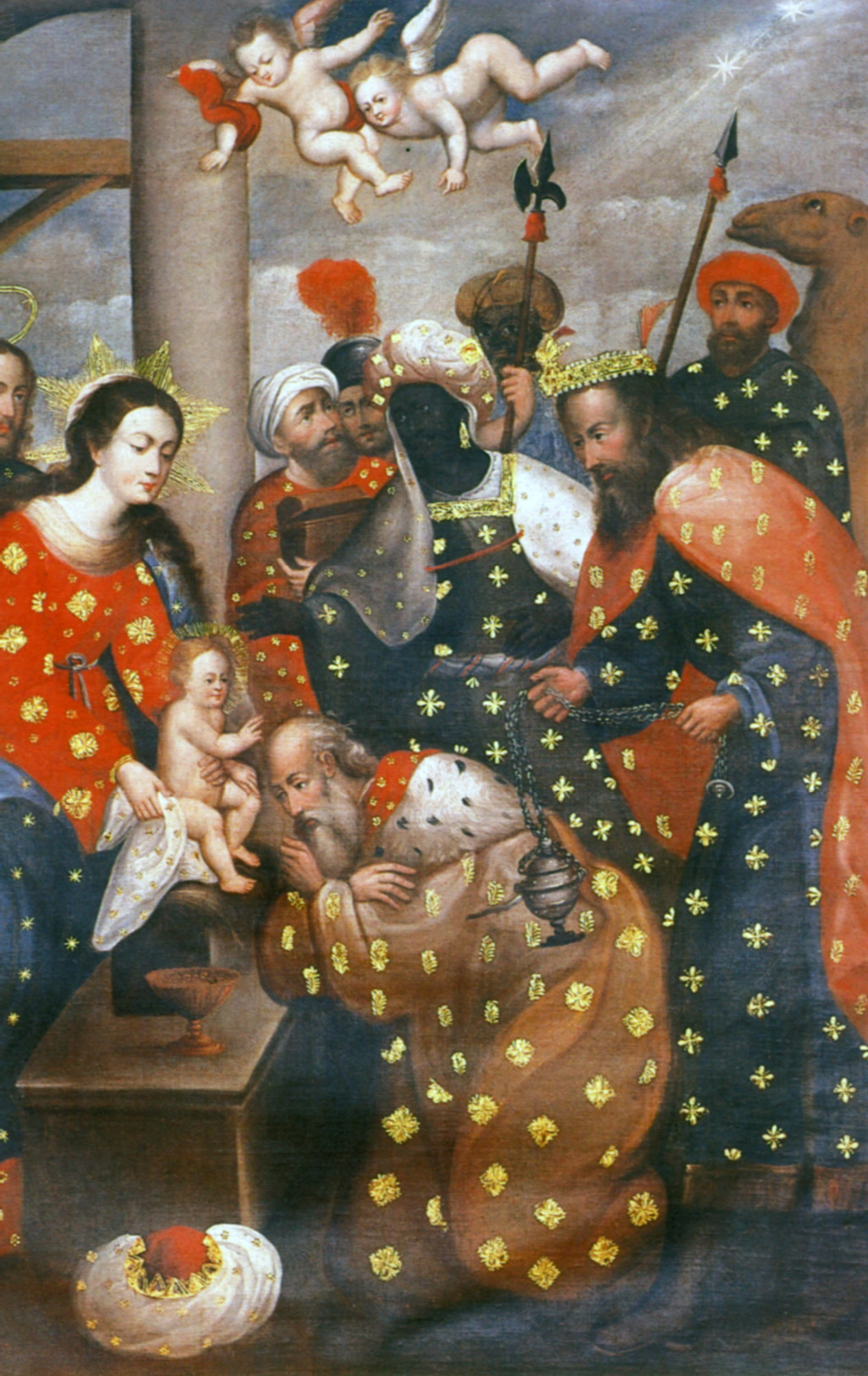
The Adoration of the Magi, anonymous, c. 1740-1760

Adoration of the shepherds, anonymous, 18th century

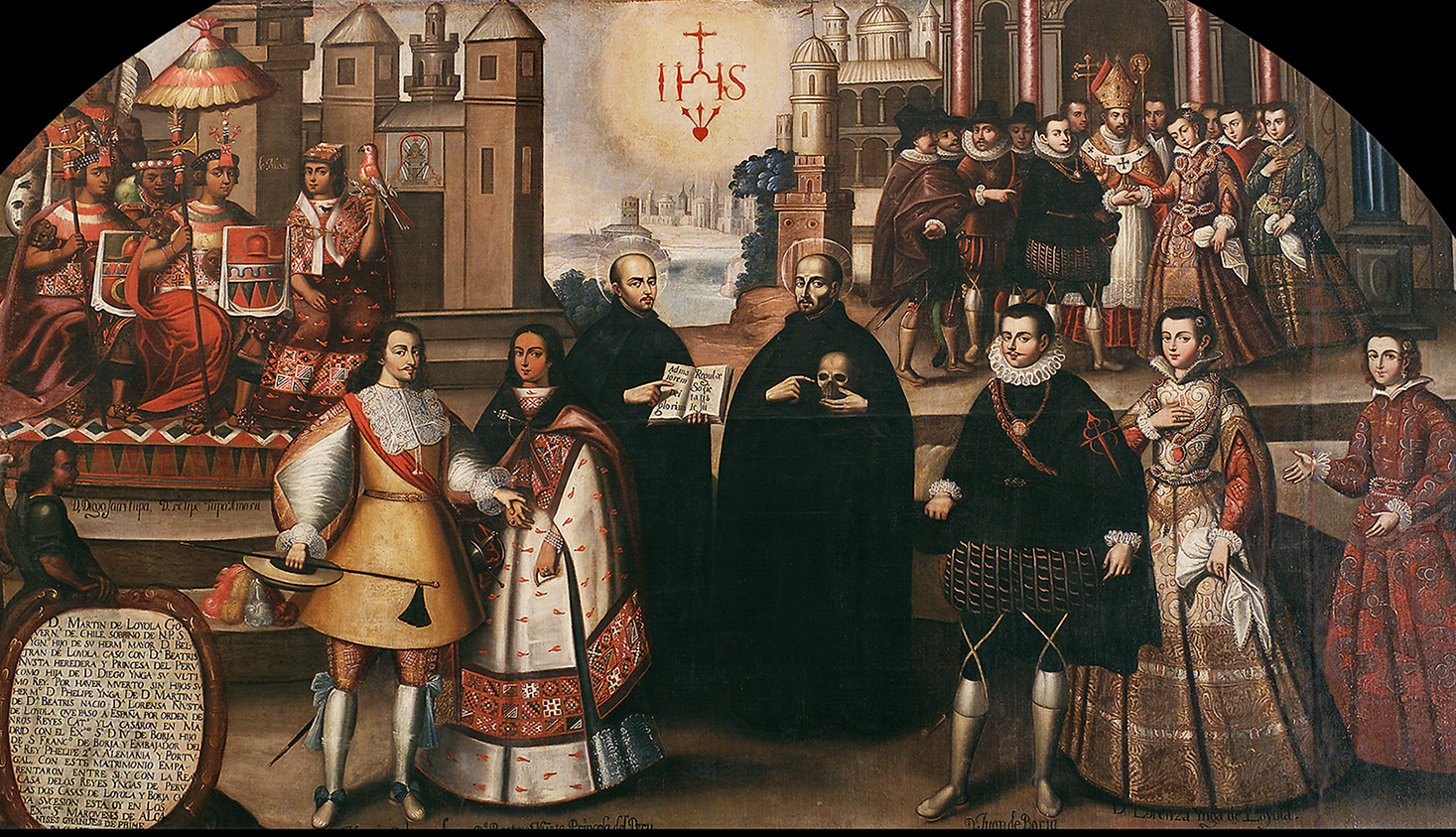
The Marriage of Captain Martín García de Loyola and the Inca ñusta Beatriz Clara Qoya, daughter of Sayri Túpac; parents of the first Marchioness of Oropesa. 17th century painting located in the Church of la Compañía de Jesús, Cusco.

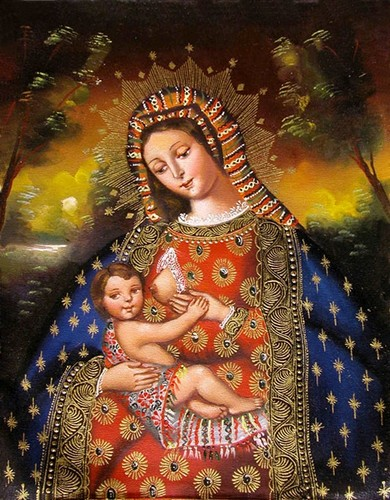
Nursing Madonna, Colonial Cusco Painting

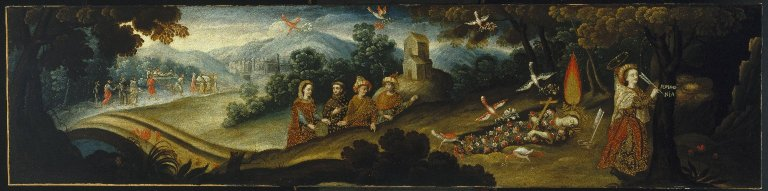
The Legend of Santa Sophronia, circle of Diego Quispe Tito, 2nd half of the 17th century (Brooklyn Museum of Art)

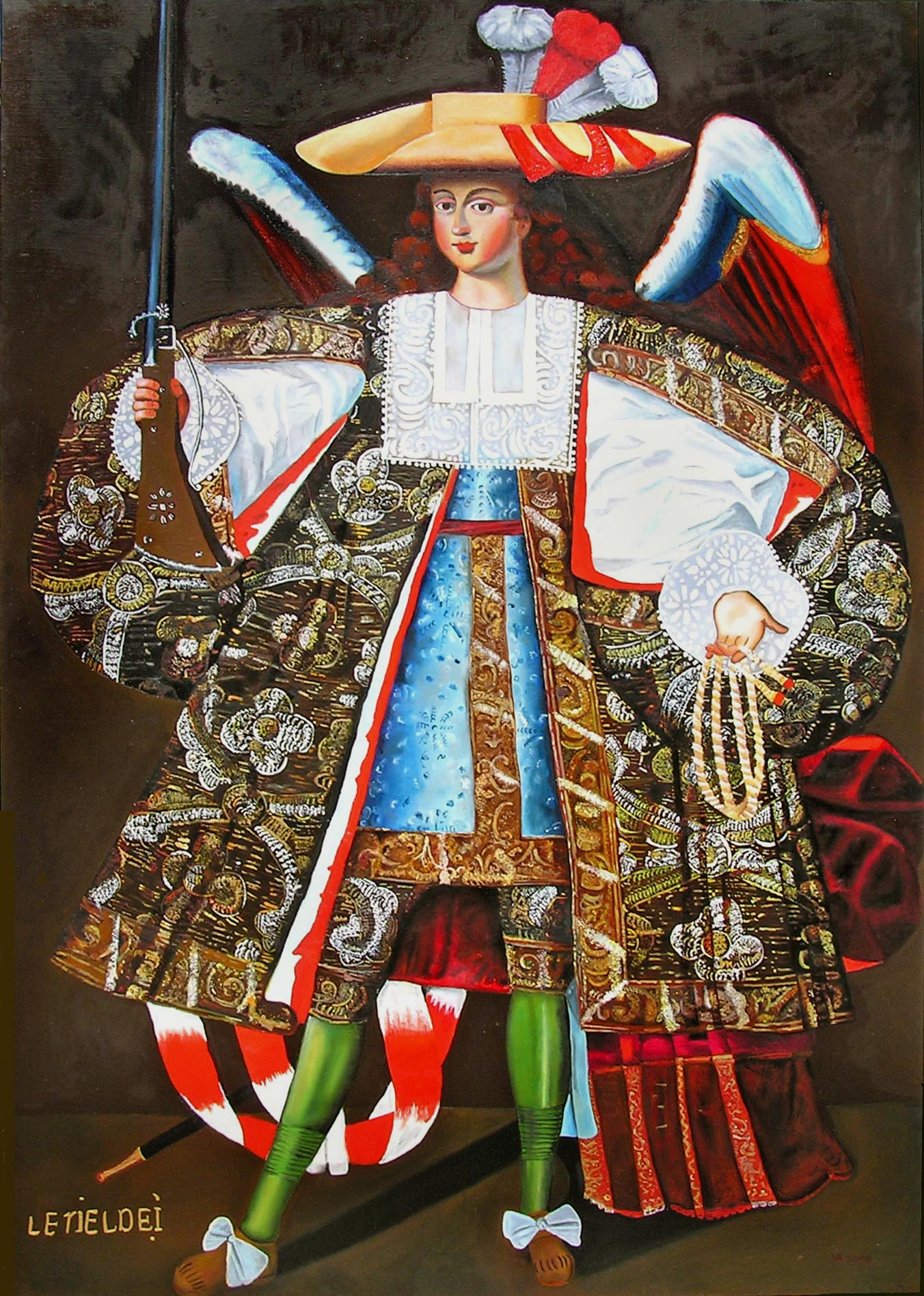
Example of Bolivian painting (part of the Cusco school): an Arquebusier Angel; by Master of Calamarca; 17th century

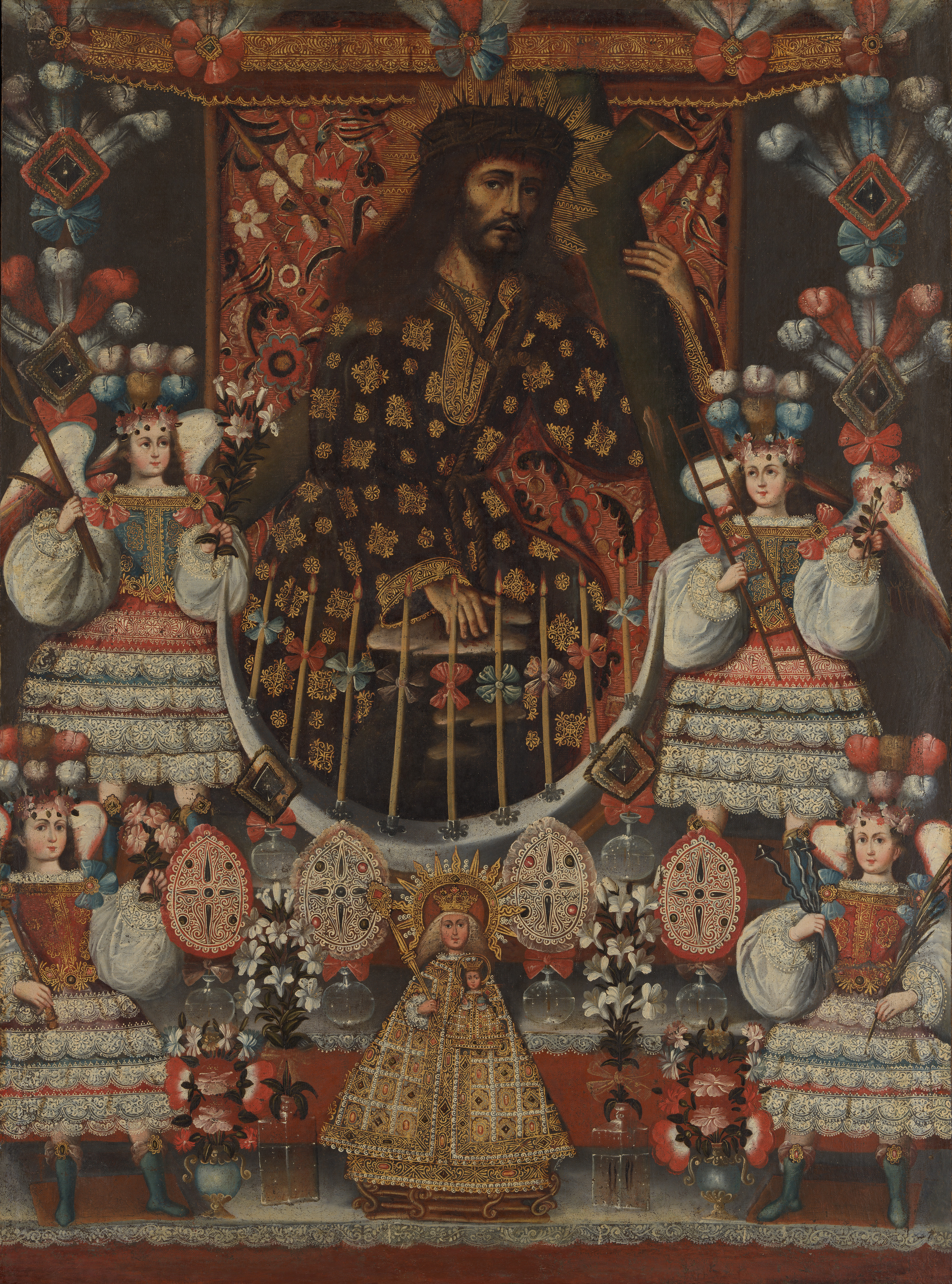
Christ Carrying the Cross, called "The Lord of the Fall", made in Cusco, ca. 1770–75, at the Metropolitan Museum of Art.

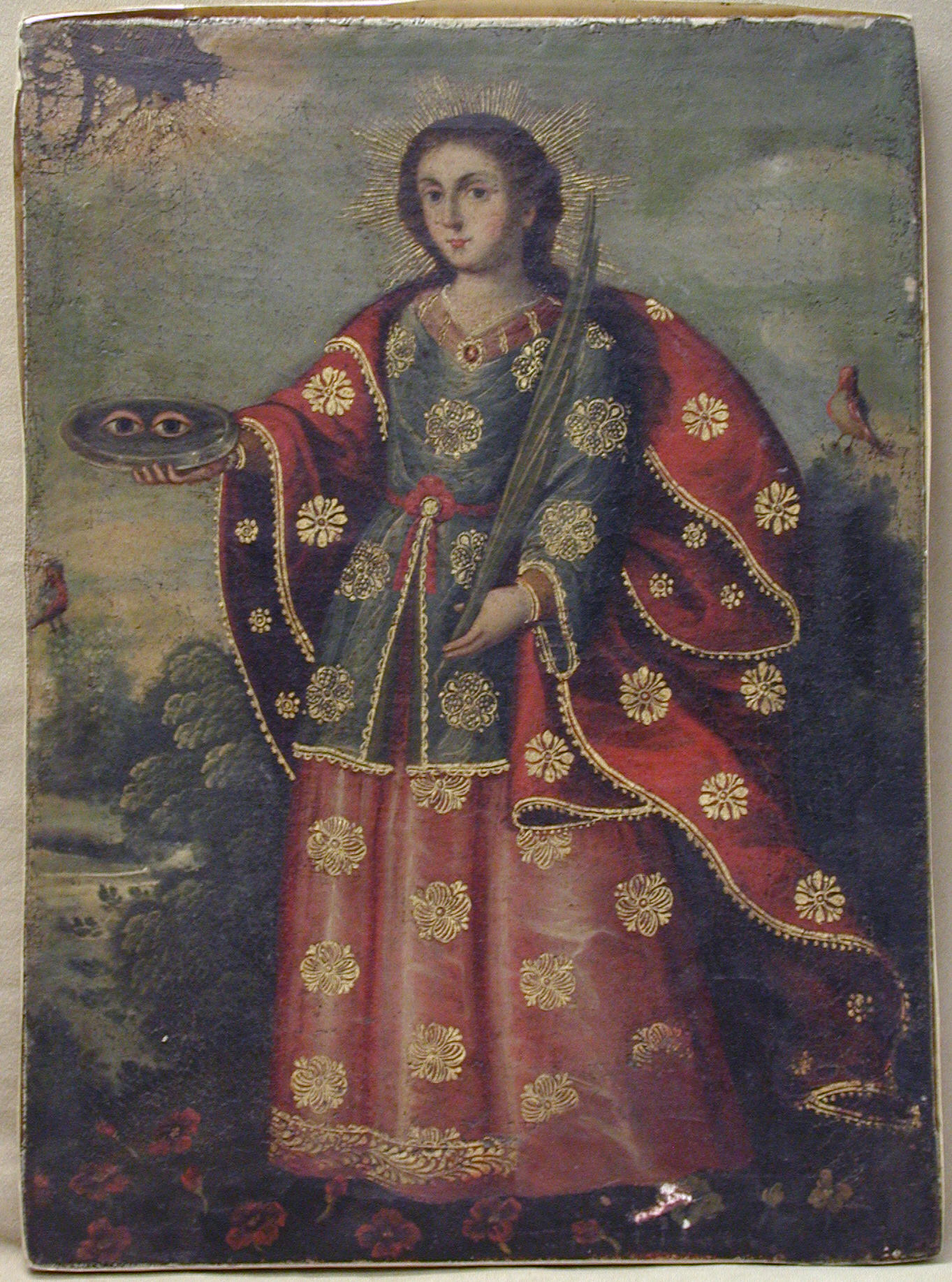
Saint Lucy, Metropolitan Museum of Art

== Cuzco school artists ==
- Luis de Riaño 1596 — c. 1667, Peru
- Basilio de Santa Cruz Pumacallao, 1635–1710, Peru
- Antonio Sinchi Roca Inka, 17th century, Peru
- Diego Cusi Huamán, 17th century, Peru
- Diego Quispe Tito, 1611–1681, Peru
- Marcos Zapata, c. 1710–1773, Peru
- Master of Calamarca, 18th century, Bolivia

== Modern interpretations ==
The nationally recognized "Vírgenes Urbanas" project aims to recreate the paintings of the Cusco school replacing the figures with Indigenous people, as well as Indigenous angels, Virgin Marys and saints like Rose of Lima with new Indigenous faces in order to represent the Peruvian population. In addition to the paintings, artists do Indigenous photo montages on recreations of the paintings. According to them, the Cusco school is a symbol of the power of the colonizer "representing images with Caucasian features, imposing ideas, religion and Western stereotypes" and the project re-poses them with new signs that refer directly to the descendants of the former victims.

These new paintings are also exhibited in many museums throughout the country.

Throughout his life, the painter Ray Martìn Abeyta created works inspired by the Cusco school style of Madonna painting, creating a hybrid of traditional and contemporary Latino subject matter representing the colonialist encounters between Europeans and Mesoamericans.

Márcia Mendonça, a Brazilian friar who later came out as a transgender woman, was heavily influenced by the Cusco school in her own art, which can be seen at Catholic sites in her home state of Ceará, particularly in the Diocese of Limoeiro do Norte.

== Miscellaneous ==
Today Peruvian local artists paints replicas of Colonial Cusco paintings that sell to tourists.

== See also ==
- Ángeles arcabuceros
- Art of Latin America
- Art of Peru
- Latin American artists of indigenous descent
