= Diego Cusi Huamán =

Peruvian painter

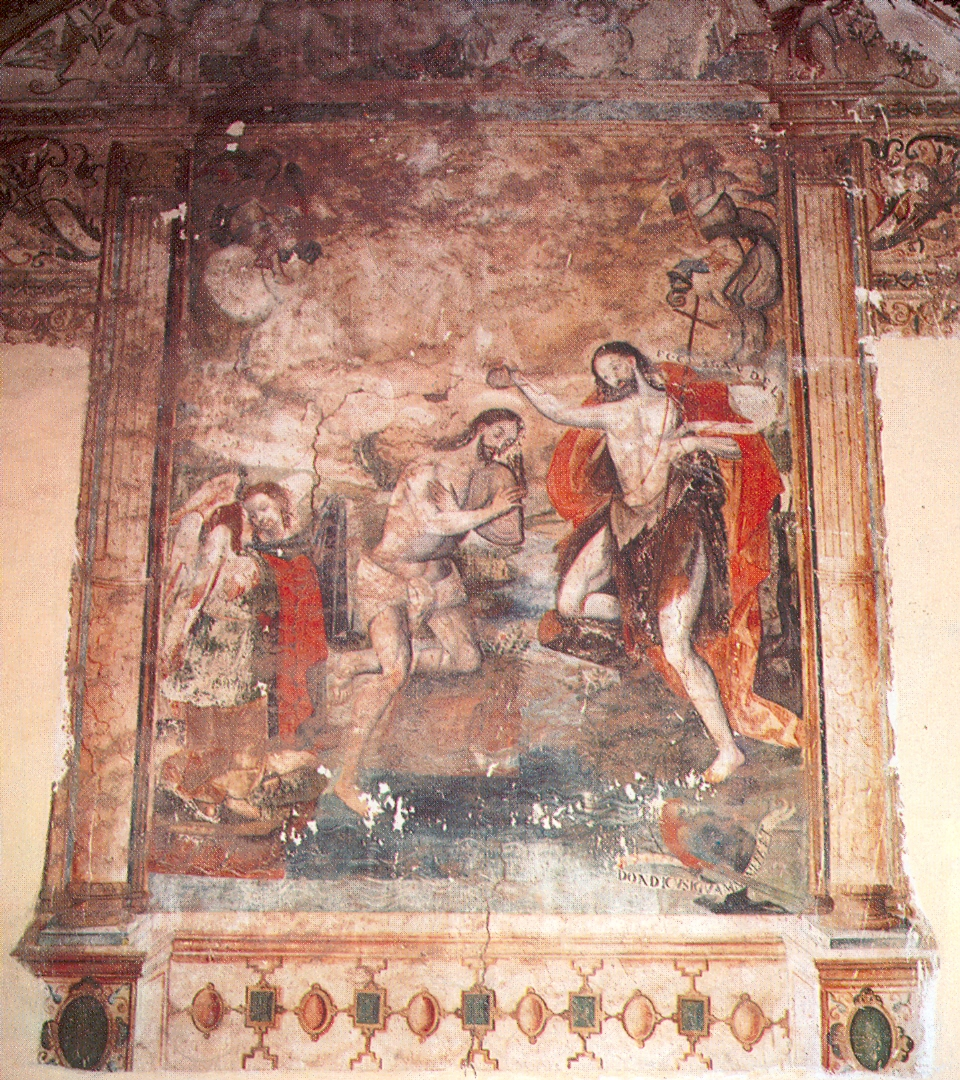
- "The Baptism of Christ" at Iglesia de Urcos, Cuzco, Peru
- Born: 16th century Cusco, Peru
- Other name: Diego Cusihuamán
- Occupations: Muralist, painter
- Movement: Cusco School

Diego Cusi Huamán was a Peruvian muralist and painter, active in the first decades of the 17th century and of the Cusco School art movement. He is considered one of the pioneers of colonial mural painting in Peru. His name is also spelled as Diego Cusihuamán.

He was indigenous and born in Cusco. Between 1603 and 1607 he worked in the presbytery of the Iglesia Colonial de Chinchero (English: Chinchero Colonial Church) commissioned by its parish priest, Mr. Mejía. The decoration includes a Coronation of the Virgin and a set of grotesques in the frieze and triumphal arch, in which the signature "by the hand of Don Diego" appears, identified with Cusi Huamán by Teresa Gisbert and José de Mesa due to the similarity of style with the other signed work, "The Baptism of Christ" from the Iglesia de Urcos in Cuzco, on which he worked somewhat later.
