= Ray Abeyta =

American artist

Ray Martìn Abeyta
- Ray Abeyta in Brooklyn, New York
- Born: November 13, 1956; Santa Cruz, New Mexico, U.S.
- Died: December 1, 2014 (aged 58); Brooklyn, New York, U.S.
- Education: BFA, University of New Mexico
- Known for: Painting
- Spouse: Alyssa Jill (Glantz) Abeyta
- Children: 2

Ray Martìn Abeyta (November 13, 1956 – December 1, 2014) was an American painter. His paintings are a hybrid of historical and contemporary Latino subject matter in the Cuzco School style of Madonna painting, lowrider culture, New Mexican traditional retablo painting, and representations of the colonialist encounters between Europeans and Mesoamericans.

== Early life ==
Abeyta grew up in the small village of Santa Cruz de la Cañada (population 423) near the town of Española, New Mexico. He is of Basque descent. As a child, his family lived in several trailers. He was raised in the lowrider culture of Northern New Mexico. He has been described as a "precocious child who drew constantly," and credited his father for providing him with the encouragement to draw as a means of communication starting at a young age. While Abeyta's father was on active duty in the U.S. Army, they would correspond with one another in drawings.

== Education ==
Abeyta received a bachelor's degree in fine arts from the University of New Mexico in 1982. His art professors sought to cultivate an abstract expressionist style of painting, however, Abeyta taught himself, through trial and error, illusionistic baroque lighting techniques to render the human figure.

== Personal life ==
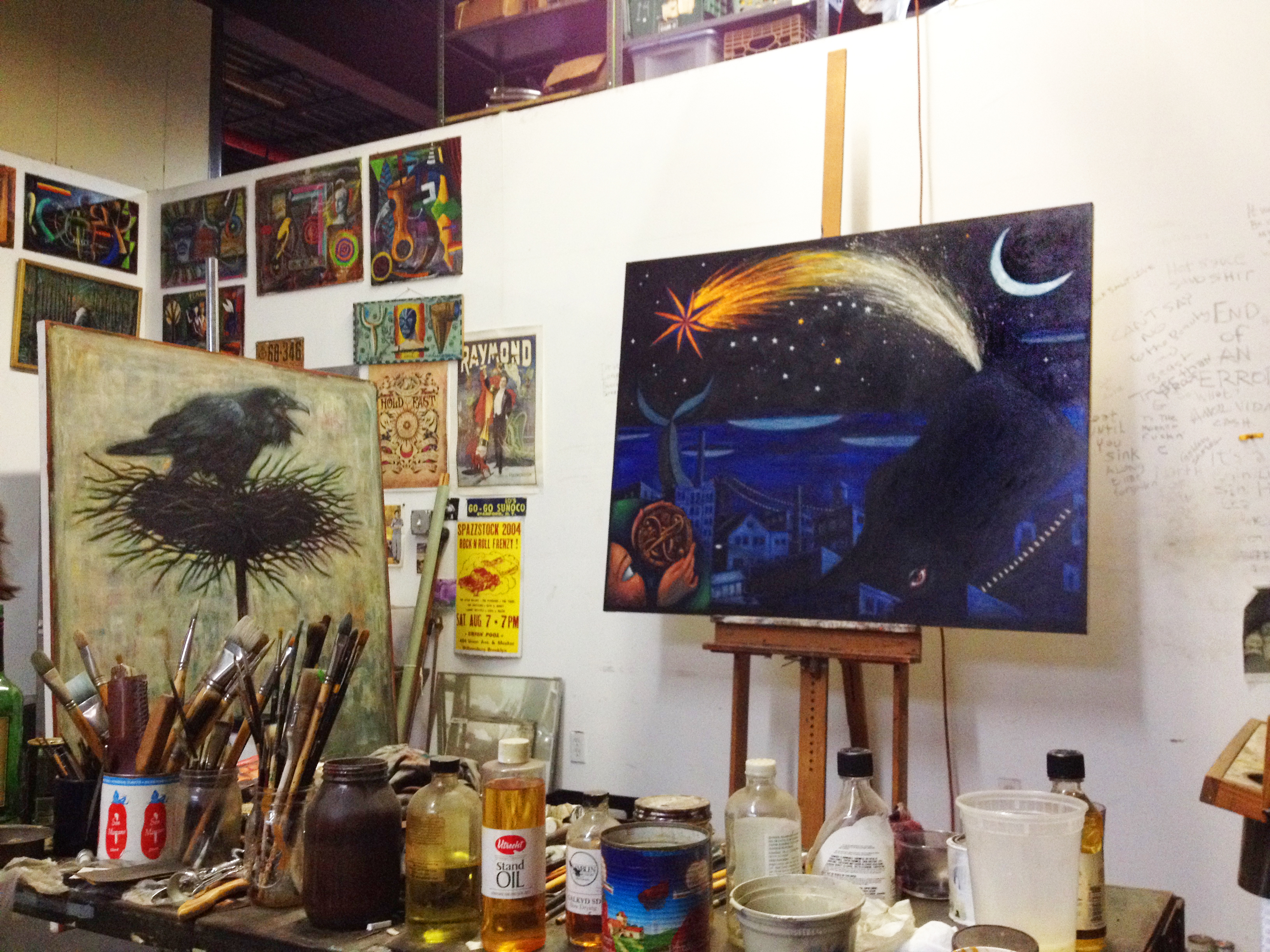
Work in progress in Ray Abeyta's studio, 2014

Abeyta moved from New Mexico to the East Village of New York city in 1986. Seeking more work space and lower rent, he settled into a warehouse studio in the North Williamsburg section of Brooklyn. In 1989 he met his future wife, Alyssa Jill Glantz (d. 2017), a business woman and community organizer from Manhattan, whom he married in 1992. They had two children, Elija and Izzy.

The couple was active in the North Brooklyn artist scene, and established the bar and entertainment venue Union Pool in Williamsburg, Brooklyn. They also co-founded the restaurant Hotel Delmano, as well as other venues in Greenpoint and Williamsburg.

Abeyta was affectionately known as the honorary Mayor of Williamsburg.

Abeyta was a classic car and vintage motorcycle enthusiast, and owned and restored a 1956 Ford F100 pickup truck and a 1968 Triumph motorcycle. He was the co-owner of Works Engineering, a vintage motorcycle repair, machining and detailing shop in Brooklyn.

Throughout his life, Abeyta remained close to his New Mexican roots, its history and culture.

== Professional career ==
The iconography of Abeyta's paintings has been described as a mixture of "colonial, baroque, indigenous and pop culture" references. Abeyta's work was the subject of numerous one person exhibitions, including major exhibitions at the Museum of New Mexico, and the National Hispanic Cultural Center Art Museum. His work is held in the permanent collections of these institutions.

His work was included in the exhibition, Painting the Divine: Images of Mary in the New World at the New Mexico History Museum. He was influenced by Spanish Baroque painting, Mexican retablo and ex voto paintings as well as other vernacular visual sources such as codexes, maps and nautical charts. His work has been included in numerous exhibitions, including the San Francisco Mexican Museum, the Rotunda Gallery (Brooklyn) among others.

== Themes ==
=== Hybrid cultures ===
Indios (Indians), 2002, by Ray Abeyta, photographed by Regan Vercruysse, collection of the Museum of New Mexico

The painting Indios (Indians), 2002, presents the viewers with two side-by-side cartouches that address the notion of mistranslation, a favorite theme of Abeyta. The painting refers to the mistaken belief that Columbus had reached the East Indies in Asia, when he actually reached North America. The painting questions the term, "indian." The artwork is in the style of an 18th-century religious painting similar to those of the highlands of Peru in Bolivia. In the left cartouche we see the Mesoamerican deity, Quetzalcoatl, and on the right, Shiva, the Hindu god of destruction and transformation is depicted. Abeyta has painted Quetzalcoatl with four eyes that resonate with Shiva's three eyes (two optical eyes and central third eye). Serpents ring his neck to reference wisdom and eternity. The painting intentionally misrepresents iconography to question cultural assumptions.

In the 1993 painting, Destilación (Distillation), the mystical, pre-modern scientific practice of alchemy is illustrated by a large alembic vessel. Rather than distilling lead into gold, Abeyta's retort presents a cocktail of "purified" culture. On the left, a white European noblewoman stares at the viewer, while an Aztec man wearing a feathered robe turns away, "as though declining the distilled beverage." In the foreground, a Black child holds a silver tray towards the noblewoman, representing "the forced importation of Africans into the New World" while a naked boy aims a bow and arrow at the European woman.

=== Literary references ===
Ray Abeyta, Hold Fast (2004), oil on canvas

In the painting Hold Fast (2004) Abeyta references Herman Melville's 1851 novel, Moby-Dick, with a portrait of the South Pacific harpooner, Queequeg, covered with Maori-like tattoos, with harpoon in hand and wearing a stovepipe hat, standing amid the gridwork of a nautical map. As the only crew member of Captain Ahab's ship, Pequod, to survive the encounter with the whale, he appears "savage yet serene", unflappable among white society.

=== Pre-conquest Mesoamerican mythology ===
Abeyta created many paintings inspired by the mythology of the pre-Columbian era. The work, La Ofrenda del Espejo (The Offering of the Mirror) (1995) shows the downfall and humiliation of Quetzalcoatl, the feathered serpent god, by Tezcatlipoca, the smoking-mirror god, who tricks Quetzalcoatl by getting him drunk on pulque. Quetzalcoatl then mistakenly sleeps with his sister, causing disgrace. In a vignette within the painting, the drunken Quetzalcoatl wears a mask (la mascarilla) with European features, including pale skin and a blond beard.

=== Spanish colonialization of indigenous peoples ===
Numerous paintings depict historical or mythological events and figures from pre-conquest Mesoamerica, for example, the painting, La Ofrenda I, Tenochitlán (The Offering, Tenochitlán), depicting the pivotal moment of contact between the Aztec people and the Spanish conquistadors.

=== Vernacular culture of New Mexico ===
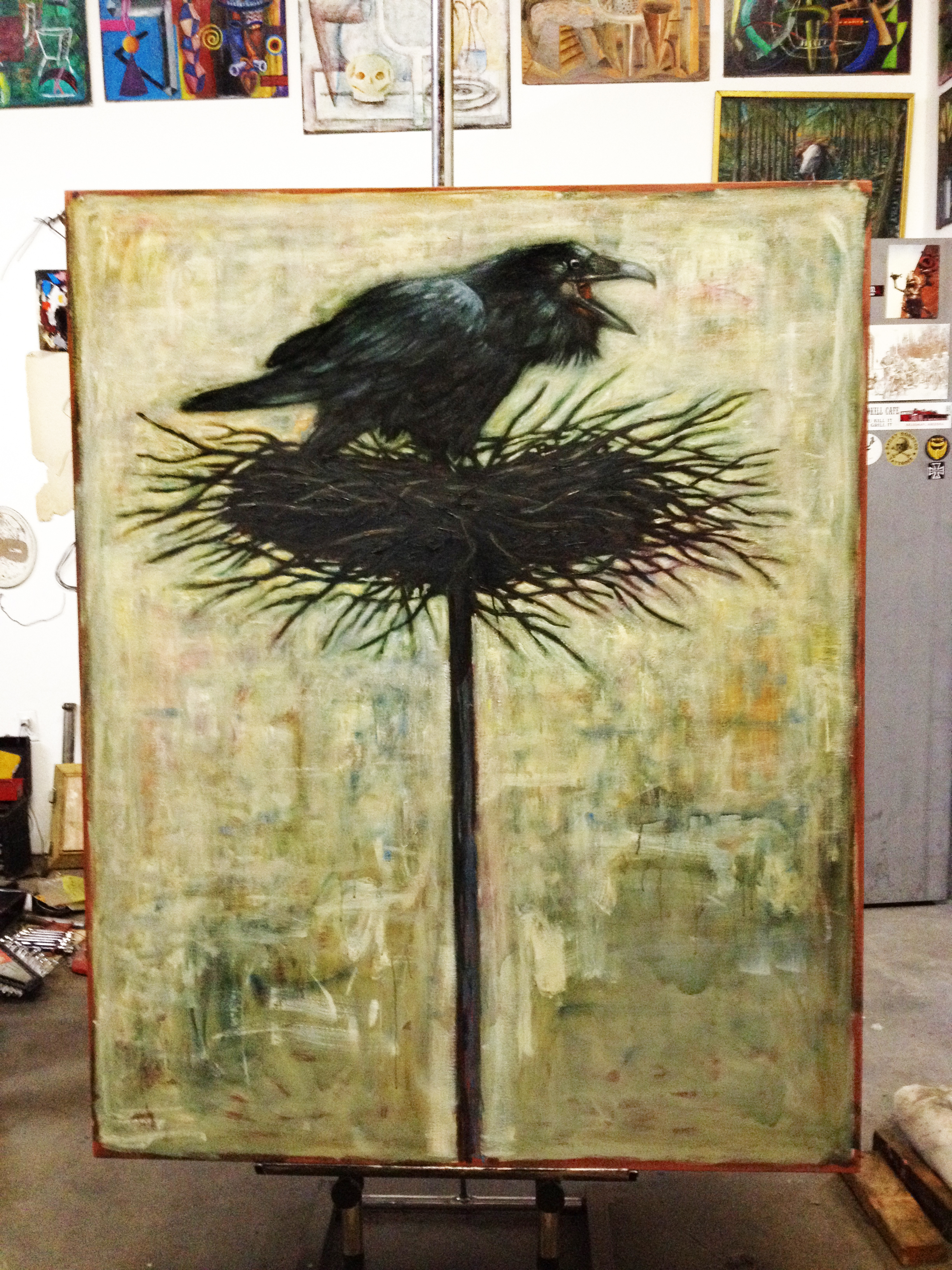
Work in progress in Ray Abeyta's studio, 2014

Many of Abeyta's paintings portray the vibrant vernacular culture of New Mexico, for example, Modelo (2002) showing three men and a woman standing around a red lowrider car; the sky is filled with ornate pinstriping similar to the decorative paint jobs on hot rod cars.

Abeyta's 2004 painting, Ofilia Y Lallorona (Ophelia and La Llarona) references the La Llorona folklore tale of a mysterious weeping woman dressed in white who appears as a nocturnal wanderer who then disappears into a lake. The tale, which was told to Abeyta as a child, is shared throughout the Southwestern U.S. and in Mexico, to frighten children into good behavior.

=== Sainthood and mysticism ===
In the painting, San Antonio (Saint Anthony) (1994), the Portuguese priest is depicted in a state of suspended animation, hovering upside-down above a hole in the ground. An empty pedestal is at Saint Antonio's side. The scene is surrounded by a pastoral setting of trees and foliage.

== Monograph ==
A monograph on his work, Cuentos y Encuentros (Tales and Encounters): Paintings by Ray Martìn Abeyta, was published in 2003 by the Museum of New Mexico Press.

== Collections ==
Abeyta's work is held in numerous private and public collections including those at the Albuquerque Museum, New Mexico Museum of Art, the National Hispanic Cultural Center Art Museum, the New Mexico History Museum, the Mexican Museum (San Francisco) among others.

== Awards ==
In 1995 and again in 1996, Abeyta received grants from the Art Matters Foundation. In 2005, Abeyta was awarded a grant from the Joan Mitchell Foundation.

== Death ==
Abeyta died in a motorcycle accident at age 58, when he was struck by a truck in Brooklyn, New York.
