= Bernardo Bitti =

Italian painter

Democrito Bernardo Bitti SJ
- Born: 1548; Camerino, Italy
- Died: 1610 (aged 61–62); Lima, Viceroyalty of Peru, Spanish Empire
- Known for: Painting
- Notable work: Coronation of the Virgin; The Virgin of the Candelaria; Immaculate Conception; Agony in the Garden
- Style: Mannerism

Democrito Bernardo Bitti SJ (1548–1610) was an Italian Jesuit priest and painter. He introduced Mannerism to Peru, where he went on a Jesuit mission after having studied in Rome. On his way to Peru, Bitti traveled through Spain, where he became influenced by Sevillian painting, especially that of Luis de Morales. Bitti arrived in Peru in 1575 and started painting for churches first in Lima and from 1583 in Cusco. His works in Lima include the typically Mannerist Coronation of the Virgin and The Virgin of the Candelaria for St. Peter's Church. The Immaculate Conception was a recurring theme in his paintings, one of which is in the Basilica of La Merced in Cusco. In addition to Mannerism, his works reflect ideas of the Counter-Reformation and religious education of the natives. After 1584, Bitti traveled all over South America, painting where he went. His mobile lifestyle was a testament to his popularity with the Jesuits, but it led to Bitti's being unable to set up a workshop or have apprentices. Nevertheless, his influence in the region was immense, and resulted in Mannerism persisting in South America even when it had fallen out of favor in Europe. Bitti is regarded as the founder of the Cusco School of painting.

== Career ==
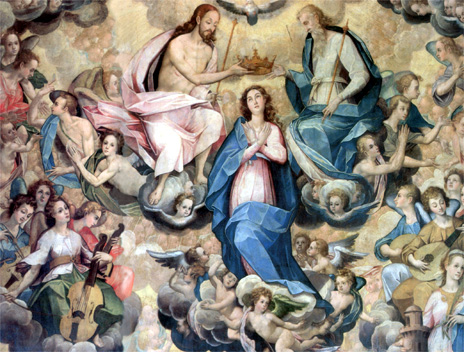
Coronation of the Virgin. Basilica and Convent of San Pedro, Lima.

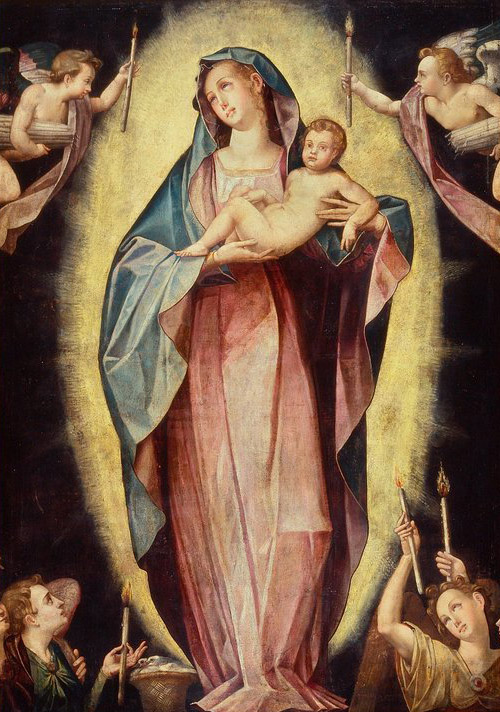
The Virgin of the Candelaria

Democrito Bernardo Bitti was born in Camerino, Italy in 1548. Few details about his life in Europe are known. He became a painter at an early age and as a teenager he moved to Rome to study painting for a period of five years. His studies focused on Italian Mannerism. At the age of 20, in 1568, Bitti became a Jesuit and relocated to the novitiate of Sant'Andrea al Quirinale, also in Rome, where he stayed until 1573. He might have painted some works there, but none survive.

Meanwhile, the Jesuit mission in the Viceroyalty of Peru had asked for Rome to send them skilled painters. Bitti was identified as the best one available; his Jesuit background would make him the ideal painter of altarpieces. Thus Bitti was commissioned on a Jesuit mission to Peru in 1571, becoming the first artist to travel on a Jesuit mission to South America. The expedition party traveled through Spain on their way to Peru. It is not known precisely what Bitti did during his stay in Spain, but it appears that he had the opportunity to study Sevillian painting for 14 months. It has been subsequently noted that his paintings resemble particularly those of the painter Luis de Morales, probably through seeing his works rather than by training with him. Influence by Giuseppe Valeriano is also attested. The Jesuit party arrived in Peru in 1575, where Bitti introduced Mannerism to the country. He became a very sought after artist because of the novelty of his style in the new continent. One of Bitti's first tasks was to paint a collection for the Jesuit college and St. Peter's Church in Lima. His paintings in the church include Coronation of the Virgin and The Virgin of the Candelaria. Bitti also made a retable in St. Peter's Church. He stayed in Lima for eight years, working.

In 1583, Bitti moved to Cusco, where he stayed until the end of 1584. There he painted Immaculate Conception and constructed a high altar, both for the Jesuit church of Cusco. For its Indian chapel, he painted a setting of the Last Judgment, now lost, the sight of which persuaded many natives to convert, according to Inca Garcilaso de la Vega writing in 1612. Later in his career, Bitti traveled through Spanish America including Potosí, Arequipa, Juli, Acora, La Paz, Sucre, and Chucuito. Most of his works were made in Juli. Of his paintings, only those in Peru remain. Bitti collaborated with other artists, including his fellow Jesuit Pedro de Vargas, in art projects all over the Peru. These collaborations included the sculptural support for many retablos.

== Works ==
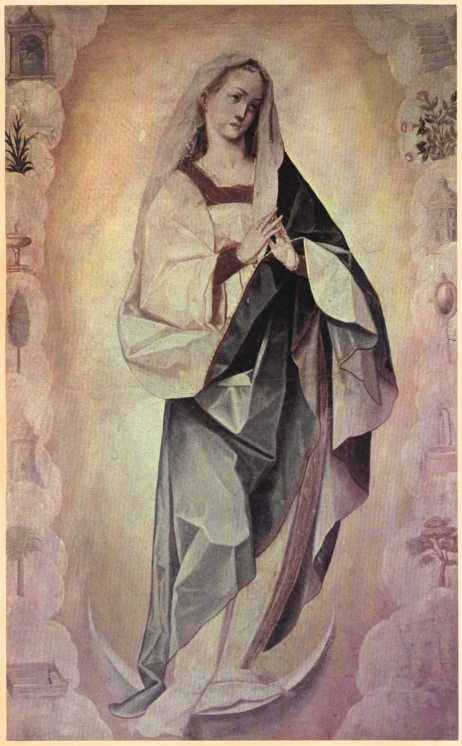
Immaculate Conception in Cusco

Most of Bitti's works are on the life and persons of Jesus and Virgin Mary. Especially numerous are his works on the theme of the Immaculate Conception, including a noteworthy one in Cusco. Bitti was painting for a dual audience of European-born immigrants and newly converted natives. He was also under the constraint of carefully crafting his works to conform with the requirements of the post Council of Trent era of Counter-Reformation.

His work is representative of Mannerism, characterized by elongated figures with slender limbs and delicate fingers in posing gracefully in condensed compositions. Drapery is characteristically crisp and "paper-like". The colors are saturated, often pastel blues and pinks. Bitti's Mannerism, however, "lacked the confusion, erudition, and sometimes erotic sway" that was typical of the style in his native Italy. Bitti painted in tempera, "with the delicacy of the followers of Michelangelo and Raphael". Lines are dominant and the colors are cool, exposing Bitti's kinship with the works of Giorgio Vasari. Although there is no contemporary material to conclude if Bitti's work was well-received, this is likely the case because he was sent to so many locations in South America. Today, Bitti's work is considered skillfully executed.

Coronation of the Virgin in St. Peter's Church is centered on the Trinity, below which Mary is found. Presentation is typically Mannerist in elongated limbs and elegant poses, with mostly soft blue and pink colors. There is experimentation with the colors, which change in shadows and folds of drapery. Floating in the clouds are angels and cherubs, with considerable variation in postures, with figura serpentinata all over. The painting, however, differs from typical Mannerism in one important regard. It is markedly symmetrical and focused. As such, it emphasizes the Trinity in accordance with the didactic mission of the Jesuits and in the spirit of the Counter-Reformation. Bitti painted the persons of the Trinity as clearly distinct: God the Father and Son are of different ages, and the Holy Spirit takes the form of a dove. This was to avoid potential confusion that could arise in the eyes of natives when looking at paintings that portray the Trinity as a three-faced man or three near-identical men.

The Virgin of the Candelaria, also at St. Peter's, features Mary holding infant Jesus while angels provide light with candles. The dramatic light it features is typical of the works of Bitti and something that he probably adopted from his time in Spain.

Immaculate Conception, an altarpiece in the Basilica of La Merced in Cusco, is typical of Bitti. Mary, with sharp features, is set against a background that does not reveal a setting. In the painting, made for devotion, she is at the same time accessible to the devotee and exists in an otherworldly realm. The colors are cool and pastel, and drapery folds in the typical brittle fashion. The painting relies on visual exaggeration reminiscent of the work of Italian Mannerists like Bronzino and Parmigianino, but without any eroticism.

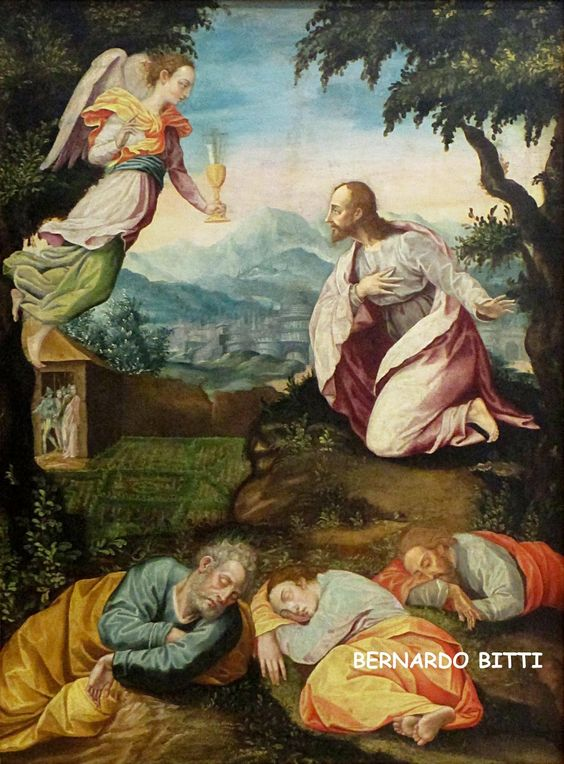
Agony in the Garden. Lima Art Museum

Agony in the Garden, painted c. 1600 and now in the Lima Art Museum, has an elongated and graceful Christ figure and an angel, both in pastel draperies that seem to ignore both gravity and the shape of their bodies.

== Death and legacy ==
Bitti returned to Lima and continued to work there until his death in 1610. At the time of his death, Bitti was an esteemed artist. Bitti is considered the founder of the Cusco School of painting. Even though many other Italian painters followed in his footsteps to South America – including Matteo Pérez and Angelino Medoro immediately in his year of arrival – few became as influential as Bitti, whose influence on painting in Viceroyal Peru was decisive. Although Bitti never stayed in one place long enough to establish a workshop or train apprentices, his work influenced many painters of the Andes, especially in Cusco and the Audiencia of Charcas in Bolivia. Gregorio Gamarra is the only artist known to have been a proper follower of Bitti. Lázaro Pardo de Lagos, Diego Cusi Guamán, and Pedro Bedón also exhibit influences. Through Bedón, Bitti influenced the Quito School. Many yet to be attributed works in Peruvian churches and monasteries also carry the hallmarks of Bitti's influence. Because of Bitti's influentiality, Mannerism featured in Peruvian and Bolivian art even after the style went out of fashion in Europe.

== See also ==
- Peruvian art
