= Marcos Zapata =

Peruvian painter

- Born: c. 1710; Cusco, Viceroyalty of Peru
- Died: c. 1773; Cuzco, Viceroyalty of Peru
- Other name: Marcos Sapaca Inca
- Known for: Religious paintings blending Christian and Andean elements
- Notable work: The Last Supper (c. 1748)
- Style: Colonial Baroque
- Movement: Cusco School

Marcos Zapata (c. 1710–1773), also called Marcos Sapaca Inca, was a Peruvian painter, known for combining Christian stories with indigenous culture. The most famous example being The Last Supper (c.1753), which represents the famous New Testament story, but with the incorporation of Andean foods such as Cuy. He studied and later taught with the Cuzco School where he had a workshop with multiple apprentices working to produce vast amount of paintings. The themes are primarily Christian subjects meant for churches in Peru and Chile.

== Biography ==
Zapata was born in Cuzco. He was one of the last members of the Cuzco School, an art center in which Spanish painters taught native students to paint religious works. In the Andean culture of Peru, Cuzco painters merged Christian symbols with indigenous Andean traditions. Zapata introduced elements from his own lands into his paintings. For instance, his 1753 rendering of the Last Supper shows Jesus and his twelve disciples gathering around a table laid with guinea pig and glasses of chicha. Guinea pigs, native to Peru and a culinary delicacy, play a significant role in Andean culture. They are used in Inca festivals as sacrificial animals, much like how lambs are used in traditional Christian ceremonies. In the painting, traditional elements like bread and ceremonial cups are joined by native foods such as potato, rocoto relleno, and corn. The blending of Andean culinary tradition with Christianity is a common theme in Cuzco paintings, especially as the painting's background features Christ on the Cross and Mary figures.

Between 1748 and 1764, Zapata painted at least 200 works. 24 of them portrayed the life of Saint Francis of Assisi for the Order of Friars Minor Capuchin of Santiago, Chile. He painted 50 linen cloths with the Laurentina Litany for the Cathedral of Santo Domingo, Cusco. Red and blue were prominent colors in his palette.

His influential style developed between 1748 and 1773; The themes are primarily Christian subjects meant for churches in Peru and Chile. He is known for his beautiful portraits of the Virgin Mary, almost always surrounded by cherubim. Zapata incorporated allegorical subjects in his Madonnas. Christoph Thomas Scheffler wrote in 1732, that the painter was inspired by prints of the subject. His compositions are didactic, with a relatively simple reading of complex theological concepts.

By order of the Jesuits, Zapata created another similar series of painting, assisted by his apprentice, Cipriano Gutiérrez. These included an enthroned Virgin, which Zapata finished in 1764 for the Parish of the Almudena. His majestic representation enjoyed enormous acceptance, judging by the large numbers of copies and variants that circulated in throughout the region. The fame of Zapata widely extended the limits of Cuzco, and its sphere of influence extended through Peru, Chile, and northern Argentina. The art of this teacher was continued in later decades by several of his followers, including Antonio Vilca and Ignacio Chacón.

== Education ==
=== Cuzco School ===
The Cuzco School is part of an art movement in the seventeenth century a type of art that is the mixture and influence of Spanish and Peruvian culture. The Cuzco School within this set was meant to describe a set of artists, guilds and workshops that all produced this type of artwork stemming from Cuzco. What made it stand out was the vast amount of work that was produced under the names of those were associated with it. Marcos Zapata was in said to be charge during the late eighteenth century.

== Select artworks ==
=== The Last Supper, c.1753 ===
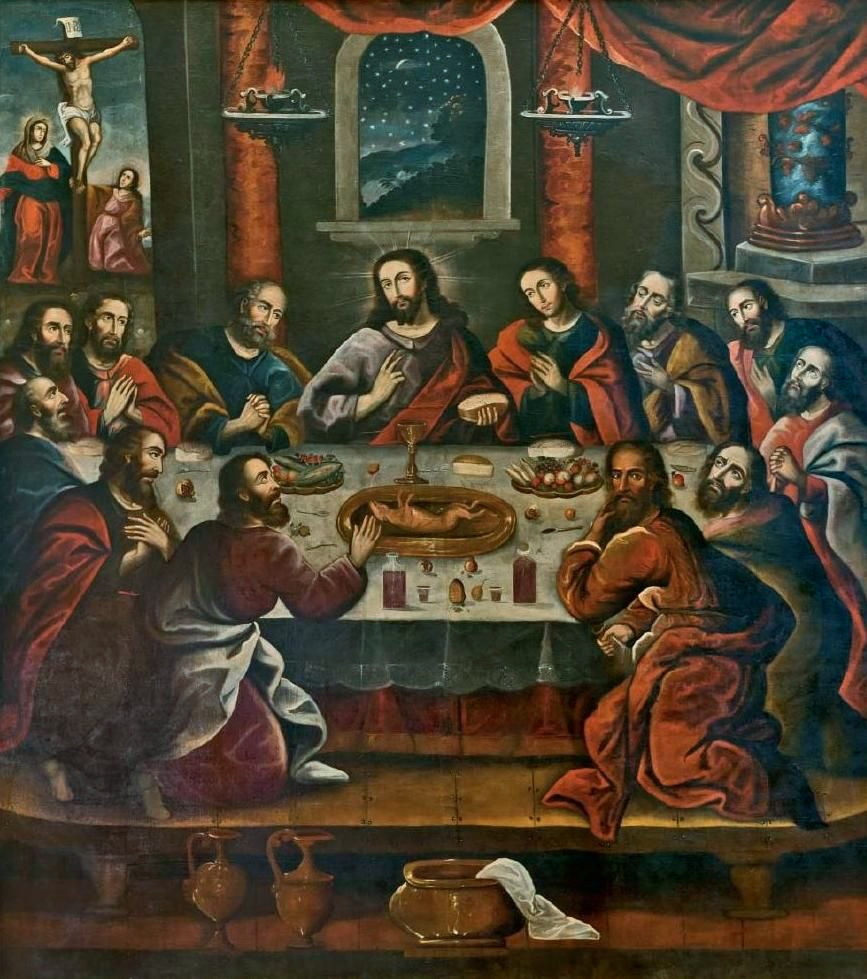
The Last Supper, c. 1753 by Marcos Zapata

Currently in the Cuzco Cathedral, it is a large oil painting that is attributed to Marcos Zapata. It differs from other depictions of the last supper by including food on the table that is common in Andean culture. On the table sits possibly a cuy, a source of protein eaten in the Andes as a delicacy and traditionally used as a sacrificial animal, or a viscacha, also traditionally associated with sacrifice. Tour guides at the Cuzco Cathedral have also suggested that instead of wine, the beverage depicted is chicha. Combining aspects of both native culture and European religion was used to create a unique connection for the natives of the region to the new ideas that were being brought in.

=== Virgen de la Silla with the graduation of the García brothers, c. 1750-1760 ===
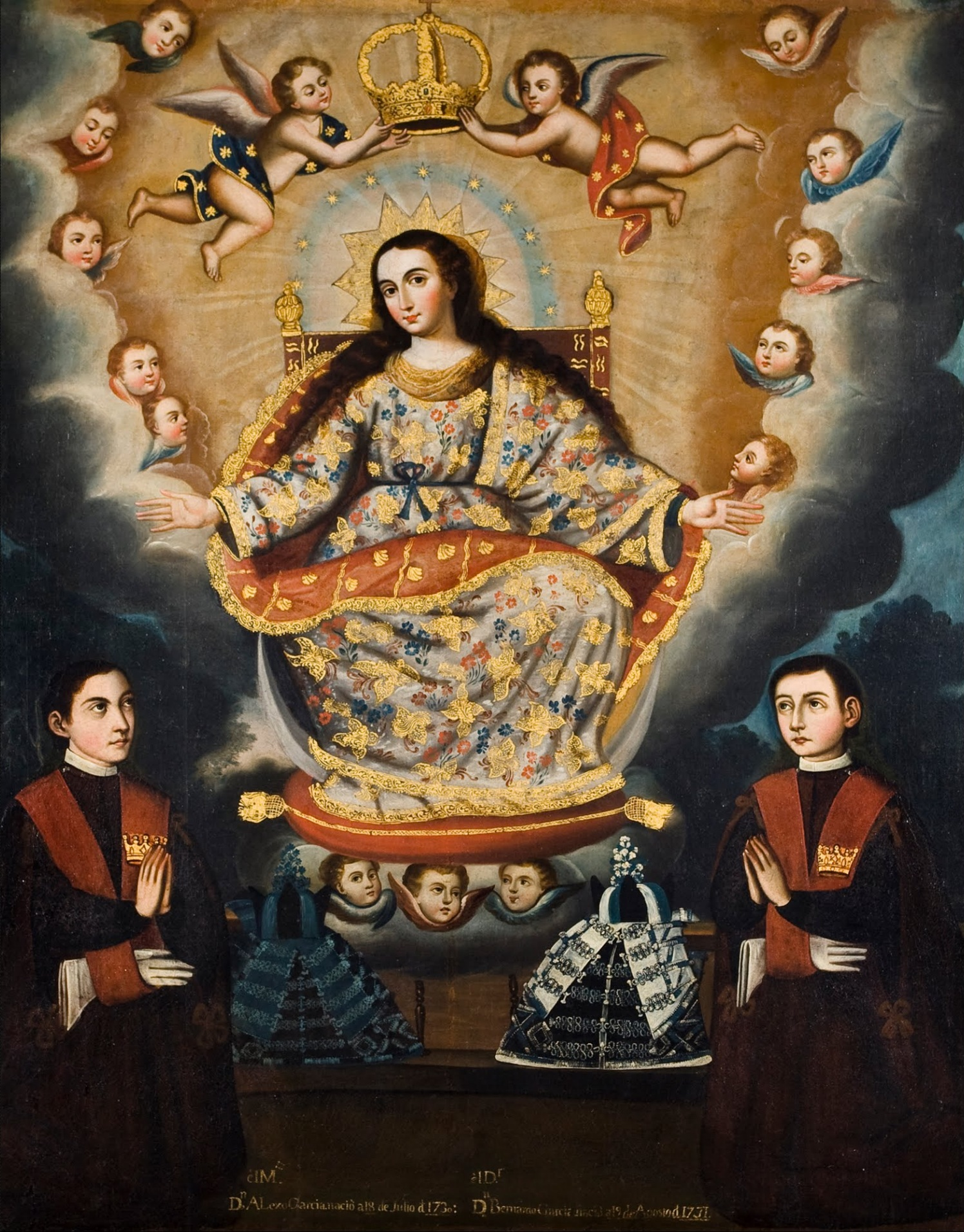
Virgen de la Silla with the graduation of the García brothers, c. 1750-1760, Marcos Zapata

188.5 x 155.5 cm, Painted by Zapata with oil on canvas. Commissioned by Alexo and Bernardo García to celebrate their graduation from University of San Antonio Abad. Portraits that reuse a composition to another of Zapata's pieces.

=== Adoration of the Magi, c. 1760 ===
188 x 50 cm, oil painting that is credited to Marcos Zapata and his workshop. This painting is another example of Christian stories and beliefs infused with Peruvian detail; such as the animals in the background meant to resemble more native creatures to Peru along with gold decoration on items such as cloth. This work was sold at action from June third to June fourth of 2014.

=== El rey Salomón (King Solomon), c. 1764 ===
207 x 166 cm, oil painting attributed to Marcos Zapata. Notable for it use of Vermillion pigments, uncommon at the time due to the materials used to mix it being rare.

== Exhibitions ==
=== Featuring "Virgen de la Silla with the graduation of the García brothers" ===
- Lima Art Museum. September 2015 – Present [Art to learn] Portraits: Identity, memory and power
- Telefónica Foundation Center, Lima. August–October 2007

=== Featuring "Adoration of the Magi" ===
- Los Angeles Museum of History, Science, and Art, September - October 1926
- "Decorative Arts of Spain and Spanish America," Toledo Museum of Art, November 2–30, 1930
- "Paintings & Decorative Art of XVI and XVII-Century Peru Collected by Mrs. Frank Freyer," Brooklyn Museum of Art, December 20, 1930 - September 30, 1931
- Catholic University of America, Washington D.C., 1931-1939
- "Loan Exhibition of Latin American and Pre-Columbian Art, "Institute of Latin American Studies, University of Michigan, July 7–25, 1939
- "Three Southern Neighbors - Ecuador, Peru, Bolivia," Newark Museum, April 14-December 31, 1942
- "The Frank Barrows Freyer Collection of Spanish-Peruvian Paintings," Lowe Art Gallery, University of Miami, November 14, 1961 – January 28, 1962
- "Treasures from Peru: Spanish Colonial Paintings from the School of Cuzco," Columbus Gallery of Fine Arts, 1967
- "The Frank Barrows Freyer Collection of Spanish Peruvian Paintings in the Denver Art Museum," The High Museum of Art, December 7–29, 1969.

== Collections ==
=== Collections featuring Virgen de la Silla with the graduation of the García brothers ===
==== The Lima Art Museum ====
-Colonial and Featured Works

=== Collections featuring Adoration of the Magi ===
==== Denver Art Museum ====
-Latin American Art
