= Antonio Sinchi Roca Inka =

Antonio Sinchi Roca Inka (17th century) was a Quechua painter from Peru and part of the Cuzco School.

== Background ==
His exact years of birth and death are currently unknown. Inka is from the town of Maras, Peru, located 40.8 kilometers northwest of Cuzco.

== Name ==
Sinchi Roca is the name of the second Sapa Inca who ruled the Inca Empire in the 13th century. The artist is often known simply as Antonio Sinchi Roca or Antonio Sinchi Roca Inca.

== Artwork ==
Inka was primarily a religious-themed painter who performed works for church commissions. His style is of the Cuzco School. He was financially assisted by Bishop Manuel de Mollinedo y Angulo, a major patron of the Cusco artists.

== Collections ==
Inka's work is displayed in the Cathedral of Santo Domingo, Cusco, which feature prophets, evangelists, and sacraments. His paintings can also be found in the Church of St. Francis of Assisi in Maras.
