= Master of Calamarca =

Bolivian artist

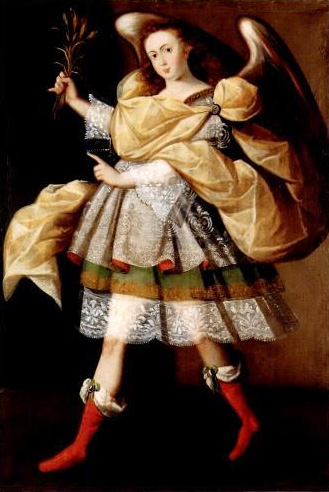
Angel with wheat stalks from the Church of Calamarca

The Master of Calamarca (real name José López de los Ríos, fl. first half of 18th century) was a Bolivian artist who created two series of angels painted with oil on canvas and displayed on the walls of a Catholic church in Calamarca, Bolivia in the Department of La Paz. His works were stylistically close to the artist Leonardo Flores from La Paz (fl. last quarter of 17th century).

The Calamarca church contains two sets of angels, most likely created by the same person. The first contains militant Ángel arcabuceros wielding firearms, with each angel's name written clearly at the bottom; the paintings of the Calamarca church are the most renowned, definitive examples of Ángel arcabucero type and Bolivian angel types in general. The second set depicts androgynous angels wearing billowing capes, elaborate short European-style female dresses and Roman military boots. They are unsigned, but each is carrying an object uniquely identifying the subject as one of Archangels of Palermo. According to a tradition stemming from medieval Palermo, these were seven archangels, venerated in Spain, although only three were recognized by the Church.

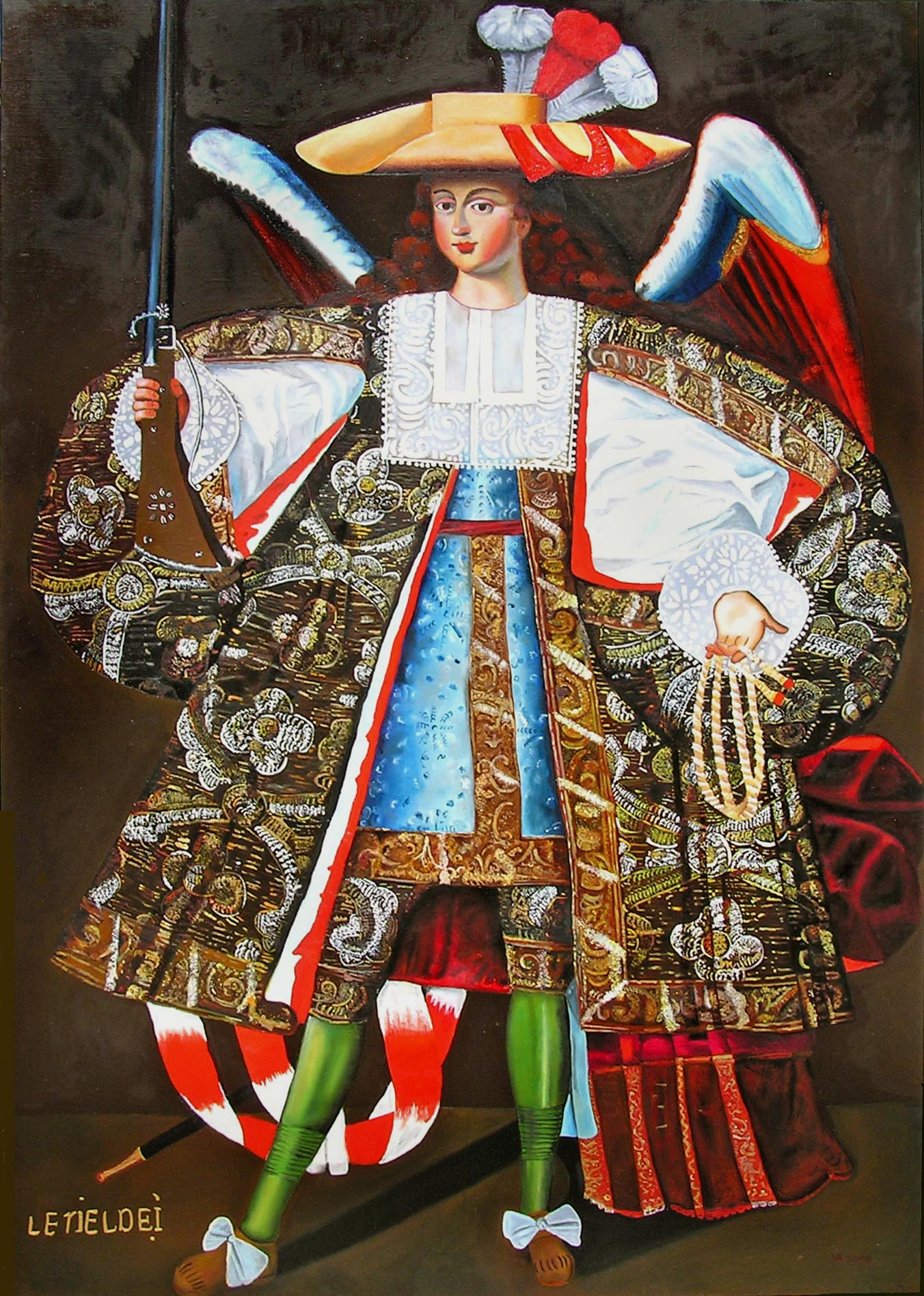

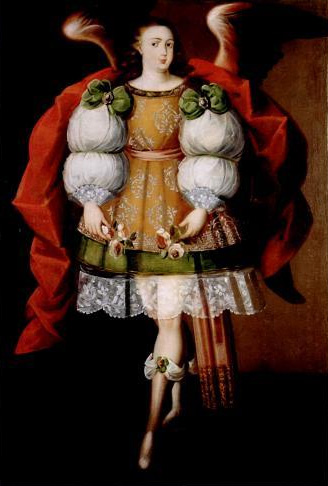
Angel Barachiel

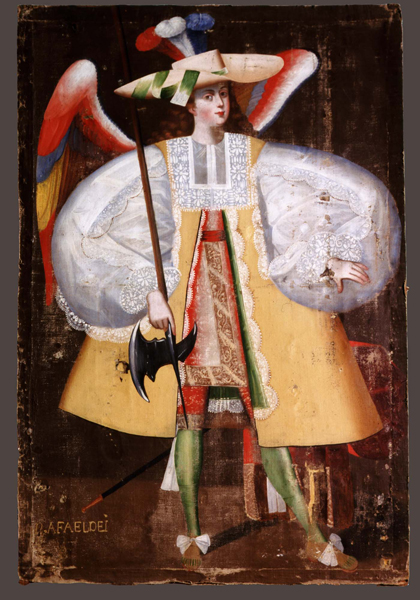

== See also ==
- Ángeles arcabuceros
- Cusco School

Media related to Master of Calamarca at Wikimedia Commons

== Sources ==
- Joseph J. Rishel, Suzanne L. Stratton (2006). The Arts in Latin America, 1492-1820. Yale University Press. ISBN 978-0-300-12003-5.
- Donahue-Wallace, Kelly (2008). Art and architecture of viceregal Latin America, 1521-1821. UNM Press. ISBN 978-0-8263-3459-6.
- Walsham, Alexandra (2006). Angels in the early modern world. Cambridge University Press. ISBN 978-0-521-84332-4.
- Thomas DaCosta Kaufmann (2004). Toward a geography of art. University of Chicago Press. ISBN 978-0-226-13311-9.
