= Ángel arcabucero =

Angel depicted with a firearm

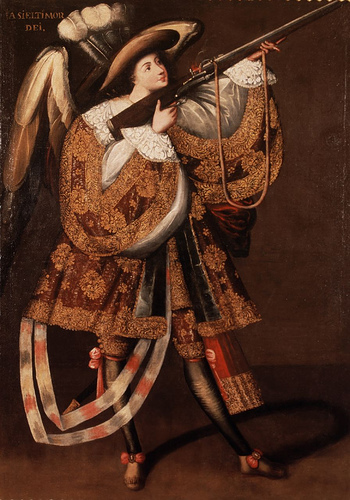
Asiel Timor Dei, c. 1680

An Ángel arcabucero (arquebusier angel) is an angel depicted with an arquebus (an early muzzle-loaded firearm) instead of the sword traditional for martial angels, dressed in clothing inspired by that of the Criollo and Andean nobles and aristocrats. The style arose in Peru in the second half of 17th century and was especially prevalent in the Cusco School.

In his work Ángeles apócrifos de la América Virreinal (1992), Ramón Mujica Pinilla noted the link between ángeles arcabuceros and certain winged warriors from the pre-Hispanic pantheon. The good reception that these works found among indigenous people of the era may be due in part to the ease with which they could identify these winged warriors with their ancient gods and heroes. According to Kelly Donahue-Wallace, the genre probably originated in the Collao region, near Lake Titicaca, and were actually based on Spanish and Dutch engravings. Some of these European prints depicted apocryphal archangels, condemned by the Church, but apocryphal motifs survived in the Andes. Another probable source for the angels' poses, corresponding to the military exercises of the period, were the engravings from the 1607 Exercise in Arms by Jacob de Gheyn II.

Church of Calamarca, about 60 km from La Paz, Bolivia, contains the most complete existing series of ángeles arcabuceros, including the Asiel Timor Dei by Master of Calamarca (around 1680), that are considered notable examples of the type.

At the beginning of the 18th century, the demand for paintings from all corners of the Viceroyalty grew rapidly. Hundreds of Cusqueño paintings, many of which depicted ángeles arcabuceros, were shipped to Lima, Upper Peru (Bolivia), Chile, and northern Argentina. To satisfy this demand, large artistic workshops, mostly indigenous, were established.

Today, Cusco School's colonial paintings of ángeles arcabuceros are found in, notably in the Church of Calamarca (Bolivia), many cities of Peru, Bolivia, northern Argentina, churches and museums in Mexico, in various museums in Spain and in the New Orleans Museum of Art. There is also a collection of ten ángeles arcabuceros in the San Francisco de Padua Church in Uquía, located in Argentina's Quebrada de Humahuaca.

There is also a preserved series of beautiful very ornate and polychromed ángeles arcabuceros sculptures made in the 17th-century Potosí, plundered and now located in the Peyton Wright Gallery (New Mexico, USA).

== See also ==
- Cusco School
- Sopó Archangels
- Latin American art

== Sources ==
- Donahue-Wallace, Kelly (2008). Art and architecture of viceregal Latin America, 1521-1821. UNM Press. ISBN 978-0-8263-3459-6. ISBN 978-0-8263-3459-6.
- Rishel, Joseph J.; Stratton, Suzanne L. (2006). The Arts in Latin America, 1492-1820. Yale University Press. ISBN 0-300-12003-6. ISBN 978-0-300-12003-5.
- Walsham, Alexandra (2006). Angels in the early modern world. Cambridge University Press. ISBN 0-521-84332-4. ISBN 978-0-521-84332-4.
