= Pedro Bedón =

South American Dominican friar and painter

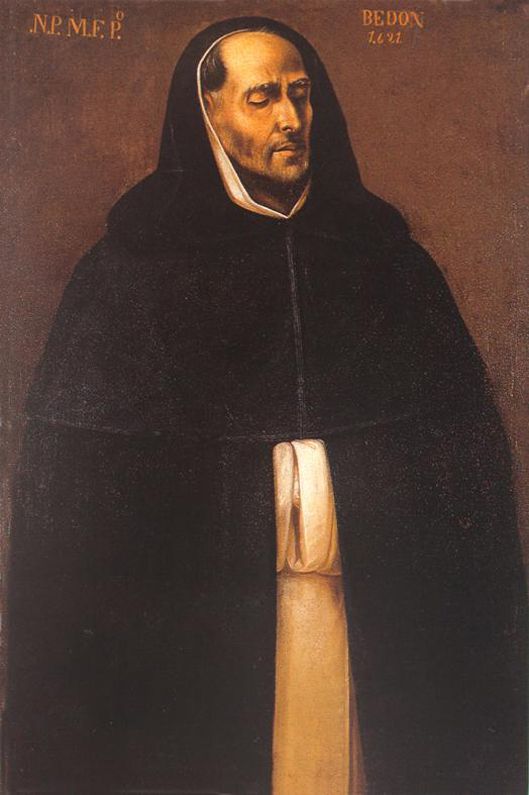
- Born: 1556
- Died: 1621 (aged 64–65)
- Occupation: Painter

Fray Pedro Bedón Díaz de Pineda (1556 [julian] – 1621) was a South American Dominican friar and painter of the Quito school.

== Biography ==
Fray Pedro Bedón was born in 1556 in Quito, then part of the Viceroyalty of Peru (present-day Ecuador). He entered the novitiate of the Dominican order at the age of fourteen, completed his studies in Lima, and was then appointed professor of philosophy in the college of that city. He studied painting under Italian artist Bernardo Bitti in Lima.

In his early life he had cultivated painting, and when afterward he had recovered from a dangerous malady, he resolved to devote his leisure to painting pictures of the Blessed Virgin. Several of his works are in the convents of Quito and Santa Fe, and are said to justify the title his countrymen gave him of the Fra Angelico of Ecuador. He founded the convent of La Peña in Quito, and then went to Rio-Bomba, where he founded another convent, but returned to Quito on learning that he had been elected prior of La Peña. In 1619 he was chosen provincial of his order, which office he held until his death in Quito in 1621.
