= Luis de Riaño =

Peruvian criollo painter (1596–c. 1667)

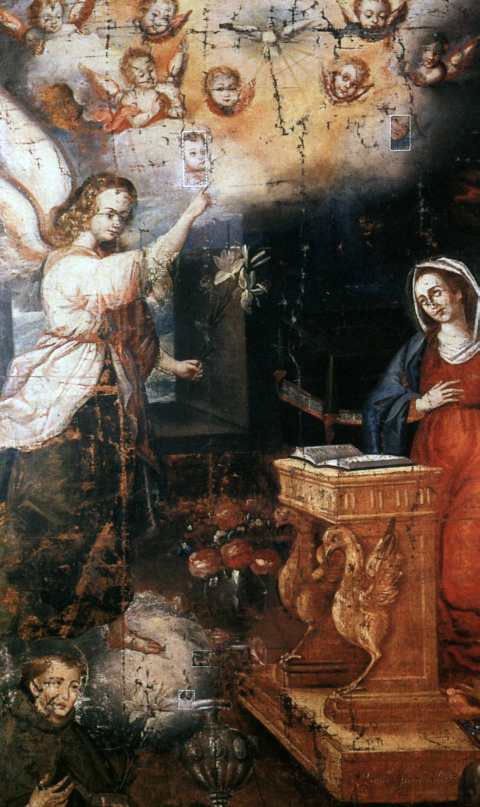
"The Annunciation of the Virgin" (1632), painting by Luis de Riaño located at Museo Pedro de Osma

Luis de Riaño (1596–c. 1667) was a Peruvian criollo painter, active in the 17th-century. His work is an important representation of Cusco School, the Peruvian colonial painting style. De Riaño is best known for his frescos painted in the 1630s at the Church of San Pedro de Andahuaylillas in Cusco, nicknamed the "Sistine Chapel of the Americas".

== Biography ==
Luis de Riaño was born in 1596 in Lima, Viceroyalty of Peru. He was the son of Ana de Cáceres, and Spanish captain Juan de Riaño.

He studied Counter-Maniera style painting under Angelino Medoro from 1611 to 1618. Another student of Medoro who started a few years earlier in 1604 was Pedro de Loayza, an Indigenous Andean painter. Medoro's painting "Inmaculada Concepción" (1618) in Lima was copied by de Riaño at the Recoleta Monastery in Cusco.

De Riaño is best known for his frescoes painted in the 1620s at the Church of San Pedro de Andahuaylillas in the Andahuaylillas District in Cusco, nicknamed the "Sistine Chapel of the Americas". The painting depicts the roads to heaven and to hell.

He remained an active painter until the 1640s. He is thought to have had financial problems later in life. He died after 1667.

== Works ==
- Inmaculada Concepción, Recoleta Monastery (Spanish: Convento de la Recoleta), Cusco
- Various frescos, paintings, and murals, Church of San Pedro de Andahuaylillas (Spanish: Iglesia de San Pedro), Cusco
  - Bautismo de Cristo, Church of San Pedro de Andahuaylillas (Spanish: Iglesia de San Pedro), Cusco
  - San Miguel arcángel, Church of San Pedro de Andahuaylillas (Spanish: Iglesia de San Pedro), Cusco
  - Four canvases related to the life of Saint Peter, Church of San Pedro de Andahuaylillas (Spanish: Iglesia de San Pedro), Cusco
  - Two canvases related to the life of Saint Paul, Church of San Pedro de Andahuaylillas (Spanish: Iglesia de San Pedro), Cusco
- Inmaculada (1638), Church of Santa Catalina (Cusco), Cusco
- Santa Catalina de Alejandría, private collection, Cusco
- Anunciación de la Virgen por Arcángel Miguel (1632), Museo Pedro de Osma, Lima
- Los desposorios de la Virgen
- Bautismo de Cristo
