= Matteo Pérez =

Italian painter

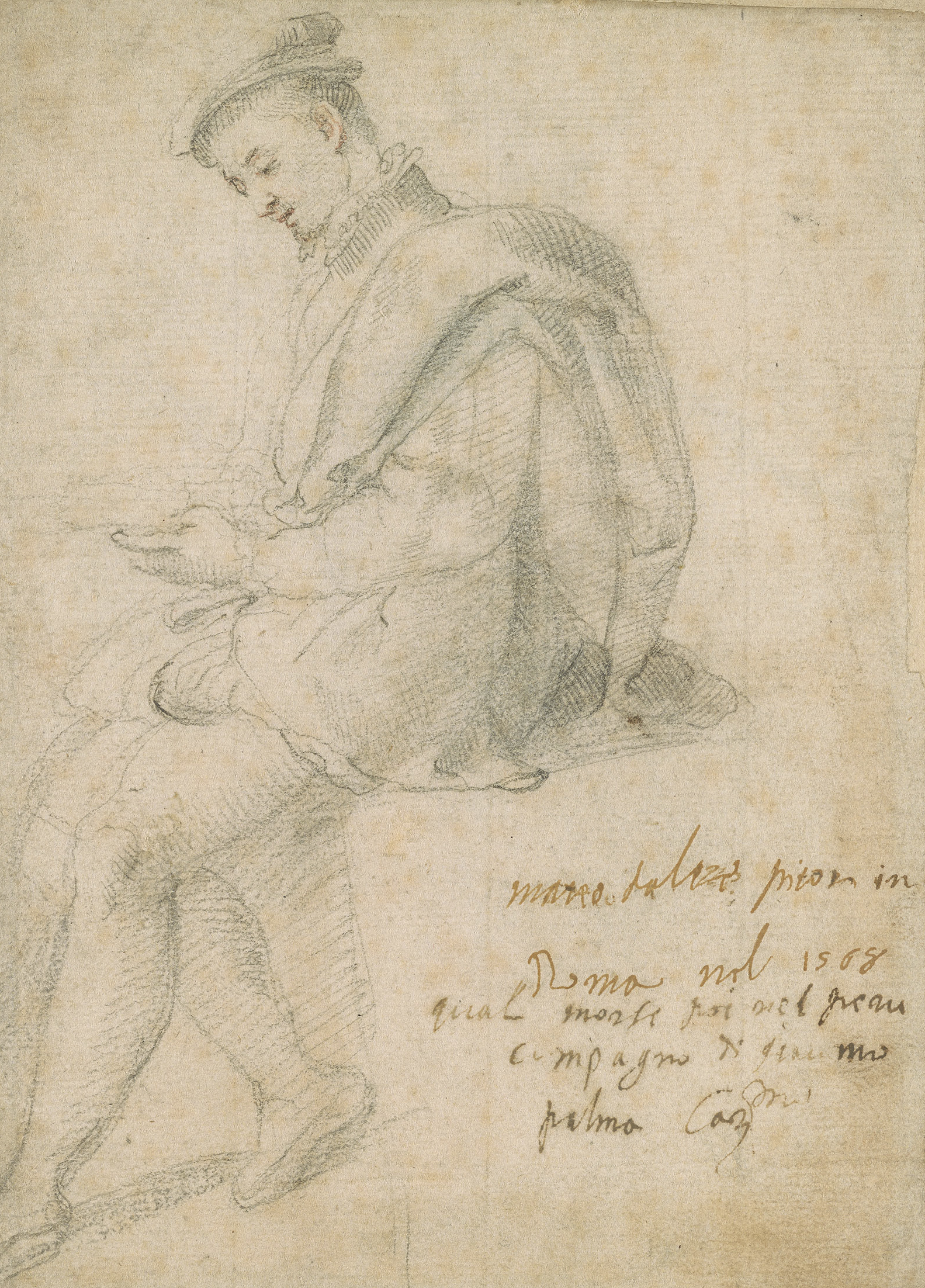
The Painter Matteo da Lecce (attributed to Palma il Giovane, 1568)

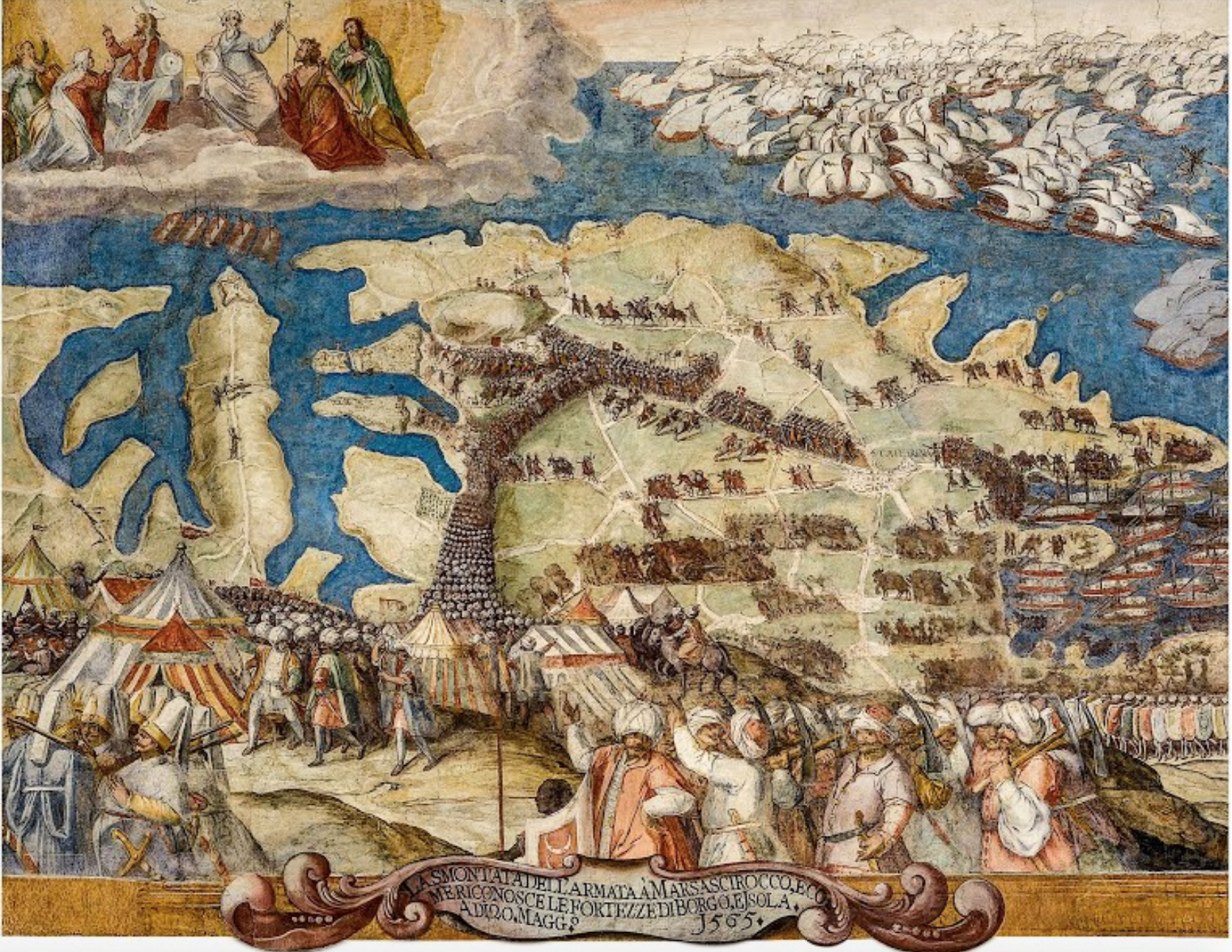
The Siege of Malta - Arrival of the Turkish fleet

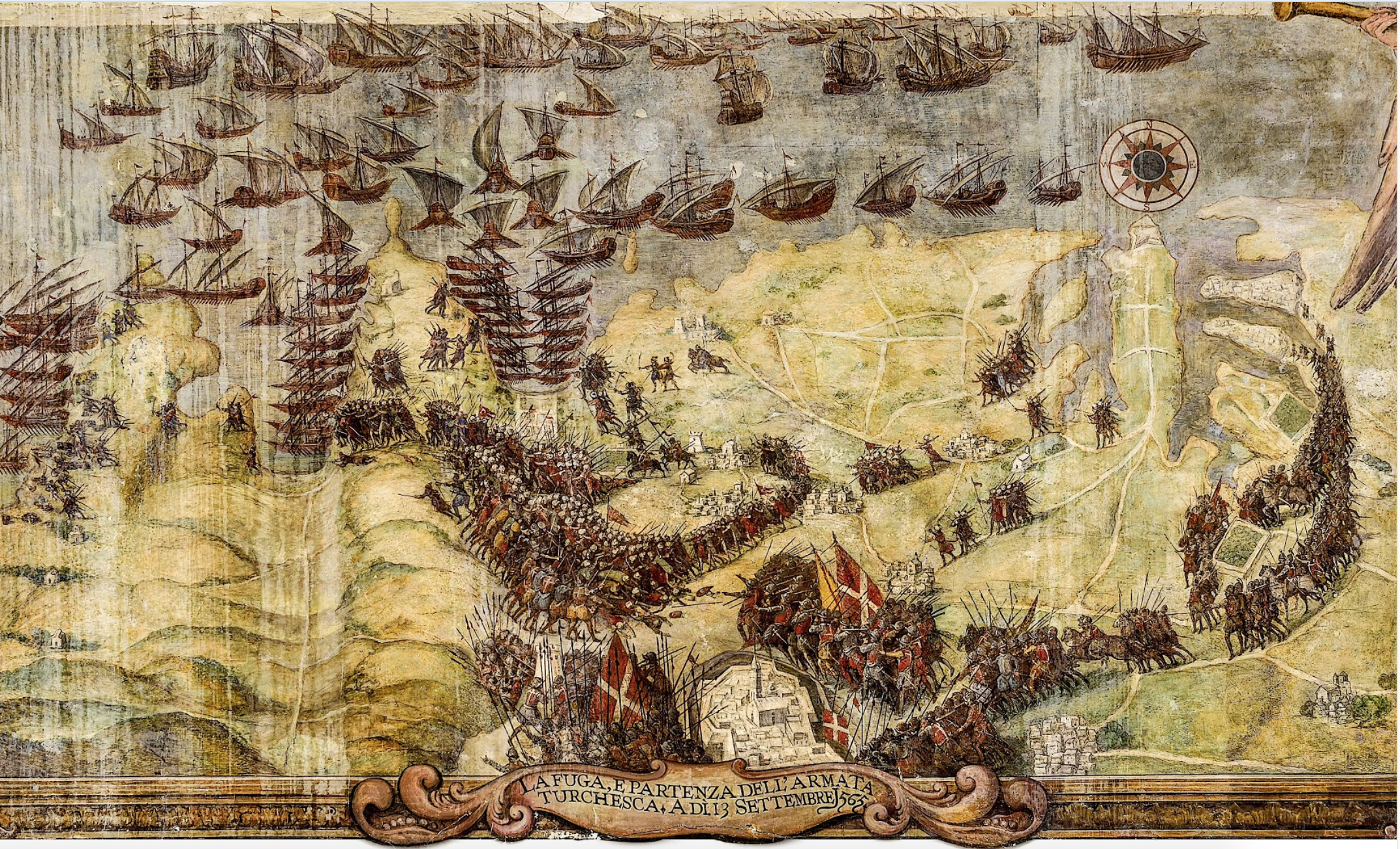
The Siege of Malta - Flight of the Turks

Matteo Pérez de Alesio (1547 – c. 1616) was an Italian painter of devotional, historical and maritime subjects during the Mannerist period. He was also known as Matteo da Lecce by virtue of his hometown of Lecce. He spent the majority of his entire artistic career in Peru, where he lived more than 40 years, between 1588 and 1628.

== Biography ==
Matteo Pérez was the son of Antonio de Alessio and Madama Lucente. He was born in Lecce in the Apulia region.

=== Italy, Malta and Seville ===
He studied under Michelangelo, working on the Sistine Chapel, in the Vatican, painting the Fall of the Angels in the facade facing Michelangelo's Last Judgment. He was a member of the Accademia di San Luca in Rome. He also painted an altarpiece for Sant'Eligio degli Orefici.

He travelled to Naples where he met the artist Pablo Moron, who became his long-standing assistant. Perez's works in Rome include the fresco The Dispute over the Body of Moses (circa 1574) in the Sistine Chapel; frescoes in the Villa d'Este in Tivoli and the Villa Mondragone in Frascati. He also worked in Malta (from 1576), Seville (in the 1580s) and Lima (from 1589), where he died.

The Hall of St Michael and St George, also known as the Throne Room, of the Grandmaster's Palace, Valletta, is decorated with 13 of his frescoes showing the events of the great siege of Malta by the Turks in 1565. He is credited with having introduced mannerism to Malta with his frescoes. These were painted from 1575 to 1581, at the same time as the oil paintings of the same scene, four of which can be found in the Cube Room of the Queen's House, Greenwich, London. Among his other works in Malta there is the Baptism of Christ which was originally the titular painting of the St. John's Co-Cathedral.

He migrated to Spain in 1583. He completed a monumental fresco, in 1584, in the cathedral of Seville, representing a giant St. Christopher carrying the Infant Saviour on his shoulder. He painted in the same subject in 1587 for the church of San Miguel, and he also painted in other public edifices at Seville.

=== Peru ===
Pérez de Alesio came to Lima from Rome, accompanied by his disciple and helper Pedro Pablo Morón whom he had contracted as an apprentice in 1583. Morón was to serve him as a helper with a salary of 200 ducados for the 10 years that the contract would last. In 1593, Pérez de Alesio renewed the contract for another 2 and a half years, giving Morón three times the original agreed upon amount. He renewed the contract again for another two years in 1595.

Contracts dating from 1588 to 1628 place Pérez de Alesio in Lima. He brought with him a collection of prints by Dürer and opened a workshop that attracted a number of students and disciples, including Pedro Pablo Morón but also Francisco García (in 1595); the Augustinian friar Francisco Bejarano (in 1599); Domingo Gil from 1600 to 1603; Cosme Ferrero Figueroa and later his son Adriano; forming what Rubén Vargas Ugarte described as one of the first art academies in Lima. In 1590 he painted a portrait of the viceroy García Hurtado de Mendoza, the fourth Marques of Cañete, and as a result he signed a document as "Painter of his Lordship the Lord Viceroy." In 1592 he achieved the degree of Gentleman of the Company of Arcabuz Horsemen of the "Guard of this Kingdom of Peru"

According to a document dated 1591 from the Peruvian Nacional Archive, recorded by the scribe Córdova [f. 376] he contracted to make several paintings for the general Don Antonio Picado for 300 pesos, among these paintings an image of the Virgin Mary on a copper plate; and a full-length portrait of Picado's wife, Doña Mayor Bravo de Saravia. Antonio Picado was procurador for the city of Arequipa, where Pérez de Alesio made the main altarpiece of the church of Saint Dominic. He carved an altarpiece for the Mercedarian church of Huánuco as well.

In 1595 Pérez de Alesio acquired from Francisco López, for 350 pesos, 50 portraits of figures that López had brought from Castille. Aside from his art, Pérez de Alesio also tried to make his fortune in the gold and silver mines of Vilcabamba (Cusco) and Huancavelica. Many documents of mercantile and business exchanges survive that attest to his activity in these areas; these documents rarely mention his artistic facet.

In 1600 he was charged with the adornment of the main chapel of the church of Saint Dominic of Lima, along with Morón, but some documents suggest that this work had already begun between 1593 and 1594 thanks to a donation from Don Alonso Picado in support of Pérez de Alesio's work.

In 1606, at the request of Juan de Vega, he painted seven paintings for one of the churches of Huánuco. The paintings were of relatively small size and included as themes "Christ with the Cross on his back and his Holy Mother" and another representing Jesus in on the cross.

Many biographies describe him as dying in 1616, but a contract of 1628 rejects this theory; in that year he sold an image of the Virgin Mary to the friar Francisco Puche of the order of Saint Benito for the church of Monserrate. In the same year he also decorated, with Morón, the funerary chapel of Captain Bernardo de Villegas and his wife Marcela de Montoya in the church of La Merced in Lima.

== Works ==
=== In Europe ===
- Villa d’Este Tívoli: Private Chapel of Cardinal Hipólito (1572), with Federico Zuccari.
- Villa Mondragone
- Chapel of Gonfalone
- Church of Saint Catherine of the Rotta: The Virgin with Child between Saint Catherine and Saint Apollonia
- Church of St.Paul Shipwreck Valletta: main altarpiece
- Church of San Eglio degli Orefici (1570 – 1571):
  - Frescos:
    - Virgin with Child surrounded by saints, the Holy Father, and the Crucifixion (dome)
    - Prophets (side)
- Sistine Chapel:
  - The Dispute over the Body of Moses 1574-75
  - Portrait of Pope Marcelo I (according to Redig de Campos)
- Cathedral of Seville:
  - Saint Christopher (fresco)
- Church of Saint James of Seville:
  - Saint James the Moor-killer at the Battle of Clavijo

=== In Peru ===
- Portrait of the Viceroy García Hurtado de Mendoza
- Church of Saint Dominic:
  - Life of Saint Dominic (church and cloister of the monastery)
  - Saint Jerome with Donor (crossing of the church)

=== Contested works ===
- Mercedarian Church of Lima:
  - Fresco in the cupula and pendentives of the chapel of Captain Villegas (according to the Argentinian historian Prof. Schenone)
- Small altarpiece of Huánuco - Painting on wood of Saint Augustine (copper on wood) and Saint Nicholas Tolentine (proposed by the historian Luis Enrique Thorn)
- Basílica y Convento de San Francisco de Lima (Church and Monastery of Saint Francis of Lima):
  - Murals of the life of Saint Francis
- Convent of Saint Rose:
  - Virgin of the Milk
