= List of Peruvian artists =

This is a list of Peruvian visual artists:

- Pablo Amaringo (1938–2009)
- Mario Urteaga Alvarado (1875–1957)
- Grimanesa Amorós (born 1962)
- Regina Aprijaskis (1919-2013)
- Ana Teresa Barboza (born 1981), textile artist
- Kimberly Barzola
- Hugo Orellana Bonilla (1932–2007)
- Herman Braun-Vega (1933-2019)
- Teófilo Castillo (1857–1922)
- Martín Chambi (1891–1973), photographer
- Gerardo Chávez (1937–2025)
- Elena Damiani (born 1979)
- Victor Delfín (born c. 1927)
- Apolonia Dorregaray Veli (1914-2002), skilled maker of mate burilado
- Andrea Hamilton (born 1968), fine-art photographer
- Daniel Hernández (1856–1932)
- César Yauri Huanay (born 1962)
- Elena Izcue (1889–1970), illustrator, graphic artist
- Daniela Lalita (b. 1992), musician, model, artist
- Harry Roldán Pinedo Valera (born 1988)
- Carlos Enrique Polanco
- Irma Poma Canchumani (born 1969), mate burilado artist
- Jorge Vinatea Reinoso (1900–1931)
- José Sabogal (1888–1956)
- Josué Sánchez (born 1945)
- Basilio Santa Cruz Pumacallao (1635–1710)
- Fernando de Szyszlo (1925–2017)
- Antonio Sinchi Roca Inka (17th century)
- Elena Tejada-Herrera
- Diego Quispe Tito (1611–1681)
- Elliot Túpac, muralist and lettering artist
- Boris Vallejo (born 1941)
- Alberto Vargas (1896–1982)
- Marcos Zapata (c. 1710–1773)

== See also ==
- List of Latin American artists
- Peruvian art
