= Bernardo Rivero =

Peruvian painter

- Born: 1889; Callao, Peru
- Died: 1965; Lima, Peru
- Education: Escuela Nacional de Bellas Artes de Lima
- Known for: Landscapes, Still Life, Buildings

Bernardo Rivero Arenazas was born in 1889 (some historians say 1886) in Callao, Peru and died in Lima in 1965. He is considered one of the greatest Peruvian painters of the early 20th century and one of the pioneers of Peruvian painting. The Law and Political Science Faculty of the Universidad de San Martín de Porres includes Rivero as part of the great masters of the Peruvian painted art and states that between 1890 and 1935 a generation of painters was born, distinguished for their great versatility in the aesthetic field.

Gerald Hirschhorn, in his book Sebastián Salazar Bondy: Pasion por la Cultura, mentions that Rivero studied alongside the Peruvian master Daniel Hernandez Morillo in the Escuela Nacional de Bellas Artes de Lima. The school was inaugurated on April 15, 1919 and Rivero was one of the first students, together with Ricardo Flores, Jorge Vinatea Reynoso, Alejandro Gonzales (Apurimak), Julia Codesido, Carlos Quispe Asin and Elena Izcue, among others. Rivero's colleague Wenceslao Hinostroza once stated that "he [Rivero] painted for the painting" and knew how to keep his singular modesty even with the great success reached by his finished work. Rivero traveled to many cities in Perú and throughout the American continents. He specialized in landscapes, particularly his Lima surroundings, using color and feeling to create them.

Alfonso Castrillon Vizcarra, director of the Institute of Museologic and Artistic Investigations of Ricardo Palma University and previously general director of the National System of Museums of the National Culture Institute of Peru, created an essay called: "Los Independientes: instancias y antagonismos en la plástica peruana de los años 37 al 47". Castrillon mentions that to promote the inauguration of the art gallery called "Primer Salon de los Independientes", two posters were made, one of which was from Rivero. Mirko Lauer, in his book Bodegón de bodegones, comida y artes visuales en el Perú mentions that Rivero preferred to paint chirimoyas and ripe avocados over the canvas. Rivero is mentioned in a book by Nanda Leonardini called El grabado en el Peru republicano: diccionario historico. The author states that Alejandro Gonzalez Trujillo, a painter known as Apurimak, was influenced by the personality and work of Rivero.

== Exhibitions ==
Rivero exhibited his work in 1919 in the exhibition rooms of the Casa Brandes, a musical instruments store, and was mentioned by the art critic Teófilo Castillo in 1919, together with Jorge Segundo Vinatea Reinoso.

In the chronology of the Peruvian painter Mario Urteaga, it is mentioned that in 1921 Rivero and Dario Eguren Larrea exhibited works in the main room of the Sociedad de Bellas Artes.

Rivero is part of a group of Peruvian painters of the 1930s called The Independents. Together with Sérvulo Gutiérrez, Ricardo Grau, Sabino Springett and others, Rivero was part of this group, opposed to the main artistic current at the time led by Jose Sabogal. In 1937 this group opened El Salon de los Independientes, in a place that is now occupied by the Art Museum of Lima.

Rivero and Enrique Camino Brent had individual expositions in June 1938.

In 1995, the Moll Art Gallery in Miraflores, Lima, had an exposition of the collective works of Rivero, Tilsa Tsuchiya, Alberto Dávila, Cristina Gálvez, Víctor Humareda, Julia Codesido, Óscar Allain, Carlos Aitor Castillo, Sabino Springett and José Carlos Ramos, among others.

In 1999, an exposition of oil paintings by the Pancho Fierro gallery of the Visual Arts Center of the municipality of Lima showed the history of the landscapes genre in Peruvian painting. The works were part of the Pinacoteca Municipal Ignacio Merino, and included paintings from such classic masters of the 19th and 20th centuries, as: Rivero, Ignacio Merino, Daniel Hernández, Teófilo Castillo, Mario Urteaga, Enrique Barreda, José Sabogal, Julia Codesido, Wenceslao Hinostroza, Víctor Humareda and Tilsa Tsuchiya.

Between May 30 and July 15, 2001, the ICPN and the Sudamerican Bank in Peru organized an exhibition called Los Independientes, distancias y antagonismos de la plástica peruana de los años 37 al 47. They had the art critic and historian Alfonso Castrillon as curator. Los Independientes included 72 works of a generation who opposed the artistic tendency of the period: Rivero, Francisco González Gamarra, Carlos Quízpez Asín, Ricardo Muro Grau, Macedonio de la Torre, Manuel Domingo Pantigoso, Teófilo Allain, Juan Barreto, Francisco Olazo, Federico Reinoso, Arístides Vallejo, Sabino Springett, Víctor Martínez Málaga, Elena Izcue, César Calvo de Araujo, among others. The exposition also included works of Masters representing the indigenism: José Sabogal, Julia Codesido and Camilo Blas.

On January 21, 2012, the mayor of the municipality of Lima inaugurated the art exposition called "Entre cerros y esquinas. Imágenes de Lima". One of the paintings shown was Rivero's San Pedro al Atardecer.

== Known paintings ==
- Esquina calle Palacio y Correo, vista del Campanario de Santo Domingo de Lima is shown in the 7th slide of the presentation by Gabriela Lavarello de Velaochaga
- Procesion en El Cusco 1921, oil on canvas, 54 x 64 cm, is being sold as of 2014 on MercadoLibre.
- Mirando las Naves Espanolas llegar, oil on canvas, 311 cm x 205 cm
- Calle Acequia Alta, oil on canvas, 18 x 12 cm.
- Bodegon showing bananas and ripe avocados, oil on canvas, 49 x 70 cm, from the collection of Rafael Belaunde, Lima.
- La Casa del Gobernador, oil on canvas, 45 cm high x 38 cm wide, is being sold in 2014 by Antiguedades en Vitrina, an Art and Antiques Gallery in Lima, Peru
- San Pedro al Atardecer

== See also ==
- Peruvian arts
- List of Peruvian artists
- Latin American art
