= Peruvian art =

Overview of art in Peru

Peruvian art has its origin in the Andean civilizations. These civilizations rose in the territory of modern Peru before the arrival of the Spanish.

== Pre-Columbian art ==
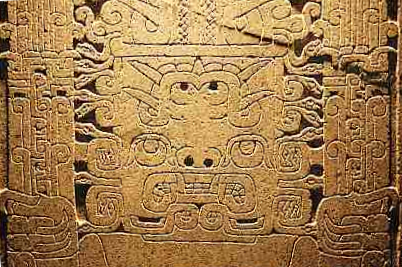
A detail of the Raimondi Stele. This stele was found out of its original placement at the ceremonial complex, Chavín de Huantar. It was cited by Pablo Picasso as an inspiration for his art.

Peru's earliest artwork came from the Cupisnique culture, which was concentrated on the Pacific coast, and the Chavín culture, which was largely north of Lima between the Andean mountain ranges of the Cordillera Negra and the Cordillera Blanca. Decorative work from this era, approximately the 9th century BCE, was symbolic and religious in nature. The artists worked with gold, silver and ceramics to create a variety of sculpture and relief carvings. These civilizations were also known for their architecture and wood sculpture.

Between the 9th century BC and the 2nd century CE, the Paracas Cavernas and Paracas Necropolis cultures developed on the south coast of Peru. Paracas Cavernas produced complex polychrome and monochrome ceramics with religious representations. Burials from the Paracas Necropolis also yielded complex textiles, many produced with sophisticated geometric patterns.

The 3rd century BCE saw the flowering of the urban culture, Moche, in the Lambayeque region. The Mochica culture produced impressive architectural works, such as the Huacas del Sol y de la Luna and the Huaca Rajada of Sipan. They were expert at cultivation in terraces and hydraulic engineering and produced original ceramics, textiles, pictorial and sculptural works.

Another urban culture, the Wari civilization, flourished between the 8th and 12th centuries in Ayacucho. Their centralized town planning was extended to other areas, such as Pachacamac, Cajamarquilla and Wari Willka.

Between the 9th and 13th centuries CE, the military urban Tiwanaku empire rose by the borders of Lake Titicaca. Centered around a city of the same name in modern-day Bolivia, the Tiwanaku introduced stone architecture and sculpture of a monumental type. These works of architecture and art were made possible by the Tiwanaku's developing bronze, which enabled them to make the necessary tools.

Urban architecture reached a new height between the 14th and 15th centuries in the Chimú Culture. The Chimú built the city of Chan Chan in the valley of the Moche river, in La Libertad. The Chimú were skilled goldsmiths and created remarkable works of hydraulic engineering.

The Inca Civilization, which united Peru under its hegemony in the centuries immediately preceding the Spanish conquest, incorporated into their own works a great part of the cultural legacy of the civilizations which preceded it. Important relics of their artwork and architecture can be seen in cities like Cusco, architectural remains like Sacsahuaman and Machu Picchu and stone pavements that united Cusco with the rest of the Inca Empire.

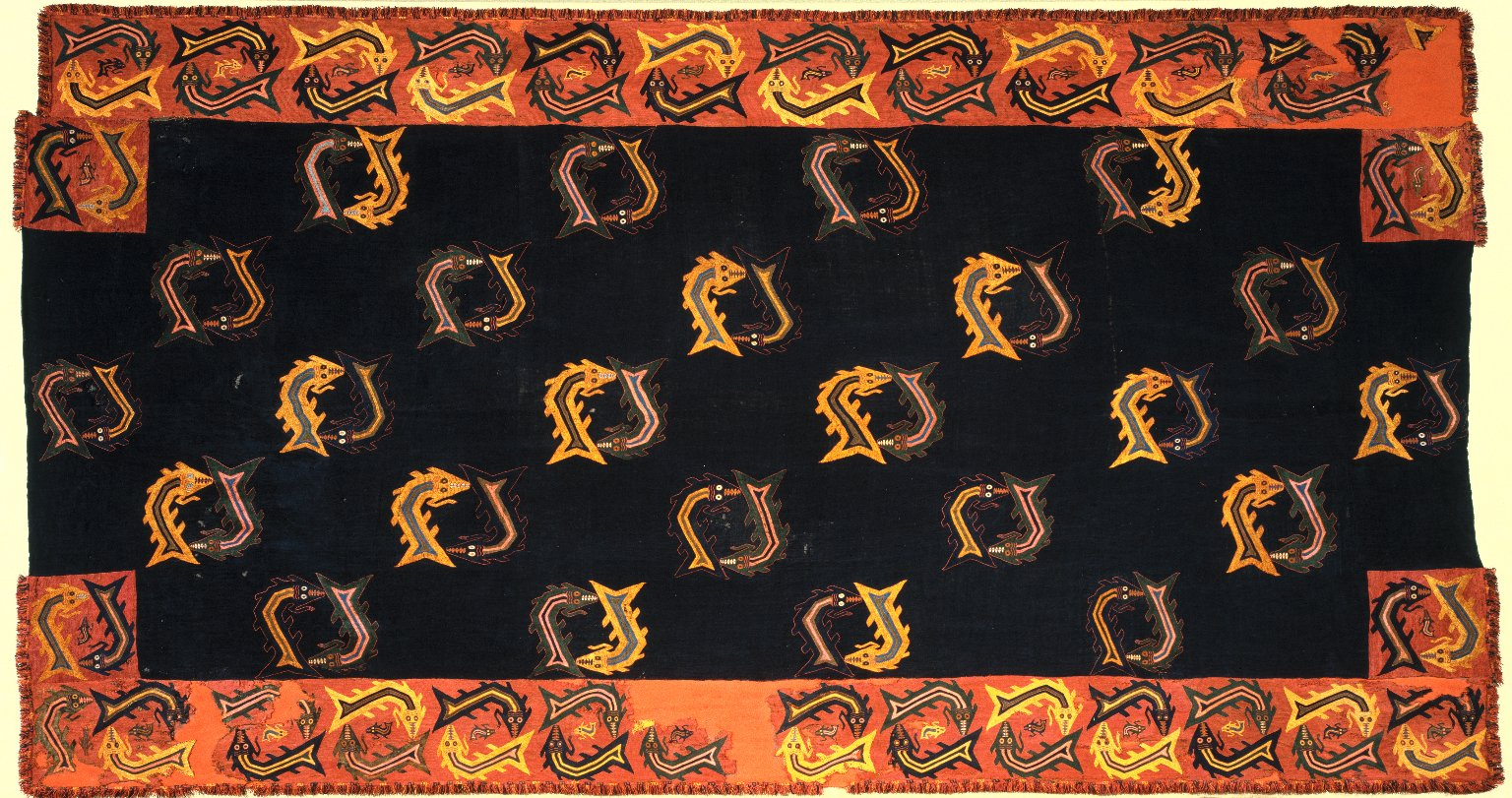
Nazca mantle from Paracas Necropolis, 1-100 CE This is a "double fish" (probably sharks) design, Brooklyn Museum

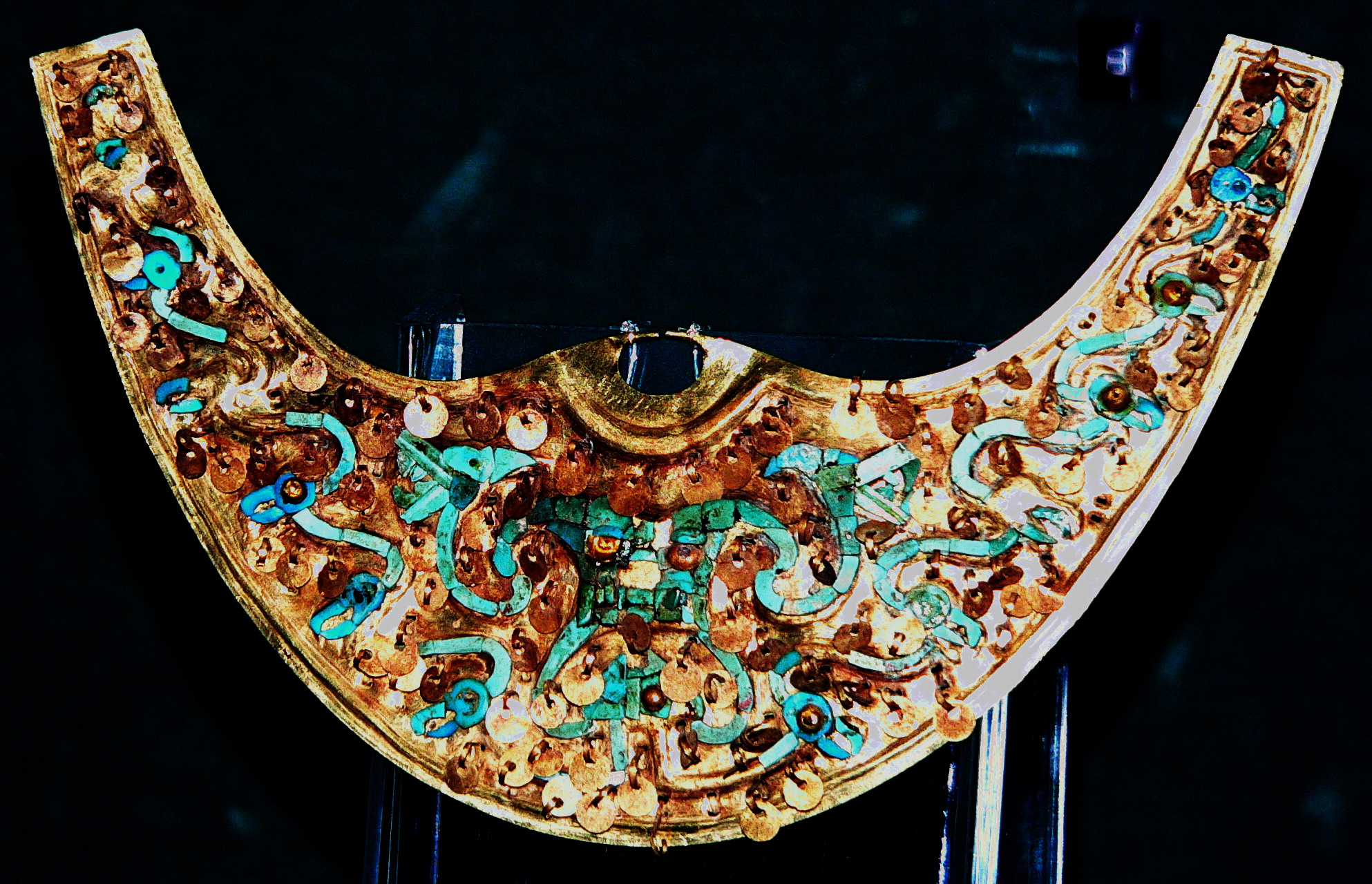
Moche Nariguera depicting the Decapitator (Ayapec, Ai Apaec), gold with turquoise and chrysocolla inlays, c. 200–850 CE, Museo Oro del Peru, Lima

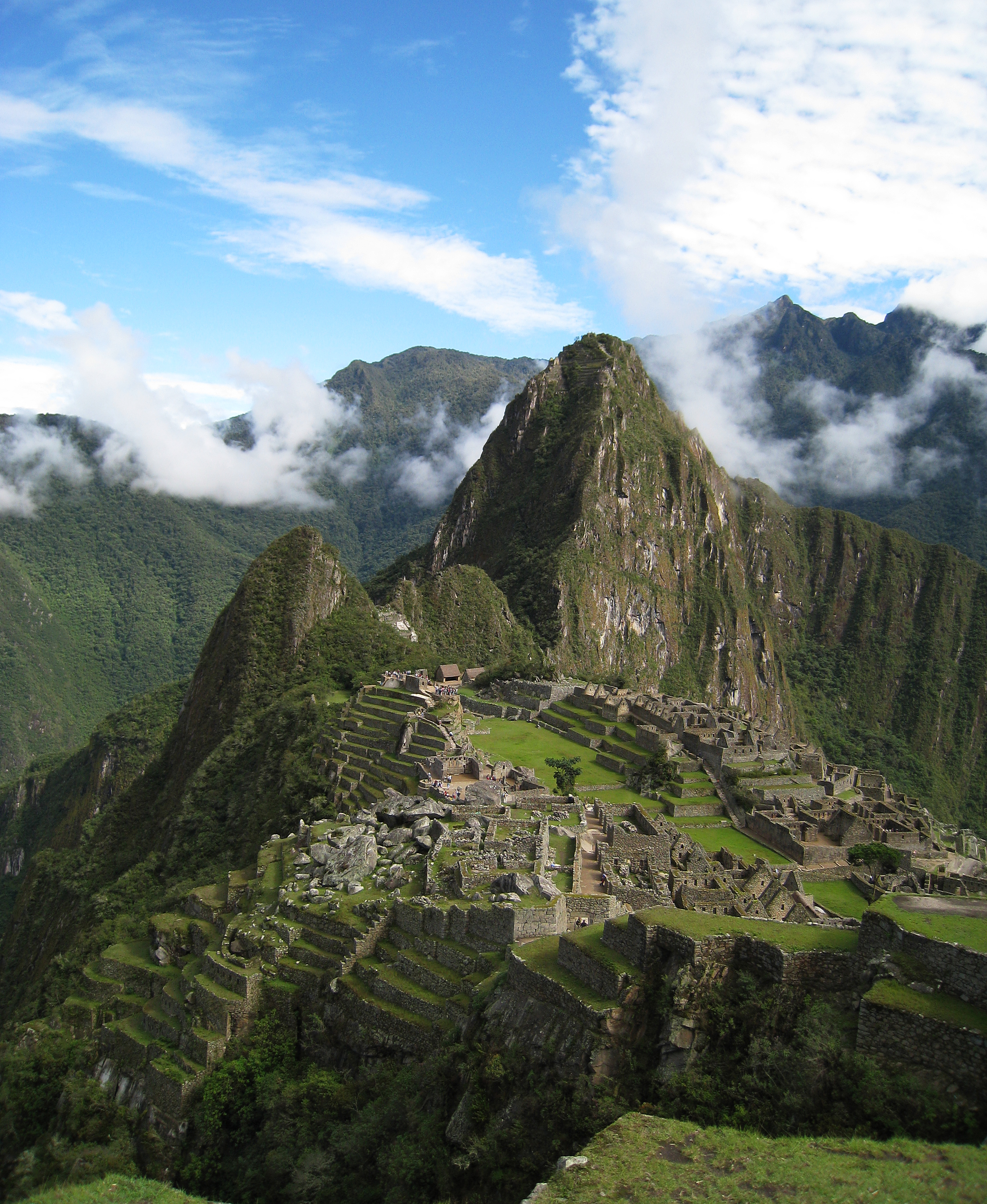
A view of Machu Picchu, Incan architecture, c. 1450 CE

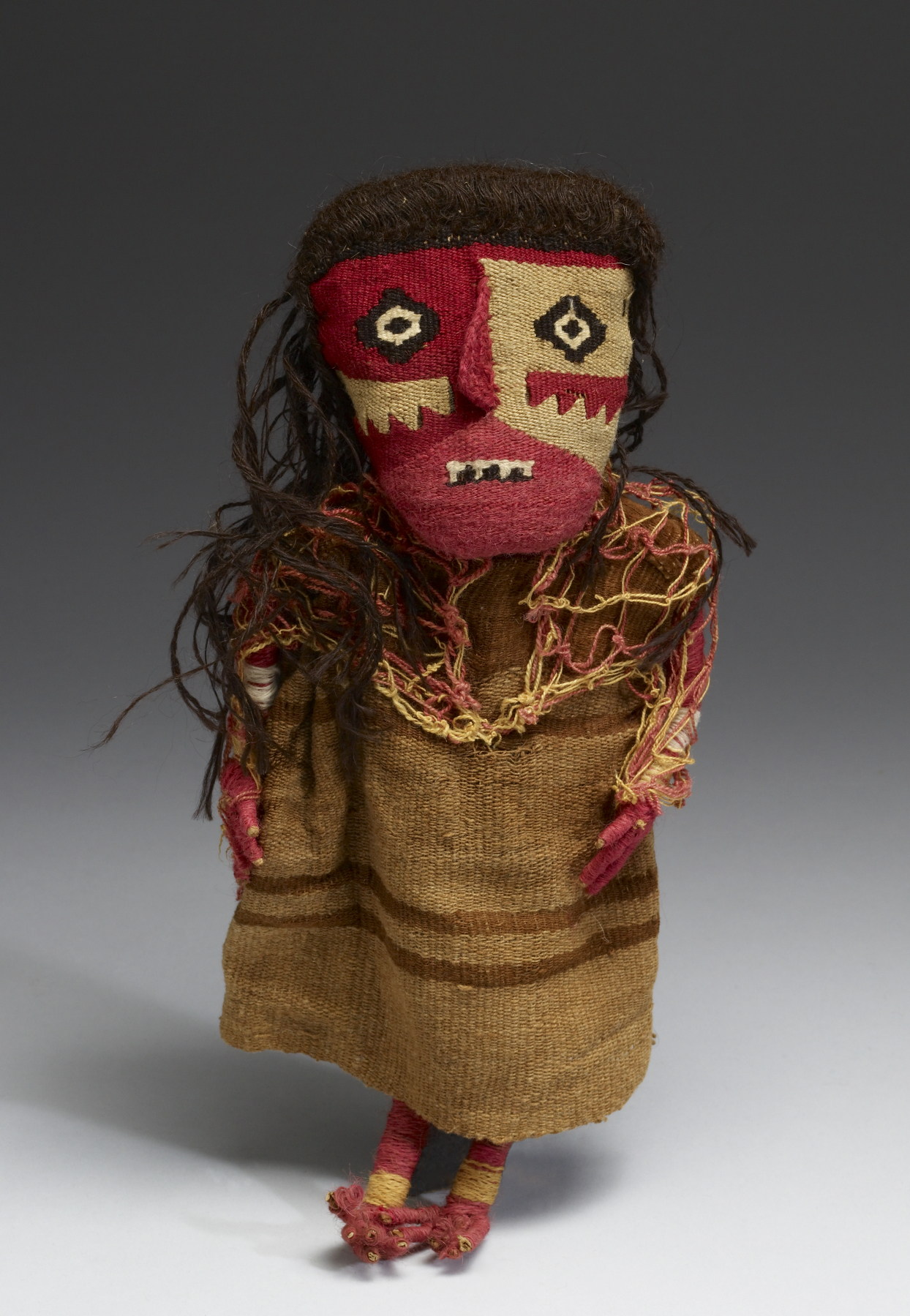
Textile doll (11th century), Chancay culture, found near Lima, Walters Art Museum. Of their small size, dolls are frequently found in ancient Peruvian tombs.

== Colonial art ==
Peruvian sculpture and painting began to define themselves from the ateliers founded by monks, who were strongly influenced by the Sevillian Baroque School. In this context, the stalls of the Cathedral choir, the fountain of the Main Square of Lima both by Pedro de Noguera, and a great part of the colonial production were registered. The first center of art established by the Spanish was the Cuzco School that taught Quechua artists European painting styles. Diego Quispe Tito (1611–1681) was one of the first members of the Cuzco school and Marcos Zapata (1710–1773) was one of the last.

Painting of this time reflected a synthesis of European and indigenous influences, as is evident in the portrait of prisoner Atahualpa, by D. de Mora or in the canvases of the Italians Mateo Pérez de Alesio and Angelino Medoro, the Spaniards Francisco Bejarano and J. de Illescas and the Creole J. Rodriguez.

During the 17th and 18th centuries, the Baroque Style also dominated the field of plastic arts.

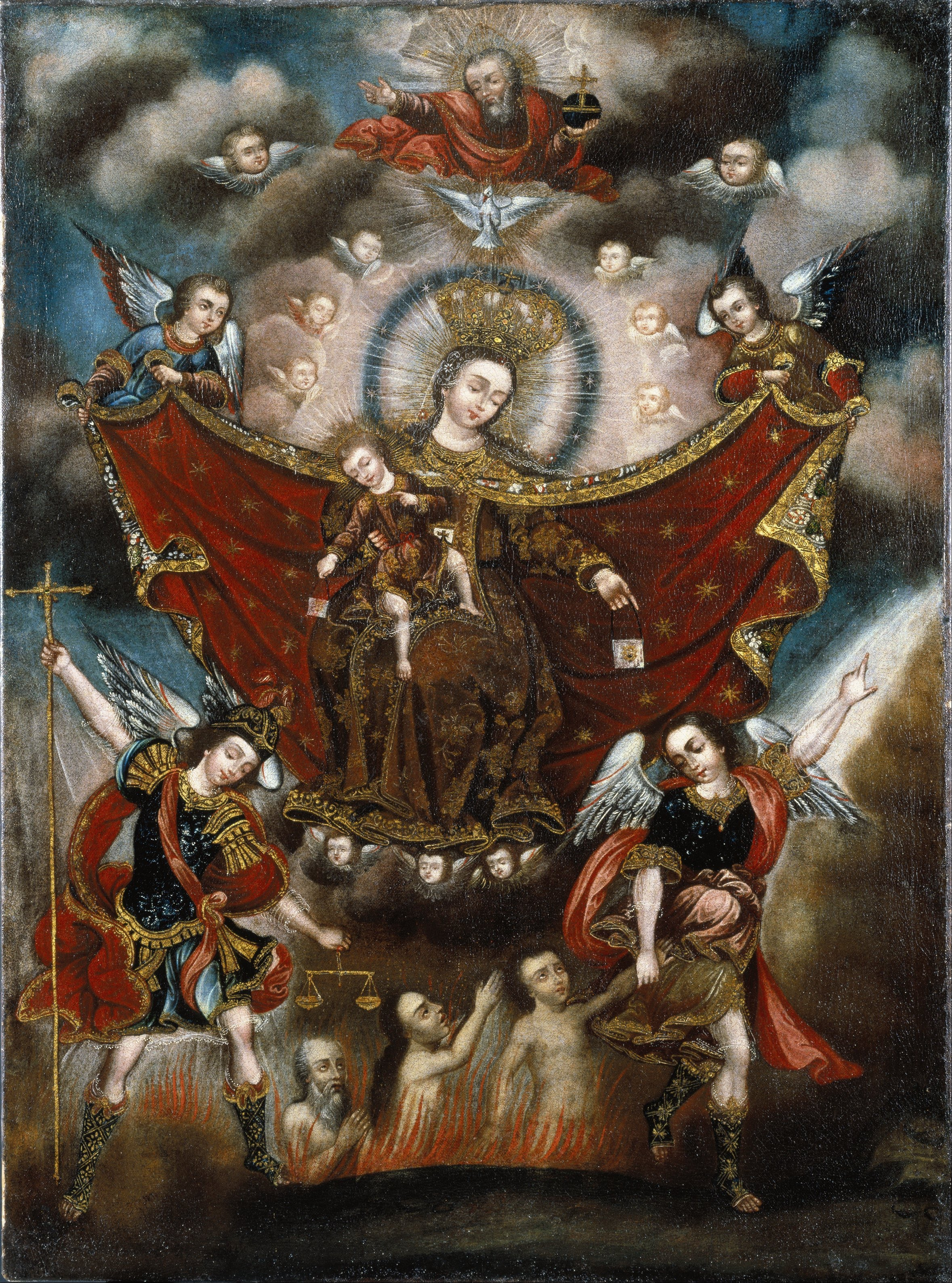
Virgin of Carmel Saving Souls in Purgatory, Circle of Diego Quispe Tito, 17th century, collection of the Brooklyn Museum

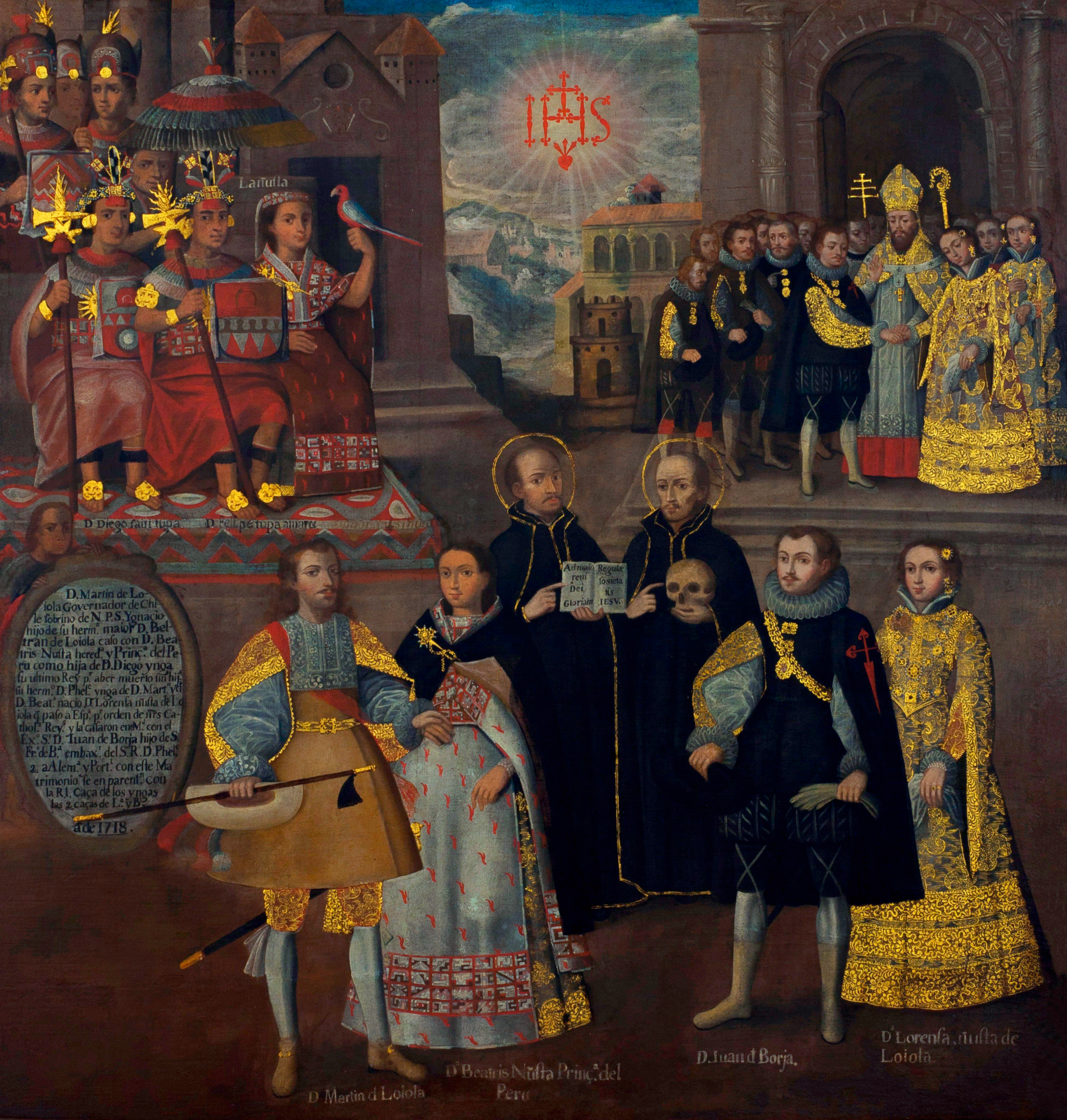
The Marriage of Captain Martin de Loyola to Beatriz Ñusta, c. 1675–1690, Church of la Compañía de Jesús, Cuzco

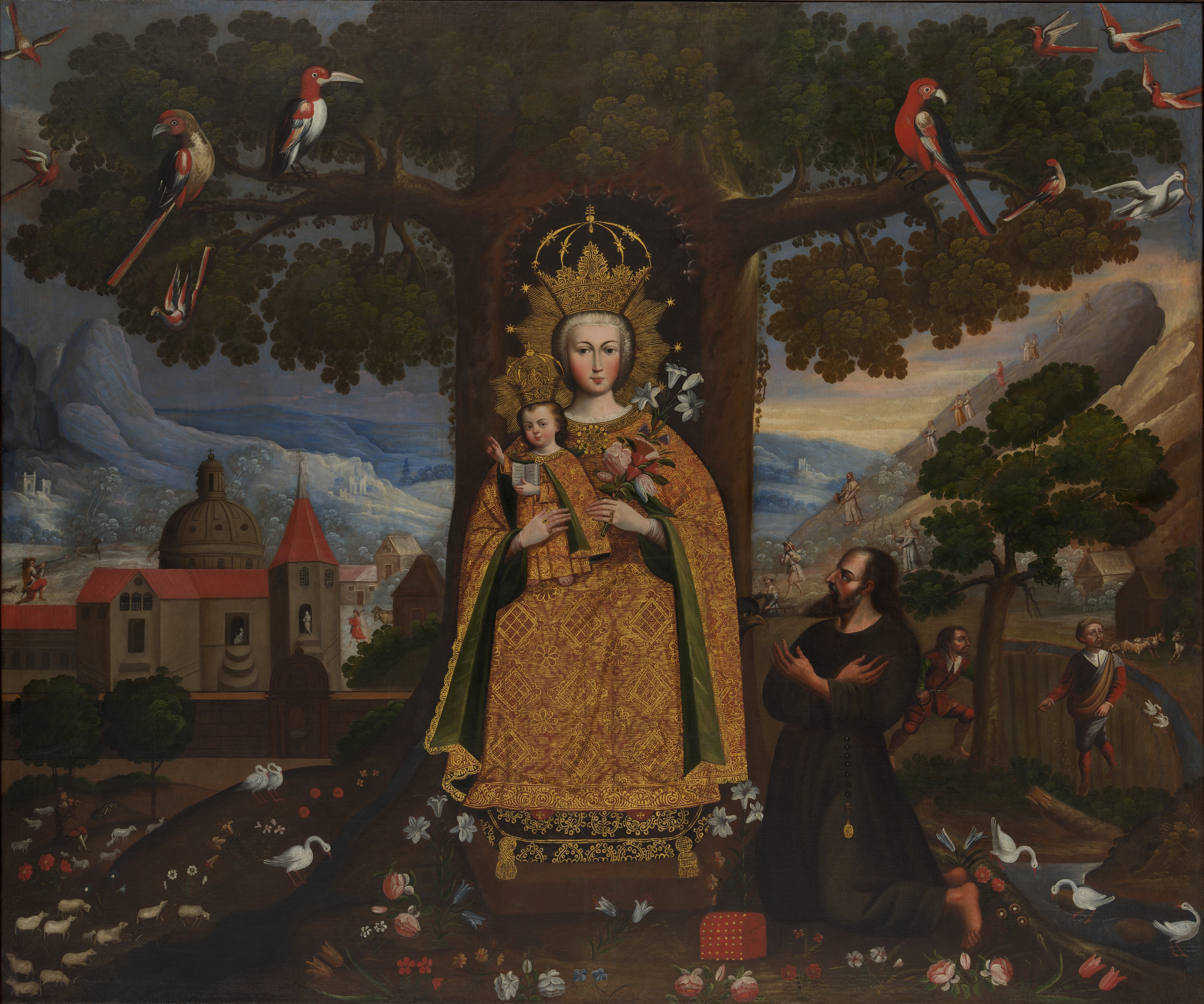
Our Lady of Valvanera, anonymous, c. 1770-80, Metropolitan Museum of Art

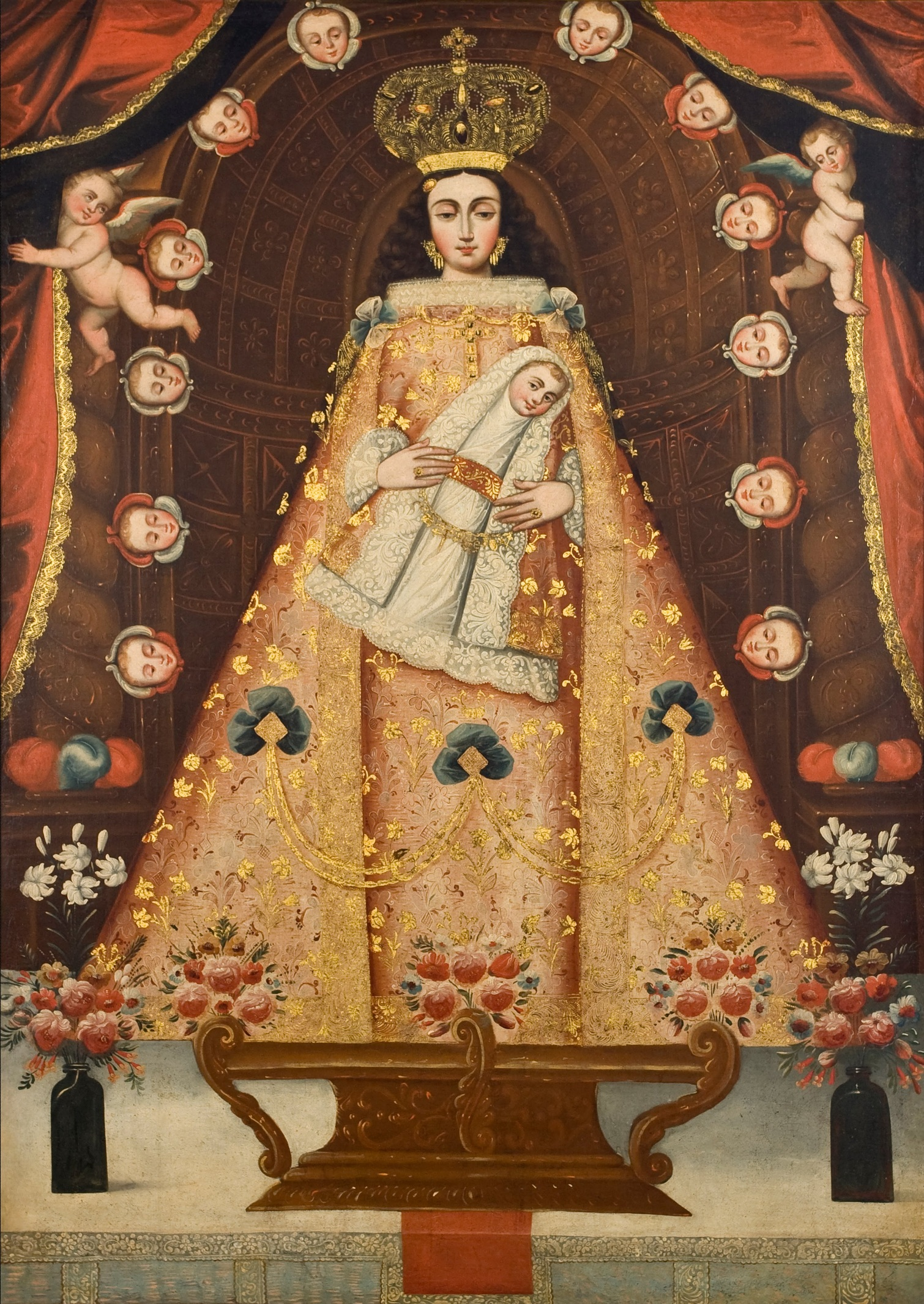
Our Lady of Bethelem, anonymous, 18th century

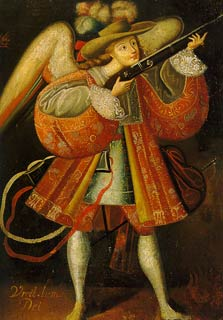
Archangel Uriel, anonymous, 18th century, featuring an Ángel arcabucero

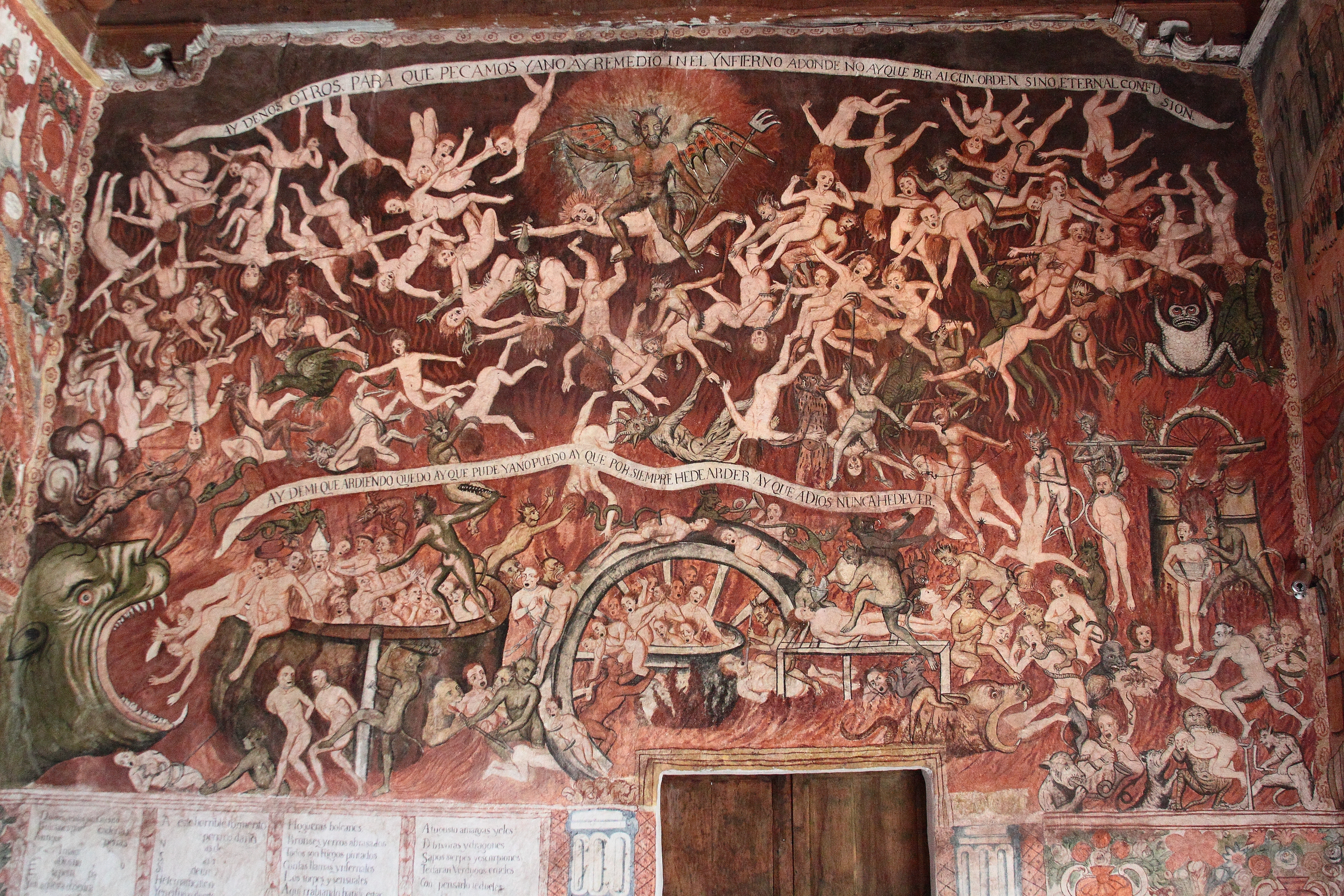
Preserved colonial wall painting of 1802 depicting Hell, by Tadeo Escalante, inside the Church of San Juan Bautista in Huaro (Peru)

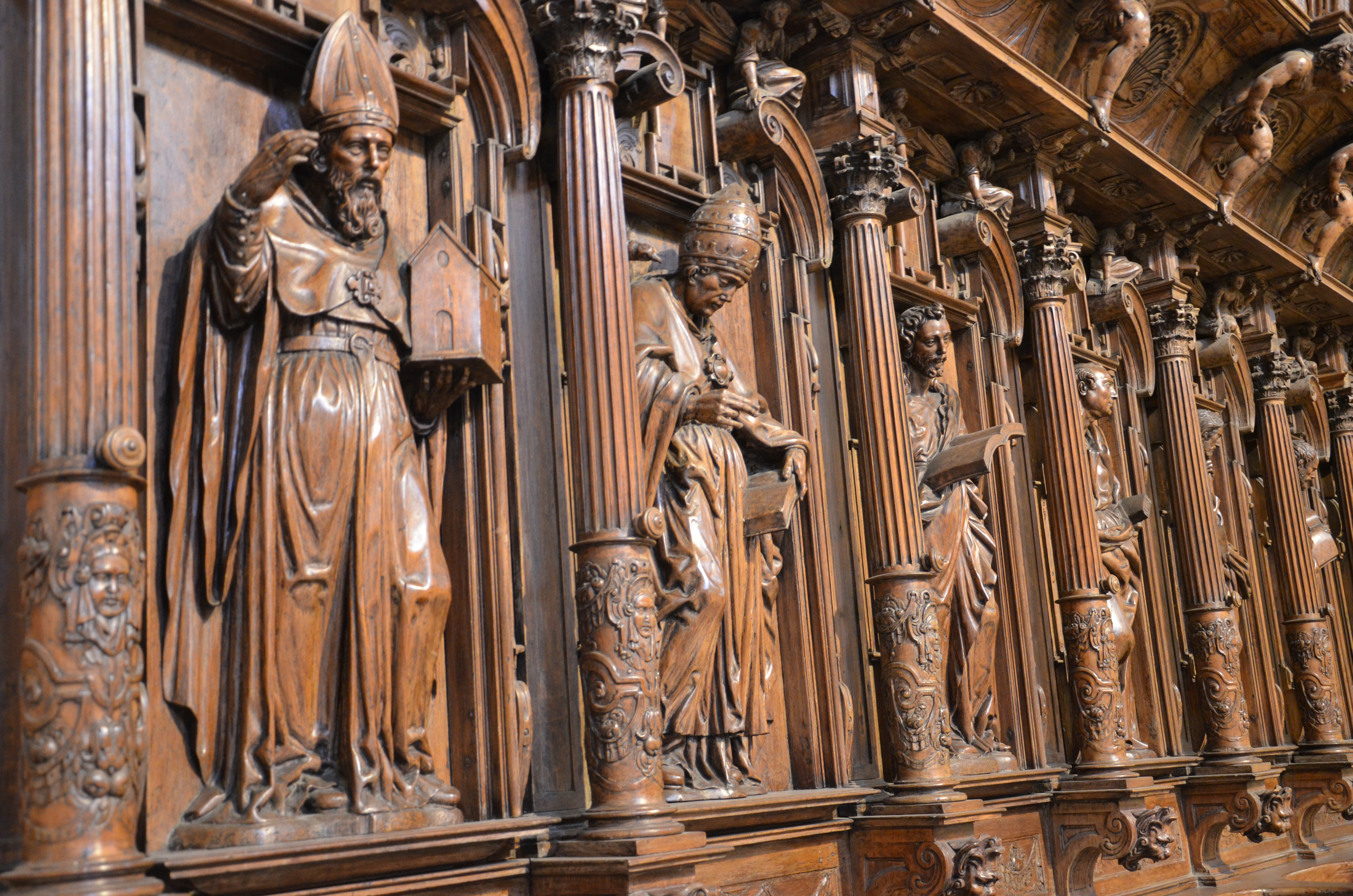
Stalls of the Cathedral choir, Pedro de Noguera

The image of Mary in Our Lady of Bethlehem hosts a lot of European styling and representations of the Western Mary. She is elevated from the ground, and is wearing a crown and has the faint image of a circular halo behind her head. She is being presented as cherubic figures pull back drapery, as if she is being "showcased." Surrounding her are small cherubic heads, often referred to as "puti's" in Southern American culture. They represent the innocence of children and act as a nod to her maternity and Jesus. She is dresses in obvious western, high-culture garments – highly adorned. Even the infant Christ is portrayed in western apparel.

== 19th century ==
Idle Woman (Perezosa) by Daniel Hernández Morillo

In the 19th century, French neoclassic and romantic currents es in L. Montero, Ignacio Merino, Daniel Hernández Morillo and Francisco Masias.

== Modern and contemporary ==
=== Indigenous movement ===
The establishment of the Fine Arts School of Lima (1919) had a decisive influence on Peruvian sculpture and painting.

In sculpture, some of the most remarkable artists include Luis Agurto, L. Valdettaro, Joaquin Roca Rey, J. Piqueras, Alberto Guzmán, Victor Delfín and F. Sánchez. Among the painters, Daniel Hernández, R. Grau, Cesar Quispez Asin and Jose Sabogal are particularly notable. Sabogal headed the indigenous movement, which was one of the main influences on Peruvian contemporary painting. Among the most notable painters in the indigenous movement was Julia Codesido. Some of the most widely recognized painters are Fernando de Szyszlo, Alberto Davila, Armando Villegas, Sabino Springett, Bernardo Rivero, J. Alberto Tello Montalvo, Victor Humareda, M. A. Cuadros, Ángel Chávez, Milner Cajahuaringa, Arturo Kubotta, Venancio Shinki, Alberto Quintanilla (wiki Es), G. Chávez, Tilsa Tsuchiya, David Herskowitz, Óscar Allain, Carlos Revilla, Sérvulo Gutiérrez and Amilcar Salomon Zorrilla (Peru).

In the field of photography, Martín Chambi made major contributions.

=== Pop art propaganda ===
During the 1960s and 1970s, Peruvian art underwent significant transformation, moving beyond traditional mediums like painting and sculpture to incorporate graphic design, poster art, and comic strip techniques. This period coincided with dramatic social and political changes, particularly the land reform initiated under General Juan Velasco Alvarado's military government. The 1969 Agrarian Reform Law aimed to redistribute land from large estates to peasant communities, challenging the longstanding feudal agrarian system. This reform catalyzed a wave of politically charged art that engaged with the struggles of Indigenous and rural communities.

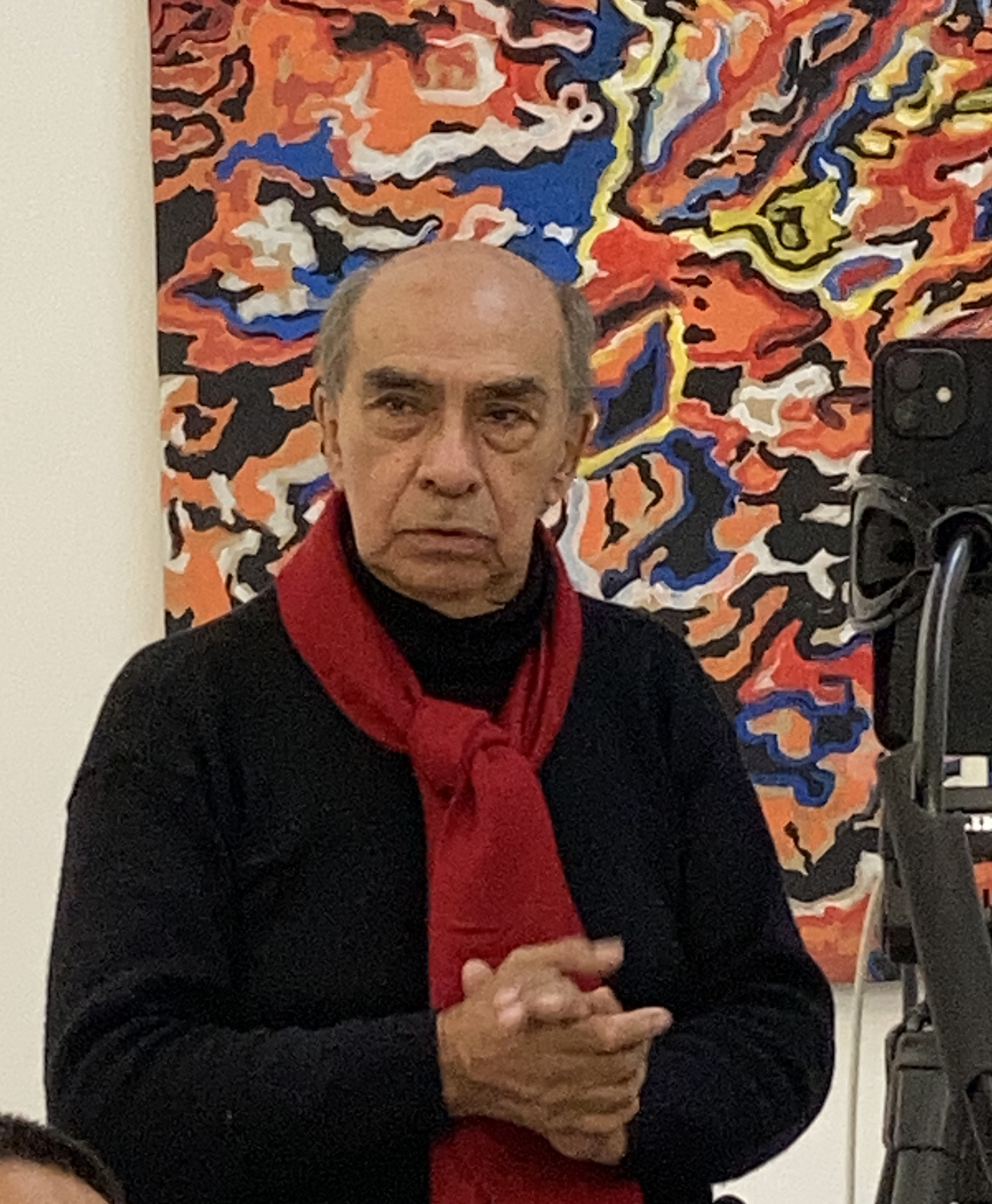
Artist Jesus Ruiz Durand at Revolver Gallery in New York. Photo by Julia Justo

Artists like Jesús Ruiz Durand played a prominent role in this movement. Ruiz Durand's posters, described as "rustic, high-circulation street posters" utilized bold graphic design and bright colors inspired by Pop Art to communicate messages of social justice, agrarian reform, and Indigenous empowerment. His art utilized images he had taken on the field and later transformed into a comic book strip style he thought anyone could understand. Reflecting on his approach, Ruiz Durand noted, "I had a very clear idea that these posters demanded an urgent, immediate, and enthusiastic message... I decided to use the comic strip technique because, who doesn't know that language?" His works, such as the poster "Tierra o Muerte" ("Land or Death"), drew directly from Velasco's slogan "Land for Those Who Work It" and were widely distributed in public spaces, fostering political discourse at both grassroots and national levels.

Agrarian reform posters often depicted rural workers reclaiming land, agricultural abundance, and the strength of Indigenous communities, reflecting a radical reimagining of Peruvian identity. For example, Ruiz Durand's "El Pueblo Unido" ("The People United") integrates imagery of campesinos wielding tools as symbols of resistance and unity. Another notable piece, "Los Campesinos Tienen la Razón" ("The Peasants Are Right"), merges Indigenous visual motifs with political slogans, emphasizing the role of rural labor in national development.

These artworks were not confined to galleries or museums; they were displayed on city walls, in town squares, and during public rallies, reaching audiences across class and geographical divides. By incorporating visual storytelling, these posters appealed to Peru's largely illiterate rural population, making them powerful tools for education and mobilization.

=== The Legacy of Revolutionary Peruvian Art ===
The art of this period left a lasting legacy on Peruvian visual culture. It bridged the gap between traditional Indigenous aesthetics and modern graphic design, contributing to a broader redefinition of national identity. While some critique these works as state propaganda, others view them as authentic expressions of grassroots resistance and empowerment. Their influence persists in contemporary Peruvian art, where themes of land rights, Indigenous identity, and social justice continue to resonate.

Even decades later, tensions surrounding development, land rights, and the representation of Indigenous communities continued. In the early 21st century, conflicts arose as the Peruvian government expanded oil and mining operations in the Amazon region, prompting organized Indigenous resistance and, at times, violent confrontations. The state's emphasis on modernity and development often overlooked Indigenous perspectives, contributing to ongoing debates over territorial integrity and environmental stewardship.

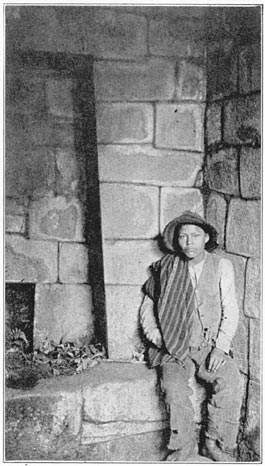
Martín Chambi photo a man at Machu Picchu, published in Inca Land. Explorations in the Highlands of Peru, 1922

=== Contemporary art ===
Teresa Burga was a multimedia artist that works with conceptual art since the 60s and 70s. She was a pioneer in media art, art and technology and installation art in Peru. She was one of the most important non-objectualist artists of those decades in Peru.

In sculpture Cristina Gálvez was one of the most influential artists and art educators. In the 1980s after the art festival Contacta 1979 the group Huayco was created by Charo Noriega, Mariella Zevallos, Maria Luy, Armando Williams, Herbert Rodriguez and Juan Javier Salazar. This group appropriated the means of production and iconography of popular aesthetics. Within the history of Contemporary Art in Peru the Third Biennial of Trujilo in 1990 played an important role. This biennial included local artists as well as artists from neighboring countries. Jorge Eduardo Eielson and Jorge Piqueras were among the exhibiting artists that returned to Peru from Europe to participate within this biennial. It was the last biennial in Trujillo. In 1992 the artist Jaime Higa presented an exhibition at The Museum of Italian Art in Lima curated by Gustavo Buntinx. The 80s were marked by the civil war and artists responded to the political situation. Among these artists are Eduardo Tokeshi, Ricardo Wiesse and Alfredo Marquez. Later on in 1997 the First Ibero American Biennial was produced in Lima directed by Luis Lama. This biennial allowed for the exchange of ideas and a wider exposure for Peruvian artists. A memorable moment within this biennial was the unexpected performance by Elena Tejada-Herrera, which became a milestone within the history of Peruvian performance art. In 1999 Tejada-Herrera was awarded the first prize in the contest Passport for and Artist with a performance for which she hired street sellers performing on the streets of Lima. Another milestone in the history of contemporary Peruvian art is the Travestite Museum created by the philosopher and drag queen Giussepe Campuzano in 2003.

=== Folk art ===
Chulucanas pottery originates in the Piura Region. Inspired by pre-Incan ceramics, the bold, graphic pottery is now exported all over the world. Designs are varied, but are predominated by black and white. There are several bigger companies but a lot of small manufactures are in Chulucanas itself and in the nearby villages of Quatro Esquinas.

The Ayacucho Region is known for its retablos, or devotional paintings. San Pedro de Cajas in Ayacucho produces collectible looms. Cusco artisans create stuffed animals and dolls. Cochas-Huancayo is known for its mate burilado gourd art, with Apolonia Dorregaray Veli considered a leading practitioner of the art form.

Folk art (specifically dance, music, and costume) is preserved at the Centro Qosqo de Arte Nativo in Cusco, which is recognized as the first folk institution of all of Peru.

== See also ==
- List of Peruvian artists
- Latin American art
