= Carlos Enrique Polanco =

Peruvian painter

- Born: 1953 (age 72–73); Lima, Peru
- Education: Escuela Nacional Superior Autónoma de Bellas Artes del Perú
- Known for: Painting, Drawing
- Style: Social expressionism, Urban surrealism
- Awards: Chinese Government Art Scholarship

Carlos Enrique Polanco (born 1953) is a notable exponent of Peruvian painting. Since his beginnings he was attracted to the less privileged urban sectors of Lima City. When he studied in School of Fine Arts, his work reflected the iconography and color of the Peruvian urban night life. Polanco is an artist with a social commitment.

Polanco gained a scholarship to study in China, where he remained for a considerable time. Then, he went to Peru with a new shrill and shining, but tender painting style.

Polanco is a cartoonist of contemporary Latin American society, portraying survivors of the urban fight, becoming the winners of the social battle.

In Peruvian expresionismo indigenista art history, Polanco is continuing the path of painters like Julia Codesido, Sérvulo Gutiérrez, Víctor Humareda and David Herskovitz.
