= Victor Martinez Malaga =

Peruvian painter

Víctor Martínez Málaga
- Born: Víctor Manuel Martínez Málaga; May 23, 1890; Arequipa, Peru
- Died: November 26, 1976 (aged 86); Arequipa, Peru
- Education: Director of the Escuela Regional de Bellas Artes
- Occupations: Artist, painter
- Spouse: Juana Francisca Gómez Muñoz
- Children: Victor Martinez Gómez, Marcelo Martínez Gómez, Alberto Martínez Gómez, and Ysabel Martínez Gómez
- Writing career
- Years active: 1920-1976
- Period: 1920-1970
- Genres: Portraiture, Landscape
- Movements: Realism, Costumbrismo

Víctor Manuel Martínez Málaga (1890–1976) was a Peruvian figurative painter, most well known for his portraits and Andean landscapes of Southern Peru. He was the director of the Escuela Regional de Bellas Artes "Carlos Bacaflor" in Arequipa, Peru.

== Biography ==
Martínez Málaga was the son of Lucas Manuel Martínez (musician and vihuela teacher) and Natividad Málaga. The early passing of his parents took him to spend part of his childhood with one of his aunts in Mollendo, the main port on the Peruvian southern coast. While in Mollendo, he started to become interested in painting and a more adventurous life which took him to Chile, where he lived for two decades. While abroad, he traveled with several theater companies with whom he traveled through Peru, Ecuador, Bolivia and Chile. He earned a living as a set designer and illustrator of movie and theater posters.

In 1918, he returned to Arequipa with a theater company and decided to establish himself back in his birth city. From then on, he dedicated himself completely to painting which he learned on his own. In Arequipa, Martínez Málaga became friends with the most prominent local painters and writers. He joined the Centro Artístico and won the most important awards in his field quickly becoming one of the members of Los Independientes, a new movement of independent painters in Peru.

The artist also spent long periods of time living in Cusco, where he established a tight friendship with the renowned Peruvian photographer, Martín Chambi Jiménez. In Cusco, Martínez Málaga also opened his first solo gallery show. He later showed his work in several solo and group exhibits in Arequipa, Puno, Lima, La Paz (Bolivia) among other cities.

In 1933, he became a teacher of fine arts at the Colegio Nacional de la Independencia. In 1951, he became professor and Director at the recently opened Escuela Regional de Bellas Artes de Arequipa until he retired in 1966. Martínez Málaga continued to paint until he died in Arequipa on November 28, 1976.

== Works ==
Between the Peruvian artists of his generation, Martínez Málaga stood out for his portraiture painting. "The human figure", noted the poet César Atahualpa Rodríguez, "has in him one of its most accomplished painters." Along with the portraits he was commissioned to create, Víctor Martínez Málaga created a prolific body of work in which he represented with mastery the farmers and working people from Arequipa and Cusco. His skill in the oil painting technique took him to also represent Costumbrismo scenes, and urban and rural landscapes of the cities where he lived. He was especially interested in his work in the study of the light.

Several of his portraits are part of the collection owned by Galería de la Municipalidad de Arequipa and Banco Wiese, while his Costumbrismo pieces are part of private collections in Arequipa, Lima, Cusco and the United States.

In 2015, el Gobierno Regional de Arequipa and Cuzzi Editores published the book Martínez Málaga in which a vast collection of his paintings and drawings are showcased. The publication was accompanied with a retrospective exhibit at the Biblioteca Regional Mario Vargas Llosa.

== Bibliography ==
- Guillen, Alberto. Algo sobre pintura peruana. En: La linterna, Arequipa, 1923.
- Castrillon Vizcarra, Alfonso. Los Independientes: distancias y antagonismos en la plástica peruana de los años 37 al 47. ICPNA, Lima, 2000.
- Ruid Rosas, Alfonso (edición y textos). Martínez Málaga. Arequipa, Gobierno Regional, 2013.
- Zevallos, Omar. Los Acuarelistas ArequipeÃ±os 1840-1940. Arequipa, Cuzzi Editores, 2013.
