= Harry Roldán Pinedo Valera =

Peruvian painter

Harry Pinedo
- Inin Metsa
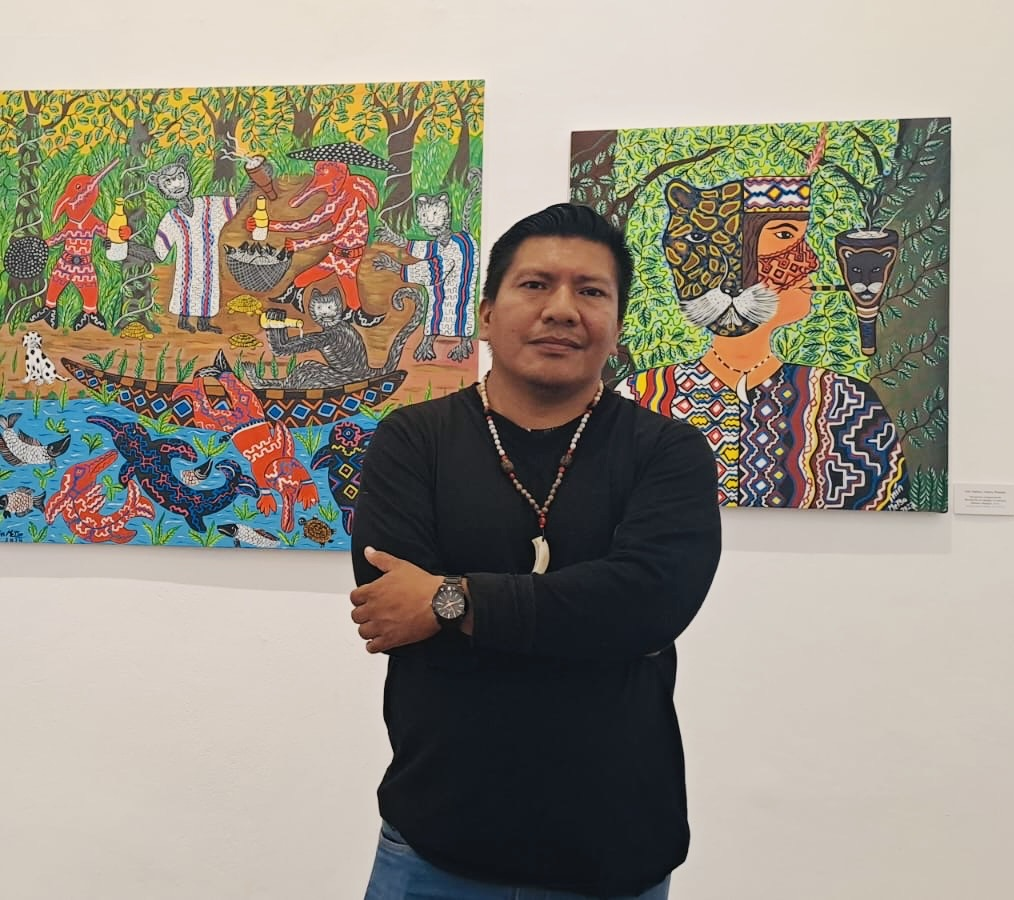
- Harry Pinedo Valera (2024)
- Born: Harry Roldán Pinedo Valera; May 11, 1988 (age 38); Pucallpa, Peru
- Education: Cayetano Heredia University
- Known for: Indigenous Amazonian painting
- Notable work: El Jaguar, Melodías desde la canoa, Árbol de huayruros, Sol y luna en la mañana, Visión de lagartijas, Mujer de la medicina
- Style: Contemporary indigenous art, visionary art, Naïve art, spiritual painting
- Movement: Amazonian indigenism

Harry Roldán Pinedo Valera (Harry Pinedo), in the language of the Shipibo-Conibo Inin Metsa, (born May 11, 1988, in Pucallpa) is a contemporary Peruvian artist of indigenous painting.

== Life ==
=== Development and artistic influence ===
Pinedo learned to design and incorporate missing pictorial elements as an assistant to his parents Elena Valera and Roldán Pinedo, who are also artists. Over the years, he developed his own style of painting and became an artist himself. In 2020, Pinedo received a bachelor's degree in pedagogy for bilingual intercultural education at the Cayetano Heredia University and has since taught at the Shipibo Community School in Cantagallo.

Pinedo belongs to the Shipibo people of Ucayali in the Peruvian Amazon region and has been working in Lima since 1995, where he lives in the Shipibo urban community of Cantagallo. He is a representative of indigenous art whose theme is the jungle world of South America.

The artistic influence therefore stems less from other indigenous artists than from the examination of nature in its balance of fauna and flora on the one hand and the indigenous peoples living symbiotically with and in it on the other.

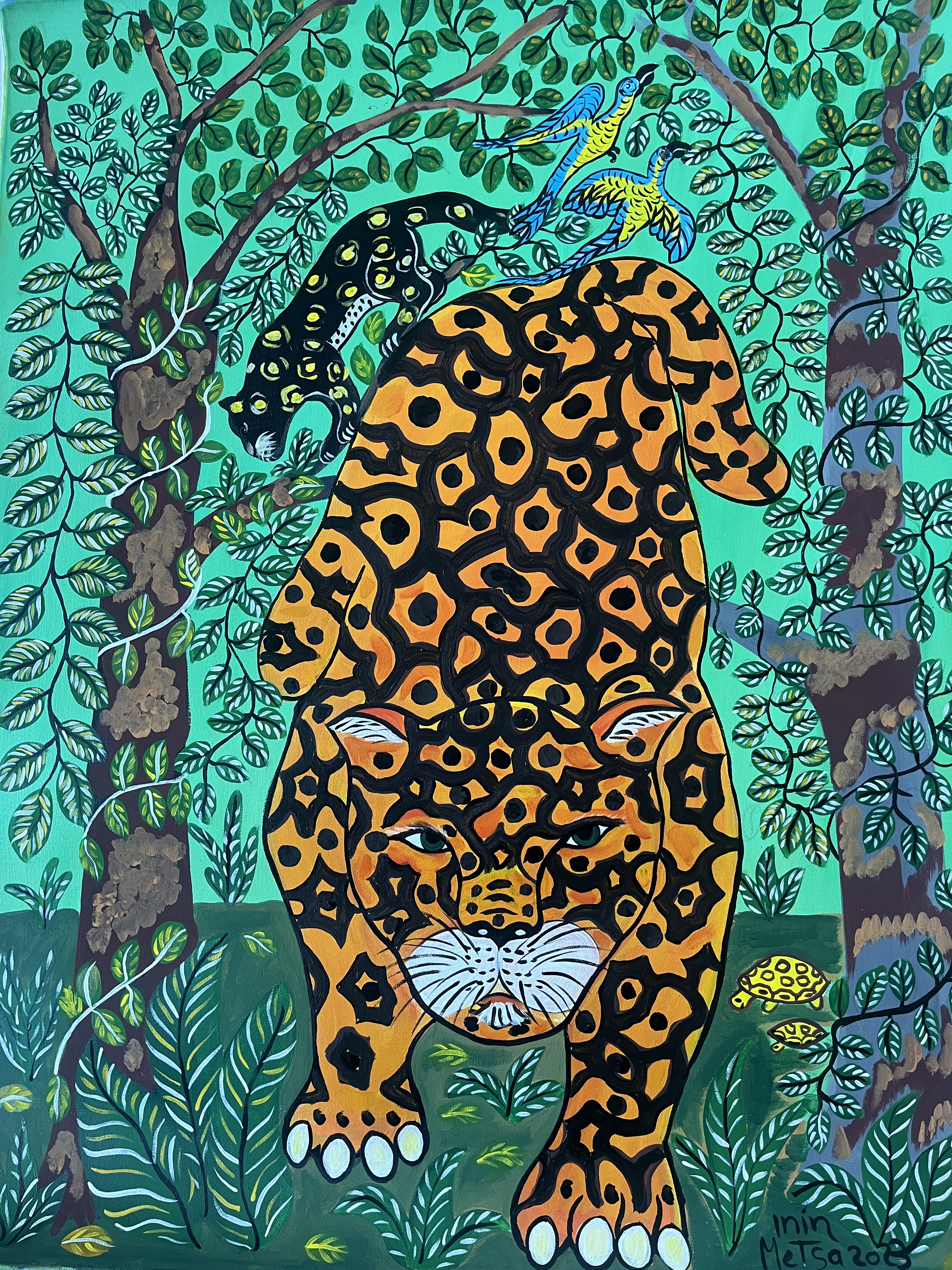
El Jaguar (2023)

The movement of painterly indigenism developed in Peru in the middle of the 20th century. However, while earlier indigenous painters had focused exclusively on the Andean man, Pinedo takes up the jungle dweller and his world into his works. Similar to Naïve Art, these are simple and imaginative pictorial motifs whose origins, however, come from shamanistic context and give the pictorial motif a spiritual interpretation. Pinedo incorporates his own experiences from the use of the Ayahuasca drug into his visionary painting and visualizes indigenous ideas of spirits and spiritual entities such as animals and plants of the rainforest.

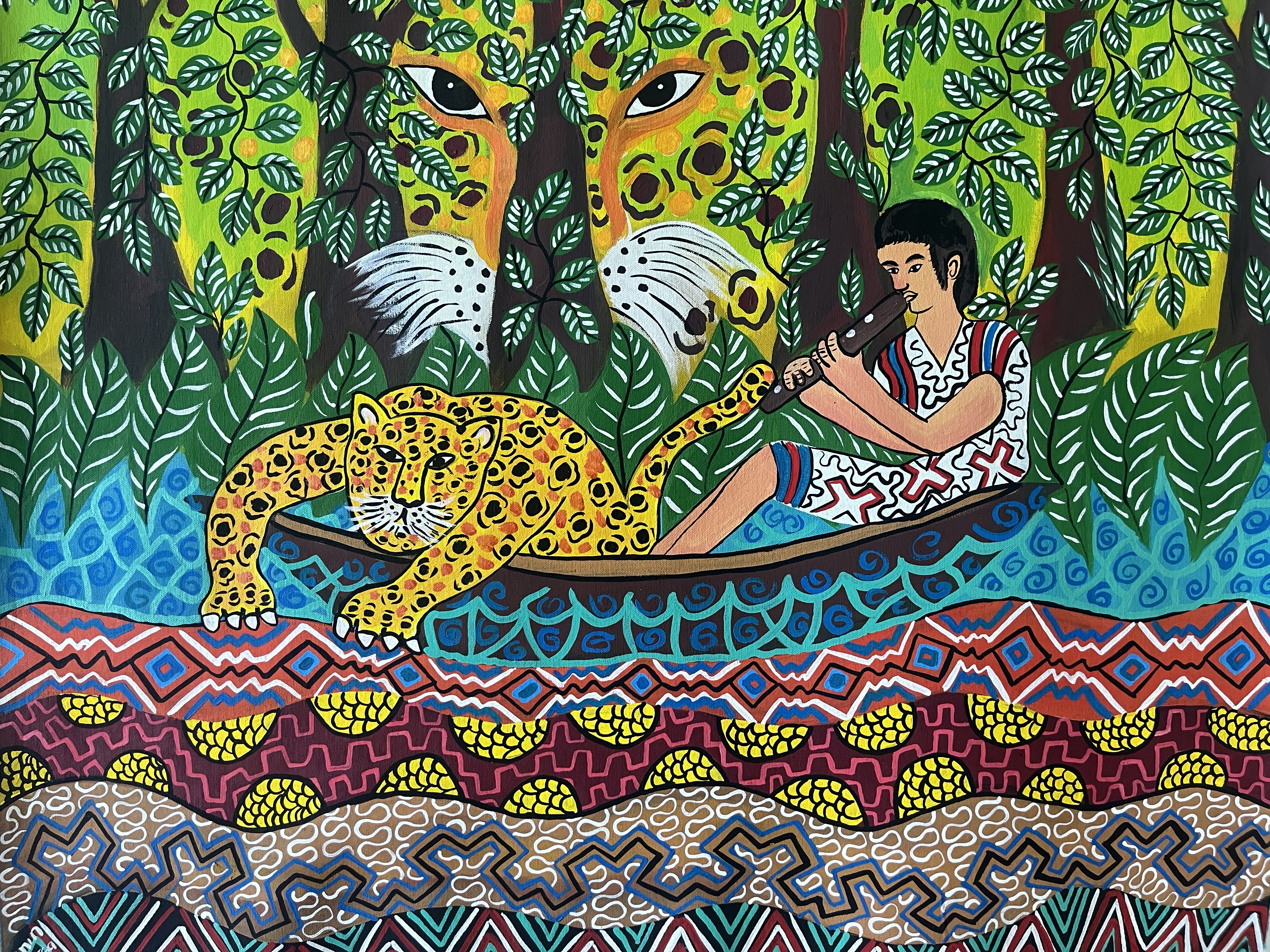
Melodías desde la canoa (2023)

As with Naïve Art, these are simple, two-dimensional depictions of fauna and flora; however, one of the hallmarks of his painting are the patterns from the animal world that repeatedly emerge, which can be found in many different ways in his works and are interpreted as the unconditionality of human life dependent on nature. Ideally, it is a mutually dependent symbiosis of man and nature: his works therefore also contain elements of social criticism, but these should be understood as a call to respect and preserve nature and the rainforest as the basis of life instead of destroying it.

=== Style and techniques ===
In his homeland, Pinedo learned the art of indigenous painting with brushes made from Piri piri branches or Ronsoco hair, using the local soil to obtain his colors and using the simple tocuyo as fabric, which is dyed with essences from the bark of the mahogany tree. In this way, Pinedo tries to capture the magic and mystery of the inhabitants of the jungle and to fix the oral traditions of the Shipibo-Conibo people with color and form. In addition to natural paints from his own production, acrylic paints are used for large formats.

=== Exhibitions (selection) ===
- 2025 Listening to the Voices of the Rivers, Newcastle
- 2024 Pinta Miami – The Latin American Gene, Miami
- 2023 “healing”, Museum der Weltkulturen Frankfurt
- 2022 „Perú en mi Corazon”, Galerie Maggy Stein, Luxembourg
- 2021 “Place-Making, World-Making”, University of Essex
- 2020 Amazonia Arte e Identidad, Boulevard Art Gallery Asia, Lima
- 2019 ARCOmadrid, „Gastland Peru. Amazonas”, Madrid
- 2018 Ruraq Maki, Museo de la Nación, Lima
- 2017 El Explendor de Yanapuma, Centro Colich de Barranco, Lima
- 2016 BAZARTE, Lima Contemporáneo en Fundación Euroidiomas, Lima
- 2014 “La Peinture Contemporaine de I´Amazonie Peruvienne”, Maison des Associations, Paris
- 2013 Mira! – Artes Visuales Contemporáneo de los Pueblos Indigenas. Cultural Center of the University of Minas de Grey, Belo Horizonte
- 2011 “Amazonia I”, Sala Ricardo Palma of the Miraflores District, Lima
- 2010 “Noche de Arte 2010”, BBVA Banco Continental, San Isidro, Lima
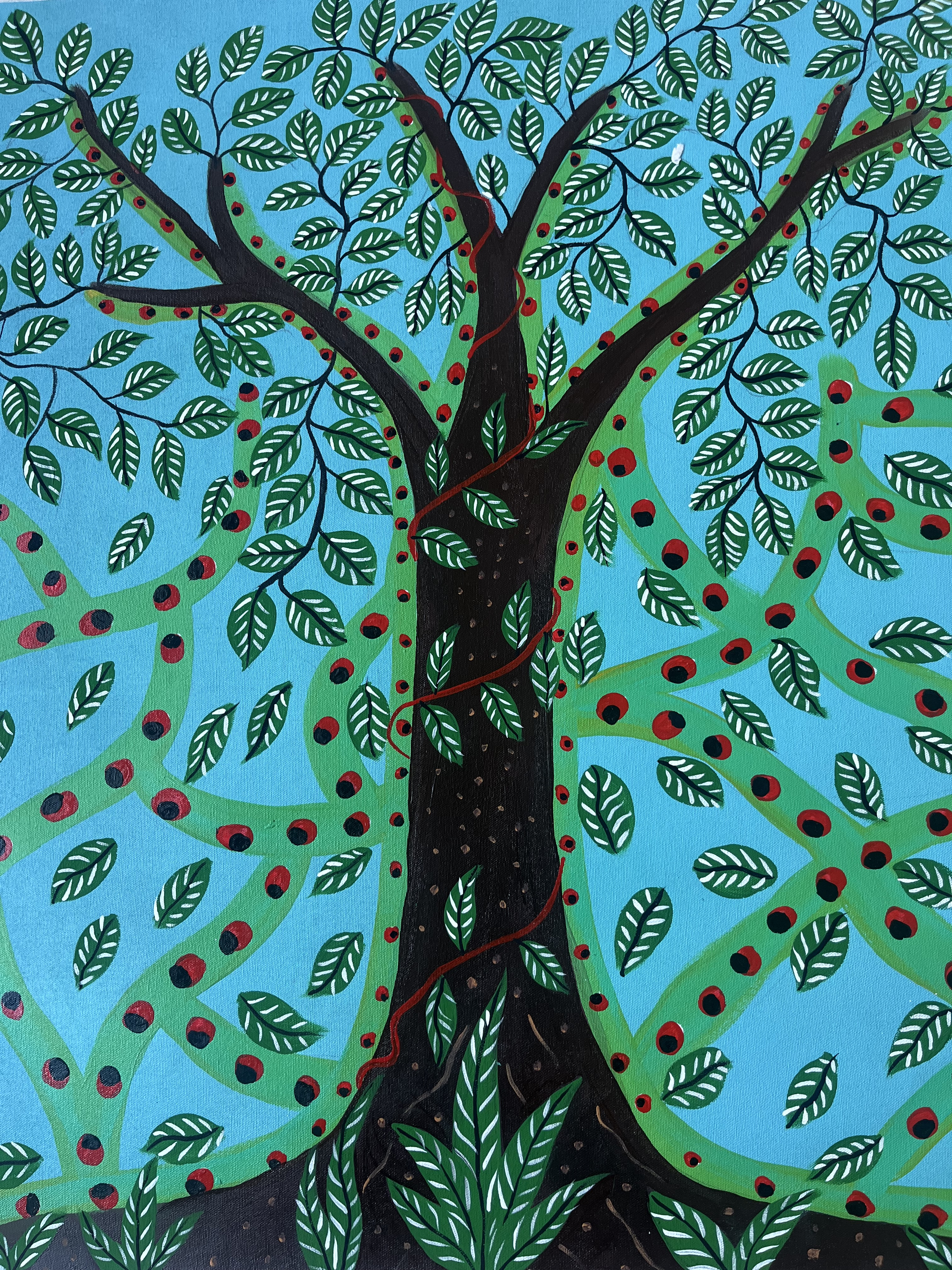
Árbol de huayruros (2023)

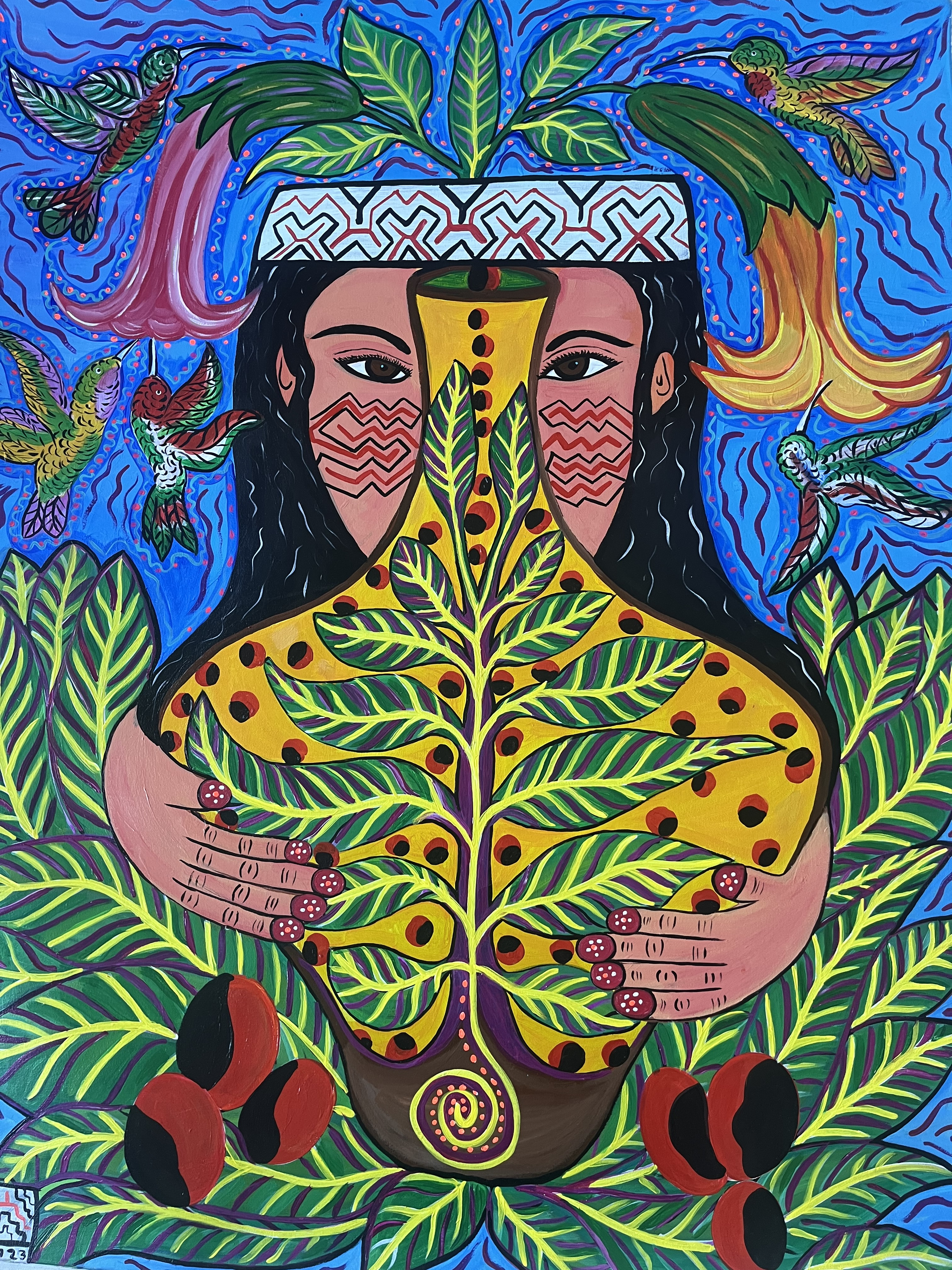
Mujer de la medicina (2023)

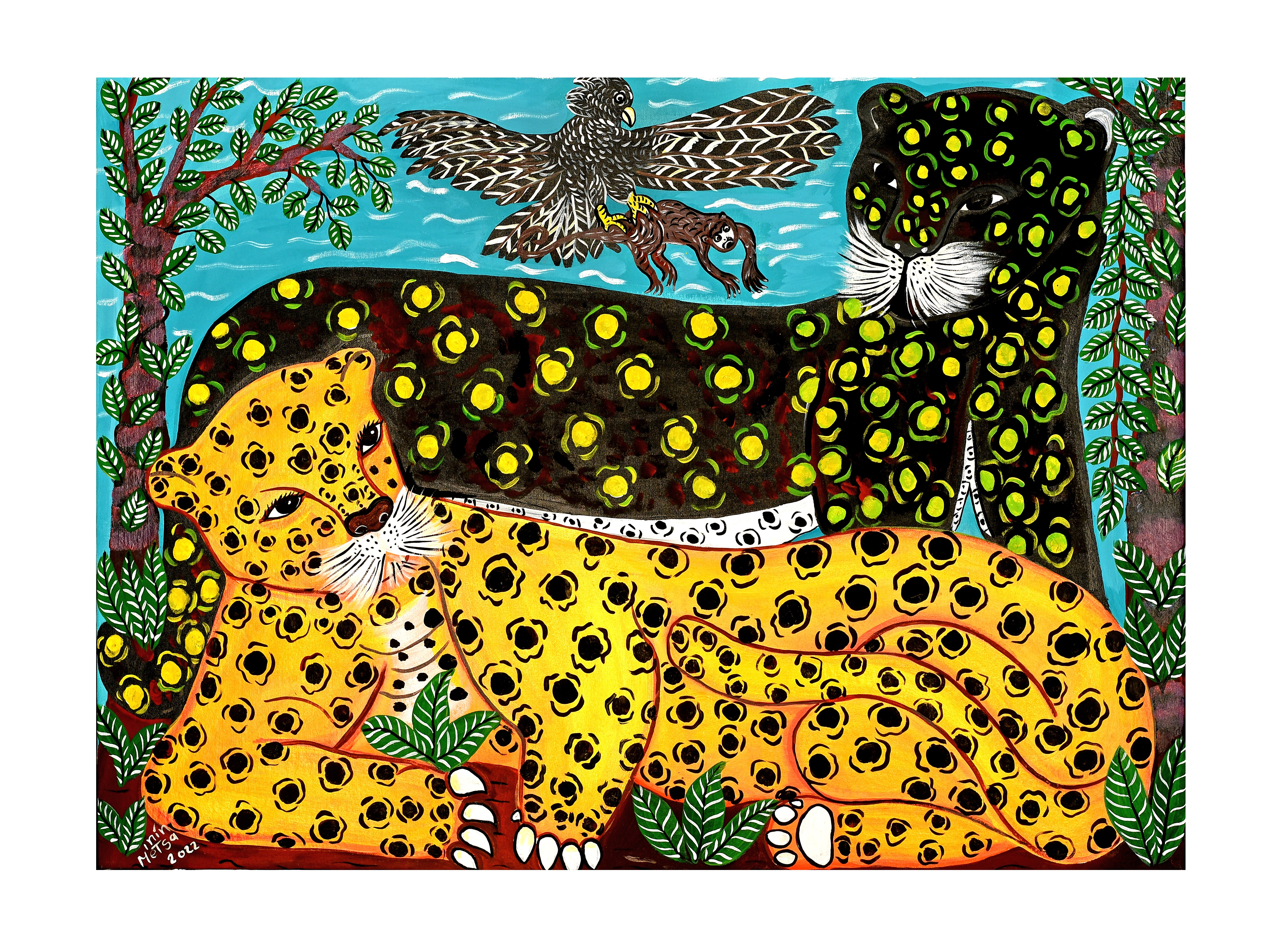
Sol y luna en la mañana (2022)

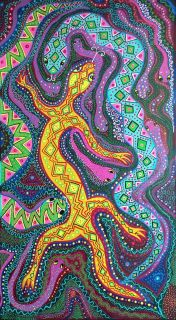
Visión de lagartijas (2022)

== Works in public collections ==
- Museum der Weltkulturen, Frankfurt
- Cayetano Heredia University, Lima
- Ministry of Culture, Lima

== Literature ==
- Listening to the Voices of the Rivers, in: Newcastle Contemporary Art, Accompanying words to the exhibition from Oktober 30, to November 22, 2025.
- healing. Accompanying booklet to the exhibition „Live in balance“ from November 2, 2022, to September 3, 2023, in the Museum of World Cultures (Weltkulturen Museum), Frankfurt am Main.
- Giuliana Borea and Rember Yahuarcani: Amazonian Waterway, Amazonian Water-Worlds: Rivers in Government Projects and Indigenous Art, in: Liquid Ecologies in Latin American and Caribbean Art (edited by Lisa Blackmore and Liliana Gómez 2020), p. 106–124.
- Harry Pinedo Valera: El esplendor de Yana Puma, in: El Comercio dated January 26, 2017.
- Oscar G. Pamo Reyna: De La Selva, Su Pintor: Harry Pinedo Valera, in: Acta Herediana Vol. 60, abril – setiembre 2017, p. 83–86.
- Harry Pinedo / ININ METSA. Pertenece al pueblo Shipibo de Ucayali en la Amazonía de Perú, in: DESIGNER Magazine dated July 29, 2021.
