= Centro Qosqo de Arte Nativo =

Cultural institution in Cusco, Peru

- CQAN logo

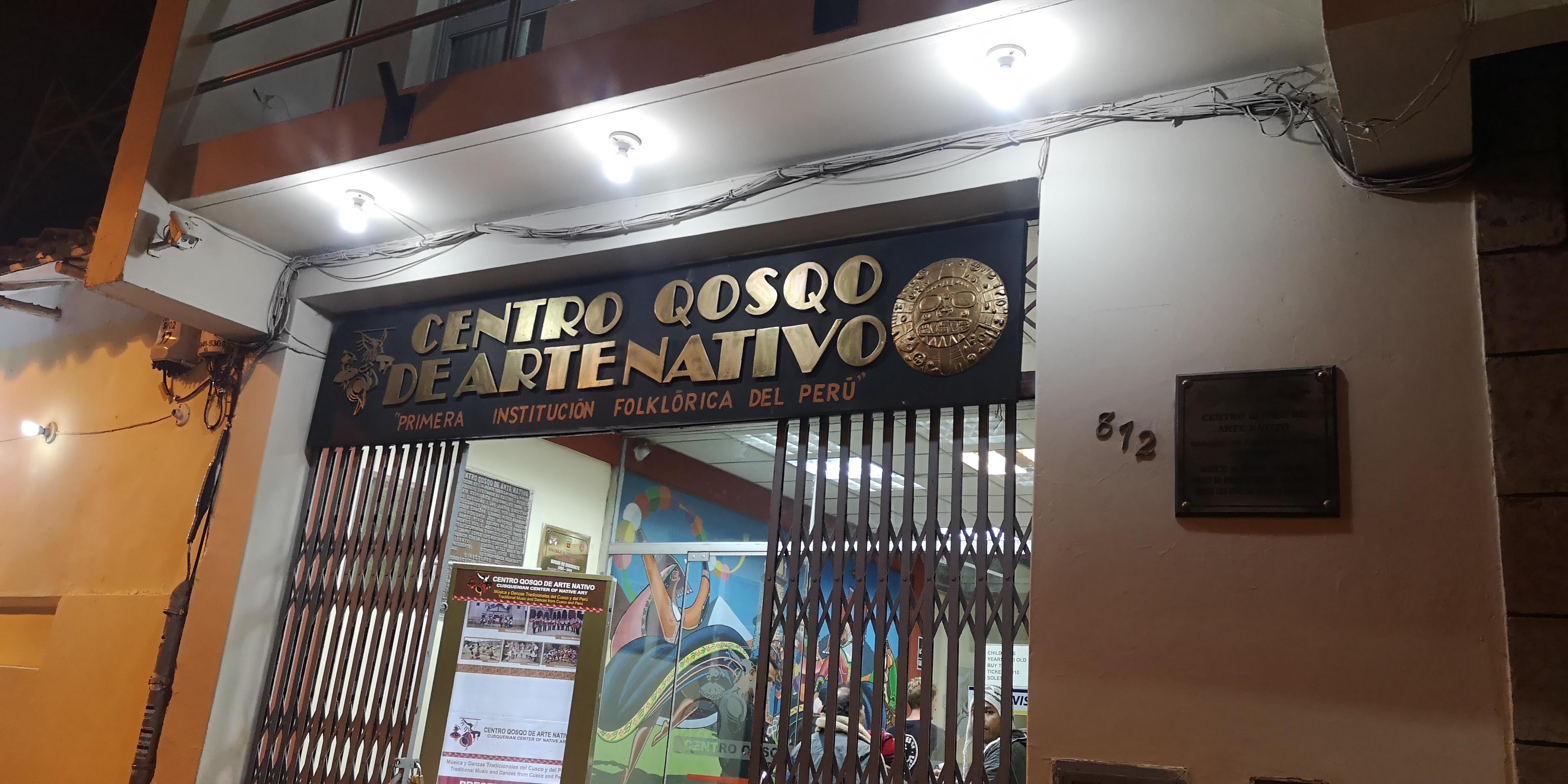
- Entrance to the headquarters of Centro Qosqo
- Abbreviation: CQAN
- Formation: November 6, 1924; 101 years ago
- Founder: Luis Alberto Pardo Durand
- Type: Cultural institution
- Purpose: Collection and preservation of folk music and dances from the Cusco Region
- Headquarters: Cusco, Peru
- President (2019): Mateo Jara Santiesteban
- Website: Official website
- Formerly called: Centro Musical Cusco (1924-1933)

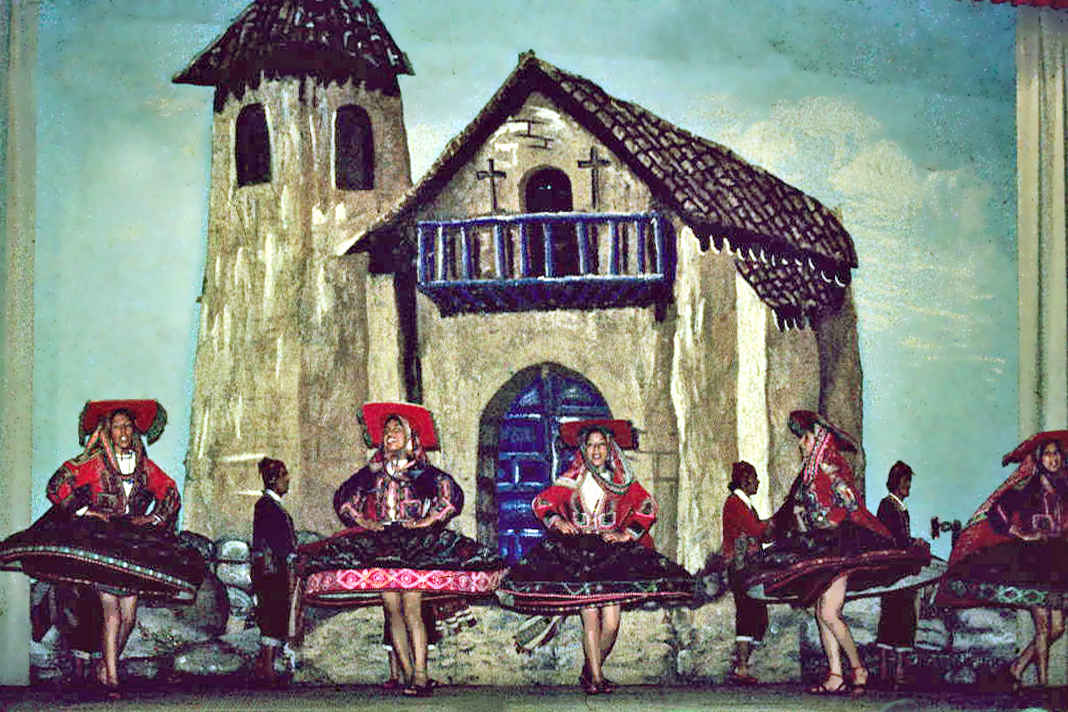
Performance in 1981 at the Centro Qosqo de Arte Nativo

The Centro Qosqo de Arte Nativo is a folk art cultural institution based in the city of Cusco, Peru. It is the first Cusqueñan organization dedicated to promoting regional and national folk art. Its purpose is the collection and preservation of folk music and dances from the Cusco Region. The organization currently operates a venue on Avenida El Sol, where it holds daily music and dance performances. Its repertoire includes more than 50 dances and also maintains a museum of traditional costumes from the region. It is considered by the people of Cusco to be the principal and most respected cultural institution for the promotion of folklore and was recognized by the Peruvian government as the "first folkloric institution of Peru."

== Sources ==
- Mendoza, Zoila (2006). Crear y sentir lo nuestro: folclor, identidad regional y nacional en el Cuzco, siglo XX (in Spanish) (First ed.). Lima: Fondo Editorial de la PUCP. ISBN 9972-42-770-6.
