= Andrea Hamilton =

Peruvian artist

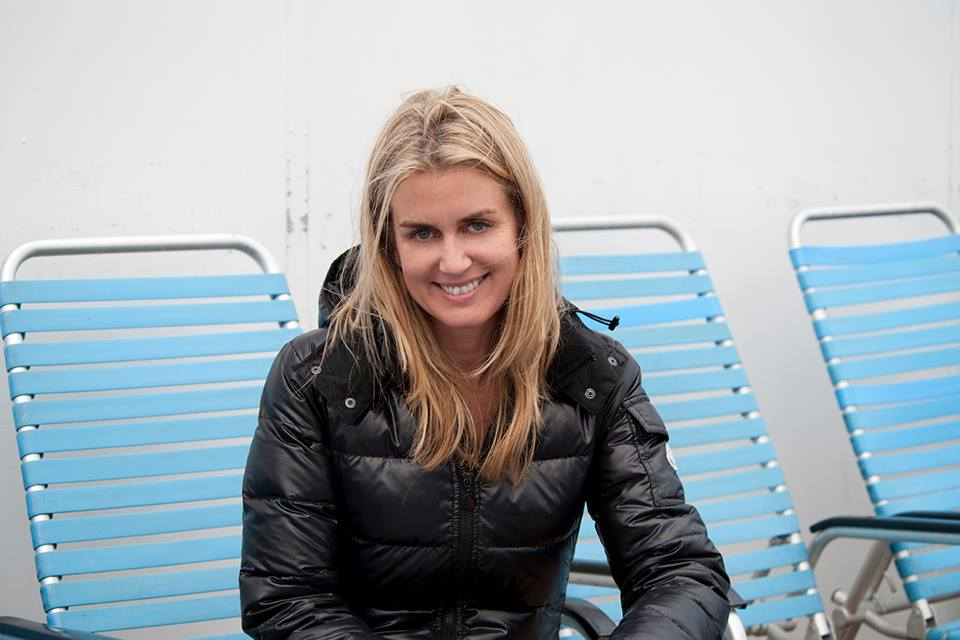
Hamilton in 2016

Andrea Jarvis Hamilton (born in 1968) is a conceptual artist and fine-art photographer best known for her extensive series of photographic images of the ocean, natural phenomena and the Kelvin scale. Her work encompasses the long term, systematic collection of subjects within a strict conceptual framework, creating expansive archives. These are retrospectively organised according to common visual characteristics (movement, colour, light) into series which highlight certain themes: the nature of time and memory, climate change, colour theory and being. Her work also encompasses still life, long exposure, landscape and portraiture, street photography and landscape.

Hamilton has been short-listed for several notable photography prizes including the 7th Julia Margaret Cameron Award for Women Photographers, Chantel Paul’s Honorable Mention at The Centre for Fine Art Photography in Colorado, the 9th Arte Laguna Prize and the Judges Choice at the AOP Open Awards 2013.

== Biography ==
Hamilton was born in Peru but by her teens had lived in Mexico City, Minneapolis and London. She studied law at university before joining S.G. Warburg as an Equity Analyst in Latin American Mining. After leaving to have a family, Hamilton did not return to business, but studied photography at Photofusion and traditional print methods at the Black and White School. As well as working as an artist, Hamilton also runs AHStudio, an art space based in Belgravia which was established in 2014.

== Artistic style ==
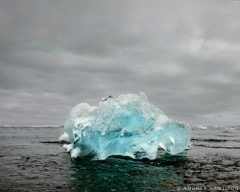
Luminous Icescapes series, 2013-2014

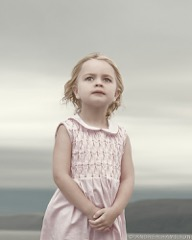
Portrait from the Wondrous Strange series

Hamilton works across multiple photographic genres including fine art, landscape, urban photography and street photography. Her 2019 show Chroma revealed her interest in typology and archiving: "Hamilton’s new pieces are from an extraordinary and expansive photographic catalogue of seascapes called Seachroma: water and sky observed and shot in natural light over a 20-year period".

Hamilton's works frequently examine the durational capacity of photography which implies the contingency of both past and future as related in Roland Barthes’ notion of time. On one hand, Hamilton detains the landscape in a sort of infinite present that transforms the image into a haiku poem, as it occurs in her series Tidal Resonance, shown at Delahunty in 2014. On the other hand, her portraits remind the audience that posing in front of the camera references the future, emphasising the timelessness and dignity of her subjects, as seen in her surreal portraits of children in Wondrous Strange.

Hamilton also employs photography to create images that bring out the emotional potential of an environment, achieving images that are both personal and universal. Her street photography is driven by "the prospect of witnessing something special and spontaneous", as evidenced in her London Every Day series in which a daily snapshot of London shows the changing seasons. Her street photography is notable for its acute sensitivity to and understanding of natural light, and its ability to morph the ordinary into something strange and sometimes otherworldly.

== Books ==
Hamilton has published three books of photographs. Her first, AH20, published in 2014, collects together the works created under the series Tidal Resonance and Luminous Icescapes, and includes an introduction by Rabih Hage and essays by Anthony Downey and Ben Eastham.

In 2015 she was one of the photographers commissioned to photograph London's creative scene for the book London Burning: Portraits from a Creative City. The book includes interviews and photographs of various creative personalities including Edmund de Waal, Tamara Rojo, Hans-Ulrich Obrist and Matthew Slotover.

The book London Every Day includes street photography and looks at the beauty and creativity of regular life and was commissioned by The Mayor’s Fund for London. London Every Day includes an introduction by Charlotte Cotton, plus images choices and contributions from David Adjaye, John Frieda, Anish Kapoor, Sir Elton John, Mary McCartney, Martin Sorrell and Charlize Theron among others.

== Exhibitions ==
- 2011 The Art Council Annual Juried Exhibition, USA - group show
- 2011 Old Court House Arts Center, USA - group show
- 2012 Sony World Photography Awards 2012 - group show
- 2012 The Royal Photographic Society 155th International Print Exhibition - group show
- 2014 Delahunty Fine Art, UK - solo show Water Works
- 2014 Bayeux, UK - solo show, selection of works
- 2015 9th International Arte Laguna Prize, Italy - group show
- 2015 The Center for Fine Art Photography, USA - group show Landscapes
- 2015 London Every Day, London City Hall, UK - group show
- 2016 Art Southampton Pavilion Art/Bastion Gallery, New York - group show
- 2016 The Blue Edition. 68 Kinnerton Street, London
- 2019 Artists for Blue (group show). 68 Kinnerton Street, London.
- 2019 Chroma. 127 Sloane Street, London.

== Prizes ==
- 2011 AOP Open Awards 2011 - Shortlist
- 2013 AOP Open Awards 2013 - Judges Choice
- 2014 International Photography Awards (IPA) – Honorable Mention
- 2014 Royal Photographic Society, UK – Finalist
- 2015 9th International Arte Laguna Prize, Italy – Finalist
- 2015 Landscape Awards, The Center for Fine Art Photography, USA - Juror's Honorable Mention
- 2015 7th Julia Margaret Cameron Award for Women Photographers - finalist
- 2020 Tokyo Foto Awards (TIFA) – Gold, Advertisement, Travel/Tourism; Gold, Science and Environment; Silver, Editorial and Environment
- 2021 ITSLIQUID International Competition 8th Edition, Winner
