= Urban Surrealism =

Art movement

Urban Surrealism is a significant art movement across various disciplines including architecture, drawing and painting, literature, music and drama, where emphasizing the unorthodox, bizarre and novelty parts of an artistic piece, while retaining simplicity, is key. It is inspired by comedy and satire, and has an amusing personality as a genre. A key feature of urban surrealism is its humorous take on the upper class, suggesting that despite its high-quality output, the art form is created in a casual manner that may appeal to the aristocracy.
