= Regina Aprijaskis =

Peruvian painter

Regina Aprijaskis (1919 – 2013) was a French artist established in Peru.

== Biography ==
=== Infancy and youth ===
Aprijaskis was born in Burdeos (France) in the year of 1919. At five, she moved with her parents to the city of Lima, Peru.

In Lima, she continued her studies at the Castaneda Sisters school, but left that school to continue her training in the Autonomous Upper National School of Fine Arts of Peru, where she was then directed by José Sabogal.

=== Training ===
Aprijaskis studied plastic arts in the School of Fine Arts of Lima, where she had remarkable indigenous painters as mentors. Her first years were marked by the teachings of Camilo Blas, with whom she started learning the foundations of figurative painting; José Sabogal, with whom she started to work with nude paintings; and she formed a profound friendship with Julia Codesido.

In the 1950s, she travelled to New York where she grew fond of the work of Mark Rothko and Barnett Newman. In the 1960s, she received training in the abstract expressionist painter Theodoros Stamos's workshop. The influence of this stay in the United States, which lasted almost 18 years, was decisive for the change of direction in her work about geometrical abstraction.

== Work ==
=== The Paracas series ===
In 1968, she had her first individual exhibition at the Institute of Contemporary Art of Lima, where she showed the pictorial Paracas series. The works in this show would be the basis of her later paintings. The show was chosen by Peruvian art critic Juan Acha for its vanguard and rationalist efforts.

To quote the Peruvian critic Jorge Villacorta, "the work of Aprijaskis constitutes one of the few solid proposals of geometric abstraction or on the base of constructivist principles that have developed in the panorama of Peru's visual arts."
