= César Yauri Huanay =

Peruvian painter (born 1962)

César Yauri Huanay (born 1962 in Ahuaycha District, Peru) is a Peruvian painter.
