= Sérvulo Gutiérrez =

Peruvian painter (1914–1961)

Sérvulo Gutiérrez. The Andes (1943).

Sérvulo Gutiérrez Alarcón (1914 – 21 July 1961) was a Peruvian artist, described by The Times as "Peru’s most celebrated painter". He was initially untaught and self-educated, but then trained under the artist Emilio Pettoruti. Gutiérrez had a relationship with Doris Gibson.

== Life ==
Sérvulo Gutiérrez was born in Ica. He had little in the way of normal education and initially trained in Lima to be a boxer. He moved to Buenos Aires, where he focused on pottery of the Pre-Columbian period, establishing premises to both conserve such items as well as to manufacture new ones in the tradition of that style.

Gutiérrez was self-taught until he had the opportunity to study in Buenos Aires for eight years with the major Argentine painter, Emilio Pettoruti (1892–1971). He travelled to Paris in 1938, where the study of work by French artists broadened his approach away from an academic direction towards a delineated and sculptural Expressionist style, which he pursued after his return to Peru in 1942. Gutiérrez' masterpiece is a depiction of a powerful and crude nude woman, The Andes (1943), representing "the unavoidable South American reality." He was not an intellectual and this may explain how the tenor of his work is that of a "direct, living testimony."

His interest in sculpture was stimulated by his apprenticeship under Pettoruti, and although he did not produce many works of this kind, his sculpture Amazonia won first prize in a competition in 1942.

The influence of other European avant-garde styles did not affect him, and for some time he incorporated the influence of the Peruvian Indigenist manner in his work. Subsequently, his Expressionist tendencies intensified with techniques such as scoring the paint surface to create textural effects and heightening his colours with gestural marks of black, red, blue and green paint, leading at the beginning of the 1950s to such works such as Don Juan (1952). This direction intensified with a violent Fauvist manner into mystical subjects, including St Rosa de Lima (c. 1960–61).

Gutiérrez had a relationship with Doris Gibson, who was a muse to him as well as a lover. After an argument between them, he sold a full-size nude painting, which he had done of her, to a well-off businessman. Gibson arrived at the businessman's house with a photographer and, on the pretext of needing daylight for a photograph, took the painting outside and promptly drove away with it. When he later asked for its return, she responded, "I don't want to be nude in your house."

He died in Lima on 21 July 1961.

== See also ==
- Peruvian arts
- List of Peruvian artists
- Latin American art
