= Mario Urteaga Alvarado =

Peruvian painter (1875–1957)

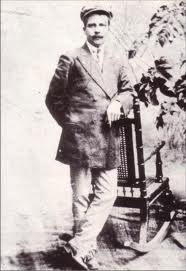
- Born: Mario Urteaga; April 1, 1875; Cajamarca Perú, Cajamarca Region
- Died: June 12, 1957 (aged 82); Cajamarca
- Known for: Painter of peruvian native themes
- Notable work: La riña - The Fight; El primer corte de pelo - The first haircut Los tejeros - The weavers
- Style: Indigenism

Urteaga Alvarado, Mario (April 1, 1875 – June 12, 1957) was a Peruvian painter. He originally worked as a painter, photographer and upon his return to his native Cajamarca from Lima he worked as a school teacher, farming and journalist.

Unlike his Indigenism colleagues, trained in the Escuela Nacional de Bellas Artes in Lima, Urteaga was a self-taught artist and had developed the central work of his paintings in Cajamarca. This circumstance contributed to shaping the image of the artist as a topical spontaneous product of his environment and to project an ambivalent perception of his work, sometimes classified as non-academic and as a manifestation of the independent indigenousness. With a blend of classicism and naturalness, his peasant scenes—carefully composed by the artist—were fascinating to the viewer of his time; they seemed to embody the outermost reaches of the nationalist aspirations of an entire generation, through which Urteaga succeeded in showing the world "the most Indian Indians ever painted", as Teodoro Núñez Ureta concludes.

His spontaneity and topicality are reminiscent of the caricatures of Pancho Fierro, yet his representation of the indigenous peoples of Peru and their daily life is serious. He is considered to be the first painter to portray Indian people without patronizing them, as can be seen in the Adobe Makers (1937, priv. col.) and Return of the Peasants (Lima, Mus. A.). An exhibition of his work was held at the Banco de la Nación, Lima, in 1989.

He was the first Peruvian painter with a work in the "MOMA" of New York City.

Urteaga died in 1957 in Cajamarca.
