= Tilsa Tsuchiya =

Peruvian printmaker and painter

- Born: Tilsa Tsuchiya Castillo; September 24, 1928; Supe near Lima, Peru
- Died: September 23, 1984 (aged 55); Lima, Peru
- Education: Escuela Nacional de Bellas Artes (1959), École des Beaux Arts, La Sorbonne
- Known for: Painting, printmaking
- Spouse: Charles Mercier
- Awards: Premio Bienal de Pintura Teknoquímica, Segundo Premio del Salón Municipal, Primera Bienal de la Juventud

Tilsa Tsuchiya Castillo (September 24, 1928 – September 23, 1984) was a Peruvian printmaker and painter known for her paintings of Peruvian myths and legends. She is considered one of the greatest exemplars of Peruvian painting, having won the prestigious Bienal of Teknoquimica Prize for painting. Her teacher, Ricardo Grau, had also been presented the Bienal award in a previous year. Tsuchiya graduated from the Escuela Nacional Superior Autónoma de Bellas Artes of Peru in 1959. Tsuchiya's work addressed the contemporary issues of gender and identity and has been linked to earlier Surrealists.

== Biography ==
=== Infancy ===
Tilsa Tsuchiya was born in Supe, Peru, a city north of Lima, in 1928. She was the seventh of eight children orphaned at a young age. Her childhood nickname was "la chola." At eight years old she learned how to draw. Her father, Yoshigoro Tsuchiya (1878–1947), was born in Chiba, Japan, and arrived in Peru after studying medicine in the United States. He married Maria Luisa Castillo, who was born at Chavin, Peru and a descendant of Chinese immigrants.

=== Education ===
Tsuchiya started her studies in the Escuela Nacional Superior Autónoma de Bellas Artes of Peru in Lima in 1947. In that same year, she dealt with death of her father and, two years later, the death of her mother. The loss of her mother prompted her to stop her studies in order to start a window-making and framing shop with her brother Wilfredo.

After her return to the Escuela Nacional Superior Autónoma de Bellas Artes of Peru, she enrolled in the workshops of artists Carlos Quizpez Asin and Ricardo Grau, aside from being a student of the particular painter Manuel Zapata Orihuela. From the start, she was set apart by her unique personality and style. She graduated with the class of 1959 with honors and obtained the Gran Medalla de Oro (Great Gold Medal) in painting. In 1957, while still a student, she won the award Segundo Premio del Salón Municipal. She was also a member of the Peruvian envoy to the "Primera Bienal de la Juventud" which convened in Paris in 1958. In 1960, she traveled to France to study printmaking and engraving at the Ecole des Beaux-Arts and Art History at the Sorbonne, where she lived until the mid-1970s. Her work corresponding to this period is marked by a dark tone and minimalist aesthetic.

=== Artistic career ===
Imaginary, sexually charged compositions in a small format gained notoriety with her exposition in the Institution of Contemporary Art in 1968. In 1970, she received the Teknoquimica Award, a recognition that solidified her ascending artistic career. A painting in 1974 transformed the vertical, biomorphically carved “hitching-post” sun stone at Machu Picchu, the lost city of the Incas, into a figure rising like a Maya Chac Mool. In 1975 she returned to Peru and installed public sculpture in Portugal Street, in the district of Breña. Soon after her work took on elements of fantasy and narrative, incorporating aspects of the imagery and of the mythology of the Peruvian indigenous with European influences. Tsuchiya represented Peru at the XV Bienal de São Paulo in 1979, and her work was included in the Art of the Fantastic: Latin America 1927–1987 exhibition in Indianapolis.

=== Personal life ===
In 1948 in Huánuco, Peru, she gave birth to her first child, Orlando Cornejo Tsuchiya. In 1963 she married her husband, Charles Mercier, a Frenchman. Tsuchiya obtained French citizenship and gave birth to her second child, Gilles Mercier Tsuchiya, the same year. She died in 1984 due to cancer.

== List of works ==
=== Paintings ===
- Arlequín (1955) Propiedad del Banco del Nuevo Mundo (en liquidación)
- Bodegón (1956)
- Músicos Andinos (1968)
- Cuarteto indio (1965)
- Aro Negro (1968)
- Soledad (1968)
- Niña en la noche (1968)
- Los comensales (1968)
- Aguas superiores (1969)
- Machu Picchu (1970)
- Bodegón con pato (1971)
- Guardián del viento (1971)
- Paraiso (1971)
- Canto de guerra santa (1972)
- La gran madre (1972)
- Mito de los sueños (1974)
- Escorpión (1974)
- Mujer volando (1974)
- El mito del pájaro y las piedras (1975)
- Mito del fruto (1975)
- Mito de la laguna (1975)
- Tristán e Isolda (1974–1975)
- El mito del guerrero rojo (1976)
- Mito del árbol (1976)
- Mito de la mujer y el vuelo (1976)
- Pelícano (1978)
- Mujer y mono (1979)
- La mujer de las islas (1979)

=== Drawings ===
- Dibujo a tinta con acuarela (S/t) (1970)
- Macchu Picchu (1971)
- Dibujo a tinta con tempera (S/t) (1973)

=== Sculptures ===
- El puma de agua (1970)

=== Prints/engravings ===
- Litografía (S/t) (1976)

== Selected individual exhibitions ==
- Instituto de Arte Contemporáneo, Lima, 1959
- Galerie Cimaise, Paris, 1966
- Instituto de Arte Contemporáneo, Lima, 1968
- Instituto de Arte Contemporáneo, Lima, 1970
- Galeria Carlos Rodríquez Saavedra, Lima, 1972
- Galería Enrique Camino Brent, Lima, 1980
- Banco Popular del Peru, 1981
- Sala de Arte Petroperu, Lima, 1984

== Selected group exhibitions ==
- São Paulo Bienal, Brazil, 1979
- Art of the Fantastic, Latin America, 1920–1987, Indianapolis Museum of Art (traveled), 1987
- Latin American Women Artists, 1915–1995, Milwaukee Art Museum (traveled), 1995
