= Martín Chambi =

Peruvian photographer

Martín Chambi Jiménez
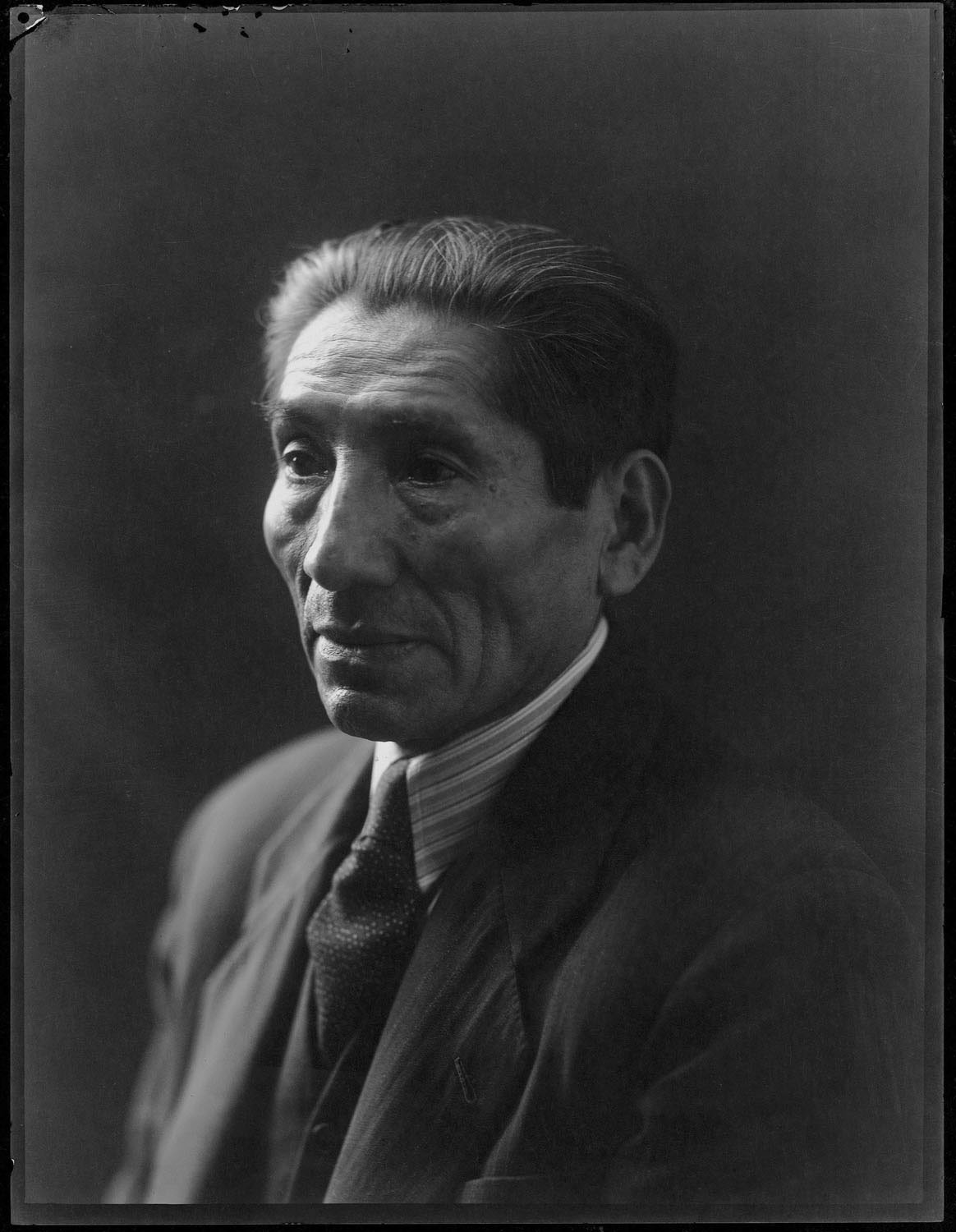
- Martín Chambi, self-portrait (c. 1920). Photo: Main cloister of the Basilica of La Merced, Cusco, 1920.
- Born: Martín Chambi Jiménez; 5 November 1891; Coaza, Puno, Peru
- Died: 13 September 1973 (aged 81); Cuzco, Peru
- Occupation: Photographer
- Years active: 1908–1958
- Known for: Portraits; documentary photography of Andean Indigenous peoples; landscape postcards; pioneering the postcard format in Peru
- Movement: Documentary photography; portraiture

Martín Chambi Jiménez (November 5, 1891 – September 13, 1973) was a Peruvian photographer, originally from Puno, in southern Peru. He was one of the first major Indigenous Latin American photographers.

Recognized for the historic and ethnic documentary value of his photographs, he was a prolific portrait photographer in the towns and countryside of the Peruvian Andes. As well as being a leading portrait photographer in Cuzco, Chambi made many landscape photographs, which he sold mainly in the form of postcards, a format he pioneered in Peru.

In 1979, New York's Museum of Modern Art held a Chambi retrospective, which later traveled to various locations and inspired other international expositions of his work.

== Beginnings as a photographer ==
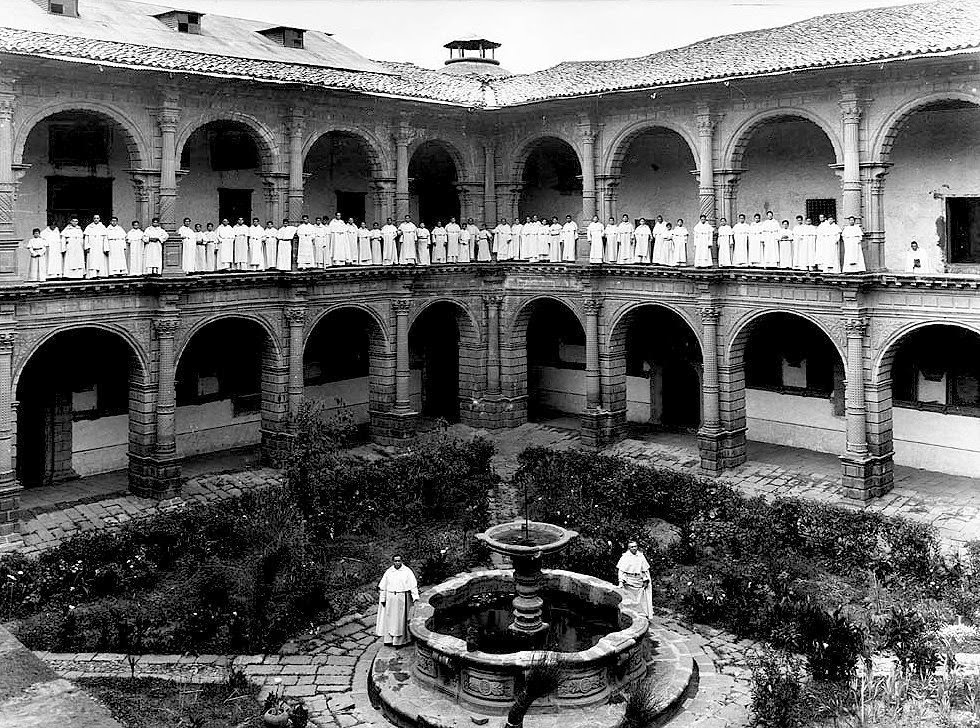
Main cloister of the Basilica of La Merced, Cusco, Peru, photograph by Martín Chambi, 1920

Martín Chambi was born into a Quechua-speaking peasant family in Puno, one of the poorest regions of Peru, on November 5, 1891. When his father went to work in a Carabaya Province gold mine on a small tributary of the Inambari River, Martin went along.

There he had his first contact with photography, learning the rudiments from the photographer of the Santo Domingo Mine near Coaza (owned by the Inca Mining Company of Bradford, Pennsylvania). This chance encounter planted the spark that made him seek to support himself as a professional photographer. With that idea in mind, he headed in 1908 to the city of Arequipa, where photography was more developed and where there were established photographers who had taken the time to develop individual photographic styles and impeccable technique.

== Photographic career ==
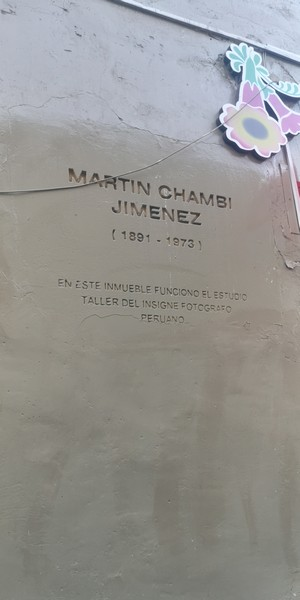
Plaque indicating the former studio home of Martin Chambi in the city of Cusco.

Chambi began his work as a photographer as an apprentice to Max T. Vargas (the father of Alberto Vargas) in Arequipa, Peru. During this time as an apprentice, Chambi learned different ways of manipulating light for portraits in the studio. His daughter, Julia Chambi, is quoted as saying, "my father was enchanted by light." His studio in Cuzco included a set of blinds and shutters made specifically so that he could alter the natural lighting to best suit his photographs. Most of Chambi's photos of Indigenous people were taken outside so that he could use only natural lighting.

After nine years set up his own studio in Sicuani in 1917, publishing his first postcards in November of that year. In 1923 he moved to Cuzco and opened a studio there, photographing both society figures and his Indigenous compatriots. During his career, Chambi also traveled the Andes extensively, photographing landscapes, Inca ruins, and local people.

Chambi traveled to Chile to exhibit some of his artworks, and used his artistic skills to allow the audience to understand how the photographer prioritized the Indigenous outcome that relates to the Peruvians and the Chileans.

Chambi produced a variety of works over his career as a photographer.In his studio, he took many portraits of wealthy and elite members of society as well as the Indigenous people. He also shot many self-portraits. Chambi is well-known for his work in documenting the Indigenous culture, including Machu Picchu and other prehispanic ruins. In a magazine interview in 1936, he is quoted saying "in my archive I have more than two hundred photographs of diverse aspects of the Quechua culture." He took pictures of ruins and architecture, but also tried to capture the events of everyday life. Addressing Chambi's diverse work, Jorge Heredia said, "He has been the photographer of whites who seek after his images, but also of Indians and Mestizos."

In addition to taking photographs for individual commissions or for his own personal interests, Chambi also used his photographs in other publications. One such publication was the use of his photographs in postcards. His photographs frequently appeared in La Nación ("The Nation"), an Argentine weekly newspaper. They published his photographs of artists, writers, and any other assignments he was commissioned to do.

== Critical response ==
"It is wrong to focus too much on the testimonial value of his photos. They have that, indeed, but, in equal measure they express the milieu in which he lived and they show (...) that when he got behind a camera, he became a giant, a true inventor, a veritable force of invention, a recreator of life."

- Mario Vargas Llosa

== Tribute ==
On November 5, 2020, Google celebrated his 129th birthday with a Google Doodle.

== Chronology ==
- 1891: Born in Coaza, Puno (Peru) to a Quechua-speaking Indigenous family.
- 1905: Father dies. Travels to the banks of the Inambari to work in the gold mines, meets photographers working at the Santo Domingo Mine owned by the Inca Mining Co.
- 1908: Apprentice in the photographic studio of Max T. Vargas, in Arequipa.
- 1917: Opens his first photographic studio in Sicuani, Cusco.
- 1920: Establishes himself in the city of Cusco, photographing in the "painterly" style he learned in Arequipa.
- 1927: Beginning of his mature photographic style
- 1936: Travel to Chile to exhibit his work, and how the Chileans and the Peruvians became different from each other.
- 1938: Opens studio gallery
- 1950: Cusco earthquake. End of the "Cusco School". After this, he gradually ceases to work actively as a photographer.
- 1958: Exposition in his honor on the occasion of 50 years of his career as a photographer.
- 1964: Chambi Exposition en Mexico ("Primera Convención de la Federación Internacional de Arte Fotográfico")
- 1973: Chambi dies in Cusco, in his old studio on Calle Marqués.
- 1976: Documentary, El arte fotográfico de Martín Chambi, by José Carlos Huayhuaca.
- 1977: First work in cataloging and restoring Chambi's photographic archives, financed by the Earthwatch Institute (Belmont, Massachusetts) marks the beginning of international recognition of his work.
- 1979: Retrospective exposition at Museum of Modern Art in New York City.
- 1981: Latin American photography exhibit in Zürich.
- 1986: BBC Arena film "Martin Chambi and The Heirs of the Incas" distributed on television worldwide.
- 1990: Exposition dedicated to Chambi at the Círculo de Bellas Artes in Madrid. Book of his work published to coincide with exhibition.
