= Cristina Gálvez =

Peruvian sculptor

Cristina Gálvez (Lima, 1916 - Lima, 1982) was a Peruvian sculptor. Along with Joaquín Roca Rey, Jorge Piqueras and Juan Guzmán she has been called one of the most important Peruvian sculptors of the twentieth century.

== Early life ==
Cristina was the daughter of Cristina Mendoza y de la Barrera de Gálvez and José Roberto Gálvez y Chipoco. Don Jose was the brother of don Luis Gálvez Chipoco, a renowned athlete and stadium name sake, her uncle Pedro Gálvez Chipoco was the owner of the Gálvez Chipoco house, a historic landmark in Barranco. Cristina's paternal grandfather was the renowned 19th century Barranquino philanthropist don Pedro Alcántara Galvéz y Martínez-Carrasco, first owner of the Galvéz y Martínez-Carrasco ranch in Plaza Espinoza de Barranco.

Relatives of Cristina Gálvez include, Michael Sayman Gálvez, Jorge del Castillo and Rossana Fernandéz-Maldonado and Catalina Recavarren.

== Career ==
Formed initially in France and Belgium, she learned from a very young age the great transformations developed in Europe prior to World War II. Her first professional studies, in the 1930s, were in workshops of renowned European artists such as Mauride in Paris and Van der Stecken in Brussels whose common denominator was based on technical demand and the promotion of creative freedom. In these workshops she will get interested in drawing, but it will be in the study of Parisian post-Cubist André Lothe - who used to infuse a certain constructive rigor in his students - where he will consolidate his trade. On her return to Peru, in 1936, she mets the group of artists known as "The independents" among whom Ricardo Grau, Macedonio de la Torre, Sérvulo Gutiérrez and Juan Ugarte Elespuru stood out, a movement that she joined after leaving the National School of Fine Arts and starting to work with the avant-garde of the moment, the Peruvian-Swiss painter Enrique Kleiser. It is between this personal rediscovery of the country, on the one hand, and a novel modernist outcrop on the other, in which her vocation for sculpture is born, an activity that will be imposed as the main in their life. The work she develops from Huanuquen leather masks - unpublished material among Peruvian scholar sculpture - allows him to access, in the early fifties, a scholarship to Europe where he undertakes his sculptural training.
