= Joaquín Roca Rey =

Peruvian sculptor

Joaquín Roca Rey (January 27, 1923, Lima – 2004) was a Peruvian sculptor. Along with Cristina Gálvez, Jorge Piqueras and Juan Guzmán he has been called one of the most important Peruvian sculptors of the twentieth century. His work shows the influence of Henry Moore.
