= Peruvian Rugby Federation =

Sports governing body in Peru

Federación Peruana de Rugby
- Sport: Rugby union
- Founded: 1997; 29 years ago
- World Rugby affiliation: 2000
- Sudamérica Rugby affiliation: 1997
- President: Daniel Cino
- Website: www.rugbyperu.org

The Peruvian Rugby Federation (Spanish: Federación Peruana de Rugby) organizes rugby union in Peru, and is a member of World Rugby and Sudamérica Rugby.

== History ==
The University of Lima, the Pontifical Catholic University of Peru, the Club de Rugby San Isidro and the Old Markhamians Rugby Club decided to create the Unión Peruana de Rugby on February 11, 1997, to organize all rugby activities and start the promotion and teaching of rugby union in Peru. The Unión Peruana de Rugby (UPR) started with Néstor Corbetto as president and Diego Zúñiga as Secretary-Treasurer who were elected amongst representatives of the four clubs: Old Markhamians Rugby Club, Universidad de Lima, Pontificia Universidad Católica and the Club de Rugby de San Isidro. Since then, two other clubs have joined the Union: the Universidad Peruana de Ciencias Aplicadas (UPC) and the Newton College Old Boys. A crest depicting a Tumi, superimposed over the Peruvian flag of 1820 is the official UPR emblem.

The government's Instituto Peruano del Deporte (Peruvian Institute for Sports) resolved in November 1997 to accept the formation of the Comisión Deportiva Nacional de Rugby — an officially recognized rugby commission — which is the first step to becoming a recognized federation.

A year after this meeting in October 1997, the Union Peruana de Rugby was formally accepted as a member of the Confederación Sudamericana de Rugby (CONSUR) at the meeting held in Mendoza, Argentina. Hereafter Peru has attended all meetings. In the January meeting in Mar del Plata the same year, Mr. Carlos Tozzi of the IRB was contacted. At this meeting, Peru's intervention allows the presence of Colombia in the meeting.

At the Montevideo meeting, as previously agreed, Peru presented Mr. Tozzi and CONSUR members a letter requesting incorporation in the IRB. The letter was faxed to the IRB on April 13, 2000. Also in 2002, the Comision Deportiva Nacional de Rugby, was recognized as Federacion Peruana de Rugby by the Instituto Peruano del Deporte.

== See also ==
- Peru national rugby union team
- Rugby union in Peru
