= Tennis in Peru =

Luis Horna and Jaime Yzaga are the most famous Peruvian tennis players. Tennis Hall of Famer and Davis Cup and Wimbledon winner Alejandro "Alex" Olmedo was born in Peru but played for the United States only for Davis Cup. Laura Arraya is the best Peruvian Tennis player in women's. Her brother is Pablo Arraya, a former Peruvian tennis player.

Although the sport is not quite as popular as others in Peru, the Peruvian tennis team generally does well and is usually at the Americas Zone Group I. Peru has reached twice the World Group playoffs in 1989, and 1994 Davis Cup, but was not able to advance into the prestigious World Group. In 2007, the Peruvian team, commanded by Luis Horna and Iván Miranda, beat the Belarus team of Max Mirnyi and Vladimir Voltchkov, and qualified to play in the 2008 World Group.

Club Lawn Tennis de la Exposición is in the district of Jesús María in Lima, it is the usual court where the Peru Davis Cup team plays. It was founded in 1884, and was the home court for the golden generation of Peruvian tennis players of the 1980s. Its principal Hermanos Buse colosseum was named after the Buse Brothers, Enrique and Eduardo Buse. Enrique played at Wimbledon and at the US Open in 1946 and again at the US Open in 1951.

== Famous Peruvian tennis players ==
- Men

Player	Year of birth	Best Singles Ranking	Best Doubles Ranking
Alex Olmedo	1936	2	-
Fernando Maynetto	1955	175	269
(Argentina) Pablo Arraya	1961	29	85
Carlos Di Laura	1964	92	29
Jaime Yzaga	1967	18	54
Alejandro Aramburú	1969	141	319
(France) Américo "Tupi" Venero	1972	297	232
Iván Miranda	1980	104	206
Luis Horna	1980	33	15
Matías Silva	1984	643	529
Mauricio Echazú	1989	379	393
Alvaro Raposo de Oliveira	1990	752	881
Sergio Galdos	1990	590	80
Duilio Beretta	1992	364	206
Jorge Brian Panta	1995	485	402
Juan Pablo Varillas	1995	60	289
Ignacio Buse	2004	31	439

- Women
  - (Argentina) Laura Arraya (Peruvian citizen)
  - Bianca Botto
  - Patricia Kú Flores

== See also ==
- Peruvian tennis players
