= Rugby union in Peru =

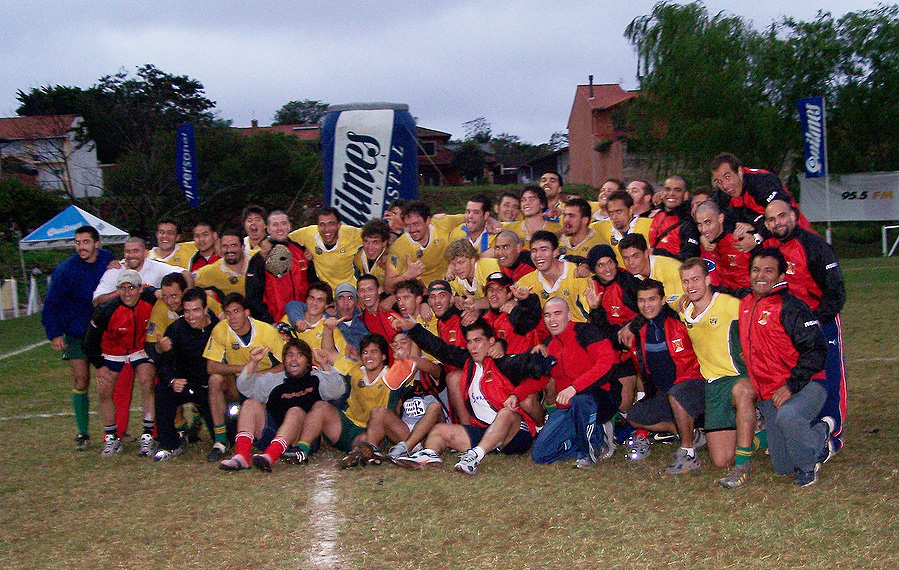
- The Brazilian and Peruvian national teams pose together
- Country: Peru
- Governing body: Unión Peruana de Rugby
- National team: Peru
- First played: 1885
- Registered players: 660
- Clubs: 6

National competitions
- Rugby World Cup; Rugby World Cup Sevens; IRB Sevens World Series; Asian Five Nations

Rugby union is a minor sport in Peru.

== Governing body ==
The national governing body is the Unión Peruana de Rugby (Peruvian Rugby Union)

== The Peruvian Union ==
On November 30, 1996, the first university test match was held between the Universidad de Lima and the Pontificia Universidad Catolica, with the former winning 18 to 3. This was the first time that everyone on the pitch, including the referee, was Peruvian.

Towards the end of 1996 and after a local tournament of seven a side, a new club was founded: the Club de Rugby San Isidro. Thus, fourteen months after having decided to train there were four clubs with their own identity, three of which had their own fields (usually an adapted football field) because the teams are affiliated with institutions. (The Club de Rugby San Isidro had to rent a field in order to train.)

The clubs decided to create the Unión Peruana de Rugby on February 11, 1997 to organize all rugby activities and start the promotion and teaching of the sport. The Unión Peruana de Rugby (UPR) started with Néstor Corbetto as President and Diego Zúñiga as Secretary-Treasurer who were elected amongst representatives of the four clubs: Old Markhamians Rugby Club, Universidad de Lima, Pontificia Universidad Católica and the Club de Rugby de San Isidro. Since then, two other clubs have joined the Union: the Universidad Peruana de Ciencias Aplicadas (UPC) and the Newton College Old Boys. A crest depicting a Tumi, superimposed over the Peruvian flag of 1820 is the official UPR emblem

The government's Instituto Peruano del Deporte (Peruvian Institute for Sports) resolved in November 1997 to accept the formation of the Commission Deportiva Nacional de Rugby — an officially recognized rugby commission — which is the first step to becoming a recognized federation.

On 2002, the Commission Deportiva Nacional de Rugby, was recognized as Federacion Peruana de Rugby, by the IPD.

== History ==
The first recorded rugby game in Peru took place in 1885 at the Lima Cricket and Football Club (LCFC). LCFC still exists, and is nicknamed the Bullfrogs, as a result of having a mixture of British and French players.

In 1958 Peru, together with Argentina, Uruguay and Chile participated in the first South American tournament, held in Santiago, Chile. Because there was no IRB-sanctioned rugby union at the time, participation was not officially accepted by Peruvian sport authorities. After this, the impulse of the game seems to have faded.

During the 1960s, 1970s and the 1980s, Peruvian rugby had only a handful of sides, with the Lima Cricket and Football Club's Bullfrogs, as the Anglo-French expat team par excellence and the South American opposite number, the Lima Polo Club, mainly consisting of Argentinian and Uruguayan residents. The Bullfrogs' main regular fixture was against the French school, and the occasional ship of the British Royal Navy. and Royal Canadian Navy. There was also a rather short-lived side known as the Tacama Pumas, organized by Peruvian and French employees working in the coastal vineyards of Tacama (three hours south of Lima) . Rugby memorabilia of this period is housed in the clubhouse of the Lima Cricket and Football Club, where photographs of the teams from Argentina, Chile, France and Ecuador who challenged the Bullfrogs during these years are kept.

Rugby was taught sporadically at Newton, Franco Peruano, and San Andres schools. However, only Newton and Markham's teams persisted in teaching rugby. Outside of Lima, there were also two sides in Iquitos.

=== 1992 - present ===
Due to the interest of some Markham graduates and Mr. David Roberts, a teacher at the school, a team was started called Old Markhamians in 1992. The side had only 15 Peruvians between the ages of 17 and 19, most of whom had never seen a rugby ball in their lives; only 7 of the 15 were really former Markham boys. This team competed with the Bullfrogs (foreigners over 30 years of age) which was the only rugby side left since the 1990s. After Mr. Roberts departure to Britain, the Old Markhamians ceased training due to a lack of facilities and instructors. In 1993 and 1994, three or four games were played for fun and "old times sake". This was the seed that those fifteen Peruvian boys germinated.

So at the end of 1995 and thanks to their interest, Bruce Allen (director of Markham's primary school) was contacted soon after his arrival in Peru to direct the Old Markhamians side. The side was reformed, with a new projection, and including new players. This was the beginning of a new era in Peru and started the take-off of rugby. On Saturday November 25, an exhibition game was held between the Old Markhamians and former players of that club who now attended the Universidad de Lima at the university football ground. By this time, there were 60 active Peruvian players. Naturally this spurred the formation of a University team, so by March 1996 Peru had two rugby teams practicing together. The Universidad de Lima side encouraged their traditional rival, the Pontificia Universidad Católica del Perú to form a team.

At the same Peruvian rugby got the happy news that in Iquitos, a city in the Peruvian Amazon which can only be reached by plane or river, a side had been formed the Alianza Rugby Club Olimpico (A.R.C.O. Iquitos), thanks to the initiative of Vincent Brack, a Frenchman. They are trying to survive since they have no one to play with and, due to distance, it is expensive to travel to Lima.

== Peruvian rugby internationally ==
Soon after the re–initiation of rugby in Peru, in 1996 contacts were made abroad and an invitation was extended to a first division club in Chile. From then on the Federacion de Rugby de Chile has been especially interested in cooperating with the growth of Peruvian rugby. On June 16, two referees from this federation gave a course updating the rules, and have sent a past-President and a trainer to overlook the growth of Peruvian rugby.

In September 1996, a local team had a chance to go abroad to face the adult and youngsters teams in Arica. The games were played on the main field of the Carlos Dittborn stadium (a 1962 World Cup hosting stadium). The following week during the South American Championship U19, the Confederacion Sudamericana (South American Federation) met in Santiago, Chile inviting Peru as an observer.

A year after this meeting in October 1997, the Unión Peruana de Rugby was formally accepted as a member of the Confederacion Sudamericana (CONSUR) at the meeting held in Mendoza, Argentina. Hereafter Peru has attended all meetings. In the January meeting in Mar del Plata the same year, Mr. Carlos Tozzi of the IRB was contacted. At this meeting, Peru's intervention allowed the presence of Colombia in the meeting.

At the Montevideo meeting, as previously agreed, Peru presented Mr. Tozzi and CONSUR members a letter requesting incorporation in the IRB. The letter was faxed to the IRB on April 13, 2000.

During this time three more teams from Chile, one from Japan and a British Royal Navy team visited Peru to play against combined or club sides. Also in 1997, two Peruvian clubs attended seven tournaments held in Arica, Chile. A Peruvian linesman attended the International Sevens Tournament in Renaca, Chile.

In September 1999 the Peruvian national side participated in its first international tournament: the first U21 South American tournament in Asuncion, Paraguay.

In November, 2000 Peru participated on the first South American group B Tournament, in São Paulo Brazil, with Brazil and Venezuela.

In 2001 they played rugby World Cup Australia 2003 Qualifying Rounds, against Brazil, Venezuela, and with Colombia, being this last, the first official IRB game to be played and won in Peruvian grounds.

== Women's rugby ==
Although Peru's women have not yet played test match rugby, they have been playing international sevens rugby since 2004. (Current playing record).
