= Jorge Piqueras =

Peruvian-born visual artist (1925-2020)

Jorge Piqueras (18 July 1925 – 2 October 2020) was a visual artist born in Peru and with Peruvian and Spanish nationality. Jorge Piqueras is recognized as one of the most important Peruvian artists of the twentieth century. Among contemporary Latin American artists, he stands out as a pioneer in geometric painting, as well as for his distinctive sculptural production. Piqueras’ work covers a wide range of materials and media, including sculpture, painting, collage, photography and assemblage.

Throughout his career, Piqueras maintained the freedom to explore and experiment with varied art forms and styles, creating a body of work in which the unexpected is emblematic. He was a close friend of Jorge Oteiza and Marcel Duchamp, whom he considered his mentors as well as models.

Piqueras lived and worked extensively in Europe, in particular Italy and France. Since 2007, he showed regularly in Lima, Peru. In May 2011, the Museum of Art of Lima organized a period retrospective of his geometric work from the 1950s.

== Early years ==
Piqueras was born in the School of Fine Arts in Lima, Peru, where his father, Manuel Piqueras-Cotolí, was resident professor of sculpture. His father, a Spanish national, was renowned as an architect, urban designer and sculptor. His mother was Zoila Sanchez-Concha Aramburú, from a traditional Lima family.

Piqueras-Cotolí's most noteworthy works in Lima include the Plaza San Martin (the Lima town square), the Olivar park (San Isidro) and the façade of the School of Fine Arts. In 1927, President Augusto B. Leguía commissioned Piqueras-Cotolí to design the Peruvian Pavilion for the 1929 Ibero-American Exposition (world's fair) in Seville. Piqueras-Cotolí travelled with his family to Seville to supervise the construction of the Pavilion, which also houses numerous sculptures by him. The family returned to Peru in 1930.

Jorge Piqueras realized his first sculptures and drawings in 1935. The death of his father in 1937, at the age of 52, was a serious blow to him. Shortly after this he met the Spanish sculptor Victorio Macho, who had come to Lima to realize a monument to Miguel Grau.

In 1944, Piqueras entered the Academia de Arte of the Universidad Católica where he studied under Adolfo Winternitz, a Viennese expatriate artist. Three years later, after winning the Baltazár Gavilán National Sculpture Prize, he met the Spanish sculptor Jorge Oteiza, who was visiting Lima, and developed a strong relationship with him.

In 1949, with a scholarship from the Instituto de Cultura Hispánica, Piqueras travelled to Europe. Initially he lived and worked with Jorge Oteiza in Bilbao, Spain. From there he travelled to Florence, Italy, where he met and married Grati Baroni, a native of Florence. He began to show his work in galleries in Italy, as well as in Paris.

== Career ==
In 1952, Piqueras began an intense period of geometric painting which was to last seven years. In 1953, he was chosen to represent Peru in the II Biennale de San Paolo, Brazil with his sculptures. Two years later he participated in the International Exposition in Valencia, Venezuela with paintings.

In 1957, Piqueras participated in the XII Salon de Réalités Nouvelles in Paris with paintings; his work was commented on by the French critic Leon Degand, in Art Aujourd’hui.

Numerous exhibitions followed in cities throughout Italy as well as other cities in Europe. During this period, the Italian critic Alberto Boato presented his work in the Galleria del Cavallino (Venice): "…Piqueras unites forcefulness and violence with a firm sense of assuredness, of dominion, of clarity and precision."

In 1959, he began a major series of paintings known as the Black Series. In 1960, he participated in the XXX Biennale Internazionale de Venezia, where his work was commented on by Alain Jouffroy: "…Piqueras and Larrain, both of them very interesting for their sense of mystery and the magical power of their forms…"

Piqueras moved to Paris in 1961. In summers in Cadaqués, Spain, he developed strong and lasting friendships with Marcel Duchamp, Man Ray, George Staempfli, Mary Callery, Barbara Curtis, Alfonso Mila, Jose Antonio Rumeu and others.

An intense period of exhibitions followed in Paris and throughout Europe, as well as in New York. The art journal mETRO published an extensive article on his work with texts by Alain Jouffroy, Paul Steinberg and Bruno Alfieri, editor of the magazine. In 1962, he was invited to participate in the exhibition "Latin American Art in Paris" in the Musee d’Art Moderne.

Henri Cartier-Bresson took a photograph of Marcel Duchamp in his studio in 1962; in the photograph, there is only one painting on the wall directly behind Duchamp – a painting by Piqueras that Duchamp had purchased. Cartier-Bresson later gave Piqueras a copy of this photograph as a gift, in thanks for a gouache Piqueras had given him.

Marcel Duchamp nominated Piqueras for the William and Noma Copley Foundation Prize (Chicago, USA) in 1964; he was chosen as the winner of the prize by a jury that included Roland Penrose, Roberto Matta, Marcel Duchamp, Herbert Read, Max Ernst, Patrick Waldberg and William Copley.

Piqueras participated in the XXXII and the XXXIII Biennale Internazionale de Venezia, in 1964 and ‘66. But I must add to that list [of the 8-9 most noteworthy artists...] Piqueras, a great painter who nonetheless is scandalously little known, to whom Peru, his home country, has given only two walls plus a fraction of another, when they should rather have presented him like Le Parc or Stenvert or Raysse, giving him the generous amplitude of an entire room, appropriately lit and arranged to favor the works so as to allow the neophyte and uninspired visitor to have a one-in-a-thousand opportunity to "see" – and I mean exactly that, to "see" – what fate has put before their eyes: these marvels of mental purity and rigor. - Alain Jouffroy

=== A decade of sculpture: Él ===
In 1968, Piqueras began to develop the emblematic figure "Él", a recurrent presence in Piqueras’ sculpture. The figure was featured in a solo exhibition of sculpture in Villeparisis, France (1973).

This personage, who struggles vainly in an absurd situation, gives an impression of solitude, a solitude that could be called cosmic, in a world that can only be described with the vocabulary of the desert – not at all a Saharan desert or a polar one, but rather a lunar desert: sidereal – a world that is totally cold and therefore, strangely indifferent. What's more, the character remains identical throughout; only the material of the columns that sustain him vary (marble, metal and wood), symbolizing a world where change is the rule. What is the meaning of this search for permanence, this resistance to change? Are we still talking about sculpture? - J. Thuller (catalog of the exhibition)

In "Volterra 73" — an exhibition organized by Enrico Crispolti in Volterra, Italy — the figure "Él" appears on traffic signals, walls and monuments throughout the city, as well as a large sculpture, "Monumento a la Libertad" (3 meters tall), installed in the main square, the Piazza dei Priori.

I participate in this manifestation with huge interest. [...] "Interventi nella citta" (Interventions in the City)... offers concrete opportunities to demolish the... loathesome [sic] barriers between the public and Art... to propose direct contact with the artist without unfortunate intermediaries. Not through the bars of cage-gallery-zoos, but in the open, surrounded by stunning landscapes, urban as well. I wish to make it clear that I detest cultural safaris. Out of bounds. Prohibitions. One-way streets. Street signs. Conditionings of all sorts… in the middle of this [my personage] trying to escape, or at least to climb something, anything, it doesn’t matter what. Art market or pure Art – it’s all the same. On the walls and astride the violence of a Stop or a One-way sign, the short-circuit happens […] I use [my personages] to measure, to try to understand what’s going on around me. - Jorge Piqueras (catalog of Volterra 73)

In 1975, "Él" took center stage once more in a solo exhibition at the Musée d’Art Moderne de la Ville de Paris. The presentation of the catalog was written by Alain Jouffroy.

Piqueras developed a friendship with Italo Calvino, who was struck by the spirit of the sculpture "Impossible N°1" and its affinity to the main character in his story "Il Conte di Montecristo".

The larger-than-life-size personage "Él", with his full identity kit, was born later - in 1982 - when the architect Sandro Masera saw the figure in Harper's Grand Bazaar and commissioned the bronze for a house he was building in Emilia-Romagna.

In 1969 Jean Dewasne invited Piqueras to participate in the Salon de Mai in Paris (1970). He took part in this Salon as well as in the Salon de la Jeune Sculpture yearly over the following years.

In Pietrasanta, in 1973, Piqueras convened – together with Alicia Penalba, Giuglio Lazotti, Gianni and Michele Benvenuti and numerous other artists – a homage to Salvador Allende, the Chilean President ousted by General Pinochet. Rafael Alberti, Henry Moore, Renato Guttuso, Alberto Moravia, Italo Calvino and many others participated by signing and leaving their handprints on posters – "Non dimentichiamo il Cile" – which were then displayed throughout the plaza. The records of this manifestation were lost in a fire.

In 1975, in "Beloeil 1, Aperçu de la sculpture en France" (Parc du Château de Beloeil, Belgium), Piqueras sculptures were shown together with works by 27 other artists, including Arp, Bury, Calder, Niki de St. Phalle, Ernst, Etienne-Martin, Honegger, Ipousteguy, Jacobsen, Magritte, Miró, Reinhoud, Schoffer, Soto and Tinguely.

=== An interlude with photography ===
Feeling the need to escape from the world of galleries and the art market, in 1978 Piqueras began to work as a photographer, together with Marina Faust, for magazines such Harper's Gran Bazaar, Interni, Ville e Giardini, Casa Vogue, Architecture d’Aujourd’hui, Cree and Corto Maltese. He proposed and realized numerous photo-reportages on subjects such as Salvador Dalí, Hans Hollein, Hunderwasser, Karl Lagerfeld, Man Ray and Etienne Martin, as well as architecture and other themes.

=== Return to painting and sculpture ===
In 1987 Piqueras initiated his return to painting and sculpture. He showed his work for the first time in his native country, Peru, as featured artist, together with Jorge Eduardo Eielson, at the III Bienal de Trujillo. There he met the writer Christine Graves and they married in 1988. Piqueras remained in Peru, initiating a new series of explorations in painting, assemblage, collage and diverse other media.

He realized a solo exhibition in the Municipalidad de Miraflores (Lima) in 1988, which included numerous paintings, assemblages and sculptures that bridged the gap between his work until 1978 and his new creations; these included the monumental sculpture "Altar a la magia". The works – based on the tree as the central symbol – used lettering, collage, dripping and other techniques to create an atmosphere of invocation and enchantment resembling a sort of rite of fertility (the trunks of the trees took the form of phalluses). Through their association in the various works of art, commonplace materials such as newspaper, tin foil, clay pots, etc. were converted into ritual elements.

In 1991, Piqueras was commissioned to realize a monumental sculpture for the Plaza de los Arqueólogos of the Museo de Sitio, Ancón, Peru – the "Monumento a la Arqueologia" in travertine.

Piqueras was invited to participate in the Première Triennale des Amériques in Maubege, France in 1993. That same year, he moved with his family to Rome, Italy, where he resided until 1998. There, Piqueras continued to review his own history, recreating works from damaged remnants or timeworn vestiges of earlier pieces, recovering materials found on the street or the beach, using detritus to produce objects and collages with tongue-in-cheek references to erudite or banal subjects. Nothing was lost or discarded. He created a series of ephemeral sculptures, for instance, using emptied eggshells and plaster bandages after his daughter, Arianna, had a cast applied to her leg. His works wavered between the autobiographical and the visionary, between denunciations and invocations, in a critical revision of his past as an artist.

In the Palazzo Ducale di Maierá (Calabria, Italy) in 1996, Piqueras conceived and organized the exhibition "Sogni pietrificati" (petrified dreams), including installations he erected with the stones recently excavated for the construction of the nearby amphitheater of M’ara. He proposed "encounters" with the sculptures of various friends, inviting Iginio Balderi, Eli Benveniste, Alfio Mongelli, Joaquin Roca Rey and Jorgen Haugen Sorensen to display their works within these installations. The exhibition also involved a new "mission" for "Él", overseeing the whole from the wall of the entrance to the palace.

In 1997, Piqueras represented Peru in the XLVII Biennale de Venezia. In Peru, he participated in the Primer Bienal Iberoamericana de Lima as a featured artist (Salón de Invitados Especiales).

In 1998, he returned to Peru with his family, where he began to take advantage of the larger spaces available to him to create larger works on canvass.

In 2003, Bruno Alfieri invited Piqueras to realize the trophy for the yearly competition "l’Automobile più bello del mondo", organized by the magazine Automobilia. He created an object with a metal base, painted Ferrari red, holding a wheel woven from bamboo reeds in the style traditionally used in Peru to make firework "castles" for major celebrations.

In 2007, as he prepared to move to Paris, Piqueras presented, in Lima, a major show of his production over the previous years. He continued to do so every two years.

In 2010, Jorge Piqueras was awarded the Orden del Sol al Mérito por Servicios Distinguidos by the Peruvian Ambassador to France in the name of the Republic of Peru.

== Personal life ==
Piqueras had four children by his first marriage to the artist Grati Baroni, whom he married in 1952: Ilaria, psychoanalyst (1947); Lorenzo, architect (1953); Gorka, architect (1956); and Francesca, photographer (1960).

With Christine Graves, whom he married in 1988, he had a daughter, Arianna Piqueras-Graves, born in 1989.

== Selected exhibitions ==
1951

- Florence, Italy, Galleria Numero (solo exhibition, sculpture)
- Paris, France, Galerie Breteau (solo exhibition, sculpture)

1953

- São Paulo, Brazil, II Biennale de São Paulo (sculpture)

1955

- Valencia, Venezuela, Exposition Internacional de la Ciudad de Valencia (painting)

1957

- Paris, France, 12éme Salon de Réalités Nouvelles (painting)
- Milan, Italy, XX Biennale Permanente (painting)

1958

- Rome, Italy, First Exhibition of Latin American artists

1959

- Milan, Italy, Galleria del Grattacielo (solo exhibition, painting)

1960

- Zurich, Switzerland, Susanne Bollag Gallery (solo exhibition, painting)
- Düsseldorf, Germany, Kunstverein Studio Für Graphiik (solo exhibition, drawings)
- Venice, Italy, XXX Esposizione Internazionale d'Arte, Biennale di Venezia (Peruvian official representation, painting)

1961

- Milan, Italy, Galleria Lorenzelli (solo exhibition, painting)

1962

- Paris, France, Galerie Flinker (group show, painting)
- Paris, France, L’Art Latino-américain a Paris, Musée d’Art Moderne de la Ville de Paris

1963

- New York, USA, Staempfli Gallery (solo exhibition, painting)
- Cadaqués, Spain, Galeria Uno (solo exhibition, painting)

1964

- Brussels, Belgium, Galerie Aujourd’hui, Palais de Beaux Arts (solo exhibition, painting)
- Venice, Italy, XXXII Esposizione Internazionale d'Arte, Biennale di Venezia (Peruvian official representation, painting)
- Paris, France, Salon de Mai (sculpture)

1966

- Paris, France, Galerie Flinker (solo exhibition, painting)
- Venice, Italy, XXXIII Esposizione Internazionale d'Arte, Biennale di Venezia (Peruvian official representation, painting)

1968

- Saint Paul-de-Vence, France, L’Art Vivant 1965-1968 (painting)

1969

- Paris, France, Salon de Mai (sculpture)
- Middelheim Antwerp, Belgium, Biennale Internationale de Sculpture

1970

- Paris, France, Salon de Mai (sculpture)
- Menton, France, VIII Biennale de Menton (sculpture)
- Paris, France, Salon de la Jeune Sculpture

1971

- Paris, France, IV Exposition Internationale de sculpture contemporaine, Musée Rodin
- Paris, Salon de Mai (sculpture)
- Paris, France, Salon de la Jeune Sculpture

1972

- Paris, France, Salon de Mai (sculpture)
- Paris, France, Salon de la Jeune Sculpture
- Carrara, Italy, Esposizione Nazionale del Marmo, Sezione Internazionale di Scultura

1973

- Villeparisis, France, Galerie du Centre Culturel Municipal (solo exhibition, sculpture)
- Volterra, Italy, Volterra 73 - Interventi nella Cittá (sculptures in public space)

1975

- Belgium, Parc du Château de Beloeil, Beloeil 1, Aperçu de la sculpture en France
- Paris, France, Musée d’Art Moderne de la Ville de Paris, ARC 2 (solo exhibition, sculpture)

1976

- Ville Nouvel d’Évry, Agora Place des Terrasses, 11 Sculptures

1977

- Paris, France, FIAC - stand Galerie Attali (sculptures and preliminary studies)

1982

- Berlin, Germany, Künstler aus Lateinamerika, Berliner Künstlerprogramme (group show, sculpture)

1987

- Trujillo, Peru, III Bienal de Trujillo (Guest of Honour)

1988

- Lima, Peru, Sala de la Municipalidad de Miraflores (solo exhibition, painting and sculpture)

1990

- Lima, Peru, Galería Camino Brent (solo exhibition, painting)

1992

- Los Angeles, California, Iturralde Gallery (solo exhibition, painting)

1993

- Maubeuge, France, I Triennale des Amériques 1993 (painting)

1996

- México D.F., Museo José Luis Cuevas, Homenaje a Juan W. Acha (itinerant group show, painting)
- Maierà, Calabria, Italy, Palazzo Ducale, Sogni Pietrificati (curator, group show, sculpture and installation)

1997

- Venice, XLVII Esposizione Internazionale d'Arte, Biennale di Venezia (Peruvian official representation, painting)
- Lima, Peru, I Bienal Iberoamericana de Lima, Salón de Invitados Especiales (painting)

1999

- Lima, Peru, Museo de Arte de Lima, Partidas, Retornos y Exilios Interiores en las décadas de los ‘80 y ‘90 (painting and sculpture)

2005

- Lima, Peru, Galería Lucía de la Puente, 10th anniversary (group show, sculpture)

2007

- Lima, Peru, Galería Lucía de la Puente (solo exhibition, painting)

2011

- Lima, Peru, Museo de Arte de Lima (MALI), Jorge Piqueras: De la estructura al estallido – Una geometría en proceso, 1952-1959, (monographic solo exhibition, geometric painting)

2013

- Copenhagen, Denmark, Gallery Claus Christensen, Jorge Piqueras and Jorgen Haugen Sorensen, Two One-of-a-Kind (two-man show, painting and sculpture)

2014

- Lima, Peru, Museo de la Nacion, 1st ComparArt (biennial art show; painting, sculpture, photography, video art, street art)

2015

- Lima, Peru, Museo de Arte de Lima, The Other Edge: Geometric Painting in Peru 1947–1958 (group show, painting)

2016

- Lima, Peru, Galería Lucía a de la Puente (solo exhibition, painting)

2021

- Saint-Junien, Francia, Halle aux grains, Jorge Piqueras 2016-2020 (solo exhibition, painting and sculpture)

2023

- Madrid, Spain, Fundación Juan March, Antes de América: Fuentes originarias en la cultura moderna (exhibition that explores the roots of ancient and indigenous cultures in the contemporary creation of the Americas)

== Selected bibliography ==
=== Books ===
- Art Actuel, SKIRA Annuel, No 2, (1976). Editions d’Art Albert Skira, Geneva, p 94.
- Museo de Arte de San Marcos, (2014). Colección de Arte Contemporáneo, Tomo II, Editorial Súper Gráfica EIRL, Lima, p 126.
- Crispolti, Enrico (1968). Ricerca dopo l’ informale, Oficina Edizioni, Rome, pp 136, 162, 260, 287, 288, 71.
- Crispolti, Enrico (1977). "Da Volterra 73 alla Biennale 1976", in Arte visive e partecipazione sociale, De Donato, Bari.
- Crispolti, Enrico (1973). Volterra ’73: Sculture, ambientazioni, visualizzazioni, porgettazioni per l’alabastro, Comune di Volterra.
- Enciclopedia Italiana di Scienze, Lettere, ed Arti (1979). Instituto de la Enciclopedia Italiana, Rome.
- Enciclopedia Universale SEDA dell’Arte Moderna (n.d.), Vol 6. IDAF (Instituto para la Difusión del Arte Figurativo), Milan.
- Gough-Cooper, Jennifer and Caumont, Jacques (1993). Marcel Duchamp, Gruppo Editoriale Fabbri Bompiani, Milan.
- Jouffroy, Alain (1964). Une revolution du regard, Editorial Gallimard, París.
- Jouffroy, Alain (1966). "The Paris International Avant-Garde", in New Art Around the World, Harry N. Abrams Inc. Publishers, New York, pp 82, 92, 247, 26.
- Lerner, Sharon (ed.) (2013). Arte Contemporaneo, Museo de Arte de Lima, Lima.
- MALI, Jorge Piqueras: Dibujos, Cuadernos – 1952-1959 (2012). Museo de Arte de Lima, Lima.
- Metro International Directory of Contemporary Art (1964). Editoriale Metro, Milan, pp 292–293.
- Museo de Arte de San Marcos, (2014). Colección de Arte Contemporáneo, Tomo II, Editorial Súper Gráfica EIRL, Lima, p 126.
- Pelay Orozco, Miguel (1978). Oteiza: Su Vida, su Obra, su Pensamiento, su Palabra, Editorial La Gran Enciclopedia Vasca, Bilbao, p 354.
- Sabino, Catherine and Tondini, Angelo (1985). "Cremonesi, A revival of 1930s rationalism", in Italian Style, Clarkson N. Potter Inc. Publishers, New York.
- Trivelli, Carlo (2003). "Aproximaciones a la escultura de Jorge Piqueras", in Homenaje a Ana Magcano: I Simposio sobre Escultura Peruana del Siglo XX, Lima: Pontificia Universidad Católica del Perú.

=== Magazines ===
- Alfieri, Bruno (1961). "Jorge Piqueras", Metro, No 2: 62–67.
- Art International (January 1967). Nº 11: 75.
- Artspace (January–April 1992). Nº 1-2: 26.
- "Caminos De Piqueras" (26 de agosto de 1990). Sí, Nº 184: 71-72.
- De Grada, Rafaelle (September–November 1966). "La via chiusa della XXXIII Biennale", Arte club, Nº 30: 10-21.
- De Szyszlo, Fernando (9 November 1992). "1942-1992 y la palabra que la designa", Oiga p 96-100, 103.
- Degand, Leon (June 1957). "Le XII Salon des Realités Nouvelles", Art d’aujour d’hui, Nº 13: 25.
- Del Valle, Augusto (2012). "La invención de una tradición", Hueso Húmero, Nº 60, Mosca Azul, Lima, Peru.
- Domus, (September 1959), Nº 358: 17.
- Gatellier, Gilber (August–November 1966). "Trois expositions en coup de poing", Arts Loisirs, Nº 59: 55.
- Il Collesionista d’Arte Moderna (July 1962). Bolaffi Editore, p 161.
- Jouffroy, Alain (1966). "Jorge Piqueras", Syn, Nº 1.
- Jouffroy, Alain (July–August 1966). "Le grand jeu de la Biennale", L’Oeil, Nº 139-140: 44-51, 61.
- Jouffroy, Alain (June 1962). "Les ‘nouveantés parisiennes’ et le futur". Domus, Nº 391: 31-32.
- Jouffroy, Alain (1961). "La volenté d’ordre et la volenté de désordre se combattent avec acharnement dans l’ouevre de Piqueras", Metro, Nº 2: 68-69.
- Lama, Luis (12 December 1988). "Poesía amor mío", Caretas, Nº 1036: 68-69.
- Le Grandi Automobili (The Great Cars) (Winter 2003). Automobilia, Milan.
- "L’impossibile: Improbabili storie di libertà" (March–April 1979). Harper’s Gran Bazaar, Nº 1 (see also cover).
- Piqueras, Jorge (May–June 1982). "Il Castello dello Stupore, un’Architettura di Jorge Piqueras", Harper’s Gran Bazaar Nº 5–6: 118-121.
- Schonenberger, Gualtiero (May 1961). "Jorge Piqueras", Art International, Vol XI/1: 75-76.
- Steimberg, Paul (1961). "Une lettre sur Piqueras", Metro, Nº 2: 102.
- "The noble experiment at Cadaques" (9 September 1963). Life International, Vol 35, Nº 5: 62-67.
- Umbro, Apolonio. Quadrum, Nº 8: 183.
- Umbro, Apolonio. Quadrum, Nº10: 160–161.
- "Una famiglia esplosiva" (23 April 1959). Vita, p 51.
- Villacorta, Jorge (17 September 1990). "Jorge Piqueras: La soledad del que mira", Oiga, Nº 500: 54-56.
- Villacorta, Jorge (22 September 1990). "El sueño de Piqueras". Página Libre, cultural magazine, p 4

=== Newspaper articles ===
- "Arte peruano en Europa" (9 September 1951), El Comercio, Sunday magazine, Lima, p 13.
- Balta, Aída (18 December 1988)."Provocaciones intelectuales", El Comercio, Lima.
- Bartra, Jacques (13 December 1988). "La magia de Piqueras", Expreso, Lima.
- Bartra, Jacques (4 September 1990). "Recordarse a uno mismo", Expreso, Lima p 14.
- Bosquet, Alain, (7 November 1966). "Jorge Piqueras", Combat (Paris), p 9.
- Coya, Hugo (10 January 1988). "El feliz retorno", Lundero, La Industria, Trujillo, p 8.
- De la Jara, César (30 November 1950). "Tres nombres", Numero, Florence, p 4.
- "Due scultori peruviani" (10 May 1951). L"Unita, Rome, p 3.
- Flores, Pilar (29 March 1992). "En Ancón: Un monument al pasado y al future de la arqueología", Cronicas, El Comercio, Lima.
- "Jorge Piqueras e Roca Rey al Bar Cennini" (12 February 1952). Il nuovo corriere, Florence.
- "Jorge Piqueras Sánchez-Concha obtuvo el premio Baltazar Gávilan" (29 April 1948). El Comercio, Lima, p 8.
- Jouffroy, Alain (22 October 1964). "L’oeuvre de Piqueras", Beaux Arts (Bruselas), No 1064, p 13.
- Jouffroy, Alain (3 September 1961). "La voluntad de orden y la voluntad de desorden combaten encarnizadamente en la obra de Piqueras", El Comercio, Lima, Sunday magazine, p 4.
- Jouffroy, Alain (June 1960). "Proclame que l’art moderne est l’oeuvre de jeunes gens révoltés", Arts (Paris), No 780, p 16.
- Lama, Luis (30 August 1987). "Reencuentro plástico con el Perú", Lundero, La Industria, Trujillo, p 6-7.
- Lores, Eduardo (24 June 2000). "Hombre de contrastes", El Comercio, Lima, p C8.
- "Los escultores peruanos Roca Rey y Piqueras exhiben con éxito en París", (9 June 1951). El Comercio, Lima.
- Mallonee, Laura C. (26 May 2015). "The Geometric Origins of Modern Painting in Peru", Hyperallergic, (http://hyperallergic.com). "Mostre romane" (10 May 1951). L’Unite, Roma.
- MP (18 December 1988). "… y de París a su país", Lundero, La Industria (Trujillo).
- Niño de Guzmán, Guillermo (4 December 1988). "El retorno de Jorge Piqueras", Primera Semana, Lima, pp 4–5.
- Niño de Guzmán, Guillermo (4 December 1988)."Piqueras: Goce del instante", El Comercio, Lima, p C1.
- "Piqueras e Roca Rey" (12 February 1952). La Nazione Italiana, Florencia.
- "Piqueras y Él" (22 November 1987). Lundero, La Indústria, Chiclayo-Trujillo.
- R. V. "Piqueras et Roca Rey" (June 1951). Arts, París.
- Rodriguez Saavedra, Carlos (1965). "De pintura", El Comercio, Lima.
- Schonenberger, Gualtiero. "Jorge Piqueras" (4 de mayo de 1959). La Gazzetta Ticinese, Lugano.
- Solari Swayne, Manuel (1963). "Un artista peruano que triunfa: Jorge Piqueras", El Comercio, Lima.
- Solari Swayne, Manuel. "Jorge Piqueras Sánchez-Concha" (8 May 1947). El Comercio, Lima, p 8.
- Trucchi, Lorenza (16 May 1951. "Due scultori peruviani", Il Momento, Rome, p 3.
- Ugaz, Martín (18 March 2002). "Jorge Piqueras: Breve acercamiento", Identidades, El Peruano, Lima.
- Valsecchi, Marco (8 April 1961). "Piqueras", Il Giorno, Milan.
- VQ (3 May 1951). "In via Romagna polvere degli Incas", Il Momento, Rome, p 3.

=== Catalogs ===
- Alfieri, Bruno (1960). "Piqueras", XXX Bienal Internacional de Venecia.
- Alfieri, Bruno; Boatto, Alberto; Valeschi, Marco; Degand, Leon (1959). "Jorge Piqueras", Galería Il Fondaco, Messina.
- "Beloeil, Apercu dela Sculpture en France" (June 1975). Parc du Chateau de Beloeil, Bélgica.
- "IV Exposition Internationale de Sculpture Contemporaine" (1971). Musée Rodin, París.
- Degand, Léon. "Jorge Piqueras" (October 1957). Galleria del Fiore, Milan.
- Graves, Christine (editor). "Jorge Piqueras" (July 2021). Ville de Saint-Junien.
- Graves, Christine (2000). Primera Bienal Iberoamericana, Lima.
- Graves, Christine (1996). "Jorge Piqueras", in Pintura peruana de la década de los 90, homenaje a Juan Hacha, Museo José Luis Cuevas, Mexico City.
- Graves, Christine (June 1997). "Jorge Piqueras", XLVII Bienal de Venezia, Instituto Italo–Latinoamericano, Rome.
- Graves, Christine (August 1990). "Reflexiones sobre el aprender a mirar", Galería Camino Brent, Lima.
- Gutiérrez Viñuales, Rodrigo et al. (editors). "Antes de América: Fuentes originarias en la cultura moderna", Fundación Juan March, Madrid.
- Jouffroy, Alain (March 1975). "Piqueras ou l’occupation d’un musée par un prissionier évadé", Musée d’Art Moderne de la Ville de Paris, París.
- Jouffroy, Alain (October 1963). "Jorge Piqueras", Galería Staempfli, Nueva York.
- "Kunstler aus Lateinamerika" (June 1982). DAAD Galerie, Berlín. Municipalidad Metropolitana de Lima (Septiembre 1997). I Bienal de Lima, Tele 2000, Lima, p 121.
- "L’art et la route" (July 1977). 3er Salon d’Art Contemporain de Saint Junien, París.
- Pierluca (1957). "Jorge Piqueras", Galleria Numero, Florence.
- "Perú" (1964). Group show of the Peruvian representation in the XXXII Bienal Internacional de Venecia, Lima.
- "Ia Rassegna Internazionale di Scultura Contemporanea" (September 1973). Casina Rossa, Lucca.
- "Tableaux Modernes et Contemporains" (November 1986). Nouveau Drouot, París.
- "2da Bienal de Arte Contemporáneo de Trujillo" (November 1985). Casa Ganoza, Banco Industrial, Trujillo.
- Thuller, J (March 1973). "Piqueras", Centre Cultural Municipal de Villeparisis, Villeparisis.
- Venturi, Leonelo (Abril 1951). "Roca e Jorge Piqueras", Galleria Lo Zodiaco, Rome.
- Villacorta, Jorge (January 2000). "Rumbos de la plástica peruana", Club Regatas de Lima, Lima.
